= 1896 Louisville Colonels season =

1896 Louisville Colonels
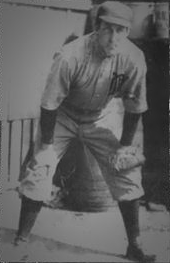
- Tom McCreery, outfielder for the Louisville Colonels in 1896
- League: National League
- Ballpark: Eclipse Park II
- City: Louisville, Kentucky
- Record: 38–93 (.290)
- League place: 12th
- Owners: Barney Dreyfuss
- Managers: John McCloskey, Bill McGunnigle

The 1896 Louisville Colonels baseball team finished with a 38–93 record and last place in the National League for the third straight season. The team lost 5 games over the course of two days – a tripleheader on September 7, and a doubleheader on September 8.

== Regular season ==
=== Season standings ===
National League
Team	W	L	Pct.	GB	Home	Road
Baltimore Orioles	90	39	.698	—	49‍–‍16	41‍–‍23
Cleveland Spiders	80	48	.625	9½	43‍–‍19	37‍–‍29
Cincinnati Reds	77	50	.606	12	51‍–‍15	26‍–‍35
Boston Beaneaters	74	57	.565	17	42‍–‍24	32‍–‍33
Chicago Colts	71	57	.555	18½	42‍–‍24	29‍–‍33
Pittsburgh Pirates	66	63	.512	24	35‍–‍31	31‍–‍32
New York Giants	64	67	.489	27	39‍–‍26	25‍–‍41
Philadelphia Phillies	62	68	.477	28½	42‍–‍27	20‍–‍41
Washington Senators	58	73	.443	33	38‍–‍29	20‍–‍44
Brooklyn Bridegrooms	58	73	.443	33	35‍–‍28	23‍–‍45
St. Louis Browns	40	90	.308	50½	27‍–‍34	13‍–‍56
Louisville Colonels	38	93	.290	53	25‍–‍37	13‍–‍56

=== Record vs. opponents ===
1896 National League record Sources:
Team	BAL	BSN	BRO	CHI	CIN	CLE	LOU	NYG	PHI	PIT	STL	WAS
Baltimore	—	5–7	6–6	7–4–2	10–2	3–8–1	10–2	9–3	12–0	9–2	9–3	10–2
Boston	7–5	—	10–2	3–9	5–6	5–7–1	8–4	7–5	7–5	7–5	8–4	7–5
Brooklyn	6–6	2–10	—	6–6	2–10	5–7	8–4	4–8	8–4	6–5–1	7–5	4–8–1
Chicago	4–7–2	9–3	6–6	—	4–6–1	2–9–1	9–3	5–7	4–8	11–1	9–3	8–4
Cincinnati	2–10	6–5	10–2	6–4–1	—	6–5	9–3	6–6	8–4	5–7	12–0	7–4
Cleveland	8–3–1	7–5–1	5–7	9–2–1	5–6	—	8–3–2	7–5	6–6	4–8–1	10–2	9–3–1
Louisville	2–10	4–8	4–8	3–9	3–9	3–8–2	—	4–8–1	7–5	2–10	3–9	3–9
New York	3–9	5–7	8–4	7–5	6–6	5–7	8–4–1	—	3–8	4–8	9–3–1	6–6
Philadelphia	0–12	5–7	4–8	8–4	4–8	6–6	5–7	8–3	—	6–6	8–3	8–4
Pittsburgh	2–9	5–7	5–6–1	1–11	7–5	8–4–1	10–2	8–4	6–6	—	8–3	6–6
St. Louis	3–9	4–8	5–7	3–9	0–12	2–10	9–3	3–9–1	3–8	3–8	—	5–7
Washington	2–10	5–7	8–4–1	4–8	4–7	3–9–1	9–3	6–6	4–8	6–6	5–7	—

=== Roster ===
1896 Louisville Colonels
Roster
Pitchers: Fritz Clausen; Bert Cunningham; Charlie Emig; Chick Fraser; Art Herman; Bill Hill; Joe Kostal; Mike McDermott; Tom Smith; Gus Weyhing	Catchers: Eddie Boyle; Charlie Dexter; Frank Freund; Tom Kinslow; Doggie Miller; Jack Warner; Infielders: Pete Cassidy; Billy Clingman; Jack Crooks; Joe Dolan; Frank Eustace; Bill Hassamaer; Abbie Johnson; Tom Morrison; John O'Brien; Jim Rogers; Frank Shannon; Sammy Strang	Outfielders: Fred Clarke; Ducky Holmes; Tom McCreery; Herm McFarland; Ollie Pickering; George Treadway; Joe Wright	Manager: John McCloskey; Bill McGunnigle

== Player stats ==
=== Batting ===
==== Starters by position ====
Note: Pos = Position; G = Games played; AB = At bats; H = Hits; Avg. = Batting average; HR = Home runs; RBI = Runs batted in

Pos	Player	G	AB	H	Avg.	HR	RBI
C	Charlie Dexter	107	402	112	.279	3	37
1B	Jim Rogers	72	290	75	.259	0	38
2B	John O'Brien	49	186	63	.339	2	24
SS	Joe Dolan	44	165	35	.212	3	18
3B	Billy Clingman	121	423	99	.234	2	37
OF	Tom McCreery	115	441	155	.351	7	65
OF	Fred Clarke	131	517	168	.325	9	79
OF	Ollie Pickering	45	165	50	.303	1	22

==== Other batters ====
Note: G = Games played; AB = At bats; H = Hits; Avg. = Batting average; HR = Home runs; RBI = Runs batted in

Player	G	AB	H	Avg.	HR	RBI
Doggie Miller	98	324	89	.275	1	33
Pete Cassidy	49	184	39	.212	0	12
Ducky Holmes	47	141	38	.270	0	18
Jack Crooks	39	122	29	.238	2	15
Frank Shannon	31	115	18	.157	1	15
Jack Warner	33	110	25	.227	0	10
Herm McFarland	30	110	21	.191	1	12
Bill Hassamaer	30	106	26	.245	2	14
Frank Eustace	25	100	17	.170	1	11
Abbie Johnson	25	87	20	.230	0	14
Sammy Strang	14	46	12	.261	0	7
Tom Morrison	8	27	4	.148	0	0
Tom Kinslow	8	25	7	.280	0	7
Eddie Boyle	3	9	0	.000	0	0
George Treadway	2	7	1	.143	0	1
Joe Wright	2	7	2	.286	0	0
Frank Freund	2	5	1	.200	0	0

=== Pitching ===
==== Starting pitchers ====
Note: G = Games pitched; IP = Innings pitched; W = Wins; L = Losses; ERA = Earned run average; SO = Strikeouts

Player	G	IP	W	L	ERA	SO
Chick Fraser	43	349.1	12	27	4.87	91
Bill Hill	43	319.2	9	28	4.31	104
Bert Cunningham	27	189.1	7	14	5.09	37
Art Herman	14	94.1	4	6	5.63	13
Mike McDermott	12	65.0	2	7	7.34	12
Gus Weyhing	5	42.0	2	3	6.64	9
Fritz Clausen	2	11.0	0	2	6.55	4
Charlie Emig	1	8.0	0	1	7.88	1
Tom McCreery	1	1.0	0	1	36.00	0

==== Other pitchers ====
Note: G = Games pitched; IP = Innings pitched; W = Wins; L = Losses; ERA = Earned run average; SO = Strikeouts

Player	G	IP	W	L	ERA	SO
Tom Smith	11	55.0	2	3	5.40	14
Ducky Holmes	2	12.0	0	1	7.50	3

==== Relief pitchers ====
Note: G = Games pitched; W = Wins; L = Losses; SV = Saves; ERA = Earned run average; SO = Strikeouts

Player	G	W	L	SV	ERA	SO
Joe Kostal	2	0	0	0	0.00	0
