= 1896 Philadelphia Phillies season =

National League season

1896 Philadelphia Phillies
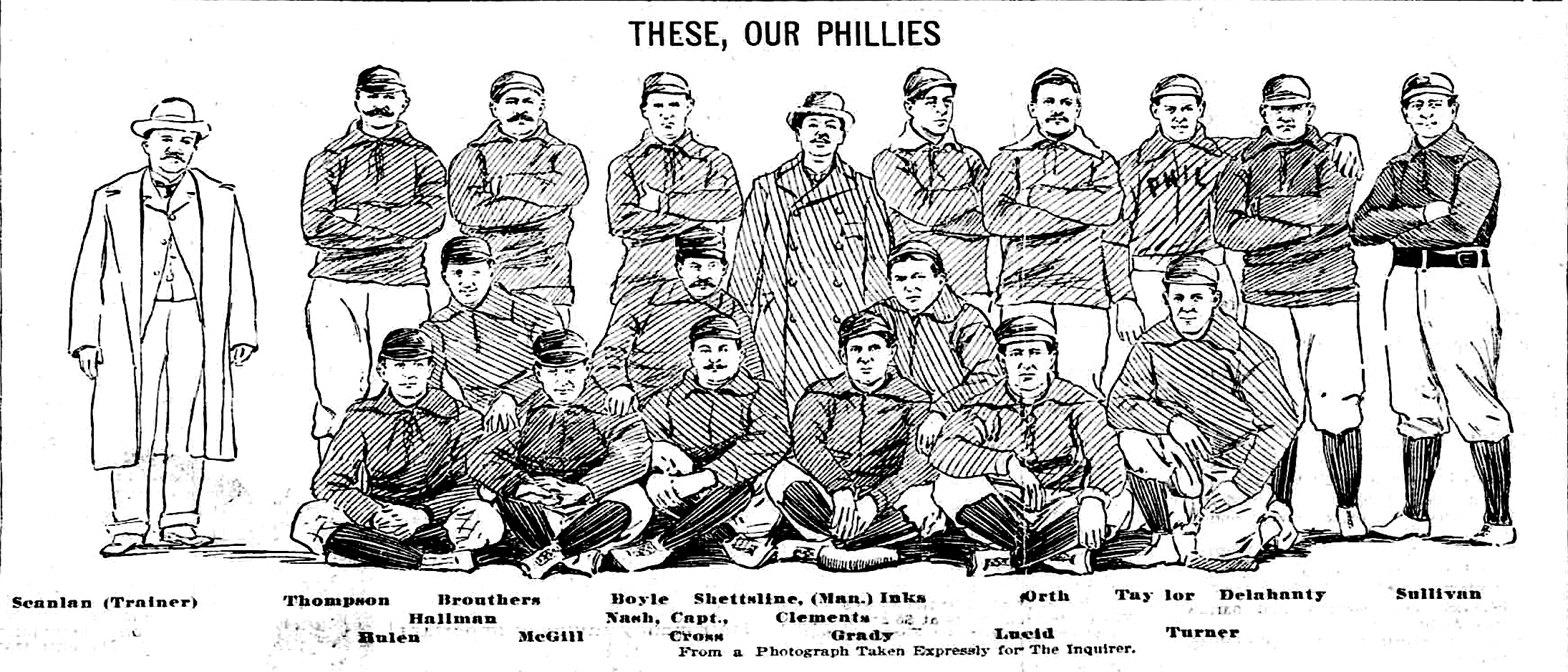
- League: National League
- Ballpark: National League Park
- City: Philadelphia, Pennsylvania
- Record: 62–68 (.477)
- League place: 8th
- Owners: Al Reach, John Rogers
- Managers: Billy Nash

The 1896 Philadelphia Phillies did well at home, but had difficulty on the road during a season which kicked off with a pre-season tribute to former Phillies manager Harry Wright, who had died during the fall of 1895.

== Preseason ==
Baseball pioneer and former Phillies manager Harry Wright had died in October 1895. The National League declared April 13, 1896 to be "Wright Day," and the Phillies, along with the other clubs playing that day, dedicated their gate receipts to a memorial in Wright's memory. Wright's arrival as Phillies manager in 1884 brought immediate credibility to the fledging organization, and he exerted a positive influence on the growth of baseball in the area.

The Philadelphia Inquirer wrote, "Harry Wright came to this city in the zenith of his powers as a base ball manager, and what he did for the development of the local end of the national game of base ball is a matter of history. It was here that he passed the evening of his life, beloved by all whose good fortune it was to know him. Here it was that he had his little home staked, and here in the impressive silence of beautiful West Laurel Hill his mortal remains lie buried. His work was an honor to Philadelphians, who will doubtless turn and give substantial evidence of their appreciation of that honor."

The Inquirer rallied the city's amateur baseball organizations to attend the game in numbers. Four thousand fans attended the Phillies exhibition game at Philadelphia Ball Park against the Atlantic League Philadelphia Athletics, raising $1,400 for the Wright memorial.

== Regular season ==
On July 13, 1896, Phillies outfielder and firstbaseman Ed Delahanty hit four home runs at Chicago's West Side Park, only the second player to do so. In contrast to Bobby Lowe's feat two years earlier, which was aided by a short foul line, two of Delahanty's were inside-the-park. After Delahanty's third, center fielder Bill Lange drew a laugh by calling "time", stationing himself in deep-deep center, near the clubhouse, seemingly a mile away, and then waving the pitcher to continue. Delahanty then got the laugh on Lange by knocking it between the clubhouse and the fence, again circling the bases while Lange scurried for the ball. The normally partisan home fans cheered Delahanty's effort. Chicago would win the game, 9–8.

=== Season standings ===
National League
Team	W	L	Pct.	GB	Home	Road
Baltimore Orioles	90	39	.698	—	49‍–‍16	41‍–‍23
Cleveland Spiders	80	48	.625	9½	43‍–‍19	37‍–‍29
Cincinnati Reds	77	50	.606	12	51‍–‍15	26‍–‍35
Boston Beaneaters	74	57	.565	17	42‍–‍24	32‍–‍33
Chicago Colts	71	57	.555	18½	42‍–‍24	29‍–‍33
Pittsburgh Pirates	66	63	.512	24	35‍–‍31	31‍–‍32
New York Giants	64	67	.489	27	39‍–‍26	25‍–‍41
Philadelphia Phillies	62	68	.477	28½	42‍–‍27	20‍–‍41
Washington Senators	58	73	.443	33	38‍–‍29	20‍–‍44
Brooklyn Bridegrooms	58	73	.443	33	35‍–‍28	23‍–‍45
St. Louis Browns	40	90	.308	50½	27‍–‍34	13‍–‍56
Louisville Colonels	38	93	.290	53	25‍–‍37	13‍–‍56

=== Record vs. opponents ===
1896 National League record Sources:
Team	BAL	BSN	BRO	CHI	CIN	CLE	LOU	NYG	PHI	PIT	STL	WAS
Baltimore	—	5–7	6–6	7–4–2	10–2	3–8–1	10–2	9–3	12–0	9–2	9–3	10–2
Boston	7–5	—	10–2	3–9	5–6	5–7–1	8–4	7–5	7–5	7–5	8–4	7–5
Brooklyn	6–6	2–10	—	6–6	2–10	5–7	8–4	4–8	8–4	6–5–1	7–5	4–8–1
Chicago	4–7–2	9–3	6–6	—	4–6–1	2–9–1	9–3	5–7	4–8	11–1	9–3	8–4
Cincinnati	2–10	6–5	10–2	6–4–1	—	6–5	9–3	6–6	8–4	5–7	12–0	7–4
Cleveland	8–3–1	7–5–1	5–7	9–2–1	5–6	—	8–3–2	7–5	6–6	4–8–1	10–2	9–3–1
Louisville	2–10	4–8	4–8	3–9	3–9	3–8–2	—	4–8–1	7–5	2–10	3–9	3–9
New York	3–9	5–7	8–4	7–5	6–6	5–7	8–4–1	—	3–8	4–8	9–3–1	6–6
Philadelphia	0–12	5–7	4–8	8–4	4–8	6–6	5–7	8–3	—	6–6	8–3	8–4
Pittsburgh	2–9	5–7	5–6–1	1–11	7–5	8–4–1	10–2	8–4	6–6	—	8–3	6–6
St. Louis	3–9	4–8	5–7	3–9	0–12	2–10	9–3	3–9–1	3–8	3–8	—	5–7
Washington	2–10	5–7	8–4–1	4–8	4–7	3–9–1	9–3	6–6	4–8	6–6	5–7	—

=== Roster ===
1896 Philadelphia Phillies
Roster
Pitchers: Kid Carsey; Ned Garvin; Ad Gumbert; Bert Inks; Charlie Jordan; Harry Keener; Con Lucid; Willie McGill; Jerry Nops; Al Orth; Jack Taylor; George Wheeler; Bill Whitrock	Catchers: Jack Boyle; Jack Clements; Mike Grady; Infielders: Dan Brouthers; Lave Cross; Ben Ellis; William Gallagher; Bill Hallman; Billy Hulen; Nap Lajoie; Dan Leahy; Billy Nash	Outfielders: Duff Cooley; Ed Delahanty; Phil Geier; Sam Mertes; Joe Sullivan; Sam Thompson; Tuck Turner	Manager: Billy Nash

== Player stats ==
=== Batting ===
==== Starters by position ====
Note: Pos = Position; G = Games played; AB = At bats; H = Hits; Avg. = Batting average; HR = Home runs; RBI = Runs batted in

Pos	Player	G	AB	H	Avg.	HR	RBI
C	Mike Grady	71	242	77	.318	1	44
1B	Dan Brouthers	57	218	75	.344	1	41
2B	Bill Hallman	120	469	150	.320	2	83
3B	Billy Nash	65	227	56	.247	3	30
SS	Billy Hulen	88	339	90	.265	0	38
OF	Sam Thompson	119	517	154	.298	12	100
OF	Ed Delahanty	123	499	198	.397	13	126
OF	Duff Cooley	64	287	88	.307	2	22

==== Other batters ====
Note: G = Games played; AB = At bats; H = Hits; Avg. = Batting average; HR = Home runs; RBI = Runs batted in

Player	G	AB	H	Avg.	HR	RBI
Lave Cross	106	406	104	.256	1	73
Joe Sullivan	48	191	48	.251	2	24
Jack Clements	57	184	66	.359	5	45
Nap Lajoie	39	175	57	.326	4	42
Jack Boyle	40	145	43	.297	1	28
Sam Mertes	37	143	34	.238	0	14
Phil Geier	17	56	13	.232	0	6
William Gallagher	14	49	15	.306	0	6
Tuck Turner	13	32	7	.219	0	0
Ben Ellis	4	16	1	.063	0	0
Dan Leahy	2	6	2	.333	0	1

=== Pitching ===
==== Starting pitchers ====
Note: G = Games pitched; IP = Innings pitched; W = Wins; L = Losses; ERA = Earned run average; SO = Strikeouts

Player	G	IP	W	L	ERA	SO
Jack Taylor	45	359.0	20	21	4.79	97
Al Orth	25	196.0	15	10	4.41	23
Kid Carsey	27	187.1	11	11	5.62	36
Harry Keener	16	113.1	3	11	5.88	28
Willie McGill	12	79.2	5	4	5.31	29
Ad Gumbert	11	77.1	5	3	4.54	14
Con Lucid	5	42.0	1	4	8.36	3
Jerry Nops	1	7.0	1	0	5.14	1

==== Other pitchers ====
Note: G = Games pitched; IP = Innings pitched; W = Wins; L = Losses; ERA = Earned run average; SO = Strikeouts

Player	G	IP	W	L	ERA	SO
George Wheeler	3	16.1	1	1	3.86	2
Ned Garvin	2	13.0	0	1	7.62	4
Bert Inks	3	10.1	0	1	7.84	2
Bill Whitrock	2	9.0	0	1	3.00	1

==== Relief pitchers ====
Note: G = Games pitched; W = Wins; L = Losses; SV = Saves; ERA = Earned run average; SO = Strikeouts

Player	G	W	L	SV	ERA	SO
Charlie Jordan	2	0	0	0	7.71	3
Bill Hallman	1	0	0	0	18.00	0
