= 1896 St. Louis Browns season =

Major League Baseball season

1896 St. Louis Browns
- League: National League
- Ballpark: New Sportsman's Park
- City: St. Louis, Missouri
- Record: 40–90 (.308)
- League place: 11th
- Owners: Chris von der Ahe
- Managers: Harry Diddlebock (7–10); Arlie Latham (0–3); Chris von der Ahe (0–2); Roger Connor (8–37); Tommy Dowd (25–38)
- Stats: ESPN.com; Baseball Reference

The 1896 St. Louis Browns season was the team's 15th season in St. Louis, Missouri and the fifth season in the National League. The Browns went 40–90 during the season and finished tenth in the National League.

== Regular season ==
=== Season standings ===
National League
Team	W	L	Pct.	GB	Home	Road
Baltimore Orioles	90	39	.698	—	49‍–‍16	41‍–‍23
Cleveland Spiders	80	48	.625	9½	43‍–‍19	37‍–‍29
Cincinnati Reds	77	50	.606	12	51‍–‍15	26‍–‍35
Boston Beaneaters	74	57	.565	17	42‍–‍24	32‍–‍33
Chicago Colts	71	57	.555	18½	42‍–‍24	29‍–‍33
Pittsburgh Pirates	66	63	.512	24	35‍–‍31	31‍–‍32
New York Giants	64	67	.489	27	39‍–‍26	25‍–‍41
Philadelphia Phillies	62	68	.477	28½	42‍–‍27	20‍–‍41
Washington Senators	58	73	.443	33	38‍–‍29	20‍–‍44
Brooklyn Bridegrooms	58	73	.443	33	35‍–‍28	23‍–‍45
St. Louis Browns	40	90	.308	50½	27‍–‍34	13‍–‍56
Louisville Colonels	38	93	.290	53	25‍–‍37	13‍–‍56

=== Record vs. opponents ===
1896 National League record Sources:
Team	BAL	BSN	BRO	CHI	CIN	CLE	LOU	NYG	PHI	PIT	STL	WAS
Baltimore	—	5–7	6–6	7–4–2	10–2	3–8–1	10–2	9–3	12–0	9–2	9–3	10–2
Boston	7–5	—	10–2	3–9	5–6	5–7–1	8–4	7–5	7–5	7–5	8–4	7–5
Brooklyn	6–6	2–10	—	6–6	2–10	5–7	8–4	4–8	8–4	6–5–1	7–5	4–8–1
Chicago	4–7–2	9–3	6–6	—	4–6–1	2–9–1	9–3	5–7	4–8	11–1	9–3	8–4
Cincinnati	2–10	6–5	10–2	6–4–1	—	6–5	9–3	6–6	8–4	5–7	12–0	7–4
Cleveland	8–3–1	7–5–1	5–7	9–2–1	5–6	—	8–3–2	7–5	6–6	4–8–1	10–2	9–3–1
Louisville	2–10	4–8	4–8	3–9	3–9	3–8–2	—	4–8–1	7–5	2–10	3–9	3–9
New York	3–9	5–7	8–4	7–5	6–6	5–7	8–4–1	—	3–8	4–8	9–3–1	6–6
Philadelphia	0–12	5–7	4–8	8–4	4–8	6–6	5–7	8–3	—	6–6	8–3	8–4
Pittsburgh	2–9	5–7	5–6–1	1–11	7–5	8–4–1	10–2	8–4	6–6	—	8–3	6–6
St. Louis	3–9	4–8	5–7	3–9	0–12	2–10	9–3	3–9–1	3–8	3–8	—	5–7
Washington	2–10	5–7	8–4–1	4–8	4–7	3–9–1	9–3	6–6	4–8	6–6	5–7	—

=== Roster ===
1896 St. Louis Browns
Roster
Pitchers: Ted Breitenstein; Red Donahue; Bill Hart; Bill Kissinger; Dewey McDougal; John Wood	Catchers: Ed McFarland; Morgan Murphy; Infielders: Roger Connor; Monte Cross; Tommy Dowd; Arlie Latham; Bert Myers; Joe Quinn	Outfielders: Duff Cooley; Klondike Douglass; Tom Niland; Tom Parrott; Biff Sheehan; Joe Sullivan; Tuck Turner	Manager: Roger Connor; Harry Diddlebock; Tommy Dowd; Arlie Latham; Chris von der Ahe

== Player stats ==
=== Batting ===
==== Starters by position ====
Note: Pos = Position; G = Games played; AB = At bats; H = Hits; Avg. = Batting average; HR = Home runs; RBI = Runs batted in

Pos	Player	G	AB	H	Avg.	HR	RBI
C	Ed McFarland	33	290	70	.241	3	36
1B	Roger Connor	126	483	137	.284	11	72
2B	Tommy Dowd	126	521	138	.265	5	46
SS	Monte Cross	125	427	104	.244	6	52
3B	Bert Myers	122	454	116	.256	0	37
OF	Tuck Turner	51	203	50	.246	1	27
OF	Tom Parrott	118	474	138	.291	7	70
OF	Klondike Douglass	81	296	78	.264	1	28

==== Other batters ====
Note: G = Games played; AB = At bats; H = Hits; Avg. = Batting average; HR = Home runs; RBI = Runs batted in

Player	G	AB	H	Avg.	HR	RBI
John Sullivan	51	212	62	.292	2	21
Joe Quinn	48	191	40	.209	1	17
Morgan Murphy	49	175	45	.257	0	11
Duff Cooley	40	166	51	.307	0	13
Tom Niland	18	68	12	.176	0	3
Arlie Latham	8	35	7	.200	0	5
Biff Sheehan	6	19	3	.158	0	1

=== Pitching ===
==== Starting pitchers ====
Note: G = Games pitched; IP = Innings pitched; W = Wins; L = Losses; ERA = Earned run average; SO = Strikeouts

Player	G	IP	W	L	ERA	SO
Ted Breitenstein	44	339.2	18	26	4.48	114
Bill Hart	42	336.0	12	29	5.12	65
Red Donahue	32	267.0	7	24	5.80	70

==== Other pitchers ====
Note: G = Games pitched; IP = Innings pitched; W = Wins; L = Losses; ERA = Earned run average; SO = Strikeouts

Player	G	IP	W	L	ERA	SO
Bill Kissinger	20	136.0	2	9	6.49	22
Tom Parrott	7	42.0	1	1	6.21	8
Dewey McDougal	3	10.0	0	1	8.10	0

==== Relief pitchers ====
Note: G = Games pitched; W = Wins; L = Losses; SV = Saves; ERA = Earned run average; SO = Strikeouts

Player	G	W	L	SV	ERA	SO
John Wood	1	0	0	0	inf	0
