= 1896 in baseball =

The following are the baseball events of the year 1896 throughout the world.

== Champions ==
- Temple Cup: Baltimore Orioles over Cleveland Spiders (4–0)
- National League: Baltimore Orioles

== Statistical leaders ==
Any team shown in small text indicates a previous team a player was on during the season.

National League
Stat	Player	Total
AVG	Jesse Burkett (CLE)	.410
HR	Ed Delahanty (PHI); Bill Joyce (NYG/WAS)	11
RBI	Ed Delahanty (PHI)	126
W	Frank Killen (PIT); Kid Nichols (BSN)	30
ERA	Billy Rhines (CIN)	2.45
K	Cy Young (CLE)	140

== National League final standings ==
National League
Team	W	L	Pct.	GB	Home	Road
Baltimore Orioles	90	39	.698	—	49‍–‍16	41‍–‍23
Cleveland Spiders	80	48	.625	9½	43‍–‍19	37‍–‍29
Cincinnati Reds	77	50	.606	12	51‍–‍15	26‍–‍35
Boston Beaneaters	74	57	.565	17	42‍–‍24	32‍–‍33
Chicago Colts	71	57	.555	18½	42‍–‍24	29‍–‍33
Pittsburgh Pirates	66	63	.512	24	35‍–‍31	31‍–‍32
New York Giants	64	67	.489	27	39‍–‍26	25‍–‍41
Philadelphia Phillies	62	68	.477	28½	42‍–‍27	20‍–‍41
Washington Senators	58	73	.443	33	38‍–‍29	20‍–‍44
Brooklyn Bridegrooms	58	73	.443	33	35‍–‍28	23‍–‍45
St. Louis Browns	40	90	.308	50½	27‍–‍34	13‍–‍56
Louisville Colonels	38	93	.290	53	25‍–‍37	13‍–‍56

Locations of teams for the 1896–1897 National League seasons
National League

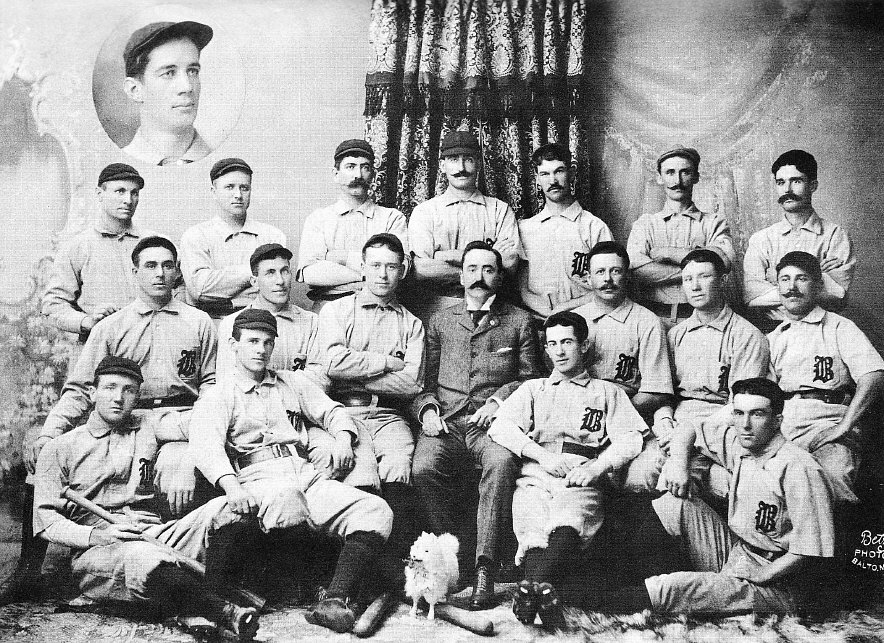
1896 Baltimore Orioles

== Notable seasons ==
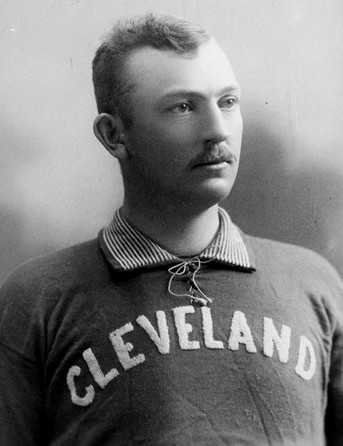
Cy Young

- Philadelphia Phillies left fielder Ed Delahanty led the NL in home runs (13), slugging percentage (.631), adjusted OPS+ (190), and runs batted in (126). He was second in the NL in total bases (315). He was third in the NL in batting average (.397) and on-base percentage (.472).
- Cleveland Spiders pitcher Cy Young had a win–loss record of 28–15 and led the NL in strikeouts (140) and shutouts (5). He was second in the NL in innings pitched (414.1). He was third in the NL in wins (28). He was fifth in the NL in earned run average (3.24) and adjusted ERA+ (140).

== Events ==
- January 5 – The Pittsburgh Pirates trade Monte Cross and Bill Hart to the St. Louis Browns for Bones Ely. The Pirates also give St. Louis $750 in cash in the deal.
- April 7 – A broken wrist that refuses to heal compels Louisville first baseman Pete Cassidy to be the first MLB player to try a newfangled medical breakthrough called the "x-ray".
- May 9 –
  - Shortstop Herman Long hits for the cycle to give the Boston Beaneaters a 17–5 victory over the Louisville Colonels.
  - The Washington Senators defeat the Pittsburgh Pirates, 14–9, in a beanball battle. Senators pitcher Win Mercer hits three Pittsburgh batters while Pirate Pink Hawley plunks three Washington batters in a disastrous 11-run seventh inning, tying a mark he set on July 4, 1894. Hawley retires in 1900 after nine seasons of play with a still-standing National League record of 195 hit batters. All told, eight batters are plunked in the contest, a National League-record five by Hawley. The five Washington batters hit by pitches ties the NL mark and won't be matched until July 2, 1969.
  - Hughie Jennings of the Baltimore Orioles knocks down Cincinnati Reds third baseman Charlie Irwin before he can catch Bid McPhee's throw. Jennings scores afterward to give the Orioles a controversial 6–5, 10-inning win over Cincinnati. Umpire Bob Emslie is escorted out of the ballpark by Cincinnati police.
- May 19 – Arlie Latham is released by the St. Louis Browns.
- May 30 – Washington Senators third baseman Bill Joyce hits for the cycle in an 8–1 victory over the Pittsburgh Pirates.
- July 13 – Philadelphia Phillies left fielder Ed Delahanty becomes the second Major Leaguer to hit four home runs in a game, two of them being inside-the-park home runs. It wasn't enough, as the Phillies lose to the Chicago Colts, 9–8. He is the only member of the "four home runs in a game" club to have an inside-the-park home run as part of his feat, and he is the first player to do so in a losing effort.
- August 1 – The Philadelphia Phillies purchased the contract of Nap Lajoie from Fall River of the New England League.

== Births ==
=== January ===
- January 17 – Harry Hanson
- January 18
  - Bill McGowan
  - Babe Twombly
- January 19 – Ollie Hanson
- January 22 – Frank Fahey
- January 23 – Billy Mullen
- January 24 – Jim Lindsey
- January 25 – Ray Schmandt
- January 27 – Milt Gaston
- January 31
  - Pinky Hargrave
  - Charlie Robertson

=== February ===
- February 3 – Chicken Hawks
- February 4 – Andy Woehr
- February 10 – Bill Whaley
- February 11 – Charles Johnston
- February 17 – Frank Emmer
- February 20 – Muddy Ruel
- February 21
  - Turkey Gross
  - Dick McCabe
- February 22 – Ferdie Moore
- February 26 – Rip Collins
- February 27
  - Will Koenigsmark
  - Cy Perkins
- February 28 – Homer Ezzell
- February 29
  - Ralph Miller
  - Roy Parker

=== March ===
- March 3 – Bert Griffith
- March 5 – Bernie Hungling
- March 8 – Lefty Clarke
- March 9 – Rube Yarrison
- March 16 – Arlas Taylor
- March 22 – Chick Holmes

=== April ===
- April 15 – Dutch Distel
- April 18 – Rip Conway
- April 20 – Harland Rowe
- April 23 – Elam Vangilder
- April 24
  - Pug Griffin
  - Ken Penner
- April 25
  - Fred Haney
  - Marty Shay
- April 27 – Rogers Hornsby
- April 29 – Johnnie Heving

=== May ===
- May 1 – Heine Meine
- May 2 – Bill Piercy
- May 3 – Bob Hasty
- May 7 – Tom Zachary
- May 16 – Red Ostergard
- May 18 – George Edmondson
- May 19
  - Merito Acosta
  - Bud Culloton
- May 24 – Leo Mangum
- May 28 – Warren Giles
- May 31 – Socks Seibold

=== June ===
- June 1
  - Johnny Mostil
  - Joel Newkirk
- June 5
  - Wade Lefler
  - Ray Richmond
- June 7 – Toussaint Allen
- June 11 – Charlie Hollocher
- June 18 – Newt Halliday
- June 25 – Earl Howard

=== July ===
- July 1 – Bert Cole
- July 3 – Curt Walker
- July 4 – Charles Wesley
- July 5
  - Buck Freeman
  - Hank Thormahlen
- July 7 – John Jenkins
- July 8 – Roy Crumpler
- July 9 – Carl Holling
- July 10 – Bill Schindler
- July 19
  - Joe Boley
  - Bob Meusel
- July 20
  - Ollie Fuhrman
  - Mutt Wilson
- July 27 – Rube Walberg
- July 29 – Eugene Keeton
- July 31 – Chick Sorrells

=== August ===
- August 4
  - Chick Galloway
  - Cliff Lee
- August 6 – Ray Blades
- August 15
  - Ben Rochefort
  - Bill Sherdel
- August 17 – Doug McWeeny
- August 23 – Cedric Durst
- August 24 – Bevo LeBourveau
- August 28 – Aaron Ward
- August 29 – Rats Henderson

=== September ===
- September 2
  - Paul Johnson
  - Harry Shriver
- September 5 – Gil Gallagher
- September 6
  - Mack Eggleston
  - Frank McCrea
  - Paul Zahniser
- September 8
  - Val Picinich
  - Johnny Schulte
- September 10 – Sammy Hale
- September 13
  - Pat Collins
  - Art Stokes
  - Roy Wilson
- September 21 – Herschel Bennett
- September 24 – Kewpie Pennington

=== October ===
- October 2 – Sid Womack
- October 5
  - Charlie Pechous
  - Danny Silva
- October 6 – Harry Heitmann
- October 8 – Tim Murchison
- October 13
  - Claude Davidson
  - Charlie See
- October 14 – Oscar Charleston
- October 15 – Mule Watson
- October 16 – John Brock
- October 19 – Bob O'Farrell
- October 20 – Wid Matthews
- October 22 – Sam Bohne
- October 27 – Frank Okrie
- October 28 – Roxy Snipes
- October 30 – Clyde Manion
- October 31 – Leo Dickerman

=== November ===
- November 2 – Chick Maynard
- November 8 – Bucky Harris
- November 10 – Jimmy Dykes
- November 14 – Red Sheridan
- November 15 – Bert Ellison
- November 16 – Ivy Griffin
- November 17 – Sam Post
- November 18 – Bill Hughes
- November 20 – Cecil Duff
- November 22 – Bill Hollahan
- November 23 – Dick Reichle
- November 27 – John Singleton
- November 29 – Joe DeBerry

=== December ===
- December 2
  - Gene Bedford
  - Mike Wilson
- December 4 – Allen Conkwright
- December 6
  - Bob Larmore
  - Frank Luce
- December 10 – Spoke Emery
- December 11 – Johnny Walker
- December 13 – Denny Williams
- December 14 – Charlie Hargreaves
- December 17 – Jim Mattox
- December 26 – Herman Pillette

== Deaths ==
- January 4 – Tom Foley, 49, outfielder.
- January 22 – George Heubel, 47, outfielder for two seasons in the National Association, 1871–1872, and one in the National League, 1876.
- March 16 – Kid Madden, 28, pitcher for the Boston Beaneaters, Boston Reds, and Baltimore Orioles from 1887 to 1891.
- May 3 – George McVey, 30, first baseman/catcher.
- June 4 – John Hauck, 66, owner of the Cincinnati Red Stockings in the mid-1880s.
- July 23 – Jack Beach, 34, outfielder.
- August 5 – Ben Stephens, 28, pitcher.
- August 29 – Curt Welch, 34, center fielder in the American Association who led league in doubles with 1889 Athletics and scored 100 runs five times.
- September 20 – Ed Crane, 34, pitcher/outfielder for nine seasons, most prominently for the New York Giants.
- September 23 – John Crowley, 34, catcher for the 1884 Philadelphia Quakers.
- September 26 – John Curran, 44, appeared in three games for the 1876 Philadelphia Athletics.
- November 10 – Jim Ritz, 22, third baseman.
- December 30 – Dave Birdsall, 58, outfielder.
