= 1896 Washington Senators season =

1896 Washington Senators
- League: National League
- Ballpark: Boundary Field
- City: Washington, D.C.
- Record: 58–73 (.443)
- League place: T–9th
- Owners: J. Earl Wagner
- Managers: Gus Schmelz

The 1896 Washington Senators baseball team finished the season with a 58–73 record, tied for ninth place in the National League.

== Regular season ==
=== Season standings ===
National League
Team	W	L	Pct.	GB	Home	Road
Baltimore Orioles	90	39	.698	—	49‍–‍16	41‍–‍23
Cleveland Spiders	80	48	.625	9½	43‍–‍19	37‍–‍29
Cincinnati Reds	77	50	.606	12	51‍–‍15	26‍–‍35
Boston Beaneaters	74	57	.565	17	42‍–‍24	32‍–‍33
Chicago Colts	71	57	.555	18½	42‍–‍24	29‍–‍33
Pittsburgh Pirates	66	63	.512	24	35‍–‍31	31‍–‍32
New York Giants	64	67	.489	27	39‍–‍26	25‍–‍41
Philadelphia Phillies	62	68	.477	28½	42‍–‍27	20‍–‍41
Washington Senators	58	73	.443	33	38‍–‍29	20‍–‍44
Brooklyn Bridegrooms	58	73	.443	33	35‍–‍28	23‍–‍45
St. Louis Browns	40	90	.308	50½	27‍–‍34	13‍–‍56
Louisville Colonels	38	93	.290	53	25‍–‍37	13‍–‍56

=== Record vs. opponents ===
1896 National League record Sources:
Team	BAL	BSN	BRO	CHI	CIN	CLE	LOU	NYG	PHI	PIT	STL	WAS
Baltimore	—	5–7	6–6	7–4–2	10–2	3–8–1	10–2	9–3	12–0	9–2	9–3	10–2
Boston	7–5	—	10–2	3–9	5–6	5–7–1	8–4	7–5	7–5	7–5	8–4	7–5
Brooklyn	6–6	2–10	—	6–6	2–10	5–7	8–4	4–8	8–4	6–5–1	7–5	4–8–1
Chicago	4–7–2	9–3	6–6	—	4–6–1	2–9–1	9–3	5–7	4–8	11–1	9–3	8–4
Cincinnati	2–10	6–5	10–2	6–4–1	—	6–5	9–3	6–6	8–4	5–7	12–0	7–4
Cleveland	8–3–1	7–5–1	5–7	9–2–1	5–6	—	8–3–2	7–5	6–6	4–8–1	10–2	9–3–1
Louisville	2–10	4–8	4–8	3–9	3–9	3–8–2	—	4–8–1	7–5	2–10	3–9	3–9
New York	3–9	5–7	8–4	7–5	6–6	5–7	8–4–1	—	3–8	4–8	9–3–1	6–6
Philadelphia	0–12	5–7	4–8	8–4	4–8	6–6	5–7	8–3	—	6–6	8–3	8–4
Pittsburgh	2–9	5–7	5–6–1	1–11	7–5	8–4–1	10–2	8–4	6–6	—	8–3	6–6
St. Louis	3–9	4–8	5–7	3–9	0–12	2–10	9–3	3–9–1	3–8	3–8	—	5–7
Washington	2–10	5–7	8–4–1	4–8	4–7	3–9–1	9–3	6–6	4–8	6–6	5–7	—

=== Roster ===
1896 Washington Senators
Roster
Pitchers: Varney Anderson; Jake Boyd; Carney Flynn; Les German; John Gilroy; Silver King; John Malarkey; Al Maul; Doc McJames; Win Mercer; Effie Norton	Catchers: Duke Farrell; Pat McCauley; Deacon McGuire; Infielders: Ed Cartwright; Jack Crooks; Gene DeMontreville; Bill Joyce; John O'Brien; Jim Rogers; Harvey Smith; Zeke Wrigley	Outfielders: Charlie Abbey; Tom Brown; Billy Lush; Kip Selbach	Manager: Gus Schmelz

== Player stats ==
=== Batting ===
==== Starters by position ====
Note: Pos = Position; G = Games played; AB = At bats; H = Hits; Avg. = Batting average; HR = Home runs; RBI = Runs batted in

Pos	Player	G	AB	H	Avg.	HR	RBI
C	Deacon McGuire	108	389	125	.321	2	70
1B	Ed Cartwright	133	499	138	.277	1	62
2B	John O'Brien	73	270	72	.267	4	33
SS	Gene DeMontreville	133	533	183	.343	8	77
3B	Bill Joyce	81	310	97	.313	8	51
OF	Kip Selbach	127	487	148	.304	5	100
OF	Billy Lush	97	352	87	.247	4	45
OF	Tom Brown	116	435	128	.294	2	59

==== Other batters ====
Note: G = Games played; AB = At bats; H = Hits; Avg. = Batting average; HR = Home runs; RBI = Runs batted in

Player	G	AB	H	Avg.	HR	RBI
Charlie Abbey	79	301	79	.262	1	49
Jim Rogers	38	154	43	.279	1	30
Harvey Smith	36	131	36	.275	0	17
Duke Farrell	37	130	39	.300	1	30
Jack Crooks	25	84	24	.286	3	20
Pat McCauley	26	84	21	.250	3	11
Zeke Wrigley	5	9	1	.111	0	2

=== Pitching ===
==== Starting pitchers ====
Note: G = Games pitched; IP = Innings pitched; W = Wins; L = Losses; ERA = Earned run average; SO = Strikeouts

Player	G	IP	W	L	ERA	SO
Win Mercer	46	366.1	25	18	4.13	94
Doc McJames	37	280.1	12	20	4.27	103
Les German	28	166.2	2	20	6.32	20
Silver King	22	145.1	10	7	4.09	35
Al Maul	8	62.0	5	2	3.63	18
Jake Boyd	4	32.0	1	2	6.75	6
Varney Anderson	2	9.0	0	2	13.00	0
John Malarkey	1	7.0	0	1	1.29	0

==== Other pitchers ====
Note: G = Games pitched; IP = Innings pitched; W = Wins; L = Losses; ERA = Earned run average; SO = Strikeouts

Player	G	IP	W	L	ERA	SO
Effie Norton	8	44.0	3	1	3.07	13
Carney Flynn	4	20.0	0	1	8.55	3

==== Relief pitchers ====
Note: G = Games pitched; W = Wins; L = Losses; SV = Saves; ERA = Earned run average; SO = Strikeouts

Player	G	W	L	SV	ERA	SO
Charlie Abbey	1	0	0	0	4.50	0
John Gilroy	1	0	0	0	0.00	0
