= 1896 Cincinnati Reds season =

1896 Cincinnati Reds
- League: National League
- Ballpark: League Park
- City: Cincinnati
- Record: 77–50 (.606)
- League place: 3rd
- Owners: John T. Brush
- Managers: Buck Ewing

The 1896 Cincinnati Reds season was a season in American baseball. The team finished in third place in the National League with a record of 77–50, 12 games behind the Baltimore Orioles.

== Regular season ==
After a late season collapse by the Reds in 1895, in which the team won only fourteen of their last thirty-nine games to fall completely out of the pennant race to an eighth-place finish, the club began to make changes to get younger players.

Buck Ewing returned as player-manager, and the team made a big trade, as Arlie Latham, Ed McFarland, Morgan Murphy and Tom Parrott were traded from Cincinnati to the St. Louis Browns for Red Ehret and Heinie Peitz. Ehret struggled in 1895, with a 6–19 record and a 6.02 ERA. His best season came in 1890 with the Louisville Colonels of the American Association, when Ehret was 25–14 with a 2.53 ERA in 43 games. Ehret also led the National League in shutouts with four during the 1893 season with the Pittsburgh Pirates. Peitz hit .284 with two home runs and 65 RBI with the Browns in 1895.

The Reds also acquired Charlie Irwin from the Chicago Colts to play third base. Irwin missed most of the 1895 season, but in 1894 he batted .296 with eight home runs and 100 RBI with Chicago.

Offensively, Eddie Burke led the team with a .340 batting average and 120 runs scored, as well as hitting a homer and 52 RBI. Dummy Hoy also scored 120 runs, as he hit .298 with a team tying high four home runs and 57 RBI. Dusty Miller had a club high .321 average, 93 RBI and 76 stolen bases, as well as tying Hoy with four home runs. Bid McPhee had another solid season, as he hit .305 with a homer and 87 RBI while stealing 48 bases.

Frank Dwyer led the pitching staff with a 24–11 record and a 3.15 ERA in 36 games, 34 of them starts. Ehret went 18–14 with a 3.42 ERA in his first season with the Reds, which marked a big improvement over his horrible 1895 season with the Browns. Billy Rhines led the league with a 2.45 ERA, however, he missed some time due to injuries and finished the year with a record of 8–6 in 19 games.

=== Season summary ===
After starting the year with a 9–7 record and in fifth place, Cincinnati posted ten wins in their next twelve games to improve to 19–9, and sit in first place in the National League. The Reds slipped out of first place with a 3–5 record in their next eight games, and continued to slump to a 27–20 record, fourth in the league. Cincinnati then rebounded, going 14–2 in their next sixteen games to push their record to 41–22, and be in a first place tie with the Baltimore Orioles. The club stayed hot, going 12–2 in their next fourteen games to push their record to 53–24, and take over first place by themselves, three games up on the Orioles. Cincinnati then went 8–2 in their next ten games, and pushed their first place lead to five games over Baltimore, and a 34–6 record in their last forty games. Despite a solid 8–5 record in their next thirteen games, Cincinnati saw their five-game lead evaporate to only a half game over the red hot Orioles. As the season was coming to a close, the Reds completely fell out of the pennant race, as they lost eleven games in a row and would eventually finish in third place with a 77–50 record, 12.5 games behind Baltimore.

=== Season standings ===
National League
Team	W	L	Pct.	GB	Home	Road
Baltimore Orioles	90	39	.698	—	49‍–‍16	41‍–‍23
Cleveland Spiders	80	48	.625	9½	43‍–‍19	37‍–‍29
Cincinnati Reds	77	50	.606	12	51‍–‍15	26‍–‍35
Boston Beaneaters	74	57	.565	17	42‍–‍24	32‍–‍33
Chicago Colts	71	57	.555	18½	42‍–‍24	29‍–‍33
Pittsburgh Pirates	66	63	.512	24	35‍–‍31	31‍–‍32
New York Giants	64	67	.489	27	39‍–‍26	25‍–‍41
Philadelphia Phillies	62	68	.477	28½	42‍–‍27	20‍–‍41
Washington Senators	58	73	.443	33	38‍–‍29	20‍–‍44
Brooklyn Bridegrooms	58	73	.443	33	35‍–‍28	23‍–‍45
St. Louis Browns	40	90	.308	50½	27‍–‍34	13‍–‍56
Louisville Colonels	38	93	.290	53	25‍–‍37	13‍–‍56

=== Record vs. opponents ===
1896 National League record Sources:
Team	BAL	BSN	BRO	CHI	CIN	CLE	LOU	NYG	PHI	PIT	STL	WAS
Baltimore	—	5–7	6–6	7–4–2	10–2	3–8–1	10–2	9–3	12–0	9–2	9–3	10–2
Boston	7–5	—	10–2	3–9	5–6	5–7–1	8–4	7–5	7–5	7–5	8–4	7–5
Brooklyn	6–6	2–10	—	6–6	2–10	5–7	8–4	4–8	8–4	6–5–1	7–5	4–8–1
Chicago	4–7–2	9–3	6–6	—	4–6–1	2–9–1	9–3	5–7	4–8	11–1	9–3	8–4
Cincinnati	2–10	6–5	10–2	6–4–1	—	6–5	9–3	6–6	8–4	5–7	12–0	7–4
Cleveland	8–3–1	7–5–1	5–7	9–2–1	5–6	—	8–3–2	7–5	6–6	4–8–1	10–2	9–3–1
Louisville	2–10	4–8	4–8	3–9	3–9	3–8–2	—	4–8–1	7–5	2–10	3–9	3–9
New York	3–9	5–7	8–4	7–5	6–6	5–7	8–4–1	—	3–8	4–8	9–3–1	6–6
Philadelphia	0–12	5–7	4–8	8–4	4–8	6–6	5–7	8–3	—	6–6	8–3	8–4
Pittsburgh	2–9	5–7	5–6–1	1–11	7–5	8–4–1	10–2	8–4	6–6	—	8–3	6–6
St. Louis	3–9	4–8	5–7	3–9	0–12	2–10	9–3	3–9–1	3–8	3–8	—	5–7
Washington	2–10	5–7	8–4–1	4–8	4–7	3–9–1	9–3	6–6	4–8	6–6	5–7	—

=== Game log ===
Legend
Reds Win	Reds Loss	Game Tied/Postponed

1896 Game Log: 77–50 (Home: 51–15; Away: 26–35)
April: 6–4 (Home: 6–4; Away: 0–0)

#	Date	Opponent	Score	Stadium	Attendance	Record	Streak
1	April 16	Pirates	1–9	League Park	14,419	0-1	L1
2	April 17	Pirates	7–10	League Park	2,412	0-2	L2
3	April 18	Pirates	11–9	League Park	3,452	1-2	W1
4	April 19	Colonels	12–3	League Park	16,526	2-2	W2
5	April 21	Spiders	10–11	League Park	3,852	2-3	L1
6	April 22	Spiders	7–4	League Park	2,556	3-3	W1
-	April 23	Spiders	Postponed (rain); Makeup: April 24				
7	April 24	Spiders	8–4	League Park	2,920	4-3	W2
8	April 25	Colts	3–5	League Park	5,296	4-4	L1
9	April 26	Colts	11–3	League Park	10,752	5-4	W1
10	April 27	Colts	9–3	League Park	2,260	6-4	W2
-	April 30	@ Spiders	Postponed (rain, site change); Makeup: July 26				

May: 16–10 (Home: 13–6; Away: 3–4)

#	Date	Opponent	Score	Stadium	Attendance	Record	Streak
11	May 2	@ Spiders	1–4	League Park	2,800	6-5	L1
12	May 3	@ Colonels	5–3	Eclipse Park	8,500	7-5	W1
13	May 4	Beaneaters	8–2	League Park	3,308	8-5	W2
14	May 5	Beaneaters	3–8	League Park	3,376	8-6	L1
15	May 6	Beaneaters	6–0	League Park	2,412	9-6	W1
16	May 7	Orioles	1–6	League Park	3,568	9-7	L1
17	May 8	Orioles	9–5	League Park	2,892	10-7	W1
18	May 9	Orioles	5–6	League Park	6,080	10-8	L1
19	May 10	Senators	18–11	League Park	8,082	11-8	W1
20	May 11	Senators	10–2	League Park	1,182	12-8	W2
21	May 12	Senators	4–6	League Park	1,428	12-9	L1
22	May 14	Bridegrooms	13–2	League Park	1,787	13-9	W2
23	May 16	Bridegrooms	2–1	League Park	4,372	14-9	W3
24	May 17	Bridegrooms	16–10	League Park	11,400	15-9	W4
25	May 18	Phillies	9–5	League Park	2,572	16-9	W5
26	May 19	Phillies	8–2	League Park	3,560	17-9	W6
27	May 20	Phillies	4–0	League Park	2,128	18-9	W7
28	May 21	Giants	4–2	League Park	5,256	19-9	W8
29	May 22	Giants	1–4	League Park	2,268	19-10	L1
30	May 23	Giants	2–4	League Park	5,392	19-11	L2
31	May 24	Colonels	6–0	League Park	9,716	20-11	W1
32	May 26	@ Senators	18–5	Boundary Field	8,717	21-11	W2
33	May 27	@ Senators	10–6	Boundary Field	2,389	22-11	W3
34	May 29	@ Orioles	1–4	Union Park	2,013	22-12	L1
35	May 30 1	@ Orioles	5–6	Union Park	3,845	22-13	L2
36	May 30 2	@ Orioles	6–9	Union Park	10,510	22-14	L3

June: 18–8 (Home: 4–0; Away: 14–8)

#	Date	Opponent	Score	Stadium	Attendance	Record	Streak
37	June 1	@ Phillies	8–4	National League Park	7,996	23-14	W1
38	June 2	@ Phillies	14–3	National League Park	5,275	24-14	W2
39	June 3	@ Phillies	3–7	National League Park	4,136	24-15	L1
40	June 4	@ Bridegrooms	6–0	Eastern Park	3,500	25-15	W1
41	June 5	@ Bridegrooms	1–10	Eastern Park	2,500	25-16	L1
42	June 6	@ Bridegrooms	13–0	Eastern Park	7,000	26-16	W1
43	June 8	@ Giants	6–3	Polo Grounds	1,700	27-16	W2
44	June 9	@ Giants	4–7	Polo Grounds	3,800	27-17	L1
45	June 10	@ Giants	6–10	Polo Grounds	2,500	27-18	L2
46	June 11	@ Beaneaters	1–9	South End Grounds	3,147	27-19	L3
47	June 12	@ Beaneaters	3–15	South End Grounds	2,455	27-20	L4
48	June 13	@ Beaneaters	6–1	South End Grounds	8,300	28-20	W1
49	June 15	Browns	7–1	League Park	3,560	29-20	W2
50	June 16	Browns	3–2	League Park	3,344	30-20	W3
51	June 17	Browns	6–1	League Park	2,812	31-20	W4
52	June 20	Colonels	13–7	League Park	5,052	32-20	W5
53	June 21	@ Colts	6–1	West Side Park	10,000	33-20	W6
54	June 22	@ Colts	1–3	West Side Park	2,000	33-21	L1
55	June 23	@ Colts	5–7	West Side Park	1,800	33-22	L2
56	June 24	@ Colts	4–2	West Side Park	2,500	34-22	W1
57	June 25	@ Browns	5–3	New Sportsman's Park	1,500	35-22	W2
58	June 26	@ Browns	16–4	New Sportsman's Park	600	36-22	W3
59	June 27	@ Browns	5–2	New Sportsman's Park	1,800	37-22	W4
60	June 28	@ Browns	12–1	New Sportsman's Park	3,500	38-22	W5
61	June 29	@ Colonels	20–8	Eclipse Park	1,908	39-22	W6
62	June 30	@ Colonels	9–2	Eclipse Park	700	40-22	W7

July: 21–7 (Home: 19–6; Away: 2–1)

#	Date	Opponent	Score	Stadium	Attendance	Record	Streak
63	July 2	Browns	7–5	League Park	5,220	41-22	W8
64	July 3	@ Pirates	3–6	Exposition Park	N/A	41-23	L1
65	July 4 1	@ Pirates	3–1	Exposition Park	7,000	42-23	W1
66	July 4 2	@ Pirates	3–4	Exposition Park	6,500	42-24	L1
67	July 5	Browns	7–0	League Park	7,868	43-24	W1
68	July 6	Phillies	10–6	League Park	3,932	44-24	W2
69	July 7	Phillies	14–4	League Park	5,322	45-24	W3
70	July 8	Phillies	3–2	League Park	3,712	46-24	W4
-	July 9	Senators	Postponed (rain); Makeup: July 10				
71	July 10 1	Senators	9–6	League Park	N/A	47-24	W5
72	July 10 2	Senators	12–4	League Park	10,068	48-24	W6
73	July 11	Senators	9–5	League Park	5,700	49-24	W7
74	July 12	Bridegrooms	9–5	League Park	11,188	50-24	W8
75	July 13	Bridegrooms	7–5	League Park	2,700	51-24	W9
76	July 14	Bridegrooms	5–4	League Park	2,704	52-24	W10
77	July 16	Orioles	5–0	League Park	8,400	53-24	W11
78	July 18	Orioles	3–10	League Park	15,896	53-25	L1
79	July 19	Orioles	6–14	League Park	24,944	53-26	L2
-	July 20	Giants	Postponed (rain); Makeup: July 21				
80	July 21 1	Giants	4–0	League Park	N/A	54-26	W1
81	July 21 2	Giants	4–2	League Park	4,042	55-26	W2
82	July 22	Giants	9–8	League Park	1,837	56-26	W3
-	July 23	Beaneaters	Postponed (rain); Makeup: July 25				
83	July 25 1	Beaneaters	10–5	League Park	N/A	57-26	W4
84	July 25 2	Beaneaters	3–2	League Park	11,436	58-26	W5
85	July 26	Spiders	10–1	League Park	17,844	59-26	W6
86	July 27	Spiders	3–1	League Park	5,060	60-26	W7
87	July 28	Spiders	9–8	League Park	7,380	61-26	W8
88	July 29	Spiders	1–6	League Park	5,492	61-27	L1
89	July 30	Pirates	4–8	League Park	1,855	61-28	L2
90	July 31	Pirates	7–9	League Park	4,786	61-29	L3

August: 8–12 (Home: 6–0; Away: 2–12)

#	Date	Opponent	Score	Stadium	Attendance	Record	Streak
-	August 1	Pirates	Postponed (rain); Makeup: August 6				
91	August 2	Browns	2–1	League Park	6,888	62-29	W1
-	August 3	Browns	Postponed (schedule change); Makeup: July 2				
92	August 6	Pirates	4–2	League Park	4,564	63-29	W2
93	August 8	Colonels	5–2	League Park	2,696	64-29	W3
94	August 9	Colonels	5–4	League Park	5,281	65-29	W4
95	August 11	@ Colts	0–6	West Side Park	6,000	65-30	L1
96	August 12	@ Colts	3–3	West Side Park	7,000	65-30	L1
97	August 13	@ Colts	7–0	West Side Park	9,000	66-30	W1
-	August 15	@ Browns	Postponed (site change); Makeup: August 15				
98	August 15	Browns	7–3	League Park	6,012	67-30	W2
-	August 16	@ Browns	Postponed (site change); Makeup: August 16				
99	August 16	Browns	10–5	League Park	6,844	68-30	W3
-	August 17	@ Browns	Postponed (schedule change); Makeup: June 26				
100	August 19	@ Beaneaters	9–7	South End Grounds	3,000	69-30	W4
101	August 20	@ Beaneaters	6–8	South End Grounds	4,000	69-31	L1
102	August 21	@ Beaneaters	9–10	South End Grounds	4,174	69-32	L2
103	August 22	@ Senators	2–9	Boundary Field	2,310	69-33	L3
-	August 24	@ Senators	Postponed (wet grounds); Makeup: August 25				
104	August 25 1	@ Senators	3–4	Boundary Field	N/A	69-34	L4
105	August 25 2	@ Senators	1–3	Boundary Field	4,791	69-35	L5
106	August 26	@ Orioles	3–14	Union Park	4,405	69-36	L6
107	August 27	@ Orioles	3–9	Union Park	4,366	69-37	L7
108	August 28	@ Orioles	6–8	Union Park	4,217	69-38	L8
109	August 29	@ Phillies	4–5	National League Park	9,214	69-39	L9
110	August 31	@ Phillies	4–6	National League Park	3,927	69-40	L10

September: 8–10 (Home: 2–0; Away: 6–10)

#	Date	Opponent	Score	Stadium	Attendance	Record	Streak
111	September 1	@ Phillies	6–9	National League Park	4,309	69-41	L11
112	September 2	@ Giants	4–0	Polo Grounds	2,500	70-41	W1
113	September 3	@ Giants	5–10	Polo Grounds	2,400	70-42	L1
114	September 4	@ Giants	5–15	Polo Grounds	2,400	70-43	L2
115	September 5	@ Bridegrooms	5–3	Eastern Park	1,500	71-43	W1
116	September 7 1	@ Bridegrooms	1–6	Eastern Park	2,500	71-44	L1
117	September 7 2	@ Bridegrooms	3–1	Eastern Park	5,000	72-44	W1
-	September 9	@ Colonels	Postponed (late arrival, both teams); Makeup: September 11				
118	September 10	@ Colonels	2–3	Eclipse Park	1,500	72-45	L1
119	September 11	@ Colonels	2–3	Eclipse Park	1,400	72-46	L2
120	September 12	@ Colonels	5–6	Eclipse Park	1,800	72-47	L3
121	September 13	Colts	7–3	League Park	4,178	73-47	W1
122	September 14	@ Pirates	2–3	Exposition Park	1,500	73-48	L1
-	September 15	@ Pirates	Postponed (rain); Makeup: September 16				
123	September 16 1	@ Pirates	11–0	Exposition Park	N/A	74-48	W1
124	September 16 2	@ Pirates	4–0	Exposition Park	2,500	75-48	W2
125	September 19	@ Spiders	2–21	League Park	400	75-49	L1
126	September 20	Colonels	4–3	League Park	2,578	76-49	W1
127	September 21	@ Spiders	1–4	League Park	2,000	76-50	L1
128	September 22	@ Spiders	7–3	League Park	2,000	77-50	W1
-	September 26	@ Colts	Postponed (schedule change, site change); Makeup: June 24				

=== Roster ===
1896 Cincinnati Reds
Roster
Pitchers: Wiley Davis; Frank Dwyer; Red Ehret; Chauncey Fisher; Brownie Foreman; Frank Foreman; Hank Gastright; Bert Inks; Billy Rhines	Catchers: Heinie Peitz; Infielders: Buck Ewing; Bill Gray; Charlie Irwin; Bid McPhee; Germany Smith; Farmer Vaughn	Outfielders: Eddie Burke; Bug Holliday; Dummy Hoy; Dusty Miller	Manager: Buck Ewing

== Player stats ==
=== Batting ===
==== Starters by position ====
Note: Pos = Position; G = Games played; AB = At bats; H = Hits; Avg. = Batting average; HR = Home runs; RBI = Runs batted in

Pos	Player	G	AB	H	Avg.	HR	RBI
C	Heinie Peitz	68	211	63	.299	2	34
1B	Buck Ewing	69	263	73	.278	1	38
2B	Bid McPhee	117	433	132	.305	1	87
SS	Germany Smith	120	456	131	.287	3	71
3B	Charlie Irwin	127	476	141	.296	1	67
OF	Eddie Burke	122	521	177	.340	1	52
OF	Dusty Miller	125	504	162	.321	4	93
OF	Dummy Hoy	121	443	132	.298	4	57

==== Other batters ====
Note: G = Games played; AB = At bats; H = Hits; Avg. = Batting average; HR = Home runs; RBI = Runs batted in

Player	G	AB	H	Avg.	HR	RBI
Farmer Vaughn	114	433	127	.293	2	66
Bill Gray	46	121	25	.207	0	17
Bug Holliday	29	84	27	.321	0	8

=== Pitching ===
==== Starting pitchers ====
Note: G = Games pitched; IP = Innings pitched; W = Wins; L = Losses; ERA = Earned run average; SO = Strikeouts

Player	G	IP	W	L	ERA	SO
Frank Dwyer	36	288.2	24	11	3.15	57
Red Ehret	34	276.2	18	14	3.42	60
Frank Foreman	27	185.2	14	7	3.97	33
Billy Rhines	19	143.0	8	6	2.45	32
Brownie Foreman	4	23.0	1	3	11.35	9
Bert Inks	3	20.0	1	1	4.50	2

==== Other pitchers ====
Note: G = Games pitched; IP = Innings pitched; W = Wins; L = Losses; ERA = Earned run average; SO = Strikeouts

Player	G	IP	W	L	ERA	SO
Chauncey Fisher	27	159.2	10	7	4.45	25

==== Relief pitchers ====
Note: G = Games pitched; W = Wins; L = Losses; SV = Saves; ERA = Earned run average; SO = Strikeouts

Player	G	W	L	SV	ERA	SO
Wiley Davis	2	1	1	0	8.31	1
Hank Gastright	1	0	0	0	4.50	0
Bug Holliday	1	0	0	0	0.00	0
