= Sal Campfield =

American baseball player (1868–1952)

- Pitcher
- Born: February 19, 1868; Meadville, Pennsylvania, U.S.
- Died: May 16, 1952 (aged 84); Meadville, Pennsylvania, U.S.
- Batted: Right Threw: Right

MLB debut
- May 15, 1896, for the New York Giants

Last MLB appearance
- July 1, 1896, for the New York Giants

MLB statistics
- Win–loss record: 1–1
- Earned run average: 4.00
- Strikeouts: 6
- Stats at Baseball Reference

Teams
- New York Giants (1896)

William Holton Campfield (February 19, 1868 – May 16, 1952) was an American pitcher in Major League Baseball who played for the New York Giants in its 1896 season.
