= 1896 Pittsburgh Pirates season =

1896 Pittsburgh Pirates
- League: National League
- Ballpark: Exposition Park
- City: Allegheny, Pennsylvania
- Record: 66–63 (.512)
- League place: 6th
- Owners: William Kerr and Phil Auten
- Managers: Connie Mack

The 1896 Pittsburgh (Note: Until early in the 20th century, the name of Pittsburgh was spelled both with and without the final 'h'.) Pirates season was the 15th season of the Pittsburgh Pirates franchise; their tenth in the National League. The Pirates finished sixth in the National League with a record of 66–63.

== Regular season ==
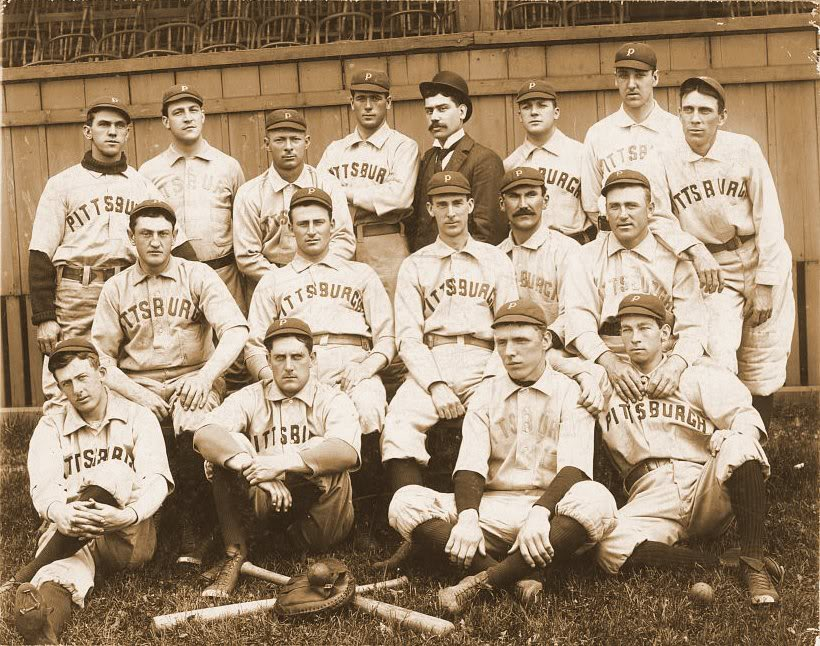
The 1896 Pittsburgh Pirates

=== Season standings ===
National League
Team	W	L	Pct.	GB	Home	Road
Baltimore Orioles	90	39	.698	—	49‍–‍16	41‍–‍23
Cleveland Spiders	80	48	.625	9½	43‍–‍19	37‍–‍29
Cincinnati Reds	77	50	.606	12	51‍–‍15	26‍–‍35
Boston Beaneaters	74	57	.565	17	42‍–‍24	32‍–‍33
Chicago Colts	71	57	.555	18½	42‍–‍24	29‍–‍33
Pittsburgh Pirates	66	63	.512	24	35‍–‍31	31‍–‍32
New York Giants	64	67	.489	27	39‍–‍26	25‍–‍41
Philadelphia Phillies	62	68	.477	28½	42‍–‍27	20‍–‍41
Washington Senators	58	73	.443	33	38‍–‍29	20‍–‍44
Brooklyn Bridegrooms	58	73	.443	33	35‍–‍28	23‍–‍45
St. Louis Browns	40	90	.308	50½	27‍–‍34	13‍–‍56
Louisville Colonels	38	93	.290	53	25‍–‍37	13‍–‍56

=== Record vs. opponents ===
1896 National League record Sources:
Team	BAL	BSN	BRO	CHI	CIN	CLE	LOU	NYG	PHI	PIT	STL	WAS
Baltimore	—	5–7	6–6	7–4–2	10–2	3–8–1	10–2	9–3	12–0	9–2	9–3	10–2
Boston	7–5	—	10–2	3–9	5–6	5–7–1	8–4	7–5	7–5	7–5	8–4	7–5
Brooklyn	6–6	2–10	—	6–6	2–10	5–7	8–4	4–8	8–4	6–5–1	7–5	4–8–1
Chicago	4–7–2	9–3	6–6	—	4–6–1	2–9–1	9–3	5–7	4–8	11–1	9–3	8–4
Cincinnati	2–10	6–5	10–2	6–4–1	—	6–5	9–3	6–6	8–4	5–7	12–0	7–4
Cleveland	8–3–1	7–5–1	5–7	9–2–1	5–6	—	8–3–2	7–5	6–6	4–8–1	10–2	9–3–1
Louisville	2–10	4–8	4–8	3–9	3–9	3–8–2	—	4–8–1	7–5	2–10	3–9	3–9
New York	3–9	5–7	8–4	7–5	6–6	5–7	8–4–1	—	3–8	4–8	9–3–1	6–6
Philadelphia	0–12	5–7	4–8	8–4	4–8	6–6	5–7	8–3	—	6–6	8–3	8–4
Pittsburgh	2–9	5–7	5–6–1	1–11	7–5	8–4–1	10–2	8–4	6–6	—	8–3	6–6
St. Louis	3–9	4–8	5–7	3–9	0–12	2–10	9–3	3–9–1	3–8	3–8	—	5–7
Washington	2–10	5–7	8–4–1	4–8	4–7	3–9–1	9–3	6–6	4–8	6–6	5–7	—

=== Roster ===
1896 Pittsburgh Pirates
Roster
Pitchers: Brownie Foreman; Jot Goar; Charlie Hastings; Pink Hawley; Elmer Horton; Jim Hughey; Frank Killen	Catchers: Eddie Boyle; Bill Merritt; Joe Sugden; Infielders: Jake Beckley; Lou Bierbauer; Harry Davis; Tom Delahanty; Bones Ely; Abel Lizotte; Denny Lyons; Connie Mack; Dick Padden; Jud Smith; Harry Truby	Outfielders: Patsy Donovan; Mike Smith; Jake Stenzel; Joe Wright	Manager: Connie Mack

== Player stats ==
=== Batting ===
==== Starters by position ====
Note: Pos = Position; G = Games played; AB = At bats; H = Hits; Avg. = Batting average; HR = Home runs; RBI = Runs batted in

Pos	Player	G	AB	H	Avg.	HR	RBI
C	Joe Sugden	80	301	89	.296	0	36
1B	Jake Beckley	59	217	55	.253	3	32
2B	Dick Padden	61	219	53	.242	2	24
SS	Bones Ely	128	537	153	.285	3	77
3B	Denny Lyons	118	436	134	.307	4	71
OF	Mike Smith	122	484	175	.362	6	94
OF	Jake Stenzel	114	479	173	.361	2	82
OF	Patsy Donovan	131	573	183	.319	3	59

==== Other batters ====
Note: G = Games played; AB = At bats; H = Hits; Avg. = Batting average; HR = Home runs; RBI = Runs batted in

Player	G	AB	H	Avg.	HR	RBI
Bill Merritt	77	282	82	.291	1	42
Lou Bierbauer	59	258	74	.287	0	39
Harry Davis	44	168	32	.190	0	23
Connie Mack	33	120	26	.217	0	16
Joe Wright	15	52	16	.308	0	6
Jud Smith	10	35	12	.343	0	4
Harry Truby	8	32	5	.156	0	3
Abel Lizotte	7	29	3	.103	0	3
Eddie Boyle	2	5	0	.000	0	0
Tom Delahanty	1	3	1	.333	0	0

=== Pitching ===
==== Starting pitchers ====
Note: G = Games pitched; IP = Innings pitched; W = Wins; L = Losses; ERA = Earned run average; SO = Strikeouts

Player	G	IP	W	L	ERA	SO
Frank Killen	52	432.1	30	18	3.41	134
Pink Hawley	49	378.0	22	21	3.57	137
Charlie Hastings	17	104.0	5	10	5.88	19
Brownie Foreman	9	61.2	3	3	6.57	18
Elmer Horton	2	15.0	0	2	9.60	3

==== Other pitchers ====
Note: G = Games pitched; IP = Innings pitched; W = Wins; L = Losses; ERA = Earned run average; SO = Strikeouts

Player	G	IP	W	L	ERA	SO
Jim Hughey	25	155.0	6	8	4.99	48

==== Relief pitchers ====
Note: G = Games pitched; W = Wins; L = Losses; SV = Saves; ERA = Earned run average; SO = Strikeouts

Player	G	IP	W	L	ERA	SO
Jot Goar	3	0	1	0	16.88	3
