= Effie Norton =

American baseball player (1873–1950)

- Pitcher
- Born: August 17, 1873; Conneaut, Ohio, U.S.
- Died: March 5, 1950 (aged 76); Aspinwall, Pennsylvania, U.S.
- Batted: Right Threw: Right

MLB debut
- August 8, 1896, for the Washington Senators

Last MLB appearance
- June 5, 1897, for the Washington Senators

MLB statistics
- Win–loss record: 5–2
- Earned run average: 4.13
- Strikeouts: 16
- Stats at Baseball Reference

Teams
- Washington Senators (1896–1897)

Elisha Strong Norton (August 17, 1873 – March 5, 1950), also nicknamed "Leiter," was an American right-handed professional baseball pitcher who played from 1896 to 1897 for the Washington Senators. He is the great-grandfather in law of pitcher John Fulgham.

Prior to playing professional baseball, Norton attended Ohio State University, where, in 1895, he was the "star" of the team.

He made his big league debut on August 8, 1896. He went 3–1 with a 3.07 ERA in eight games (five starts). In 44 innings, he had 14 walks and 13 strikeouts. The following season, he went 2–1 with a 6.88 ERA in 17 innings. He walked 11 and struck out three. Although a pitcher by trade, he also played three games in the outfield that season. On June 5, 1897, he played his final big league game.

Overall, Norton went five and two with a 4.13 ERA in 61 innings (12 games, seven games started). He walked 25 batters and struck out 13. For a pitcher, he wasn't a bad hitter. He hit .243 in 37 career at-bats.

After his death, he was buried at Conneaut City Cemetery in Conneaut, Ohio.
