= Frank Freund =

American baseball player (1875–1933)

- Catcher
- Born: July 5, 1875; Jeffersonville, Indiana, U.S.
- Died: November 5, 1933 (aged 58); Jeffersonville, Indiana, U.S.
- Batted: Unknown Threw: Right

MLB debut
- August 2, 1896, for the Louisville Colonels

Last MLB appearance
- August 3, 1896, for the Louisville Colonels

MLB statistics
- Batting average: .200
- Home runs: 0
- Runs batted in: 0
- Stats at Baseball Reference

Teams
- Louisville Colonels (1896)

Lawrence Joseph Freund (July 5, 1875 – November 5, 1933) was an American Major League Baseball (MLB) catcher for the Louisville Colonels during the 1896 season.
