= Harvey Smith (baseball) =

American baseball player (1871–1962)

- Third Baseman
- Born: July 24, 1871; Union Deposit, Pennsylvania, U.S.
- Died: November 12, 1962 (aged 91); Harrisburg, Pennsylvania, U.S.
- Batted: Left Threw: Right

MLB debut
- August 19, 1896, for the Washington Senators

Last MLB appearance
- September 26, 1896, for the Washington Senators

MLB statistics
- Batting average: .275
- Stolen bases: 9
- Runs batted in: 17
- Stats at Baseball Reference

Teams
- Washington Senators (1896)

Harvey Fetterhoff Smith (July 24, 1871 – November 12, 1962) was a professional baseball player. He played third base in the National League for the Washington Senators in 1896. He went to college at Bucknell University.

Smith has traditionally been credited with discovering fellow Bucknell pitcher Christy Mathewson while playing in an 1899 alumni game.
