= Tom Niland =

American baseball player (1870–1950)

- Outfielder
- Born: April 14, 1870; Brookfield, Massachusetts, U.S.
- Died: April 30, 1950 (aged 80); Lynn, Massachusetts, U.S.
- Batted: Right Threw: Right

MLB debut
- April 19, 1896, for the St. Louis Browns

Last MLB appearance
- June 6, 1896, for the St. Louis Browns

MLB statistics
- Batting average: .176
- Home runs: 0
- Runs batted in: 3
- Stats at Baseball Reference

Teams
- St. Louis Browns (1896)

Thomas James Niland (April 14, 1870 – April 30, 1950), nicknamed "Honest John", was an American professional baseball player. He played for the St. Louis Browns of the National League in 1896.
