= Bill Yerrick =

American baseball player (1874–1936)

- Pitcher
- Born: February 26, 1874; Danville, Pennsylvania, U.S.
- Died: September 8, 1936 (aged 62); Danville, Pennsylvania, U.S.
- Batted: Right Threw: Right

MLB debut
- September 27, 1895, for the Boston Beaneaters

Last MLB appearance
- September 1, 1896, for the Boston Beaneaters

MLB statistics
- Win–loss record: 1-3
- Strikeouts: 10
- Earned run average: 8.10
- Stats at Baseball Reference

Teams
- Boston Beaneaters (1895–96)

William John Yerrick (February 26, 1874 – September 8, 1936) was an American professional baseball pitcher. He played parts of two seasons in Major League Baseball for the Boston Beaneaters in 1895-96.
