= Ben Ellis (baseball) =

American baseball player (1870–1931)

- Third baseman
- Born: July 1870; New York City, U.S.
- Died: July 26, 1931 (aged 60–61); Schenectady, New York, U.S.
- Batted: Unknown Threw: Unknown

MLB debut
- July 16, 1896, for the Philadelphia Phillies

Last MLB appearance
- August 22, 1896, for the Philadelphia Phillies

MLB statistics
- Games played: 4
- At bats: 16
- Hits: 1
- Stats at Baseball Reference

Teams
- Philadelphia Phillies (1896)

Alfred Benjamin Ellis (July 1870 – July 26, 1931) was an American infielder in Major League Baseball who played for the Philadelphia Phillies during the 1896 season. He was born in New York City.

Basically a third baseman, Ellis played all infield positions, except first base, and also served as a corner outfielder. In four career games, he collected one hit in 16 career at-bats and received three walks for a .063 batting average and a .211 on-base percentage, respectively. It is unknown which hand he batted and threw with.

In addition, he played or managed in the Minor leagues during eight seasons spanning 1893–1900.

Ellis died in Schenectady, New York, at the age of 61.
