= Dewey McDougal =

American baseball player (1871–1935)

- Pitcher
- Born: September 19, 1871; Aledo, Illinois, U.S.
- Died: April 28, 1935 (aged 63); Galesburg, Illinois, U.S.
- Batted: Unknown Threw: Right

MLB debut
- April 24, 1895, for the St. Louis Browns

Last MLB appearance
- May 12, 1896, for the St. Louis Browns

MLB statistics
- Win–loss record: 3–11
- Strikeouts: 23
- Earned run average: 8.30
- Stats at Baseball Reference

Teams
- St. Louis Browns (1895–1896)

James H. "Dewey" McDougal (September 19, 1871 – April 28, 1935) was an American professional baseball player who was a pitcher in the Major Leagues from 1895–1896 for the St. Louis Browns.

McDougal was born in Aledo, Illinois and died in Galesburg, Illinois.
