= Dan Leahy (baseball) =

American baseball player (1870–1903)

- Shortstop
- Born: August 8, 1870; Nashville, Tennessee
- Died: December 30, 1903 (aged 33); Knoxville, Tennessee
- Batted: Unknown Threw: Unknown

MLB debut
- September 2, 1896, for the Philadelphia Phillies

Last MLB appearance
- September 2, 1896, for the Philadelphia Phillies

MLB statistics
- Batting average: .333
- Home runs: 0
- Runs batted in: 1
- Stats at Baseball Reference

Teams
- Philadelphia Phillies (1896)

Daniel C. Leahy (August 8, 1870 – December 30, 1903) was a shortstop in Major League Baseball. He played two games for the Philadelphia Phillies in 1896.

Leahy was born in Nashville, Tennessee. He started his professional baseball career in 1894, with the Lynchburg Hill Climbers of the Virginia League. In 1895, he hit .309 and was acquired by the Phillies. He played in a doubleheader on September 2, going 2 for 6 at the plate.

Leahy played in the minor leagues until 1900. He was shot to death in 1903, at the age of 33.
