= 1896 New York Giants season =

1896 New York Giants
- League: National League
- Ballpark: Polo Grounds
- City: New York City
- Record: 64–67 (.489)
- League place: 7th
- Owners: Andrew Freedman
- Managers: Arthur Irwin, Bill Joyce

The 1896 New York Giants season was the franchise's 14th season. The team finished in seventh place in the National League with a 64–67 record, 27 games behind the Baltimore Orioles.

== Regular season ==
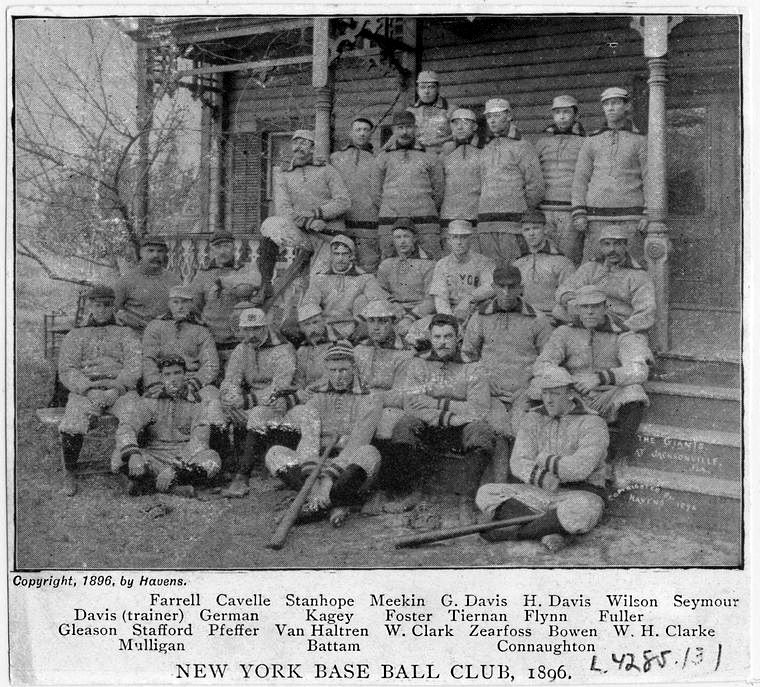

=== Season standings ===
National League
Team	W	L	Pct.	GB	Home	Road
Baltimore Orioles	90	39	.698	—	49‍–‍16	41‍–‍23
Cleveland Spiders	80	48	.625	9½	43‍–‍19	37‍–‍29
Cincinnati Reds	77	50	.606	12	51‍–‍15	26‍–‍35
Boston Beaneaters	74	57	.565	17	42‍–‍24	32‍–‍33
Chicago Colts	71	57	.555	18½	42‍–‍24	29‍–‍33
Pittsburgh Pirates	66	63	.512	24	35‍–‍31	31‍–‍32
New York Giants	64	67	.489	27	39‍–‍26	25‍–‍41
Philadelphia Phillies	62	68	.477	28½	42‍–‍27	20‍–‍41
Washington Senators	58	73	.443	33	38‍–‍29	20‍–‍44
Brooklyn Bridegrooms	58	73	.443	33	35‍–‍28	23‍–‍45
St. Louis Browns	40	90	.308	50½	27‍–‍34	13‍–‍56
Louisville Colonels	38	93	.290	53	25‍–‍37	13‍–‍56

=== Record vs. opponents ===
1896 National League record Sources:
Team	BAL	BSN	BRO	CHI	CIN	CLE	LOU	NYG	PHI	PIT	STL	WAS
Baltimore	—	5–7	6–6	7–4–2	10–2	3–8–1	10–2	9–3	12–0	9–2	9–3	10–2
Boston	7–5	—	10–2	3–9	5–6	5–7–1	8–4	7–5	7–5	7–5	8–4	7–5
Brooklyn	6–6	2–10	—	6–6	2–10	5–7	8–4	4–8	8–4	6–5–1	7–5	4–8–1
Chicago	4–7–2	9–3	6–6	—	4–6–1	2–9–1	9–3	5–7	4–8	11–1	9–3	8–4
Cincinnati	2–10	6–5	10–2	6–4–1	—	6–5	9–3	6–6	8–4	5–7	12–0	7–4
Cleveland	8–3–1	7–5–1	5–7	9–2–1	5–6	—	8–3–2	7–5	6–6	4–8–1	10–2	9–3–1
Louisville	2–10	4–8	4–8	3–9	3–9	3–8–2	—	4–8–1	7–5	2–10	3–9	3–9
New York	3–9	5–7	8–4	7–5	6–6	5–7	8–4–1	—	3–8	4–8	9–3–1	6–6
Philadelphia	0–12	5–7	4–8	8–4	4–8	6–6	5–7	8–3	—	6–6	8–3	8–4
Pittsburgh	2–9	5–7	5–6–1	1–11	7–5	8–4–1	10–2	8–4	6–6	—	8–3	6–6
St. Louis	3–9	4–8	5–7	3–9	0–12	2–10	9–3	3–9–1	3–8	3–8	—	5–7
Washington	2–10	5–7	8–4–1	4–8	4–7	3–9–1	9–3	6–6	4–8	6–6	5–7	—

=== Roster ===
1896 New York Giants
Roster
Pitchers: Cy Bowen; Sal Campfield; Dad Clarke; Ed Doheny; Carney Flynn; Les German; Charlie Gettig; Jouett Meekin; Bill Reidy; Cy Seymour; Mike Sullivan	Catchers: Duke Farrell; Jack Warner; Parke Wilson; Dave Zearfoss; Infielders: Jake Beckley; Willie Clark; Frank Connaughton; George Davis; Shorty Fuller; Kid Gleason; Bill Joyce; Fred Pfeffer	Outfielders: Tom Bannon; Harry Davis; General Stafford; Mike Tiernan; George Ulrich; George Van Haltren; Other batters: Reddy Foster	Manager: Arthur Irwin; Bill Joyce

== Player stats ==
=== Batting ===
==== Starters by position ====
Note: Pos = Position; G = Games played; AB = At bats; H = Hits; Avg. = Batting average; HR = Home runs; RBI = Runs batted in

Pos	Player	G	AB	H	Avg.	HR	RBI
C	Parke Wilson	75	253	60	.237	0	23
1B	Willie Clark	72	247	72	.291	0	33
2B	Kid Gleason	133	541	162	.299	4	89
SS	Frank Connaughton	88	315	82	.260	2	43
3B	George Davis	124	494	158	.320	6	99
OF	General Stafford	59	230	66	.287	0	40
OF	George Van Haltren	133	562	197	.351	5	74
OF	Mike Tiernan	133	521	192	.369	7	89

==== Other batters ====
Note: G = Games played; AB = At bats; H = Hits; Avg. = Batting average; HR = Home runs; RBI = Runs batted in

Player	G	AB	H	Avg.	HR	RBI
Harry Davis	64	233	64	.275	2	50
Duke Farrell	58	191	54	.283	1	37
Jake Beckley	46	182	55	.302	6	38
Bill Joyce	49	165	61	.370	5	43
Shorty Fuller	18	72	12	.167	0	7
Dave Zearfoss	19	60	13	.217	0	6
Jack Warner	19	54	14	.259	0	3
George Ulrich	14	45	8	.178	0	1
Fred Pfeffer	4	14	2	.143	0	4
Tom Bannon	2	7	1	.143	0	0
Reddy Foster	1	1	0	.000	0	0

=== Pitching ===
==== Starting pitchers ====
Note: G = Games pitched; IP = Innings pitched; W = Wins; L = Losses; ERA = Earned run average; SO = Strikeouts

Player	G	IP	W	L	ERA	SO
Dad Clarke	48	351.0	17	24	4.26	66
Jouett Meekin	42	334.1	26	14	3.82	110
Mike Sullivan	25	185.1	10	13	4.16	42
Ed Doheny	17	108.1	6	7	4.49	39
Cy Seymour	11	70.1	2	4	6.40	33

==== Other pitchers ====
Note: G = Games pitched; IP = Innings pitched; W = Wins; L = Losses; ERA = Earned run average; SO = Strikeouts

Player	G	IP	W	L	ERA	SO
Sal Campfield	6	27.0	1	1	4.00	6
Charlie Gettig	4	14.0	1	0	9.64	5
Bill Reidy	2	13.0	0	1	7.62	1
Cy Bowen	2	12.0	0	1	6.00	3
Carney Flynn	3	10.2	0	2	11.81	4

==== Relief pitchers ====
Note: G = Games pitched; W = Wins; L = Losses; SV = Saves; ERA = Earned run average; SO = Strikeouts

Player	G	W	L	SV	ERA	SO
George Van Haltren	2	1	0	0	2.25	3
Les German	1	0	0	0	13.50	0
