= Josh Reilly =

American baseball player (1868–1938)

- Second baseman
- Born: May 9, 1868; San Francisco, California, U.S.
- Died: June 12, 1938 (aged 70); San Francisco, California, U.S.
- Batted: Right Threw: Right

MLB debut
- May 2, 1896, for the Chicago Colts

Last MLB appearance
- May 28, 1896, for the Chicago Colts

MLB statistics
- Batting average: .214
- Home runs: 0
- Runs batted in: 2
- Stats at Baseball Reference

Teams
- Chicago Colts (1896)

William Henry Reilly (May 9, 1868 – June 12, 1938) was an American professional baseball player who played second base in the Major Leagues for the 1896 Chicago Colts. He played in the minor leagues from 1890 through 1903, primarily in various western leagues. He also managed in the minors in 1903 and 1904.

== Sources ==
- Career statistics from Baseball Reference · Retrosheet · Baseball Almanac
