= Joe Kostal =

American baseball player (1876–1933)

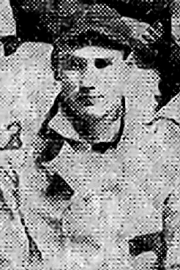
- Pitcher
- Born: June 1, 1876; Chicago, Illinois, U.S.
- Died: October 10, 1933 (aged 57); Guelph, Ontario, Canada
- Batted: Right Threw: Right

MLB debut
- July 14, 1896, for the Louisville Colonels

Last MLB appearance
- July 17, 1896, for the Louisville Colonels

MLB statistics
- Games pitched: 2
- Innings pitched: 2
- Earned run average: 0.00
- Stats at Baseball Reference

Teams
- Louisville Colonels (1896)

Joseph William Kostal (June 1, 1876 – October 10, 1933), nicknamed "Cudgey", was an American Major League Baseball player who pitched two games for the 1896 Louisville Colonels. He pitched a total of two innings, gave up four runs, zero earned runs, and was charged with one error. Kostal was born in Chicago, Illinois, and died at the age of 57 in Guelph, Ontario, Canada.
