= Elmer Horton (baseball) =

American baseball player (1866–1920)

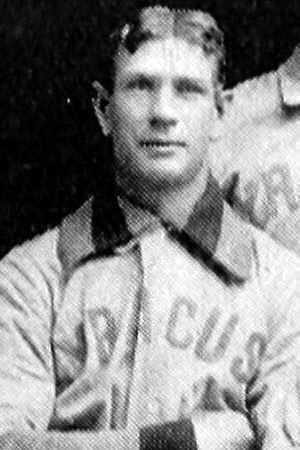
- Pitcher
- Born: September 4, 1866; Hamilton, Ohio, U.S.
- Died: August 12, 1920 (aged 53); Newark, Ohio, U.S.
- Batted: Unknown Threw: Unknown

MLB debut
- September 24, 1896, for the Pittsburgh Pirates

Last MLB appearance
- April 18, 1898, for the Brooklyn Bridegrooms

MLB statistics
- Win–loss record: 0–3
- Earned run average: 9.75
- Strikeouts: 3
- Stats at Baseball Reference

Teams
- Pittsburgh Pirates (1896); Brooklyn Bridegrooms (1898)

Ellis Elmer Horton (September 4, 1866 – August 12, 1920), nicknamed "Herky Jerky", was an American pitcher in Major League Baseball who played in two games with the Pittsburgh Pirates in 1896 and in one game for the Brooklyn Bridegrooms in 1898.
