= 1896 Boston Beaneaters season =

1896 Boston Beaneaters
- League: National League
- Ballpark: South End Grounds
- City: Boston, Massachusetts
- Record: 74–57–1 (.565)
- League place: 4th
- Owners: Arthur Soden
- Managers: Frank Selee (7th season)

The 1896 Boston Beaneaters season was the 26th season of the franchise. The Beaneaters finished with a record of 74–57–1 (.565), 4th in the National League and 17.0 games behind the first-place Baltimore Orioles.

== Regular season ==
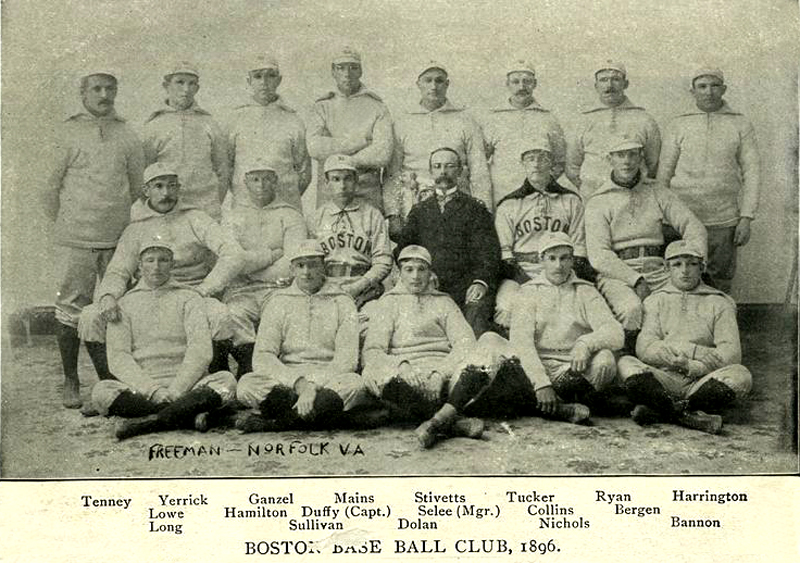
1896 Boston Beaneaters

=== Season standings ===
National League
Team	W	L	Pct.	GB	Home	Road
Baltimore Orioles	90	39	.698	—	49‍–‍16	41‍–‍23
Cleveland Spiders	80	48	.625	9½	43‍–‍19	37‍–‍29
Cincinnati Reds	77	50	.606	12	51‍–‍15	26‍–‍35
Boston Beaneaters	74	57	.565	17	42‍–‍24	32‍–‍33
Chicago Colts	71	57	.555	18½	42‍–‍24	29‍–‍33
Pittsburgh Pirates	66	63	.512	24	35‍–‍31	31‍–‍32
New York Giants	64	67	.489	27	39‍–‍26	25‍–‍41
Philadelphia Phillies	62	68	.477	28½	42‍–‍27	20‍–‍41
Washington Senators	58	73	.443	33	38‍–‍29	20‍–‍44
Brooklyn Bridegrooms	58	73	.443	33	35‍–‍28	23‍–‍45
St. Louis Browns	40	90	.308	50½	27‍–‍34	13‍–‍56
Louisville Colonels	38	93	.290	53	25‍–‍37	13‍–‍56

=== Record vs. opponents ===
1896 National League record Sources:
Team	BAL	BSN	BRO	CHI	CIN	CLE	LOU	NYG	PHI	PIT	STL	WAS
Baltimore	—	5–7	6–6	7–4–2	10–2	3–8–1	10–2	9–3	12–0	9–2	9–3	10–2
Boston	7–5	—	10–2	3–9	5–6	5–7–1	8–4	7–5	7–5	7–5	8–4	7–5
Brooklyn	6–6	2–10	—	6–6	2–10	5–7	8–4	4–8	8–4	6–5–1	7–5	4–8–1
Chicago	4–7–2	9–3	6–6	—	4–6–1	2–9–1	9–3	5–7	4–8	11–1	9–3	8–4
Cincinnati	2–10	6–5	10–2	6–4–1	—	6–5	9–3	6–6	8–4	5–7	12–0	7–4
Cleveland	8–3–1	7–5–1	5–7	9–2–1	5–6	—	8–3–2	7–5	6–6	4–8–1	10–2	9–3–1
Louisville	2–10	4–8	4–8	3–9	3–9	3–8–2	—	4–8–1	7–5	2–10	3–9	3–9
New York	3–9	5–7	8–4	7–5	6–6	5–7	8–4–1	—	3–8	4–8	9–3–1	6–6
Philadelphia	0–12	5–7	4–8	8–4	4–8	6–6	5–7	8–3	—	6–6	8–3	8–4
Pittsburgh	2–9	5–7	5–6–1	1–11	7–5	8–4–1	10–2	8–4	6–6	—	8–3	6–6
St. Louis	3–9	4–8	5–7	3–9	0–12	2–10	9–3	3–9–1	3–8	3–8	—	5–7
Washington	2–10	5–7	8–4–1	4–8	4–7	3–9–1	9–3	6–6	4–8	6–6	5–7	—

=== Roster ===
1896 Boston Beaneaters
Roster
Pitchers: Cozy Dolan; Fred Klobedanz; Ted Lewis; Willard Mains; Kid Nichols; Jack Stivetts; Jim Sullivan; Bill Yerrick	Catchers: Marty Bergen; Charlie Ganzel; Jack Ryan; Infielders: Jimmy Collins; Joe Harrington; Herman Long; Bobby Lowe; Dan McGann; Tommy Tucker; George Yeager	Outfielders: Jimmy Bannon; Hugh Duffy; Billy Hamilton; Fred Tenney	Manager: Frank Selee

== Player stats ==
=== Batting ===
==== Starters by position ====
Note: Pos = Position; G = Games played; AB = At bats; H = Hits; Avg. = Batting average; HR = Home runs; RBI = Runs batted in

Pos	Player	G	AB	H	Avg.	HR	RBI
C	Marty Bergen	65	245	66	.269	4	37
1B	Tommy Tucker	122	474	144	.304	2	72
2B	Bobby Lowe	73	306	98	.320	2	48
SS	Herman Long	120	502	173	.345	6	101
3B	Jimmy Collins	84	304	90	.296	1	46
OF	Hugh Duffy	131	527	158	.300	5	113
OF	Jimmy Bannon	89	344	87	.253	0	50
OF	Billy Hamilton	131	524	192	.366	3	55

==== Other batters ====
Note: G = Games played; AB = At bats; H = Hits; Avg. = Batting average; HR = Home runs; RBI = Runs batted in

Player	G	AB	H	Avg.	HR	RBI
Fred Tenney	88	348	117	.336	2	49
Joe Harrington	54	199	40	.201	1	25
Charlie Ganzel	47	179	47	.263	1	18
Dan McGann	43	171	55	.322	2	30
Jack Ryan	8	32	3	.094	0	0
George Yeager	2	5	1	.200	0	0

=== Pitching ===
==== Starting pitchers ====
Note: G = Games pitched; IP = Innings pitched; W = Wins; L = Losses; ERA = Earned run average; SO = Strikeouts

Player	G	IP	W	L	ERA	SO
Kid Nichols	49	372.1	30	14	2.83	102
Jack Stivetts	42	329.0	22	14	4.10	71
Jim Sullivan	31	225.1	11	12	4.03	33
Fred Klobedanz	10	80.2	6	4	3.01	26
Ted Lewis	6	41.2	1	4	3.24	12
Cozy Dolan	6	41.0	1	4	4.83	14

==== Other pitchers ====
Note: G = Games pitched; IP = Innings pitched; W = Wins; L = Losses; ERA = Earned run average; SO = Strikeouts

Player	G	IP	W	L	ERA	SO
Willard Mains	8	42.2	3	2	5.48	13
Bill Yerrick	4	23.0	0	3	10.57	6
