= Harry Keener =

American baseball player (1871–1912)

- Pitcher
- Born: August 1871; Easton, Pennsylvania, U.S.
- Died: March 25, 1912 (aged 40); Easton, Pennsylvania, U.S.
- Batted: Unknown Threw: Right

MLB debut
- July 27, 1896, for the Philadelphia Phillies

Last MLB appearance
- September 22, 1896, for the Philadelphia Phillies

MLB statistics
- Win–loss record: 3–11
- Earned run average: 5.88
- Strikeouts: 28
- Stats at Baseball Reference

Teams
- Philadelphia Phillies (1896)

Joshua Harry Keener (August, 1871 – March 25, 1912) was an American Major League Baseball pitcher who played for the 1896 Philadelphia Phillies.
