= John Wood (baseball) =

American baseball player (1872–1929)

- Pitcher
- Born: May 14, 1872; Harrisburg, Pennsylvania
- Died: January 30, 1929 (aged 56); Philadelphia
- Batted: Unknown Threw: Unknown

MLB debut
- May 9, 1896, for the St. Louis Browns

Last MLB appearance
- May 9, 1896, for the St. Louis Browns

MLB statistics
- Win–loss record: 0–0
- Innings pitched: 0
- Earned runs: 1
- Stats at Baseball Reference

Teams
- St. Louis Browns (1896)

John B. Wood (May 14, 1872 – January 30, 1929) was a professional baseball pitcher. He appeared in one game in Major League Baseball for the St. Louis Browns on May 9, 1896. He faced four batters without retiring any, giving up one hit, two walks and one hit batsman. Although he gave up just one run, he officially had an infinite earned run average.
