= 1896 Chicago Colts season =

1896 Chicago Colts
- League: National League
- Ballpark: West Side Park
- City: Chicago
- Record: 71–57 (.555)
- League place: 5th
- Owners: Albert Spalding
- Managers: Cap Anson

The 1896 Chicago Colts season was the 25th season of the Chicago Colts franchise, the 21st in the National League and the fourth at West Side Park. The Colts finished fifth in the National League with a record of 71–57.

== Regular season ==
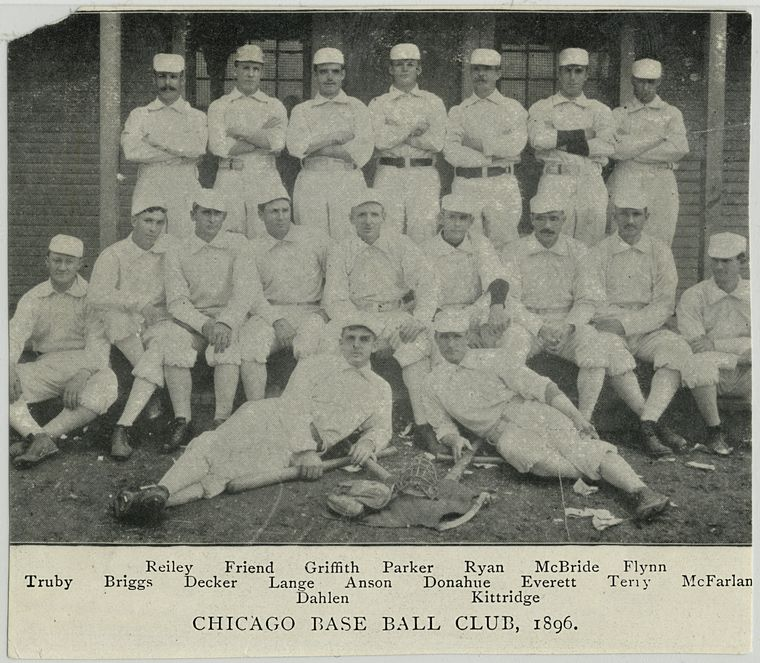

=== Season standings ===
National League
Team	W	L	Pct.	GB	Home	Road
Baltimore Orioles	90	39	.698	—	49‍–‍16	41‍–‍23
Cleveland Spiders	80	48	.625	9½	43‍–‍19	37‍–‍29
Cincinnati Reds	77	50	.606	12	51‍–‍15	26‍–‍35
Boston Beaneaters	74	57	.565	17	42‍–‍24	32‍–‍33
Chicago Colts	71	57	.555	18½	42‍–‍24	29‍–‍33
Pittsburgh Pirates	66	63	.512	24	35‍–‍31	31‍–‍32
New York Giants	64	67	.489	27	39‍–‍26	25‍–‍41
Philadelphia Phillies	62	68	.477	28½	42‍–‍27	20‍–‍41
Washington Senators	58	73	.443	33	38‍–‍29	20‍–‍44
Brooklyn Bridegrooms	58	73	.443	33	35‍–‍28	23‍–‍45
St. Louis Browns	40	90	.308	50½	27‍–‍34	13‍–‍56
Louisville Colonels	38	93	.290	53	25‍–‍37	13‍–‍56

=== Record vs. opponents ===
1896 National League record Sources:
Team	BAL	BSN	BRO	CHI	CIN	CLE	LOU	NYG	PHI	PIT	STL	WAS
Baltimore	—	5–7	6–6	7–4–2	10–2	3–8–1	10–2	9–3	12–0	9–2	9–3	10–2
Boston	7–5	—	10–2	3–9	5–6	5–7–1	8–4	7–5	7–5	7–5	8–4	7–5
Brooklyn	6–6	2–10	—	6–6	2–10	5–7	8–4	4–8	8–4	6–5–1	7–5	4–8–1
Chicago	4–7–2	9–3	6–6	—	4–6–1	2–9–1	9–3	5–7	4–8	11–1	9–3	8–4
Cincinnati	2–10	6–5	10–2	6–4–1	—	6–5	9–3	6–6	8–4	5–7	12–0	7–4
Cleveland	8–3–1	7–5–1	5–7	9–2–1	5–6	—	8–3–2	7–5	6–6	4–8–1	10–2	9–3–1
Louisville	2–10	4–8	4–8	3–9	3–9	3–8–2	—	4–8–1	7–5	2–10	3–9	3–9
New York	3–9	5–7	8–4	7–5	6–6	5–7	8–4–1	—	3–8	4–8	9–3–1	6–6
Philadelphia	0–12	5–7	4–8	8–4	4–8	6–6	5–7	8–3	—	6–6	8–3	8–4
Pittsburgh	2–9	5–7	5–6–1	1–11	7–5	8–4–1	10–2	8–4	6–6	—	8–3	6–6
St. Louis	3–9	4–8	5–7	3–9	0–12	2–10	9–3	3–9–1	3–8	3–8	—	5–7
Washington	2–10	5–7	8–4–1	4–8	4–7	3–9–1	9–3	6–6	4–8	6–6	5–7	—

== Roster ==
1896 Chicago Colts
Roster
Pitchers: Buttons Briggs; Danny Friend; Clark Griffith; Monte McFarland; Doc Parker; Adonis Terry; Walter Thornton	Catchers: Con Daily; Tim Donahue; Malachi Kittridge; Infielders: Cap Anson; Bill Dahlen; Bill Everitt; Barry McCormick; Fred Pfeffer; Josh Reilly; Harry Truby	Outfielders: George Decker; George Flynn; Bill Lange; Algie McBride; Jimmy Ryan	Manager: Cap Anson

== Player stats ==
=== Batting ===
==== Starters by position ====
Note: Pos = Position; G = Games played; AB = At bats; H = Hits; Avg. = Batting average; HR = Home runs; RBI = Runs batted in

Pos	Player	G	AB	H	Avg.	HR	RBI
C	Malachi Kittridge	65	215	48	.223	1	19
1B	Cap Anson	108	402	133	.331	2	90
2B	Fred Pfeffer	94	360	88	.244	2	52
SS	Bill Dahlen	125	474	167	.352	9	74
3B	Bill Everitt	132	575	184	.320	2	46
OF	George Decker	107	421	118	.280	5	61
OF	Jimmy Ryan	128	489	149	.305	3	86
OF	Bill Lange	122	469	153	.326	4	92

==== Other batters ====
Note: G = Games played; AB = At bats; H = Hits; Avg. = Batting average; HR = Home runs; RBI = Runs batted in

Player	G	AB	H	Avg.	HR	RBI
Tim Donahue	57	188	41	.218	0	20
Barry McCormick	45	168	37	.220	1	23
Harry Truby	29	109	28	.257	2	31
George Flynn	29	106	27	.255	0	4
Josh Reilly	9	42	9	.214	0	2
Algie McBride	9	29	7	.241	1	7
Con Daily	9	27	2	.074	0	1
Walter Thornton	9	22	8	.364	0	1

=== Pitching ===
==== Starting pitchers ====
Note: G = Games pitched; IP = Innings pitched; W = Wins; L = Losses; ERA = Earned run average; SO = Strikeouts

Player	G	IP	W	L	ERA	SO
Clark Griffith	36	317.2	23	11	3.54	81
Danny Friend	36	290.2	18	14	4.74	86
Adonis Terry	30	235.2	15	14	4.43	75
Buttons Briggs	26	194.0	12	8	4.31	84
Doc Parker	9	73.0	1	5	6.16	15
Walter Thornton	5	23.2	2	1	5.70	10

==== Other pitchers ====
Note: G = Games pitched; IP = Innings pitched; W = Wins; L = Losses; ERA = Earned run average; SO = Strikeouts

Player	G	IP	W	L	ERA	SO
Monte McFarland	4	25.0	0	4	7.20	3

==== Relief pitchers ====
Note: G = Games pitched; W = Wins; L = Losses; SV = Saves; ERA = Earned run average; SO = Strikeouts

Player	G	W	L	SV	ERA	SO
Malachi Kittridge	1	0	0	0	5.40	0
