= Cy Bowen =

American baseball player (1871–1925)

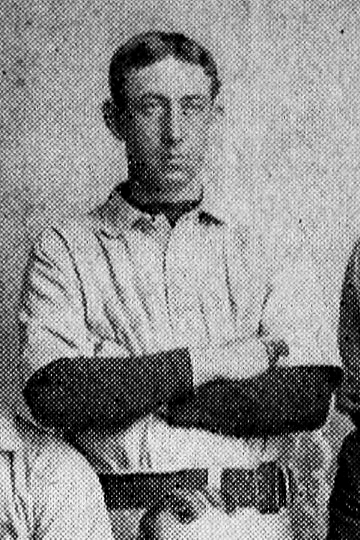
- Pitcher
- Born: February 17, 1871; Kingston, Indiana, US
- Died: January 25, 1925 (aged 53); Greensburg, Indiana, US
- Batted: Right Threw: Right

MLB debut
- April 28, 1896, for the New York Giants

Last MLB appearance
- April 28, 1896, for the New York Giants

MLB statistics
- Win–loss record: 0–1
- Earned run average: 6.00
- Strikeouts: 3
- Stats at Baseball Reference

Teams
- New York Giants (1896)

Sutherland McCoy "Cy" Bowen (February 17, 1871 – January 25, 1925) was a professional baseball player. He was a right-handed pitcher for one season (1896) with the New York Giants. In his career, he compiled a 0–1 record, with a 6.00 earned run average, and 3 strikeouts in 12 innings pitched.
