= William Gallagher (baseball) =

American baseball player (1874–1950)

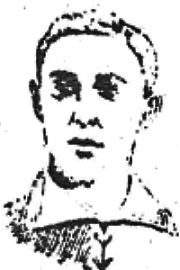
- Shortstop / Catcher
- Born: February 4, 1874; Lowell, Massachusetts, U.S.
- Died: March 11, 1950 (aged 76); Worcester, Massachusetts, U.S.
- Batted: Right handed Threw: Right handed

MLB debut
- August 19, 1896, for the Philadelphia Phillies

Last MLB appearance
- September 1, 1896, for the Philadelphia Phillies

MLB statistics
- Batting average: .306
- Home runs: 0
- Runs batted in: 6
- Stats at Baseball Reference

Teams
- Philadelphia Phillies (1896)

William Gallagher (February 4, 1874 – March 11, 1950) was an American Major League Baseball shortstop.

== Sources ==
- Career statistics from Baseball Reference · Baseball Reference (Minors) · Retrosheet · Baseball Almanac
