= 1896 Major League Baseball season =

1896 MLB season
- League: National League (NL)
- Sport: Baseball
- Duration: Regular season: April 16 – September 26, 1896; Temple Cup: October 2–8, 1896
- Games: 132
- Teams: 12

Pennant winner
- NL champions: Baltimore Orioles
- NL runners-up: Cleveland Spiders

Temple Cup
- Venue: League Park, Cleveland, Ohio; Union Park, Baltimore, Maryland
- Champions: Baltimore Orioles
- Runners-up: Cleveland Spiders

MLB seasons
- ← 1895 1897 →

Locations of teams for the 1896–1897 National League seasons
National League

The 1896 major league baseball season began on April 16, 1896. The regular season ended on September 26, with the Baltimore Orioles as the pennant winner of the National League and the Cleveland Spiders as runner-up. In a rematch of the previous season, the postseason began with Game 1 of the third Temple Cup on October 2 and ended with Game 4 on October 8. The Orioles swept the Spiders, capturing their first Temple Cup.

The 1896 Temple Cup was the only one of four Temple Cups which saw the NL pennant winner win the championship series.

== Schedule ==
The 1896 schedule consisted of 132 games for the twelve teams of the National League. Each team was scheduled to play 12 games against the other eleven teams in the league. This continued the format put in place since 1893 and would be used until 1898.

Opening Day took place on April 16 featuring all twelve teams. The final day of the season was on September 26, featuring ten teams. The Temple Cup took place between October 2 and October 8.

=== Tripleheader ===
The 1896 season featured an extremely rare tripleheader—the second of three in National League and major-league history, having previously occurred only in 1890—when the Baltimore Orioles hosted the Louisville Colonels on September 7 for three games. The Orioles swept the Colonels.

== Rule changes ==
The 1896 season saw the following rule changes:

- A player ejection was mandatory after the third violation of minor in-game discretions.
- Umpires must "give corners of the plate" to the pitcher, meaning that if a ball passed over any part of the plate while in the zone between shoulders and knees, the pitch must be called a strike.

== Teams ==
League	Team	City	Ballpark	Capacity	Manager
National League	Baltimore Orioles	Baltimore, Maryland	Union Park	6,500	Ned Hanlon
National League	Boston Beaneaters	Boston, Massachusetts	South End Grounds	6,600	Frank Selee
National League	Brooklyn Bridegrooms	Brooklyn, New York	Eastern Park	12,000	Dave Foutz
National League	Chicago Colts	Chicago, Illinois	West Side Park	13,000	Cap Anson
National League	Cincinnati Reds	Cincinnati, Ohio	League Park (Cincinnati)	9,000	Buck Ewing
National League	Cleveland Spiders	Cleveland, Ohio	League Park (Cleveland)	9,000	Patsy Tebeau
National League	Louisville Colonels	Louisville, Kentucky	Eclipse Park	6,400	John McCloskey
National League	Louisville Colonels	Louisville, Kentucky	Eclipse Park	6,400	Bill McGunnigle
National League	New York Giants	New York, New York	Polo Grounds	16,000	Arthur Irwin
National League	New York Giants	New York, New York	Polo Grounds	16,000	Bill Joyce
National League	Philadelphia Phillies	Philadelphia, Pennsylvania	National League Park	18,000	Billy Nash
National League	Pittsburgh Pirates	Allegheny, Pennsylvania	Exposition Park	6,500	Connie Mack
National League	St. Louis Browns	St. Louis, Missouri	New Sportsman's Park	14,500	Harry Diddlebock
National League	St. Louis Browns	St. Louis, Missouri	New Sportsman's Park	14,500	Arlie Latham
National League	St. Louis Browns	St. Louis, Missouri	New Sportsman's Park	14,500	Chris von der Ahe
National League	St. Louis Browns	St. Louis, Missouri	New Sportsman's Park	14,500	Roger Connor
National League	St. Louis Browns	St. Louis, Missouri	New Sportsman's Park	14,500	Tommy Dowd
National League	Washington Senators	Washington, D.C.	Boundary Field	6,500	Gus Schmelz

1. In today's New York, New York.
2. In today's Pittsburgh, Pennsylvania.

== Standings ==
=== National League ===
National League
Team	W	L	Pct.	GB	Home	Road
Baltimore Orioles	90	39	.698	—	49‍–‍16	41‍–‍23
Cleveland Spiders	80	48	.625	9½	43‍–‍19	37‍–‍29
Cincinnati Reds	77	50	.606	12	51‍–‍15	26‍–‍35
Boston Beaneaters	74	57	.565	17	42‍–‍24	32‍–‍33
Chicago Colts	71	57	.555	18½	42‍–‍24	29‍–‍33
Pittsburgh Pirates	66	63	.512	24	35‍–‍31	31‍–‍32
New York Giants	64	67	.489	27	39‍–‍26	25‍–‍41
Philadelphia Phillies	62	68	.477	28½	42‍–‍27	20‍–‍41
Washington Senators	58	73	.443	33	38‍–‍29	20‍–‍44
Brooklyn Bridegrooms	58	73	.443	33	35‍–‍28	23‍–‍45
St. Louis Browns	40	90	.308	50½	27‍–‍34	13‍–‍56
Louisville Colonels	38	93	.290	53	25‍–‍37	13‍–‍56

=== Tie games ===
14 tie games, which are not factored into winning percentage or games behind (and were often replayed again), occurred throughout the season.

- Baltimore Orioles, 3
- Boston Beaneaters, 1
- Brooklyn Bridegrooms, 2
- Chicago Colts, 4
- Cincinnati Reds, 1
- Cleveland Spiders, 7
- Louisville Colonels, 3
- New York Giants, 2
- Pittsburgh Pirates, 2
- St. Louis Browns, 1
- Washington Senators, 2

== Postseason ==
=== Bracket ===
Temple Cup
NL1	Baltimore Orioles	7	7	6	5
NL2	Cleveland Spiders	1	2	2	0

== Managerial changes ==
=== Off-season ===
Team	Former Manager	New Manager
New York Giants	Harvey Watkins	Arthur Irwin
Philadelphia Phillies	Arthur Irwin	Billy Nash
St. Louis Browns	Lou Phelan	Harry Diddlebock

=== In-season ===
Team	Former Manager	New Manager
Louisville Colonels	John McCloskey	Bill McGunnigle
New York Giants	Arthur Irwin	Bill Joyce
St. Louis Browns	Harry Diddlebock	Arlie Latham
St. Louis Browns	Arlie Latham	Chris von der Ahe
St. Louis Browns	Chris von der Ahe	Roger Connor
St. Louis Browns	Roger Connor	Tommy Dowd

== League leaders ==
Any team shown in small text indicates a previous team a player was on during the season.

=== National League ===
Hitting leaders
Stat	Player	Total
AVG	Jesse Burkett (CLE)	.410
OPS	Ed Delahanty (PHI)	1.103
HR	Ed Delahanty (PHI); Bill Joyce (NYG/WAS)	11
RBI	Ed Delahanty (PHI)	126
R	Jesse Burkett (CLE)	160
H	Jesse Burkett (CLE)	240
SB	Joe Kelley (BAL)	87

Pitching leaders
Stat	Player	Total
W	Frank Killen (PIT); Kid Nichols (BSN)	30
L	Bill Hart (STL)	29
ERA	Billy Rhines (CIN)	2.45
K	Cy Young (CLE)	140
IP	Frank Killen (PIT)	432.1
SV	Cy Young (CLE)	3
WHIP	Billy Rhines (CIN)	1.231

== Milestones ==
=== Batters ===
==== Four home runs in one game ====
- Ed Delahanty (PHI):
  - Became the second player to hit four home runs in one game in a 9–8 loss against the Chicago Colts on July 13. He remains the only player to achieve this feat by having an inside-the-park home run (of which two were).

==== Other batting accomplishments ====
- Bid McPhee (CIN):
  - Recorded his 500th career stolen base, becoming the sixth player to reach this mark. It is unknown what day this stolen base occurred.
- Billy Hamilton (BSN):
  - Recorded his 700th career stolen base, becoming the second player to reach this mark. It is unknown what day this stolen base occurred.
- Arlie Latham (STL):
  - Set the major league record for most career stolen bases when he stole his 741st base. It is unknown what day this stolen base occurred.

==== Cycles ====
- Herman Long (BSN):
  - Long hit for his first cycle and first in franchise history, on May 9 against the Louisville Colonels.
- Bill Joyce (NYG/WAS):
  - Joyce hit for his first cycle and third in franchise history as a part of the Washington Senators, in game one of a doubleheader on May 30 against the Pittsburgh Pirates.

=== Miscellaneous ===
- Baltimore Orioles / Louisville Colonels:
  - Play in the second of three Major League tripleheader in history on September 7. Baltimore sweeps Louisville.

== Home field attendance ==
Team name	Wins	%±	Home attendance	%±	Per game
Cincinnati Reds	77	16.7%	373,000	32.7%	5,652
Philadelphia Phillies	62	−20.5%	357,025	−24.8%	5,174
Chicago Colts	71	−1.4%	317,500	−17.0%	4,669
New York Giants	64	−3.0%	274,000	14.2%	4,152
Baltimore Orioles	90	3.4%	249,448	−14.9%	3,723
Boston Beaneaters	74	4.2%	240,000	−0.8%	3,582
Washington Senators	58	34.9%	223,000	45.8%	3,279
Brooklyn Bridegrooms	58	−18.3%	201,000	−12.6%	3,092
Pittsburgh Pirates	66	−7.0%	197,000	4.8%	2,985
St. Louis Browns	40	2.6%	184,000	8.2%	2,968
Cleveland Spiders	80	−4.8%	152,000	6.3%	2,375
Louisville Colonels	38	8.6%	133,000	44.6%	2,078

== See also ==
- 1896 in baseball (Events, Births, Deaths)
