= Charles Johnston (umpire) =

American baseball umpire (1896-1988)

- Born: Charles Edward Johnston; February 11, 1896; Coleman, Texas, U.S.
- Died: August 29, 1988 (aged 92); Finksburg, Maryland, U.S.
- Occupation: Umpire
- Years active: 1936-1937
- Employer: American League

Charles Edward Johnston (February 11, 1896 – August 29, 1988) was an American Major League Baseball umpire who worked in the American League in 1936 and 1937. Johnson umpired 270 Major League games.
