= Will Koenigsmark =

American baseball player (1896–1972)

- Pitcher
- Born: February 27, 1896; Belleville, Illinois, U.S.
- Died: July 1, 1972 (aged 76); Waterloo, Illinois, U.S.
- Batted: Right Threw: Right

MLB debut
- September 10, 1919, for the St. Louis Cardinals

Last MLB appearance
- September 10, 1919, for the St. Louis Cardinals

MLB statistics
- Games: 1
- Earned run average: ∞
- Strikeouts: 0
- Stats at Baseball Reference

Teams
- St. Louis Cardinals (1919)

Willis Thomas Koenigsmark (February 27, 1896 – July 1, 1972) was an American Major League Baseball pitcher who played one game in 1919 with the St. Louis Cardinals.

Koenigsmark, who batted and threw right-handed, came in as a reliever in the top of the eighth on September 10, 1919 against the Brooklyn Robins with an 11-2 lead. He walked a batter, then gave up two consecutive hits -- and was then relieved, and never played in the majors again. The Cardinals hung on to win the game 11-8, in front of a crowd of only 500 fans. As two of the runners Koenigsmark allowed came around to score, Koenigsmark retired with an ERA of infinity.

He was born in Belleville, Illinois, and died in Waterloo, Illinois.
