= Wiley Davis =

American baseball player (1875–1942)

- Pitcher
- Born: August 1, 1875; Seymour, Tennessee
- Died: September 22, 1942 (aged 67); Detroit, Michigan
- Batted: Right Threw: Right

MLB debut
- April 18, 1896, for the Cincinnati Reds

Last MLB appearance
- April 21, 1896, for the Cincinnati Reds

MLB statistics
- Win–loss record: 1–1
- Earned run average: 8.31
- Strikeouts: 1
- Stats at Baseball Reference

Teams
- Cincinnati Reds (1896)

Wiley Anderson Davis (August 1, 1875 – September 22, 1942), is a former Major League Baseball pitcher. He played in two games for the Cincinnati Reds of the National League on April 18 & 21, 1896. He played in the Southeastern League in 1897 and the Western League in 1898.
