= Charlie Irwin =

American baseball player (1869–1925)

- Third baseman
- Born: February 15, 1869; Clinton, Illinois, U.S.
- Died: September 21, 1925 (aged 56); Chicago, Illinois, U.S.
- Batted: Left Threw: Right

MLB debut
- September 3, 1893, for the Chicago Colts

Last MLB appearance
- October 3, 1902, for the Brooklyn Superbas

MLB statistics
- Batting average: .268
- Home runs: 16
- Runs batted in: 493
- Stats at Baseball Reference

Teams
- Chicago Colts (1893–1895); Cincinnati Reds (1896–1901); Brooklyn Superbas (1901–1902)

Charles Edwin Irwin (February 15, 1869 – September 21, 1925) was an American professional baseball third baseman. He played ten seasons in Major League Baseball (MLB) between 1893 and 1902 for the Chicago Colts, Cincinnati Reds, Brooklyn Superbas.

In 991 games over 10 seasons, Irwin posted a .268 batting average (986-for-3685) with 556 runs, 16 home runs, 493 RBI, 180 stolen bases and 287 bases on balls.

== See also ==
- List of Major League Baseball career stolen bases leaders
