= Eugene Keeton =

American baseball player

- Pitcher
- Born: July 29, 1896; Hazel Green, Kentucky, U.S.
- Died: May 3 Unknown
- Batted: Unknown Threw: Unknown

Negro league baseball debut
- 1922, for the Cleveland Tate Stars

Last appearance
- 1926, for the Dayton Marcos

Teams
- Cleveland Tate Stars (1922); Dayton Marcos (1926)

Eugene Aderson Keeton (July 29, 1896 – May 3, 1938 or 1983) was an American professional baseball pitcher in the Negro leagues. He played with the Cleveland Tate Stars in 1922 and the Dayton Marcos in 1926.
