= Tom Morrison (baseball) =

American baseball player (1869–1902)

- Infielder
- Born: August 15, 1869; St. Louis, Missouri, U.S.
- Died: March 27, 1902 (aged 32); St. Louis, Missouri, U.S.
- Batted: Unknown Threw: Unknown

MLB debut
- September 18, 1895, for the Louisville Colonels

Last MLB appearance
- May 10, 1896, for the Louisville Colonels

MLB statistics
- Batting average: .204
- Stolen bases: 0
- Runs batted in: 4
- Stats at Baseball Reference

Teams
- Louisville Colonels (1895–1896)

Thomas J. Morrison (August 15, 1869 – March 27, 1902) was an American professional baseball player. He played infield in the National League for the Louisville Colonels. He appeared in a total of 14 games over the 1895 and 1896 seasons.
