= Toussaint Allen =

American baseball payer (1896–1960)

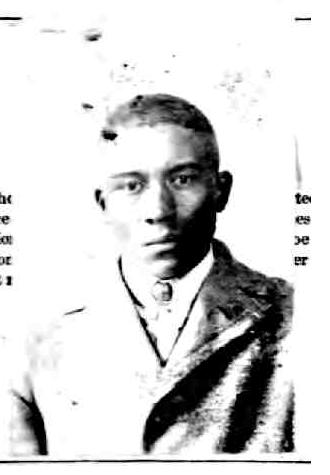
- First baseman
- Born: June 7, 1896; Atlanta, Georgia, U.S.
- Died: March 3, 1960 (aged 63); Philadelphia, Pennsylvania, U.S.
- Batted: Right Threw: Left

Negro league baseball debut
- 1914, for the Havana Red Sox

Last appearance
- 1928, for the Philadelphia Tigers
- Stats at Baseball Reference

Teams
- Havana Red Sox (1914, 1917); Hilldale Club (1919–1924); Washington Braves (1921); Bacharach Giants (1920); Wilmington Potomacs (1925); Newark Stars (1926); Philadelphia Tigers (1928)

Toussaint A. Allen (June 7, 1896 – March 3, 1960) was an American professional baseball first baseman in the Negro leagues.

He played from 1914 to 1928 with several teams. He played the majority of his career with the Hilldale Club.
