= 1896 Brooklyn Bridegrooms season =

1896 Brooklyn Bridegrooms
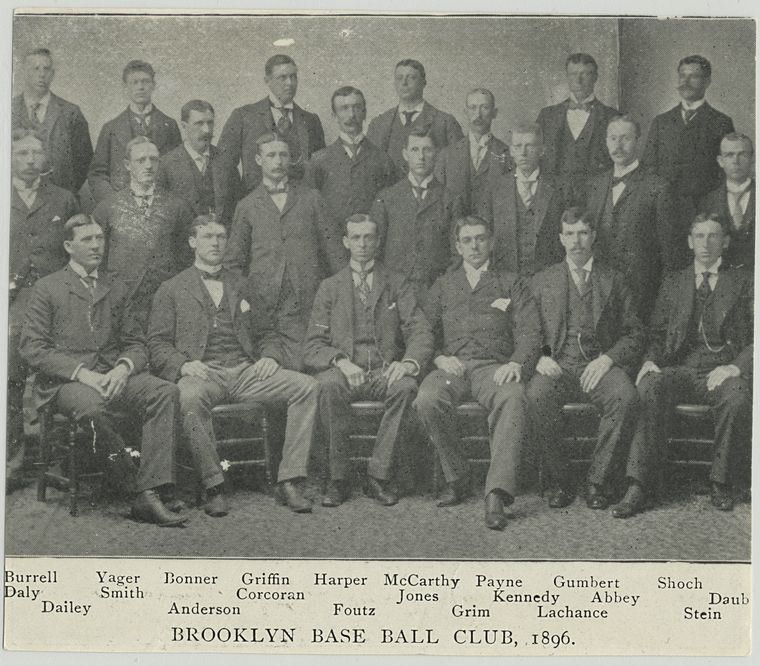
- League: National League
- Ballpark: Eastern Park
- City: Brooklyn, New York
- Record: 58–73 (.443)
- League place: T–9th
- Owners: Charles Byrne, Ferdinand Abell, George Chauncey
- President: Charles Byrne
- Managers: Dave Foutz

The 1896 Brooklyn Bridegrooms finished the season tied for ninth place in the crowded National League race.

== Offseason ==
- November 18, 1895: Tommy McCarthy was purchased by the Bridegrooms from the Boston Beaneaters.

== Regular season ==
=== Season standings ===
National League
Team	W	L	Pct.	GB	Home	Road
Baltimore Orioles	90	39	.698	—	49‍–‍16	41‍–‍23
Cleveland Spiders	80	48	.625	9½	43‍–‍19	37‍–‍29
Cincinnati Reds	77	50	.606	12	51‍–‍15	26‍–‍35
Boston Beaneaters	74	57	.565	17	42‍–‍24	32‍–‍33
Chicago Colts	71	57	.555	18½	42‍–‍24	29‍–‍33
Pittsburgh Pirates	66	63	.512	24	35‍–‍31	31‍–‍32
New York Giants	64	67	.489	27	39‍–‍26	25‍–‍41
Philadelphia Phillies	62	68	.477	28½	42‍–‍27	20‍–‍41
Washington Senators	58	73	.443	33	38‍–‍29	20‍–‍44
Brooklyn Bridegrooms	58	73	.443	33	35‍–‍28	23‍–‍45
St. Louis Browns	40	90	.308	50½	27‍–‍34	13‍–‍56
Louisville Colonels	38	93	.290	53	25‍–‍37	13‍–‍56

=== Record vs. opponents ===
1896 National League record Sources:
Team	BAL	BSN	BRO	CHI	CIN	CLE	LOU	NYG	PHI	PIT	STL	WAS
Baltimore	—	5–7	6–6	7–4–2	10–2	3–8–1	10–2	9–3	12–0	9–2	9–3	10–2
Boston	7–5	—	10–2	3–9	5–6	5–7–1	8–4	7–5	7–5	7–5	8–4	7–5
Brooklyn	6–6	2–10	—	6–6	2–10	5–7	8–4	4–8	8–4	6–5–1	7–5	4–8–1
Chicago	4–7–2	9–3	6–6	—	4–6–1	2–9–1	9–3	5–7	4–8	11–1	9–3	8–4
Cincinnati	2–10	6–5	10–2	6–4–1	—	6–5	9–3	6–6	8–4	5–7	12–0	7–4
Cleveland	8–3–1	7–5–1	5–7	9–2–1	5–6	—	8–3–2	7–5	6–6	4–8–1	10–2	9–3–1
Louisville	2–10	4–8	4–8	3–9	3–9	3–8–2	—	4–8–1	7–5	2–10	3–9	3–9
New York	3–9	5–7	8–4	7–5	6–6	5–7	8–4–1	—	3–8	4–8	9–3–1	6–6
Philadelphia	0–12	5–7	4–8	8–4	4–8	6–6	5–7	8–3	—	6–6	8–3	8–4
Pittsburgh	2–9	5–7	5–6–1	1–11	7–5	8–4–1	10–2	8–4	6–6	—	8–3	6–6
St. Louis	3–9	4–8	5–7	3–9	0–12	2–10	9–3	3–9–1	3–8	3–8	—	5–7
Washington	2–10	5–7	8–4–1	4–8	4–7	3–9–1	9–3	6–6	4–8	6–6	5–7	—

=== Roster ===
1896 Brooklyn Bridegrooms
Roster
Pitchers: Bert Abbey; Dan Daub; Ad Gumbert; George Harper; Brickyard Kennedy; Harley Payne; Ed Stein	Catchers: Buster Burrell; John Grim; Infielders: Frank Bonner; Tommy Corcoran; Tom Daly; Candy LaChance; Billy Shindle; George Shoch	Outfielders: John Anderson; Dave Foutz; Mike Griffin; Fielder Jones; Tommy McCarthy	Manager: Dave Foutz

== Player stats ==
=== Batting ===
==== Starters by position ====
Note: Pos = Position; G = Games played; AB = At bats; R = Runs; H = Hits; Avg. = Batting average; HR = Home runs; RBI = Runs batted in; SB = Stolen bases

Pos	Player	G	AB	R	H	Avg.	HR	RBI	SB
C	John Grim	81	281	32	75	.267	2	35	7
1B	Candy LaChance	89	348	60	99	.284	7	58	17
2B	Tom Daly	67	224	43	63	.281	3	29	19
3B	Billy Shindle	131	516	75	144	.279	1	61	24
SS	Tommy Corcoran	132	532	63	154	.289	3	73	16
OF	Mike Griffin	122	493	101	152	.308	4	51	23
OF	Fielder Jones	104	395	82	140	.354	3	46	18
OF	Tommy McCarthy	104	377	62	94	.249	3	47	22

==== Other batters ====
Note: G = Games played; AB = At bats; R = Runs; H = Hits; Avg. = Batting average; HR = Home runs; RBI = Runs batted in; SB = Stolen bases

Player	G	AB	R	H	Avg.	HR	RBI	SB
John Anderson	108	430	70	135	.314	1	55	37
George Shoch	76	250	36	73	.292	1	28	11
Buster Burrell	62	206	19	62	.301	0	23	1
Frank Bonner	9	34	8	6	.176	0	5	1
Dave Foutz	2	8	0	2	.250	0	0	0

=== Pitching ===
==== Starting pitchers ====
Note: G = Games pitched; GS = Games started; IP = Innings pitched; W = Wins; L = Losses; ERA = Earned run average; BB = Bases on balls; SO = Strikeouts; CG = Complete games

Player	G	GS	IP	W	L	ERA	BB	SO	CG
Brickyard Kennedy	42	38	305.2	17	20	4.42	130	76	28
Harley Payne	34	28	241.2	14	16	3.39	58	52	24
Dan Daub	32	24	225.0	12	11	3.60	63	53	18
Bert Abbey	25	18	164.1	8	8	5.15	48	37	12
George Harper	16	11	86.0	4	8	5.55	39	22	11
Ad Gumbert	5	4	31.0	0	4	3.77	11	3	2

==== Other pitchers ====
Note: G = Games pitched; GS = Games started; IP = Innings pitched; W = Wins; L = Losses; ERA = Earned run average; BB = Bases on balls; SO = Strikeouts; CG = Complete games

Player	G	GS	IP	W	L	ERA	BB	SO	CG
Ed Stein	17	10	90.1	3	6	4.88	51	16	6
