= Roy Parker (baseball) =

American baseball player (1896–1954)

- Pitcher
- Born: February 29, 1896; Union, Missouri
- Died: May 17, 1954 (aged 58); Tulsa, Oklahoma
- Batted: Right Threw: Right

MLB debut
- September 10, 1919, for the St. Louis Cardinals

Last MLB appearance
- September 16, 1919, for the St. Louis Cardinals

MLB statistics
- Games played: 2
- Innings pitched: 2
- Earned run average: 31.50
- Stats at Baseball Reference

Teams
- St. Louis Cardinals (1919)

Roy William Parker (February 29, 1896 – May 17, 1954) was an American pitcher in Major League Baseball. After serving in the United States Navy during World War I, he played for the St. Louis Cardinals in 1919.
