= 1896 Cleveland Spiders season =

1896 Cleveland Spiders
- League: National League
- Ballpark: League Park
- City: Cleveland, Ohio
- Record: 80–48 (.625)
- League place: 2nd
- Owners: Frank Robison
- Managers: Patsy Tebeau

The 1896 Cleveland Spiders season was a season in American baseball. The team finished with an 80–48 record and a second-place finish in the National League. After the season they played the first-place Baltimore Orioles in the Temple Cup series. The same two teams had met the previous season, with the second-place Spiders beating the first-place Orioles 4 games to 1, but this year the results were reversed, as the Spiders were swept in four straight.

== Regular season ==
=== Season standings ===
National League
Team	W	L	Pct.	GB	Home	Road
Baltimore Orioles	90	39	.698	—	49‍–‍16	41‍–‍23
Cleveland Spiders	80	48	.625	9½	43‍–‍19	37‍–‍29
Cincinnati Reds	77	50	.606	12	51‍–‍15	26‍–‍35
Boston Beaneaters	74	57	.565	17	42‍–‍24	32‍–‍33
Chicago Colts	71	57	.555	18½	42‍–‍24	29‍–‍33
Pittsburgh Pirates	66	63	.512	24	35‍–‍31	31‍–‍32
New York Giants	64	67	.489	27	39‍–‍26	25‍–‍41
Philadelphia Phillies	62	68	.477	28½	42‍–‍27	20‍–‍41
Washington Senators	58	73	.443	33	38‍–‍29	20‍–‍44
Brooklyn Bridegrooms	58	73	.443	33	35‍–‍28	23‍–‍45
St. Louis Browns	40	90	.308	50½	27‍–‍34	13‍–‍56
Louisville Colonels	38	93	.290	53	25‍–‍37	13‍–‍56

=== Record vs. opponents ===
1896 National League record Sources:
Team	BAL	BSN	BRO	CHI	CIN	CLE	LOU	NYG	PHI	PIT	STL	WAS
Baltimore	—	5–7	6–6	7–4–2	10–2	3–8–1	10–2	9–3	12–0	9–2	9–3	10–2
Boston	7–5	—	10–2	3–9	5–6	5–7–1	8–4	7–5	7–5	7–5	8–4	7–5
Brooklyn	6–6	2–10	—	6–6	2–10	5–7	8–4	4–8	8–4	6–5–1	7–5	4–8–1
Chicago	4–7–2	9–3	6–6	—	4–6–1	2–9–1	9–3	5–7	4–8	11–1	9–3	8–4
Cincinnati	2–10	6–5	10–2	6–4–1	—	6–5	9–3	6–6	8–4	5–7	12–0	7–4
Cleveland	8–3–1	7–5–1	5–7	9–2–1	5–6	—	8–3–2	7–5	6–6	4–8–1	10–2	9–3–1
Louisville	2–10	4–8	4–8	3–9	3–9	3–8–2	—	4–8–1	7–5	2–10	3–9	3–9
New York	3–9	5–7	8–4	7–5	6–6	5–7	8–4–1	—	3–8	4–8	9–3–1	6–6
Philadelphia	0–12	5–7	4–8	8–4	4–8	6–6	5–7	8–3	—	6–6	8–3	8–4
Pittsburgh	2–9	5–7	5–6–1	1–11	7–5	8–4–1	10–2	8–4	6–6	—	8–3	6–6
St. Louis	3–9	4–8	5–7	3–9	0–12	2–10	9–3	3–9–1	3–8	3–8	—	5–7
Washington	2–10	5–7	8–4–1	4–8	4–7	3–9–1	9–3	6–6	4–8	6–6	5–7	—

=== Roster ===
1896 Cleveland Spiders
Roster
Pitchers: Ice Box Chamberlain; George Cuppy; Dale Gear; Zeke Wilson; Cy Young	Catchers: Lou Criger; Jack O'Connor; Tom O'Meara; Chief Zimmer; Infielders: Cupid Childs; Tom Delahanty; Chippy McGarr; Ed McKean; Patsy Tebeau	Outfielders: Henry Blake; Jesse Burkett; Jimmy McAleer; Sport McAllister; John Shearon; Bobby Wallace	Manager: Patsy Tebeau

== Player stats ==
=== Batting ===
==== Starters by position ====
Note: Pos = Position; G = Games played; AB = At bats; H = Hits; Avg. = Batting average; HR = Home runs; RBI = Runs batted in

Pos	Player	G	AB	H	Avg.	HR	RBI
C	Chief Zimmer	91	336	93	.277	3	46
1B	Patsy Tebeau	132	543	146	.269	2	94
2B	Cupid Childs	132	498	177	.355	1	106
SS	Ed McKean	133	571	193	.338	7	112
3B	Chippy McGarr	113	455	122	.268	1	53
OF	Jimmy McAleer	116	455	131	.288	1	54
OF	Jesse Burkett	133	586	240	.410	6	72
OF	Harry Blake	104	383	92	.240	1	43

==== Other batters ====
Note: G = Games played; AB = At bats; H = Hits; Avg. = Batting average; HR = Home runs; RBI = Runs batted in

Player	G	AB	H	Avg.	HR	RBI
Jack O'Connor	68	256	76	.297	1	43
Bobby Wallace	45	149	35	.235	1	17
John Shearon	16	64	11	.172	0	3
Tom Delahanty	16	56	13	.232	0	4
Tom O'Meara	12	33	5	.152	0	0
Sport McAllister	8	27	6	.222	0	1
Lou Criger	2	5	0	.000	0	0

=== Pitching ===
==== Starting pitchers ====
Note: G = Games pitched; IP = Innings pitched; W = Wins; L = Losses; ERA = Earned run average; SO = Strikeouts

Player	G	IP	W	L	ERA	SO
Cy Young	51	414.1	28	15	3.24	140
George Cuppy	46	358.0	25	14	3.12	86
Zeke Wilson	33	240.0	17	9	4.01	56
Bobby Wallace	22	145.1	10	7	3.34	46
Dale Gear	3	23.0	0	2	5.48	6
Ice Box Chamberlain	2	11.0	0	1	7.36	2

==== Relief pitchers ====
Note: G = Games pitched; W = Wins; L = Losses; SV = Saves; ERA = Earned run average; SO = Strikeouts

Player	G	W	L	SV	ERA	SO
Sport McAllister	1	0	0	0	6.75	0
Patsy Tebeau	1	0	0	0	----	0
