= 1896 Baltimore Orioles season =

1896 Baltimore Orioles
- National League champions Temple Cup champions
- League: National League
- Ballpark: Union Park
- City: Baltimore, Maryland
- Record: 90–39 (.698)
- League place: 1st
- Owners: Harry Von der Horst
- Managers: Ned Hanlon

The Baltimore Orioles won their third straight National League pennant in 1896. After the season, they faced the Cleveland Spiders in the Temple Cup for the second year in a row. After losing 4 games to 1 in 1895, the Orioles swept the Spiders in four straight. The Orioles had now played in the Cup in each of its first three seasons, with this one being their first win.

== Regular season ==
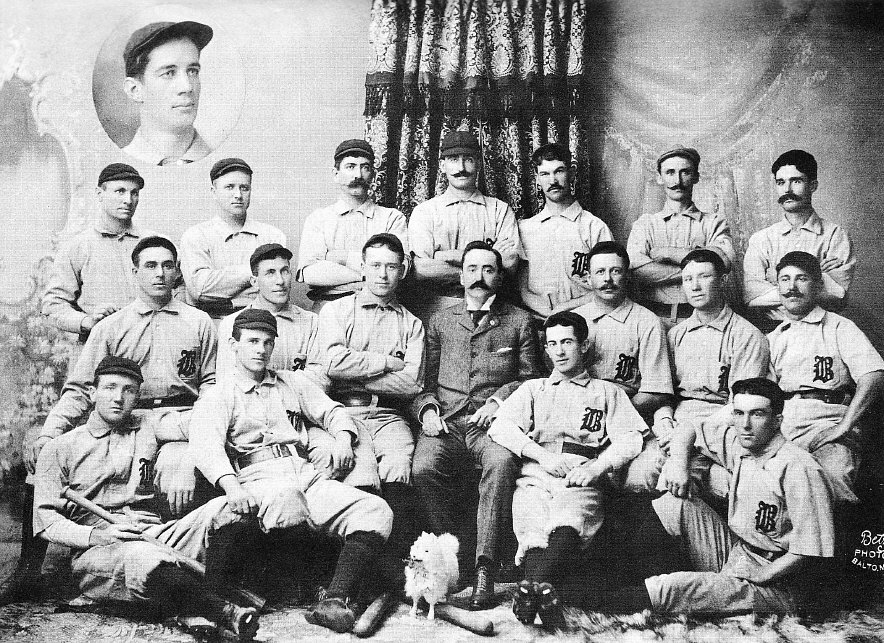
1896 Baltimore Orioles

=== Season standings ===
National League
Team	W	L	Pct.	GB	Home	Road
Baltimore Orioles	90	39	.698	—	49‍–‍16	41‍–‍23
Cleveland Spiders	80	48	.625	9½	43‍–‍19	37‍–‍29
Cincinnati Reds	77	50	.606	12	51‍–‍15	26‍–‍35
Boston Beaneaters	74	57	.565	17	42‍–‍24	32‍–‍33
Chicago Colts	71	57	.555	18½	42‍–‍24	29‍–‍33
Pittsburgh Pirates	66	63	.512	24	35‍–‍31	31‍–‍32
New York Giants	64	67	.489	27	39‍–‍26	25‍–‍41
Philadelphia Phillies	62	68	.477	28½	42‍–‍27	20‍–‍41
Washington Senators	58	73	.443	33	38‍–‍29	20‍–‍44
Brooklyn Bridegrooms	58	73	.443	33	35‍–‍28	23‍–‍45
St. Louis Browns	40	90	.308	50½	27‍–‍34	13‍–‍56
Louisville Colonels	38	93	.290	53	25‍–‍37	13‍–‍56

=== Record vs. opponents ===
1896 National League record Sources:
Team	BAL	BSN	BRO	CHI	CIN	CLE	LOU	NYG	PHI	PIT	STL	WAS
Baltimore	—	5–7	6–6	7–4–2	10–2	3–8–1	10–2	9–3	12–0	9–2	9–3	10–2
Boston	7–5	—	10–2	3–9	5–6	5–7–1	8–4	7–5	7–5	7–5	8–4	7–5
Brooklyn	6–6	2–10	—	6–6	2–10	5–7	8–4	4–8	8–4	6–5–1	7–5	4–8–1
Chicago	4–7–2	9–3	6–6	—	4–6–1	2–9–1	9–3	5–7	4–8	11–1	9–3	8–4
Cincinnati	2–10	6–5	10–2	6–4–1	—	6–5	9–3	6–6	8–4	5–7	12–0	7–4
Cleveland	8–3–1	7–5–1	5–7	9–2–1	5–6	—	8–3–2	7–5	6–6	4–8–1	10–2	9–3–1
Louisville	2–10	4–8	4–8	3–9	3–9	3–8–2	—	4–8–1	7–5	2–10	3–9	3–9
New York	3–9	5–7	8–4	7–5	6–6	5–7	8–4–1	—	3–8	4–8	9–3–1	6–6
Philadelphia	0–12	5–7	4–8	8–4	4–8	6–6	5–7	8–3	—	6–6	8–3	8–4
Pittsburgh	2–9	5–7	5–6–1	1–11	7–5	8–4–1	10–2	8–4	6–6	—	8–3	6–6
St. Louis	3–9	4–8	5–7	3–9	0–12	2–10	9–3	3–9–1	3–8	3–8	—	5–7
Washington	2–10	5–7	8–4–1	4–8	4–7	3–9–1	9–3	6–6	4–8	6–6	5–7	—

=== Roster ===
1896 Baltimore Orioles
Roster
Pitchers: Dad Clarkson; Joe Corbett; Duke Esper; George Hemming; Bill Hoffer; Sadie McMahon; Jerry Nops; Arlie Pond; Otis Stocksdale	Catchers: Frank Bowerman; Boileryard Clarke; Wilbert Robinson; Infielders: Jim Donnelly; Jack Doyle; Hughie Jennings; Bill Keister; John McGraw; Joe Quinn; Heinie Reitz	Outfielders: Steve Brodie; Willie Keeler; Joe Kelley	Manager: Ned Hanlon

== Player stats ==
=== Batting ===
==== Starters by position ====
Note: Pos = Position; G = Games played; AB = At bats; H = Hits; Avg. = Batting average; HR = Home runs; RBI = Runs batted in

Pos	Player	G	AB	H	Avg.	HR	RBI
C	Wilbert Robinson	67	245	85	.347	2	38
1B	Jack Doyle	118	487	165	.339	1	101
2B	Heinie Reitz	120	464	133	.287	4	106
SS	Hughie Jennings	130	521	209	.401	0	121
3B	Jim Donnelly	106	396	130	.328	0	71
OF	Willie Keeler	126	544	210	.386	4	82
OF	Steve Brodie	132	516	153	.297	2	87
OF	Joe Kelley	131	519	189	.364	8	100

==== Other batters ====
Note: G = Games played; AB = At bats; H = Hits; Avg. = Batting average; HR = Home runs; RBI = Runs batted in

Player	G	AB	H	Avg.	HR	RBI
Boileryard Clarke	80	300	89	.297	2	71
Joe Quinn	24	82	27	.329	0	5
John McGraw	23	77	25	.325	0	14
Bill Keister	15	58	14	.241	0	5
Frank Bowerman	4	16	2	.125	0	4

=== Pitching ===
==== Starting pitchers ====
Note: G = Games pitched; IP = Innings pitched; W = Wins; L = Losses; ERA = Earned run average; SO = Strikeouts

Player	G	IP	W	L	ERA	SO
Bill Hoffer	35	309.0	25	7	3.38	93
Arlie Pond	28	214.1	16	8	3.49	80
George Hemming	25	202.0	15	6	4.19	33
Sadie McMahon	22	175.2	11	9	3.48	33
Duke Esper	20	155.2	14	5	3.58	19
Jerry Nops	3	22.0	2	1	6.14	8

==== Other pitchers ====
Note: G = Games pitched; IP = Innings pitched; W = Wins; L = Losses; ERA = Earned run average; SO = Strikeouts

Player	G	IP	W	L	ERA	SO
Dad Clarkson	7	47.0	4	2	4.98	7
Joe Corbett	8	41.0	3	0	2.20	28

==== Relief pitchers ====
Note: G = Games pitched; W = Wins; L = Losses; SV = Saves; ERA = Earned run average; SO = Strikeouts

Player	G	W	L	SV	ERA	SO
Otis Stocksdale	1	0	1	0	16.20	1
