= Joe Wright (baseball) =

American baseball player (1869–1909)

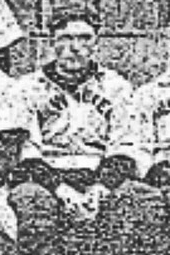
- Center fielder
- Born: 1869; Oshkosh, Wisconsin, U.S.
- Died: September 20, 1909 (aged 39 or 40); Omaha, Nebraska, U.S.
- Batted: Left Threw: Left

MLB debut
- July 14, 1895, for the Louisville Colonels

Last MLB appearance
- September 18, 1896, for the Pittsburgh Pirates

MLB statistics
- Batting average: .282
- Home runs: 1
- Runs batted in: 36
- Stats at Baseball Reference

Teams
- Louisville Colonels (1895–96); Pittsburgh Pirates (1896)

Joel Sherman Wright (1869 – September 20, 1909) was an American professional baseball player. He played parts of two seasons in Major League Baseball for the Louisville Colonels and Pittsburgh Pirates in 1895–96, primarily as an outfielder.

Wright started his professional baseball career in 1890 with the Ottawa team in the Illinois–Iowa League. He broke into the majors in 1895 with the Colonels, where he played the second-most games in the outfield on the team. The next season, he was traded to the Pirates in May.

Wright returned to play in the minor leagues from 1897 to 1900. He died in 1909.
