= 1895 Cincinnati Reds season =

1895 Cincinnati Reds
- League: National League
- Ballpark: League Park
- City: Cincinnati
- Record: 66–64 (.508)
- League place: 7th
- Owners: John T. Brush
- Managers: Buck Ewing

The 1895 Cincinnati Reds season was a season in American baseball. The Reds finished in eighth place in the National League with 66 wins and 64 losses, 21 games behind the Baltimore Orioles.

== Regular season ==
After finishing the 1894 season with a record of only 55–75, the Reds replaced Charles Comiskey as player-manager with first baseman Buck Ewing. Ewing was previously a player-manager with the New York Giants of the Players' League in 1890, leading them to a 74–57 record and a third-place finish. He spent the last two seasons playing with the Cleveland Spiders, and in 1893 with Cleveland, Ewing hit .344 with six home runs and 122 RBI before missing much of the 1894 season with injuries. He also once led the National League in home runs with ten in 1883 while playing for the New York Giants, and in triples with twenty with the Giants in 1884.

The Reds would suffer a big blow, as outfielder Bug Holliday would have an appendectomy and would miss most of the season recovering. Cincinnati signed outfielder Dusty Miller, who last played in the majors with the St. Louis Browns in 1890. The Reds also acquired Billy Rhines, who previously pitched with the team from 1890–1892 before playing with the Louisville Colonels in 1893. Rhines missed the entire 1894 season due to injuries, and had not pitched a full season since 1891 when he went 17–24 with a 2.87 ERA with Cincinnati.

During the season, the Reds acquired outfielder Eddie Burke from the New York Giants.

Cincinnati got off to a hot start, as they had a league-best 18–8 record after twenty-six games. The Reds though went 3–12 in their next fifteen games to fall into seventh place, five games behind the Pittsburgh Pirates. Cincinnati got back into the pennant race after posting a 19–9 clip in their next twenty-eight games, pushing their record to 40–29, sitting in third place, one game behind the Pirates and Cleveland Spiders. The team went on a 5–9 slide in their next fourteen games to fall into sixth place, 5.5 games out of first, before reeling off five wins in a row, but they only moved up to fifth and were still five games behind the first place Spiders. After winning two of their next three games to move into fourth place with a 52–39 record, Cincinnati would win only fourteen of their last thirty-nine games to drop out of the pennant race and finish with a 66–64 record, which put them in eighth place, 20.5 games behind the pennant winning Baltimore Orioles.

Dusty Miller had a spectacular season with the Reds, as he hit a team high .335 with ten homers and 112 RBI, as well as swiping 43 bases in 132 games. Player-manager Buck Ewing hit .318 with five home runs and 94 RBI, while Bid McPhee batted .299 with a homer, 75 RBI and a team high 107 runs scored. Dummy Hoy led the Reds with 50 stolen bases, while hitting .277 with three home runs and 55 RBI.

On the mound, Billy Rhines had a very solid comeback season, leading Cincinnati with a 19–10 record in 38 games pitched, 33 starts and 25 complete games. Frank Dwyer had an 18–15 record with a team-best 4.24 ERA in 37 games.

=== Season standings ===
National League
Team	W	L	Pct.	GB	Home	Road
Baltimore Orioles	87	43	.669	—	54‍–‍12	33‍–‍31
Cleveland Spiders	84	46	.646	3	49‍–‍13	35‍–‍33
Philadelphia Phillies	78	53	.595	9½	51‍–‍21	27‍–‍32
Chicago Colts	72	58	.554	15	43‍–‍24	29‍–‍34
Brooklyn Grooms	71	60	.542	16½	43‍–‍22	28‍–‍38
Boston Beaneaters	71	60	.542	16½	48‍–‍19	23‍–‍41
Pittsburgh Pirates	71	61	.538	17	44‍–‍21	27‍–‍40
Cincinnati Reds	66	64	.508	21	42‍–‍22	24‍–‍42
New York Giants	66	65	.504	21½	40‍–‍27	26‍–‍38
Washington Senators	43	85	.336	43	31‍–‍34	12‍–‍51
St. Louis Browns	39	92	.298	48½	25‍–‍41	14‍–‍51
Louisville Colonels	35	96	.267	52½	19‍–‍38	16‍–‍58

=== Record vs. opponents ===
1895 National League record Sources:
Team	BAL	BSN	BRO	CHI	CIN	CLE	LOU	NYG	PHI	PIT	STL	WAS
Baltimore	—	10–2	7–5	8–4	8–4	5–6	10–1	9–3	8–4–1	7–5–1	6–6	9–3
Boston	2–10	—	4–7	7–5	5–7	6–6	9–3–1	8–4	5–7	7–5	9–3	9–3–1
Brooklyn	5–7	7–4	—	6–6	5–7	2–10	11–1	9–3–1	5–7–1	7–5–1	9–3	5–7
Chicago	4–8	5–7	6–6	—	5–7	6–5	9–3–1	4–8	6–6	8–4	10–2	9–2–2
Cincinnati	4–8	7–5	7–5	7–5	—	6–6	6–6	4–8	4–8	4–8–1	9–3–1	8–2
Cleveland	6–5	6–6	10–2	5–6	6–6	—	10–2	7–5	7–5	7–5	11–1–2	9–3
Louisville	1–10	3–9–1	1–11	3–9–1	6–6	2–10	—	3–9	2–10	2–10	6–6	6–6
New York	3–9	4–8	3–9–1	8–4	8–4	5–7	9–3	—	3–8	4–8	11–1	8–4
Philadelphia	4–8–1	7–5	7–5–1	6–6	8–4	5–7	10–2	8–3	—	8–4	7–5	8–4
Pittsburgh	5–7–1	5–7	5–7–1	4–8	8–4–1	5–7	10–2	8–4	4–8	—	9–3	8–4
St. Louis	6–6	3–9	3–9	2–10	3–9–1	1–11–2	6–6	1–11	5–7	3–9	—	6–5–2
Washington	3–9	3–9–1	7–5	2–9–2	2–8	3–9	6–6	4–8	4–8	4–8	5–6–2	—

=== Game log ===
Legend
Reds Win	Reds Loss	Game Tied/Postponed

1895 Game Log: 66–64 (Home: 42–22; Away: 24–42)
April: 5–4 (Home: 5–4; Away: 0–0)

#	Date	Opponent	Score	Stadium	Attendance	Record	Streak
1	April 18	Spiders	10–8	League Park	13,000	1-0	W1
2	April 20	Spiders	14–8	League Park	6,317	2-0	W2
3	April 21	Spiders	12–3	League Park	17,000	3-0	W3
4	April 23	Pirates	3–6	League Park	5,396	3-1	L1
5	April 24	Pirates	5–8	League Park	2,397	3-2	L2
6	April 25	Pirates	4–7	League Park	1,961	3-3	L3
7	April 27	Colts	5–6	League Park	3,175	3-4	L4
8	April 28	Colts	10–6	League Park	8,628	4-4	W1
9	April 29	Colts	3–0	League Park	2,423	5-4	W2

May: 15–9 (Home: 14–4; Away: 1–5)

#	Date	Opponent	Score	Stadium	Attendance	Record	Streak
10	May 1	@ Pirates	1–4	Exposition Park	8,000	5-5	L1
11	May 2	@ Pirates	9–8	Exposition Park	2,800	6-5	W1
12	May 4	@ Pirates	2–3	Exposition Park	5,000	6-6	L1
13	May 5	Browns	4–11	League Park	7,428	6-7	L2
14	May 6	Giants	4–3	League Park	2,663	7-7	W1
15	May 7	Giants	7–6	League Park	3,735	8-7	W2
16	May 8	Giants	3–10	League Park	3,715	8-8	L1
17	May 9	Grooms	14–8	League Park	2,419	9-8	W1
-	May 10	Grooms	Postponed (rain); Makeup: July 9				
18	May 11	Grooms	11–1	League Park	1,494	10-8	W2
19	May 12	Orioles	8–6	League Park	10,703	11-8	W3
-	May 13	Orioles	Postponed (rain); Makeup: July 19				
20	May 14	Orioles	5–2	League Park	1,314	12-8	W4
21	May 16	Senators	9–6	League Park	2,133	13-8	W5
22	May 17	Senators	15–6	League Park	2,652	14-8	W6
23	May 18	Senators	9–4	League Park	5,041	15-8	W7
24	May 19	Senators	4–3	League Park	11,685	16-8	W8
-	May 20	Beaneaters	Postponed (wet grounds); Makeup: July 17				
25	May 21	Beaneaters	10–7	League Park	5,681	17-8	W9
26	May 22	Beaneaters	21–8	League Park	5,127	18-8	W10
27	May 23	Phillies	8–13	League Park	5,386	18-9	L1
28	May 24	Phillies	13–14	League Park	3,284	18-10	L2
29	May 25	Phillies	8–4	League Park	4,244	19-10	W1
30	May 26	Spiders	7–4	League Park	8,216	20-10	W2
31	May 28	@ Phillies	2–8	Philadelphia Baseball Grounds	9,250	20-11	L1
32	May 30 1	@ Phillies	1–9	Philadelphia Baseball Grounds	8,680	20-12	L2
33	May 30 2	@ Phillies	8–9	Philadelphia Baseball Grounds	18,000	20-13	L3

June: 9–11 (Home: 4–1; Away: 5–10)

#	Date	Opponent	Score	Stadium	Attendance	Record	Streak
34	June 1	@ Beaneaters	5–9	South End Grounds	8,000	20-14	L4
-	June 3	@ Beaneaters	Postponed (wet grounds); Makeup: September 3				
35	June 4	@ Beaneaters	5–12	South End Grounds	1,500	20-15	L5
36	June 5	@ Grooms	6–4	Eastern Park	2,000	21-15	W1
37	June 6	@ Giants	0–2	Polo Grounds	3,000	21-16	L1
38	June 7	@ Grooms	9–10	Eastern Park	2,500	21-17	L2
39	June 8	@ Orioles	1–7	Union Park	4,300	21-18	L3
40	June 10	@ Orioles	4–13	Union Park	3,100	21-19	L4
41	June 11	@ Orioles	4–6	Union Park	2,000	21-20	L5
-	June 12	@ Senators	Postponed (wet grounds); Makeup: September 5				
42	June 14	@ Senators	6–3	Boundary Field	5,000	22-20	W1
43	June 15	@ Giants	16–2	Polo Grounds	7,500	23-20	W2
44	June 17	@ Grooms	2–4	Eastern Park	3,000	23-21	L1
45	June 18	@ Giants	3–10	Polo Grounds	2,250	23-22	L2
46	June 21	@ Browns	7–5	New Sportsman's Park	2,500	24-22	W1
47	June 22	@ Browns	8–6	New Sportsman's Park	4,000	25-22	W2
48	June 23	@ Browns	3–9	New Sportsman's Park	8,000	25-23	L1
-	June 24	Browns	Postponed (schedule change); Makeup: June 26				
49	June 25	Browns	10–6	League Park	2,304	26-23	W1
50	June 26	Browns	12–5	League Park	2,684	27-23	W2
51	June 27	Colonels	4–3	League Park	1,430	28-23	W3
52	June 29	Colonels	9–8	League Park	2,932	29-23	W4
53	June 30	Colonels	1–4	League Park	5,584	29-24	L1

July: 16–11 (Home: 13–8; Away: 3–3)

#	Date	Opponent	Score	Stadium	Attendance	Record	Streak
54	July 1	@ Colonels	11–5	Eclipse Park	1,006	30-24	W1
55	July 2	@ Colonels	6–5	Eclipse Park	824	31-24	W2
56	July 3	@ Colonels	15–6	Eclipse Park	790	32-24	W3
57	July 4 1	@ Colts	7–8	West Side Park	13,020	32-25	L1
58	July 4 2	@ Colts	5–9	West Side Park	22,913	32-26	L2
59	July 5	@ Colts	14–5	West Side Park	3,000	33-26	W1
60	July 6	Grooms	16–15	League Park	3,800	34-26	W2
-	July 7	Grooms	Postponed (rain); Makeup: July 9				
61	July 8	Grooms	7–11	League Park	2,336	34-27	L1
62	July 9 1	Grooms	6–5	League Park	N/A	35-27	W1
63	July 9 2	Grooms	14–6	League Park	4,500	36-27	W2
-	July 10	Senators	Postponed (schedule change); Makeup: May 17				
64	July 13	Senators	5–3	League Park	4,333	37-27	W3
65	July 14	Senators	3–6	League Park	10,278	37-28	L1
66	July 15	Beaneaters	9–12	League Park	2,346	37-29	L2
67	July 16	Beaneaters	9–2	League Park	2,880	38-29	W1
68	July 17 1	Beaneaters	12–1	League Park	N/A	39-29	W2
69	July 17 2	Beaneaters	6–1	League Park	6,836	40-29	W3
70	July 18	Orioles	2–10	League Park	2,703	40-30	L1
71	July 19	Orioles	1–2	League Park	2,184	40-31	L2
72	July 20	Orioles	11–5	League Park	4,328	41-31	W1
73	July 21	Orioles	6–10	League Park	11,648	41-32	L1
74	July 22	Giants	12–9	League Park	1,704	42-32	W1
75	July 23	Giants	3–7	League Park	3,248	42-33	L1
76	July 24	Giants	7–9	League Park	1,420	42-34	L2
77	July 25	Phillies	19–3	League Park	2,156	43-34	W1
78	July 26	Phillies	5–6	League Park	2,754	43-35	L1
79	July 27	Phillies	12–4	League Park	3,944	44-35	W1
80	July 28	Spiders	13–9	League Park	13,072	45-35	W2

August: 9–15 (Home: 6–3; Away: 3–12)

#	Date	Opponent	Score	Stadium	Attendance	Record	Streak
-	August 1	@ Colonels	Postponed (unknown reason); Makeup: August 2				
81	August 2	@ Colonels	8–9	Eclipse Park	1,500	45-36	L1
82	August 3	@ Colonels	0–7	Eclipse Park	2,610	45-37	L2
83	August 4	Colonels	3–4	League Park	6,000	45-38	L3
-	August 5	@ Colts	Postponed (schedule change); Makeup: September 27				
-	August 6	@ Colts	Postponed (site change); Makeup: August 6				
84	August 6	Colts	8–6	League Park	2,456	46-38	W1
-	August 7	@ Colts	Postponed (site change); Makeup: August 7				
85	August 7	Colts	6–5	League Park	2,404	47-38	W2
86	August 8	Browns	10–2	League Park	2,234	48-38	W3
87	August 10	Browns	3–2	League Park	2,500	49-38	W4
88	August 11	Browns	7–7	League Park	6,598	49-38	W4
89	August 12	Pirates	10–4	League Park	3,004	50-38	W5
90	August 13	Pirates	11–12	League Park	5,033	50-39	L1
91	August 14	Pirates	2–1	League Park	3,348	51-39	W1
92	August 15	@ Spiders	4–3	League Park	3,600	52-39	W2
93	August 16	@ Spiders	2–5	League Park	3,600	52-40	L1
94	August 17	@ Spiders	0–6	League Park	4,400	52-41	L2
95	August 18	Spiders	3–15	League Park	10,000	52-42	L3
96	August 20	@ Phillies	9–8	Philadelphia Baseball Grounds	5,050	53-42	W1
97	August 21	@ Phillies	1–5	Philadelphia Baseball Grounds	5,432	53-43	L1
98	August 22	@ Phillies	3–4	Philadelphia Baseball Grounds	5,790	53-44	L2
99	August 24	@ Orioles	5–22	Union Park	5,300	53-45	L3
100	August 26	@ Orioles	12–9	Union Park	3,000	54-45	W1
101	August 27	@ Orioles	0–10	Union Park	2,100	54-46	L1
102	August 28	@ Giants	1–8	Polo Grounds	800	54-47	L2
103	August 29	@ Grooms	6–11	Eastern Park	1,500	54-48	L3
104	August 30	@ Giants	4–11	Polo Grounds	2,500	54-49	L4
105	August 31	@ Beaneaters	6–12	South End Grounds	5,000	54-50	L5

September: 12–14 (Home: 1–1; Away: 11–13)

#	Date	Opponent	Score	Stadium	Attendance	Record	Streak
106	September 2 1	@ Beaneaters	4–3	South End Grounds	3,000	55-50	W1
107	September 2 2	@ Beaneaters	3–7	South End Grounds	8,000	55-51	L1
108	September 3	@ Beaneaters	16–7	South End Grounds	2,500	56-51	W1
109	September 4	@ Senators	11–5	Boundary Field	910	57-51	W2
110	September 5 1	@ Senators	4–11	Boundary Field	N/A	57-52	L1
111	September 5 2	@ Senators	12–6	Boundary Field	1,128	58-52	W1
112	September 7	@ Grooms	8–7	Eastern Park	3,500	59-52	W2
113	September 9	@ Giants	1–4	Polo Grounds	2,000	59-53	L1
114	September 10	@ Grooms	1–2	Eastern Park	1,700	59-54	L2
115	September 11	@ Pirates	2–6	Exposition Park	1,100	59-55	L3
116	September 12	@ Pirates	3–3	Exposition Park	1,800	59-55	L3
117	September 13	@ Pirates	3–4	Exposition Park	1,200	59-56	L4
118	September 14	@ Pirates	7–0	Exposition Park	2,500	60-56	W1
119	September 16	@ Spiders	0–7	League Park	3,500	60-57	L1
120	September 17	@ Spiders	0–7	League Park	2,500	60-58	L2
121	September 18	@ Spiders	9–10	League Park	2,000	60-59	L3
-	September 19	Colonels	Postponed (unknown reason); Makeup: September 20				
122	September 20	Colonels	6–9	League Park	1,247	60-60	L4
123	September 21	Colonels	19–8	League Park	1,300	61-60	W1
124	September 22	@ Colonels	1–5	Eclipse Park	2,500	61-61	L1
125	September 23	@ Browns	15–6	New Sportsman's Park	500	62-61	W1
126	September 24	@ Browns	11–1	New Sportsman's Park	100	63-61	W2
127	September 25 1	@ Browns	15–8	New Sportsman's Park	N/A	64-61	W3
128	September 25 2	@ Browns	4–5	New Sportsman's Park	200	64-62	L1
-	September 26	Colts	Postponed (site change); Makeup: September 26				
129	September 26	@ Colts	12–1	West Side Park	1,500	65-62	W1
130	September 27	@ Colts	6–11	West Side Park	600	65-63	L1
-	September 28	Colts	Postponed (site change); Makeup: September 28				
131	September 28	@ Colts	5–4	West Side Park	400	66-63	W1
-	September 29	Colts	Postponed (site change); Makeup: September 29				
132	September 29	@ Colts	1–9	West Side Park	2,000	66-64	L1

=== Roster ===
1895 Cincinnati Reds
Roster
Pitchers: King Bailey; Frank Dwyer; Frank Foreman; Tom Parrott; Bill Phillips; Billy Rhines	Catchers: Mike Kahoe; Bill Merritt; Morgan Murphy; Harry Spies; Farmer Vaughn; Infielders: Buck Ewing; Bill Gray; Arlie Latham; Bid McPhee; Germany Smith	Outfielders: Eddie Burke; George Hogreiver; Bug Holliday; Dummy Hoy; Dusty Miller	Manager: Buck Ewing

== Player stats ==
=== Batting ===
==== Starters by position ====
Note: Pos = Position; G = Games played; AB = At bats; H = Hits; Avg. = Batting average; HR = Home runs; RBI = Runs batted in

Pos	Player	G	AB	H	Avg.	HR	RBI
C	Farmer Vaughn	92	334	102	.305	1	48
1B	Buck Ewing	105	434	138	.318	5	94
2B	Bid McPhee	115	432	129	.299	1	75
SS	Germany Smith	127	503	151	.300	4	74
3B	Arlie Latham	112	460	143	.311	2	69
OF	Dusty Miller	132	529	177	.335	10	112
OF	Dummy Hoy	107	429	119	.277	3	55
OF	George Hogreiver	69	239	65	.272	2	34

==== Other batters ====
Note: G = Games played; AB = At bats; H = Hits; Avg. = Batting average; HR = Home runs; RBI = Runs batted in

Player	G	AB	H	Avg.	HR	RBI
Eddie Burke	56	228	61	.268	1	25
Bill Gray	52	181	55	.304	1	29
Bug Holliday	32	127	38	.299	0	20
Morgan Murphy	25	82	22	.268	0	16
Bill Merritt	22	79	14	.177	0	12
Harry Spies	14	50	11	.220	0	5
Mike Kahoe	3	4	0	.000	0	0

=== Pitching ===
==== Starting pitchers ====
Note: G = Games pitched; IP = Innings pitched; W = Wins; L = Losses; ERA = Earned run average; SO = Strikeouts

Player	G	IP	W	L	ERA	SO
Frank Dwyer	37	280.1	18	15	4.24	46
Billy Rhines	38	267.2	19	10	4.81	72
Tom Parrott	41	263.1	11	18	5.47	57
Frank Foreman	32	219.0	11	14	4.11	55
King Bailey	1	8.0	1	0	5.63	0

==== Other pitchers ====
Note: G = Games pitched; IP = Innings pitched; W = Wins; L = Losses; ERA = Earned run average; SO = Strikeouts

Player	G	IP	W	L	ERA	SO
Bill Phillips	18	109.0	6	7	6.03	15
