= 1895 in baseball =

The following are the baseball events of the year 1895 throughout the world.

== Champions ==
- Temple Cup: Cleveland Spiders over Baltimore Orioles (4–1)
- National League: Baltimore Orioles

== Statistical leaders ==
National League
Stat	Player	Total
AVG	Jesse Burkett (CLE)	.405
HR	Sam Thompson (PHI)	18
RBI	Sam Thompson (PHI)	165
W	Cy Young (CLE)	35
ERA	Al Maul (WAS)	2.45
K	Amos Rusie (NYG)	201

== National League final standings ==
National League
Team	W	L	Pct.	GB	Home	Road
Baltimore Orioles	87	43	.669	—	54‍–‍12	33‍–‍31
Cleveland Spiders	84	46	.646	3	49‍–‍13	35‍–‍33
Philadelphia Phillies	78	53	.595	9½	51‍–‍21	27‍–‍32
Chicago Colts	72	58	.554	15	43‍–‍24	29‍–‍34
Brooklyn Grooms	71	60	.542	16½	43‍–‍22	28‍–‍38
Boston Beaneaters	71	60	.542	16½	48‍–‍19	23‍–‍41
Pittsburgh Pirates	71	61	.538	17	44‍–‍21	27‍–‍40
Cincinnati Reds	66	64	.508	21	42‍–‍22	24‍–‍42
New York Giants	66	65	.504	21½	40‍–‍27	26‍–‍38
Washington Senators	43	85	.336	43	31‍–‍34	12‍–‍51
St. Louis Browns	39	92	.298	48½	25‍–‍41	14‍–‍51
Louisville Colonels	35	96	.267	52½	19‍–‍38	16‍–‍58

Locations of teams for the 1893–1895 National League seasons
National League

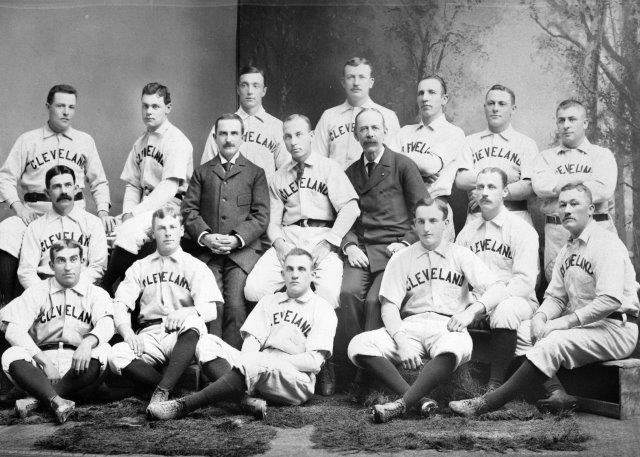
1895 Cleveland Spiders

== Notable seasons ==
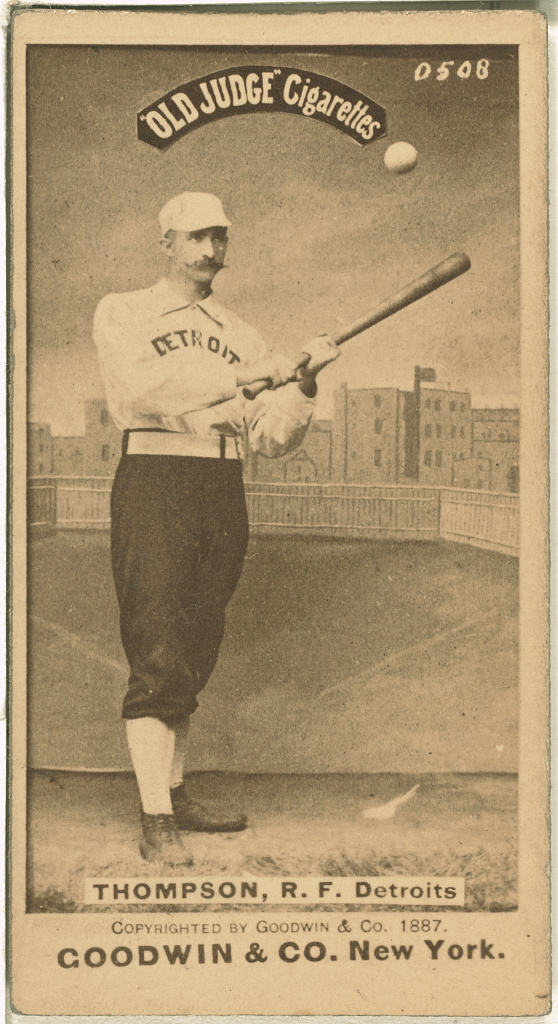
Sam Thompson

- Philadelphia Phillies right fielder Sam Thompson led the NL in home runs (18), total bases (352), slugging percentage (.654), and runs batted in (165). He was second in the NL in adjusted OPS+ (176). He was third in the NL in hits (211). He was fourth in the NL in batting average (.392).
- Pittsburgh Pirates pitcher Pink Hawley had a win–loss record of 31–22 and led the NL in innings pitched (444.1) and shutouts (4). He was second in the NL in wins (31) and earned run average (3.18). He was third in the NL in strikeouts (142). He was fifth in the NL in adjusted ERA+ (143).

== Events ==
- February 27 – Responding to the complaints of senior citizens like Cap Anson, the National League restricts the size of gloves for all fielders, save catchers and first basemen, to 10 ounces, with a maximum circumference of 14 inches around the palm (less than 4½ inches across). The league also rescinds the rule forbidding intentional discoloring of the ball, thus allowing players to dirty the baseball to their satisfaction.
- August 16 – Tommy Dowd of the St. Louis Browns hits for the cycle in an 8–5 win over the Louisville Colonels.
- September 30 – Washington Senators first baseman Ed Cartwright hits for the cycle against the Boston Beaneaters.

== Births ==
=== January ===
- January 6 – Charlie Blackburn
- January 9 – Ray French
- January 11 – Paddy Driscoll
- January 12
  - Henry Bostick
  - Jack Knight
- January 16 – Lou Guisto
- January 18 – George Hesselbacher
- January 19 – Dan Boone
- January 21
  - Ed Sperber
  - Jimmy Zinn
- January 24 – Joe Cobb

=== February ===
- February 2
  - George Halas
  - George Lees
  - Burlin White
- February 6 – Babe Ruth
- February 9 – Wally Hood
- February 12 – Sweetbread Bailey
- February 15
  - Larry Goetz
  - Jimmy Ring
- February 16 – Red Cox
- February 17 – Leon Carlson
- February 22
  - Tony DeFate
  - Roy Graham
  - Ed Monroe
- February 23 – Gus Sandberg
- February 24 – Bill Bagwell

=== March ===
- March 3 – Joe Jaeger
- March 4 – Jesse Baker
- March 8 – Jack Bentley
- March 9 – Frank Kane
- March 10 – Jake Propst
- March 13
  - Eric Erickson
  - Alejandro Oms
- March 17 – Lyman Lamb
- March 23 – Frank Parkinson
- March 26 – Joe Klugmann
- March 27 – Bill Burwell
- March 31 – Carson Bigbee

=== April ===
- April 2 – Earl Pruess
- April 8 – Eddie Bacon
- April 10 – Bob McGraw
- April 11 – Ralph Sharman
- April 12 – Sammy Vick
- April 18 – Hans Rasmussen
- April 22 – Bob Smith
- April 23 – Tom Knowlson
- April 24
  - Harry Harper
  - Dixie Parker
- April 25 – George Lowe
- April 26 – Buzz Murphy
- April 29 – Verne Blackbourn

=== May ===
- May 3
  - Bob Pepper
  - Chick Tolson
- May 4 – Charlie Babington
- May 8 – Ed Murray
- May 10 – Pat Hardgrove
- May 12 – Jim Poole
- May 13
  - Red Lanning
  - Frank Mills
- May 15
  - Joe Evans
  - Jimmy Smith
- May 16 – Colonel Snover
- May 19 – Ray Kennedy
- May 24 – Gus Felix
- May 25 – Jim Riley
- May 30 – Harry Salmon

=== June ===
- June 2 – Al Baird
- June 3 – Johnny Bassler
- June 5 – Ray Rohwer
- June 8 – Sam McConnell
- June 13 – Emilio Palmero
- June 14 – Ike Davis
- June 21 – Oliver Marcelle
- June 23
  - Jack Smith
  - George Weiss
- June 25 – Bill Webb
- June 30 – Johnny Miljus

=== July ===
- July 2 – Frank Thompson
- July 5 – George Kopshaw
- July 9 – Joe Gleason
- July 12 – Artie Dede
- July 19 – Snake Henry
- July 23 – Art Rico
- July 29 – Dutch Stryker

=== August ===
- August 1 – Clem Llewellyn
- August 4 – Hooks Foreman
- August 7 – Ed Gill
- August 9 – Willis Flournoy
- August 10 – Joe Schepner
- August 16 – Fred Bailey
- August 20 – Pete Schneider
- August 24 – Les Howe
- August 25 – Ray Roberts
- August 26 – Axel Lindstrom
- August 29 – Guy Morrison

=== September ===
- September 5 – Ted Jourdan
- September 6 – Shags Horan
- September 10 – George Kelly
- September 15 – Hugh McQuillan
- September 21 – Ad Swigler
- September 22 – Austin McHenry
- September 23 – Johnny Mokan
- September 26 – Bernie Neis
- September 28
  - Hal Bubser
  - Whitey Witt
- September 30 – Dick Cox

=== October ===
- October 1
  - Carmen Hill
  - Roy Johnson
- October 3 – Bert Lewis
- October 4 – Ralph Shinners
- October 5 – Norm McMillan
- October 7 – Fred Fussell
- October 8 – Ed Wingo
- October 13
  - Mike Gazella
  - Ben Paschal
  - Jim Roberts
- October 16 – Bill Skiff
- October 18
  - Babe Pinelli
  - Tom Sullivan
- October 20 – John Russell
- October 22 – Johnny Morrison
- October 24 – Al Pierotti
- October 27 – Clarence Huber
- October 30 – Thomas Healy

=== November ===
- November 3
  - Felton Stratton
  - Jim Walkup
  - Kid Willson
- November 4 – Bill McCarren
- November 5
  - Tom McNamara
  - Rasty Wright
- November 8 – Mike Knode
- November 10
  - Chick Fewster
  - Slicker Parks
  - Bill Summers
- November 11 – Cy Morgan
- November 13 – George Dumont
- November 17 – George Scott
- November 19 – Billy Zitzmann
- November 23 – Dallas Bradshaw
- November 25 – Jakie May
- November 26 – George Tomer
- November 28
  - Bill Anderson
  - Molly Craft
- November 29 – Jack Enright

=== December ===
- December 1 – Jake Miller
- December 2 – Art Jahn
- December 7 – Bud Davis
- December 25
  - Frank Ellerbe
  - Herb Hunter
- December 26
  - Bonnie Hollingsworth
  - Herman Pillette
- December 29 – Clyde Barnhart

== Deaths ==
- January 10 – Steve Ladew, 32, outfielder/pitcher for the Kansas City Cowboys of the American Association.
- January 15 – Ed Silch, 29, pitcher for the 1888 Brooklyn Bridegrooms of the National League.
- January 21 – Frank Bowes, 30, backup catcher/outfielder/infielder for the 1890 Brooklyn Gladiators of the American Association.
- January 29 – Tony Suck, 36, catcher who played with the Buffalo Bisons of the National League (1883) and for the Baltimore Monumentals and Chicago Browns of the Union Association (1884).
- February 8 – Roger Carey, 30, second baseman for the 1889 New York Giants of the National League.
- March 2 – Kid Camp, 25, National League pitcher who played for the 1892 Pittsburgh Pirates and the 1894 Chicago Colts.
- March 30 – Henry Easterday, 30, shortstop who played for five teams of two different leagues between the 1884 and 1890 seasons.
- April 16 – Jack McQuaid, 36, American Association and National League umpire from 1886 to 1894.
- April 18 – Henry Myers, 36, shortstop and manager for the 1882 Baltimore Orioles, who also played part of two seasons with the Providence Grays and the Wilmington Quicksteps.
- April 21 – Jim Tipper, 45, National Association outfielder who played for the Middletown Mansfields, Hartford Dark Blues, and New Haven Elm Citys teams between the 1869 and 1875 seasons.
- April 23 – Long John Ewing, 31, pitcher/outfielder for six teams in four different leagues between 1883 and 1891, who led all National League pitchers with a 2.27 earned run average in his last major league season.
- June 21 – Rex Smith, 31, pitcher for the 1886 Philadelphia Athletics of the American Association.
- July 8 – Steve King, 53, outfielder who played from 1871 to 1872 for the Troy Haymakers of the National Association.
- August 8 – Billy Colgan, 33, catcher for the 1884 Pittsburgh Alleghenys of the American Association.
- October 3 – Harry Wright, 60, Hall of Fame player/manager and organizer of baseball's first professional team, the 1869 Cincinnati Red Stockings, who is recognized as the first major league manager to collect 1000 career victories.
- October 16 – Kid Summers, 27, Canadian catcher and outfielder who played for the 1893 St. Louis Browns of the National League.
- November 9 – George Joyce, 48, center fielder for the 1886 Washington Nationals of the National League.
- November 16 – Jim McLaughlin, 34, pitcher/outfielder for the 1884 Baltimore Orioles of the American Association.
- November 20 – Dick Hunt, 48, right fielder/second baseman for the 1872 Brooklyn Eckfords of the National Association.
- December 12 – Harry Fuller, 33, third baseman for the 1891 St. Louis Browns of the American Association.
