= 1895 Washington Senators season =

1895 Washington Senators
- League: National League
- Ballpark: Boundary Field
- City: Washington, D.C.
- Record: 43–85 (.336)
- League place: 10th
- Owners: J. Earl Wagner
- Managers: Gus Schmelz

The 1895 Washington Senators baseball team finished the season with a 43–85 record, tenth place in the National League.

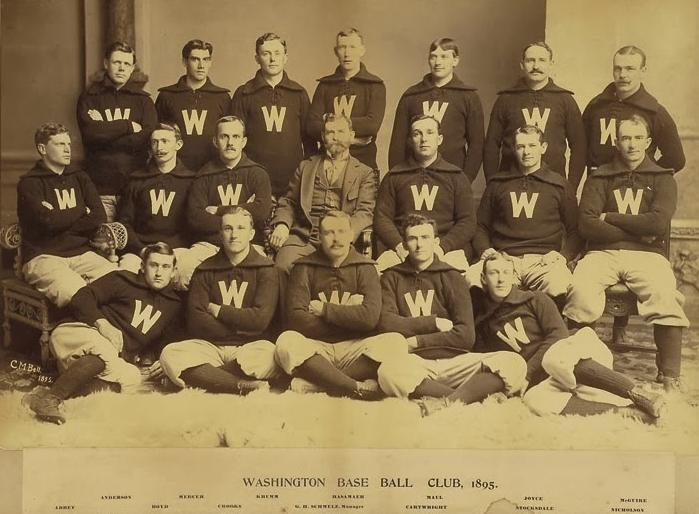
Team photograph

== Regular season ==
=== Season standings ===
National League
| Team | W | L | Pct. | GB | Home | Road |
|---|---|---|---|---|---|---|
| Baltimore Orioles | 87 | 43 | .669 | — | 54‍–‍12 | 33‍–‍31 |
| Cleveland Spiders | 84 | 46 | .646 | 3 | 49‍–‍13 | 35‍–‍33 |
| Philadelphia Phillies | 78 | 53 | .595 | 9½ | 51‍–‍21 | 27‍–‍32 |
| Chicago Colts | 72 | 58 | .554 | 15 | 43‍–‍24 | 29‍–‍34 |
| Brooklyn Grooms | 71 | 60 | .542 | 16½ | 43‍–‍22 | 28‍–‍38 |
| Boston Beaneaters | 71 | 60 | .542 | 16½ | 48‍–‍19 | 23‍–‍41 |
| Pittsburgh Pirates | 71 | 61 | .538 | 17 | 44‍–‍21 | 27‍–‍40 |
| Cincinnati Reds | 66 | 64 | .508 | 21 | 42‍–‍22 | 24‍–‍42 |
| New York Giants | 66 | 65 | .504 | 21½ | 40‍–‍27 | 26‍–‍38 |
| Washington Senators | 43 | 85 | .336 | 43 | 31‍–‍34 | 12‍–‍51 |
| St. Louis Browns | 39 | 92 | .298 | 48½ | 25‍–‍41 | 14‍–‍51 |
| Louisville Colonels | 35 | 96 | .267 | 52½ | 19‍–‍38 | 16‍–‍58 |

=== Record vs. opponents ===
1895 National League record Sources:
| Team | BAL | BSN | BRO | CHI | CIN | CLE | LOU | NYG | PHI | PIT | STL | WAS |
|---|---|---|---|---|---|---|---|---|---|---|---|---|
| Baltimore | — | 10–2 | 7–5 | 8–4 | 8–4 | 5–6 | 10–1 | 9–3 | 8–4–1 | 7–5–1 | 6–6 | 9–3 |
| Boston | 2–10 | — | 4–7 | 7–5 | 5–7 | 6–6 | 9–3–1 | 8–4 | 5–7 | 7–5 | 9–3 | 9–3–1 |
| Brooklyn | 5–7 | 7–4 | — | 6–6 | 5–7 | 2–10 | 11–1 | 9–3–1 | 5–7–1 | 7–5–1 | 9–3 | 5–7 |
| Chicago | 4–8 | 5–7 | 6–6 | — | 5–7 | 6–5 | 9–3–1 | 4–8 | 6–6 | 8–4 | 10–2 | 9–2–2 |
| Cincinnati | 4–8 | 7–5 | 7–5 | 7–5 | — | 6–6 | 6–6 | 4–8 | 4–8 | 4–8–1 | 9–3–1 | 8–2 |
| Cleveland | 6–5 | 6–6 | 10–2 | 5–6 | 6–6 | — | 10–2 | 7–5 | 7–5 | 7–5 | 11–1–2 | 9–3 |
| Louisville | 1–10 | 3–9–1 | 1–11 | 3–9–1 | 6–6 | 2–10 | — | 3–9 | 2–10 | 2–10 | 6–6 | 6–6 |
| New York | 3–9 | 4–8 | 3–9–1 | 8–4 | 8–4 | 5–7 | 9–3 | — | 3–8 | 4–8 | 11–1 | 8–4 |
| Philadelphia | 4–8–1 | 7–5 | 7–5–1 | 6–6 | 8–4 | 5–7 | 10–2 | 8–3 | — | 8–4 | 7–5 | 8–4 |
| Pittsburgh | 5–7–1 | 5–7 | 5–7–1 | 4–8 | 8–4–1 | 5–7 | 10–2 | 8–4 | 4–8 | — | 9–3 | 8–4 |
| St. Louis | 6–6 | 3–9 | 3–9 | 2–10 | 3–9–1 | 1–11–2 | 6–6 | 1–11 | 5–7 | 3–9 | — | 6–5–2 |
| Washington | 3–9 | 3–9–1 | 7–5 | 2–9–2 | 2–8 | 3–9 | 6–6 | 4–8 | 4–8 | 4–8 | 5–6–2 | — |

=== Roster ===
1895 Washington Senators
Roster
| Pitchers: Varney Anderson; Andy Boswell; Fred Buckingham; Joe Corbett; John Gilroy; John Malarkey; Al Maul; Doc McJames; Win Mercer; Carlton Molesworth; Oscar Purner; Otis Stocksdale | Catchers: Dan Mahoney; Deacon McGuire; Infielders: Ed Cartwright; Dan Coogan; Jack Crooks; Gene DeMontreville; Jack Glasscock; Bill Joyce; Bill McCauley; Parson Nicholson; Frank Scheibeck; Phil Wisner; Joe Woerlin | Outfielders: Charlie Abbey; Jake Boyd; Tom Brown; Bill Hassamaer; Billy Lush; Kip Selbach | Manager: Gus Schmelz |

== Player stats ==
=== Batting ===
==== Starters by position ====
Note: Pos = Position; G = Games played; AB = At bats; H = Hits; Avg. = Batting average; HR = Home runs; RBI = Runs batted in

| Pos | Player | G | AB | H | Avg. | HR | RBI |
|---|---|---|---|---|---|---|---|
| C | Deacon McGuire | 133 | 538 | 181 | .336 | 10 | 97 |
| 1B | Ed Cartwright | 122 | 472 | 156 | .331 | 3 | 90 |
| 2B | Jack Crooks | 118 | 412 | 117 | .284 | 6 | 58 |
| SS | Frank Scheibeck | 49 | 172 | 31 | .180 | 0 | 25 |
| 3B | Bill Joyce | 127 | 479 | 149 | .311 | 17 | 97 |
| OF | Kip Selbach | 130 | 519 | 168 | .324 | 6 | 55 |
| OF | Bill Hassamaer | 86 | 363 | 101 | .278 | 1 | 60 |
| OF | Charlie Abbey | 133 | 516 | 142 | .275 | 8 | 84 |

==== Other batters ====
Note: G = Games played; AB = At bats; H = Hits; Avg. = Batting average; HR = Home runs; RBI = Runs batted in

| Player | G | AB | H | Avg. | HR | RBI |
|---|---|---|---|---|---|---|
| Jake Boyd | 52 | 159 | 43 | .270 | 1 | 16 |
| Tom Brown | 34 | 134 | 32 | .239 | 2 | 16 |
| Jack Glasscock | 25 | 100 | 23 | .230 | 0 | 10 |
| Dan Coogan | 26 | 77 | 17 | .221 | 0 | 7 |
| Gene DeMontreville | 12 | 46 | 10 | .217 | 0 | 9 |
| Parson Nicholson | 10 | 38 | 7 | .184 | 0 | 5 |
| Billy Lush | 5 | 18 | 6 | .333 | 0 | 2 |
| Joe Corbett | 7 | 15 | 2 | .133 | 0 | 1 |
| Dan Mahoney | 6 | 12 | 2 | .167 | 0 | 1 |
| Oscar Woehrlin | 1 | 3 | 1 | .333 | 0 | 0 |
| Bill McCauley | 1 | 2 | 0 | .000 | 0 | 0 |
| Phil Wisner | 1 | 0 | 0 | ---- | 0 | 0 |

=== Pitching ===
==== Starting pitchers ====
Note: G = Games pitched; IP = Innings pitched; W = Wins; L = Losses; ERA = Earned run average; SO = Strikeouts

| Player | G | IP | W | L | ERA | SO |
|---|---|---|---|---|---|---|
| Win Mercer | 44 | 313.1 | 13 | 23 | 4.42 | 85 |
| Varney Anderson | 29 | 204.2 | 9 | 16 | 5.89 | 35 |
| Otis Stocksdale | 20 | 136.0 | 6 | 11 | 6.09 | 23 |
| Al Maul | 16 | 135.2 | 10 | 5 | 2.45 | 34 |
| Jake Boyd | 15 | 92.2 | 2 | 11 | 6.80 | 18 |
| Joe Corbett | 3 | 19.0 | 0 | 2 | 5.68 | 3 |
| Doc McJames | 2 | 17.0 | 1 | 1 | 1.59 | 9 |
| Fred Buckingham | 1 | 3.0 | 0 | 0 | 6.00 | 1 |

==== Other pitchers ====
Note: G = Games pitched; IP = Innings pitched; W = Wins; L = Losses; ERA = Earned run average; SO = Strikeouts

| Player | G | IP | W | L | ERA | SO |
|---|---|---|---|---|---|---|
| John Malarkey | 22 | 100.2 | 0 | 8 | 5.99 | 32 |
| John Gilroy | 8 | 41.1 | 1 | 4 | 6.53 | 2 |
| Andy Boswell | 6 | 30.0 | 1 | 2 | 6.00 | 12 |
| Carlton Molesworth | 4 | 16.0 | 0 | 2 | 14.63 | 7 |

==== Relief pitchers ====
Note: G = Games pitched; W = Wins; L = Losses; SV = Saves; ERA = Earned run average; SO = Strikeouts

| Player | G | W | L | SV | ERA | SO |
|---|---|---|---|---|---|---|
| Oscar Purner | 1 | 0 | 0 | 0 | 9.00 | 0 |
