= 1895 Louisville Colonels season =

1895 Louisville Colonels
- League: National League
- Ballpark: Eclipse Park II
- City: Louisville, Kentucky
- Record: 35–96 (.267)
- League place: 12th
- Owners: Barney Dreyfuss
- Managers: John McCloskey

The 1895 Louisville Colonels baseball team finished with a 35–96 record and was last place in the National League for the second straight season.

== Regular season ==
=== Season standings ===
National League
Team	W	L	Pct.	GB	Home	Road
Baltimore Orioles	87	43	.669	—	54‍–‍12	33‍–‍31
Cleveland Spiders	84	46	.646	3	49‍–‍13	35‍–‍33
Philadelphia Phillies	78	53	.595	9½	51‍–‍21	27‍–‍32
Chicago Colts	72	58	.554	15	43‍–‍24	29‍–‍34
Brooklyn Grooms	71	60	.542	16½	43‍–‍22	28‍–‍38
Boston Beaneaters	71	60	.542	16½	48‍–‍19	23‍–‍41
Pittsburgh Pirates	71	61	.538	17	44‍–‍21	27‍–‍40
Cincinnati Reds	66	64	.508	21	42‍–‍22	24‍–‍42
New York Giants	66	65	.504	21½	40‍–‍27	26‍–‍38
Washington Senators	43	85	.336	43	31‍–‍34	12‍–‍51
St. Louis Browns	39	92	.298	48½	25‍–‍41	14‍–‍51
Louisville Colonels	35	96	.267	52½	19‍–‍38	16‍–‍58

=== Record vs. opponents ===
1895 National League record Sources:
Team	BAL	BSN	BRO	CHI	CIN	CLE	LOU	NYG	PHI	PIT	STL	WAS
Baltimore	—	10–2	7–5	8–4	8–4	5–6	10–1	9–3	8–4–1	7–5–1	6–6	9–3
Boston	2–10	—	4–7	7–5	5–7	6–6	9–3–1	8–4	5–7	7–5	9–3	9–3–1
Brooklyn	5–7	7–4	—	6–6	5–7	2–10	11–1	9–3–1	5–7–1	7–5–1	9–3	5–7
Chicago	4–8	5–7	6–6	—	5–7	6–5	9–3–1	4–8	6–6	8–4	10–2	9–2–2
Cincinnati	4–8	7–5	7–5	7–5	—	6–6	6–6	4–8	4–8	4–8–1	9–3–1	8–2
Cleveland	6–5	6–6	10–2	5–6	6–6	—	10–2	7–5	7–5	7–5	11–1–2	9–3
Louisville	1–10	3–9–1	1–11	3–9–1	6–6	2–10	—	3–9	2–10	2–10	6–6	6–6
New York	3–9	4–8	3–9–1	8–4	8–4	5–7	9–3	—	3–8	4–8	11–1	8–4
Philadelphia	4–8–1	7–5	7–5–1	6–6	8–4	5–7	10–2	8–3	—	8–4	7–5	8–4
Pittsburgh	5–7–1	5–7	5–7–1	4–8	8–4–1	5–7	10–2	8–4	4–8	—	9–3	8–4
St. Louis	6–6	3–9	3–9	2–10	3–9–1	1–11–2	6–6	1–11	5–7	3–9	—	6–5–2
Washington	3–9	3–9–1	7–5	2–9–2	2–8	3–9	6–6	4–8	4–8	4–8	5–6–2	—

=== Roster ===
1895 Louisville Colonels
Roster
Pitchers: George Borchers; Bill Childress; Bert Cunningham; Bert Inks; Bill Kling; Phil Knell; Pat Luby; Mike McDermott; Dan McFarlan; George Meakim; Jack Wadsworth; Gus Weyhing	Catchers: Grant Briggs; Henry Cote; Jack Warner; Tub Welch; Fred Zahner; Infielders: Dan Brouthers; Jimmy Collins; Jack Glasscock; Bill Hassamaer; Gil Hatfield; Bill Kemmer; Barry McCormick; Ambrose McGann; Dan Minnehan; Tom Morrison; John O'Brien; Fred Pfeffer; Frank Shugart; Harry Spies; Mike Trost	Outfielders: Hercules Burnett; Fred Clarke; Tom Gettinger; Ducky Holmes; Tom McCreery; Walt Preston; Dan Sweeney; Joe Wright	Manager: John McCloskey

== Player stats ==
=== Batting ===
==== Starters by position ====
Note: Pos = Position; G = Games played; AB = At bats; H = Hits; Avg. = Batting average; HR = Home runs; RBI = Runs batted in

Pos	Player	G	AB	H	Avg.	HR	RBI
C	Jack Warner	67	232	62	.267	1	20
1B	Harry Spies	72	276	74	.268	2	35
2B	John O'Brien	128	539	138	.256	1	50
SS	Frank Shugart	113	473	125	.264	4	70
3B	Jimmy Collins	96	373	104	.279	6	49
OF	Fred Clarke	132	550	191	.347	4	82
OF	Joe Wright	60	228	63	.276	1	30
OF	Tom Gettinger	63	260	70	.269	2	32

==== Other batters ====
Note: G = Games played; AB = At bats; H = Hits; Avg. = Batting average; HR = Home runs; RBI = Runs batted in

Player	G	AB	H	Avg.	HR	RBI
Walt Preston	50	197	55	.279	1	24
Ducky Holmes	40	161	60	.373	3	20
Tub Welch	47	153	37	.242	1	8
Tom McCreery	31	108	35	.324	0	10
Dan Brouthers	24	97	30	.309	2	15
Bill Hassamaer	23	96	20	.208	0	14
Dan Sweeney	22	90	24	.267	1	16
Jack Glasscock	18	74	25	.338	1	6
Ambrose McGann	20	73	21	.288	0	9
Pat Luby	19	53	15	.283	0	9
Fred Zahner	21	49	11	.224	0	6
Fred Pfeffer	11	45	13	.289	0	5
Bill Kemmer	11	38	7	.184	1	3
Dan Minnehan	8	34	13	.382	0	6
Henry Cote	10	33	10	.303	0	5
Tom Morrison	6	22	6	.273	0	4
Hercules Burnett	5	17	7	.412	2	3
Gil Hatfield	5	16	3	.188	0	1
Barry McCormick	3	12	3	.250	0	0
Mike Trost	3	12	1	.083	0	1
Grant Briggs	1	3	0	.000	0	0

=== Pitching ===
==== Starting pitchers ====
Note: G = Games pitched; IP = Innings pitched; W = Wins; L = Losses; ERA = Earned run average; SO = Strikeouts

Player	G	IP	W	L	ERA	SO
Bert Cunningham	31	231.0	11	16	4.75	49
Gus Weyhing	28	213.0	7	19	5.41	53
Mike McDermott	33	207.1	4	19	5.99	42
Bert Inks	28	205.1	7	20	6.40	42
Dan McFarlan	7	46.0	0	7	6.65	10
George Meakim	1	7.0	1	0	2.57	2
George Borchers	1	0.2	0	1	27.00	0

==== Other pitchers ====
Note: G = Games pitched; IP = Innings pitched; W = Wins; L = Losses; ERA = Earned run average; SO = Strikeouts

Player	G	IP	W	L	ERA	SO
Pat Luby	11	71.1	1	5	6.81	12
Phil Knell	10	56.2	0	6	6.51	19
Tom McCreery	8	48.2	3	1	5.36	14
Ducky Holmes	2	14.0	1	0	5.79	0

==== Relief pitchers ====
Note: G = Games pitched; W = Wins; L = Losses; SV = Saves; ERA = Earned run average; SO = Strikeouts

Player	G	W	L	SV	ERA	SO
Jack Wadsworth	2	0	1	0	16.00	2
Tom Gettinger	2	0	0	0	7.11	0
Bill Kling	1	0	0	0	0.00	0
Bill Childress	1	0	0	0	inf	0
