= 1895 Pittsburgh Pirates season =

1895 Pittsburgh Pirates
- League: National League
- Ballpark: Exposition Park
- City: Allegheny, Pennsylvania
- Record: 71–61 (.538)
- League place: 7th
- Owners: William Kerr and Phil Auten
- Managers: Connie Mack

The 1895 Pittsburgh (Note: Until early in the 20th century, the name of Pittsburgh was spelled both with and without the final 'h'.) Pirates season was the 14th season of the Pittsburgh Pirates franchise; their ninth in the National League. The Pirates finished seventh in the National League with a record of 71–61.

== Regular season ==
=== Season standings ===
National League
Team	W	L	Pct.	GB	Home	Road
Baltimore Orioles	87	43	.669	—	54‍–‍12	33‍–‍31
Cleveland Spiders	84	46	.646	3	49‍–‍13	35‍–‍33
Philadelphia Phillies	78	53	.595	9½	51‍–‍21	27‍–‍32
Chicago Colts	72	58	.554	15	43‍–‍24	29‍–‍34
Brooklyn Grooms	71	60	.542	16½	43‍–‍22	28‍–‍38
Boston Beaneaters	71	60	.542	16½	48‍–‍19	23‍–‍41
Pittsburgh Pirates	71	61	.538	17	44‍–‍21	27‍–‍40
Cincinnati Reds	66	64	.508	21	42‍–‍22	24‍–‍42
New York Giants	66	65	.504	21½	40‍–‍27	26‍–‍38
Washington Senators	43	85	.336	43	31‍–‍34	12‍–‍51
St. Louis Browns	39	92	.298	48½	25‍–‍41	14‍–‍51
Louisville Colonels	35	96	.267	52½	19‍–‍38	16‍–‍58

=== Record vs. opponents ===
1895 National League record Sources:
Team	BAL	BSN	BRO	CHI	CIN	CLE	LOU	NYG	PHI	PIT	STL	WAS
Baltimore	—	10–2	7–5	8–4	8–4	5–6	10–1	9–3	8–4–1	7–5–1	6–6	9–3
Boston	2–10	—	4–7	7–5	5–7	6–6	9–3–1	8–4	5–7	7–5	9–3	9–3–1
Brooklyn	5–7	7–4	—	6–6	5–7	2–10	11–1	9–3–1	5–7–1	7–5–1	9–3	5–7
Chicago	4–8	5–7	6–6	—	5–7	6–5	9–3–1	4–8	6–6	8–4	10–2	9–2–2
Cincinnati	4–8	7–5	7–5	7–5	—	6–6	6–6	4–8	4–8	4–8–1	9–3–1	8–2
Cleveland	6–5	6–6	10–2	5–6	6–6	—	10–2	7–5	7–5	7–5	11–1–2	9–3
Louisville	1–10	3–9–1	1–11	3–9–1	6–6	2–10	—	3–9	2–10	2–10	6–6	6–6
New York	3–9	4–8	3–9–1	8–4	8–4	5–7	9–3	—	3–8	4–8	11–1	8–4
Philadelphia	4–8–1	7–5	7–5–1	6–6	8–4	5–7	10–2	8–3	—	8–4	7–5	8–4
Pittsburgh	5–7–1	5–7	5–7–1	4–8	8–4–1	5–7	10–2	8–4	4–8	—	9–3	8–4
St. Louis	6–6	3–9	3–9	2–10	3–9–1	1–11–2	6–6	1–11	5–7	3–9	—	6–5–2
Washington	3–9	3–9–1	7–5	2–9–2	2–8	3–9	6–6	4–8	4–8	4–8	5–6–2	—

=== Roster ===
1895 Pittsburgh Pirates
Roster
Pitchers: Tom Colcolough; Brownie Foreman; Gussie Gannon; Jim Gardner; Bill Hart; Pink Hawley; Jake Hewitt; Harry Jordan; Frank Killen; Jock Menefee; Sam Moran; Gus Weyhing; Dave Wright	Catchers: Tom Kinslow; Connie Mack; Bill Merritt; Joe Sugden; Infielders: Jake Beckley; Lou Bierbauer; Billy Clingman; John Corcoran; Monte Cross; Bill Niles; Bill Stuart	Outfielders: Patsy Donovan; Frank Genins; Mike Smith; Jake Stenzel	Manager: Connie Mack

== Player stats ==
=== Batting ===
==== Starters by position ====
Note: Pos = Position; G = Games played; AB = At bats; H = Hits; Avg. = Batting average; HR = Home runs; RBI = Runs batted in

Pos	Player	G	AB	H	Avg.	HR	RBI
C	Bill Merritt	67	239	68	.285	0	27
1B	Jake Beckley	130	534	175	.328	5	111
2B	Lou Bierbauer	118	470	122	.260	1	71
SS	Monte Cross	109	397	101	.254	3	54
3B	Billy Clingman	107	386	99	.256	0	45
OF	Mike Smith	125	484	146	.302	1	81
OF	Jake Stenzel	130	518	192	.371	7	97
OF	Patsy Donovan	126	522	162	.310	1	59

==== Other batters ====
Note: G = Games played; AB = At bats; H = Hits; Avg. = Batting average; HR = Home runs; RBI = Runs batted in

Player	G	AB	H	Avg.	HR	RBI
Frank Genins	73	252	63	.250	2	24
Joe Sugden	50	158	48	.304	1	17
Bill Stuart	19	77	19	.247	0	10
Tom Kinslow	19	62	14	.226	0	5
Connie Mack	14	49	15	.306	0	4
Bill Niles	11	37	8	.216	0	0
John Corcoran	6	20	3	.150	0	1

=== Pitching ===
==== Starting pitchers ====
Note: G = Games pitched; IP = Innings pitched; W = Wins; L = Losses; ERA = Earned run average; SO = Strikeouts

Player	G	IP	W	L	ERA	SO
Pink Hawley	56	444.1	31	22	3.18	142
Bill Hart	36	261.2	14	17	4.75	85
Brownie Foreman	19	139.2	8	6	3.22	54
Frank Killen	13	95.0	5	5	5.49	25
Jim Gardner	11	85.1	8	2	2.64	31
Tom Colcolough	7	43.1	1	1	6.65	16
Harry Jordan	2	17.0	0	2	4.24	4
Gus Weyhing	1	9.0	1	0	1.00	3

==== Other pitchers ====
Note: G = Games pitched; IP = Innings pitched; W = Wins; L = Losses; ERA = Earned run average; SO = Strikeouts

Player	G	IP	W	L	ERA	SO
Sam Moran	10	62.2	2	4	7.47	19
Jake Hewitt	4	13.0	1	0	4.15	4
Jock Menefee	2	1.2	0	1	16.20	0

==== Relief pitchers ====
Note: G = Games pitched; W = Wins; L = Losses; SV = Saves; ERA = Earned run average; SO = Strikeouts

Player	G	W	L	SV	ERA	SO
Gussie Gannon	1	0	0	0	1.80	0
Dave Wright	1	0	0	0	27.00	0
