= 1895 New York Giants season =

1895 New York Giants
- League: National League
- Ballpark: Polo Grounds
- City: New York City
- Record: 66–65 (.504)
- League place: 9th
- Owners: Andrew Freedman
- Managers: George Davis, Jack Doyle, Harvey Watkins

The 1895 New York Giants season was the franchise's 13th season. The team finished in ninth place in the National League with a 66–65 record, 21.5 games behind the Baltimore Orioles.

== Regular season ==
=== Season standings ===
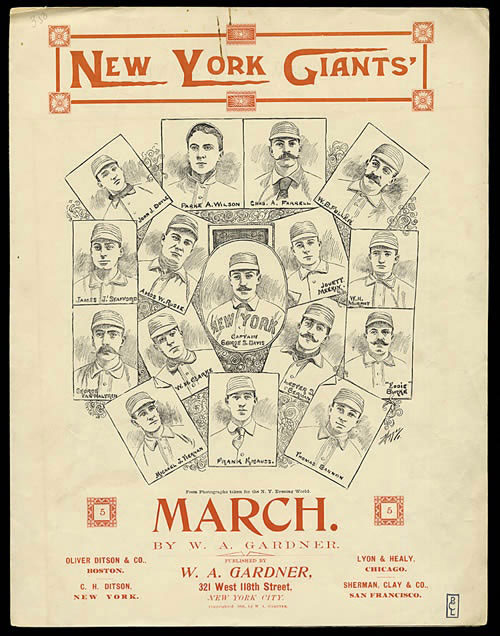

National League
| Team | W | L | Pct. | GB | Home | Road |
|---|---|---|---|---|---|---|
| Baltimore Orioles | 87 | 43 | .669 | — | 54‍–‍12 | 33‍–‍31 |
| Cleveland Spiders | 84 | 46 | .646 | 3 | 49‍–‍13 | 35‍–‍33 |
| Philadelphia Phillies | 78 | 53 | .595 | 9½ | 51‍–‍21 | 27‍–‍32 |
| Chicago Colts | 72 | 58 | .554 | 15 | 43‍–‍24 | 29‍–‍34 |
| Brooklyn Grooms | 71 | 60 | .542 | 16½ | 43‍–‍22 | 28‍–‍38 |
| Boston Beaneaters | 71 | 60 | .542 | 16½ | 48‍–‍19 | 23‍–‍41 |
| Pittsburgh Pirates | 71 | 61 | .538 | 17 | 44‍–‍21 | 27‍–‍40 |
| Cincinnati Reds | 66 | 64 | .508 | 21 | 42‍–‍22 | 24‍–‍42 |
| New York Giants | 66 | 65 | .504 | 21½ | 40‍–‍27 | 26‍–‍38 |
| Washington Senators | 43 | 85 | .336 | 43 | 31‍–‍34 | 12‍–‍51 |
| St. Louis Browns | 39 | 92 | .298 | 48½ | 25‍–‍41 | 14‍–‍51 |
| Louisville Colonels | 35 | 96 | .267 | 52½ | 19‍–‍38 | 16‍–‍58 |

=== Record vs. opponents ===
1895 National League record Sources:
| Team | BAL | BSN | BRO | CHI | CIN | CLE | LOU | NYG | PHI | PIT | STL | WAS |
|---|---|---|---|---|---|---|---|---|---|---|---|---|
| Baltimore | — | 10–2 | 7–5 | 8–4 | 8–4 | 5–6 | 10–1 | 9–3 | 8–4–1 | 7–5–1 | 6–6 | 9–3 |
| Boston | 2–10 | — | 4–7 | 7–5 | 5–7 | 6–6 | 9–3–1 | 8–4 | 5–7 | 7–5 | 9–3 | 9–3–1 |
| Brooklyn | 5–7 | 7–4 | — | 6–6 | 5–7 | 2–10 | 11–1 | 9–3–1 | 5–7–1 | 7–5–1 | 9–3 | 5–7 |
| Chicago | 4–8 | 5–7 | 6–6 | — | 5–7 | 6–5 | 9–3–1 | 4–8 | 6–6 | 8–4 | 10–2 | 9–2–2 |
| Cincinnati | 4–8 | 7–5 | 7–5 | 7–5 | — | 6–6 | 6–6 | 4–8 | 4–8 | 4–8–1 | 9–3–1 | 8–2 |
| Cleveland | 6–5 | 6–6 | 10–2 | 5–6 | 6–6 | — | 10–2 | 7–5 | 7–5 | 7–5 | 11–1–2 | 9–3 |
| Louisville | 1–10 | 3–9–1 | 1–11 | 3–9–1 | 6–6 | 2–10 | — | 3–9 | 2–10 | 2–10 | 6–6 | 6–6 |
| New York | 3–9 | 4–8 | 3–9–1 | 8–4 | 8–4 | 5–7 | 9–3 | — | 3–8 | 4–8 | 11–1 | 8–4 |
| Philadelphia | 4–8–1 | 7–5 | 7–5–1 | 6–6 | 8–4 | 5–7 | 10–2 | 8–3 | — | 8–4 | 7–5 | 8–4 |
| Pittsburgh | 5–7–1 | 5–7 | 5–7–1 | 4–8 | 8–4–1 | 5–7 | 10–2 | 8–4 | 4–8 | — | 9–3 | 8–4 |
| St. Louis | 6–6 | 3–9 | 3–9 | 2–10 | 3–9–1 | 1–11–2 | 6–6 | 1–11 | 5–7 | 3–9 | — | 6–5–2 |
| Washington | 3–9 | 3–9–1 | 7–5 | 2–9–2 | 2–8 | 3–9 | 6–6 | 4–8 | 4–8 | 4–8 | 5–6–2 | — |

=== Roster ===
1895 New York Giants
Roster
| Pitchers: Andy Boswell; Dad Clarke; Ed Doheny; Les German; Frank Knauss; Jouett Meekin; Amos Rusie | Catchers: Duke Farrell; Pop Schriver; Parke Wilson; Infielders: Larry Battam; Willie Clark; George Davis; Harry Davis; Jack Doyle; Shorty Fuller; General Stafford | Outfielders: Tom Bannon; Eddie Burke; Oyster Burns; Frank Butler; Yale Murphy; Mike Tiernan; George Van Haltren | Manager: George Davis; Jack Doyle; Harvey Watkins |

== Player stats ==
=== Batting ===
==== Starters by position ====
Note: Pos = Position; G = Games played; AB = At bats; H = Hits; Avg. = Batting average; HR = Home runs; RBI = Runs batted in

| Pos | Player | G | AB | H | Avg. | HR | RBI |
|---|---|---|---|---|---|---|---|
| C | Duke Farrell | 90 | 312 | 90 | .288 | 1 | 58 |
| 1B | Jack Doyle | 82 | 319 | 100 | .313 | 1 | 66 |
| 2B | General Stafford | 124 | 463 | 129 | .279 | 3 | 73 |
| SS | Shorty Fuller | 126 | 458 | 103 | .225 | 0 | 32 |
| 3B | George Davis | 110 | 430 | 146 | .340 | 5 | 101 |
| OF | Eddie Burke | 39 | 167 | 43 | .257 | 1 | 12 |
| OF | Mike Tiernan | 120 | 476 | 165 | .347 | 7 | 70 |
| OF | George Van Haltren | 131 | 521 | 177 | .340 | 8 | 103 |

==== Other batters ====
Note: G = Games played; AB = At bats; H = Hits; Avg. = Batting average; HR = Home runs; RBI = Runs batted in

| Player | G | AB | H | Avg. | HR | RBI |
|---|---|---|---|---|---|---|
| Parke Wilson | 67 | 238 | 56 | .235 | 0 | 30 |
| Yale Murphy | 51 | 184 | 37 | .201 | 0 | 16 |
| Tom Bannon | 37 | 159 | 43 | .270 | 0 | 8 |
| Oyster Burns | 33 | 114 | 35 | .307 | 1 | 25 |
| Pop Schriver | 24 | 92 | 29 | .315 | 1 | 16 |
| Willie Clark | 23 | 88 | 23 | .261 | 0 | 16 |
| Harry Davis | 7 | 24 | 7 | .292 | 0 | 6 |
| Frank Butler | 5 | 22 | 6 | .273 | 0 | 2 |
| Larry Battam | 2 | 4 | 1 | .250 | 0 | 0 |

=== Pitching ===
==== Starting pitchers ====
Note: G = Games pitched; IP = Innings pitched; W = Wins; L = Losses; ERA = Earned run average; SO = Strikeouts

| Player | G | IP | W | L | ERA | SO |
|---|---|---|---|---|---|---|
| Amos Rusie | 49 | 393.1 | 23 | 23 | 3.73 | 201 |
| Dad Clarke | 37 | 281.2 | 18 | 15 | 3.39 | 67 |
| Jouett Meekin | 29 | 225.2 | 16 | 11 | 5.30 | 76 |
| Les German | 25 | 178.1 | 7 | 11 | 5.96 | 36 |
| Andy Boswell | 5 | 34.0 | 2 | 2 | 5.82 | 18 |
| Ed Doheny | 3 | 25.2 | 0 | 3 | 6.66 | 9 |
| Frank Knauss | 1 | 3.2 | 0 | 0 | 17.18 | 1 |

==== Relief pitchers ====
Note: G = Games pitched; W = Wins; L = Losses; SV = Saves; ERA = Earned run average; SO = Strikeouts

| Player | G | W | L | SV | ERA | SO |
|---|---|---|---|---|---|---|
| George Van Haltren | 1 | 0 | 0 | 0 | 12.60 | 0 |
