= Billy Clingman =

American baseball player (1869–1958)

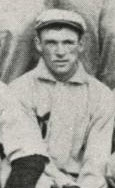
- Clingman in 1898
- Third Baseman / Shortstop
- Born: William Frederick Clingman; November 21, 1869; Cincinnati, Ohio, US
- Died: May 14, 1958 (aged 88); Cincinnati, Ohio, US
- Batted: Switch Threw: Right

MLB debut
- September 9, 1890, for the Cincinnati Reds

Last MLB appearance
- July 16, 1903, for the Cleveland Naps

MLB statistics
- Batting average: .245
- Home runs: 8
- Runs batted in: 302
- Stats at Baseball Reference

Teams
- Cincinnati Reds (1890); Cincinnati Kelly's Killers (1891); Pittsburgh Pirates (1895); Louisville Colonels (1896–1899); Chicago Orphans (1900); Washington Senators (1901); Cleveland Naps (1903)

William Frederick Clingman Sr. (November 21, 1869 – May 14, 1958) was an American baseball player. He played Major League Baseball from 1890 to 1903, and played as third baseman and shortstop.

== Early life ==
Clingman was born on November 21, 1869, in Cincinnati, one of five children born to John Clingman and Mary Clingman. In interviews, he spoke of climbing utility poles to watch baseball games at the Bank Street Grounds. His favorite player was Bid McPhee. After basic schooling, he worked as an engraver, playing baseball during the day and working nights. Physically, he was 5 ft 11 in (1.80 m) and weighed 150 pounds (68 kg).

== Baseball career ==
=== Before 1890–1894: early career ===
Clingman played for local teams such as the Lincolns, the Shamrocks, and the Indians, as well as a traveling team sponsored by The Cincinnati Enquirer. With the Indians, he faced Major League teams and batted against pitchers such as Tony Mullane and Billy Rhines. In 1890, he and Billy Klusman were signed to the Mansfield Pioneers, of Minor League Baseball. He debuted for the team on May 23, winning 6–0 against the Wheeling Stogies. His batting average for the season was .292, and his fielding percentage was .879. He became a free agent after the season concluded, when the team disbanded.

On September 5, 1890, Clingman signed to the Cincinnati Reds. He debuted on September 9 as a shortstop; the Reds won 8–4 against the Boston Red Sox that season. He played the next few games as shortstop, being transferred to second baseman while Bid McPhee recovered from a hand injury.

In the postseason, the Reds were sold to Al Johnson. He moved the team to Players' League, which disbanded shortly thereafter, making Clingman a free agent. Due to an injury, he failed a tryout for the St. Louis Browns. He signed with the Terre Haute Hottentots, of the Minor League, for the 1891 season, during which he was the manager and played second baseman. In July, he caused a loss to the Evansville Evas after committing three errors.

On July 23, Clingman, Joe Burke, and Wild Bill Widner were traded to the Cincinnati Kelly's Killers. The three played one game against the Browns on July 24. Clingman, who played second baseman that game, was called a "big improvement" over his predecessor, Yank Robinson, who returned to the team the following game, after which Clingman, Burke, and Widner were removed from the team.

Clingman then joined the Jamestown, New York minor league team, with which he played shortstop, as well as second and third baseman on occasion, and as pitcher in one game. He played three games with the Indianapolis Hoosiers, being called a "top fielder" by local newspapers, but was overall inconsistent.

Clingman then played shortstop for the Memphis Giants for a little over 50 games, before the Western League disbanded. Moving to the Southern League, Bones Ely replaced him on shortstop, with him becoming second baseman. His batting average improve from .277 to .310 after moving positions. In the 1894 season, he played shortstop and second baseman the Milwaukee Brewers. The Brewers were the weakest team in the league. It constantly shuffled players in and out of the roster, with Clingman and Scoops Carey being the only two players to play over 100 games with the team that season.

=== 1895–1903: later career ===
In the 1895 season, Clingman's contract was sold to the Pittsburgh Pirates, for which he played as its third baseman. He injured his hand in August and spent his recovery coaching the team's first basemen. In one game, Gene DeMontreville hit a home run, but Clingman dropped a ball which he hid in his shirt and got him out, ending the game in a tie. On a different occasion, he punched in the eye by Bill Keister while trying to tag him out.

By the end of the season, Clingman fielded .888, the second-highest among third basemen, behind Lave Cross. The Pirates kept Clingman's contract for the 1896 season, though he and two other players were left behind by the rest of the team, with him being replaced by Denny Lyons. He was traded to the Louisville Colonels in early May in exchange for Eddie Boyle and Joe Wright. His first game with the team came on May 4, and he played third baseman with the team. The following spring, he began switch hitting to improve his offense.

In 1896, it was planned that Charlie Dexter become the starting third baseman over Clingman, but the plan was abandoned after Dexter lost a fingernail in a practice game late spring. Later, he gave third base to Honus Wagner and finished the season as shortstop. He played 110 games in the 1897 season, missing some early games due to malaria and being hit by pitch. He played with the Colonels until December 4, 1899, when the team combined with the Pirates, cutting Clingman and others due to high salaries. Those who were cut were sold to the Chicago Orphans on December 13. He played shortstop for 47 games before being released, afterward joining the Kansas City Blues of the Minor League.

In 1901, Clingman joined the Washington Senators in its inaugural season with the Major League. He debuted with the team on April 27, as a shortstop; in the fifth inning, he hit the first home run in the team's history. On December 18, he signed to the Milwaukee Brewers as a player-manager. He also held shares in the Omaha Packers. He reportedly batted left exclusively that season. The following season, the Brewers hired Joe Cantillon as manager. Clingman assumed this made him a free agent, so signed to the Columbus Senators in the fall. However, the Brewers held his contract and traded him to the St. Paul Saints. The board of directors declared him a member of the Saints. The Senators ignored this and he opened the season with them.

On May 10, Clingman was traded to the Cleveland Naps in exchange for Jack Thoney. It was reported that the Chicago Cubs and the Detroit Tigers were also interested in Clingman around this time. It was decided by the board that he was of the Naps. He was the Naps' starting shortstop, which was a point of contention with the more popular John Gochnaur. He played his last Major League game on July 16, before he and Gus Dorner were later traded to the Cleveland Senators in exchange for Terry Turner.

Clingman was released from Cleveland the following season, and by mid-April was again signed to St. Paul. He was the team's utility player. He was released from the team and replaced by Jack Flourney. On July 9, 1904, he joined the Toledo Mud Hens as its manager and shortstop. In mid-March 1905, he announced his retirement from professional baseball, though returned to the Mud Hens as shortstop. Performing poorly, he permanently retired after that season, though continued to play semiprofessionally around Louisville.

Over his career with the Major Leagues, Clingman played 621 games. He posted a .245 batting average, with 413 runs, 133 doubles, 63 triples, 8 home runs, 400 RBI, 98 stolen bases, .323 on-base percentage and .306 slugging percentage. Around the 1930s, he was rated as one of the best third basemen in baseball history, being compared to Jimmy Collins. As shortstop, he played deep into the field, being compared to Herman Long and Hughie Jennings.

== Post-baseball and personal life ==
Clingman maintained his engraving skills throughout his baseball career. In winter 1904, he and his family moved to Louisville, Kentucky, where he worked as an engraver through the winter. After retiring from baseball, he took fulltime employment with the Tinsley-Mayer Company as an engraver. Mr. Tinsley retired in 1912, and Clingman became vice-president, and in 1920, he purchased a stake, renaming the company to the Tinsley-Clingman Engraving. From 1929 until his retirement in 1947, he owned and operated his private firm, William F. Clingman Engravers. He remained physically active in his later life, playing golf and tennis and swimming, though lost interest in baseball.

On January 14, 1891, Clingman married Clara Mae Gibner, with whom he had four children. He lived in Bond Hill, Cincinnati. On February 4, 1932, he was erroneously reported as being dead for several years at that point. His wife died in 1949, after which he moved in with his grandson. In February 1958, he and his family moved to Cincinnati. He became sick in April of that year, dying on May 14, 1958, aged 88, in Cincinnati, and was buried at Cave Hill Cemetery, in Louisville.
