= Dan Sweeney =

Dan Sweeney may refer to:

- Dan Sweeney (baseball)
- Dan Sweeney (footballer)

== See also ==
- D. B. Sweeney (Daniel Bernard Sweeney), American actor
