= 1895 Boston Beaneaters season =

1895 Boston Beaneaters
- League: National League
- Ballpark: South End Grounds
- City: Boston, Massachusetts
- Record: 71–60–2 (.542)
- League place: 6th
- Owners: Arthur Soden
- Managers: Frank Selee (6th season)

The 1895 Boston Beaneaters season was the 24th season of the franchise. The team finished in 6th place in the National League with a record of 71–60–2 (.542), 16.5 games behind the first-place Baltimore Orioles.

== Regular season ==
=== Season standings ===
National League
Team	W	L	Pct.	GB	Home	Road
Baltimore Orioles	87	43	.669	—	54‍–‍12	33‍–‍31
Cleveland Spiders	84	46	.646	3	49‍–‍13	35‍–‍33
Philadelphia Phillies	78	53	.595	9½	51‍–‍21	27‍–‍32
Chicago Colts	72	58	.554	15	43‍–‍24	29‍–‍34
Brooklyn Grooms	71	60	.542	16½	43‍–‍22	28‍–‍38
Boston Beaneaters	71	60	.542	16½	48‍–‍19	23‍–‍41
Pittsburgh Pirates	71	61	.538	17	44‍–‍21	27‍–‍40
Cincinnati Reds	66	64	.508	21	42‍–‍22	24‍–‍42
New York Giants	66	65	.504	21½	40‍–‍27	26‍–‍38
Washington Senators	43	85	.336	43	31‍–‍34	12‍–‍51
St. Louis Browns	39	92	.298	48½	25‍–‍41	14‍–‍51
Louisville Colonels	35	96	.267	52½	19‍–‍38	16‍–‍58

=== Record vs. opponents ===
1895 National League record Sources:
Team	BAL	BSN	BRO	CHI	CIN	CLE	LOU	NYG	PHI	PIT	STL	WAS
Baltimore	—	10–2	7–5	8–4	8–4	5–6	10–1	9–3	8–4–1	7–5–1	6–6	9–3
Boston	2–10	—	4–7	7–5	5–7	6–6	9–3–1	8–4	5–7	7–5	9–3	9–3–1
Brooklyn	5–7	7–4	—	6–6	5–7	2–10	11–1	9–3–1	5–7–1	7–5–1	9–3	5–7
Chicago	4–8	5–7	6–6	—	5–7	6–5	9–3–1	4–8	6–6	8–4	10–2	9–2–2
Cincinnati	4–8	7–5	7–5	7–5	—	6–6	6–6	4–8	4–8	4–8–1	9–3–1	8–2
Cleveland	6–5	6–6	10–2	5–6	6–6	—	10–2	7–5	7–5	7–5	11–1–2	9–3
Louisville	1–10	3–9–1	1–11	3–9–1	6–6	2–10	—	3–9	2–10	2–10	6–6	6–6
New York	3–9	4–8	3–9–1	8–4	8–4	5–7	9–3	—	3–8	4–8	11–1	8–4
Philadelphia	4–8–1	7–5	7–5–1	6–6	8–4	5–7	10–2	8–3	—	8–4	7–5	8–4
Pittsburgh	5–7–1	5–7	5–7–1	4–8	8–4–1	5–7	10–2	8–4	4–8	—	9–3	8–4
St. Louis	6–6	3–9	3–9	2–10	3–9–1	1–11–2	6–6	1–11	5–7	3–9	—	6–5–2
Washington	3–9	3–9–1	7–5	2–9–2	2–8	3–9	6–6	4–8	4–8	4–8	5–6–2	—

=== Roster ===
1895 Boston Beaneaters
Roster
Pitchers: Cozy Dolan; Kid Nichols; Fred Sexton; Jack Stivetts; Otis Stocksdale; Jim Sullivan; Zeke Wilson; Bill Yerrick	Catchers: Charlie Ganzel; Jack Ryan; Jack Warner; Infielders: Joe Harrington; Herman Long; Bobby Lowe; Billy Nash; Charlie Nyce; Tommy Tucker	Outfielders: Jimmy Bannon; Jimmy Collins; Hugh Duffy; Tommy McCarthy; Fred Tenney	Manager: Frank Selee

== Player stats ==
=== Batting ===
==== Starters by position ====
Note: Pos = Position; G = Games played; AB = At bats; H = Hits; Avg. = Batting average; HR = Home runs; RBI = Runs batted in

Pos	Player	G	AB	H	Avg.	HR	RBI
C	Charlie Ganzel	81	280	73	.261	1	52
1B	Tommy Tucker	126	465	115	.247	3	73
2B	Bobby Lowe	100	417	124	.297	7	62
SS	Herman Long	125	540	170	.315	9	75
3B	Billy Nash	133	513	149	.290	10	110
OF	Hugh Duffy	131	533	188	.353	9	100
OF	Jimmy Bannon	124	493	171	.347	6	74
OF	Tommy McCarthy	117	452	131	.290	2	73

==== Other batters ====
Note: G = Games played; AB = At bats; H = Hits; Avg. = Batting average; HR = Home runs; RBI = Runs batted in

Player	G	AB	H	Avg.	HR	RBI
Jack Ryan	49	189	55	.291	0	18
Fred Tenney	49	173	47	.272	1	21
Joe Harrington	18	65	18	.277	2	13
Jimmy Collins	11	38	8	.211	1	8
Charlie Nyce	9	35	8	.229	2	9
Frank Sexton	10	26	7	.269	0	3
Jack Warner	3	7	1	.143	0	1

=== Pitching ===
==== Starting pitchers ====
Note: G = Games pitched; IP = Innings pitched; W = Wins; L = Losses; ERA = Earned run average; SO = Strikeouts

Player	G	IP	W	L	ERA	SO
Kid Nichols	48	390.2	26	16	3.41	148
Jack Stivetts	38	291.0	17	17	4.64	111
Cozy Dolan	25	198.1	11	7	4.27	47
Jim Sullivan	21	178.1	11	9	4.74	45
Zeke Wilson	6	45.0	2	4	5.20	5
Otis Stocksdale	4	23.0	2	2	5.87	2
Bill Yerrick	1	7.0	1	0	0.00	4

==== Other pitchers ====
Note: G = Games pitched; IP = Innings pitched; W = Wins; L = Losses; ERA = Earned run average; SO = Strikeouts

Player	G	IP	W	L	ERA	SO
Frank Sexton	7	49.0	1	5	5.69	14

==== Relief pitchers ====
Note: G = Games pitched; W = Wins; L = Losses; SV = Saves; ERA = Earned run average; SO = Strikeouts

Player	G	W	L	SV	ERA	SO
Jimmy Bannon	1	0	0	0	6.00	1
