= Harvey Watkins =

American baseball manager

- Manager
- Born: June 14, 1869; Seneca Falls, New York, U.S.
- Died: April 29, 1949 (aged 79); Harrow, England
- Batted: Unknown Threw: Unknown

MLB statistics
- Managerial W–L: 18-17
- Games: 35
- Winning percentage: .514

Teams
- New York Giants (1895)

Harvey Lennox Watkins (June 14, 1869 – April 29, 1949) was an American manager in Major League Baseball. In the 1895 season, with the New York Giants he was the club's manager. During his lone season as manager, he led the Giants to 18 wins, with 17 losses in 35 games.

He was born in Seneca Falls, New York and died in Harrow, England in 1949. Watkins married an English woman and they eventually moved to England. Watkins and his wife both died when their furnace malfunctioned.

== See also ==
- San Francisco Giants general managers and managers
