= Bill McCauley =

American baseball player (1869–1926)

- Shortstop
- Born: December 20, 1869; Washington, D.C.
- Died: January 27, 1926 (aged 56); Washington, D.C.
- Batted: Unknown Threw: Unknown

MLB debut
- August 31, 1895, for the Washington Senators

Last MLB appearance
- August 31, 1895, for the Washington Senators

MLB statistics
- Batting average: .000
- Runs batted in: 0
- Home runs: 0
- Stats at Baseball Reference

Teams
- Washington Senators (1895)

William H. McCauley (December 20, 1869 – January 27, 1926) was a Major League Baseball player for the Washington Senators. He appeared in one game, on August 31, 1895 and was hitless in two at-bats.
