= Gussie Gannon =

American baseball player (1873–1966)

- Pitcher
- Born: November 26, 1873; Erie, Pennsylvania, U.S.
- Died: April 13, 1966 (aged 92); Erie, Pennsylvania, U.S.
- Batted: Left Threw: Left

MLB debut
- June 15, 1895, for the Pittsburgh Pirates

Last MLB appearance
- June 15, 1895, for the Pittsburgh Pirates

MLB statistics
- Win–loss record: 0–0
- Earned run average: 1.80
- Strikeouts: 0
- Stats at Baseball Reference

Teams
- Pittsburgh Pirates (1895)

James Edward Gannon (November 26, 1873 – April 13, 1966) was an American professional baseball player. He was a pitcher for the Pittsburgh Pirates of the National League in one game, on June 15, 1895. He pitched five innings, allowing one earned run in the game. He also spent several years in the minors, finishing his career in 1900.
