= King Bailey =

American baseball player (1870–1917)

- Pitcher
- Born: November 1870; Tunstall Station, Virginia, U.S.
- Died: November 19, 1917; Macon, Georgia, U.S.
- Batted: Left Threw: Left

MLB debut
- September 21, 1895, for the Cincinnati Reds

Last MLB appearance
- September 21, 1895, for the Cincinnati Reds

MLB statistics
- Win–loss record: 1–0
- Earned run average: 5.63
- Strikeouts: 0
- Stats at Baseball Reference

Teams
- Cincinnati Reds (1895)

Linwood C. "King" Bailey (November 1870 – November 19, 1917) was an American professional baseball pitcher for the Cincinnati Reds. Born in Virginia, he died in Macon, Georgia. He played only one entire baseball game for the Cincinnati Reds during his career, which he won, on September 21, 1895. He batted and threw left-handed.
