= John Corcoran (baseball) =

American baseball player (1873–1901)

- Shortstop/Third baseman
- Born: 1873; Cincinnati, Ohio, U.S.
- Died: November 22, 1901 (aged 27–28); Cincinnati, Ohio, U.S.
- Batted: Unknown Threw: Left

MLB debut
- September 17, 1895, for the Pittsburgh Pirates

Last MLB appearance
- September 21, 1895, for the Pittsburgh Pirates

MLB statistics
- Batting average: .150
- Hits: 3
- Stolen bases: 0
- Stats at Baseball Reference

Teams
- Pittsburgh Pirates (1895)

John James Corcoran (1873 – November 22, 1901) was an American Major League Baseball player. Niles played for Pittsburgh Pirates in the 1895 season. He played just six games in his career.
