= Deke White =

American baseball player (1872–1957)

- Pitcher
- Born: September 8, 1872; Albany, New York, U.S.
- Died: November 27, 1957 (aged 85); Albany, New York, U.S.
- Batted: Both Threw: Left

MLB debut
- September 14, 1895, for the Philadelphia Phillies

Last MLB appearance
- September 27, 1895, for the Philadelphia Phillies

MLB statistics
- Win–loss record: 1–0
- Earned run average: 9.87
- Strikeouts: 6
- Stats at Baseball Reference

Teams
- Philadelphia Phillies (1895)

George Frederick "Deke" White (September 8, 1872 – November 5, 1957) was an American professional baseball pitcher with the Philadelphia Phillies in the 1895 season.

In 3 career games, he had a 1–0 record with a 9.87 ERA. He batted right and left and threw left-handed.

White was born in Albany, New York, and died in Ilion, New York.
