= Phil Wisner =

American baseball player (1869–1936)

- Shortstop
- Born: July 1869; Washington, D.C.
- Died: July 5, 1936 (aged 67); Washington, D.C.
- Batted: Unknown Threw: Right

MLB debut
- August 30, 1895, for the Washington Senators

Last MLB appearance
- August 30, 1895, for the Washington Senators

MLB statistics
- Games: 1
- Total chances: 4
- Errors: 3
- Stats at Baseball Reference

Teams
- Washington Senators (1895)

Philip N. Wisner (July 1869 – July 5, 1936) was a professional baseball player. Wisner played one game in Major League Baseball for Washington Senators in 1895 as a shortstop. Although he did not have a plate appearance, he fielded four total chances, three of which resulted in an error.

Wisner was born in and died in Washington, D.C.
