= George Hogreiver =

American baseball player (1869–1961)

- Outfielder
- Born: March 17, 1869; Cincinnati, Ohio, U.S.
- Died: January 26, 1961 (aged 91); Appleton, Wisconsin, U.S.
- Batted: Right Threw: Right

MLB debut
- April 24, 1895, for the Cincinnati Reds

Last MLB appearance
- September 13, 1901, for the Milwaukee Brewers

MLB statistics
- Batting average: .254
- Home runs: 2
- Runs batted in: 50
- Stats at Baseball Reference

Teams
- Cincinnati Reds (1895); Milwaukee Brewers (1901)

George C. "Stormy" Hogreiver (March 17, 1869 – January 26, 1961) was an American outfielder in Major League Baseball. He played for the Cincinnati Reds and Milwaukee Brewers. Hogreiver also umpired three National League games in 1893. His baseball career ended after a shoulder injury in 1912.
