= 1895 Cleveland Spiders season =

1895 Cleveland Spiders
- Temple Cup Champions
- League: National League
- Ballpark: League Park
- City: Cleveland, Ohio
- Record: 84–46 (.646)
- League place: 2nd
- Owners: Frank Robison
- Managers: Patsy Tebeau

The 1895 Cleveland Spiders finished with an 84–46 record and a second-place finish in the National League. After the season they played the first-place Baltimore Orioles in the Temple Cup series, defeating them 4 games to 1.

== Regular season ==
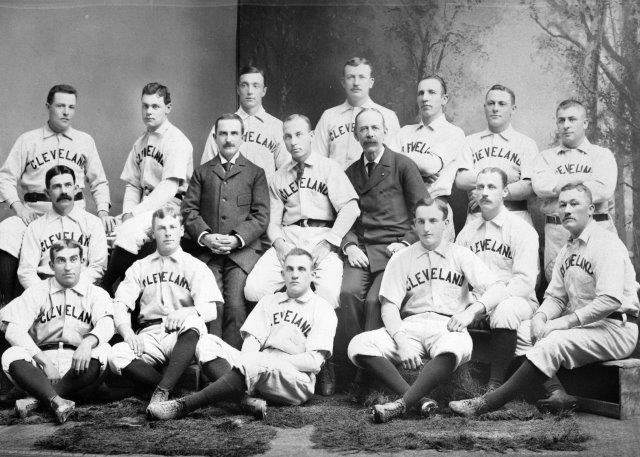
1895 Cleveland Spiders

=== Season standings ===
National League
Team	W	L	Pct.	GB	Home	Road
Baltimore Orioles	87	43	.669	—	54‍–‍12	33‍–‍31
Cleveland Spiders	84	46	.646	3	49‍–‍13	35‍–‍33
Philadelphia Phillies	78	53	.595	9½	51‍–‍21	27‍–‍32
Chicago Colts	72	58	.554	15	43‍–‍24	29‍–‍34
Brooklyn Grooms	71	60	.542	16½	43‍–‍22	28‍–‍38
Boston Beaneaters	71	60	.542	16½	48‍–‍19	23‍–‍41
Pittsburgh Pirates	71	61	.538	17	44‍–‍21	27‍–‍40
Cincinnati Reds	66	64	.508	21	42‍–‍22	24‍–‍42
New York Giants	66	65	.504	21½	40‍–‍27	26‍–‍38
Washington Senators	43	85	.336	43	31‍–‍34	12‍–‍51
St. Louis Browns	39	92	.298	48½	25‍–‍41	14‍–‍51
Louisville Colonels	35	96	.267	52½	19‍–‍38	16‍–‍58

=== Record vs. opponents ===
1895 National League record Sources:
Team	BAL	BSN	BRO	CHI	CIN	CLE	LOU	NYG	PHI	PIT	STL	WAS
Baltimore	—	10–2	7–5	8–4	8–4	5–6	10–1	9–3	8–4–1	7–5–1	6–6	9–3
Boston	2–10	—	4–7	7–5	5–7	6–6	9–3–1	8–4	5–7	7–5	9–3	9–3–1
Brooklyn	5–7	7–4	—	6–6	5–7	2–10	11–1	9–3–1	5–7–1	7–5–1	9–3	5–7
Chicago	4–8	5–7	6–6	—	5–7	6–5	9–3–1	4–8	6–6	8–4	10–2	9–2–2
Cincinnati	4–8	7–5	7–5	7–5	—	6–6	6–6	4–8	4–8	4–8–1	9–3–1	8–2
Cleveland	6–5	6–6	10–2	5–6	6–6	—	10–2	7–5	7–5	7–5	11–1–2	9–3
Louisville	1–10	3–9–1	1–11	3–9–1	6–6	2–10	—	3–9	2–10	2–10	6–6	6–6
New York	3–9	4–8	3–9–1	8–4	8–4	5–7	9–3	—	3–8	4–8	11–1	8–4
Philadelphia	4–8–1	7–5	7–5–1	6–6	8–4	5–7	10–2	8–3	—	8–4	7–5	8–4
Pittsburgh	5–7–1	5–7	5–7–1	4–8	8–4–1	5–7	10–2	8–4	4–8	—	9–3	8–4
St. Louis	6–6	3–9	3–9	2–10	3–9–1	1–11–2	6–6	1–11	5–7	3–9	—	6–5–2
Washington	3–9	3–9–1	7–5	2–9–2	2–8	3–9	6–6	4–8	4–8	4–8	5–6–2	—

=== Roster ===
1895 Cleveland Spiders
Roster
Pitchers: George Cuppy; Phil Knell; Mike Sullivan; Bobby Wallace; Zeke Wilson; Cy Young	Catchers: Fred Donovan; Jack O'Connor; Tom O'Meara; Chief Zimmer; Infielders: Cupid Childs; Ed Gremminger; Chippy McGarr; Ed McKean; Patsy Tebeau	Outfielders: Harry Blake; Jesse Burkett; Jimmy McAleer; George Tebeau; Pussy Tebeau	Manager: Patsy Tebeau

== Player stats ==
=== Batting ===
==== Starters by position ====
Note: Pos = Position; G = Games played; AB = At bats; H = Hits; Avg. = Batting average; HR = Home runs; RBI = Runs batted in

Pos	Player	G	AB	H	Avg.	HR	RBI
C	Chief Zimmer	88	315	107	.340	5	56
1B	Patsy Tebeau	63	264	84	.318	2	52
2B	Cupid Childs	120	466	134	.288	4	90
SS	Ed McKean	132	569	194	.341	8	119
3B	Chippy McGarr	113	422	114	.270	2	59
OF	Jimmy McAleer	132	532	144	.271	0	68
OF	Jesse Burkett	132	555	225	.405	5	83
OF	Harry Blake	85	318	88	.277	3	45

==== Other batters ====
Note: G = Games played; AB = At bats; H = Hits; Avg. = Batting average; HR = Home runs; RBI = Runs batted in

Player	G	AB	H	Avg.	HR	RBI
Jack O'Connor	90	343	100	.292	0	58
George Tebeau	92	341	111	.326	0	68
Ed Gremminger	20	78	21	.269	0	15
Fred Donovan	3	12	1	.083	0	1
Pussy Tebeau	2	6	3	.500	0	1
Tom O'Meara	1	1	0	.000	0	0

=== Pitching ===
==== Starting pitchers ====
Note: G = Games pitched; IP = Innings pitched; W = Wins; L = Losses; ERA = Earned run average; SO = Strikeouts

Player	G	IP	W	L	ERA	SO
Cy Young	47	369.2	35	10	3.26	121
George Cuppy	47	353.0	26	14	3.54	91
Bobby Wallace	30	228.2	12	14	4.09	63
Zeke Wilson	9	52.2	3	1	4.27	20

==== Other pitchers ====
Note: G = Games pitched; IP = Innings pitched; W = Wins; L = Losses; ERA = Earned run average; SO = Strikeouts

Player	G	IP	W	L	ERA	SO
Phil Knell	20	116.2	7	5	5.40	30
Mike Sullivan	4	31.0	1	2	8.42	5
