= 1895 Philadelphia Phillies season =

National League season

1895 Philadelphia Phillies
- League: National League
- Ballpark: Philadelphia Base Ball Grounds
- City: Philadelphia, Pennsylvania
- Record: 78–53 (.595)
- League place: 3rd
- Owners: Al Reach, John Rogers
- Managers: Arthur Irwin

The 1895 National League baseball season was the Philadelphia Phillies' third season as a team and their first training at the National Home for Disabled Volunteer Soldiers.

== Preseason ==
The Phillies held spring training in 1895 in Hampton, Virginia at the National Home for Disabled Volunteer Soldiers where the team roomed at the Home's private hotel, and trained and played exhibition games at the Hampton Soldiers' Home athletic grounds located 300 yards from the team hotel. It was the first of two seasons the Phillies would train at the Soldiers' Home in Hampton.

== Regular season ==
=== Season standings ===
National League
Team	W	L	Pct.	GB	Home	Road
Baltimore Orioles	87	43	.669	—	54‍–‍12	33‍–‍31
Cleveland Spiders	84	46	.646	3	49‍–‍13	35‍–‍33
Philadelphia Phillies	78	53	.595	9½	51‍–‍21	27‍–‍32
Chicago Colts	72	58	.554	15	43‍–‍24	29‍–‍34
Brooklyn Grooms	71	60	.542	16½	43‍–‍22	28‍–‍38
Boston Beaneaters	71	60	.542	16½	48‍–‍19	23‍–‍41
Pittsburgh Pirates	71	61	.538	17	44‍–‍21	27‍–‍40
Cincinnati Reds	66	64	.508	21	42‍–‍22	24‍–‍42
New York Giants	66	65	.504	21½	40‍–‍27	26‍–‍38
Washington Senators	43	85	.336	43	31‍–‍34	12‍–‍51
St. Louis Browns	39	92	.298	48½	25‍–‍41	14‍–‍51
Louisville Colonels	35	96	.267	52½	19‍–‍38	16‍–‍58

=== Record vs. opponents ===
1895 National League record Sources:
Team	BAL	BSN	BRO	CHI	CIN	CLE	LOU	NYG	PHI	PIT	STL	WAS
Baltimore	—	10–2	7–5	8–4	8–4	5–6	10–1	9–3	8–4–1	7–5–1	6–6	9–3
Boston	2–10	—	4–7	7–5	5–7	6–6	9–3–1	8–4	5–7	7–5	9–3	9–3–1
Brooklyn	5–7	7–4	—	6–6	5–7	2–10	11–1	9–3–1	5–7–1	7–5–1	9–3	5–7
Chicago	4–8	5–7	6–6	—	5–7	6–5	9–3–1	4–8	6–6	8–4	10–2	9–2–2
Cincinnati	4–8	7–5	7–5	7–5	—	6–6	6–6	4–8	4–8	4–8–1	9–3–1	8–2
Cleveland	6–5	6–6	10–2	5–6	6–6	—	10–2	7–5	7–5	7–5	11–1–2	9–3
Louisville	1–10	3–9–1	1–11	3–9–1	6–6	2–10	—	3–9	2–10	2–10	6–6	6–6
New York	3–9	4–8	3–9–1	8–4	8–4	5–7	9–3	—	3–8	4–8	11–1	8–4
Philadelphia	4–8–1	7–5	7–5–1	6–6	8–4	5–7	10–2	8–3	—	8–4	7–5	8–4
Pittsburgh	5–7–1	5–7	5–7–1	4–8	8–4–1	5–7	10–2	8–4	4–8	—	9–3	8–4
St. Louis	6–6	3–9	3–9	2–10	3–9–1	1–11–2	6–6	1–11	5–7	3–9	—	6–5–2
Washington	3–9	3–9–1	7–5	2–9–2	2–8	3–9	6–6	4–8	4–8	4–8	5–6–2	—

=== Roster ===
1895 Philadelphia Phillies
Roster
Pitchers: Ernie Beam; Kid Carsey; George Hodson; Henry Lampe; Con Lucid; Willie McGill; Al Orth; Tom Smith; Jack Taylor; Gus Weyhing; Deke White	Catchers: Dick Buckley; Jack Clements; Mike Grady; Infielders: Jack Boyle; Lave Cross; Bill Hallman; Art Madison; Charlie Reilly; Joe Sullivan	Outfielders: Ed Delahanty; Billy Hamilton; Sam Thompson; Tuck Turner	Manager: Arthur Irwin

== Player stats ==
=== Batting ===
==== Starters by position ====
Note: Pos = Position; G = Games played; AB = At bats; H = Hits; Avg. = Batting average; HR = Home runs; RBI = Runs batted in

Pos	Player	G	AB	H	Avg.	HR	RBI
C	Jack Clements	88	322	127	.394	13	75
1B	Jack Boyle	133	565	143	.253	0	67
2B	Bill Hallman	124	539	169	.314	1	91
SS	Joe Sullivan	94	373	126	.338	2	50
3B	Lave Cross	125	535	145	.271	2	101
OF	Ed Delahanty	116	480	194	.404	11	106
OF	Sam Thompson	119	538	211	.392	18	165
OF	Billy Hamilton	123	517	201	.389	7	74

==== Other batters ====
Note: G = Games played; AB = At bats; H = Hits; Avg. = Batting average; HR = Home runs; RBI = Runs batted in

Player	G	AB	H	Avg.	HR	RBI
Tuck Turner	59	210	81	.386	2	43
Charlie Reilly	49	179	48	.268	0	25
Mike Grady	46	123	40	.325	1	23
Dick Buckley	38	112	28	.250	0	14
Art Madison	11	34	12	.353	0	8

=== Pitching ===
==== Starting pitchers ====
Note: G = Games pitched; IP = Innings pitched; W = Wins; L = Losses; ERA = Earned run average; SO = Strikeouts

Player	G	IP	W	L	ERA	SO
Kid Carsey	44	342.1	24	16	4.92	64
Jack Taylor	41	335.0	26	14	4.49	93
Willie McGill	20	146.0	10	8	5.55	70
Al Orth	11	88.0	8	1	3.89	25
Con Lucid	10	69.2	6	3	5.94	19
Gus Weyhing	2	9.0	0	2	20.00	5

==== Other pitchers ====
Note: G = Games pitched; IP = Innings pitched; W = Wins; L = Losses; ERA = Earned run average; SO = Strikeouts

Player	G	IP	W	L	ERA	SO
Tom Smith	11	68.0	2	3	6.88	21
Henry Lampe	7	44.0	0	2	7.57	18
Deke White	3	17.1	1	0	9.87	6
George Hodson	4	17.0	1	2	9.53	6

==== Relief pitchers ====
Note: G = Games pitched; W = Wins; L = Losses; SV = Saves; ERA = Earned run average; SO = Strikeouts

Player	G	W	L	SV	ERA	SO
Ernie Beam	9	0	2	3	11.31	3
