= Bill Childress =

American baseball player

- Pitcher
- Born: 1867; Tennessee
- Died: December 30, 1940 (aged 72–73); St. Louis, Missouri
- Batted: Unknown Threw: Unknown

MLB debut
- July 27, 1895, for the Louisville Colonels

Last MLB appearance
- July 27, 1895, for the Louisville Colonels

MLB statistics
- Win–loss record: 0-0
- Earned run average: INF
- Strikeouts: 0
- Stats at Baseball Reference

Teams
- Louisville Colonels (1895)

William M. Childress (1867–1940) was an American professional baseball pitcher who pitched in one game for the Louisville Colonels of the National League on July 27, 1895. He allowed two hits, walked five, threw three wild pitches, and allowed six runs to score (all earned) without recording an out. As this was his only major league appearance, he is credited with an infinite career earned run average (ERA), and is the first such player who exclusively played as a pitcher. Childress is tied with Doc Hamann for the most earned runs allowed (6) and most batters faced (7) without recording an out. Like Childress, Hamann was a pitcher who appeared in only one career game, playing for the Cleveland Indians in 1922.
