= 1895 St. Louis Browns season =

Major League Baseball season

1895 St. Louis Browns
- League: National League
- Ballpark: New Sportsman's Park
- City: St. Louis, Missouri
- Record: 39–92 (.298)
- League place: 11th
- Owners: Chris von der Ahe
- Managers: Al Buckenberger (16–34); Chris von der Ahe (1–0); Joe Quinn (11–28); Lou Phelan (11–30)
- Stats: ESPN.com; Baseball Reference

The 1895 St. Louis Browns season was the team's 14th season in St. Louis, Missouri and the fourth season in the National League. The Browns went 39–92 during the season and finished 11th in the National League.

== Regular season ==
=== Season standings ===
National League
Team	W	L	Pct.	GB	Home	Road
Baltimore Orioles	87	43	.669	—	54‍–‍12	33‍–‍31
Cleveland Spiders	84	46	.646	3	49‍–‍13	35‍–‍33
Philadelphia Phillies	78	53	.595	9½	51‍–‍21	27‍–‍32
Chicago Colts	72	58	.554	15	43‍–‍24	29‍–‍34
Brooklyn Grooms	71	60	.542	16½	43‍–‍22	28‍–‍38
Boston Beaneaters	71	60	.542	16½	48‍–‍19	23‍–‍41
Pittsburgh Pirates	71	61	.538	17	44‍–‍21	27‍–‍40
Cincinnati Reds	66	64	.508	21	42‍–‍22	24‍–‍42
New York Giants	66	65	.504	21½	40‍–‍27	26‍–‍38
Washington Senators	43	85	.336	43	31‍–‍34	12‍–‍51
St. Louis Browns	39	92	.298	48½	25‍–‍41	14‍–‍51
Louisville Colonels	35	96	.267	52½	19‍–‍38	16‍–‍58

=== Record vs. opponents ===
1895 National League record Sources:
Team	BAL	BSN	BRO	CHI	CIN	CLE	LOU	NYG	PHI	PIT	STL	WAS
Baltimore	—	10–2	7–5	8–4	8–4	5–6	10–1	9–3	8–4–1	7–5–1	6–6	9–3
Boston	2–10	—	4–7	7–5	5–7	6–6	9–3–1	8–4	5–7	7–5	9–3	9–3–1
Brooklyn	5–7	7–4	—	6–6	5–7	2–10	11–1	9–3–1	5–7–1	7–5–1	9–3	5–7
Chicago	4–8	5–7	6–6	—	5–7	6–5	9–3–1	4–8	6–6	8–4	10–2	9–2–2
Cincinnati	4–8	7–5	7–5	7–5	—	6–6	6–6	4–8	4–8	4–8–1	9–3–1	8–2
Cleveland	6–5	6–6	10–2	5–6	6–6	—	10–2	7–5	7–5	7–5	11–1–2	9–3
Louisville	1–10	3–9–1	1–11	3–9–1	6–6	2–10	—	3–9	2–10	2–10	6–6	6–6
New York	3–9	4–8	3–9–1	8–4	8–4	5–7	9–3	—	3–8	4–8	11–1	8–4
Philadelphia	4–8–1	7–5	7–5–1	6–6	8–4	5–7	10–2	8–3	—	8–4	7–5	8–4
Pittsburgh	5–7–1	5–7	5–7–1	4–8	8–4–1	5–7	10–2	8–4	4–8	—	9–3	8–4
St. Louis	6–6	3–9	3–9	2–10	3–9–1	1–11–2	6–6	1–11	5–7	3–9	—	6–5–2
Washington	3–9	3–9–1	7–5	2–9–2	2–8	3–9	6–6	4–8	4–8	4–8	5–6–2	—

=== Roster ===
1895 St. Louis Browns
Roster
Pitchers: Ted Breitenstein; Dad Clarkson; Walter Coleman; Red Donahue; Red Ehret; Bill Kissinger; Dewey McDougal; Harry Staley	Catchers: Joe Fagin; John Otten; Heinie Peitz; Infielders: Frank Bonner; Joe Connor; Roger Connor; Bones Ely; Billy Kinloch; Denny Lyons; Guy McFadden; Doggie Miller; Joe Quinn; Mike Ryan; Ike Samuels	Outfielders: Harry Atkinson; Tom Brown; Duff Cooley; Tommy Dowd; Marty Hogan; Biff Sheehan	Manager: Al Buckenberger; Lou Phelan; Joe Quinn; Chris von der Ahe

== Player stats ==
=== Batting ===
==== Starters by position ====
Note: Pos = Position; G = Games played; AB = At bats; H = Hits; Avg. = Batting average; HR = Home runs; RBI = Runs batted in

Pos	Player	G	AB	H	Avg.	HR	RBI
C	Heinie Peitz	90	334	95	.284	2	65
1B	Roger Connor	104	401	131	.327	8	78
2B	Joe Quinn	134	543	169	.311	2	74
SS	Bones Ely	118	471	122	.259	1	47
3B	Doggie Miller	122	494	144	.291	5	74
OF	Tom Brown	84	355	78	.220	1	31
OF	Duff Cooley	133	567	194	.342	7	75
OF	Tommy Dowd	130	508	164	.323	7	74

==== Other batters ====
Note: G = Games played; AB = At bats; H = Hits; Avg. = Batting average; HR = Home runs; RBI = Runs batted in

Player	G	AB	H	Avg.	HR	RBI
Biff Sheehan	52	180	57	.317	1	18
Denny Lyons	34	132	39	.295	2	25
John Otten	26	87	21	.241	0	8
Ike Samuels	24	74	17	.230	0	5
Frank Bonner	15	59	8	.136	1	8
Marty Hogan	5	18	3	.167	0	2
Guy McFadden	4	14	3	.214	0	2
Joe Connor	2	7	0	.000	0	1
Harry Atkinson	1	5	2	.400	0	0
Joe Fagin	1	3	1	.333	0	2
Billy Kinloch	1	3	1	.333	0	0
Mike Ryan	2	2	0	.000	0	0

=== Pitching ===
==== Starting pitchers ====
Note: G = Games pitched; IP = Innings pitched; W = Wins; L = Losses; ERA = Earned run average; SO = Strikeouts

Player	G	IP	W	L	ERA	SO
Ted Breitenstein	54	429.2	19	30	4.44	127
Red Ehret	37	231.2	6	19	6.02	55
Harry Staley	23	158.2	6	13	5.22	28
Bill Kissinger	24	140.2	4	12	6.72	31
Dewey McDougal	18	114.2	3	10	8.32	23
Dad Clarkson	7	61.0	1	6	7.38	9
Red Donahue	1	8.0	0	1	6.75	2
Walter Coleman	1	8.0	0	1	13.50	5
