= Dick Hunt (baseball) =

American baseball player (1847–1895)

- Right fielder
- Born: c. 1847; New York City, U.S.
- Died: November 20, 1895 (aged 47–48); New York, New York, U.S.
- Batted: Unknown Threw: Unknown

MLB debut
- May 7, 1872, for the Brooklyn Eckfords

Last MLB appearance
- July 9, 1872, for the Brooklyn Eckfords

MLB statistics
- Games played: 11
- Runs scored: 10
- Hits: 15
- Batting average: .326
- Stats at Baseball Reference

Teams
- National Association of Base Ball Players New York Mutuals (1866–1869) Star of Brooklyn (1869) Brooklyn Eckfords (1870) National Association of Professional BBP Brooklyn Eckfords (1872)

Richard M. Hunt (c. 1847 – November 20, 1895) was an American professional baseball player in the late 1860s to early 1870s who played mainly right field for the 1872 Brooklyn Eckfords of the National Association. In 11 career games played, he scored 10 runs, and collected 15 hits in 46 at bats for a .326 batting average. Hunt died in New York City on November 20, 1895, and is interred at Green-Wood Cemetery in Brooklyn, New York.
