= 1895 Brooklyn Grooms season =

1895 Brooklyn Grooms
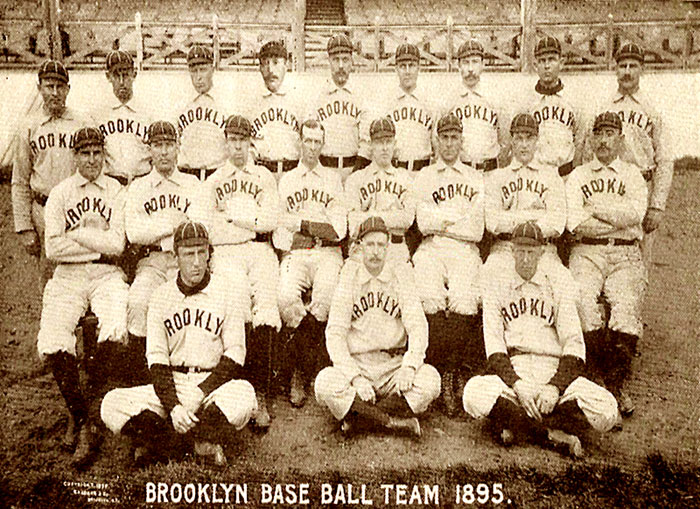
- League: National League
- Ballpark: Eastern Park
- City: Brooklyn, New York
- Record: 71–60 (.542)
- League place: T–5th
- Owners: Charles Byrne, Ferdinand Abell, George Chauncey
- President: Charles Byrne
- Managers: Dave Foutz

The 1895 Brooklyn Grooms finished the season in fifth place in the National League.

== Offseason ==
- January 26, 1895: Tom Kinslow was traded by the Grooms to the Pittsburgh Pirates for Ad Gumbert.

== Regular season ==
=== Season standings ===
National League
Team	W	L	Pct.	GB	Home	Road
Baltimore Orioles	87	43	.669	—	54‍–‍12	33‍–‍31
Cleveland Spiders	84	46	.646	3	49‍–‍13	35‍–‍33
Philadelphia Phillies	78	53	.595	9½	51‍–‍21	27‍–‍32
Chicago Colts	72	58	.554	15	43‍–‍24	29‍–‍34
Brooklyn Grooms	71	60	.542	16½	43‍–‍22	28‍–‍38
Boston Beaneaters	71	60	.542	16½	48‍–‍19	23‍–‍41
Pittsburgh Pirates	71	61	.538	17	44‍–‍21	27‍–‍40
Cincinnati Reds	66	64	.508	21	42‍–‍22	24‍–‍42
New York Giants	66	65	.504	21½	40‍–‍27	26‍–‍38
Washington Senators	43	85	.336	43	31‍–‍34	12‍–‍51
St. Louis Browns	39	92	.298	48½	25‍–‍41	14‍–‍51
Louisville Colonels	35	96	.267	52½	19‍–‍38	16‍–‍58

=== Record vs. opponents ===
1895 National League record Sources:
Team	BAL	BSN	BRO	CHI	CIN	CLE	LOU	NYG	PHI	PIT	STL	WAS
Baltimore	—	10–2	7–5	8–4	8–4	5–6	10–1	9–3	8–4–1	7–5–1	6–6	9–3
Boston	2–10	—	4–7	7–5	5–7	6–6	9–3–1	8–4	5–7	7–5	9–3	9–3–1
Brooklyn	5–7	7–4	—	6–6	5–7	2–10	11–1	9–3–1	5–7–1	7–5–1	9–3	5–7
Chicago	4–8	5–7	6–6	—	5–7	6–5	9–3–1	4–8	6–6	8–4	10–2	9–2–2
Cincinnati	4–8	7–5	7–5	7–5	—	6–6	6–6	4–8	4–8	4–8–1	9–3–1	8–2
Cleveland	6–5	6–6	10–2	5–6	6–6	—	10–2	7–5	7–5	7–5	11–1–2	9–3
Louisville	1–10	3–9–1	1–11	3–9–1	6–6	2–10	—	3–9	2–10	2–10	6–6	6–6
New York	3–9	4–8	3–9–1	8–4	8–4	5–7	9–3	—	3–8	4–8	11–1	8–4
Philadelphia	4–8–1	7–5	7–5–1	6–6	8–4	5–7	10–2	8–3	—	8–4	7–5	8–4
Pittsburgh	5–7–1	5–7	5–7–1	4–8	8–4–1	5–7	10–2	8–4	4–8	—	9–3	8–4
St. Louis	6–6	3–9	3–9	2–10	3–9–1	1–11–2	6–6	1–11	5–7	3–9	—	6–5–2
Washington	3–9	3–9–1	7–5	2–9–2	2–8	3–9	6–6	4–8	4–8	4–8	5–6–2	—

=== Roster ===
1895 Brooklyn Grooms
Roster
Pitchers: Bert Abbey; Jack Cronin; Dan Daub; Ad Gumbert; Brickyard Kennedy; Con Lucid; Sandy McDougal; Ed Stein	Catchers: Buster Burrell; Con Daily; John Grim; Infielders: Tommy Corcoran; Tom Daly; Candy LaChance; Joe Mulvey; Billy Shindle	Outfielders: John Anderson; Oyster Burns; Dave Foutz; Mike Griffin; Hunkey Hines; George Shoch; George Treadway	Manager: Dave Foutz

== Player stats ==
=== Batting ===
==== Starters by position ====
Note: Pos = Position; G = Games played; AB = At bats; R = Runs; H = Hits; Avg. = Batting average; HR = Home runs; RBI = Runs batted in; SB = Stolen bases

Pos	Player	G	AB	R	H	Avg.	HR	RBI	SB
C	John Grim	93	329	54	92	.280	0	44	9
1B	Candy LaChance	127	536	99	167	.312	8	108	37
2B	Tom Daly	120	455	89	128	.281	2	68	28
3B	Billy Shindle	116	477	91	133	.279	3	69	17
SS	Tommy Corcoran	127	535	81	142	.265	2	69	17
OF	Mike Griffin	131	519	140	173	.333	4	65	27
OF	John Anderson	102	419	76	120	.286	9	87	24
OF	George Treadway	86	339	54	87	.257	7	54	9

==== Other batters ====
Note: G = Games played; AB = At bats; R = Runs; H = Hits; Avg. = Batting average; HR = Home runs; RBI = Runs batted in; SB = Stolen bases

Player	G	AB	R	H	Avg.	HR	RBI	SB
George Shoch	61	216	49	56	.259	0	29	7
Con Daily	40	142	17	30	.211	1	11	3
Dave Foutz	31	115	14	34	.296	0	21	1
Oyster Burns	20	76	7	14	.184	0	7	0
Joe Mulvey	13	49	8	15	.306	0	8	1
Buster Burrell	12	28	7	4	.143	1	5	0
Hunkey Hines	2	8	3	2	.250	0	1	0

=== Pitching ===
==== Starting pitchers ====
Note: G = Games pitched; IP = Innings pitched; W = Wins; L = Losses; ERA = Earned run average; BB = Bases on balls; SO = Strikeouts; CG = Complete games

Player	G	GS	IP	W	L	ERA	BB	SO	CG
Brickyard Kennedy	39	33	279.2	19	12	5.12	93	39	26
Ed Stein	32	27	255.1	15	13	4.72	93	55	24
Ad Gumbert	33	26	234.0	11	16	5.08	69	45	20
Dan Daub	25	21	184.2	10	10	4.29	51	36	16
Con Lucid	21	19	137.0	10	7	5.52	72	24	12
Bert Abbey	8	6	52.0	5	2	4.33	9	14	5

==== Relief pitchers ====
Note: G = Games pitched; IP = Innings pitched; W = Wins; L = Losses; SV = Saves; ERA = Earned run average; BB = Bases on balls; SO = Strikeouts

Player	G	IP	W	L	SV	ERA	BB	SO
Jack Cronin	2	5.0	0	0	2	10.80	3	1
Sandy McDougal	1	3.0	0	0	1	12.00	5	2
