= Jim McLaughlin (pitcher/outfielder) =

American baseball player (1860–1895)

- Pitcher / Outfielder
- Born: November 18, 1860; Cleveland, Ohio, U.S.
- Died: November 16, 1895 (aged 34); Cleveland, Ohio, U.S.
- Batted: Left Threw: Left

MLB debut
- May 30, 1884, for the Baltimore Orioles

Last MLB appearance
- July 15, 1884, for the Baltimore Orioles

MLB statistics
- Win–loss record: 1-2
- Earned run average: 3.68
- Strikeouts: 8
- Stats at Baseball Reference

Teams
- Baltimore Orioles (1884))

James Thomas McLaughlin (November 18, 1860 – November 16, 1895) was an American professional baseball player. He played part of the 1884 season in Major League Baseball Baltimore Orioles, appearing in three games as a pitcher and three as an outfielder.
