= Oscar Purner =

American baseball player (1872–1915)

- Pitcher
- Born: December 9, 1873; Washington, D.C.
- Died: December 4, 1915 (aged 41); Douglas, Arizona
- Batted: Unknown Threw: Unknown

MLB debut
- September 2, 1895, for the Washington Senators

Last MLB appearance
- September 2, 1895, for the Washington Senators

MLB statistics
- Win–loss record: 0-0
- Earned run average: 9.00
- Strikeouts: 0

Teams
- Washington Senators (1895)

Oscar E. Purner (December 9, 1872 – December 4, 1915) was a 19th-century Major League Baseball player. He played for the Washington Senators of the National League during the 1895 baseball season. He pitched two innings in one game for the Senators on September 2, 1895, allowing two earned runs.
