= Zeke Wilson =

American baseball player (1869–1928)

- Pitcher
- Born: December 24, 1869; Benton, Alabama, U.S.
- Died: April 26, 1928 (aged 58); Montgomery, Alabama, U.S.
- Batted: Right Threw: Right

MLB debut
- April 23, 1895, for the Boston Beaneaters

Last MLB appearance
- June 28, 1899, for the St. Louis Perfectos

MLB statistics
- Win–loss record: 52–44
- Earned run average: 4.03
- Strikeouts: 198
- Stats at Baseball Reference

Teams
- Boston Beaneaters (1895); Cleveland Spiders (1895–1898); St. Louis Perfectos (1899)

Frank Ealton "Zeke" Wilson (December 24, 1869 – April 26, 1928) was an American professional baseball pitcher. He played five seasons in Major League Baseball from 1895 to 1899, for the Boston Beaneaters, Cleveland Spiders and St. Louis Perfectos.
