= Eddie Burke (baseball) =

American baseball player (1866–1907)

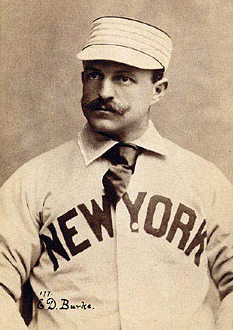
- Outfielder
- Born: October 6, 1866; Northumberland, Pennsylvania, U.S.
- Died: November 26, 1907 (aged 41); Utica, New York, U.S.
- Batted: Both Threw: Right

MLB debut
- April 19, 1890, for the Philadelphia Phillies

Last MLB appearance
- September 19, 1897, for the Cincinnati Reds

MLB statistics
- Batting average: .280
- Home runs: 30
- Runs batted in: 413
- Stats at Baseball Reference

Teams
- Philadelphia Phillies (1890); Pittsburgh Alleghenys (1890); Milwaukee Brewers (1891); Cincinnati Reds (1892); New York Giants (1892–1895); Cincinnati Reds (1895–1897)

Edward D. Burke (October 6, 1866 – November 26, 1907) was an American Major League Baseball outfielder. He played all or part of eight seasons, from 1890 until 1897. During that time, he played for five teams: the Philadelphia Phillies, Pittsburgh Alleghenys, Milwaukee Brewers, Cincinnati Reds, and New York Giants.

== Formative years ==
Born in Northumberland County, Pennsylvania, on October 6, 1866, Burke spent many of his formative years playing baseball on a ballfield that was located on the north side of the polo grounds in that county.

== Baseball career ==
In 1890, Burke was traded in midseason along with pitcher Bill Day for Billy Sunday. This is the only recorded time the famed evangelist was traded during his baseball career.

In 855 games over eight seasons, Burke posted a .280 batting average (983-for-3516) with 747 runs, 30 home runs, 413 RBIs, 293 stolen bases and 319 bases on balls.

== See also ==
- List of Major League Baseball career stolen bases leaders
