= 1895 Chicago Colts season =

1895 Chicago Colts
- League: National League
- Ballpark: West Side Park
- City: Chicago
- Record: 72–58 (.554)
- League place: 4th
- Owners: Albert Spalding
- Managers: Cap Anson

The 1895 Chicago Colts season was the 24th season of the Chicago Colts franchise, the 20th in the National League and the third at West Side Park. The Colts finished fourth in the National League with a record of 72–58.

== Regular season ==
=== Season standings ===
National League
Team	W	L	Pct.	GB	Home	Road
Baltimore Orioles	87	43	.669	—	54‍–‍12	33‍–‍31
Cleveland Spiders	84	46	.646	3	49‍–‍13	35‍–‍33
Philadelphia Phillies	78	53	.595	9½	51‍–‍21	27‍–‍32
Chicago Colts	72	58	.554	15	43‍–‍24	29‍–‍34
Brooklyn Grooms	71	60	.542	16½	43‍–‍22	28‍–‍38
Boston Beaneaters	71	60	.542	16½	48‍–‍19	23‍–‍41
Pittsburgh Pirates	71	61	.538	17	44‍–‍21	27‍–‍40
Cincinnati Reds	66	64	.508	21	42‍–‍22	24‍–‍42
New York Giants	66	65	.504	21½	40‍–‍27	26‍–‍38
Washington Senators	43	85	.336	43	31‍–‍34	12‍–‍51
St. Louis Browns	39	92	.298	48½	25‍–‍41	14‍–‍51
Louisville Colonels	35	96	.267	52½	19‍–‍38	16‍–‍58

=== Record vs. opponents ===
1895 National League record Sources:
Team	BAL	BSN	BRO	CHI	CIN	CLE	LOU	NYG	PHI	PIT	STL	WAS
Baltimore	—	10–2	7–5	8–4	8–4	5–6	10–1	9–3	8–4–1	7–5–1	6–6	9–3
Boston	2–10	—	4–7	7–5	5–7	6–6	9–3–1	8–4	5–7	7–5	9–3	9–3–1
Brooklyn	5–7	7–4	—	6–6	5–7	2–10	11–1	9–3–1	5–7–1	7–5–1	9–3	5–7
Chicago	4–8	5–7	6–6	—	5–7	6–5	9–3–1	4–8	6–6	8–4	10–2	9–2–2
Cincinnati	4–8	7–5	7–5	7–5	—	6–6	6–6	4–8	4–8	4–8–1	9–3–1	8–2
Cleveland	6–5	6–6	10–2	5–6	6–6	—	10–2	7–5	7–5	7–5	11–1–2	9–3
Louisville	1–10	3–9–1	1–11	3–9–1	6–6	2–10	—	3–9	2–10	2–10	6–6	6–6
New York	3–9	4–8	3–9–1	8–4	8–4	5–7	9–3	—	3–8	4–8	11–1	8–4
Philadelphia	4–8–1	7–5	7–5–1	6–6	8–4	5–7	10–2	8–3	—	8–4	7–5	8–4
Pittsburgh	5–7–1	5–7	5–7–1	4–8	8–4–1	5–7	10–2	8–4	4–8	—	9–3	8–4
St. Louis	6–6	3–9	3–9	2–10	3–9–1	1–11–2	6–6	1–11	5–7	3–9	—	6–5–2
Washington	3–9	3–9–1	7–5	2–9–2	2–8	3–9	6–6	4–8	4–8	4–8	5–6–2	—

== Roster ==
1895 Chicago Colts
Roster
Pitchers: Bert Abbey; John Dolan; Danny Friend; Clark Griffith; Bill Hutchison; Monte McFarland; Doc Parker; Scott Stratton; Adonis Terry; Walter Thornton	Catchers: Tim Donahue; Malachi Kittridge; Bill Moran; Infielders: Cap Anson; Bill Dahlen; Bill Everitt; Charlie Irwin; Ace Stewart; Harry Truby	Outfielders: George Decker; Bill Lange; Jiggs Parrott; Jimmy Ryan; Walt Wilmot	Manager: Cap Anson

== Player stats ==
=== Batting ===
==== Starters by position ====
Note: Pos = Position; G = Games played; AB = At bats; H = Hits; Avg. = Batting average; HR = Home runs; RBI = Runs batted in

Pos	Player	G	AB	H	Avg.	HR	RBI
C	Tim Donohue	63	219	59	.269	2	36
1B	Cap Anson	122	474	159	.335	2	91
2B	Ace Stewart	97	365	88	.241	8	76
SS	Bill Dahlen	129	516	131	.254	7	62
3B	Bill Everitt	133	550	197	.358	3	88
OF	Walt Wilmot	108	466	132	.283	8	72
OF	Jimmy Ryan	108	438	139	.317	6	49
OF	Bill Lange	123	478	186	.389	10	98

==== Other batters ====
Note: G = Games played; AB = At bats; H = Hits; Avg. = Batting average; HR = Home runs; RBI = Runs batted in

Player	G	AB	H	Avg.	HR	RBI
George Decker	73	297	82	.276	2	41
Malachi Kittridge	60	212	48	.226	3	29
Harry Truby	33	119	40	.336	0	16
Bill Moran	15	55	9	.164	1	9
Charlie Irwin	3	10	2	.200	0	0
Jiggs Parrott	3	4	1	.250	0	0

=== Pitching ===
==== Starting pitchers ====
Note: G = Games pitched; IP = Innings pitched; W = Wins; L = Losses; ERA = Earned run average; SO = Strikeouts

Player	G	IP	W	L	ERA	SO
Clark Griffith	42	353.0	26	14	3.93	79
Adonis Terry	38	311.1	21	14	4.80	88
Bill Hutchison	38	291.0	13	21	4.73	85
Doc Parker	7	51.1	4	2	3.68	9
Danny Friend	5	41.0	2	2	5.27	10
Scott Stratton	5	30.0	2	3	9.60	4
Monte McFarland	2	14.0	2	0	5.14	5
John Dolan	2	11.0	0	1	6.55	1
Bert Abbey	1	8.0	0	1	4.50	3

==== Other pitchers ====
Note: G = Games pitched; IP = Innings pitched; W = Wins; L = Losses; ERA = Earned run average; SO = Strikeouts

Player	G	IP	W	L	ERA	SO
Walter Thornton	7	40.0	2	0	6.08	13
