= Oscar Woehrlin =

American baseball player (1871–1934)

- Shortstop
- Born: December 12, 1871; St. Louis, Missouri
- Died: March 7, 1934 (aged 62); St. Louis, Missouri
- Batted: Unknown Threw: Unknown

MLB debut
- July 21, 1895, for the Washington Senators

Last MLB appearance
- July 21, 1895, for the Washington Senators

MLB statistics
- Batting average: .333
- Runs scored: 1
- Sacrifice hits: 1
- Stats at Baseball Reference

Teams
- Washington Senators (1895)

Oscar J. Woehrlin (December 12, 1871 - March 7, 1934) was a professional baseball player. He appeared in one game in Major League Baseball in 1895 for the Washington Senators as a shortstop.

He was initially identified as Joe Woerlin until research in 2016 gave Joe's playing record to Oscar.

Woehrlin died in 1934 in his home town of St. Louis, Missouri of prostate cancer.
