= Jack Warner (catcher) =

American baseball catcher (1872–1943)

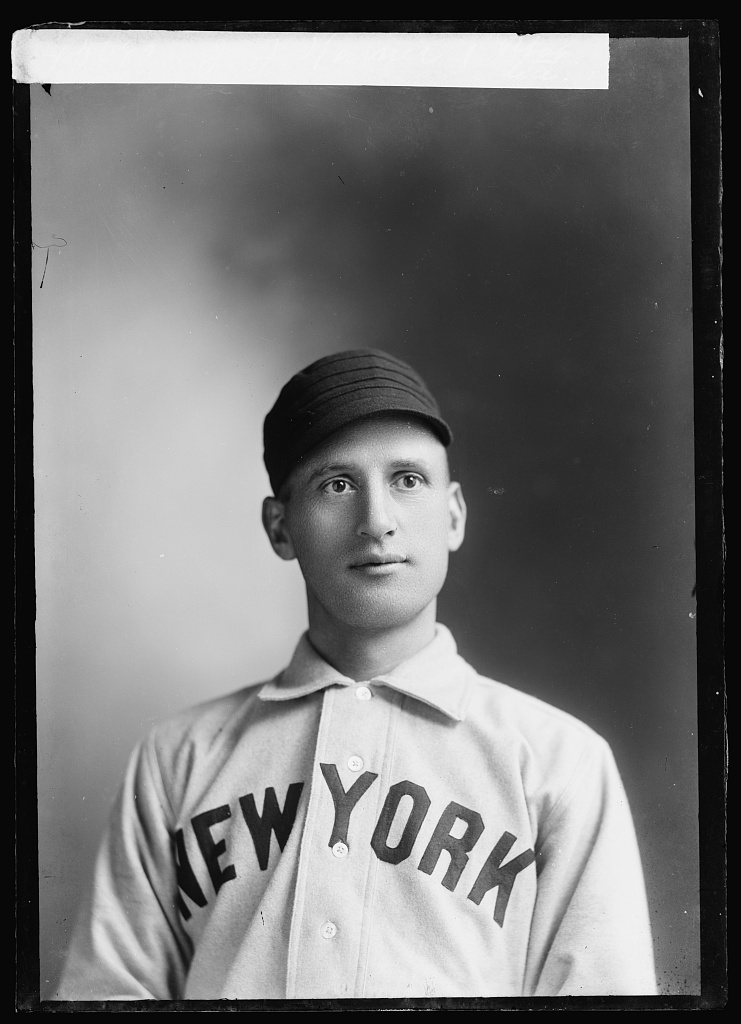
- Warner in a New York Giants uniform
- Catcher
- Born: August 15, 1872; New York, New York, U.S.
- Died: December 21, 1943 (aged 71); Far Rockaway, New York, U.S.
- Batted: Left Threw: Right

MLB debut
- April 23, 1895, for the Boston Beaneaters

Last MLB appearance
- September 30, 1908, for the Washington Senators

MLB statistics
- Batting average: .249
- Home runs: 6
- Runs batted in: 302
- Stats at Baseball Reference

Teams
- Boston Beaneaters (1895); Louisville Colonels (1895–1896); New York Giants (1896–1901); Boston Americans (1902); New York Giants (1903–1904); St. Louis Cardinals (1905); Detroit Tigers (1905–1906); Washington Senators (1906–1908)

John Joseph Warner (August 15, 1872 – December 21, 1943) was an American professional baseball catcher who played in Major League Baseball from 1895 through 1908. He played for the Boston Beaneaters, Louisville Colonels, New York Giants, Boston Americans, St. Louis Cardinals, Detroit Tigers and Washington Senators.

In 1906, Warner was part of the first season-long platoon arrangement in baseball, sharing time at catcher with Fred Payne and Boss Schmidt.

In 1,074 major league games, Warner had a .249 batting average and .303 on-base percentage. He had 870 hits, 348 runs scored, 302 RBIs, 122 extra base hits, and 83 stolen bases. Warner was among the league leaders in being hit by a pitch 3 times and ranks 123 all-time with 91 times hit by a pitch. Warner was born in New York City and died in Far Rockaway, New York.
