= Joe Fagin (baseball) =

American baseball player

- Catcher
- Born: Unknown; Cincinnati
- Died: Unknown
- Batted: Unknown Threw: Unknown

MLB debut
- June 25, 1895, for the St. Louis Browns

Last MLB appearance
- June 25, 1895, for the St. Louis Browns

MLB statistics
- Batting average: .333
- Home runs: 0
- Runs batted in: 2
- Stats at Baseball Reference

Teams
- St. Louis Browns (1895)

Joseph Fagin was a catcher for the St. Louis Browns of the National League in 1895.
