= 1895 Baltimore Orioles season =

1895 Baltimore Orioles
- 1895 National League champions
- League: National League
- Ballpark: Union Park
- City: Baltimore, Maryland
- Record: 87–43 (.669)
- League place: 1st
- Owners: Harry Von der Horst
- Managers: Ned Hanlon

The 1895 Baltimore Orioles season was a season in American baseball. The Orioles finished first in the National League, winning their second straight pennant. However, for the second straight year, they failed to win the Temple Cup, losing to the second-place Cleveland Spiders 4 games to 1.

== Regular season ==
=== Season standings ===
National League
Team	W	L	Pct.	GB	Home	Road
Baltimore Orioles	87	43	.669	—	54‍–‍12	33‍–‍31
Cleveland Spiders	84	46	.646	3	49‍–‍13	35‍–‍33
Philadelphia Phillies	78	53	.595	9½	51‍–‍21	27‍–‍32
Chicago Colts	72	58	.554	15	43‍–‍24	29‍–‍34
Brooklyn Grooms	71	60	.542	16½	43‍–‍22	28‍–‍38
Boston Beaneaters	71	60	.542	16½	48‍–‍19	23‍–‍41
Pittsburgh Pirates	71	61	.538	17	44‍–‍21	27‍–‍40
Cincinnati Reds	66	64	.508	21	42‍–‍22	24‍–‍42
New York Giants	66	65	.504	21½	40‍–‍27	26‍–‍38
Washington Senators	43	85	.336	43	31‍–‍34	12‍–‍51
St. Louis Browns	39	92	.298	48½	25‍–‍41	14‍–‍51
Louisville Colonels	35	96	.267	52½	19‍–‍38	16‍–‍58

=== Record vs. opponents ===
1895 National League record Sources:
Team	BAL	BSN	BRO	CHI	CIN	CLE	LOU	NYG	PHI	PIT	STL	WAS
Baltimore	—	10–2	7–5	8–4	8–4	5–6	10–1	9–3	8–4–1	7–5–1	6–6	9–3
Boston	2–10	—	4–7	7–5	5–7	6–6	9–3–1	8–4	5–7	7–5	9–3	9–3–1
Brooklyn	5–7	7–4	—	6–6	5–7	2–10	11–1	9–3–1	5–7–1	7–5–1	9–3	5–7
Chicago	4–8	5–7	6–6	—	5–7	6–5	9–3–1	4–8	6–6	8–4	10–2	9–2–2
Cincinnati	4–8	7–5	7–5	7–5	—	6–6	6–6	4–8	4–8	4–8–1	9–3–1	8–2
Cleveland	6–5	6–6	10–2	5–6	6–6	—	10–2	7–5	7–5	7–5	11–1–2	9–3
Louisville	1–10	3–9–1	1–11	3–9–1	6–6	2–10	—	3–9	2–10	2–10	6–6	6–6
New York	3–9	4–8	3–9–1	8–4	8–4	5–7	9–3	—	3–8	4–8	11–1	8–4
Philadelphia	4–8–1	7–5	7–5–1	6–6	8–4	5–7	10–2	8–3	—	8–4	7–5	8–4
Pittsburgh	5–7–1	5–7	5–7–1	4–8	8–4–1	5–7	10–2	8–4	4–8	—	9–3	8–4
St. Louis	6–6	3–9	3–9	2–10	3–9–1	1–11–2	6–6	1–11	5–7	3–9	—	6–5–2
Washington	3–9	3–9–1	7–5	2–9–2	2–8	3–9	6–6	4–8	4–8	4–8	5–6–2	—

=== Roster ===
1895 Baltimore Orioles
Roster
Pitchers: Dad Clarkson; Duke Esper; George Hemming; Bill Hoffer; Bill Kissinger; Sadie McMahon; Arlie Pond	Catchers: Frank Bowerman; Boileryard Clarke; Wilbert Robinson; Infielders: Frank Bonner; Dan Brouthers; Scoops Carey; Kid Gleason; Hughie Jennings; John McGraw; Heinie Reitz	Outfielders: Steve Brodie; Willie Keeler; Joe Kelley	Manager: Ned Hanlon

== Player stats ==
=== Batting ===
==== Starters by position ====
Note: Pos = Position; G = Games played; AB = At bats; H = Hits; Avg. = Batting average; HR = Home runs; RBI = Runs batted in

Pos	Player	G	AB	H	Avg.	HR	RBI
C	Wilbert Robinson	77	282	74	.262	0	48
1B	Scoops Carey	123	490	128	.261	1	75
2B	Kid Gleason	112	421	130	.309	0	74
SS	Hughie Jennings	131	529	204	.386	4	125
3B	John McGraw	96	388	143	.369	2	48
OF	Willie Keeler	131	565	213	.377	4	78
OF	Steve Brodie	131	528	184	.348	2	134
OF	Joe Kelley	131	518	189	.365	10	134

==== Other batters ====
Note: G = Games played; AB = At bats; H = Hits; Avg. = Batting average; HR = Home runs; RBI = Runs batted in

Player	G	AB	H	Avg.	HR	RBI
Heinie Reitz	71	245	72	.294	0	29
Boileryard Clarke	67	241	70	.290	0	35
Frank Bonner	11	42	14	.333	0	7
Dan Brouthers	5	23	6	.261	0	5
Frank Bowerman	1	1	0	.000	0	0

=== Pitching ===
==== Starting pitchers ====
Note: G = Games pitched; IP = Innings pitched; W = Wins; L = Losses; ERA = Earned run average; SO = Strikeouts

Player	G	IP	W	L	ERA	SO
Bill Hoffer	41	314.0	31	6	3.21	80
George Hemming	34	262.1	20	13	4.05	43
Duke Esper	34	218.1	10	12	3.92	39
Dad Clarkson	20	142.0	12	3	3.87	23
Sadie McMahon	15	122.1	10	4	2.94	37
Bill Kissinger	2	11.1	1	0	3.97	3

==== Other pitchers ====
Note: G = Games pitched; IP = Innings pitched; W = Wins; L = Losses; ERA = Earned run average; SO = Strikeouts

Player	G	IP	W	L	ERA	SO
Kid Gleason	9	50.1	2	4	6.97	6
Arlie Pond	6	13.2	0	1	5.93	13
