= Billy Rhines =

American baseball player (1869–1922)

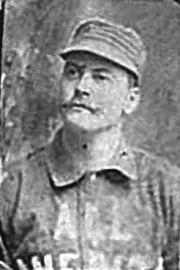
- Pitcher
- Born: March 14, 1869; Ridgway, Pennsylvania, U.S.
- Died: January 30, 1922 (aged 52); Ridgway, Pennsylvania, U.S.
- Batted: Right Threw: Right

MLB debut
- April 22, 1890, for the Cincinnati Reds

Last MLB appearance
- June 22, 1899, for the Pittsburgh Pirates

MLB statistics
- Win–loss record: 114–103
- Earned run average: 3.47
- Strikeouts: 555
- Stats at Baseball Reference

Teams
- Cincinnati Reds (1890–1892); Louisville Colonels (1893); Cincinnati Reds (1895–1897); Pittsburgh Pirates (1898–1899)

Career highlights and awards
- 2× NL ERA leader (1890, 1896)

William Pearl Rhines (March 14, 1869 – January 30, 1922) was an American professional baseball player during the nineteenth century. He led the National League in ERA twice (1890 and 1896) while playing for the Cincinnati Reds.

== Formative years ==
Rhines was born in Ridgway, Pennsylvania on March 14, 1869. He graduated from Bucknell University.

== Career ==
Rhines was a pitcher during parts of nine seasons (1890–1899) with the Cincinnati Reds, Louisville Colonels and Pittsburgh Pirates.

He led the National League in ERA twice (1890 and 1896) while playing for Cincinnati. For his career, he compiled a 114–103 record in 249 appearances, with a 3.47 ERA and 743 strikeouts.

== Death ==
Rhines died at the age of 52 in his hometown of Ridgway, Pennsylvania on January 30, 1922.
