= 1895 Major League Baseball season =

1895 MLB season
- League: National League (NL)
- Sport: Baseball
- Duration: Regular season: April 18 – September 30, 1895; Temple Cup: October 2–8, 1895
- Games: 132
- Teams: 12

Pennant winner
- NL champions: Baltimore Orioles
- NL runners-up: Cleveland Spiders

Temple Cup
- Venue: League Park, Cleveland, Ohio; Union Park, Baltimore, Maryland
- Champions: Cleveland Spiders
- Runners-up: Baltimore Orioles

MLB seasons
- ← 1894 1896 →

Locations of teams for the 1893–1895 National League seasons
National League

The 1895 major league baseball season began on April 18, 1895. The regular season ended on September 30, with the Baltimore Orioles as the pennant winner of the National League and the Cleveland Spiders as runner-up. The postseason began with Game 1 of the second Temple Cup on October 2 and ended with Game 5 on October 8. The Spiders defeated the Orioles, four games to one, capturing their first Temple Cup.

== Schedule ==
The 1895 schedule consisted of 132 games for the twelve teams of the National League. Each team was scheduled to play 12 games against the other eleven teams in the league. This continued the format put in place since 1893 and would be used until 1898.

Opening Day took place on April 18 featuring ten teams. The final day of the season was on September 30, featuring six teams. The Temple Cup took place between October 2 and October 8.

== Rule changes ==
The 1895 season saw the following rule changes:

- A held foul tip is now classified as a strike.
- The size of baseball bats were regulated to be at most 2¾ inches in diameter (an increase from 2½) and no longer than 42 inches.
- The infield fly rule is adopted, which is enforced when:
  - A fly ball is hit in the infield.
  - There is a force play at third base.
  - The infield fly rule shall be called by the umpire if they judge that the fly ball can be caught with ordinary effort.
- The pitcher's plate was enlarged from 12 inches by 4 inches, to 24 inches by 6 inches.
- Aside from catcher and first basemen's mitts and the size of gloves for all other position players were limited to 10 ounces and no more than 14 inches in circumference.
- Each incident of a player using indecent, obscene, or abusive language on the field resulted in a fine between $25 and $100 (equivalent to $968 and $3,870 in 2025), and that the money would be forwarded to Secretary Nicholas Young within five days or the player would be suspended until the fine was paid.
- A rule requiring umpires to "enforce the playing rules as written" was adopted, imposing a $25 fine on the respective umpire for the first such failure in a game, and doubling that to $50 for a second failure (equivalent to $968 and $1,935 in 2025, respectively).

== Teams ==
League	Team	City	Ballpark	Capacity	Manager
National League	Baltimore Orioles	Baltimore, Maryland	Union Park	6,500	Ned Hanlon
National League	Boston Beaneaters	Boston, Massachusetts	South End Grounds	6,600	Frank Selee
National League	Brooklyn Grooms	Brooklyn, New York	Eastern Park	12,000	Dave Foutz
National League	Chicago Colts	Chicago, Illinois	West Side Park	13,000	Cap Anson
National League	Cincinnati Reds	Cincinnati, Ohio	League Park (Cincinnati)	9,000	Buck Ewing
National League	Cleveland Spiders	Cleveland, Ohio	League Park (Cleveland)	9,000	Patsy Tebeau
National League	Louisville Colonels	Louisville, Kentucky	Eclipse Park	6,400	John McCloskey
National League	New York Giants	New York, New York	Polo Grounds	16,000	George Davis
National League	New York Giants	New York, New York	Polo Grounds	16,000	Jack Doyle
National League	New York Giants	New York, New York	Polo Grounds	16,000	Harvey Watkins
National League	Philadelphia Phillies	Philadelphia, Pennsylvania	National League Park	18,000	Arthur Irwin
National League	Pittsburgh Pirates	Allegheny, Pennsylvania	Exposition Park	6,500	Connie Mack
National League	St. Louis Browns	St. Louis, Missouri	New Sportsman's Park	14,500	Al Buckenberger
National League	St. Louis Browns	St. Louis, Missouri	New Sportsman's Park	14,500	Chris von der Ahe
National League	St. Louis Browns	St. Louis, Missouri	New Sportsman's Park	14,500	Joe Quinn
National League	St. Louis Browns	St. Louis, Missouri	New Sportsman's Park	14,500	Lou Phelan
National League	Washington Senators	Washington, D.C.	Boundary Field	6,500	Gus Schmelz

1. In today's New York, New York.
2. In today's Pittsburgh, Pennsylvania.

== Standings ==
=== National League ===
National League
Team	W	L	Pct.	GB	Home	Road
Baltimore Orioles	87	43	.669	—	54‍–‍12	33‍–‍31
Cleveland Spiders	84	46	.646	3	49‍–‍13	35‍–‍33
Philadelphia Phillies	78	53	.595	9½	51‍–‍21	27‍–‍32
Chicago Colts	72	58	.554	15	43‍–‍24	29‍–‍34
Brooklyn Grooms	71	60	.542	16½	43‍–‍22	28‍–‍38
Boston Beaneaters	71	60	.542	16½	48‍–‍19	23‍–‍41
Pittsburgh Pirates	71	61	.538	17	44‍–‍21	27‍–‍40
Cincinnati Reds	66	64	.508	21	42‍–‍22	24‍–‍42
New York Giants	66	65	.504	21½	40‍–‍27	26‍–‍38
Washington Senators	43	85	.336	43	31‍–‍34	12‍–‍51
St. Louis Browns	39	92	.298	48½	25‍–‍41	14‍–‍51
Louisville Colonels	35	96	.267	52½	19‍–‍38	16‍–‍58

=== Tie games ===
16 tie games, which are not factored into winning percentage or games behind (and were often replayed again), occurred throughout the season.

- Baltimore Orioles, 2
- Boston Beaneaters, 2
- Brooklyn Grooms, 3
- Chicago Colts, 3
- Cincinnati Reds, 2
- Cleveland Spiders, 2
- Louisville Colonels, 2
- New York Giants, 1
- Philadelphia Phillies, 2
- Pittsburgh Pirates, 3
- St. Louis Browns, 5
- Washington Senators, 5

== Postseason ==
=== Bracket ===
Temple Cup
NL1	Baltimore Orioles	4	2	1	5	2
NL2	Cleveland Spiders	5*	7	7	0	5

*Denotes walk-off

== Managerial changes ==
=== Off-season ===
Team	Former Manager	New Manager
Cincinnati Reds	Charles Comiskey	Buck Ewing
Louisville Colonels	Billy Barnie	John McCloskey
New York Giants	John Ward	George Davis
St. Louis Browns	George Miller	Al Buckenberger

=== In-season ===
Team	Former Manager	New Manager
New York Giants	George Davis	Jack Doyle
New York Giants	Jack Doyle	Harvey Watkins
St. Louis Browns	Al Buckenberger	Chris von der Ahe
St. Louis Browns	Chris von der Ahe	Joe Quinn
St. Louis Browns	Joe Quinn	Lou Phelan

== League leaders ==
=== National League ===
Hitting leaders
Stat	Player	Total
AVG	Jesse Burkett (CLE)	.405
OPS	Ed Delahanty (PHI)	1.117
HR	Sam Thompson (PHI)	18
RBI	Sam Thompson (PHI)	165
R	Billy Hamilton (PHI)	166
H	Jesse Burkett (CLE)	225
SB	Billy Hamilton (PHI)	97

Pitching leaders
Stat	Player	Total
W	Cy Young (CLE)	35
L	Theodore Breitenstein (STL)	30
ERA	Al Maul (WAS)	2.45
K	Amos Rusie (NYG)	201
IP	Pink Hawley (PIT)	444.1
SV	Ernie Beam (PHI); Tom Parrott (CIN)	3
WHIP	Cy Young (CLE)	1.185

== Milestones ==
=== Batters ===
==== Cycles ====
- Tommy Dowd (STL):
  - Dowd hit for his first cycle and third in franchise history, on August 16 against the Louisville Colonels.
- Ed Cartwright (WAS):
  - Cartwright hit for his first cycle and second in franchise history, in game one of a doubleheader on September 30 against the Boston Beaneaters.

==== Other batting accomplishments ====
- Arlie Latham (CIN):
  - Recorded his 700th career stolen base, becoming the first player to reach this mark. It is unknown what day this stolen base occurred.
- Billy Hamilton (PHI):
  - Recorded his 600th career stolen base, becoming the second player to reach this mark. It is unknown what day this stolen base occurred.
- Tom Brown (WAS/STL):
  - Recorded his 600th career stolen base, becoming the third player to reach this mark. It is unknown what day this stolen base occurred.

== Home field attendance ==
Team name	Wins	%±	Home attendance	%±	Per game
Philadelphia Phillies	78	9.9%	474,971	34.6%	6,506
Chicago Colts	72	26.3%	382,300	60.0%	5,706
Baltimore Orioles	87	−2.2%	293,000	−10.7%	4,373
Cincinnati Reds	66	20.0%	281,000	77.8%	4,323
Boston Beaneaters	71	−14.5%	242,000	58.4%	3,559
New York Giants	66	−25.0%	240,000	−38.0%	3,582
Brooklyn Grooms	71	1.4%	230,000	7.5%	3,433
Pittsburgh Pirates	71	9.2%	188,000	18.2%	2,806
St. Louis Browns	39	−30.4%	170,000	9.7%	2,500
Washington Senators	43	−4.4%	153,000	22.4%	2,217
Cleveland Spiders	84	23.5%	143,000	74.4%	2,306
Louisville Colonels	35	−2.8%	92,000	22.7%	1,559

== See also ==
- 1895 in baseball (Events, Births, Deaths)
