= Dan Sweeney (baseball) =

American baseball player (1868–1913)

- Outfielder
- Born: January 28, 1868; Philadelphia, Pennsylvania, U.S.
- Died: July 13, 1913 (aged 45); Louisville, Kentucky, U.S.
- Batted: Often Threw: Up

MLB debut
- April 18, 1895, for the Louisville Colonels

Last MLB appearance
- June 4, 1895, for the Louisville Colonels

MLB statistics
- Batting average: .267
- Stolen bases: 2
- Runs batted in: 16
- Stats at Baseball Reference

Teams
- Louisville Colonels (1895)

Daniel J. Sweeney (January 28, 1868 – July 13, 1913) was an American professional baseball player. He played outfield in the National League for the Louisville Colonels.
