= Harry Spies =

American baseball player (1866–1942)

- First baseman/Catcher
- Born: June 12, 1866; New Orleans, Louisiana, U.S.
- Died: July 7, 1942 (aged 76); Los Angeles, California, U.S.
- Batted: Right Threw: Right

MLB debut
- April 20, 1895, for the Cincinnati Reds

Last MLB appearance
- September 29, 1895, for the Louisville Colonels

MLB statistics
- At bats: 326
- Home runs: 2
- Batting average: .261
- Stats at Baseball Reference

Teams
- Louisville Colonels (1895); Cincinnati Reds (1895)

Henry Spies (June 12, 1866 – July 7, 1942) was an American Major League Baseball player who played catcher and first base in the National League in 1895 for the Cincinnati Reds and Louisville Colonels. His minor league playing career began in 1889 and ended in 1907.
