= Louisville Colonels all-time roster =

List of baseball players

- The following is a list of players and who appeared in at least one game for the **Louisville Colonels** franchise of Major League Baseball from 1882 through 1899. This includes the Louisville Eclipse of the American Association, as well as the Colonels of both the AA and the National League. Players in **bold** are in the Baseball Hall of Fame.

== A ==
- Nick Altrock
- Bill Anderson
- Wally Andrews

== B ==
- Norm Baker
- Charley Bassett
- Burley Bayer
- Ollie Beard
- Charlie Bell
- Ned Bligh
- Charlie Bohn
- George Boone
- Amos Booth
- George Borchers
- Eddie Boyle
- Kitty Brashear
- Grant Briggs
- **Dan Brouthers**
- Lew Brown
- Tom Brown
- William Brown
- Pete Browning
- Hercules Burnett
- Dick Butler

== C ==
- Tom Cahill
- Scoops Carey
- Fred Carl
- Pete Cassidy
- Elton Chamberlain
- Bill Childress
- Bob Clark
- Win Clark
- Dad Clarke
- **Fred Clarke**
- Josh Clarke
- Fritz Clausen
- Monk Cline
- Billy Clingman
- Hub Collins
- **Jimmy Collins**
- John Connor
- Paul Cook
- Henry Cote
- Harry Croft
- Jack Crooks
- Amos Cross
- Joe Cross
- Lave Cross
- Joe Crotty
- Billy Crowell
- Bert Cunningham

== D ==
- Ed Daily
- Jack Darragh
- Harry Davis
- Ren Deagle
- George Decker
- Tom Delahanty
- Jerry Denny
- Charlie Dexter
- Buttercup Dickerson
- Joe Dolan
- Patsy Donovan
- Harry Dooms
- John Doran
- Pete Dowling
- Tom Dowse
- Denny Driscoll
- Sam Dungan
- John Dyler

== E ==
- Billy Earle
- Henry Easterday
- Red Ehret
- Bones Ely
- Charlie Emig
- Dude Esterbrook
- Frank Eustace
- Roy Evans
- John Ewing

== F ==
- Clay Fauver
- Charles Fisher
- Warren Fitzgerald
- Pat Flaherty
- Patsy Flaherty
- Ed Flanagan
- Paddy Fox
- Chick Fraser
- Frank Freund
- Eddie Fusselback

== G ==
- John Galligan
- Mike Gaule
- Billy Geer
- Joe Gerhardt
- Tom Gettinger
- Pete Gilbert
- Jack Glasscock
- Bill Gleason
- Jack Gleason
- Herb Goodall
- John Grim
- Billy Gumbert

== H ==
- Irv Hach
- Charlie Hamburg
- Jerry Harrington
- Topsy Hartsel
- Bill Hassamaer
- Gil Hatfield
- John Healy
- Guy Hecker
- Jack Heinzman
- George Hemming
- Ducky Hemp
- Art Herman
- Bill Hill
- Ducky Holmes
- Dummy Hoy
- Rudy Hulswitt
- Bill Hunter

== I ==
- Bert Inks
- John Irwin

== J ==
- **Hughie Jennings**
- Abbie Johnson
- Alex Jones
- Jim Jones
- Mike Jones
- Ri Jones

== K ==
- Mike Kelley
- Bill Kemmer
- Ted Kennedy
- John Kerins
- Fred Ketcham
- Matt Kilroy
- Tom Kinslow
- Malachi Kittridge
- Bill Kling
- Phil Knell
- Joe Kostal
- Charlie Krehmeyer
- Bill Kuehne

== L ==
- Fred Lake
- Bob Langsford
- Sam LaRocque
- Juice Latham
- Tacks Latimer
- Tommy Leach
- Jack Leary
- Thomas Long
- Jim Long
- Pat Luby
- Con Lucid
- Henry Luff
- Luke Lutenberg

== M ==
- Denny Mack
- Reddy Mack
- Bill Magee
- Lou Mahaffey
- Frank Martin
- Harry Maskrey
- Leech Maskrey
- Al Mays
- Harry McCaffery
- Barry McCormick
- Tom McCreery
- Mike H. McDermott
- Mike J. McDermott
- Alex McFarlan
- Dan McFarlan
- Herm McFarland
- Ambrose McGann
- Tom McLaughlin
- George Meakim
- Jouett Meekin
- Jock Menefee
- Ed Merrill
- Bill Merritt
- Tom Messitt
- Bert Miller
- Doggie Miller
- Joe Miller
- Dan Minnehan
- Tom Morrison
- Tony Mullane
- Clarence Murphy
- Miah Murray

== N ==
- Kid Nance
- Joe Neale
- George Nicol

== O ==
- John O'Brien
- Dan O'Connor
- Tim O'Rourke

== P ==
- Harrison Peppers
- Pat Pettee
- Fred Pfeffer
- Dan Phelan
- Deacon Phillippe
- Ollie Pickering
- Gracie Pierce
- George Pinkney
- Doc Powers
- Walt Preston
- Walter Prince

== R ==
- Toad Ramsey
- Harry Raymond
- John Reccius
- Phil Reccius
- Nick Reeder
- Billy Rhines
- Danny Richardson
- John Richter
- Claude Ritchey
- Jim Rogers
- Chief Roseman
- Bill Rotes
- Jack Ryan

== S ==
- Ben Sanders
- Jimmy Say
- Al Schellhase
- Bill Schenck
- Harry Scherer
- Ossee Schreckengost
- Emmett Seery
- Dan Shannon
- Frank Shannon
- Tim Shinnick
- Frank Shugart
- Harry Smith
- Heinie Smith
- Ollie Smith
- Pop Smith
- Skyrocket Smith
- Tom Smith
- Cooney Snyder
- Harry Spies
- Ed Springer
- General Stafford
- Farmer Steelman
- Len Stockwell
- Tom Stouch
- Sammy Strang
- Scott Stratton
- Joe Strauss
- Charles Strick
- Dan Sullivan
- Sleeper Sullivan
- Tom Sullivan
- Dan Sweeney
- Pete Sweeney
- Lou Sylvester

== T ==
- Billy Taylor
- Harry Taylor
- Tom Terrell
- Frank Todd
- Phil Tomney
- John Traffley
- George Treadway
- Mike Trost
- Larry Twitchell

== V ==
- Farmer Vaughn
- Peek-A-Boo Veach
- Lee Viau

== W ==
- **Rube Waddell**
- Jack Wadsworth
- **Honus Wagner**
- John Warner
- Farmer Weaver
- Sam Weaver
- Pete Weckbecker
- Curt Welch
- Tub Welch
- Jack Wentz
- Perry Werden
- Joe Werrick
- Gus Weyhing
- Lew Whistler
- Bill White
- Ed Whiting
- Bill Whitrock
- Harry Wilhelm
- Dave Wills
- Bill Wilson
- George Winkleman
- Jimmy Wolf
- Walt Woods
- Joe Wright

== Z ==
- Fred Zahner
- Chief Zimmer
