= 1889 Louisville Colonels season =

1889 Louisville Colonels
- League: American Association
- Ballpark: Eclipse Park
- City: Louisville, Kentucky
- Record: 27–111 (.196)
- League place: 8th
- Owners: Mordecai Davidson, John R. Botto
- Managers: Dude Esterbrook, Jimmy Wolf, Dan Shannon, Jack Chapman

The 1889 Louisville Colonels season was a season in American baseball. The team finished with a 27–111 record, last in the American Association.

The Colonels were the first Major League team to lose more than 100 games in a season. The previous record for losses was 92, set by the Washington Nationals in 1886 and matched by the Cleveland Blues in 1887. The record would be broken again in 1890 by the Pittsburgh Alleghenys, but remained the AA record until the league folded in 1891. At one point in the 1889 season the Colonels lost 26 consecutive games, which is still a major league record. In addition to that, the Colonels endured a 24-game losing streak on the road, which not only was the longest losing streak on the road throughout the MLB-recognized American Association, but was also an infamous feat that would not be tied until the 2021 Arizona Diamondbacks matched it 132 years later.

== Offseason ==
The team's owner, Mordecai Davidson, had taken control of the club in June 1888. The Colonels had a bad season that year, and then in the offseason the cash-strapped Davidson made the team even worse by selling three of his best players (pitcher Ice Box Chamberlain, catcher Lave Cross and outfielder Hub Collins). Davidson had managed the club himself for much of 1888, but he was criticized for that, so he brought in a new manager, Dude Esterbrook. He was also seeking a buyer for the team, as his own finances were precarious.

== Regular season ==
=== Early season woes ===
The 1889 season was a tumultuous one for the Colonels. Manager Esterbrook fined several players, and was fired just ten games into the season. Outfielder Jimmy "Chicken" Wolf was appointed team captain, although Davidson traveled with the team as well to ensure their good behavior – which proved quite unpopular.

Davidson continued to attempt to sell the club as the season progressed, but to no avail. On May 22, the team began a losing streak that would eventually reach 26 straight games, which still stands as the all-time Major League record as of 2024. Most of the losses came during a stretch from May 24 until July 1 in which the team played just three games at home. During this time, Davidson began levying fines on his players for minor infractions, including routine errors on the playing field.

=== The strike ===
Things were no better from the perspective of the AA. Financial difficulties had caused the team to miss payroll on three occasions, and the players alerted AA president Wheeler C. Wyckoff to the problem. This led the AA to call a meeting to discuss the issue on June 14. On the way to the meeting, Davidson was confronted by his players calling for the rescinding of previous fines, threatening to strike if refused. Davidson instead upped the ante, threatening to fine the players further if they lost.

The team was scheduled to play against the Baltimore Orioles on June 15. The Colonels had 12 men available for duty that day, but six of them refused to play. Three local semi-pro players, Walter Fisher, Mike Gaule and John Traffley, were recruited to join the remaining players on the field to allow the game to commence. The resulting game was shortened to five innings by rain; Baltimore won it by a score of 4–2. (None of the three replacement players ever played in another major league game.)

The six striking Louisville players were persuaded to call off their strike the next day, when the directors of the American Association agreed to review their grievances against Davidson.

=== Continuing problems ===
Davidson met payroll on June 21, but only by accounting for new fines to the team's players. In some cases, the fines exceeded the players' salary, and they were told they owed the club money. Star outfielder Pete Browning was fined $335, and total team fines came to $1,800, $1,200 of which was attributed to the walkout. Guy Hecker began taking steps towards founding a branch of John Montgomery Ward's Brotherhood of Professional Base Ball Players for the AA. On June 24, Davidson hired local bouncer Buck McKinney, ostensibly as team manager. While Wolf continued to handle on-field duties, McKinney traveled with the team to keep an eye on the players for the owner.

=== Davidson gives up ===
By July 2, however, another payroll was due, and when it became apparent that he would be unable to meet it, Davidson decided to turn the team over to the AA. He did so officially on July 5, at the same time that the players received their hearing from Wyckoff. On July 10, all previous fines were remitted, with the exception of those associated with the June 15 walkout. The team was sold to a consortium of ten Louisville businessmen who set about the task of rebuilding it. The team's new president, railroad executive Lawrence S. Parsons, hired a new manager, Jack Chapman, in September 1889. Chapman guided the Colonels for the last seven games of the 1889 season, and continued to serve as the club's manager until June 20, 1892.

Amazingly enough, after enduring a disastrous 1889 season, the Colonels won the American Association championship in 1890, thereby making history as the first major league team to go from "worst to first" in the span of a single year.

=== Season standings ===
American Association
Team	W	L	Pct.	GB	Home	Road
Brooklyn Bridegrooms	93	44	.679	—	50‍–‍19	43‍–‍25
St. Louis Browns	90	45	.667	2	51‍–‍18	39‍–‍27
Philadelphia Athletics	75	58	.564	16	46‍–‍22	29‍–‍36
Cincinnati Red Stockings	76	63	.547	18	47‍–‍26	29‍–‍37
Baltimore Orioles	70	65	.519	22	40‍–‍24	30‍–‍41
Columbus Solons	60	78	.435	33½	36‍–‍33	24‍–‍45
Kansas City Cowboys	55	82	.401	38	35‍–‍35	20‍–‍47
Louisville Colonels	27	111	.196	66½	18‍–‍46	9‍–‍65

=== Record vs. opponents ===
1889 American Association record Sources:
Team	BAL	BRO	CIN	COL	KC	LOU	PHA	STL
Baltimore	—	8–12	8–11–2	12–8	11–7	16–4	8–11	7–12–2
Brooklyn	12–8	—	15–5	11–8–2	16–4	19–1	12–7–1	8–11
Cincinnati	11–8–2	5–15	—	11–9	14–6	18–2	9–11	8–12
Columbus	8–12	8–11–2	9–11	—	9–11	13–7	7–12	6–14
Kansas City	7–11	4–16	6–14	11–9	—	13–6	8–12–1	6–14–1
Louisville	4–16	1–19	2–18	7–13	6–13	—	5–14–1	2–18–1
Philadelphia	11–8	7–12–1	11–9	12–7	12–8–1	14–5–1	—	8–9–2
St. Louis	12–7–2	11–8	12–8	14–6	14–6–1	18–2–1	9–8–2	—

=== Roster ===
1889 Louisville Colonels
Roster
Pitchers: Bill Anderson; Red Ehret; John Ewing; Michael McDermott; Toad Ramsey; Ed Springer	Catchers: Paul Cook; Jack Ryan; Farmer Vaughn; Infielders: Dude Esterbrook; Ed Flanagan; Bill Gleason; Guy Hecker; Harry Raymond; Dan Shannon; Phil Tomney	Outfielders: Pete Browning; Fred Carl; Charles Fisher; John Galligan; Mike Gaule; John Kerins; Harry Scherer; Harry Smith; Scott Stratton; John Traffley; Farmer Weaver; Jimmy Wolf	Manager: Jack Chapman; Dude Esterbrook; Dan Shannon; Jimmy Wolf

== Player stats ==
=== Batting ===
==== Starters by position ====
Note: Pos = Position; G = Games played; AB = At bats; H = Hits; Avg. = Batting average; HR = Home runs; RBI = Runs batted in

Pos	Player	G	AB	H	Avg.	HR	RBI
C	Paul Cook	81	286	65	.227	0	15
1B	Guy Hecker	81	327	93	.284	1	36
2B	Dan Shannon	121	498	128	.257	4	48
SS	Phil Tomney	112	376	80	.213	4	38
3B	Harry Raymond	130	515	123	.239	0	47
OF	Farmer Weaver	124	499	145	.291	0	60
OF	Jimmy Wolf	130	546	159	.291	3	57
OF	Pete Browning	83	324	83	.256	2	32

==== Other batters ====
Note: G = Games played; AB = At bats; H = Hits; Avg. = Batting average; HR = Home runs; RBI = Runs batted in

Player	G	AB	H	Avg.	HR	RBI
Farmer Vaughn	90	360	86	.239	3	45
Scott Stratton	62	222	66	.288	4	34
John Galligan	31	120	20	.167	0	7
Fred Carl	25	99	20	.202	0	13
Ed Flanagan	23	88	22	.250	0	8
Jack Ryan	20	79	14	.177	0	2
Bill Gleason	16	58	14	.241	0	5
Dude Esterbrook	11	44	14	.318	0	9
John Kerins	2	9	3	.333	0	3
Harry Scherer	1	3	1	.333	0	0
John Traffley	1	2	1	.500	0	0
Harry Smith	1	2	1	.500	0	1
Charles Fisher	1	2	1	.500	0	0
Mike Gaule	1	2	0	.000	0	0

=== Pitching ===
==== Starting pitchers ====
Note: G = Games pitched; IP = Innings pitched; W = Wins; L = Losses; ERA = Earned run average; SO = Strikeouts

Player	G	IP	W	L	ERA	SO
Red Ehret	45	364.0	10	29	4.80	135
John Ewing	40	331.0	6	30	4.87	155
Guy Hecker	19	151.1	5	13	5.59	33
Toad Ramsey	18	140.0	1	16	5.59	60
Scott Stratton	19	133.2	3	13	3.23	42
Michael McDermott	9	84.1	1	8	4.16	22
Harry Raymond	1	9.0	1	0	1.00	1
Bill Anderson	1	8.0	0	1	10.13	2
Ed Springer	1	5.0	0	1	9.00	1
