= List of Louisville Colonels managers =

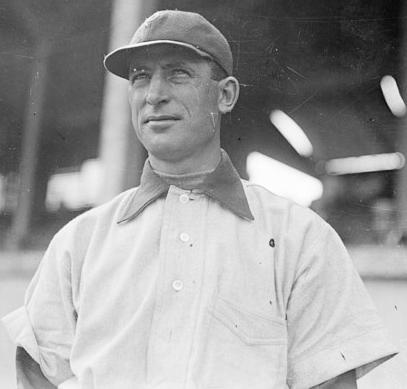
Hall of Famer Fred Clarke was the Louisville Colonels' last Major League manager.

The Louisville Colonels were a Major League Baseball team that played in Louisville, Kentucky. They played in the American Association when it was considered a major league from 1882 through 1891 and in the National League from 1892 through 1899, after which the team folded and its best players were transferred to the Pittsburgh Pirates. From 1882 through 1884 the team was named the Louisville Eclipse. During their time as a Major League team, the Colonels employed 17 managers. The duties of the team manager include team strategy and leadership on and off the field.

The Colonels' first manager was Denny Mack. Mack managed the team for one season (1882), in which he led the Colonels to a record of 38 wins and 42 losses. Fred Clarke was the Colonels' last manager. Clarke took over as player-manager of the team during the 1897 season, and managed the team through the 1899 season while also playing as an outfielder for the Colonels. Clarke was one of the players transferred to the Pittsburgh Pirates in 1900, as were Honus Wagner, Tommy Leach, Claude Ritchey and Deacon Phillippe. Clarke took over as the Pirates' player-manager, and after a second-place finish in 1900, he led the Pirates, with the former Colonels stars, to three consecutive league pennants in 1901, 1902, 1903, and a World Series championship in 1909. Clarke was inducted into the Baseball Hall of Fame in 1945, the only Colonels' manager so honored. The Colonels won their only Major League pennant when they had the best record in the American Association in 1890. They played to a tie in the World Series that season against the National League champion Brooklyn Bridegrooms; each team won three games and there was one tie game.^{[a]} Jack Chapman was the Colonels' manager that season.

Clarke holds the Colonels' record for games managed (402), managerial wins (180), and managerial losses (212). Mike Walsh, who managed the team in 1884, has the highest winning percentage of any Colonels' manager, at .630. The only other two managers who had winning percentages over .500 for the Colonels are Mack and Joe Gerhardt, who managed the team in 1883. The only Colonels' manager who served more than one term was Mordecai Davidson, who served two terms during the 1888 season while he was also the team's owner. Davidson replaced John Kelly for three games before being replaced by John Kerins. After Kerins managed the Colonels for seven games, Davidson took over again for the final 90 games of the season. Davidson's total managerial record with the Colonels was 93 games managed with 35 wins and 54 losses, for a winning percentage of .393.

== Table key ==
| # | A running total of the number of Colonels managers. Any manager who has two or more separate terms is counted only once. |
| G | Number of regular season games managed; may not equal sum of wins and losses due to tie games |
| W | Number of regular season wins in games managed |
| L | Number of regular season losses in games managed |
| WPct | Winning percentage: number of wins divided by number of games managed |
| PA | Playoff appearances: number of years this manager has led the franchise to the playoffs |
| PW | Playoff wins: number of wins this manager has accrued in the playoffs |
| PL | Playoff losses: number of losses this manager has accrued in the playoffs |
| LC | League Championships: number of League Championships, or pennants, achieved by the manager |
| WS | World Series: number of World Series victories achieved by the manager |
| † | Elected to the National Baseball Hall of Fame |

== Managers ==
| #^{[b]} | Image | Manager | Seasons | G | W | L | WPct | PA | PW | PL | LC | WS | Ref |
|---|---|---|---|---|---|---|---|---|---|---|---|---|---|
| 1 | | Denny Mack | 1882 | 80 | 42 | 38 | .525 | — | — | — | — | — | |
| 2 | | Joe Gerhardt | 1883 | 98 | 52 | 45 | .536 | — | — | — | — | — | |
| 3 | | Mike Walsh | 1884 | 110 | 68 | 40 | .630 | — | — | — | — | — | |
| 4 | | Jim Hart | 1885–1886 | 250 | 119 | 129 | .480 | — | — | — | — | — | |
| 5 | | John Kelly | 1887–1888 | 178 | 86 | 89 | .491 | — | — | — | — | — | |
| 6 | | Mordecai Davidson | 1888 | 3 | 1 | 2 | .333 | — | — | — | — | — | |
| 7 | | John Kerins | 1888 | 7 | 3 | 4 | .429 | — | — | — | — | — | |
| — | | Mordecai Davidson | 1888 | 90 | 34 | 52 | .395 | — | — | — | — | — | |
| 8 | | Dude Esterbrook | 1889 | 10 | 2 | 8 | .200 | — | — | — | — | — | |
| 9 | | Jimmy Wolf | 1889 | 65 | 14 | 51 | .215 | — | — | — | — | — | |
| 10 | | Dan Shannon | 1889 | 58 | 10 | 46 | .179 | — | — | — | — | — | |
| 11 | | Jack Chapman | 1889–1892 | 336 | 164 | 166 | .497 | 1 | 3 | 3 | 1 | 0^{[a]} | |
| 12 | | Fred Pfeffer | 1892 | 100 | 42 | 56 | .429 | — | — | — | — | — | |
| 13 | | Billy Barnie | 1893–1894 | 257 | 86 | 169 | .337 | — | — | — | — | — | |
| 14 | | John McCloskey | 1895–1896 | 152 | 37 | 113 | .247 | — | — | — | — | — | |
| 15 | | Bill McGunnigle | 1896 | 115 | 36 | 76 | .321 | — | — | — | — | — | |
| 16 | | Jim Rogers | 1897 | 44 | 17 | 24 | .415 | — | — | — | — | — | |
| 17 | | Fred Clarke^{†} | 1897–1899 | 402 | 180 | 212 | .459 | — | — | — | — | — | |
| Totals | | 17 managers | 18 seasons | 2,355 | 993 | 1,320 | .429 | 1 | 3 | 3 | 1 | 0 | |

== Footnotes ==
- ^{a} Although the Colonels played in the tournament called the World Series in 1890, the 19th-century World Series was a different event from the current World Series, which began in 1903. The 19th-century World Series was considered an exhibition contest between the champion of the National League and the champion of the American Association. The Colonels tied the Brooklyn Bridegrooms in the 1890 World Series.
