= List of Louisville Colonels Opening Day starting pitchers =

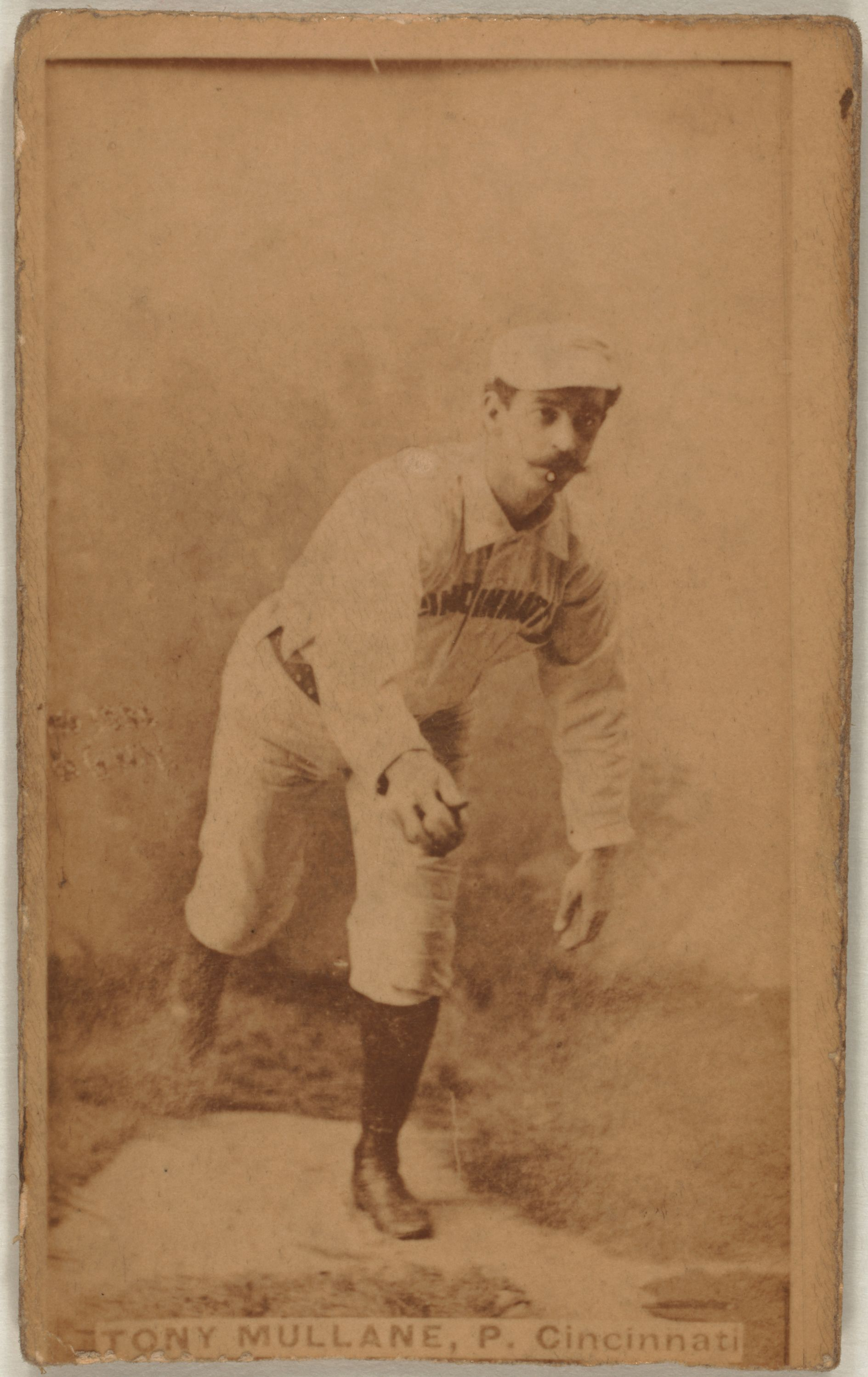
Tony Mullane started the first game in Louisville Colonels history on May 2, 1882.

The Louisville Colonels were a Major League Baseball team that played from 1882 to 1899 and were based in Louisville, Kentucky. The team played in the American Association from 1882 to 1891 and in the National League from 1892 to 1899. The team was known as the Louisville Eclipse from 1882 to 1884. The Colonels used 11 Opening Day starting pitchers in their 18 years as a Major League franchise. The first game of the new baseball season for a team is played on Opening Day, and being named the Opening Day starter is an honor, which is often given to the player who is expected to lead the pitching staff that season, though there are various strategic reasons why a team's best pitcher might not start on Opening Day. The Colonels had a record of 10 wins and 8 losses in their Opening Day games.

The first game in Colonels' history was played on May 2, 1882, against the St. Louis Browns, now known as the St. Louis Cardinals. Tony Mullane was the Opening Day starting pitcher for the Colonels in that game, which the Colonels lost by a score of 9–7. The Colonels' last Opening Day game was on April 14, 1899, against the Chicago Orphans, now known as the Chicago Cubs. Bert Cunningham was the Colonels' Opening Day starting pitcher for that game, which the Colonels lost by a score of 15–1.

Five pitchers made multiple Opening Day starts for the Colonels. Guy Hecker had the most Opening Day starts for the Colonels, with four, starting in every Opening Day game from 1883 through 1886. Toad Ramsey, Scott Stratton, Chick Fraser and Cunningham each made two Opening Day starts for the team. After making the Opening Day start in 1884, Hecker went on to achieve what is now known as the pitching Triple Crown by leading the American Association in wins, with 52, strikeouts, with 385, and earned run average, with 1.80. Hecker's 52 wins that season are 3rd all time among Major League Baseball pitchers. No Baseball Hall of Famers made Opening Day starts for the Colonels. However, as of 2011, Mullane's 284 career wins ranked 3rd among eligible pitchers who have not been inducted to the Hall of Fame, behind just Bobby Mathews and Tommy John.

The Colonels won one American Association championship, in 1890. That year, they played in the 19th century version of the World Series against the National League champion Brooklyn Bridegrooms, now known as the Los Angeles Dodgers, in a series that ended in a tie. Stratton was the Colonels' Opening Day starting pitcher that season, in a game the Colonels lost to the Browns 11–8.

== Key ==
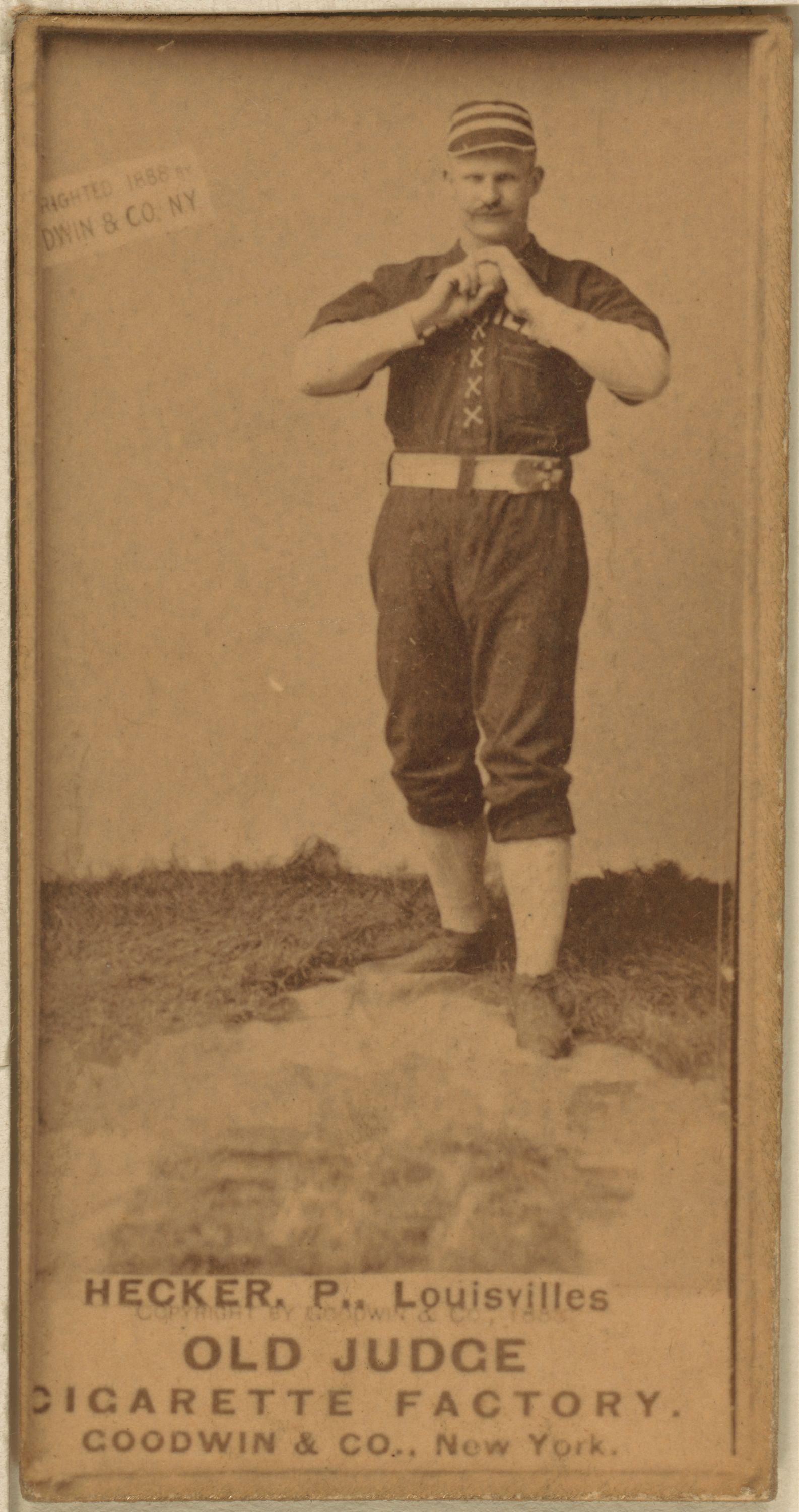
Guy Hecker was the Colonels' Opening Day starting pitcher in four consecutive seasons, from 1883 through 1886.

Season	Each year is linked to an article about that particular Colonels season.
W	Win
L	Loss
T	Tie game
ND (W)	No decision by starting pitcher; Colonels won game
ND (L)	No decision by starting pitcher; Colonels lost game
(W)	Colonels won game; no information on starting pitcher's decision
(L)	Colonels lost game; no information on starting pitcher's decision
Final score	Game score with Colonels runs listed first
Location	Stadium in italics for home game
(#)	Number of appearances as Opening Day starter with the Colonels
**	Colonels were American Association Champions

== Pitchers ==
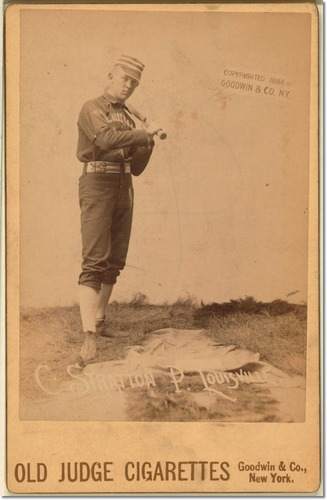
Scott Stratton was the Colonels Opening Day starting pitcher in 1890, when the franchise won its only American Association title.

Bert Cunningham was the Colonels' last Opening Day starting pitcher.

Season	Pitcher	Decision	Final Score	Opponent	Location (Stadium)	References
1882	Tony Mullane	(L)	7–9	St. Louis Browns	Sportsman's Park	
1883	Guy Hecker	(W)	6–5	Columbus Buckeyes	Recreation Park	
1884	Guy Hecker (2)	(W)	5–1	Toledo Blue Stockings	Eclipse Park	
1885	Guy Hecker (3)	(L)	1–4	Cincinnati Reds	Eclipse Park	
1886	Guy Hecker (4)	(W)	5–1	Cincinnati Reds	League Park	
1887	Toad Ramsey	(W)	8–3	St. Louis Browns	Eclipse Park	
1888	Toad Ramsey (2)	(L)	0–8	St. Louis Browns	Sportsman's Park	
1889	John Ewing	(L)	4–7	Kansas City Cowboys	Eclipse Park	
1890**	Scott Stratton	(L)	8–11	St. Louis Browns	Eclipse Park	
1891	Ed Daily	(W)	7–6	Columbus Solons	Eclipse Park	
1892	Jouett Meekin	(W)	5–2	Cleveland Spiders	Eclipse Park	
1893	Scott Stratton (2)	(L)	2–4	St. Louis Browns	Robison Field	
1894	Jock Menefee	(W)	10–3	Cleveland Spiders	Eclipse Park	
1895	Bert Inks	(W)	11–2	Pittsburgh Pirates	Eclipse Park	
1896	Chick Fraser	(L)	2–4	Chicago Colts	Eclipse Park	
1897	Chick Fraser (2)	(W)	3–1	Cleveland Spiders	Eclipse Park	
1898	Bert Cunningham	(W)	10–3	Pittsburgh Pirates	Eclipse Park	
1899	Bert Cunningham (2)	(L)	1–15	Chicago Orphans	Eclipse Park	
