= List of Major League Baseball single-season wins leaders =

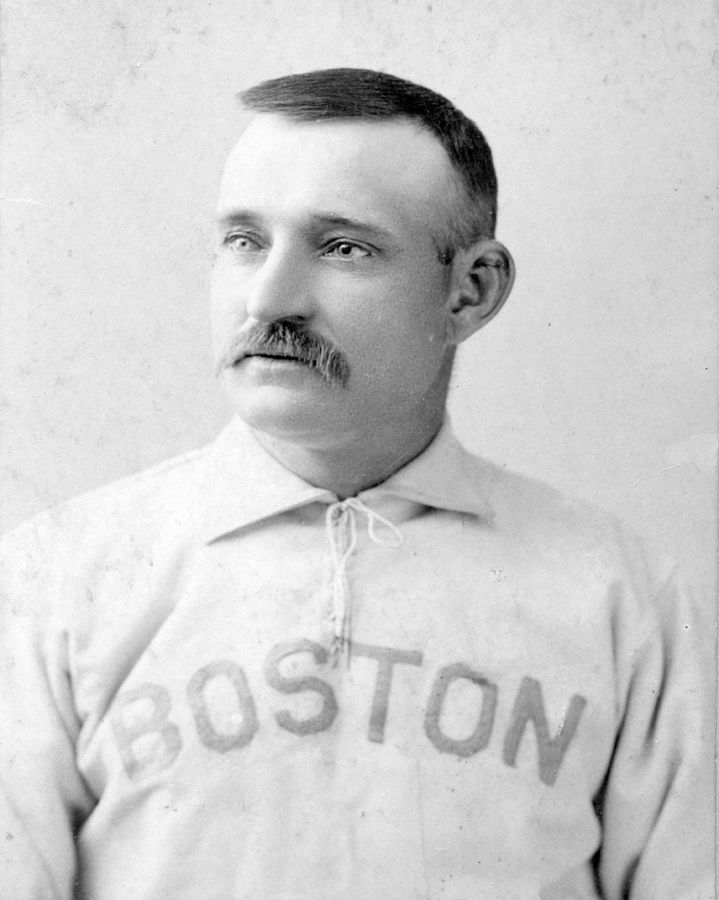
Charles Radbourn, the single-season leader in wins.

In Major League Baseball, the winning pitcher is defined as the pitcher who last pitched prior to the half-inning when the winning team took the lead for the last time. There are two exceptions to this rule. The first is that a starting pitcher must complete five innings to earn a win (four innings for a game that lasts five innings on defense). If he fails to do so, he is ineligible to be the winning pitcher even if he last pitched prior to the half-inning when his team took the lead for the last time, and the official scorer awards the win to the relief pitcher who, in the official scorer's judgment, was the most effective. The second exception applies if the relief pitcher who last pitched prior to the half-inning when the winning team took the lead for the last time was "ineffective in a brief appearance" in the official scorer's judgment, in which case the win is awarded to the succeeding relief pitcher who, in the official scorer's judgment, was the most effective.

Charles Radbourn holds the record for the most wins in a single-season, winning 60 games in 1884. John Clarkson (53 in 1885) and Guy Hecker (52 in 1884) are the only other pitchers to win more than 50 games in a single-season.

== Key ==
Rank	Rank amongst leaders in single-season wins. A blank field indicates a tie.
Player	Name of player.
W	Total single-season wins.
Year	Season wins were recorded.
*	Denotes elected to National Baseball Hall of Fame.

== List ==
Rank	Player	W	Year
1	Old Hoss Radbourn *	60	1884
2	John Clarkson *	53	1885
3	Guy Hecker	52	1884
4	John Clarkson *	49	1889
5	Charlie Buffinton	48	1884
	Old Hoss Radbourn *	48	1883
7	Albert Spalding *	47	1876
	John Montgomery Ward *	47	1879
9	Pud Galvin *	46	1883
	Pud Galvin *	46	1884
	Matt Kilroy	46	1887
12	George Bradley	45	1876
	Silver King	45	1888
	Jim McCormick	45	1880
15	Bill Hutchison	44	1891
	Mickey Welch *	44	1885
17	Tommy Bond	43	1879
	Larry Corcoran	43	1880
	Billy Taylor	43	1884
	Will White	43	1879
	Will White	43	1883
22	Lady Baldwin	42	1886
	Tim Keefe *	42	1886
24	Jack Chesbro *	41	1904
	Dave Foutz	41	1886
	Bill Hutchison	41	1890
	Tim Keefe *	41	1883
	Ed Morris	41	1886
	Charlie Sweeney	41	1884
30	Tommy Bond	40	1877
	Tommy Bond	40	1878
	Bob Caruthers	40	1885
	Bob Caruthers	40	1889
	Jim McCormick	40	1884
	Bill Sweeney	40	1884
	Ed Walsh *	40	1908

Rank	Player	W	Year
	Will White	40	1882
38	Ed Morris	39	1885
	John Montgomery Ward *	39	1880
	Mickey Welch *	39	1884
41	John Clarkson *	38	1887
	Kid Gleason	38	1890
	Toad Ramsey	38	1886
44	Pud Galvin *	37	1879
	Tim Keefe *	37	1884
	Jack Lynch	37	1884
	Christy Mathewson *	37	1908
	Toad Ramsey	37	1887
	Jim Whitney	37	1883
50	John Clarkson	36	1886
	Bill Hutchison	36	1892
	Walter Johnson *	36	1913
	Frank Killen	36	1893
	Jim McCormick	36	1882
	Sadie McMahon	36	1890
	Tony Mullane	36	1884
	Amos Rusie *	36	1894
	Cy Young *	36	1892
59	Larry Corcoran	35	1884
	Jim Devlin	35	1877
	Tim Keefe	35	1887
	Tim Keefe	35	1888
	Silver King	35	1889
	Joe McGinnity *	35	1904
	Sadie McMahon	35	1891
	Tony Mullane	35	1883
	Kid Nichols *	35	1892
	Ed Seward	35	1888
	Jack Stivetts	35	1892
	Cy Young *	35	1895
71	Larry Corcoran	34	1883
	George Haddock	34	1891

Rank	Player	W	Year
	Ed Morris	34	1884
	Kid Nichols *	34	1893
	Mike Smith	34	1887
	Scott Stratton	34	1890
	Mickey Welch *	34	1880
	Will White	34	1884
	Smoky Joe Wood	34	1912
	Cy Young *	34	1893
81	Grover Cleveland Alexander *	33	1916
	Mark Baldwin	33	1890
	John Clarkson *	33	1888
	John Clarkson *	33	1891
	Dave Foutz	33	1885
	Walter Johnson *	33	1912
	Christy Mathewson *	33	1904
	Jouett Meekin	33	1894
	Tony Mullane	33	1886
	Henry Porter	33	1885
	Old Hoss Radbourn *	33	1882
	Amos Rusie *	33	1891
	Amos Rusie *	33	1893
	Jack Stivetts	33	1891
	Mickey Welch *	33	1886
	Cy Young *	33	1901
97	Ice Box Chamberlain	32	1889
	Jesse Duryea	32	1889
	Bob Emslie	32	1884
	Tim Keefe *	32	1885
	Silver King	32	1887
	Kid Nichols *	32	1894
	Lee Richmond	32	1880
	Amos Rusie *	32	1892
	Gus Weyhing	32	1892
	Cy Young *	32	1902

== See also ==
- Baseball statistics
- List of Major League Baseball career wins leaders
- List of Major League Baseball annual wins leaders
- 300 win club
