= 1890 World Series =

Pre-modern baseball championship

1890 World's Championship Series
Team (Wins)	Manager(s)	Season
Brooklyn Bridegrooms (3)	Bill McGunnigle	86–43–0 (.667), GA: 6½
Louisville Colonels (3)	Jack Chapman	88–44–4 (.662), GA: 10
- Dates: October 17–28
- Venue(s): Washington Park (Brooklyn); Eclipse Park (Louisville)

The 1890 World Series was an end-of-the-year baseball playoff series between the National League champion Brooklyn Bridegrooms (later known as the Dodgers) and the American Association champion Louisville Colonels.

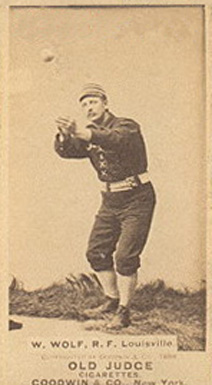
Chicken Wolf

This Series was part of the pre-modern-era World Series, an annual competition between the champions of the National League and the American Association. The best-of-7 games Series ended without resolution. Each club won 3 games, with 1 game ending in a tie.

After losing the 1889 World Series to their "cross-town" rivals, the New York Giants (Brooklyn was actually a separate city until 1898), the Bridegrooms came back strong and won the National League pennant in 1890, the first major league club to win consecutive pennants in two different leagues (the only other being the Boston Reds (1890–91)).

The major league world was in turmoil in 1890, as many of the best players had jumped to an outlaw organization called the Players' League. Although the Brotherhood only lasted the one season, it had a detrimental financial effect on the other two leagues, especially the Association.

Although the Boston Reds of the Players' League were probably the best team in the majors, and had floated the idea of a three-way World Series, the established leagues ignored them and made arrangements for the usual NL-AA contest, this time to be a conventional best-4-of-7 Series.

The games were held at the Bridegrooms' home field, Washington Park, and the Colonels' home field, Eclipse Park. The first four were played in Louisville (including a tie in Game 3), and the remainder of the Series was scheduled for Brooklyn.

The Series commenced on October 17 and concluded on October 28. The weather had become progressively worse as the Series wore on, and prior to Game 7, the two managers agreed that this would be the final game, and if Louisville won the game to square the Series at 3–3–1 (which they did), that there would be a deciding championship game the following spring.

- Game 1, October 17, at Louisville – Brooklyn 9, Louisville 0 (8 innings)
- Game 2, October 18, at Louisville – Brooklyn 5, Louisville 3
- Game 3, October 20, at Louisville – Brooklyn 7, Louisville 7 (8 innings – tied)
- Game 4, October 21, at Louisville – Louisville 5, Brooklyn 4
- Game 5, October 25, at Brooklyn – Brooklyn 7, Louisville 2
- Game 6, October 27, at Brooklyn – Louisville 9, Brooklyn 8
- Game 7, October 28, at Brooklyn – Louisville 6, Brooklyn 2

Unfortunately for that plan, the championship game was never held. Disputes arose between the National League and the American Association during the winter about the redistribution of players following the dissolution of the Players' League. The Association ended its relationship with the League before the spring of 1891, so the anticipated championship game was canceled, and no World Series was held in 1891. The 1891 pennant winners would be the Boston Beaneaters of the NL and the Boston Reds of the AA, who had joined the Association from the Players' League. This would turn out to be the only time two Boston clubs would win their respective league championships. It would also turn out to be the second (and last) time that a club won pennants in consecutive years in different leagues.

Following the 1891 season, the Association folded, and four clubs were brought into the League. The League would attempt a championships series during the 1890s called the Temple Cup Series, which would prove to be better organized and better attended than the NL-AA contests, and would help pave the way to the modern World Series that would begin in 1903.

== Sources ==
- Baseball Library chronology for 1890
- Glory Fades Away: The Nineteenth-Century World Series Rediscovered, by Jerry Lansche, Taylor Publishing, Dallas, Texas, 1991: pp. 183–204.

== See also ==
- The original World Series
