= Zach Phelps =

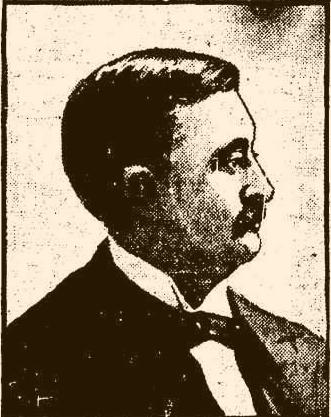
- Born: July 17, 1857; Hopkinsville, Kentucky, U.S.
- Died: August 29, 1901 (aged 44); Louisville, Kentucky, U.S.
- Resting place: Cave Hill Cemetery; Louisville, Kentucky, U.S.

Zachary Phelps (July 17, 1857 - August 29, 1901) was an American Major League Baseball executive who served as a principal shareholder, front office executive and president of the Louisville Colonels of the American Association from 1884 to 1888. He later served as president of the association.

== Early life and career ==
Phelps was born in Hopkinsville, Kentucky in 1857, and moved to Louisville, Kentucky at a young age. His father was a wealthy tobacco merchant. Phelps became a lawyer, and formed a partnership with William Jackson.

Phelps, along with his brother, John, and William Jackson, purchased the Louisville Colonels following the 1883 season. He became club president in 1885 and was elected chairman of the American Association in December 1886. In February 1888, he stepped down as Louisville president and was replaced by broker, Louisville councilman and future mayor pro tem William L. Lyons. He then worked as an attorney for the association. In June 1888, he sold his remaining shares of the club to Mordecai Davidson. However, he would return to the club as a director on July 13, 1889.

On November 15, 1889, Phelps was elected president of the association by league delegates, He was reelected in November 1890, but refused to accept the position. He would again serve as president near the end of the 1891 season. He would later serve an attorney for the National League. He died in Louisville in 1901, and is buried near former Colonel Pete Browning in Cave Hill Cemetery.

== Bibliography ==
- Nemec, David (2011). Major League Baseball Profiles, 1871-1900, Volume 2: The Hall of Famers and Memorable Personalities Who Shaped the Game. Bison Books. ISBN 978-0-803-23532-8.
