= List of Major League Baseball career wild pitches leaders =

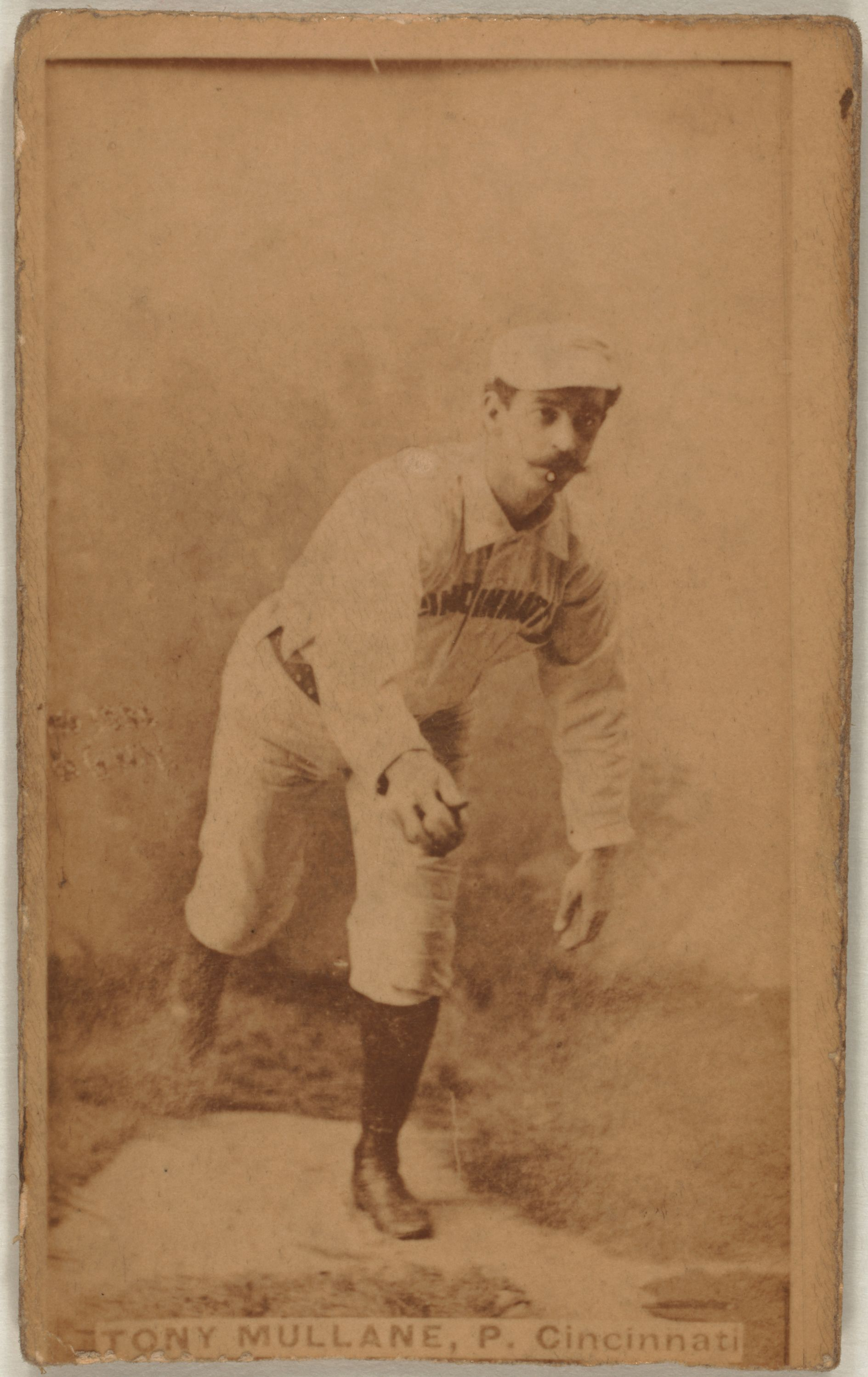
Tony Mullane, the all-time leader in wild pitches.

In baseball, a wild pitch (abbreviated WP) is charged against a pitcher when his pitch is too high, too short, or too wide of home plate for the catcher to control with ordinary effort, thereby allowing a baserunner, perhaps even the batter-runner on an uncaught third strike, to advance. A wild pitch usually passes the catcher behind home plate, often allowing runners on base an easy chance to advance while the catcher chases the ball down. Sometimes the catcher may block a pitch, and the ball may be nearby, but the catcher has trouble finding the ball, allowing runners to advance.

Tony Mullane is the all-time leader in wild pitches with 343 career. Mullane is also the only player to throw more than 300 career wild pitches.

== Key ==
**Rank**	Rank amongst leaders in career wild pitches thrown. A blank field indicates a tie.
**Player**	Name of player.
**WP**	Total career wild pitches thrown.
*	Denotes elected to National Baseball Hall of Fame.
**Bold**	Denotes active player.

== List ==
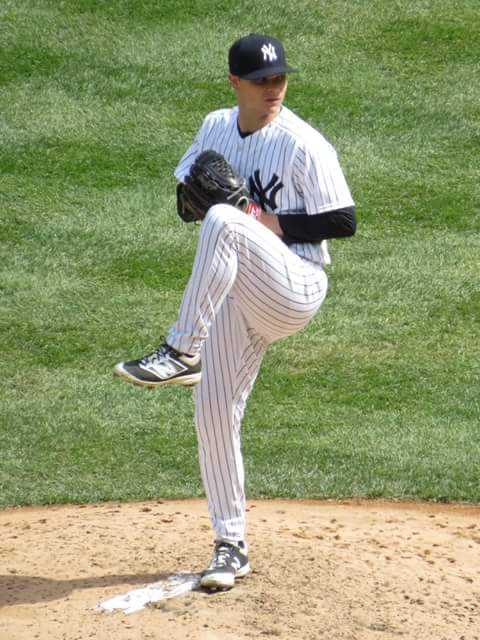
Sonny Gray, the active leader in career wild pitches and tied for 94th all-time.

- Stats updated as of 2026 season.

Rank	Player (2027 WP)	WP
1	Tony Mullane	343
2	Nolan Ryan*	277
3	Mickey Welch*	274
4	Bobby Mathews	253
5	Tim Keefe*	240
	Gus Weyhing	240
7	Phil Niekro*	226
8	Mark Baldwin	221
	Pud Galvin*	221
	Will White	221
11	Charles Radbourn*	214
	Jim Whitney	214
13	Jack Morris*	206
	Adonis Terry	206
15	Matt Kilroy	203
16	George Bradley	189
17	Tommy John	187
18	Steve Carlton*	183
19	John Clarkson*	182
20	Charlie Hough	179
	Toad Ramsey	179
22	Hardie Henderson	178
23	Charlie Buffinton	174
24	Joe Niekro	172
25	Kid Nichols*	169
26	A. J. Burnett	161
	Bert Cunningham	161
28	Jim McCormick	160
	Gaylord Perry*	160
30	Egyptian Healy	159
31	Red Ames	156
	Félix Hernández	156
	Cy Young*	156
34	Walter Johnson*	154
35	Amos Rusie*	153
36	Jersey Bakley	152
	Silver King	152
38	Ice Box Chamberlain	149
	David Cone	149
40	Ed Crane	146
	Chick Fraser	146
42	John Smoltz*	145
43	John Montgomery Ward*	144
44	Tommy Bond	143
	Roger Clemens	143
46	Sam McDowell	140
47	Jack Lynch	138
48	Ed Seward	136
49	Jumbo McGinnis	135
	Mike Moore	135

Rank	Player (2027 WP)	WP
51	Tim Wakefield	134
52	John Harkins	133
53	Chuck Finley	130
54	Bob Caruthers	129
55	Guy Hecker	128
	Jim Kaat*	128
	Bobby Witt	128
58	Tom Seaver*	126
59	John Lackey	125
60	Mickey Lolich	124
	Jim Maloney	124
62	Bill Hutchison	123
63	Hank O'Day*	122
64	Orel Hershiser	121
	Jouett Meekin	121
66	Tom Candiotti	120
	Jack Stivetts	120
68	Larry Cheney	119
	Tony Cloninger	119
	Dave Stewart	119
	Frank Tanana	119
	Fernando Valenzuela	119
73	Joe Coleman	118
74	Al Mays	116
75	Christy Mathewson*	115
76	Bert Blyleven*	114
77	Larry Corcoran	113
78	Tom Gordon	112
	Lindy McDaniel	112
	Ed Morris	112
	Don Sutton*	112
82	Charlie Getzien	111
83	Randy Johnson*	109
	Hideo Nomo	109
85	Kevin Brown	108
	Bob Gibson*	108
	Edwin Jackson	108
	Clayton Kershaw	108
89	Bob Barr	107
	**Sonny Gray (0)**	107
	Mark Gubicza	107
	Tim Lincecum	107
	Jerry Reuss	107
	James Shields	107
95	Kevin Appier	106
96	Juan Guzmán	105
	Mike Morgan	105
98	Larry Dierker	104
	Ervin Santana	104
	Al Spalding*	104
