= Peter Browning =

Peter Browning may refer to:

- Peter Browning, character in Inception
- Pete Browning (1861–1905), American baseball player
