= Jimmy Wolf =

American baseball player (1862–1903)

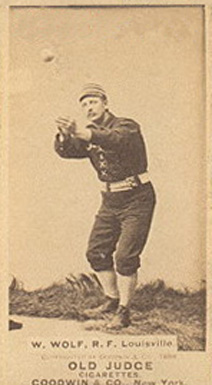
- Right fielder
- Born: May 12, 1862; Louisville, Kentucky, U.S.
- Died: May 16, 1903 (aged 41); Louisville, Kentucky, U.S.
- Batted: Right Threw: Right

MLB debut
- May 2, 1882, for the Louisville Eclipse

Last MLB appearance
- August 21, 1892, for the St. Louis Browns

MLB statistics
- Batting average: .290
- Home runs: 18
- Runs batted in: 592
- Stats at Baseball Reference

Teams
- As player: Louisville Eclipse/Colonels (1882–1891); St. Louis Browns (1892); As manager: Louisville Eclipse/Colonels (1889)

Career highlights and awards
- AA batting champion (1890); AA hits leader (1890)

William Van Winkle "Jimmy" Wolf (May 12, 1862 – May 16, 1903), also known as Chicken Wolf, was an American professional baseball player from Louisville, Kentucky. He played all or part of eleven seasons in Major League Baseball. He was primarily a right fielder, but occasionally played other positions in the infield.

Wolf played for his hometown team, the Louisville Colonels of the American Association, from 1882, when they were called the Eclipse, to 1891. He was the only player to appear in that league in all ten seasons of its existence. He set a number of career American Association records: most games, most plate appearances, most hits, most triples, most total bases.

There are various accounts as to how Wolf received the nickname of "Chicken" early in his baseball career. The most common account states that he ate too much stewed chicken before a game and then became sick on the field during the game. He is usually listed as "Chicken Wolf" in baseball literature, but for most of his career his teammates called him "Jimmy," and the local newspapers did the same.

When the American Association folded, Wolf played for the St. Louis Browns of the National League in 1892, his last season in the majors. He played in just three games for the Browns before being let go. He then played in the minor leagues until 1894 before retiring, at which point he began working as a firefighter back home in Louisville.

One of Wolf's best-known exploits stems from an incident that took place on August 22, 1886. Wolf hit an inside-the-park, walkoff home run against the Cincinnati Red Stockings. The Reds' outfielder, Abner Powell, might have been able to provide a different outcome except that he was impeded by an angry dog who had been sleeping next to the fence.

In 1889, with the team 2–8 after ten games under player-manager Dude Esterbrook, the managerial reins were handed over to Wolf, who was poorly suited to serve as a manager; he won only 14 of the 65 games he managed. The other two managers to follow, Dan Shannon and Jack Chapman, didn't fare any better, as Louisville won only 27 games that year with 111 losses. At the time, this meant that the 1889 Louisville Colonels season was the worst performance by a major league team in history. Jimmy Wolf did not play well and was lambasted in the local newspapers for having allowed himself to become seriously overweight. He was not expected to be a member of the team the next year. However, over the winter he exercised regularly and managed to get himself in good shape in time for the 1890 season.

That season, Wolf posted a batting average of .363, which won him the American Association's batting title. His stellar performance helped his team to win the league championship. In the process, the Colonels became the first team in major league history to go from "worst to first" in the span of one year. The remarkable story of this miracle team is recounted in a 2026 book, The 1890 Louisville Cyclones, written by Perry T. Cooper and published by McFarland & Company, Publishers. Jimmy Wolf features prominently in this book.

Wolf died in 1903 at the age of 41 from the effects of brain trauma he suffered a few years before in a fire-fighting accident. He is interred at Cave Hill Cemetery in Louisville. This cemetery is where other Louisville ballplayers have been buried as well, including childhood friend and teammate Pete Browning.

== See also ==
- List of Major League Baseball career stolen bases leaders
- List of Major League Baseball career triples leaders
- List of Major League Baseball player-managers
