= Kick Kelly =

American baseball umpire (1856–1926)

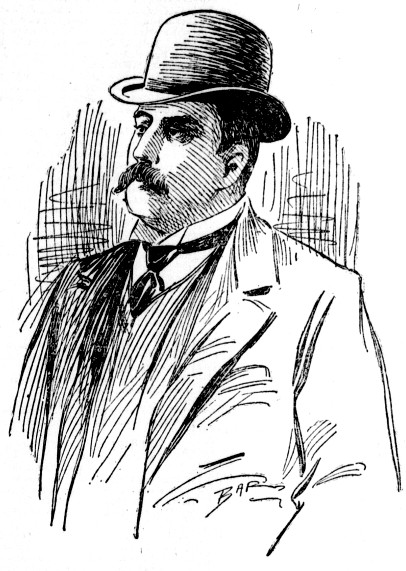
- Catcher/Manager/Umpire
- Born: October 31, 1856; New York City, U.S.
- Died: March 27, 1926 (aged 69); Malba, New York, U.S.
- Batted: Unknown Threw: Unknown

MLB debut
- May 1, 1879, for the Syracuse Stars

Last MLB appearance
- August 7, 1879, for the Troy Trojans

MLB statistics
- Batting average: .155
- Home runs: 0
- Runs batted in: 2
- Stats at Baseball Reference

Teams
- Syracuse Stars (1879); Troy Trojans (1879)

Career highlights and awards
- Set major league record for games as an umpire; Called two no-hitters

John O. "Kick" Kelly (October 31, 1856 – March 27, 1926), also nicknamed "Honest John" and "Diamond John", was an American catcher, manager and umpire in Major League Baseball who went on to become a boxing referee and to run gambling houses in his native New York City. He made a notable impact on the development of umpiring, helping to pioneer the use of multiple umpires in games in the 1880s. By the time he initially retired in 1888, he held the record for most games umpired in the major leagues (587); he returned to work the last two months of the 1897 season.

== Playing career ==
Kelly played just one season in the National League in 1879, split between two teams, the Syracuse Stars, for which he played in ten games, eight of them at catcher, and then another six games with the Troy Trojans. He played in 16 total games, had a .155 batting average, and scored five runs.

== Umpiring career ==
After his playing days were over, Kelly became an umpire, working games in both the National League and the American Association. He began in the NL in 1882, working 51 games, but then jumped to the American Association from 1883 to 1886. He returned to the NL in 1888. The early years of the major leagues were particularly hard on umpires, with hostile crowds and vicious arguments, in addition to the difficulty of constantly working games single-handedly. Few officials lasted more than two or three seasons, and by the end of the 1885 campaign Kelly had passed Billy McLean's total of 317 major league games as an umpire.

Among the highlights of his officiating career were calling two no-hitters. The first game came on September 20, 1882 when he called balls and strikes for Chicago White Stockings star pitcher Larry Corcoran, who tossed the second of his three career no-hitters, and on September 18, 1897 when future Hall of Famer Cy Young threw the first of his three career no-hitters.

Kelly's record of 587 career games as an umpire was broken by Bob Ferguson in 1890. He finished his umpiring career in 1897, after eight seasons and 626 games. At one point in his career, he departed to enjoy a short run as manager of the Louisville Colonels in 1887 and 1888. Following the 1887 season, Kelly and NL official John Gaffney officiated the 15-game World's Championship Series between the NL champion Detroit Wolverines and the AA champion St. Louis Browns. They devised a new system whereby one umpire would call balls and strikes behind the plate, while the other would make calls on the basepaths. The system was regarded as a great improvement over the 1886 attempt at the use of multiple umpires, in which two umpires were stationed behind the plate, with a third official – stationed behind the pitcher – who was allowed to intervene only to settle disagreements between the other two. In 1946, Kelly was one of 11 umpires named by the Baseball Hall of Fame to the Honor Rolls of Baseball.

== Managerial career ==
Kick Kelly began his managerial career in 1887 when he took over the field duties for the Colonels. He managed the entire season, and the team compiled a 76–60 record, which was good for fourth place in the American Association. He then began the 1888 season as their manager, but the team started with a record of 10–29, and owner/general manager Mordecai Davidson fired Kelly and put himself at the helm in an attempt to stop the losing streak of which his team was in the middle. He and John Kerins did not help that much, as the team finished in seventh place.

== Boxing career ==
Kelly became a championship boxing referee, officiating Jim Corbett's only successful defense of his heavyweight title against Charley Mitchell on January 25, 1894, in Jacksonville, Florida. In the second round, after Mitchell had begun the fight with constant slurs directed at Corbett, the champion landed a blow to Mitchell's head after he had been knocked to the mat. Mitchell's corner called for a foul, but the presence of numerous spectators brandishing guns and eager to defend their bets led Kelly to dismiss the complaint; he later confided that he had been lucky to leave Jacksonville alive. He also called the heavyweight fight between Corbett and Tom Sharkey on November 22, 1898, in New York, which ended in controversy when one of Corbett's cornermen jumped into the ring in the ninth round. Kelly announced that although Corbett had lost the fight on the foul, all bets were off. On July 3, 1899, in Buffalo, New York, Kelly refereed the bout in which Frank Erne won a 20-round decision to take the world lightweight title from Kid Lavigne.

Kelly died in Malba, Queens, at the age of 69, and is interred at the Calvary Cemetery in Woodside, New York.
