= Red Ehret =

American baseball player (1868–1940)

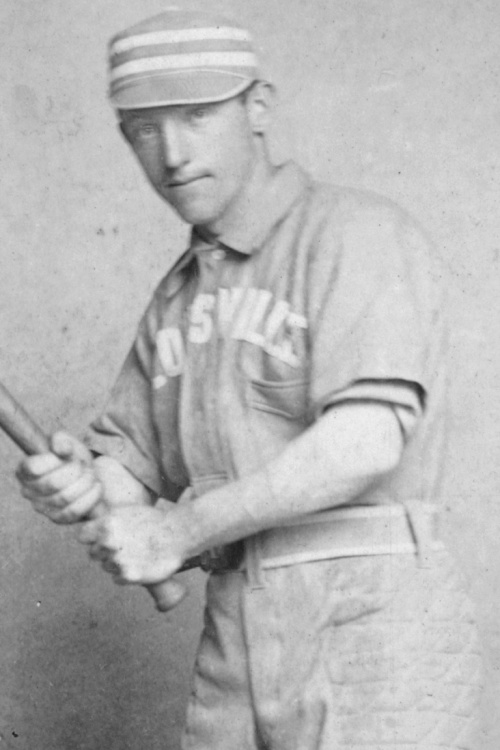
- Pitcher
- Born: August 31, 1868; Louisville, Kentucky, U.S.
- Died: July 28, 1940 (aged 71); Cincinnati, Ohio, U.S.
- Batted: Right Threw: Right

MLB debut
- July 7, 1888, for the Kansas City Cowboys

Last MLB appearance
- June 25, 1898, for the Louisville Colonels

MLB statistics
- Win–loss record: 139–167
- Earned run average: 4.02
- Strikeouts: 848
- Stats at Baseball Reference

Teams
- Kansas City Cowboys (1888); Louisville Colonels (1889–1891); Pittsburgh Pirates (1892–1894); St. Louis Browns (1895); Cincinnati Reds (1896–1897); Louisville Colonels (1898)

Philip Sydney "Red" Ehret (August 31, 1868 – July 28, 1940) was an American Major League Baseball pitcher who played from 1888 to 1898 for the Kansas City Cowboys, Louisville Colonels, Pittsburgh Pirates, St. Louis Browns, and Cincinnati Reds.

Ehret was the son of immigrants from Germany. He was born in Louisville, Kentucky, and after starting his major league career with the Kansas City Cowboys, he returned home to Louisville when the Louisville Colonels purchased his contract on 8 March 1889. The 1889 Louisville Colonels season was a dismal one, as the Colonels finished in last place, but the following year Ehret won 25 games and helped the team vault from last place to first place. The 1890 Louisville Colonels season was historic, in that it was the first time a major league club had gone from "worst to first." This remarkable accomplishment is celebrated in The 1890 Louisville Cyclones, a 2026 book written by Perry T. Cooper and published by McFarland & Company, Publishers. Red Ehret is prominently featured in this book.

Ehret had an 11-year career in the major leagues, and he continued to pitch in the minor leagues for many years after he dropped out of the majors. He won 139 major league games while losing 167. He was a tough competitor who hit so many batters with pitches that he twice led all major league pitchers in that category. He also drank heavily. The Sporting Life, a weekly sports journal, wrote in its 3 October 1893 issue that Ehret was the worst alcoholic in the major leagues.

Ehret was destitute when he died at age 71 in a Cincinnati, Ohio home for indigents. The local mayor, James Garfield Stewart, had as a boy seen Ehret pitch, so for sentimental reasons the mayor paid for Ehret's burial in the Baltimore Pike Cemetery.
