= Bill Anderson (1880s pitcher) =

American baseball player (1865–1936)

- Pitcher
- Born: January 19, 1865; Spencer County, Kentucky
- Died: May 5, 1936 (aged 71); Taylorsville, Kentucky
- Batted: Unknown Threw: Unknown

MLB debut
- August 12, 1889, for the Louisville Colonels

Last MLB appearance
- August 12, 1889, for the Louisville Colonels

MLB statistics
- Win–loss record: 0–1
- Earned run average: 10.12
- Strikeouts: 2
- Stats at Baseball Reference

Teams
- Louisville Colonels (1889)

William Anderson (January 19, 1865 – May 5, 1936) was an American professional baseball player who played in one game for the Louisville Colonels in 1889. In that game, he pitched a complete game, and surrendered nine earned runs in a loss to the Philadelphia Athletics. As a hitter in that game, he collected a base hit in three at bats for a .333 batting average.

The story of Bill Anderson's lone appearance in a major-league game is an amusing one. Bill Anderson was not really a professional athlete; he usually pitched for an amateur team. But he was acquainted with one of the best players on the roster of the Louisville Colonels, pitcher Scott Stratton, because Stratton was courting Bill's sister, Bessie.

The Colonels were suffering through a miserable season in 1889, and injuries had decimated their pitching staff. A doubleheader was coming up. Stratton asked club officials if he could bring his friend Bill to Louisville to pitch one of the games in the doubleheader. Permission was granted, so Bill Anderson found himself pitching against the Philadelphia Athletics on 12 August 1889. When quizzed by the local sportswriters before the game, he told them that his name was Robinson. He struggled against the major-league hitters, and at one point he threw a wild pitch that broke his catcher's finger. But he persevered, finished the game and got his name in the major league record books.

Bill Anderson died in 1936 at the age of 71. His remained are interred at Valley Cemetery in Taylorsville, Kentucky.
