= Mike Gaule =

American baseball player (1869–1918)

- Outfielder
- Born: August 4, 1869; Baltimore, Maryland, U.S.
- Died: January 24, 1918 (aged 48); Baltimore, Maryland, U.S.
- Batted: Left Threw: Left

MLB debut
- June 15, 1889, for the Louisville Colonels

Last MLB appearance
- June 15, 1889, for the Louisville Colonels

MLB statistics
- Batting average: .000
- At bats: 2
- Hits: 0
- Stats at Baseball Reference

Teams
- Louisville Colonels 1889

Michael John Gaule (August 4, 1869 – January 24, 1918) was an American professional baseball player. He played in one game for the Louisville Colonels of the American Association in 1889.

A local semi-pro player who had played a couple of seasons of minor league baseball, Gaule served as a replacement player when several members of the Colonels refused to play in protest of owner Mordecai Davidson's failure to pay them. He was born in Baltimore, Maryland and died there at the age of 48.
