= Walter Fisher (baseball) =

American baseball player

- Outfielder
- Born: April 17, 1867; Baltimore, Maryland, U.S.
- Died: May 26, 1921 (aged 54); Baltimore, Maryland, U.S.
- Batted: Unknown Threw: Unknown

MLB debut
- June 15, 1889, for the Louisville Colonels

Last MLB appearance
- June 15, 1889, for the Louisville Colonels

MLB statistics
- Batting average: .500
- At bats: 2
- Hits: 1
- Stats at Baseball Reference

Teams
- Louisville Colonels (1899)

Walter William Fisher (April 12, 1867 – May 26, 1921) was an American professional baseball player. He played in one game on June 15, 1889, for the Louisville Colonels of the American Association. A local semi-pro player, he served as a replacement player when several members of the Colonels refused to play in protest of owner Mordecai Davidson's failure to pay them.

Fisher was misidentified by baseball historians as "Charles Fisher" for years until 2023.
