= Ed Springer =

American baseball player (1867–1891)

- Pitcher
- Born: 1867; Oil Springs, Ontario, Canada
- Died: December 17, 1891; Minneapolis, Minnesota
- Batted: Unknown Threw: Unknown

MLB debut
- July 12, 1889, for the Louisville Colonels

Last MLB appearance
- July 12, 1889, for the Louisville Colonels

MLB statistics
- Win–loss record: 0-1
- Earned run average: 9.00
- Strikeouts: 1
- Stats at Baseball Reference

Teams
- Louisville Colonels (1889)

Edward Ellsworth Springer (1867 – December 17, 1891) was a Major League Baseball pitcher. He played in the majors for the Louisville Colonels of the American Association during the 1889 season. He appeared in one game for the Colonels, pitching five innings on July 12, 1889.
