= Harry Raymond (baseball) =

American baseball player (1862–1925)

- Third baseman
- Born: February 20, 1862; Utica, New York, U.S.
- Died: March 21, 1925 (aged 63); San Diego, California, U.S.
- Batted: Unknown Threw: Unknown

MLB debut
- September 9, 1888, for the Louisville Colonels

Last MLB appearance
- June 20, 1892, for the Washington Senators

MLB statistics
- Batting average: .235
- Home runs: 2
- Runs scored: 167
- Stats at Baseball Reference

Teams
- Louisville Colonels (1888–1891); Pittsburgh Pirates (1892); Washington Senators (1892)

Harry H. Raymond (born as John M. Truman, February 20, 1862 – March 21, 1925), nicknamed "Jack", was an American Major League Baseball player who played infield from 1888-1892. He would play for the Louisville Colonels, Washington Senators, and Pittsburgh Pirates.

Raymond was a very good defensive player, but a poor hitter. He was popular with the press and with most of his teammates, and he served as the captain of the Louisville Colonels in 1890. The 1890 Louisville Colonels season was historic, as the Colonels became the first major league team to vault from last place to first place in the span of one year. That achievement is chronicled in a 2026 book, The 1890 Louisville Cyclones, written by Perry T. Cooper and published by McFarland & Company, Publishers. Harry Raymond is prominently featured in this book, though he is generally depicted in a negative manner due to some of his questionable habits, both personal and professional.

After his major league career ended, Raymond played in the minor leagues until 1899. By the early 1920s he had become involved in a mining operation in Nevada. He died suddenly in San Diego, California.
