= Phil Tomney =

American baseball player (1863–1892)

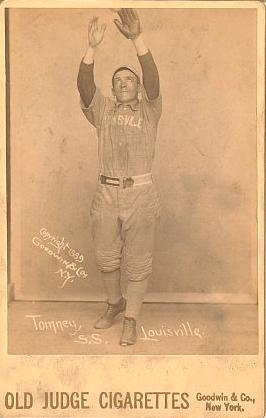
- Shortstop
- Born: June 17, 1863; Reading, Pennsylvania, US
- Died: March 18, 1892 (aged 28); Reading, Pennsylvania, US
- Batted: Right Threw: Right

MLB debut
- September 7, 1888, for the Louisville Colonels

Last MLB appearance
- October 14, 1890, for the Louisville Colonels

MLB statistics
- Batting average: .232
- Home runs: 5
- RBIs: 100
- Stats at Baseball Reference

Teams
- Louisville Colonels (1888–1890)

Philip H. "Buster" Tomney (July 17, 1863 – March 18, 1892) was an American professional baseball player for a period of nine seasons, three of which were at the major league level with the Louisville Colonels of the American Association from 1888 to 1890.

Tomney was the starting shortstop for the Louisville club in 1889 and 1890. In 1889 the club finished in last place; in 1890 it finished in first place. This sudden ascension was historic; the Louisville Colonels were the first team in major league history to move from last place to first place in the span of one year. The club's remarkable achievement is chronicled in a 2026 book, The 1890 Louisville Cyclones, by Perry T. Cooper. Phil Tomney is prominently featured in this book, which shows that he was the most productive shortstop in the American Association in 1890, despite the fact that sportswriters of the era regularly derided him for his tiny stature.

Tomney died in his hometown of Reading, Pennsylvania in 1892 at the age of 28 due to a lung infection brought on by pulmonary phithisis (tuberculosis). He is interred at Aulenbach's Cemetery in Mount Penn, Pennsylvania.
