= Michael McDermott (baseball) =

American baseball player (1864–1947)

- Pitcher
- Born: May 6, 1864; Fall River, Massachusetts, U.S.
- Died: May 7, 1947 (aged 83); Fall River, Massachusetts, U.S.
- Batted: Unknown Threw: Right

MLB debut
- September 2, 1889, for the Louisville Colonels

Last MLB appearance
- October 13, 1889, for the Louisville Colonels

MLB statistics
- Win–loss record: 1-8
- Earned run average: 4.16
- Strikeouts: 22
- Stats at Baseball Reference

Teams
- Louisville Colonels (1889)

Michael H. McDermott (May 6, 1864 – May 7, 1947) was an American pitcher in Major League Baseball who played for the Louisville Colonels of the American Association during the 1889 season. Besides, he spent parts of six seasons in the minor leagues between 1885 and 1892, primarily in the New England League.
