= Scott Stratton =

American baseball player (1869–1939)

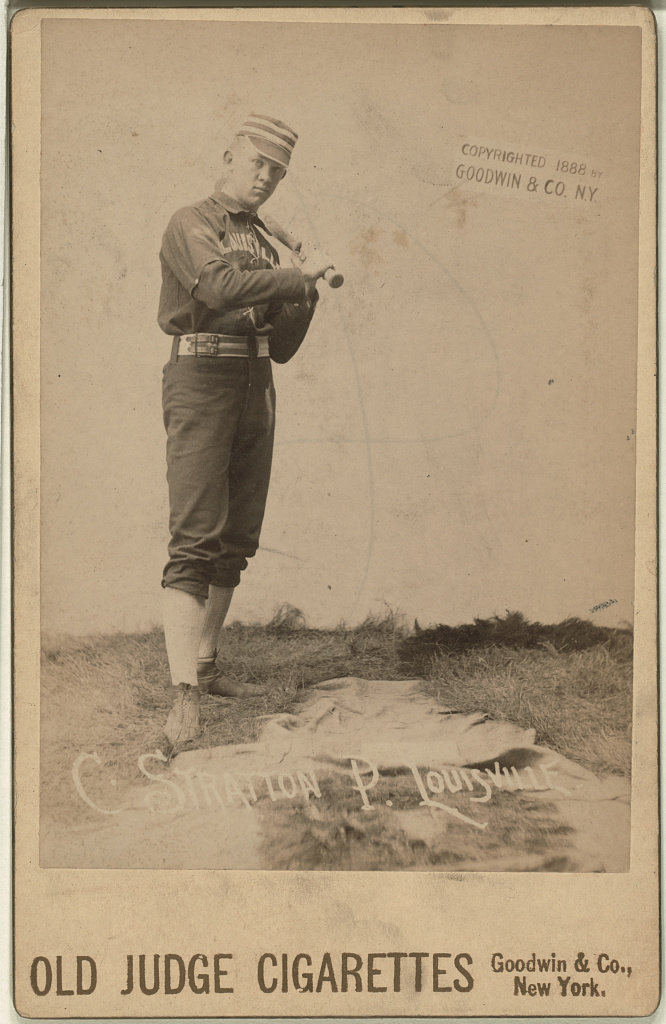
- 1888 baseball card of Stratton
- Pitcher / Outfielder
- Born: October 2, 1869; Campbellsburg, Kentucky, U.S.
- Died: March 8, 1939 (aged 69); Louisville, Kentucky, U.S.
- Batted: Left Threw: Right

MLB debut
- April 21, 1888, for the Louisville Colonels

Last MLB appearance
- July 2, 1895, for the Chicago Colts

MLB statistics
- Win–loss record: 97–114
- Earned run average: 3.87
- Strikeouts: 570
- Batting average: .274
- Stats at Baseball Reference

Teams
- Louisville Colonels (1888–1891); Pittsburgh Pirates (1891); Louisville Colonels (1892–1894); Chicago Colts (1894–1895)

Career highlights and awards
- AA ERA leader (1890)

Chilton Scott Stratton (October 2, 1869 – March 8, 1939) was an American pitcher and outfielder in Major League Baseball from 1888 to 1895. He played for the Louisville Colonels, Pittsburgh Pirates, and Chicago Colts.

== Biography ==
Stratton was born in Campbellsburg, Kentucky, in 1869. He started his professional baseball career in 1888, when at age 18 he walked into the Louisville Colonels spring training camp and asked for a tryout. He performed so well that he was immediately given a contract. Primarily a pitcher, Stratton sometimes played in the outfield on days he didn't pitch because he possessed outstanding hitting and fielding skills.

Stratton was a Sabbatarian. Accordingly, he asked to be allowed to skip all Sunday baseball games. The team refused that request in his first season, with the result that he played on Sundays that year, but afterward he threatened to retire from baseball unless permitted to follow his religious convictions. From 1889 on, it was therefore written into his contract that he was not required to play on Sundays.

The 1889 Louisville Colonels season was a miserable one in which the Colonels finished in last place and became the first major league team to lose 100+ games (they lost 111). Stratton won only three games that year and considered quitting in the offseason. But the team then staged an incredible turnaround, winning the American Association's 1890 pennant. This was the first time a major league team had vaulted from "worst to first," an achievement which is chronicled in a 2026 book, The 1890 Louisville Cyclones, written by Perry T. Cooper and published by McFarland & Company, Publishers.

Scott Stratton is featured prominently in this book, which acknowledges that his performance was a major factor in the Colonels' success. Only 20 years old at the time, he had 431 innings pitched, a 34–14 win–loss record, a 2.36 earned run average (ERA), a 164 ERA+, and 207 strikeouts. He led the American Association in Wins Above Replacement, ERA and ERA+, and he set a major league record by starting 25 consecutive games that his team won. If there had been a Most Valuable Player award at the time, Stratton would surely have won it.

Unfortunately, by the end of the 1890 season, overwork had damaged Stratton's pitching shoulder. A physician who examined his shoulder after the season stated that Stratton would probably never be able to pitch again. That proved incorrect, but it was true that Stratton was never again as effective as he'd been in 1890, though he did win 21 games in 1892. His major league career ended in 1895 with a 97–114 record, a 3.87 ERA, 570 strikeouts, and a .274 batting average. Afterwards, he played in the minor leagues as an outfielder until 1900.

Stratton courted a young woman named Bessie Anderson as a teenager. Her father disapproved of the relationship, even after Stratton managed to talk the Colonels into letting Bessie's brother, Bill Anderson, pitch a major league game in 1889. Scott and Bessie therefore eloped on 26 January 1890.

Stratton died suddenly of an apparent heart attack in Louisville, Kentucky, in 1939.

== See also ==
- List of Major League Baseball annual ERA leaders
- List of Major League Baseball single-season wins leaders
