= John Traffley =

American baseball player (1862–1900)

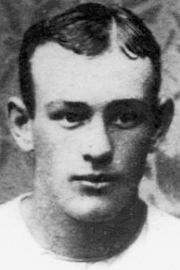
- Outfielder
- Born: 1862; Chicago, Illinois, U.S.
- Died: May 15, 1900 (aged 37–38); Baltimore, Maryland, U.S.
- Batted: Unknown Threw: Unknown

MLB debut
- June 15, 1889, for the Louisville Colonels

Last MLB appearance
- June 15, 1889, for the Louisville Colonels

MLB statistics
- At bats: 2
- RBI: 0
- Home runs: 0
- Batting average: .500
- Stats at Baseball Reference

Teams
- Louisville Colonels (1889)

John M. Traffley (1862 – May 15, 1900) was an American professional baseball player who played for the 1889 Louisville Colonels. He appeared in one game for the Colonels, on June 15, 1889, as an outfielder. His brother, Bill Traffley, also played professional baseball. He got his chance to play for the Colonels because some of the regular ballplayers were on strike.
