= Fred Carl (baseball) =

American baseball player (1858–1899)

Frederick E. Carl
- Outfielder
- Born: September 8, 1858; Baltimore, Maryland, U.S.
- Died: January 13, 1899 (aged 40); Baltimore, Maryland, U.S.
- Batted: Left Threw: Left

MLB debut
- July 25, 1889, for the Louisville Colonels

Last MLB appearance
- August 31, 1889, for the Louisville Colonels

MLB statistics
- At bats: 99
- RBI: 13
- Home Runs: 0
- Batting average: .202
- Stats at Baseball Reference

Teams
- Louisville Colonels 1889

Frederick E. Carl (September 8, 1858 – January 13, 1899) was an American professional baseball player who played in 25 games for the Louisville Colonels during the 1889 season. He was born in Baltimore, Maryland and died there at the age of 40.
