= Harry Scherer =

American baseball player (1868–1897)

- Outfielder
- Born: 1868; Baltimore, Maryland, US
- Died: 2 April 1897 (aged 28–29); New York City, US
- Batted: Unknown Threw: Unknown

MLB debut
- July 24, 1889, for the Louisville Colonels

Last MLB appearance
- July 24, 1889, for the Louisville Colonels

MLB statistics
- At bats: 3
- RBI: 0
- Home Runs: 0
- Batting average: .333
- Stats at Baseball Reference

Teams
- Louisville Colonels (1899)

Harry Edward Scherer (1868 in Baltimore, Maryland – 2 April 1897 in New York City) was an American professional baseball player who played for the 1889 Louisville Colonels. He appeared in one game for the Colonels as an outfielder on July 24, 1889. He died on April 2, 1897
