= Ed Flanagan (baseball) =

American baseball player (1861–1926)

- First baseman
- Born: September 15, 1861; Lowell, Massachusetts, U.S.
- Died: November 10, 1926 (aged 65); Lowell, Massachusetts, U.S.
- Batted: Unknown Threw: Right

MLB debut
- April 16, 1887, for the Philadelphia Athletics

Last MLB appearance
- October 8, 1889, for the Louisville Colonels

MLB statistics
- Batting average: .250
- Hits: 168
- Runs batted in: 23
- Stats at Baseball Reference

Teams
- Philadelphia Athletics (1887); Louisville Colonels (1889)

Edward F. Flanagan (September 15, 1861 – November 10, 1926) was an American professional baseball player who played first base in the Major Leagues during the 1887 and 1889 seasons. He played in the minor leagues through 1899.
