= John Galligan =

American baseball player (1865–1937)

- Outfielder
- Born: June 1865; Easton, Pennsylvania, U.S.
- Died: August 22, 1937 (aged 72); Bronx, New York, U.S.
- Batted: Unknown Threw: Unknown

MLB debut
- September 2, 1889, for the Louisville Colonels

Last MLB appearance
- October 14, 1889, for the Louisville Colonels

MLB statistics
- At bats: 120
- RBI: 7
- Home runs: 0
- Batting average: .167
- Stats at Baseball Reference

Teams
- Louisville Colonels 1899

John T. Galligan (June 1865 – August 22, 1937) was an American professional baseball player who played for the 1889 Louisville Colonels.
