= Jim Rogers (baseball) =

American baseball player and manager (1872–1900)

- Infielder / Manager
- Born: April 9, 1872; Hartford, Connecticut, U.S.
- Died: January 21, 1900 (aged 27); Bridgeport, Connecticut, U.S.
- Batted: Unknown Threw: Unknown

MLB debut
- April 17, 1896, for the Washington Senators

Last MLB appearance
- June 15, 1897, for the Louisville Colonels

MLB statistics
- Batting average: .236
- Home runs: 3
- Runs batted in: 90
- Stats at Baseball Reference

Teams
- As player: Washington Senators (1896); Louisville Colonels (1896–1897); As manager: Louisville Colonels (1897)

James F. Rogers (April 9, 1872 – January 21, 1900) was an American Major League Baseball player and manager born in Hartford, Connecticut. He was an infielder for two different Major League Baseball teams, the 1896 Washington Senators and the 1896 – 1897 Louisville Colonels.

== Career ==
Jim began his major league career with the 1896 Washington Senators of the National League, and split time between second base and third, hitting .279, driving in 30 runs, in 38 games played. On July 3 of that year, the Senators traded him, along with Jack Crooks and $1000 to the Louisville Colonels, also of the National League, for John O'Brien.

He hit .259 for Louisville that season, splitting his playing time at first base and second base. The following season, his last in the Majors, he began the season as player-manager, but was released on June 16, after 44 games and a 17–24 record. He signed the following day with the Pittsburgh Pirates, but did not play.

== Post-career ==
Rogers died at the age of 27 in Bridgeport, Connecticut, and is interred at St. Michael's Cemetery in nearby Stratford. The cause of death was never released to the public. It was reported in the Jan 6, 1900, issue of The Sporting Life that Rogers death was caused by a brain injury sustained from being hit by a pitched ball earlier in his career.

== See also ==
- List of baseball players who died during their careers
- List of Major League Baseball player–managers
