= Jack Chapman (baseball) =

American baseball player and manager (1843–1916)

- Outfielder / Manager
- Born: May 8, 1843; Brooklyn, New York, U.S.
- Died: June 10, 1916 (aged 73); Brooklyn, New York, U.S.
- Batted: Unknown Threw: Right

MLB debut
- May 5, 1874, for the Brooklyn Atlantics

Last MLB appearance
- August 8, 1876, for the Louisville Grays

MLB statistics
- Batting average: .246
- Runs scored: 64
- Runs batted in: 59
- Stats at Baseball Reference

Teams
- National Association of Base Ball Players Enterprise of Brooklyn (1860–1861) Brooklyn Atlantics (1862–1866, 1868–1870) Quaker City of Philadelphia (1867) League player Brooklyn Atlantics (1874) St. Louis Brown Stockings (1875) Louisville Grays (1876) League manager Louisville Grays (1876–1877) Milwaukee Grays (1878) Worcester Worcesters (1882) Detroit Wolverines (1883–1884) Buffalo Bisons (NL) (1885) Louisville Colonels (1889–1892)

Career highlights and awards
- American Association pennant (1890)

John Curtis Chapman (May 8, 1843 – June 10, 1916) was an American Major League Baseball player and manager who was born in Brooklyn, New York. He began playing for Brooklyn-area semi-professional baseball clubs while in his teens. In 1870, he was playing for the powerful Brooklyn Atlantics when the undefeated Cincinnati Red Stockings came to Brooklyn for a game. The Red Stockings had never lost a game to that point, but suffered their first-ever loss when the Atlantics beat them. Chapman was Brooklyn's cleanup hitter in that game. He later played in the National Association as an outfielder for the 1874 Brooklyn Atlantics and the 1875 St. Louis Brown Stockings. In 1876, when the National League formed, he became the player-manager for the Louisville Grays. The following season saw him staying with Louisville in the manager role only. After the 1877 season, the Louisville team was expelled from the National League because four of its players had purposely lost games at the behest of gamblers. Chapman then became manager of the Milwaukee Grays. The team had a poor record, and he was fired.

In all, he managed 11 seasons in the majors, compiling a record of 351 wins and 502 losses. He won one championship, in 1890 with the Louisville Colonels of the American Association. The 1890 championship was historic; the Louisville club had finished in last place in the American Association in 1889, so by finishing in first place in 1890, the club became the first major-league club in history to go from last place to first place in the span of a single year. Chapman and his pennant-winning club then took part in the 1890 World Series, the seventh of eight held prior to the first modern Series in 1903. The team faced the Brooklyn Bridegrooms of the National League in what was planned as a best-of-seven series. Brooklyn won the first two games before the third game ended in an eight inning tie. Louisville won two out of the next three to force a seventh game amidst worsening weather conditions. Chapman and Brooklyn manager Bill McGunnigle agreed that the October 28 game would be the last one held, although it was stated that if Louisville won the game and tied the series that they would meet again in the following spring to determine the true winner. Louisville won 6–2, but the agreement between the AA and the NL floundered in the winter, meaning that no true winner of the 1890 Series was awarded that year.

A major league player named Bob Ferguson was a contemporary of Chapman's. Ferguson was given the nickname "Death to Flying Things," and some sources state that Chapman was also known by that nickname, but Richard Hershberger, a researcher for the Society for American Baseball Research, looked into the matter and determined that the nickname was never applied to Chapman during his baseball career; it was bestowed upon him by a sportswriter many years later.

Chapman was a lifelong bachelor. He died in Brooklyn at the age of 73. He is interred at Green-Wood Cemetery.

Chapman's managerial career is documented extensively in The 1890 Louisville Cyclones, a 2026 book written by Perry T. Cooper and published by McFarland & Company, Publishers. The book chronicles the Louisville club's achievement of moving from last place to first place in a year's time, and lauds Chapman for his performance as the team's manager during that historic season.

== See also ==
- List of Major League Baseball player-managers

Preceded by Frank Bancroft	Detroit Wolverines manager 1883–1884	Succeeded by Charlie Morton
Preceded by Dan Shannon	Louisville Colonels manager 1889–1892	Succeeded by Fred Pfeffer
