= Dude Esterbrook =

American baseball player (1857–1901)

- Third baseman
- Born: June 20, 1857; Staten Island, New York, U.S.
- Died: April 20, 1901 (aged 43); Middletown, New York, U.S.
- Batted: Right Threw: Right

MLB debut
- May 1, 1880, for the Buffalo Bisons

Last MLB appearance
- July 22, 1891, for the Brooklyn Grooms

MLB statistics
- Batting average: .261
- Runs batted in: 210
- Stolen bases: 55
- Stats at Baseball Reference

Teams
- As player: Buffalo Bisons (1880); Cleveland Blues (1882); New York Metropolitans (1883–1884); New York Giants (1885–1886); New York Metropolitans (1887); Indianapolis Hoosiers (1888); Louisville Colonels (1888–1889); New York Giants (1890); Brooklyn Grooms (1891); As manager: Louisville Colonels (1889)

Thomas John "Dude" Esterbrook (June 20, 1857 – April 30, 1901) was an American Major League Baseball player from Staten Island, New York who played the majority of his games at third base, but did play many games at first base. Esterbrook played for seven different teams during his 11-year career, and had his biggest success in 1884, while playing for the New York Metropolitans, when he batted .314, and was among the leaders in many other batting categories.

In 1889, Esterbrook was named the manager, or "Captain" as it was known then, of the Louisville Colonels. After only ten games, and only two wins, the team owner determined that due to the team's record and his manager's confrontational behavior, Esterbrook would be fired and replaced by Jimmy Wolf.

Esterbrook was taken on the Erie Railroad's Mountain Express on April 30, 1901 to go to the State Hospital at Middletown. Diagnosed with neurasthenia, Esterbrook's family arranged for him to go to the asylum for treatment and a hospital attendant, Henry Sangstacken, would be his chaperone to the asylum along with his brother, Joseph Esterbrook. After passing Tuxedo station, Esterbrook asked Sangstacken to bring him to the smoking car so he could use the restroom. Sangstacken watched him the door partially open, but Esterbrook pushed the door open and broke the lock and injured the attendant. After escaping the bathroom, he climbed through a window on the train and jumped head first on to the ballast below. The train operator brought the train back to where Esterbrook jumped, with the former player laying unconscious and bleeding. Esterbrook was brought back aboard and taken to Thrall Hospital in Middletown. At Thrall Hospital, a doctor diagnosed the former player with a skull fracture, lacerations and a fractured finger. Esterbrook died at 6:45 p.m. He is buried at Green-Wood Cemetery in Brooklyn, New York.

== See also ==
- List of Major League Baseball player–managers

Preceded by John Kerins	Louisville Colonels Managers; 1889	Succeeded by Jimmy Wolf
