= Tony Mullane =

American baseball player (1859–1944)

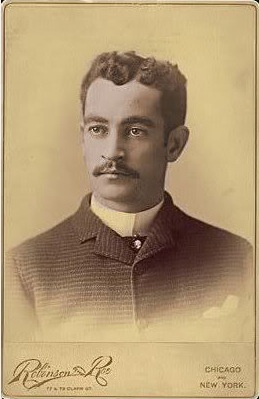
- Pitcher
- Born: January 30, 1859; County Cork, Ireland
- Died: April 25, 1944 (aged 85); Chicago, Illinois, U.S.
- Batted: Switch Threw: Switch

MLB debut
- August 27, 1881, for the Detroit Wolverines

Last MLB appearance
- July 26, 1894, for the Cleveland Spiders

MLB statistics
- Win–loss record: 284–220
- Earned run average: 3.05
- Strikeouts: 1,803
- Stats at Baseball Reference

Teams
- Detroit Wolverines (1881); Louisville Eclipse (1882); St. Louis Browns (1883); Toledo Blue Stockings (1884); Cincinnati Red Stockings/Reds (1886–1893); Baltimore Orioles (1893–1894); Cleveland Spiders (1894)

Career highlights and awards
- AA strikeout leader (1882); Pitched a no-hitter on September 11, 1882; Cincinnati Reds Hall of Fame

Anthony John Mullane (January 30, 1859 – April 25, 1944), nicknamed "Count" and "the Apollo of the Box", was an American professional baseball player who pitched for seven major league teams during 1881–1894. He is best known as a switch pitcher who could throw with either hand, and for having one of the highest career win totals of pitchers not in the Baseball Hall of Fame.

== Career ==
Born in County Cork, Ireland, Mullane emigrated to the United States in 1864. He made his major league debut with the Detroit Wolverines on August 27, 1881, picking up his first career win 9–1 over the Chicago White Stockings.

Mullane suffered an injury to his right arm and managed to teach himself to throw left handed. He resumed throwing right handed once the injury healed, and he even alternated throwing right handed and left handed in the same game, which was easy for him since he did not wear a glove. Mullane faced the batter with both hands on the ball, and then would use either one to throw a pitch. (It was over one hundred years before another ambidextrous pitcher, Greg A. Harris, using a special ambidextrous glove, was permitted to switch-pitch in one game shortly before he retired with the Montreal Expos. Harris was the only pitcher to do so in the 20th century. He had spent most of his career prohibited by the Boston Red Sox from pitching left handed.)

In 1882, Mullane moved on to the American Association and joined the Louisville Eclipse, where he started 55 of the team's 80 games and compiled a record of 30–24 with a 1.88 earned run average, the first of five consecutive 30-win seasons. On September 11, he pitched a no-hitter against the Cincinnati Red Stockings. He recorded 35 victories with the 1883 St. Louis Browns.

In 1884, Mullane attempted to sign with the St. Louis Maroons of the Union Association, a new independent league, even though under the reserve clause the Browns still had rights to his services. Threatened with banishment for defying his contract, Mullane relented. The Browns then sold him to the expansion Toledo Blue Stockings, with whom he won a career-high 36 games. That season, Mullane was teamed up with catcher Moses Fleetwood Walker, one of the first black men to play in Major League Baseball. Mullane stated Walker "was the best catcher I ever worked with, but I disliked a Negro and whenever I had to pitch to him I used to pitch anything I wanted without looking at his signals." This helped contribute to Mullane's league-leading 63 wild pitches that season.

The Browns attempted to reclaim Mullane after the 1884 season when both the Union Association and the Blue Stockings folded, but before the Browns could re-sign him under the rules, Mullane managed to sign with Cincinnati. For this action, the American Association suspended him for the entire 1885 season. Coming in the midst of his string of consecutive 30-win seasons, this may have cost Mullane a 300-win career.

Following the suspension, Mullane joined the Cincinnati Red Stockings for the 1886 season and remained there for the next seven and a half years, over which he won 163 games. At the plate, in 1889 he recorded career-highs with a .296 batting average, a slugging percentage of .418, and 24 stolen bases in 196 at-bats.

The 1893 season brought several rules changes, most notably the moving of the pitcher's mound an additional five feet from home plate. Mullane began the season a mediocre 6–6, and was traded to the Baltimore Orioles on June 16. He staggered to an 18–25 record with the Orioles in a little more than one full season over 1893 and 1894. Mullane set a dubious record on June 18, 1894, by allowing 16 runs in the first inning of a game against the Boston Beaneaters. A month later he was traded again, this time to the Cleveland Spiders, for whom he played only four games.

Mullane left the majors after the 1894 season with a record of 284–220 and a 3.05 ERA over a 13-year career. He played in the minor leagues on and off from 1895 to 1902. He also worked five games as an umpire. His 284 wins tie him with Ferguson Jenkins for 27th on the all-time list; he is fourth among eligible pitchers not in the Hall of Fame, behind only Roger Clemens (354), Bobby Mathews (297) and Tommy John (288). Mullane still holds the record for the most wild pitches in major league history, with 343.

== Post-career ==
Mullane's grave at Holy Sepulchre Cemetery

After his baseball career, Mullane joined the Chicago Police Department, from which he retired in 1924. Mullane died at the age of 85 in Chicago, and is interred in grave 2, lot 48, block 5, section 58 at Holy Sepulchre Catholic Cemetery located in Alsip, Illinois. He was inducted into the Cincinnati Reds Hall of Fame in 2010.

== See also ==
- List of Major League Baseball career wins leaders
- List of Major League Baseball career wild pitches leaders
- List of Major League Baseball annual strikeout leaders
- List of Major League Baseball annual shutout leaders
- List of Major League Baseball annual saves leaders
- List of Major League Baseball no-hitters

Achievements
Preceded by Harry Wright	All-Time Saves Leader; 1894–1903 (shared with Nichols 1899–1903)	Succeeded by Kid Nichols
Preceded by Pud Galvin	No-hitter pitcher September 11, 1882	Succeeded by Guy Hecker
