= Eclipse Park =

Baseball grounds in Louisville, Kentucky

Coordinates: 38.2405°N 85.76496°W

- Interactive map of Eclipse Park
- Former names: Eclipse Park I (c.1874–1893); Eclipse Park II (1893–1899); Eclipse Park III (1902–1922)
- Location: 28th and Elliott streets (I); 28th and Broadway (II); 7th and Kentucky (III); Louisville, Kentucky

Tenants
- Louisville Eclipse/Colonels (AA/NL) (1882–1899); Louisville Colonels (MiLB) (1902–1922); Louisville Breckenridges Club (Ind) (c.1899–1906); Louisville Breckenridges (Ind./NFL) (1907–1922); Louisville Cardinals (NCAA) (1909–1912, 1920–1922)

Eclipse Park was the name of three successive baseball grounds in Louisville, Kentucky in the late 19th and early 20th centuries. They were the home of the Louisville baseball team first known as the Louisville Eclipse and later as the Louisville Colonels.

The unusual name for these ballparks derived from the original name of the Association club, the Eclipse. The more local name "Colonels" eventually won out. Nonetheless, "Eclipse" was among the early team names to be a singular word, despite "sounding like" a plural.

Semi-pro baseball had been played at the first Eclipse Park as early as 1874. The Louisville Eclipse played there from 1882 to 1884. The team was then renamed the Louisville Colonels and continued to play under that name from 1885 to 1893. The team was a member of the American Association until 1891 when it joined the National League when the American Association folded. The park was destroyed by fire on September 27, 1892. The 1893 season started in what was left of the park.

Eclipse Park I in 1892

The original Eclipse Park was located at 28th and Elliott streets in west Louisville.

Eclipse Park II in 1905

The second Eclipse Park was built a block south of the original. City directories and local newspapers give the location as 28th Street (east) and Broadway (north). The Louisville Colonels played there from early in the 1893 season until well into the 1899 season. This is the ground at which Hall of Famer Honus Wagner made his Major League debut on July 19, 1897.

The second Eclipse Park was destroyed by fire on August 12, 1899. The club was on a road trip at the time. They returned to a partially-rebuilt park ten days later, but the stands were inadequate and the club played the final month as a road team.

The fire contributed significantly to the once-strong Louisville club being contracted after the end of the season. Team owner Barney Dreyfuss moved on to acquire the Pittsburgh Pirates. Instead of being scattered to the wind, the best players from the Louisville team roster were brought onto the Pittsburgh payroll, including Wagner, third baseman Tommy Leach, outfielder-manager Fred Clarke, and ace right-hander Deacon Phillippe. This influx of talent soon turned the perennial cellar-dwelling Pirates into a three-peat pennant winner, and a participant in the first modern World Series.

After a one-year absence of professional ball, a Louisville Colonels entry in the Western Association opened at the remnants of the park in 1901. The club drew poorly and transferred to Grand Rapids, Michigan near the end of June.

Eclipse Park III in 1905

The third and final Eclipse Park was built on a block bounded by 7th Street (east); Kentucky Street (south); 8th Street (west); and Florence Place (north) in the Limerick neighborhood of Louisville. This ballpark was built by George "White Wings" Tebeau as the home for the American Association minor league Louisville Colonels who played there from 1902 through 1922.

The final Eclipse Park had better luck than the first two, remaining in operation for more than twenty years, until it too was destroyed by fire, on November 21, 1922.

All three Eclipse Park locations had been destroyed by fire of various origins. The Louisville Courier-Journal covered each of these events in the days following. After the 1922 fire, the paper editorialized that wooden ballparks were obsolete and should be replaced by steel and concrete. The ball club followed that advice, opening Parkway Field the following spring.

== See also ==
- Sports in Louisville, Kentucky
