= Guy Hecker =

American baseball player and manager (1856–1938)

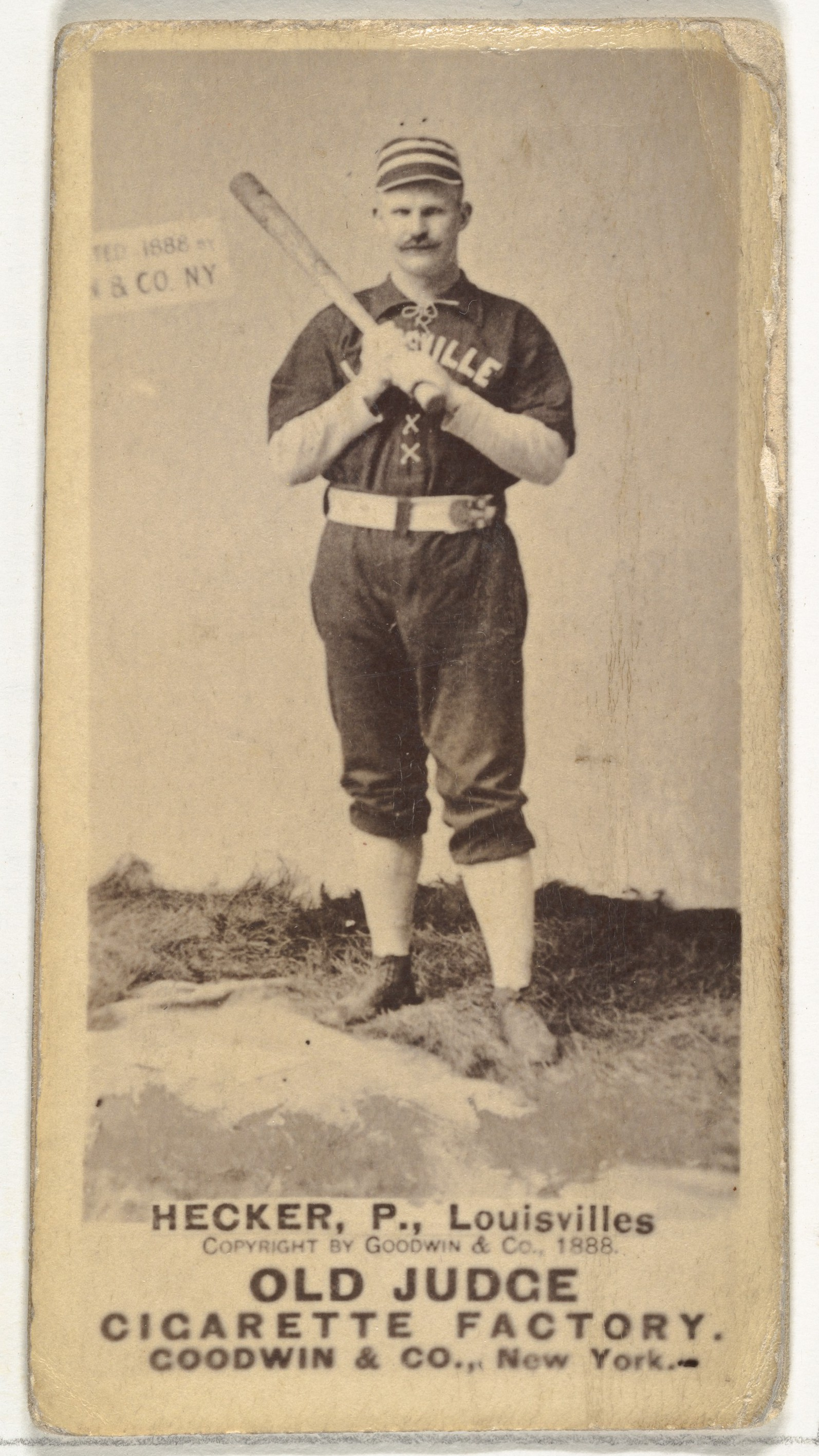
- 1888 baseball card of Hecker
- Pitcher / First baseman / Outfielder / Player-manager
- Born: April 3, 1856; Youngsville, Pennsylvania, U.S.
- Died: December 3, 1938 (aged 82); Wooster, Ohio, U.S.
- Batted: Right Threw: Right

MLB debut
- May 2, 1882, for the Louisville Eclipse

Last MLB appearance
- September 30, 1890, for the Pittsburgh Alleghenys

MLB statistics
- Win–loss record: 175–146
- Earned run average: 2.93
- Strikeouts: 1,110
- Batting average: .282
- Home runs: 19
- Runs batted in: 278
- Managerial record and winning percentage: 23–113–2 (.169)
- Stats at Baseball Reference

Teams
- As player: Louisville Eclipse/Colonels (1882–1889); Pittsburgh Alleghenys (1890); As manager: Pittsburgh Alleghenys (1890)

Career highlights and awards
- AA Triple Crown (1884); AA wins leader (1884); AA ERA leader (1884); AA strikeout leader (1884); AA batting champion (1886); Pitched a no-hitter on September 19, 1882

Guy Jackson Hecker (April 3, 1856 – December 3, 1938) was an American professional baseball pitcher, first baseman, outfielder, and player-manager. He played in Major League Baseball from 1882 to 1890, primarily for the Louisville Eclipse/Colonels. In 1884, he won the American Association (AA) pitching triple crown.

Hecker acted as player-manager during the 1890 Pittsburgh Alleghenys season; in his only season managing a team, Hecker had a managerial record of 23–113–2 (.169). As of 2025, this remains the worst single-season record in the history of the Pittsburgh Pirates franchise. The 1890 team also recorded the most losses and the second-fewest wins in a season (behind only the shortened 60-game 2020 season).

== Early life ==
Hecker was born in Youngsville, Pennsylvania, in 1856. His family moved to Oil City, Pennsylvania, when he was a child.

In 1877, Hecker started his professional baseball career with the Springfield Champion City of the League Alliance. He was listed at 6'0" tall and 190 pounds, and he batted and threw right-handed.

After that season, Hecker moved back to Oil City, got married, and played for local teams through 1881.

== Louisville ==
In 1882, Hecker joined the Louisville team of the new AA as a first baseman and backup pitcher to Tony Mullane. During his career, Hecker was known for his sharp baseball mind and leadership skills. He was friends and roommates with his teammate Pete Browning, an eccentric slugger.

On September 19, 1882, Hecker became the second AA pitcher to throw a no-hitter; his teammate Mullane had thrown one a week earlier. Hecker finished the season with a 6–6 win–loss record, a 1.30 earned run average (ERA), and 33 strikeouts.

In 1883, Mullane left the team, and Hecker became Louisville's primary pitcher. That season, Hecker went 28–23 with a 3.34 ERA and 164 strikeouts. Hecker was a power pitcher early in his major league career, with his key pitch being a "hard overhand drop curve." He was also a good hitter who sometimes played as a first baseman or outfielder when not pitching.

Hecker had the best season of his career in 1884, winning the pitching version of the triple crown. He went 52–20 and led the AA with 670.2 innings pitched, 72 complete games, 52 wins, a 1.80 ERA, 385 strikeouts, and a 171 ERA+. His 52 wins are tied for the fourth-most during a single season in major league history.

In 1885, Hecker went 30–23 with a 2.18 ERA and 209 strikeouts.

In 1886, Hecker suffered from an arm injury. He became a finesse pitcher and spent more time at first base for the rest of his career afterward. He also developed a rivalry with Louisville's new top pitcher, Toad Ramsey, which threatened to split the team. Despite all that, Hecker went 26–23 that season with a 2.87 ERA and 133 strikeouts. He had his best season as a hitter, leading the AA with a .341 batting average and posting a 161 OPS+.

During the second game of a doubleheader against Baltimore on August 15, 1886, Hecker went six-for-seven at the plate, hitting three home runs and scoring seven runs. He is the only major league player to ever score seven runs in a game, and he is the only pitcher with six hits in a nine-inning game.

A new rule change in 1887 limited pitcher movement on the mound to one forward step. This forced Hecker to abandon his usual "running start" delivery and hurt his performance. He finished the season with a record of 18–12, a 4.16 ERA, and 58 strikeouts.

In 1888, Hecker went 8–17 with a 3.39 ERA and 63 strikeouts.

In 1889, Hecker went 5–13 with a 5.59 ERA and 33 strikeouts. Louisville released him on September 17 of that year.

== Pittsburgh ==
In 1890, Hecker joined the Pittsburgh Alleghenys of the National League as a player-manager. As a pitcher, Hecker went 2–9 with a 5.11 ERA and 32 strikeouts. Pittsburgh had a record of 23–113 and finished in last place.

During Hecker's major league career, he appeared in 336 games as a pitcher, 322 as a first baseman, and 75 as an outfielder. As a pitcher, he went 175–146 with a 2.93 ERA, 1110 strikeouts, and a 113 ERA+. As a hitter, he had a .282 batting average, 19 home runs, 278 runs batted in, and a 117 OPS+. In the 2001 book The New Bill James Historical Baseball Abstract, Bill James ranked Hecker as the seventh-best pitcher/hitter combination in baseball history.

== Later life ==
In 1891, Hecker was a player-manager for Fort Wayne of the Northwestern League.

In 1892, Hecker was a player-manager for the Jacksonville Lunatics of the Illinois-Iowa League.

During the next few years, Hecker settled in Oil City, managed local teams, and was involved in the oil business. Later in life, he and his wife ran a grocery store in Wooster, Ohio.

Hecker died in Wooster in 1938, at age 82, and was buried at Wooster Cemetery.

== See also ==
- List of Major League Baseball career complete games leaders
- List of Major League Baseball annual wins leaders
- List of Major League Baseball annual strikeout leaders
- List of Major League Baseball batting champions

Achievements
Preceded by Tony Mullane	No-hitter pitcher September 19, 1882	Succeeded by Larry Corcoran
