= Mordecai Davidson =

American baseball owner and manager

- Owner / Manager
- Born: November 30, 1845; Port Washington, Ohio, U.S.
- Died: September 6, 1940 (aged 94); Louisville, Kentucky, U.S.

MLB statistics
- Managerial record: 35–54
- Winning %: .393
- Managerial record at Baseball Reference

Teams
- As manager: Louisville Colonels (1888)

Mordecai Hamilton Davidson (November 30, 1845 – September 6, 1940) was an American professional baseball owner and manager. A Civil War veteran, he is best known as the primary owner of the Louisville Colonels of the American Association in the late 1880s, during the worst period of the team's history. He was one of three managers of the 1888 Colonels, during his ownership of the team.

== Biography ==
Davidson was working for a local mercantile house in Louisville, Kentucky, when he became a shareholder of the Louisville Colonels in 1887. The Colonels were members of the American Association (AA), a major league.

Prior to the 1888 season, Davidson was named the Colonels' secretary-treasurer, and on June 6 he bought out most of the team's other shareholders. Two days later, Davidson relieved manager Kick Kelly, with the team having won only 10 of 39 games played. Davidson then managed the team himself for three games, winning one. After John Kerins managed the team for seven games, winning three, Davidson took over as manager once again and managed the team for the rest of the season. During his second tenure as manager, Davidson managed 90 games, winning 34 and losing 52 with 4 ties. Overall, Davidson's record as manager was 35 wins, 54 losses and 4 ties. It was his only experience as a major league manager. The Colonels finished the season with a record of 48–87, next-to-last in the eight-team AA.

Prior to the 1889 season, Davidson brought in Dude Esterbrook as manager, while also seeking to sell the team. Esterbrook only lasted 10 games, winning two, and the club went through four managers during the season. By June, the players were in open revolt over Davidson's handling of the club, and several of them refused to play outright on June 14. A special meeting of the AA board was called, and Davidson was issued an ultimatum to strengthen the club or be forced out. In early July, Davidson surrendered control of the Colonels to the AA. The team finished the season in last place, with a record of 27–111, and had a 26-game losing streak.

Davidson served three years in the Union Army during the Civil War, in Company A, 17th Indiana Regiment. He was an active member of the Grand Army of the Republic (G.A.R.) through at least December 1939. Davidson died in Louisville in September 1940; he was survived by a son.

== Bibliography ==
- Sullivan, Dean A. (1997). Early Innings: A Documentary History of Baseball, 1825-1908. University of Nebraska Press. pp. 178–179. ISBN 978-0-8032-9244-4. "Player Strike by Louisville Players (1889)"
- Tarvin, A. H. (November 7, 1943). "Didn't Know Base Hit From Bass Viol But Davidson Saved Baseball Here". The Courier-Journal. Louisville, Kentucky. p. 54 – via newspapers.com.
- Terrell, William Henry Harrison, Adjutant General (1866). Roster of Enlisted Men [incl.] Indiana Regiments Sixth to Twenty-Ninth 1861-1865 (PDF). Report of the Adjutant General of the State of Indiana. Vol. IV. Indianapolis, IN: Samuel R. Douglas, State Printer. pp. 344–371. OCLC 558004259.
