= Dan Shannon =

American baseball player and manager (1865–1913)

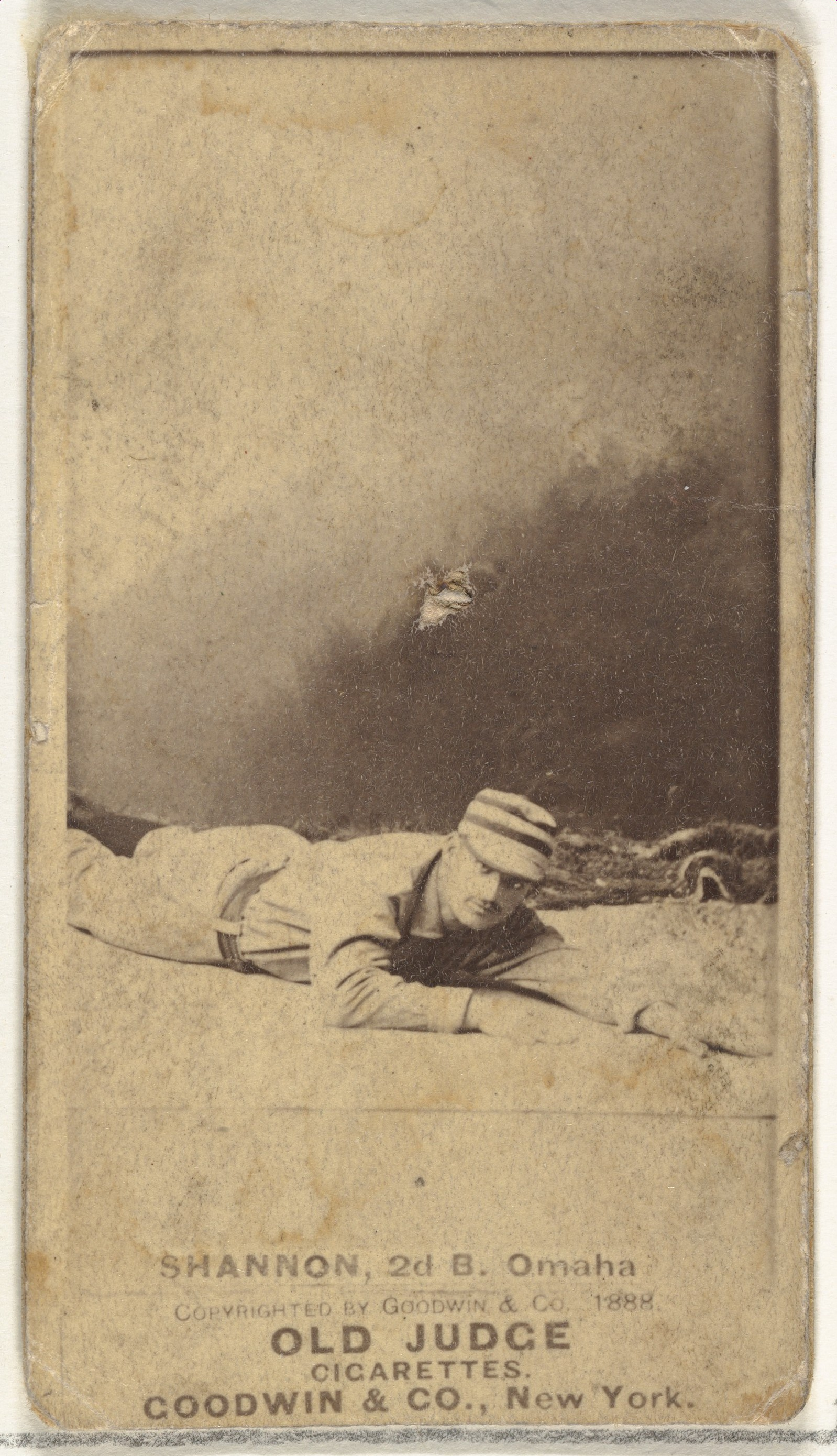
- Second baseman / Manager
- Born: March 23, 1865; Bridgeport, Connecticut, U.S.
- Died: October 24, 1913 (aged 48); Bridgeport, Connecticut, U.S.
- Batted: Unknown Threw: Unknown

MLB debut
- April 17, 1889, for the Louisville Colonels

Last MLB appearance
- September 16, 1891, for the Washington Statesmen

MLB statistics
- Batting average: .233
- Home runs: 8
- Runs: 111
- Stats at Baseball Reference

Teams
- As player: Louisville Colonels (1889); Philadelphia Athletics (1890); New York Giants (1890); Washington Statesmen (1891); As manager: Louisville Colonels (1889); Washington Statesmen (1891)

Daniel Webster Shannon (March 23, 1865 – October 24, 1913) was an American Major League Baseball player and manager. He began his Major League career in 1889 with the Louisville Colonels as their second baseman. During the season, he became player-manager for a total of 56 games, of which only 10 were victories. In 1890, he jumped to the Players' League and played for the Philadelphia Athletics and the New York Giants that season. When the league folded the following year, he moved over the Washington Statesmen, and again was named player-manager during the season, this time for a period of 49 games winning only 15.

Dan moved on to minor leagues after his Major League career was over, and was the manager for the Buffalo Bisons of International League in 1899 when he was fired by owner for his "drunkenness". He died aged 48 in his hometown of Bridgeport, Connecticut, and was buried in the St. Michael's Cemetery in Stratford, Connecticut.

== See also ==
- List of Major League Baseball player-managers
