= John Kerins =

American baseball player (1858–1919)

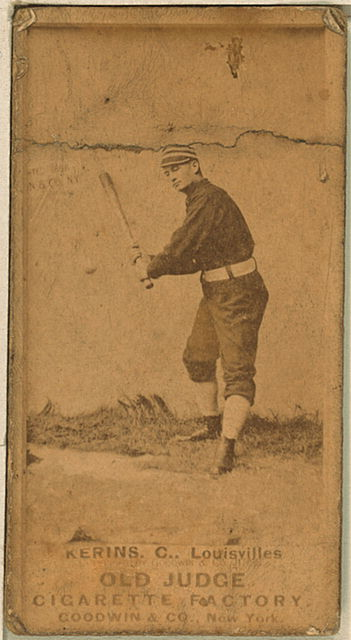
- First baseman
- Born: July 15, 1858; Indianapolis, Indiana, U.S.
- Died: September 8, 1919 (aged 61); Louisville, Kentucky, U.S.
- Batted: Right Threw: Right

MLB debut
- May 1, 1884, for the Indianapolis Hoosiers

Last MLB appearance
- June 15, 1890, for the St. Louis Browns

MLB statistics
- Batting average: .252
- Home runs: 20
- Runs batted in: 217

Teams
- As player: Indianapolis Hoosiers (1884); Louisville Colonels (1885–1889); Baltimore Orioles (1889); St. Louis Browns (1890); As manager: Louisville Colonels (1888); St. Louis Browns (1890)

John Nelson Kerins (July 15, 1858 – September 8, 1919) was an American Major League Baseball player who appeared mainly at first base but also at catcher and in the outfield. He played for the Indianapolis Hoosiers (1884), Louisville Colonels (1885-1889), Baltimore Orioles (1889) and St. Louis Browns (1890). He was a player-manager for Louisville in 1888 and for St. Louis in 1890, and he umpired American Association games through 1891.

== Biography ==
Born in Indianapolis, Indiana, Kerins began his major league career with the 1884 Indianapolis Hoosiers of the American Association. After the season, the Hoosiers folded, and John moved on to the Louisville Colonels, where he spent the next few seasons.

Though Kerins played twice as many career major league games at first base as he did at catcher, he was often known more for his play at the latter position. In Louisville, he was the personal catcher for left-handed knuckleball pitcher Toad Ramsey. He led the league's catchers in 1886 with 157 assists despite catching only 65 games. Many of those assists came on one of Ramsey's 499 strikeouts that season when Kerins would mishandle a Ramsey knuckleball, which necessitated a throw to first base to complete the strikeout. Offensively, the 1887 season may have been his best; he hit .294 with a league-leading 19 triples and 49 stolen bases.

Kerins finished the 1889 season with the Baltimore Orioles. Before the 1890 season, Kerins was working as a bartender in Indianapolis. He returned to the Orioles for the 1890 season but did not play in any regular season games before he was released in May of that year; he played for the St. Louis Browns for the rest of the season, concluding his playing career. In addition to playing, twice he was named interim manager, once with the Colonels in 1888 and also in his one season with the Browns. He also umpired a total of 246 major league games, mostly in the American Association from 1889 to 1891. His appointment as an AA umpire was made official in April 1891, after Kerins had retired as a player.

By 1895, Kerins was working as a bartender at a Louisville bar partly owned by major league outfielder Tom Brown. In 1907, when another man of the same name was hired as an AA umpire, Kerins was still working as a bartender. Late in life, Kerins worked as a houseman at the Tyler Hotel in Louisville, Kentucky. He suffered from rheumatism and died after two weeks in a Louisville hospital in 1919. He was buried in a potter's field, but he was later reinterred at Cave Hill Cemetery in Louisville.

== See also ==
- List of Major League Baseball annual triples leaders
- List of Major League Baseball player-managers
