= Toad Ramsey =

American baseball player (1864–1906)

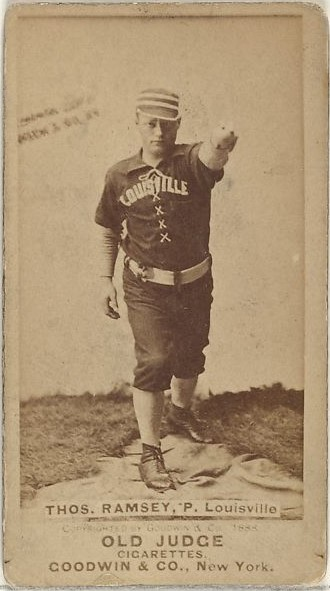
- 1888 baseball card of Ramsey
- Pitcher
- Born: August 8, 1864; Indianapolis, Indiana, U.S.
- Died: March 27, 1906 (aged 41); Indianapolis, Indiana, U.S.
- Batted: Right Threw: Left

MLB debut
- September 5, 1885, for the Louisville Colonels

Last MLB appearance
- September 17, 1890, for the St. Louis Browns

MLB statistics
- Win–loss record: 113–124
- Earned run average: 3.29
- Strikeouts: 1,515
- Stats at Baseball Reference

Teams
- Louisville Colonels (1885–1889); St. Louis Browns (1889–1890)

Career highlights and awards
- AA strikeouts leader (1887)

Thomas H. "Toad" Ramsey (August 8, 1864 – March 27, 1906) was an American Major League Baseball player who pitched in the majors from 1885 to 1890. Ramsey spent his entire career in the American Association, split between playing for the Louisville Colonels and St. Louis Browns. He is sometimes credited with inventing a pitch, the knuckleball, and was one of the top pitchers in the Association for more than two years, with statistics that put him in the top five in multiple pitching categories.

== Career ==
=== Louisville ===
Born in Indianapolis, Indiana, and a former bricklayer, Ramsey is credited as the inventor of the knuckleball pitch. He had severed the tendon in the index finger of his pitching hand with a trowel. The result was that Ramsey's pitches had a natural knuckleball motion. He threw with a fastball motion, holding the ball with his index finger retracted, since he could not straighten it, and with just his finger tip on the ball. Some historians have disputed he actually threw a knuckleball in the modern sense, in that his ball movement was like what is now known as a knuckle curve.

While playing for the Chattanooga Lookouts of the Southern League, Ramsey pitched a no-hitter on May 30, 1885, against the Nashville Americans in a road game where only three players reached base, two via walks and one on an error. On August 29, Chattanooga traded him to Louisville Colonels of the American Association in exchange for John Connor and $750. He was brought in to spell star pitcher Guy Hecker, who had a sore arm, and made his major league debut on September 5, in a complete game 4–3 loss to the St. Louis Browns. In that first season with the Colonels, he started nine games, completing them all with a 3–6 win–loss record.

For the 1886 season, his first full season in the majors, Ramsey became the number one starting pitcher for the Colonels, sharing starts with Hecker. Ramsey logged in a league leading 588 2/3 innings and 66 complete games in 67 starts. In addition to his league leading statistics that season, his earned run average of 2.45 and 38 wins were good for third in the league. His 499 strikeouts that season finished second behind Matt Kilroy's record setting total of 513. Ramsey's total is the second-highest total in major league history. Ramsey and Hecker's relationship steadily became more at odds the more Ramsey's status with the team grew. At one point, Ramsey stated Hecker was jealous of his success and it would be good for the team if Hecker were released.

Ramsey had a similar 1887 season winning 37 games. His 355 strikeouts led the American Association, while his 561 innings pitched, 64 games started, and 61 complete games, were all second in the league to Kilroy. Unfortunately, his dominant years stopped after that season, and his fortunes changed for the worse beginning during the 1888 season. His win–loss record was 8–30 in 40 starts. On July 25, 1888, Ramsey was arrested for not paying an overdue bar bill.

=== St. Louis ===
His 1889 season began the way his 1888 season went, winning one game in his 18 starts with Louisville. On July 17, he was traded to the St. Louis Browns for Nat Hudson. He pitched in just five games the rest of season, but did go 3–1 and had an ERA of 3.95. He returned with St. Louis for the 1890 season, and pitched his last season in the majors. He had a record of 24–17, struck out 257 batters, and had an ERA of 3.69 in 348 2/3 innings pitched. Ramsey was released by St. Louis on September 19, 1890, and he never returned to the majors.

== Death ==
Ramsey died of pneumonia in his hometown of Indianapolis at the age of 41, and is interred at Crown Hill Cemetery and Aboretum, Section 37, Lot 238.

== See also ==
- List of Major League Baseball annual strikeout leaders
- List of St. Louis Cardinals team records
