= Louisville Colonels =

Former American Major League Baseball team

Information
- Ballpark: Eclipse Park II (1892–1899); Eclipse Park I (1882–1893)
- Former name: Louisville Colonels (1885–1899); Louisville Eclipse (1882–1884)
- Former league: National League (1892–1899); American Association (1882–1891)
- Colors: Red Yellow
- Ownership: Barney Dreyfuss (1894–1899); Mordecai Davidson & John R. Botto (1889); W. L. Lyons, Zach Phelps, W. L. Jackson, John Phelps, Mordecai Davidson & John R. Botto (1888); W. L. Lyons, Zach Phelps, W. L. Jackson, John Phelps & Mordecai Davidson (1887); W. L. Lyons, Zach Phelps, W. L. Jackson & John Phelps (1882–1886)
- President: Harry Pulliam (1897–1899)
- Manager: Fred Clarke (1897–1899); Jim Rogers (1897); Bill McGunnigle (1896); John McCloskey (1895–1896); Billy Barnie (1893–1894); Jack Chapman & Fred Pfeffer (1892); Jack Chapman (1890–1891); Dude Esterbrook, Jimmy Wolf, Dan Shannon & Jack Chapman (1889); Mordecai Davidson & John Kerins (1888); Kick Kelly (1887–1888); Jim Hart (1885–1886); Joe Gerhardt & Mike Walsh (1884); Joe Gerhardt (1883); Denny Mack (1882)

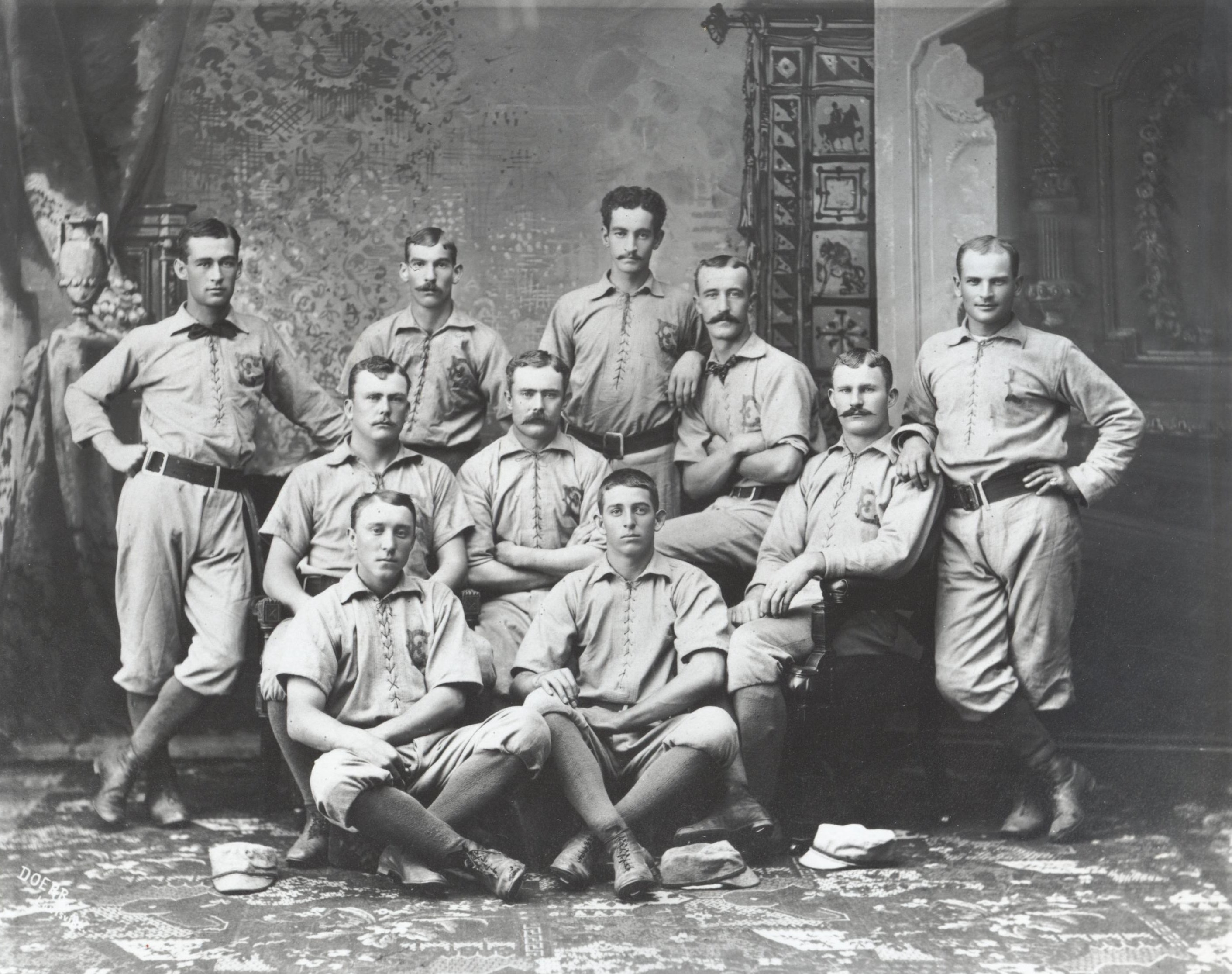
1882 Louisville Eclipse

The Louisville Colonels were a Major League Baseball team that played in the American Association (AA) throughout that league's ten-year existence from 1882 until 1891. They were known as the Louisville Eclipse from 1882 to 1884, and as the Louisville Colonels from 1885 to 1891; the latter name derived from the historic title of the Kentucky Colonel. After the AA folded in 1891, the Colonels joined the National League and played through the 1899 season.

"Colonels" was also the name of several minor league baseball teams that played in Louisville, Kentucky, in the 20th century.

== American Association ==
After spending several years as a well-known semi-pro team, the Eclipse joined the newly founded American Association in 1882. The Eclipse's backer, local distiller J. H. Pank, was named vice-president of the AA, and the team was to be run by a consortium led by broker and future Louisville mayor pro tem William L. Lyons. Their star player, Pete Browning, was a Louisville native who won the American Association's batting title in the league's first season; he hit .378 that year. Two years later, in 1884, the Colonels came up with another star player; pitcher Guy Hecker won what is known as the "Pitcher's Triple Crown." He led the league in wins, earned run average and strikeouts.

Managing partner Lyons resigned in mid-1888, and was succeeded by team secretary Mordecai Davidson. The team did not play well, and Davidson was having financial problems, so in order to stay afloat financially, he sold three of the team's best players to other teams. As a result of this, the talent-poor Colonels could no longer compete effectively. The 1889 Louisville Colonels season was disastrous. At one point the Colonels lost 26 consecutive games, which is still a major league record. They finished in last place with a 27–111 record, becoming the first major league team to lose 100+ games in a season. Davidson feuded constantly with his players, who responded in June 1889 by staging major league baseball's first-ever player strike. The following month, Davidson surrendered control of the team to the AA. The team was then purchased by a consortium of ten Louisville businessmen, headed by railroad executive Lawrence Parsons. In September, Parsons hired a new manager, Jack Chapman.

The 1890 Louisville Colonels season was historic. The club won the American Association pennant; this was the first time in major league history that a team won a league championship after having finished in last place the previous season. The club's remarkable achievement in moving from "worst to first" is celebrated in a 2026 book, The 1890 Louisville Cyclones, written by Perry T. Cooper and published by McFarland & Company, Publishers. Unfortunately, the Colonels returned to their losing ways the following season.

== National League ==
In 1892 the American Association dissolved. The Colonels moved to the National League and played there until 1899. In 1900, team owner Barney Dreyfuss acquired controlling interest of the Pittsburgh Pirates and brought 14 Colonels players with him, including future Hall of Famers Honus Wagner and Fred Clarke, marking the end of the original Colonels organization and Louisville as a Major League Baseball host city. Honus Wagner recorded his first Major League hit while playing with Louisville.

== Notable achievements ==
In September 1882, Louisville pitchers threw two no-hitters in the span of nine days; Tony Mullane on September 11, followed by Guy Hecker on September 19. Other Louisville pitchers who threw no-hitters were Ben Sanders on August 22, 1892, and Deacon Phillippe, a rookie, on May 25, 1899. Pete Browning hit for the cycle twice for Louisville, on August 8, 1886, and June 7, 1889.

=== Notable Colonels players ===
- Pete Browning (outfielder)
- Fred Clarke (outfielder–manager)
- Harry Davis (first baseman–manager)
- Jerry Denny (third baseman)
- Jack Glasscock (shortstop)
- Dummy Hoy (center fielder)
- Hughie Jennings (shortstop)
- Tony Mullane (pitcher)
- Deacon Phillippe (pitcher)
- Toad Ramsey (pitcher)
- Rube Waddell (pitcher)
- Honus Wagner (shortstop)
- Nick Altrock (pitcher)
- Jimmy Collins (third baseman)

=== Baseball Hall of Famers ===
Louisville Colonels Hall of Famers
Inductee	Position	Tenure	Inducted
Fred Clarke	OF/Manager	1894–1899	1945
Hughie Jennings	SS/1B	1891–1893	1945
Rube Waddell	P	1897, 1899	1946
Honus Wagner	SS	1897–1899	1936
Jimmy Collins	3B	1895	1946

== See also ==
- Sports in Louisville, Kentucky
