= 1897 in baseball =

The following are the baseball events of the year 1897 throughout the world.

== Champions ==
- Temple Cup: Baltimore Orioles over Boston Beaneaters (4–1)
- National League: Boston Beaneaters

== Statistical leaders ==
National League
Stat	Player	Total
AVG	Willie Keeler (BAL)	.424
HR	Hugh Duffy (BSN)	11
RBI	George Davis (NYG)	135
W	Kid Nichols (BSN)	31
ERA	Amos Rusie (NYG)	2.54
K	Doc McJames (WAS); Cy Seymour (NYG)	156

== National League final standings ==
National League
Team	W	L	Pct.	GB	Home	Road
Boston Beaneaters	93	39	.705	—	54‍–‍12	39‍–‍27
Baltimore Orioles	90	40	.692	2	51‍–‍15	39‍–‍25
New York Giants	83	48	.634	9½	51‍–‍19	32‍–‍29
Cincinnati Reds	76	56	.576	17	49‍–‍18	27‍–‍38
Cleveland Spiders	69	62	.527	23½	49‍–‍16	20‍–‍46
Washington Senators	61	71	.462	32	40‍–‍26	21‍–‍45
Brooklyn Bridegrooms	61	71	.462	32	38‍–‍29	23‍–‍42
Pittsburgh Pirates	60	71	.458	32½	38‍–‍27	22‍–‍44
Chicago Colts	59	73	.447	34	36‍–‍30	23‍–‍43
Philadelphia Phillies	55	77	.417	38	32‍–‍34	23‍–‍43
Louisville Colonels	52	78	.400	40	34‍–‍31	18‍–‍47
St. Louis Browns	29	102	.221	63½	18‍–‍41	11‍–‍61

Locations of teams for the 1896–1897 National League seasons
National League

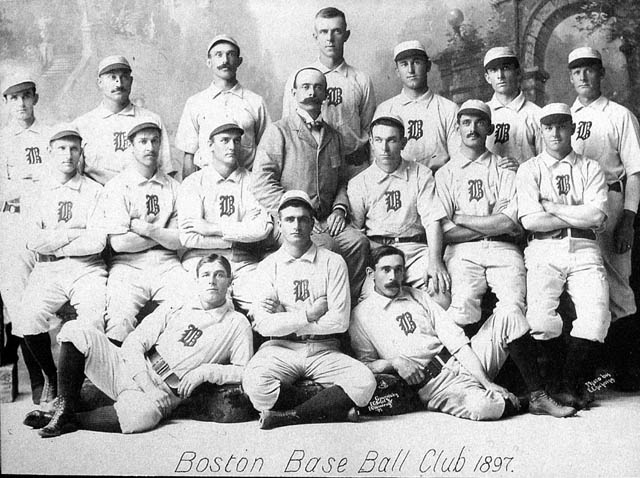
1897 Boston Beaneaters

== Notable seasons ==
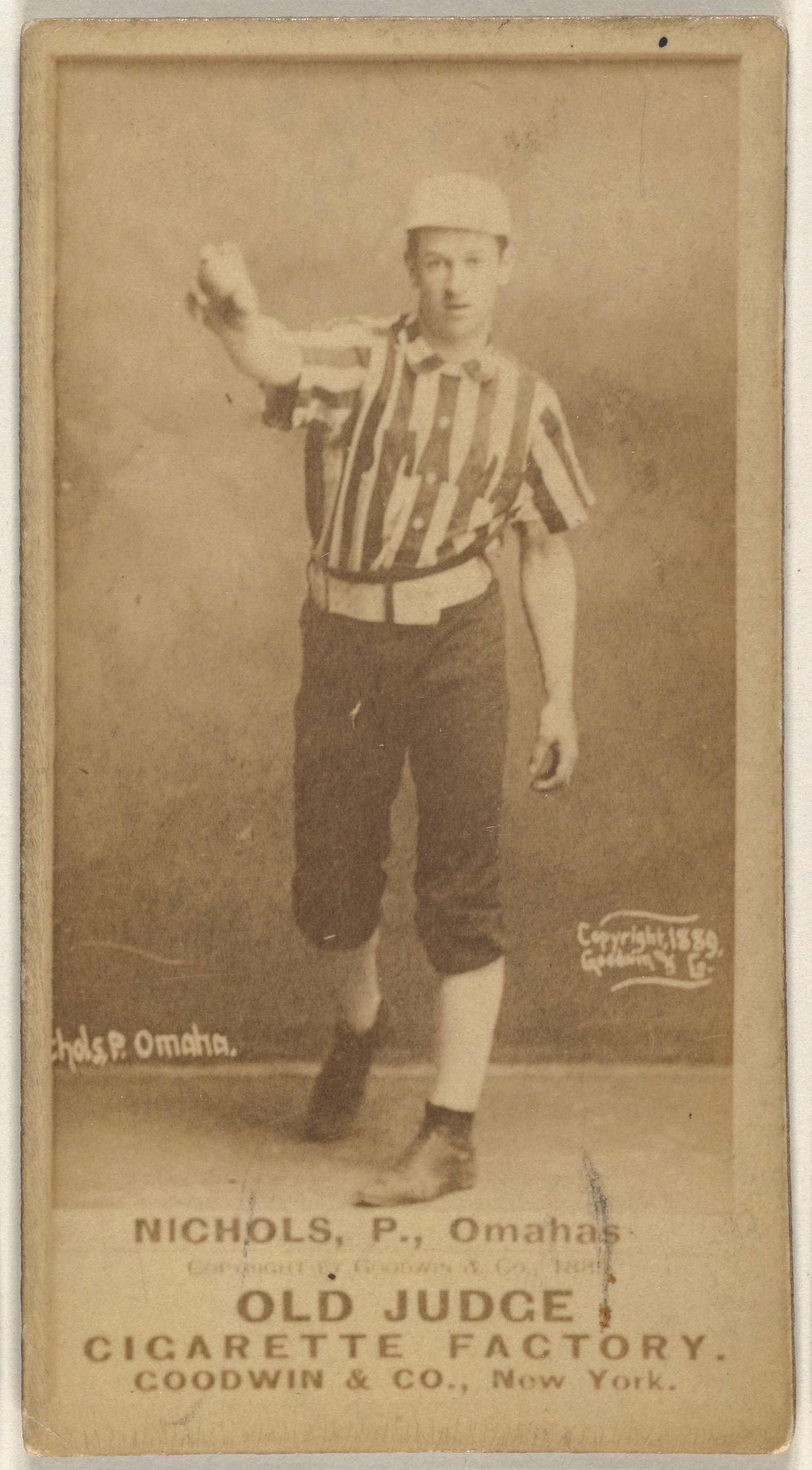
Kid Nichols

- Baltimore Orioles right fielder Willie Keeler led the NL in batting average (.424) and hits (239). He was second in the NL in total bases (304), slugging percentage (.539), adjusted OPS+ (164), and runs scored (145). He was third in the NL in on-base percentage (.464).
- Boston Beaneaters pitcher Kid Nichols had a win–loss record of 31–11 and led the NL in innings pitched (368), wins (31), and adjusted ERA+ (168). He was second in the NL in earned run average (2.64). He was fifth in the NL in strikeouts (127).

== Events ==
- February 28 – The St. Louis Browns acquired Duke Esper off waivers from the Baltimore Orioles.
- May 22 – The New York Giants released Jake Beckley.
- June 1 – The Philadelphia Phillies traded Kid Carsey and Mike Grady to the St. Louis Browns for Ed McFarland.
- June 3 – The Washington Senators purchased the contract of Tommy Tucker from Boston.
- June 11 – Chippy McGarr is released by the Cleveland Spiders.
- June 24 – Dick Harley of the St. Louis Browns collects six hits in one game against the Pittsburgh Pirates.
- June 29 – The Chicago Colts defeat the Louisville Colonels 36–7, which remains the record for the most runs by one team in a game as of 2025.
- July 18 – Cap Anson of the Chicago Colts collects his 3,000th career hit with a single off of Baltimore Orioles pitcher George Blackburn.
- September 18 – Cy Young pitches the first no-hitter of his career as the Cleveland Spiders defeat the Cincinnati Reds, 6–0, in the first game of a doubleheader.

== Births ==
=== January ===
- January 1 – Monty Swartz
- January 3 – Pete Turgeon
- January 5 – Art Delaney
- January 6
  - Buck Crouse
  - By Speece
- January 7 – Topper Rigney
- January 9 – Dave Keefe
- January 15 – Joe Genewich
- January 24 – George Ellison
- January 29 – Pat Patterson

=== February ===
- February 9 – Adrian Lynch
- February 11
  - Red Miller
  - Joe Shannon
  - Red Shannon
- February 14 – Earl Smith
- February 15
  - Art Johnson
  - Chuck Wolfe
- February 16
  - Paul Castner
  - Alex Ferguson
- February 17 – Ike Boone
- February 18 – Huck Betts
- February 25 – Bob Vines

=== March ===
- March 1 – Howie Jones
- March 4
  - Neal Brady
  - Lefty O'Doul
- March 5
  - Virgil Barnes
  - Lu Blue
- March 6 – Cliff Brady
- March 9 – Joe Dawson
- March 10 – Russ Ennis
- March 13 – Lew Malone
- March 14 – Bruce Hitt
- March 19 – Elmer Bowman
- March 21
  - Gus Ketchum
  - Bill Lamar
- March 27
  - Joe Lucey
  - Effa Manley
- March 30 – Ed Sicking

=== April ===
- April 4 – Ray Miner
- April 8 – Dick Attreau
- April 10
  - Joe Price
  - Ross Youngs
- April 15 – Walt Lynch
- April 20 – Lou Vedder
- April 26 – Epp Sell
- April 30 – Walt Walsh

=== May ===
- May 3 – Ray Shepardson
- May 12 – Joe Dugan
- May 13 – Hugh Canavan
- May 17 – Harry Riconda
- May 20 – Wilcy Moore
- May 30 – Wally Kimmick

=== June ===
- June 6 – Ray Pierce
- June 12 – Guy Lacy
- June 13 – George Foss
- June 15 – Cy Twombly
- June 17 – Bill Hubbell
- June 22 – Bill Mizeur
- June 25 – Camp Skinner
- June 29 – Grady Adkins

=== July ===
- July 3
  - Chet Nichols Sr.
  - Heinie Sand
- July 5 – Tom Miller
- July 9 – Glenn Myatt
- July 12 – Hod Fenner
- July 16 – Hi Bell
- July 18
  - Hank Hulvey
  - Pat Murray
  - Ed Sherling
- July 22 – Ed Gerner
- July 23
  - Hod Ford
  - Cy Fried
- July 26 – Chick Bowen
- July 27 – Biz Mackey
- July 29 – Jim Hamby

=== August ===
- August 8
  - Charlie Eckert
  - Ken Holloway
- August 10 – Frank Welch
- August 16 – Bob Fothergill
- August 17
  - Joe Bradshaw
  - Ed Lennon
- August 18 – Mandy Brooks
- August 22 – Bob Clark
- August 24
  - Al Bool
  - Frank Pratt
- August 29 – John Quinn
- August 31 – William Bell

=== September ===
- September 13 – Eddie Rommel
- September 17
  - Joe Green
  - Earl Webb
- September 19 – Astyanax Douglass
- September 23 – Walt Irwin
- September 25 – Walter Anderson
- September 27 – Chick Gagnon
- September 30
  - Eddie Kenna
  - Mike Kircher

=== October ===
- October 7 – Bill Jackman
- October 9 – Harry Biemiller
- October 13 – Elliot Bigelow
- October 14 – Vance McIlree
- October 15
  - Dinty Gearin
  - Sam Gray
- October 16 – Garland Buckeye
- October 18 – Sumpter Clarke
- October 19 – Tom Lovelace
- October 20
  - Tom Connelly
  - Jigger Statz
- October 22 – Myles Thomas
- October 26
  - Skipper Friday
  - George Winn
- October 29 – Ty Pickup
- October 30 – Kettle Wirts
- October 31 – Tony Rego

=== November ===
- November 4
  - Ted Menze
  - Dolly Stark
- November 5 – Jack Ogden
- November 9
  - Johnny Gooch
  - Harvey Hendrick
- November 17
  - Davey Claire
  - Rube Lutzke
- November 20 – Larry Benton
- November 21 – Andy High
- November 23
  - Bubber Jonnard
  - Claude Jonnard
  - Freddy Leach
  - Beans Reardon
- November 26 – Bill Warwick
- November 30
  - Win Ballou
  - Dud Branom

=== December ===
- December 10
  - Jocko Conlon
  - Tim Griesenbeck
- December 11 – Slim Harriss
- December 14 – Syl Simon
- December 16 – Fred Wigington
- December 18 – Lance Richbourg
- December 19 – Mike Herrera
- December 20 – Snooks Dowd
- December 21
  - Hal Haid
  - Pete Scott
- December 22 – Harvey Freeman
- December 23 – Nemo Gaines
- December 25 – Allen Elliott
- December 27 – Jackie Tavener

== Deaths ==
- February 5 – Old Hoss Radbourn, 42, Hall of Fame pitcher who won over 300 games including a record 60 for the 1884 Providence Grays, leading the National League in wins, strikeouts, winning percentage and games twice each and in shutouts, innings and ERA once each; completing 489 out of 503 starts, pitching three shutouts in the 1884 World Championship Series, while holding single-season records for games pitched with 76 in 1883, going 27–12 for the 1890 Players' League champions.
- February 8 – Fleury Sullivan, 35, pitcher.
- March 5 – Dave Foutz, 40, first baseman/outfielder/pitcher who played from 1884 through 1896 for the St. Louis Browns and the Brooklyn Bridegrooms/Grooms, a three-time .300 hitter and manager for the Brooklyn teams between 1893 and 1896 for a .690 career winning percentage, while pitching 41 wins for the 1886 champion Browns.
- March 10 – Wes Blogg, 42, catcher.
- March 21 – Andy Allison, 49, first baseman.
- March 22 – Dave Anderson, 28, pitcher.
- March 25 – Bill Quarles, 28, pitcher.
- April 13 – Charlie Yingling, 31, shortstop.
- July 10 – Kid Baldwin, 32, catcher.
- August 1 – Jake Seymour, 43, who played for the Pittsburgh Alleghenys of the American Association in the 1882 season.
- August 4 – John Gilroy, 27, pitcher.
- August 9 – Jack Scheible, 31, pitcher.
- August 19 – Jim McKeever, 36, catcher.
- August 22 – Tricky Nichols, 47, pitcher who posted a 28–73 record and a 3.06 ERA in 106 games for six different teams between 1875 and 1882.
- August 27 – Sam Moran, 26, pitcher.
- October 9 – Milo Lockwood, 39, outfielder and pitcher.
- October 19 – O. P. Caylor, 47, one of the founders of the American Association.
- November 2 – Joe Sullivan, 27, shortstop.
- November 15 – Charlie Smith, 56, infielder who appeared in 14 games for the 1871 New York Mutuals.
- November 19 – Frank McGinn, 28, infielder.
- December 20 – William Brown, 31, catcher.
