= 1897 Philadelphia Phillies season =

National League season

1897 Philadelphia Phillies
- League: National League
- Ballpark: National League Park
- City: Philadelphia, Pennsylvania
- Record: 55–77 (.417)
- League place: 10th
- Owners: Al Reach, John Rogers
- Managers: George Stallings

The 1897 Philadelphia Phillies season was a season in Major League Baseball in which the Philadelphia Phillies competed in the National League. The team finished in 10th place with a record of 55–77, playing their home games at National League Park in Philadelphia, Pennsylvania. The team was owned by Al Reach and John Rogers and managed by George Stallings.

== Preseason ==
The Phillies held spring training in 1897 in Augusta, Georgia where the team roomed and boarded at the Arlington Hotel. It was the lone season the Phillies trained in Augusta.

== Regular season ==
=== Season standings ===
National League
Team	W	L	Pct.	GB	Home	Road
Boston Beaneaters	93	39	.705	—	54‍–‍12	39‍–‍27
Baltimore Orioles	90	40	.692	2	51‍–‍15	39‍–‍25
New York Giants	83	48	.634	9½	51‍–‍19	32‍–‍29
Cincinnati Reds	76	56	.576	17	49‍–‍18	27‍–‍38
Cleveland Spiders	69	62	.527	23½	49‍–‍16	20‍–‍46
Washington Senators	61	71	.462	32	40‍–‍26	21‍–‍45
Brooklyn Bridegrooms	61	71	.462	32	38‍–‍29	23‍–‍42
Pittsburgh Pirates	60	71	.458	32½	38‍–‍27	22‍–‍44
Chicago Colts	59	73	.447	34	36‍–‍30	23‍–‍43
Philadelphia Phillies	55	77	.417	38	32‍–‍34	23‍–‍43
Louisville Colonels	52	78	.400	40	34‍–‍31	18‍–‍47
St. Louis Browns	29	102	.221	63½	18‍–‍41	11‍–‍61

=== Record vs. opponents ===
1897 National League record Sources:
Team	BAL	BSN	BRO	CHI	CIN	CLE	LOU	NYG	PHI	PIT	STL	WAS
Baltimore	—	6–6	9–3–2	9–3–3	6–6	7–4	10–1	5–7	10–2–1	9–3	10–2	9–3
Boston	6–6	—	9–3	8–4–1	9–3	7–5	9–3	8–4	10–2–1	10–2	10–2	7–5–1
Brooklyn	3–9–2	3–9	—	6–6	7–5	7–5	5–7	3–9–2	6–6	7–5	7–5	7–5
Chicago	3–9–3	4–8–1	6–6	—	5–7	4–8	6–6–1	5–7–1	5–7	6–6	8–4	7–5
Cincinnati	6–6	3–9	5–7	7–5	—	7–5	9–3	7–5–1	8–4	5–7–1	11–1	8–4
Cleveland	4–7	5–7	5–7	8–4	5–7	—	5–7	3–9	9–3	6–6	11–1–1	8–4
Louisville	1–10	3–9	7–5	6–6–1	3–9	7–5	—	6–6–1	3–9	4–8–2	8–3–1	4–8–1
New York	7–5	4–8	9–3–2	7–5–1	5–7–1	9–3	6–6–1	—	7–5	8–3–1	12–0	9–3–1
Philadelphia	2–10–1	2–10–1	6–6	7–5	4–8	3–9	9–3	5–7	—	5–7	8–4	4–8
Pittsburgh	3–9	2–10	5–7	6–6	7–5–1	6–6	8–4–2	3–8–1	7–5	—	8–4	5–7
St. Louis	2–10	2–10	5–7	4–8	1–11	1–11–1	3–8–1	0–12	4–8	4–8	—	3–9
Washington	3–9	5–7–1	5–7	5–7	4–8	4–8	8–4–1	3–9–1	8–4	7–5	9–3	—

=== Roster ===
1897 Philadelphia Phillies
Roster
Pitchers: Bob Becker; Kid Carsey; Davey Dunkle; Jack Fifield; Youngy Johnson; Tom Lipp; Al Orth; Tully Sparks; Jack Taylor; George Wheeler	Catchers: Jack Boyle; Jack Clements; Mike Grady; Ed McFarland; Infielders: Ed Abbaticchio; Lave Cross; Sam Gillen; Bill Hallman; Nap Lajoie; Kohly Miller; Billy Nash; Frank Shugart	Outfielders: Duff Cooley; Ed Delahanty; Tommy Dowd; Phil Geier; George Stallings; Sam Thompson	Manager: George Stallings

== Player stats ==
=== Batting ===
==== Starters by position ====
Note: Pos = Position; G = Games played; AB = At bats; H = Hits; Avg. = Batting average; HR = Home runs; RBI = Runs batted in

Pos	Player	G	AB	H	Avg.	HR	RBI
C	Jack Boyle	75	288	73	.253	2	36
1B	Nap Lajoie	127	545	197	.361	9	127
2B	Phil Geier	92	316	88	.278	1	35
SS	Sam Gillen	75	270	70	.259	0	27
3B	Billy Nash	104	337	87	.258	0	39
OF	Ed Delahanty	129	530	200	.377	5	96
OF	Duff Cooley	133	566	186	.329	4	40
OF	Tommy Dowd	91	391	114	.292	0	43

==== Other batters ====
Note: G = Games played; AB = At bats; H = Hits; Avg. = Batting average; HR = Home runs; RBI = Runs batted in

Player	G	AB	H	Avg.	HR	RBI
Lave Cross	88	344	89	.259	3	51
Jack Clements	55	185	44	.238	6	36
Frank Shugart	40	163	41	.252	5	25
Ed McFarland	38	130	29	.223	1	16
Bill Hallman	31	126	33	.262	0	15
Mike Grady	4	13	2	.154	0	0
Sam Thompson	3	13	3	.231	0	3
Kohly Miller	3	11	2	.182	0	1
Ed Abbaticchio	3	10	3	.300	0	0
George Stallings	2	9	2	.222	0	0

=== Pitching ===
==== Starting pitchers ====
Note: G = Games pitched; IP = Innings pitched; W = Wins; L = Losses; ERA = Earned run average; SO = Strikeouts

Player	G	IP	W	L	ERA	SO
Jack Taylor	40	317.1	16	20	4.23	88
Al Orth	36	282.1	14	19	4.62	64
Jack Fifield	27	210.2	5	18	5.51	38
George Wheeler	26	191.0	11	10	3.96	35
Davey Dunkle	7	62.0	5	2	3.48	9
Kid Carsey	4	28.0	2	1	5.14	1
Tully Sparks	1	8.0	0	1	10.13	0
Tom Lipp	1	3.0	0	1	15.00	1

==== Other pitchers ====
Note: G = Games pitched; IP = Innings pitched; W = Wins; L = Losses; ERA = Earned run average; SO = Strikeouts

Player	G	IP	W	L	ERA	SO
Youngy Johnson	5	29.0	1	2	4.66	7
Bob Becker	5	24.0	0	2	5.62	10
