= 1897 St. Louis Browns season =

Major League Baseball season

1897 St. Louis Browns
- League: National League
- Ballpark: New Sportsman's Park
- City: St. Louis, Missouri
- Record: 29–102 (.221)
- League place: 12th
- Owners: Chris von der Ahe
- Managers: Tommy Dowd (6–22); Hugh Nicol (8–32); Bill Hallman (13–36); Chris von der Ahe (2–12)
- Stats: ESPN.com; Baseball Reference

The 1897 St. Louis Browns season was the team's 16th season in St. Louis, Missouri and its sixth season in the National League. The Browns went 29–102 during the season and finished in 12th place in the National League.

== Regular season ==
=== Season standings ===
National League
| Team | W | L | Pct. | GB | Home | Road |
|---|---|---|---|---|---|---|
| Boston Beaneaters | 93 | 39 | .705 | — | 54‍–‍12 | 39‍–‍27 |
| Baltimore Orioles | 90 | 40 | .692 | 2 | 51‍–‍15 | 39‍–‍25 |
| New York Giants | 83 | 48 | .634 | 9½ | 51‍–‍19 | 32‍–‍29 |
| Cincinnati Reds | 76 | 56 | .576 | 17 | 49‍–‍18 | 27‍–‍38 |
| Cleveland Spiders | 69 | 62 | .527 | 23½ | 49‍–‍16 | 20‍–‍46 |
| Washington Senators | 61 | 71 | .462 | 32 | 40‍–‍26 | 21‍–‍45 |
| Brooklyn Bridegrooms | 61 | 71 | .462 | 32 | 38‍–‍29 | 23‍–‍42 |
| Pittsburgh Pirates | 60 | 71 | .458 | 32½ | 38‍–‍27 | 22‍–‍44 |
| Chicago Colts | 59 | 73 | .447 | 34 | 36‍–‍30 | 23‍–‍43 |
| Philadelphia Phillies | 55 | 77 | .417 | 38 | 32‍–‍34 | 23‍–‍43 |
| Louisville Colonels | 52 | 78 | .400 | 40 | 34‍–‍31 | 18‍–‍47 |
| St. Louis Browns | 29 | 102 | .221 | 63½ | 18‍–‍41 | 11‍–‍61 |

=== Record vs. opponents ===
1897 National League record Sources:
| Team | BAL | BSN | BRO | CHI | CIN | CLE | LOU | NYG | PHI | PIT | STL | WAS |
|---|---|---|---|---|---|---|---|---|---|---|---|---|
| Baltimore | — | 6–6 | 9–3–2 | 9–3–3 | 6–6 | 7–4 | 10–1 | 5–7 | 10–2–1 | 9–3 | 10–2 | 9–3 |
| Boston | 6–6 | — | 9–3 | 8–4–1 | 9–3 | 7–5 | 9–3 | 8–4 | 10–2–1 | 10–2 | 10–2 | 7–5–1 |
| Brooklyn | 3–9–2 | 3–9 | — | 6–6 | 7–5 | 7–5 | 5–7 | 3–9–2 | 6–6 | 7–5 | 7–5 | 7–5 |
| Chicago | 3–9–3 | 4–8–1 | 6–6 | — | 5–7 | 4–8 | 6–6–1 | 5–7–1 | 5–7 | 6–6 | 8–4 | 7–5 |
| Cincinnati | 6–6 | 3–9 | 5–7 | 7–5 | — | 7–5 | 9–3 | 7–5–1 | 8–4 | 5–7–1 | 11–1 | 8–4 |
| Cleveland | 4–7 | 5–7 | 5–7 | 8–4 | 5–7 | — | 5–7 | 3–9 | 9–3 | 6–6 | 11–1–1 | 8–4 |
| Louisville | 1–10 | 3–9 | 7–5 | 6–6–1 | 3–9 | 7–5 | — | 6–6–1 | 3–9 | 4–8–2 | 8–3–1 | 4–8–1 |
| New York | 7–5 | 4–8 | 9–3–2 | 7–5–1 | 5–7–1 | 9–3 | 6–6–1 | — | 7–5 | 8–3–1 | 12–0 | 9–3–1 |
| Philadelphia | 2–10–1 | 2–10–1 | 6–6 | 7–5 | 4–8 | 3–9 | 9–3 | 5–7 | — | 5–7 | 8–4 | 4–8 |
| Pittsburgh | 3–9 | 2–10 | 5–7 | 6–6 | 7–5–1 | 6–6 | 8–4–2 | 3–8–1 | 7–5 | — | 8–4 | 5–7 |
| St. Louis | 2–10 | 2–10 | 5–7 | 4–8 | 1–11 | 1–11–1 | 3–8–1 | 0–12 | 4–8 | 4–8 | — | 3–9 |
| Washington | 3–9 | 5–7–1 | 5–7 | 5–7 | 4–8 | 4–8 | 8–4–1 | 3–9–1 | 8–4 | 7–5 | 9–3 | — |

=== Roster ===
1897 St. Louis Browns
Roster
| Pitchers: Kid Carsey; Percy Coleman; Red Donahue; Duke Esper; Roy Evans; John Grimes; Bill Hart; Bill Hutchison; Con Lucid; Mike McDermott; Willie Sudhoff | Catchers: Klondike Douglass; Ed McFarland; Morgan Murphy; Infielders: Lou Bierbauer; Roger Connor; Monte Cross; Mike Grady; Bill Hallman; Fred Hartman; John Houseman | Outfielders: Ed Biecher; Tommy Dowd; Dick Harley; Frank Huelsman; Bill Kissinger; Dan Lally; Tuck Turner | Manager: Tommy Dowd; Bill Hallman; Hugh Nicol; Chris von der Ahe |

== Player stats ==
=== Batting ===
==== Starters by position ====
Note: Pos = Position; G = Games played; AB = At bats; H = Hits; Avg. = Batting average; HR = Home runs; RBI = Runs batted in

| Pos | Player | G | AB | H | Avg. | HR | RBI |
|---|---|---|---|---|---|---|---|
| C | Klondike Douglass | 126 | 519 | 170 | .328 | 6 | 50 |
| 1B | Mike Grady | 84 | 326 | 91 | .279 | 8 | 57 |
| 2B | Bill Hallman | 79 | 298 | 66 | .221 | 0 | 26 |
| SS | Monte Cross | 132 | 465 | 133 | .286 | 4 | 55 |
| 3B | Fred Hartman | 125 | 519 | 158 | .304 | 2 | 67 |
| OF | Tuck Turner | 103 | 416 | 121 | .291 | 2 | 41 |
| OF | Dick Harley | 90 | 333 | 96 | .288 | 3 | 35 |
| OF | Dan Lally | 88 | 359 | 102 | .284 | 2 | 42 |

==== Other batters ====
Note: G = Games played; AB = At bats; H = Hits; Avg. = Batting average; HR = Home runs; RBI = Runs batted in

| Player | G | AB | H | Avg. | HR | RBI |
|---|---|---|---|---|---|---|
| John Houseman | 80 | 278 | 68 | .245 | 0 | 21 |
| Morgan Murphy | 63 | 211 | 36 | .171 | 0 | 12 |
| Tommy Dowd | 35 | 145 | 38 | .262 | 0 | 9 |
| Ed McFarland | 31 | 107 | 35 | .327 | 1 | 17 |
| Roger Connor | 22 | 83 | 19 | .229 | 1 | 12 |
| Lou Bierbauer | 12 | 46 | 10 | .217 | 0 | 1 |
| Bill Kissinger | 14 | 39 | 13 | .333 | 0 | 6 |
| Ed Biecher | 3 | 12 | 4 | .333 | 0 | 1 |
| Frank Huelsman | 2 | 7 | 2 | .286 | 0 | 0 |

=== Pitching ===
==== Starting pitchers ====
Note: G = Games pitched; IP = Innings pitched; W = Wins; L = Losses; ERA = Earned run average; SO = Strikeouts

| Player | G | IP | W | L | ERA | SO |
|---|---|---|---|---|---|---|
| Red Donahue | 46 | 348.0 | 10 | 35 | 6.13 | 64 |
| Bill Hart | 39 | 294.2 | 9 | 27 | 6.26 | 67 |
| Kid Carsey | 12 | 99.0 | 3 | 8 | 6.00 | 14 |
| Willie Sudhoff | 11 | 92.2 | 2 | 7 | 4.47 | 19 |
| Duke Esper | 8 | 61.1 | 1 | 6 | 5.28 | 8 |
| Con Lucid | 6 | 49.0 | 1 | 5 | 3.67 | 4 |
| Bill Hutchison | 6 | 40.0 | 1 | 4 | 6.08 | 5 |
| Mike McDermott | 4 | 21.1 | 1 | 2 | 9.28 | 3 |

==== Other pitchers ====
Note: G = Games pitched; IP = Innings pitched; W = Wins; L = Losses; ERA = Earned run average; SO = Strikeouts

| Player | G | IP | W | L | ERA | SO |
|---|---|---|---|---|---|---|
| Percy Coleman | 13 | 66.1 | 1 | 2 | 7.19 | 10 |
| Bill Kissinger | 7 | 31.1 | 0 | 4 | 11.49 | 5 |
| John Grimes | 3 | 19.2 | 0 | 2 | 5.95 | 4 |

==== Relief pitchers ====
Note: G = Games pitched; W = Wins; L = Losses; SV = Saves; ERA = Earned run average; SO = Strikeouts

| Player | G | W | L | SV | ERA | SO |
|---|---|---|---|---|---|---|
| Roy Evans | 3 | 0 | 0 | 0 | 9.69 | 4 |
