= 1897 Cleveland Spiders season =

1897 Cleveland Spiders
- League: National League
- Ballpark: League Park
- City: Cleveland, Ohio
- Record: 69–62 (.527)
- League place: 5th
- Owners: Frank Robison
- Managers: Patsy Tebeau

The 1897 Cleveland Spiders finished with a 69–62 record and a fifth-place finish in the National League.

== Regular season ==
=== Season standings ===
National League
Team	W	L	Pct.	GB	Home	Road
Boston Beaneaters	93	39	.705	—	54‍–‍12	39‍–‍27
Baltimore Orioles	90	40	.692	2	51‍–‍15	39‍–‍25
New York Giants	83	48	.634	9½	51‍–‍19	32‍–‍29
Cincinnati Reds	76	56	.576	17	49‍–‍18	27‍–‍38
Cleveland Spiders	69	62	.527	23½	49‍–‍16	20‍–‍46
Washington Senators	61	71	.462	32	40‍–‍26	21‍–‍45
Brooklyn Bridegrooms	61	71	.462	32	38‍–‍29	23‍–‍42
Pittsburgh Pirates	60	71	.458	32½	38‍–‍27	22‍–‍44
Chicago Colts	59	73	.447	34	36‍–‍30	23‍–‍43
Philadelphia Phillies	55	77	.417	38	32‍–‍34	23‍–‍43
Louisville Colonels	52	78	.400	40	34‍–‍31	18‍–‍47
St. Louis Browns	29	102	.221	63½	18‍–‍41	11‍–‍61

=== Record vs. opponents ===
1897 National League record Sources:
Team	BAL	BSN	BRO	CHI	CIN	CLE	LOU	NYG	PHI	PIT	STL	WAS
Baltimore	—	6–6	9–3–2	9–3–3	6–6	7–4	10–1	5–7	10–2–1	9–3	10–2	9–3
Boston	6–6	—	9–3	8–4–1	9–3	7–5	9–3	8–4	10–2–1	10–2	10–2	7–5–1
Brooklyn	3–9–2	3–9	—	6–6	7–5	7–5	5–7	3–9–2	6–6	7–5	7–5	7–5
Chicago	3–9–3	4–8–1	6–6	—	5–7	4–8	6–6–1	5–7–1	5–7	6–6	8–4	7–5
Cincinnati	6–6	3–9	5–7	7–5	—	7–5	9–3	7–5–1	8–4	5–7–1	11–1	8–4
Cleveland	4–7	5–7	5–7	8–4	5–7	—	5–7	3–9	9–3	6–6	11–1–1	8–4
Louisville	1–10	3–9	7–5	6–6–1	3–9	7–5	—	6–6–1	3–9	4–8–2	8–3–1	4–8–1
New York	7–5	4–8	9–3–2	7–5–1	5–7–1	9–3	6–6–1	—	7–5	8–3–1	12–0	9–3–1
Philadelphia	2–10–1	2–10–1	6–6	7–5	4–8	3–9	9–3	5–7	—	5–7	8–4	4–8
Pittsburgh	3–9	2–10	5–7	6–6	7–5–1	6–6	8–4–2	3–8–1	7–5	—	8–4	5–7
St. Louis	2–10	2–10	5–7	4–8	1–11	1–11–1	3–8–1	0–12	4–8	4–8	—	3–9
Washington	3–9	5–7–1	5–7	5–7	4–8	4–8	8–4–1	3–9–1	8–4	7–5	9–3	—

=== Roster ===
1897 Cleveland Spiders
Roster
Pitchers: Charlie Brown; Henry Clarke; George Cuppy; Mike McDermott; John Pappalau; Jack Powell; Zeke Wilson; Cy Young	Catchers: Lou Criger; Chief Zimmer; Infielders: Cupid Childs; Ed McKean; Patsy Tebeau; Bobby Wallace	Outfielders: Ira Belden; Harry Blake; Jesse Burkett; Fred Cooke; Dale Gear; Jimmy McAleer; Sport McAllister; Jack O'Connor; Ollie Pickering; Chief Sockalexis	Manager: Patsy Tebeau

== Player stats ==
=== Batting ===
==== Starters by position ====
Note: Pos = Position; G = Games played; AB = At bats; H = Hits; Avg. = Batting average; HR = Home runs; RBI = Runs batted in

Pos	Player	G	AB	H	Avg.	HR	RBI
C	Chief Zimmer	80	294	93	.316	0	40
1B	Patsy Tebeau	109	412	110	.267	0	59
2B	Cupid Childs	114	444	150	.338	1	61
3B	Bobby Wallace	130	516	173	.335	4	112
SS	Ed McKean	125	523	143	.273	2	78
OF	Jesse Burkett	127	517	198	.383	2	60
OF	Jack O'Connor	103	397	115	.290	2	69
OF	Chief Sockalexis	66	278	94	.338	3	42

==== Other batters ====
Note: G = Games played; AB = At bats; H = Hits; Avg. = Batting average; HR = Home runs; RBI = Runs batted in

Player	G	AB	H	Avg.	HR	RBI
Ollie Pickering	46	182	64	.352	1	22
Sport McAllister	43	137	30	.219	0	11
Lou Criger	39	138	31	.225	0	22
Harry Blake	32	117	30	.256	1	15
Jimmy McAleer	24	91	20	.220	0	10
Ira Belden	8	30	8	.267	0	4
Dale Gear	7	24	4	.167	0	2
Fred Cooke	5	17	5	.294	0	3

=== Pitching ===
==== Starting pitchers ====
Note: G = Games pitched; IP = Innings pitched; W = Wins; L = Losses; ERA = Earned run average; SO = Strikeouts

Player	G	IP	W	L	ERA	SO
Cy Young	46	333.2	21	19	3.80	88
Zeke Wilson	34	263.2	16	11	4.16	69
Jack Powell	27	225.0	15	10	3.16	61
George Cuppy	19	139.1	10	6	3.17	23
Mike McDermott	9	62.0	4	5	4.50	12
Henry Clarke	5	30.2	0	4	6.16	3
Charlie Brown	4	24.1	1	2	7.77	8

==== Other pitchers ====
Note: G = Games pitched; IP = Innings pitched; W = Wins; L = Losses; ERA = Earned run average; SO = Strikeouts

Player	G	IP	W	L	ERA	SO
Sport McAllister	4	28.0	1	2	4.50	10
John Pappalau	2	12.0	0	1	10.50	3
