= Howie Jones =

Howie Jones may refer to:

- Howie Jones (baseball)
- Howie Jones (rugby union)
