= 1897 Cincinnati Reds season =

1897 Cincinnati Reds
- League: National League
- Ballpark: League Park
- City: Cincinnati
- Record: 76–56 (.576)
- League place: 4th
- Owners: John T. Brush
- Managers: Buck Ewing

The 1897 Cincinnati Reds season was a season in American baseball. The team finished in fourth place in the National League with a record of 76–56, 17 games behind the Boston Beaneaters.

== Offseason ==
The Cincinnati Reds were coming off a fairly successful season in 1896. They had been in first place late in the year, but the team struggled badly over the last part of the season. to finish in third place in the National League with a 77–50 record. This marked the second consecutive season that the Reds collapsed at the end of the year.

Player-manager Buck Ewing returned to the club, but would retire from playing and focus on just being the manager. The Reds made a deal in the off-season, as Cincinnati traded away Germany Smith, Chauncey Fisher and $1,000 to the Brooklyn Bridegrooms for Tommy Corcoran. Corcoran was coming off a season in which he hit .289 with three home runs and 73 RBI with the Bridegrooms in 1896. The team also purchased pitcher Ted Breitenstein from the St. Louis Browns for $10,000. Breitenstein was 18–26 with the Browns with a 4.48 ERA in 43 starts in 1896. His best season had been in 1894 when he was 27–23 with a 4.79 ERA, while leading the National League with 50 starts, 46 complete games and 447.1 innings pitched. Breitenstein also led the NL with a 3.18 ERA in 1893 while in St. Louis.

== Regular season ==
=== Season summary ===
The Reds started the season off hot, winning their first six games, and would remain hot, as they were 19–7 in their first twenty-six games, only half a game behind the first place Baltimore Orioles. At that time, the New York Giants released Jake Beckley, and the Reds immediately signed him to take over first base. Despite their new addition, Cincinnati fell into a slump, winning only eight of eighteen games to fall into third place, 6.5 games behind the first place Orioles. The Reds then snapped out of their losing ways, as they won twelve of their next thirteen games to move back into second. However, they still remained 4.5 games out of first with a 39–18 record. Cincinnati remained in the pennant race until late August, when they went on a ten-game losing streak to fall into fourth place, eleven games out of first. They remained in fourth place for the rest of the season, finishing with a 76–56 record, 17 games behind the Boston Beaneaters.

=== Notable performances ===
Beckley, who the Reds acquired during the season, led the team offensively, batting .345 with seven home runs and 76 RBI, all team highs. Dusty Miller had another solid year, batting .316 with four homers and 70 RBI, while Tommy Corcoran batted .288 with three home runs and 57 RBI in his first year as a Red.

On the mound, Ted Breitenstein led the way, leading the team with a 23–12 record with a 3.62 ERA in 40 games, completing 32 of them. Billy Rhines was solid also, posting a record of 21–15 with a 4.08 ERA, while Frank Dwyer was 18–13 with an ERA of 3.78.

=== Season standings ===
National League
Team	W	L	Pct.	GB	Home	Road
Boston Beaneaters	93	39	.705	—	54‍–‍12	39‍–‍27
Baltimore Orioles	90	40	.692	2	51‍–‍15	39‍–‍25
New York Giants	83	48	.634	9½	51‍–‍19	32‍–‍29
Cincinnati Reds	76	56	.576	17	49‍–‍18	27‍–‍38
Cleveland Spiders	69	62	.527	23½	49‍–‍16	20‍–‍46
Washington Senators	61	71	.462	32	40‍–‍26	21‍–‍45
Brooklyn Bridegrooms	61	71	.462	32	38‍–‍29	23‍–‍42
Pittsburgh Pirates	60	71	.458	32½	38‍–‍27	22‍–‍44
Chicago Colts	59	73	.447	34	36‍–‍30	23‍–‍43
Philadelphia Phillies	55	77	.417	38	32‍–‍34	23‍–‍43
Louisville Colonels	52	78	.400	40	34‍–‍31	18‍–‍47
St. Louis Browns	29	102	.221	63½	18‍–‍41	11‍–‍61

=== Record vs. opponents ===
1897 National League record Sources:
Team	BAL	BSN	BRO	CHI	CIN	CLE	LOU	NYG	PHI	PIT	STL	WAS
Baltimore	—	6–6	9–3–2	9–3–3	6–6	7–4	10–1	5–7	10–2–1	9–3	10–2	9–3
Boston	6–6	—	9–3	8–4–1	9–3	7–5	9–3	8–4	10–2–1	10–2	10–2	7–5–1
Brooklyn	3–9–2	3–9	—	6–6	7–5	7–5	5–7	3–9–2	6–6	7–5	7–5	7–5
Chicago	3–9–3	4–8–1	6–6	—	5–7	4–8	6–6–1	5–7–1	5–7	6–6	8–4	7–5
Cincinnati	6–6	3–9	5–7	7–5	—	7–5	9–3	7–5–1	8–4	5–7–1	11–1	8–4
Cleveland	4–7	5–7	5–7	8–4	5–7	—	5–7	3–9	9–3	6–6	11–1–1	8–4
Louisville	1–10	3–9	7–5	6–6–1	3–9	7–5	—	6–6–1	3–9	4–8–2	8–3–1	4–8–1
New York	7–5	4–8	9–3–2	7–5–1	5–7–1	9–3	6–6–1	—	7–5	8–3–1	12–0	9–3–1
Philadelphia	2–10–1	2–10–1	6–6	7–5	4–8	3–9	9–3	5–7	—	5–7	8–4	4–8
Pittsburgh	3–9	2–10	5–7	6–6	7–5–1	6–6	8–4–2	3–8–1	7–5	—	8–4	5–7
St. Louis	2–10	2–10	5–7	4–8	1–11	1–11–1	3–8–1	0–12	4–8	4–8	—	3–9
Washington	3–9	5–7–1	5–7	5–7	4–8	4–8	8–4–1	3–9–1	8–4	7–5	9–3	—

=== Game log ===
Legend
Reds Win	Reds Loss	Game Tied/Postponed

1897 Game Log: 76–56 (Home: 49–18; Away: 27–38)
April: 6–1 (Home: 6–1; Away: 0–0)

#	Date	Opponent	Score	Stadium	Attendance	Record	Streak
1	April 22	Colts	8–7	League Park	10,000	1-0	W1
2	April 23	Colts	4–3	League Park	3,000	2-0	W2
3	April 24	Colts	4–3	League Park	5,000	3-0	W3
-	April 25	Colts	Postponed (rain); Makeup: April 23				
4	April 26	Spiders	6–3	League Park	3,500	4-0	W4
5	April 27	Spiders	7–3	League Park	5,000	5-0	W5
6	April 28	Spiders	5–0	League Park	3,000	6-0	W6
7	April 29	Pirates	7–8	League Park	400	6-1	L1
-	April 30	Pirates	Postponed (rain); Makeup: August 4				

May: 17–10 (Home: 14–4; Away: 3–6)

#	Date	Opponent	Score	Stadium	Attendance	Record	Streak
-	May 1	Pirates	Postponed (wet grounds); Makeup: August 9				
8	May 3	@ Spiders	2–6	League Park	4,500	6-2	L2
-	May 4	@ Spiders	Postponed (rain, site change); Makeup: August 5				
9	May 5	@ Spiders	3–2	League Park	2,000	7-2	W1
10	May 6	@ Pirates	1–3	Exposition Park	3,100	7-3	L1
11	May 7	@ Pirates	6–7	Exposition Park	3,000	7-4	L2
12	May 8	@ Pirates	1–9	Exposition Park	8,400	7-5	L3
13	May 9	@ Colts	2–5	West Side Park	16,700	7-6	L4
14	May 10	@ Colts	7–5	West Side Park	3,100	8-6	W1
15	May 11	@ Colts	6–5	West Side Park	1,200	9-6	W2
16	May 12	@ Colts	1–8	West Side Park	1,600	9-7	L1
17	May 13	Giants	7–3	League Park	3,000	10-7	W1
18	May 14	Giants	6–5	League Park	4,000	11-7	W2
19	May 15	Giants	9–7	League Park	4,000	12-7	W3
20	May 16	Colonels	7–6	League Park	15,000	13-7	W4
21	May 17	Phillies	3–2	League Park	4,000	14-7	W5
22	May 18	Phillies	13–2	League Park	3,000	15-7	W6
23	May 19	Phillies	7–6	League Park	3,000	16-7	W7
24	May 20	Orioles	11–10	League Park	7,000	17-7	W8
25	May 21	Orioles	6–5	League Park	8,000	18-7	W9
26	May 22	Orioles	12–10	League Park	15,000	19-7	W10
27	May 23	Bridegrooms	4–6	League Park	7,000	19-8	L1
28	May 24	Bridegrooms	4–6	League Park	3,000	19-9	L2
29	May 25	Bridegrooms	2–6	League Park	4,000	19-10	L3
30	May 27	Beaneaters	7–16	League Park	3,000	19-11	L4'
-	May 28	Beaneaters	Postponed (rain); Makeup: July 20				
31	May 29	Beaneaters	2–1	League Park	5,000	20-11	W1
32	May 30	Senators	8–7	League Park	7,000	21-11	W2
33	May 31 1	Senators	4–3	League Park	2,000	22-11	W3
34	May 31 2	Senators	4–3	League Park	9,000	23-11	W4

June: 10–6 (Home: 5–0; Away: 5–6)

#	Date	Opponent	Score	Stadium	Attendance	Record	Streak
35	June 2	@ Orioles	4–10	Union Park	5,965	23-12	L1
-	June 3	@ Orioles	Postponed (rain); Makeup: August 30				
-	June 4	@ Orioles	Postponed (rain); Makeup: August 27				
36	June 5	@ Phillies	6–1	National League Park	12,488	24-12	W1
37	June 7	@ Phillies	0–4	National League Park	3,449	24-13	L1
-	June 8	@ Phillies	Postponed (rain); Makeup: August 20				
-	June 9	@ Giants	Postponed (rain); Makeup: August 31				
-	June 10	@ Giants	Postponed (wet grounds); Makeup: September 3				
38	June 11	@ Giants	2–1	Polo Grounds	6,500	25-13	W1
39	June 12	@ Beaneaters	1–5	South End Grounds	8,500	25-14	L1
40	June 14	@ Beaneaters	3–5	South End Grounds	3,325	25-15	L2
41	June 15	@ Beaneaters	4–10	South End Grounds	2,600	25-16	L3
42	June 16	@ Bridegrooms	15–6	Eastern Park	2,714	26-16	W1
43	June 17	@ Bridegrooms	9–1	Eastern Park	2,524	27-16	W2
44	June 19	@ Bridegrooms	0–1	Eastern Park	5,454	27-17	L1
45	June 21	Browns	8–3	League Park	2,500	28-17	W1
46	June 22	Browns	7–3	League Park	4,000	29-17	W2
47	June 23	Browns	5–1	League Park	2,500	30-17	W3
48	June 26	Colonels	7–1	League Park	6,000	31-17	W4
49	June 27	Colonels	4–2	League Park	8,000	32-17	W5
-	June 28	@ Browns	Postponed (rain); Makeup: September 25				
-	June 29	@ Browns	Postponed (rain); Makeup: September 26				
50	June 30	@ Browns	3–0	New Sportsman's Park	2,500	33-17	W6

July: 17–10 (Home: 14–8; Away: 3–2)

#	Date	Opponent	Score	Stadium	Attendance	Record	Streak
51	July 1	@ Colonels	14–4	Eclipse Park	1,300	34-17	W7
52	July 2	@ Colonels	1–4	Eclipse Park	1,000	34-18	L1
53	July 3	@ Colonels	12–0	Eclipse Park	2,000	35-18	W1
54	July 4	Orioles	5–4	League Park	10,000	36-18	W2
-	July 5	Orioles	Postponed (rain); Makeup: July 6				
55	July 5	Orioles	8–5	League Park	11,000	37-18	W3
56	July 6	Orioles	10–3	League Park	4,000	38-18	W4
57	July 8	Phillies	6–3	League Park	4,000	39-18	W5
58	July 9	Phillies	7–19	League Park	2,300	39-19	L1
59	July 10	Phillies	6–3	League Park	4,000	40-19	W1
60	July 11	Colonels	9–4	League Park	4,200	41-19	W2
61	July 12	Giants	5–8	League Park	3,500	41-20	L1
62	July 13	Giants	5–4	League Park	4,500	42-20	W1
63	July 14	Giants	11–6	League Park	3,500	43-20	W2
64	July 15	Senators	5–16	League Park	3,200	43-21	L1
65	July 17	Senators	14–2	League Park	4,200	44-21	W1
66	July 18	Senators	4–3	League Park	8,000	45-21	W2
67	July 19	Beaneaters	3–9	League Park	8,000	45-22	L1
68	July 20 1	Beaneaters	3–9	League Park	N/A	45-23	L2
69	July 20 2	Beaneaters	12–1	League Park	10,200	46-23	W1
70	July 21	Beaneaters	6–10	League Park	6,000	46-24	L1
71	July 22	Bridegrooms	7–9	League Park	3,000	46-25	L2
-	July 24	Bridegrooms	Postponed (rain); Makeup: July 25				
72	July 25 1	Bridegrooms	7–4	League Park	N/A	47-25	W1
73	July 25 2	Bridegrooms	11–4	League Park	14,000	48-25	W2
-	July 26	@ Colts	Postponed (schedule change); Makeup: May 12				
74	July 27	@ Colts	3–4	West Side Park	3,800	48-26	L1
75	July 28	@ Colts	6–3	West Side Park	4,200	49-26	W1
76	July 30	Spiders	8–2	League Park	6,000	50-26	W2
77	July 31	Spiders	3–6	League Park	5,500	50-27	L1

August: 12–15 (Home: 9–5; Away: 3–10)

#	Date	Opponent	Score	Stadium	Attendance	Record	Streak
78	August 1	Spiders	12–5	League Park	8,000	51-27	W1
79	August 2	Pirates	9–2	League Park	3,000	52-27	W2
80	August 3	Pirates	6–7	League Park	2,700	52-28	L1
81	August 4 1	Pirates	14–3	League Park	N/A	53-28	W1
82	August 4 2	Pirates	3–3	League Park	3,500	53-28	W1
83	August 5	Spiders	5–4	League Park	3,000	54-28	W2
84	August 7	Colonels	5–0	League Park	4,000	55-28	W3
85	August 8	Colonels	2–8	League Park	7,000	55-29	L1
86	August 9 1	Pirates	5–7	League Park	N/A	55-30	L2
87	August 9 2	Pirates	8–1	League Park	7,000	56-30	W1
88	August 10	Browns	8–6	League Park	2,000	57-30	W2
89	August 11	Browns	6–5	League Park	2,000	58-30	W3
90	August 13	Colts	0–2	League Park	7,000	58-31	L1
91	August 14	Colts	9–10	League Park	7,000	58-32	L2
92	August 15	Colts	3–2	League Park	8,000	59-32	W1
-	August 16	Colts	Postponed (schedule change); Makeup: August 13				
93	August 19	@ Phillies	4–3	National League Park	2,154	60-32	W2
94	August 20 1	@ Phillies	2–6	National League Park	N/A	60-33	L1
95	August 20 2	@ Phillies	4–3	National League Park	4,263	61-33	W1
96	August 21	@ Phillies	1–8	National League Park	4,000	61-34	L1
-	August 23	@ Senators	Postponed (rain); Makeup: September 11				
97	August 24	@ Senators	9–6	Boundary Field	3,000	62-34	W1
98	August 25	@ Senators	0–4	Boundary Field	1,500	62-35	L1
99	August 26	@ Orioles	2–3	Union Park	3,943	62-36	L2
100	August 27 1	@ Orioles	0–5	Union Park	N/A	62-37	L3
101	August 27 2	@ Orioles	3–5	Union Park	7,039	62-38	L4
102	August 28	@ Orioles	2–7	Union Park	5,607	62-39	L5
103	August 30	@ Orioles	1–7	Union Park	3,205	62-40	L6
104	August 31 1	@ Giants	6–7	Polo Grounds	N/A	62-41	L7
105	August 31 2	@ Giants	1–9	Polo Grounds	11,000	62-42	L8

September/October: 14–14 (Home: 1–0; Away: 13–14)

#	Date	Opponent	Score	Stadium	Attendance	Record	Streak
106	September 1	@ Giants	7–8	Polo Grounds	4,100	62-43	L9
107	September 2	@ Giants	3–3	Polo Grounds	3,700	62-43	L9
108	September 3 1	@ Giants	11–1	Polo Grounds	N/A	63-43	W1
109	September 3 2	@ Giants	3–13	Polo Grounds	9,100	63-44	L1
110	September 4	@ Beaneaters	6–7	South End Grounds	6,500	63-45	L2
111	September 6 1	@ Beaneaters	5–3	South End Grounds	6,500	64-45	W1
112	September 6 2	@ Beaneaters	2–10	South End Grounds	12,000	64-46	L1
113	September 8	@ Bridegrooms	4–2	Eastern Park	1,120	65-46	W1
114	September 9	@ Bridegrooms	1–7	Eastern Park	1,728	65-47	L1
115	September 10	@ Bridegrooms	4–11	Eastern Park	1,521	65-48	L2
116	September 11 1	@ Senators	19–10	Boundary Field	N/A	66-48	W1
117	September 11 2	@ Senators	4–8	Boundary Field	3,000	66-49	L1
118	September 13	@ Senators	2–1	Boundary Field	3,000	67-49	W1
119	September 14	@ Senators	9–10	Boundary Field	4,000	67-50	L1
-	September 16	@ Spiders	Postponed (rain); Makeup: September 18				
120	September 17	@ Spiders	3–14	League Park	700	67-51	L2
121	September 18 1	@ Spiders	0–6	League Park	N/A	67-52	L3
122	September 18 2	@ Spiders	3–4	League Park	2,500	67-53	L4
123	September 19	Browns	5–4	League Park	2,000	68-53	W1
124	September 21	@ Pirates	11–3	Exposition Park	1,500	69-53	W2
125	September 22 1	@ Pirates	13–2	Exposition Park	N/A	70-53	W3
126	September 22 2	@ Pirates	4–8	Exposition Park	1,800	70-54	L1
-	September 23	@ Pirates	Postponed (schedule change); Makeup: September 22				
127	September 25 1	@ Browns	7–5	New Sportsman's Park	N/A	71-54	W1
128	September 25 2	@ Browns	8–7	New Sportsman's Park	3,000	72-54	W2
129	September 26 1	@ Browns	10–4	New Sportsman's Park	N/A	73-54	W3
130	September 26 2	@ Browns	8–6	New Sportsman's Park	N/A	74-54	W4
131	September 27	@ Browns	4–5	New Sportsman's Park	500	74-55	L1
-	September 30	@ Colonels	Postponed (unknown reason); Makeup: October 1				
132	October 1	@ Colonels	3–5	Eclipse Park	2,500	74-56	L2
133	October 2	@ Colonels	9–8	Eclipse Park	1,500	75-56	W1
134	October 3	@ Colonels	9–7	Eclipse Park	5,500	76-56	W2

=== Roster ===
1897 Cincinnati Reds
Roster
Pitchers: Ted Breitenstein; Stub Brown; Bill Dammann; Frank Dwyer; Red Ehret; Billy Rhines	Catchers: Heinie Peitz; Pop Schriver; Infielders: Jake Beckley; Tommy Corcoran; Buck Ewing; Charlie Irwin; Bid McPhee; Claude Ritchey; Farmer Vaughn	Outfielders: Eddie Burke; Bug Holliday; Dummy Hoy; Dusty Miller	Manager: Buck Ewing

== Player stats ==
=== Batting ===
==== Starters by position ====
Note: Pos = Position; G = Games played; AB = At bats; H = Hits; Avg. = Batting average; HR = Home runs; RBI = Runs batted in

Pos	Player	G	AB	H	Avg.	HR	RBI
C	Heinie Peitz	77	266	78	.293	1	44
1B	Jake Beckley	97	365	126	.345	7	76
2B	Bid McPhee	81	282	85	.301	1	39
SS	Claude Ritchey	101	337	95	.282	0	41
3B	Charlie Irwin	134	505	146	.289	0	74
OF	Eddie Burke	95	387	103	.266	1	41
OF	Dusty Miller	119	440	139	.316	4	70
OF	Dummy Hoy	128	497	145	.292	2	42

==== Other batters ====
Note: G = Games played; AB = At bats; H = Hits; Avg. = Batting average; HR = Home runs; RBI = Runs batted in

Player	G	AB	H	Avg.	HR	RBI
Tommy Corcoran	109	445	128	.288	3	57
Farmer Vaughn	54	199	58	.291	0	30
Bug Holliday	61	195	61	.313	2	20
Pop Schriver	61	178	54	.303	1	30
Buck Ewing	1	1	0	.000	0	0

=== Pitching ===
==== Starting pitchers ====
Note: G = Games pitched; IP = Innings pitched; W = Wins; L = Losses; ERA = Earned run average; SO = Strikeouts

Player	G	IP	W	L	ERA	SO
Ted Breitenstein	40	320.1	23	12	3.62	98
Billy Rhines	41	288.2	21	15	4.08	65
Frank Dwyer	37	247.1	18	13	3.78	41
Bill Dammann	16	95.0	6	4	4.74	21

==== Other pitchers ====
Note: G = Games pitched; IP = Innings pitched; W = Wins; L = Losses; ERA = Earned run average; SO = Strikeouts

Player	G	IP	W	L	ERA	SO
Red Ehret	34	184.1	8	10	4.78	43
Stub Brown	2	13.0	0	1	4.15	2
Heinie Peitz	2	8.0	0	1	7.88	0
