= Bob Becker =

Bob Becker may refer to:

- Bob Becker (baseball) (1875–1951), American Major League Baseball pitcher
- Bob Becker (composer) (born 1947), American percussionist and composer

== See also ==
- Robert O. Becker (1923–2008), American orthopedic surgeon
