= 1897 Brooklyn Bridegrooms season =

1897 Brooklyn Bridegrooms
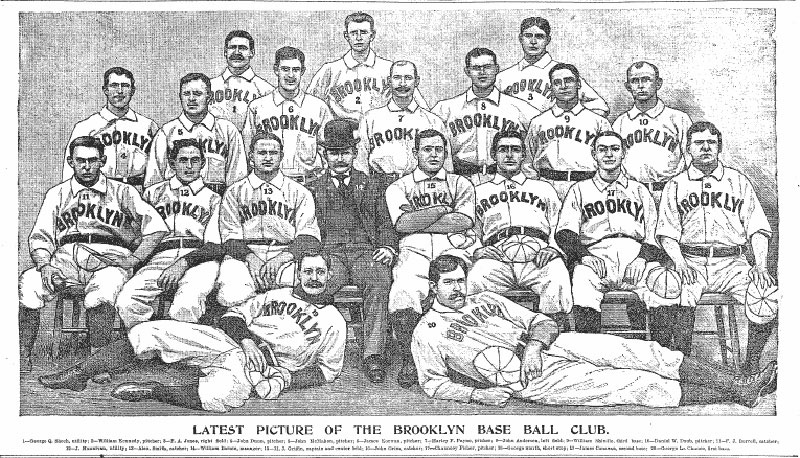
- League: National League
- Ballpark: Eastern Park
- City: Brooklyn, New York
- Record: 61–71 (.462)
- League place: T–6th
- Owners: Charles Byrne, Ferdinand Abell, Charles Ebbets
- President: Charles Byrne
- Managers: Billy Barnie

The 1897 Brooklyn Bridegrooms finished the season tied for sixth place under new manager Billy Barnie. Also the team's ownership underwent a change as Charles Byrne and Ferdinand Abell buy the shares previously owned by George Chauncey and Charles Ebbets becomes a part owner of the team.

== Offseason ==
- November 13, 1896: Tommy Corcoran was traded by the Bridegrooms to the Cincinnati Reds for Germany Smith, Chauncey Fisher and cash.
- Prior to 1897 season: Claude Ritchey was purchased from the Bridegrooms by the Cincinnati Reds.

== Regular season ==
=== Season standings ===
National League
Team	W	L	Pct.	GB	Home	Road
Boston Beaneaters	93	39	.705	—	54‍–‍12	39‍–‍27
Baltimore Orioles	90	40	.692	2	51‍–‍15	39‍–‍25
New York Giants	83	48	.634	9½	51‍–‍19	32‍–‍29
Cincinnati Reds	76	56	.576	17	49‍–‍18	27‍–‍38
Cleveland Spiders	69	62	.527	23½	49‍–‍16	20‍–‍46
Washington Senators	61	71	.462	32	40‍–‍26	21‍–‍45
Brooklyn Bridegrooms	61	71	.462	32	38‍–‍29	23‍–‍42
Pittsburgh Pirates	60	71	.458	32½	38‍–‍27	22‍–‍44
Chicago Colts	59	73	.447	34	36‍–‍30	23‍–‍43
Philadelphia Phillies	55	77	.417	38	32‍–‍34	23‍–‍43
Louisville Colonels	52	78	.400	40	34‍–‍31	18‍–‍47
St. Louis Browns	29	102	.221	63½	18‍–‍41	11‍–‍61

=== Record vs. opponents ===
1897 National League record Sources:
Team	BAL	BSN	BRO	CHI	CIN	CLE	LOU	NYG	PHI	PIT	STL	WAS
Baltimore	—	6–6	9–3–2	9–3–3	6–6	7–4	10–1	5–7	10–2–1	9–3	10–2	9–3
Boston	6–6	—	9–3	8–4–1	9–3	7–5	9–3	8–4	10–2–1	10–2	10–2	7–5–1
Brooklyn	3–9–2	3–9	—	6–6	7–5	7–5	5–7	3–9–2	6–6	7–5	7–5	7–5
Chicago	3–9–3	4–8–1	6–6	—	5–7	4–8	6–6–1	5–7–1	5–7	6–6	8–4	7–5
Cincinnati	6–6	3–9	5–7	7–5	—	7–5	9–3	7–5–1	8–4	5–7–1	11–1	8–4
Cleveland	4–7	5–7	5–7	8–4	5–7	—	5–7	3–9	9–3	6–6	11–1–1	8–4
Louisville	1–10	3–9	7–5	6–6–1	3–9	7–5	—	6–6–1	3–9	4–8–2	8–3–1	4–8–1
New York	7–5	4–8	9–3–2	7–5–1	5–7–1	9–3	6–6–1	—	7–5	8–3–1	12–0	9–3–1
Philadelphia	2–10–1	2–10–1	6–6	7–5	4–8	3–9	9–3	5–7	—	5–7	8–4	4–8
Pittsburgh	3–9	2–10	5–7	6–6	7–5–1	6–6	8–4–2	3–8–1	7–5	—	8–4	5–7
St. Louis	2–10	2–10	5–7	4–8	1–11	1–11–1	3–8–1	0–12	4–8	4–8	—	3–9
Washington	3–9	5–7–1	5–7	5–7	4–8	4–8	8–4–1	3–9–1	8–4	7–5	9–3	—

=== Roster ===
1897 Brooklyn Bridegrooms
Roster
Pitchers: John Brown; Dan Daub; Jack Dunn; Chauncey Fisher; Brickyard Kennedy; Sadie McMahon; Harley Payne	Catchers: Buster Burrell; John Grim; Aleck Smith; Infielders: Jim Canavan; Candy LaChance; Jimmy Sheckard; Billy Shindle; George Shoch; Germany Smith	Outfielders: John Anderson; Mike Griffin; Pat Hannivan; Fielder Jones	Manager: Billy Barnie

== Player stats ==
=== Batting ===
==== Starters by position ====
Note: Pos = Position; G = Games played; AB = At bats; R = Runs; H = Hits; Avg. = Batting average; HR = Home runs; RBI = Runs batted in; SB = Stolen bases

Pos	Player	G	AB	R	H	Avg.	HR	RBI	SB
C	John Grim	80	290	26	72	.248	0	25	3
1B	Candy LaChance	126	520	86	160	.308	4	90	26
2B	George Shoch	85	284	42	79	.278	0	38	6
3B	Billy Shindle	134	542	83	154	.284	4	105	23
SS	Germany Smith	112	428	47	86	.201	0	29	1
OF	Fielder Jones	135	548	134	172	.314	1	49	48
OF	Mike Griffin	134	534	136	169	.316	2	56	16
OF	John Anderson	117	492	93	160	.325	4	85	29

==== Other batters ====
Note: G = Games played; AB = At bats; R = Runs; H = Hits; Avg. = Batting average; HR = Home runs; RBI = Runs batted in; SB = Stolen bases

Player	G	AB	R	H	Avg.	HR	RBI	SB
Jim Canavan	63	240	25	52	.217	2	34	9
Aleck Smith	66	237	36	71	.300	1	39	12
Buster Burrell	33	103	15	25	.243	2	18	1
Jimmy Sheckard	13	49	12	14	.286	3	14	5
Pat Hannivan	10	20	4	5	.250	0	2	4

=== Pitching ===
==== Starting pitchers ====
Note: G = Games pitched; GS = Games started; IP = Innings pitched; W = Wins; L = Losses; ERA = Earned run average; BB = Bases on balls; SO = Strikeouts; CG = Complete games

Player	G	GS	IP	W	L	ERA	BB	SO	CG
Brickyard Kennedy	44	40	343.1	18	20	3.91	149	81	36
Harley Payne	40	38	280.0	14	17	4.63	71	86	30
Jack Dunn	25	21	216.2	14	9	4.57	66	26	21
Dan Daub	19	16	137.2	6	11	6.08	48	19	11
Sadie McMahon	9	7	63.0	0	6	5.86	29	13	5
John Brown	1	1	5.0	0	1	7.20	4	0	0

==== Other pitchers ====
Note: G = Games pitched; GS = Games started; IP = Innings pitched; W = Wins; L = Losses; ERA = Earned run average; BB = Bases on balls; SO = Strikeouts; CG = Complete games

Player	G	GS	IP	W	L	ERA	BB	SO	CG
Chauncey Fisher	20	13	149.0	9	7	4.23	43	31	11
