= 1897 Major League Baseball season =

1897 MLB season
- League: National League (NL)
- Sport: Baseball
- Duration: Regular season: April 19 – October 3, 1897; Temple Cup: October 4–11, 1897
- Games: 132
- Teams: 12

Pennant winner
- NL champions: Boston Beaneaters
- NL runners-up: Baltimore Orioles

Temple Cup
- Venue: South End Grounds, Boston, Massachusetts; Union Park, Baltimore, Maryland
- Champions: Baltimore Orioles
- Runners-up: Boston Beaneaters

MLB seasons
- ← 1896 1898 →

Locations of teams for the 1896–1897 National League seasons
National League

The 1897 major league baseball season began on April 19, 1897. The regular season ended on October 3, with the Boston Beaneaters as the pennant winner of the National League and the Baltimore Orioles as runner-up. The postseason began with Game 1 of the fourth Temple Cup on October 4 and ended with Game 5 on October 11. The Orioles defeated the Beaneaters, four games to one, capturing their second consecutive Temple Cup.

Due to lack of enthusiasm from both players and fans, and the perception that the Temple Cup was more of an exhibition contest than a true championship contest, the 1897 Temple Cup would be the final version of the championship series. Aside from the 1900 Chronicle-Telegraph Cup, this would be the last championship series until the birth of the modern World Series in 1903.

== Schedule ==
The 1897 schedule consisted of 132 games for the twelve teams of the National League. Each team was scheduled to play 12 games against the other eleven teams in the league. This continued the format put in place since 1893 and was the last season to use the format, which saw an extension of the schedule to 154 games the following season.

Opening Day took place on April 19 featuring a game between the Philadelphia Phillies and Boston Beaneaters. The final day of the season was on October 3, featuring four teams. The Temple Cup took place between October 4 and October 11, with two exhibition games breaking up the series played on October 7–8 between Games 3 and 4.

== Rule changes ==
The 1897 season saw the following rule changes:

- A new rule eliminating on-field coaches when the bases were empty was implemented. If a runner got on, one base coach was permitted. With two or more runners on base, both coaching boxes could be filled.
- Team captains were now prohibited from leaving his position on the field in order to dispute an umpire’s ruling (this included outfielders).
- If a stolen base figured in the scoring of a run, that run would be considered unearned.
- The power to appoint official game scorers was conferred upon the league president, a move designed to eliminate hometown favoritism in base-hit and error rulings.

== Teams ==
League	Team	City	Ballpark	Capacity	Manager
National League	Baltimore Orioles	Baltimore, Maryland	Union Park	6,500	Ned Hanlon
National League	Boston Beaneaters	Boston, Massachusetts	South End Grounds	6,600	Frank Selee
National League	Brooklyn Bridegrooms	Brooklyn, New York	Eastern Park	12,000	Billy Barnie
National League	Chicago Colts	Chicago, Illinois	West Side Park	13,000	Cap Anson
National League	Cincinnati Reds	Cincinnati, Ohio	League Park (Cincinnati)	9,000	Buck Ewing
National League	Cleveland Spiders	Cleveland, Ohio	League Park (Cleveland)	9,000	Patsy Tebeau
National League	Louisville Colonels	Louisville, Kentucky	Eclipse Park	6,400	Jim Rogers
National League	Louisville Colonels	Louisville, Kentucky	Eclipse Park	6,400	Fred Clarke
National League	New York Giants	New York, New York	Polo Grounds	16,000	Bill Joyce
National League	Philadelphia Phillies	Philadelphia, Pennsylvania	National League Park	18,000	George Stallings
National League	Pittsburgh Pirates	Allegheny, Pennsylvania	Exposition Park	6,500	Patsy Donovan
National League	St. Louis Browns	St. Louis, Missouri	New Sportsman's Park	14,500	Tommy Dowd
National League	St. Louis Browns	St. Louis, Missouri	New Sportsman's Park	14,500	Hugh Nicol
National League	St. Louis Browns	St. Louis, Missouri	New Sportsman's Park	14,500	Bill Hallman
National League	St. Louis Browns	St. Louis, Missouri	New Sportsman's Park	14,500	Chris von der Ahe
National League	Washington Senators	Washington, D.C.	Boundary Field	6,500	Gus Schmelz
National League	Washington Senators	Washington, D.C.	Boundary Field	6,500	Tom Brown

1. In today's New York, New York.
2. In today's Pittsburgh, Pennsylvania.

== Standings ==
=== National League ===
National League
Team	W	L	Pct.	GB	Home	Road
Boston Beaneaters	93	39	.705	—	54‍–‍12	39‍–‍27
Baltimore Orioles	90	40	.692	2	51‍–‍15	39‍–‍25
New York Giants	83	48	.634	9½	51‍–‍19	32‍–‍29
Cincinnati Reds	76	56	.576	17	49‍–‍18	27‍–‍38
Cleveland Spiders	69	62	.527	23½	49‍–‍16	20‍–‍46
Washington Senators	61	71	.462	32	40‍–‍26	21‍–‍45
Brooklyn Bridegrooms	61	71	.462	32	38‍–‍29	23‍–‍42
Pittsburgh Pirates	60	71	.458	32½	38‍–‍27	22‍–‍44
Chicago Colts	59	73	.447	34	36‍–‍30	23‍–‍43
Philadelphia Phillies	55	77	.417	38	32‍–‍34	23‍–‍43
Louisville Colonels	52	78	.400	40	34‍–‍31	18‍–‍47
St. Louis Browns	29	102	.221	63½	18‍–‍41	11‍–‍61

=== Tie games ===
23 tie games, which are not factored into winning percentage or games behind (and were often replayed again), occurred throughout the season.

- Baltimore Orioles, 6
- Boston Beaneaters, 3
- Brooklyn Bridegrooms, 4
- Chicago Colts, 6
- Cincinnati Reds, 2
- Cleveland Spiders, 1
- Louisville Colonels, 6
- New York Giants, 7
- Philadelphia Phillies, 2
- Pittsburgh Pirates, 4
- St. Louis Browns, 2
- Washington Senators, 3

== Postseason ==
=== Bracket ===
Temple Cup
NL1	Boston Beaneaters	13	11	3	11	3
NL2	Baltimore Orioles	12	13	8^{7}	12	9

== Managerial changes ==
=== Off-season ===
Team	Former Manager	New Manager
Brooklyn Bridegrooms	Dave Foutz	Billy Barnie
Louisville Colonels	Bill McGunnigle	Jim Rogers
Philadelphia Phillies	Billy Nash	George Stallings
Pittsburgh Pirates	Connie Mack	Patsy Donovan

=== In-season ===
Team	Former Manager	New Manager
Louisville Colonels	Jim Rogers	Fred Clarke
St. Louis Browns	Tommy Dowd	Hugh Nicol
St. Louis Browns	Hugh Nicol	Bill Hallman
St. Louis Browns	Bill Hallman	Chris von der Ahe
Washington Senators	Gus Schmelz	Tom Brown

== League leaders ==
=== National League ===
Hitting leaders
Stat	Player	Total
AVG	Willie Keeler (BAL)	.424
OPS	Willie Keeler (BAL)	1.003
HR	Hugh Duffy (BSN)	11
RBI	George Davis (NYG)	135
R	Billy Hamilton (BSN)	152
H	Willie Keeler (BAL)	239
SB	Bill Lange (CHI)	73

Pitching leaders
Stat	Player	Total
W	Kid Nichols (BSN)	31
L	Red Donahue (STL)	35
ERA	Amos Rusie (NYG)	2.54
K	Doc McJames (WAS); Cy Seymour (NYG)	156
IP	Kid Nichols (BSN)	368.0
SV	Win Mercer (WAS); Kid Nichols (BSN)	3
WHIP	Kid Nichols (BSN)	1.168

== Milestones ==
=== Batters ===
- Cap Anson (CHI):
  - Recorded his 3,000th career hit with a single in the fourth inning against the Baltimore Orioles on July 18. He is the first player to reach 3,000 hits.

==== Other batting accomplishments ====
- Billy Hamilton (BSN):
  - Broke the major league record for most career stolen bases when he stole his 742nd base, June 1.

=== Pitchers ===
==== No-hitters ====
- Cy Young (CLE):
  - Young threw his first career no-hitter and the first no-hitter in franchise history, by defeating the Cincinnati Reds 6–0 in game 1 of a doubleheader on September 18. Young walked none, hit one by pitch, and struck out three, though three batters reached due to fielding errors.

== Home field attendance ==
Team name	Wins	%±	Home attendance	%±	Per game
New York Giants	83	29.7%	390,340	42.5%	5,136
Cincinnati Reds	76	−1.3%	336,800	−9.7%	4,953
Boston Beaneaters	93	25.7%	334,800	39.5%	4,997
Chicago Colts	59	−16.9%	327,160	3.0%	4,883
Philadelphia Phillies	55	−11.3%	290,027	−18.8%	4,329
Baltimore Orioles	90	0.0%	273,046	9.5%	3,957
Brooklyn Bridegrooms	61	5.2%	220,831	9.9%	3,155
Pittsburgh Pirates	60	−9.1%	165,950	−15.8%	2,553
Washington Senators	61	5.2%	151,028	−32.3%	2,221
Louisville Colonels	52	36.8%	145,210	9.2%	2,135
St. Louis Browns	29	−27.5%	136,400	−25.9%	2,236
Cleveland Spiders	69	−13.8%	115,250	−24.2%	1,773

== See also ==
- 1897 in baseball (Events, Births, Deaths)
