= Dave Wright (baseball) =

American baseball player (1875–1946)

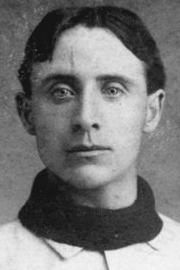
- Pitcher
- Born: August 27, 1875; Dennison, Ohio
- Died: January 18, 1946 (aged 70); Dennison, Ohio
- Batted: Right Threw: Right

MLB debut
- July 22, 1895, for the Pittsburgh Pirates

Last MLB appearance
- September 28, 1897, for the Chicago Colts

MLB statistics
- Win–loss record: 1–0
- Strikeouts: 4
- Earned run average: 18.00
- Stats at Baseball Reference

Teams
- Pittsburgh Pirates (1895); Chicago Colts (1897)

David William Wright (August 27, 1875 – January 18, 1946) was an American professional baseball pitcher. He appeared in two games in Major League Baseball, one for the Pittsburgh Pirates in 1895 and one for the Chicago Colts in 1897.

== Sources ==
- Career statistics from Baseball Reference · Baseball Reference (Minors) · Retrosheet · Baseball Almanac
