= 1897 Chicago Colts season =

1897 Chicago Colts
- League: National League
- Ballpark: West Side Park
- City: Chicago
- Record: 59–73 (.447)
- League place: 9th
- Owner: Albert Spalding
- Managers: Cap Anson

The 1897 Chicago Colts season was the 26th season of the Chicago Colts franchise, the 22nd in the National League and the fifth at West Side Park. The Colts finished ninth in the National League with a record of 59–73.

While on the surface the season seemed to be uneventful, on June 29, the Colts beat the Louisville Colonels 36–7, the most runs ever scored by a team in a single game.

== Regular season ==
=== Season standings ===
National League
Team	W	L	Pct.	GB	Home	Road
Boston Beaneaters	93	39	.705	—	54‍–‍12	39‍–‍27
Baltimore Orioles	90	40	.692	2	51‍–‍15	39‍–‍25
New York Giants	83	48	.634	9½	51‍–‍19	32‍–‍29
Cincinnati Reds	76	56	.576	17	49‍–‍18	27‍–‍38
Cleveland Spiders	69	62	.527	23½	49‍–‍16	20‍–‍46
Washington Senators	61	71	.462	32	40‍–‍26	21‍–‍45
Brooklyn Bridegrooms	61	71	.462	32	38‍–‍29	23‍–‍42
Pittsburgh Pirates	60	71	.458	32½	38‍–‍27	22‍–‍44
Chicago Colts	59	73	.447	34	36‍–‍30	23‍–‍43
Philadelphia Phillies	55	77	.417	38	32‍–‍34	23‍–‍43
Louisville Colonels	52	78	.400	40	34‍–‍31	18‍–‍47
St. Louis Browns	29	102	.221	63½	18‍–‍41	11‍–‍61

=== Record vs. opponents ===
1897 National League record Sources:
Team	BAL	BSN	BRO	CHI	CIN	CLE	LOU	NYG	PHI	PIT	STL	WAS
Baltimore	—	6–6	9–3–2	9–3–3	6–6	7–4	10–1	5–7	10–2–1	9–3	10–2	9–3
Boston	6–6	—	9–3	8–4–1	9–3	7–5	9–3	8–4	10–2–1	10–2	10–2	7–5–1
Brooklyn	3–9–2	3–9	—	6–6	7–5	7–5	5–7	3–9–2	6–6	7–5	7–5	7–5
Chicago	3–9–3	4–8–1	6–6	—	5–7	4–8	6–6–1	5–7–1	5–7	6–6	8–4	7–5
Cincinnati	6–6	3–9	5–7	7–5	—	7–5	9–3	7–5–1	8–4	5–7–1	11–1	8–4
Cleveland	4–7	5–7	5–7	8–4	5–7	—	5–7	3–9	9–3	6–6	11–1–1	8–4
Louisville	1–10	3–9	7–5	6–6–1	3–9	7–5	—	6–6–1	3–9	4–8–2	8–3–1	4–8–1
New York	7–5	4–8	9–3–2	7–5–1	5–7–1	9–3	6–6–1	—	7–5	8–3–1	12–0	9–3–1
Philadelphia	2–10–1	2–10–1	6–6	7–5	4–8	3–9	9–3	5–7	—	5–7	8–4	4–8
Pittsburgh	3–9	2–10	5–7	6–6	7–5–1	6–6	8–4–2	3–8–1	7–5	—	8–4	5–7
St. Louis	2–10	2–10	5–7	4–8	1–11	1–11–1	3–8–1	0–12	4–8	4–8	—	3–9
Washington	3–9	5–7–1	5–7	5–7	4–8	4–8	8–4–1	3–9–1	8–4	7–5	9–3	—

== Roster ==
1897 Chicago Colts
Roster
Pitchers: Buttons Briggs; Roger Denzer; Danny Friend; Clark Griffith; Jim Korwan; Adonis Terry; Dave Wright	Catchers: Tim Donahue; Malachi Kittridge; Infielders: Cap Anson; Nixey Callahan; Jim Connor; Bill Dahlen; Bill Everitt; Barry McCormick; Fred Pfeffer	Outfielders: George Decker; Tom Hernon; Bill Lange; Jimmy Ryan; Walter Thornton	Manager: Cap Anson

== Player stats ==
=== Batting ===
==== Starters by position ====
Note: Pos = Position; G = Games played; AB = At bats; H = Hits; Avg. = Batting average; HR = Home runs; RBI = Runs batted in

Pos	Player	G	AB	H	Avg.	HR	RBI
C	Malachi Kittridge	79	262	53	.202	1	30
1B	Cap Anson	114	424	121	.285	3	75
2B	Jim Connor	77	285	83	.291	3	38
SS	Bill Dahlen	75	276	80	.290	6	40
3B	Bill Everitt	92	379	119	.314	5	39
OF	George Decker	111	428	124	.290	5	63
OF	Jimmy Ryan	136	520	156	.300	5	85
OF	Bill Lange	118	479	163	.340	5	83

==== Other batters ====
Note: G = Games played; AB = At bats; H = Hits; Avg. = Batting average; HR = Home runs; RBI = Runs batted in

Player	G	AB	H	Avg.	HR	RBI
Barry McCormick	101	419	112	.267	2	55
Nixey Callahan	94	360	105	.292	3	47
Walter Thornton	75	265	85	.321	0	55
Tim Donahue	58	188	45	.239	0	21
Fred Pfeffer	32	114	26	.228	0	11
Tom Hernon	4	16	1	.063	0	2

=== Pitching ===
==== Starting pitchers ====
Note: G = Games pitched; IP = Innings pitched; W = Wins; L = Losses; ERA = Earned run average; SO = Strikeouts

Player	G	IP	W	L	ERA	SO
Clark Griffith	41	343.2	21	18	3.72	102
Danny Friend	24	203.0	12	11	4.52	58
Nixey Callahan	23	189.1	12	9	4.03	52
Buttons Briggs	22	186.2	4	17	5.26	60
Walter Thornton	16	130.1	6	7	4.70	55
Roger Denzer	12	94.2	2	8	5.13	17
Jim Korwan	5	34.0	1	2	5.82	12
Adonis Terry	1	8.0	0	1	10.13	1
Dave Wright	1	7.0	1	0	15.43	4
