= Ted Breitenstein =

American baseball player (1869–1935)

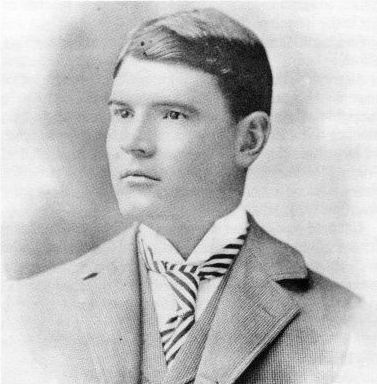
- Breienstein c. 1900
- Pitcher
- Born: June 1, 1869; St. Louis, Missouri, U.S.
- Died: May 3, 1935 (aged 65); St. Louis, Missouri, U.S.
- Batted: Left Threw: Left

Major league debut
- April 28, 1891, for the St. Louis Browns

Last major league appearance
- May 9, 1901, for the St. Louis Cardinals

Major league statistics
- Win–loss record: 160–170
- Earned run average: 4.03
- Strikeouts: 893
- Stats at Baseball Reference

Teams
- St. Louis Browns (1891–1896); Cincinnati Reds (1897–1900); St. Louis Cardinals (1901)

Career highlights and awards
- NL ERA leader (1893); Pitched two no-hitters (1891, 1898)

Theodore P. "Breit" Breitenstein (June 1, 1869 – May 3, 1935) was an American Major League Baseball pitcher from St. Louis, Missouri who played from 1891 to 1901 for the St. Louis Browns/Cardinals and the Cincinnati Reds. He is best known for throwing a no-hitter in his first Major League start, along with the "Pretzel Battery" with fellow German-American battery mate Heinie Peitz.

== Major League Baseball career ==
During his first season in the majors, Breitenstein pitched occasionally in relief, but on the final day of the 1891 season, October 4, Breitenstein was allowed to start and he pitched a no-hitter against the Louisville Colonels, an 8–0 victory. He faced the minimum number of batters of 27, allowed just one base on balls, which was erased by a double play or by a pickoff play. It was also the last no-hitter thrown in the American Association, as the league folded after the season.

Breitenstein became part of the pitching rotation in 1892, but had a lackluster season with a 9–19 win–loss record and a 4.69 earned run average. He turned his pitching around after that, and in 1893, his 3.18 ERA was tops in the National League. In 1894, he won 27 games while leading the league in games started, complete games and innings pitched, although he led the league in runs allowed, and had a 4.79 ERA. In the following season, his workload stayed the same, leading the league in games started and complete games once again, but his stats took a slide downward, leading the league in runs allowed, base on balls, and losses. His 30 losses in 1895 ranks third on the all-time list for losses in a season by a pitcher.

After a similar season in 1896, Breitenstein was sold to the Cincinnati Reds. The move gave him a new start and he took advantage of it, winning more than 20 games in each of his first two season with the Reds. He lowered his ERA to 3.62 in 1897 and 3.42 in 1898 respectively. On April 22, 1898, he pitched his second no-hitter, this time against the Pittsburgh Pirates, an 11–0 victory. What made this no-hitter notable is the fact that another no-hitter was pitched on the same day. Jay Hughes of the Baltimore Orioles threw one against the Boston Beaneaters. This was the first occurrence of two no-hitters being thrown on the same day in the major leagues.

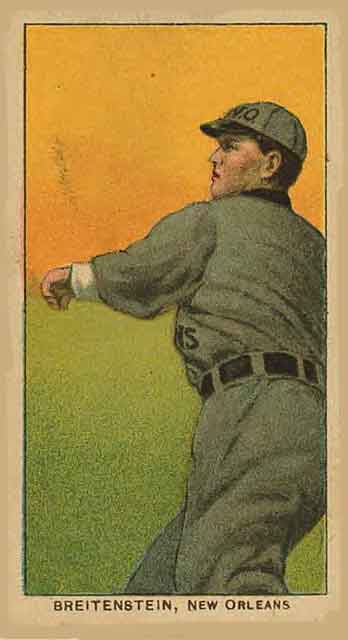
Breitenstein with the New Orleans Pelicans

Breitenstein's next two seasons in Cincinnati were respectable, but his skills had shown that they were declining, not able to pitch with the same durability of seasons past. He was released by the Reds and returned to his old team in St. Louis, now known as the Cardinals. His major league career ended after only a few games in 1901.

== Later life ==
Breitenstein went on to a lengthy minor league baseball career, most notably with the New Orleans Pelicans of the Southern Association. He played eight seasons for the Pelicans, ten years in all with the Association. He was then an umpire in the Association. During World War I, Breitenstein was named as a director of an athletic camp especially organized for Army and Navy soldiers. He died in St. Louis, Missouri at the age of 65, and is interred in Saint Peter's Cemetery in Normandy, Missouri.

== See also ==
- List of Major League Baseball annual ERA leaders
- List of Major League Baseball no-hitters
- List of St. Louis Cardinals team records

Achievements
Preceded by Cy Young	National League ERA Champion; 1893	Succeeded by Amos Rusie
Preceded by Amos Rusie; Cy Young	No-hitter pitcher October 4, 1891; April 22, 1898	Succeeded by Jack Stivetts; Jay Hughes
