= 1897 Louisville Colonels season =

1897 Louisville Colonels
- League: National League
- Ballpark: Eclipse Park II
- City: Louisville, Kentucky
- Record: 52–87 (.374)
- League place: 11th
- Owners: Barney Dreyfuss
- Managers: Jim Rogers, Fred Clarke

The 1897 Louisville Colonels baseball team finished with a 52–87 record and eleventh place in the National League.

== Regular season ==
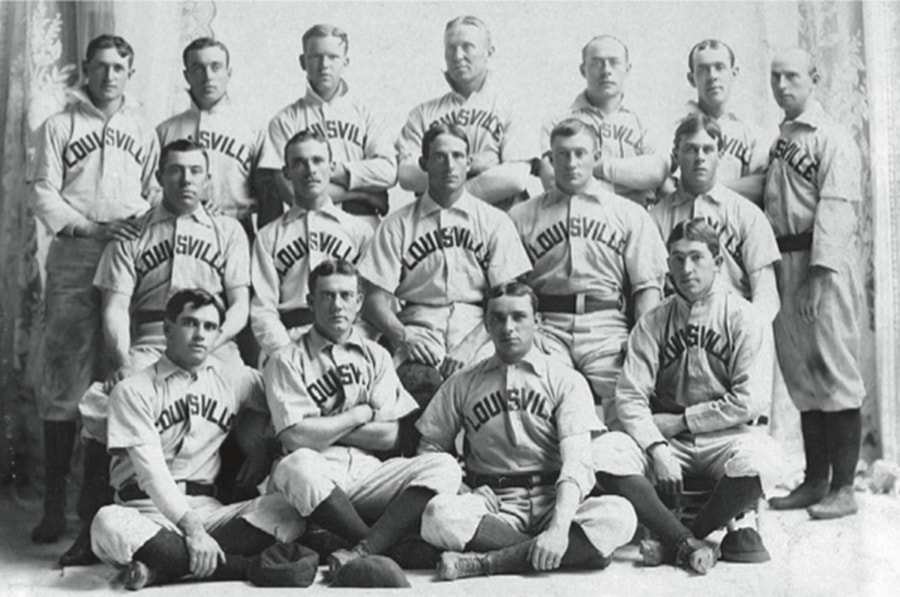
1897 Louisville Colonels

=== Season standings ===
National League
Team	W	L	Pct.	GB	Home	Road
Boston Beaneaters	93	39	.705	—	54‍–‍12	39‍–‍27
Baltimore Orioles	90	40	.692	2	51‍–‍15	39‍–‍25
New York Giants	83	48	.634	9½	51‍–‍19	32‍–‍29
Cincinnati Reds	76	56	.576	17	49‍–‍18	27‍–‍38
Cleveland Spiders	69	62	.527	23½	49‍–‍16	20‍–‍46
Washington Senators	61	71	.462	32	40‍–‍26	21‍–‍45
Brooklyn Bridegrooms	61	71	.462	32	38‍–‍29	23‍–‍42
Pittsburgh Pirates	60	71	.458	32½	38‍–‍27	22‍–‍44
Chicago Colts	59	73	.447	34	36‍–‍30	23‍–‍43
Philadelphia Phillies	55	77	.417	38	32‍–‍34	23‍–‍43
Louisville Colonels	52	78	.400	40	34‍–‍31	18‍–‍47
St. Louis Browns	29	102	.221	63½	18‍–‍41	11‍–‍61

=== Record vs. opponents ===
1897 National League record Sources:
Team	BAL	BSN	BRO	CHI	CIN	CLE	LOU	NYG	PHI	PIT	STL	WAS
Baltimore	—	6–6	9–3–2	9–3–3	6–6	7–4	10–1	5–7	10–2–1	9–3	10–2	9–3
Boston	6–6	—	9–3	8–4–1	9–3	7–5	9–3	8–4	10–2–1	10–2	10–2	7–5–1
Brooklyn	3–9–2	3–9	—	6–6	7–5	7–5	5–7	3–9–2	6–6	7–5	7–5	7–5
Chicago	3–9–3	4–8–1	6–6	—	5–7	4–8	6–6–1	5–7–1	5–7	6–6	8–4	7–5
Cincinnati	6–6	3–9	5–7	7–5	—	7–5	9–3	7–5–1	8–4	5–7–1	11–1	8–4
Cleveland	4–7	5–7	5–7	8–4	5–7	—	5–7	3–9	9–3	6–6	11–1–1	8–4
Louisville	1–10	3–9	7–5	6–6–1	3–9	7–5	—	6–6–1	3–9	4–8–2	8–3–1	4–8–1
New York	7–5	4–8	9–3–2	7–5–1	5–7–1	9–3	6–6–1	—	7–5	8–3–1	12–0	9–3–1
Philadelphia	2–10–1	2–10–1	6–6	7–5	4–8	3–9	9–3	5–7	—	5–7	8–4	4–8
Pittsburgh	3–9	2–10	5–7	6–6	7–5–1	6–6	8–4–2	3–8–1	7–5	—	8–4	5–7
St. Louis	2–10	2–10	5–7	4–8	1–11	1–11–1	3–8–1	0–12	4–8	4–8	—	3–9
Washington	3–9	5–7–1	5–7	5–7	4–8	4–8	8–4–1	3–9–1	8–4	7–5	9–3	—

=== Roster ===
1897 Louisville Colonels
Roster
Pitchers: Dad Clarke; Bert Cunningham; Pete Dowling; Roy Evans; Chick Fraser; George Hemming; Art Herman; Bill Hill; Jim Jones; Bill Magee; Bert Miller; Rube Waddell; Catchers: Dick Butler; Ossee Schreckengost; Bill Wilson	Infielders: Win Clark; Billy Clingman; Tom Delahanty; Joe Dolan; Irv Hach; Ducky Holmes; Abbie Johnson; Frank Martin; Jim Rogers; Heinie Smith; General Stafford; Perry Werden	Outfielders: Fred Clarke; Charlie Dexter; Tom McCreery; Kid Nance; Ollie Pickering; Honus Wagner	Manager: Fred Clarke; Jim Rogers

== Player stats ==
=== Batting ===
==== Starters by position ====
Note: Pos = Position; G = Games played; AB = At bats; H = Hits; Avg. = Batting average; HR = Home runs; RBI = Runs batted in

Pos	Player	G	AB	H	Avg.	HR	RBI
C	Bill Wilson	105	381	81	.213	1	41
1B	Perry Werden	133	512	154	.301	5	83
2B	Jim Rogers	41	150	22	.147	2	22
SS	General Stafford	113	441	122	.277	7	54
3B	Billy Clingman	115	403	92	.228	2	47
OF	Tom McCreery	91	344	96	.279	4	40
OF	Fred Clarke	128	518	202	.390	6	67
OF	Ollie Pickering	64	249	62	.249	1	21

==== Other batters ====
Note: G = Games played; AB = At bats; H = Hits; Avg. = Batting average; HR = Home runs; RBI = Runs batted in

Player	G	AB	H	Avg.	HR	RBI
Charlie Dexter	76	257	72	.280	2	46
Honus Wagner	62	242	81	.335	2	39
Abbie Johnson	49	165	40	.242	0	23
Joe Dolan	36	133	28	.211	0	7
Kid Nance	35	120	29	.242	3	17
Heinie Smith	21	76	20	.263	1	7
Irv Hach	16	51	11	.216	0	3
Dick Butler	10	38	7	.184	0	2
Win Clark	4	16	3	.188	0	2
Frank Martin	2	8	2	.250	0	0
Ducky Holmes	2	4	0	.000	0	0
Tom Delahanty	1	4	1	.250	0	2
Ossee Schrecongost	1	3	0	.000	0	0

=== Pitching ===
==== Starting pitchers ====
Note: G = Games pitched; IP = Innings pitched; W = Wins; L = Losses; ERA = Earned run average; SO = Strikeouts

Player	G	IP	W	L	ERA	SO
Chick Fraser	36	294.1	15	19	4.04	70
Bert Cunningham	30	242.2	14	13	4.15	49
Bill Hill	27	199.0	7	17	3.62	55
Bill Magee	23	156.1	4	12	5.41	44
George Hemming	9	67.0	3	4	5.10	7
Roy Evans	9	59.1	5	4	4.10	20
Dad Clarke	7	54.2	2	4	3.95	7
Pete Dowling	4	26.0	1	2	5.88	3

==== Other pitchers ====
Note: G = Games pitched; IP = Innings pitched; W = Wins; L = Losses; ERA = Earned run average; SO = Strikeouts

Player	G	IP	W	L	ERA	SO
Art Herman	3	18.0	0	1	4.00	4
Bert Miller	4	17.0	0	1	7.94	3
Rube Waddell	2	14.0	0	1	3.21	5

==== Relief pitchers ====
Note: G = Games pitched; W = Wins; L = Losses; SV = Saves; ERA = Earned run average; SO = Strikeouts

Player	G	W	L	SV	ERA	SO
Jim Jones	1	0	0	0	18.90	0
