= Charlie Brown (baseball) =

American baseball player (1871–1938)

- Pitcher
- Born: August 17, 1871; Bluffton, Indiana, U.S.
- Died: April 3, 1938 (aged 66); Monclova, Ohio, U.S.
- Batted: Unknown Threw: Left

MLB debut
- August 4, 1897, for the Cleveland Spiders

Last MLB appearance
- August 14, 1897, for the Cleveland Spiders

MLB statistics
- Win–loss record: 1–2
- Earned run average: 7.77
- Strikeouts: 8
- Stats at Baseball Reference

Teams
- Cleveland Spiders (1897)

Charles Edward Brown (August 17, 1871 – April 3, 1938) was an American professional baseball pitcher. He started four games for the Cleveland Spiders of Major League Baseball in 1897, with one win and two losses.
