= 1897 Boston Beaneaters season =

1897 Boston Beaneaters
- National League champions Temple Cup runners-up
- League: National League
- Ballpark: South End Grounds
- City: Boston, Massachusetts
- Record: 93–39–3 (.705)
- League place: 1st
- Owners: Arthur Soden
- Managers: Frank Selee (8th season)

The 1897 Boston Beaneaters season was the 27th season of the franchise. The Beaneaters went 93–39–3 (.705), finishing 2.0 games ahead of the second-place Baltimore Orioles and winning the National League pennant, their fourth of the decade and their seventh overall. After the season, the Beaneaters played in the Temple Cup for the first time. They lost the series to the Orioles, 4 games to 1.

== Regular season ==
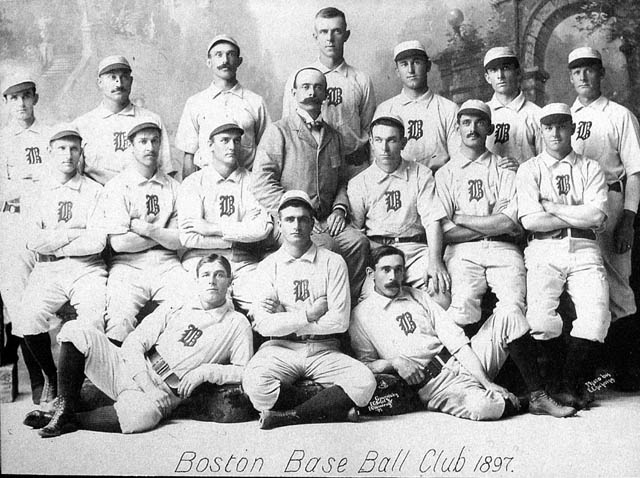
1897 Boston Beaneaters

This team has been cited (along with the 1880s St. Louis Browns and the 1890s Baltimore Orioles) as one of the greatest of the 19th century. It featured five Hall of Famers: manager Frank Selee, pitcher Kid Nichols, third baseman Jimmy Collins, and outfielders Billy Hamilton and Hugh Duffy.

In just 132 games, the Beaneaters scored 1025 runs to lead the league (Hamilton had 152 of them to win individual honors). They also allowed the fewest, on the way to a .705 winning percentage. Nichols was one of the premier pitchers in the league, leading the NL with 31 wins. His 2.64 ERA ranked second.

=== Season standings ===
National League
Team	W	L	Pct.	GB	Home	Road
Boston Beaneaters	93	39	.705	—	54‍–‍12	39‍–‍27
Baltimore Orioles	90	40	.692	2	51‍–‍15	39‍–‍25
New York Giants	83	48	.634	9½	51‍–‍19	32‍–‍29
Cincinnati Reds	76	56	.576	17	49‍–‍18	27‍–‍38
Cleveland Spiders	69	62	.527	23½	49‍–‍16	20‍–‍46
Washington Senators	61	71	.462	32	40‍–‍26	21‍–‍45
Brooklyn Bridegrooms	61	71	.462	32	38‍–‍29	23‍–‍42
Pittsburgh Pirates	60	71	.458	32½	38‍–‍27	22‍–‍44
Chicago Colts	59	73	.447	34	36‍–‍30	23‍–‍43
Philadelphia Phillies	55	77	.417	38	32‍–‍34	23‍–‍43
Louisville Colonels	52	78	.400	40	34‍–‍31	18‍–‍47
St. Louis Browns	29	102	.221	63½	18‍–‍41	11‍–‍61

=== Record vs. opponents ===
1897 National League record Sources:
Team	BAL	BSN	BRO	CHI	CIN	CLE	LOU	NYG	PHI	PIT	STL	WAS
Baltimore	—	6–6	9–3–2	9–3–3	6–6	7–4	10–1	5–7	10–2–1	9–3	10–2	9–3
Boston	6–6	—	9–3	8–4–1	9–3	7–5	9–3	8–4	10–2–1	10–2	10–2	7–5–1
Brooklyn	3–9–2	3–9	—	6–6	7–5	7–5	5–7	3–9–2	6–6	7–5	7–5	7–5
Chicago	3–9–3	4–8–1	6–6	—	5–7	4–8	6–6–1	5–7–1	5–7	6–6	8–4	7–5
Cincinnati	6–6	3–9	5–7	7–5	—	7–5	9–3	7–5–1	8–4	5–7–1	11–1	8–4
Cleveland	4–7	5–7	5–7	8–4	5–7	—	5–7	3–9	9–3	6–6	11–1–1	8–4
Louisville	1–10	3–9	7–5	6–6–1	3–9	7–5	—	6–6–1	3–9	4–8–2	8–3–1	4–8–1
New York	7–5	4–8	9–3–2	7–5–1	5–7–1	9–3	6–6–1	—	7–5	8–3–1	12–0	9–3–1
Philadelphia	2–10–1	2–10–1	6–6	7–5	4–8	3–9	9–3	5–7	—	5–7	8–4	4–8
Pittsburgh	3–9	2–10	5–7	6–6	7–5–1	6–6	8–4–2	3–8–1	7–5	—	8–4	5–7
St. Louis	2–10	2–10	5–7	4–8	1–11	1–11–1	3–8–1	0–12	4–8	4–8	—	3–9
Washington	3–9	5–7–1	5–7	5–7	4–8	4–8	8–4–1	3–9–1	8–4	7–5	9–3	—

=== Roster ===
1897 Boston Beaneaters
Roster
Pitchers: Charlie Hickman; Fred Klobedanz; Ted Lewis; Kid Nichols; Jim Sullivan	Catchers: Marty Bergen; Charlie Ganzel; Fred Lake; Mike Mahoney; George Yeager; Infielders: Bob Allen; Jimmy Collins; Herman Long; Bobby Lowe; Fred Tenney; Tommy Tucker	Outfielders: Hugh Duffy; Billy Hamilton; Chick Stahl; Jack Stivetts	Manager: Frank Selee

== Player stats ==
=== Batting ===
==== Starters by position ====
Note: Pos = Position; G = Games played; AB = At bats; H = Hits; Avg. = Batting average; HR = Home runs; RBI = Runs batted in

Pos	Player	G	AB	H	Avg.	HR	RBI
C	Marty Bergen	87	327	81	.248	2	45
1B	Fred Tenney	132	566	180	.318	1	85
2B	Bobby Lowe	123	499	154	.309	5	106
3B	Jimmy Collins	134	529	183	.346	6	132
SS	Herman Long	107	450	145	.322	3	69
OF	Hugh Duffy	134	550	187	.340	11	129
OF	Billy Hamilton	127	507	174	.343	3	61
OF	Chick Stahl	114	469	166	.354	4	97

==== Other batters ====
Note: G = Games played; AB = At bats; H = Hits; Avg. = Batting average; HR = Home runs; RBI = Runs batted in

Player	G	AB	H	Avg.	HR	RBI
Jack Stivetts	61	199	73	.367	2	37
Bob Allen	34	119	38	.319	1	24
Charlie Ganzel	30	105	28	.267	0	14
George Yeager	30	95	23	.242	2	15
Fred Lake	19	62	15	.242	0	5
Tommy Tucker	4	14	3	.214	0	4
Mike Mahoney	2	2	1	.500	0	1

=== Pitching ===
==== Starting pitchers ====
Note: G = Games pitched; IP = Innings pitched; W = Wins; L = Losses; ERA = Earned run average; SO = Strikeouts

Player	G	IP	W	L	ERA	SO
Kid Nichols	46	368.0	31	11	2.64	127
Fred Klobedanz	38	309.1	26	7	4.60	92
Ted Lewis	38	290.0	21	12	3.85	65
Jack Stivetts	18	129.1	11	4	3.41	27

==== Other pitchers ====
Note: G = Games pitched; IP = Innings pitched; W = Wins; L = Losses; ERA = Earned run average; SO = Strikeouts

Player	G	IP	W	L	ERA	SO
Jim Sullivan	13	89.0	4	5	3.94	17

==== Relief pitchers ====
Note: G = Games pitched; W = Wins; L = Losses; SV = Saves; ERA = Earned run average; SO = Strikeouts

Player	G	W	L	SV	ERA	SO
Charlie Hickman	2	0	0	1	5.87	0
Mike Mahoney	1	0	0	0	18.00	1

== Awards and honors ==
=== League top ten finishers ===
Jimmy Collins

- #2 in NL in RBI (132)

Hugh Duffy

- NL leader in home runs (11)
- #3 in NL in RBI (129)

Sliding Billy Hamilton

- NL leader in runs scored (152)
- #3 in NL in stolen bases (66)

Fred Klobedanz

- #3 in NL in wins (26)

Kid Nichols

- NL leader in wins (31)
- #2 in NL in ERA (2.64)
