= Irv Hach =

American baseball player (1873–1936)

- Second baseman/Third baseman
- Born: June 5, 1873; Louisville, Kentucky, U.S.
- Died: August 13, 1936 (aged 63); Louisville, Kentucky, U.S.
- Batted: Right Threw: Right

MLB debut
- July 1, 1897, for the Louisville Colonels

Last MLB appearance
- July 17, 1897, for the Louisville Colonels

MLB statistics
- Games played: 16
- At bats: 51
- Hits: 11
- Stats at Baseball Reference

Teams
- Louisville Colonels (1897)

Irvin William Hach (1873–1936) was a Major League Baseball second baseman and third baseman. He played for the 1897 Louisville Colonels.

== Sources ==
- Career statistics from Baseball Reference · Baseball Reference (Minors) · Retrosheet · Baseball Almanac
