= 1897 New York Giants season =

1897 New York Giants
- League: National League
- Ballpark: Polo Grounds
- City: New York City
- Record: 83–48 (.634)
- League place: 3rd
- Owners: Andrew Freedman
- Managers: Bill Joyce

The 1897 New York Giants season was the franchise's 15th season. The team finished in third place in the National League with an 83–48 record, 9.5 games behind the Boston Beaneaters.

== Regular season ==
=== Season standings ===
National League
Team	W	L	Pct.	GB	Home	Road
Boston Beaneaters	93	39	.705	—	54‍–‍12	39‍–‍27
Baltimore Orioles	90	40	.692	2	51‍–‍15	39‍–‍25
New York Giants	83	48	.634	9½	51‍–‍19	32‍–‍29
Cincinnati Reds	76	56	.576	17	49‍–‍18	27‍–‍38
Cleveland Spiders	69	62	.527	23½	49‍–‍16	20‍–‍46
Washington Senators	61	71	.462	32	40‍–‍26	21‍–‍45
Brooklyn Bridegrooms	61	71	.462	32	38‍–‍29	23‍–‍42
Pittsburgh Pirates	60	71	.458	32½	38‍–‍27	22‍–‍44
Chicago Colts	59	73	.447	34	36‍–‍30	23‍–‍43
Philadelphia Phillies	55	77	.417	38	32‍–‍34	23‍–‍43
Louisville Colonels	52	78	.400	40	34‍–‍31	18‍–‍47
St. Louis Browns	29	102	.221	63½	18‍–‍41	11‍–‍61

=== Record vs. opponents ===
1897 National League record Sources:
Team	BAL	BSN	BRO	CHI	CIN	CLE	LOU	NYG	PHI	PIT	STL	WAS
Baltimore	—	6–6	9–3–2	9–3–3	6–6	7–4	10–1	5–7	10–2–1	9–3	10–2	9–3
Boston	6–6	—	9–3	8–4–1	9–3	7–5	9–3	8–4	10–2–1	10–2	10–2	7–5–1
Brooklyn	3–9–2	3–9	—	6–6	7–5	7–5	5–7	3–9–2	6–6	7–5	7–5	7–5
Chicago	3–9–3	4–8–1	6–6	—	5–7	4–8	6–6–1	5–7–1	5–7	6–6	8–4	7–5
Cincinnati	6–6	3–9	5–7	7–5	—	7–5	9–3	7–5–1	8–4	5–7–1	11–1	8–4
Cleveland	4–7	5–7	5–7	8–4	5–7	—	5–7	3–9	9–3	6–6	11–1–1	8–4
Louisville	1–10	3–9	7–5	6–6–1	3–9	7–5	—	6–6–1	3–9	4–8–2	8–3–1	4–8–1
New York	7–5	4–8	9–3–2	7–5–1	5–7–1	9–3	6–6–1	—	7–5	8–3–1	12–0	9–3–1
Philadelphia	2–10–1	2–10–1	6–6	7–5	4–8	3–9	9–3	5–7	—	5–7	8–4	4–8
Pittsburgh	3–9	2–10	5–7	6–6	7–5–1	6–6	8–4–2	3–8–1	7–5	—	8–4	5–7
St. Louis	2–10	2–10	5–7	4–8	1–11	1–11–1	3–8–1	0–12	4–8	4–8	—	3–9
Washington	3–9	5–7–1	5–7	5–7	4–8	4–8	8–4–1	3–9–1	8–4	7–5	9–3	—

=== Roster ===
1897 New York Giants
Roster
Pitchers: Dad Clarke; Ed Doheny; Jouett Meekin; Amos Rusie; Cy Seymour; Mike Sullivan	Catchers: Jack Warner; Parke Wilson; Dave Zearfoss; Infielders: Jake Beckley; Willie Clark; George Davis; Jim Donnelly; Charlie Gettig; Kid Gleason; Bill Joyce; Yale Murphy	Outfielders: Ducky Holmes; Tom McCreery; General Stafford; Mike Tiernan; George Van Haltren; Walt Wilmot	Manager: Bill Joyce

== Player stats ==
=== Batting ===
==== Starters by position ====
Note: Pos = Position; G = Games played; AB = At bats; H = Hits; Avg. = Batting average; HR = Home runs; RBI = Runs batted in

Pos	Player	G	AB	H	Avg.	HR	RBI
C	Jack Warner	111	400	109	.273	2	51
1B	Willie Clark	117	436	122	.280	1	75
2B	Kid Gleason	132	543	172	.317	1	106
3B	Bill Joyce	109	388	118	.304	3	64
SS	George Davis	131	521	184	.353	10	135
OF	Mike Tiernan	128	532	174	.327	5	72
OF	George Van Haltren	130	566	186	.329	3	64
OF	Ducky Holmes	80	310	82	.265	1	45

==== Other batters ====
Note: G = Games played; AB = At bats; H = Hits; Avg. = Batting average; HR = Home runs; RBI = Runs batted in

Player	G	AB	H	Avg.	HR	RBI
Tom McCreery	49	177	53	.299	1	28
Parke Wilson	47	158	47	.297	0	23
Jim Donnelly	23	85	16	.188	0	11
Charlie Gettig	22	75	15	.200	0	12
Jake Beckley	17	68	17	.250	1	11
Walt Wilmot	11	34	9	.265	1	4
General Stafford	7	23	2	.087	0	3
Dave Zearfoss	5	10	3	.300	0	0
Yale Murphy	5	8	0	.000	0	1

=== Pitching ===
==== Starting pitchers ====
Note: G = Games pitched; IP = Innings pitched; W = Wins; L = Losses; ERA = Earned run average; SO = Strikeouts

Player	G	IP	W	L	ERA	SO
Amos Rusie	38	322.1	28	10	2.54	135
Jouett Meekin	37	303.2	20	11	3.76	83
Cy Seymour	39	286.2	18	14	3.27	156
Mike Sullivan	23	148.2	8	7	5.09	35
Ed Doheny	10	85.0	4	4	2.12	37

==== Other pitchers ====
Note: G = Games pitched; IP = Innings pitched; W = Wins; L = Losses; ERA = Earned run average; SO = Strikeouts

Player	G	IP	W	L	ERA	SO
Dad Clarke	6	31.0	2	1	6.10	10
Charlie Gettig	3	19.0	1	1	5.21	7
