= Bill Hallman (second baseman) =

American baseball player (1867–1920)

- Second baseman
- Born: March 31, 1867; Pittsburgh, Pennsylvania, U.S.
- Died: September 11, 1920 (aged 53); Philadelphia, Pennsylvania, U.S.
- Batted: Right Threw: Right

MLB debut
- April 23, 1888, for the Philadelphia Quakers

Last MLB appearance
- September 27, 1903, for the Philadelphia Phillies

MLB statistics
- Batting average: .272
- Home runs: 21
- Runs batted in: 772
- Stats at Baseball Reference

Teams
- As player: Philadelphia Quakers (1888–1889); Philadelphia Athletics (1890–1891); Philadelphia Phillies (1892–1897); St. Louis Browns (1897); Brooklyn Bridegrooms (1898); Cleveland Blues (1901); Philadelphia Phillies (1901–1903); As manager: St. Louis Browns (1897)

William Wilson Hallman (March 31, 1867 – September 11, 1920) was an American professional baseball player. He played in Major League Baseball (MLB) as a second baseman from 1888 to 1903. He played for six teams during his 14-year career, including one stint as a player-manager for the 1897 St. Louis Browns.

== Career ==
After spending two years with the Philadelphia Quakers, Hallman attempted to jump to the Philadelphia Athletics of the Players' League. When the Quakers sought a legal injunction against the move, the Philadelphia County Court of Common Pleas refused to enforce Hallman's contract with the Quakers. The court pointed out that the contract was so one-sided (allowing the team to dispense with Hallman for virtually any reason) that it was unenforceable.

Although he was primarily a second baseman, he did eventually play every position on the diamond, including one game as a pitcher in 1896. In 1897, Hallman was a player-manager for the St. Louis Cardinals. Hallman was 13-46 as a manager; he served as the third of four managers in a disastrous 29-102 season.

Hallman owns one significant Major League recorded as the only player in history to improve his batting average in nine consecutive seasons, beginning at .206 in 1888 and ending at .320 in 1896.

Though a handful of players of Hallman's generation also made appearances in theater, most of them were brief parts with little dialogue. Author Jerrold Casway wrote that Hallman and Mike Donlin were the only two ballplayers who could have traded in their baseball careers for careers in theater.

Hallman last appeared in the major leagues in 1903, but he continued playing or managing in the Western League or South Atlantic League through 1909.

Hallman's nephew Bill played in the majors for four seasons as an outfielder.

== Post-career ==
Hallman died at his Philadelphia home of heart disease after being sick for about four months. He was interred at the Holy Sepulchre Cemetery in Cheltenham, Pennsylvania.

== See also ==
- List of Major League Baseball career stolen bases leaders
- List of Major League Baseball player-managers
