= Ed Gerner =

American baseball player (1897–1970)

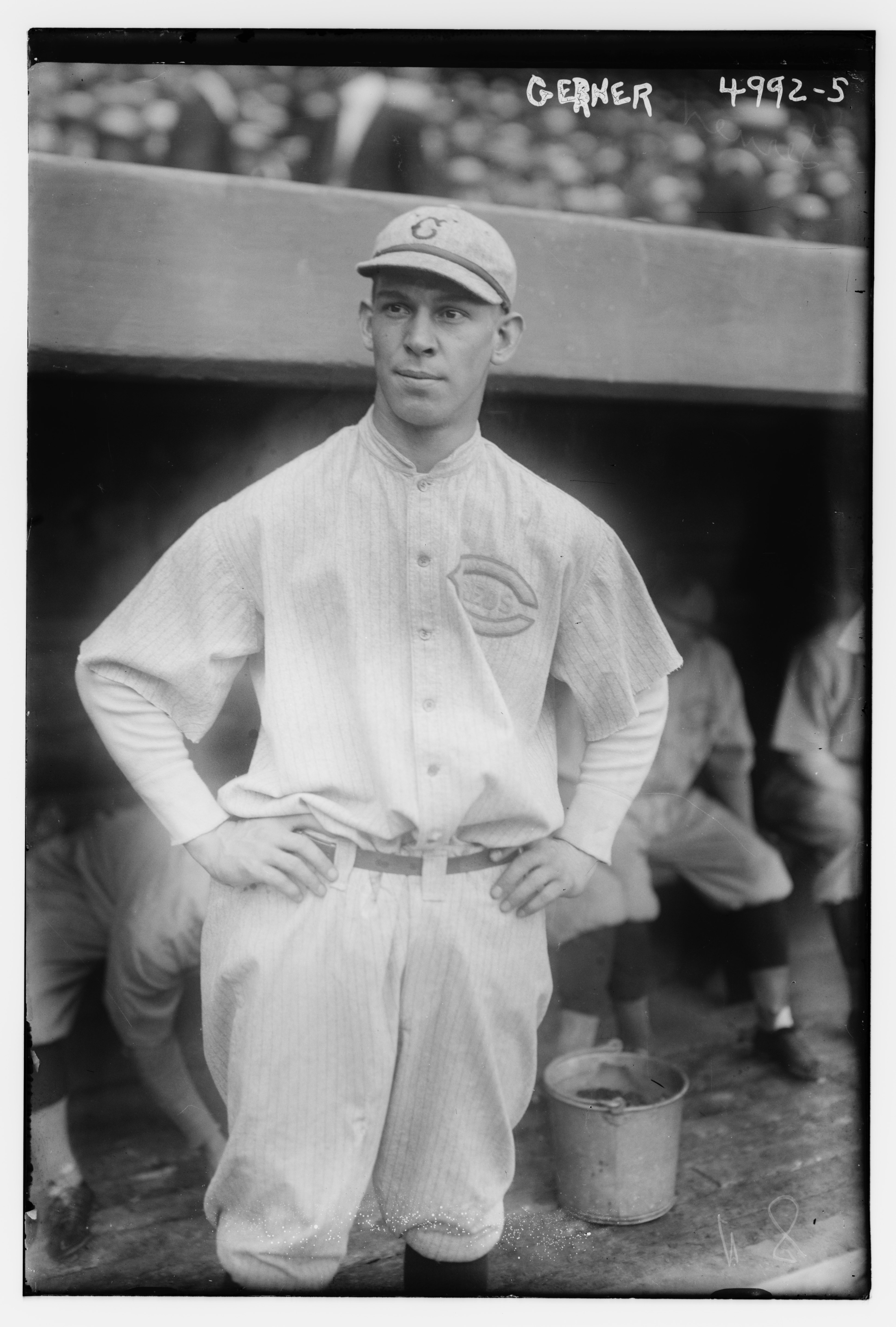
- Pitcher
- Born: July 22, 1897; Philadelphia, Pennsylvania, U.S.
- Died: May 15, 1970 (aged 72); Philadelphia, Pennsylvania, U.S.
- Batted: Left Threw: Left

MLB debut
- May 14, 1919, for the Cincinnati Reds

Last MLB appearance
- August 14, 1919, for the Cincinnati Reds

MLB statistics
- Win–loss record: 1–0
- Earned run average: 3.18
- Strikeouts: 2

Teams
- Cincinnati Reds (1919)

Edwin Frederick Gerner (July 22, 1897 – May 15, 1970), nicknamed "Lefty", was a Major League Baseball pitcher who played in five games for the Cincinnati Reds in 1919. In 17 innings over five games, Gerner posted a 1–0 record with a 3.18 earned run average with 22 hits allowed, 10 runs allowed (6 earned), 3 walks, 2 strikeouts and 2 hit by pitch.
