= 1897 Pittsburgh Pirates season =

1897 Pittsburgh Pirates
- League: National League
- Ballpark: Exposition Park
- City: Allegheny, Pennsylvania
- Record: 60–71 (.458)
- League place: 8th
- Owners: William Kerr and Phil Auten
- Managers: Patsy Donovan

The 1897 Pittsburgh (Note: Until early in the 20th century, the name of Pittsburgh was spelled both with and without the final 'h'.) Pirates season was the 16th season of the Pittsburgh Pirates franchise; their 11th in the National League. The Pirates finished eighth in the league standings with a record of 60–71.

== Regular season ==
=== Season standings ===
National League
Team	W	L	Pct.	GB	Home	Road
Boston Beaneaters	93	39	.705	—	54‍–‍12	39‍–‍27
Baltimore Orioles	90	40	.692	2	51‍–‍15	39‍–‍25
New York Giants	83	48	.634	9½	51‍–‍19	32‍–‍29
Cincinnati Reds	76	56	.576	17	49‍–‍18	27‍–‍38
Cleveland Spiders	69	62	.527	23½	49‍–‍16	20‍–‍46
Washington Senators	61	71	.462	32	40‍–‍26	21‍–‍45
Brooklyn Bridegrooms	61	71	.462	32	38‍–‍29	23‍–‍42
Pittsburgh Pirates	60	71	.458	32½	38‍–‍27	22‍–‍44
Chicago Colts	59	73	.447	34	36‍–‍30	23‍–‍43
Philadelphia Phillies	55	77	.417	38	32‍–‍34	23‍–‍43
Louisville Colonels	52	78	.400	40	34‍–‍31	18‍–‍47
St. Louis Browns	29	102	.221	63½	18‍–‍41	11‍–‍61

=== Record vs. opponents ===
1897 National League record Sources:
Team	BAL	BSN	BRO	CHI	CIN	CLE	LOU	NYG	PHI	PIT	STL	WAS
Baltimore	—	6–6	9–3–2	9–3–3	6–6	7–4	10–1	5–7	10–2–1	9–3	10–2	9–3
Boston	6–6	—	9–3	8–4–1	9–3	7–5	9–3	8–4	10–2–1	10–2	10–2	7–5–1
Brooklyn	3–9–2	3–9	—	6–6	7–5	7–5	5–7	3–9–2	6–6	7–5	7–5	7–5
Chicago	3–9–3	4–8–1	6–6	—	5–7	4–8	6–6–1	5–7–1	5–7	6–6	8–4	7–5
Cincinnati	6–6	3–9	5–7	7–5	—	7–5	9–3	7–5–1	8–4	5–7–1	11–1	8–4
Cleveland	4–7	5–7	5–7	8–4	5–7	—	5–7	3–9	9–3	6–6	11–1–1	8–4
Louisville	1–10	3–9	7–5	6–6–1	3–9	7–5	—	6–6–1	3–9	4–8–2	8–3–1	4–8–1
New York	7–5	4–8	9–3–2	7–5–1	5–7–1	9–3	6–6–1	—	7–5	8–3–1	12–0	9–3–1
Philadelphia	2–10–1	2–10–1	6–6	7–5	4–8	3–9	9–3	5–7	—	5–7	8–4	4–8
Pittsburgh	3–9	2–10	5–7	6–6	7–5–1	6–6	8–4–2	3–8–1	7–5	—	8–4	5–7
St. Louis	2–10	2–10	5–7	4–8	1–11	1–11–1	3–8–1	0–12	4–8	4–8	—	3–9
Washington	3–9	5–7–1	5–7	5–7	4–8	4–8	8–4–1	3–9–1	8–4	7–5	9–3	—

=== Roster ===
1897 Pittsburgh Pirates
Roster
Pitchers: Jim Gardner; Charlie Hastings; Pink Hawley; Jim Hughey; Frank Killen	Catchers: Bill Merritt; Joe Sugden; Infielders: Harry Davis; Jim Donnelly; Bones Ely; Jesse Hoffmeister; Charlie Kuhns; Denny Lyons; Dick Padden; Jack Rothfuss	Outfielders: Steve Brodie; Patsy Donovan; Tom Leahy; Mike Smith; Jesse Tannehill	Manager: Patsy Donovan

== Player stats ==
=== Batting ===
==== Starters by position ====
Note: Pos = Position; G = Games played; AB = At bats; H = Hits; Avg. = Batting average; HR = Home runs; RBI = Runs batted in

Pos	Player	G	AB	H	Avg.	HR	RBI
C	Joe Sugden	84	288	64	.222	0	38
1B	Harry Davis	111	429	131	.305	2	63
2B	Dick Padden	134	517	146	.282	2	58
SS	Bones Ely	133	516	146	.283	2	74
3B	Jesse Hoffmeister	48	188	58	.309	3	36
OF	Steve Brodie	100	370	108	.292	2	53
OF	Mike Smith	123	467	145	.310	6	54
OF	Patsy Donovan	120	479	154	.322	0	57

==== Other batters ====
Note: G = Games played; AB = At bats; H = Hits; Avg. = Batting average; HR = Home runs; RBI = Runs batted in

Player	G	AB	H	Avg.	HR	RBI
Bill Merritt	62	209	55	.263	1	26
Jesse Tannehill	56	184	49	.266	0	22
Jim Donnelly	44	161	31	.193	0	14
Denny Lyons	37	131	27	.206	2	17
Jack Rothfuss	35	115	36	.313	2	18
Tom Leahy	24	92	24	.261	0	12
Jim Gardner	27	76	12	.158	1	8
Charlie Kuhns	1	3	0	.000	0	0

=== Pitching ===
==== Starting pitchers ====
Note: G = Games pitched; IP = Innings pitched; W = Wins; L = Losses; ERA = Earned run average; SO = Strikeouts

Player	G	IP	W	L	ERA	SO
Frank Killen	42	337.1	17	23	4.46	99
Pink Hawley	40	311.1	18	18	4.80	88
Jim Hughey	25	149.1	6	10	5.06	38
Jesse Tannehill	21	142.0	9	9	4.25	40
Jim Gardner	14	95.1	5	5	5.19	35

==== Other pitchers ====
Note: G = Games pitched; IP = Innings pitched; W = Wins; L = Losses; ERA = Earned run average; SO = Strikeouts

Player	G	IP	W	L	ERA	SO
Charlie Hastings	16	118.0	5	4	4.58	42

== Uniforms ==
The team wore white and brown uniforms at home and gray and brown on the road.
