= Claude Ritchey =

American baseball player (1873–1951)

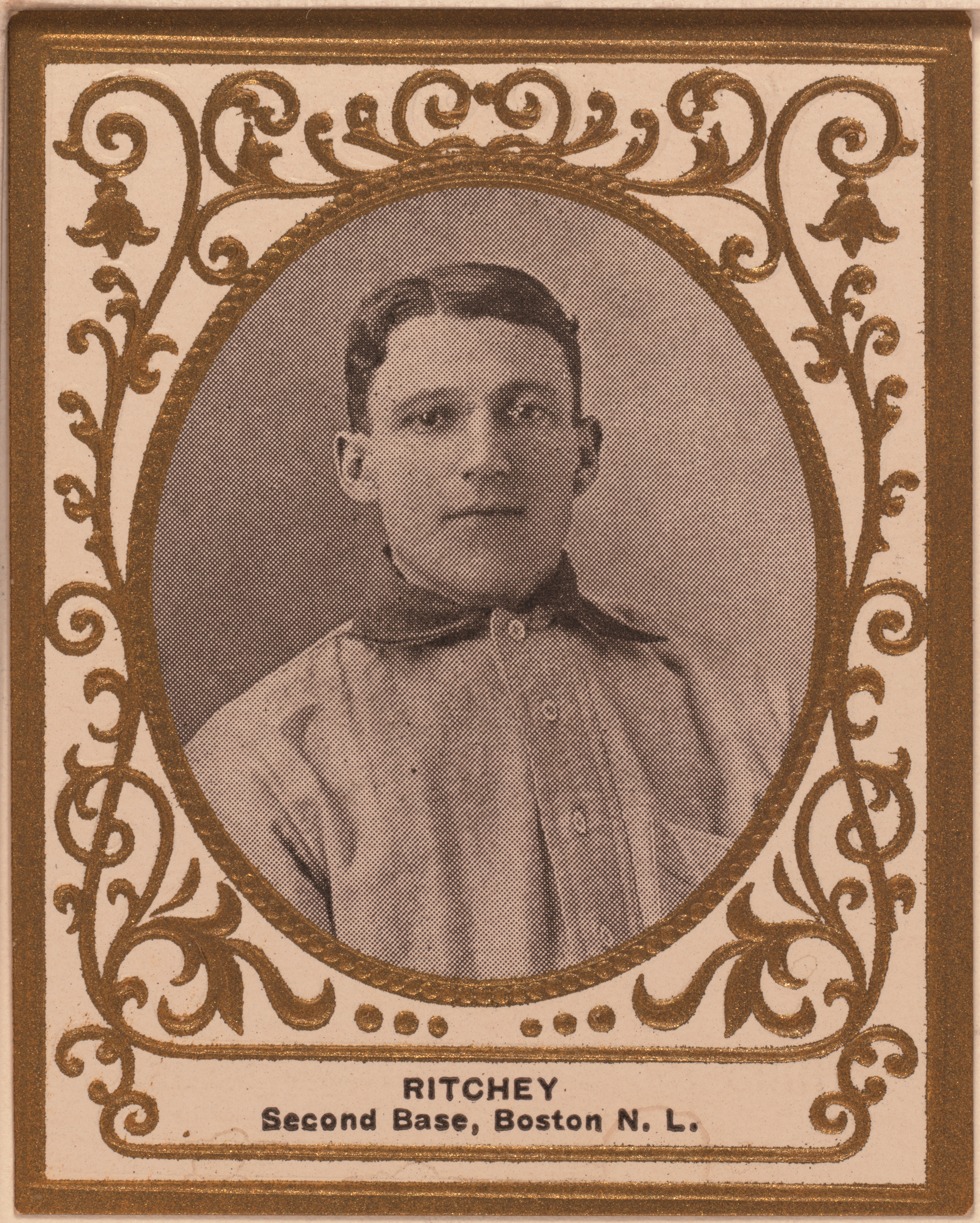
- Second baseman
- Born: October 5, 1873; Emlenton, Pennsylvania, U.S.
- Died: November 8, 1951 (aged 78); Emlenton, Pennsylvania, U.S.
- Batted: Both Threw: Right

MLB debut
- April 22, 1897, for the Cincinnati Reds

Last MLB appearance
- June 24, 1909, for the Boston Doves

MLB statistics
- Batting average: .273
- Home runs: 18
- Runs batted in: 675
- Stats at Baseball Reference

Teams
- Cincinnati Reds (1897); Louisville Colonels (1898–1899); Pittsburgh Pirates (1900–1906); Boston Doves (1907–1909)

Claude Cassius Ritchey (October 5, 1873 – November 8, 1951) was an American Major League Baseball player. Nicknamed "Little All Right", he played second base, shortstop, and outfield for the Cincinnati Reds, Pittsburgh Pirates, Boston Doves, and Louisville Colonels from 1897 to 1909.

In the 1903 World Series, his only postseason appearance, he hit only .148 (4-for-27) but handled 49 total chances (20 putouts, 29 assists) without an error and was involved in 5 double plays.

In 1672 games over 13 seasons, Ritchey posted a .273 batting average (1619-for-5923) with 709 runs, 216 doubles, 68 triples, 18 home runs, 675 RBI, 155 stolen bases, and 607 base on balls. He finished his career with a .952 fielding percentage.

== See also ==
- List of Major League Baseball career stolen bases leaders
