= 1897 Washington Senators season =

1897 Washington Senators
- League: National League
- Ballpark: Boundary Field
- City: Washington, D.C.
- Record: 61–71 (.462)
- League place: T–6th
- Owners: J. Earl Wagner
- Managers: Gus Schmelz, Tom Brown

The 1897 Washington Senators baseball team finished the season with a 61–71 record, tied for sixth place in the National League. The Senators (also known as the Nationals) finished in the first division in the only time in the franchise's nine-year run in the National League. After getting off to a dismal 31–55 start, Washington won 30 of its last 46 games. Their overall winning percentage (.462) would be the high-water mark for this franchise before it folded in contraction at the conclusion of the 1899 season.

== Regular season ==
=== Season standings ===
National League
Team	W	L	Pct.	GB	Home	Road
Boston Beaneaters	93	39	.705	—	54‍–‍12	39‍–‍27
Baltimore Orioles	90	40	.692	2	51‍–‍15	39‍–‍25
New York Giants	83	48	.634	9½	51‍–‍19	32‍–‍29
Cincinnati Reds	76	56	.576	17	49‍–‍18	27‍–‍38
Cleveland Spiders	69	62	.527	23½	49‍–‍16	20‍–‍46
Washington Senators	61	71	.462	32	40‍–‍26	21‍–‍45
Brooklyn Bridegrooms	61	71	.462	32	38‍–‍29	23‍–‍42
Pittsburgh Pirates	60	71	.458	32½	38‍–‍27	22‍–‍44
Chicago Colts	59	73	.447	34	36‍–‍30	23‍–‍43
Philadelphia Phillies	55	77	.417	38	32‍–‍34	23‍–‍43
Louisville Colonels	52	78	.400	40	34‍–‍31	18‍–‍47
St. Louis Browns	29	102	.221	63½	18‍–‍41	11‍–‍61

=== Record vs. opponents ===
1897 National League record Sources:
Team	BAL	BSN	BRO	CHI	CIN	CLE	LOU	NYG	PHI	PIT	STL	WAS
Baltimore	—	6–6	9–3–2	9–3–3	6–6	7–4	10–1	5–7	10–2–1	9–3	10–2	9–3
Boston	6–6	—	9–3	8–4–1	9–3	7–5	9–3	8–4	10–2–1	10–2	10–2	7–5–1
Brooklyn	3–9–2	3–9	—	6–6	7–5	7–5	5–7	3–9–2	6–6	7–5	7–5	7–5
Chicago	3–9–3	4–8–1	6–6	—	5–7	4–8	6–6–1	5–7–1	5–7	6–6	8–4	7–5
Cincinnati	6–6	3–9	5–7	7–5	—	7–5	9–3	7–5–1	8–4	5–7–1	11–1	8–4
Cleveland	4–7	5–7	5–7	8–4	5–7	—	5–7	3–9	9–3	6–6	11–1–1	8–4
Louisville	1–10	3–9	7–5	6–6–1	3–9	7–5	—	6–6–1	3–9	4–8–2	8–3–1	4–8–1
New York	7–5	4–8	9–3–2	7–5–1	5–7–1	9–3	6–6–1	—	7–5	8–3–1	12–0	9–3–1
Philadelphia	2–10–1	2–10–1	6–6	7–5	4–8	3–9	9–3	5–7	—	5–7	8–4	4–8
Pittsburgh	3–9	2–10	5–7	6–6	7–5–1	6–6	8–4–2	3–8–1	7–5	—	8–4	5–7
St. Louis	2–10	2–10	5–7	4–8	1–11	1–11–1	3–8–1	0–12	4–8	4–8	—	3–9
Washington	3–9	5–7–1	5–7	5–7	4–8	4–8	8–4–1	3–9–1	8–4	7–5	9–3	—

=== Roster ===
1897 Washington Senators
Roster
Pitchers: Roger Bresnahan; Les German; Silver King; Al Maul; Doc McJames; Win Mercer; Effie Norton; Joe Stanley; Cy Swaim	Catchers: Duke Farrell; Deacon McGuire; Infielders: Ed Cartwright; Gene DeMontreville; Bill Fox; John O'Brien; Charlie Reilly; Tommy Tucker	Outfielders: Charlie Abbey; Tom Brown; Jake Gettman; Tom Leahy; Billy Lush; Kip Selbach; Zeke Wrigley	Manager: Tom Brown; Gus Schmelz

== Player stats ==
=== Batting ===
==== Starters by position ====
Note: Pos = Position; G = Games played; AB = At bats; H = Hits; Avg. = Batting average; HR = Home runs; RBI = Runs batted in

Pos	Player	G	AB	H	Avg.	HR	RBI
C	Deacon McGuire	93	327	112	.343	4	53
1B	Tommy Tucker	93	352	119	.338	5	61
2B	John O'Brien	86	320	78	.244	3	45
SS	Gene DeMontreville	133	566	193	.341	3	93
3B	Charlie Reilly	101	351	97	.276	2	60
OF	Kip Selbach	124	486	152	.313	5	59
OF	Tom Brown	116	469	137	.292	5	45
OF	Charlie Abbey	80	300	78	.260	3	34

==== Other batters ====
Note: G = Games played; AB = At bats; H = Hits; Avg. = Batting average; HR = Home runs; RBI = Runs batted in

Player	G	AB	H	Avg.	HR	RBI
Zeke Wrigley	104	388	110	.284	3	64
Duke Farrell	78	261	84	.322	0	53
Jake Gettman	36	143	45	.315	3	29
Ed Cartwright	33	124	29	.234	0	15
Tom Leahy	19	52	20	.385	0	7
Effie Norton	7	18	5	.278	0	2
Bill Fox	4	14	4	.286	0	0
Billy Lush	3	12	0	.000	0	0

=== Pitching ===
==== Starting pitchers ====
Note: G = Games pitched; IP = Innings pitched; W = Wins; L = Losses; ERA = Earned run average; SO = Strikeouts

Player	G	IP	W	L	ERA	SO
Win Mercer	47	342.0	21	20	3.18	91
Doc McJames	44	323.2	15	23	3.61	156
Cy Swaim	26	184.0	9	11	4.60	52
Silver King	23	154.0	6	9	4.79	32
Roger Bresnahan	6	41.0	4	0	3.95	12
Al Maul	1	2.0	0	1	9.00	0

==== Other pitchers ====
Note: G = Games pitched; IP = Innings pitched; W = Wins; L = Losses; ERA = Earned run average; SO = Strikeouts

Player	G	IP	W	L	ERA	SO
Les German	15	83.2	3	5	5.59	2
Effie Norton	4	17.0	2	1	6.88	3

==== Relief pitchers ====
Note: G = Games pitched; W = Wins; L = Losses; SV = Saves; ERA = Earned run average; SO = Strikeouts

Player	G	W	L	SV	ERA	SO
Joe Stanley	1	0	0	0	0.00	0
