= 1897 Baltimore Orioles season =

1897 Baltimore Orioles
- Temple Cup Champions
- League: National League
- Ballpark: Union Park
- City: Baltimore, Maryland
- Record: 90–40 (.692)
- League place: 2nd
- Owners: Harry Von der Horst
- Managers: Ned Hanlon

The 1897 Baltimore Orioles season was a season in American baseball. After three straight first-place finishes, the Orioles slipped to second place with a record of 90–40, 2 games behind the National League-leading Boston Beaneaters. After the season, the two teams met in what would be the final Temple Cup competition, with the Orioles winning 4 games to 1. In all, Baltimore played in all four Temple Cups, losing the first two and winning the last two.

== Regular season ==
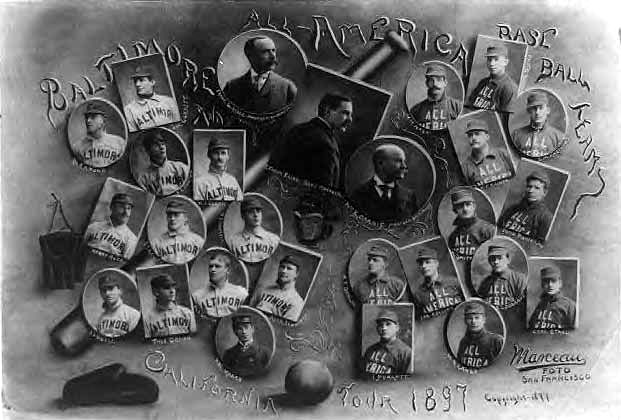
The 1897 Baltimore Orioles

=== Season standings ===
National League
Team	W	L	Pct.	GB	Home	Road
Boston Beaneaters	93	39	.705	—	54‍–‍12	39‍–‍27
Baltimore Orioles	90	40	.692	2	51‍–‍15	39‍–‍25
New York Giants	83	48	.634	9½	51‍–‍19	32‍–‍29
Cincinnati Reds	76	56	.576	17	49‍–‍18	27‍–‍38
Cleveland Spiders	69	62	.527	23½	49‍–‍16	20‍–‍46
Washington Senators	61	71	.462	32	40‍–‍26	21‍–‍45
Brooklyn Bridegrooms	61	71	.462	32	38‍–‍29	23‍–‍42
Pittsburgh Pirates	60	71	.458	32½	38‍–‍27	22‍–‍44
Chicago Colts	59	73	.447	34	36‍–‍30	23‍–‍43
Philadelphia Phillies	55	77	.417	38	32‍–‍34	23‍–‍43
Louisville Colonels	52	78	.400	40	34‍–‍31	18‍–‍47
St. Louis Browns	29	102	.221	63½	18‍–‍41	11‍–‍61

=== Record vs. opponents ===
1897 National League record Sources:
Team	BAL	BSN	BRO	CHI	CIN	CLE	LOU	NYG	PHI	PIT	STL	WAS
Baltimore	—	6–6	9–3–2	9–3–3	6–6	7–4	10–1	5–7	10–2–1	9–3	10–2	9–3
Boston	6–6	—	9–3	8–4–1	9–3	7–5	9–3	8–4	10–2–1	10–2	10–2	7–5–1
Brooklyn	3–9–2	3–9	—	6–6	7–5	7–5	5–7	3–9–2	6–6	7–5	7–5	7–5
Chicago	3–9–3	4–8–1	6–6	—	5–7	4–8	6–6–1	5–7–1	5–7	6–6	8–4	7–5
Cincinnati	6–6	3–9	5–7	7–5	—	7–5	9–3	7–5–1	8–4	5–7–1	11–1	8–4
Cleveland	4–7	5–7	5–7	8–4	5–7	—	5–7	3–9	9–3	6–6	11–1–1	8–4
Louisville	1–10	3–9	7–5	6–6–1	3–9	7–5	—	6–6–1	3–9	4–8–2	8–3–1	4–8–1
New York	7–5	4–8	9–3–2	7–5–1	5–7–1	9–3	6–6–1	—	7–5	8–3–1	12–0	9–3–1
Philadelphia	2–10–1	2–10–1	6–6	7–5	4–8	3–9	9–3	5–7	—	5–7	8–4	4–8
Pittsburgh	3–9	2–10	5–7	6–6	7–5–1	6–6	8–4–2	3–8–1	7–5	—	8–4	5–7
St. Louis	2–10	2–10	5–7	4–8	1–11	1–11–1	3–8–1	0–12	4–8	4–8	—	3–9
Washington	3–9	5–7–1	5–7	5–7	4–8	4–8	8–4–1	3–9–1	8–4	7–5	9–3	—

=== Roster ===
1897 Baltimore Orioles
Roster
Pitchers: Doc Amole; George Blackburn; Dick Cogan; Joe Corbett; Bill Hoffer; Al Maul; Jerry Nops; Arlie Pond	Catchers: Frank Bowerman; Boileryard Clarke; Wilbert Robinson; Infielders: Jack Doyle; Hughie Jennings; John McGraw; Tom O'Brien; Joe Quinn; Heinie Reitz	Outfielders: Willie Keeler; Joe Kelley; Jake Stenzel	Manager: Ned Hanlon

== Player stats ==
=== Batting ===
==== Starters by position ====
Note: Pos = Position; G = Games played; AB = At bats; H = Hits; Avg. = Batting average; HR = Home runs; RBI = Runs batted in

Pos	Player	G	AB	H	Avg.	HR	RBI
C	Boileryard Clarke	64	241	65	.270	1	38
1B	Jack Doyle	114	460	163	.354	2	87
2B	Heinie Reitz	128	477	138	.289	2	84
SS	Hughie Jennings	117	439	156	.355	2	79
3B	John McGraw	106	391	127	.325	0	48
OF	Willie Keeler	129	564	239	.424	0	74
OF	Joe Kelley	131	505	183	.362	5	118
OF	Jake Stenzel	131	536	189	.353	4	116

==== Other batters ====
Note: G = Games played; AB = At bats; H = Hits; Avg. = Batting average; HR = Home runs; RBI = Runs batted in

Player	G	AB	H	Avg.	HR	RBI
Joe Quinn	75	285	74	.260	1	45
Wilbert Robinson	48	181	57	.315	0	23
Tom O'Brien	50	147	37	.252	0	32
Frank Bowerman	38	130	41	.315	1	21

=== Pitching ===
==== Starting pitchers ====
Note: G = Games pitched; IP = Innings pitched; W = Wins; L = Losses; ERA = Earned run average; SO = Strikeouts

Player	G	IP	W	L	ERA	SO
Joe Corbett	37	313.0	24	8	3.11	149
Bill Hoffer	38	303.1	22	11	4.30	62
Arlie Pond	32	248.0	18	9	3.52	59
Jerry Nops	30	220.2	20	6	2.81	69
George Blackburn	5	33.0	2	2	6.82	1
Al Maul	2	7.2	0	0	7.04	2

==== Other pitchers ====
Note: G = Games pitched; IP = Innings pitched; W = Wins; L = Losses; ERA = Earned run average; SO = Strikeouts

Player	G	IP	W	L	ERA	SO
Doc Amole	11	70.0	4	4	2.57	19

==== Relief pitchers ====
Note: G = Games pitched; W = Wins; L = Losses; SV = Saves; ERA = Earned run average; SO = Strikeouts

Player	G	W	L	SV	ERA	SO
Dick Cogan	1	0	0	0	13.50	0
