= Ira Belden =

American baseball player (1874–1916)

- Outfielder
- Born: April 16, 1874; Cleveland, Ohio, U.S.
- Died: July 15, 1916 (aged 42); Lakewood, Ohio, U.S.
- Batted: Left Threw: Right

MLB debut
- September 17, 1897, for the Cleveland Spiders

Last MLB appearance
- September 25, 1897, for the Cleveland Spiders

MLB statistics
- Batting average: .267
- Home runs: 0
- Runs batted in: 4
- Stats at Baseball Reference

Teams
- Cleveland Spiders (1897)

Ira Allison Belden (April 16, 1874 – July 15, 1916) was an American outfielder in Major League Baseball who played in the late 19th century.
