= Pat Murray (baseball) =

American baseball player (1897-1983)

- Pitcher
- Born: July 18, 1897; Scottsville, New York
- Died: November 5, 1983 (aged 86); Rochester, New York
- Batted: Right Threw: Left

MLB debut
- July 1, 1919, for the Philadelphia Phillies

Last MLB appearance
- August 22, 1919, for the Philadelphia Phillies

MLB statistics
- Innings pitched: 34 1/3
- Win–loss record: 0–2
- Earned run average: 6.29
- Strikeouts: 11

Teams
- Philadelphia Phillies (1919)

Patrick Joseph Murray (July 18, 1897 – November 5, 1983) was a Major League Baseball pitcher for the 1919 Philadelphia Phillies.

Murray made his major league debut at age 21. His final appearance came less than two months later. Overall, he made two starts and ended up with an 0–2 record with one complete game. He went hitless in 12 at-bats. He attended the University of Notre Dame.
