= Bob Becker (baseball) =

American baseball player (1875–1951)

- Pitcher
- Born: August 15, 1875; Syracuse, New York, U.S.
- Died: October 11, 1951 (aged 76); Syracuse, New York, U.S.
- Batted: Unknown Threw: Left

MLB debut
- September 6, 1897, for the Philadelphia Phillies

Last MLB appearance
- May 17, 1898, for the Philadelphia Phillies

MLB statistics
- Win–loss record: 0–2
- Earned run average: 6.52
- Strikeouts: 10
- Stats at Baseball Reference

Teams
- Philadelphia Phillies (1897–1898)

Robert Charles Becker (August 15, 1875 – October 11, 1951) was an American Major League Baseball (MLB) pitcher who played for two seasons. He pitched for the Philadelphia Phillies from 1897 to 1898, playing in six career games.
