= Howie Jones (baseball) =

American baseball player (1897–1972)

- Howie Jones
- Pinch hitter / Left fielder
- Born: March 1, 1897; Irwin, Pennsylvania
- Died: July 15, 1972 (aged 75); Jeannette, Pennsylvania
- Batted: Left Threw: Left

MLB debut
- September 5, 1921, for the St. Louis Cardinals

Last MLB appearance
- September 17, 1921, for the St. Louis Cardinals

MLB statistics
- Batting average: .000
- Plate appearances: 2
- Strikeouts: 1
- Games played: 3
- Stats at Baseball Reference

Teams
- St. Louis Cardinals (1921)

Howie "Cotton" Jones (March 1, 1897 – July 15, 1972) was an American pinch hitter and left fielder who played for the St. Louis Cardinals in 1921.

== Early life ==
Jones was born on March 1, 1897, in Irwin, Pennsylvania.

== Professional career ==
=== Minor league ===
Jones began his professional career in 1920 for the Moline Plowboys who played in the Illinois–Indiana–Iowa League (IIIL). In that year, he played outfield in 78 games and batted .293—his lowest in his minor league career. The following year, he continued with the Plowboys, and Jones continued to improve. He played 105 games in the outfield and batted .319.

=== 1921 St. Louis Cardinals ===
On September 5, 1921, Howie Jones got his chance to play in Major League Baseball; he was called up to play for the St. Louis Cardinals against the Chicago Cubs. He came in as a pinch hitter for pitcher Bill Pertica in the sixth inning. In his sole plate appearance that game, he was struck out by Buck Freeman, but the Cardinals won 4 to 3. Jones' next game was four days later against the Cincinnati Reds. Once again, as a pinch hitter, Jones did not achieve a hit. Howie's last Major League game came on September 17, 1921, against the Philadelphia Phillies. He replaced Austin McHenry and played left field until being replaced by Cliff Heathcote.

=== Back to the minors ===
The following year, Jones played for the AA-affiliated Syracuse Stars. He played in a team-high 159 games in the outfield and batted .294. For his final three years in his baseball career, he played for the Binghamton Triplets from 1923 to 1926. In each of these three seasons, Jones batted over .325; in two of three he played in over 110 games.

== Post-baseball career ==
Howie Jones died on July 15, 1972, in Jeannette, Pennsylvania, at the age of 75. He is buried at Irwin Union Cemetery in the aforementioned city.
