= Tommy Dowd (baseball) =

American baseball player (1869–1933)

- Outfielder / Second baseman
- Born: April 20, 1869; Holyoke, Massachusetts, U.S.
- Died: July 2, 1933 (aged 64); Holyoke, Massachusetts, U.S.
- Batted: Right Threw: Right

MLB debut
- April 8, 1891, for the Boston Reds

Last MLB appearance
- September 28, 1901, for the Boston Americans

MLB statistics
- Batting average: .271
- Home runs: 24
- Runs batted in: 501
- Stolen bases: 368
- Stats at Baseball Reference

Teams
- As player: Boston Reds (1891); Washington Statesmen/Senators (1891–1892); St. Louis Browns (1893–1897); Philadelphia Phillies (1897); St. Louis Browns (1898); Cleveland Spiders (1899); Boston Americans (1901); As manager: St. Louis Browns (1896–1897)

Thomas Jefferson Dowd (April 20, 1869 – July 2, 1933), nicknamed "Buttermilk Tommy", was an American Major League Baseball outfielder and second baseman from Holyoke, Massachusetts, who played for six teams during his ten-season career.

== College ==
Dowd played college baseball at Brown University, and according to an article in the Brown Alumni Magazine:

Nineteenth-century baseball authority Tim Murnane of the Boston Globe proclaimed Dowd the best center fielder he'd ever seen, especially for his skill at sprinting back on a ball over his head and then turning left or right for the catch. For years Dowd held the unofficial record time for circling the bases.

== Major Leagues ==
Dowd made his major-league debut on April 8, 1891 for the Boston Reds of the American Association. He later played with the Washington Senators, St. Louis Browns, Philadelphia Phillies and Cleveland Spiders in the National League and the Boston Americans in the American League. He was a right-handed batter with a career batting average of .271, and stole 366 bases in his major league career. His final game was September 28, 1901. Dowd has the distinction of being the first Massachusetts native to play for the Americans, as well as the first official player, as he was the leadoff hitter in their first game, a road game in Baltimore.

During the 1891 and 1892 off-seasons, Dowd was the head football coach at Georgetown University.

== Coaching career ==
After his career, he coached at Amherst College and Williams College, and managed in several minor and independent leagues. In 1908 he was managing at Hartford, and signed Chick Evans to a contract. Dowd also studied law at Georgetown University. He was given credit for discovering Rabbit Maranville.

In 1905, Dowd coached the football team at St. Louis University, leading the Blue and White to a 7–2 record.

Dowd died at the age of 64 in his hometown of Holyoke of accidental drowning. His body was found in the Connecticut River. He is interred at the Calvary Cemetery.

== Head coaching record ==
=== College football ===
Year	Team	Overall	Conference	Standing	Bowl/playoffs
Georgetown (Independent) (1891–1892)
1891	Georgetown	2–2			
1892	Georgetown	4–2–1			
Georgetown:		6–4–1			
Saint Louis Blue and White (Independent) (1905)
1905	Saint Louis	7–2			
Saint Louis:		7–2			
Total:		13–6–1			

== See also ==
- List of Major League Baseball career stolen bases leaders
- List of Major League Baseball players to hit for the cycle
- List of Major League Baseball player-managers
- List of St. Louis Cardinals team records

Achievements
Preceded by Tom Parrott	Hitting for the cycle August 16, 1895	Succeeded by Ed Cartwright
