= 1893 Chicago Colts season =

1893 Chicago Colts
- League: National League
- Ballpark: South Side Park (since 1891); West Side Park
- City: Chicago
- Record: 56–71 (.441)
- League place: 9th
- Owners: Albert Spalding
- Managers: Cap Anson

The 1893 Chicago Colts season was the 22nd season of the Chicago Colts franchise, the 18th in the National League and the first at West Side Park. The Colts finished ninth in the National League with a record of 56–71.

== Regular season ==
=== Season standings ===
National League
Team	W	L	Pct.	GB	Home	Road
Boston Beaneaters	86	43	.667	—	49‍–‍15	37‍–‍28
Pittsburgh Pirates	81	48	.628	5	54‍–‍19	27‍–‍29
Cleveland Spiders	73	55	.570	12½	47‍–‍22	26‍–‍33
Philadelphia Phillies	72	57	.558	14	43‍–‍22	29‍–‍35
New York Giants	68	64	.515	19½	49‍–‍20	19‍–‍44
Cincinnati Reds	65	63	.508	20½	37‍–‍27	28‍–‍36
Brooklyn Grooms	65	63	.508	20½	43‍–‍24	22‍–‍39
Baltimore Orioles	60	70	.462	26½	36‍–‍24	24‍–‍46
Chicago Colts	56	71	.441	29	38‍–‍34	18‍–‍37
St. Louis Browns	57	75	.432	30½	40‍–‍30	17‍–‍45
Louisville Colonels	50	75	.400	34	24‍–‍28	26‍–‍47
Washington Senators	40	89	.310	46	21‍–‍27	19‍–‍62

=== Record vs. opponents ===
1893 National League record Sources:
Team	BAL	BSN	BRO	CHI	CIN	CLE	LOU	NYG	PHI	PIT	STL	WAS
Baltimore	—	2–10	10–2	5–7	4–8	8–4	5–5	4–8	5–7	1–11	9–3	7–5
Boston	10–2	—	8–4	8–3–1	6–6	7–5	10–2	8–4	8–4	4–6–1	10–2	7–5
Brooklyn	2–10	4–8	—	7–3	4–8	5–7–1	7–5	6–6	6–5–1	8–4	8–4	8–3
Chicago	7–5	3–8–1	3–7	—	5–7	4–8	6–4	7–5	6–6	3–9	3–9	9–3
Cincinnati	8–4	6–6	8–4	7–5	—	6–5	6–6	6–6–1	1–9–1	3–9	7–5–1	7–4
Cleveland	4–8	5–7	7–5–1	8–4	5–6	—	6–3	6–6	3–9	9–3	9–3	11–1
Louisville	5–5	2–10	5–7	4–6	6–6	3–6	—	5–7–1	4–8	4–8	4–8	8–4
New York	8–4	4–8	6–6	5–7	6–6–1	6–6	7–5–1	—	7–5–1	4–8–1	8–4	7–5
Philadelphia	7–5	4–8	5–6–1	6–6	9–1–1	9–3	8–4	5–7–1	—	7–5	4–8–1	8–4
Pittsburgh	11–1	6–4–1	4–8	9–3	9–3	3–9	8–4	8–4–1	5–7	—	9–3	9–2
St. Louis	3–9	2–10	4–8	9–3	5–7–1	3–9	8–4	4–8	8–4–1	3–9	—	8–4–1
Washington	5–7	5–7	3–8	3–9	4–7	1–11	4–8	5–7	4–8	2–9	4–8–1	—

== Roster ==
1893 Chicago Colts
Roster
Pitchers: Bert Abbey; Fritz Clausen; Frank Donnelly; Clark Griffith; Jim Hughey; Bill Hutchison; Abe Johnson; Hal Mauck; Willie McGill; Gus McGinnis; Doc Parker; Tom Parrott; Sam Shaw; Gus Yost	Catchers: Malachi Kittridge; Pop Schriver; Infielders: Cap Anson; Lew Camp; Bill Dahlen; Bill Eagan; Bob Glenalvin; Charlie Irwin; Bill Lange; John O'Brien; Jiggs Parrott	Outfielders: Bob Caruthers; George Decker; Sam Dungan; Henry Lynch; Jimmy Ryan; Walt Wilmot	Manager: Cap Anson

== Player stats ==
=== Batting ===
==== Starters by position ====
Note: Pos = Position; G = Games played; AB = At bats; H = Hits; Avg. = Batting average; HR = Home runs; RBI = Runs batted in

Pos	Player	G	AB	H	Avg.	HR	RBI
C	Malachi Kittridge	70	255	59	.231	2	30
1B	Cap Anson	103	398	125	.314	0	91
2B	Bill Lange	117	469	132	.281	8	88
SS	Bill Dahlen	116	485	146	.301	5	64
3B	Jiggs Parrott	113	468	113	.241	1	65
OF	Walt Wilmot	94	392	118	.301	3	61
OF	Jimmy Ryan	83	341	102	.299	3	30
OF	Sam Dungan	107	465	138	.297	2	64

==== Other batters ====
Note: G = Games played; AB = At bats; H = Hits; Avg. = Batting average; HR = Home runs; RBI = Runs batted in

Player	G	AB	H	Avg.	HR	RBI
George Decker	81	328	89	.271	2	48
Pop Schriver	64	229	65	.284	4	34
Lew Camp	38	156	41	.263	2	17
Charlie Irwin	21	82	25	.305	0	13
Bob Glenalvin	16	61	21	.344	0	12
Bill Eagan	6	19	5	.263	0	2
John O'Brien	4	14	5	.357	0	1
Henry Lynch	4	14	3	.214	0	2
Bob Caruthers	1	3	0	.000	0	0

=== Pitching ===
==== Starting pitchers ====
Note: G = Games pitched; IP = Innings pitched; W = Wins; L = Losses; ERA = Earned run average; SO = Strikeouts

Player	G	IP	W	L	ERA	SO
Bill Hutchison	44	348.1	16	24	4.75	80
Willie McGill	39	302.2	17	18	4.61	91
Hal Mauck	23	143.0	8	10	4.41	23
Fritz Clausen	10	76.0	6	2	3.08	31
Bert Abbey	7	56.0	2	4	5.46	6
Frank Donnelly	7	42.0	3	1	5.36	6
Tom Parrott	4	27.0	0	3	6.67	7
Sam Shaw	2	16.0	1	0	5.63	1
Jim Hughey	2	9.0	0	1	11.00	4
Gus Yost	1	2.2	0	1	13.50	1

==== Other pitchers ====
Note: G = Games pitched; IP = Innings pitched; W = Wins; L = Losses; ERA = Earned run average; SO = Strikeouts

Player	G	IP	W	L	ERA	SO
Gus McGinnis	13	67.1	2	5	5.35	13
Clark Griffith	4	19.2	1	2	5.03	9

==== Relief pitchers ====
Note: G = Games pitched; W = Wins; L = Losses; SV = Saves; ERA = Earned run average; SO = Strikeouts

Player	G	W	L	SV	ERA	SO
Jimmy Ryan	1	0	0	0	0.00	1
Doc Parker	1	0	0	1	13.50	0
Abe Johnson	1	0	0	1	36.00	0
