= 1893 Cleveland Spiders season =

1893 Cleveland Spiders
- League: National League
- Ballpark: League Park
- City: Cleveland, Ohio
- Record: 73–55 (.570)
- League place: 3rd
- Owners: Frank Robison
- Managers: Patsy Tebeau

The 1893 Cleveland Spiders finished with a 73–55 record and a third-place finish in the National League.

== Regular season ==
=== Season standings ===
National League
Team	W	L	Pct.	GB	Home	Road
Boston Beaneaters	86	43	.667	—	49‍–‍15	37‍–‍28
Pittsburgh Pirates	81	48	.628	5	54‍–‍19	27‍–‍29
Cleveland Spiders	73	55	.570	12½	47‍–‍22	26‍–‍33
Philadelphia Phillies	72	57	.558	14	43‍–‍22	29‍–‍35
New York Giants	68	64	.515	19½	49‍–‍20	19‍–‍44
Cincinnati Reds	65	63	.508	20½	37‍–‍27	28‍–‍36
Brooklyn Grooms	65	63	.508	20½	43‍–‍24	22‍–‍39
Baltimore Orioles	60	70	.462	26½	36‍–‍24	24‍–‍46
Chicago Colts	56	71	.441	29	38‍–‍34	18‍–‍37
St. Louis Browns	57	75	.432	30½	40‍–‍30	17‍–‍45
Louisville Colonels	50	75	.400	34	24‍–‍28	26‍–‍47
Washington Senators	40	89	.310	46	21‍–‍27	19‍–‍62

=== Record vs. opponents ===
1893 National League record Sources:
Team	BAL	BSN	BRO	CHI	CIN	CLE	LOU	NYG	PHI	PIT	STL	WAS
Baltimore	—	2–10	10–2	5–7	4–8	8–4	5–5	4–8	5–7	1–11	9–3	7–5
Boston	10–2	—	8–4	8–3–1	6–6	7–5	10–2	8–4	8–4	4–6–1	10–2	7–5
Brooklyn	2–10	4–8	—	7–3	4–8	5–7–1	7–5	6–6	6–5–1	8–4	8–4	8–3
Chicago	7–5	3–8–1	3–7	—	5–7	4–8	6–4	7–5	6–6	3–9	3–9	9–3
Cincinnati	8–4	6–6	8–4	7–5	—	6–5	6–6	6–6–1	1–9–1	3–9	7–5–1	7–4
Cleveland	4–8	5–7	7–5–1	8–4	5–6	—	6–3	6–6	3–9	9–3	9–3	11–1
Louisville	5–5	2–10	5–7	4–6	6–6	3–6	—	5–7–1	4–8	4–8	4–8	8–4
New York	8–4	4–8	6–6	5–7	6–6–1	6–6	7–5–1	—	7–5–1	4–8–1	8–4	7–5
Philadelphia	7–5	4–8	5–6–1	6–6	9–1–1	9–3	8–4	5–7–1	—	7–5	4–8–1	8–4
Pittsburgh	11–1	6–4–1	4–8	9–3	9–3	3–9	8–4	8–4–1	5–7	—	9–3	9–2
St. Louis	3–9	2–10	4–8	9–3	5–7–1	3–9	8–4	4–8	8–4–1	3–9	—	8–4–1
Washington	5–7	5–7	3–8	3–9	4–7	1–11	4–8	5–7	4–8	2–9	4–8–1	—

=== Roster ===
1893 Cleveland Spiders
Roster
Pitchers: John Clarkson; George Cuppy; George Davies; Chauncey Fisher; Charlie Hastings; Jack Scheible; John Stafford; Tom Williams; Cy Young	Catchers: Pete Allen; Frank Boyd; Joe Gunson; Jack O'Connor; Chief Zimmer; Infielders: Billy Alvord; Cupid Childs; Jim Gilman; Chippy McGarr; Ed McKean; Patsy Tebeau; Jake Virtue	Outfielders: Jesse Burkett; Buck Ewing; Jimmy McAleer; Ed McFarland	Manager: Patsy Tebeau

== Player stats ==
=== Batting ===
==== Starters by position ====
Note: Pos = Position; G = Games played; AB = At bats; H = Hits; Avg. = Batting average; HR = Home runs; RBI = Runs batted in

Pos	Player	G	AB	H	Avg.	HR	RBI
C	Jack O'Connor	96	384	110	.286	4	75
1B	Jake Virtue	97	378	100	.265	1	60
2B	Cupid Childs	124	485	158	.326	3	65
SS	Ed McKean	125	545	169	.310	4	133
3B	Chippy McGarr	63	249	77	.309	0	28
OF	Jimmy McAleer	91	350	83	.237	2	41
OF	Jesse Burkett	125	511	178	.348	6	82
OF	Buck Ewing	116	500	172	.344	6	122

==== Other batters ====
Note: G = Games played; AB = At bats; H = Hits; Avg. = Batting average; HR = Home runs; RBI = Runs batted in

Player	G	AB	H	Avg.	HR	RBI
Patsy Tebeau	116	486	160	.329	2	102
Chief Zimmer	57	227	70	.308	2	41
Joe Gunson	21	73	19	.260	0	9
Ed McFarland	8	22	9	.409	0	6
Tom Williams	8	18	5	.278	0	2
Billy Alvord	3	12	2	.167	0	2
Jim Gilman	2	7	2	.286	0	1
Frank Boyd	2	5	1	.200	0	3
Pete Allen	1	4	0	.000	0	0

=== Pitching ===
==== Starting pitchers ====
Note: G = Games pitched; IP = Innings pitched; W = Wins; L = Losses; ERA = Earned run average; SO = Strikeouts

Player	G	IP	W	L	ERA	SO
Cy Young	53	422.2	33	16	3.36	102
John Clarkson	36	295.0	16	17	4.45	62
George Cuppy	31	243.2	18	10	4.47	39
Jack Scheible	2	18.0	1	1	2.00	1
Chauncey Fisher	2	18.0	0	2	5.50	9
George Davies	3	15.0	0	2	11.40	3

==== Other pitchers ====
Note: G = Games pitched; IP = Innings pitched; W = Wins; L = Losses; ERA = Earned run average; SO = Strikeouts

Player	G	IP	W	L	ERA	SO
Charlie Hastings	15	92.0	4	5	4.70	14
Tom Williams	5	24.0	1	1	4.88	6

==== Relief pitchers ====
Note: G = Games pitched; W = Wins; L = Losses; SV = Saves; ERA = Earned run average; SO = Strikeouts

Player	G	W	L	SV	ERA	SO
John Stafford	2	0	1	0	14.14	4
Jake Virtue	1	0	0	0	1.80	2
