= 1893 Cincinnati Reds season =

1893 Cincinnati Reds
- League: National League
- Ballpark: League Park
- City: Cincinnati
- Record: 65–63 (.508)
- League place: 6th
- Owners: John T. Brush
- Managers: Charlie Comiskey

The 1893 Cincinnati Reds season was a season in American baseball. The team finished tied for sixth place in the National League with a record of 65–63, 20.5 games behind the Boston Beaneaters.

== Regular season ==
Cincinnati was looking to build on a solid 1892 season in which the team had improved from a record of 56–81 in 1891 to 82–68. First baseman Charles Comiskey returned as player-manager, while the Reds would have a new outfielder, as Jim Canavan joined Cincinnati after spending the previous season with the Chicago Colts. Canavan had struggled offensively with Chicago, hitting only .166 with no homers and 32 RBI in 118 games in 1892.

Catcher Farmer Vaughn had a career season, as he hit .280 with one home run and a team high 108 RBI. Bug Holliday led the Reds with a .310 batting average and 89 RBI, as well as a team high 108 runs scored, while his five home runs tied with Canavan for the team lead. Bid McPhee had a solid season, batting .281 with three home runs and 68 RBI. Arlie Latham hit .282 with two home runs, 49 RBI and a team best 57 stolen bases.

Frank Dwyer was the ace of the pitching staff, as he led the club with an 18–15 record in a team high 37 games, which included 30 starts, with 28 complete games. Ice Box Chamberlain was 16–12 with a team low 3.73 ERA.

=== Season summary ===
The Reds got off to a solid start, sitting in first place with a 6–3 record after nine games. However, the team would win only ten of their next twenty-nine ball games to fall into tenth place in the National League with a 16–22 record. Cincinnati would be under the .500 mark for a majority of the season, however, the Reds would win ten of their final eleven games to avoid finishing with a losing record, as they ended the season with a 65–63 record, tying the Brooklyn Grooms, 20.5 games behind the pennant-winning Boston Beaneaters.

=== Season standings ===
National League
Team	W	L	Pct.	GB	Home	Road
Boston Beaneaters	86	43	.667	—	49‍–‍15	37‍–‍28
Pittsburgh Pirates	81	48	.628	5	54‍–‍19	27‍–‍29
Cleveland Spiders	73	55	.570	12½	47‍–‍22	26‍–‍33
Philadelphia Phillies	72	57	.558	14	43‍–‍22	29‍–‍35
New York Giants	68	64	.515	19½	49‍–‍20	19‍–‍44
Cincinnati Reds	65	63	.508	20½	37‍–‍27	28‍–‍36
Brooklyn Grooms	65	63	.508	20½	43‍–‍24	22‍–‍39
Baltimore Orioles	60	70	.462	26½	36‍–‍24	24‍–‍46
Chicago Colts	56	71	.441	29	38‍–‍34	18‍–‍37
St. Louis Browns	57	75	.432	30½	40‍–‍30	17‍–‍45
Louisville Colonels	50	75	.400	34	24‍–‍28	26‍–‍47
Washington Senators	40	89	.310	46	21‍–‍27	19‍–‍62

=== Record vs. opponents ===
1893 National League record Sources:
Team	BAL	BSN	BRO	CHI	CIN	CLE	LOU	NYG	PHI	PIT	STL	WAS
Baltimore	—	2–10	10–2	5–7	4–8	8–4	5–5	4–8	5–7	1–11	9–3	7–5
Boston	10–2	—	8–4	8–3–1	6–6	7–5	10–2	8–4	8–4	4–6–1	10–2	7–5
Brooklyn	2–10	4–8	—	7–3	4–8	5–7–1	7–5	6–6	6–5–1	8–4	8–4	8–3
Chicago	7–5	3–8–1	3–7	—	5–7	4–8	6–4	7–5	6–6	3–9	3–9	9–3
Cincinnati	8–4	6–6	8–4	7–5	—	6–5	6–6	6–6–1	1–9–1	3–9	7–5–1	7–4
Cleveland	4–8	5–7	7–5–1	8–4	5–6	—	6–3	6–6	3–9	9–3	9–3	11–1
Louisville	5–5	2–10	5–7	4–6	6–6	3–6	—	5–7–1	4–8	4–8	4–8	8–4
New York	8–4	4–8	6–6	5–7	6–6–1	6–6	7–5–1	—	7–5–1	4–8–1	8–4	7–5
Philadelphia	7–5	4–8	5–6–1	6–6	9–1–1	9–3	8–4	5–7–1	—	7–5	4–8–1	8–4
Pittsburgh	11–1	6–4–1	4–8	9–3	9–3	3–9	8–4	8–4–1	5–7	—	9–3	9–2
St. Louis	3–9	2–10	4–8	9–3	5–7–1	3–9	8–4	4–8	8–4–1	3–9	—	8–4–1
Washington	5–7	5–7	3–8	3–9	4–7	1–11	4–8	5–7	4–8	2–9	4–8–1	—

=== Game log ===
Legend
Reds Win	Reds Loss	Game Tied/Postponed

1893 Game Log: 65–63 (Home: 37–27; Away: 28–36)
April/May: 14–16 (Home: 6–7; Away: 8–9)

#	Date	Opponent	Score	Stadium	Attendance	Record	Streak
1	April 27	Colts	10–1	League Park	7,006	1-0	W1
2	April 28	Colts	1–11	League Park	2,000	1-1	L1
3	April 29	Colts	5–0	League Park	1,873	2-1	W1
4	April 30	Colts	1–7	League Park	4,823	2-2	L1
5	May 2	Spiders	2–3	League Park	2,137	2-3	L2
6	May 3	Spiders	17–12	League Park	1,960	3-3	W1
7	May 5	Browns	3–2	League Park	2,261	4-3	W2
8	May 6	Browns	3–1	League Park	3,600	5-3	W3
-	May 7	@ Colonels	Postponed (unknown reason; site change); Makeup: May 7				
9	May 7	Colonels	16–7	League Park	12,360	6-3	W4
10	May 8	Pirates	8–9	League Park	2,707	6-4	L1
11	May 9	Pirates	4–6	League Park	1,820	6-5	L2
12	May 10	Pirates	3–5	League Park	2,350	6-6	L3
-	May 11	@ Colts	Postponed (unknown reason; site change); Makeup: April 28				
13	May 13	@ Colts	10–8	South Side Park	2,500	7-6	W1
14	May 14	@ Colts	13–12	West Side Park	3,500	8-6	W2
15	May 15	@ Browns	6–10	New Sportsman's Park	2,500	8-7	L1
16	May 16	@ Browns	9–6	New Sportsman's Park	2,500	9-7	W1
17	May 17	@ Browns	3–1	New Sportsman's Park	N/A	10-7	W2
18	May 18	@ Spiders	4–21	League Park	2,794	10-8	L1
19	May 19	@ Spiders	5–19	League Park	2,900	10-9	L2
20	May 20	@ Spiders	8–9	League Park	3,200	10-10	L3
21	May 21	Browns	8–9	League Park	9,100	10-11	L4
22	May 22	@ Colonels	1–3	Eclipse Park	2,064	10-12	L5
23	May 23	@ Colonels	8–4	Eclipse Park	1,010	11-12	W1
24	May 25	@ Pirates	1–8	Exposition Park	2,700	11-13	L1
25	May 26	@ Pirates	4–11	Exposition Park	830	11-14	L2
26	May 27	@ Pirates	4–1	Exposition Park	3,300	12-14	W1
27	May 29	@ Giants	0–1	Polo Grounds	3,000	12-15	L1
28	May 30 1	@ Giants	6–8	Polo Grounds	6,000	12-16	L2
29	May 30 2	@ Giants	3–2	Polo Grounds	23,142	13-16	W1
30	May 31	@ Senators	6–5	Boundary Field	2,610	14-16	W2

June: 10–12 (Home: 6–4; Away: 4–8)

#	Date	Opponent	Score	Stadium	Attendance	Record	Streak
31	June 1	@ Senators	6–12	Boundary Field	1,687	14-17	L1
-	June 2	@ Senators	Postponed (rain; site change); Makeup: June 29				
32	June 3	@ Phillies	5–11	Philadelphia Base Ball Grounds	5,769	14-18	L2
33	June 5	@ Phillies	6–8	Philadelphia Base Ball Grounds	2,579	14-19	L3
-	June 6	@ Phillies	Postponed (wet grounds); Makeup: September 2				
34	June 7	@ Beaneaters	9–3	South End Grounds	1,915	15-19	W1
35	June 8	@ Beaneaters	11–9	South End Grounds	2,265	16-19	W2
36	June 9	@ Beaneaters	1–6	South End Grounds	2,654	16-20	L1
37	June 10	@ Grooms	2–4	Eastern Park	7,300	16-21	L2
38	June 12	@ Grooms	13–14	Eastern Park	3,000	16-22	L3
39	June 13	@ Grooms	9–1	Eastern Park	3,100	17-22	W1
40	June 14	@ Orioles	7–6	Union Park	2,372	18-22	W2
41	June 15	@ Orioles	2–8	Union Park	2,377	18-23	L1
42	June 16	@ Orioles	7–19	Union Park	1,616	18-24	L2
43	June 18	Colonels	30–12	League Park	4,850	19-24	W1
44	June 19	Colonels	13–10	League Park	1,302	20-24	W2
45	June 20	Colonels	1–3	League Park	1,162	20-25	L1
46	June 22	Colts	0–3	League Park	1,483	20-26	L2
47	June 24	Colts	4–3	League Park	2,040	21-26	W1
48	June 25	Colts	14–5	League Park	5,609	22-26	W2
49	June 26	Giants	5–5	League Park	2,114	22-26	W2
50	June 27	Giants	13–4	League Park	3,160	23-26	W3
51	June 28	Giants	6–3	League Park	1,630	24-26	W4
52	June 29	Senators	3–5	League Park	1,702	24-27	L1
53	June 30	Senators	5–11	League Park	1,275	24-28	L2

July: 14–14 (Home: 12–10; Away: 2–4)

#	Date	Opponent	Score	Stadium	Attendance	Record	Streak
54	July 1	Senators	5–4	League Park	1,040	25-28	W1
55	July 2	Senators	7–6	League Park	4,728	26-28	W2
56	July 3	Phillies	3–6	League Park	3,107	26-29	L1
57	July 4 1	Phillies	14–15	League Park	7,187	26-30	L2
58	July 4 2	Phillies	5–6	League Park	6,203	26-31	L3
59	July 6	Grooms	9–8	League Park	1,460	27-31	W1
-	July 7	Grooms	Postponed (unknown reason); Makeup: September 25				
60	July 8	Grooms	7–6	League Park	3,021	28-31	W2
61	July 9	Orioles	3–2	League Park	10,699	29-31	W3
62	July 10	Orioles	3–2	League Park	1,821	30-31	W4
63	July 11	Orioles	12–10	League Park	2,831	31-31	W5
64	July 13	Beaneaters	3–5	League Park	3,103	31-32	L1
65	July 14	Beaneaters	6–7	League Park	1,656	31-33	L2
66	July 15	Beaneaters	4–7	League Park	3,125	31-34	L3
67	July 16	Colonels	5–3	League Park	5,258	32-34	W1
68	July 18	Colonels	3–12	League Park	1,278	32-35	L1
69	July 19	Colonels	8–9	League Park	1,122	32-36	L2
70	July 21	@ Browns	10–10	New Sportsman's Park	3,300	32-36	L2
71	July 22	@ Browns	7–9	New Sportsman's Park	5,500	32-37	L3
72	July 23 1	@ Browns	9–4	New Sportsman's Park	N/A	33-37	W1
73	July 23 2	@ Browns	2–3	New Sportsman's Park	20,000	33-38	L1
74	July 24	Spiders	7–3	League Park	1,246	34-38	W1
75	July 25	Spiders	4–3	League Park	1,644	35-38	W2
76	July 26	Spiders	2–0	League Park	3,026	36-38	W3
77	July 27	Pirates	8–3	League Park	5,327	37-38	W4
78	July 28	Pirates	2–7	League Park	N/A	37-39	L1
79	July 29	Pirates	3–9	League Park	2,835	37-40	L2
80	July 30 1	@ Colonels	7–10	Eclipse Park	N/A	37-41	L3
81	July 30 2	@ Colonels	1–2	Eclipse Park	9,678	37-42	L4
82	July 31	@ Colonels	14–7	Eclipse Park	1,073	38-42	W1

August: 13–11 (Home: 2–1; Away: 11–10)

#	Date	Opponent	Score	Stadium	Attendance	Record	Streak
-	August 1	@ Colonels	Postponed (unknown reason); Makeup: July 30				
83	August 3	@ Pirates	5–4	Exposition Park	3,100	39-42	W2
84	August 4	@ Pirates	5–9	Exposition Park	1,500	39-43	L1
85	August 5	@ Pirates	0–8	Exposition Park	4,100	39-44	L2
86	August 6 1	Browns	8–12	League Park	N/A	39-45	L3
87	August 6 2	Browns	3–2	League Park	12,060	40-45	W1
88	August 7	Browns	12–11	League Park	1,809	41-45	W2
-	August 8	Browns	Postponed (unknown reason); Makeup: August 6				
89	August 10	@ Colts	9–7	West Side Park	617	42-45	W3
90	August 12	@ Colts	2–8	West Side Park	2,990	42-46	L1
91	August 13	@ Colts	1–10	West Side Park	10,876	42-47	L2
92	August 14	@ Spiders	5–12	League Park	1,600	42-48	L3
93	August 15	@ Spiders	4–1	League Park	1,800	43-48	W1
94	August 16	@ Spiders	4–1	League Park	500	44-48	W2
95	August 18	@ Grooms	4–8	Eastern Park	2,500	44-49	L1
96	August 19	@ Grooms	4–3	Eastern Park	4,500	45-49	W1
97	August 21	@ Grooms	8–1	Eastern Park	2,000	46-49	W2
98	August 22	@ Beaneaters	4–7	South End Grounds	3,111	46-50	L1
99	August 23	@ Beaneaters	7–8	South End Grounds	2,851	46-51	L2
100	August 24	@ Beaneaters	3–1	South End Grounds	550	47-51	W1
101	August 25	@ Orioles	4–2	Union Park	2,027	48-51	W2
102	August 26	@ Orioles	3–7	Union Park	3,037	48-52	L1
103	August 28	@ Orioles	3–2	Union Park	1,625	49-52	W1
104	August 29	@ Senators	1–8	Boundary Field	1,025	49-53	L1
105	August 30	@ Senators	6–5	Boundary Field	600	50-53	W1
106	August 31	@ Senators	2–1	Boundary Field	923	51-53	W2

September: 14–10 (Home: 12–5; Away: 3–5)

#	Date	Opponent	Score	Stadium	Attendance	Record	Streak
107	September 2 1	@ Phillies	2–6	Philadelphia Base Ball Grounds	1,200	51-54	L1
108	September 2 1	@ Phillies	1–14	Philadelphia Base Ball Grounds	6,985	51-55	L2
109	September 4 1	@ Phillies	10–11	Philadelphia Base Ball Grounds	N/A	51-56	L3
110	September 4 2	@ Phillies	7–1	Philadelphia Base Ball Grounds	6,971	52-56	W1
111	September 6	@ Giants	4–2	Polo Grounds	2,500	53-56	W2
112	September 7	@ Giants	6–4	Polo Grounds	2,500	54-56	W3
-	September 8	@ Giants	Postponed (unknown reason); Makeup: September 7				
113	September 9 1	@ Giants	2–3	Polo Grounds	N/A	54-57	L1
114	September 9 2	@ Giants	1–10	Polo Grounds	9,250	54-58	L2
115	September 11	Phillies	5–6	League Park	989	54-59	L3
116	September 13	Phillies	1–1	League Park	742	54-59	L3
117	September 14	Giants	0–2	League Park	1,536	54-60	L4
118	September 15	Giants	8–7	League Park	N/A	55-60	W1
119	September 16	Giants	7–11	League Park	N/A	55-61	L1
120	September 17	Orioles	5–7	League Park	5,560	55-62	L2
121	September 18	Orioles	7–6	League Park	2,200	56-62	W1
122	September 19	Orioles	7–4	League Park	508	57-62	W2
123	September 21	Beaneaters	7–5	League Park	1,286	58-62	W3
-	September 22	Beaneaters	Postponed (wet grounds); Makeup: September 23				
124	September 23 1	Beaneaters	6–5	League Park	N/A	59-62	W4
125	September 23 2	Beaneaters	6–0	League Park	2,898	60-62	W5
126	September 24	Grooms	3–9	League Park	5,148	60-63	L1
127	September 25	Grooms	11–4	League Park	826	61-63	W1
128	September 26 1	Grooms	7–5	League Park	N/A	62-63	W2
129	September 26 2	Grooms	5–0	League Park	1,980	63-63	W3
-	September 27	Grooms	Postponed (unknown reason); Makeup: September 26				
130	September 28	Senators	8–4	League Park	812	64-63	W4
131	September 29	Senators	10–4	League Park	840	65-63	W5

=== Roster ===
1893 Cincinnati Reds
Roster
Pitchers: Ice Box Chamberlain; Lem Cross; George Darby; Frank Dwyer; Bumpus Jones; Silver King; Tony Mullane; Tom Parrott; Mike Sullivan	Catchers: Connie Murphy; Morgan Murphy; Farmer Vaughn; Infielders: Charlie Comiskey; Arlie Latham; Bid McPhee; Frank Motz; Germany Smith	Outfielders: Jim Canavan; Bob Caruthers; Charlie Duffee; George Henry; Bug Holliday; Jack McCarthy; Jud Smith; George Ulrich; Piggy Ward	Manager: Charlie Comiskey

== Player stats ==
=== Batting ===
==== Starters by position ====
Note: Pos = Position; G = Games played; AB = At bats; H = Hits; Avg. = Batting average; HR = Home runs; RBI = Runs batted in

Pos	Player	G	AB	H	Avg.	HR	RBI
C	Farmer Vaughn	121	483	135	.280	1	108
1B	Charlie Comiskey	64	259	57	.220	0	26
2B	Bid McPhee	127	491	138	.281	3	68
SS	Germany Smith	130	500	118	.236	4	56
3B	Arlie Latham	127	531	150	.282	2	49
OF	Jack McCarthy	49	195	55	.282	0	22
OF	Bug Holliday	126	500	155	.310	5	89
OF	Jim Canavan	121	461	104	.226	5	64

==== Other batters ====
Note: G = Games played; AB = At bats; H = Hits; Avg. = Batting average; HR = Home runs; RBI = Runs batted in

Player	G	AB	H	Avg.	HR	RBI
Morgan Murphy	57	200	47	.235	1	19
Frank Motz	43	156	40	.256	2	25
Piggy Ward	42	150	42	.280	0	10
George Henry	21	83	23	.277	0	13
Bob Caruthers	13	48	14	.292	1	8
Jud Smith	17	43	10	.233	1	5
Connie Murphy	6	17	3	.176	0	2
Charlie Duffee	4	12	2	.167	0	0
George Ulrich	1	3	0	.000	0	0

=== Pitching ===
==== Starting pitchers ====
Note: G = Games pitched; IP = Innings pitched; W = Wins; L = Losses; ERA = Earned run average; SO = Strikeouts

Player	G	IP	W	L	ERA	SO
Frank Dwyer	37	287.1	18	15	4.13	53
Ice Box Chamberlain	34	241.0	16	12	3.73	59
Mike Sullivan	27	183.2	8	11	5.05	40
Tom Parrott	22	154.0	10	7	4.09	83
Tony Mullane	15	122.1	6	6	4.41	24
Silver King	17	105.0	5	6	4.89	30
George Darby	4	29.0	1	1	7.76	6
Lem Cross	3	21.0	0	2	5.57	7

==== Other pitchers ====
Note: G = Games pitched; IP = Innings pitched; W = Wins; L = Losses; ERA = Earned run average; SO = Strikeouts

Player	G	IP	W	L	ERA	SO
Bumpus Jones	6	28.2	1	3	10.05	6
