= 1893 St. Louis Browns season =

Major League Baseball season

1893 St. Louis Browns
- League: National League
- Ballpark: New Sportsman's Park
- City: St. Louis, Missouri
- Record: 57–75 (.432)
- League place: 10th
- Owners: Chris von der Ahe
- Managers: Bill Watkins
- Stats: ESPN.com; Baseball Reference

The 1893 St. Louis Browns season was the team's 12th season in St. Louis, Missouri and the second season in the National League. The Browns went 57–75 during the season and finished tenth in the National League.

This was the Browns' first season playing in New Sportsman's Park where they would remain until 1920.

== Regular season ==
=== Season standings ===
National League
Team	W	L	Pct.	GB	Home	Road
Boston Beaneaters	86	43	.667	—	49‍–‍15	37‍–‍28
Pittsburgh Pirates	81	48	.628	5	54‍–‍19	27‍–‍29
Cleveland Spiders	73	55	.570	12½	47‍–‍22	26‍–‍33
Philadelphia Phillies	72	57	.558	14	43‍–‍22	29‍–‍35
New York Giants	68	64	.515	19½	49‍–‍20	19‍–‍44
Cincinnati Reds	65	63	.508	20½	37‍–‍27	28‍–‍36
Brooklyn Grooms	65	63	.508	20½	43‍–‍24	22‍–‍39
Baltimore Orioles	60	70	.462	26½	36‍–‍24	24‍–‍46
Chicago Colts	56	71	.441	29	38‍–‍34	18‍–‍37
St. Louis Browns	57	75	.432	30½	40‍–‍30	17‍–‍45
Louisville Colonels	50	75	.400	34	24‍–‍28	26‍–‍47
Washington Senators	40	89	.310	46	21‍–‍27	19‍–‍62

=== Record vs. opponents ===
1893 National League record Sources:
Team	BAL	BSN	BRO	CHI	CIN	CLE	LOU	NYG	PHI	PIT	STL	WAS
Baltimore	—	2–10	10–2	5–7	4–8	8–4	5–5	4–8	5–7	1–11	9–3	7–5
Boston	10–2	—	8–4	8–3–1	6–6	7–5	10–2	8–4	8–4	4–6–1	10–2	7–5
Brooklyn	2–10	4–8	—	7–3	4–8	5–7–1	7–5	6–6	6–5–1	8–4	8–4	8–3
Chicago	7–5	3–8–1	3–7	—	5–7	4–8	6–4	7–5	6–6	3–9	3–9	9–3
Cincinnati	8–4	6–6	8–4	7–5	—	6–5	6–6	6–6–1	1–9–1	3–9	7–5–1	7–4
Cleveland	4–8	5–7	7–5–1	8–4	5–6	—	6–3	6–6	3–9	9–3	9–3	11–1
Louisville	5–5	2–10	5–7	4–6	6–6	3–6	—	5–7–1	4–8	4–8	4–8	8–4
New York	8–4	4–8	6–6	5–7	6–6–1	6–6	7–5–1	—	7–5–1	4–8–1	8–4	7–5
Philadelphia	7–5	4–8	5–6–1	6–6	9–1–1	9–3	8–4	5–7–1	—	7–5	4–8–1	8–4
Pittsburgh	11–1	6–4–1	4–8	9–3	9–3	3–9	8–4	8–4–1	5–7	—	9–3	9–2
St. Louis	3–9	2–10	4–8	9–3	5–7–1	3–9	8–4	4–8	8–4–1	3–9	—	8–4–1
Washington	5–7	5–7	3–8	3–9	4–7	1–11	4–8	5–7	4–8	2–9	4–8–1	—

=== Roster ===
1893 St. Louis Browns
Roster
Pitchers: Ted Breitenstein; Dad Clarkson; John Dolan; Kid Gleason; Bill Hawke; Pink Hawley; Frank Pears	Catchers: Dick Buckley; Joe Gunson; Pat McCauley; Heinie Peitz; Art Twineham; Infielders: Jack Crooks; Bones Ely; Jack Glasscock; Dennis O'Neill; Joe Quinn; Jud Smith; Perry Werden	Outfielders: Jimmy Bannon; Steve Brodie; Duff Cooley; Tommy Dowd; Charlie Frank; Bill Goodenough; Sandy Griffin; Frank Shugart; Kid Summers; Lew Whistler	Manager: Bill Watkins

== Player stats ==
=== Batting ===
==== Starters by position ====
Note: Pos = Position; G = Games played; AB = At bats; H = Hits; Avg. = Batting average; HR = Home runs; RBI = Runs batted in

Pos	Player	G	AB	H	Avg.	HR	RBI
C	Heinie Peitz	96	362	92	.254	1	45
1B	Perry Werden	125	500	138	.276	1	94
2B	Joe Quinn	135	547	126	.230	0	71
SS	Jack Glasscock	48	195	56	.287	1	26
3B	Jack Crooks	128	448	106	.237	1	48
OF	Charlie Frank	40	164	55	.335	1	17
OF	Steve Brodie	107	469	149	.318	2	79
OF	Tommy Dowd	132	581	164	.282	1	54

==== Other batters ====
Note: G = Games played; AB = At bats; H = Hits; Avg. = Batting average; HR = Home runs; RBI = Runs batted in

Player	G	AB	H	Avg.	HR	RBI
Frank Shugart	59	246	69	.280	0	28
Bones Ely	44	178	45	.253	0	16
Joe Gunson	40	151	41	.272	0	15
Duff Cooley	29	107	37	.346	0	21
Jimmy Bannon	26	107	36	.336	0	15
Sandy Griffin	23	92	18	.196	0	9
Art Twineham	14	48	15	.313	0	11
Lew Whistler	10	38	9	.237	0	2
Bill Goodenough	10	31	5	.161	0	2
Dennis O'Neill	7	25	3	.120	0	2
Dick Buckley	9	23	4	.174	0	1
Pat McCauley	5	16	1	.063	0	0
Jud Smith	4	13	1	.077	0	0
Kid Summers	2	1	0	.000	0	0

=== Pitching ===
==== Starting pitchers ====
Note: G = Games pitched; IP = Innings pitched; W = Wins; L = Losses; ERA = Earned run average; SO = Strikeouts

Player	G	IP	W	L	ERA	SO
Ted Breitenstein	48	382.2	19	24	3.18	102
Kid Gleason	48	380.1	21	22	4.61	86
Pink Hawley	31	227.0	5	17	4.60	73
Dad Clarkson	24	186.1	12	9	3.48	37
Bill Hawke	1	5.1	0	1	5.06	1
Jimmy Bannon	1	4.0	0	1	22.50	1

==== Other pitchers ====
Note: G = Games pitched; IP = Innings pitched; W = Wins; L = Losses; ERA = Earned run average; SO = Strikeouts

Player	G	IP	W	L	ERA	SO
John Dolan	3	17.1	0	1	4.15	1

==== Relief pitchers ====
Note: G = Games pitched; W = Wins; L = Losses; SV = Saves; ERA = Earned run average; SO = Strikeouts

Player	G	W	L	SV	ERA	SO
Frank Pears	1	0	0	0	13.50	0
