= 1893 Baltimore Orioles season =

1893 Baltimore Orioles
- League: National League
- Ballpark: Union Park
- City: Baltimore, Maryland
- Record: 60–70 (.462)
- League place: 8th
- Owner: Harry Von der Horst
- Manager: Ned Hanlon

== Regular season ==
=== Season standings ===
National League
Team	W	L	Pct.	GB	Home	Road
Boston Beaneaters	86	43	.667	—	49‍–‍15	37‍–‍28
Pittsburgh Pirates	81	48	.628	5	54‍–‍19	27‍–‍29
Cleveland Spiders	73	55	.570	12½	47‍–‍22	26‍–‍33
Philadelphia Phillies	72	57	.558	14	43‍–‍22	29‍–‍35
New York Giants	68	64	.515	19½	49‍–‍20	19‍–‍44
Cincinnati Reds	65	63	.508	20½	37‍–‍27	28‍–‍36
Brooklyn Grooms	65	63	.508	20½	43‍–‍24	22‍–‍39
Baltimore Orioles	60	70	.462	26½	36‍–‍24	24‍–‍46
Chicago Colts	56	71	.441	29	38‍–‍34	18‍–‍37
St. Louis Browns	57	75	.432	30½	40‍–‍30	17‍–‍45
Louisville Colonels	50	75	.400	34	24‍–‍28	26‍–‍47
Washington Senators	40	89	.310	46	21‍–‍27	19‍–‍62

=== Record vs. opponents ===
1893 National League record Sources:
Team	BAL	BSN	BRO	CHI	CIN	CLE	LOU	NYG	PHI	PIT	STL	WAS
Baltimore	—	2–10	10–2	5–7	4–8	8–4	5–5	4–8	5–7	1–11	9–3	7–5
Boston	10–2	—	8–4	8–3–1	6–6	7–5	10–2	8–4	8–4	4–6–1	10–2	7–5
Brooklyn	2–10	4–8	—	7–3	4–8	5–7–1	7–5	6–6	6–5–1	8–4	8–4	8–3
Chicago	7–5	3–8–1	3–7	—	5–7	4–8	6–4	7–5	6–6	3–9	3–9	9–3
Cincinnati	8–4	6–6	8–4	7–5	—	6–5	6–6	6–6–1	1–9–1	3–9	7–5–1	7–4
Cleveland	4–8	5–7	7–5–1	8–4	5–6	—	6–3	6–6	3–9	9–3	9–3	11–1
Louisville	5–5	2–10	5–7	4–6	6–6	3–6	—	5–7–1	4–8	4–8	4–8	8–4
New York	8–4	4–8	6–6	5–7	6–6–1	6–6	7–5–1	—	7–5–1	4–8–1	8–4	7–5
Philadelphia	7–5	4–8	5–6–1	6–6	9–1–1	9–3	8–4	5–7–1	—	7–5	4–8–1	8–4
Pittsburgh	11–1	6–4–1	4–8	9–3	9–3	3–9	8–4	8–4–1	5–7	—	9–3	9–2
St. Louis	3–9	2–10	4–8	9–3	5–7–1	3–9	8–4	4–8	8–4–1	3–9	—	8–4–1
Washington	5–7	5–7	3–8	3–9	4–7	1–11	4–8	5–7	4–8	2–9	4–8–1	—

=== Notable transactions ===
- June 7, 1893: Tim O'Rourke was traded by the Orioles to the Louisville Colonels for Hughie Jennings and Harry Taylor.

=== Roster ===
1893 Baltimore Orioles
Roster
Pitchers: Kirtley Baker; Stub Brown; Bill Hawke; Sadie McMahon; Edgar McNabb; Tony Mullane; Crazy Schmit; Jack Wadsworth	Catchers: Boileryard Clarke; Wilbert Robinson; Infielders: William Brown; Hughie Jennings; John McGraw; Jocko Milligan; Heinie Reitz; Billy Shindle; Harry Taylor	Outfielders: Steve Brodie; Bob Gilks; Joe Kelley; Jim Long; Tim O'Rourke; Harry Stovey; George Treadway; Piggy Ward	Manager: Ned Hanlon

== Player stats ==
=== Batting ===
==== Starters by position ====
Note: Pos = Position; G = Games played; AB = At bats; H = Hits; Avg. = Batting average; HR = Home runs; RBI = Runs batted in

Pos	Player	G	AB	H	Avg.	HR	RBI
C	Wilbert Robinson	95	359	120	.334	3	57
1B	Harry Taylor	88	360	102	.283	1	54
2B	Heinie Reitz	130	490	140	.286	1	76
SS	John McGraw	127	480	154	.321	5	64
3B	Billy Shindle	125	521	136	.261	1	75
OF	Jim Long	55	226	48	.212	2	25
OF	George Treadway	115	458	119	.260	1	67
OF	Joe Kelley	125	502	153	.305	9	76

==== Other batters ====
Note: G = Games played; AB = At bats; H = Hits; Avg. = Batting average; HR = Home runs; RBI = Runs batted in

Player	G	AB	H	Avg.	HR	RBI
Boileryard Clarke	49	183	32	.175	1	24
Tim O'Rourke	31	135	49	.363	0	19
Jocko Milligan	24	102	25	.245	1	19
Steve Brodie	25	97	35	.361	0	19
Bob Gilks	16	64	17	.266	0	7
Hughie Jennings	16	55	14	.255	1	6
Piggy Ward	11	49	12	.245	0	5
William Brown	7	32	4	.125	0	5
Harry Stovey	8	26	4	.154	0	5

=== Pitching ===
==== Starting pitchers ====
Note: G = Games pitched; IP = Innings pitched; W = Wins; L = Losses; ERA = Earned run average; SO = Strikeouts

Player	G	IP	W	L	ERA	SO
Sadie McMahon	43	346.1	23	18	4.37	79
Tony Mullane	34	244.2	12	16	4.45	71
Bill Hawke	29	225.0	11	16	4.76	69
Kirtley Baker	15	91.2	3	8	8.44	26
Jack Wadsworth	3	16.0	0	3	11.25	2

==== Other pitchers ====
Note: G = Games pitched; IP = Innings pitched; W = Wins; L = Losses; ERA = Earned run average; SO = Strikeouts

Player	G	IP	W	L	ERA	SO
Edgar McNabb	21	142.0	8	7	4.12	18
Crazy Schmit	9	49.0	3	2	6.61	10

==== Relief pitchers ====
Note: G = Games pitched; W = Wins; L = Losses; SV = Saves; ERA = Earned run average; SO = Strikeouts

Player	G	W	L	SV	ERA	SO
Stub Brown	2	0	0	0	6.00	0
