= Seth Sigsby =

American baseball player (1874–1953)

- Pitcher
- Born: April 30, 1874; Cobleskill, New York, U.S.
- Died: September 15, 1953 (aged 79); Schenectady, New York, U.S.
- Batted: Unknown Threw: Unknown

MLB debut
- June 27, 1893, for the New York Giants

Last MLB appearance
- June 27, 1893, for the New York Giants

MLB statistics
- Win–loss record: 0–0
- Earned run average: 9.00
- Strikeouts: 2
- Stats at Baseball Reference

Teams
- New York Giants (1893)

Seth De Witt Sigsby (born Seth De Witt, April 30, 1874 – September 15, 1953) was an American Major League Baseball pitcher who played in 1893 with the New York Giants.

He was born in Cobleskill, New York and died in Schenectady, New York.
