= 1893 New York Giants season =

1893 New York Giants
- League: National League
- Ballpark: Polo Grounds
- City: New York City
- Record: 68–64 (.515)
- League place: 5th
- Owners: Cornelius Van Cott
- Managers: John Montgomery Ward

The 1893 New York Giants season was the franchise's 11th season. The team finished in fifth place in the National League with a 68–64 record, 19.5 games behind the Boston Beaneaters.

== Regular season ==
=== Season standings ===
National League
| Team | W | L | Pct. | GB | Home | Road |
|---|---|---|---|---|---|---|
| Boston Beaneaters | 86 | 43 | .667 | — | 49‍–‍15 | 37‍–‍28 |
| Pittsburgh Pirates | 81 | 48 | .628 | 5 | 54‍–‍19 | 27‍–‍29 |
| Cleveland Spiders | 73 | 55 | .570 | 12½ | 47‍–‍22 | 26‍–‍33 |
| Philadelphia Phillies | 72 | 57 | .558 | 14 | 43‍–‍22 | 29‍–‍35 |
| New York Giants | 68 | 64 | .515 | 19½ | 49‍–‍20 | 19‍–‍44 |
| Cincinnati Reds | 65 | 63 | .508 | 20½ | 37‍–‍27 | 28‍–‍36 |
| Brooklyn Grooms | 65 | 63 | .508 | 20½ | 43‍–‍24 | 22‍–‍39 |
| Baltimore Orioles | 60 | 70 | .462 | 26½ | 36‍–‍24 | 24‍–‍46 |
| Chicago Colts | 56 | 71 | .441 | 29 | 38‍–‍34 | 18‍–‍37 |
| St. Louis Browns | 57 | 75 | .432 | 30½ | 40‍–‍30 | 17‍–‍45 |
| Louisville Colonels | 50 | 75 | .400 | 34 | 24‍–‍28 | 26‍–‍47 |
| Washington Senators | 40 | 89 | .310 | 46 | 21‍–‍27 | 19‍–‍62 |

=== Record vs. opponents ===
1893 National League record Sources:
| Team | BAL | BSN | BRO | CHI | CIN | CLE | LOU | NYG | PHI | PIT | STL | WAS |
|---|---|---|---|---|---|---|---|---|---|---|---|---|
| Baltimore | — | 2–10 | 10–2 | 5–7 | 4–8 | 8–4 | 5–5 | 4–8 | 5–7 | 1–11 | 9–3 | 7–5 |
| Boston | 10–2 | — | 8–4 | 8–3–1 | 6–6 | 7–5 | 10–2 | 8–4 | 8–4 | 4–6–1 | 10–2 | 7–5 |
| Brooklyn | 2–10 | 4–8 | — | 7–3 | 4–8 | 5–7–1 | 7–5 | 6–6 | 6–5–1 | 8–4 | 8–4 | 8–3 |
| Chicago | 7–5 | 3–8–1 | 3–7 | — | 5–7 | 4–8 | 6–4 | 7–5 | 6–6 | 3–9 | 3–9 | 9–3 |
| Cincinnati | 8–4 | 6–6 | 8–4 | 7–5 | — | 6–5 | 6–6 | 6–6–1 | 1–9–1 | 3–9 | 7–5–1 | 7–4 |
| Cleveland | 4–8 | 5–7 | 7–5–1 | 8–4 | 5–6 | — | 6–3 | 6–6 | 3–9 | 9–3 | 9–3 | 11–1 |
| Louisville | 5–5 | 2–10 | 5–7 | 4–6 | 6–6 | 3–6 | — | 5–7–1 | 4–8 | 4–8 | 4–8 | 8–4 |
| New York | 8–4 | 4–8 | 6–6 | 5–7 | 6–6–1 | 6–6 | 7–5–1 | — | 7–5–1 | 4–8–1 | 8–4 | 7–5 |
| Philadelphia | 7–5 | 4–8 | 5–6–1 | 6–6 | 9–1–1 | 9–3 | 8–4 | 5–7–1 | — | 7–5 | 4–8–1 | 8–4 |
| Pittsburgh | 11–1 | 6–4–1 | 4–8 | 9–3 | 9–3 | 3–9 | 8–4 | 8–4–1 | 5–7 | — | 9–3 | 9–2 |
| St. Louis | 3–9 | 2–10 | 4–8 | 9–3 | 5–7–1 | 3–9 | 8–4 | 4–8 | 8–4–1 | 3–9 | — | 8–4–1 |
| Washington | 5–7 | 5–7 | 3–8 | 3–9 | 4–7 | 1–11 | 4–8 | 5–7 | 4–8 | 2–9 | 4–8–1 | — |

=== Notable transactions ===
- July 1893: Les German was purchased by the Giants from the Augusta Electricians.

=== Roster ===
1893 New York Giants
Roster
| Pitchers: Mark Baldwin; Ed Crane; George Davies; Red Donahue; Frank Foreman; Les German; Bumpus Jones; Silver King; Charlie Petty; Amos Rusie; Crazy Schmit; Seth Sigsby | Catchers: Jack Doyle; King Kelly; Jack McMahon; Jocko Milligan; Parke Wilson; Infielders: Roger Connor; George Davis; Shorty Fuller; Shorty Howe; John Ward | Outfielders: Eddie Burke; Willie Keeler; William Kinsler; Harry Lyons; General Stafford; Mike Tiernan | Manager: John Ward |

== Player stats ==
=== Batting ===
==== Starters by position ====
Note: Pos = Position; G = Games played; AB = At bats; H = Hits; Avg. = Batting average; HR = Home runs; RBI = Runs batted in

| Pos | Player | G | AB | H | Avg. | HR | RBI |
|---|---|---|---|---|---|---|---|
| C | Jack Doyle | 82 | 318 | 102 | .321 | 1 | 51 |
| 1B | Roger Connor | 135 | 511 | 156 | .305 | 11 | 105 |
| 2B | John Ward | 135 | 588 | 193 | .328 | 2 | 77 |
| SS | Shorty Fuller | 130 | 474 | 112 | .236 | 0 | 51 |
| 3B | George Davis | 133 | 549 | 195 | .355 | 11 | 119 |
| OF | Eddie Burke | 135 | 537 | 150 | .279 | 9 | 80 |
| OF | General Stafford | 67 | 281 | 79 | .281 | 5 | 27 |
| OF | Mike Tiernan | 125 | 511 | 158 | .309 | 14 | 102 |

==== Other batters ====
Note: G = Games played; AB = At bats; H = Hits; Avg. = Batting average; HR = Home runs; RBI = Runs batted in

| Player | G | AB | H | Avg. | HR | RBI |
|---|---|---|---|---|---|---|
| Harry Lyons | 47 | 187 | 51 | .273 | 0 | 21 |
| Jocko Milligan | 42 | 147 | 34 | .231 | 1 | 25 |
| Parke Wilson | 31 | 114 | 28 | .246 | 2 | 21 |
| King Kelly | 20 | 67 | 18 | .269 | 0 | 15 |
| Jack McMahon | 11 | 30 | 10 | .333 | 0 | 4 |
| Willie Keeler | 7 | 24 | 8 | .333 | 1 | 7 |
| Shorty Howe | 1 | 5 | 3 | .600 | 0 | 2 |
| William Kinsler | 1 | 3 | 0 | .000 | 0 | 0 |

=== Pitching ===
==== Starting pitchers ====
Note: G = Games pitched; IP = Innings pitched; W = Wins; L = Losses; ERA = Earned run average; SO = Strikeouts

| Player | G | IP | W | L | ERA | SO |
|---|---|---|---|---|---|---|
| Amos Rusie | 56 | 482.0 | 33 | 21 | 3.23 | 208 |
| Mark Baldwin | 45 | 331.1 | 16 | 20 | 4.10 | 100 |
| Les German | 20 | 152.0 | 8 | 8 | 4.14 | 35 |
| Silver King | 7 | 49.0 | 3 | 4 | 8.63 | 13 |
| Crazy Schmit | 4 | 20.2 | 0 | 2 | 7.40 | 5 |
| Bumpus Jones | 1 | 4.0 | 0 | 1 | 11.25 | 1 |

==== Other pitchers ====
Note: G = Games pitched; IP = Innings pitched; W = Wins; L = Losses; ERA = Earned run average; SO = Strikeouts

| Player | G | IP | W | L | ERA | SO |
|---|---|---|---|---|---|---|
| Ed Crane | 10 | 68.1 | 2 | 4 | 5.93 | 11 |
| Charlie Petty | 9 | 54.0 | 5 | 2 | 3.33 | 12 |
| George Davies | 5 | 36.1 | 1 | 1 | 6.19 | 7 |
| Frank Foreman | 2 | 5.2 | 0 | 1 | 27.00 | 0 |

==== Relief pitchers ====
Note: G = Games pitched; W = Wins; L = Losses; SV = Saves; ERA = Earned run average; SO = Strikeouts

| Player | G | W | L | SV | ERA | SO |
|---|---|---|---|---|---|---|
| Red Donahue | 2 | 0 | 0 | 1 | 9.00 | 1 |
| Seth Sigsby | 1 | 0 | 0 | 0 | 9.00 | 2 |
