= 1893 Boston Beaneaters season =

1893 Boston Beaneaters
- National League champions
- League: National League
- Ballpark: South End Grounds
- City: Boston, Massachusetts
- Record: 86–43–2 (.667)
- League place: 1st
- Owner: Arthur Soden
- Manager: Frank Selee (4th season)

The 1893 Boston Beaneaters season was the 23rd season of the franchise. They won their third straight and sixth overall National League pennant with a record of 86–43–2 (.667), 5.0 games ahead of the second-place Pittsburgh Pirates.

== Regular season ==
=== Season standings ===
National League
Team	W	L	Pct.	GB	Home	Road
Boston Beaneaters	86	43	.667	—	49‍–‍15	37‍–‍28
Pittsburgh Pirates	81	48	.628	5	54‍–‍19	27‍–‍29
Cleveland Spiders	73	55	.570	12½	47‍–‍22	26‍–‍33
Philadelphia Phillies	72	57	.558	14	43‍–‍22	29‍–‍35
New York Giants	68	64	.515	19½	49‍–‍20	19‍–‍44
Cincinnati Reds	65	63	.508	20½	37‍–‍27	28‍–‍36
Brooklyn Grooms	65	63	.508	20½	43‍–‍24	22‍–‍39
Baltimore Orioles	60	70	.462	26½	36‍–‍24	24‍–‍46
Chicago Colts	56	71	.441	29	38‍–‍34	18‍–‍37
St. Louis Browns	57	75	.432	30½	40‍–‍30	17‍–‍45
Louisville Colonels	50	75	.400	34	24‍–‍28	26‍–‍47
Washington Senators	40	89	.310	46	21‍–‍27	19‍–‍62

=== Record vs. opponents ===
1893 National League record Sources:
Team	BAL	BSN	BRO	CHI	CIN	CLE	LOU	NYG	PHI	PIT	STL	WAS
Baltimore	—	2–10	10–2	5–7	4–8	8–4	5–5	4–8	5–7	1–11	9–3	7–5
Boston	10–2	—	8–4	8–3–1	6–6	7–5	10–2	8–4	8–4	4–6–1	10–2	7–5
Brooklyn	2–10	4–8	—	7–3	4–8	5–7–1	7–5	6–6	6–5–1	8–4	8–4	8–3
Chicago	7–5	3–8–1	3–7	—	5–7	4–8	6–4	7–5	6–6	3–9	3–9	9–3
Cincinnati	8–4	6–6	8–4	7–5	—	6–5	6–6	6–6–1	1–9–1	3–9	7–5–1	7–4
Cleveland	4–8	5–7	7–5–1	8–4	5–6	—	6–3	6–6	3–9	9–3	9–3	11–1
Louisville	5–5	2–10	5–7	4–6	6–6	3–6	—	5–7–1	4–8	4–8	4–8	8–4
New York	8–4	4–8	6–6	5–7	6–6–1	6–6	7–5–1	—	7–5–1	4–8–1	8–4	7–5
Philadelphia	7–5	4–8	5–6–1	6–6	9–1–1	9–3	8–4	5–7–1	—	7–5	4–8–1	8–4
Pittsburgh	11–1	6–4–1	4–8	9–3	9–3	3–9	8–4	8–4–1	5–7	—	9–3	9–2
St. Louis	3–9	2–10	4–8	9–3	5–7–1	3–9	8–4	4–8	8–4–1	3–9	—	8–4–1
Washington	5–7	5–7	3–8	3–9	4–7	1–11	4–8	5–7	4–8	2–9	4–8–1	—

=== Roster ===
1893 Boston Beaneaters
Roster
Pitchers: Bill Coyle; Jim Garry; Hank Gastright; Kid Nichols; Bill Quarles; Harry Staley; Jack Stivetts	Catchers: Charlie Bennett; Charlie Ganzel; Bill Merritt; Infielders: Herman Long; Bobby Lowe; Billy Nash; Tommy Tucker	Outfielders: Cliff Carroll; Hugh Duffy; Tommy McCarthy; Bill Van Dyke	Manager: Frank Selee

== Player stats ==
=== Batting ===
==== Starters by position ====
Note: Pos = Position; G = Games played; AB = At bats; H = Hits; Avg. = Batting average; HR = Home runs; RBI = Runs batted in

Pos	Player	G	AB	H	Avg.	HR	RBI
C	Charlie Bennett	60	191	40	.209	4	27
1B	Tommy Tucker	121	486	138	.284	7	91
2B	Bobby Lowe	126	526	157	.298	14	89
SS	Herman Long	128	552	159	.288	6	58
3B	Billy Nash	128	485	141	.291	10	123
OF	Hugh Duffy	131	560	203	.363	6	118
OF	Cliff Carroll	120	438	98	.224	2	54
OF	Tommy McCarthy	116	462	160	.346	5	111

==== Other batters ====
Note: G = Games played; AB = At bats; H = Hits; Avg. = Batting average; HR = Home runs; RBI = Runs batted in

Player	G	AB	H	Avg.	HR	RBI
Charlie Ganzel	73	281	75	.267	1	48
Bill Merritt	39	141	49	.348	3	26
Bill Van Dyke	3	12	3	.250	0	1

=== Pitching ===
==== Starting pitchers ====
Note: G = Games pitched; IP = Innings pitched; W = Wins; L = Losses; ERA = Earned run average; SO = Strikeouts

Player	G	IP	W	L	ERA	SO
Kid Nichols	52	425.0	34	14	3.52	94
Jack Stivetts	38	283.2	20	12	4.41	61
Harry Staley	36	263.0	18	10	5.13	61
Hank Gastright	19	156.0	12	4	5.13	27
Bill Quarles	3	27.0	2	1	4.67	6

==== Other pitchers ====
Note: G = Games pitched; IP = Innings pitched; W = Wins; L = Losses; ERA = Earned run average; SO = Strikeouts

Player	G	IP	W	L	ERA	SO
Bill Coyle	2	8.0	0	1	9.00	2

==== Relief pitchers ====
Note: G = Games pitched; W = Wins; L = Losses; SV = Saves; ERA = Earned run average; SO = Strikeouts

Player	G	W	L	SV	ERA	SO
Jim Garry	1	0	1	0	63.00	2
