= Frank O'Connor (baseball) =

American baseball player (1868–1913)

- Pitcher
- Born: September 15, 1868; Keeseville, New York, U.S.
- Died: December 26, 1913 (aged 45); Brattleboro, Vermont, U.S.
- Batted: Left Threw: Left

MLB debut
- August 3, 1893, for the Philadelphia Phillies

Last MLB appearance
- August 7, 1893, for the Philadelphia Phillies

MLB statistics
- Win–loss record: 0–0
- Earned run average: 11.25
- Strikeouts: 0
- Batting average: 1.000 (2-for-2)
- Stats at Baseball Reference

Teams
- Philadelphia Phillies (1893)

Frank Henry O'Connor (September 15, 1868 – December 26, 1913) was an American physician and professional baseball player who played for the 1893 Philadelphia Phillies.

== Biography ==
O'Connor was born in 1868 in Keeseville, New York. He attended and played baseball for three different colleges—St. Joseph College in Burlington, Vermont; the University of Vermont (UVM), also in Burlington; and Dartmouth College in Hanover, New Hampshire. He also studied in the medical schools at UVM and Dartmouth.

O'Connor was 24 years old when he broke into the major leagues on August 3, 1893, with the Philadelphia Phillies as a left-handed pitcher. He played in only three games, with a win–loss record of 0–0 and an earned run average (ERA) of 11.25. He had two hits in two at bats, including a home run, for a rare 1.000 batting average. O'Connor became the second player (and the first pitcher) to hit a home run in their final major-league at bat, the first having been outfielder Buck West in 1890.

O'Connor subsequently studied in Montreal, and did medical training in Brooklyn. He moved to Brattleboro, Vermont, in 1904 and opened a medical practice there. He died in his office in Brattleboro on the day after Christmas of 1913.

== See also ==
- List of Major League Baseball players with a home run in their final major league at bat
