= Charlie Hastings =

American baseball player (1870–1934)

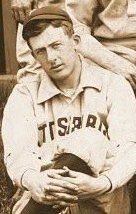
- Pitcher
- Born: November 11, 1870; Ironton, Ohio, U.S.
- Died: August 3, 1934 (aged 63); Parkersburg, West Virginia, U.S.
- Batted: Unknown Threw: Unknown

MLB debut
- May 3, 1893, for the Cleveland Spiders

Last MLB appearance
- September 3, 1898, for the Pittsburgh Pirates

MLB statistics
- Win–loss record: 18-29
- Earned run average: 4.55
- Strikeouts: 115
- Stats at Baseball Reference

Teams
- Cleveland Spiders (1893); Pittsburgh Pirates (1896–1898)

Charles Morton Hastings (November 11, 1870 – August 3, 1934) was an American professional baseball player who played pitcher in the Major Leagues in 1893-1898. He would play for the Cleveland Spiders and Pittsburgh Pirates.
