= Bill Coyle (baseball) =

American baseball player (1871–1941)

- Pitcher
- Born: September 20, 1871; Kentucky, U.S.
- Died: June 4, 1941 (aged 69); San Francisco, California, U.S.
- Batted: Unknown Threw: Right

MLB debut
- July 7, 1893, for the Boston Beaneaters

Last MLB appearance
- July 8, 1893, for the Boston Beaneaters

MLB statistics
- Win–loss record: 0-1
- Strikeouts: 2
- Earned run average: 9.00
- Stats at Baseball Reference

Teams
- Boston Beaneaters (1893)

William Claude Coyle (September 20, 1871 – June 4, 1941) was an American pitcher in Major League Baseball for the 1893 Boston Beaneaters. He then played in the minors through 1897. After his playing career ended, he was briefly a manager in 1897 in the Interstate League.
