= Bill Eagan =

American baseball player (1869–1905)

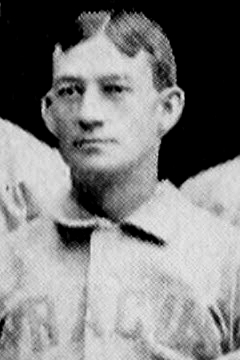
- Second baseman
- Born: June 1, 1869; Camden, New Jersey, U.S.
- Died: February 13, 1905 (aged 35); Denver, Colorado, U.S.
- Batted: Unknown Threw: Unknown

MLB debut
- April 8, 1891, for the St. Louis Browns

Last MLB appearance
- June 2, 1898, for the Pittsburgh Pirates

MLB statistics
- Batting average: .239
- Home runs: 4
- Runs batted in: 50
- Stats at Baseball Reference

Teams
- St. Louis Browns (1891); Chicago Colts (1893); Pittsburgh Pirates (1898)

William Eagan (June 1, 1869 – February 13, 1905) was an American professional baseball player who played second base in the Major Leagues from 1891–1898.
