= George Henry (baseball) =

American baseball player (1863–1934)

- Outfielder
- Born: August 10, 1863; Philadelphia, Pennsylvania, U.S.
- Died: December 30, 1934 (aged 71); Lynn, Massachusetts, U.S.
- Batted: Right Threw: Right

MLB debut
- April 27, 1893, for the Cincinnati Reds

Last MLB appearance
- June 3, 1893, for the Cincinnati Reds

MLB statistics
- Batting average: .277
- Home runs: 0
- Runs batted in: 13
- Stats at Baseball Reference

Teams
- Cincinnati Reds (1893)

George Washington Henry (August 10, 1863 – December 30, 1934) was an American professional baseball player who played outfield in the National League for the 1893 Cincinnati Reds. He played in the minor leagues through 1905.
