= 1893 Washington Senators season =

1893 Washington Senators
- League: National League
- Ballpark: Boundary Field
- City: Washington, D.C.
- Record: 40–89 (.310)
- League place: 12th
- Owners: J. Earl Wagner
- Managers: Jim O'Rourke

The 1893 Washington Senators baseball team finished the season with a 40–89 record, last place in the National League.

== Regular season ==
=== Season standings ===
National League
Team	W	L	Pct.	GB	Home	Road
Boston Beaneaters	86	43	.667	—	49‍–‍15	37‍–‍28
Pittsburgh Pirates	81	48	.628	5	54‍–‍19	27‍–‍29
Cleveland Spiders	73	55	.570	12½	47‍–‍22	26‍–‍33
Philadelphia Phillies	72	57	.558	14	43‍–‍22	29‍–‍35
New York Giants	68	64	.515	19½	49‍–‍20	19‍–‍44
Cincinnati Reds	65	63	.508	20½	37‍–‍27	28‍–‍36
Brooklyn Grooms	65	63	.508	20½	43‍–‍24	22‍–‍39
Baltimore Orioles	60	70	.462	26½	36‍–‍24	24‍–‍46
Chicago Colts	56	71	.441	29	38‍–‍34	18‍–‍37
St. Louis Browns	57	75	.432	30½	40‍–‍30	17‍–‍45
Louisville Colonels	50	75	.400	34	24‍–‍28	26‍–‍47
Washington Senators	40	89	.310	46	21‍–‍27	19‍–‍62

=== Record vs. opponents ===
1893 National League record Sources:
Team	BAL	BSN	BRO	CHI	CIN	CLE	LOU	NYG	PHI	PIT	STL	WAS
Baltimore	—	2–10	10–2	5–7	4–8	8–4	5–5	4–8	5–7	1–11	9–3	7–5
Boston	10–2	—	8–4	8–3–1	6–6	7–5	10–2	8–4	8–4	4–6–1	10–2	7–5
Brooklyn	2–10	4–8	—	7–3	4–8	5–7–1	7–5	6–6	6–5–1	8–4	8–4	8–3
Chicago	7–5	3–8–1	3–7	—	5–7	4–8	6–4	7–5	6–6	3–9	3–9	9–3
Cincinnati	8–4	6–6	8–4	7–5	—	6–5	6–6	6–6–1	1–9–1	3–9	7–5–1	7–4
Cleveland	4–8	5–7	7–5–1	8–4	5–6	—	6–3	6–6	3–9	9–3	9–3	11–1
Louisville	5–5	2–10	5–7	4–6	6–6	3–6	—	5–7–1	4–8	4–8	4–8	8–4
New York	8–4	4–8	6–6	5–7	6–6–1	6–6	7–5–1	—	7–5–1	4–8–1	8–4	7–5
Philadelphia	7–5	4–8	5–6–1	6–6	9–1–1	9–3	8–4	5–7–1	—	7–5	4–8–1	8–4
Pittsburgh	11–1	6–4–1	4–8	9–3	9–3	3–9	8–4	8–4–1	5–7	—	9–3	9–2
St. Louis	3–9	2–10	4–8	9–3	5–7–1	3–9	8–4	4–8	8–4–1	3–9	—	8–4–1
Washington	5–7	5–7	3–8	3–9	4–7	1–11	4–8	5–7	4–8	2–9	4–8–1	—

=== Roster ===
1893 Washington Senators
Roster
Pitchers: Jesse Duryea; Duke Esper; John Graff; Al Maul; Jouett Meekin; Ben Stephens; Otis Stocksdale	Catchers: Duke Farrell; Deacon McGuire; Infielders: Henry Larkin; Joe Mulvey; Cub Stricker; Joe Sullivan; Sam Wise	Outfielders: Charlie Abbey; Dummy Hoy; Jim O'Rourke; Paul Radford	Manager: Jim O'Rourke

== Player stats ==
=== Batting ===
==== Starters by position ====
Note: Pos = Position; G = Games played; AB = At bats; H = Hits; Avg. = Batting average; HR = Home runs; RBI = Runs batted in

Pos	Player	G	AB	H	Avg.	HR	RBI
C	Duke Farrell	124	511	144	.282	4	75
1B	Henry Larkin	81	319	101	.317	4	73
2B	Sam Wise	122	521	162	.311	5	77
SS	Joe Sullivan	128	508	134	.264	2	64
3B	Joe Mulvey	55	226	53	.235	0	19
OF	Paul Radford	124	464	106	.228	2	34
OF	Dummy Hoy	130	564	138	.245	0	45
OF	Jim O'Rourke	129	547	157	.287	2	95

==== Other batters ====
Note: G = Games played; AB = At bats; H = Hits; Avg. = Batting average; HR = Home runs; RBI = Runs batted in

Player	G	AB	H	Avg.	HR	RBI
Deacon McGuire	63	237	61	.257	1	26
Cub Stricker	59	218	39	.179	0	20
Charlie Abbey	31	116	30	.259	0	12

=== Pitching ===
==== Starting pitchers ====
Note: G = Games pitched; IP = Innings pitched; W = Wins; L = Losses; ERA = Earned run average; SO = Strikeouts

Player	G	IP	W	L	ERA	SO
Duke Esper	42	334.1	12	28	4.71	78
Al Maul	37	297.0	12	21	5.30	72
Jouett Meekin	31	245.0	10	15	4.96	91
Jesse Duryea	17	117.0	4	10	7.54	20
Otis Stocksdale	11	69.0	2	8	8.22	12

==== Other pitchers ====
Note: G = Games pitched; IP = Innings pitched; W = Wins; L = Losses; ERA = Earned run average; SO = Strikeouts

Player	G	IP	W	L	ERA	SO
Ben Stephens	9	63.2	0	6	5.80	14
John Graff	2	12.0	0	1	11.25	4

==== Relief pitchers ====
Note: G = Games pitched; W = Wins; L = Losses; SV = Saves; ERA = Earned run average; SO = Strikeouts

Player	G	W	L	SV	ERA	SO
Paul Radford	1	0	0	0	18.00	1
