= Connie Murphy (baseball) =

American baseball player (1870–1945)

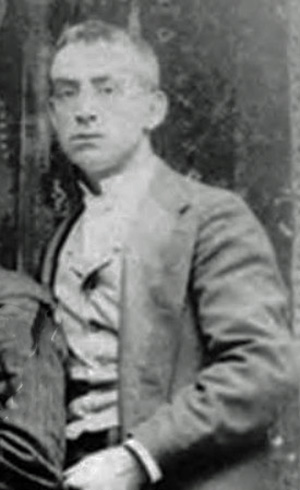
- Catcher
- Born: November 1, 1870; Northfield, Massachusetts, U.S.
- Died: December 14, 1945 (aged 75); New Bedford, Massachusetts, U.S.
- Batted: Left Threw: Right

MLB debut
- September 17, 1893, for the Cincinnati Reds

Last MLB appearance
- September 30, 1894, for the Cincinnati Reds

MLB statistics
- Batting average: .143
- Home runs: 0
- Runs batted in: 2

Teams
- Cincinnati Reds (1893–94)

Cornelius David Murphy (November 1, 1870 – December 14, 1945) was an American Major League Baseball catcher. He played parts of two seasons, 1893 and 1894, for the Cincinnati Reds. Murphy's minor league baseball career spanned seventeen seasons, from 1889 until 1905.
