= John Stafford (baseball) =

American baseball player (1870–1940)

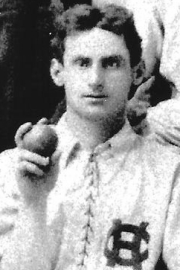
- Pitcher
- Born: April 8, 1870; Webster, Massachusetts, U.S.
- Died: July 3, 1940 (aged 70); Worcester, Massachusetts, U.S.
- Batted: Right Threw: Right

MLB debut
- June 15, 1893, for the Cleveland Spiders

Last MLB appearance
- July 7, 1893, for the Cleveland Spiders

MLB statistics
- Win–loss record: 0-1
- Earned run average: 14.14
- Strikeouts: 4
- Stats at Baseball Reference

Teams
- Cleveland Spiders (1893)

John Henry "Doc" Stafford (April 8, 1870 – July 3, 1940) was an American pitcher in Major League Baseball in 1893.

Stafford attended College of the Holy Cross in Worcester, Massachusetts, and later pitched in two games for the Cleveland Spiders in 1893. After his major league appearances, Stafford played in the minor leagues until 1898, including seasons in the New England League and the Western League. His older brother was James Joseph "General" Stafford, who played in the major leagues between 1890 and 1899.

Stafford became known as "Doc" after his playing career, when he became an optometrist in his hometown of Dudley, Massachusetts. He died in 1940, aged 70; both he and his brother are buried in Calvary Cemetery in Dudley.
