= Shorty Howe =

American baseball player

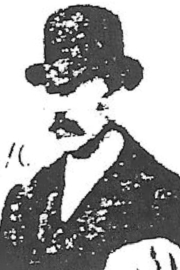
- Second baseman
- Born: April 29, 1859; New York, New York, U.S.
- Died: December 7, 1919 (aged 60); Brooklyn, New York, U.S.
- Batted: Unknown Threw: Unknown

MLB debut
- June 17, 1890, for the New York Giants

Last MLB appearance
- June 20, 1893, for the New York Giants

MLB statistics
- Batting average: .203
- Home runs: 0
- Runs batted in: 6
- Stats at Baseball Reference

Teams
- New York Giants (1890, 1893)

John Henry Howe or Hough (April 29, 1859 – December 7, 1919) was an American Major League Baseball player. He played for the New York Giants of the National League in 1890 and 1893.

== Sources ==
- Career statistics from MLB · Baseball Reference · Baseball Reference (Minors) · Retrosheet · Baseball Almanac
