= Pete Allen (baseball) =

American baseball player (1868–1946)

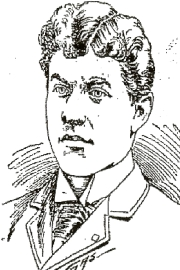
- Catcher
- Born: May 1, 1868; Columbiana, Ohio, U.S.
- Died: April 16, 1946 (aged 77); Philadelphia, Pennsylvania, U.S.
- Batted: Right Threw: Right

MLB debut
- August 4, 1893, for the Cleveland Spiders

Last MLB appearance
- August 4, 1893, for the Cleveland Spiders

MLB statistics
- Games played: 1
- At-bats: 4
- Hits: 0
- Stats at Baseball Reference

Teams
- Cleveland Spiders (1893)

Jesse Hall "Pete" Allen (May 1, 1868 – April 16, 1946) was an American professional baseball player whose career spanned two seasons, including a part of one in Major League Baseball with the Cleveland Spiders (1893). Allen played one game in the majors and went hitless four at-bats. In that game, Allen played catcher. He also played in the minor leagues with the Binghamton Bingoes (1893) and the New Castle, Pennsylvania baseball team (1895). During Allen's time in the minors, he played catcher and outfielder. After his baseball career was over, Allen enrolled in the University of Pennsylvania School of Medicine where he graduated in 1897. Soon after, Allen began practicing medicine, specializing in proctology.

== Childhood ==
Allen was born on May 1, 1868, in Columbiana, Ohio.

== Amateur career ==
Allen enrolled in the Ohio State University veterinary program in the fall of 1887. While at the university he help revive the Ohio State varsity baseball team, which had not competed in intercollegiate competition since 1884. In the spring of 1888 he served as the team's captain, manager, and starting pitcher. In the spring of 1889 he remained the team's captain and moved himself to catcher. He received his degree from the university's two-year veterinary program that same year.

In 1892, Allen enrolled at Amherst College, which he attended from 1892 to 1893. Allen became the first attendee of either Ohio State or Amherst to play in Major League Baseball, making his debut in 1893.

After his professional baseball career was over, Allen attended the University of Pennsylvania School of Medicine where he coached the Penn Quakers baseball team in 1896 and 1897. Allen was also the Penn Quakers men's basketball coach in 1897.

== Professional career ==
Allen began his professional baseball career in 1893 with the minor league Binghamton Bingoes. Allen batted .229 with five runs, 11 hits, two doubles and one triple in 12 games with the Bingoes. On defense, Allen played catcher and outfielder. On August 4, 1893, Allen played his only game in Major League Baseball with the Cleveland Spiders. In that game, Allen had no hits in four at-bats. On defense, he played catcher and made one putout. In Reed Browning's book Cy Young: A Baseball Life, Browning stated that the Spiders signed Allen out of desperation. In 1895, Allen spent his final season in professional baseball with the minor league New Castle, Pennsylvania baseball team.

== Later life ==
In 1896, Allen enrolled in the University of Pennsylvania School of Medicine. He graduated from that school in 1897. After graduation, Allen started practicing medicine. He specialized in proctology and was a member of the American Proctology Society, the American Medical Association and the Philadelphia County Medical Association. Allen wrote many articles for the American Proctology Society. Allen later became the assistant professor of proctology at Jefferson Medical College. Allen served as a staff member for Broad Street Hospital and Methodist Hospital. He died on April 16, 1946, of cerebral vascular disease at Thomas Jefferson University Hospital in Philadelphia, Pennsylvania.
