= Gus Yost =

American baseball player

- Pitcher
- Born: unknown
- Died: unknown
- Batted: Unknown Threw: Unknown

MLB debut
- June 12, 1893, for the Chicago Colts

Last MLB appearance
- June 12, 1893, for the Chicago Colts

MLB statistics
- Win–loss record: 0–1
- Earned run average: 13.50
- Strikeouts: 1
- Stats at Baseball Reference

Teams
- Chicago Colts (1893)

August Yost (fl. 1893) was an American professional baseball pitcher. He appeared in one game in Major League Baseball the Chicago Colts on June 12, 1893. He pitched 2.2 innings, facing 19 batters and taking the loss.
