= Frank Boyd =

American baseball player (1868–1937)

- Catcher
- Born: April 2, 1868; West Middletown, Pennsylvania, U.S.
- Died: December 16, 1937 (aged 69); Oil City, Pennsylvania, U.S.
- Batted: Right Threw: Right

MLB debut
- May 18, 1893, for the Cleveland Spiders

Last MLB appearance
- May 19, 1893, for the Cleveland Spiders

MLB statistics
- Batting average: .200
- Home runs: 0
- Runs batted in: 3
- Stats at Baseball Reference

Teams
- Cleveland Spiders (1893)

Frank Jay Boyd (April 2, 1868 – December 16, 1937) was an American professional baseball catcher who played for the Cleveland Spiders of the National League in May, 1893. His minor league career lasted through 1901.

Boyd died at his home at the age of 69 after battling illness for 18 months.
