= Bill Quarles =

American baseball player (1869–1897)

- Pitcher
- Born: June 25, 1870; Petersburg, Virginia, U.S.
- Died: March 25, 1897 (aged 27); Petersburg, Virginia, U.S.
- Batted: Unknown Threw: Unknown

MLB debut
- May 21, 1891, for the Washington Statesmen

Last MLB appearance
- September 9, 1893, for the Boston Beaneaters

MLB statistics
- Win–loss record: 3-2
- Strikeouts: 16
- Earned run average: 6.24
- Stats at Baseball Reference

Teams
- Washington Statesmen (1891); Boston Beaneaters (1893)

William H. Quarles (June 25, 1870 – March 25, 1897) was an American pitcher in Major League Baseball for the 1891 Washington Statesmen and 1893 Boston Beaneaters.
