= Jim Long (baseball) =

American baseball player (1862–1932)

- Outfielder
- Born: November 15, 1862; Louisville, Kentucky, U.S.
- Died: December 12, 1932 (aged 70); Louisville, Kentucky, U.S.
- Batted: Unknown Threw: Unknown

MLB debut
- August 9, 1891, for the Louisville Colonels

Last MLB appearance
- August 30, 1893, for the Baltimore Orioles

MLB statistics
- Batting Average: .215
- Home Runs: 2
- RBI: 29
- Stats at Baseball Reference

Teams
- Louisville Colonels (1891); Baltimore Orioles (1893)

James M. Long (born November 15, 1862, in Louisville, Kentucky – December 12, 1932 in Louisville, Kentucky), was an American professional baseball player who played outfield in the Major Leagues from 1891 to 1893. He played for the Baltimore Orioles and Louisville Colonels.
