= John Graff =

American baseball player (1866–1932)

- Pitcher
- Born: November 1866; Washington, D.C., U.S.
- Died: April 2, 1932 (aged 65); Washington, D.C., U.S.
- Batted: Unknown Threw: Unknown

MLB debut
- July 19, 1893, for the Washington Senators

Last MLB appearance
- July 21, 1893, for the Washington Senators

MLB statistics
- Win–loss record: 0–1
- Earned run average: 11.25
- Strikeouts: 4
- Stats at Baseball Reference

Teams
- Washington Senators (1893)

John J. Graff (November 1866 – April 2, 1932) was an American pitcher in Major League Baseball. He played for the Washington Senators in 1893.
