= Sam Gillen =

American baseball player (1867–1905)

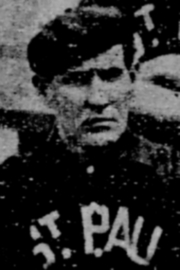
- Gillen with the St. Paul Saints
- Shortstop
- Born: November 14, 1867; Pittsburgh, Pennsylvania, U.S.
- Died: May 13, 1905 (aged 37); Allegheny, Pennsylvania, U.S.
- Batted: Unknown Threw: Unknown

MLB debut
- August 19, 1893, for the Pittsburgh Pirates

Last MLB appearance
- August 5, 1897, for the Philadelphia Phillies

MLB statistics
- Batting average: .254
- Hits: 70
- Runs batted in: 27
- Stats at Baseball Reference

Teams
- Pittsburgh Pirates (1893); Philadelphia Phillies (1897)

Samuel Gillen (November 4, 1867 – May 13, 1905) is an American former professional baseball infielder who played shortstop in the major leagues for the 1893 Pittsburgh Pirates and 1897 Philadelphia Phillies.

== Early years ==
Gillen was born in 1867 in Pittsburgh. His birth name was Samuel Gilleland. He adopted the name Gillen when he began his baseball career.

== Professional baseball career ==
Gillen began playing professional baseball in 1890 with Erie in the New York-Pennsylvania League. From 1891 to 1893, he continued to play in the minor leagues, for the Davenport Pilgrims and teams in Elmira, New York, Macon, Georgia, and Quincy, Illinois.

In 1893, he compiled a .343 batting average in 321 at bats for Macon. His strong performance in Macon drew the attention of the Pittsburgh Pirates. He made his major league debut in August 1893, appearing in three games with the Pirates. He had no hits in six at bats.

Gillen returned to the minor leagues, playing for the Wilkes-Barre Coal Barons in 1894 and the Detroit Tigers in 1895 and 1896. He had some of his best seasons at Detroit. He had a career-high .344 batting average in 471 at bats for Detroit during the 1895 season.

After a strong showing in Detroit, Gillen was drafted by the Philadelphia Phillies for the 1897 season. As the close of spring training in 1897, The Philadelphia Inquirer wrote: "Gillen has demonstrated in many hard and trying plays that he is a natural infielder -- an artist of the first water. He covers his ground, walks and throws almost precisely similar to Tommy Corcoran. He shows greater speed in handling hard grounders each game and his throwing improves as well." He appeared in 75 games for the 1897 Phillies, 69 of those games as the team's shortstop. He compiled a .259 batting average but also drew 35 bases on balls to boost his on-base percentage to .353.

In July 1897, Gillen was traded by the Phillies to the St. Paul Saints in exchange for Frank Shugart. He played for St. Paul in the last part of the 1897 season and throughout the 1898 season. Prior to the 1899 season, Gillen was traded by St. Paul to the Columbus Buckeyes with George Cross for Dan Lally. He played for Columbus for part of the 1899 season before being released. He signed in July 1899 with the Fort Wayne Indians. The Indianapolis News announced his arrival: "Sammy Gillen once touted as the fastest infielder in the Western league, and always, in the old days, a consistent hitter, has gone down the line until he has finally landed in Fort Wayne."

Gillen concluded his professional baseball career at the end of the 1899 season. Over the 10-year course of his career, Gillen appeared in at least 755 professional baseball games and totaled at least 513 runs scored, 795 hits, 202 extra base hits, and 105 stolen bases.

== Later years ==
In May 1905, Gillen died suddenly from pneumonia at his parents' home in Allegheny, Pennsylvania. He was 37 years old.
