= Art Twineham =

American baseball player (1866–1905)

- Catcher
- Born: November 26, 1866; Galesburg, Illinois, U.S.
- Died: February 3, 1905 (aged 38); Shanghai, China
- Batted: Left Threw: Left

MLB debut
- September 11, 1893, for the St. Louis Browns

Last MLB appearance
- September 30, 1894, for the St. Louis Browns

MLB statistics
- Batting average: .314
- Home runs: 1
- Runs batted in: 27
- Stats at Baseball Reference

Teams
- St. Louis Browns (1893–1894)

Arthur S. "Old Hoss" Twineham (November 26, 1866 – February 3, 1905) was an American Major League Baseball catcher. Twineham played for St. Louis Browns in 1893 and 1894.

As of September 2024, he is the only Major League Baseball player known to have died in China.
