= Edgar McNabb =

American baseball player (1865–1894)

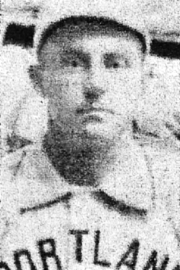
- Pitcher
- Born: October 24, 1865; Coshocton, Ohio
- Died: February 28, 1894 (aged 28); Pittsburgh, Pennsylvania
- Batted: Right Threw: Right

MLB debut
- May 12, 1893, for the Baltimore Orioles

Last MLB appearance
- August 11, 1893, for the Baltimore Orioles

MLB statistics
- Win–loss record: 8–7
- Innings pitched: 142
- Earned run average: 4.12
- Stats at Baseball Reference

Teams
- Baltimore Orioles (1893)

Edgar J. McNabb (October 24, 1865 – February 28, 1894), nicknamed "Pete" or "Texas," was an American right-handed pitcher for the 1893 Baltimore Orioles. After one season in Major League Baseball, he committed suicide after shooting his girlfriend.

His girlfriend was the actress Louise Kellogg. According to a Pittsburgh Post-Gazette article, letters found in the couple's hotel room indicated that Kellogg was planning to end the relationship, having been sending McNabb money over the winter, and that the couple were nearly broke.

== Career ==
Born in Coshocton, Ohio, McNabb pitched in 21 games for the Baltimore Orioles between May 12 and August 11, 1893. He pitched 12 complete games with a win–loss record of 8–7, and a 4.12 ERA. Despite a good record with the eighth place Orioles, he was not re-signed and he joined the Western League Grand Rapids (baseball) team for the 1894 season. He had previously played for a minor league in Denver, Colorado.

== Death ==
McNabb's girlfriend of one year, Louise Kellogg (sometimes referred to as Laura Kellogg), was noted to be a "shapely" blond actress who was married to R.E. Rockwell, a Seattle ice merchant, who was also President of the Pacific Coast League and the Northwest League. McNabb and Kellogg were staying at the Eiffel Hotel in Pittsburgh, when, at approximately 8:00 p.m., witnesses heard gunshots, screaming, and scuffling coming from their room. A friend of McNabb's broke down the door of the hotel room, finding Mrs. Kellogg lying in a pool of blood, having been shot through the neck twice, and McNabb dead from a self-inflicted gunshot wound to the mouth. Kellogg was paralyzed from the waist down and died later from her injuries.

The incident was initially speculated to have resulted from a financial dispute; however, other accounts claim that McNabb accused Kellogg of being in love with another player. According to a Pittsburgh Post-Gazette article, letters found in the room indicated that Kellogg was planning to end the relationship, having been sending him money over the winter, and that the couple were nearly broke. Police surmised that an argument developed, ending in McNabb shooting Kellogg and then turning the gun on himself though due to conflicting reports in the papers, what exactly was said is still debated by researchers to this day. McNabb is interred at Mound View Cemetery in Mount Vernon, Ohio.

== See also ==
- List of baseball players who died during their careers

== Bibliography ==
- Connor, Floyd. (2006). Baseball's Most Wanted. Sterling Publishing Company, Inc. ISBN 1-57866-157-9.
- James, Bill. (2003). The New Bill James Historical Baseball Abstract. Simon and Schuster. ISBN 0-7432-2722-0.
- Podoll, Brian A. (2003). The Minor League Milwaukee Brewers, 1859–1952. McFarland. ISBN 0-7864-1455-3.
