= 1893 Pittsburgh Pirates season =

1893 Pittsburgh Pirates
- League: National League
- Ballpark: Exposition Park
- City: Allegheny, Pennsylvania
- Record: 81–48 (.628)
- League place: 2nd
- Owners: William Kerr and Phil Auten
- Managers: Al Buckenberger

The 1893 Pittsburgh (Note: Until early in the 20th century, the name of Pittsburgh was spelled both with and without the final 'h'.) Pirates season was the 12th season of the Pittsburgh Pirates franchise; their seventh season in the National League. The Pirates finished second in the National League with a record of 81 wins and 48 losses.

== Regular season ==
=== Season standings ===
National League
Team	W	L	Pct.	GB	Home	Road
Boston Beaneaters	86	43	.667	—	49‍–‍15	37‍–‍28
Pittsburgh Pirates	81	48	.628	5	54‍–‍19	27‍–‍29
Cleveland Spiders	73	55	.570	12½	47‍–‍22	26‍–‍33
Philadelphia Phillies	72	57	.558	14	43‍–‍22	29‍–‍35
New York Giants	68	64	.515	19½	49‍–‍20	19‍–‍44
Cincinnati Reds	65	63	.508	20½	37‍–‍27	28‍–‍36
Brooklyn Grooms	65	63	.508	20½	43‍–‍24	22‍–‍39
Baltimore Orioles	60	70	.462	26½	36‍–‍24	24‍–‍46
Chicago Colts	56	71	.441	29	38‍–‍34	18‍–‍37
St. Louis Browns	57	75	.432	30½	40‍–‍30	17‍–‍45
Louisville Colonels	50	75	.400	34	24‍–‍28	26‍–‍47
Washington Senators	40	89	.310	46	21‍–‍27	19‍–‍62

=== Record vs. opponents ===
1893 National League record Sources:
Team	BAL	BSN	BRO	CHI	CIN	CLE	LOU	NYG	PHI	PIT	STL	WAS
Baltimore	—	2–10	10–2	5–7	4–8	8–4	5–5	4–8	5–7	1–11	9–3	7–5
Boston	10–2	—	8–4	8–3–1	6–6	7–5	10–2	8–4	8–4	4–6–1	10–2	7–5
Brooklyn	2–10	4–8	—	7–3	4–8	5–7–1	7–5	6–6	6–5–1	8–4	8–4	8–3
Chicago	7–5	3–8–1	3–7	—	5–7	4–8	6–4	7–5	6–6	3–9	3–9	9–3
Cincinnati	8–4	6–6	8–4	7–5	—	6–5	6–6	6–6–1	1–9–1	3–9	7–5–1	7–4
Cleveland	4–8	5–7	7–5–1	8–4	5–6	—	6–3	6–6	3–9	9–3	9–3	11–1
Louisville	5–5	2–10	5–7	4–6	6–6	3–6	—	5–7–1	4–8	4–8	4–8	8–4
New York	8–4	4–8	6–6	5–7	6–6–1	6–6	7–5–1	—	7–5–1	4–8–1	8–4	7–5
Philadelphia	7–5	4–8	5–6–1	6–6	9–1–1	9–3	8–4	5–7–1	—	7–5	4–8–1	8–4
Pittsburgh	11–1	6–4–1	4–8	9–3	9–3	3–9	8–4	8–4–1	5–7	—	9–3	9–2
St. Louis	3–9	2–10	4–8	9–3	5–7–1	3–9	8–4	4–8	8–4–1	3–9	—	8–4–1
Washington	5–7	5–7	3–8	3–9	4–7	1–11	4–8	5–7	4–8	2–9	4–8–1	—

=== Roster ===
1893 Pittsburgh Pirates
Roster
Pitchers: Mark Baldwin; Tom Colcolough; Red Ehret; Hank Gastright; Ad Gumbert; Frank Killen; Adonis Terry	Catchers: Billy Earle; Connie Mack; Joe Sugden; Infielders: Jake Beckley; Lou Bierbauer; Sam Gillen; Jack Glasscock; Jim Gray; Denny Lyons; Frank Shugart	Outfielders: Patsy Donovan; Doggie Miller; Mike Smith; Jake Stenzel; George Van Haltren	Manager: Al Buckenberger

== Player stats ==
=== Batting ===
==== Starters by position ====
Note: Pos = Position; G = Games played; AB = At bats; H = Hits; Avg. = Batting average; HR = Home runs; RBI = Runs batted in

Pos	Player	G	AB	H	Avg.	HR	RBI
C	Doggie Miller	41	154	28	.182	0	17
1B	Jake Beckley	131	542	164	.303	5	106
2B	Lou Bierbauer	128	528	150	.284	4	94
SS	Jack Glasscock	66	293	100	.341	1	74
3B	Denny Lyons	131	490	150	.306	3	105
OF	George Van Haltren	124	529	179	.338	3	79
OF	Mike Smith	128	518	179	.346	7	103
OF	Patsy Donovan	113	499	158	.317	2	56

==== Other batters ====
Note: G = Games played; AB = At bats; H = Hits; Avg. = Batting average; HR = Home runs; RBI = Runs batted in

Player	G	AB	H	Avg.	HR	RBI
Jake Stenzel	60	224	81	.362	4	37
Frank Shugart	52	210	55	.262	1	32
Connie Mack	37	133	38	.286	0	15
Billy Earle	27	95	24	.253	2	15
Joe Sugden	27	92	24	.261	0	12
Jim Gray	2	9	4	.444	0	2
Sam Gillen	3	6	0	.000	0	0

=== Pitching ===
==== Starting pitchers ====
Note: G = Games pitched; IP = Innings pitched; W = Wins; L = Losses; ERA = Earned run average; SO = Strikeouts

Player	G	IP	W	L	ERA	SO
Frank Killen	55	415.0	36	14	3.64	99
Red Ehret	39	314.1	18	18	3.44	70
Adonis Terry	26	170.0	12	8	4.45	52
Ad Gumbert	22	162.2	11	7	5.15	40
Mark Baldwin	1	2.1	0	0	11.57	0

==== Other pitchers ====
Note: G = Games pitched; IP = Innings pitched; W = Wins; L = Losses; ERA = Earned run average; SO = Strikeouts

Player	G	IP	W	L	ERA	SO
Hank Gastright	9	59.0	3	1	6.25	12
Tom Colcolough	8	43.2	1	0	4.12	32
