= Sam Shaw (baseball) =

American baseball player (1863–1947)

- Pitcher
- Born: May 7, 1863; Baltimore, Maryland, U.S.
- Died: February 13, 1947 (aged 83); Upper Darby Township, Pennsylvania, U.S.
- Batted: Right Threw: Right

MLB debut
- May 3, 1888, for the Baltimore Orioles

Last MLB appearance
- June 16, 1893, for the Chicago Colts

MLB statistics
- Win–loss record: 3–4
- Earned run average: 3.91
- Strikeouts: 23
- Stats at Baseball Reference

Teams
- Baltimore Orioles (1888); Chicago Colts (1893)

Samuel E. Shaw (May 7, 1863 – February 13, 1947) was an American professional baseball player who played parts of two seasons for the Baltimore Orioles of the American Association and the Chicago Colts of the National League. He was born in Baltimore, Maryland and died in Upper Darby Township, Pennsylvania on February 13, 1947 at the age of 83.
