= George Darby (baseball) =

American baseball player (1869–1937)

- Pitcher
- Born: February 6, 1869; Kansas City, Missouri, U.S.
- Died: February 25, 1937 (aged 68); Sacramento, California, U.S.
- Batted: Left Threw: Right

MLB debut
- April 28, 1893, for the Cincinnati Reds

Last MLB appearance
- May 19, 1893, for the Cincinnati Reds

MLB statistics
- Win–loss record: 1–1
- Earned run average: 7.76
- Strikeouts: 6
- Stats at Baseball Reference

Teams
- Cincinnati Reds (1893)

George William Darby (February 5, 1869 – February 25, 1937) was an American professional baseball player. He was a pitcher for the Cincinnati Reds of the National League in 1893.

Darby pitched what would be his final Major League game on May 19, 1893. In the words of The Cincinnati Post, he was "simply slaughtered" by the Cleveland Spiders who "took kindly to his pitching." He was notified of his release within two days.

Darby continued to pitch in the minors through the 1898 season. While pitching for the Spokane team in the Pacific Northwest League in May 1898, Darby threw a perfect game.
