= 1893 Louisville Colonels season =

1893 Louisville Colonels
- League: National League
- Ballpark: Eclipse Park
- City: Louisville, Kentucky
- Record: 50–75 (.400)
- League place: 11th
- Owners: Barney Dreyfuss
- Managers: Billy Barnie

The 1893 Louisville Colonels baseball team finished with a 50–75 record, good for eleventh place in the National League.

== Regular season ==
=== Season standings ===
National League
Team	W	L	Pct.	GB	Home	Road
Boston Beaneaters	86	43	.667	—	49‍–‍15	37‍–‍28
Pittsburgh Pirates	81	48	.628	5	54‍–‍19	27‍–‍29
Cleveland Spiders	73	55	.570	12½	47‍–‍22	26‍–‍33
Philadelphia Phillies	72	57	.558	14	43‍–‍22	29‍–‍35
New York Giants	68	64	.515	19½	49‍–‍20	19‍–‍44
Cincinnati Reds	65	63	.508	20½	37‍–‍27	28‍–‍36
Brooklyn Grooms	65	63	.508	20½	43‍–‍24	22‍–‍39
Baltimore Orioles	60	70	.462	26½	36‍–‍24	24‍–‍46
Chicago Colts	56	71	.441	29	38‍–‍34	18‍–‍37
St. Louis Browns	57	75	.432	30½	40‍–‍30	17‍–‍45
Louisville Colonels	50	75	.400	34	24‍–‍28	26‍–‍47
Washington Senators	40	89	.310	46	21‍–‍27	19‍–‍62

=== Record vs. opponents ===
1893 National League record Sources:
Team	BAL	BSN	BRO	CHI	CIN	CLE	LOU	NYG	PHI	PIT	STL	WAS
Baltimore	—	2–10	10–2	5–7	4–8	8–4	5–5	4–8	5–7	1–11	9–3	7–5
Boston	10–2	—	8–4	8–3–1	6–6	7–5	10–2	8–4	8–4	4–6–1	10–2	7–5
Brooklyn	2–10	4–8	—	7–3	4–8	5–7–1	7–5	6–6	6–5–1	8–4	8–4	8–3
Chicago	7–5	3–8–1	3–7	—	5–7	4–8	6–4	7–5	6–6	3–9	3–9	9–3
Cincinnati	8–4	6–6	8–4	7–5	—	6–5	6–6	6–6–1	1–9–1	3–9	7–5–1	7–4
Cleveland	4–8	5–7	7–5–1	8–4	5–6	—	6–3	6–6	3–9	9–3	9–3	11–1
Louisville	5–5	2–10	5–7	4–6	6–6	3–6	—	5–7–1	4–8	4–8	4–8	8–4
New York	8–4	4–8	6–6	5–7	6–6–1	6–6	7–5–1	—	7–5–1	4–8–1	8–4	7–5
Philadelphia	7–5	4–8	5–6–1	6–6	9–1–1	9–3	8–4	5–7–1	—	7–5	4–8–1	8–4
Pittsburgh	11–1	6–4–1	4–8	9–3	9–3	3–9	8–4	8–4–1	5–7	—	9–3	9–2
St. Louis	3–9	2–10	4–8	9–3	5–7–1	3–9	8–4	4–8	8–4–1	3–9	—	8–4–1
Washington	5–7	5–7	3–8	3–9	4–7	1–11	4–8	5–7	4–8	2–9	4–8–1	—

=== Notable transactions ===
- June 7, 1893: Hughie Jennings and Harry Taylor were traded by the Colonels to the Baltimore Orioles for Tim O'Rourke.

=== Roster ===
1893 Louisville Colonels
Roster
Pitchers: Fritz Clausen; Billy Gumbert; George Hemming; Matt Kilroy; Con Lucid; Jock Menefee; Billy Rhines; Bill Rotes; Scott Stratton; Bill Whitrock	Catchers: Bob Clark; John Grim; Jerry Harrington; Infielders: William Brown; Jerry Denny; Hughie Jennings; Tim O'Rourke; Fred Pfeffer; George Pinkney; Lew Whistler	Outfielders: Tom Brown; Pete Browning; Larry Twitchell; Farmer Weaver; Curt Welch	Manager: Billy Barnie

== Player stats ==
=== Batting ===
==== Starters by position ====
Note: Pos = Position; G = Games played; AB = At bats; H = Hits; Avg. = Batting average; HR = Home runs; RBI = Runs batted in

Pos	Player	G	AB	H	Avg.	HR	RBI
C	John Grim	99	415	111	.267	3	54
1B	William Brown	111	461	140	.304	1	85
2B	Fred Pfeffer	125	508	129	.254	3	75
SS	Tim O'Rourke	92	352	99	.281	0	53
3B	George Pinkney	118	446	105	.235	1	62
OF	Farmer Weaver	106	439	128	.292	2	49
OF	Tom Brown	122	529	127	.240	5	54
OF	Pete Browning	57	220	78	.355	1	37

==== Other batters ====
Note: G = Games played; AB = At bats; H = Hits; Avg. = Batting average; HR = Home runs; RBI = Runs batted in

Player	G	AB	H	Avg.	HR	RBI
Larry Twitchell	45	187	58	.310	2	31
Jerry Denny	44	175	43	.246	1	22
Hughie Jennings	23	88	12	.136	0	9
Curt Welch	14	47	8	.170	0	2
Lew Whistler	13	47	10	.213	0	9
Jerry Harrington	10	36	4	.111	0	6
Bob Clark	12	28	3	.107	0	3

=== Pitching ===
==== Starting pitchers ====
Note: G = Games pitched; IP = Innings pitched; W = Wins; L = Losses; ERA = Earned run average; SO = Strikeouts

Player	G	IP	W	L	ERA	SO
George Hemming	41	332.0	18	17	5.10	79
Scott Stratton	37	314.2	12	23	5.43	43
Bill Rotes	20	151.2	5	12	7.60	22
Jock Menefee	15	129.1	8	7	4.24	30
Bill Whitrock	8	46.2	2	5	8.10	8
Matt Kilroy	5	35.0	3	2	9.00	4
Fritz Clausen	5	33.0	1	4	6.00	4
Billy Rhines	5	31.0	1	4	8.71	0
Billy Gumbert	1	0.2	0	0	27.00	0

==== Other pitchers ====
Note: G = Games pitched; IP = Innings pitched; W = Wins; L = Losses; ERA = Earned run average; SO = Strikeouts

Player	G	IP	W	L	ERA	SO
Con Lucid	2	6	0	1	15.00	0
