= Doc Wallace =

American baseball player (1893–1964)

- Shortstop
- Born: September 20, 1893; Church Hill, Maryland, U.S.
- Died: December 31, 1964 (aged 71); Haverford, Pennsylvania, U.S.
- Batted: Right Threw: Right

MLB debut
- May 2, 1919, for the Philadelphia Phillies

Last MLB appearance
- May 4, 1919, for the Philadelphia Phillies

MLB statistics
- Games played: 2
- At bats: 4
- Hits: 1
- Stats at Baseball Reference

Teams
- Philadelphia Phillies (1919)

Frederick Renshaw "Doc" Wallace (September 20, 1893 – December 31, 1964) was an American professional baseball shortstop who played for the Philadelphia Phillies of Major League Baseball in the 1919 season. He appeared in just two games in the majors, getting one hit in four at-bats. Wallace was born in Church Hill, Maryland, and attended nearby Washington College.
