= 1893 Brooklyn Grooms season =

1893 Brooklyn Grooms
- League: National League
- Ballpark: Eastern Park
- City: Brooklyn, New York
- Record: 65–63 (.508)
- Divisional place: 7th
- Owners: Charles Byrne, Ferdinand Abell, George Chauncey
- President: Charles Byrne
- Manager: Dave Foutz

The 1893 Brooklyn Grooms finished a disappointing seventh in the National League race under new player/manager Dave Foutz. The highlight of the year was when pitcher Brickyard Kennedy became the first major leaguer to pitch and win two games on the same day since the mound was moved back to 60 feet 6 inches. He allowed just eight hits in beating the Louisville Colonels 3–0 and 6–2 in a doubleheader on May 30, 1893.

== Offseason ==
- February 5, 1893: John Montgomery Ward was signed as a free agent by the Grooms.
- February 15, 1893: John Montgomery Ward was sold by the Grooms to the New York Giants for $6,000.
- February 18, 1893: Bill Joyce and cash were traded by the Grooms to the Washington Senators for Danny Richardson.

== Regular season ==
=== Season standings ===
National League
Team	W	L	Pct.	GB	Home	Road
Boston Beaneaters	86	43	.667	—	49‍–‍15	37‍–‍28
Pittsburgh Pirates	81	48	.628	5	54‍–‍19	27‍–‍29
Cleveland Spiders	73	55	.570	12½	47‍–‍22	26‍–‍33
Philadelphia Phillies	72	57	.558	14	43‍–‍22	29‍–‍35
New York Giants	68	64	.515	19½	49‍–‍20	19‍–‍44
Cincinnati Reds	65	63	.508	20½	37‍–‍27	28‍–‍36
Brooklyn Grooms	65	63	.508	20½	43‍–‍24	22‍–‍39
Baltimore Orioles	60	70	.462	26½	36‍–‍24	24‍–‍46
Chicago Colts	56	71	.441	29	38‍–‍34	18‍–‍37
St. Louis Browns	57	75	.432	30½	40‍–‍30	17‍–‍45
Louisville Colonels	50	75	.400	34	24‍–‍28	26‍–‍47
Washington Senators	40	89	.310	46	21‍–‍27	19‍–‍62

=== Record vs. opponents ===
1893 National League record Sources:
Team	BAL	BSN	BRO	CHI	CIN	CLE	LOU	NYG	PHI	PIT	STL	WAS
Baltimore	—	2–10	10–2	5–7	4–8	8–4	5–5	4–8	5–7	1–11	9–3	7–5
Boston	10–2	—	8–4	8–3–1	6–6	7–5	10–2	8–4	8–4	4–6–1	10–2	7–5
Brooklyn	2–10	4–8	—	7–3	4–8	5–7–1	7–5	6–6	6–5–1	8–4	8–4	8–3
Chicago	7–5	3–8–1	3–7	—	5–7	4–8	6–4	7–5	6–6	3–9	3–9	9–3
Cincinnati	8–4	6–6	8–4	7–5	—	6–5	6–6	6–6–1	1–9–1	3–9	7–5–1	7–4
Cleveland	4–8	5–7	7–5–1	8–4	5–6	—	6–3	6–6	3–9	9–3	9–3	11–1
Louisville	5–5	2–10	5–7	4–6	6–6	3–6	—	5–7–1	4–8	4–8	4–8	8–4
New York	8–4	4–8	6–6	5–7	6–6–1	6–6	7–5–1	—	7–5–1	4–8–1	8–4	7–5
Philadelphia	7–5	4–8	5–6–1	6–6	9–1–1	9–3	8–4	5–7–1	—	7–5	4–8–1	8–4
Pittsburgh	11–1	6–4–1	4–8	9–3	9–3	3–9	8–4	8–4–1	5–7	—	9–3	9–2
St. Louis	3–9	2–10	4–8	9–3	5–7–1	3–9	8–4	4–8	8–4–1	3–9	—	8–4–1
Washington	5–7	5–7	3–8	3–9	4–7	1–11	4–8	5–7	4–8	2–9	4–8–1	—

=== Roster ===
1893 Brooklyn Grooms
Roster
Pitchers: Ed Crane; Dan Daub; George Haddock; Brickyard Kennedy; Tom Lovett; George Sharrott; Ed Stein	Catchers: Con Daily; Tom Kinslow; Candy LaChance; Infielders: Dan Brouthers; Tommy Corcoran; Tom Daly; Gil Hatfield; Willie Keeler; Danny Richardson	Outfielders: Oyster Burns; Dave Foutz; Mike Griffin; George Shoch; Harry Stovey	Manager: Dave Foutz

=== Notable transactions ===
- July 27, 1893: Willie Keeler was purchased by the Grooms from the New York Giants.

== Player stats ==
=== Batting ===
==== Starters by position ====
Note: Pos = Position; G = Games played; AB = At bats; R = Runs; H = Hits; Avg. = Batting average; HR = Home runs; RBI = Runs batted in; SB = Stolen bases

Pos	Player	G	AB	R	H	Avg.	HR	RBI	SB
C	Tom Kinslow	78	312	38	76	.244	4	45	4
1B	Dan Brouthers	77	282	57	95	.337	2	59	9
2B	Tom Daly	126	470	94	136	.289	8	70	32
3B	George Shoch	94	327	53	86	.263	2	54	9
SS	Tommy Corcoran	115	459	61	126	.275	2	58	14
OF	Oyster Burns	109	415	68	112	.270	7	60	14
OF	Mike Griffin	95	362	85	103	.285	6	59	30
OF	Dave Foutz	130	557	91	137	.246	7	67	39

==== Other batters ====
Note: G = Games played; AB = At bats; R = Runs; H = Hits; Avg. = Batting average; HR = Home runs; RBI = Runs batted in; SB = Stolen bases

Player	G	AB	R	H	Avg.	HR	RBI	SB
Con Daily	61	215	33	57	.265	1	32	13
Danny Richardson	54	206	36	46	.223	0	27	7
Harry Stovey	48	175	43	44	.251	1	29	22
Gil Hatfield	34	120	24	35	.292	2	19	9
Willie Keeler	20	80	14	25	.313	1	9	2
Candy LaChance	11	35	1	6	.171	0	6	0

=== Pitching ===
==== Starting pitchers ====
Note: G = Games pitched; GS = Games started; IP = Innings pitched; W = Wins; L = Losses; ERA = Earned run average; BB = Bases on balls; SO = Strikeouts; CG = Complete games

Player	G	GS	IP	W	L	ERA	BB	SO	CG
Brickyard Kennedy	46	44	382.7	25	20	3.72	168	107	40
Ed Stein	37	34	298.3	19	15	3.77	119	81	28
George Haddock	23	20	151.0	8	9	5.60	89	37	12
Dan Daub	12	12	103.0	6	6	3.84	61	25	12
George Sharrott	13	10	95.0	4	6	5.87	58	24	10
Ed Crane	2	2	10.0	0	2	13.50	9	5	1

==== Other pitchers ====
Note: G = Games pitched; GS = Games started; IP = Innings pitched; W = Wins; L = Losses; ERA = Earned run average; BB = Bases on balls; SO = Strikeouts; CG = Complete games

Player	G	GS	IP	W	L	ERA	BB	SO	CG
Tom Lovett	14	8	96.0	3	5	6.56	35	15	6

==== Relief pitchers ====
Note: G = Games pitched; IP = Innings pitched; W = Wins; L = Losses; SV = Saves; ERA = Earned run average; BB = Bases on balls; SO = Strikeouts

Player	G	IP	W	L	SV	ERA	BB	SO
Dave Foutz	6	18.0	0	0	0	7.50	8	3
