= Steve Brodie (baseball) =

American baseball player (1868–1935)

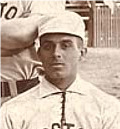
- Brodie in 1890
- Center fielder
- Born: September 11, 1868; Warrenton, Virginia, U.S.
- Died: October 30, 1935 (aged 67); Baltimore, Maryland, U.S.
- Batted: Left Threw: Right

MLB debut
- April 21, 1890, for the Boston Beaneaters

Last MLB appearance
- October 4, 1902, for the New York Giants

MLB statistics
- Batting average: .303
- Home runs: 25
- Runs batted in: 900
- Stats at Baseball Reference

Teams
- Boston Beaneaters (1890–1891); St. Louis Browns (1892–1893); Baltimore Orioles (NL) (1893–1896); Pittsburgh Pirates (1897); Baltimore Orioles (NL) (1898–1899); Baltimore Orioles (AL) (1901); New York Giants (1902)

Career highlights and awards
- 4× National League pennant: 1891, 1894, 1895, 1896

Walter Scott "Steve" Brodie (September 11, 1868 – October 30, 1935) was an American professional baseball center fielder. He played in Major League Baseball from 1890 to 1902 for the Boston Beaneaters, St. Louis Browns, Baltimore Orioles (NL), Pittsburgh Pirates, Baltimore Orioles (AL), and New York Giants. Brodie set a 19th-century record by playing in 727 consecutive games. In the mid-1890s, along with Willie Keeler and Joe Kelley, he was part of one of the best outfields of his era.

== Early life ==
Brodie was the son of Irish immigrant Alexander Brodie, a tailor and a Shakespearean actor. In 1887, Brodie moved to Roanoke, Virginia, where he played in the semiprofessional industrial leagues. That same year, Brodie, 18, met Carrie Henry, 15, and they got married. The couple lived in Roanoke through Brodie's baseball playing career.

== Baseball career ==
Brodie took on the nickname Steve because of the daredevil of the same name, who was said to have survived a jump off of the Brooklyn Bridge. The ballplaying Brodie broke into the major leagues with the Boston Beaneaters in 1890; NL teams sought a high volume of new players that year because they had lost players who jumped to the new Players' League. In 1891, Brodie began a 727-game streak of consecutive games played, the longest such streak in the 19th century.

Brodie spent several years in the outfield with the Baltimore Orioles of the 1890s. His teammates in the outfield were two future Baseball Hall of Fame members, Willie Keeler and Joe Kelley, giving the Orioles one of the best outfields of the 19th century.

On the baseball field, Brodie was known as a jokester with an eccentric personality. Teammates and fans were sometimes taken aback when he recited Shakespearean verse during games or carried on conversations with himself in the outfield.

In 1438 games over 12 seasons, Brodie posted a .303 batting average (1728-for-5703) with 886 runs, 191 doubles, 89 triples, 25 home runs, 900 runs batted in, 289 stolen bases, 420 bases on balls, .365 on-base percentage, and .381 slugging percentage. He recorded a .958 fielding percentage primarily as an outfielder but also played several games at second and third base.

== Later life ==
When the Federal League emerged as a third major league, Brodie became a scout for the Baltimore Terrapins. The YMCA sent him to France to facilitate recreation programs for U.S. soldiers in World War I. He later served as an administrator at Baltimore's Municipal Stadium. Brodie died in 1935 and was interred at Woodlawn Cemetery in Baltimore County.

== See also ==
- List of Major League Baseball single-game hits leaders
