= Lem Cross =

American baseball player (1872–1930)

- Pitcher
- Born: January 9, 1872; Sanbornton, New Hampshire, U.S.
- Died: October 9, 1930 (aged 58); Manchester, New Hampshire, U.S.
- Batted: Unknown Threw: Right

MLB debut
- August 6, 1893, for the Cincinnati Reds

Last MLB appearance
- August 6, 1894, for the Cincinnati Reds

MLB statistics
- Win–loss record: 3–6
- Earned run average: 7.66
- Strikeouts: 18
- Stats at Baseball Reference

Teams
- Cincinnati Reds (1893–1894)

George Lewis Cross (January 9, 1872 – October 9, 1930) was an American professional baseball player. He was a pitcher for the Cincinnati Reds of the National League in 1893 and 1894. He played in the minors through 1900, mostly in the Western League.
