= Dennis O'Neill (baseball) =

American baseball player (1866–1912)

- First baseman
- Born: November 22, 1866; Holyoke, Massachusetts, U.S.
- Died: November 15, 1912 (aged 45); Rushville, Indiana, U.S.
- Batted: Unknown Threw: Left

MLB debut
- June 18, 1893, for the St. Louis Browns

Last MLB appearance
- July 26, 1893, for the St. Louis Browns

MLB statistics
- Batting average: .120
- Home runs: 0
- Runs batted in: 2
- Stats at Baseball Reference

Teams
- St. Louis Browns (1893)

Dennis O'Neill (November 22, 1866 – November 15, 1912) was an American Major League Baseball player. He played for the St. Louis Browns in June, 1893.
