= Tom Williams (outfielder/pitcher) =

American baseball player (1870–1940)

- Pitcher / Outfielder
- Born: August 19, 1870; Minersville, Ohio, U.S.
- Died: July 27, 1940 (aged 69); Columbus, Ohio, U.S.
- Batted: Unknown Threw: Unknown

MLB debut
- May 1, 1892, for the Cleveland Spiders

Last MLB appearance
- September 14, 1893, for the Cleveland Spiders

MLB statistics
- Win–loss record: 2–1
- Earned run average: 4.36
- Strikeouts: 9
- Stats at Baseball Reference

Teams
- Cleveland Spiders (1892)

Thomas C. Williams (August 19, 1870 – July 27, 1940) was a 19th-century American Major League Baseball player who played as both outfielder and pitcher.
