= Sam White (baseball) =

English baseball player (1893–1929)

- Catcher
- Born: August 23, 1893; Kinsley, England
- Died: November 11, 1929 (aged 36); Philadelphia
- Batted: Left Threw: Right

MLB debut
- September 8, 1919, for the Boston Braves

Last MLB appearance
- September 8, 1919, for the Boston Braves

MLB statistics
- Games: 1
- At bats: 1
- Hits: 0
- Stats at Baseball Reference

Teams
- Boston Braves (1919)

Samuel Lambeth White (August 23, 1893 – November 11, 1929) was an English born Major League Baseball player. White played in only one game, for the Boston Braves in the 1919 season; he went 0 for 1. He batted left-handed and threw right-handed.

White was born in Kinsley, England, and died in Philadelphia, Pennsylvania, where he was interred in Cedar Hill Cemetery.
