= Gus McGinnis =

American baseball player (1870–1904)

- Pitcher
- Born: August 1870; Barnesville, Ohio, U.S.
- Died: April 20, 1904 (aged 33); Barnesville, Ohio, U.S.
- Batted: Unknown Threw: Left

MLB debut
- April 27, 1893, for the Chicago Colts

Last MLB appearance
- September 26, 1893, for the Philadelphia Phillies

MLB statistics
- Win–loss record: 3–8
- Earned run average: 4.99
- Strikeouts: 25
- Stats at Baseball Reference

Teams
- Chicago Colts (1893); Philadelphia Phillies (1893)

Gus McGinnis (August, 1870 – April 20, 1904) was an American pitcher in Major League Baseball. He played for the Chicago Colts and Philadelphia Phillies.
