= 1893 in baseball =

The following are the baseball events of the year 1893 throughout the world.

== Champions ==
- National League: Boston Beaneaters

== Statistical leaders ==
National League
Stat	Player	Total
AVG	Billy Hamilton (PHI)	.380
HR	Ed Delahanty (PHI)	19
RBI	Ed Delahanty (PHI)	146
W	Frank Killen (PIT)	36
ERA	Theodore Breitenstein (STL)	3.18
K	Amos Rusie (NYG)	208

== National League final standings ==
National League
Team	W	L	Pct.	GB	Home	Road
Boston Beaneaters	86	43	.667	—	49‍–‍15	37‍–‍28
Pittsburgh Pirates	81	48	.628	5	54‍–‍19	27‍–‍29
Cleveland Spiders	73	55	.570	12½	47‍–‍22	26‍–‍33
Philadelphia Phillies	72	57	.558	14	43‍–‍22	29‍–‍35
New York Giants	68	64	.515	19½	49‍–‍20	19‍–‍44
Cincinnati Reds	65	63	.508	20½	37‍–‍27	28‍–‍36
Brooklyn Grooms	65	63	.508	20½	43‍–‍24	22‍–‍39
Baltimore Orioles	60	70	.462	26½	36‍–‍24	24‍–‍46
Chicago Colts	56	71	.441	29	38‍–‍34	18‍–‍37
St. Louis Browns	57	75	.432	30½	40‍–‍30	17‍–‍45
Louisville Colonels	50	75	.400	34	24‍–‍28	26‍–‍47
Washington Senators	40	89	.310	46	21‍–‍27	19‍–‍62

Locations of teams for the 1893–1895 National League seasons
National League

== Notable seasons ==
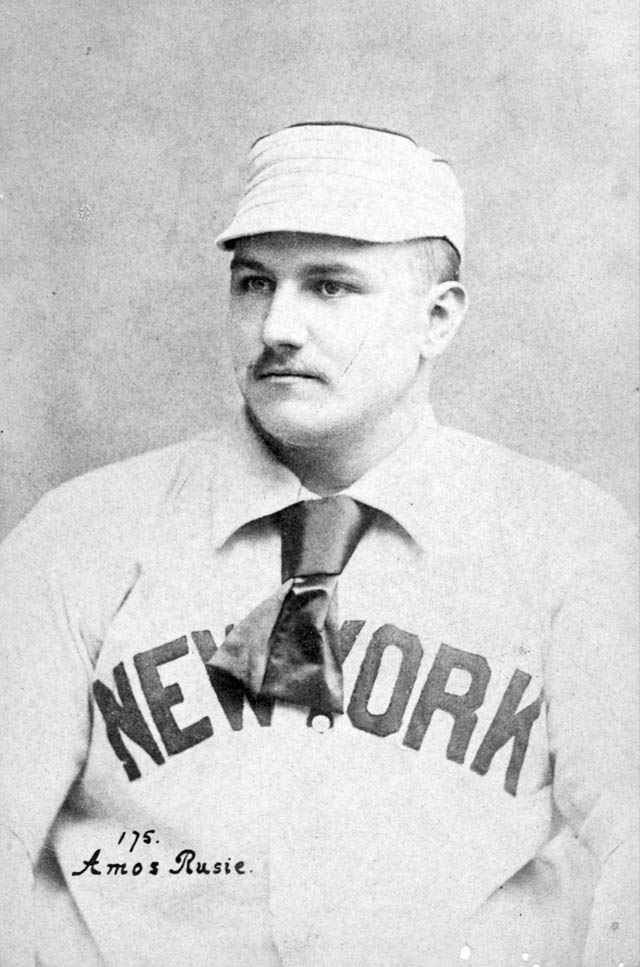
Amos Rusie

- Philadelphia Phillies left fielder Ed Delahanty led the NL in home runs (19), runs batted in (146), total bases (347), and slugging percentage (.583). He was second in the NL in hits (219) and adjusted OPS+ (164). He was third in the NL in batting average (.368) and runs scored (145).
- New York Giants pitcher Amos Rusie had a win–loss record of 33–21 and led the NL in innings pitched (482), strikeouts (208), and shutouts (4). He was second in the NL in earned run average (3.23). He was third in the NL in wins (33) and adjusted ERA+ (143).

== Events ==
- June 19 – Baltimore Orioles outfielder Piggy Ward reached base a record 17 times in 17 consecutive plate appearances, a streak he started on June 16. The record would be matched 69 years later, when catcher Earl Averill, Jr. tied that mark in 1962.
- August 16 – Bill Hawke of the Baltimore Orioles pitches a no-hitter against the Washington Senators in a 5–0 win. It is the first no-hitter thrown from the modern-day pitching distance of 60 ft 6 in (18.44 m).
- August 19 – The Pittsburgh Pirates set a Major League record which still stands for the most batters hit by a pitch in an inning. Pitchers Red Ehret and Adonis Terry hit four batters in the 2nd inning against the Boston Beaneaters, hitting Charlie Ganzel, Herman Long, Bobby Lowe, and Tommy Tucker.
- November 21 – Ban Johnson is named president, secretary, and treasurer of the recently reorganized Western League. Under Johnson's leadership the WL will prosper.

== Births ==
=== January ===
- January 1 – Frank Fuller
- January 2 – Jesse Altenburg
- January 3 – George Shively
- January 10
  - Joe Gingras
  - Marty Herrmann
- January 12
  - Lefty Lorenzen
  - Charlie Young
- January 14 – Billy Meyer
- January 17 – Luke Glavenich
- January 20
  - Al Gould
  - Cliff Hill
- January 25 – Abe Bowman
- January 28 – Guy Cooper
- January 30 – Red Smyth
- January 31 – George Burns

=== February ===
- February 2 – Cy Warmoth
- February 7 – Charlie Jamieson
- February 10 – Bill Evans
- February 12 – Earl Sheely
- February 13 – Ben Dyer
- February 17
  - Eddie Onslow
  - Wally Pipp
- February 21
  - Norman Plitt
  - Marsh Williams
- February 23 – Jim O'Neill
- February 25 – Phil Slattery
- February 28 – Sam Mayer

=== March ===
- March 8 – Ray Francis
- March 9
  - Billy Southworth
  - Lefty Williams
- March 12
  - Joe Engel
  - Alex Gaston
- March 18 – Russ Wrightstone
- March 20 – Johnny Butler
- March 23 – Ray Kremer
- March 24 – George Sisler
- March 26 – Frank Brower
- March 27 – Charlie Boardman

=== April ===
- April 4 – Pete Kilduff
- April 7
  - Desmond Beatty
  - Fletcher Low
- April 9
  - Bill Morrell
  - Tiny Osborne
- April 10 – Walter Ancker
- April 11
  - Hal Deviney
  - Spencer Pumpelly
- April 13 – Roy Walker
- April 14 – Ben Tincup
- April 15
  - Vern Hughes
  - Jack Sheehan
- April 24 – Walt Smallwood
- April 27 – Allen Sothoron
- April 29 – Shag Thompson

=== May ===
- May 6 – Pat Griffin
- May 7 – Bill Hobbs
- May 8
  - Ed Hemingway
  - Edd Roush
  - Roy Wilkinson
- May 9 – Bill Bolden
- May 12
  - Hob Hiller
  - George Kaiserling
- May 15 – Sam Fishburn
- May 20
  - Walter Bernhardt
  - Fritz Von Kolnitz
- May 21 – Herold Juul
- May 22 – Pat Parker
- May 23 – Elmer Leifer
- May 25 – Bill Bankston

=== June ===
- June 1
  - Guy Morton
  - Eddie Palmer
- June 5 – Herb Hall
- June 9
  - Irish Meusel
  - Mack Wheat
- June 18 – Ben Shaw
- June 22 – Larry Pezold
- June 26 – Elmer Ponder
- June 27 – Charlie Wheatley

=== July ===
- July 1 – Howie Camp
- July 3 – Dickey Kerr
- July 6 – Shovel Hodge
- July 7 – Dutch Wetzel
- July 8
  - Bill Brown
  - Dan Woodman
- July 9
  - Turner Barber
  - Harry Eccles
  - Tony Faeth
- July 11
  - Clarence Blethen
  - Milt Stock
- July 13 – Luther Farrell
- July 14 – John Peters
- July 15 – Red Oldham
- July 16 – Doc Prothro
- July 21 – Ray Keating
- July 22 – Jesse Haines
- July 24 – Joe Schultz
- July 31 – Allen Russell

=== August ===
- August 5 – Jack Harper
- August 8 – Jack Smith
- August 11 – Red Causey
- August 12 – John Michaelson
- August 16 – Cy Wright
- August 18
  - Bernie Duffy
  - Burleigh Grimes
  - William Marriott
- August 19 – Jim Shaw
- August 22
  - Lyle Bigbee
  - Oscar Fuhr
- August 23 – Sam White
- August 24
  - Paul Des Jardien
  - Bartolo Portuondo
- August 25 – Bob Gandy
- August 27
  - Howie Haworth
  - Dizzy Nutter
- August 30 – Ralph Head
- August 31 – Murphy Currie

=== September ===
- September 5 – Don Rader
- September 6 – Bill Murray
- September 9 – Walt Kinney
- September 11
  - Ray Grimes
  - Roy Grimes
- September 13
  - John Kelleher
  - Mike McNally
  - Dutch Ruether
- September 15 – Speed Martin
- September 17 – Whitey Glazner
- September 20
  - Jack Bradley
  - Doc Wallace
- September 22
  - Ira Flagstead
  - Pat French
- September 25 – Ed Chaplin
- September 28
  - Mike Massey
  - Cy Rheam
- September 30 – Duke Kelleher

=== October ===
- October 5 – Paul Speraw
- October 6
  - Pat Duncan
  - Johnny Tillman
- October 12 – Hank Ritter
- October 13
  - Pickles Dillhoefer
  - Dick Spalding
- October 15
  - John Karst
  - Gil Whitehouse
- October 19 – Lloyd Christenbury
- October 25 – Vic Aldridge
- October 31 – Bill Herring

=== November ===
- November 1
  - Tom Burr
  - Otis Lawry
- November 4 – Bill Leinhauser
- November 5 – Spencer Heath
- November 6 – Dana Fillingim
- November 15 – Joe Leonard
- November 16 – Cristóbal Torriente
- November 21 – Ziggy Hasbrook
- November 25 – Gene Bailey
- November 28
  - Benn Karr
  - Frank O'Rourke
- November 29
  - Carter Elliott
  - Charlie Snell
- November 30 – Tex Hoffman

=== December ===
- December 2 – Tommy Vereker
- December 4 – Luke Nelson
- December 5 – Joe Gedeon
- December 6 – Hack Eibel
- December 12 – Les Hennessy
- December 17 – Bert Yeabsley
- December 18
  - Dominic Mulrenan
  - Rinaldo Williams
- December 19 – Paul Strand
- December 22
  - Marty Becker
  - Jesse Winters
- December 29 – Joe Smith

== Deaths ==
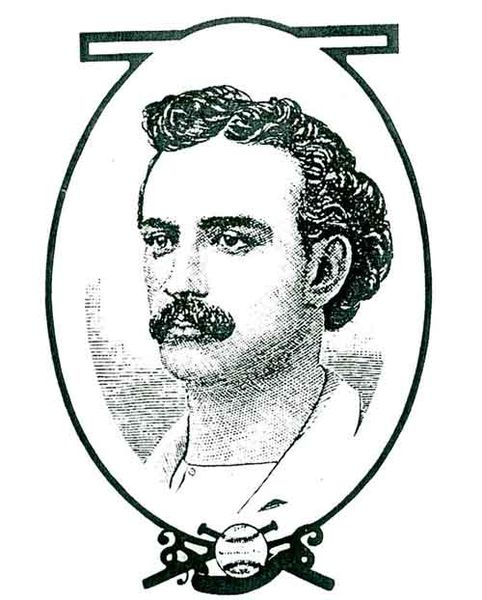
Lip Pike

- January 4 – Jim Halpin, 29, shortstop in 1882, and 1884–1885.
- March – Joseph Quinn, 36, catcher for two teams in 1881.
- April 18 – Fred Siefke, 23, third baseman for the 1890 Brooklyn Gladiators.
- October 10 – Lip Pike, 48, outfielder for several teams from 1871 to 1881 who batted .300 four times in the National Association and twice in the NL, winning four home run titles; the sport's first Jewish star.
- December 2 – Bill Gleason, 25, pitcher for the 1890 Cleveland Infants.
