= Abe Johnson =

American baseball player

- Pitcher
- Born: Unknown; Chicago
- Died: Unknown
- Batted: Unknown Threw: Unknown

MLB debut
- July 16, 1893, for the Chicago Colts

Last MLB appearance
- July 16, 1893, for the Chicago Colts

MLB statistics
- Win–loss record: 0-0
- Earned run average: 36.00
- Strikeouts: 0
- Stats at Baseball Reference

Teams
- Chicago Colts (1893)

Abraham Johnson was a professional baseball player. He was a pitcher for the Chicago Colts of the National League. He played in one game for the Colts on July 16, 1893.
