= Tom Colcolough =

American baseball player (1870–1919)

- Pitcher
- Born: October 8, 1870; Charleston, South Carolina, U.S.
- Died: December 10, 1919 (aged 49); Charleston, South Carolina, U.S.
- Batted: Right Threw: Right

MLB debut
- August 1, 1893, for the Pittsburgh Pirates

Last MLB appearance
- July 16, 1899, for the New York Giants

MLB statistics
- Win–loss record: 14–11
- Earned run average: 5.67
- Strikeouts: 65
- Stats at Baseball Reference

Teams
- Pittsburgh Pirates (1893–1895); New York Giants (1899)

Thomas Bernard Colcolough (October 8, 1870 – December 10, 1919) was an American professional baseball player. He was a right-handed pitcher over parts of four seasons (1893–1895, 1899) with the Pittsburgh Pirates and New York Giants. For his career, he compiled a 14–11 record in 47 appearances, with a 5.67 earned run average and 65 strikeouts.

Colcolough was born and later died in Charleston, South Carolina at the age of 49.

== See also ==
- List of Major League Baseball annual saves leaders
