= Jud Smith =

American baseball player (1869–1947)

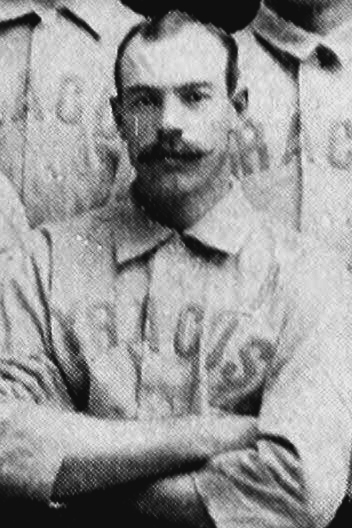
- Third baseman
- Born: January 13, 1869; Green Oak, Michigan, U.S.
- Died: December 7, 1947 (aged 78); Los Angeles, California, U.S.
- Batted: Right Threw: Right

MLB debut
- May 21, 1893, for the Cincinnati Reds

Last MLB appearance
- September 15, 1901, for the Pittsburgh Pirates

MLB statistics
- Batting average: .280
- Home runs: 4
- Runs batted in: 37
- Stats at Baseball Reference

Teams
- Cincinnati Reds (1893); St. Louis Browns (1893); Pittsburgh Pirates (1896); Washington Senators (1898); Pittsburgh Pirates (1901)

Grant Judson Smith (January 13, 1869 – December 7, 1947) was an American professional baseball player. He played all or part of four seasons in Major League Baseball for the Cincinnati Reds (1893), St. Louis Browns (1893), Pittsburgh Pirates (1896 and 1901) and Washington Senators (1898), primarily as a third baseman.

Smith, who was born in Green Oak, Michigan, was a member of the Pirates team that won the 1901 National League pennant.

In 4 seasons he played in 103 games and had 346 at bats, 48 runs, 97 hits, 11 doubles, 6 triples, 4 home runs, 37 RBI, 15 stolen bases, 37 walks, .280 batting average, .363 on-base percentage, .382 slugging percentage and 132 total bases.

He went to college at Ohio State University.

He died in Los Angeles at the age of 78.

== Sources ==
- Career statistics from Baseball Reference · Baseball Reference (Minors) · Retrosheet · Baseball Almanac
