= 1893 Major League Baseball season =

1893 MLB season
- League: National League (NL)
- Sport: Baseball
- Duration: April 27 – September 30, 1893
- Games: 132
- Teams: 12

Pennant winner
- NL champions: Boston Beaneaters
- NL runners-up: Pittsburgh Pirates

MLB seasons
- ← 1892 1894 →

Locations of teams for the 1893–1895 National League seasons
National League

The 1893 major league baseball season began on April 27, 1893. The regular season ended on September 30, with the Boston Beaneaters as the pennant winner of the National League and therefore winner of the final Dauvray Cup.

The 1893 season saw no postseason championship series, unlike the split-season 1892 World's Championship Series. This would not last, as the following season would see the Temple Cup, which would be a championship series between the NL pennant winner and the runner-up.

== Schedule ==
The 1893 schedule consisted of 132 games for the twelve teams of the National League. Each team was scheduled to play 12 games against the other eleven teams in the league. This replaced the 154-game, 14-games-each format put in place in the previous season and would be used until 1898.

Opening Day took place on April 27 featuring eight teams. The final day of the season was on September 30, featuring six teams.

== Rule changes ==
The 1893 season saw the following rule changes:

- In place of a pitcher's box, a pitcher's plate at a size of 12 inches by 4 inches was instituted.
- Per new Rule 27, prior to throwing a pitch, a pitcher must keep their rear foot on the plate through coming set and the windup.
- The pitcher's plate was moved back from 50 feet from home plate to 60 feet 6 inches.
- Changes were made to baseball bats, as described in new Rule 13, stating: "the bat must be made round and of hardwood and may have twine on the handle or granulated substance applied not to exceed 18 inches from the end. No bat shall exceed 42 inches in length."
  - This rescinded the 1885 rule allowing flat bats, reinstating the 1857 rule requiring round bats.
  - Softwoods, like pine, and bats that were sawed off at the end were banned.
- The balk rule was clarified to state that motions to deceive a baserunner would be declared a balk, but "when the pitcher feigns to throw the ball to a base" he must resume his former position before delivering the ball to the plate.
- On-field mingling between opposing players was prohibited.
- A sacrifice hit would no longer result in hitters being charged with an at bat, though the question on whether this counted for outfield fly balls was an open question (the "sacrifice hit" was not a formal rule until the following season).

== Teams ==
An asterisk (*) denotes the ballpark a team played the minority of their home games at

League	Team	City	Ballpark	Capacity	Manager
National League	Baltimore Orioles	Baltimore, Maryland	Union Park	6,500	Ned Hanlon
National League	Boston Beaneaters	Boston, Massachusetts	South End Grounds	8,500	Frank Selee
National League	Brooklyn Grooms	Brooklyn, New York	Eastern Park	12,000	Dave Foutz
National League	Chicago Colts	Chicago, Illinois	South Side Park*	6,450*	Cap Anson
National League	Chicago Colts	Chicago, Illinois	West Side Park	13,000	Cap Anson
National League	Cincinnati Reds	Cincinnati, Ohio	League Park (Cincinnati)	3,000	Charles Comiskey
National League	Cleveland Spiders	Cleveland, Ohio	League Park (Cleveland)	9,000	Patsy Tebeau
National League	Louisville Colonels	Louisville, Kentucky	Eclipse Park (I)*	5,860*	Billy Barnie
National League	Louisville Colonels	Louisville, Kentucky	Eclipse Park (II)	6,400	Billy Barnie
National League	New York Giants	New York, New York	Polo Grounds	16,000	John Montgomery Ward
National League	Philadelphia Phillies	Philadelphia, Pennsylvania	Philadelphia Base Ball Grounds	12,500	Harry Wright
National League	Pittsburgh Pirates	Allegheny, Pennsylvania	Exposition Park	6,500	Al Buckenberger
National League	St. Louis Browns	St. Louis, Missouri	New Sportsman's Park	14,500	Bill Watkins
National League	Washington Senators	Washington, D.C.	Boundary Field	6,500	Jim O'Rourke

1. In today's New York, New York.
2. In today's Pittsburgh, Pennsylvania.

== Standings ==
=== National League ===
National League
Team	W	L	Pct.	GB	Home	Road
Boston Beaneaters	86	43	.667	—	49‍–‍15	37‍–‍28
Pittsburgh Pirates	81	48	.628	5	54‍–‍19	27‍–‍29
Cleveland Spiders	73	55	.570	12½	47‍–‍22	26‍–‍33
Philadelphia Phillies	72	57	.558	14	43‍–‍22	29‍–‍35
New York Giants	68	64	.515	19½	49‍–‍20	19‍–‍44
Cincinnati Reds	65	63	.508	20½	37‍–‍27	28‍–‍36
Brooklyn Grooms	65	63	.508	20½	43‍–‍24	22‍–‍39
Baltimore Orioles	60	70	.462	26½	36‍–‍24	24‍–‍46
Chicago Colts	56	71	.441	29	38‍–‍34	18‍–‍37
St. Louis Browns	57	75	.432	30½	40‍–‍30	17‍–‍45
Louisville Colonels	50	75	.400	34	24‍–‍28	26‍–‍47
Washington Senators	40	89	.310	46	21‍–‍27	19‍–‍62

=== Tie games ===
12 tie games, which are not factored into winning percentage or games behind (and were often replayed again), occurred throughout the season.

- Boston Beaneaters, 2
- Brooklyn Grooms, 2
- Chicago Colts, 1
- Cincinnati Reds, 3
- Cleveland Spiders, 1
- Louisville Colonels, 1
- New York Giants, 4
- Philadelphia Phillies, 4
- Pittsburgh Pirates, 2
- St. Louis Browns, 3
- Washington Senators, 1

== Managerial changes ==
=== Off-season ===
Team	Former Manager	New Manager
Brooklyn Grooms	John Montgomery Ward	Dave Foutz
Louisville Colonels	Fred Pfeffer	Billy Barnie
New York Giants	Patrick Powers	John Montgomery Ward
Pittsburgh Pirates	Tom Burns	Al Buckenberger
St. Louis Browns	Bob Caruthers	Bill Watkins
Washington Senators	Danny Richardson	Jim O'Rourke

== League leaders ==
Any team shown in small text indicates a previous team a player was on during the season.

=== National League ===
Hitting leaders
Stat	Player	Total
AVG	Billy Hamilton (PHI)	.380
OPS	Billy Hamilton (PHI)	1.014
HR	Ed Delahanty (PHI)	19
RBI	Ed Delahanty (PHI)	146
R	Herman Long (BSN)	149
H	Sam Thompson (PHI)	222
SB	Tom Brown (LOU)	66

Pitching leaders
Stat	Player	Total
W	Frank Killen (PIT)	36
L	Duke Esper (WAS)	28
ERA	Theodore Breitenstein (STL)	3.18
K	Amos Rusie (NYG)	208
IP	Amos Rusie (NYG)	482.0
SV	Mark Baldwin (NYG/PIT); Tom Colcolough (PIT); Frank Donnelly (CHI); Frank Dwyer (CIN); Tony Mullane (BAL/CIN); Cy Young (CLE)	2
WHIP	Kid Nichols (BSN)	1.280

== Milestones ==
=== Batters ===
- Harry Staley (BSN):
  - Set a Major League record by a pitcher when he hits for nine RBIs in a single game on June 1.
- Piggy Ward (CIN/BAL):
  - Set a Major League record by reaching base in 17 consecutive plate appearances between June 16 and 19. He was traded from the Orioles to the Reds mid-streak.
- Arlie Latham (CIN):
  - Recorded his 600th career stolen base, becoming the first player to reach this mark. It is unknown what day this stolen base occurred.
- Harry Stovey (BRO/BAL):
  - Recorded his 500th career stolen base, becoming the second player to reach this mark. It is unknown what day this stolen base occurred.
- John Montgomery Ward (NYG):
  - Recorded his 500th career stolen base, becoming the third player to reach this mark. It is unknown what day this stolen base occurred.

=== Pitchers ===
==== No-hitters ====
- Bill Hawke (BAL/STL):
  - Hawke threw his first career no-hitter and the second no-hitter in franchise history as a part of the Baltimore Orioles, by defeating the Washington Senators 5–0 on August 16. Hawke walked two and struck out six.

==== Other pitching accomplishments ====
- Pittsburgh Pirates:
  - In the second inning of game 1 of a doubleheader, Charlie Ganzel and Herman Long of the Boston Beaneaters were hit by pitch by pitcher Red Ehret. After being taken out of the game and, relief pitcher Adonis Terry proceeded to hit Bobby Lowe and Tommy Tucker by pitch. The four hit by pitches by Pittsburgh pitchers said a major league record.

== Home field attendance ==
Team name	Wins	%±	Home attendance	%±	Per game
Philadelphia Phillies	72	−17.2%	293,019	51.3%	4,440
New York Giants	68	−4.2%	290,000	122.1%	4,085
Brooklyn Grooms	65	−31.6%	235,000	27.9%	3,507
Chicago Colts	56	−20.0%	223,500	104.9%	3,062
St. Louis Browns	57	1.8%	195,000	1.3%	2,708
Cincinnati Reds	65	−20.7%	194,250	−1.1%	2,943
Boston Beaneaters	86	−15.7%	193,300	32.0%	2,974
Pittsburgh Pirates	81	1.3%	184,000	3.8%	2,521
Baltimore Orioles	60	30.4%	143,000	52.8%	2,383
Cleveland Spiders	73	−21.5%	130,000	−7.1%	1,857
Washington Senators	40	−31.0%	90,000	−29.8%	1,837
Louisville Colonels	50	−20.6%	53,683	−59.1%	1,013

== Venues ==
The St. Louis Browns leave Sportsman's Park (where they played for 11 seasons) and move to New Sportman's Park, where they would go on to play for 28 seasons through part of 1920.

The ballpark for the Louisville Colonels, Eclipse Park was largely destroyed in a fire towards the end of the previous season, though the team continued to play in its remains. In the 1893 season, the Colonels played only one home game on May 4 at the still destroyed ballpark. They would move one block south at a new ballpark, also named Eclipse Park, when they returned home for their next home game on May 22.

When the World's Columbian Exposition in Chicago opened in May, the Chicago Colts wanted to break with their no-Sundays tradition and start playing Sunday games to attract Fair visitors, but their South Side Park lease forbade Sunday ball. They sought a new location, which turned out to be West Side Park. After drawing well on their two May Sunday games, the club abandoned their three-season tenure at South Side Park after only eight games (their last being on May 24) and moved to the West Side on a full-time basis from their next home game on Sunday, June 18.

== See also ==
- 1893 in baseball (Events, Births, Deaths)
