= Seattle Hustlers =

Minor league baseball team (1890–1892)

- 1890–1892; Seattle, Washington

Minor league affiliations
- Class: Independent (1890–1891); Class B (1982)
- League: Pacific Northwest League (1890–1892)

Major league affiliations
- Team: None

Minor league titles
- League titles (0): None

Team data
- Name: Seattle Hustlers (1890–1892)
- Ballpark: Madison Park (1890–1892)

The Seattle Hustlers were a minor league baseball team based in Seattle, Washington and were Seattle's first professional team. From 1890 to 1892, the Seattle Hustlers were charter members of the Pacific Northwest League. Also referred to as the "Blues", Seattle played home games at Madison Park.

== History ==
The Seattle Hustlers were the first minor league team based in Seattle. On May 24, 1890, the Hustlers played the first professional game in Seattle. Seattle defeated Spokane by the score of 11–8 in the contest, held at Madison Park with 1,200 in attendance. For the occasion, the Seattle, Lake Shore and Eastern Railway ran special trains from Seattle to the end of Yesler Avenue at Lake Washington. From there, two special steamers were provided to take fans to the ballpark.

In 1890, Seattle began play in the Pacific Northwest League, a four-team league that lasted from 1890 to 1892, featuring the Portland Webfeet, Spokane Bunchgrassers, and Tacoma Daisies as well as Seattle. Seattle was called the Hustlers as well as the "Blues," with nicknames in early baseball being largely unofficial.

In their first season of play, Seattle finished in third place, their first of three consecutive third place finishes. Playing the season under manager Elmer Rockwell, the Hustlers ended the 1890 season with a record of 48–36, finishing 12.5 games behind the 1st place Spokane Bunchgrassers. The Pacific Northwest League had no playoffs. Pitcher Kid Camp of Seattle led the league with an ERA of 0.94.

In the 1891 season, Seattle again placed third in the league with a record of 45–55, playing under manager Abner Powell and finishing 14 games behind the first place Portland Gladiators. Camp led the league with 31 wins.

The 1892 Pacific Northwest league became a Class B level league. With a final record of 38–37, the Hustlers placed third under managers Abner Powell and Gil Hatfield, as the team finished 4 games behind the first place Tacoma Daisies. Seattle pitcher Gus McGinnis led the league with 19 wins and 169 strikeouts.

The Pacific Northwest League folded after the 1892 season. It ceased play as a result of the Panic of 1893 financial crisis.

The Hustlers were succeeded in Seattle by the Seattle Yannigans/Rainmakers, who joined the 1896 New Pacific League.

== The ballpark ==
Baseball ads in 1890

The Hustlers played minor league home games at Madison Park. Madison Park is still in use today as a public park, located at 4201 East Madison Street in Seattle. The ballpark itself was across Madison Street from the pavilion.

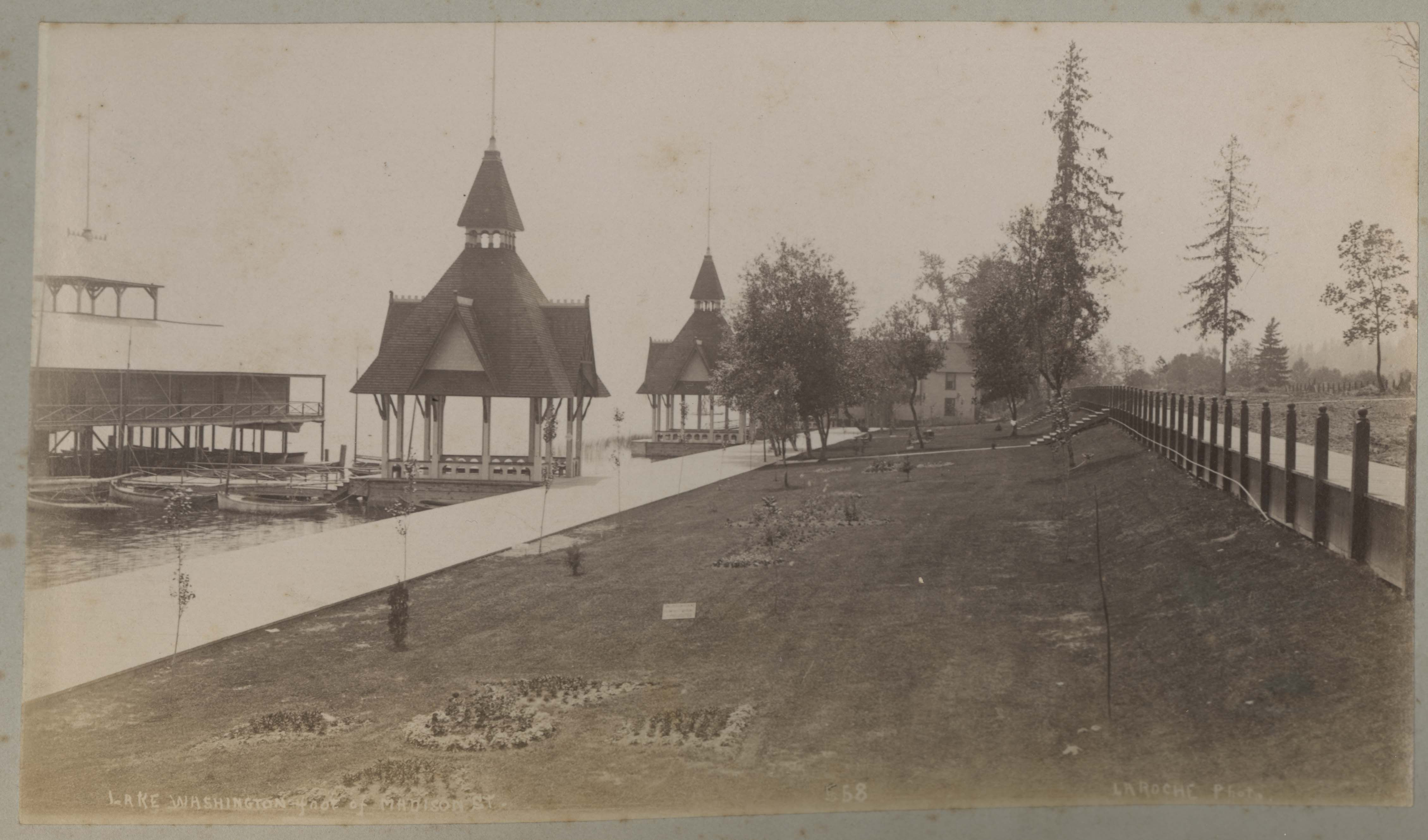
(1891) Madison Street Park, Seattle, Washington.

== Timeline ==
Year(s)	# Yrs.	Team	Level	League
1890–1891	2	Seattle Hustlers	Independent	Pacific Northwest League
1892	1	Seattle Hustlers	Class D	Pacific Northwest League

== Year–by–year records ==
Year	Record	Finish	Manager	Playoffs/notes
1890	48–36	3rd	Elmer Rockwell	No playoffs held
1891	45–55	3rd	Abner Powell	No playoffs held
1892	38–37	3rd	Abner Powell / Gil Hatfield	No playoffs held

== Notable alumni ==
- Cal Broughton (1890)
- Kid Camp (1891–1892)
- Lew Camp (1890)
- Billy Crowell (1891)
- Fred Demarais (1892)
- Andy Dunning (1892)
- Billy Earle (1892)
- Warren Fitzgerald (1890)
- Pat Flaherty (1890)
- Ossie France (1890, 1892)
- Bill Hassamaer (1892)
- Gil Hatfield (1892)
- Tom Hernon (1890–1892)
- Charlie Irwin (1891–1892)
- Bill Lange (1891–1892)
- Sam LaRocque (1892)
- Tom Letcher (1892)
- Mike Mattimore (1891)
- Jim McDonald (1891)
- Gus McGinnis (1892)
- Dan Minnehan (1892)
- Charlie Newman (1891)
- Tom Parrott (1892)
- Charlie Petty (1891)
- Dick Phelan (1891)
- Mark Polhemus (1892)
- Abner Powell (1902–1903, MGR)
- Jumbo Schoeneck (1891–1892)
- Skyrocket Smith (1890)
- Guerdon Whiteley (1890)

== See also ==
Seattle Hustlers players
Seattle (minor league baseball) players
