= Portland Rosebuds (baseball) =

Former US Negro league baseball team

Information
- League: West Coast Negro Baseball League (1946)
- Location: Portland, Oregon
- Ballpark: Vaughn Street Park
- Established: 1946
- Disbanded: 1946
- Nickname: Portland Roses
- Ownership: Jesse Owens

The Portland Rosebuds, sometimes called the Portland Roses, were a baseball team owned by Jesse Owens. The Rosebuds were part of the West Coast Baseball Association, a Negro league headed by Abe Saperstein, the owner of the Harlem Globetrotters.

The Rosebuds played the Seattle Steelheads on their opening day, May 12, 1946, at Dudley Field in El Paso, Texas. They followed opening day with two more days of games in El Paso and one in nearby Ciudad Juárez.

The league was disbanded after only two months.

== History ==
The Portland Rosebuds were a part of an all-black baseball league, the West Coast Baseball Association. Previously in 1936, Jesse Owens had made an attempt at promoting another negro league team, but was unsuccessful. When Owens helped start the West Coast Baseball League in 1946, his team, the Portland Rosebuds, was one of six teams in the league. Other teams in the league included the Oakland Larks, San Francisco Sea Lions, San Diego Tigers, and the Los Angeles White Sox.

The West Coast Baseball League was created as result of black players being banned from organized leagues. It was one of the last negro leagues to exist and the only one on the West Coast. Abe Saperstein, who famously founded the Harlem Globetrotters, served as the president of the league. Jesse Owens was named vice president of the league.

== Season ==
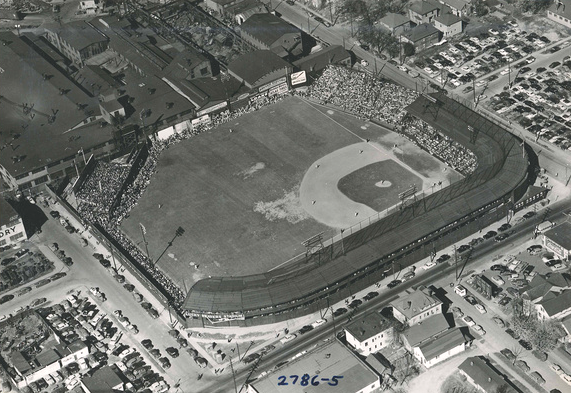
Vaughn Street Park, where the Rosebuds played their home games

The Portland Rosebuds made their debut in El Paso, Texas, on May 12, 1946, against the Seattle Steelheads. There were a total of three West Coast Baseball League games played in El Paso. Owens played a major role in the promotion of these games and was said to have run against racehorses in between double headers. He also used these appearances to verbalize the importance of education being a ticket to a better life.

The Portland Rosebuds played their home games at Vaughn Street Park, home stadium of the local Portland Beavers. Negro Southern League veteran Wesley Barrow was at the helm as manager.

On June 4, 1946, the Portland Rosebuds played their first home game at Vaughn Street Park against the Los Angeles White Sox. There were 1,500 fans in attendance. By the end of June, the Rosebuds were in second place in the league.

== Roster ==
Name	Age	Bats	Throws	Height	Weight (lbs)
Bob Bissant	32	R	R		
Ed Brown					
Eddie Ducey	31				
Alphonse Dunn	39	R	R		
Eugene Hardin		R	R		
Louis Hutchinson					
Gen Jackson		R	R		
Johnson					
Al Jones		R	R	5’10”	165
Clarence McMullen		L	R		
Thomas					
Sam Wheeler	22	R	R	5’11”	155
Bruce Wright		L	R		

None of the players on the team would go on to play in Major League Baseball.

== Disbandment ==
It was previously announced that The West Coast Baseball Association would play a full 110-game schedule. However, despite having a strong standing in the league, attendance and news coverage for games suffered. The West Coast Baseball Association, along with the Portland Rosebuds were disbanded in July 1946.

== Revival ==
In 2021, the Rosebuds were reborn as a collegiate wood bat baseball team that play in the Wild Wild West League.
