= Cannonball Berry =

American baseball player

- Pitcher / Outfielder
- Born: August 23, 1911; Kansas City, Kansas, U.S.
- Died: May 2, 1992 (aged 80); Oakland, California, U.S.
- Batted: Unknown Threw: Right

Negro league baseball debut
- 1937, for the St. Louis Stars

Last appearance
- 1948, for the Cleveland Buckeyes
- Stats at Baseball Reference

Teams
- Negro Major Leagues: St. Louis Stars (1937); Atlanta Black Crackers (1938); Kansas City Monarchs (1947); Cleveland Buckeyes (1948)

Timothy Mike "Cannonball" Berry (August 23, 1911 – May 2, 1992), also nicknamed "Showboat Mike", was an American professional baseball pitcher in the Negro leagues.

== Early life ==
Timothy Mike Berry was born on August 23, 1911, in Kansas City, Kansas.

== Playing career ==
=== Barnstorming/Independent/Minor Leagues ===
Berry began his career with the Thatcher's Colts, a Black semi pro team sponsored by a local Kansas City mortuary. A short time later, he joined the barnstorming Van Dyke's Colored House of David in 1935 as a pitcher, where he was often advertised as their "ace hurler". On August 12, 1937, Berry garnered attention in Vancouver, British Columbia when he struck out 20 batters and allowed 1 hit in a 3–0 victory over a local all star team. He remained with this club through 1939. During World War II, Berry worked at the shipyards in the San Francisco/Oakland area and played on the A-26 Boilermakers, a club representing Black trade workers. Berry appeared for various other teams in California including the Oakland Pierce Giants, California Eagles, San Francisco Sea Lions, and Berkeley Tigers. In 1951 Berry joined several other Negro Leaguers on the Brandon Greys and Elmwood Giants of the Man-Dak League in Canada.

==== Seattle Steelheads ====
When Abe Saperstein's Harlem Globetrotters baseball team joined the West Coast Negro Baseball Association and rebranded as the Seattle Steelheads in 1946, Berry was on the roster. On June 20, Berry fanned 13 hitters in a 10–0 win over the Portland Rosebuds in Vancouver. Berry remained with the club when the league folded and the ballclub itself was merged into the Cincinnati Crescents later that fall.

=== Major Leagues ===
==== St. Louis Stars ====
Berry had 4 stints in the majors, first appearing with the St. Louis Stars of the Negro American League in 1937. In St. Louis, Berry made a lone appearance in league play, giving up 2 runs in 0.1 innings of relief.

==== Atlanta Black Crackers ====
Berry made a single recorded appearance in 1938 with the Atlanta Black Crackers, starting 1 game and giving up 8 runs in 3.1 innings.

==== Kansas City Monarchs ====
Berry received a brief trial on the Monarchs in 1934, pitching in an exhibition game against his former Thatcher's Colts team. In 1947, Berry reunited with the Monarchs, where he primarily pitched as a reliever. In Kansas City, Berry logged 36 innings and 15 appearances, posting a 5.50 ERA.

==== Cleveland Buckeyes ====
Berry made a single appearance in right field for the Cleveland Buckeyes in 1948, going hitless in 3 at bats.

== Pitching style ==
Initially receiving the nickname "Cannonball" from newspaper writers for his high speed fastball, Berry was also described as a "curve ball artist." As he continued barnstorming and playing into his 40s, he was noted for his "stuff" deliveries.

== Death ==
Mike Berry died on May 2, 1992, in Oakland, California.

== Confusion with John Paul Berry ==
Early sources attribute some of Mike's career information to John Paul Berry, a first baseman who briefly appeared on the Monarchs barnstorming rosters in 1935, 1936, and 1945.
