= Alphonse Dunn =

American baseball player

- First baseman
- Born: September 27, 1911; Baton Rouge, Louisiana, U.S.
- Died: September 29, 2004 (aged 93); Laurel, Mississippi, U.S.
- Batted: Right Threw: Right

Negro league baseball debut
- 1937, for the Detroit Stars

Last appearance
- 1943, for the Birmingham Black Barons
- Stats at Baseball Reference

Teams
- Detroit Stars (1937); New York Cubans (1942); Birmingham Black Barons (1942–1943)

Alphonse Dunn (September 27, 1911 – September 29, 2004), nicknamed "Blue", was an American Negro league first baseman between 1937 and 1943.

A native of Baton Rouge, Louisiana, Dunn made his Negro leagues debut in 1937 for the Detroit Stars. In 1942 and 1943, he played for the Birmingham Black Barons, and appeared in two games of the 1943 Negro World Series for Birmingham. In 1946, he played for the Portland Rosebuds of the West Coast Negro Baseball Association. Dunn died in Laurel, Mississippi in 2004 at age 93.
