= Zell Miles =

Professional baseball player

- Left fielder/Pitcher
- Born: October 6, 1909; Alabama, U.S.
- Died: December 18, 1970 (aged 61)
- Batted: Right Threw: Right

Negro league baseball debut
- 1937, for the Chicago American Giants

Last appearance
- 1940, for the Chicago American Giants

Teams
- Chicago American Giants (1937-1940)

Zell Miles (October 6, 1909 - December 18, 1970) was an American professional baseball left fielder and pitcher in the Negro leagues. He played with the Chicago American Giants from 1937 to 1940. He also played for the Seattle Steelheads in the West Coast Negro Baseball Association in 1946 and the Minot Mallards of the Mandak League in 1951.
