= Bill White (shortstop) =

American baseball player (1860–1937)

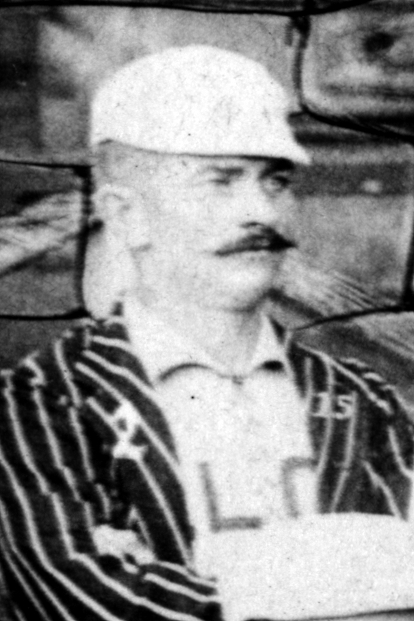
- Shortstop
- Born: May 1, 1860; Bridgeport, Ohio, U.S.
- Died: December 29, 1937 (aged 77); Bellaire, Ohio, U.S.
- Batted: Unknown Threw: Unknown

MLB debut
- June 1, 1883, for the Philadelphia Quakers

Last MLB appearance
- October 14, 1888, for the St. Louis Browns

MLB statistics
- Batting average: .240
- Home runs: 6
- Runs batted in: 205
- Stats at Baseball Reference

Teams
- Philadelphia Quakers (1883); Pittsburgh Alleghenys (1884); Louisville Colonels (1886–1888); St. Louis Browns (1888)

Career highlights and awards
- Led the AA in putouts; 1886–1888; Led the AA in assists; 1887; Led the AA in double plays; 1887; Member the 1888 AA champion St. Louis Browns

William Dighton White (May 1, 1860 – December 29, 1937) was an American professional baseball player who was mainly a shortstop in the Major Leagues for nine seasons from 1879 to 1888. During his Major League career, he played for three different franchises: the Pittsburgh Alleghenys in 1884, the Louisville Colonels from 1886 to 1888, and the St. Louis Browns, also in 1888.

He led the American Association (AA) in putouts among shortstops for three consecutive seasons (1886–1888), and in 1887, he led all AA shortstops in assists and double plays as well. He was a member of the St. Louis Browns when they were champions of the AA, and went to face the New York Giants in a post-season exhibition set of game, known as the "World Series". Although the Browns lost the 10-game series, White played in every game.

== Career ==
=== Early years ===
White was born on May 1, 1860, in Bridgeport, Ohio, and he began his professional baseball career in 1883 with the Pottsville Antharcites of the International Association. During that season he is credited with making an appearance with the Philadelphia Quakers of the National League, which consisted of one at bat without collecting a hit.

=== American Association ===
In 1884, he signed with the Pittsburgh Alleghenys of the American Association (AA), and played in 74 games, 60 of which were at shortstop; he had a batting average of .227 and ten triples in 291 at bats. That season, he also played for the Springfield team in the Ohio State League. For the 1885 season, he remained in the minor leagues, playing for the Washington Nationals of the Eastern League.

In 1886, White signed a contract with Louisville Colonels of the AA, which paid him $2000 for the season. His 143 hits in 135 games that season were his career high totals, as well as his 96 runs, and 17 doubles. He led the AA in putouts for a shortstop for the first time in his career, and on October 9, against Bill Hart of the Philadelphia Athletics, he hit the first of his six career home runs. Staying in Louisville for the 1887 season, White continued as their starting shortstop, and again led the AA in putouts, as well as assists and double plays in 132 games played.

He began the 1888 season with the Colonels, playing in 49 games before moving at midseason to play for the St. Louis Browns, and led the AA in putouts for third time. At the conclusion of the season, the Browns went on to play the National League champion New York Giants in a set of exhibition games called the "World Series". In ten game, the Giants defeated the Browns six games to four, and White participated in all 10 games, but had a .143 batting average however.

=== Return to the minors ===
White returned to the minor leagues after the 1888 season, and play for the Denver Grizzlies/Mountaineers of the Western Association in 1889, 1890, and partially in 1891. He also played for the Minneapolis Millers, of the Western Association for the remainder of the 1891 season. He began the 1892 season with the Butte representative in the Montana State League, however he later joined the Portland Webfeet of the Pacific Northwest League. He moved on to play for the Augusta Electricians of the Southern Association for the 1893 season, and then the Bangor Millionaires of the New England League for the 1894 season, his last as player.

After his playing days were over, White performed three different stints as the manager of minor league clubs in Wheeling, West Virginia. The first took place for the 1896 Nailers of the Interstate League, then in 1901 for the Stogies of the Western Association, and finally for the 1905 Stogies of the Central League.

White died in Bellaire, Ohio, at the age of 77, and is interred at Greenwood Cemetery of that city.
