= Herb Simpson =

American baseball player

- Born: August 29, 1920; Hahnville, Louisiana, U.S.
- Died: January 7, 2015 (aged 94); New Orleans, Louisiana, U.S.
- Batted: Left Threw: Left

Negro league baseball debut
- 1946, for the Seattle Steelheads

Last appearance
- 1954, for the Albuquerque Dukes
- Stats at Baseball Reference

Teams
- Seattle Steelheads (1946); Spokane Indians (1952); Albuquerque Dukes (1952–1954)

Herbert Harold Simpson (August 29, 1920 – January 7, 2015) was an American professional baseball player in the Negro leagues. He played for the Seattle Steelheads in the West Coast Negro Baseball League. He also played for the Birmingham Black Barons and the Chicago American Giants. In the Minor Leagues, he played for the Spokane Indians and the Albuquerque Dukes.

Simpson died in January 2015 in New Orleans. He was 94.
