= Leamon Johnson =

- Shortstop
- Born: August 5, 1916; Crossett, Arkansas, U.S.
- Died: Unknown; Unknown
- Batted: Right Threw: Right

Negro league baseball debut
- 1941, for the Newark Eagles

Last appearance
- 1950, for the Harlem Globetrotters
- Stats at Baseball Reference

Teams
- Newark Eagles (1941-1942, 1944); New York Black Yankees (1942); Birmingham Black Barons (1943); St. Louis–New Orleans Stars (1944); Harlem Globetrotters (1944, 1950); Memphis Red Sox (1945); Los Angeles White Sox (1946); Detroit Senators (1947); Cincinnati Crescents (1948)

Leamon Walter Johnson (August 5, 1916 – death date unknown) was an American professional baseball shortstop in the Negro leagues. He played from 1941 to 1950 with the Newark Eagles, New York Black Yankees, Birmingham Black Barons, St. Louis Stars, Harlem Globetrotters, Memphis Red Sox, Los Angeles White Sox, Detroit Senators and Cincinnati Crescents.
