= Cal Broughton =

American baseball player (1860–1939)

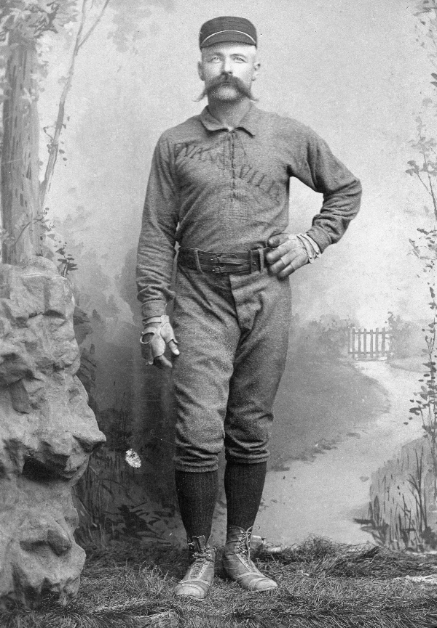
- Catcher
- Born: December 28, 1860; Magnolia, Wisconsin, U.S.
- Died: March 15, 1939 (aged 78); Evansville, Wisconsin, U.S.
- Batted: Right Threw: Right

MLB debut
- May 2, 1883, for the Cleveland Blues

Last MLB appearance
- April 21, 1888, for the Detroit Wolverines

MLB statistics
- Batting average: .189
- Home runs: 0
- Runs batted in: 3
- Stats at Baseball Reference

Teams
- Cleveland Blues (1883); Baltimore Orioles (1883); Milwaukee Brewers (1884); St. Louis Browns (1885); New York Metropolitans (1885); Detroit Wolverines (1888)

Cecil Calvert Broughton (December 28, 1860 – March 15, 1939) was an American professional baseball player from 1883 to 1891. He played parts of four seasons in Major League Baseball, principally as a catcher, for six major league clubs. His career in the major leagues included stints with the Cleveland Blues (1883), Baltimore Orioles (1883), Milwaukee Brewers (1884), St. Louis Browns (1885), New York Metropolitans (1885), and Detroit Wolverines (1888). He also played minor league baseball for clubs in Milwaukee, Wisconsin, Minneapolis and St. Paul, Minnesota, Memphis, Tennessee, and Seattle, Washington.

After retiring from baseball, Broughton became the first chief of police in Evansville, Wisconsin. He captured a group of train robbers after a gunfight in 1900 and years later also captured Evansville's first automobile thieves.

== Early years ==
Broughton was born in Magnolia, Wisconsin. He began playing organized baseball for teams in Evansville, Wisconsin, in 1879 and 1880. By 1882, he was playing for the Janesville Mutuals.

== Professional baseball player ==
=== Cleveland and Baltimore ===
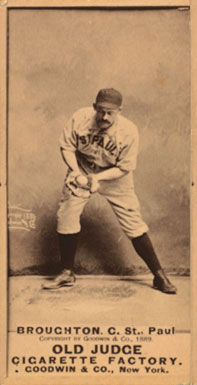
Old Judge baseball card of Broughton

Broughton made his major league debut in May 1883 with the Cleveland Blues of the National League. He appeared in only four games for Cleveland and played in nine additional major league games later that same year with the Baltimore Orioles. He compiled a .190 batting average with the two clubs during the 1883 season.

=== Milwaukee Brewers ===
In 1884, Broughton played for the Milwaukee Brewers, first as part of the Northwestern League and then as part of the newly formed and short-lived Union Association. He appeared in 60 games as part of the Northwestern League and 11 games for the Brewers as part of the Union Association. In 11 major league games in the Union Association, Broughton compiled a .308 batting average.

=== St. Louis and New York ===
In 1885, Broughton played in the American Association for the St. Louis Browns and New York Metropolitans. He appeared in a total of 15 games for the Browns and Metropolitans, compiling a .121 batting average in 58 at bats.

=== Memphis and Milwaukee ===
During the 1886 and 1887 seasons, Broughton played in the minor leagues. He played for the Memphis Grays of the Southern Association in 1886 and compiled a .236 batting average in 82 games. Late in the 1886 season, as the southern teams broke up, he returned to Milwaukee. In 1887, he played for the Milwaukee Brewers of the Northwestern League, batting .303 in 105 games.

=== Detroit ===
In November 1887, Broughton signed to play with the Detroit Wolverines of the National League. He began the 1888 season with the Wolverines, but he appeared in only one game and had no hits in four at bats. His final major league game was on April 21, 1888. According to one newspaper account, he did not "show up well" with Detroit due to illness and was released to Minneapolis.

=== Minneapolis and Saint Paul ===
After being released by Detroit, Broughton finished the 1888 season playing in the Western League for the Minneapolis Millers and St. Paul Apostles. He appeared in 93 Western League games in 1888 and played in another 100 games for the Apostles in 1889. He compiled a .254 batting average in 1889. In June 1889, The Sporting Life praised Broughton's work with St. Paul's pitchers: "People have got so used to seeing Cal Broughton catch game after game without a skip that his fine work is often lost sight of. Where, oh where would some of St. Paul's pitchers be now if they hadn't had Cal's 'head' back of the plate?" The Saint Paul Daily Globe in 1889 said of Broughton: "Broughton is a great coach for a young pitcher, and it takes a pretty fleet-footed runner to steal second base on him. He refuses to get rattled under any circumstances, and is always a prince of good humor." Years later, the Globe wrote that Broughton had been "as good a catcher as the league had." Broughton also began the 1890 season playing for the Apostles.

=== Seattle ===
Late in the 1890 season, Broughton traveled to the west coast where he appeared in 16 games for the Seattle Hustlers of the Pacific Northwest League. Broughton played third base for Seattle, leading The Sporting Life to write that it "looks rather funny to see Cal Broughton playing any position except behind the bat, but he is putting up great third base play." The Seattle club finished in third place, but reportedly "made a remarkable showing since the addition of Broughton."

=== Final seasons ===
He returned to the St. Paul Apostles later in the 1890 season. Broughton concluded his professional baseball career playing for the Lowell, Massachusetts based Lowell Lowells team in the New England League in 1891.

== Family and later years ==
Broughton was married in 1881 to Harriet Chase. After leaving major league baseball, Brougton lived in Evansville, Wisconsin, where he purchased a billiard parlor in 1895. In April 1899, he was elected chief of police in Evansville, a position that he held for 17 years. In 1900, he was in a gunfight with train robbers. Broughton and his assistant Chief of Police captured the robbers, only to have them escape from the jail. Broughton's posse found two of the robbers hiding in a corn field, and the third was captured several days later. Thirteen years later, he captured Evansville's first automobile thieves.

In 1917, Broughton stepped down as chief of police and went to work for the D. E. Wood Butter Company. He returned to the Evansville police department in 1927 as the assistant chief. He remained with the police department until 1933 when, at age 72, he became an invalid. Broughton died in Evansville in 1939 and was interred at Maple Hill Cemetery there.
