= Jiggs Parrott =

American baseball player (1871–1898)

- Parrott in 1895 as a member of the Chicago Colts.
- Third baseman / Second baseman
- Born: July 14, 1871; Portland, Oregon, U.S.
- Died: April 14, 1898 (aged 26); Phoenix, Arizona, U.S.
- Batted: Unknown Threw: Unknown

MLB debut
- July 11, 1892, for the Chicago Colts

Last MLB appearance
- June 6, 1895, for the Chicago Colts

MLB statistics
- Batting average: .235
- Home runs: 6
- Runs batted in: 152
- Stats at Baseball Reference

Teams
- Chicago Colts (1892–1895)

Walter Edward "Jiggs" Parrott (July 14, 1871 – April 14, 1898) was an American professional baseball player whose career spanned eight seasons, four of which were spent with the Major League Baseball (MLB) Chicago Colts (1892–95). Parrott, an infielder, compiled a career batting average of .235 with 174 runs scored, 309 hits, 35 doubles, 23 triples, six home runs, and 152 runs batted in (RBIs) in 317 games played. Although the majority of his career was spent in the major leagues, Parrott also played minor league baseball. He got his start playing amateur baseball with the East Portland Willamettes. His professional baseball debut came in 1890 as a member of the Portland Webfeet. Parrott was the first MLB player from Oregon. He stood at 5 feet 11 inches (180 cm) and weighed 160 pounds (73 kg). His brother, Tom Parrott, was also an MLB player and a teammate of his on the Chicago Colts.

== Early life ==
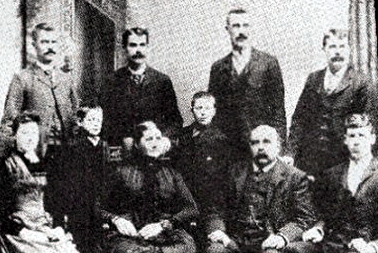
Jiggs Parrott's father, Thomas H. Parrott, worked as a musician in Portland, Oregon.

Walter Edward "Jiggs" Parrott was born on the east side of Portland, Oregon on July 14, 1871, to Thomas H. Parrott and the former Eliza Ann Rhodes. Thomas H. Parrott was born in England but moved outside of Sherwood, Oregon in 1857 which used to be a part of Yamhill County . Although he was training to be a shoemaker in England, when Thomas H. Parrott moved to Portland, he opened a music business. He organized the East Portland Brass Band. Jiggs Parrott had seven siblings: six brothers and one sister. Several of his siblings went on to play professional baseball and worked in music. Parrott played sandlot ball in Portland during his youth. He would also play with his classmates while attending Portland Public Schools. Eventually, Parrott and his brothers, Dode and Tom, signed with the East Portland Willamettes, an amateur baseball team.

== Professional career ==
=== Early minor league career (1890–92) ===
In 1890, Parrott began his professional baseball career with the Portland Webfeet of the Pacific Northwest League. His brother, Tom Parrott, was his teammate on the Portland club. On the season, Jiggs Parrott batted .268 with 71 runs scored, 104 hits, 24 doubles, six triples, five home runs, and 26 stolen bases in 94 games played. He was second in the league in home runs, third in hits and fourth in doubles. Defensively that season, he played third base. Parrott continued to play with the Portland club in 1891, who were now renamed the Gladiators. During the season, the Spokane Daily Chronicle stated that, "'Jiggs' [Parrott] was as much at home at third [base] as ever, and his throws to first [base] continue to excite the admiration of all the bleachers." At the start of the 1892 season, Parrott joined the Minneapolis Minnies of the Class-A Western League. Before the start of the season, The Sporting News said that Parrott "has the build of a successful third baseman. He is tall and spare in flesh. He has been in a gymnasium all winter." With Minneapolis that season, he batted .317 with 31 runs scored, 53 hits, 13 doubles, and six home runs in 41 games played. He was tied for second in the league with James Graham, Joseph Katz and Billy O'Brien in home runs.

=== Chicago Colts (1892–95) ===
During the 1892 season, Cap Anson, the manager of the Chicago Colts, offered Parrott a Major League Baseball (MLB) contract to play with his club. Parrott made his MLB debut on July 11, 1892. During that game, he stuck out twice and made two errors. He was the first player from the State of Oregon to appear in an MLB game. Parrott hit second in the Colts' batting order for most of the season. In his first MLB season, Parrott batted .201 with 38 runs scored, 67 hits, eight doubles, five triples, two home runs, 22 runs batted in (RBIs), and seven stolen bases in 78 games played. He finished the season third in fielding percentage amongst National League third basemen (.891), behind Billy Nash and George Davis. Before the start of the 1893 season, The Sporting Life wrote that Parrott "is somewhat of an erratic player. There are times when he plays good ball, but just when good steady play is necessary, he is very liable to get a case of 'rattles.'" However, in June, The Sporting Life changed its tune and called Parrott's work at third base a "little less than brilliant". It was reported that Anson was impressed by Parrott as a person, calling him a "well-behaved young man" despite some criticism he was getting from the media and fans. During the 1893 season, the Colts signed pitcher Tom Parrott, Jiggs Parrott's brother. The Washington Post reported that Tom Parrott bought out his contract with his former team so he could play with his brother in Chicago. The two Parrott brothers were the only two players from Oregon to play in the MLB during the 19th century. Jiggs Parrott was moved to seventh in Chicago's batting order during the year. In his second season, Parrott batted .244 with 54 runs scored, 111 hits, 10 doubles, nine triples, one home run, 65 RBIs, and 25 stolen bases in 110 games played. His fielding percentage at third base was the fifth highest in the National League (.904), behind Jack Crooks, Denny Lyons, George Pinkney and Billy Nash.

At the start of the 1894 season, Parrott was converted to a second baseman, making way for Charlie Irwin at third base. Manager Cap Anson was criticized by The Sporting Life for continuing to play Parrott. The publication stated, "It is true that [Anson] holds Parrot in high esteem and insists that 'Jiggs' is a great infielder, hence a suffering public may confidently expect to witness still further attempts of 'Jiggs' to hold down the second base bag." On the season, Parrott batted .248 with 82 runs scored, 130 hits, 17 doubles, nine triples, three home runs, 65 RBIs, and 30 stolen bases in 126 games played. In 1895, Anson signed a new second baseman, Ace Stewart from Sioux City, Iowa, which demoted Parrott to the role of utility player. Anson responded to the criticism he had been taking for keeping Parrott by stating, "I realize that 'Jiggs' is not popular with the Chicago crowds, so we will play him in games abroad only." However, The Sporting Life responded by saying, "The local scribes and fans thought we had buried the lanky 'Jigglets,' so far as Chicago was concerned, but he bobs up serenely." Parrott's final MLB game came on June 6, 1895. He played just three games with Chicago that season. In those games, he batted .250 with one hit in four at-bats. He was released early in the season.

=== Later career (1895–97) ===
After being released by the MLB Chicago Colts, Parrott returned to the minor leagues with the Class-B Rockford Forest Citys/Reds of the Western Association. On the season with Rockford, he batted .351 with 18 runs scored, 40 hits, five doubles and two triples in 26 games played. In 1896, he started the season with the Grand Rapids Rippers/Gold Bugs of the Class-A Western League as their starting third baseman. On June 22, he was released by the Grand Rapids club. Parrott then signed with the Columbus Buckeyes/Senators, also of the Western League. Combined between the two clubs that year, he batted .306 in 86 games played. In 1897, he re-signed with the Columbus Senators. As a member of the Columbus club, The Milwaukee Journal noted in September that Parrott had "been playing a great fielding game". However, he appeared in just one game with the Senators, getting one hit in four at-bats. He then signed with the Dubuque, Iowa club of the Class-B Western Association. In 15 games, he batted .213 with six runs scored and 13 hits.

== Death ==
After the 1897 baseball season, he returned to his home in Portland, Oregon with his health deteriorating. In December, Parrott traveled to New Mexico in hopes of re-gaining his health. When in New Mexico, he reported that the weather was too cold and that he was planning to move to Arizona where the climate is more mild. On April 14, 1898, while in a hospital in Phoenix, Arizona, Parrott died of tuberculosis. Earlier that day, Parrott had telegraphed his father, Thomas H. Parrott, back in Portland alerting him that it was not likely he would live two more days. Upon receiving the telegram, Thomas H. Parrott sent his son, Archie Parrott, on a train to Arizona to be with the dying Jiggs Parrott. However, after the train left the station in Portland, the Parrott family got word that Jiggs Parrott had died. Archie Parrott continued to Arizona to retrieve his brother's remains. His remains were returned on April 23. Parrott's funeral was held on April 25, at his home in East Portland. His pall-bearers were several former teammates from the Portland Willamettes: Joseph Beveridge, Charles Neale, Frank Buchtel, William Kern, Fred Bailey, and John Rankin. According to The Oregonian hundreds attended his funeral and 500 people attended his burial at Lone Fir Cemetery in Portland.

== See also ==
- List of baseball players who died during their careers
