= Portland Webfoots =

Minor league baseball team (1901–1902)

- 1901–1902; Portland, Oregon

Minor league affiliations
- Class: Class B
- League: Pacific Northwest League

Major league affiliations
- Team: None

Minor league titles
- League titles: 1901

Team data
- Previous names: Portland Webfeet
- Ballpark: Vaughn Street Ballpark

The Portland Webfoots were a Minor League Baseball team in the Pacific Northwest League. They were based in Portland, Oregon and were active for only two years, 1901 and 1902. They played at Vaughn Street Ballpark.

When the Pacific Northwest League and the California League merged to create the Pacific Coast League in 1902, the Webfoots disbanded and the Portland Browns were created.

== History ==
In the Webfoots' first year of competition, it was reported that they had trouble keeping attendance up at their home field. This began a debate over whether or not Portland should hold a team in the 1902 league expansion with the California League into the Pacific Coast League (PCL), something that Webfoots president Jack Marshal opposed. Some newspapers claimed that Marshal's opposition was due in large part to his personal dislike of Pacific Northwest League president William Henry Lucas.

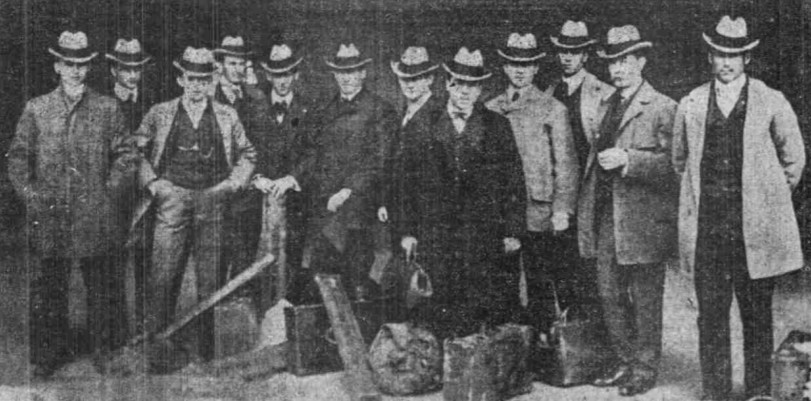
A photograph of the 1902 Portland Webfoots baseball team as they were boarding a train to Tacoma, Washington. From left to right: Andy Anderson, Joseph Mahaffey, Max Muller, Deacon Van Buren, George Engel, George Witbeck, Jacob Deisel, Sammy Vigneaux, Lou Mahaffery, Fred Weed, Marshall, Daniel Hupp.

This led to a long debate over the inclusion of the Portland team in the PCL. Both the Portland and Seattle clubs first wanted to create a rival league to the PCL. Portland was accepted into the PCL but not before a lawsuit filed by the Portland team against the Pacific Northwest League that said the league harassed the team into throwing the league pennant to the Butte Miners.

== Year-by-year record ==
Year	League	Affiliation	Record	Finish	Manager	Playoffs	Ref
1901	Pacific Northwest League	none	73-35	1st	John Grim	League champions	
1902	Pacific Northwest League	none	58-62	4th	Sam Vigneux	none	

== Notable players ==
- George Stovall
- Deacon Van Buren
- Martin Glendon
- Joe Tinker

== See also ==
- History of professional baseball in Portland, Oregon
- Portland Webfeet
- Portland Beavers
