= Tacoma Daisies =

- 1890–1892; (1890, 1891, 1892); Tacoma, Washington

Minor league affiliations
- Previous classes: Class D; Independent
- League: Pacific Northwest League

Major league affiliations
- Previous teams: None

Minor league titles
- League titles: 1892

Team data
- Previous parks: Tacoma Baseball Park

The Tacoma Daisies were a Minor League Baseball team that played in the Pacific Northwest League. They were based in Tacoma, Washington and played in Tacoma Baseball Park. The Daisies were active for three seasons, winning the league championship in 1892. In July 1890, the Daisies agreed to allow Sunday games because of poor attendance.

== Year-by-year record ==
Year	League	Affiliation	Record	Finish	Manager	Playoffs
1890	Pacific Northwest League	N/A	N/A	N/A	N/A	N/A
1891	Pacific Northwest League	N/A	N/A	N/A	N/A	N/A
1892	Pacific Northwest League	none	41-32	1st	Bill Works	none League Champion

== Notable players ==
- Ed Cartwright
- Clark Griffith
- Tom Parrott
