= Seattle Steelheads =

American 1940's Negro league baseball team

Information
- League: West Coast Negro Baseball League
- Location: Seattle
- Ballpark: Sick's Stadium
- Established: 1944
- Disbanded: 1946
- Former name: Harlem Globetrotters, Cincinnati Crescents

The Seattle Steelheads were a Negro league baseball team from Seattle, Washington. Owned by Abe Saperstein, they were also known as the Harlem Globetrotters and Cincinnati Crescents, though occasionally the teams split and played each other.

== Founding ==
Saperstein founded the Harlem Globetrotters baseball team in 1944 to complement his world-famous basketball team of the same name.

Also owned by Saperstein, the Cincinnati Crescents were an All-Star barnstorming baseball team that played in the mid-1940s. The team was managed by Winfield Welch, and featured players such as Bill Blair, Sherwood Brewer, Luke Easter, Alvin Gipson, Bill Jefferson, Leaman Johnson, and Johnny Markham. The Globetrotters and Crescents combined operations and were charter members of the West Coast Negro Baseball League, changing their name to the Seattle Steelheads.

The Steelheads played in the West Coast Negro Baseball League and played their first game on June 1, 1946, against the San Diego Tigers, in front of 2,500 fans at Sick's Stadium. Its players included Cannonball Berry, Nap Gulley, Zell Miles, Rogers Pierre, Herb Simpson, and Fay Washington. The league folded after a month of play.

== Controversy ==
Catcher and manager Paul Hardy joined the Steelheads while still under contract with the Chicago American Giants, causing the Negro American League to ban its teams from playing games in Seattle.

== Home fields ==
Their primary home ballpark was Sick's Stadium. They also planned home games in Tacoma, Bremerton, Spokane, and Bellingham.

== MLB throwback jerseys ==
The Seattle Mariners honored the Steelheads when they wore 1946 Steelheads uniforms on September 9, 1995, at home against the Kansas City Royals. The Royals wore Kansas City Monarchs uniforms. The Mariners beat the Royals 6–4 in front of 39,157 fans at the Kingdome. The game was attended by former Steelhead player Sherwood Brewer. The Mariners wore a different variety of the Steelheads uniform on May 16, 2015, on "Turn Back the Clock Night" against the Boston Red Sox at Safeco Field, and lost to the Red Sox 4–2. On June 19th, 2021 and June 19, 2022 the Mariners again wore the 1946 uniforms as part of Juneteenth. They also wore them on June 17, 2023 due to not having a game on Juneteenth. On January 31, 2026, the Mariners announced that the Steelhead uniforms would be worn for every Sunday home game in the 2026 season.
