= Vaughn Street Park =

Former baseball stadium in Portland, Oregon, U.S.

Vaughn Street Ballpark
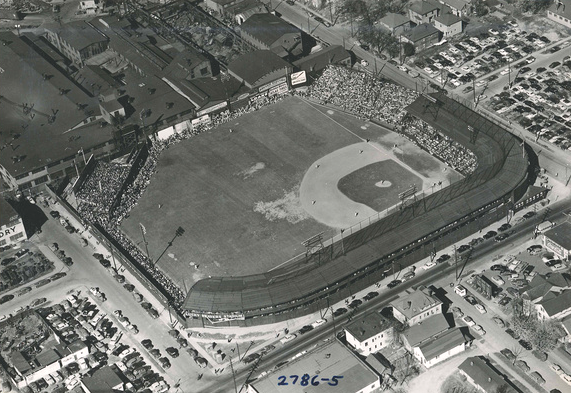
- Aerial view from the southwest in 1951

- Location in the United States Location in Oregon
- Interactive map of Vaughn Street Ballpark
- Address: NW 24th & Vaughn
- Location: Portland, Oregon, U.S.
- Coordinates: 45.537°N 122.701°W
- Owner: E. I. Fuller, C. F. Swigert
- Capacity: 12,000
- Surface: Natural grass
- Field size: Left Field: 331 ft (101 m); Center Field: 368 ft (112 m); Right Field: 315 ft (96 m)

Construction
- Groundbreaking: 1901
- Opened: 1901; 125 years ago
- Closed: 1956; 70 years ago
- Demolished: 1956

Tenants
- Portland Beavers (PCL); Portland Colts (NWL); Portland Rosebuds (WCBA)

Vaughn Street Park was a baseball park in Portland, Oregon, United States. Opened in 1901, it lasted for over a half century and was torn down in 1956. Its primary tenant was the Portland Beavers of the Pacific Coast League (PCL). During a stretch when the club was tagged as the "Lucky Beavers", the ballpark was also sometimes called Lucky Beavers Stadium.

The site, in the Slabtown area, is presently an industrial property with no traces of the stadium except for a plaque.

== History ==
Sanborn diagram of the ballpark, 1908

Built 125 years ago in 1901, it was financed by E. I. Fuller and C. F. Swigert, two owners of trolley lines that ran nearby. The ballpark was on a block bounded by Northwest Vaughn Street on the south (third base), Northwest 24th Avenue on the east (first base), and Northwest 25th Avenue on the west (left to center field). The field had an unorthodox northwest alignment (home plate near the southeast corner), at an approximate elevation of seventy feet (20 m) above sea level.

The two financiers hoped to profit from professional baseball, both at the box office and via fares from their trolley lines. In 1896, Portland's former professional baseball team had folded; a new team, the Portland Webfoots, debuted in 1901. This team would go on to win the Pacific Northwest League title that year. The following year, the league merged with the California League to become the Pacific Coast League; the Webfooters, after several name changes, settled on naming the team the Portland Beavers.

Initially, the stadium had a single 3,000-seat grandstand behind home plate; seating was expanded to 6,000 seats in 1905. That year, Portland hosted the Lewis and Clark Centennial Exposition, and the stadium was used for the National Track and Field championships, held concurrently. During that event, baseball was temporarily played on the grounds of the Portland Athletic Club (later the Multnomah Athletic Club), on a field that is now the site of Providence Park. With the construction of additional seating in 1912, Vaughn Street Park's capacity grew to 12,000 spectators.

=== 1920s–30s ===
In 1926, the stadium received its first serious local competition when the larger and more modern Multnomah Stadium (now Providence Park) opened approximately two miles (3 km) to the south. It was expected that the baseball team, now christened the Beavers, would move to the newer stadium, but the team elected to stay at Vaughn Street. Multnomah Stadium was instead used for other sporting events, including college football and greyhound racing.

Vaughn Street Park occasionally hosted other events besides baseball; several prizefights were held there.

Among the notable players to play at Vaughn Street, either for the home team or for the visitors, are Satchel Paige, Joe Tinker, Jim Thorpe, and Ted Williams.

=== 1940s–50s ===
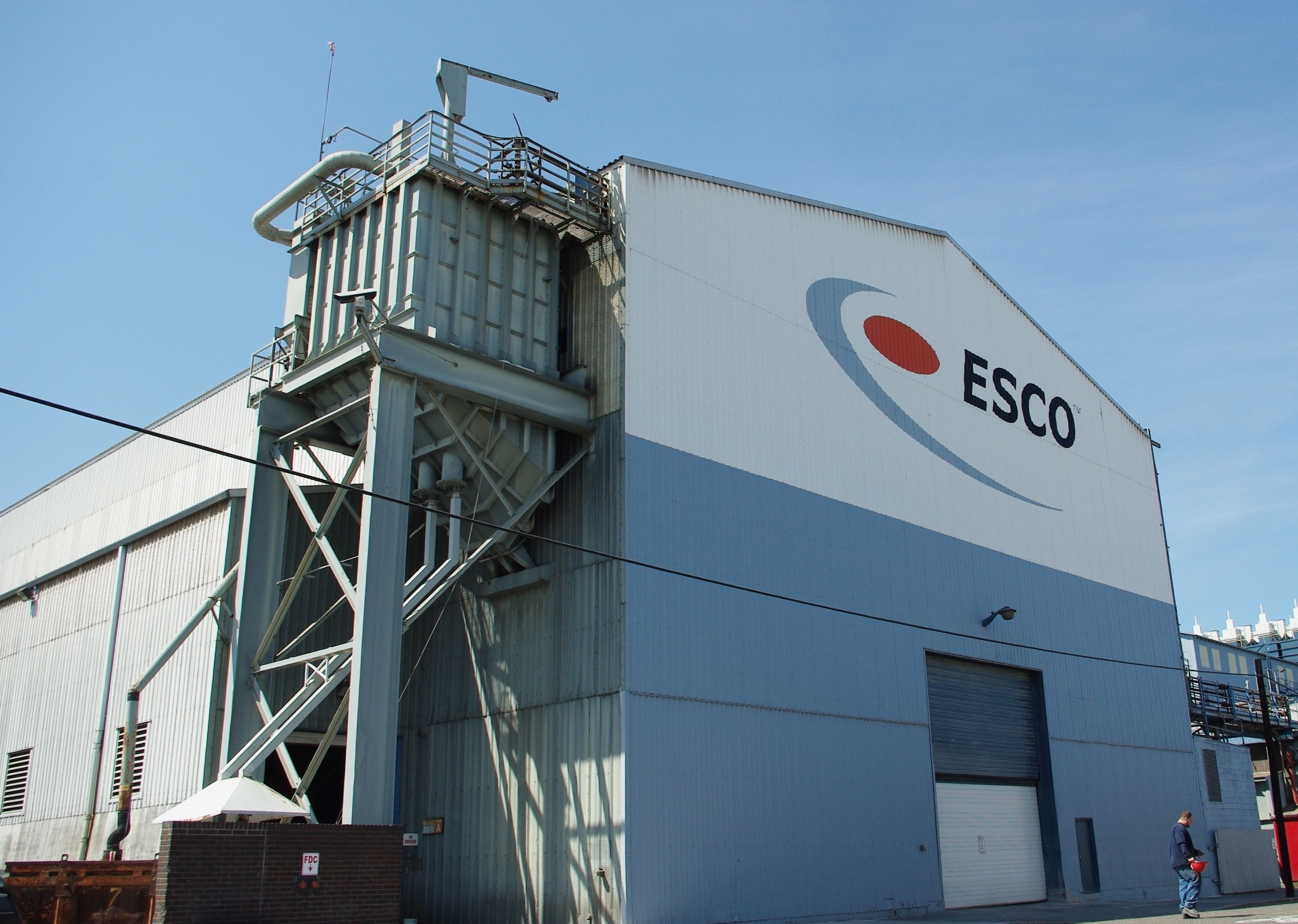
Building on the ballpark site

According to The Oregon Encyclopedia, Vaughn Street Park "may have enjoyed its heyday during the early 1940s, when it drew workers from nearby shipyards".

The stadium briefly became the home of the Portland Rosebuds in 1946, a team owned by Olympic gold medalist Jesse Owens. The Rosebuds were part of the West Coast Baseball Association, a Negro league headed by Abe Saperstein, the owner of the Harlem Globetrotters; the league was disbanded after only two months.

In 1947, the center field bleachers burned in an early-morning fire on September 21, blamed on a smoldering cigarette; the stadium had recently been condemned by fire inspectors. The center field bleachers were rebuilt, smaller than their predecessors and disconnected from the left field bleachers.

In 1955, the stadium was bought by new owners, who later announced that they would tear it down; the Beavers moved to Multnomah Stadium in 1956. The stadium was razed that same year. The grass field from Vaughn Street was transplanted to Multnomah Stadium; thirteen years later in 1969, artificial turf was installed.

== Dimensions ==
The dimensions were hitter-friendly:

Left field – 331 feet (101 m), wall 20 feet (6 m) high
Center field – 368 feet (112 m), wall 20 feet (6 m) high
Right field – 315 feet (96 m), wall 30 feet (9 m) high

Oregonian sports editor L. H. Gregory, referencing figures from the ballpark's architect, stated in 1950 that the foul line distances were even shorter than the posted distances: left field 315 feet (96 m) and right field 300.5 feet (91.6 m).
