= Rogers Pierre =

American baseball player

- Pitcher
- Born: July 26, 1913; New Orleans, Louisiana, U.S.
- Died: July 27, 1996 (aged 83); New Orleans, Louisiana, U.S.
- Threw: Right

Negro league baseball debut
- 1939, for the Chicago American Giants

Last appearance
- 1946, for the Seattle Steelheads

Teams
- Chicago American Giants (1939); Seattle Steelheads (1946)

Rogers Joseph Pierre (July 26, 1913 – July 27, 1996) was an American Negro league pitcher between 1939 and 1946.

A native of New Orleans, Louisiana, Pierre made his Negro leagues debut in 1939 with the Chicago American Giants, and played for the Seattle Steelheads in 1946. He died in New Orleans in 1996 at age 83.
