= Kid Camp =

American baseball player (1869–1895)

- Pitcher
- Born: December 8, 1869; New Albany, Ohio, U.S.
- Died: March 2, 1895 (aged 25); Omaha, Nebraska, U.S.
- Batted: Both Threw: Right

MLB debut
- May 3, 1892, for the Pittsburgh Pirates

Last MLB appearance
- May 8, 1894, for the Chicago Colts

MLB statistics
- Win–loss: 0–2
- Strikeouts: 12
- Earned run average: 6.40
- Stats at Baseball Reference

Teams
- Pittsburgh Pirates (1892); Chicago Colts (1894)

Winfield Scott "Kid" Camp (December 8, 1869 – March 2, 1895) was an American professional baseball player born in New Albany, Ohio who played two seasons in major league baseball as a pitcher. He appeared in four games for the 1892 Pittsburgh Pirates and in three games for the 1894 Chicago Colts. His brother was infielder Lew Camp, who was his teammate in 1894. The brothers played together for Chicago in an April game against the Indianapolis Hoosiers of the Western League.

Camp began his career with the Seattle Hustlers in 1890, starring in the Pacific Northwest League before playing in the majors. He led the nascent league in ERA in 1890 and wins in 1891. He returned to Seattle in June 1892, after his stint in Pittsburgh. He also pitched for the Oakland Colonels that season. He spent all of the following season with the Augusta Electricians of the Southern Association. After his brief return to the majors with Chicago in 1894, he also pitched for the Sioux City Cornhuskers and Indianapolis.

Camp died of tuberculosis in 1895 in Omaha, Nebraska and is interred at Forest Lawn Memorial Park.

== External Sources ==
- Kid Camp at SABR Bio Project
