= Jake Stenzel =

American baseball player (1867–1919)

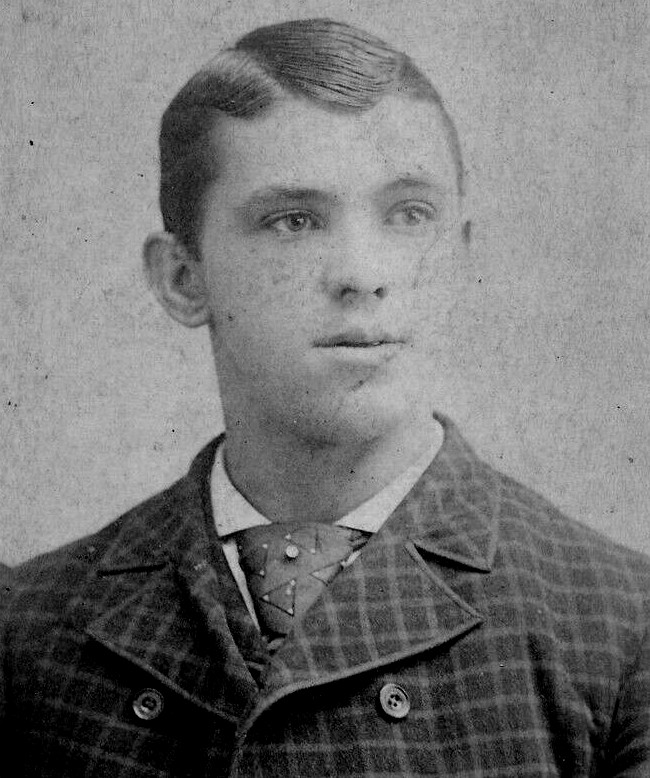
- Center fielder
- Born: June 24, 1867; Cincinnati, Ohio, U.S.
- Died: January 6, 1919 (aged 51); Cincinnati, Ohio, U.S.
- Batted: Right Threw: Right

MLB debut
- June 16, 1890, for the Chicago Colts

Last MLB appearance
- July 23, 1899, for the Cincinnati Reds

MLB statistics
- Batting average: .338
- Home runs: 32
- Runs batted in: 533
- Stats at Baseball Reference

Teams
- Chicago Colts (1890); Pittsburgh Pirates (1892–1896); Baltimore Orioles (1897–1898); St. Louis Browns / Perfectos (1898–1899); Cincinnati Reds (1899)

Jacob Charles Stenzel (June 24, 1867 – January 6, 1919) was an American professional baseball player. He played as a center fielder in Major League Baseball from 1890 to 1899 for the Chicago Colts, Pittsburgh Pirates, Baltimore Orioles, St. Louis Browns / Perfectos, and Cincinnati Reds. Stenzel was 5 feet 10 inches (1.78 m) tall and weighed 168 pounds (76 kg).

== Early career ==
Stenzel was born in Cincinnati to German immigrants in 1867 as Jacob Charles Stelzle; he changed his name when he moved to Wheeling, West Virginia to begin his baseball career. He started his professional baseball career in 1887 in the Ohio State League and batted .387 in 41 games. He then spent the next two seasons in the Tri-State League. In 1890, Stenzel hit .311 for the Texas League's Galveston Sand Crabs and also made his major league debut with the Chicago Colts. He went back to the minors after the season. In 1892, while playing for the Portland Webfeet, he led the Pacific Northwest League in batting average, at .339. He joined the National League's Pittsburgh Pirates towards the end of the season and went hitless in nine at bats.

== Major league regular ==
Stenzel appeared in 60 games for the Pirates in 1893 and batted .362 to establish his reputation as a strong hitter. Over the following three seasons, he was the team's regular center fielder. He posted the best statistics of his career in 1894, when he hit .352 with 13 home runs and 121 runs batted in in 131 games. His 150 runs scored in 1894 remains the Pirates single-season franchise record. In 1895, Stenzel raised his batting average to .371; his OPS+ total of 157 ranked fifth in the league. In 1896, he hit .361 to lead the Pirates in batting average for the third straight season. He became the first Pittsburgh player to collect six hits in a game, which he accomplished on May 14.

In November 1896, Stenzel was traded to the Baltimore Orioles. He had another solid season in 1897, batting .353 and leading the NL with 43 doubles. He also hit .381 in the post-season Temple Cup series, which Baltimore won over the Boston Beaneaters. In 1898, Stenzel was batting .254 in June when he was traded to the St. Louis Browns. He finished the year with the Browns and then played briefly for the Browns and the Cincinnati Reds in 1899 before his professional baseball career ended. Over his nine-year MLB career, Stenzel had 1,024 hits and a .338 batting average in 761 games. He has the 25th-highest batting average in major league history. (Note: Stenzel had the 21st-highest batting average in major league history before the statistics of Negro Leagues players were included in major league records.)

== Later life ==
Stenzel had a wife and two children. After his baseball days were over, he ran a bar in Cincinnati until he sold it during World War I. He then went to work as a night watchman in a factory.

Stenzel died on January 6, 1919 of influenza during the influenza pandemic of 1918-1920 and was buried in St. Mary Cemetery, which is in Cincinnati.

== See also ==
- List of Major League Baseball career on-base percentage leaders
- List of Major League Baseball career stolen bases leaders
- List of Major League Baseball annual doubles leaders
- List of Major League Baseball single-season triples leaders
- List of Major League Baseball single-game hits leaders
