= Fay Washington =

American baseball player

- Pitcher
- Born: January 26, 1915; Alma, Arkansas, U.S.
- Died: April 11, 1975 (aged 60); Chicago, Illinois, U.S.

Negro league baseball debut
- 1940, for the St. Louis–New Orleans Stars

Last appearance
- 1946, for the Seattle Steelheads

Teams
- St. Louis–New Orleans Stars (1940–1941); Birmingham Black Barons (1944); Cincinnati Clowns (1945); Seattle Steelheads (1946)

Lafayette Washington (January 26, 1915 – April 11, 1975) was an American Negro league pitcher in the 1940s.

A native of Alma, Arkansas, Washington made his Negro leagues debut in 1940 with the St. Louis–New Orleans Stars. He went on to play for the Birmingham Black Barons and Cincinnati Clowns, and finished his career in 1946 with the Seattle Steelheads. Washington died in Chicago, Illinois in 1975 at age 60.
