= Sherwood Brewer =

American baseball player and manager

- Right fielder Shortstop; Second baseman Manager
- Born: August 16, 1923; Clarksdale, Mississippi
- Died: April 15, 2003 (aged 79); Chicago, Illinois
- Batted: Right Threw: Right

Negro leagues debut
- 1948, New York Cubans

Last appearance
- 1956, San Angelo Colts
- Stats at Baseball Reference

Teams
- As player: Cincinnati Crescents (1946); New York Cubans (1948); Indianapolis Clowns (1949–1951); Ardmore Indians (1952); Kansas City Monarchs (1953–1954); San Angelo Colts (1955–1956); As manager: Kansas City Monarchs (1960–1961)

Sherwood Brewer (August 16, 1923 – April 15, 2003) was an American baseball player who was a member of the Negro leagues.

== Early years ==
Brewer was born in Clarksdale, Mississippi, and grew up in Centralia, Illinois, raised by his uncle and aunt after his father's death. He was a veteran of the US Army and served in World War II and the Korean War. He served during the Battle of Saipan and participated in a baseball league that began there.

== Career ==
When Brewer returned from World War II, he spurned offers from Negro league teams to sign with Abe Saperstein's Cincinnati Crescents citing the extra travel associated with the team that he had formed. He began playing in the Negro leagues in 1946. He played for a number of teams including the Chicago American Giants, the Indianapolis Clowns, the Kansas City Monarchs, the Seattle Steelheads, and the Harlem Globetrotters. He also played for the Saskatoon Gems in Canada.

As a professional, Brewer initially played right field before moving to shortstop. He ended up as a second baseman. He also was manager of the Monarchs, the last one before the team ceased to exist.

In 1996, Brewer founded the Negro League Baseball Players Foundation.

== Death ==
On April 15, 2003, Brewer died at the age of 79.
