= Alvin Gipson =

American baseball player (1914–1987)

- Pitcher
- Born: May 7, 1914; Shreveport, Louisiana, U.S.
- Died: March 25, 1987 (aged 72); Shreveport, Louisiana, U.S.
- Batted: Right Threw: Right

Negro Major Leagues debut
- 1941, for the Birmingham Black Barons

Last appearance
- 1946, for the Birmingham Black Barons
- Stats at Baseball Reference

Teams
- Independent/Minor: New Orleans Crescent Stars (1940); Detroit Senators (1947); Cincinnati Crescents (1948); Major Leagues: Chicago American Giants (1941, 1949–1950); Birmingham Black Barons (1941–1946)

Career highlights and awards
- 1942 Negro League All-Star; NAL single game strikeout record (20)

Alvin "Bubber" Gipson, Sr. (May 7, 1914 – March 25, 1987) was an American Negro league baseball pitcher in the 1940s. A native of Shreveport, Louisiana, Gipson spent most of his career in Birmingham as a mainstay of the Black Barons' pitching staff.

== Early life ==
Alvin Gipson was born on May 7, 1914, in Shreveport, Louisiana.

== Career ==
=== Independent ball ===
Alvin Gipson began his career playing with Abe Saperstein's independent Cincinnati Buckeyes/New Orleans Crescent Stars, touting a 22–3 record in 1939 or 1940. Gipson was billed as "potentially another Satchel Paige" in press announcing his team's barnstorming tours.

=== Negro Major Leagues ===
==== Chicago American Giants ====
Though no league play statistics are listed for Gipson with the Chicago American Giants, he appears in their 1941 team photo taken at Muelenbach Field in Kansas City.

==== Birmingham Black Barons ====
Gipson joined the Black Barons in 1941 and was on the pitching staff as they won the NAL pennant in 1943 and 1944. He registered a 0–1 record in the NAL's split season playoffs against the American Giants in 1943, but did not make any appearances in either World Series.

==== 1942 All-Star Game ====
In 1942, two East-West All-Star games were played to benefit the Army-Navy Relief Fund. Gipson was named to the West's roster for the second game, held in Cleveland at Municipal Stadium. Gipson made an appearance in relief, pitching 3 innings and giving up 2 runs (1 earned) in the 9–2 loss to the East.

==== Strikeout Record ====
On August 21, 1943, Alvin Gipson struck out 20 Philadelphia Stars batters in Birmingham, setting a Negro American League record. In the 5–1 victory, Gipson struck out the side in 4 of the 9 innings he pitched, including the ninth. Stars second baseman Marvin Williams was fanned 4 times. Following his performance, fans rushed the field to celebrate.

=== Military service ===
On July 2, 1945, Gipson was drafted into the United States Army.

=== Return to barnstorming ===
After leaving the Black Barons, Gipson pitched for the independent Detroit Senators and Cincinnati Crescents. Both teams were managed by Winfield Welch, Gipson's manager in Birmingham.

=== Return to Chicago ===
In 1949, Gipson followed his old manager Welch and returned to the American Giants, staying with the team through the 1950 campaign. Gipson represented the American Giants on a Negro League all star team taking on an integrated Major League all star team in October 1950.

== Death and legacy ==
Alvin Gipson died on March 25, 1987, at the VA Medical Center in his hometown of Shreveport, Louisiana following a brief illness. In 1999, The Times newspaper in Shreveport listed Gipson among the top 100 baseball players to come from the area.
