= Bob Glenalvin =

American baseball player (1867–1944)

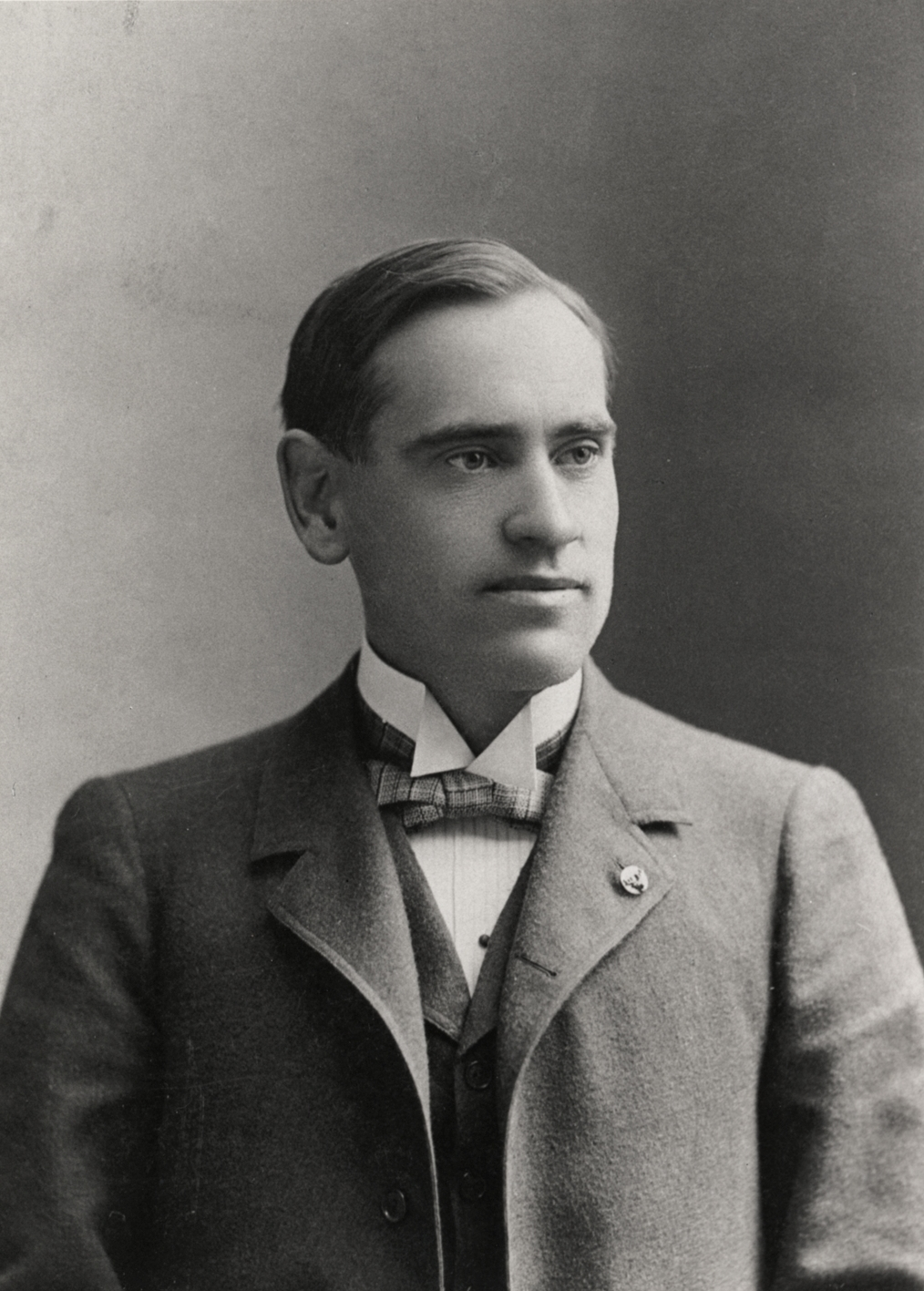
- Second baseman
- Born: January 17, 1867; Indianapolis, Indiana, U.S.
- Died: March 24, 1944 (aged 77); Detroit, Michigan, U.S.
- Batted: Switch Threw: Right

MLB debut
- July 12, 1890, for the Chicago Colts

Last MLB appearance
- September 16, 1893, for the Chicago Colts

MLB statistics
- Batting average: .283
- Home runs: 4
- Runs batted in: 38
- Stats at Baseball Reference

Teams
- Chicago Colts (1890, 1893)

Edward W. Dowling (January 17, 1867 – March 24, 1944), better known as Robert Joseph Glenalvin, was an American professional baseball second baseman and manager. He played for the Chicago Colts of the National League in the 1890 and 1893 seasons. His professional career in Minor League Baseball spanned from the 1887 to 1899 seasons, where he served as the player-manager for several minor league teams. Glenalvin was also an umpire in the minor leagues from the 1909 through 1914 seasons.

== Early life ==
Edward W. Dowling was born in 1867 in Indianapolis, Indiana, His father, William W. Dowling, was a minister. Dowling had three sisters and a brother. The family moved to St. Louis, Missouri, in 1877.

== Playing career ==
Dowling's parents objected to him playing professional baseball, and only consented to it if he used an assumed name. Under the name Bob Glenalvin, he began his professional baseball career with the Lincoln Tree Planters of the Western League in 1887. He struggled and left the team in May. He caught on with teams representing Oskaloosa and Webster City in the Iowa State League, before the league collapsed. He finished the 1887 season with Wichita in the Western League and then signed with Dubuque of the Central Interstate League for the 1888 season. Glenalvin played for Colorado Springs in the Colorado State League and Grand Island of the Illinois–Indiana League in 1889 and began the 1890 season as the player-manager for the Wheeling National Citys of the Tri-State League.

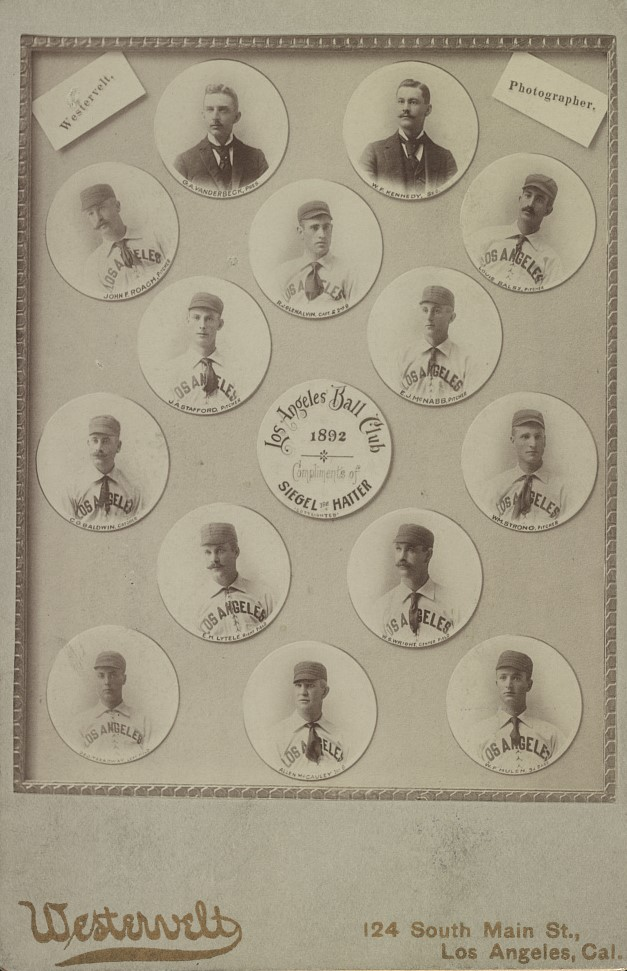
1892 Los Angeles Angels cabinet card

During the 1890 season, the Chicago Colts of the National League signed Glenalvin to be their second baseman. Their previous second baseman, Fred Pfeffer, had signed with the Chicago Pirates of the Players' League for the 1890 season. Glenalvin played 66 games for Chicago, compiling a .268 batting average. Pfeffer returned to the Colts after the Players' League folded following the 1890 season, and Glenalvin secured his release from Chicago to become the player-manager of the Portland Webfeet of the Pacific Northwest League in 1891. Portland won the league's championship and agreed to face the San Jose team, champions of the California League, in a best-of-19 game series, which lasted from November 1891 to January 1892. In the 19th game, Glenalvin pulled his team off of the field in protest of a call made by the umpire. San Jose was declared the winner in a forfeit.

In 1892, Glenalvin was named manager and captain of the Los Angeles Angels of the California League. He began the 1893 season in the same roles. The Colts signed Glenalvin in August 1893. He played in 16 games for the Colts late in the 1893 season, and batted .344. The Colts sold Glenalvin to the Detroit Tigers of the Western League before the 1894 season to be their second baseman, captain, and manager for $600 ($22,327 in current dollar terms). After the 1894 season, Glenalvin accused team owner George Vanderbeck of exceeding the league's salary limits and of not paying him the additional $812 that he was promised on top of his permitted salary. Glenalvin brought this discrepancy to the league's attention in 1895, and they ruled in favor of Glenalvin, ordering Vanderbeck to pay him by March 1 or forfeit the franchise.

Glenalvin signed on as the player-manager for Terre Haute in May 1895. In 1896, Glenalvin partnered with Robert Leadley to re-establish the Pacific Northwest League as the New Pacific League. Glenalvin captained, managed, and played second base for the Portland Gladiators. The league collapsed at midseason and Glenalvin became the manager of the Milwaukee Brewers of the Western League for the remainder of the season. After the 1896 season, Glenalvin and Leadley bought the Grand Rapids Gold Bugs of the Western League, and he played the 1897 season as their captain, manager, and second baseman. In 1898, Glenalvin played for the St. Paul Saints of the Western League, and led the league in sacrifice hits. He considered retiring, but returned to St. Paul for the 1899 season. His mother, who was ill at the time, made him promise that he would retire from baseball.

== Later career ==
In 1902, Glenalvin accepted a position as an editor for the Christian Board of Publication, which produced religious papers. His father served as the editor-in-chief. He also wrote short stories for a Sunday school publication called "Our Young People". In 1907, Glenalvin was reported to be working in the lumber industry in Redding, California.

Glenalvin returned to baseball as an umpire in the Western League in 1909. He signed on to umpire in the Texas League for the 1910 season. Glenalvin umpired in the Central League in 1911, but was dismissed in May due to complaints from managers. In June, he began to umpire in the Central Association, but was not brought back to start the season in 1912. The Central Association brought Glenalvin back in May 1912 In 1913, the league president again hired new umpires for the start of the season, and hired Glenalvin to return to umpiring in the Central Association in June 1913. The Central Association re-signed Glenalvin before the 1914 season, but he did not return for the 1915 season.

== Personal life ==
Glenalvin married Jessie (née Laing) in February 1892. His real name became a part of the public record when he filed for his marriage license.

Glenalvin resided in Detroit in his later life. He died at Henry Ford Hospital after having a heart attack on March 24, 1944.
