= Spokane Bunchgrassers =

- 1890–1892; (1890, 1891, 1892); Spokane, Washington

Minor league affiliations
- Previous classes: Class D; Independent
- League: Pacific Northwest League

Major league affiliations
- Previous teams: None

Minor league titles
- League titles: 1890

Team data
- Previous parks: Northwest League Grounds

The Spokane Bunchgrassers were a Minor League Baseball team in the Pacific Northwest League. They were located in Spokane, Washington and played at the Northwest League Grounds. They won the first ever Pacific Northwest League Championship.

== Year-by-year record ==
| Year | League | Affiliation | Record | Finish | Manager | Playoffs |
|---|---|---|---|---|---|---|
| 1890 | Pacific Northwest League | N/A | N/A | N/A | N/A | League Champion |
| 1891 | Pacific Northwest League | N/A | N/A | N/A | N/A | N/A |
| 1892 | Pacific Northwest League | none | 29-46 | 4th | Ollie Beard | none |

== Notable players ==
- Ollie Beard
- Jack Brennan
- Abner Dalrymple
- Lefty Marr
- Harry Raymond
- Phil Reccius
- John Sowders
- Joe Strauss
