= Pacific Northwest League =

American baseball league

- Formerly: New Pacific League
- Sport: Baseball
- Founded: 1890
- Folded: 1903
- Director: W.B. Bushnell, (1892) M.J. Roach, (1896) William Henry Lucas, (1901-1902)
- No. of teams: 15
- Country: United States; Canada
- Last champions: 1890 Spokane; 1891 Portland; 1892 Tacoma; 1896 Portland; 1901 Portland; 1902 Butte
- Most titles: Portland, 3
- Related competitions: Pacific National League

The Pacific Northwest League was a professional Minor League Baseball league based in the Pacific Northwest. It was the first professional baseball league ever in the region.

== History ==
=== Founding ===
The Pacific Northwest League was founded in 1890. In January 1890, investors met in Portland, Oregon to discuss a four-to-six team league in the Pacific Northwest. The league folded during the second half of the 1892 season because of a nationwide economic depression known as the "Panic of 1893." During its time, the league was known for its former Major League players such as Kid Baldwin and Ollie Beard. In 1892 the league President was W. E. Rockwell and the Secretary was M. J. Roche. The league was revived briefly in 1896, but only lasted until mid-June due in part to poor weather. The 1896 version was also known as the New Pacific League. Early rules for the league included salary caps of $1,000 per month, later raised to $1,300 per month. The league agreed to add a team from Walla Walla, Washington and either Wardner, Idaho or Wallace, Idaho in the beginning of 1892 and the league was also close to adding a team from Salem, Oregon but folded before anything was announced. The league denied Olympia, Washington a baseball team in 1892.

=== Second resurrection ===
The second Pacific Northwest League began play in 1901 as a four-team league, and was a six-team Class B circuit in 1902 when the minors were first classified. The next season it expanded with teams in Los Angeles, California and San Francisco, California and was renamed the Pacific National League. The league competed with the California League, and eventually folded after the 1905 season. The President of the league for the two years was William Henry Lucas.

== Teams ==
=== Pacific Northwest League: 1890 to 1892 ===
| Team name | Town represented | Stadium | Year(s) active |
|---|---|---|---|
| Portland Webfeet | Portland, Oregon | Columbia Park | 1890 to 1892 |
| Seattle Hustlers | Seattle, Washington | Madison Park | 1890 to 1892 |
| Spokane Bunchgrassers | Spokane, Washington | Northwest League Grounds | 1890 to 1892 |
| Tacoma Daisies | Tacoma, Washington | South 11th Street Grounds | 1890 to 1892 |

=== Pacific Northwest League, AKA New Pacific League: 1896 ===
| Team name | Town represented | Stadium | Year(s) active |
|---|---|---|---|
| Portland Gladiators | Portland, Oregon | Vaughn Street Park | 1896 |
| Seattle Yannigans/Rainmakers | Seattle, Washington | YMCA Field | 1896 |
| Tacoma Rabbits/Colts | Tacoma, Washington | South 11th Street Grounds | 1896 |
| Victoria Chappies | Victoria, British Columbia | Unknown | 1896 |

=== Pacific Northwest League: 1898 ===
- Portland, OR: Portland Webfoots 1898
- Seattle, WA: Seattle Clamdiggers 1898
- Spokane, WA: Spokane Siwashes 1898
- Tacoma, WA: Tacoma Owls 1898

=== Pacific Northwest League: 1901 to 1902 ===
| Team name | Town represented | Stadium | Year(s) active |
|---|---|---|---|
| Butte Miners | Butte, Montana | Columbia Gardens | 1902 |
| Helena Senators | Helena, Montana | Central Park | 1902 |
| Portland Webfoots | Portland, Oregon | Vaughn Street Park | 1901 to 1902 |
| Seattle Clamdiggers | Seattle, Washington | YMCA Field | 1901 to 1902 |
| Spokane Blue Stockings | Spokane, Washington | Unknown | 1901 |
| Spokane Smoke Eaters | Spokane, Washington | Natatorium Park | 1902 |
| Tacoma Tigers | Tacoma, Washington | South 11th Street Grounds | 1901-1902 |

=== Pacific National League: 1903 to 1905 ===
| Team name | Town represented | Stadium | Year(s) active |
|---|---|---|---|
| Boise Fruit Pickers/Boise Infants | Boise, Idaho | Unknown | 1904 to 1905 |
| Butte Miners | Butte, Montana | Unknown | 1903 to 1904 |
| Helena Senators | Helena, Montana | Unknown | 1903 |
| Los Angeles Nationals | Los Angeles, California | Prager Park | 1903 |
| Ogden Lobsters | Ogden, Utah | Unknown | 1905 |
| Portland Green Gages | Portland, Oregon | Vaughn Street Park | 1903 |
| Salt Lake City Elders/Salt Lake City Fruit Pickers | Salt Lake City, Utah | Unknown | 1903 to 1905 |
| San Francisco Pirates | San Francisco, California | National Park | 1903 |
| Seattle Chinooks | Seattle, Washington | YMCA Field | 1903 |
| Spokane Indians | Spokane, Washington | Unknown | 1903-1905 |
| Tacoma Tigers | Tacoma, Washington | South 11th Street Grounds | 1903 |

== Standings and statistics ==
=== 1890 to 1892 ===
1890 Pacific Northwest League

| Team standings | W | L | PCT | GB | Managers |
|---|---|---|---|---|---|
| Spokane Bunchgrassers | 61 | 34 | .642 | - | John Barnes |
| Tacoma Daisies | 54 | 41 | .568 | 7 | William Lucas |
| Seattle Blues | 48 | 46 | .511 | 12½ | Elmer Rockwell |
| Portland Gladiators | 25 | 67 | .272 | 34½ | Richard Dwyer / Henry Harris / William Hassamaer |

Player statistics
| Player | Team | Stat | Tot | Player | Team | Stat | Tot |
|---|---|---|---|---|---|---|---|
| Piggy Ward | Spokane | BA | .368 | Jack Huston | Spokane | W | 28 |
| Piggy Ward | Spokane | Runs | 97 | Frank March | Tacoma | SO | 197 |
| Thomas Turner | Spokane | Hits | 123 | Kid Camp | Seattle | ERA | 1.08 |
| Thomas Turner | Spokane | HR | 12 | Jack Huston | Spokane | PCT | .777 28-8 |
| Al Mannassau | Tacoma | SB | 57 | | | | |

1891 Pacific Northwest League

| Team standings | W | L | PCT | GB | Managers |
|---|---|---|---|---|---|
| Portland Gladiators | 58 | 40 | .592 | - | Bob Glenalvin |
| Spokane Bunchgrassers | 57 | 43 | .570 | 2 | John Barnes |
| Seattle Blues | 45 | 55 | .450 | 14 | Abner Powell |
| Tacoma Daisies | 38 | 60 | .388 | 20 | Leech Maskrey |

Player statistics
| Player | Team | Stat | Tot | Player | Team | Stat | Tot |
|---|---|---|---|---|---|---|---|
| Jake Stenzel | Spokane | BA | .351 | Kid Camp | Seattle | W | 31 |
| Jake Stenzel | Spokane | Runs | 135 | George Borchers | Spokane | SO | 220 |
| Jake Stenzel | Spokane | Hits | 149 | John Huston | Spokane | PCT | .688 22-10 |
| Thomas Turner | Spokane | HR | 13 | | | | |
| Jake Stenzel | Spokane | SB | 68 | | | | |

1892 Pacific Northwest League

| Team standings | W | L | PCT | GB | Managers |
|---|---|---|---|---|---|
| Tacoma Daisies | 41 | 32 | .562 | - | Bill Works |
| Portland Webfeet | 41 | 34 | .547 | 1 | John Barnes |
| Seattle Blues | 38 | 37 | .507 | 4 | Abner Powell / Gil Hatfield |
| Spokane Bunchgrassers | 29 | 46 | .387 | 13 | Ollie Beard |

Player Statistics
| Player | Team | Stat | Tot | Player | Team | Stat | Tot |
|---|---|---|---|---|---|---|---|
| Jake Stenzel | Portland | BA | .339 | Gus McGinnis | Seattle | W | 19 |
| Bill Goodenough | Tacoma | Runs | 77 | Gus McGinnis | Seattle | SO | 169 |
| Bill Works | Tacoma | Hits | 101 | Jack Leiper | Portland | Pct | .700: 14-6 |
| Ed Cartwright | Tacoma | HR | 7 | | | | |

=== 1896, 1898 ===
1896 Pacific Northwest League a/k/a/ New Pacific League

| Team standings | W | L | PCT | GB | Managers |
|---|---|---|---|---|---|
| Portland Gladiators | 19 | 9 | .679 | - | Bob Glenalvin |
| Tacoma Robbers / Tacoma Colts | 16 | 17 | .485 | 5½ | Charles Strobel |
| Victoria Chappies | 13 | 16 | .448 | 6½ | August Klopf / George Derby |
| Seattle Rainmakers | 13 | 19 | .406 | 8 | Count Campau |

The league disbanded June 15.

Player Statistics
| Player | Team | Stat | Tot | Player | Team | Stat | Tot |
|---|---|---|---|---|---|---|---|
| Bob Glenalvin | Portland | BA | .448 | Ike Butler | Seattle | W | 9 |
| Count Campau | Seattle | Runs | 55 | George Derby | Victoria | SO | 64 |
| John Morrissey | Tacoma | Hits | 57 | George Borchers | Portland | Pct | .875: 7-1 |
| F.A. Whaling | Victoria | Hits | 57 | | | | |
| Count Campau | Seattle | HR | 13 | | | | |
| Billy Smith | Tacoma | SB | 20 | | | | |

1898 Pacific Northwest League

| Team standings | W | L | PCT | GB | Managers |
|---|---|---|---|---|---|
| Seattle Clamdiggers | 32 | 14 | .696 | - | Dan Dugdale |
| Portland Webfoots | 23 | 24 | .489 | 9½ | George Borchers / Jack Page |
| Spokane Siwashes | 19 | 26 | .422 | 12½ | E.H. Hutchinson / Billy Connors |
| Tacoma Owls | 19 | 27 | .413 | 13 | Bill Works |

=== 1901 to 1902 ===
1901 Pacific Northwest League
schedule

| Team standings | W | L | PCT | GB | Managers |
|---|---|---|---|---|---|
| Portland Webfoots | 73 | 35 | .675 | - | John J. Grim |
| Tacoma Tigers | 57 | 51 | .530 | 16 | John McCloskey |
| Seattle Clamdiggers | 45 | 63 | .417 | 28 | Dan Dugdale |
| Spokane Blue Stockings | 41 | 67 | .379 | 32 | Thomas Turner / Joe Marshall / Maloney |

Player statistics
| Player | Team | Stat | Tot | Player | Team | Stat | Tot |
|---|---|---|---|---|---|---|---|
| Charles McIntyre | Tacoma | BA | .341 | Clyde Engle | Portland | W | 28 |
| Joe McCarthy | Tacoma | Runs | 98 | Bill Salisbury | Portland | W | 28 |
| Charles McIntyre | Tacoma | Hits | 149 | Jim St. Vrain | Tacoma | SO | 299 |
| Joe Marshall | Spokane | HR | 15 | Clyde Engle | Portland | Pct | .718; 28-11 |
| Joe Tinker | Portland | SB | 37 | | | | |
| Joe McCarthy | Tacoma | SB | 37 | | | | |

1902 Pacific Northwest League
schedule

| Team standings | W | L | PCT | GB | Managers |
|---|---|---|---|---|---|
| Butte Miners | 73 | 47 | .608 | - | John McCloskey |
| Seattle Clamdiggers | 70 | 50 | .583 | 3 | Dan Dugdale |
| Helena Senators | 65 | 54 | .546 | 7½ | John Flannery |
| Portland Webfoots | 58 | 62 | .483 | 15 | Sam Vigneux |
| Tacoma Tigers | 48 | 72 | .400 | 25 | Jay Andrews |
| Spokane Smoke Eaters | 46 | 75 | .380 | 27½ | John J. Grim |

Player statistics
| Player | Team | Stat | Tot |
|---|---|---|---|
| Piggy Ward | Butte | BA | .332 |
| Bill Kane | Butte | Runs | 102 |
| Piggy Ward | Butte | Hits | 157 |
| Joe Marshall | Butte | HR | 6 |
| Piggy Ward | Butte | SB | 51 |

== Hall of Fame alumni ==
- Clark Griffith, 1892 Tacoma Daisies
- Joe Tinker, 1901 Portland Webfoots
