= Piggy Ward =

American baseball player (1867–1912)

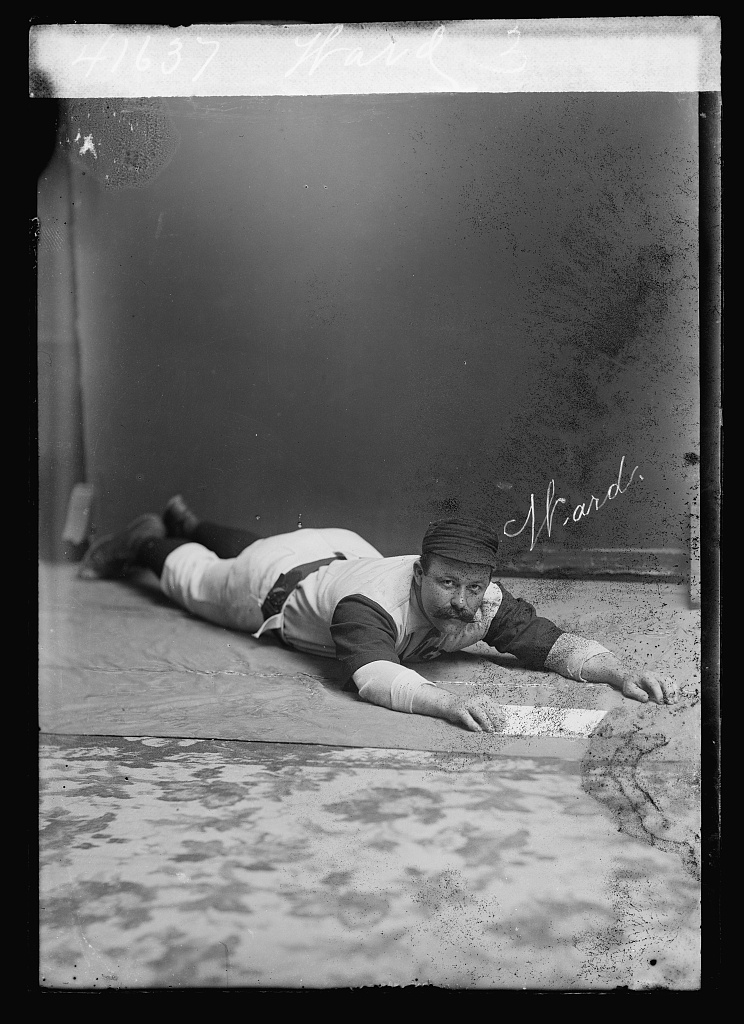
- Ward photographed by C. M. Bell Studio
- Right fielder / Second baseman
- Born: April 16, 1867; Chambersburg, Pennsylvania, U.S.
- Died: October 24, 1912 (aged 45); Altoona, Pennsylvania, U.S.
- Batted: Switch Threw: Right

MLB debut
- June 8, 1889, for the Philadelphia Quakers

Last MLB appearance
- September, 1894, for the Washington Senators

MLB statistics
- Batting average: .288
- Home runs: 1
- Runs batted in: 90
- Stats at Baseball Reference

Teams
- Philadelphia Quakers (1889); Pittsburgh Pirates (1891); Baltimore Orioles (1892–1893); Cincinnati Reds (1893); Washington Senators (1894)

Frank Gray "Piggy" Ward (April 16, 1867 – October 24, 1912) was an American professional baseball player who played as an outfielder in Major League Baseball from 1889 through 1894. He played for the Pittsburgh Pirates, Baltimore Orioles, Cincinnati Reds, Washington Senators, and Philadelphia Phillies.

== Biography ==
Ward shares with Earl D. Averill the MLB record of the most consecutive plate appearances resulting in officially getting on base (through either a walk, a base hit or being hit by a pitch) in major league history. From June 16 to June 19, 1893, Ward officially reached base a record 17 times in 17 consecutive plate appearances, getting eight hits, drawing eight walks and being hit by a pitch once.
