= Portland Webfeet =

Independent baseball team (1890-1892)

- 1890–1892; (1890, 1891, 1892); Portland, Oregon

Minor league affiliations
- Class: Independent
- League: Pacific Northwest League

Major league affiliations
- Team: None

Minor league titles
- League titles: 1891

Team data
- Previous names: Webfoots; East Portland Willamettes
- Previous parks: Columbia Park

The Portland Webfeet were a Minor League Baseball team in the Pacific Northwest League. They were located in Portland, Oregon and played at Columbia Park. They were active from 1890 to 1892.

In 1891, the Webfeet, also known as the Gladiators, won the league championship, even playing teams from the California League, including Sacramento, San Francisco, and San Jose. The Pacific Northwest League folded in the second half of the 1892 season due to the Panic of 1893.

== Year-by-year record ==
Year	League	Affiliation	Record	Finish	Manager	Playoffs
1890	Pacific Northwest League	none	N/A	4th	Richard Dwyer/Henry Harris/William Hassamaer	N/A
1891	Pacific Northwest League	none	N/A	1st	Bob Glenalvin	League champions
1892	Pacific Northwest League	none	41–34	2nd	John Barnes/George Borchers/Henry Harris	none

== Notable players ==
- Kid Baldwin
- Tom Dolan
- Willard Mains
- Jake Stenzel
- George Tebeau
- Bill White
- Jiggs Parrott - First MLB player from Oregon.

== See also ==
- History of baseball in Portland, Oregon
