= Lew Camp =

American baseball player (1868–1948)

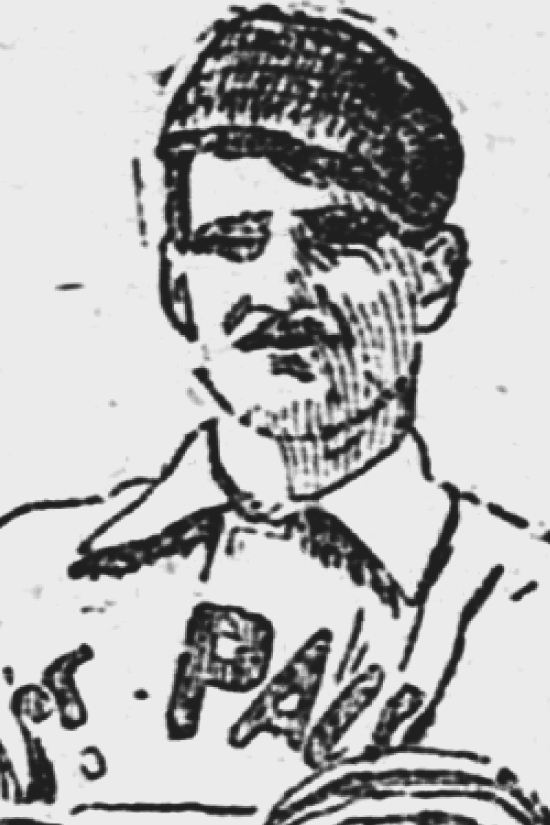
- Third baseman/Second baseman/Outfielder
- Born: February 23, 1868; Columbus, Ohio, U.S.
- Died: October 1, 1948 (aged 80); Omaha, Nebraska, U.S.
- Batted: Left Threw: Right

MLB debut
- August 25, 1892, for the St. Louis Browns

Last MLB appearance
- May 8, 1894, for the Chicago Colts

MLB statistics
- Batting average: .231
- Home runs: 4
- Runs batted in: 31
- Stats at Baseball Reference

Teams
- St. Louis Browns (1892); Chicago Colts (1893–1894)

Robert Plantagenet Llewellan Camp (February 23, 1868 – October 1, 1948) was a 19th-century American Major League Baseball infielder. He played in 1892 for the St. Louis Browns and in 1893 and 1894 for the Chicago Colts. His brother, Kid Camp, was his teammate on the 1894 Colts.
