= Portland Beavers =

- 1903–2010; (1903–1917, 1919–1972, 1978–1993, 2001–2010); Portland, Oregon

Minor league affiliations
- Previous classes: Triple-A (1946–1951, 1958–1972, 1978–1993, 2001–2010); Class B (1902, 1918); Independent (1903); Class A (1904–1911); Double-A (now Triple-A) (1912–1917, 1919–1945); Open (1952–1957)
- League: Pacific Coast League (1903–1917, 1919–1972, 1978–1993, 2001–2010)
- Conference: Pacific Conference
- Division: North Division

Major league affiliations
- Previous teams: San Diego Padres (2001–2010); Minnesota Twins (1987–1993); Philadelphia Phillies (1983–1986); Pittsburgh Pirates (1979–1982); Cleveland Indians (1972, 1978); Minnesota Twins (1971); Milwaukee Brewers (1970); Cleveland Indians (1964–1969); Kansas City Athletics (1962–1963); St. Louis Cardinals (1961); Kansas City Athletics (1959); Chicago Cubs (1957–1958); Brooklyn Dodgers (1956); Detroit Tigers (1935); Philadelphia Athletics (1925–1932); Cleveland Indians (unofficial) (1910–1915)

Minor league titles
- League titles: 1901, 1906, 1910, 1911, 1913, 1914, 1936, 1945, 1983
- Division titles: 1965, 1983, 1993, 2004

Team data
- Previous names: Portland Beavers; Portland Ducks (1929); Portland Buckaroos (1918); Portland Giants (1905); Portland Browns (1903–1904); Portland Webfoots (1902–1903)
- Mascot: Lucky (2008–2010); Boomer (2001–2007); Round Tripper (1979–1994)
- Previous parks: PGE Park (1956–2010); Vaughn Street Park (1901–1955)

The Portland Beavers was the name of separate minor league baseball teams, which represented Portland, Oregon, in the Pacific Coast League (PCL). The team was established in 1903, the first year of the PCL.

== Franchise history ==
Many baseball teams have been known as the Portland Beavers; the most recent club, which began operating in 2001, recognized the history of all previous incarnations as its own, stating it was established in 1903, the same year the Pacific Coast League was established. The "Beavers" originated in 1906 following a newspaper contest to rename the existing Portland team that had been created in 1901 when a group of Portland businessmen founded the Portland Baseball Club.

Along with the Los Angeles Angels, Oakland Oaks, Sacramento Solons, San Francisco Seals, and Seattle Rainiers, a Portland Beavers club was a charter member of the Pacific Coast League in 1903. Portland and Sacramento were the only two charter cities that had a team in the PCL as of 2010, the other cities having been taken over by Major League Baseball franchises.

Following the 2010 season, the Beavers were placed for sale and relocation because of the lack of a suitable stadium in Portland, as PGE Park was being remodeled into a soccer-only configuration for Major League Soccer's 2011 expansion Portland Timbers. In 2010, the Beavers were sold to Jeff Moorad, owner of the San Diego Padres. The team temporarily moved to southern Arizona and became the Tucson Padres while awaiting a new purpose-built stadium in their planned future home of Escondido, California. After the 2013 season, the Padres instead moved them to El Paso, Texas, and became the El Paso Chihuahuas.

=== Establishment of a Portland team: 1903–1918 ===
On December 10, 1902, Henry Harris, the owner of the California League's San Francisco team announced that the Pacific Northwest League team from Portland, the Portland Webfoots, and a new team from Seattle were joining with the California League to create the Pacific Coast League (PCL). Before the Portland franchise joined the PCL, the president of the Pacific Northwest League, Henry Lucas, was adamant in keeping the Portland franchise in his league. A team in the Pacific Northwest League was formed called the Portland Green Gages, which folded early in its first season. When the Portland PCL team first started playing, they were known as the Portland Browns. In their first season, classified as an independent league, the PCL featured six teams including the Browns. The Browns finished their first season fifth in the PCL. During the 1904 season, the Browns finished with a record of 79–136. The 136 losses still stands as a record in the PCL for most losses by a team in a single season. Other records for that season include the most errors in a season (669), and the lowest single-season team fielding percentage (.929).

Before the 1905 season, professional baseball player Walter McCredie and former Republican U.S. House member from Washington Judge William Wallace McCredie purchased the Portland franchise. The team was then renamed the Portland Giants and Walter McCredie was named the player-manager of the team. During the 1905 season, the PCL was re-classified as a Class-A league in minor league baseball. In 1906, the team was renamed the Portland Beavers after a newspaper contest was started to decide the new name of the team. That season, the Portland team won its first pennant in the PCL. Beavers player Mike Mitchell led the PCL in home runs with six, the fewest ever to lead the PCL. Mitchell also led the league in batting average. The 1906 Beavers were recognized as one of the 100 greatest minor league teams of all time.

The Beavers finished last in 1907, and second in 1908 and 1909. In 1910, Portland won another pennant behind the pitching of Vean Gregg and Gene Krapp. Gregg finished the season with a 32–18 record and 14 shutouts while Krapp had a 29–16 record for the season. Portland repeated as PCL champs in 1911 fielding four 20-game-winning pitchers. In 1912, Judge McCredie helped get a new 12,000-seat grandstand built at Vaughn Street Park. His obituary later read that the ballpark was "the sensation of baseball, because it inaugurated a minor league precedent of providing individual grandstand seats, which fellow magnates called an extravagance and a dangerous innovation." The NAPBL made a change to league classifications in 1912, making Double-A the top tier. The PCL, and the Portland Beavers, moved into this new classification from the previous top tier Class A league.

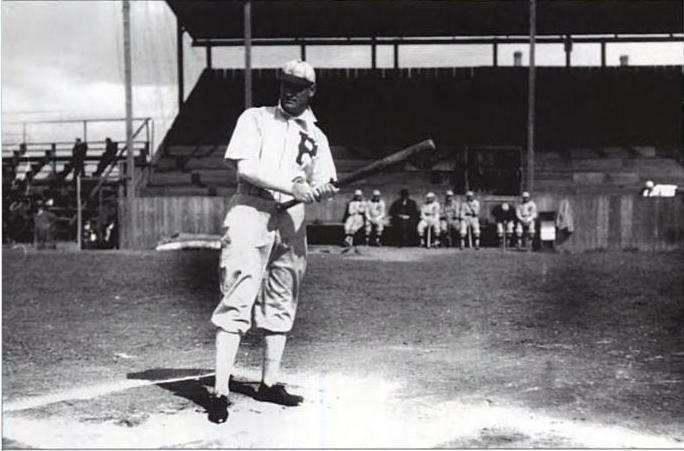
Former Beavers manager and part owner Walter McCredie

During the 1910s, the Beavers developed some working relationships with other teams. From 1911 to 1914 the Portland Beavers had their own farm team which played in the Northwest League (renamed the Pacific Coast International League in 1918). The Class B team shared the use of Vaughn Street Park and was known as the Portland Pippins in 1911, but changed their name to the Portland Colts in 1912. During the 1914 season, the Colts moved to the Seattle area and finished their last season as the Ballard Pippins before folding. Portland also had an informal relationship with the Cleveland Indians through much of the 1910s that saw many future major league stars come through Portland to fine-tune their skills.

Portland played well in 1913 and 1914, winning the pennant both seasons. Though the 1915 Beavers featured future Hall of Famer Stan Coveleski, the team did not fare too well, and started into a tailspin that would last for over a decade. The year also marked the end of their relationship with the Cleveland Indians. With America's entry into World War I, restrictions were placed on travel, such that the Beavers withdrew from the PCL for the 1918 season, playing instead in the Class B Pacific Coast International League. The team was known as the Portland Buckaroos and finished their shortened season (play was stopped on July 7 due to the war) in second place 1½ games back of Seattle. Ironically, the PCL ceased play just a week later as they too were unable to continue play due to restrictions on travel.

Due to the Beavers' withdrawal from the PCL, the league offered Sacramento a franchise to replace the Portland team, while the McCredies continued to own the baseball club in Portland. The new team in Sacramento was known as the Sacramento Senators, and could be considered a continuation of the original Portland Baseball Club.

=== Return to the Pacific Coast League: 1919–1972 ===
With the McCredies still at the helm, Portland was offered an expansion franchise and re-entered the PCL in 1919. The team finished in seventh place, only ahead of last-place Seattle who was also an expansion team that year. Portland finished in last place in 1920 and again in 1921. After the 1921 season, the McCredies sold the team to Walter Klepper who had been president of the Seattle team. Klepper brought in the 35-year old Jim Thorpe, who played outfield and first base with the Beavers in 1922, paying him a then-unheard of minor league salary of US$1,000 per month.

It was not long before Klepper was in the middle of a dispute with Baseball Commissioner Kenesaw Mountain Landis. Klepper had brought Seattle player-manager Bill Kenworthy down to manage the Beavers, only Seattle claimed Kenworthy was still under contract and that Klepper had tampered in the matter. Landis suspended Klepper until January 1, 1925, and declared Kenworthy ineligible to play or manage Portland until 1924. According to The Portland Beavers, a book by Kip Carlson and Paul Andresen, "The feisty Klepper went to court and had the decision overturned, supposedly the only time that Landis ever had a ruling reversed." Kenworthy did manage the Beavers in 1924, replacing popular player-manager Jim Middleton. He was fired mid-season, though, as he was not able to generate support from the players. The 1924 season was also noteworthy in that future Hall of Famer Mickey Cochrane played on the team.

After 1924, the Beavers officially became a farm team for a major league team for the first time when Philadelphia Athletics owners John and Tom Shibe purchased the Beavers as well as Vaughn Street Park. Despite having Duffy Lewis on the team in 1925 (winning the PCL batting title), Elmer Smith in 1926 and 1927 (leading the PCL in home runs in 1926 and all of minor league baseball in home runs in 1927), and Ike Boone in 1928, the Beavers continued to finish in the bottom half of the league.

Longtime head groundskeeper Rocky Benevento started working for the Beavers in 1927. Benevento was so popular with the fans that they took up a collection for him in 1956 to send him to the World Series. Benevento retired at the end of the 1966 season and was given a new car. When Benevento died in 1969, The Oregonian stated, "He adored kids...he loved baseball...and most of all he loved people." His funeral had an overflowing crowd that included Oregon Governor Tom McCall. Benevento stayed with the team 40 years, spanning 30 managerial changes and five ownership changes. While the former location of Vaughn Street Park is now a parking lot, there is a plaque honoring Benevento for his efforts in furthering baseball in Portland.

In 1929, the Beavers changed their name to the Portland Ducks, bearing a duck on their uniform, and were also occasionally known that year as the Portland Rosebuds. The name change did not change the team's luck as they finished with a 90–112 record. Long–time radio broadcaster Rollie Truitt also joined the Beavers staff in 1929, and worked for the team for 35 years, spanning 28 managerial changes and five ownership changes. Truitt would later be known as the "Dean of Pacific Coast League broadcasters". In 1930, the team reverted to the Beavers name, but would occasionally be referred to as the Ducks for over a decade. The highlight of the Beavers last place 1930 season was William Rhiel's unassisted triple play, the last recorded in PCL history.

In 1931, team President Tom Turner bought the franchise from the Shibe brothers and the team took a turn for the positive. Ed Coleman led the PCL in hits and runs batted in, and the team finished in third, winning 100 games. The team continued to improve in 1932, winning Portland its first pennant since 1914. The team finished second in 1933. Turner brought Walter McCredie back to manage the team in 1934, but he died early in the season, and the team fell to the bottom half of the league.

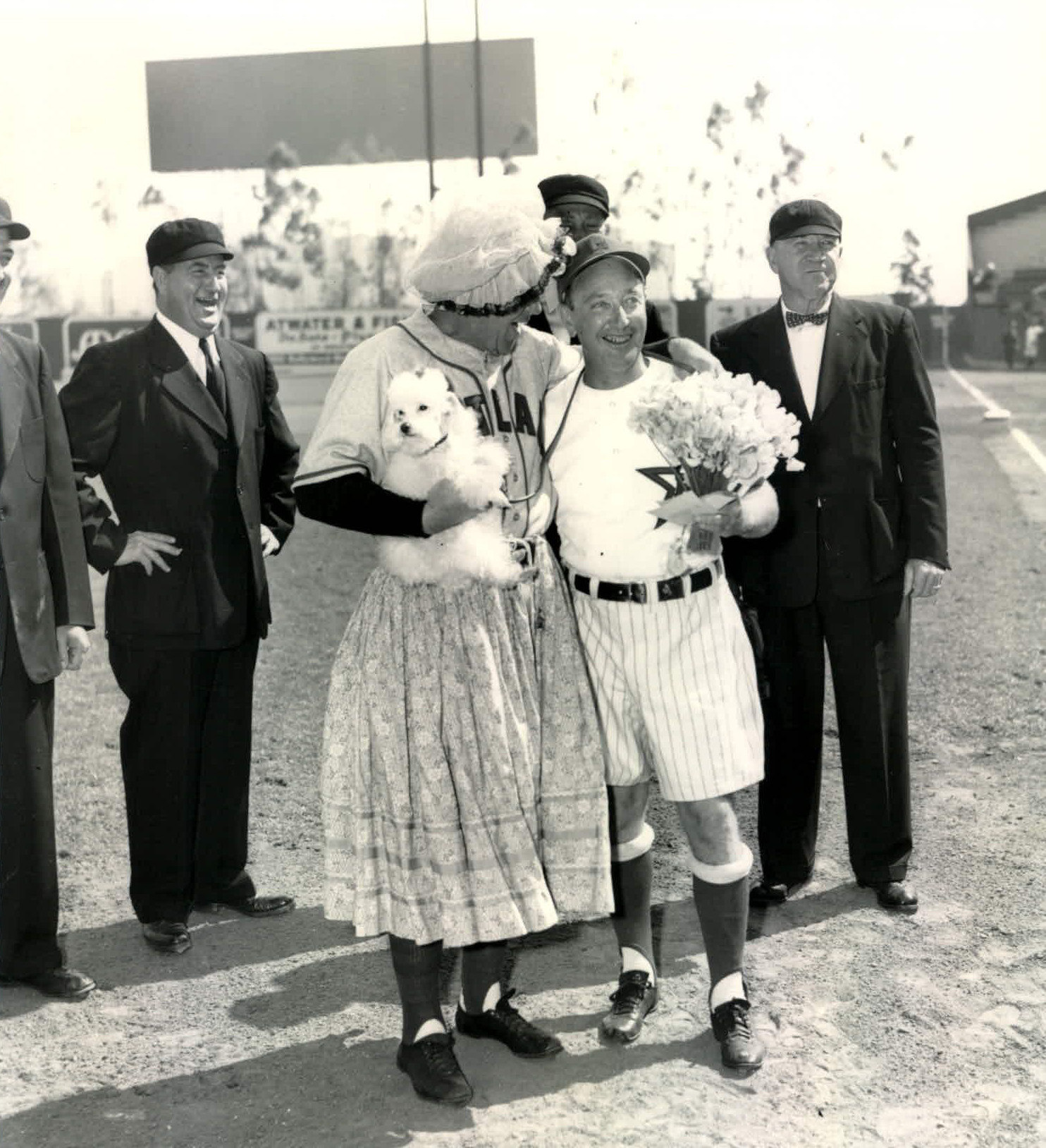
The Portland Beavers and Hollywood Stars managers before a game performing a comedy routine (Gilmore Field in the 1940s)

Following the 1934 season, E.J. Shefter bought the team from Turner. The team improved in 1935, finishing one game over .500, and then won the pennant in 1936, finishing 1½ games over runner-up Oakland, then winning the postseason series to capture the crown. In 1937, the Beavers finished in fourth place, but made it to the playoffs, defeating San Francisco in the first round before losing to the San Diego team featuring a young Ted Williams. The team finished sixth in 1938 before finishing in last place in 1939–1942. The 1940 team was so bad, finishing 56–122, that they were still 25 games behind the seventh-place team (the league had eight teams at that time).

In 1943, William Klepper, with partner George Norgan, buying a minority share, purchased the Beavers. The team came back that season with their first winning record since 1937. The management of the team began referring to the team as the "Lucky Beavers" and Vaughn Street Park was known as "Lucky Beaver Stadium". With the United States firmly involved in World War II, local radio station KXL sold over $300,000 in war bonds in 1943 to fund the building of a bomber for the war that would be dubbed "The Lucky Beaver". Due to U.S. involvement in the war, the available pool of baseball players in the nation was ravaged. Somehow, the Beavers still moved up in the league, finishing second in 1944. In 1945, the Beavers brought another pennant to Portland, being skippered by player-manager Marv Owen. Despite winning the pennant, the team lost to San Francisco in the first round of the playoffs. To commemorate Portland's 1945 pennant win, Portland held a banquet at the Multnomah Hotel (now the downtown Portland Embassy Suites). Oregon Governor Earl Snell presented a commemorative watch and gold and diamond ring to each player at the banquet. The watches were given to the players due to L. H. Gregory of The Oregonian requesting fans to donate money to a fund for the purpose. Gregory did this because he felt it was not right that no memento was given to the players from the 1936 championship team. Following the 1945 season, Norgan purchased Klepper's share of the team, becoming the team's new owner.

In 1946, the Beavers fell to the bottom half of the league, finishing in seventh place, 41 games out of first. In 1947, Eddie Basinski joined the Beavers, and they finished third, losing to the Los Angeles Angels in the first round of the playoffs. The team drew, up to then, a team record of 421,000 fans that season. This record would stand for the Beavers until the 2001 season when Triple-A Baseball returned to Portland.

In 1948, the team finished fifth, followed by a sixth-place finish in 1949. The 1949 season began the integration of the Pacific Coast League as Frankie Austin and Luis Marquez became Beavers. Beginning with the 1950 season, the Beavers finished fourth for four straight years. Clay Hopper, who had been Jackie Robinson's manager when he played for the Montreal Royals in 1946, was named the team's manager in 1952. This year also marked the first year the Pacific Coast League was classified by the NAPBL as an "open league." The open league was a step above Triple-A, and was an attempt by the Pacific Coast League to be considered the third major league.

Plans for a new ballpark were announced by the team in 1953. Originally, the team planned to build a new stadium at 82nd and Holgate in Southeast Portland. Due to the Korean War, among other issues, the stadium never came to fruition. In 1954, the team dropped again to the bottom of the league. After the 1954 season, the team went up for sale to the community via company's shares offered to the general public, which resulted in 2,400 new owners for the 1955 season. With the change, the Beavers rose to fifth place, only nine games back of first.

In 1956, the Beavers left the now-demolished Vaughn Street Park to move into 25,000-seat Multnomah Stadium, today's Providence Park. Throughout most of the 1960s, the Beavers were the Triple-A affiliate of the American League Cleveland Indians, nurturing such future stars as "Sudden" Sam McDowell, Lou "Mad Dog" Piniella, and Luis "El Tiante" Tiant. Later major league affiliations included the Minnesota Twins and Philadelphia Phillies.

In 1961, the Beavers signed the 56-year-old Satchel Paige. He pitched 25 innings for the Beavers, striking out 19 and giving up 18 earned runs without recording a decision.

Following the 1972 season, principal owner Bill Cutler moved the team northeast to Spokane, who had lost their PCL team to Albuquerque after the 1971 season. For the next five seasons, Portland was in the short-season Class A Northwest League (NWL) with the independent and non-conforming Portland Mavericks, owned by actor Bing Russell.

=== Triple-A returns to Portland: 1978–1993 ===
The PCL expanded in 1978 and added a new team in Portland, calling themselves the Beavers, displacing the single-A Mavericks. The new Beavers played in Civic Stadium for sixteen seasons through 1993. In 1983, the Beavers won the PCL pennant, the first for Portland in 47 years. Though tied for third overall during the regular season, the Beavers won the second half division title by four games, defeated first-half winner Edmonton Trappers in four games (3–1) to take the Northern Division title, then swept the three-time defending champion Albuquerque Dukes in three games in the finals to capture the league championship. As PCL champs in 1983, the Beavers participated in the first Triple-A World Series, a three-team round-robin competition in Louisville with the champions of the International League and the American Association. Each team played the others twice and it was won by the Tidewater Tides of the IL with three wins. Portland was second, splitting with both teams, and the Denver Bears were 1–3.

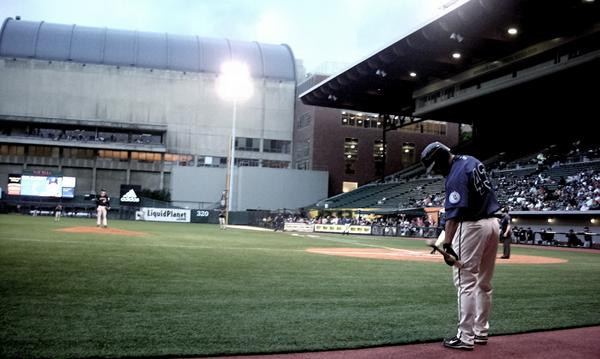
Vince Sinisi on deck in 2008

A decade later, Beavers owner Joe Buzas moved the team after the 1993 season east to Salt Lake City, where they became the Salt Lake Buzz in 1994 in a brand new ballpark. The team was renamed the Stingers in 2001, and have been the Bees since the 2006 season. For the first time since 1894, Portland was without professional baseball.

After being without a team in 1994, the Class A Rockies of the Northwest League relocated from Bend for the 1995 season. The Portland Rockies played in the Rose City for the next six seasons and served an important role for the city, whose demand for a major league team was growing. They were league champions in 1997. Portland's support for the Rockies paved the way for the return of the Triple-A PCL in 2001.

=== The Beavers return: 2001–2010 ===
Following the 2000 season, the Los Angeles Dodgers and San Diego Padres swapped Triple-A affiliates. The Albuquerque Dukes (a charter franchise of the PCL in 1903 as the Los Angeles Angels from 1903 to 1958, and later the Spokane Indians from 1958 to 1971) moved to Portland and became the Beavers, as the Padres' top affiliate. As part of the relocation agreement, Civic Stadium was renovated in 2000 and renamed PGE Park. The Las Vegas Stars (the 1919–72 Beavers) became the Dodgers' top affiliate; they were renamed the 51s for 2001. The single-A Portland Rockies moved up the Columbia River to Pasco and became the Tri-City Dust Devils in 2001.

In 2007, owner Merritt Paulson announced that he was considering changing the name of the team to prevent confusion with the Oregon State University teams from Corvallis. Possible new names and logos were unveiled, and a vote was staged on the team website. "Portland Beavers" won the contest, and the team unveiled new logos and colors on January 29, 2008. The Beavers emphasized their connection to the three prior franchises with the notation "Est. 1903" on their primary logo. The team also brought back the name "Lucky Beavers" as part of a sleeve patch on their alternate jersey.

==== Hunt for new stadium and team sale: 2009–2010 ====
In 2009, the city of Portland was awarded a Major League Soccer (MLS) expansion franchise for 2011, to be named the Portland Timbers. The Portland City Council approved a $31 million agreement to renovate PGE Park to a soccer- and football-only stadium, with the condition that a new ballpark be built in Portland for the Beavers by 2011.

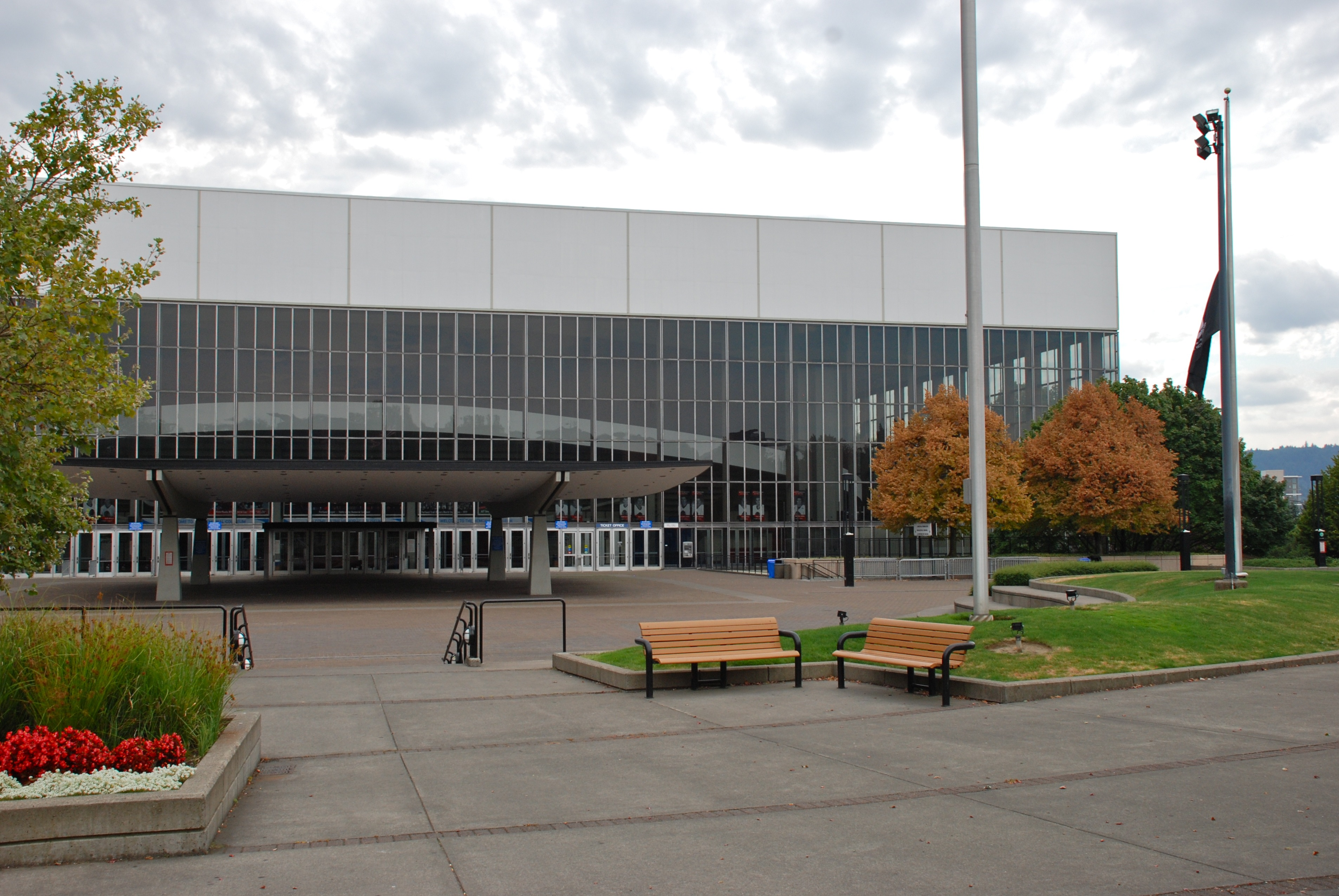
The Memorial Coliseum in the Rose Quarter was an original site for the proposed ballpark; however, it met public opposition.

Initial plans called for the new ballpark to be built at the site currently occupied by the Memorial Coliseum, which would have been torn down, but public outcry about demolishing a Portland landmark led Portland mayor Sam Adams to propose a second site in the Rose Quarter area north of Memorial Coliseum. The site, however, proved to be too small. Another location on the site of Charles D. Walker Stadium in the Lents neighborhood in southeast Portland was also rejected due to objections from neighbors. That was until the Portland Pickles collegiate wood bat team began play in 2016 at Walker Stadium.

In June 2009, the Portland City Council voted to separate the soccer and baseball projects, allowing renovation of PGE Park to proceed without completed plans for a baseball stadium in place. Other locations in the Portland area were considered for the ballpark, including a vacant terminal at the Port of Portland, Delta Park, the Portland Expo Center, Portland Meadows, the Westwood Corporation Heliport site, a building owned by Portland Public Schools near the Rose Quarter, and suburban locations in Beaverton, Clackamas, and Vancouver, Washington. None of these sites progressed past initial discussions.

With no suitable Portland location available, in July 2010, Paulson announced that he was putting the team up for sale and relocation. Padres owner Jeff Moorad formed a group to buy the team and talked of moving its home games to the Lake Elsinore Diamond in Lake Elsinore, California, until a new stadium in Escondido could be built. Eventually, the group decided to move the team temporarily to Tucson in 2011, rename them the Tucson Padres, with plans to move again to Escondido when a new ballpark was built. The plans in Escondido failed, and the team was sold again; they moved to west Texas prior to the 2014 season and became the El Paso Chihuahuas.

The Portland area was without minor league baseball in 2011 and 2012. After the 2012 season, the NWL Yakima Bears relocated to a new 4,500-seat stadium in the northwest suburb of Hillsboro and became the Hillsboro Hops.

== Notable alumni ==
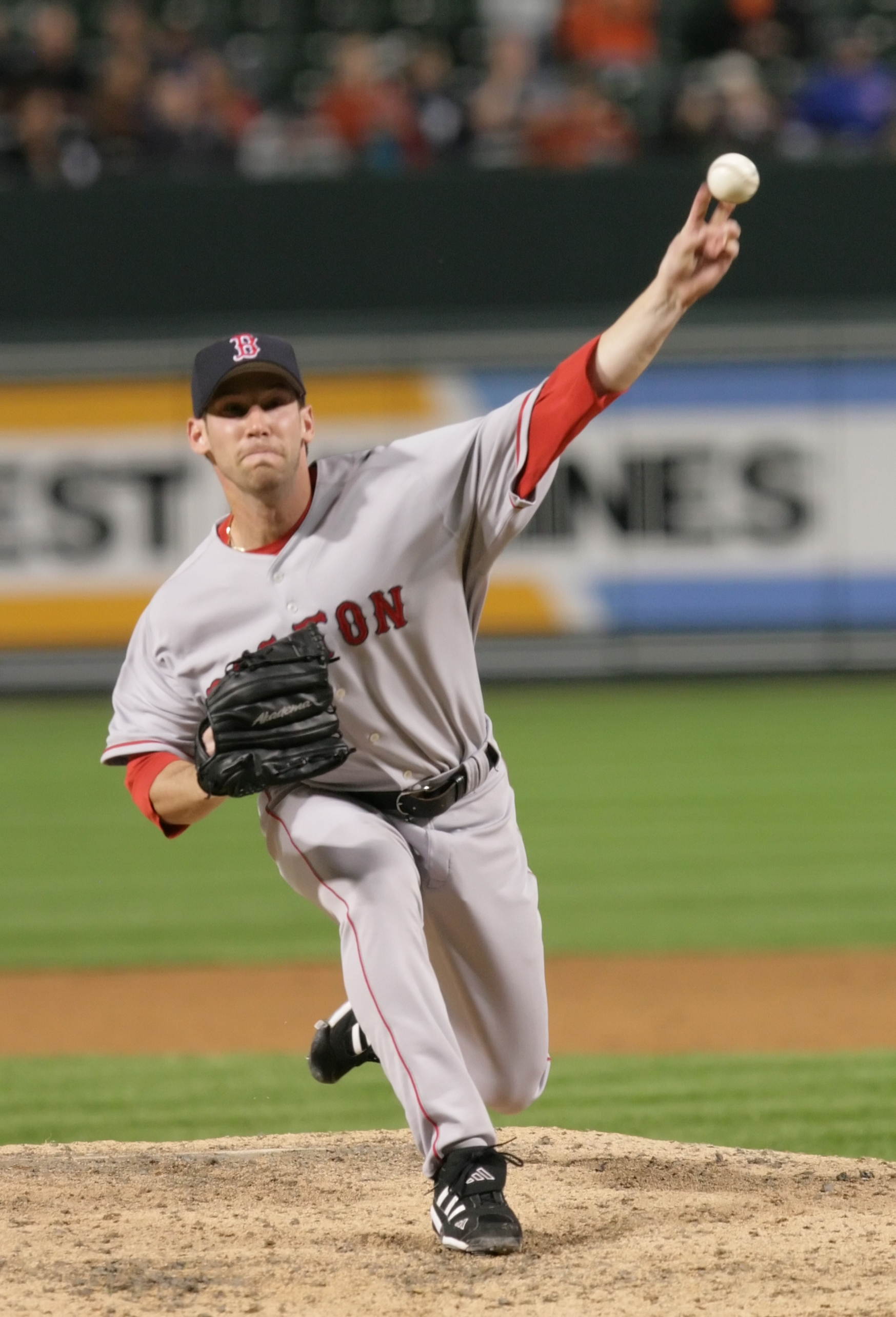
Craig Breslow

- Eddie Basinski, infielder, inductee in Pacific Coast League Hall of Fame
- Kyle Blanks, outfielder
- Craig Breslow, pitcher
- Sean Burroughs, pitcher, Olympic gold medalist in 2000
- Mickey Cochrane, Hall of Fame catcher
- Shawn Estes, pitcher, pitched in 12 games of rehab between 2006 and 2008
- Ray Fosse, catcher, 1967–1968
- George Freese, infielder
- Josh Geer, pitcher
- Chase Headley, infielder
- Ramón Hernández, catcher, played 7 games of rehab
- Tommy John, pitcher, 1964
- Wade LeBlanc, pitcher
- Pat Mahomes, pitcher
- Sam McDowell, pitcher, 8–0 1964
- Xavier Nady, outfielder and first baseman
- Satchel Paige, pitcher, 5 starts, 2.88 ERA
- Lou Piniella, outfielder, 1966–1968
- Aaron Poreda, pitcher
- Jeff Richards, a.k.a. Dick Taylor, shortstop; then became an actor
- Richie Scheinblum, All Star outfielder
- George Stone, AL batting title champion
- Luis Tiant, pitcher, 15–1 1964
- Jim Thorpe, outfielder and first baseman, 1922
- Will Venable, outfielder, current manager of the Chicago White Sox
- Ryan Webb, pitcher

== See also ==
- Portland Beavers players
- History of baseball in Portland, Oregon
- McCredie Springs, Oregon
