= John Paul Berry =

American Baseball Pitcher

John Paul Berry (January 17, 1918 – November 3, 1970) was an American professional baseball pitcher and first baseman in the Negro leagues. Berry played on the Kansas City Monarchs barnstorming team in 1935 and 1936, and briefly joined the club in 1945.
