= List of baseball parks in Tacoma, Washington =

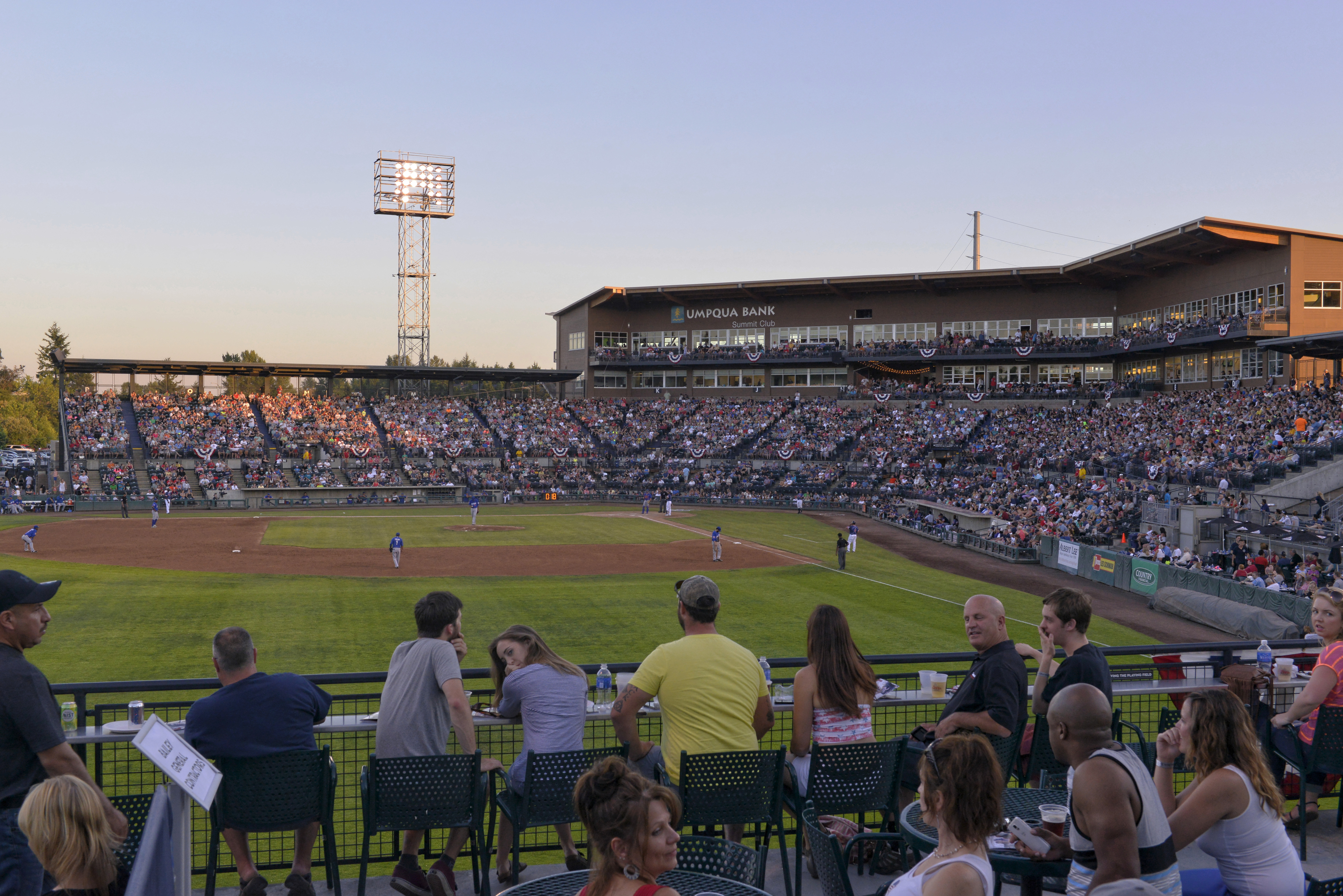
Cheney Stadium

This is a list of venues used for professional baseball in Tacoma, Washington. The information is a synthesis of the information contained in the references listed.

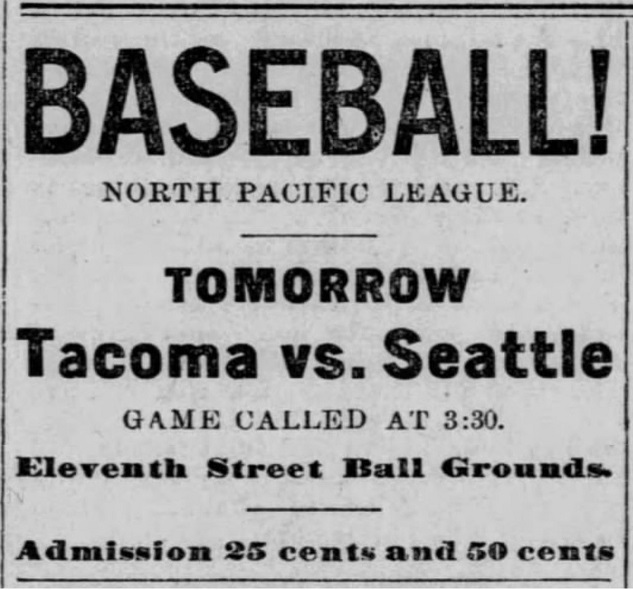
1896 advertisement

Tacoma Baseball Park aka the Eleventh Street Grounds

Home of:

Tacoma Tigers – Pacific Northwest League (1890–1892)
Tacoma Tigers – New Pacific League (1896) (folded mid-season)
Tacoma Tigers – Pacific Northwest League (1901–1902)
Tacoma Tigers – Pacific National League (1903)
Tacoma Tigers – Pacific Coast League (1904 – mid-1905) (moved to Sacramento)
Tacoma Tigers – Northwestern League (1906)

Location: South 11th Street (north, home plate); L Street (east, left field); 12th Street (now Earnest S Brazill Street) (south, center field); M Street (west, right field)
Currently: commercial businesses

Tacoma Athletic Park or just Athletic Park

Home of:

Tacoma Tigers – Northwestern League (1907 – mid-1917) (league failed)
Tacoma Cubs – Washington State League (1910)
Tacoma Tigers – PCL (1918)
Tacoma Tigers – Pacific Coast International League aka International Northwest League (1919) (league failed mid-season), (1920–1921)
Tacoma – WIL (1922) (league failed mid-season)
Tacoma Tigers – Western International League (1937–1942)

Location: 14th Street (north, first base); South Sprague Street (east, third base); 15th Street (south, left field); South State Street (west, right field); South Ferry teed into 14th near first base
Currently: Peck Athletic Fields

Tiger Park / Cheney Field

Home of: Tacoma Tigers – Western International League (1946–1951)
Location: 3801 South Lawrence Street (west); South 38th Street (north); South 40th Street (south)
Currently: commercial businesses

Cheney Stadium
Home of:

Tacoma Giants – PCL (1960–1965)
Tacoma Cubs/Twins/Yankees/Tugs/Tigers/Rainiers – PCL (1966–present)

Location 2502 South Tyler Street (east, right field); Scott-Pierson Trail and State Highway 16 (southwest, home plate and third base); Clay Huntington Way (north, left and center fields)

== See also ==
- Lists of baseball parks
