= Oakland Larks =

Negro league baseball team

Information
- League: West Coast Negro Baseball League (1946)
- Location: Oakland, California
- Established: 1946
- Disbanded: 1946

The Oakland Larks were a Negro league baseball team in the West Coast Negro Baseball League, based in Oakland, California, in 1946.

Pitchers Lionel Wilson, who went on to be Oakland's first African American mayor, and Sam Jones, who won 102 games in the Major Leagues, both played for the Larks.
