= Tom Parrott =

American baseball player (1868–1932)

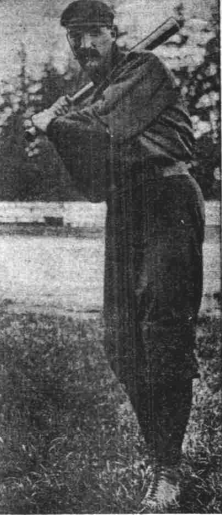
- Pitcher
- Born: April 10, 1868; Portland, Oregon, U.S.
- Died: January 1, 1932 (aged 63); Dundee, Oregon, U.S.
- Batted: Right Threw: Right

MLB debut
- June 18, 1893, for the Chicago Colts

Last MLB appearance
- September 26, 1896, for the St. Louis Browns

MLB statistics
- Win–loss record: 39–48
- Earned run average: 5.33
- Strikeouts: 166
- Stats at Baseball Reference

Teams
- Chicago Colts (1893); Cincinnati Reds (1893–1895); St. Louis Browns (1896)

Thomas William Parrott (April 10, 1868 – January 1, 1932), nicknamed "Tacky Tom", was an American professional baseball player. He was a right-handed pitcher over parts of four seasons (1893–1896) with the Chicago Colts, Cincinnati Reds, and St. Louis Browns. For his career, he compiled a 39–48 record in 115 appearances, with a 5.33 earned run average and 166 strikeouts.

As a hitter, Parrott posted a .303 batting average (299-for-986) with 40 doubles, 26 triples, 15 home runs, and 163 runs batted in. He also played 131 games in the outfield and 35 games in the infield.

Parrott was born in Portland, Oregon, in 1868 and died in Dundee, Oregon, at the age of 63. He grew up outside of Sherwood, Oregon. His brother, Walter "Jiggs" Parrott, also played Major League Baseball.

== See also ==
- List of Major League Baseball players to hit for the cycle
- List of Major League Baseball annual saves leaders

Achievements
Preceded by Sam Thompson	Hitting for the cycle September 28, 1894	Succeeded by Tommy Dowd
