= San Diego Tigers =

Information
- League: West Coast Negro Baseball League (1946)
- Location: San Diego, California
- Established: 1946
- Disbanded: 1946

The San Diego Tigers were a Negro league baseball team based in San Diego, California, that competed in the West Coast Negro Baseball League in 1946.
