= Ollie Beard =

American baseball player (1862–1929)

- Shortstop / Third baseman
- Born: May 2, 1862; Lexington, Kentucky, U.S.
- Died: May 28, 1929 (aged 67); Cincinnati, Ohio, U.S.
- Batted: Right Threw: Right

MLB debut
- April 17, 1889, for the Cincinnati Red Stockings

Last MLB appearance
- June 28, 1891, for the Louisville Colonels

MLB statistics
- Batting average: .270
- Home runs: 4
- Runs batted in: 173
- Stats at Baseball Reference

Teams
- Cincinnati Red Stockings/Reds (AA)/(NL) (1889–1890); Louisville Colonels (1891)

Oliver Perry Beard (May 2, 1862 – May 28, 1929) was an American Major League Baseball player who played shortstop for the Cincinnati Red Stockings/Reds from 1889 to 1890. He then played third base for the Louisville Colonels in 1891. Born in Lexington, Kentucky, it is claimed that his family invented the Kentucky version of the food, "Burgoo". In his three-year career, he led the American Association in games played with 141 in 1889, and twice finished in the top five in the league in triples. He finished his career with 331 games played, a .270 batting average, 195 runs scored, 34 doubles, 34 triples, and four home runs. He died at the age of 67 in Cincinnati, Ohio, and was cremated.
