= Abner Powell =

American baseball player (1860–1953)

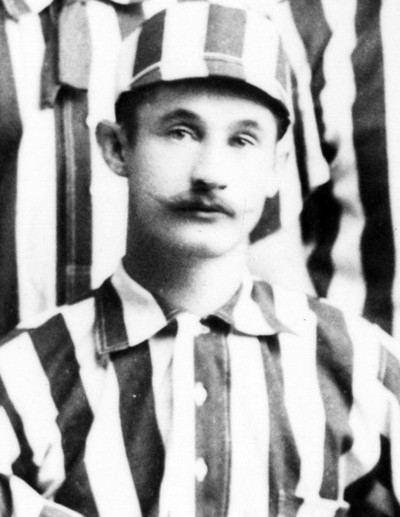
- Powell in 1890
- Pitcher
- Born: December 15, 1860; Shenandoah, Pennsylvania, U.S.
- Died: August 7, 1953 (aged 92); New Orleans, Louisiana, U.S.
- Batted: Left Threw: Right

MLB debut
- August 4, 1884, for the Washington Nationals

Last MLB appearance
- October 13, 1886, for the Cincinnati Red Stockings (AA)

MLB statistics
- Wins–Losses: 8-18
- Earned run average: 4.00
- Strikeouts: 97
- Stats at Baseball Reference

Teams
- Washington Nationals (1884); Baltimore Orioles (1886); Cincinnati Red Stockings (AA) (1886)

Abner Charles Powell (December 15, 1860 – August 7, 1953) was an American professional baseball player. Powell played in Major League Baseball for the Washington Nationals of the Union Association in 1884. He later played for the Baltimore Orioles and the Cincinnati Red Stockings of the American Association in 1886. He also managed and owned several teams, and is best known for his innovations as a manager.

== Personal life ==
Powell was born in Shenandoah, Pennsylvania He died in New Orleans, aged 92.

== Innovations ==
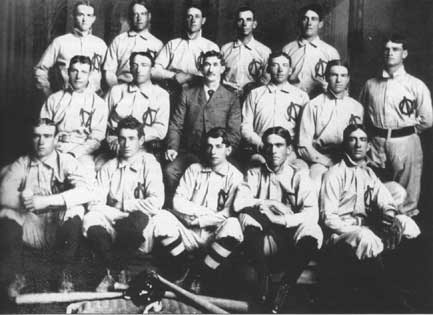
Powell at center in suit with the 1902 New Orleans Pelicans

Powell is credited with various innovations that changed baseball, though in many cases this is incorrect or overstated.

He is incorrectly credited with inventing rain checks and "ladies' day," but both of these were in use in New Orleans before Powell. Powell did improve the existing rain check system, however, by adding a perforated stub to tickets when sold so that only purchasers of tickets (and not other spectators, notably free-riders and fence-climbers) could get new tickets.

The idea of Ladies Day was to create an environment in the stands that would be free of unsavory characters and conduct, as well as to make baseball a family-oriented event; it dates at least to 1880 in New Orleans. Powell scheduled a recurring Ladies Day in 1887.

Powell is also credited with using an infield tarpaulin so that fields could be ready immediately after rain storms.
