= George Borchers =

American baseball player (1869–1938)

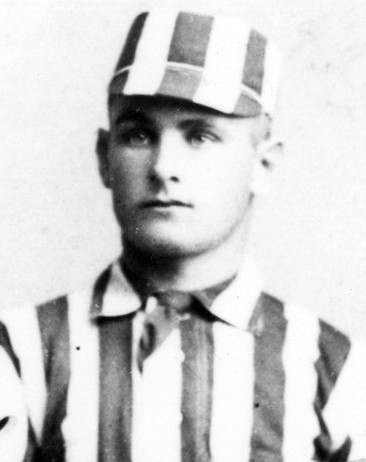
- Pitcher / Outfielder
- Born: April 18, 1869; Sacramento, California, U.S.
- Died: October 24, 1938 (aged 69); Sacramento, California, U.S.
- Batted: Both Threw: Right

MLB debut
- May 18, 1888, for the Chicago White Stockings

Last MLB appearance
- May 26, 1895, for the Louisville Colonels

MLB statistics
- Win–loss record: 4–5
- Earned run average: 3.72
- Strikeouts: 26
- Stats at Baseball Reference

Teams
- Chicago White Stockings (1888); Louisville Colonels (1895)

George Benard "Chief" Borchers (April 18, 1869 – October 24, 1938) was a 19th-century American Major League Baseball pitcher. In 1894 he led the pitching staff of the minor league Nashville Tigers with the most wins (11–14).
