= Los Angeles White Sox =

Information
- League: West Coast Negro Baseball League (1946)
- Location: Los Angeles, California
- Established: 1946
- Disbanded: 1946

The Los Angeles White Sox were a Negro league baseball team in the West Coast Negro Baseball League, based in Los Angeles, California, in 1946.
