= West Coast Negro Baseball Association =

One of the several Negro baseball leagues in the USA

- Classification: Minor league
- Sport: Negro league baseball
- Founded: 1946
- Folded: 1946
- No. of teams: 6
- Country: United States

The West Coast Negro Baseball Association (WCNBA) was one of the several Negro baseball leagues created during the time organized baseball was segregated. The WCNBA was organized as a minor league in 1946 by Abe Saperstein and Jesse Owens as a means to provide the west coast with a platform for African-American players. The league lasted about three months.

== League history ==
During World War II in the mid-1940s, the African American population grew as wartime jobs demanded workers to relocate to the shipyards and military institutions along the California, Oregon and Washington coasts. After the war ended in 1945, Eddie Harris and David P. Portlock began the process of organizing a Negro league in the area using the current minor league Pacific Coast League (PCL) stadiums while those teams were on the road. They reached out to Abe Saperstein to assist. Saperstein already owned a barnstorming team called the Cincinnati Crescents, which he moved to Seattle and renamed them the Seattle Steelheads. He knew Jesse Owens, the track and field athlete and four-time Olympic gold medalist, and asked him to join. Owens formed the Portland Rosebuds in Oregon. Saperstein was elected league president, Owens vice-president and Portlock secretary. A 110-game season was planned. However, the league survived for only about three months. Most teams played under 30 games and the league folded due to "poor attendance, a lack of financing, and difficulty in accessing ballparks." Seattle and Oakland continued the season playing local teams across the midwest.

== League franchises ==
The league was to be made up of six teams in cities with PCL stadiums. Originally, a team was slated to play in Fresno, a non-PCL city. They moved their base of operations to San Diego, but did initially play at least one game in Fresno. Oakland far outpaced the rest of the league in the shortened season, with Seattle and San Francisco finishing above .500. San Diego, Portland and Los Angeles rounded out the standings.

WCNBA Team	Home field	PCL counterpart
Los Angeles White Sox	Wrigley Field	(Los Angeles Angels)
Oakland Larks	Oakland Park	(Oakland Oaks)
Portland Rosebuds	Vaughn Street Park	(Portland Beavers)
Fresno-San Diego Tigers	Fresno Midget Auto Racing Park; Lane Field	(San Diego Padres)
San Francisco Sea Lions	Seals Stadium	(San Francisco Seals)
Seattle Steelheads	Sick's Stadium	(Seattle Rainiers)
