= Bozeman Irrigators =

- 1892–1909; (1892, 1909); Bozeman, Montana

Minor league affiliations
- Class: Class B (1892); Class D (1909)
- League: Montana State League (1892); Inter-Mountain League (1909)

Major league affiliations
- Team: None

Minor league titles
- League titles (0): None

Team data
- Name: Bozeman (1892); Bozeman Irrigators (1909)
- Ballpark: 1892 Unknown; 1909 Gallatin County Fairgrounds (opened 1903)

The Bozeman Irrigators were a minor league baseball team based in Bozeman, Montana. In 1909, the Irrigators played a partial season as members of the Class D level Inter-Mountain League. The Irrigators were preceded by an 1892 Bozeman team, which played as members of the Class B level Montana State League.

== History ==
Bozeman, Montana first hosted minor league baseball in 1892, when the Bozeman team became a member of the six–team, Class B level Montana State League, a league that played a split–season schedule. The Butte, Great Falls Smelter Cities, Helena, Missoula and Philipsburg Burgers teams joined Bozeman in league play.

Bozeman folded during the 1892 season. On July 23, 1892, the team disbanded at the start of the second half. Bozeman folded with an overall record of 10–8, playing the season under manager B.E. Vaile. The Great Falls Smelter Cities team folded from the league on the same day. The 1892 Montana State League finished the season schedule with four teams and folded after the season was completed.

Minor league baseball returned to Bozeman during the 1909 season. On July 10, 1909, the Boise Irrigators of the Class D level Inter-Mountain League moved to Bozeman to finish the 1909 season. Boise had compiled a 13–38 record when the franchise moved to Bozeman on July 10. Bozeman hosted their first home game on July 15, 1909. On July 25, 1909, the Inter-Mountain League disbanded during the season. The Boise/Bozeman team ended the season with a record of 16–41, placing fourth in the four–team Inter-Mountain League, finishing 22.0 games behind the first place Helena Senators. The team was managed by Con Strouthers and Joe Marshall.

Bozeman, Montana has not hosted another minor league team.

== The ballpark ==
The name of the Bozeman minor league ballpark(s) is not directly referenced. The Gallatin County Fairgrounds were in use in the era, first constructed in 1903. Still in use today, the fairgrounds host amateur baseball at Heros Park.

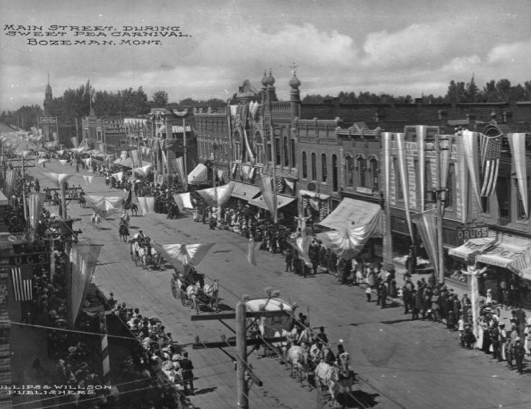
Sweet Pea Carnival parade. Bozeman, Montana

== Timeline ==
Year(s)	# Yrs.	Team	Level	League
1892	1	Bozeman	Independent	Montana State League
1909 (1)	1	Boise Irrigators	Class D	Inter-Mountain League
1909 (2)	1	Bozeman Irrigators	Class D	Inter-Mountain League

== Year–by–year records ==
Year	Record	Finish	Manager	Playoffs/Notes
1892	10–8	NA	B.E. Vaile	Team disbanded July 23
1909	16–41	4th	Con Strouthers / Joe Marshall	Boise (13–38) moved to Bozeman July 10; League disbanded July 25

== Notable alumni ==
- Pop Dillon (1892)
- Harry Gardner (1909)
- Charlie Hoover (1892)
- Joe Marshall (1909, MGR)
- Joe Miller (1892)
- Joe Moffet (1892)
- Con Strouthers (1909, MGR)

== See also ==
- Bozeman Irrigators players
