= Missoula Timberjacks =

- (1892, 1905, 1911–1913, 1925, 1956–1960); Missoula, Montana

Minor league affiliations
- Previous classes: Class B (1892); Class C (1956–1960); Class D 1911–1914); Independent (1900, 1905)
- Previous leagues: Montana State League (1892, 1905, 1925); Union Association (1911–1913); Pioneer League (1956–1960)

Major league affiliations
- Previous teams: Washington Senators (1957–1959); Cincinnati Reds (1960)

Minor league titles
- League titles: 1 1912
- Division titles: 1892

Team data
- Previous names: Missoula (1892, 1905, 1911–1913, 1925); Missoula Timberjacks (1956–1960)
- Previous parks: Campbell Field

The Missoula Timberjacks represented Missoula, Montana, in the Class C level Pioneer League from 1956 to 1960. Previously, Missoula played as members of the Montana State League (1892, 1905, 1925) and Union Association (1911–1913). Their best season was 1958 when they went 70–59 under manager Jack McKeon and had Jim Kaat on the roster.

The Missoula Timberjacks were an affiliate of the Washington Senators (1957–1959) and Cincinnati Reds (1960).

Baseball Hall of Fame members Clark Griffith and Jim Kaat played for Missoula.

== History ==
The Timberjacks were preceded by Missoula teams in the Montana State League (1892, 1905, 1925) and Union Association (1911–1913).

Missoula first began minor league play as charter members of the 1892 Montana State League. The 1892 Montana State League was six–team Class B league. The league played a split season. The Bozeman and Great Falls franchises disbanded on July 23, 1892, after the conclusion of the first half. The overall standings were Helena (29–21), Butte (26–22), Missoula (18–29) and Philipsburg (22–23). Bozeman had a record of 10–8 and the Great Falls Smelter Cities 6–10 when they folded. Butte won the first half championship and Missoula won the second half title. Butte won the overall championship. Helena allegedly forfeited over complaints regarding money and umpiring. Baseball Hall of Fame member Clark Griffith played for Missoula in 1892. It was reported Griffith pitched so well in one game that Missoula fans showered him with gold coins after the game. Griffith later bought property and built a home in Montana.The league did not return to play in 1893.

The Montana State League played a season in 1905. Butte, Great Falls, Helena and Missoula composed the league. No league standings or records are available.

Missoula captured the Union Association championship in 1912.

In 1925, the Montana State League played a final season as a four–team Independent minor league. Butte, Great Falls, Helena and Missoula played in the league, which has no official results.

The Timberjacks resumed play as members of the 1956 Class C Pioneer League.

Country singer Charley Pride played for the Timberjacks briefly in 1960.

Today, Missoula continues to host minor league baseball as home to the Missoula PaddleHeads, members of the Rookie level Pioneer League.

== The ballpark ==
The Timberjacks played at Campbell Field for the duration of their existence. Built in 1947, the original ballpark burned in 1969 and was rebuilt. Campbell Field is still in use today on the campus of the University of Montana.

== Timeline ==
Year(s)	# Yrs.	Team	Level	League	Ballpark
1892	1	Missoula	Class B	Montana State League	Unknown
1905	1	Missoula	Independent	Montana State League	Unknown
1911–1913	4	Missoula	Class D	Union Association	Unknown
1925	1	Missoula	Independent	Montana State League	Unknown
1956–1960	5	Missoula Timberjacks	Class D	Pioneer League	Campbell Field

== Year-by-year records ==
Year	League	Affiliation	Record	Finish	Manager	Playoffs/notes
1892	Montana State League	none	18–29	4th	Ed Cartwright / George McVey; Johnny Morin	Won 2nd half title
1911	Union Association	none	42–98	6th	William Joyce / Charles McCafferty	No playoffs held
1912	Union Association	none	83–51	1st	Cliff Blankenship	League champions
1913	Union Association	none	54–68	4th	Cliff Blankenship / Nig Perrine	No playoffs held
1956	Pioneer League	none	61–71	7th	Jack McKeon	No playoffs held
1957	Pioneer League	Washington Senators	62–64	4th	Jack McKeon	No playoffs held
1958	Pioneer League	Washington Senators	70–59	2nd	Jack McKeon	No playoffs held
1959	Pioneer League	Washington Senators	56–73	6th	Ralph Rowe	No playoffs held
1960	Pioneer League	Cincinnati Reds	58–71	4th	Rocky Tedesco	No playoffs held

== Notable alumni ==
- Clark Griffith (1892) Inducted Baseball Hall of Fame, 1946
- Jim Kaat (1958) Inducted Baseball Hall of Fame, 2022
- Cliff Blankenship (1912–1913, MGR)
- Pat Bohen (1913)
- Bullet Joe Bush (1912)
- Bobby Cargo (1892)
- Ed Cartwright (1892, MGR)
- Lem Cross (1892)
- Bert Cueto (1958)
- Rex Dawson (1913)
- Larry Foss (1957)
- Gus Gil (1960)
- Bill Goodenough (1892)
- Chuck Lauer (1892)
- Sheldon Lejeune (1905)
- Hap Morse (1913)
- Jack McKeon (1956–1958, MGR) Manager: 2003 World Series Champion – Florida Marlins
- George McVey (1892, MGR)
- Minnie Mendoza (1958–1959)
- Ollie O'Mara (1911)
- Nig Perrine (1912), (1913, MGR)
- Charley Pride (1960)
- Skipper Roberts (1912–1913)
- Phil Routcliffe (1892)
- César Tovar (1960)
- Harry Trekell (1913)
- Art Twineham (1892)
- Sandy Valdespino (1958, 1960)
- Jay Ward (1958)
- George Whiteman (1911)
- Carl Zamloch (1912)
- Missoula (minor league baseball) players
- Missoula Timberjacks players
