= Murray Infants =

- 1914; Murray, Utah

Minor league affiliations
- Class: Class D (1914)
- League: Union Association (1914)

Major league affiliations
- Team: None

Minor league titles
- League titles (0): None
- Conference titles (0): None

Team data
- Name: Murray Infants (1914)
- Ballpark: Murray Park (1914)

The Murray Infants were a minor league baseball team based in Murray, Utah. In 1914, the Murray Infants played briefly as members of the Union Association before folding during the season. The Infants hosted home minor league games at Murray Park.

== History ==
Before beginning minor league play, Murray first hosted semi–pro baseball teams, who played as members of the integrated Utah State Baseball League. On March 30, 1910, the Murray team played an exhibition game at home against the Chicago White Sox. Chicago won the exhibition game by the score of 8–0. The game was held at an alternate ballpark after the Murray Park became flooded.

Murray, Utah first hosted minor league baseball in 1914, when the Murray "Infants" became members of the six–team Class D level Union Association. Murray joined the Boise Irrigators, Butte Miners, Helena Senators, Ogden Canners and Salt Lake City Skyscrapers teams in beginning league play in 1914.

Beginning league play on April 28, 1914, the Murray Infants folded during the season. On July 20, 1914, the Murray Infants franchise folded, with the Boise Irrigators also folding from the league on the same day. The two teams folding left the Union Association with four remaining teams. Murray folded with a record of 31–42, playing under manager Cliff Blankenship. The Union Association folded on August 5, 1914, after the Butte franchise folded, reducing the league to three remaining teams. The final regular season records of the six beginning members were led by the Ogden Canners, who had a final record of 54–32, Salt Lake City Skyscrapers (52–34) and Butte Miners (44–40). They were followed by the Boise Irrigators (32–39), Murray Infants (31–42) and Helena Senators (27–53). After Murray and the rest of the league folded, the Ogden Canners and the Salt Lake City Skyscrapers played 16 games against each other to complete their seasons. Ogden captured the 1914 Union Association Championship at the conclusion of the season.

The Union Association permanently folded following the 1914 season. Murray, Utah has not hosted another minor league team.

== The ballpark ==
The home minor league ballpark for the 1914 Murray Infants was Murray Park. The ballfield was noted to be where the softball field is located in Murray Park today. Still in use today as a public park, Murray Park is located at 292 East Murray Park Avenue in Murray City, Utah.

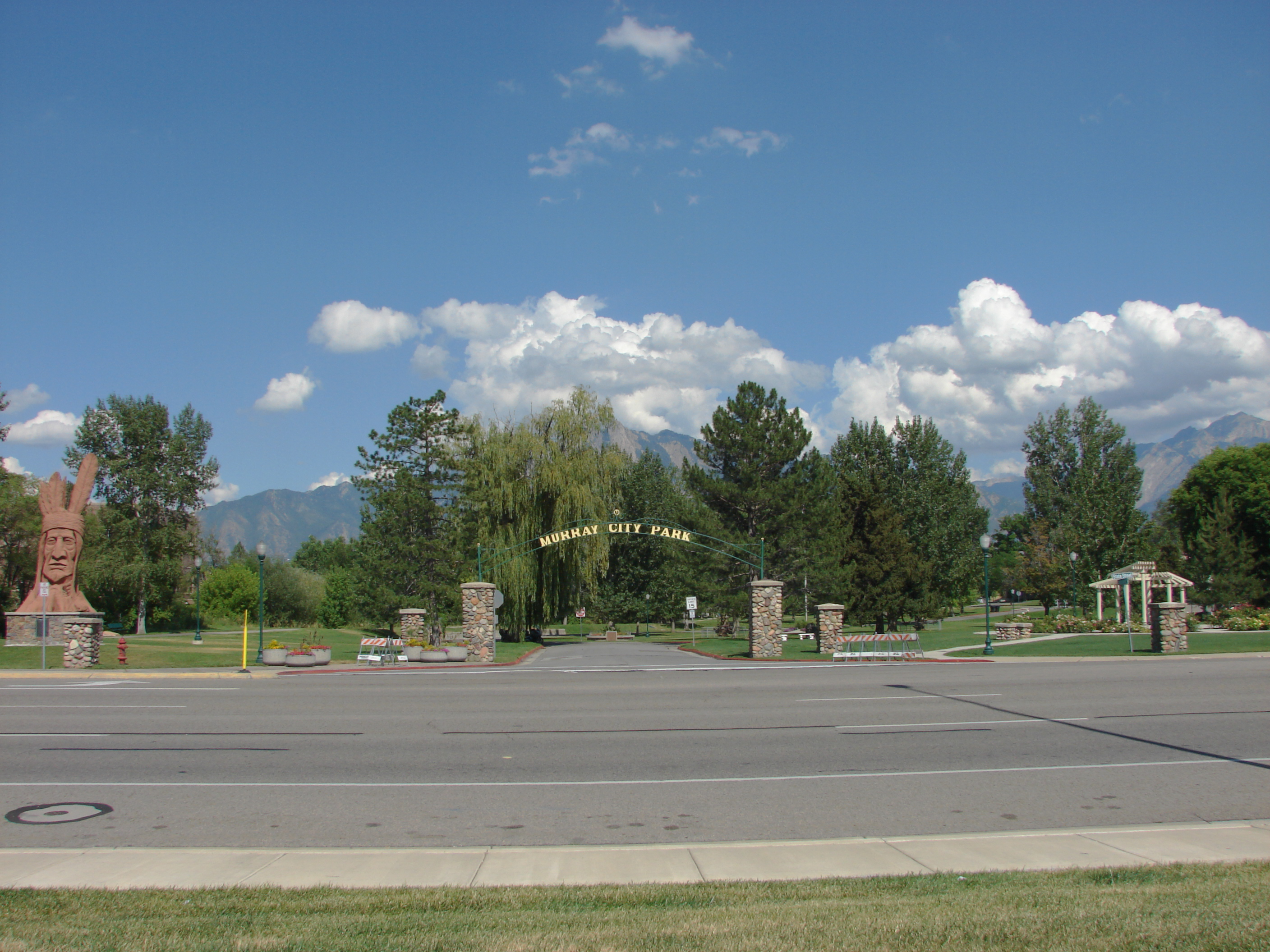
(2015) Murray City Park State Street entrance. Murray, Utah

== Year-by-year record ==
Year	Record	Finish	Manager	Playoffs/Notes
1914	31–42	NA	Cliff Blankenship	Team folded July 20; League folded August 5

== Notable alumni ==
- Cliff Blankenship (1914, MGR)
- Ike Caveney (1914)
- Rex Dawson (1914)

=== See also ===
Murray Infants players
