= Philipsburg Burgers =

- 1892; Philipsburg, Montana

Minor league affiliations
- Class: Class B (1892)
- League: Montana State League (1892)

Major league affiliations
- Team: None

Minor league titles
- League titles (0): None

Team data
- Name: Philipsburg Burgers (1892)
- Ballpark: Unknown (1892)

The Philipsburg Burgers were a minor league baseball team based in Philipsburg, Montana. In 1892, the Burgers played as members of the 1892 Class B level Montana State League.

== History ==
Philipsburg, Montana first hosted minor league baseball in 1892. The "Philipsburg Burgers" became members of the six–team, Class B level Montana State League, a league that played a split–season schedule. Franchises from Bozeman, Montana, Butte, Montana, Great Falls, Montana, Helena, Montana and Missoula, Montana joined Philipsburg in beginning Montana State League play on May 30, 1982.

The Philipsburg Burgers began league play on May 30, 1892. Philipsburg ended the 1892 season in third place with a record of 22–23, playing under manager Charlie Hoover. The Montana State League reduced to four teams during the season. The final overall standings were led by 1st place Helena (29–21), followed by Butte (26–22), Philipsburg (22–23) and Missoula (18–29). Bozeman had a record of 10–8 and the Great Falls Smelter Cities 6–10 when they folded during the season. Butte won the first–half championship and Missoula won the second–half title, with Philipsburg missing the playoffs. Butte won the championship playoff.

Philipsburg, Montana has not hosted another minor league team.

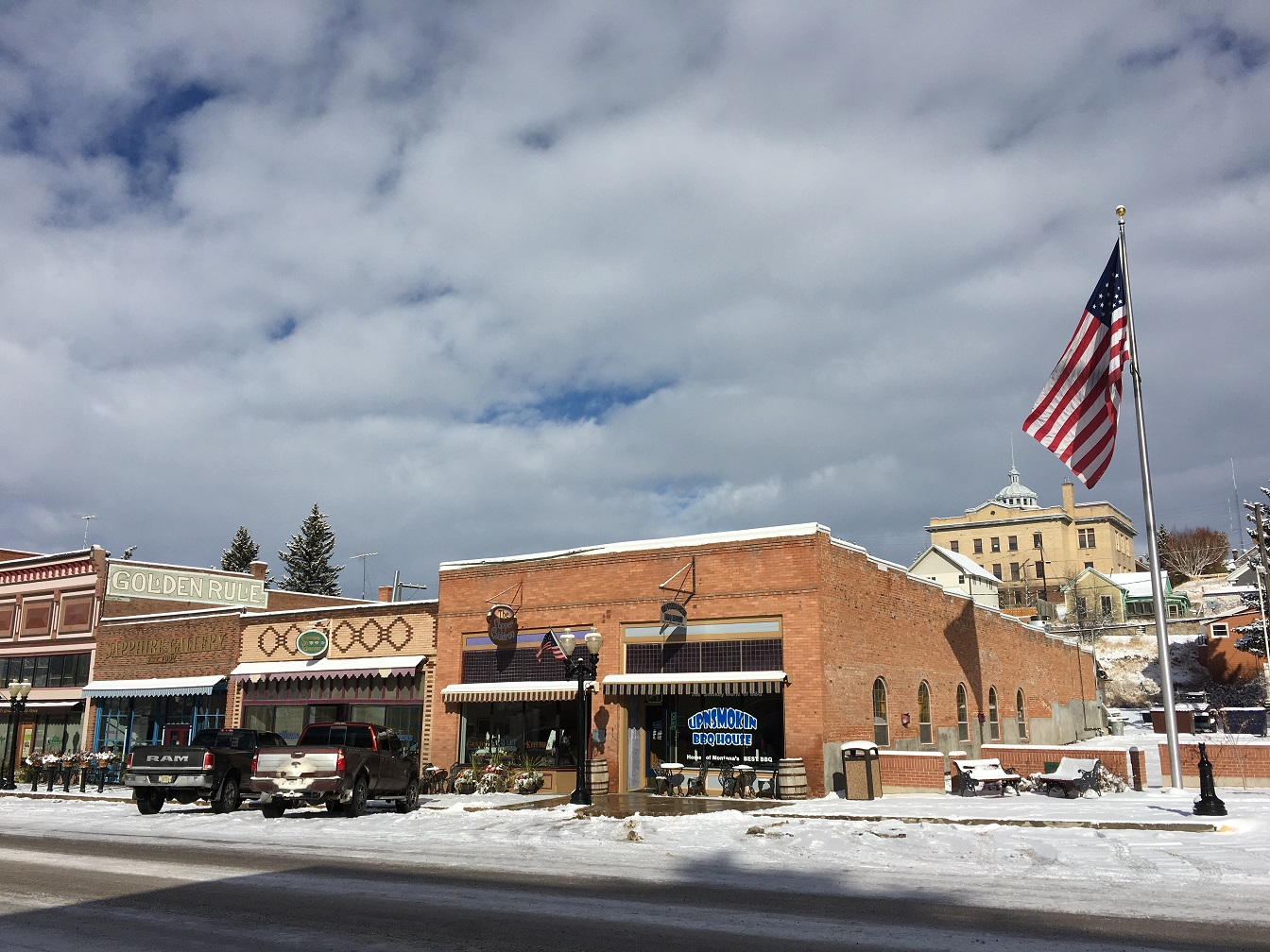
(2017) Philipsburg, Montana

== The ballpark ==
The exact name and location of the Philipsburg ballpark in 1892 is unknown.

== Year–by–year record ==
Year	Record	Finish	Manager	Playoffs/Notes
1892	22–23	3rd	Charlie Hoover	No playoffs held

== Notable alumni ==
- Charlie Hoover (1892, MGR)
- Pete Lohman (1892)
- George McMillan (1892)
- Tom Parrott (1892)
- Harry Raymond (1892)
- Guerdon Whiteley (1892)
- Philipsburg Burgers players
