= Anaconda Serpents =

- 1900; Anaconda, Montana

Minor league affiliations
- Class: Independent (1900)
- League: Montana State League (1900)

Major league affiliations
- Team: None

Minor league titles
- League titles (0): None

Team data
- Name: Anaconda Serpents (1900)
- Ballpark: Mountain View Park (1900)

The Anaconda Serpents were a minor league baseball team based in Anaconda, Montana. In 1900, the Anaconda Serpents played the season as members of the Independent level Montana State League. The Anaconda Serpents were the only minor league team hosted in Anaconda and played minor league home games at Mountain View Park.

== History ==
Minor league baseball began in Anaconda, Montana in 1900, when the Anaconda "Serpents" became members of the Independent level Montana State League. The Butte Smoke Eaters, Great Falls Indians and Helena Senators teams joined Anaconda in beginning league play.

The 1900 Anaconda Serpents had an overall record of 34–37 and placed third in the four–team Montana State League standings. Anaconda finished behind the first place Great Falls Indians (39–32) and Helena Senators (39–33) and ahead of the fourth place Butte Smoke Eaters (30–40) in the final standings. The 1900 Anaconda Serpents were first managed by player/manager John "Jack" Grim, who resigned to become an umpire in the league, being replaced as Anaconda manager by Dad Clarkson.

Jack Grim's resignation letter as manager of the Anaconda Serpents was reported to have said, "I cannot do myself justice while laboring under these conditions." Grim later went on to manage other minor league teams.

The Montana State League folded after the 1900 season. 1900 was the only season of play for the Anaconda Serpents and Anaconda, Montana has not hosted another minor league team.

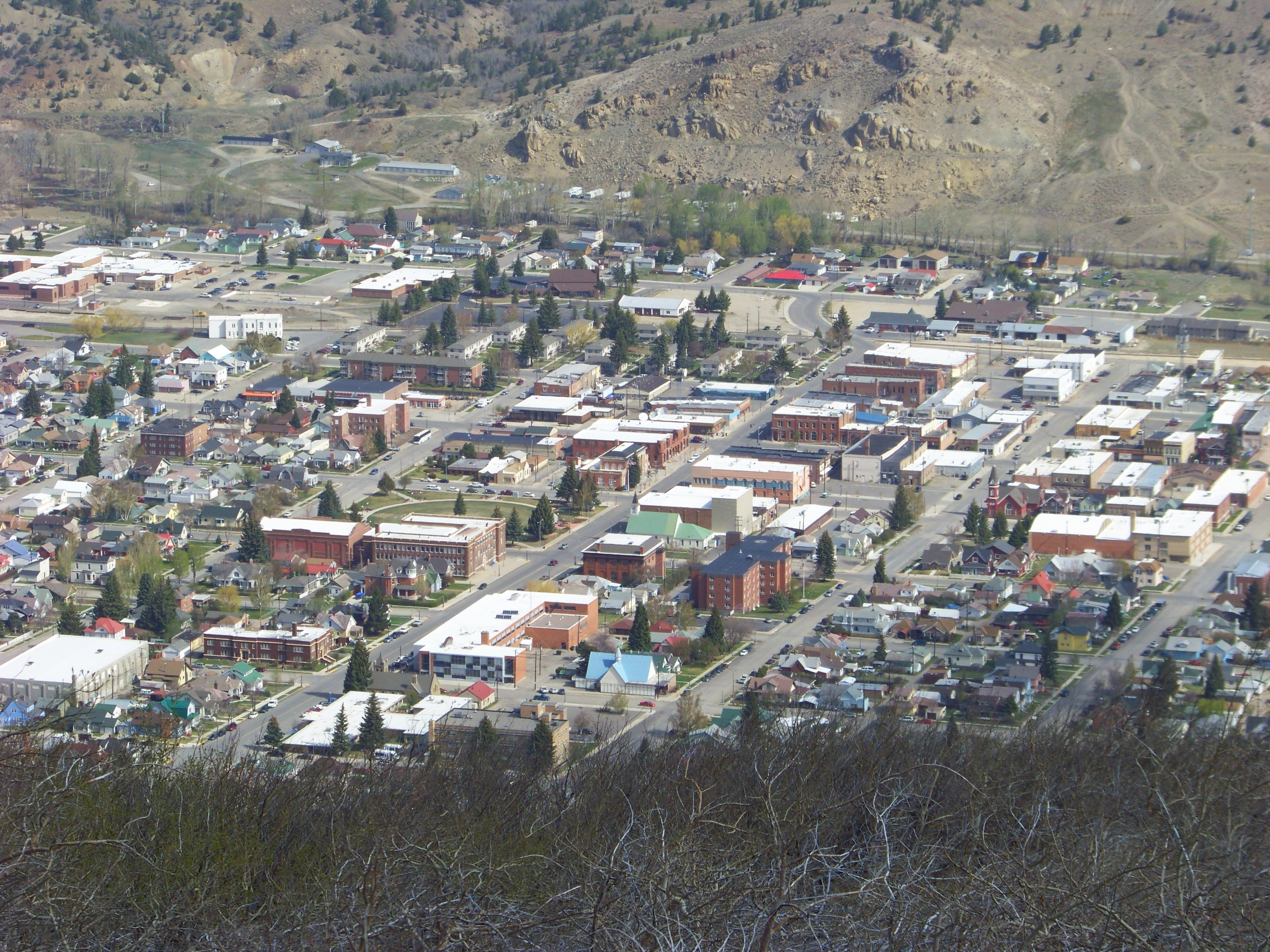
Downtown Anaconda, Montana

== The ballpark ==
The Anaconda Serpents hosted home minor league games at Mountain View Park. Cricket games were later played at Mountain View Park. Today, the park is still in use as a public park. Mountain View Park is located on South Alice Street in Anaconda, Montana.

== Year–by–year record ==
Year	Record	Finish	Manager	Playoffs/Notes
1900	34–37	3rd	Jack Grim / Dad Clarkson	No playoffs held

== Notable alumni ==
- Kid Carsey (1900)
- Dad Clarkson (1900, MGR)
- Walter Coleman (1900)
- Mike Lynch (1900)
- Jim McHale (1900)
- Charlie Swindells (1900)

== See also ==
- Anaconda Serpents players
