= Boise Yankees =

Coordinates: 43.602°N 116.186°W

- 1952–1953; Boise, Idaho

Minor league affiliations
- Previous classes: Class C
- Previous leagues: Pioneer League (1952–1953)

Major league affiliations
- Previous teams: New York Yankees (1952–1953)

Team data
- Previous parks: Joe Devine Airway Park (1952–1953)

The Boise Yankees were a minor league baseball team in the western United States, based in Boise, Idaho. They played in the Class C Pioneer League in 1952 and 1953 as an affiliate of the New York Yankees, and their home venue was Joe Devine Airway Park, named for the late Yankee scout Joe Devine in 1952.

== History ==
The team was previously known as the unaffiliated Boise Pilots from 1939 to 1951 (except for three years during World War II when the league did not operate), while the Yankees' affiliates in the Pioneer League were previously the Twin Falls Cowboys (1946–51) and the Idaho Falls Russets (1940–41). The Yankees pulled out of the Pioneer League and the western U.S. after the 1953 season. The Boise team's name reverted to Pilots for 1954, then was the Boise Braves (affiliated with the Milwaukee Braves) from 1955 to 1963.

A notable Boise Yankee was future country music star Charley Pride.

== Season records ==
Season	Manager(s)	W–L	Win %	Finish	Playoffs	Ref
1952	Wayne Tucker	63–69	.477	5th	none	
1953	Ted Gullic	63–68	.481	6th	none	

== Notable players ==
- Woodie Held
- Ken Hunt
- Johnny James
- Bob Martyn
- Charley Pride

== See also ==
- Boise Yankees players
