= Union Association (minor league) =

Defunct Class D minor baseball league existing 1911–1914

- Classification: Class D (1911–1914)
- Sport: Minor League Baseball
- First season: 1911
- Folded: 1914
- President: William Henry Lucas (1911–1912); Van Patte (1912); E. C. Mulroney (1913); Edward F. Murphy (1914)
- No. of teams: 8
- Country: United States of America
- Most titles: 2 Great Falls Electrics (1911, 1913)

The Union Association was a Class D level Minor league baseball circuit that operated from 1911 through 1914, with franchises based in Idaho, Montana and Utah. It was unrelated to the like-named 1884 major league.

== History ==
Beginning play in 1914, the Union Association was classified as a Class D league, based in the Rocky Mountains of the Western United States. The 1911 charter members were the Great Falls Electrics, Salt Lake City Skyscrapers, Butte Miners, Boise Irrigators, Helena Senators and Missoula.

Frank Huelsman was a star player in the league, completing the Triple Crown in 1911 and 1913, while winning three of the four league batting titles. The Salt Lake City, Helena and Ogden franchises played for the entire duration of the Union Association. On July 20, 1914, Boise and Murray disbanded, then on August 5, 1914 Butte dropped out, which led to the disbandment of the entire league. Despite the rest of the league disbanding, Salt Lake City and Ogden played 16 games against each other to complete their seasons.

== Teams ==
City	Team	Seasons
Boise, Idaho	Boise Irrigators	1911, 1914
Butte, Montana	Butte Miners	1911–1914
Great Falls, Montana	Great Falls; Great Falls Electrics	1911–1912; 1913
Helena, Montana	Helena Senators	1911–1914
Missoula, Montana	Missoula	1911–1913
Murray, Utah	Murray Infants	1914
Ogden, Utah	Ogden Canners	1912–1914
Salt Lake City, Utah	Salt Lake City Skyscrapers	1911–1914

== Champions ==
Season	Champion
1911	Great Falls Electrics
1912	Missoula
1913	Great Falls Electrics
1914	Ogden Canners

== Standings & statistics ==
1911 Union Association - schedule

Team standings	W	L	PCT	GB	Managers
Great Falls	90	46	.662	–	George Reed
Salt Lake City Skyscrapers	85	58	.594	8.5	Cliff Blankenship
Butte Miners	77	60	.562	13.5	John McCloskey
Boise Irrigators	64	78	.451	29.0	Hugh Kellackey
Helena Senators	60	78	.435	31.0	Charles Irby
Missoula	42	98	.300	50.0	William Joyce / Charles McCaffery

Player statistics
Player	Team	Stat	Tot	Player	Team	Stat	Tot
Frank Huelsman	Great Falls	BA	.411	Roswell Hildebrand	Great Falls	W	30
Howard Murphy	Great Falls	Runs	146	Amos Morgan	Salt Lake City	SO	267
Howard Murphy	Great Falls	Hits	220	Leo Dressen	Salt Lake City	PCT	.813 13–3
Frank Huelsman	Great Falls	RBI	125				
Frank Huelsman	Great Falls	HR	17				

1912 Union Association - schedule

Team standings	W	L	PCT	GB	Managers
Missoula	83	51	.620	–	Cliff Blankenship
Salt Lake City Skyscrapers	77	61	.558	8.0	Art Weaver
Great Falls	72	61	.541	10.5	George Reed
Ogden Canners	71	68	.511	14.5	John McCloskey
Butte Miners	53	82	.393	30.5	Charles McCaffery /Jesse Stovall
Helena Senators	50	83	.376	32.5	Charles Irby

Player statistics
Player	Team	Stat	Tot	Player	Team	Stat	Tot
Howard Murphy	Great Falls	BA	.390	Joe Bush	Missoula	W	29
Jacob Bauer	Salt Lake City	Runs	143	Joe Bush	Missoula	PCT	.709 29–12
Howard Murphy	Great Falls	Hits	240				
Frank Huelsman	Great Falls	RBI	114				
A.E. Spencer	Helena	HR	14				
Mike Killilay	Helena	3B	25				

1913 Union Association - schedule

Team standings	W	L	PCT	GB	Managers
Great Falls Electrics	78	42	.650	–	Harry Hester
Salt Lake City Skyscrapers	75	47	.615	4.0	John McCloskey
Butte Miners	54	64	.458	23.0	Arthur Merkle / Frank Kafora
Missoula	54	68	.443	25.0	Cliff Blankenship / Nig Perrine
Helena Senators	52	67	.437	25.5	Danny Shay
Ogden Canners	49	74	.398	30.5	George Knight / Dad Gimlin

Player statistics
Player	Team	Stat	Tot	Player	Team	Stat	Tot
Frank Huelsman	Salt Lake	BA	.423	Amos Morgan	Salt Lake	W	26
Frank Huelsman	Salt Lake	Runs	123	Pat Bohen	Missoula	SO	228
Frank Huelsman	Salt Lake	Hits	200	Amos Morgan	Salt Lake	PCT	.722 26–10
Frank Huelsman	Salt Lake	RBI	126				
Frank Huelsman	Salt Lake	HR	22				

1914 Union Association - schedule

Team standings	W	L	PCT	GB	Managers
Ogden Canners	54	32	.628	–	Dad Gimlin
Salt Lake City Skyscrapers	52	34	.605	2.0	Harry Hester
Butte Miners	44	40	.524	9.0	Ducky Holmes
Helena Senators	27	53	.338	24.0	Jesse Garrett / William Quigley
Boise Irrigators	32	39	.451	NA	Ervin Jensen
Murray Infants	31	42	.425	NA	Cliff Blankenship

Boise and Murray disbanded July 20; Butte disbanded August 5; League disbanded August 5.
Ogden & Salt Lake played 16 games with each other to complete their seasons; Ogden won 10 games and Salt Lake won 6.
Playoff: Ogden 4, Salt Lake 2.

Player statistics
Player	Team	Stat	Tot	Player	Team	Stat	Tot
Frank Huelsman	Salt Lake	BA	.424	Amos Morgan	Salt Lake	W	16
Swede Risberg	Ogden	Runs	84	George Knight	Ogden	W	16
Fred Carmen	Ogden/Boise	Hits	130	Tom Tomer	Boise/Salt Lake	SO	124
Frank Huelsman	Salt Lake	HR	23	Amos Morgan	Salt Lake	PCT	.762 16–5

== Sources ==
The ESPN Baseball Encyclopedia – Gary Gillette, Peter Gammons, Pete Palmer. Publisher: Sterling Publishing (NY), 2007. Format: Paperback, 1824 pp. Language: English. ISBN 1-4027-4771-3
