= Joe Devine Airway Park =

Baseball stadium in Idaho, US

- Location in the United States Location in Idaho
- Interactive map of Joe Devine Airway Park
- Former names: Braves Field (1955–1963); Joe Devine Airway Park (1952–1954); Airway Park (1939–1952)
- Address: 600 S. Walnut Street; Boise, Idaho, U.S.
- Coordinates: 43.602°N 116.186°W
- Elevation: 2,700 feet (825 m)
- Capacity: 5,000; 3,000 (1939)
- Surface: Natural grass

Construction
- Opened: 1939; 87 years ago
- Renovated: c. 1947
- Closed: 1963; 63 years ago

Tenants
- Boise Braves (PL) 1955–63; Boise Pilots (PL) 1954; Boise Yankees (PL) 1952–53; Boise Pilots (PL) 1939–42, 1946–51

Joe Devine Airway Park was a minor league baseball stadium in the western United States, located in Boise, Idaho. Opened in 1939, the ballpark was the home of Boise's teams (Pilots, Yankees, Braves) in the Class C Pioneer League, which briefly moved to Class A in 1963, the final year of the Braves and the ballpark.

Originally named "Airway Park," it was the home of the Pilots and was a few blocks east of the Boise Airport, then located at the present-day campus of Boise State University. The city donated 11 acres (4.5 ha) of the western portion of Municipal Park (now Kristin Armstrong Municipal Park) in 1939 for the ballpark.

North of the nearby Boise River, the elevation of the natural grass field was approximately 2,700 feet (825 m) above sea level, and it was aligned to the southeast; the recommended alignment (home plate to center field) is east-northeast. Opened with a seating capacity of 3,000, it was increased to 5,000 after World War II.

== Yankees ==
When the New York Yankees moved their Pioneer League affiliate from Twin Falls to Boise after the 1951 season, the ballpark was renamed in March to honor Joe Devine (1892–1951), a talented Yankees scout in the West who had played for the Boise Irrigators of the Union Association. The park was officially dedicated to Devine on Thursday, May 1, 1952.

== Braves ==
The Milwaukee Braves became the parent club in 1955 and the stadium was renamed "Braves Field." Boise's last season in the Pioneer League was 1963. Baseball broadcaster Bob Uecker was a catcher for Boise in 1956 and 1958.

== After demolition ==
The stadium was razed soon after the Braves departure and the site became the headquarters of the Idaho Department of Fish and Game. Subsequent minor league and independent teams have played at Borah High School's Bill Wigle Field and Memorial Stadium in northwest Boise.

== See also ==
- Boise Braves players (1955–1963)
- Boise Pilots players (1939–1942, 1946–1951, 1954)
- Boise Yankees players (1952–1953)
- Boise Hawks (1987–present)
