= Joe Devine (scout) =

American baseball scout

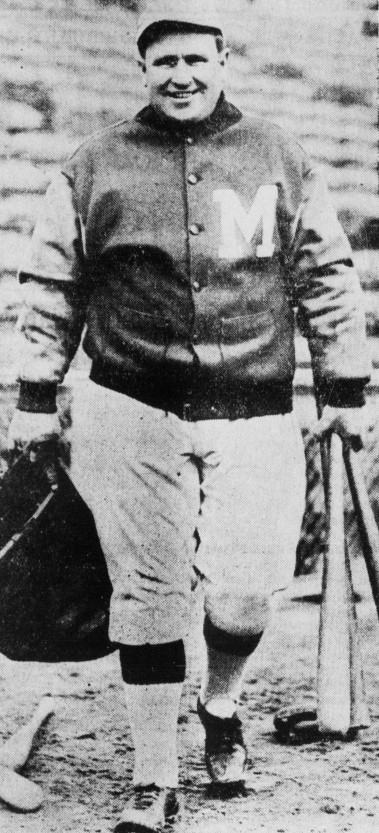
Devine as manager of the Mission Reds, circa 1932

Joseph Vincent Devine (March 3, 1892 – September 21, 1951) was an American baseball scout for the Pittsburgh Pirates and New York Yankees, credited for signing Joe DiMaggio to the Yankees.

== Baseball career ==
Born in Oakland, California, Devine was an outfielder in the minor leagues, and was on the spring training roster of the Boston Red Sox in 1917, but never advanced to the majors. He managed a local team in Seattle during World War I, scouted with Seattle Rainiers, and managed a baseball team in Calgary before joining the Pittsburgh Pirates organization.

After the Pirates he managed the Mission Reds of San Francisco. By 1932 he was hired by Paul Krichell to be the New York Yankees chief scout in the West. He also signed Andy Carey, Jerry Coleman, Fenton Mole, Johnny Lindell, Cliff Mapes, Charlie Silvera, and Leo Righetti.

== Scouting style ==
Devine's scouting style was similar to Krichell's; he not only looked for ability, but also checked a player's personality and character to see if they could handle the pressure of playing for the Yankees. He also looked for size, signing only two players under six feet (1.83 m) in height.

== Joe Devine Airway Park ==
Shortly after his death in 1951, the ballpark in Boise, Idaho, was renamed Joe Devine Airway Park. The team had just become a Yankees' affiliate and Devine had played for the Boise Irrigators of the Union Association.
