= Montana State League =

Minor baseball league

- Classification: Independent (1887, 1891); Class B (1892); Independent (1898, 1900, 1905, 1909, 1925)
- Sport: Minor League Baseball
- First season: 1892
- Folded: 1925
- President: William Henry Lucas (1900)
- No. of teams: 9
- Country: United States of America
- Most titles: 1 Butte (1892); Great Falls Indians (1900); Helena (1909)
- Related competitions: Northern Utah League

The Montana State League was a minor league baseball league that played various seasons between 1892 and 1925 as an Independent league. As the name implies, the Montana State League consisted of teams based in exclusively in Montana, with the exception of the 1909 season when Idaho and Utah were represented. The Montana State League played just the three documented minor league seasons and had several other seasons of professional play without official records.

== History ==
The Montana State League first began play as a non–classified league in 1887. The league also played a season in 1891. The teams are unknown in both seasons, with no official records available.

In 1892, the Montana State League reformed as six–team Class B level minor league. The league played a split–season schedule. The Bozeman and Great Falls franchises disbanded on July 23, 1892, after the conclusion of the first half. The overall standings were led by Helena (29–21), who were followed by the Butte (26–22), Philipsburg Burgers (22–23) and Missoula (18–29) teams. Bozeman had a record of 10–8 and the Great Falls Smelter Cities 6–10 when they folded. Butte won the first–half championship and Missoula won the second–half title. Butte won the overall championship. Helena allegedly forfeited over complaints regarding money and umpiring.

Baseball Hall of Fame member Clark Griffith played for Missoula in 1892. It was reported Griffith pitched so well in one game that Missoula fans showered him with gold coins after the game. Griffith later bought property and built a home in Montana.

After the 1892 season, there were strong allegations of betting and cheating. The league did not return in 1893.

The league played a season in 1898 with no records existing and the league was not classified.

In 1900, the Montana State League reformed as a four–team Independent minor league. The league president was William Henry Lucas. The overall league standings featured the Anaconda Serpents (34–37), Butte Smoke Eaters (30–40), Great Falls Indians (39–32) and Helena Senators (39–33). Helena won the first–half championship and Great Falls won the second–half title.

Baseball Hall of Fame member Joe Tinker played for both the Great Falls Indians and Helena Senators in 1900 at age 19.

The Montana State League played a season in 1905, Butte, Great Falls, Helena and Missoula composed the league. No league standings or records are available.

In 1909, the Montana State League played as a four–team league, adding teams in Idaho and Utah. The league comprised Helena (35–16), the Salt Lake City Cubs (34–17), Butte (20–31) and Boise (13–38).

In 1925, the Montana State League played a final season as a four team Independent minor league. Butte, Great Falls, Helena and Missoula played in the league, which has no official results.

== Montana State League teams ==
Team name(s)	City represented	Ballpark	Year(s) active
Anaconda Serpents	Anaconda, Montana	Mountain View Park	1900
Boise	Boise, Idaho	Unknown	1909
Bozeman	Bozeman, Montana	Unknown	1892
Butte, Butte Smoke Eaters	Butte, Montana	Mt. Columbia Grounds	1892, 1900, 1905, 1909, 1925
Great Falls Smelter Cities, Great Falls Indians	Great Falls, Montana	Black Eagle Park	1892, 1900, 1905, 1925
Helena, Helena Senators	Helena, Montana	Unknown	1892, 1900, 1905, 1909, 1925
Missoula	Missoula, Montana	Unknown	1892,1905, 1925
Philipsburg Burgers	Philipsburg, Montana	Unknown	1892
Salt Lake City Cubs	Salt Lake City, Utah	Unknown	1909

== Standings and statistics ==
=== 1892 Montana State League ===
Team	W	L	Pct.	GB	Manager
Helena	29	21	.580	–	Con Strouthers
Butte	26	22	.542	1	James Powell
Philipsburg Burgers	22	23	.489	4½	Charlie Hoover
Missoula	18	29	.383	8½	Marin
Bozeman	10	38	.208	NA	B.E. Vaile
Great Falls Smelter Cities	6	10	.375	NA	Meilli

=== 1900 Montana State League ===
Team	W	L	Pct.	GB	Manager
Great Falls Indians	39	32	.549	-	Kinsella / John McCloskey
Helena Senators	38	33	.535	1	Carl Wood; Paddy Ryan / Jack Flannery
Anaconda Serpents	34	36	.485	4½	Jack Grim
Butte Smoke Eaters	30	40	.428	8½	James Powell

Player Statistics
Player	Team	Stat	Tot	Player	Team	Stat	Tot
Charles McIntrye	Anaconda/Helena	BA	.441	Solly Salisbury	Helena	W	19
Dave Zearfoss	Great Falls	Runs	88	C.E. Wright	Great Falls	Pct	.696; 16–7
Dave Zearfoss	Great Falls	Hits	106	Bert Schils	Anaconda	HR	19

=== 1909 Montana State League ===
Team	W	L	Pct.	GB	Manager
Helena	35	16	.686	–	Unknown
Salt Lake City Cubs	38	33	.535	1½	Unknown
Butte	20	31	.392	7½	Unknown
Boise	13	38	.255	11½	John Strouthers / Joe Marshall

== Baseball Hall of Fame alumni ==
- Clark Griffith (1900), Missoula. Inducted, 1946.
- Joe Tinker (1900), Great Falls Indians & Helena Senators. Inducted, 1946.
