= Billy Smith (baseball coach) =

American baseball manager and coach (1930–2024)

- Coach
- Born: January 14, 1930; High Point, North Carolina, U.S.
- Died: July 7, 2024 (aged 94)
- Batted: Left Threw: Left
- Stats at Baseball Reference

Teams
- Toronto Blue Jays (1984–1988)

Billy Franklin Smith (January 14, 1930 – July 7, 2024) was an American professional baseball first baseman, outfielder, manager and coach. He threw and batted left-handed, stood 5 feet 9 inches (1.75 m) tall and weighed 160 pounds (73 kg) during his active career. Smith compiled a lifetime batting average of .312 in minor league baseball but he never climbed higher than the Double-A level.

== Biography ==
Smith was born in High Point, North Carolina on January 14, 1930. He graduated from Jamestown, North Carolina, High School and attended North Carolina State University. He played in the Boston/Milwaukee Braves' farm system from 1950 to 1954 and from 1956 to 1960, spending his last three seasons as the playing manager of the Boise Braves of the Class C Pioneer League. In 1959, he managed Boise to an 81–47 record and a runaway Pioneer League regular-season title, and led the league in hitting with a .390 mark. But his club fell in the first round of the playoffs to the Idaho Falls Russets. (His Boise club would win the playoffs in both 1958 and 1960, however.)

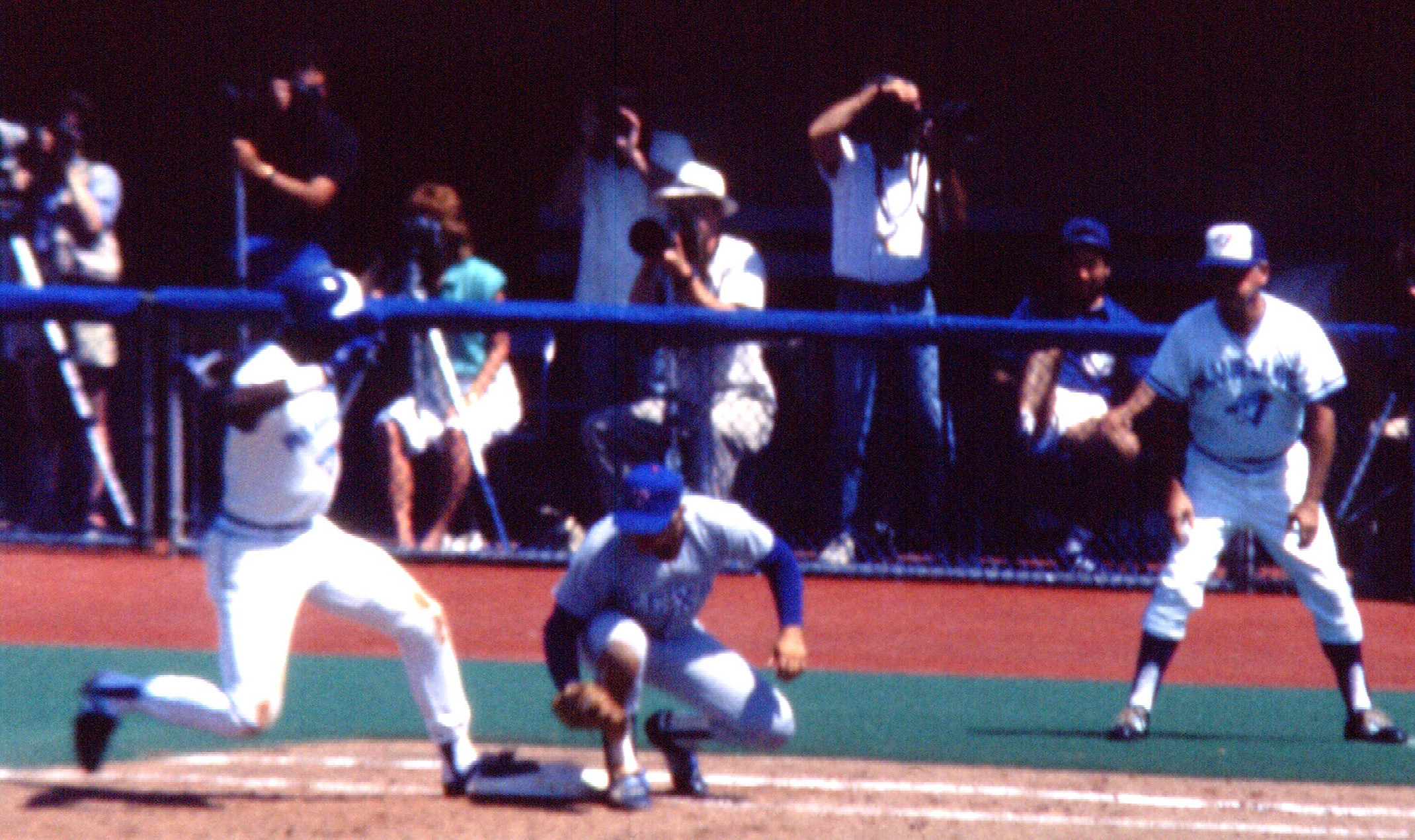
Smith (right) as first base coach of the Toronto Blue Jays during a game against the Texas Rangers at Exhibition Stadium in August 1985.

He scouted for the Braves from 1961–66, then switched to the Houston Astros' organization as a scout and minor league manager at the Rookie and Short Season-A levels from 1967 to 1979. In 1980, he became director of player development of the Toronto Blue Jays of the American League, serving in that post for four seasons before returning to uniform as a Blue Jay coach under Bobby Cox and Jimy Williams from 1984 to 1988.

Smith died on July 7, 2024, at the age of 94.

Preceded by Cito Gaston	Toronto Blue Jays first-base coach 1984–1988	Succeeded by Mike Squires
