= Joe Dawson (baseball) =

American baseball player (1897–1978)

- Pitcher
- Born: March 9, 1897; Bow, Washington
- Died: January 4, 1978 (aged 80); Longview, Texas
- Batted: Right Threw: Right

MLB debut
- July 4, 1924, for the Cleveland Indians

Last MLB appearance
- May 31, 1929, for the Pittsburgh Pirates

MLB statistics
- Win–loss record: 11–17
- Earned run average: 4.15
- Strikeouts: 62
- Stats at Baseball Reference

Teams
- Cleveland Indians (1924); Pittsburgh Pirates (1927–1929)

Ralph Fenton "Joe" Dawson (March 9, 1897 – January 4, 1978) was a Major League Baseball pitcher who played for four seasons starting at the age of 27. He played for the Cleveland Indians in 1924 and the Pittsburgh Pirates from 1927 to 1929. He was born in Bow, Washington and grew up in North Vancouver, British Columbia.

His brother, Rex, had a brief stint in the Majors.
