= Boise Braves =

Coordinates: 43.602°N 116.186°W

- 1955–1963; Boise, Idaho

Minor league affiliations
- Previous classes: Class A (1963); Class C (1955–1962)
- Previous leagues: Pioneer League (1955–1963)

Major league affiliations
- Previous teams: Milwaukee Braves (1955–1963)

Minor league titles
- League titles (3): 1956; 1958; 1960

Team data
- Previous parks: Braves Field (1955–1963)

The Boise Braves were a minor league baseball team in the western United States, based in Boise, Idaho. They played in the Pioneer League from 1955 to 1963 as an affiliate of the Milwaukee Braves. The team played at the Class C level for all but their final year, when they played at the Class A level. Their home venue was Braves Field, which had previously been called Joe Devine Airway Park.

== History ==
The team was previously known as the unaffiliated Boise Pilots from 1939 to 1951 (except for three years during World War II when the league did not operate), then the Boise Yankees in 1952 and 1953, and the Pilots again in 1954. As a Milwaukee affiliate for nine seasons, the Boise Braves won three championships, and reached the league finals two other seasons. After the Boise Braves' final season of 1963, the ballpark was demolished, and Boise was without a minor league team until the Boise A's of the Northwest League debuted in 1975.

== Season records ==
Season	Manager(s)	W–L	Win %	Finish	Playoffs	Ref
1955	Lou Stringer	77–44	.588	1st	lost in first round	
1956	Mickey Livingston; Robert King; George McQuinn	74–58	.561	1st	champions†	
1957	George McQuinn	56–70	.444	7th	none	
1958	Billy Smith	76–54	.585	1st	champions	
1959	Billy Smith	81–47	.633	1st	lost in first round	
1960	Billy Smith	78–52	.600	2nd	champions	
1961	Gordon Maltzberger	72–55	.567	1st	lost in finals	
1962	Al Unser	69–62	.527	2nd	lost in finals	
1963	Billy Smith	48–82	.369	5th	none	

† The league did not hold playoffs in 1956; the Braves became champions by finishing first in league standings.

== All-stars ==
Season	Name & Position
1955	Robert King, SS; Arnold Hallgren, OF; James Espinola, P
1956	Robert King, SS
1957	Robert Jacobi, OF
1958	Tom Brown, 3B; Bob Uecker, C Charles Holmes, P
1959	Kerry Buckner, OF; James Hay, C Leslie Bass, P
1960	Bill Lucas, SS; Ray Reed, OF; Dave Eilers, P
1961	Douglas Clayton, 2B; William Ryan, P
1962	Sandy Alomar Sr., SS; Marcial Allen, OF; James Handrahan, P

== Notable players ==
- Sandy Alomar Sr.
- Clay Carroll
- Tony Cloninger
- Bill Lucas
- Bob Uecker

== See also ==
- Boise Braves players
