= Carl Zamloch =

American baseball player (1889–1963)

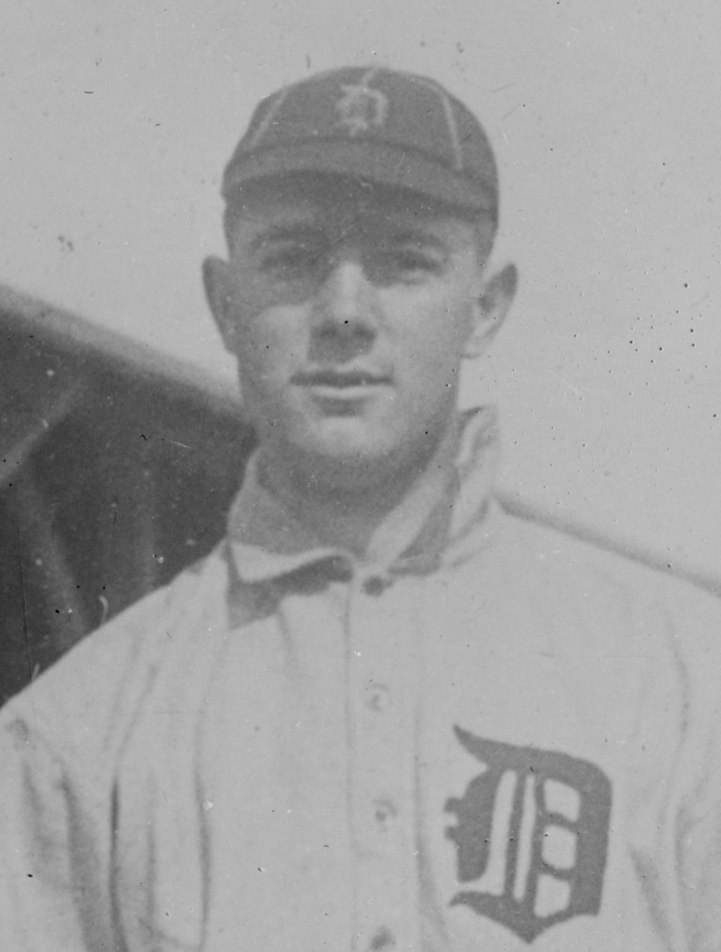
- Zamloch in 1913
- Pitcher
- Born: October 6, 1889; Oakland, California, U.S.
- Died: August 19, 1963 (aged 73); Santa Barbara, California, U.S.
- Batted: Right Threw: Right

MLB debut
- May 7, 1913, for the Detroit Tigers

Last MLB appearance
- July 9, 1913, for the Detroit Tigers

MLB statistics
- Earned run average: 2.45
- Win–loss record: 1–6
- Strikeouts: 28
- Stats at Baseball Reference

Teams
- Detroit Tigers (1913)

Carl Eugene Zamloch (October 6, 1889 – August 19, 1963) was an American baseball player, manager, and coach, and magician.

The son of famed magician Anton Zamloch, he performed as a boy in his father's vaudeville magic act. He then played professional baseball player for 20 years, principally as a right-handed pitcher, between 1911 and 1930, including one season in Major League Baseball for the Detroit Tigers in 1913. He compiled a 1–6 win–loss record and a 2.45 earned run average (ERA) in the major leagues. In nine minor league seasons for which records are available, he appeared in 154 games with a 25–25 record.

For 13 seasons from 1916 to 1917 and 1919 to 1928, he compiled a 146–91–7 record as the head baseball coach for the University of California Golden Bears baseball team. Zamloch also served as the manager of the Twin Falls Bruins in 1926 and the Oakland Oaks of the Pacific Coast League from 1930 to 1932. He was also a part owner of the Oaks from 1929 to 1934. He also performed for much of his life as a magician.

== Early years ==
Zamloch was born in Oakland, California, in 1889. His father Anton Zamloch was one of the most famous magicians (performing under the name "Zamloch the Great" and "Professor Zamloch") in the late 19th century and early 20th century. As a boy, Zamloch was the assistant in his father's magic act.

== Baseball career ==
=== Playing career ===
Zamloch began playing professional baseball in 1910, at age 19, as a left fielder for a team in San Leandro, California. He played in 1911 for the Sacramento Sacts and the San Francisco Seals, both of the Pacific Coast League (PCL). In 1912, he played for the Missoula, Montana team in the Union Association, appearing in 58 games.

In October 1912, Zamloch was sold to the Detroit Tigers. He made his major league debut with the Tigers on May 7, 1912, and appeared in his last major league game two months later on July 9, 1913. He appeared in a total of 17 major league games, 12 as a relief pitcher and five as a starter. His adjusted ERA+ was 119, and he ranked 10th in the American League with 11 games finished in 1913.

Although his major league career ended in 1913, he continued to play in the minor leagues for several additional years, including stints with the Denver Bears of the Western League in 1914, the Albuquerque Dukes of the Rio Grande Association in 1915, the Spokane Indians of the Northwestern League and Oakland Oaks of the PCL in 1917, Alameda of the Mission League in 1918, the San Francisco Seals of the PCL in 1919, the Seattle Rainiers of the PCL in 1920, the Calgary Stampeders in the Western International League in 1922, the Twin Falls Bruins (as player-manager) in 1926, and the Oakland Oaks for two final games in 1930. In his later years as a player, Zamloch served as a utility player. The San Francisco Chronicle in 1919 described him as "a valuable utility man, for he can pitch, play the infield or outfield, and he is a pretty fair hitter." In nine minor league seasons for which records are available, he appeared in 154 games and compiled a 25–25 win–loss record as a pitcher.

=== College coaching and military service ===
In February 1916, Zamloch was hired to coach the California Golden Bears baseball team. He continued to serve as Cal's head baseball coach from 1916 to 1917 and 1919 to 1928. For several years, he coached Cal through their season which ended in April and then played minor league baseball for the balance of the spring and summer months.

In 1917, he attempted to enlist in the United States Army following the United States' entry into World War I, but he was rejected because of the condition of his leg which had been broken three times during his baseball career. He served as the baseball coach at the University of Montana in late 1917. In January 1918, and although his enlistment had been rejected for medial reasons, he received an appointment as an athletic instructor to the Army under the supervision of the Young Men's Christian Association and was initially assigned to Fort Sam Houston in Texas. He was later appointed as the athletic director at the Presidio of San Francisco, training soldiers in basketball and indoor baseball.

Zamloch was released from the Army in January 1919. He returned to Cal, and during his 13-year tenure as Cal's baseball coach, his teams had a record of 146–91–7. In 1928, while coaching at Cal, he gained attention for developing "reversible baseball" which allowed a batter to run the bases in either direction (starting at first or at third base), provided that if there was already a man on base, subsequent batters had to run in the same direction chosen by the man already on base.

He was also the coach of the California Golden Bears soccer team from 1925 to 1931, and during Zamloch's time as head coach, the soccer team had a record of 34–17–7. He worked as an insurance salesman, and later as a stock broker, when he was not coaching.

=== Oakland Oaks ===
In October 1929, Zamloch and two others, A. Robert Miller and Victor Devincenzi, purchased the Oakland Oaks baseball team in the Pacific Coast League from J. Cal Ewing for a price estimated to be close to $500,000. As part of the acquisition, it was agreed that Zamloch would leave his position with the University of California and take over as the manager of the Oaks. His resignation as a coach at the university was accepted in early December 1929.

Zamloch served as the team's manager for three years, leading the Oaks to a 91–103 in 1930, an 86–101 record in 1931, and an 80–107 in 1932. After the 1932 season, Zamloch was removed as the manager of the Oaks. He also became involved in litigation with his former co-owners over claims that he failed to share a commission for the purchase of the club in 1929 and that he was owed salary for his service as the club's manager. In December 1934, Zamloch sold his stock in the Oaks to Victor Devincenzi.

== Professional magician ==
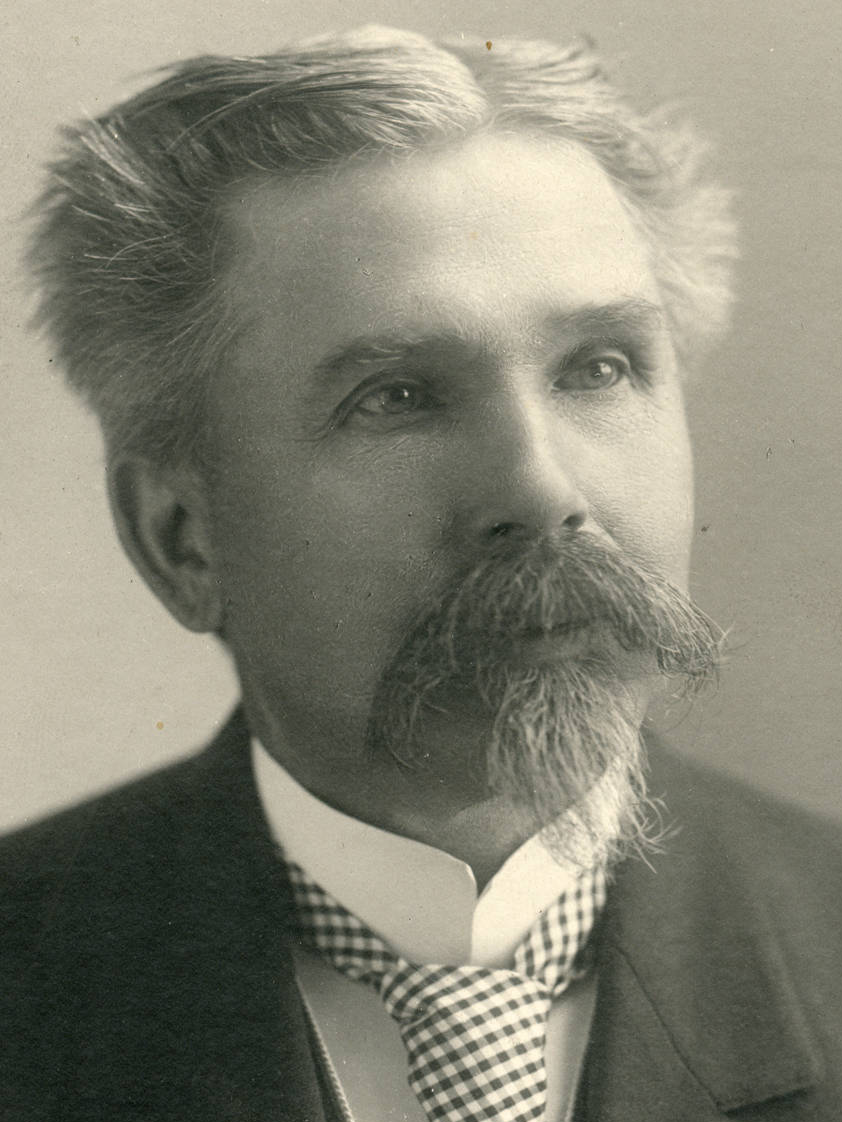
Carl Zamloch's vaudeville magician father Anton in 1907

Zamloch also worked and performed as a magician for many years. While coaching at the University of California in the late 1920s, he worked as a stock broker in the morning, coached baseball in the afternoon, and performed his magic act in the evenings. Zamloch reportedly was also adept at using "a bit of magic" as an ice-breaker in starting discussions with baseball prospects.

After his baseball career was over, Zamloch performed his magic act at schools, clubs, and other events. His acted included sleight of hand, card tricks, a spirit show, slate writing and cabinet tests, a mysterious trunk, a mailbag escape, driving a car on public street while blindfolded and guided by a "psychic sense," his father's Hindu rope trick, Houdini's needle and thread trick, the Egyptian fire trick, a Chinese silk and water feat, vanishing pigeons, and the mystery of the six boxes. In 1937, he published a book, "17 Simple but Mystifying Tricks to Entertain Your Friends", under the pseudonym "The Great Zam."

== Later years ==
From 1936 until his death in 1963, he worked as a sales executive and legislative consultant for the Signal Oil and Gas Company. He died in August 1963 at age 73 in Santa Barbara, California. He had been hospitalized at Santa Barbara Cottage Hospital for several weeks after suffering a stroke on July 3, 1963. He was buried at Sunset View Cemetery in El Cerrito, California.

== Head coaching record ==
=== College baseball ===
Record table
Season	Team	Overall	Conference	Standing	Postseason
California Golden Bears (Pacific Coast Conference) (1916–1917)
1916	California	11–11–2	3–0	1st	
1917	California	12–8–1	3–0	1st	
California Golden Bears (Pacific Coast Conference) (1919–1929)
1919	California	7–5	0–2	6th	
1920	California	22–10–1	5–1	1st	
1921	California	10–8–1	3–0	1st	
1922	California	12–6–1	2–1	2nd	
1923	California	12–7–1	3–0	1st (South)	
1924	California	13–11	3–3	T–1st	
1925	California	11–2	1–2	2nd (South)	
1926	California	8–6	4–2	1st (South)	
1927	California	4–9	4–8	5th (CIBA)	
1928	California	8–4	8–4	2nd (CIBA)	
1929	California	16–7	11–3	1st (CIBA)	
California:		146–91–7	50–26		
Total:		146–91–7			
National champion Postseason invitational champion Conference regular season champion Conference regular season and conference tournament champion Division regular season champion Division regular season and conference tournament champion Conference tournament champion
