= Johnny Broaca =

American baseball player (1909–1985)

- Pitcher
- Born: October 3, 1909; Lawrence, Massachusetts, U.S.
- Died: May 16, 1985 (aged 75); Lawrence, Massachusetts, U.S.
- Batted: Right Threw: Right

MLB debut
- June 2, 1934, for the New York Yankees

Last MLB appearance
- September 23, 1939, for the Cleveland Indians

MLB statistics
- Win–loss record: 44–29
- Earned run average: 4.08
- Strikeouts: 258
- Stats at Baseball Reference

Teams
- New York Yankees (1934–1937); Cleveland Indians (1939)

Career highlights and awards
- World Series champion (1936)

John Joseph Broaca (October 3, 1909 – May 16, 1985) was an American professional baseball pitcher from 1934 to 1939. Broaca won at least 12 games for the New York Yankees his first three seasons. However, in 1937, Broaca took a leave of absence for no apparent reason and only pitched in 7 games. He did not pitch at all in 1938, and in 1939 he played briefly with the Cleveland Indians. His lifetime record as a pitcher for the New York Yankees and Cleveland Indians was 44–29.

== Biography ==
Johnny was born in Lawrence, Massachusetts to Lithuanian immigrants. He attended Lawrence High School, but transferred to and graduated from Phillips Academy Andover after two years. He continued his education at Yale University. While at Yale, he was a tri-sport athlete, competing in baseball, boxing, and track. While a student at Yale, Broaca spent the summers of 1930 to 1932 playing for the Orleans town team in the Cape Cod Baseball League. His baseball coach at Yale was former Boston Red Sox pitching star Smoky Joe Wood.

Despite being suspended for his entire senior season for refusing to take part in a May exhibition game, Broaca attracted the attention of legendary Yankee scout Paul Krichell. He signed with the Yankees that summer, and soon afterward was sent to their top minor league affiliate, the Newark Bears of the International League. A 7-2 record with a 2.04 ERA seemingly assured him of making the major league roster, but he missed his first major league spring training in order to finish work on his English degree at Yale. He then traveled to Yankee Stadium for a weekend workout, and fellow Ivy Leaguer Lou Gehrig persuaded manager Joe McCarthy that he was ready for the majors.

Broaca didn't disappoint in his rookie season, going 12–9 as a starter with an earned run average of 4.16. In 1935, he had his most successful statistical season, where he went 15–7 with an ERA of 3.58. In 1936, the year the Yankees won the World Series, Broaca was 12–7 with an ERA of 4.24.

In 1937, after starting the season with a disappointing 1–4 record, Broaca abruptly left the team with his wife eight months pregnant—becoming the first player to jump the team in at least a quarter-century. He was only heard from again in September, when his wife filed for divorce on grounds of severe abuse at his hands; she claimed he went into fits of rage and started beating her a month into their marriage. The Yankees were so outraged by what emerged in the trial that they voted Broaca's wife a $1,000 World Series share. His hiatus from baseball extended into the entire 1938 season.

Broaca had a brief stint as a professional boxer in 1938, but failed to win a single bout. His father died the same year. The Yankees were willing to bring him back in 1938, but refused to cover his medical expenses, as he was demanding. He was reinstated by Commissioner Kenesaw Mountain Landis in early November 1938. The Yankees promptly waived him, and he was claimed by the Cleveland Indians for $7,500. After a brief holdout, he signed an $8,000 contract. The Indians used him primarily as a reliever, and he appeared in 22 games with a 4–2 record while logging 28 walks against 13 strikeouts. However, by this time it was apparent his arm was giving out; he'd had arm trouble since at least his collegiate days.

He reported to spring training in 1940 despite turning down a substantial pay cut. On April 15, he was traded to the New York Giants, However, by this time it was obvious he was finished. The Giants traded him back to the Indians in June before he ever pitched for them, and the Indians promptly released him.

After working on the home front in World War II, Broaca spent most of the rest of his life as a common laborer on road construction crews in and around Lawrence, walking almost everywhere that was within reasonable walking distance. His coworkers learned early on never to ask him about baseball. He died in 1985, having not spoken to his son, Peter, in almost half a century even though Peter lived in Boston's South End, only 25 miles away.
