= Anton Zamloch =

American magician

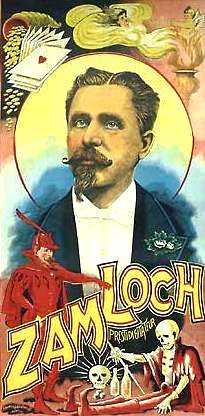
Zamloch the Great

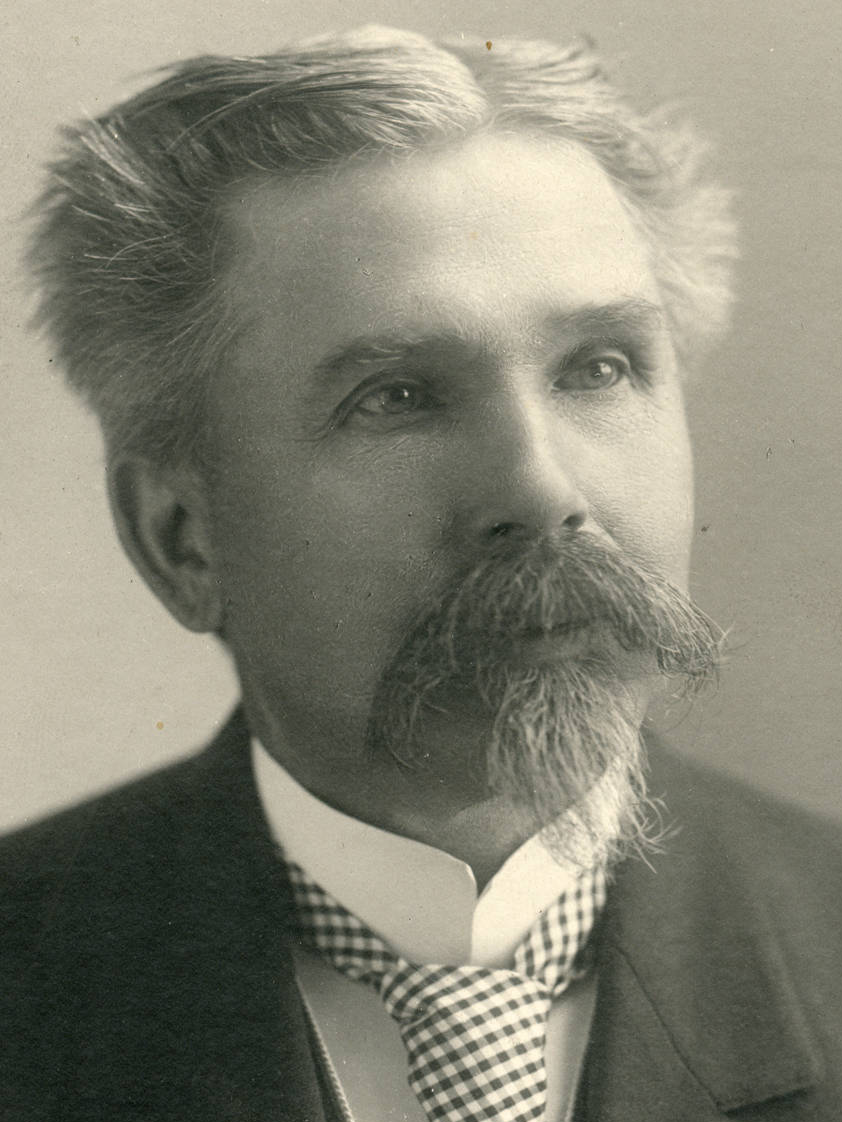
Anton Zamloch (1907)

Anton Zamloch, also known as “Professor Zamloch” and “Zamloch the Great,” was an American magician who toured with his magic act from 1869 through 1912. Zamloch performed at mining camp “opera houses” in the wild west, New York theaters and locations in Mexico, Hawaii, Canada and across the United States. His act grew to a large size, and he traveled with three assistants and “over a ton of baggage.” Some newspaper accounts described him as “the greatest magician of the age.”

== Early years touring the west ==
In the early years of his career, Zamloch toured mining towns and other locales in the western United States.

The first press report found on Zamloch was a review in the Morning Oregonian on November 11, 1874, reporting that “Prof. Zamloch, the clever magician, made his professional appearance for the first time in Portland, and gave a number of good tricks.” In October 1879, the Oakland Tribune reported on Zamloch's performances at the Dietz Opera House: “The continued success which Zamloch the magician has met with at Dietz Opera House this week is almost unprecedented in the history of public entertainments given in Oakland. . . . . His extravaganzas of magic were so swiftly executed and so mysteriously subtle that two centuries ago he could have been richly deserved being burned at the stake as a necromancer of the blackest arts and disciple of his satanic majesty. But at this advanced age in anno domini 1879 he is a pleasant gentleman and harmless entertainer. The world does move.”

In 1881, he visited southern Utah. To secure publicity for his shows, he went to the office of the local newspaper, The Silver Reef Miner. Supposing it would amuse the editorial staff, he made three unopened quarts of whiskey and a large box of cigars vanish. Zamloch later recalled that the editors were not amused, accused him of banditry, and he was nearly shot. The incident ended with the return of the whiskey and cigars, and the paper ran an account Zamloch's hoax. Zamloch kept a clipping from The Silver Reef Miner in his scrapbook. He once traveled with a sixteen-mule freight operation from Silver City, New Mexico, to Winnemucca, Nevada – a ten-day journey of “continual dust.”

When Zamloch appeared in Tombstone, Arizona, site of the Gunfight at the O.K. Corral, the local paper reported: “Professor Anton Zamloch returned to Tombstone, on November 19, fortified with more experience and the plaudits of other communities. . . . ’His spirit rapping, taking three cages and as many canaries from a hat of one of the audience, shooting doves out of an omelet, and hundreds of other amusing deceptions kept the audience in good humor."

== Tours of Mexico ==
He made tours of Mexico in 1905 and 1906. While traveling to Mexico, he was robbed by customs agents before being allowed to take his magical contraptions into Mexico. In Mexico City, he was accompanied by performing bullfighters, who were killed off one by one. Zamloch was surprised to learn that most Mexican theaters he appeared in did not have seats. Instead, it was customary for spectators to bring chairs from home or rent them from furniture stores.

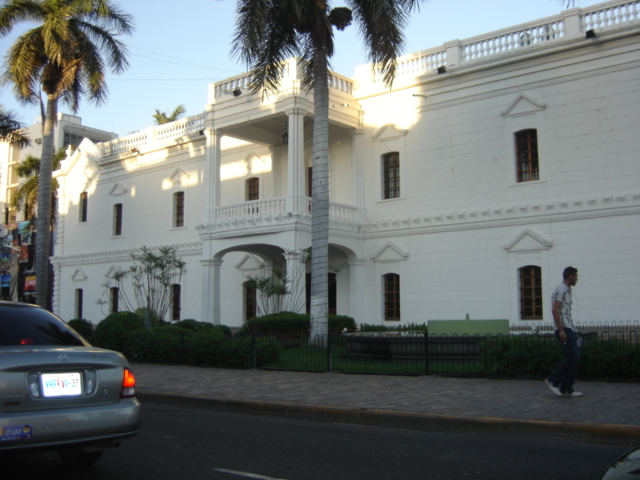
Culiacán Municipal Palace

Zamloch also learned that the most effective form of advertising in Mexico was to hold a street parade promoting the show. Musicians were hired, and local boys were paid to pass out programs along the parade route. During the parade, business would stop as the people of the town came to watch the parade. In Culiacán, the capital of Sinaloa, Zamloch's parade passed the palace, where the governor was sitting on his veranda. Zamloch stopped in front of the governor, bowed, and pulled from his top hat a green, white and red bird – the colors of the Mexican flag. The governor bowed back at Zamloch, who then waved a program which turned into a silk Mexican flag. The governor saluted, and Zamloch pulled from his hat cigarettes, combs, and five or six pounds of green, white and red candy, which he gave to the locals. Finally, he pulled a pint of champagne from the top-hat, which he shared with the governor.

== Tours of Hawaii ==
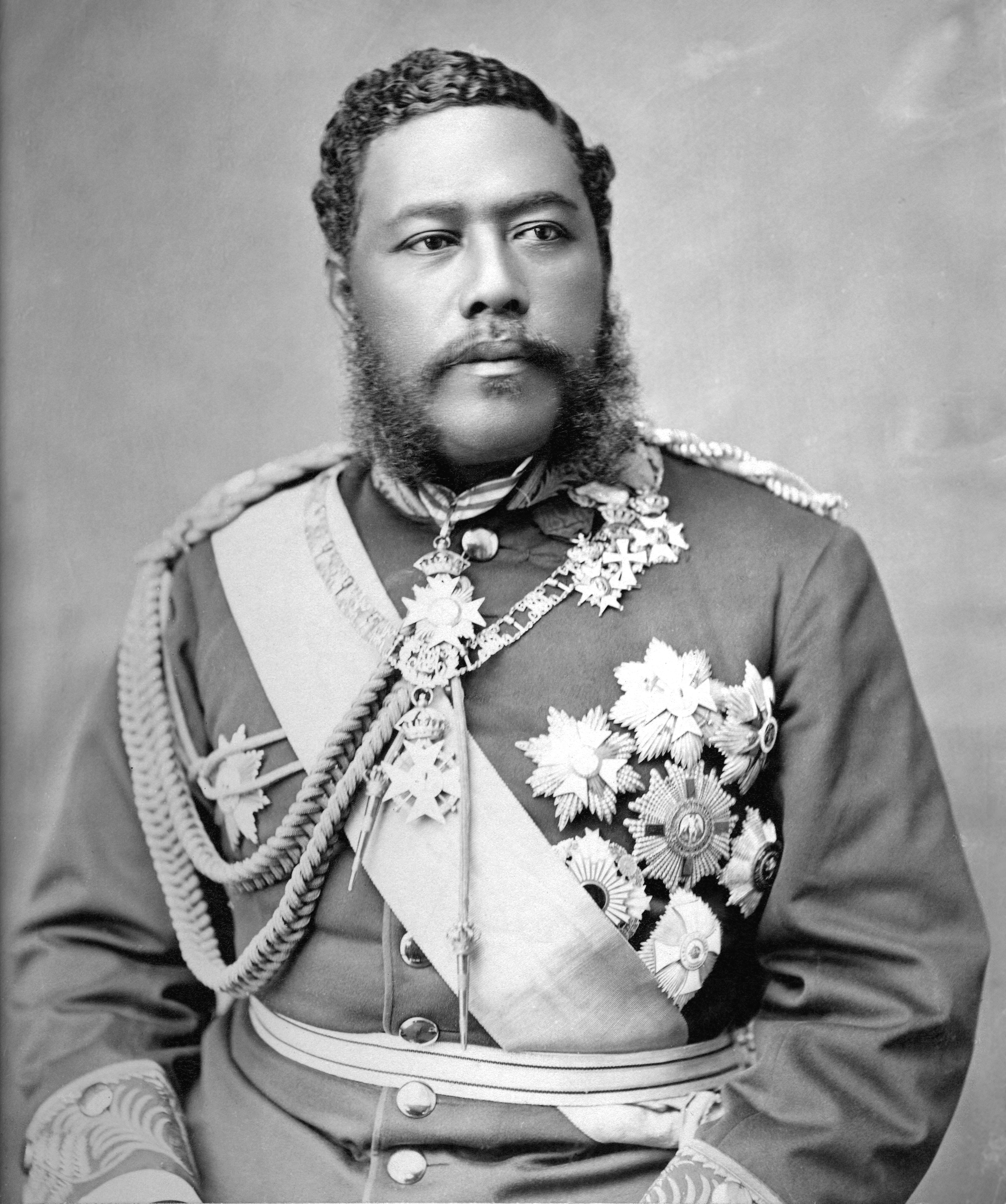
David Kalakaua

He made four tours of Hawaii in 1880, 1882, 1895, and 1904. Zamloch recalled that superstitious Hawaiians would lower their voices whenever they spoke of “Kahuna” (black arts). Zamloch said he was known in Hawaii as “Zamaloka Kahuna”. He met King David Kalakaua at Iolani Palace in January 1880 and kept an autographed letter from the king and an autographed invitation card from Queen Kapiolani to attend an afternoon luau on the palace grounds.

== The act ==
Zamloch's act changed over his 40-plus years as an entertainer and included communication with the deceased through spiritualism, sleight of hand tricks using Zamloch's skills of prestidigitation, illusions, card tricks, conjuring, vanishing tricks, burlesque, and humor.

=== The spirit-rapping table and goblin drum ===
One of Zamloch's trademark routines involved his spirit-rapping table and drum. An 1890 newspaper article described the trick this way: “The rapping table is placed in the main aisle in the auditorium and has a wooden dish which tilts against the top of the table and raps out answers to questions posed by the audience. The drum held in the hands of the magician raps answers also.”

In 1896, the Hawaiian Gazette described the routine this way: “The most mysterious of the twelve numbers on the program was the mystic bouquet, in which spirit rapping table and the goblin drum were introduced. On an ordinary table was placed a wooden disc higher in the center than on the edge – this was placed in the aisle within plain view of persons sitting near. Without any visible connections the disc rapped on the table at the call of the professor. Then a drum suspended from uprights was placed in the aisle, nearer the stage, and was made to beat roll call, marches and knock in answer to questions regarding cards selected by persons in the audience from a pack which the professor held in his hand.”

Zamloch later recalled that the Eastern cities were “daffy about spiritualism” in the 1880s and 1890s. After a tour of the East, vaudeville king Tony Pastor said, “No one has been able to solve the mystery of how a drum and table can be made to talk; yet they do – at command of Zamloch.”

In retirement, Zamloch kept the talking drum and table in his basement and proudly boasted that, “No performer ever has had my magic table and drum act. That is, nobody except the baby of our family, Carl Zamloch; he made them talk during the few months he was in vaudeville; he could be a clever magician, if he didn’t prefer baseball.” (Zamloch's son, Carl Zamloch, played baseball with Ty Cobb on the Detroit Tigers and was the head coach of the University of California's baseball team from 1916–1929.)

=== Making an omelet in a top-hat ===
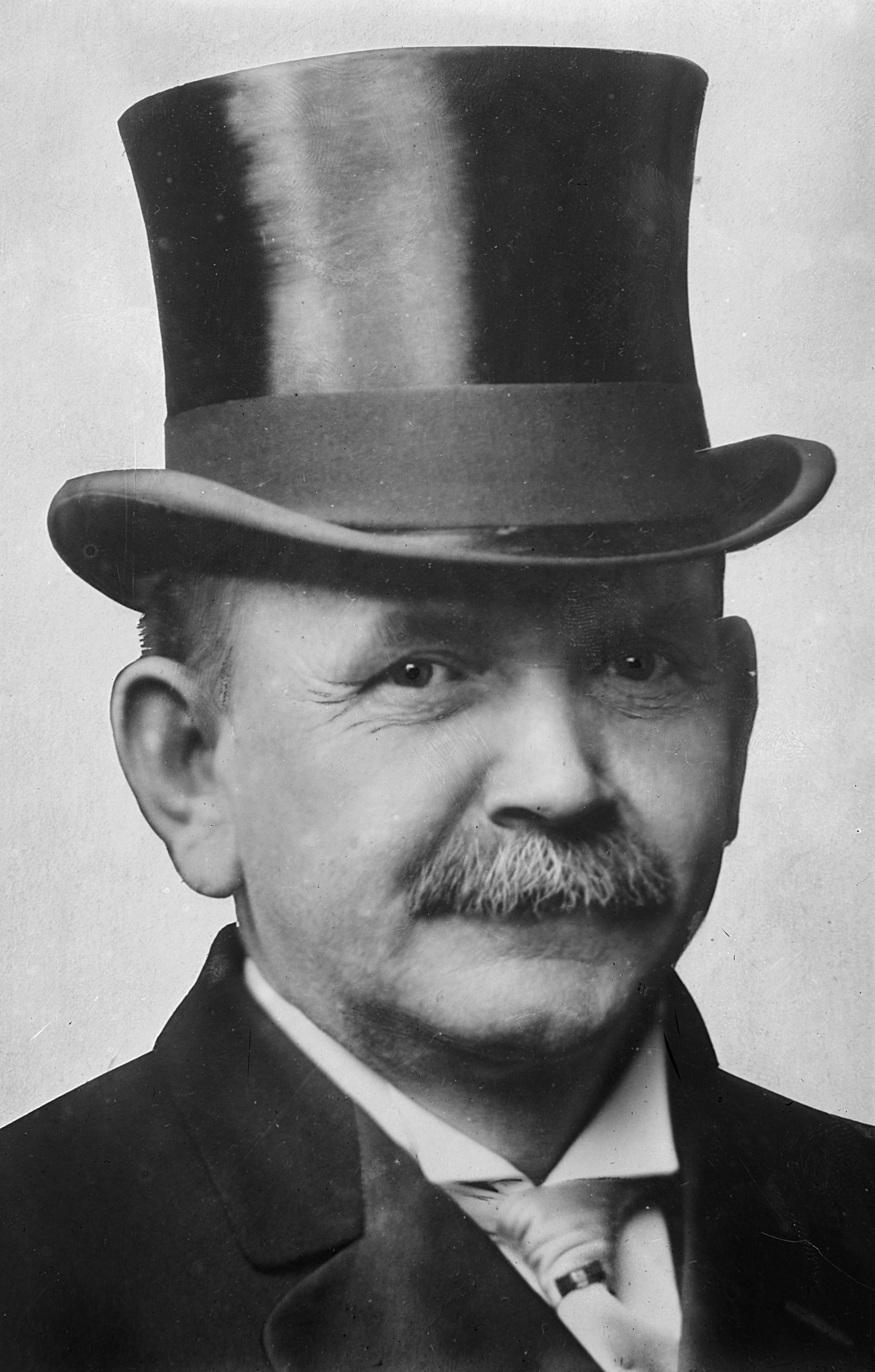
Typical top hat of the time

One of Zamloch's most popular conjuring tricks was to beat eggs in a top hat borrowed from a man in the audience. He would mix eggs and other ingredients in the hat and, when he was done, serve an omelet on a platter to a woman in the audience. He would then brush off the top hat and return it to the owner—undamaged.

=== The bumbling assistant reveals the illusion ===
In the 1880s, Zamloch met a young man named Charlie Irving, who sang parodies on the songs of the day. Zamloch hired him as his assistant to sing comic songs, dress as a stage clown, and burlesque some of Zamloch's lesser tricks. Zamloch had a running gag with Irving in which the assistant's “accidental” buffoonery would expose how one of Zamloch's tricks had been done. At times, Irving would do a comic version of the omelet in the hat trick in which he would take the hat from a confederate in the audience, wipe his egg-dripped hand on the outside of the top hat. Irving would then return the badly damaged hat to its “owner” and say, “Excuse me, but I have forgotten the rest of this trick.” Once in Canada, Irving used the hat of the local governor instead of the hat of a confederate. When Irving returned the governor's hat “filled with goo”, the audience “broke loose and some laughed until they lay down in the aisles”. Zamloch ran from the wings and offered to pay for the hat.

In 1881, the bumbling assistant routine resulted in articles published across the country, including Indiana, Iowa, Wisconsin, and Wyoming. The articles typically reported that Zamloch had hired an assistant named Higgins who revealed to Zamloch shortly before the curtain went up for a big show that he so near-sighted he could not see ten feet in front of him. The near-sighted assistant was positioned below a trap door in the stage, and when the signal came to make a boy disappear, the assistant inadvertently shoved a “two dollar ladder” up through the trap door knocking over Zamloch's props and exposing the illusion. Zamloch acted bedeviled, and the audience laughed at the mishap. The articles reported that Zamloch concluded his show with an illusion in which he rammed the near-sighted assistant into a double-barrel shotgun and shot him at a mark. The articles ended by noting that the assistant had not been seen since the show, “and the janitor who found a large wart on the stage, which he said he could identify, thinks that there has been foul play somewhere.”

=== The enchanted horse trough ===
Another popular Zamloch trick was the “Enchanted Horse Trough”. In this routine, buckets of water were poured into a trough on stage. Zamloch would then fish with rod and line and catch live and wet carp from the trough. His assistant would also fish from the trough and pull out, dripping wet, a rubber boot, a dead cat and finally a live devil, which was pushed back into the trough with much splashing. Then, Zamloch would tip over the trough and reveal it to be empty and dry. Zamloch later recalled that the enchanted trough was a big hit in Chicago, Omaha, and Kansas City.

=== Accusation of stealing a wedding ring ===
So powerful were Zamloch's skills that an audience member following a show in 1897 complained to the local police that Zamloch had bewitched her wedding ring from her gloved hand. Zamloch kept a letter he received from a California constable that said: “I take pleasure to write you that the lady, Mrs. Crossman, who claimed last night that you, by your magic and bewitching power, had stolen her wedding ring from her gloved hand during your last night’s performance, is feeling much better this morning. She says she found that you had reconsidered the matter and by your great spirit power had returned the ring to her. In other words, she found the darn ring in her trunk, which she had packed yesterday for a trip to Montana.”

=== The Indian basket trick ===
Zamloch also had a trick in which he would close himself in a large Indian basket on stage and then re-appear in the audience or at the back of the theater. In 1890, a Fresno, California, newspaper described the trick this way: “One of the most surprising things in the performance is the Indian basket trick. A large basket is placed on four chairs on the stage in full view of the spectators. Zamloch gets into the basket and the cover is shut down. In less than two minutes he was seen in the middle of the dress circle and the cover is taken off the basket, showing that it is empty.” In a variation on the basket trick, Zamloch shut himself up in an oversized champagne basket on center stage. He would stick his hand out of the basket and fire a pistol and then a moment later greeting the audience by saying, “Hello” from the main entrance.

=== Dancing skeletons ===
One of his most popular routines was the skeleton dance, in which he “could make two skeletons do a buck-and-wing dance (a form of tap-dancing used in 19th century minstrel shows) to ragtime music.” Another article reported favorably on “the graveyard scene of the dancing skeletons.” Spectators in Hawaii were “disappointed at the non-performance of the ‘dancing skeletons.’”

=== Severed nose ===
Zamloch also performed an illusion in which he perform rhinoplasty on stage. A Fresno newspaper described the routine as follows: “For one of his feats he called an urchin from the audience to the stage. The Professor found, he said, that the boy’s nose was too long and he would have to cut a portion of it off, which he, it appeared from the auditorium, had proceeded to do. It was very funny and realistic, and when he had finished the little chap felt to see if his nose was all there to the merriment of the spectators. ‘Just tell them at the doorkeeper tomorrow night that you are the boy whose nose was cut off last night and he will let you in free,’ remarked the Professor, as the little fellow left the stage.” In 1882, The Evening Telephone from Eureka, California, gave this account of the severed nose trick: “Zamloch cut off a boy’s nose last night. However, he put it on again – and not upside down. Congratulations, young fellow! Put it there! Your hand –not the nose.”

=== Disappearing jewels ===
Zamloch also had a routine in which he would use a large case of "jewels". He would ask a shy young man in the audience to hold the case for him, and "later, when the shy young man was requested to show the jewels to the spectators, there would be nothing in the case but one of those large whaleboned corsets in which girls of that period encased themselves." Zamloch recalled that the routine "always brought a great laugh, much to the shy young man’s discomfiture.”

=== Other tricks ===
Zamloch's other noted tricks included: make a bird cage containing two birds vanish; making and serving hot coffee from a little baskets of colored bits of paper; and breaking eggs into a frying pan and making a fire in it, and upon uncovering the pan having a pair of doves fly out.

=== Billy Marx ===
Zamloch also used a comic sidekick and assistant known as Billy Marx, who was the brother of Zamloch's wife. Zamloch's handbills described Marx as being slow and “never in a hurry”. In 1897, the Fresno Bee described Zamloch as “one of the wonders of the world” and noted of Billy: “Billy, the assistant, is one of those peculiar personages whose every wink and gesture, brings forth peals of laughter.” According to the Oakland Tribune, “Billy made wise-cracks and ‘had a way with him’ that audiences found amusing.” The Hawaiian Gazette described him as Zamloch’s “irrepressible assistant ‘Billy’ Marx.” On their appearance in Reno, Nevada, in 1896, the Nevada State Journal commented on Zamloch’s use of a “slow-going” assistant named “Billy”, who afforded “no little amusement to the audience”. The Ventura Democrat described him as the “constitutionally tired assistant”.

Apparently, though, Marx's humor was not for all tastes. In 1897, one writer noted: “Zamloch is assisted by ‘Billy’ Marx, ‘never in a hurry,’ as the program states, and that's no exaggeration. He is painfully slow at times and his humor is of an inferior kind. ‘Never in a hurry’ ought to be suppressed just a little.”

== Press coverage of Zamloch ==
Zamloch was also apparently an expert in dealing with the press. His arrival and performances received extensive press coverage in local newspapers in the cities where he performed. The following is a sampling of that coverage.

In 1880, The Daily Gazette in Colorado Springs noted: “Do not fail to visit Court House Hall tonight. Zamloch, the wizard will give you a present worth ten times your money, more or less, and will entertain you besides to a greater extend than the price of your ticket.”

On his return to Colorado Springs the following year, The Daily Gazette noted: “Zamloch is certainly a very clever prestidigitator and many of his tricks appear incapable of explanation. When he holds a wire cage containing a live canary and then advancing into the midst of the audience with an upward toss of his hand makes the cage and bird instantly disappear he performs one of the cleverest tricks known to the profession. The manner in which Zamloch manufactured piping hot coffee out of nothing and then provided cream from empty space was truly startling and was greeted with prolonged applause. To describe all the feats performed by him would take more than a column of space . . .” The review noted that Zamloch also distributed presents of real value “in strict accordance with the announcement.”

A California newspaper in 1883 gave Zamloch the following review: “Zamloch, the great presidigitateur and gift autocrat, concluded a series of four entertainments in the City Hall, Tuesday evening. The gentleman is a clever performer, and his entertainments were largely patronized and gave general satisfaction. The presents distributed were of a higher grade than those usually given by shows of this character. Zamloch is great.”

When Zamloch returned to Portland in 1883, the Morning Oregonian announced: “Tomorrow evening Zamloch, the Austrian conjuror, opens for a week at the New Market with his wonderful sleight of hand entertainment. Since his appearance here several years ago, Zamloch has made a tour of the world, adding largely to his stock of illusions.”

The San Luis Obispo Daily Register offered this colorful analysis in February 1888: “Blaze away, O Zamloch, with your __erried battery of mind-bewildering mystifications. We are converted and convorted. Come up. Imp-of-Darkness, and tie a red-ribbon to our hydrant and bid the ruby wine to flow forth. Then, indeed, poor printers will ever be thy proselytes. Step into our sanctum and coax dazzling editorials from the crown of our last election-won hat . . .”

In 1891, the San Antonio Daily Light noted: “Professor Zamloch, the Prestidigitateur, drew a large audience at Rische’s theater last night. Many of his feats of legerdemain are really wonderful and a good entertainment was given. The Professor has a great spiritualistic séance which is very clever and will be seen by the San Antonio public ere the departure of that gentleman.”

When he visited Phoenix, The Arizona Republican said: “Prof. Zamloch, the renowned conjuror, gave three exhibitions at Patton opera house during the past week. To say that the professor is the sleekest man in the world on the dark art business is putting it mildly.”

When Zamloch arrived in Hawaii in 1891 as part of a world tour, the Hawaiian Gazette reported: “Professor Anton Zamloch, magician, arrived in Honolulu on the Australia. He will be favorably remembered by many families and friends as giving his wonderful entertainments here about twelve years ago. He brings with him a vast amount of new and interesting features, and will undoubtedly receive a hearty welcome from our amusement-loving people. Himself and staff, among which is the irrepressible assistant ‘Billy’ Marx, will remain in Hawaii for about two weeks, and then proceed on their second great tour around the world.

The Hawaiian Gazette reported on his performances to large crowds, noting: “While admitting that everything he did was mere trickery, it was the object of each person in the hall to learn just how they were done. . . . Another interesting act was one in which flags of all nations, wine, ribbons, cigars and matches were taken out of the same bottle.”

Several nights later, the paper reported: “Zamloch reigned at the Opera House last night. The very air seemed to be permeated with mystery, and the spectators were at times almost breathless with expectancy at the wonderful results in magic, or in anticipation that he must surely fail in some great trick. But with Zamloch the word failure is not known, his feats in the mysterious arts are carried out so neatly and seemingly so easily, that the audience is mystified and simply stare in speechless wonder. His basket trick, the changing of the canary birds from a glass case one side of the stage to a cage on the other side, by simply tapping his wand and right in full view of the audience, cannot be explained. His cabinet séance is as much a mystery as the many other things he does, and still he says it is not spiritualism, rheumatism or any other ‘ism, but explains to the wondering audiences that it is just the way he does it, and they don’t ‘catch on.’”

On November 12, 1897, the Ventura Democrat reported: “A crowded house greeted Zamloch last evening at Armory Hall, and the entertainment furnished by this greatest of conjurers and his constitutionally tired assistant, ‘Billy,’ was excellent throughout. Zamloch, in his most marvelous mystifications, is the most successful operator of his class today, barring none – being the equal of the famous Herman, who has caused wonder among the people of all countries and kingdoms. Zamloch is easy, graceful, courteous and humorous – his every deception practiced with complete success.”

In December 1897, the Fresno Bee reported: “Wherever Prof. Zamloch has appeared his performances have been highly praised by the press and public. His show is clean and is first class in every detail. Nothing to shock the most fastidious, at the same time keeping the audience in roars of laughter from rise to fall of the curtain.”

== Retirement in Oakland ==
Zamloch retired to his home in Oakland, California, where he took up bee-keeping, keeping 50 hives, as his hobby. He was married for 50 years to his wife, whom he married in approximately 1880. In earlier years, Mrs. Zamloch would tour with her husband, and she was the beautiful woman whom he would float through the air.

The Zamlochs had three sons, Claude, Archer and Carl. Carl Zamloch pitched for the Detroit Tigers and played with Ty Cobb.
