= Howard Murphy (baseball) =

American baseball player (1882–1926)

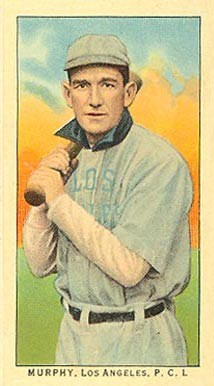
- Outfielder
- Born: January 1, 1882; Birmingham, Alabama, U.S.
- Died: October 5, 1926 (aged 44); Fort Worth, Texas, U.S.
- Batted: Left Threw: Right

MLB debut
- August 4, 1909, for the St. Louis Cardinals

Last MLB appearance
- October 6, 1909, for the St. Louis Cardinals

MLB statistics
- Batting average: .200
- Home runs: 0
- Runs batted in: 3
- Stats at Baseball Reference

Teams
- St. Louis Cardinals (1909)

Howard Murphy (January 1, 1882 – October 5, 1926) was an American Major League Baseball outfielder. He played in 25 games for the St. Louis Cardinals in 1909. His minor league baseball career spanned sixteen seasons, from 1901 until 1916. After his playing career, Murphy served as head baseball coach at Decatur Baptist College.
