= Con Strouthers =

American baseball manager

Cornelius "Con" Strouthers was a baseball manager in the late 19th century and early 20th century. From 1895 to 1896, he was the third manager of the Detroit Tigers during their time in the Western League before they became a major league team in 1901. In 1904 he was the manager of the Augusta Tourists of the South Atlantic League or "Sally League" when he invited Ty Cobb, who would go on to a Hall of Fame career with the Tigers, to join the club.

Overall, after his playing career ended, Strouthers served as a minor league manager in 13-seasons with 13 different teams between 1892 and 1909.
