= Boise Pilots =

Coordinates: 43.602°N 116.186°W

- (1939–42, 1946–51, 1954); Boise, Idaho

Minor league affiliations
- Previous classes: Class C
- Previous leagues: Pioneer League

Team data
- Previous parks: Airway Park (1939–42, 1946–51); Joe Devine Airway Park (1954)

The Boise Pilots were a minor league baseball team in the western United States, based in Boise, Idaho. They played in the Pioneer League for a total of 11 seasons between 1939 and 1954. They were unaffiliated with any major league team, and played at the Class C level. Their home venue was originally named Airway Park in 1939, and in 1952 was renamed Joe Devine Airway Park.

== History ==
Minor league baseball began in Boise in 1904 when the Boise Fruit Pickers played as members of the Pacific National League. In 1905, the Boise Infants continued play in the Pacific National League. Boise fielded two teams in 1909, as Boise played as members of the Montana State League, and the Boise Irrigators were members of the Inter-Mountain League. The Boise Irrigators later played in the Union Association (1911, 1914) and Western Tri-State League (1912–1913).

The Boise Pilots immediately followed the Boise Senators of the 1928 Utah-Idaho League and were one of the six original teams of the Pioneer League when it was formed in 1939. The team competed through the 1951 season, except for three years during World War II when the league did not operate. Boise's team then became the Yankees, who were affiliated with New York during 1952 and 1953. That affiliation did not continue, and the team operated independently again as the Pilots in 1954. Boise's team then became a Milwaukee affiliate from 1955 through 1963, operating as the Braves. After the Braves' final season of 1963, the ballpark was demolished, and Boise was without a minor league team until the Boise A's of the Northwest League debuted in 1975.

== Season records ==
Season	Manager(s)	W–L	Win %	Finish	Playoffs	Ref
1939	Andy Harrington	62–62	.500	3rd	no playoffs held	
1940	Andy Harrington	66–63	.512	3rd	lost in finals	
1941	Jim Keesey	81–49	.623	1st	lost in finals	
1942	Jim Keesey	68–51	.571	2nd	lost in finals	
1943–45	league paused due to World War II					
1946	Walter Lowe	52–77	.403	6th	none	
1947	Walter Lowe	67–70	.489	4th	none	
1948	Walter Lowe	58–68	.460	6th	none	
1949	William Stenger; Gordon Williamson	47–77	.379	7th	none	
1950	Ford "Moon" Mullen	50–74	.403	7th	none	
1951	Thomas Lloyd; Frank Gregory	51–88	.367	8th	none	
1952–53	team operated as the Boise Yankees					
1954	Ed Fernandes	47–84	.359	8th	none	

== All-stars ==
Season	Name & Position
1940	Walter Lowe, 1B; Joe Egnatz, OF; Elden Lorenzen, Util.
1941	Jack Radtke, 2B; Joe Egnatz, OF; Clifford Barker, C Gerry Staley, P
1947	Walter Lowe, 1B; Lou Tamone, 3B
1948	William Franks, P
1954	William Francis, P

== Notable players ==
- Lee Maye
- Ford "Moon" Mullen
- Marv Rickert
- Floyd Robinson
- Gerry Staley

== See also ==
- Boise Pilots players
