= Pat Bohen =

American baseball player (1890–1942)

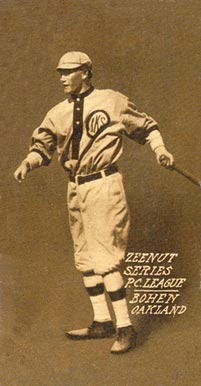
- Pitcher
- Born: September 30, 1890; Oakland, Iowa, U.S.
- Died: April 8, 1942 (aged 51); Napa, California, U.S.
- Batted: Right Threw: Right

MLB debut
- October 1, 1913, for the Philadelphia Athletics

Last MLB appearance
- September 6, 1914, for the Pittsburgh Pirates

MLB statistics
- Win–loss record: 0-1
- Earned run average: 3.00
- Strikeouts: 5
- Stats at Baseball Reference

Teams
- Philadelphia Athletics (1913); Pittsburgh Pirates (1914)

Leo Ignatius Bohen (September 30, 1890 – April 8, 1942) was an American Major League Baseball pitcher. He started one game for the Philadelphia Athletics during the 1913 season and made one relief appearance for the Pittsburgh Pirates during the 1914 season.
