= Nig Perrine =

American baseball player (1885-1948)

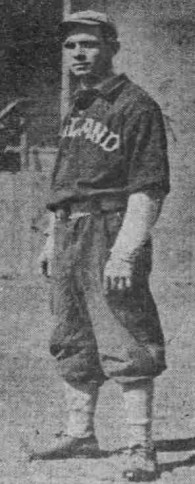
- Infielder
- Born: January 14, 1885; Clinton, Wisconsin, U.S.
- Died: August 13, 1948 (aged 63); Kansas City, Missouri, U.S.
- Batted: Right Threw: Right

MLB debut
- April 11, 1907, for the Washington Senators

Last MLB appearance
- July 9, 1907, for the Washington Senators

MLB statistics
- Batting average: .171
- Home runs: 0
- Runs batted in: 15
- Stats at Baseball Reference

Teams
- Washington Senators (1907)

John Grover "Nig" Perrine (January 14, 1885 – August 13, 1948) was an American professional baseball infielder.

Perrine started his professional baseball career in 1902, at the age of 17. In 1906, he batted .308 in the American Association (AA) and was purchased by the Washington Senators of the American League. However, Perrine was sent back down to the AA after batting .171 in 44 games. He played in the minor leagues until 1915. Perrine was one of several baseball players in the first half of the 20th century to be nicknamed "Nig".
