= Rex Dawson =

American baseball player (1889-1958)

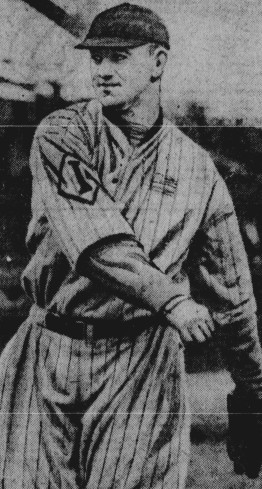
- Pitcher
- Born: February 10, 1889; Skagit County, Washington
- Died: October 20, 1958 (aged 69); Indianapolis, Indiana, U.S.
- Batted: Left Threw: Right

MLB debut
- October 3, 1913, for the Washington Senators

Last MLB appearance
- October 3, 1913, for the Washington Senators

MLB statistics
- Win–loss record: 0–0
- Earned run average: 0.00
- Strikeouts: 1
- Stats at Baseball Reference

Teams
- Washington Senators (1913)

Rexford Paul Dawson (born February 10, 1888 – October 20, 1958) was a Major League Baseball pitcher for the Washington Senators. He played his only major league game on October 3, 1913. He was born in Mount Vernon, Washington, and grew up in North Vancouver, British Columbia.

His brother Joe also played in the Majors.
