= Cliff Blankenship =

American baseball player (1880–1956)

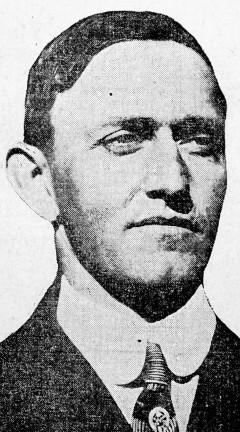
- Catcher / First baseman
- Born: April 10, 1880; Columbus, Georgia, U.S.
- Died: April 26, 1956 (aged 76); Oakland, California, U.S.
- Batted: Right Threw: Right

MLB debut
- April 17, 1905, for the Cincinnati Reds

Last MLB appearance
- August 18, 1909, for the Washington Senators

MLB statistics
- Fielding percentage: .952
- Putouts: 344
- Batting average: .225
- Stats at Baseball Reference

Teams
- Cincinnati Reds (1905); Washington Senators (1907, 1909)

Clifford Douglas Blankenship (April 10, 1880 – April 26, 1956) was an American professional baseball player. He played his first game on April 17, 1905 for the Cincinnati Reds. He played his 95th and final game on August 18, 1909 for the Washington Senators. He continued playing in the minor leagues until 1916. He also managed in the minors from 1910 to 1922.

In 1907, Senators manager Joe Cantillon sent Blankenship, who was injured with a broken finger, to Weiser, Idaho to scout pitcher Walter Johnson. Blankenship successfully persuaded Johnson to accept a Washington contract.
