= Great Falls Electrics =

- 1911–1963; (1911–1913, 1916–1917, 1948–1963); Great Falls, Montana

Minor league affiliations
- Class: Class A (1963); Class C (1948–1962); Class B (1892, 1916–1917); Class D (1911–1913); Independent (1900, 1905)
- League: Pioneer League (1948–1963); Northwestern League (1916–1917); Union Association (1911–1913); Montana State League (1892, 1900, 1905)

Major league affiliations
- Team: Brooklyn/Los Angeles Dodgers (1952–1963)

Minor league titles
- League titles (5): 1913; 1917; 1951; 1954; 1961

Team data
- Name: Great Falls Electrics (1951–1963); Great Falls Selectrics (1949–1950); Great Falls Electrics (1911–1913, 1916–1917, 1948); Great Falls Indians (1900, 1905); Great Falls Smelter Cities (1892)
- Ballpark: Centene Stadium

The Great Falls Electrics were a minor league baseball team that operated out of Great Falls, Montana. The team was formed in 1911 as part of the old Union Association league. They also played in the Northwestern League from 1916 to 1917. The team disbanded at that time and then was reformed as part of the Pioneer League in 1948. They became an affiliate of the Brooklyn Dodgers in 1952 and remained with the Dodgers through 1963. The team was briefly called the Great Falls Dodgers during the 1957 season and the Great Falls Selectrics in 1949–1950.

In 1969, the team now known as the Great Falls Voyagers began play as the Great Falls Giants and they have remained active under different names since.

== The ballpark ==
The Electrics played at Centene Stadium then called Legion Park, located at 1015 25th Street North Great Falls, Montana. The park is still in use today, as home of the Great Falls Voyagers of the Pioneer League.

== Electrics name change ==
On February 24, 1949, the advisory board of directors of the Great Falls Baseball Club agreed to change the name of the team to the Selectrics. Great Falls Breweries, Inc., the owner of the club, originally had hoped to rename the team the "Selects" to advertise its beer, but the Pioneer League rejected the proposed name change because it advertised a commercial product. The Pioneer League approved the name "Selectrics," however, which was a portmanteau of the Great Falls Breweries "Select" beer and the previous team name, "Electrics."

== Notable alumni ==
=== Hall of Fame alumni ===
- Bobby Cox (1963) Inducted, 2014
- Joe Tinker (1900) Inducted, 1946

=== Notable alumni ===
- Tony Boeckel (1916-1917)
- Joe Bowman (1949-1950)
- Bennie Daniels (1951)
- John Roseboro (1953) 6 x MLB All-Star
- Larry Sherry (1954) 1959 World Series Most Valuable Player

== Year-by-year record ==
Year	League	Affiliation	Record	Finish	Manager	Playoffs/Notes
1911	Union Association	none	90-46	1st	George Reed	League Champs
1912	Union Association	none	72-61	3rd	George Reed	none held
1913	Union Association	none	78-42	1st	Harry Hester	League Champs
1916	Northwestern League	none	60-61	4th	Dick Hurley / Herb Hester	none held
1917	Northwestern League	none	42-29	1st	Herb Hester	League Champs
1948	Pioneer League	none	51-75	7th	Rich Gyselman	None
1949	Pioneer League	none	62-62	5th	Joe Bowman	None
1950	Pioneer League	none	68-57	4th	Joe Bowman / John Angelone	Lost first round
1951	Pioneer League	none	76-60	3rd	Buck Elliott	League Champs
1952	Pioneer League	Brooklyn Dodgers	67-64	4th	Lou Rochelli	Lost first round
1953	Pioneer League	Brooklyn Dodgers	77-54	2nd	Lou Rochelli	Lost League Finals
1954	Pioneer League	Brooklyn Dodgers	70-62	4th	Lou Rochelli	League Champs
1955	Pioneer League	Brooklyn Dodgers	74-58	2nd	Lou Rochelli	Lost first round
1956	Pioneer League	Brooklyn Dodgers	64-68	6th	Lou Rochelli	None
1957	Pioneer League	Los Angeles Dodgers	48-77	8th	Jack Banta	None
1958	Pioneer League	Los Angeles Dodgers	63-70	5th	Stan Wasiak	Lost playoffs
1959	Pioneer League	Los Angeles Dodgers	60-70	4th	Brandy Davis	Lost first round
1960	Pioneer League	Los Angeles Dodgers	55-75	5th	Spider Jorgensen	None
1961	Pioneer League	Los Angeles Dodgers	75-58	2nd	Al Ronning	League Champs
1962	Pioneer League	Los Angeles Dodgers	60-70	5th	Al Ronning	None
1963	Pioneer League	Los Angeles Dodgers	69-59	3rd	Al Ronning	Lost first round
