= Butte Miners =

- 1892–1925; (1892, 1900, 1902–1909, 1911–1914, 1916–1917, 1925); Butte, Montana

Minor league affiliations
- Class: Class B (1892); Independent (1900); Class B (1902); Class A (1903); Class B (1904); Independent (1905); Class B (1906–1908); Independent (1909); Class D (1909, 1911–1914); Class B (1916–1917); Independent (1925)
- League: Montana State League (1892, 1900); Pacific Northwest League (1902); Pacific National League (1903–1904); Montana State League (1905); Northwestern League (1906–1908); Montana State League (1909); Inter-Mountain League (1909); Union Association (1911–1914); Northwestern League (1916–1917); Montana State League (1925)

Major league affiliations
- Team: None

Minor league titles
- League titles (3): 1892; 1902; 1903

Team data
- Name: Butte (1892, 1909, 1925); Butte Smoke Eaters (1900); Butte Miners (1902–1909, 1911–1914, 1916–1917)
- Ballpark: Mt. Columbia Grounds (1900, 1902–1909, 1911–1914, 1916–1917)

The Butte Miners were a minor league baseball franchise based in Butte, Montana. Butte minor league teams played as members of the Montana State League (1892, 1900), Pacific Northwest League (1902), Pacific National League (1903–1904), Montana State League (1905), Northwestern League (1906–1908), Inter-Mountain League (1909), Montana State League (1909), Union Association (1911–1914), Northwestern League (1916–1917) and Montana State League (1925). Butte hosted home minor league games at the Mt. Columbia Grounds.

Baseball Hall of Fame member Joe McGinnity was a player/manager of the Butte Miners in 1916 and 1917.

== History ==
=== Montana State League 1892, 1900 ===
Minor league baseball began in Butte, Montana in 1892. The Butte team played as members of the newly formed Class B level Montana State League. The Bozeman, Great Falls Smelter Cities, Helena, Missoula and Philipsburg Burgers teams joined Butte in league play.

Playing as charter members in the Montana State League, Butte finished as the 1892 Montana State League Champions. The league played a split–season schedule, with Butte capturing the first–half title and Missoula winning the second–half title, while Helena had the best overall record, but missed the playoff. Butte finished with a 26–22 overall record, playing under manager Jim Powell. Powell had moved to Butte to work as manager of Maguire's Opera House after his major league career. As Butte won the first–half championship and Missoula won the second–half title, Butte was awarded the overall championship after Helena reportedly forfeited the playoff series over complaints regarding money and umpiring. The Montana State League folded after the 1892 season.

The Montana State League reformed in 1900 under the direction of president William Henry Lucas. The Butte Smoke Eaters were a member of the four–team league, along with the Anaconda Serpents, Great Falls Indians and Helena Senators. The 1900 Bute Smoke Eaters ended the season with a 30–40 record, placing fourth and last in the Montana State League. The Butte Smoke Eaters were again managed by Jim Powell. The Montana State League did not return to play in 1901.

=== Pacific Northwest/National League 1902–1904 / Montana State League 1905 ===
The Butte Miners became members of the Class B level Pacific Northwest League in 1902 and won the first of back–to–back championships.

In 1902, Butte finished 1st with a 73–47 record, playing under manager John McCloskey. The Pacific Northwest League had no playoffs and Butte won the championship based on the final league standings. The Butte Miners finished 3.0 games ahead of the second place Seattle Clamdiggers in the six–team league. Seattle (70–50) was followed by the Helena Senators (65–54), Portland Webfoots (58–62), Tacoma Tigers (48–72) and Spokane Smoke Eaters (46–75) in the final standings.

The Butte Miners won a second consecutive league championship in 1903. The Butte franchise continued play as the Pacific Northwest League became a Class A level league and was renamed the Pacific National League, expanding to eight teams. In the era, Class A was the highest level of minor league baseball. Playing under managers Jerry Kane and Walt Wilmot, Butte ended the season with a 85–62 record, finishing 4.5 games ahead of the second place Spokane Indians (82–68) as only four teams finished the season. They were followed by the Seattle Chinooks (78–71) and Portland Green Gages/Salt Lake City Elders (56–91). The Helena Senators (40–62) and Tacoma Tigers (46–60) both disbanded on August 16, 1903. The Los Angeles Angels (65–42) and San Francisco Pirates (56–52) disbanded August 21, 1903.

The 1904 Pacific National League continued play as a four–team Class B level league and Butte finished in third place. The Butte Miners ended the season with a 54–75 record under manager Walt Wilmot, finishing the season 27.0 games behind the champion Boise Fruit Pickers. The 1904 Butte team was also called the Butte Fruit Pickers by some references.

Butte played in the 1905 four–team Montana State League, which operated as an Independent level league. Great Falls, Helena and Missoula were the other members. No 1905 Montana State League standings are known.

=== Northwestern League 1906–1908 ===
In 1906, the Butte Miners became members of the Class B level Northwestern League, where they would continue play for the next four seasons. The Butte Miners finished with a 43–42 record, placing second under manager Charles McIntyre. Butte finished 8.5 games behind the first place Tacoma Tigers, no playoffs were held. On July 29, 1906, Butte Miners pitcher Oscar Bandelin threw a no-hitter in a 15–0 victory over the Spokane Indians.

The Butte Miners finished in fourth place in the 1907 Northwestern League. The Miners ended the season with a 70–73 record under manager Russ Hall. Butte finished 18.5 games behind the 1st place Aberdeen Black Cats in six–team league final standings.

The 1908 Butte Miners played their final Northwestern League season. Butte finished with a 63–73 record, playing again under Russ Hall. The Miners were in fifth place, 16.5 games behind the first place Vancouver Beavers.

=== 1909 Inter-Mountain League, Montana State League / Union Association 1911–1914 ===
In 1909, the Butte Miners played in two leagues. Butte first began the season becoming charter members of the Class D four–team Inter-Mountain League. On July 25, 1909, the Miners were in third place with a 21–36 record when the Inter-Mountain League disbanded. The Butte manager in 1909 was John Barnes. After the league folded, Butte switched leagues and played as members of the Montana State League for the remainder of the 1909 season. Finishing 20–31 in the Montana State League, Butte joined franchises from Boise, Idaho, Helena and Salt Lake, Utah in the 1909 Montana State League portion of the season.

The six–team Union Association was formed in 1911, with William Henry Lucas again leading a new league. The Butte Miners were charter members of the Class D league. The 1911 Butte Miners ended the season in third place with a 77–60 record under manager John McCloskey, finishing 13.5 games behind the first place Great Falls team.

In 1912, the Butte Miners placed 5th in the six–team Union Association. The Miners had a 53–82 record under managers Charles McCaffery and Jesse Stovall, finishing 30.5 games behind first place Missoula. On July 23, 1912, Butte pitcher Wheezer Dell threw a no-hitter in a 1–0 Miners victory over the Ogden Canners.

The Butte Miners placed third in the 1913 Union Association standings. Butte finished with a 54–64 record under managers Arthur Merkle and Frank Kafora, ending 23.0 games behind the champion Great Falls Electrics.

The 1914 Union Association permanently folded on August 5, 1914. Butte was in third place with a 44–40 record under manager Ducky Holmes when the league disbanded. The top two teams in the Union Association standings, the Ogden Canners and Salt Lake City Skyscrapers played out their 1914 seasons, with 16 games against each other. Butte had been 7.0 games behind Salt Lake City for 2nd place when the league folded.

=== Northwestern League 1916–1917 ===
The 1916 Butte Miners returned to minor league play as members of the Class B level Northwestern League. Baseball Hall of Fame member Joe McGinnity was the player/manager for the 1917 Butte Miners. Butte finished with a 68–59 record, placing second in the league, 11.0 games behind the champion Spokane Indians. McGinnity had a 20–13 record, while pitching 291 innings for Butte at age 45.

In 1917, Joe McGinnity again managed the Butte Miners, but did not pitch. The 1917 Miners had a final record of 31–38. Butte placed fifth in the Northwestern League final standings playing under managers, Hall of Famer McGinnity and Cliff McCarl. The Miners finished 10.0 games behind the first place Great Falls Electrics in the final standings, as the 1917 league season was shortened to July 15, 1917, with National Association approval.

=== Final Seasons ===
Butte played the 1925 season in the Independent level Montana State League. No standings or statistics are available for the 1925 league.

Butte was without minor league baseball until the 1978 Butte Copper Kings began play ias members of the Pioneer League. Butte hosted a franchise in the Pioneer League from 1978 to 1985 and again from 1987 to 2000.

== The ballpark ==
Beginning in 1900, Butte minor league teams played at the Mt. Columbia Grounds. The ballpark was located on site of the Columbia Gardens (amusement park) in Butte. The Butte Electric Railway Company provided rail service to Columbia Gardens. Built in 1899, the Columbia Gardens were dismantled in 1973.

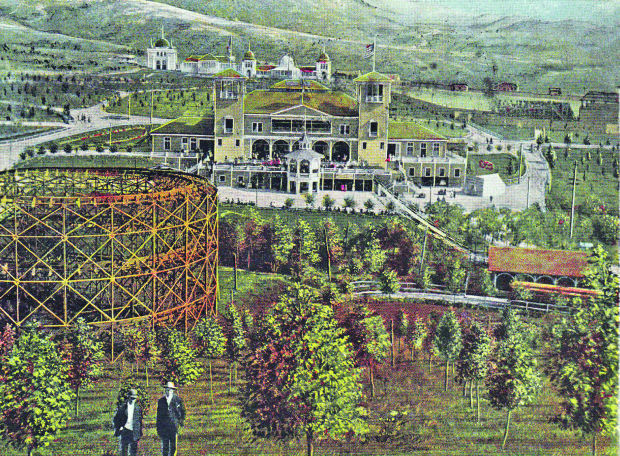
Columbia Gardens, Butte, Montana 1905

== Timeline ==
Year(s)	# Yrs.	Team	Level	League	Ballpark
1892	1	Butte	Class B	Montana State League	Unknown
1900	1	Butte Smoke Eaters	Independent	Montana State League	Mt. Columbia Grounds
1902	1	Butte Miners	Class B	Pacific Northwest League	Mt. Columbia Grounds
1903	1	Butte Miners	Class A	Pacific National League	Mt. Columbia Grounds
1904	1	Butte Miners	Class B	Pacific National League	Mt. Columbia Grounds
1905	1	Butte Miners	Independent	Montana State League	Mt. Columbia Grounds
1906–1908	3	Butte Miners	Class B	Northwestern League	Mt. Columbia Grounds
1909(1)	1	Butte Miners	Class D	Inter-Mountain League	Mt. Columbia Grounds
1909(2)	1	Butte Miners	Independent	Montana State League	Mt. Columbia Grounds
1911–1914	4	Butte Miners	Class D	Union Association	Mt. Columbia Grounds
1916–1917	2	Butte Miners	Class B	Northwestern League	Mt. Columbia Grounds
1925	1	Butte	Independent	Montana State League	Mt. Columbia Grounds

== Notable alumni ==
- Joe McGinnity (1916–1917, MGR) Inducted Baseball Hall of Fame, 1947
- John Barnes (1909, MGR)
- Moose Baxter (1906)
- Ben Beville (1900)
- Rudy Bell (1907)
- Jack Brennan (1892)
- Ed Bruyette (1907)
- Eddie Burke (1900)
- Dad Clarke (1900, 1904)
- George Crable (1906)
- Jim Cook (1904)
- Ira Davis
- Wheezer Dell (1905, 1909, 1912)
- George Dickerson (1917)
- Pete Dowling (1902–1903, 1904)
- Carl Druhot (1911–1912)
- Tom Fitzsimmons (1916)
- Ned Garvin (1907)
- Roy Grover (1916)
- John Halla (1914)
- Truck Hannah (1911)
- Spec Harkness (1908)
- Jerry Harrington (1892)
- Eddie Hickey (1908)
- Jesse Hoffmeister (1904)
- Ducky Holmes (1914, MGR)
- Lefty Houtz (1902)
- Ben Hunt (1917)
- Jake Kafora (1912–1913, 1917)
- Rudy Kallio (1913)
- Al Kellogg (1913)
- Jack Killilay (1907)
- Ed Kippert (1916)
- Ralph Kreitz (1908)
- Dan Lally (1904)
- Elmer Leifer (1917)
- Harry Lochhead (1900)
- Con Lucid (1892)
- Jack Lundbom (1903)
- Mike Lynch (1903)
- Lefty Marr (1892)
- Joe Marshall (1902, 1911–1913)
- Joe Mathes (1911–1912)
- John McCloskey (1902, 1911, MGR)
- Ed McCreery (1913–1914)
- Jim McHale (1902, 1904)
- Steve Melter (1914)
- Chief Meyers (1907)
- Dan Minnehan (1892)
- Tony Mullane (1892) Cincinnati Reds Hall of Fame
- John Munyan (1892)
- Nig Perrine (1911)
- Jim Powell (1892, 1900 MGR)
- Eddie Quick (1904)
- Alex Remneas (1911)
- Skel Roach (1902–1903)
- Solly Salisbury (1902)
- Owen Shannon (1912–1913)
- Jim St. Vrain (1900)
- Jud Smith (1892)
- Charley Stis (1907–1908)
- Jesse Stovall (1912, MGR)
- Charlie Swindells (1903–1904, 1906)
- Jake Thielman (1900)
- Bill Tozer (1903)
- George Treadway (1902)
- Cal Vasbinder (1904)
- Piggy Ward (1902–1903)
- Farmer Weaver (1902)
- Joe Werrick (1892)
- Walt Wilmot (1903,–1904 MGR)
- Les Wilson (1916)
- Bill White (1892)
- Bill Wilson (1892)
- Dave Zearfoss (1902)

== See also ==
- Butte Fruit Pickers players
- Butte Miners players
- Butte (minor league baseball) players
- Butte Smoke Eaters players
