= Helena Senators =

Baseball team

- 1892–1914; (1892, 1900, 1902–1903, 1905, 1909, 1911–1914); Helena, Montana

Minor league affiliations
- Class: Class B (1892); Independent (1900); Class B (1902); Class A (1903); Independent (1905); Class D (1909, 1911–1914)
- League: Montana State League (1892, 1900); Pacific Northwest League (1902); Pacific National League (1903); Montana State League (1905); Inter-Mountain League (1909); Union Association (1911–1914)

Major league affiliations
- Team: None

Minor league titles
- League titles (2): 1892; 1909

Team data
- Name: Helena (1892); Helena Senators (1900, 1902–1903, 1909, 1911–1914)
- Ballpark: Unknown

The Helena Senators were a minor league baseball team based in Helena, Montana. Between 1892 and 1914, Helena minor league teams played as members of the Montana State League (1892, 1900), 1902 Pacific Northwest League, 1903 Pacific National League, 1904 Montana State League, 1909 Inter-Mountain League and Union Association (1911–1914). Helena won league championships in 1892 and 1909.

Baseball Hall of Fame member Joe Tinker played for the 1900 Helena Senators.

== History ==
Minor league baseball began in Helena, Montana in 1892, when the Helena team played as members of the Montana State League. Playing as charter members in the Independent league, Helena finished as the 1892 Montana State League Champions. The team had a 29–21 record under manager Con Strothers to capture the league championship, finishing 2.5 games ahead of the 2nd place Butte Miners in the six–team league. The Montana State League folded after the 1892 season.

The Montana State League reformed in 1900, with the Helena "Senators" as a member. The 1900 Helena Senators had a record of 39–33, placing second in the Montana State League, finishing 1.0 game behind the champion Great Falls Indians. The Helena managers were Carl Wood, Patrick "Paddy" Ryan and Jack Flannery.

Baseball Hall of Fame member Joe Tinker played for the 1900 Helena Senators at age 19. Tinker is part of the famed Tinker to Evers to Chance trio with the Chicago Cubs. Playing in his first professional season, Tinker came to Helena after being purchased from fellow Montana State League member Great Falls Indians for $200.00. Tinker hit .322 for the season, making $90.00 a month.

The Montana State League permanently folded after the 1900 season.

The Helena Senators became members of the Class B level Pacific Northwest League in 1902. The Pacific Northwest League's president was William Henry Lucas, who had previously been president of the Montana State League. The 1902 Helena Senators ended the season with a record of 65–54, placing 3rd in the six–team Pacific Northwest League, playing under manager Jack Flannery. Finishing 7.5 games behind the first place Butte Miners, Helena drew a season home attendance of 25,000, an average of 420 per game.

In 1903, the Helena Senators folded before the end of the season. Helena had continued play as the Pacific Northwest League became a Class A league, was renamed the Pacific National League and expanded to eight teams. Helena placed eighth in 1903 behind the Butte Miners (85–62), Los Angeles Angels (65–42) Portland Green Gages/Salt Lake City Elders (56–91), San Francisco Pirates (56–52), Seattle Chinooks (78–71), Spokane Indians (82–68) and Tacoma Tigers (46–60). Helena had a 40–62 record when the team was disbanded on August 16, 1903, along with Tacoma.

Helena played again in the 1905 Montana State League, which operated as an Independent league that season. No official records of the 1905 Montana League season are known.

After a 3–year hiatus, the 1909 Helena Senators again began play, as the Senators became member of the Class D level Inter-Mountain League, under league president William Henry Lucas. The Helena Senators won the 1909 Inter-Mountain League Championship in a shortened season. On July 25, 1903, Helena was in 1st place with a 43–19 record when the four–team Inter–Mountain League disbanded. The Helena manager in 1909 was Jack Huston as the team was 4.5 games ahead of the second place Salt Lake City Mormons/Livingston when the league folded. The Butte Miners placed third and the Boise Irrigators/Bozeman Irrigators finished fourth.

The six–team Union Association was formed in 1911 under the leadership of William Henry Lucas. The Helena Senators were charter members of the Class D level league. The 1911 Helena Senators finished in 5th place with a 60–78 record, ending the season 31.0 games behind the first place Great Falls team. The Senators were managed by Charles Irby.

On June 1, 1911, Helena pitcher D.F. Byrd threw a no-hitter in a 2–1 victory over the Boise Irrigators.

In 1912, the Helena Senators continued play as members of the Union Association. The 1912 Senators placed 6th and last in the six–team Union Association with a record of 50–83, finishing 32.5 games behind the first place Missoula team. The Helena manager was again Charles Irby.

The Helena Senators finished fifth in the 1913 Union Association standings. Helena ended the season with a 52–67 record, playing under manager Danny Shay, finishing 25.5 games behind the champion Great Falls Electrics.

The 1914 Union Association folded in mid–season. Helena placed fourth overall in the league standings with a 27–53 record, playing under managers Jess Garrett and Bill Quigley. The Union Association permanently disbanded on August 5, 1914. The top two teams in the Union Association standings, the Ogden Canners and Salt Lake City Skyscrapers, played out their 1914 seasons with 16 games against each other.

Helena was without minor league baseball until the Helena Phillies began play in the 1978 Pioneer League. Today, the Helena Senators moniker has been adopted by Helena youth baseball.

== The ballpark ==
The name of the Helena Senators' minor league ballpark is not directly referenced. Fort Harrison Park was noted to have hosted other organized baseball during the era.

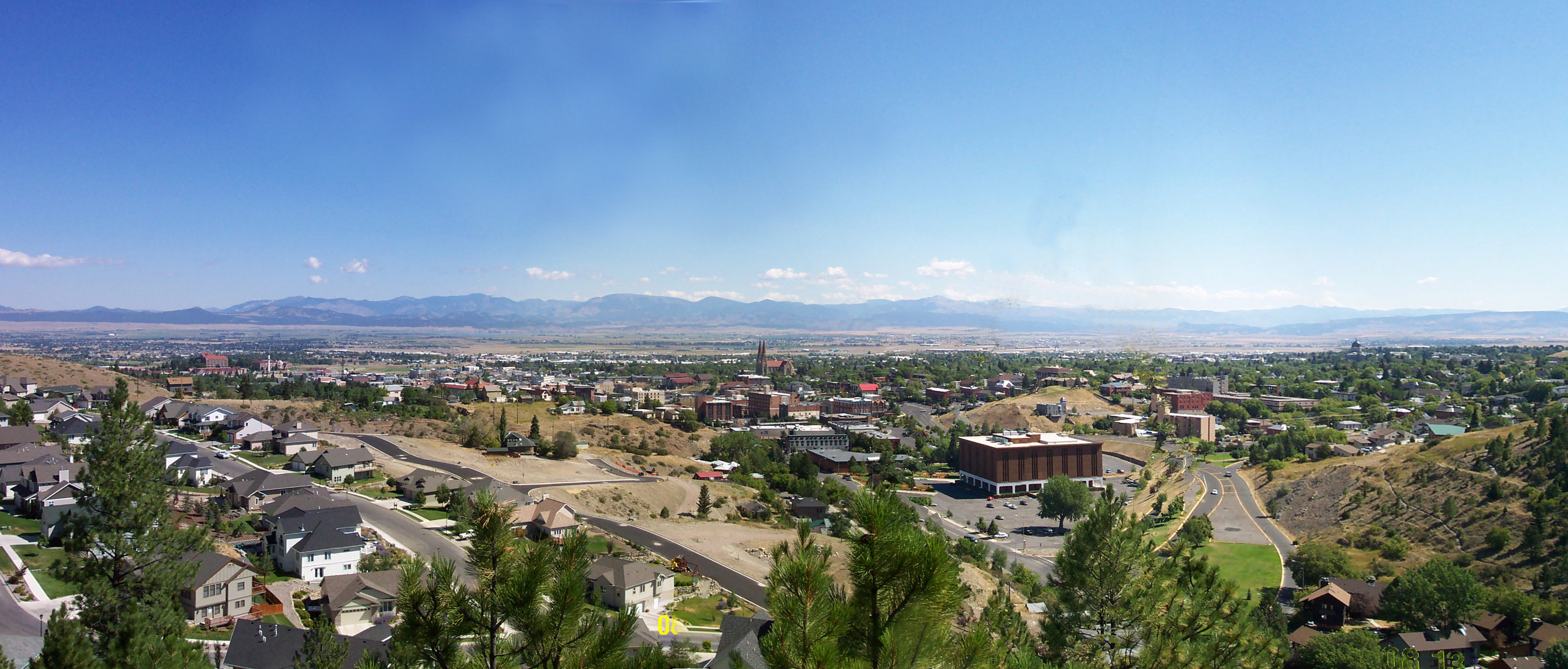
(2006) Helena, Montana

== Timeline ==
Year(s)	# Yrs.	Team	Level	League
1892	1	Helena	Class B	Montana State League
1900	1	Helena Senators	Independent	Montana State League
1902	1	Helena Senators	Class B	Pacific Northwest League
1903	1	Helena Senators	Class A	Pacific Northwest League
1905	1	Helena Senators	Independent	Montana State League
1909	1	Helena Senators	Class D	Inter-Mountain League
1911–1914	4	Helena Senators	Class D	Union Association

== Year–by–year records ==
Stats Crew

Year	Record	Finish	Manager	Playoffs/notes
1892	29–21	1st	Con Strothers	League champions
1900	38–33	2nd	Carl Wood; Paddy Ryan /Jack Flannery	No playoffs held
1902	65–54	3rd	Jack Flannery	No playoffs held
1903	40–62	8th	John Flannery / Fred Carish	Disbanded August 16
1905	00–00	N/A	Jack Flannery	1905 league records unknown
1909	43–19	1st	John Huston	League disbanded July 25; League champions
1911	60–78	5th	Charles Irby	No playoffs held
1912	50–83	6th	Charles Irby	No playoffs held
1913	52–67	5th	Danny Shay	No playoffs held
1914	27–53	4th	Jess Garrett / William Quimby	No playoffs held

== Notable alumni ==
- Joe Tinker (1900) Inducted Baseball Hall of Fame, 1946
- Del Baker (1911–1912)
- Pat Bohen (1913)
- George Bristow (1903)
- Ed Bruyette (1902)
- Fred Carisch (1903)
- Dad Clark (1914)
- Walter Coleman (1900)
- George Darby (1892)
- Andy Dunning (1892)
- Ralph Frary (1903)
- Julie Freeman (1892)
- Bill George (1892)
- Russ Hall (1900)
- Pat Hannivan (1902)
- Bill Hassamaer (1892)
- Gil Hatfield (1892)
- Tom Hernon (1892)
- Ed Holly (1902)
- Jim Kelly (1912)
- Jack Kibble (1911)
- Joe Marshall (1900)
- Harry Maupin (1900)
- Gus McGinnis (1892)
- Joe Miller (1892)
- Hap Morse (1912)
- Ambrose Puttmann (1903)
- Don Rader (1914)
- Skipper Roberts (1911)
- Solly Salisbury (1900)
- Danny Shay (1913, MGR)
- Walt Slagle (1902)
- Jack Sullivan (1902)
- Gus Thompson (1902–1903)
- Harry Thompson (1911–1913)
- Art Twineham (1892)
- Jimmy Wiggs (1902–1903)
- Mutt Williams (1913)
- Charlie Ziegler (1903)
- Helena Senators players
