= Los Angeles (Pacific National League) =

Los Angeles Nationals
- 1903; Los Angeles, California

Minor league affiliations
- Class: Class A (1903)
- League: Pacific National League (1903)

Major league affiliations
- Team: None

Minor league titles
- League titles (0): None

Team data
- Name: Los Angeles Nationals (1903)
- Ballpark: Prager Park (1903)

The Los Angeles Nationals were a minor league baseball team based in Los Angeles, California. In 1903, the Los Angeles Nationals were charter members of the Class A level Pacific National League and folded during the season, despite having the best record in the league. The Los Angeles franchise was placed by the Pacific National League to rival the Los Angeles Angels of the Pacific Coast League. The Nationals hosted home games at Prager Park.

== History ==
Los Angeles first hosted minor league baseball in 1892, when the Los Angeles Seraphs began play as members of the Class A level California League.

In 1903, the Los Angeles franchise began the season as charter members of the eight–team, Class A level Pacific National League. In the era, Class A was the highest level of minor league play. Beginning the 1903 season, the Pacific Northwest League had changed its name to become the "Pacific National League." This was a result of the California League expanding north into Seattle and Portland and changing its name to become the Pacific Coast League. As a result, the Pacific Northwest League placed franchises in Los Angeles, Portland, Seattle and San Francisco to rival the Pacific Coast League. The new Los Angeles Pacific National League team was nicknamed the "Nationals," designed to be in direct competition with the Pacific Coast League Los Angeles Angels franchise.

On April 14, 1903, Los Angeles began Pacific National League play with the other league teams. The Pacific National League began play with teams based in Los Angeles, Seattle (Seattle Chinooks), Portland (Portland Green Gages) and San Francisco (San Francisco Pirates), cities which also hosted rival teams in the Pacific Coast League. The Butte Miners, Helena Senators, Spokane Indians and Tacoma Tigers completed the league charter members. The league did not complete the season with all eight franchises, Los Angeles included. On July 1, 1903, the Portland Green Gages moved to become the Salt Lake City Elders. On August 15, 1903, the Tacoma and Helena franchises both folded from the league.

On August 21, 1903, the Los Angeles franchise folded, along with the San Francisco Pirates. At the time they folded, the Nationals had an overall record of 65–42, playing the season under the direction of manager Charlie Reilly. The Nationals' .607 winning percentage was the highest in the Pacific National League.

Los Angeles did not host a Pacific National League franchise when the league continued play in 1904. The Los Angeles Angels continued play in the 1904 Pacific Coast League.

== The ballpark ==
The 1903 Los Angeles Nationals hosted home minor league games at Prager Park. The ballpark opened for the 1903 season and later hosted the Los Angeles Angels of the Pacific Coast League from 1904 to 1911.

== Year–by–year record ==
| Year | Record | Finish | Manager | Playoffs/notes |
|---|---|---|---|---|
| 1903 | 65–42 | NA | Charlie Reilly | Team folded August 21 |

== Notable alumni ==
- Dad Clark (1903)
- Dick Egan (1903)
- Bill Gannon (1903)
- Russ Hall (1903)
- Jack Hardy (1903)
- Homer Hillebrand (1903)
- Ed Householder (1903)
- Glenn Liebhardt (1903)
- Charlie Reilly (1903, MGR)
- Elmer Stricklett (1903)
- Grant Thatcher (1903)
- Jake Thielman (1903)

== See also ==
- Los Angeles (minor league baseball) players
- List of baseball parks in Los Angeles
