= Seattle Chinooks =

- 1903; Seattle, Washington

Minor league affiliations
- Class: Class A (1903)
- League: Pacific National League (1903)

Major league affiliations
- Team: None

Minor league titles
- League titles (0): None

Team data
- Name: Seattle Chinooks (1903)
- Ballpark: YMCA Park (1903)

The Seattle Chinooks were a minor league baseball team based in Seattle, Washington. In 1903, the Seattle Chinooks became charter members of the Class A level Pacific National League, placing third in their only season of play. The franchise was placed in Seattle by the Pacific National League opposite the Seattle Siwashes of the Pacific Coast League. The Chinooks hosted minor league home games at YMCA Park.

== History ==
In 1903, the Seattle Chinooks team were charter members of the eight-team Class A level Pacific National League. At the time, Class A was the highest level of minor league play. Beginning the season, the Pacific Northwest League had changed its name to become the Pacific National League. This was a result of the California League expanding north into Seattle and Portland and changing its name to become the Pacific Coast League (PCL). As a result, the Pacific Northwest League placed franchises in Los Angeles, Portland, Seattle, and San Francisco to match the PCL teams in those cities. The new Seattle Pacific Northwest League team was named the "Chinooks," and the PCL team was the Seattle Siwashes.

On April 14, 1903, the Chinooks began Pacific National League play with the other league teams. The Pacific National League began play with four teams that had rival PCL teams: Seattle, the Los Angeles Nationals, Portland Greengages, and San Francisco Pirates. The Butte Miners, Helena Senators, Spokane Indians and Tacoma Tigers completed the league membership. On July 1, 1903, Portland moved to become the Salt Lake City Elders. On August 15, Tacoma and Helena folded from the league, with San Francisco and Los Angeles folding on August 12.

With the Pacific National League ending the season with four teams, Seattle placed third in the final standings. The Chinooks had a record of 78–71, playing the season under manager Dan Dugdale. Seattle finished 8 games behind the first place Butte Miners in the final standings.

Seattle did not host a Pacific National League team when the league continued play in 1904. The Siwashes continued play in the PCL.

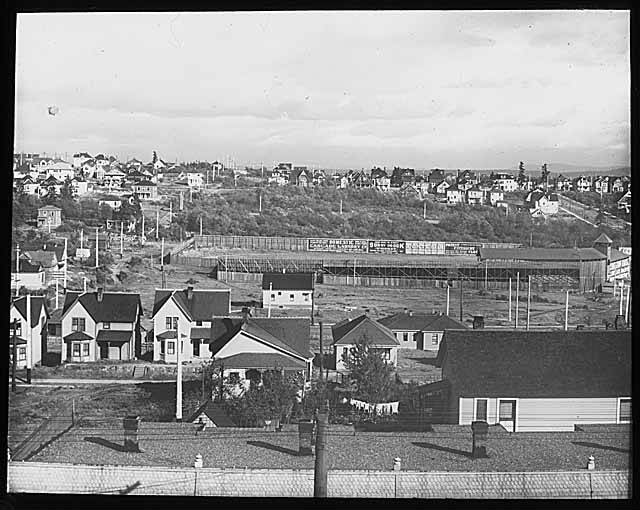
(1902) YMCA baseball field at 14th and Jefferson, Seattle.

== The ballpark ==
The Chinooks hosted home minor league games at YMCA Park, also known as Athletic Park. Opened in 1895 at the corner of 14th and Jefferson streets, the ballpark closed after the 1903 season. Today, Seattle University's Championship Field soccer stadium occupies a large portion of the site of YMCA Park.

== Record ==
Year	Record	Finish	Manager	Playoffs/notes
1903	78–71	3rd	Dan Dugdale	No playoffs held

== Notable alumni ==
- Bob Brown (1903)
- Dan Dugdale (1903, manager)
- Jerry Freeman (1903)
- Pat Hannivan (1903)
- Jack Hickey (1903)
- Bill Hogg (1903)
- Billy Hulen (1903)
- Harry Maupin (1903)
- Ike Rockenfield (1903)
- Elmer Stricklett (1903)
- George Treadway (1903)

== See also ==
- Seattle Chinooks players
