= Ambrose Puttmann =

American baseball player (1880–1936)

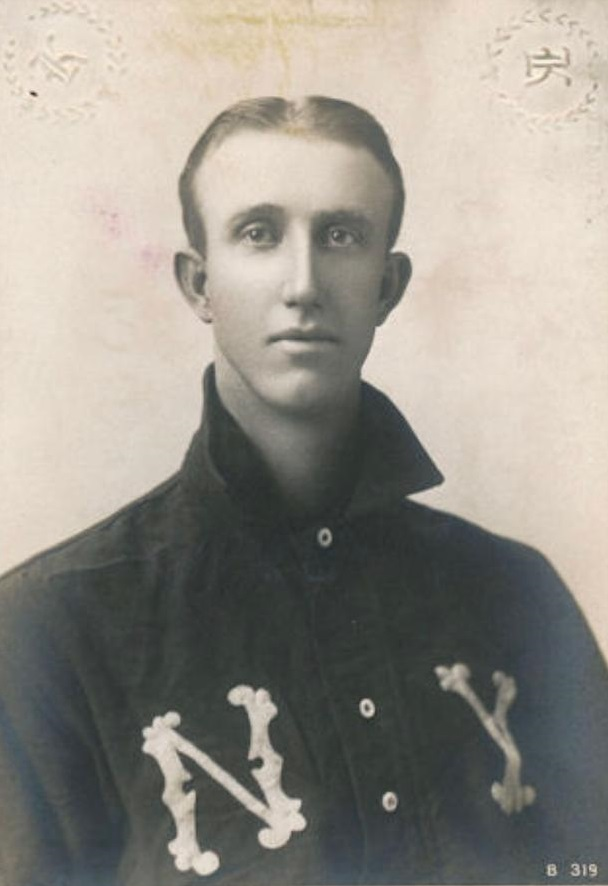
- Pitcher
- Born: September 9, 1880; Cincinnati, Ohio, U.S.
- Died: June 21, 1936 (aged 55); Jamaica, New York, U.S.
- Batted: Unknown Threw: Left

MLB debut
- September 4, 1903, for the New York Highlanders

Last MLB appearance
- May 10, 1906, for the St. Louis Cardinals

MLB statistics
- Win–loss record: 8–9
- Earned run average: 3.58
- Strikeouts: 85
- Stats at Baseball Reference

Teams
- New York Highlanders (1903–1905); St. Louis Cardinals (1906)

Ambrose Nicholas Puttmann (September 9, 1880 – June 21, 1936) was an American professional baseball pitcher. A left-hander, he played in parts of four Major League Baseball seasons, from 1903 to 1906, with the New York Highlanders and the St. Louis Cardinals.

== Early life and career ==
Puttmann was born on September 9, 1880, in Cincinnati, Ohio. He began his baseball career playing for teams in the West End of Cincinnati before joining a club in Washington Court House in 1902. He ended his season with a 27–16 win–loss record and signed with the Helena Senators of the Pacific National League in 1903, taking the spot of Jimmy Wiggs. Puttmann played for both Helena and the Spokane Indians, also of the Pacific National League, in 1903.

== New York Highlanders ==
In September 1903, he was acquired by the New York Highlanders from Spokane, with manager Clark Griffith reportedly discovering him. He made his major league debut on September 4 against the Washington Senators, relieving John Deering and allowing two runs, one of which was earned, and striking out three batters in 5.0 innings. He appeared in two more games for the Highlanders in September, throwing complete game victories against the St. Louis Browns on September 24 and the Detroit Tigers on September 29. He ended the year with a 0.95 earned run average in 19.0 innings.

Following the 1903 season, the National Baseball Commission ruled that Puttmann could play with New York in 1904 not because he jumped to the club before the season concluded, but because the Highlanders drafted him in the fall. He was subsequently fined $200 by the Spokane club for deserting the team.

Puttmann split the 1904 season with the Highlanders and Providence Grays of the Eastern League. He appeared in nine games with New York from April 16 to October 10, winning twice while ending the season with a 2.74 ERA. He threw a complete game shutout in his final game of the year on October 12 against the Boston Red Sox. He pitched in seven games with Providence, finishing with a 6–1 win-loss record. He began the 1905 season with New York, but was sent back to Providence in July after appearing in 10 games. He returned to the Highlanders in September and pitched in seven more games, ending the year with a 2–7 win-loss record and a .313 batting average as a hitter.

== St. Louis Cardinals and return to minor leagues ==
In November 1905, the Highlanders sold Puttmann's contract to the Toronto Maple Leafs. However, by April 1906, he was back with the Yankees in spring training and sold to the St. Louis Cardinals. He appeared in four games with St. Louis, winning two and losing two in his four starts with a 5.30 ERA.

In May, he was sold to the Louisville Colonels of the American Association (1902–1997). He ended the 1906 season for Louisville with a 18–17 record. Puttmann remained with Louisville through the end of the 1909 season, winning 42 games in 1907. In 1909, an arm injury led to him playing first base for a team in the Blue Grass League, and by September he was training to transition from a pitcher to a first baseman. He eventually joined the Petersburg Goobers in 1910, before pitching for the Galveston Sand Crabs in 1911.

== Semi-pro baseball career ==
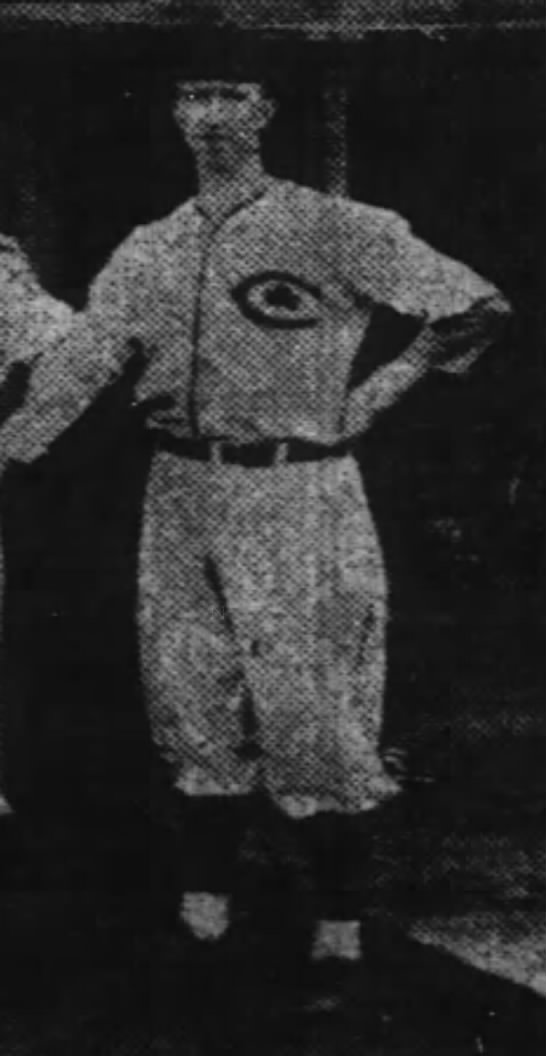
Puttmann in 1914 with the semi-pro Cincinnati Shamrocks.

Puttmann left professional baseball after the 1911 season, and became manager and pitcher of the semi-pro Price Hill Knights of Columbus team in the Spinney League in 1912. He managed the Cincinnati Shamrocks beginning in 1914. and was named manager of the Holy Family club of the Catholic Athletic Baseball League in 1916. He would go on to pitch and manage for several semi-pro teams in Cincinnati and also umpired in semi-pro and major league exhibition games.

== Personal life ==
Puttmann married Louise Rothan of Cincinnati following the 1904 season. Together they had eight children. After his playing career, he operated a shoe store in Price Hill from 1912 to 1930 and later worked at a liquor store. Puttmann died on June 21, 1936, after suffering a heart attack while visiting a friend in New York City.
