= San Francisco Pirates =

- 1903; San Francisco, California

Minor league affiliations
- Class: Class A (1903)
- League: Pacific National League (1903)

Major league affiliations
- Team: None

Minor league titles
- League titles (0): None

Team data
- Name: San Francisco Pirates (1903)
- Ballpark: National Park (1903)

The San Francisco Pirates were a minor league baseball team based in San Francisco, California. In 1903, the San Francisco Pirates played a partial season as charter members of the Class A level Pacific National League, before folding during the season. The Pirates hosted home games at National Park.

== History ==
San Francisco first hosted minor league baseball in 1878, when the San Francisco Athletics began play as members of the Pacific League.

In 1903, the San Francisco "Pirates" team became charter members of the eight–team Class A level Pacific National League. Class A was the highest level of minor leagues in the era. Beginning the season, the Pacific Northwest League had changed its name to become the Pacific National League. This was a result of the California League expanding north into Seattle and Portland and changing its name to become the Pacific Coast League. As a result, the Pacific Northwest League placed franchises in Los Angeles and San Francisco to rival the Pacific Coast League. The new San Francisco Pacific Northwest League team was named the "Pirates."

The San Francisco Pirates began Pacific National League play on April 14, 1903, with the other league teams. The Pacific National League began play with teams based in Seattle (Seattle Chinooks), Los Angeles (Los Angeles Nationals), Portland (Portland Green Gages) and San Francisco, cities which all also hosted teams in the Pacific Coast League. The Butte Miners, Helena Senators, Spokane Indians and Tacoma Tigers completed the league. On July 1, 1903, the Portland Green Gages moved to become the Salt Lake City Elders. On August 15, 1903, Tacoma and Helena folded from the league, with San Francisco soon to follow.

On August 21, 1903, the San Francisco Pirates folded along with Los Angeles. At the time they folded, the Pirates had a record of 56–52, playing the season under manager John McCloskey.

Pirate player Joe Marshall led all of professional baseball with 26 home runs in 1903. After the San Francisco Pirates folded, Marshall was acquired by the Pittsburgh Pirates to complete the season.

San Francisco did not host a team when the Pacific National League continued play in 1904. The San Francisco Seals continued play in the 1904 Pacific Coast League.

== The ballpark ==
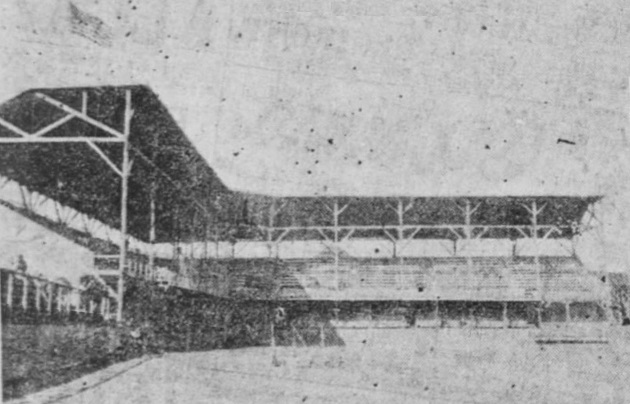
National Park

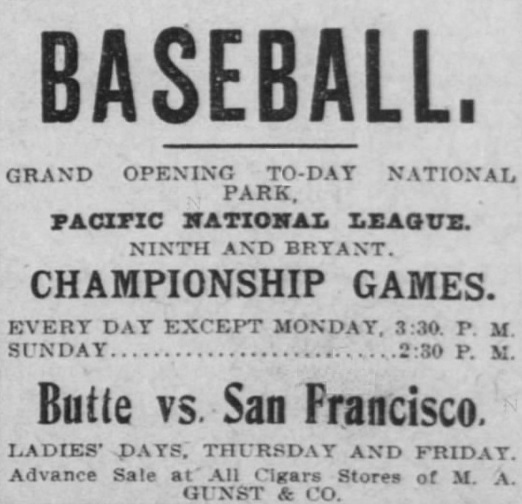
Opening Day advertisement

The 1903 San Francisco Pirates hosted home minor league games at National Park. The ballpark was located on the corner of 9th and Bryant Streets.

== Year–by–year record ==
Year	Record	Finish	Manager	Playoffs/notes
1903	56–52	NA	John McCloskey	Team folded August 21

== Notable alumni ==
- George Borchers (1903)
- Jack Burns (1903)
- Bones Ely (1903)
- Martin Glendon (1903)
- Lefty Houtz (1903)
- John McCloskey (1903, MGR)
- Joe Marshall (1903)
- Jack Pfiester (1903)
- Jesse Stovall (1903)
- Farmer Weaver (1903)
- Jimmy Wiggs (1903)
- Dave Zearfoss (1903)

== See also ==
San Francisco Pirates players
