= Skel Roach =

American baseball player (1871–1958)

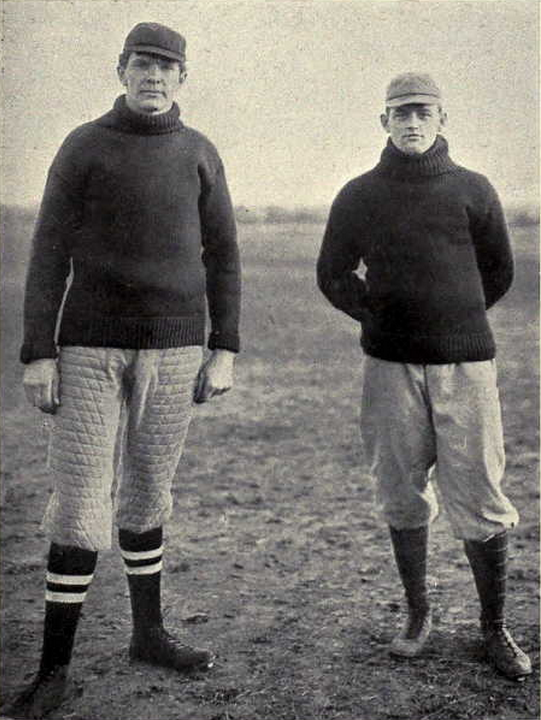
- Roach (left) in 1903
- Pitcher
- Born: Rudolph Charles Weichbrodt; October 20, 1871; Danzig, German Empire
- Died: March 9, 1958 (aged 86); Oak Park, Illinois, U.S.
- Batted: Right Threw: Right

MLB debut
- August 9, 1899, for the Chicago Orphans

Last MLB appearance
- August 9, 1899, for the Chicago Orphans

MLB statistics
- Win–loss record: 1–0
- Strikeouts: 0
- ERA: 3.00
- Stats at Baseball Reference

Teams
- Chicago Orphans (1899)

Rudolph Charles "Skel" Roach (born Rudolph Charles Weichbrodt; October 20, 1871 – March 9, 1958) was an American professional baseball player and coach. He played professional baseball from 1895 to 1905, including one game in Major League Baseball with the Chicago Orphans on August 9, 1899. He was also a college baseball coach for the Lewis Institute (now part of Illinois Institute of Technology), the University of Michigan, and Indiana University. He later became an attorney practicing in the Chicago area.

== Early years ==
Roach was born in 1871 at what was then known as Danzig, German Empire, and is now Gdańsk, Poland. His birth name was Rudolph Charles Weichbrodt. He emigrated to the United States in 1880.

== Baseball player ==
Roach began an eleven-year career in professional baseball at age 23 with the Des Moines Prohibitionists of the Western Association. He compiled a 13–7 record for Des Moines in 1895.

Roach appeared in only one major league game, pitching a complete game victory for the Chicago Orphans on August 9, 1899.

Roach played nine seasons of minor league baseball from 1895 to 1905. He played for Des Moines Prohibitionists (1895), Mobile Blackbirds (1896, 1898), Kansas City Blues (1897), Omaha Omahogs (1900–1901), Des Moines Hawkeyes (1900), Butte Miners (1902–1903), Portland Browns (1904) and Seattle Siwashes. His best season as a pitcher was 1903 when he won 22 games and lost nine with 137 strikeouts for the Butte Miners in the Pacific National League. His final season as a minor league player was 1905, when he won 15 games and maintained a 2.47 earned run average for the Seattle Siwashes in the Pacific Coast League.

== Baseball coach ==
Roach coached baseball at the Lewis Institute (now part of Illinois Institute of Technology) from 1899 to 1902, leading the team to championships all four years.

In 1903, he was hired as the baseball coach at the University of Michigan. Upon his arrival at Michigan in March 1903, The Michigan Alumnus wrote: "Mr. Roach, the new baseball coach, came to Ann Arbor to take charge of the men, March 20. He is a big fellow, and bears all the marks of a ball-player. He has been playing professional ball for a number of years past, at Butte, Montana, in the Pacific-Northwest league, and also, for a short time with a Chicago league team." He led the Wolverines to a 12–5 record in 1903.

Roach later coached baseball at Indiana University.

== Later years ==
Roach later attended law school at Northwestern University and became an attorney. He married Louise Otillie Eichman. At the time of the 1910 Census, Roach and his wife were living in Chicago with his mother-in-law, Otillie Eichmann. His occupation was listed as lawyer. At the time of the 1920 Census, Roach and his wife were living in Oak Park, Illinois with two daughters, Louise and Margaret. His occupation was recorded at the time as a lawyer in private practice. In 1930, he was living in Oak Park with daughters Louise, Margaret and Helen; he was employed as a lawyer in general practice.

Roach died in 1958 at Oak Park, Illinois.
