= Patrick Kearney (disambiguation) =

Patrick Kearney (born 1939) is an American serial killer who preyed on young men in California during the 1970s.

Patrick Kearney may also refer to:

- Pat Kearney (broadcaster) (1955–2014), American broadcaster
- Patrick J. Kearney, American politician
- Patrick Kearney (guitarist) (born 1970), Canadian-born classical guitarist
- Patrick Kearney (hurler) (born 1987), Irish hurler
- Patrick Kearney (playwright) (1893–1933), American playwright
- Pat Karney (born Patrick Kearney, 1947/1948–2026), British politician

== See also ==
- Pat Kearney (disambiguation)
- Patrick Kerney (born 1976), former American football defensive end
