= List of baseball parks in Los Angeles =

This is a list of venues used for professional and some amateur baseball in Los Angeles, California, United States, and surrounding neighborhoods and cities such as Hollywood, Vernon, Venice and Anaheim.

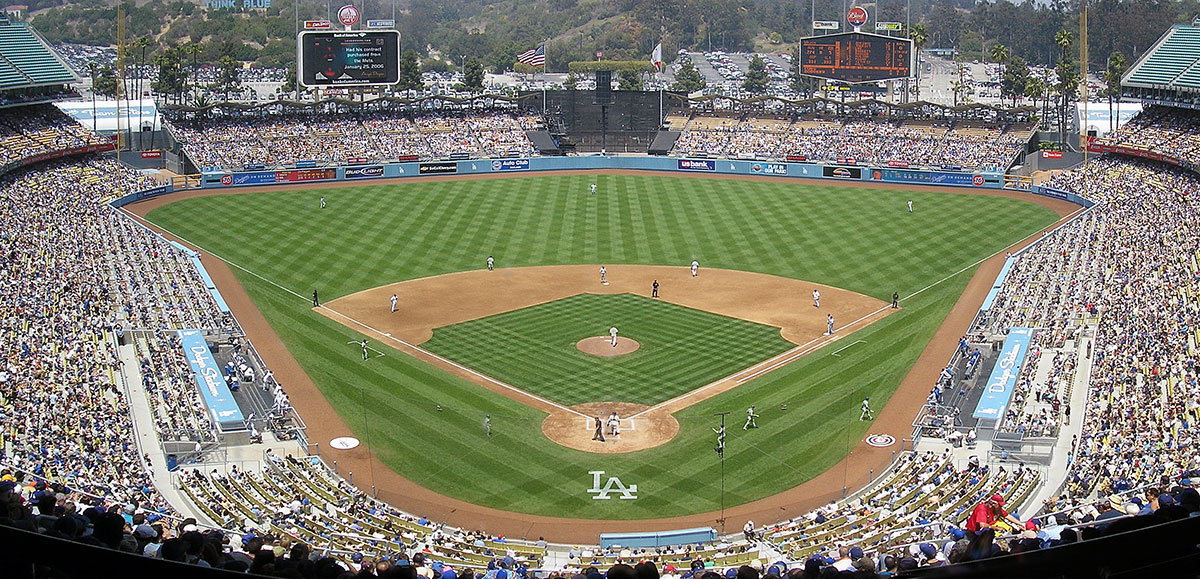
Dodger Stadium

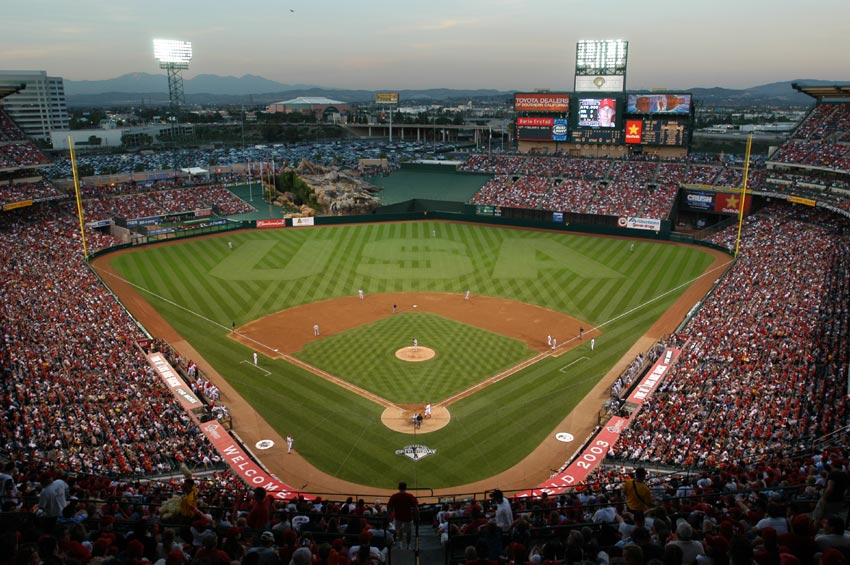
Angel Stadium

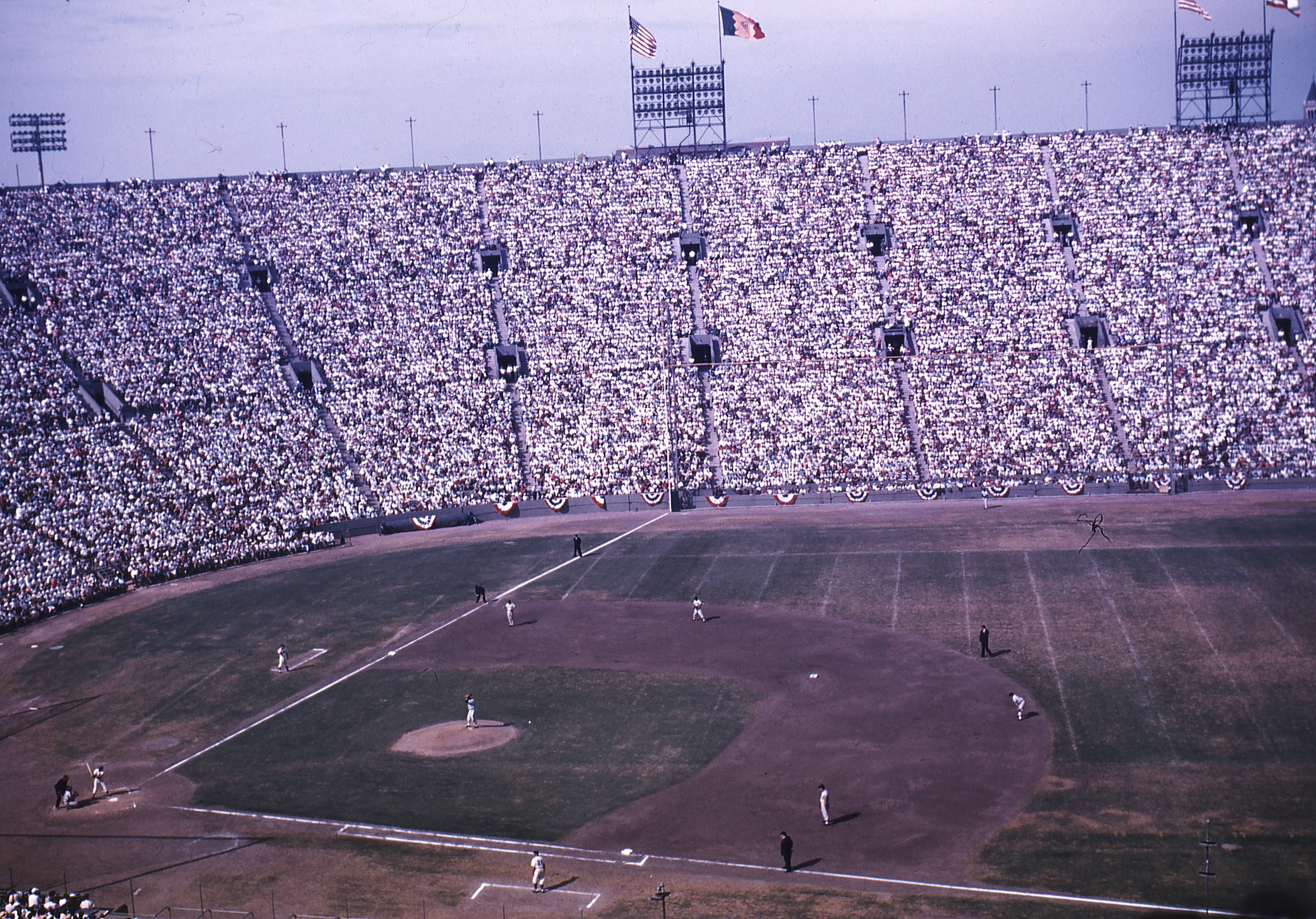
Coliseum

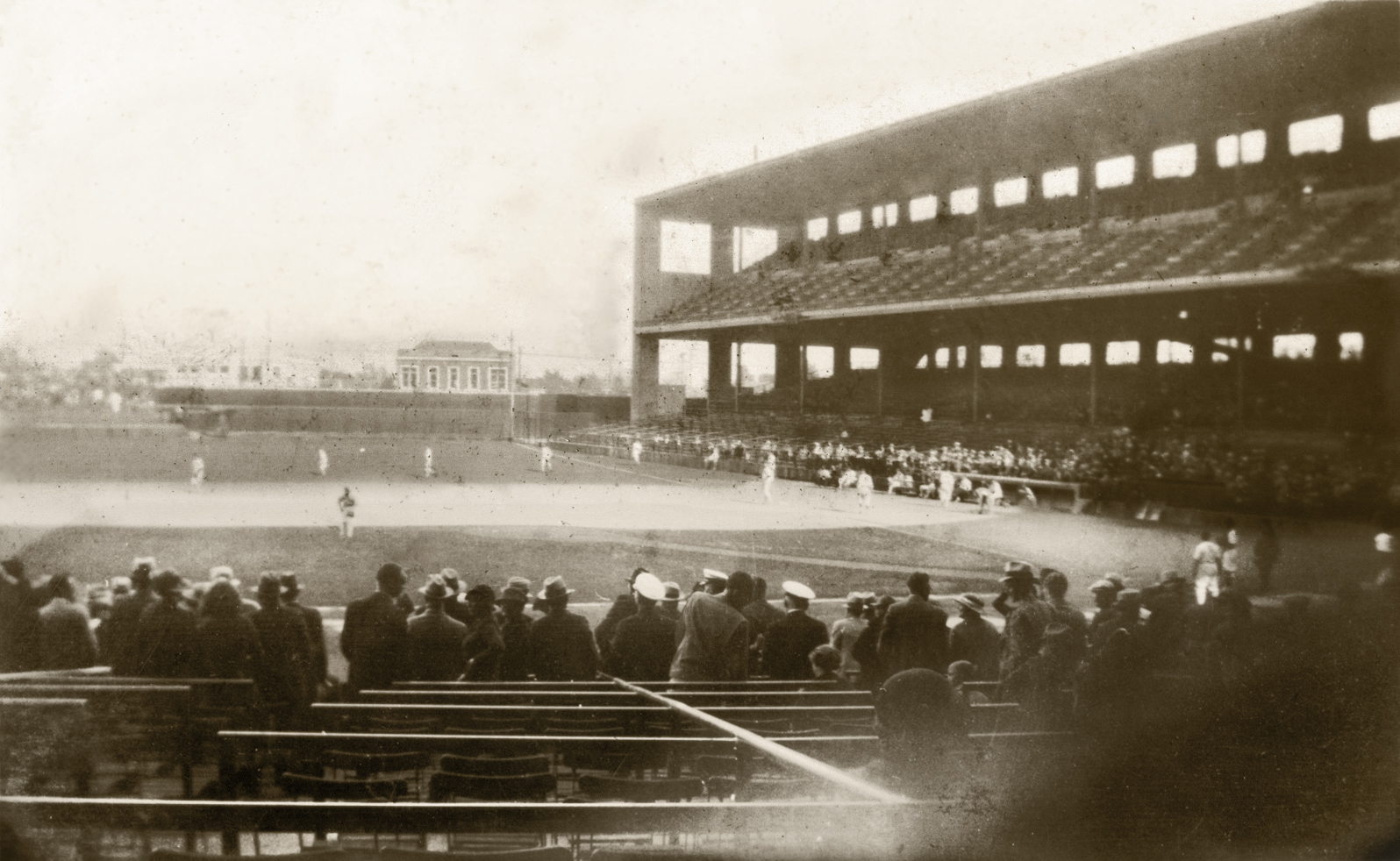
Wrigley Field

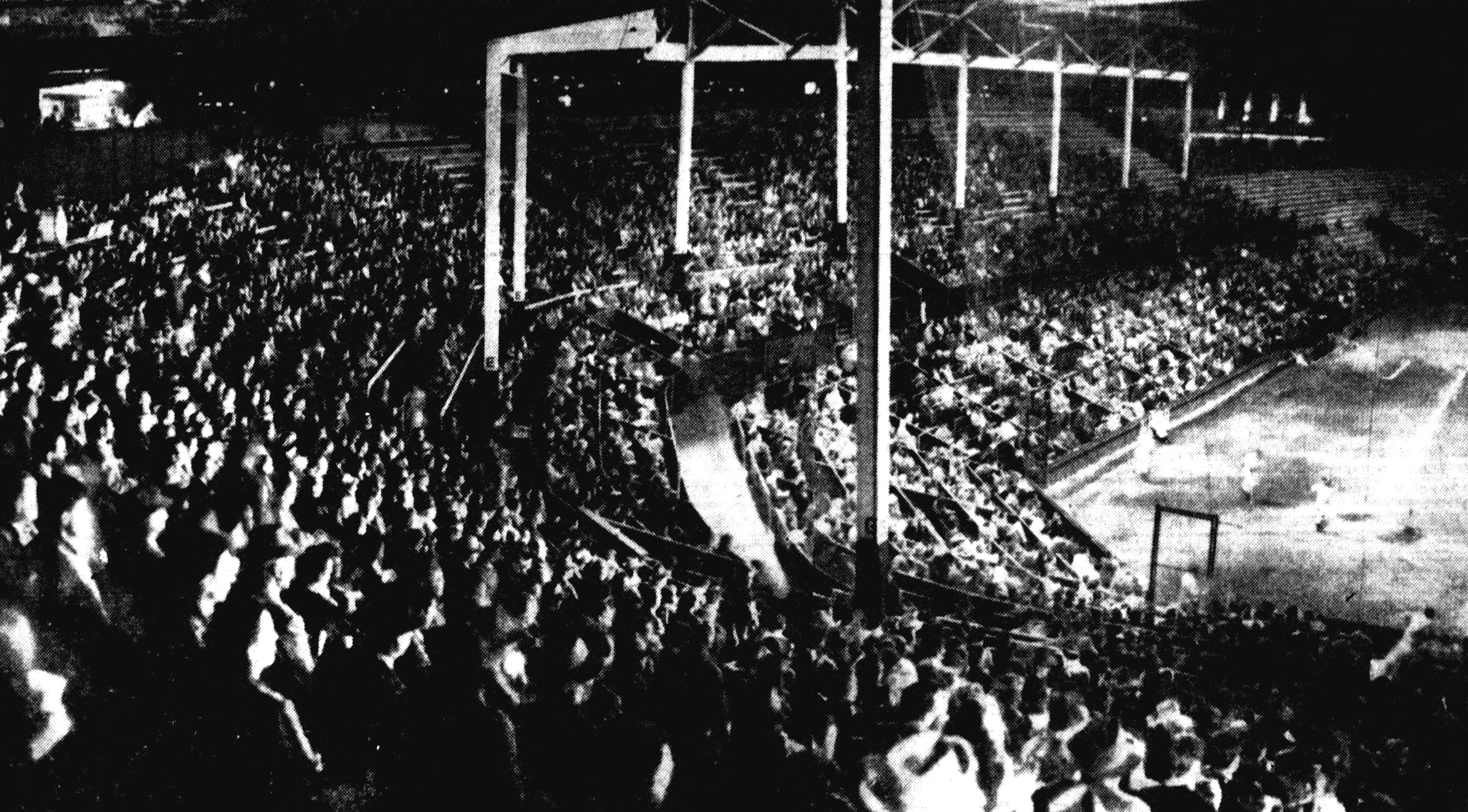
Gilmore Field

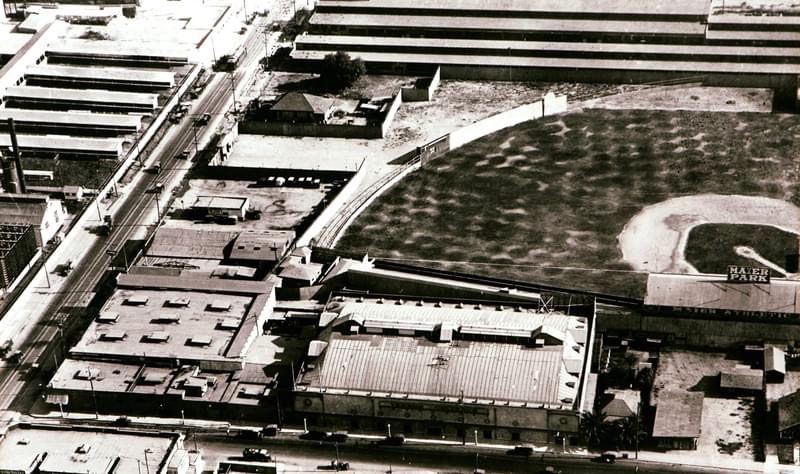
Maier Park

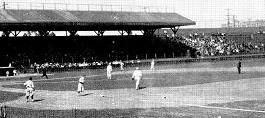
Washington Park

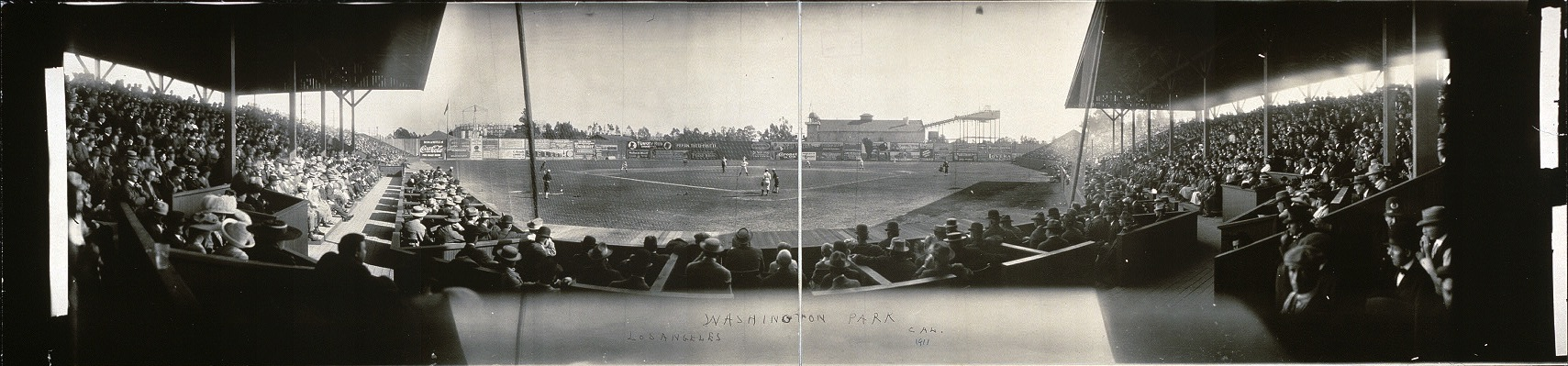
Chutes Park

== Professional ==
Athletic Park
Los Angeles Seraphs/Angels – California League (1892–1893 part)
Location: Seventh Street (south); Alameda Street (west); Mateo Street (east); Palmetto Street a block's width away to the north.

Ballpark within Chutes Park opened around 1895.
Home of:

Los Angeles Angels – California League (1901–02) / Pacific Coast League (1903–1910)
Vernon Tigers – PCL (1909–1910) (selected games)

Location: north–center edge of the amusement park which was bounded by Grand Avenue (west), Main Street (east), Washington Boulevard (north, which bordered third base line), 21st Street (south)
Currently: LA Mart and parking lots

Prager Park
Home of: Los Angeles Nationals – Pacific National League (1903) – disbanded Aug 21
Location: Grand Avenue (west), Washington Boulevard (south), Hill Street (east) – "across the street from Chutes Park"

Maier Park (I) and (III)
Home of:

Vernon Tigers – Pacific Coast League (1909–1912, mid–1915 – 1925) (selected games)
Los Angeles Maiers – Southern California Trolley League (1910 only)
Los Angeles McCormicks – Southern California Trolley League (1910 only)

Location: in Vernon, California – Santa Fe Avenue (east, left field); buildings and 38th Street (north, third base); Irving street (west, first base); and industrial buildings (south, right field)

Washington Park
Home of:

Los Angeles Angels – Pacific Coast League (1911 – late 1925)
Vernon Tigers / Venice Tigers – PCL (1911–1925) (selected games)

Location: Address listed as 218 West Washington Boulevard. On a large block bounded by Washington (north), Main (east), 21st (south), Hill Street (west), overlaying Chutes Park site
Currently: LA Mart and parking lots

Maier Park (II)
Home of: Venice Tigers – PCL (1913 – mid–1915) (selected games)
Location: in the Venice district – southwest corner of Virginia Avenue (now South Venice Boulevard) and Washington Boulevard (now Abbot Kinney Boulevard)

White Sox Park (I) aka Anderson Park
Home of: Los Angeles White Sox – California Winter League 1920–1923
Location: Boyle Heights District; East 4th Street (south, right field); buildings and South Clarence Street (east, left field); railroad yards (west, first base) [per Sanborn map]
Currently: commercial businesses

White Sox Park (II)
Home of: Los Angeles White Sox – California Winter League beginning 1924
Location: Compton Avenue northeast corner East 38th (later 41st) Street [per city directories]
Currently: Ross Snyder Recreation Center

Wrigley Field
Home of:

Los Angeles Angels – Pacific Coast League (late 1925 – 1957)
Hollywood Stars – PCL (1926–1935, 1938)
Los Angeles Angels – American League (1961 only)

Location: Avalon Boulevard (east, right field); 41st Street (north, left field); 42nd Place (south, first base); San Pedro Street (west, third base) – about 1½ miles straight south of Washington Park
Currently: Gilbert W. Lindsay Community Center

Gilmore Stadium
Home of: Hollywood Stars – PCL (while awaiting completion of Gilmore Field)
Location: west of Gilmore Field
Currently: CBS Television City

Gilmore Field
Home of: Hollywood Stars – PCL (1939–57)
Location: south side of Beverly Boulevard; between Genesee Avenue and The Grove Drive; between Gilmore Stadium (west) and Pan-Pacific Auditorium (east)

Home plate: northwest corner

Currently: parking lot for CBS Television City

Los Angeles Memorial Coliseum
Home of: Los Angeles Dodgers – National League (1958–61)
Location: 3911 South Figueroa Street

Dodger Stadium also known as Chavez Ravine Stadium
Home of:

Los Angeles Dodgers – National League (1962–present)
Los Angeles / California Angels – American League (1962–65)
Also used as a neutral site in the 2020 MLB postseason

Location: 1000 Vin Scully Avenue (orig. Elysian Park Avenue)

Angel Stadium also known as Anaheim Stadium and Edison International Field
Home of: California / Anaheim / Los Angeles Angels – American League (1966–present)
Location: 2000 Gene Autry Way; in Anaheim

== Amateur ==
Anteater Ballpark
Home of: UC Irvine Anteaters baseball (2002–present)
Location: On the campus of the University of California, Irvine in the Orange County city of that name.

Bovard Field
Home of: USC Trojans baseball (through 1973)
Location: On the campus of the University of Southern California.
Currently: E.F. Hutton Park (a quadrangle)

Dedeaux Field
Home of: USC Trojans baseball (1974–present)
Location: On the campus of the University of Southern California.

Eddy D. Field Stadium
Home of: Pepperdine Waves baseball (1973–present)
Location: On the campus of Pepperdine University in Malibu.

George C. Page Stadium
Home of: Loyola Marymount Lions baseball (1983–present)
Location: On the campus of Loyola Marymount University.

Jackie Robinson Stadium
Home of: UCLA Bruins baseball (1981–present)
Location: On the campus of the University of California, Los Angeles.

Matador Field
Home of: Cal State Northridge Matadors baseball (1961–present)
Location: On the campus of California State University, Northridge in the Los Angeles neighborhood of Northridge.

Blair Field
Home of: Long Beach State Dirtbags baseball (1993–present)
Location: Recreation Park, Long Beach, CA
Historically: Formerly professional minor league baseball and host of Area Code games.

== See also ==
- Lists of baseball parks

== Sources ==
- Peter Filichia, Professional Baseball Franchises, Facts on File, 1993.
- Phil Lowry, Green Cathedrals, several editions.
- Michael Benson, Ballparks of North America, McFarland, 1989.
- Lawrence Ritter, Lost Ballparks, Penguin, 1992.
