= Pacific National League =

Former minor league baseball competition

- Formerly: Pacific Northwest League
- Classification: Class A (1903); Class B (1904–1905)
- Sport: Minor League Baseball
- First season: 1903
- Folded: 1905
- President: William Henry Lucas (1903–1904); William Rishel (1905)
- No. of teams: 11
- Country: United States of America
- Most titles: 2 Boise Fruit Pickers / Boise Infants
- Related competitions: California League

The Pacific National League was a minor league baseball league that played from 1903 to 1905. The league evolved from its predecessor, the Pacific Northwest League and was a competitor of the newly formed Pacific Coast League. The league began play in 1903 as a Class A level league, the highest level of minor leagues in the era, before becoming a Class B level league in 1904 and 1905. Member teams were based in California, Idaho, Oregon, Montana, Utah and Washington.

== History ==
In 1903, the Pacific Northwest League changed its name to become the Pacific National League. This was a result of the independent California League deciding to expand north into Seattle and Portland and changing its name to the Pacific Coast League as a result. The Pacific Northwest League decided to oppose the move by placing franchises of its own in Los Angeles and San Francisco (San Francisco Pirates), with William Henry Lucas continuing as president of the newly named league.

The Class A level Pacific National League began play on April 14, 1903, with eight teams. The league had teams based in Seattle, Los Angeles, Portland and San Francisco, which all also had teams in the Pacific Coast League; these were complemented by teams in the smaller cities of Butte, Helena, Spokane and Tacoma. Travel would prove to be a challenge and on July 1, 1903, the Portland franchise was replaced by a new team in Salt Lake City. On August 15, Helena left the league, and was soon followed by Tacoma, Los Angeles and San Francisco, as the remaining four teams finished out the season.

With four cities left in 1904, the league was downgraded to Class B level league. 1904 league franchises were based in Boise, Butte, Salt Lake City and Spokane. In 1905, Ogden replaced Butte as the league remained a four–team league. The 1905 Pacific National League permanently folded on June 20, 1905, when the Salt Lake City Fruit Pickers disbanded. The league was expelled from the National Association on February 20, 1906, and never reformed.

== Pacific National League member teams ==
| Team name | City represented | Stadium | Year(s) active |
|---|---|---|---|
| Boise Fruit Pickers/ Boise Infants | Boise, Idaho | Riverside Park (10th & Miller) | 1904 to 1905 |
| Butte Miners | Butte, Montana | Columbia Gardens ballpark (east of city) | 1903 to 1904 |
| Helena Senators | Helena, Montana | Central Park, east of the Broadwater Hotel | 1903 |
| Los Angeles Nationals | Los Angeles, California | Prager Park | 1903 |
| Ogden Lobsters | Ogden, Utah | Glenwood Park (Madison, Monroe, & Canyon Road) | 1905 |
| Portland Green Gages | Portland, Oregon | National Park (8th & Hawthorne) | 1903 |
| Salt Lake City Elders/ Salt Lake City Fruit Pickers | Salt Lake City, Utah | Walker's Field | 1903 to 1905 |
| San Francisco Pirates | San Francisco, California | National Park (9th & Bryant) | 1903 |
| Seattle Chinooks | Seattle, Washington | YMCA Field | 1903 |
| Spokane Indians | Spokane, Washington | Natatorium Park | 1903 to 1905 |
| Tacoma Tigers | Tacoma, Washington | South 11th Street Grounds | 1903 |

== Standings & statistics ==
1903 Pacific National League
schedule

| Team standings | W | L | PCT | GB | Managers |
|---|---|---|---|---|---|
| Butte Miners | 85 | 62 | .578 | – | Jerry Kane / Walt Wilmot |
| Spokane Indians | 82 | 68 | .547 | 4½ | W.V. Garrett / C.H. Williams |
| Seattle Chinooks | 78 | 71 | .523 | 8 | Dan Dugdale |
| Portland Green Gages / Salt Lake City Elders | 56 | 91 | .381 | 29 | John Grim / John McCloskey |
| Los Angeles Nationals | 65 | 42 | .607 | NA | Charlie Reilly |
| San Francisco Pirates | 56 | 52 | .519 | NA | John McCloskey |
| Tacoma Tigers | 46 | 60 | .434 | NA | Byron McKibben |
| Helena Senators | 40 | 62 | .392 | NA | John Flannery / Fred Carish |

Portland (21–42) moved to Salt Lake City July 2; Tacoma and Helena disbanded August 16; Los Angeles and San Francisco disbanded August 21.

Player statistics
| Player | Team | Stat | Tot | Player | Team | Stat | Tot |
|---|---|---|---|---|---|---|---|
| Frank Huelsman | Spokane | BA | .392 | Pete Dowling | Butte | W | 30 |
| She Donahue | Portland/Salt Lake City | Runs | 114 | Pete Dowling | Butte | SO | 249 |
| She Donahue | Portland/Salt Lake City | Hits | 192 | Ernest Nichols | Spokane | Pct | .833; 20–4 |
| Joe Marshall | San Francisco | HR | 25 | | | | |

1904 Pacific National League
schedule

| Team standings | W | L | PCT | GB | Managers |
|---|---|---|---|---|---|
| Boise Fruit Pickers | 82 | 49 | .626 | – | John McCloskey |
| Spokane Indians | 73 | 57 | .562 | 8½ | Charlie Reilly |
| Butte Miners | 54 | 75 | .419 | 27 | Walt Wilmot |
| Salt Lake City Elders | 51 | 79 | .392 | 30½ | Dad Gimlin / Frederick Clarke |

Player statistics
| Player | Team | Stat | Tot | Player | Team | Stat | Tot |
|---|---|---|---|---|---|---|---|
| Bill Carney | Spokane | BA | .366 | Dan McFarlan | Boise | W | 30 |
| Ike Rockenfield | Spokane | Runs | 113 | Bill Hogg | Spokane | SO | 259 |
| Farmer Weaver | Boise | Hits | 188 | Dan McFarlan | Boise | Pct | .698; 30–13 |
| Ralph Frary | Spokane | HR | 13 | | | | |

1905 Pacific National League
schedule

| Team standings | W | L | PCT | GB | Managers |
|---|---|---|---|---|---|
| Boise Infants | 22 | 15 | .595 | – | John McCloskey / William Weaver |
| Ogden Lobsters | 20 | 17 | .541 | 2 | Walt Wilmot |
| Spokane Indians | 20 | 19 | .513 | 3 | Charlie Reilly |
| Salt Lake City Fruit Pickers | 13 | 24 | .351 | 9 | Frederick Clarke |

The league disbanded June 20 when Salt Lake City withdrew.

Player statistics
| Player | Team | Stat | Tot | Player | Team | Stat | Tot |
|---|---|---|---|---|---|---|---|
| Charles McIntyre | Boise | BA | .372 | Dan McFarlan | Boise | W | 8 |
| Eddie Hammond | Boise | Runs | 34 | Charles Steztz | Boise | SO | 70 |
| Charles McIntyre | Boise | Hits | 54 | Gus Thompson | Ogden | SO | 70 |
| Hugh Kellacky | Boise | HR | 5 | George Hodson | Boise | PCT | .833 5–1 |
