= Pat Kearney =

Pat Kearney may refer to:

- Bernard W. Kearney (1889–1976), known as Pat, U.S. Representative from New York
- Patrick J. Kearney (fl 2019–), member of the Massachusetts House of Representatives
- Pat Kearney (broadcaster) (1955–2014), American broadcaster
- Pat Karney (born Patrick Kearney, 1947/1948–2026), British politician

== See also ==
- Patrick Kearney (disambiguation)
