= Lefty Houtz =

American baseball player (1875–1959)

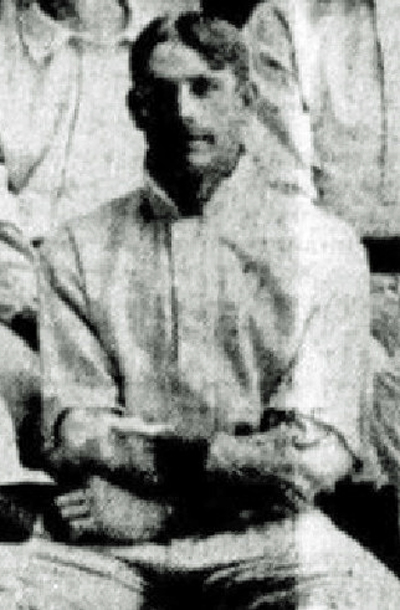
- Outfielder
- Born: September 4, 1875; Connersville, Indiana, U.S.
- Died: February 15, 1959 (aged 83); St. Marys, Ohio, U.S.
- Batted: Left Threw: Left

MLB debut
- July 23, 1899, for the Cincinnati Reds

Last MLB appearance
- July 26, 1899, for the Cincinnati Reds

MLB statistics
- Batting average: .235
- Home runs: 0
- Runs batted in: 0
- Stats at Baseball Reference

Teams
- Cincinnati Reds (1899)

Fred Fritz "Lefty" Houtz (September 4, 1875 – February 15, 1959) was an American outfielder in Major League Baseball. He played for the Cincinnati Reds in 1899 and also had a 12-year minor league career. Houtz stood at 5' 10" and weighed 170 lbs.

== Career ==
Lefty Houtz was born in Connersville, Indiana. He started his professional baseball career in 1899 with the Texas League's Galveston Sand Crabs and made an immediate impact. In 78 games that year, he batted .395 and slugged .673 with 17 home runs. He led the league in triples, home runs, hits, total bases, and slugging percentage.

Houtz was then acquired by the Cincinnati Reds, and he made his major league debut on July 23. Sporting Life later wrote of that day:

"All records were broken after acquisition of "Lefty" Houtz, who was hailed by the late Harry Weldon as the champion slugger of the Texas League. The afternoon that Houtz made his debut the stands were packed and overflow meetings were held along the lines."

Houtz played five games for the Reds from July 23 to July 26. He went 4 for 17 at the plate with 4 walks, for a .381 on-base percentage. He finished out the season with St. Paul of the Western League. On October 7, Sporting Life reported that Houtz ("the Texas League wonder") had been released outright from Cincinnati. He then played for two teams in 1900 and batted just .220.

In 1902, Houtz joined the Butte Miners of the Pacific Northwest League. He raised his batting average to .291, and Butte won the league championship. The following season, he moved to the Pacific National League's San Francisco Pirates and batted .286. He broke out again in 1904, with the Boise Fruit Pickers. Houtz was one of the PNL's top sluggers that season, batting .343 and pacing the circuit with 33 doubles and 18 triples while finishing second in total bases.

In 1905, Houtz played in the Pacific Coast League, and his batting average fell to .243. He was ordered to report to spring training with the National League's St. Louis Cardinals in early 1906 but did not play for the Cardinals in a regular season game. His five games in 1899 would remain the only major league experience of his career. Houtz instead spent 1906 and 1907 playing for the Montgomery Senators of the Southern Association. In May 1906, the Spokane Daily Chronicle reported that he was "hitting the ball hard", but his batting average that year was just .244. He then hit .258 in 1907.

Houtz went to the Central League's Zanesville Infants in 1908 and then to the Ohio State League's Lima Cigarmakers in 1910. In 1911, he batted .323 and led the OSL in slugging percentage, triples, and total bases. It was the third time in his career that he led a league in triples. He retired from professional baseball after that season.

Houtz died in 1959 in St. Marys, Ohio. He was buried in New St. Joseph Cemetery.
