= Danny Shay =

American baseball player (1876–1927)

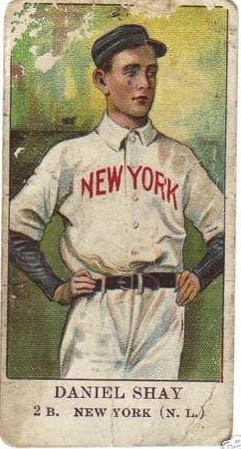
- Shortstop
- Born: November 8, 1876; Springfield, Ohio, U.S.
- Died: December 1, 1927 (aged 51); Kansas City, Missouri, U.S.
- Batted: Right Threw: Right

MLB debut
- April 30, 1901, for the Cleveland Blues

Last MLB appearance
- September 10, 1907, for the New York Giants

MLB statistics
- Batting average: .240
- Home runs: 2
- Runs batted in: 62
- Stats at Baseball Reference

Teams
- Cleveland Blues (1901); St. Louis Cardinals (1904–1905); New York Giants (1907)

Daniel Charles Shay (born Daniel Shea; (Note: After Shay's death, several sources reported that he changed the spelling of his name from Shea to Shay after retiring from baseball, but newspaper accounts throughout his career indicate that he spelled the name Shay by the time his playing career began.) November 8, 1876 – December 1, 1927) was an American professional baseball shortstop, manager and scout in the late 19th and early 20th centuries. Shay's baseball career was relatively mediocre, and he is probably most remembered for being acquitted in the shooting death of a black man in 1917.

The son of Irish immigrants, Shay was born in Springfield, Ohio. He played four seasons in Major League Baseball (MLB), for the Cleveland Blues (1901), the St. Louis Cardinals (1904-1905), and the New York Giants (1907). Even during his early baseball career, Shay had several interests outside of playing the game. He owned a cigar shop, several race horses and a minor league baseball team. Shay did not play much after a finger amputation in 1905. He served as a minor league manager between 1908 and 1917.

While managing the Milwaukee Brewers of the American Association during the 1917 season, Shay visited a hotel cafe in Indianapolis. He fatally shot black waiter Clarence Euell in an argument stemming from a request for sugar; he claimed self-defense. Race was a contentious issue in the city at that time, and during Shay's nine-day trial for murder, both the prosecutors and defense attorneys attempted to use racial or ethnic stereotypes to their advantage. Shay was acquitted of murder charges. In subsequent media coverage, the verdict was criticized as an injustice.

After being out of the game since his murder trial, Shay was hired as a scout in his last baseball role in 1923. He suffered a stroke and lost the use of his right arm and hand. Ten years after he was acquitted in the murder trial, he was found dead in a hotel room with a gunshot wound to the head. Authorities could not definitively rule out either suicide or murder.

== Early life and career ==
Shay was born in Springfield, Ohio, on November 8, 1876, to Irish immigrants. Around the time of Shay's birth, Springfield was a town characterized by tense race relations. Large numbers of black settlers arrived in the city from Kentucky in the wake of the Civil War. Black residents soon outnumbered whites, and they competed for jobs with working class white citizens like Shay's parents. Schools were integrated in Springfield when Shay was nine years old. He left Springfield by 1895 to begin his career in minor league baseball.

In 1897, Shay made his first recorded minor league appearances with three teams in the Interstate League and the Ohio-West Virginia League. Statistics are sparse until 1899, when he hit for a .288 batting average in 100 total games for four minor league teams. While playing minor league baseball for the 1900 Youngstown Little Giants, Shay was fined for leaving the team and for using improper language with the team's manager.

Shay made a brief appearance in the major leagues with the Cleveland Blues in 1901. During the 1902 season, he hit a combined .239 in 167 minor-league games. He was arrested in June 1902 after leaving the St. Paul Saints for another team in San Francisco. He was charged with running up an unpaid bill with St. Paul; he was assessed a $25 fine and agreed to repay $138. Shay played in 193 games for the 1903 San Francisco Seals, registering 721 at-bats and a .243 batting average.

== Major league career ==
In late 1903, a baseball column suggested that the Detroit Tigers were interested in Shay, but he was said to be happy playing in California. During Shay's tenure in San Francisco, he got married. Shay went to spring training with the St. Louis Cardinals before the 1904 season. He impressed the team, prompting speculation that shortstop Dave Brain would move to third base and third baseman Jimmy Burke would serve as a utility infielder. Shay played 99 games for the Cardinals in 1904.

Shay sustained an injury to his pinky finger during the 1905 season. The finger did not heal properly and it required amputation. He sat out of major league baseball in 1906, refusing to play in St. Louis. Shay was a successful businessman during his early career; he owned a cigar shop in Stockton, California, purchased an outlaw baseball team and owned several race horses. As Shay prepared to return to baseball after a year away, an article in The Pittsburgh Press said, "There have been many ball players who have quit the game and became wealthy on the turf, but Shay is the only specimen living who was wealthy on the turf and quit the game to play professional baseball."

In December 1906, Shay announced that he was excited about the possibility of playing for the New York Giants. He was making plans to leave the tobacco business so that he could be available to join the team for 1907. Giants manager John McGraw secured Shay's release from St. Louis in January 1907, but he was unable to sign Shay during initial negotiations with him. Shay signed with the team the next month. Reporting on the signing, The New York Times described Shay as "a trustworthy batsman, and a good fielder... a splendid baserunner, cool at all times, and a player of considerable judgment." The article said that Shay was one of three candidates to play second base. He appeared in 35 games for the Giants that season.

== Return to the minor leagues ==
In January 1908, newspaper reports held that Shay would not return to the Giants and that McGraw would meet with him to begin arranging a trade that would send him to another team. That year he played for the Stockton Millers of the California League, an independent minor league. Stockton won the 1908 league championship. During the 1909 season, he became a player-manager for the Kansas City Blues of the American Association.

While Shay was managing at Kansas City in early 1910, American Association president Thomas Chivington imposed new conduct rules for the league. The new system emphasized fines for players and managers rather than simply ejecting them when they behaved poorly. After Shay was ejected from three games in a four-game span, a Minnesota newspaper article questioned whether his behavior would be subject to additional disciplinary action. The next month, Shay released 48-year-old Jake Beckley, prompting his retirement after one of the longest careers in professional baseball history. The first baseman had tried to make the Kansas City team after 20 years in the National League.

In March 1911, Shay was riding in a taxi that collided with a dray and he sustained severe cuts to his face. A newspaper report said that Shay might miss a portion of spring training. Shay was suspended indefinitely in late June 1911 after a fight with an umpire. In October 1911, Shay abruptly resigned as the manager in Kansas City. He declined to say what prompted his resignation and said that he might not be permanently finished with baseball, but he said that he was finished with the Blues. When asked about the possibility of a major league managing job, Shay responded, "There is nothing to be said now, but there may be something later."

When the Columbian Baseball League was forming in 1912, The New York Times named Shay as one of two candidates to manage the league's Kansas City team. The president of the new league, John T. Powers, said that the league would not serve as a third major league, but he noted that many players were eager to sign with the league after their contracts had expired in 1911. The league never materialized. One of its main investors, brewer Otto Stifel, withdrew his support of the league before play began.

== Personal struggles ==
Shay was married with two children. He had managed the 1913 Helena Senators in a minor league known as the Union Association. His wife was killed in a car accident in 1914, and the children were sent to live with other relatives. Shay sat out of baseball that year. In early 1915, newspaper reports held that Shay was headed to Havana to sell real estate; he had apparently grown tired of professional baseball. However, Kansas City Blues manager Bill Armour was promoted to vice president in April 1915, and the team rehired Shay as its manager.

Shay cultivated an image as a brash character. A 1915 article in the Oakland Tribune said he had "more 'pep' than perhaps any other laddie buck who ever wore a spiked shoe." The article recalled an incident from his playing days with Stockton in which he had poked an umpire in the nose; it said that when he left Stockton he had "carried all of his 'pep' with him, and he is almost as well known in the East as he is in and around this section." Late in the 1916 season, Shay was dismissed as manager. He had not been on the bench recently, and his absence was attributed to poor health. Art Phelan had been managing the team on an interim basis and was named as Shay's replacement for the rest of the season.

Signed to manage the Milwaukee Brewers of the American Association in 1917, Shay had a clause in his contract prohibiting him from drinking alcohol, though he was still known to visit bars and order Dubonnet, a liquor that Shay said was "soft as a milk shake." Shay's predecessor in Milwaukee, Harry "Pep" Clark, resigned in the middle of the 1916 season. Clark had led the team to league championships in 1913 and 1914, but he experienced difficulty by the next year when the club's ownership refused to sign new players to replace the aging ones.

== Shooting and trial ==
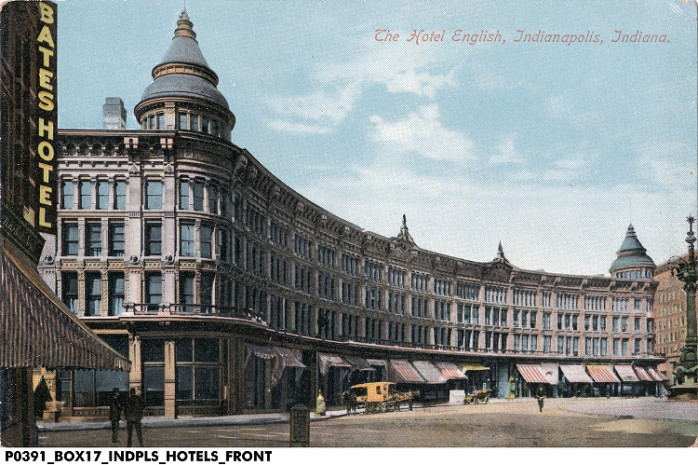
Hotel English in Indianapolis (1909)

On May 3, 1917, the Brewers traveled to Indianapolis and defeated the team there to improve their win–loss record to 7–8. Shay visited a local tavern that night and had some drinks. The tavern owner took Shay to a beauty parlor and introduced him to its owner, Gertrude Anderson. Anderson gave Shay a manicure and accompanied him to the Hotel English. Shay complained to busboy Eugene Jones about the placement of sugar bowls at his table. Clarence Euell, a black waiter at the cafe, came to address Shay's concern. An argument ensued during which Shay pulled out a gun and shot Euell in the abdomen. Euell wrestled Shay onto the floor, pressing his foot down on Shay's head.

Euell was taken to a hospital and died about an hour after the shooting. He was never able to formally identify Shay as the shooter. When Shay was arrested in his hotel room that night, police officers said that he appeared to be intoxicated. He refused to make any statements. He was held without bail and charged with second-degree murder. A conviction carried the possibility of life imprisonment. A few days after the shooting, American Association owners began to collect funds to assist in Shay's criminal defense.

At a coroner's inquest, several witnesses had testified that they saw Shay shoot Euell after an argument over a sugar bowl. Anderson said that she did not see much after the initial verbal exchange because she fled the dining area as soon as the argument escalated. As the case was about to go to trial, one of the attorneys became ill, so the proceedings were delayed for several weeks. The trial was reset for November 12, 1917. By this time, many people in Indiana had grown tired of reading war coverage every day. Seeking a diversion, they filled the courtroom and eagerly read the newspaper accounts of Shay's arrest and trial.

On the witness stand at trial, Anderson said that Shay had two drinks at the cafe. She said that Euell had been staring at her, that he had been rude to them and that he lunged toward Shay before the shooting. The cafe's manager said that Euell had not been rude to Shay, and two waiters denied that Euell had lunged at Shay. A cashier testified that when Shay asked for sugar, Euell pointed out that there was already some on his table but brought two more bowls. She said that Shay called Euell "smarty" and confronted Euell with the gun while the waiter was walking away. Shay denied being drunk and said that Euell hit him and threatened to kill him before the shooting.

Racial discord was prevalent in Indianapolis during this time, so much so that when the Ku Klux Klan was established a few years later, the city served as its nucleus. In this racially charged context, both the prosecution and the defense attempted to use stereotypes to make their cases. The defense suggested that Euell was a dangerous black man full of anger and lust, while the prosecution tried to paint Shay as a red-faced, alcoholic Irishman.

At 11 p.m. on November 21, the case was sent to the jury. At 9:20 a.m. the next day, a not guilty verdict was announced. There was applause in the courtroom when Shay was cleared. An editorial in the local newspaper denounced the verdict the following day. Regarding Shay's self-defense assertion, the editorial said, "The only testimony that even tends to sustain that theory was his own." Black newspapers also criticized the outcome of the case.

"That [the jury] ultimately chose racial defense over social reform should not cloud our ability to see the complexity of the contrasting images that vied for their favor during the course of the trial. Though the trial's outcome was predictable, it was not inevitable," historian David Jones wrote.

== Later life ==
From the time of Shay's arrest through the end of the 1918 season, the Brewers went through four more managers. Shay ended his baseball career as a scout for Columbus of the American Association.

Shay was found dead in a Kansas City hotel room on December 1, 1927. He was found with a gunshot wound to the head. Police officials initially said that the manner of death could have been either suicide or murder. Shay stayed in his room on the day that he died. A porter went to check on him that evening and found him on the floor with a pistol a few inches from his right hand. When physicians examined Shay's body, they found that a bullet had entered the right ear and exited the back of the head. Shay had lost the use of his right arm and hand after a stroke. Police said that if Shay were holding the gun in his left hand, it would not have been easy for him to shoot himself in the right side of the head.

After Shay's death, sportswriter Manning Vaughan described him as a "fire eating, umpire hating player and just as hard when he became a manager." He said that Shay was a "polished gentleman – with his friends. But he was everything else with people he did not like. He would fight at the least provocation, and as it was generally known he packed a gun the gentlemen involved never stuck around very long to argue."
