= Columbia Gardens (amusement park) =

Amusement park in Butte, Montana, US

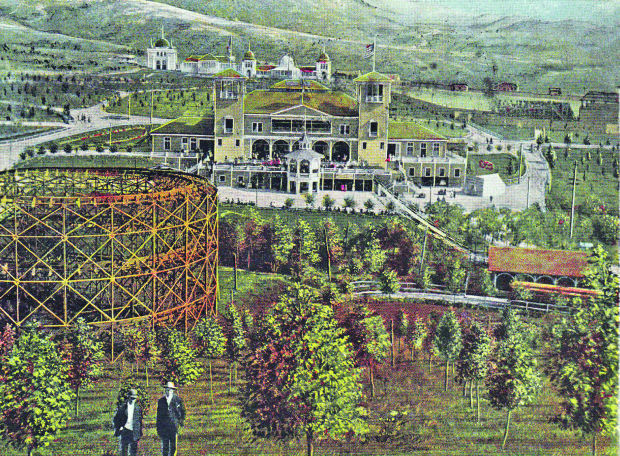
- Columbia Gardens c. 1905
- Interactive map of Columbia Gardens
- Location: Butte, Montana, United States
- Coordinates: 46.0065933°N 112.4641851°W
- Opened: June 4, 1899
- Closed: September 3, 1973
- Owner: Butte Electric Railway Company (1899–1928); Anaconda Copper (1928–1973)
- Operating season: May through October
- Area: 68 acres (28 ha)

Attractions
- Roller coasters: 1

The Columbia Gardens (1899–1973) was an amusement park in Butte, Montana, established by Copper King William A. Clark and later owned and maintained by Anaconda Copper. During its 74 years of operation, it was the only major amusement park in the entire state.

== History ==
The St. Ann Street site that became the Columbia Gardens was actually the second park by that name. The first was established in 1888 by John Gordon and Frederick Ritchie, on land leased from William Adams in the Horse Canyon section of East Butte. The first site did not have sufficient trolley service to make visits worthwhile for every day visitors, and so it was not financially successful. Adams sold out to William A. Clark in March 1899, who was looking for a way to curry favor in an attempt to become a U.S. Senator. He decided on a public park for the benefit of the citizens of Butte. He won election in 1899, but resigned in 1900 when the Senate refused to seat him on account of corruption in his election. He returned to the Senate in 1901 having been duly elected in November 1900.

Clark had Jesse R. Wharton (1857–1923), manager of his Butte Electric Railway Company, scout for a better location near their trolley routes. The location at the east end of St. Ann Street was chosen, and the first 21 acres were purchased (later expanded to 68 by 1925). After relocation and new construction, the new park was opened to the public on June 4, 1899. Clark died in 1925, and his copper holdings and the trolley line (which included the park) were sold to Anaconda Copper in 1928. The park continued to be a tourist attraction for local residents and visitors to the "Richest Hill on Earth", with Anaconda investing more into the park to benefit its workers and lessen the impression it did not care about them or the community.

== Amenities ==
The park had one of the last operational gravity-fed wooden roller coasters (installed 1906), in addition to an airplane ride and a carousel designed by Allan Herschell Company (installed 1928). The original roller coaster was named "Figure 8" from its shape, and was a three level ride; after a 1917 accident, it was reduced to two levels for 1918, and Anaconda changed the layout to a more out-and-back style in 1929. The park included picnic tables and a playground which included special tandem swings that riders tried to "crack" by getting them to their maximum swing distance. They also had a greenhouse where they grew the flowers used in all the custom floral arrangements for the grounds, in such shapes as a butterfly, a harp, and Anaconda's arrowhead logo. Up to the 1930s, they also had a petting zoo and a lake; the lake was turned into a parking lot in 1937. The site also had a baseball park for Butte's earliest amateur and minor league teams (the Butte Miners), and a grand pavilion with arcade which housed the park's concessions and a world-class ballroom, which hosted local proms and many of the Big Band era performers. The park did not charge admission, banking on revenues from the trolley line to the site; Anaconda continued this policy, even after replacing the trolley with bus service in 1937. Children 16 and under rode the trolley/bus to the park free every Thursday, "Children's Day", during the summers from 1903 until the park's final Thursday, August 30, 1973.

== 1973: Closure and fire ==
When Anaconda's copper mines in Chile and Mexico were nationalized in 1971, the company lost most of its revenue sources. The Berkeley Pit was encroaching on the north side of the park, and local residents were wondering how long it would take "the company" to take the park, too. In early 1973, Anaconda announced the park's 1973 season would be the last.

The park closed September 3 (Labor Day), and the usual fall storage for the park rides was accomplished, mostly in the grand pavilion's arcade. Before efforts for relocating the rides to a new site could be fulfilled, the park caught fire and burned down on November 12. The official fire investigation report cited an overloaded electrical transformer, even though power to the site had been shut off two months before. Local residents who knew the way Anaconda conducted its business assume they used the oldest trick in its book when needing to clear land they wanted for mining: arson. The Continental Pit would soon eat up the former park site.

== Legacy ==
In Montana, known as "The Treasure State" for its mineral resources and natural beauty, the stories of the Columbia Gardens would be passed down for generations. The surviving tandem swings were relocated to city parks. The north-south Interstate 15 route between Butte and Helena passes just east of the Continental Pit and the former park site before intersecting with Interstate 90. Although there are temporary amusement rides at the state and county fairs and a few water slide parks, no major amusement park has been attempted in Montana since. When Butte broadcaster and historian Pat Kearney wrote his 1994 book about the park, the publisher's summary described the park as "a treasure more valuable than all the copper, silver and gold taken out of the mines in Butte." The closest comparable amusement park to Montana today is Silverwood Theme Park in Idaho.

The story of the park is the subject of a 1999 documentary film by Montana PBS, Remembering the Columbia Gardens, featuring interviews with Kearney and local residents who visited or worked there. Some of these interviewees were also later featured in the 2008 PBS documentary film Butte, America, which covered the larger legacy of Anaconda Copper in American history.

== The Spirit of Columbia Gardens Carousel ==
The Spirit of Columbia Gardens Carousel is a 501(c)3 non-profit organization that operates in Butte, Montana. Created in 1996, the organization’s main goal was to recreate the carousel destroyed by the Columbia Gardens fire in 1973. The organization reached its goal and the carousel was open for operation July 27th, 2018.

The completed carousel has 32 horses and several low riding carriages. Each completed horse took about 1,000 hours to complete. Most of the labor needed to complete the carousel was donated, as well as the materials.

The Spirit of Columbia Gardens has semiotic relation to the original Columbia gardens. The carousel serves as a reminder of the Columbia Gardens, for the community of Butte to “reclaim, restore, and preserve an important part of Butte’s history.” The meaning of the carousel is as an object, to which it refers to Butte’s history.

== Columbia Gardens Of The Rockies - Legacy Park Foundation ==
The Legacy Park Foundation is a 501(c)3 non-profit organization that operates in Butte, Montana. Created in 2015, the organization’s main goal is to create a new Columbia Gardens on the Continental Divide.
