= Portland Greengages =

- (1903); Portland, Oregon

Minor league affiliations
- Previous classes: Class A
- League: Pacific National League

Major league affiliations
- Previous teams: None

Minor league titles
- League titles: None

Team data
- Previous names: None
- Previous parks: East 8th Street at Hawthorne Avenue

The Portland Greengages were a minor league baseball team based in Portland, Oregon who played in the Class A Pacific National League during the 1903 season. Portland's manager was Jack Grim.

== History ==
At the start of the 1903 season, the Greengages played their home games at a baseball park noted in newspapers as "National Park". According to the city directory, it was on the northeast corner of East 8^{th} Street and Hawthorne Avenue in East Portland. Portland lost their first game 3–2 in 14 innings against the Spokane Indians, on April 14. On April 26 in a game against the Tacoma Tigers two members of the Greengages were fined US$5 for arguing a strike call. The Greengages were losing money according to team president Dr. Emmett Drake. In June it was rumored that the team was going to be relocated to Salt Lake City, Utah, which the team management denied. On July 1, the league officials announced they were transferring the Portland team to Salt Lake City. Several players refused to play out of protest for the team's relocation from Portland. They were ultimately replaced. In Salt Lake City, the team was known as the "Salt Lake City Elders".

== Notable alumni ==
- George Bristow (1903)
- Ira Davis (1903)
- She Donahue (1903)
- Jack Lundbom (1903)
- Tom Parrott (1903)
- Eddie Quick (1903)
- Bill Tozer (1903)
- Farmer Weaver (1903)
- Jimmy Wiggs (1903)
- Portland Green Gages players
