= Pat Kearney (broadcaster) =

American broadcaster

- Born: May 24, 1955; Butte, Montana, US
- Died: October 12, 2014 (aged 59); Butte, Montana, US
- Education: Montana State University, 1978, B.A., Film and television

Patrick J. Kearney (1955–2014) was an American reporter, broadcaster, coach, author and historian, noted for his newscasting, sportscasting and books about his hometown of Butte, Montana.

== Early life ==
Kearney was born in Butte on May 24, 1955, the son of Martin and Louetta (Pene) Kearney. He attended Catholic schools in Butte, and graduated from Butte Central Catholic High School in 1973, where he was a runner on two consecutive state cross country championship teams.

== College and newscasting ==
Kearney attended Montana State University in Bozeman, earning his degree in Film and Television in 1978. After brief stops in Great Falls (KFBB-TV as a reporter in 1979) and Billings (KTVQ-TV as a videographer 1979–1981), he was hired in 1981 as a news reporter at KXLF-TV in Butte, and promoted to news director in 1986. After leaving KXLF in 1988, he became an advertising sales executive for Butte's cable TV companies (the last being Charter Communications) from 1993 until his death.

Kearney's departure from KXLF came on December 7, 1988, when he refused to accept a demotion to sports director, and filed a lawsuit against them for wrongful termination in violation of their written personnel policy. After a split decision in state district court mostly favoring KXLF, and a cross appeal by both parties, the case was decided by the Montana Supreme Court in Kearney's favor, but reducing legal fees granted by the district court to Kearney by $87.90.

== Sportscasting ==
Kearney was a long-time radio broadcaster for Butte Central's football and basketball games, and served as sports historian for both Butte Central and the public Butte High School. He was also instrumental in establishing the Butte Sports Hall of Fame in 1987, to which he was enshrined in 2009. He also coached the cross country team at Butte Central.

== Author, historian and civic involvement ==
Kearney wrote occasional news and sports articles for The Montana Standard up until his death, the final one about the 100th football game between Butte High and Billings Senior High School in 2014.

He was also devoted to recording Butte's history as the Anaconda Copper era ended. His 1983 KXLF news story on the closing of Anaconda's last remaining Butte mining operation (Continental Pit) can be seen in the 2008 PBS documentary film Butte, America.

He wrote seven books about the city and its history; an eighth book dealt with the long-time football rivalry between Montana State and the University of Montana. He was a primary interviewee for the 1999 Montana PBS documentary film Remembering the Columbia Gardens, based partly on his 1994 book Butte's Pride – The Columbia Gardens.

He served as division historian and past president of Division 1 of the Ancient Order of Hibernians.

In addition to founding the Butte Sports Hall of Fame, he established the annual Blarney Stone Run (since renamed in his honor) in 1983, served as co-chairman of Evel Knievel Week and the high school Class C All-Star football game, chairman and founder of the Butte Sports Foundation, co-founder and first-year chairman of the Winternational Sports Festival and manager of the Neversweat & Washoe tourist train in 1989.

He made an unsuccessful run for chief executive of the Butte/Silver Bow government in 2004.

== Death ==
Kearney died from a coronary blockage in his Butte home on October 12, 2014; his body was found two days later.

== Bibliography ==
All titles published by Skyhigh Communications, Butte.

- 1989 – Butte's Big Game
- 1990 – Miracle on the East Ridge (about the Our Lady of the Rockies statue)
- 1994 – Butte's Pride – The Columbia Gardens (about the 1899–1973 amusement park, Montana's only major one)
- 1998 – Butte's Voices: Mining, Neighborhoods, People
- 2001 – Butte’s Copper League
- 2004 – The Divide War: Montana’s Golden Treasure (about the MSU-UM football rivalry)
- 2010 – Butte’s Catholic Family (about Butte's deep Catholic heritage)
- 2014 – Butte's Berkeley Pit
