= Dan Minnehan =

American baseball player (1865–1929)

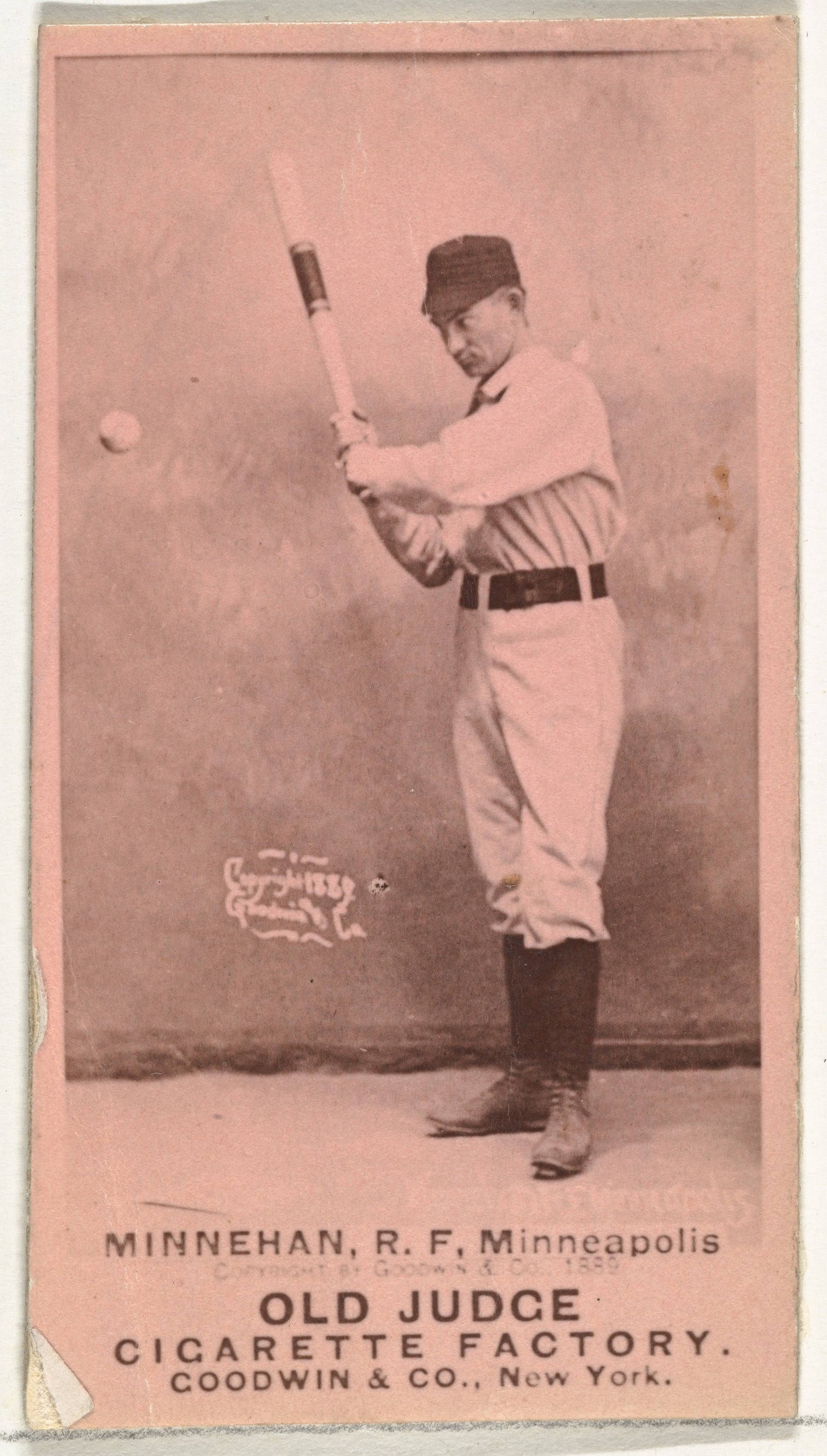
- Third baseman
- Born: November 28, 1865; Troy, New York, U.S.
- Died: August 8, 1929 (aged 63); Troy, New York, U.S.
- Batted: Right Threw: Right

MLB debut
- September 20, 1895, for the Louisville Colonels

Last MLB appearance
- September 29, 1895, for the Louisville Colonels

MLB statistics
- Batting average: .382
- Home runs: 0
- Runs batted in: 6
- Stats at Baseball Reference

Teams
- Louisville Colonels (1895)

Daniel Joseph Minnehan (November 28, 1865 – August 8, 1929) was an American professional baseball player. He played part of one season in Major League Baseball in 1895 as a third baseman for the Louisville Colonels. He played minor league baseball for twelve seasons, from 1888 until 1899.

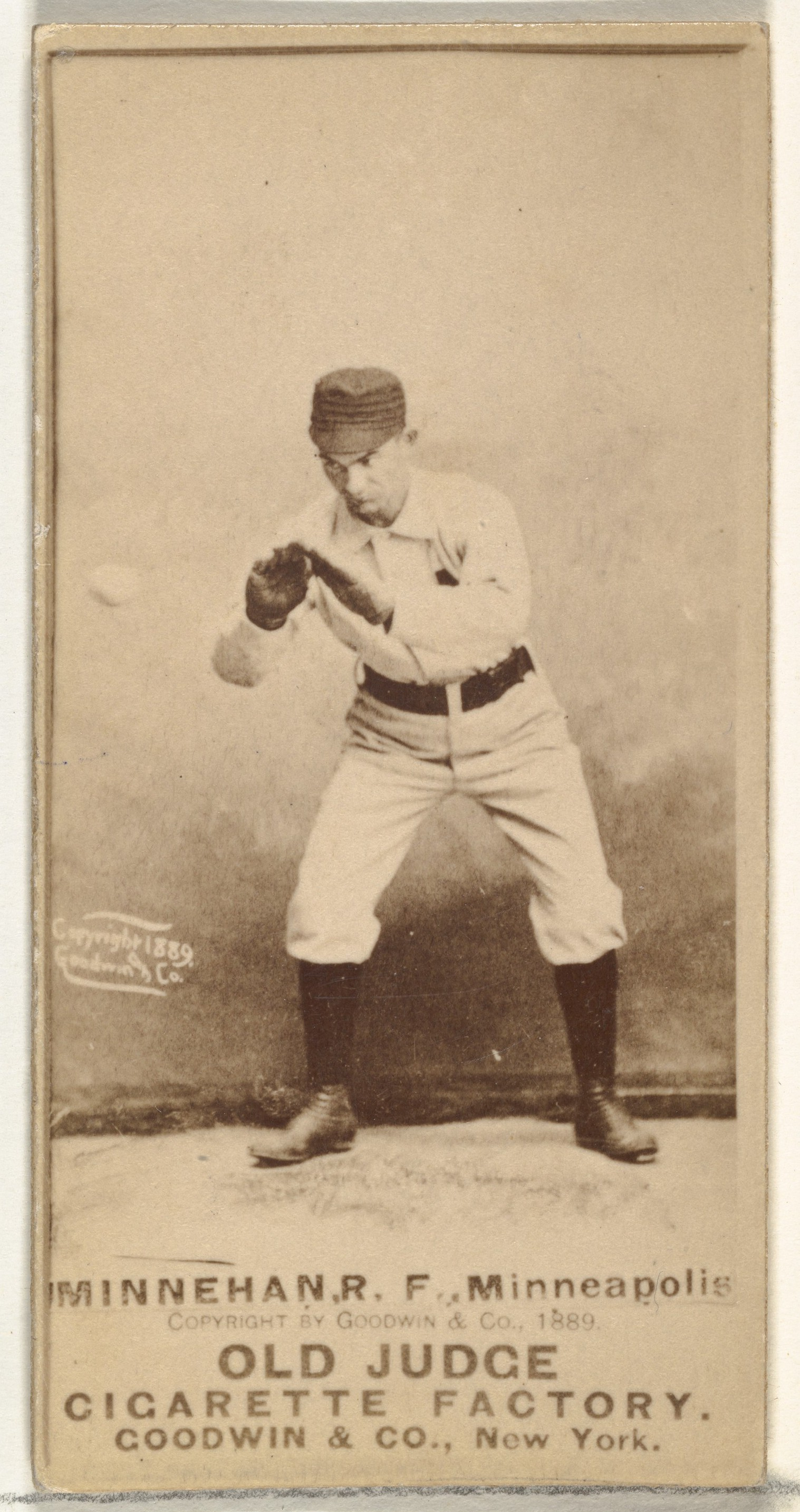

Minnehan was playing for the Syracuse Stars when he was acquired by the Colonels late in the 1895 season to fill in for Jimmy Collins. Minnehan, a 30-year-old rookie, played seven of the last eight games at third base, batting .382, scoring six runs and driving in six. He never played in the Major Leagues again.
