= Ralph Frary =

American baseball player and umpire

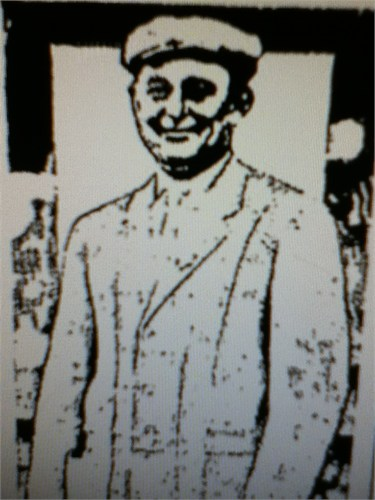
- Born: Ralph Frary; July 3, 1876; Washington, U.S.
- Died: November 9, 1925 (aged 49); Aberdeen, Washington, U.S.
- Occupation: Umpire
- Years active: 1911
- Employer: National League

Ralph Frary (July 3, 1876 – November 9, 1925) was an American professional baseball player and umpire. From 1895 to 1906, Frary played in the minor leagues with several teams as a catcher, outfielder, and first baseman. Frary umpired 17 National League games in 1911, eight of them as the home plate umpire.

== Playing career ==
Frary played catcher and first base with Montana, Spokane and Seattle of the Pacific Coast League and Pacific National League. He signed with Nashville of the Southern League in 1906, having had "trouble at Seattle."

== Umpiring career ==
In 1908, Frary umpired in the Northwestern League. That July, it was reported as "practically settled" that Frary would be promoted to the major leagues the following year. The next month, Frary made headlines when President Charley Wolf of the Spokane club accused him of being crooked and connected to gamblers. Frary demanded that the National Board of Minor Leagues either expel Frary or Wolf. In September, Aberdeen manager Bob Brown accused Frary of drunkenness on the field. Frary remained in the Northwestern League through the 1910 season, after which he stated that he would not return to the league without a generous boost in pay.

In June 1911, Frary was promoted to the National League umpiring staff. In his debut, Frary was the base umpire for a Christy Mathewson shutout against the Boston Rustlers. In July, Frary took a foul ball to the leg and blood poisoning developed. Frary was able to return to the field briefly in mid-August, but he came home within a few games when he was bothered by leg trouble again. He umpired his last NL game on August 14, 1911. Contrary to initial reports, Frary was not ultimately retained by the NL for the next season. Despite speculation that he might open a book at a local racetrack, he umpired in the Union Association in 1912 and 1913.

In May 1914, Frary abruptly departed for a three-year contract in the Federal League. By 1915, however, Frary was back in the Northwestern League. In 1918, Frary ejected Salt Lake City pitcher Clarence "Popboy" Smith after an argument about which ball should be in play. After being tossed, Smith struck Frary with a punch that broke the umpire's nose. The pitcher received a suspension and $250 fine. Before the 1920 season, Frary and two other umpires were fired from the Pacific Coast League staff by new league president William H. McCarthy.

== Personal life ==
Frary ran The Mecca, a Spokane saloon that served as a hangout for popular figures such as a young Jack Dempsey. The saloon was ordered closed in 1911 for harboring unsavory characters and selling liquor on Sundays. During the investigation of the saloon, Frary's wife was involved in a police chase. Mrs. Frary was wanted to testify before the commissioner's court, but she hurriedly jumped into a taxi to evade officers. Though the police car had mechanical problems, officers caught up to the cab and took Mrs. Frary into custody.

== Death ==
Frary died in Aberdeen, Washington in November 1925.
