= Ike Rockenfield =

American baseball player (1876–1927)

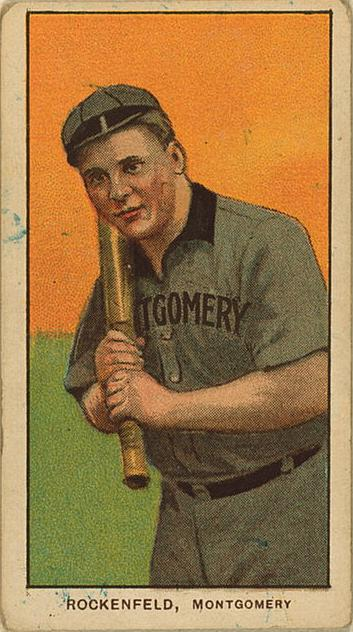
- Second baseman
- Born: November 3, 1876; Omaha, Nebraska, U.S.
- Died: February 21, 1927 (aged 50); San Diego, California, U.S.
- Batted: Right Threw: Right

MLB debut
- May 5, 1905, for the St. Louis Browns

Last MLB appearance
- October 7, 1906, for the St. Louis Browns

MLB statistics
- Batting average: .221
- Home runs: 0
- Runs batted in: 24
- Stats at Baseball Reference

Teams
- St. Louis Browns (1905–1906)

Isaac Broc Rockenfield (November 3, 1876 – February 21, 1927) was an American second baseman in Major League Baseball. He played for the St. Louis Browns.
