= Pat Hannivan =

Canadian baseball player (1866–1908)

- Outfielder/Second baseman
- Born: April 20, 1866; Halifax, Nova Scotia, Canada
- Died: November 5, 1908 (aged 42); Springfield, Massachusetts, U.S.
- Batted: Unknown Threw: Left

MLB debut
- April 29, 1897, for the Brooklyn Bridegrooms

Last MLB appearance
- October 2, 1897, for the Brooklyn Bridegrooms

MLB statistics
- Batting average: .250
- Home runs: 0
- Runs batted in: 2
- Stats at Baseball Reference

Teams
- Brooklyn Bridegrooms (1897)

Patrick James Hannivan (April 20, 1866 – November 5, 1908) was a Canadian professional baseball player. He played part of the 1897 season in Major League Baseball for the Brooklyn Bridegrooms. He appeared in three games as an outfielder and two games as a second baseman.

Hannivan was active in minor league baseball through the 1908 season. That offseason, he was expected to begin a job in Connecticut with the Underwood Typewriter Company but died suddenly.
