= Joe Marshall =

American baseball player (1876–1931)

- Outfielder
- Born: February 19, 1876; Audubon, Minnesota, U.S.
- Died: September 11, 1931 (aged 55); Santa Monica, California, U.S.
- Batted: Right Threw: Right

MLB debut
- September 7, 1903, for the Pittsburgh Pirates

Last MLB appearance
- August 17, 1906, for the St. Louis Cardinals

MLB statistics
- Batting average: .178
- Home runs: 0
- Runs batted in: 9
- Stats at Baseball Reference

Teams
- Pittsburgh Pirates (1903); St. Louis Cardinals (1906)

Joseph Hanley Marshall (February 19, 1876 – September 11, 1931), nicknamed "Home Run Joe", was an American outfielder in Major League Baseball for the Pittsburgh Pirates and St. Louis Cardinals. He also played 12 years in the minor leagues. Marshall stood at 5 ft 8 in (1.73 m) and weighed 170 lbs.

== Career ==
Joseph Marshall was born in Audubon, Minnesota. He started his professional baseball career in 1897, in the Red River Valley League. He played on the Montana State League's Helena Senators in early 1900 but was then traded to the Great Falls Indians for one player and US$200. The player he was traded for was future Hall of Famer Joe Tinker. The following season, Marshall went to the Spokane Blue Stockings of the Pacific Northwest League. He was a shortstop for the only time in his career and fielded at a .848 clip, but he also batted .291 and slugged 15 home runs. In 1902, he raised his batting average to .309 but hit just 6 homers.

1903 was Marshall's big year. Playing for the San Francisco Pirates of the Pacific National League, he batted .343 with a league-leading 25 home runs. The home run total was more than double of any other player in the league. He also led the circuit in slugging percentage (.601) and total bases (282) and was the overall "minor league slugging champion" that year.

Marshall was acquired by the Pittsburgh Pirates towards the end of the season, and he made his major league debut on September 7. In 10 games, he went 6 for 23 (.261) with 2 runs batted in. The Pirates won the National League pennant and faced the Boston Americans in the 1903 World Series. Marshall was in the teams' dugout during the series but did not play, and the Pirates lost in eight games.

Marshall returned to the Pacific National League in 1904 and hit .345. His 10 homers ranked second overall. He then played for the Northwestern League's Vancouver Veterans in 1905. By this time, he was being referred to as "Home Run Joe Marshall" by Sporting Life. He hit .298 with a league-leading 7 home runs that season (again more than double the total of any other player). However, he quit the team in late August, saying that he was "done with base ball."

The following season, Marshall was back in baseball, this time with the St. Louis Cardinals. He played in 33 games and batted .158 with 0 home runs and 2 RBI. His final major league appearance was on August 17, 1906. In 1907, Marshall returned to the Pacific Northwest League but batted just .197 in 17 games. In 1909, he moved down to the Class D Inter-Mountain League and hit .231.

Marshall then spent 1911 through 1913 with the Union Association's Butte Miners. He had his last good season in 1911, when he batted .320 and finished second in the league in both home runs (12) and slugging percentage (.548). After hitting .275 in 1913, he retired from professional baseball. Overall, Marshall collected 991 hits, including 79 homers, in 825 career minor league games. He played in 43 major league games and did not hit a single home run.

Marshall died in 1931 in Santa Monica, California. He was buried in Rosedale Cemetery.
