= Walt Wilmot =

American baseball player (1863–1929)

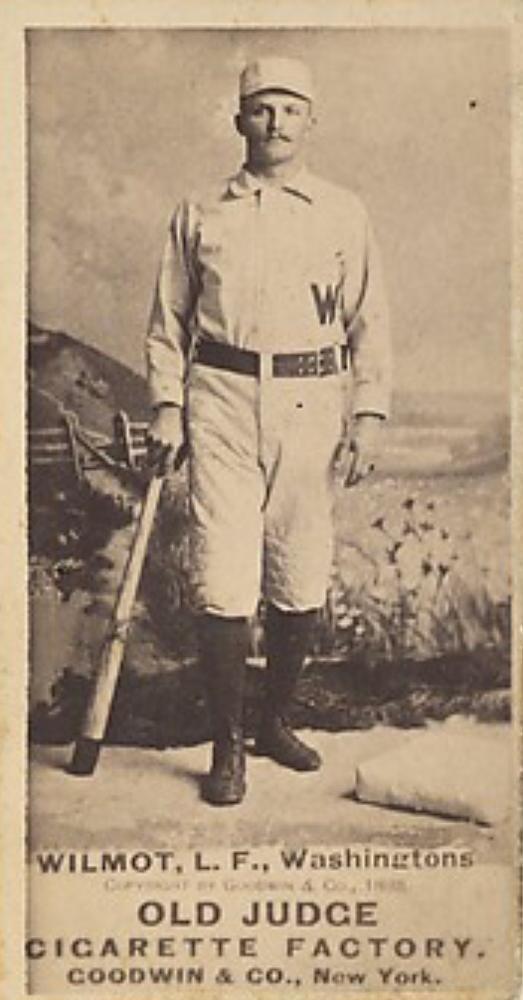
- Outfielder
- Born: October 18, 1865; Plover, Wisconsin, U.S.
- Died: February 1, 1929 (aged 65); Chicago, Illinois, U.S.
- Batted: Switch Threw: Right

MLB debut
- April 20, 1888, for the Washington Nationals

Last MLB appearance
- June 14, 1898, for the New York Giants

MLB statistics
- Batting average: .276
- Home runs: 58
- Runs batted in: 594
- Stolen bases: 383
- Stats at Baseball Reference

Teams
- Washington Nationals (1888–1889); Chicago Colts (1890–1895); New York Giants (1897–1898)

Career highlights and awards
- NL home run leader (1890)

Walter Robert Wilmot (October 18, 1863 – February 1, 1929) was an American professional baseball player. He played all or parts of 10 seasons in Major League Baseball for the Washington Nationals (1888–89), Chicago Colts (1890–95), and New York Giants (1897–98), primarily as an outfielder. Listed at 5 ft 9 in, 165 lb., Wilmot was a switch-hitter and threw right-handed. He was born in Plover, Wisconsin.

While playing for the Nationals in 1889, Wilmot led the league with 19 triples. The following season, he tied with Oyster Burns and Mike Tiernan for the National League lead in home runs with 13, also a career-high. Wilmot also had 76 stolen bases and 99 RBI in 1890. On August 22, 1891, he became the first player in major league history to be walked six times in one game.

In 1894, Wilmot posted career-highs in batting average (.329), hits (199), doubles (45), extra-base hits (62), runs scored (136), and RBI (130) in 135 games.

Overall, in his 10-year career, Wilmot was a .276 hitter with 58 home runs and 594 RBI in 962 games, including 727 runs, 152 doubles, 92 triples, 383 stolen bases, and a .337 on-base percentage.

Wilmot died in Chicago at the age of 65.

== See also ==
- List of Major League Baseball annual home run leaders
- List of Major League Baseball annual triples leaders
- List of Major League Baseball career stolen bases leaders
