= Solly Salisbury =

American baseball player

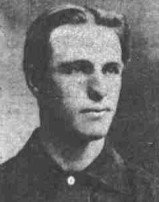
- Pitcher
- Born: November 12, 1876; Algona, Iowa, U.S.
- Died: January 17, 1952 (aged 75); Rowena, Oregon, U.S.
- Batted: Right Threw: Right

MLB debut
- April 19, 1902, for the Philadelphia Phillies

Last MLB appearance
- April 24, 1902, for the Philadelphia Phillies

MLB statistics
- Games pitched: 2
- Earned run average: 13.50
- Strikeouts: 0
- Stats at Baseball Reference

Teams
- Philadelphia Phillies (1902)

William Ansel Salisbury (November 12, 1876 – January 17, 1952), commonly known as Solly Salisbury, was an American Major League Baseball pitcher who played in 1902 with the Philadelphia Phillies. He batted and threw right-handed.

Salisbury had a 0–0 record, with a 13.50 earned run average, in two games, in his one-year career.
