= Eddie Quick =

American baseball player (1881-1913)

- Pitcher
- Born: December 1881; Baltimore, Maryland, U.S.
- Died: June 19, 1913 (aged 31); Rocky Ford, Colorado, U.S.
- Batted: Unknown Threw: Right

MLB debut
- September 28, 1903, for the New York Highlanders

Last MLB appearance
- September 28, 1903, for the New York Highlanders

MLB statistics
- Win–loss record: 0–0
- Earned run average: 9.00
- Strikeouts: 0
- Stats at Baseball Reference

Teams
- New York Highlanders (1903)

Edwin S. Quick (December 1881 - June 19, 1913) was an American Major League Baseball pitcher who played in 1903 with the New York Highlanders. He threw right-handed.

Quick started his professional baseball career in 1902 in the Pacific Northwest League. Late in the following season, he made one appearance for the Highlanders; he pitched two innings and gave up five runs. In January 1904, he was traded to Toledo. He went 18-18 for the Western League's Omaha Rourkes in 1905. Quick finished his career pitching in the Pacific Coast League in 1907 and 1908.

Quick was born in Baltimore, Maryland. He died in Rocky Ford, Colorado in 1913, of pneumonia.
