= Bill Tozer =

American baseball player (1882–1955)

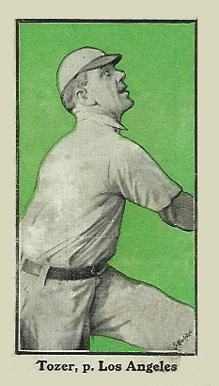
- Pitcher
- Born: July 3, 1882; St. Louis, Missouri
- Died: February 23, 1955 (aged 72); Belmont, California
- Batted: Right Threw: Right

MLB debut
- April 16, 1908, for the Cincinnati Reds

Last MLB appearance
- May 10, 1908, for the Cincinnati Reds

MLB statistics
- Win–loss record: 0–0
- Earned run average: 1.69
- Strikeouts: 5
- Stats at Baseball Reference

Teams
- Cincinnati Reds (1908)

William Louis Tozer (July 3, 1882 – February 23, 1955), was a Major League Baseball pitcher who played in 1908 with the Cincinnati Reds. He batted and threw right-handed. Tozer had a 0–0 record, with a 1.69 ERA, in four games, in his one-year career.

He was born in St. Louis, Missouri and died in Belmont, California. He was interred at Cypress Lawn Memorial Park.
