= Charlie Reilly (baseball) =

American baseball player (1867–1937)

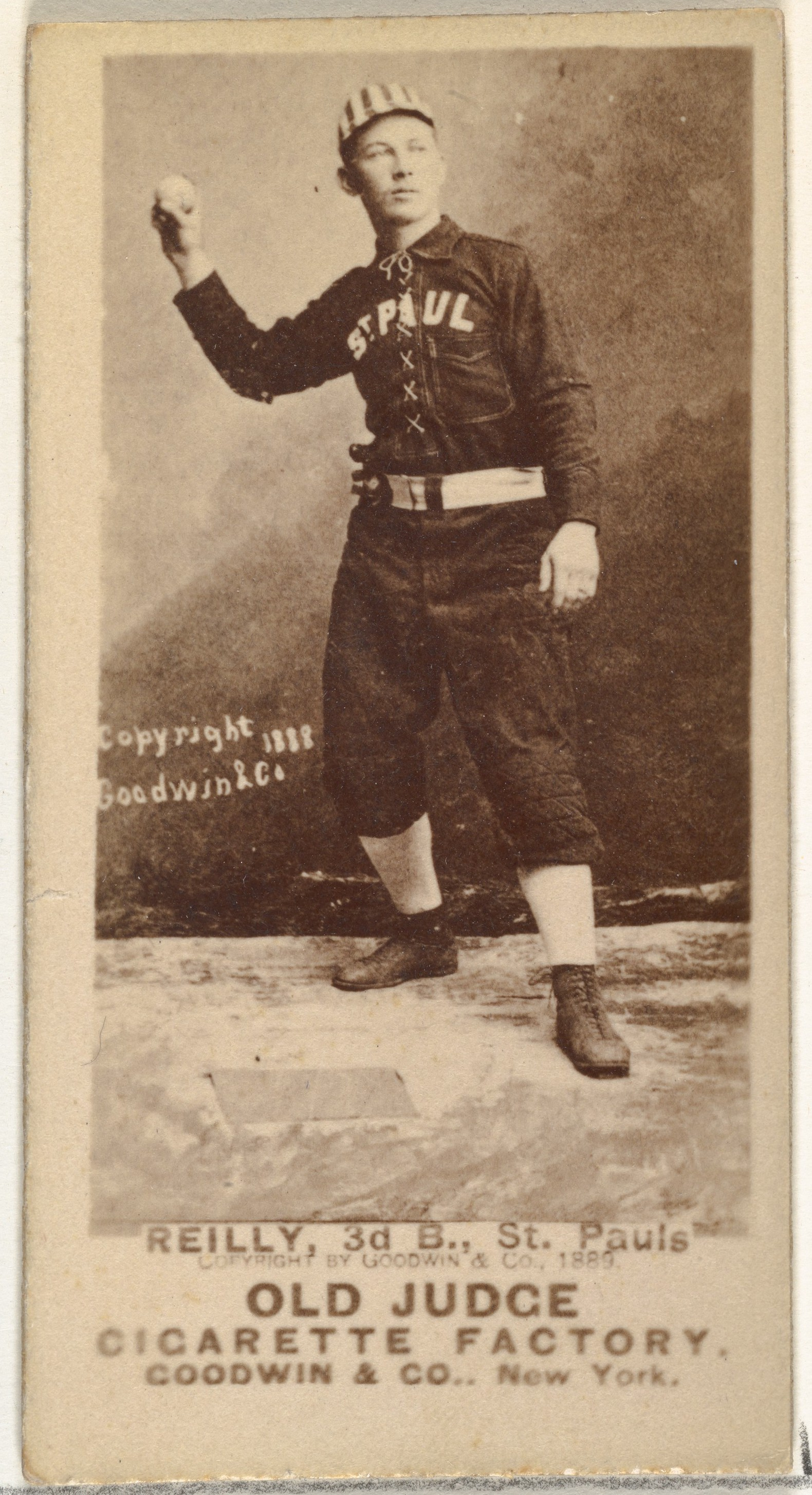
- Third baseman
- Born: February 15, 1867; Princeton, New Jersey, U.S.
- Died: December 16, 1937 (aged 70); Los Angeles, California, U.S.
- Batted: Switch Threw: Right

MLB debut
- October 9, 1889, for the Columbus Solons

Last MLB appearance
- September 27, 1897, for the Washington Senators

MLB statistics
- Batting average: .250
- Home runs: 17
- Runs batted in: 311
- Stats at Baseball Reference

Teams
- Columbus Solons (1889–1890); Pittsburgh Pirates (1891); Philadelphia Phillies (1892–1895); Washington Senators (1897)

Charles Thomas Reilly (February 15, 1867 – December 16, 1937) was an American professional baseball infielder. He played in Major League Baseball (MLB) from 1889 to 1897 for the Columbus Solons, Pittsburgh Pirates, Philadelphia Phillies, and Washington Senators.

Reilly was the first of two players to have four hits that included at least one home run (he hit two) in their first major league game. J. P. Arencibia is the only player in the baseball's modern era to equal this feat. Trevor Story of the Colorado Rockies also hit two home runs in his first ever Major League game (and a third home run in his second game), while Bob Nieman, Bert Campaneris, Mark Quinn, and Trevor Story have all also hit two home runs in their first ever MLB game.

In 1894, six of the National League baseball clubs organized the American League of Professional Football Clubs, a professional soccer league. Reilly played half back for Philadelphia and was a favorite of the home crowd in the inaugural game played at Philadelphia Ball Park on October 6, 1894.
