= Ira Davis (baseball) =

American baseball player (1870–1942)

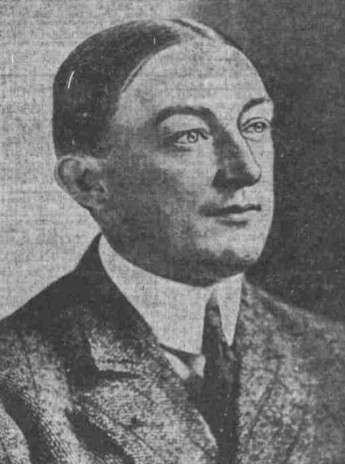
- Shortstop / First baseman
- Born: July 8, 1870; Philadelphia. Pennsylvania, U.S.
- Died: December 21, 1942 (aged 72); Brooklyn, New York, U.S.
- Batted: Unknown Threw: Right

MLB debut
- April 22, 1899, for the New York Giants

Last MLB appearance
- May 3, 1899, for the New York Giants

MLB statistics
- Batting average: .235
- Home runs: 0
- Runs batted in: 2
- Stats at Baseball Reference

Teams
- New York Giants (1899)

J. Ira Davis (July 8, 1870 – December 21, 1942) was an American infielder in Major League Baseball. He went to the University of Pennsylvania and played for the New York Giants in 1899. He remained active in the minor leagues through 1908.
