= Butte, America =

- North American release poster
- Directed by: Pamela Roberts
- Written by: Eugene Corr; Edwin Dobb
- Produced by: Pamela Roberts; Jane Greenberg
- Narrated by: Gabriel Byrne
- Cinematography: Erik Daarstad
- Edited by: Jennifer Chinlund
- Music by: Todd Boekelheide
- Production companies: Rattlesnake Productions, Inc.
- Release date: January 17, 2008
- Running time: 67 minutes
- Country: United States
- Language: English

Butte, America is a 2008 documentary film about Butte, Montana's history as a copper mining town. It was created by Pamela Roberts, narrated by Gabriel Byrne, and includes a mix of first hand accounts and scholarly analysis from John T. Shea, Marie Cassidy, David Emmons, and Janet Finn. The movie focuses on developments in American labor and production during the dawn of the electrical age in the 1880s when copper was discovered in Butte. The mining activity brought an influx of immigrant workers and their families to the boom town that grew to be a Western metropolis of 45,000 people forming a Rocky Mountain city that with similarities to Pittsburgh in the East. Labor relations and the corporate operations of Anaconda Copper are also related.

The film aired on the Independent Lens PBS show on October 20, 2009.
