= Russ Hall =

American baseball player (1871–1937)

- Shortstop
- Born: September 29, 1871; Shelbyville, Kentucky, U.S.
- Died: July 1, 1937 (aged 65); Los Angeles, California, U.S.
- Batted: Left Threw: Left

MLB debut
- April 15, 1898, for the St. Louis Browns

Last MLB appearance
- July 16, 1901, for the Cleveland Blues

MLB statistics
- Batting average: .252
- Home runs: 0
- Runs batted in: 10
- Stats at Baseball Reference

Teams
- St. Louis Browns (1898); Cleveland Blues (1901)

Robert Russell Hall (September 29, 1871 – July 1, 1937) was an American Major League Baseball shortstop who played for two seasons. He played for the St. Louis Browns in 1897 and the Cleveland Blues in 1901.
