= Jimmy Wiggs =

American baseball player (1876–1963)

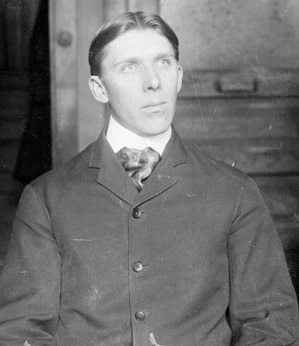
- Pitcher
- Born: September 1, 1876; Trondheim, Sweden-Norway
- Died: January 20, 1963 (aged 86); Xenia, Ohio, U.S.
- Batted: Switch Threw: Right

MLB debut
- April 23, 1903, for the Cincinnati Reds

Last MLB appearance
- May 25, 1906, for the Detroit Tigers

MLB statistics
- Win–loss record: 3–4
- Strikeouts: 46
- Earned run average: 3.81
- Stats at Baseball Reference

Teams
- Cincinnati Reds (1903); Detroit Tigers (1905–1906)

James Alvin Wiggs (September 1, 1876 – January 20, 1963), nicknamed "Big Jim", was a right-handed pitcher in Major League Baseball for the Cincinnati Reds (1903) and Detroit Tigers (1905–06).

Born in Trondheim, Norway in 1876, Wiggs is one of three Norwegian major league baseball players in history. Wiggs was a big man at 6'4" tall.

In April 1903, Wiggs made his major league debut at age 26 with the Cincinnati Reds. He appeared in only two games for the Reds, pitching in only 5 innings with a 5.40 ERA.

In 1905, Wiggs got a second chance in the majors with the Detroit Tigers. He pitched in 11 games for the Tigers in the 1905 and 1906 seasons. In 1905, Wiggs pitched 41 1/3 innings (including 4 complete games) with a 3.27 earned run average (ERA) and a 3–3 record.

According to records of long-term holdouts by major league baseball players, Wiggs became the first player (in 1905) to hold out for at least of month of the season.

In 1906, Wiggs pitched in only 10-1/3 innings and saw his ERA jump to 5.23—two points higher than the previous season. Wiggs pitched his final game for the Tigers on May 25, 1903, and did not play another game in the major leagues.

After being cut by the Tigers, Wiggs played for the Toledo Mud Hens in 1906.

In 1909, Wiggs pitched for the Oakland Oaks in the Pacific Coast League, and appeared in the longest shutout in professional baseball history, a 24-inning 1–0 loss to the San Francisco Seals. In what was called "the greatest game ever seen west of the Rockies," Wiggs struck out 11 batters, and held the Seals scoreless through 23 innings, but lost the 3-hour, 35-minute game when the Oaks allowed an unearned run in the 24th inning. Cack Henley pitched the complete game shutout for the Seals. ("Runs, Hits, and an Era: The Pacific Coast League, 1903-58," By Paul J Zingg)

Jimmy Wiggs died in Xenia, Ohio in 1963 at age 86.
