= 1898 Washington Senators season =

1898 Washington Senators
- League: National League
- Ballpark: Boundary Field
- City: Washington, D.C.
- Record: 51–101 (.336)
- League place: 11th
- Owners: J. Earl Wagner
- Managers: Tom Brown, Jack Doyle, Deacon McGuire, Arthur Irwin

The 1898 Washington Senators season was a season in American baseball. The team finished the season with a 51–101 record, eleventh place in the National League.

== Regular season ==
=== Season standings ===
National League
Team	W	L	Pct.	GB	Home	Road
Boston Beaneaters	102	47	.685	—	62‍–‍15	40‍–‍32
Baltimore Orioles	96	53	.644	6	58‍–‍15	38‍–‍38
Cincinnati Reds	92	60	.605	11½	58‍–‍28	34‍–‍32
Chicago Orphans	85	65	.567	17½	58‍–‍31	27‍–‍34
Cleveland Spiders	81	68	.544	21	36‍–‍19	45‍–‍49
Philadelphia Phillies	78	71	.523	24	49‍–‍31	29‍–‍40
New York Giants	77	73	.513	25½	45‍–‍28	32‍–‍45
Pittsburgh Pirates	72	76	.486	29½	39‍–‍35	33‍–‍41
Louisville Colonels	70	81	.464	33	43‍–‍34	27‍–‍47
Brooklyn Bridegrooms	54	91	.372	46	30‍–‍41	24‍–‍50
Washington Senators	51	101	.336	52½	34‍–‍44	17‍–‍57
St. Louis Browns	39	111	.260	63½	20‍–‍44	19‍–‍67

=== Record vs. opponents ===
1898 National League record Sources:
Team	BAL	BSN	BRO	CHI	CIN	CLE	LOU	NYG	PHI	PIT	STL	WAS
Baltimore	—	5–7	8–5–1	9–5	8–6–1	8–6–1	9–5	10–3–1	10–3–1	10–4	12–2	7–7
Boston	7–5	—	11–2	9–5	9–4–1	6–7–1	8–6–1	10–4	10–4	9–5	12–2	11–3
Brooklyn	5–8–1	2–11	—	4–10	3–11	6–7	2–10–1	3–11	6–6	9–5–1	7–6–1	7–6
Chicago	5–9	5–9	10–4	—	6–8	7–7	9–5	9–5–1	6–7	7–4–1	10–4	11–3
Cincinnati	6–8–1	4–9–1	11–3	8–6	—	8–5–2	9–5	6–8–1	7–7	12–2	12–2	9–5
Cleveland	6–8–1	7–6–1	7–6	7–7	5–8–2	—	9–5	6–8	7–7	5–8	10–3–1	12–2–2
Louisville	5–9	6–8–1	10–2–1	5–9	5–9	5–9	—	6–8	4–10	4–9–1	10–4	10–4
New York	3–10–1	4–10	11–3	5–9–1	8–6–1	8–6	8–6	—	6–7	5–9–1	10–3–2	9–4–1
Philadelphia	3–10–1	4–10	6–6	7–6	7–7	7–7	10–4	7–6	—	6–8	9–5	12–2
Pittsburgh	4–10	5–9	5–9–1	4–7–1	2–12	8–5	9–4–1	9–5–1	8–6	—	9–4	9–5
St. Louis	2–12	2–12	6–7–1	4–10	2–12	3–10–1	4–10	3–10–2	5–9	4–9	—	4–10
Washington	7–7	3–11	6–7	3–11	5–9	2–12–2	4–10	4–9–1	2–12	5–9	10–4	—

=== Roster ===
1898 Washington Senators
Roster
Pitchers: Doc Amole; Kirtley Baker; Bill Dinneen; Roy Evans; Frank Killen; Win Mercer; Jack Sutthoff; Cy Swaim; Charlie Weber; Gus Weyhing; Pop Williams	Catchers: Duke Farrell; Tom Kinslow; Deacon McGuire; Infielders: Charlie Carr; Doc Casey; Harry Davis; Jack Doyle; Jim Field; Frank Gatins; Ed Glenn; Tom Leahy; Bert Myers; Heinie Reitz; Jud Smith; Butts Wagner; Zeke Wrigley	Outfielders: John Anderson; Tom Brown; Bill Donovan; Bill Eagle; Buck Freeman; Jake Gettman; Jack Gilbert; Bob McHale; Mart McQuaid; Kip Selbach	Manager: Tom Brown; Jack Doyle; Deacon McGuire; Arthur Irwin

== Player stats ==
=== Batting ===
==== Starters by position ====
Note: Pos = Position; G = Games played; AB = At bats; H = Hits; Avg. = Batting average; HR = Home runs; RBI = Runs batted in

Pos	Player	G	AB	H	Avg.	HR	RBI
C	Deacon McGuire	131	489	131	.268	1	57
1B	Jack Doyle	43	177	54	.305	2	26
2B	Heinie Reitz	132	489	148	.303	2	47
SS	Zeke Wrigley	111	400	98	.245	2	39
3B	Jud Smith	66	234	71	.303	3	28
OF	John Anderson	110	430	131	.305	9	71
OF	Kip Selbach	132	515	156	.303	3	60
OF	Jake Gettman	142	567	157	.277	5	47

==== Other batters ====
Note: G = Games played; AB = At bats; H = Hits; Avg. = Batting average; HR = Home runs; RBI = Runs batted in

Player	G	AB	H	Avg.	HR	RBI
Duke Farrell	99	338	106	.314	1	53
Butts Wagner	63	223	50	.224	1	31
Doc Casey	28	112	31	.277	0	15
Bert Myers	31	110	29	.264	0	13
Buck Freeman	29	107	39	.364	3	21
Bill Donovan	39	103	17	.165	2	8
Charlie Carr	20	73	14	.192	0	4
Frank Gatins	17	58	13	.224	0	5
Tom Leahy	15	55	10	.182	0	5
Tom Brown	16	55	9	.164	0	2
Bob McHale	11	33	6	.182	0	7
Jim Field	5	21	2	.095	0	0
Bill Eagle	4	13	4	.308	0	2
Tom Kinslow	3	9	1	.111	0	0
Jack Gilbert	2	5	1	.200	0	1
Ed Glenn	1	4	0	.000	0	0
Mart McQuaid	1	4	0	.000	0	0
Harry Davis	1	3	0	.000	0	0

=== Pitching ===
==== Starting pitchers ====
Note: G = Games pitched; IP = Innings pitched; W = Wins; L = Losses; ERA = Earned run average; SO = Strikeouts

Player	G	IP	W	L	ERA	SO
Gus Weyhing	45	361.0	15	26	4.51	92
Win Mercer	33	233.2	12	18	4.82	52
Bill Dinneen	29	218.1	9	16	4.00	83
Frank Killen	17	128.1	6	9	3.58	43
Cy Swaim	16	101.1	3	11	4.26	30
Roy Evans	7	50.2	3	3	3.38	11
Kirtley Baker	6	47.0	2	3	3.06	7
Pop Williams	2	17.0	0	2	8.47	3
Charlie Weber	1	4.0	0	1	15.75	0

==== Other pitchers ====
Note: G = Games pitched; IP = Innings pitched; W = Wins; L = Losses; ERA = Earned run average; SO = Strikeouts

Player	G	IP	W	L	ERA	SO
Bill Donovan	17	88.0	1	6	4.30	36
Doc Amole	7	49.1	0	6	7.84	11
Jack Sutthoff	2	8.1	0	0	12.96	3
