= 1898 St. Louis Browns season =

Major League Baseball season

1898 St. Louis Browns
- League: National League
- Ballpark: New Sportsman's Park
- City: St. Louis, Missouri
- Record: 39–111 (.260)
- League place: 12th
- Owners: Chris von der Ahe
- Managers: Tim Hurst
- Stats: ESPN.com; Baseball Reference

The 1898 St. Louis Browns season was the team's 17th season in St. Louis, Missouri and the seventh season in the National League. The Browns went 39–111 during the season and finished 12th in the National League.

Chris von der Ahe, who had owned the team since its inception in 1882, was forced into court due to his mounting debts related to owning the Browns. Von der Ahe lost the team in the trial and it was bought by brothers Stanley and Frank Robison after the 1898 season. The Robisons, who were also owners of the Cleveland Spiders, first renamed the team the "Perfectos" in 1899, and transferred all of the Spiders' best players to the team. Eventually, the team's colors were changed to red, and nickname to the Cardinals.

== Regular season ==
=== Season standings ===
National League
Team	W	L	Pct.	GB	Home	Road
Boston Beaneaters	102	47	.685	—	62‍–‍15	40‍–‍32
Baltimore Orioles	96	53	.644	6	58‍–‍15	38‍–‍38
Cincinnati Reds	92	60	.605	11½	58‍–‍28	34‍–‍32
Chicago Orphans	85	65	.567	17½	58‍–‍31	27‍–‍34
Cleveland Spiders	81	68	.544	21	36‍–‍19	45‍–‍49
Philadelphia Phillies	78	71	.523	24	49‍–‍31	29‍–‍40
New York Giants	77	73	.513	25½	45‍–‍28	32‍–‍45
Pittsburgh Pirates	72	76	.486	29½	39‍–‍35	33‍–‍41
Louisville Colonels	70	81	.464	33	43‍–‍34	27‍–‍47
Brooklyn Bridegrooms	54	91	.372	46	30‍–‍41	24‍–‍50
Washington Senators	51	101	.336	52½	34‍–‍44	17‍–‍57
St. Louis Browns	39	111	.260	63½	20‍–‍44	19‍–‍67

=== Record vs. opponents ===
1898 National League record Sources:
Team	BAL	BSN	BRO	CHI	CIN	CLE	LOU	NYG	PHI	PIT	STL	WAS
Baltimore	—	5–7	8–5–1	9–5	8–6–1	8–6–1	9–5	10–3–1	10–3–1	10–4	12–2	7–7
Boston	7–5	—	11–2	9–5	9–4–1	6–7–1	8–6–1	10–4	10–4	9–5	12–2	11–3
Brooklyn	5–8–1	2–11	—	4–10	3–11	6–7	2–10–1	3–11	6–6	9–5–1	7–6–1	7–6
Chicago	5–9	5–9	10–4	—	6–8	7–7	9–5	9–5–1	6–7	7–4–1	10–4	11–3
Cincinnati	6–8–1	4–9–1	11–3	8–6	—	8–5–2	9–5	6–8–1	7–7	12–2	12–2	9–5
Cleveland	6–8–1	7–6–1	7–6	7–7	5–8–2	—	9–5	6–8	7–7	5–8	10–3–1	12–2–2
Louisville	5–9	6–8–1	10–2–1	5–9	5–9	5–9	—	6–8	4–10	4–9–1	10–4	10–4
New York	3–10–1	4–10	11–3	5–9–1	8–6–1	8–6	8–6	—	6–7	5–9–1	10–3–2	9–4–1
Philadelphia	3–10–1	4–10	6–6	7–6	7–7	7–7	10–4	7–6	—	6–8	9–5	12–2
Pittsburgh	4–10	5–9	5–9–1	4–7–1	2–12	8–5	9–4–1	9–5–1	8–6	—	9–4	9–5
St. Louis	2–12	2–12	6–7–1	4–10	2–12	3–10–1	4–10	3–10–2	5–9	4–9	—	4–10
Washington	7–7	3–11	6–7	3–11	5–9	2–12–2	4–10	4–9–1	2–12	5–9	10–4	—

=== Roster ===
1898 St. Louis Browns
Roster
Pitchers: John Callahan; Kid Carsey; Pete Daniels; Duke Esper; Joe Gannon; George Gillpatrick; Jim Hughey; Harry Maupin; Tom Smith; Willie Sudhoff; Jack Taylor	Catchers: Jack Clements; Tom Kinslow; Joe Sugden; Infielders: Lou Bierbauer; Jack Crooks; Lave Cross; George Decker; Jim Donnelly; Russ Hall; Mike Mahoney; Joe Quinn; Germany Smith; Suter Sullivan; Tommy Tucker	Outfielders: Tommy Dowd; Dick Harley; Ducky Holmes; Jake Stenzel; Tuck Turner	Manager: Tim Hurst

== Player stats ==
=== Batting ===
==== Starters by position ====
Note: Pos = Position; G = Games played; AB = At bats; H = Hits; Avg. = Batting average; HR = Home runs; RBI = Runs batted in

Pos	Player	G	AB	H	Avg.	HR	RBI
C	Jack Clements	99	335	86	.257	3	41
1B	George Decker	76	286	74	.259	1	45
2B	Jack Crooks	72	225	52	.231	1	20
SS	Germany Smith	51	157	25	.159	1	9
3B	Lave Cross	151	602	191	.317	3	79
OF	Dick Harley	142	549	135	.246	0	42
OF	Tommy Dowd	139	586	143	.244	0	32
OF	Jake Stenzel	108	404	114	.282	1	33

==== Other batters ====
Note: G = Games played; AB = At bats; H = Hits; Avg. = Batting average; HR = Home runs; RBI = Runs batted in

Player	G	AB	H	Avg.	HR	RBI
Joe Quinn	103	375	94	.251	0	36
Joe Sugden	89	289	73	.253	0	34
Tommy Tucker	72	252	60	.238	0	20
Suter Sullivan	42	144	32	.222	0	12
Russ Hall	39	143	35	.248	0	10
Tuck Turner	35	141	28	.199	0	7
Kid Carsey	38	105	21	.200	1	10
Ducky Holmes	23	101	24	.238	0	0
Tom Kinslow	14	53	15	.283	0	4
Lou Bierbauer	4	9	0	.000	0	0
Mike Mahoney	2	7	0	.000	0	0
Jim Donnelly	1	1	1	1.000	0	0

=== Pitching ===
==== Starting pitchers ====
Note: G = Games pitched; IP = Innings pitched; W = Wins; L = Losses; ERA = Earned run average; SO = Strikeouts

Player	G	IP	W	L	ERA	SO
Jack Taylor	50	397.1	15	29	3.90	89
Willie Sudhoff	41	315.0	11	27	4.34	65
Jim Hughey	35	283.2	7	24	3.93	74
Duke Esper	10	64.2	3	5	5.98	14
Harry Maupin	2	18.0	0	2	5.50	3
Tom Smith	1	9.0	0	1	2.00	1
Joe Gannon	1	9.0	0	1	11.00	2
John Callahan	2	8.1	0	2	16.20	2

==== Other pitchers ====
Note: G = Games pitched; IP = Innings pitched; W = Wins; L = Losses; ERA = Earned run average; SO = Strikeouts

Player	G	IP	W	L	ERA	SO
Kid Carsey	20	123.2	2	12	6.33	10
Pete Daniels	10	54.2	1	6	3.62	13
George Gillpatrick	7	35.0	0	2	6.94	12

==== Relief pitchers ====
Note: G = Games pitched; W = Wins; L = Losses; SV = Saves; ERA = Earned run average; SO = Strikeouts

Player	G	W	L	SV	ERA	SO
Suter Sullivan	1	0	0	0	1.50	3

== See also ==
- List of worst Major League Baseball season records
