= 1898 Louisville Colonels season =

1898 Louisville Colonels
- League: National League
- Ballpark: Eclipse Park II
- City: Louisville, Kentucky
- Record: 70–81 (.464)
- League place: 9th
- Owners: Barney Dreyfuss
- Managers: Fred Clarke

The 1898 Louisville Colonels baseball team finished with a 70–81 record and ninth place in the National League.

== Regular season ==
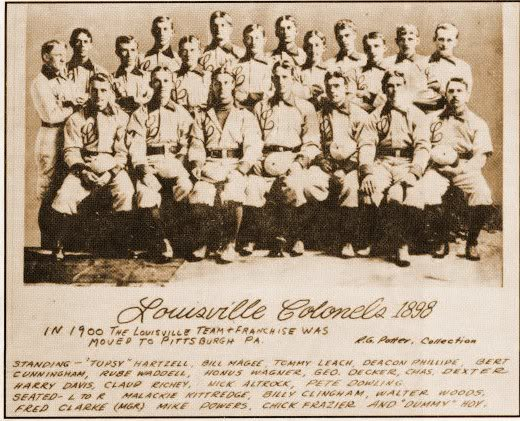
The 1898 Louisville Colonels

=== Season standings ===
National League
Team	W	L	Pct.	GB	Home	Road
Boston Beaneaters	102	47	.685	—	62‍–‍15	40‍–‍32
Baltimore Orioles	96	53	.644	6	58‍–‍15	38‍–‍38
Cincinnati Reds	92	60	.605	11½	58‍–‍28	34‍–‍32
Chicago Orphans	85	65	.567	17½	58‍–‍31	27‍–‍34
Cleveland Spiders	81	68	.544	21	36‍–‍19	45‍–‍49
Philadelphia Phillies	78	71	.523	24	49‍–‍31	29‍–‍40
New York Giants	77	73	.513	25½	45‍–‍28	32‍–‍45
Pittsburgh Pirates	72	76	.486	29½	39‍–‍35	33‍–‍41
Louisville Colonels	70	81	.464	33	43‍–‍34	27‍–‍47
Brooklyn Bridegrooms	54	91	.372	46	30‍–‍41	24‍–‍50
Washington Senators	51	101	.336	52½	34‍–‍44	17‍–‍57
St. Louis Browns	39	111	.260	63½	20‍–‍44	19‍–‍67

=== Record vs. opponents ===
1898 National League record Sources:
Team	BAL	BSN	BRO	CHI	CIN	CLE	LOU	NYG	PHI	PIT	STL	WAS
Baltimore	—	5–7	8–5–1	9–5	8–6–1	8–6–1	9–5	10–3–1	10–3–1	10–4	12–2	7–7
Boston	7–5	—	11–2	9–5	9–4–1	6–7–1	8–6–1	10–4	10–4	9–5	12–2	11–3
Brooklyn	5–8–1	2–11	—	4–10	3–11	6–7	2–10–1	3–11	6–6	9–5–1	7–6–1	7–6
Chicago	5–9	5–9	10–4	—	6–8	7–7	9–5	9–5–1	6–7	7–4–1	10–4	11–3
Cincinnati	6–8–1	4–9–1	11–3	8–6	—	8–5–2	9–5	6–8–1	7–7	12–2	12–2	9–5
Cleveland	6–8–1	7–6–1	7–6	7–7	5–8–2	—	9–5	6–8	7–7	5–8	10–3–1	12–2–2
Louisville	5–9	6–8–1	10–2–1	5–9	5–9	5–9	—	6–8	4–10	4–9–1	10–4	10–4
New York	3–10–1	4–10	11–3	5–9–1	8–6–1	8–6	8–6	—	6–7	5–9–1	10–3–2	9–4–1
Philadelphia	3–10–1	4–10	6–6	7–6	7–7	7–7	10–4	7–6	—	6–8	9–5	12–2
Pittsburgh	4–10	5–9	5–9–1	4–7–1	2–12	8–5	9–4–1	9–5–1	8–6	—	9–4	9–5
St. Louis	2–12	2–12	6–7–1	4–10	2–12	3–10–1	4–10	3–10–2	5–9	4–9	—	4–10
Washington	7–7	3–11	6–7	3–11	5–9	2–12–2	4–10	4–9–1	2–12	5–9	10–4	—

=== Roster ===
1898 Louisville Colonels
Roster
Pitchers: Nick Altrock; Dad Clarke; Bert Cunningham; Pete Dowling; Red Ehret; Chick Fraser; Bill Magee; Lou Mahaffey; Frank Todd; Catchers: Malachi Kittridge; Doc Powers; Cooney Snyder; Bill Wilson	Infielders: Scoops Carey; Billy Clingman; Harry Davis; George Decker; Tommy Leach; John Richter; Claude Ritchey; Heinie Smith; General Stafford; Tom Stouch; Billy Taylor; Honus Wagner	Outfielders: Fred Clarke; Josh Clarke; Charlie Dexter; Topsy Hartsel; Dummy Hoy; Kid Nance	Manager: Fred Clarke

== Player stats ==
=== Batting ===
==== Starters by position ====
Note: Pos = Position; G = Games played; AB = At bats; H = Hits; Avg. = Batting average; HR = Home runs; RBI = Runs batted in

Pos	Player	G	AB	H	Avg.	HR	RBI
C	Malachi Kittridge	86	287	70	.244	1	31
1B	Honus Wagner	151	588	176	.299	10	105
2B	Heinie Smith	35	121	23	.190	0	13
SS	Claude Ritchey	151	551	140	.254	5	51
3B	Billy Clingman	154	538	138	.257	0	50
OF	Charlie Dexter	112	421	132	.314	1	66
OF	Dummy Hoy	148	582	177	.304	6	66
OF	Fred Clarke	149	599	184	.307	3	47

==== Other batters ====
Note: G = Games played; AB = At bats; H = Hits; Avg. = Batting average; HR = Home runs; RBI = Runs batted in

Player	G	AB	H	Avg.	HR	RBI
General Stafford	49	181	54	.298	1	25
George Decker	42	148	44	.297	0	19
Harry Davis	37	138	30	.217	1	16
Bill Wilson	29	102	17	.167	1	13
Doc Powers	34	99	27	.273	1	19
Kid Nance	22	76	24	.316	1	16
Topsy Hartsel	22	71	23	.324	0	9
Cooney Snyder	17	61	10	.164	0	6
Scoops Carey	8	32	6	.188	0	1
Billy Taylor	9	24	6	.250	0	2
Josh Clarke	6	18	3	.167	0	0
Tom Stouch	4	16	5	.313	0	6
John Richter	3	13	2	.154	0	0
Tommy Leach	3	10	1	.100	0	0

=== Pitching ===
==== Starting pitchers ====
Note: G = Games pitched; IP = Innings pitched; W = Wins; L = Losses; ERA = Earned run average; SO = Strikeouts

Player	G	IP	W	L	ERA	SO
Bert Cunningham	44	362.0	28	15	3.16	34
Bill Magee	38	295.1	16	15	4.05	55
Pete Dowling	36	285.2	13	20	4.16	84
Chick Fraser	26	203.0	7	17	5.32	58
Red Ehret	12	89.0	3	7	5.76	20
Dad Clarke	1	9.0	0	1	5.00	1
Lou Mahaffey	1	9.0	0	1	3.00	1

==== Other pitchers ====
Note: G = Games pitched; IP = Innings pitched; W = Wins; L = Losses; ERA = Earned run average; SO = Strikeouts

Player	G	IP	W	L	ERA	SO
Nick Altrock	11	70.0	3	3	4.50	13
Frank Todd	4	11.0	0	2	13.91	5
