= 1898 Brooklyn Bridegrooms season =

1898 Brooklyn Bridegrooms
- League: National League
- Ballpark: Washington Park
- City: Brooklyn, New York
- Record: 54–94 (.365)
- League place: 10th
- Owners: Charles Ebbets, Ferdinand Abell
- President: Charles Ebbets
- Managers: Billy Barnie, Charles Ebbets, Mike Griffin

The 1898 Brooklyn Bridegrooms suffered a huge loss on January 4 when team founder Charles Byrne died. Charles Ebbets became the new president of the team and moved them into the new Washington Park. The team struggled all season, finishing in a distant tenth place in the National League race.

== Offseason ==
- November 12, 1897: George Shoch and cash were traded by the Bridegrooms to the St. Louis Browns for Bill Hallman.
- March 5, 1898: Tommy Tucker was purchased by the Bridegrooms from the Washington Senators.

== Regular season ==
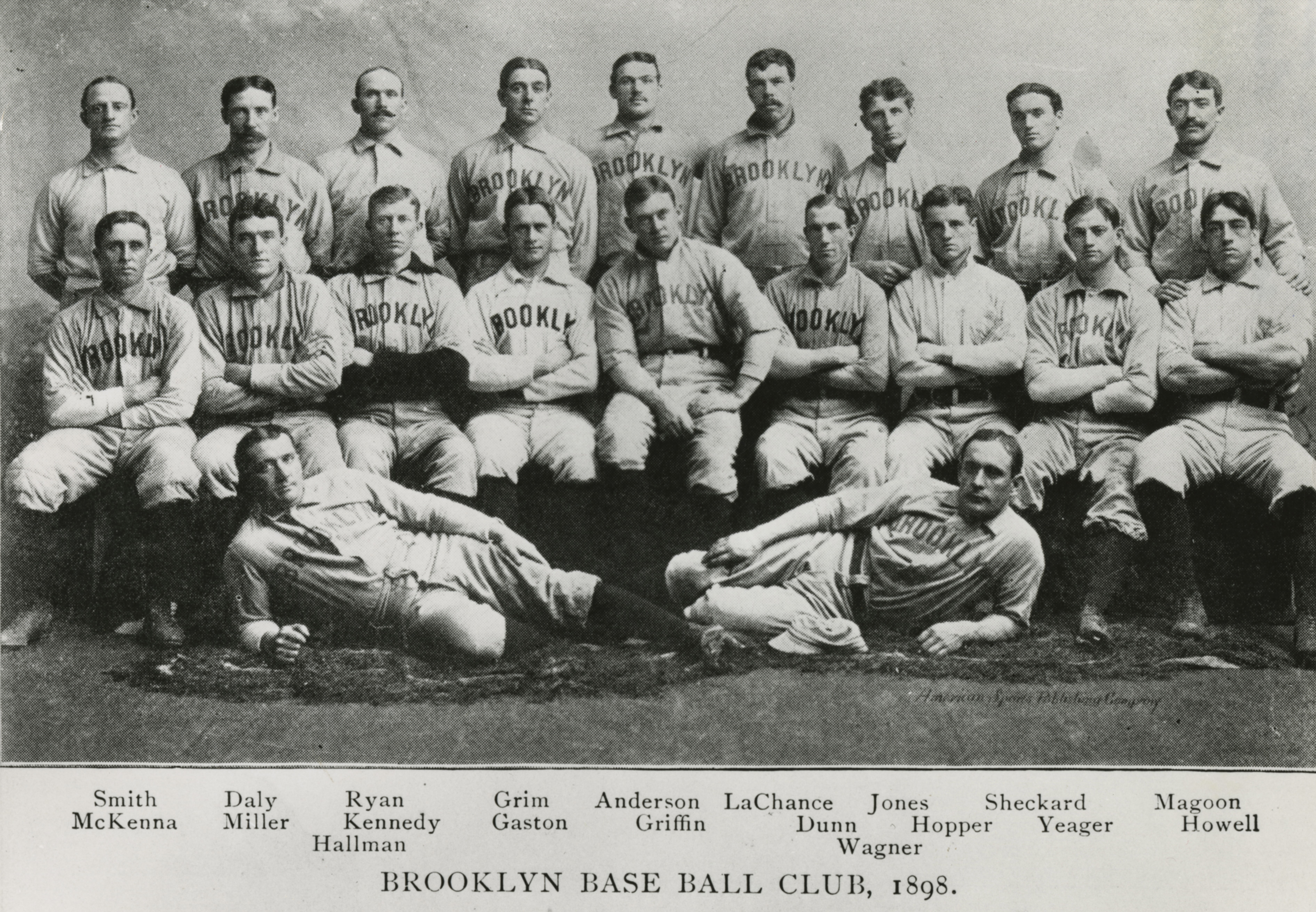
1898 Brooklyn Bridegrooms

Billy Barnie was fired as manager in June with the team's record at 15–20 and the team mired in ninth place. Ebbets took over himself for a while before they handed the team over to Mike Griffin to finish the season. The results weren't much better, as the team immediately lost five out of their next six, with an overall 39–71 record after Barnie's departure.

=== Season standings ===
National League
Team	W	L	Pct.	GB	Home	Road
Boston Beaneaters	102	47	.685	—	62‍–‍15	40‍–‍32
Baltimore Orioles	96	53	.644	6	58‍–‍15	38‍–‍38
Cincinnati Reds	92	60	.605	11½	58‍–‍28	34‍–‍32
Chicago Orphans	85	65	.567	17½	58‍–‍31	27‍–‍34
Cleveland Spiders	81	68	.544	21	36‍–‍19	45‍–‍49
Philadelphia Phillies	78	71	.523	24	49‍–‍31	29‍–‍40
New York Giants	77	73	.513	25½	45‍–‍28	32‍–‍45
Pittsburgh Pirates	72	76	.486	29½	39‍–‍35	33‍–‍41
Louisville Colonels	70	81	.464	33	43‍–‍34	27‍–‍47
Brooklyn Bridegrooms	54	91	.372	46	30‍–‍41	24‍–‍50
Washington Senators	51	101	.336	52½	34‍–‍44	17‍–‍57
St. Louis Browns	39	111	.260	63½	20‍–‍44	19‍–‍67

=== Record vs. opponents ===
1898 National League record Sources:
Team	BAL	BSN	BRO	CHI	CIN	CLE	LOU	NYG	PHI	PIT	STL	WAS
Baltimore	—	5–7	8–5–1	9–5	8–6–1	8–6–1	9–5	10–3–1	10–3–1	10–4	12–2	7–7
Boston	7–5	—	11–2	9–5	9–4–1	6–7–1	8–6–1	10–4	10–4	9–5	12–2	11–3
Brooklyn	5–8–1	2–11	—	4–10	3–11	6–7	2–10–1	3–11	6–6	9–5–1	7–6–1	7–6
Chicago	5–9	5–9	10–4	—	6–8	7–7	9–5	9–5–1	6–7	7–4–1	10–4	11–3
Cincinnati	6–8–1	4–9–1	11–3	8–6	—	8–5–2	9–5	6–8–1	7–7	12–2	12–2	9–5
Cleveland	6–8–1	7–6–1	7–6	7–7	5–8–2	—	9–5	6–8	7–7	5–8	10–3–1	12–2–2
Louisville	5–9	6–8–1	10–2–1	5–9	5–9	5–9	—	6–8	4–10	4–9–1	10–4	10–4
New York	3–10–1	4–10	11–3	5–9–1	8–6–1	8–6	8–6	—	6–7	5–9–1	10–3–2	9–4–1
Philadelphia	3–10–1	4–10	6–6	7–6	7–7	7–7	10–4	7–6	—	6–8	9–5	12–2
Pittsburgh	4–10	5–9	5–9–1	4–7–1	2–12	8–5	9–4–1	9–5–1	8–6	—	9–4	9–5
St. Louis	2–12	2–12	6–7–1	4–10	2–12	3–10–1	4–10	3–10–2	5–9	4–9	—	4–10
Washington	7–7	3–11	6–7	3–11	5–9	2–12–2	4–10	4–9–1	2–12	5–9	10–4	—

=== Notable transactions ===
- May 19, 1898: John Anderson was sent conditionally by the Bridegrooms to the Washington Senators.
- July 19, 1898: Tommy Tucker was purchased from the Bridegrooms by the St. Louis Browns.
- September 21, 1898: John Anderson was returned to the Bridegrooms by the Washington Senators.

=== Roster ===
1898 Brooklyn Bridegrooms
Roster
Pitchers: Jack Dunn; Welcome Gaston; Frank Hansford; Lefty Hopper; Elmer Horton; Harry Howell; Brickyard Kennedy; Kit McKenna; Ralph Miller; Harley Payne; Ed Stein; Joe Yeager	Catchers: John Grim; Jack Ryan; Infielders: Tom Daly; Bill Hallman; Candy LaChance; George Magoon; Billy Shindle; Tommy Tucker; Butts Wagner	Outfielders: John Anderson; Mike Griffin; Fielder Jones; Jimmy Sheckard; Aleck Smith	Managers: Billy Barnie; Charles Ebbets; Mike Griffin

== Player stats ==
=== Batting ===
==== Starters by position ====
Note: Pos = Position; G = Games played; AB = At bats; R = Runs; H = Hits; Avg. = Batting average; HR = Home runs; RBI = Runs batted in; SB = Stolen bases

Pos	Player	G	AB	R	H	Avg.	HR	RBI	SB
C	Jack Ryan	87	301	39	57	.189	0	24	5
1B	Candy LaChance	136	526	62	130	.247	5	65	23
2B	Bill Hallman	134	509	57	124	.244	2	63	9
3B	Billy Shindle	120	466	50	105	.225	1	41	3
SS	George Magoon	93	343	35	77	.224	1	39	7
OF	Fielder Jones	146	596	89	181	.304	1	69	36
OF	Mike Griffin	134	537	88	161	.300	2	40	15
OF	Jimmy Sheckard	105	408	51	113	.277	4	64	8

==== Other batters ====
Note: G = Games played; AB = At bats; R = Runs; H = Hits; Avg. = Batting average; HR = Home runs; RBI = Runs batted in; SB = Stolen bases

Player	G	AB	R	H	Avg.	HR	RBI	SB
Tommy Tucker	73	283	35	79	.279	1	34	1
Aleck Smith	52	199	25	52	.261	0	23	7
John Grim	52	178	17	50	.281	0	11	1
John Anderson	25	90	12	22	.244	0	10	2
Tom Daly	23	73	11	24	.329	0	11	6
Butts Wagner	11	38	2	9	.237	0	3	0

=== Pitching ===
==== Starting pitchers ====
Note: G = Games pitched; GS = Games started; IP = Innings pitched; W = Wins; L = Losses; ERA = Earned run average; BB = Bases on balls; SO = Strikeouts; CG = Complete games

Player	G	GS	IP	W	L	ERA	BB	SO	CG
Brickyard Kennedy	40	39	339.1	16	22	3.37	123	73	38
Jack Dunn	41	37	322.2	16	21	3.60	82	66	31
Joe Yeager	36	33	291.1	12	22	3.65	80	70	32
Ralph Miller	23	21	151.2	4	14	5.34	86	43	16
Harry Howell	2	2	18.0	2	0	5.00	11	2	2
Welcome Gaston	2	2	16.0	1	1	2.81	9	0	2
Lefty Hopper	2	2	11.0	0	2	4.91	5	5	2
Elmer Horton	1	1	9.0	0	1	10.00	6	0	1
Harley Payne	1	1	9.0	1	0	4.00	3	2	1

==== Other pitchers ====
Note: G = Games pitched; GS = Games started; IP = Innings pitched; W = Wins; L = Losses; ERA = Earned run average; BB = Bases on balls; SO = Strikeouts; CG = Complete games

Player	G	GS	IP	W	L	ERA	BB	SO	CG
Kit McKenna	14	9	100.2	2	6	5.63	4	57	27
Ed Stein	3	2	23.0	0	2	5.48	9	6	2

==== Relief pitchers ====
Note: G = Games pitched; IP = Innings pitched; W = Wins; L = Losses; SV = Saves; ERA = Earned run average; BB = Bases on balls; SO = Strikeouts

Player	G	IP	W	L	SV	ERA	BB	SO
Frank Hansford	1	7.0	0	0	0	3.86	5	0
