= 1898 Cleveland Spiders season =

1898 Cleveland Spiders
- League: National League
- Ballpark: League Park
- City: Cleveland, Ohio
- Record: 81–68 (.544)
- League place: 5th
- Owners: Frank Robison
- Managers: Patsy Tebeau

The 1898 Cleveland Spiders finished with an 81–68 record, good for fifth place in the National League. After the season, the team's owners, Frank and Stanley Robison, additionally purchased the St. Louis Browns from Chris von der Ahe. Claiming disappointment in attendance in Cleveland, they transferred many of the Spiders' better players to the St. Louis team, which they renamed the Perfectos. The Spiders would fold after the 1899 season.

== Regular season ==
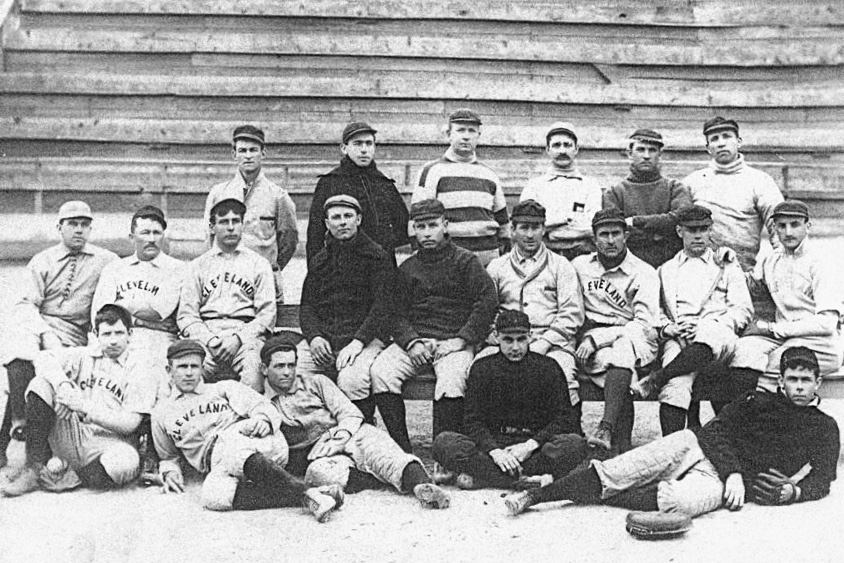
1898 Cleveland Spiders

=== Season standings ===
National League
Team	W	L	Pct.	GB	Home	Road
Boston Beaneaters	102	47	.685	—	62‍–‍15	40‍–‍32
Baltimore Orioles	96	53	.644	6	58‍–‍15	38‍–‍38
Cincinnati Reds	92	60	.605	11½	58‍–‍28	34‍–‍32
Chicago Orphans	85	65	.567	17½	58‍–‍31	27‍–‍34
Cleveland Spiders	81	68	.544	21	36‍–‍19	45‍–‍49
Philadelphia Phillies	78	71	.523	24	49‍–‍31	29‍–‍40
New York Giants	77	73	.513	25½	45‍–‍28	32‍–‍45
Pittsburgh Pirates	72	76	.486	29½	39‍–‍35	33‍–‍41
Louisville Colonels	70	81	.464	33	43‍–‍34	27‍–‍47
Brooklyn Bridegrooms	54	91	.372	46	30‍–‍41	24‍–‍50
Washington Senators	51	101	.336	52½	34‍–‍44	17‍–‍57
St. Louis Browns	39	111	.260	63½	20‍–‍44	19‍–‍67

=== Record vs. opponents ===
1898 National League record Sources:
Team	BAL	BSN	BRO	CHI	CIN	CLE	LOU	NYG	PHI	PIT	STL	WAS
Baltimore	—	5–7	8–5–1	9–5	8–6–1	8–6–1	9–5	10–3–1	10–3–1	10–4	12–2	7–7
Boston	7–5	—	11–2	9–5	9–4–1	6–7–1	8–6–1	10–4	10–4	9–5	12–2	11–3
Brooklyn	5–8–1	2–11	—	4–10	3–11	6–7	2–10–1	3–11	6–6	9–5–1	7–6–1	7–6
Chicago	5–9	5–9	10–4	—	6–8	7–7	9–5	9–5–1	6–7	7–4–1	10–4	11–3
Cincinnati	6–8–1	4–9–1	11–3	8–6	—	8–5–2	9–5	6–8–1	7–7	12–2	12–2	9–5
Cleveland	6–8–1	7–6–1	7–6	7–7	5–8–2	—	9–5	6–8	7–7	5–8	10–3–1	12–2–2
Louisville	5–9	6–8–1	10–2–1	5–9	5–9	5–9	—	6–8	4–10	4–9–1	10–4	10–4
New York	3–10–1	4–10	11–3	5–9–1	8–6–1	8–6	8–6	—	6–7	5–9–1	10–3–2	9–4–1
Philadelphia	3–10–1	4–10	6–6	7–6	7–7	7–7	10–4	7–6	—	6–8	9–5	12–2
Pittsburgh	4–10	5–9	5–9–1	4–7–1	2–12	8–5	9–4–1	9–5–1	8–6	—	9–4	9–5
St. Louis	2–12	2–12	6–7–1	4–10	2–12	3–10–1	4–10	3–10–2	5–9	4–9	—	4–10
Washington	7–7	3–11	6–7	3–11	5–9	2–12–2	4–10	4–9–1	2–12	5–9	10–4	—

=== Roster ===
1898 Cleveland Spiders
Roster
Pitchers: Frank Bates; George Cuppy; Chick Fraser; Cowboy Jones; George Kelb; Sport McAllister; Pete McBride; Jack Powell; Zeke Wilson; Cy Young	Catchers: Lou Criger; Ossee Schreckengost; Chief Zimmer; Infielders: Jimmy Burke; Cupid Childs; Ed McKean; Jack O'Connor; Patsy Tebeau; Bobby Wallace	Outfielders: Ed Biecher; Harry Blake; Jesse Burkett; Fred Frank; Emmet Heidrick; Jimmy McAleer; Louis Sockalexis	Manager: Patsy Tebeau

== Player stats ==
=== Batting ===
==== Starters by position ====
Note: Pos = Position; G = Games played; AB = At bats; H = Hits; Avg. = Batting average; HR = Home runs; RBI = Runs batted in

Pos	Player	G	AB	H	Avg.	HR	RBI
C	Lou Criger	84	287	80	.279	1	32
1B	Patsy Tebeau	131	477	123	.258	1	63
2B	Cupid Childs	110	413	119	.288	1	31
SS	Ed McKean	151	604	172	.285	9	94
3B	Bobby Wallace	154	593	160	.270	3	99
OF	Jimmy McAleer	106	366	87	.238	0	48
OF	Jesse Burkett	150	624	213	.341	0	42
OF	Harry Blake	136	474	116	.245	0	58

==== Other batters ====
Note: G = Games played; AB = At bats; H = Hits; Avg. = Batting average; HR = Home runs; RBI = Runs batted in

Player	G	AB	H	Avg.	HR	RBI
Jack O'Connor	131	478	119	.249	1	56
Emmet Heidrick	19	76	23	.303	0	8
Louis Sockalexis	21	67	15	.224	0	10
Chief Zimmer	20	63	15	.238	0	4
Sport McAllister	17	57	13	.228	0	9
Fred Frank	17	53	11	.208	0	3
Jimmy Burke	13	38	4	.105	0	1
Ossee Schrecongost	10	35	11	.314	0	10
Ed Biecher	8	25	5	.200	0	0

=== Pitching ===
==== Starting pitchers ====
Note: G = Games pitched; IP = Innings pitched; W = Wins; L = Losses; ERA = Earned run average; SO = Strikeouts

Player	G	IP	W	L	ERA	SO
Cy Young	46	377.2	25	13	2.53	101
Jack Powell	42	342.0	25	15	3.00	93
Zeke Wilson	33	254.2	13	18	3.60	45
George Cuppy	18	128.0	9	8	3.30	27
Cowboy Jones	9	72.0	4	4	3.00	26
Sport McAllister	9	65.1	3	4	4.55	9
Chick Fraser	6	42.0	2	3	5.57	19
Frank Bates	4	29.0	2	1	3.10	5
Pete McBride	1	7.0	0	1	6.43	6

==== Other pitchers ====
Note: G = Games pitched; IP = Innings pitched; W = Wins; L = Losses; ERA = Earned run average; SO = Strikeouts

Player	G	IP	W	L	ERA	SO
George Kelb	3	16.1	0	1	4.41	8
