= 1898 New York Giants season =

1898 New York Giants
- League: National League
- Ballpark: Polo Grounds
- City: New York City
- Record: 77–73 (.513)
- League place: 7th
- Owners: Andrew Freedman
- Managers: Bill Joyce, Cap Anson

The 1898 New York Giants season was the franchise's 16th season. The team finished in seventh place in the National League with a 77–73 record, 25.5 games behind the Boston Beaneaters.

== Regular season ==
=== Season standings ===
National League
Team	W	L	Pct.	GB	Home	Road
Boston Beaneaters	102	47	.685	—	62‍–‍15	40‍–‍32
Baltimore Orioles	96	53	.644	6	58‍–‍15	38‍–‍38
Cincinnati Reds	92	60	.605	11½	58‍–‍28	34‍–‍32
Chicago Orphans	85	65	.567	17½	58‍–‍31	27‍–‍34
Cleveland Spiders	81	68	.544	21	36‍–‍19	45‍–‍49
Philadelphia Phillies	78	71	.523	24	49‍–‍31	29‍–‍40
New York Giants	77	73	.513	25½	45‍–‍28	32‍–‍45
Pittsburgh Pirates	72	76	.486	29½	39‍–‍35	33‍–‍41
Louisville Colonels	70	81	.464	33	43‍–‍34	27‍–‍47
Brooklyn Bridegrooms	54	91	.372	46	30‍–‍41	24‍–‍50
Washington Senators	51	101	.336	52½	34‍–‍44	17‍–‍57
St. Louis Browns	39	111	.260	63½	20‍–‍44	19‍–‍67

=== Record vs. opponents ===
1898 National League record Sources:
Team	BAL	BSN	BRO	CHI	CIN	CLE	LOU	NYG	PHI	PIT	STL	WAS
Baltimore	—	5–7	8–5–1	9–5	8–6–1	8–6–1	9–5	10–3–1	10–3–1	10–4	12–2	7–7
Boston	7–5	—	11–2	9–5	9–4–1	6–7–1	8–6–1	10–4	10–4	9–5	12–2	11–3
Brooklyn	5–8–1	2–11	—	4–10	3–11	6–7	2–10–1	3–11	6–6	9–5–1	7–6–1	7–6
Chicago	5–9	5–9	10–4	—	6–8	7–7	9–5	9–5–1	6–7	7–4–1	10–4	11–3
Cincinnati	6–8–1	4–9–1	11–3	8–6	—	8–5–2	9–5	6–8–1	7–7	12–2	12–2	9–5
Cleveland	6–8–1	7–6–1	7–6	7–7	5–8–2	—	9–5	6–8	7–7	5–8	10–3–1	12–2–2
Louisville	5–9	6–8–1	10–2–1	5–9	5–9	5–9	—	6–8	4–10	4–9–1	10–4	10–4
New York	3–10–1	4–10	11–3	5–9–1	8–6–1	8–6	8–6	—	6–7	5–9–1	10–3–2	9–4–1
Philadelphia	3–10–1	4–10	6–6	7–6	7–7	7–7	10–4	7–6	—	6–8	9–5	12–2
Pittsburgh	4–10	5–9	5–9–1	4–7–1	2–12	8–5	9–4–1	9–5–1	8–6	—	9–4	9–5
St. Louis	2–12	2–12	6–7–1	4–10	2–12	3–10–1	4–10	3–10–2	5–9	4–9	—	4–10
Washington	7–7	3–11	6–7	3–11	5–9	2–12–2	4–10	4–9–1	2–12	5–9	10–4	—

=== Roster ===
1898 New York Giants
Roster
Pitchers: Bill Carrick; Ed Doheny; Jouett Meekin; Jock Menefee; Amos Rusie; Cy Seymour	Catchers: Mike Grady; Tacks Latimer; Jack Warner; Dave Zearfoss; Infielders: George Davis; Kid Gleason; Ed Glenn; Fred Hartman; Bill Joyce; John Puhl	Outfielders: Jack Doyle; Pop Foster; Charlie Gettig; Jack Gilbert; Tom McCreery; Joe Regan; Mike Tiernan; George Van Haltren; Walt Wilmot; Parke Wilson	Manager: Cap Anson; Bill Joyce

== Player stats ==
=== Batting ===
==== Starters by position ====
Note: Pos = Position; G = Games played; AB = At bats; H = Hits; Avg. = Batting average; HR = Home runs; RBI = Runs batted in

Pos	Player	G	AB	H	Avg.	HR	RBI
C	Jack Warner	110	373	96	.257	0	42
1B	Bill Joyce	145	508	131	.258	10	91
2B	Kid Gleason	150	570	126	.221	0	62
SS	George Davis	121	486	149	.307	2	86
3B	Fred Hartman	123	475	129	.272	2	88
OF	Mike Tiernan	103	415	116	.280	5	49
OF	George Van Haltren	156	654	204	.312	2	68
OF	Jack Doyle	82	297	84	.283	1	43

==== Other batters ====
Note: G = Games played; AB = At bats; H = Hits; Avg. = Batting average; HR = Home runs; RBI = Runs batted in

Player	G	AB	H	Avg.	HR	RBI
Mike Grady	93	287	85	.296	3	49
Charlie Gettig	64	196	49	.250	0	26
Walt Wilmot	35	138	33	.239	2	22
Tom McCreery	35	121	24	.198	1	17
Pop Foster	32	112	30	.268	0	9
Tacks Latimer	5	17	5	.294	0	1
John Puhl	2	9	2	.222	0	1
Joe Regan	2	5	1	.200	0	2
Ed Glenn	2	4	1	.250	0	0
Jack Gilbert	1	4	1	.250	0	0
Parke Wilson	1	4	0	.000	0	0
Dave Zearfoss	1	1	1	1.000	0	0

=== Pitching ===
==== Starting pitchers ====
Note: G = Games pitched; IP = Innings pitched; W = Wins; L = Losses; ERA = Earned run average; SO = Strikeouts

Player	G	IP	W	L	ERA	SO
Cy Seymour	45	356.2	25	19	3.18	239
Jouett Meekin	38	320.0	16	18	3.77	82
Amos Rusie	37	300.0	20	11	3.03	114
Ed Doheny	28	213.0	7	19	3.68	96
Bill Carrick	5	39.2	3	1	3.40	10
Jock Menefee	1	9.1	0	1	4.82	3

==== Other pitchers ====
Note: G = Games pitched; IP = Innings pitched; W = Wins; L = Losses; ERA = Earned run average; SO = Strikeouts

Player	G	IP	W	L	ERA	SO
Charlie Gettig	17	115.0	6	3	3.83	14
