= 1898 Philadelphia Phillies season =

National League season

1898 Philadelphia Phillies
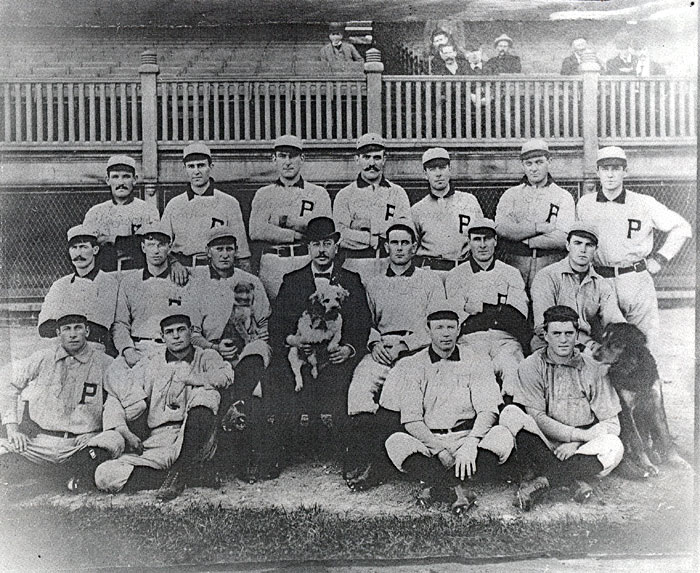
- 1898 Philadelphia Phillies
- League: National League
- Ballpark: National League Park
- City: Philadelphia, Pennsylvania
- Record: 78–71 (.523)
- League place: 6th
- Owners: Al Reach, John Rogers
- Managers: George Stallings, Bill Shettsline

The 1898 Philadelphia Phillies season was the franchise's 16th season in the National League, and 12th season playing home games at National League Park at Broad and Huntingdon Streets.

== Spring Training ==
The Phillies returned to Cape May, New Jersey for spring training for the third time. As late as January 1898, manager Bill Shettsline had favored the south while team owner Colonel John Rogers desired Cape May. The team stayed at the Aldine Hotel which had been their headquarters in 1891, but returned to practice and play intrasquad games at the Cape May Athletic Park behind the Chalfonte Hotel.

== Regular season ==
=== Season standings ===
National League
Team	W	L	Pct.	GB	Home	Road
Boston Beaneaters	102	47	.685	—	62‍–‍15	40‍–‍32
Baltimore Orioles	96	53	.644	6	58‍–‍15	38‍–‍38
Cincinnati Reds	92	60	.605	11½	58‍–‍28	34‍–‍32
Chicago Orphans	85	65	.567	17½	58‍–‍31	27‍–‍34
Cleveland Spiders	81	68	.544	21	36‍–‍19	45‍–‍49
Philadelphia Phillies	78	71	.523	24	49‍–‍31	29‍–‍40
New York Giants	77	73	.513	25½	45‍–‍28	32‍–‍45
Pittsburgh Pirates	72	76	.486	29½	39‍–‍35	33‍–‍41
Louisville Colonels	70	81	.464	33	43‍–‍34	27‍–‍47
Brooklyn Bridegrooms	54	91	.372	46	30‍–‍41	24‍–‍50
Washington Senators	51	101	.336	52½	34‍–‍44	17‍–‍57
St. Louis Browns	39	111	.260	63½	20‍–‍44	19‍–‍67

=== Record vs. opponents ===
1898 National League record Sources:
Team	BAL	BSN	BRO	CHI	CIN	CLE	LOU	NYG	PHI	PIT	STL	WAS
Baltimore	—	5–7	8–5–1	9–5	8–6–1	8–6–1	9–5	10–3–1	10–3–1	10–4	12–2	7–7
Boston	7–5	—	11–2	9–5	9–4–1	6–7–1	8–6–1	10–4	10–4	9–5	12–2	11–3
Brooklyn	5–8–1	2–11	—	4–10	3–11	6–7	2–10–1	3–11	6–6	9–5–1	7–6–1	7–6
Chicago	5–9	5–9	10–4	—	6–8	7–7	9–5	9–5–1	6–7	7–4–1	10–4	11–3
Cincinnati	6–8–1	4–9–1	11–3	8–6	—	8–5–2	9–5	6–8–1	7–7	12–2	12–2	9–5
Cleveland	6–8–1	7–6–1	7–6	7–7	5–8–2	—	9–5	6–8	7–7	5–8	10–3–1	12–2–2
Louisville	5–9	6–8–1	10–2–1	5–9	5–9	5–9	—	6–8	4–10	4–9–1	10–4	10–4
New York	3–10–1	4–10	11–3	5–9–1	8–6–1	8–6	8–6	—	6–7	5–9–1	10–3–2	9–4–1
Philadelphia	3–10–1	4–10	6–6	7–6	7–7	7–7	10–4	7–6	—	6–8	9–5	12–2
Pittsburgh	4–10	5–9	5–9–1	4–7–1	2–12	8–5	9–4–1	9–5–1	8–6	—	9–4	9–5
St. Louis	2–12	2–12	6–7–1	4–10	2–12	3–10–1	4–10	3–10–2	5–9	4–9	—	4–10
Washington	7–7	3–11	6–7	3–11	5–9	2–12–2	4–10	4–9–1	2–12	5–9	10–4	—

=== Roster ===
1898 Philadelphia Phillies
Roster
Pitchers: Bob Becker; Bert Conn; Red Donahue; Bill Duggleby; Davey Dunkle; Jack Fifield; Ed Murphy; Al Orth; Wiley Piatt; George Wheeler	Catchers: Ike Fisher; Ed McFarland; Morgan Murphy; Infielders: Ed Abbaticchio; Jack Boyle; Monte Cross; Klondike Douglass; Nap Lajoie; Billy Lauder; Billy Nash	Outfielders: Duff Cooley; Ed Delahanty; Elmer Flick; Dave Fultz; Sam Thompson; Other batters: George Stallings	Manager: George Stallings; Bill Shettsline

== Player stats ==
=== Batting ===
==== Starters by position ====
Note: Pos = Position; G = Games played; AB = At bats; H = Hits; Avg. = Batting average; HR = Home runs; RBI = Runs batted in

Pos	Player	G	AB	H	Avg.	HR	RBI
C	Ed McFarland	121	429	121	.282	3	71
1B	Klondike Douglass	146	582	150	.258	2	48
2B	Nap Lajoie	147	608	197	.324	6	127
SS	Monte Cross	149	525	135	.257	1	50
3B	Billy Lauder	97	361	95	.263	2	67
OF	Elmer Flick	134	453	137	.302	8	81
OF	Ed Delahanty	144	548	183	.334	4	92
OF	Duff Cooley	149	629	196	.312	4	55

==== Other batters ====
Note: G = Games played; AB = At bats; H = Hits; Avg. = Batting average; HR = Home runs; RBI = Runs batted in

Player	G	AB	H	Avg.	HR	RBI
Ed Abbaticchio	25	92	21	.228	0	14
Morgan Murphy	25	86	17	.198	0	11
Billy Nash	20	70	17	.243	0	9
Sam Thompson	14	63	22	.349	1	15
Dave Fultz	19	55	10	.182	0	5
Kid Elberfeld	14	38	9	.237	0	7
Ike Fisher	9	26	3	.115	0	0
Jack Boyle	6	22	2	.091	0	3
George Stallings	1	0	0	----	0	0

=== Pitching ===
==== Starting pitchers ====
Note: G = Games pitched; IP = Innings pitched; W = Wins; L = Losses; ERA = Earned run average; SO = Strikeouts

Player	G	IP	W	L	ERA	SO
Wiley Piatt	39	306.0	24	14	3.18	121
Red Donahue	35	284.1	16	17	3.55	57
Al Orth	32	250.0	15	13	3.02	52
Jack Fifield	21	171.1	11	9	3.31	31
George Wheeler	15	112.1	6	8	4.17	20
Bert Conn	1	7.0	0	1	6.43	3

==== Other pitchers ====
Note: G = Games pitched; IP = Innings pitched; W = Wins; L = Losses; ERA = Earned run average; SO = Strikeouts

Player	G	IP	W	L	ERA	SO
Davey Dunkle	12	68.1	1	4	6.98	21
Bill Duggleby	9	54.0	3	3	5.50	12
Ed Murphy	7	30.0	1	2	5.10	8

==== Relief pitchers ====
Note: G = Games pitched; W = Wins; L = Losses; SV = Saves; ERA = Earned run average; SO = Strikeouts

Player	G	W	L	SV	ERA	SO
Bob Becker	1	0	0	0	10.80	0
