= List of Major League Baseball career hit by pitch leaders =

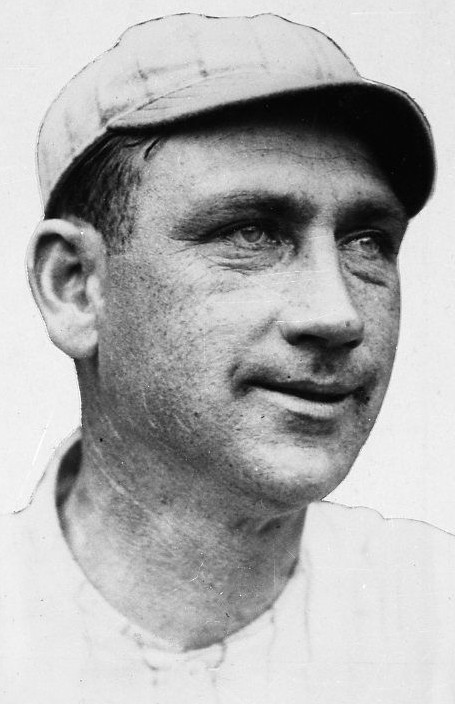
Hughie Jennings holds the record for most times hit by a pitch.

In baseball, hit by pitch (HBP) is a situation in which a batter or his clothing or equipment (other than his bat) is struck directly by a pitch from the pitcher; the batter is called a hit batsman (HB). A hit batsman is awarded first base, provided that (in the plate umpire's judgment) he made an honest effort to avoid the pitch, although failure to do so is rarely called by an umpire. Being hit by a pitch is often caused by a batter standing too close to, or "crowding", home plate.

Below is the list of the top 100 Major League Baseball players who have been hit by a pitch in their MLB careers.

Hughie Jennings holds the Major League record for most hit by pitches, getting hit 287 times in his career. Craig Biggio (285), Tommy Tucker (272), Don Baylor (267), Jason Kendall (254), Ron Hunt (243), Dan McGann (230), Anthony Rizzo (222), and Chase Utley (204) are the only other players to be hit by 200 or more pitches during their careers.

== Key ==
**Rank**	Rank amongst leaders in career hit batsmen. A blank field indicates a tie.
**Player (2026 HBP)**	Number of times hit by pitch during the 2026 Major League Baseball season.
**HBP**	Total career times hit by pitch.
*	Denotes elected to National Baseball Hall of Fame.
**Bold**	Denotes active player. (Note: A player is considered inactive if he has announced his retirement or has not played for a full season.)

== List ==
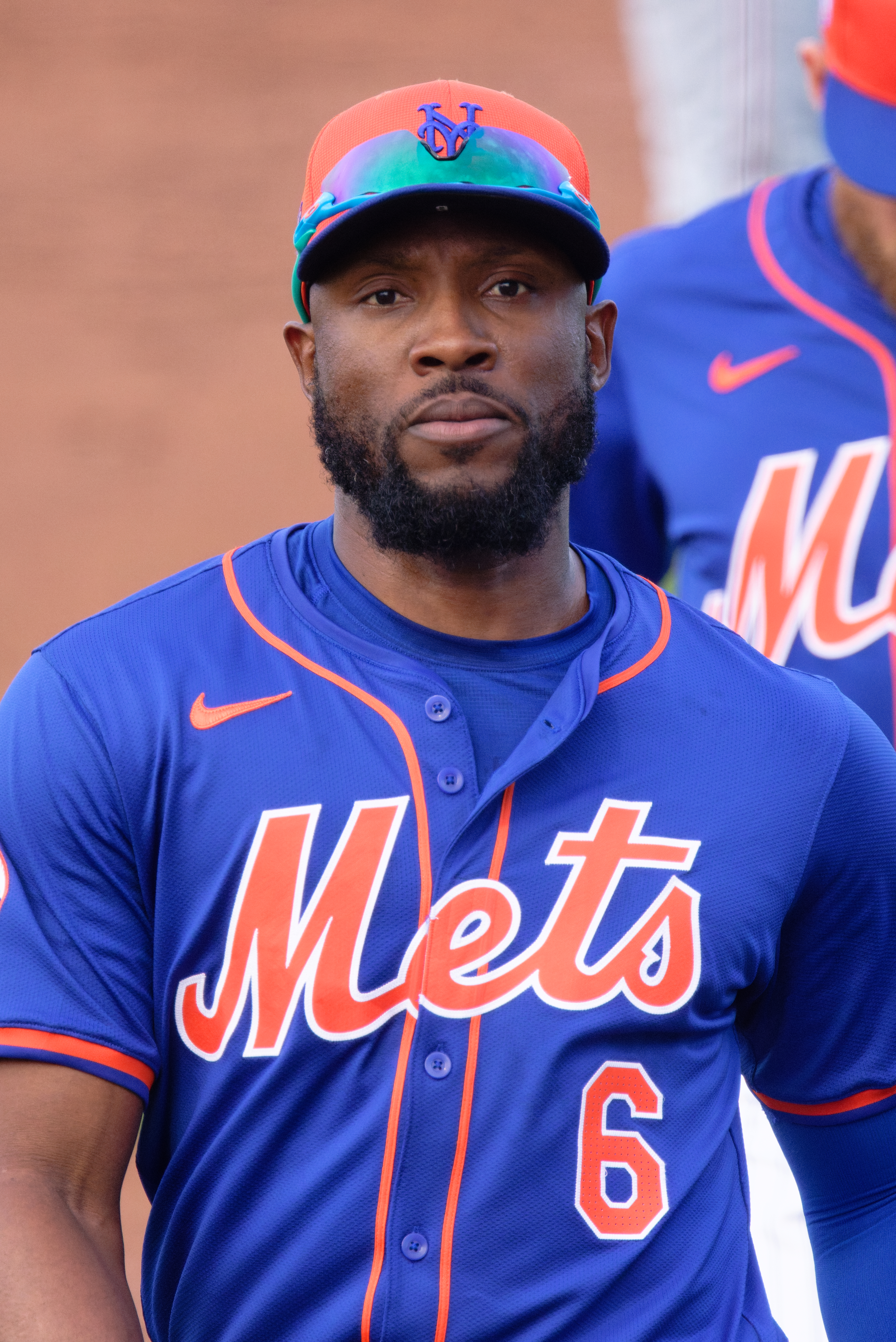
Starling Marte, the active leader and tied for 18th all-time in being hit by pitches.

- Stats updated as of September 27, 2026.

Rank	Player (2026 HBP)	HBP
1	Hughie Jennings*	287
2	Craig Biggio*	285
3	Tommy Tucker	272
4	Don Baylor	267
5	Jason Kendall	254
6	Ron Hunt	243
7	Dan McGann	230
8	Anthony Rizzo	222
9	Chase Utley	204
10	Frank Robinson*	198
11	Minnie Miñoso*	197
12	Jake Beckley*	183
13	Jason Giambi	180
14	Andrés Galarraga	178
15	Alex Rodriguez	176
16	Curt Welch	173
17	Carlos Delgado	172
18	Derek Jeter*	170
	**Starling Marte (4)**	170
20	Kid Elberfeld	165
21	Fernando Viña	157
22	Brady Anderson	154
	Fred Clarke*	154
24	**Willson Contreras (24)**	153
25	Shin-Soo Choo	152
26	Chet Lemon	151
27	José Guillén	145
28	David Eckstein	143
	Carlton Fisk*	143
30	Nellie Fox*	142
31	**Mark Canha (0)**	141
	Art Fletcher	141
33	Bill Dahlen	140
	**Ty France (14)**	140
35	Chuck Knoblauch	139
36	Larry Walker*	138
37	Frank Chance*	137
38	**Justin Turner (0)**	136
39	Gary Sheffield	135
40	Dummy Hoy	134
	Reed Johnson	134
	Nap Lajoie*	134
	John McGraw*	134
	Rickie Weeks Jr.	134
45	Steve Brodie	132
	Damion Easley	132
47	Brian Downing	129
	Willie Keeler*	129
	A. J. Pierzynski	129
50	Jeff Bagwell*	128

Rank	Player (2026 HBP)	HBP
51	Carlos Quentin	127
	Aramis Ramírez	127
	Scott Rolen*	127
54	Aaron Rowand	126
55	José Abreu	125
	Jeff Kent*	125
	Honus Wagner*	125
58	**Randy Arozarena (26)**	124
	Prince Fielder	124
	Matt Holliday	124
61	Derek Dietrich	123
	Albert Pujols	123
63	Miguel Tejada	122
64	Alex Gordon	121
65	Buck Herzog	120
66	Kurt Suzuki	119
67	**Freddie Freeman (5)**	118
68	Melvin Mora	117
	**Mike Trout (11)**	117
70	Jimmy Dykes	115
	Sherm Lollar	115
72	Frankie Crosetti	114
	Bill Freehan	114
74	**Pete Alonso (12)**	112
	Carlos Gómez	112
	**Eugenio Suárez (9)**	112
	Josh Willingham	112
78	Andre Dawson*	111
	Steve Evans	111
	Luis Gonzalez	111
	Mark Teixeira	111
82	Charlie Blackmon	110
	George Burns	110
	Jon Jay	110
85	Sherry Magee	109
	**Salvador Perez (13)**	109
	Manny Ramirez	109
88	David DeJesus	108
	Bill Joyce	108
	Mo Vaughn	108
91	Jason LaRue	107
	Russell Martin	107
	Pete Rose	107
	Wally Schang	107
95	Barry Bonds	106
96	Dan Brouthers*	105
	Edwin Encarnación	105
	Mark Grudzielanek	105
99	Paul Konerko	104
	Kevin Youkilis	104

== General references ==
- Kurkjian, Tim (2016-05-03). "I'm Fascinated by Sacrifice Flies: Inside the Game We All Love". Google Books. Macmillan + ORM. p. 46.
- Taylor, John (2009-08-17). "First Down: 5 best at getting hit by pitches". The Washington Times.

== See also ==
- Baseball statistics
- List of Major League Baseball leaders in bases on balls
