= Elmer Flick =

American baseball player (1876–1971)

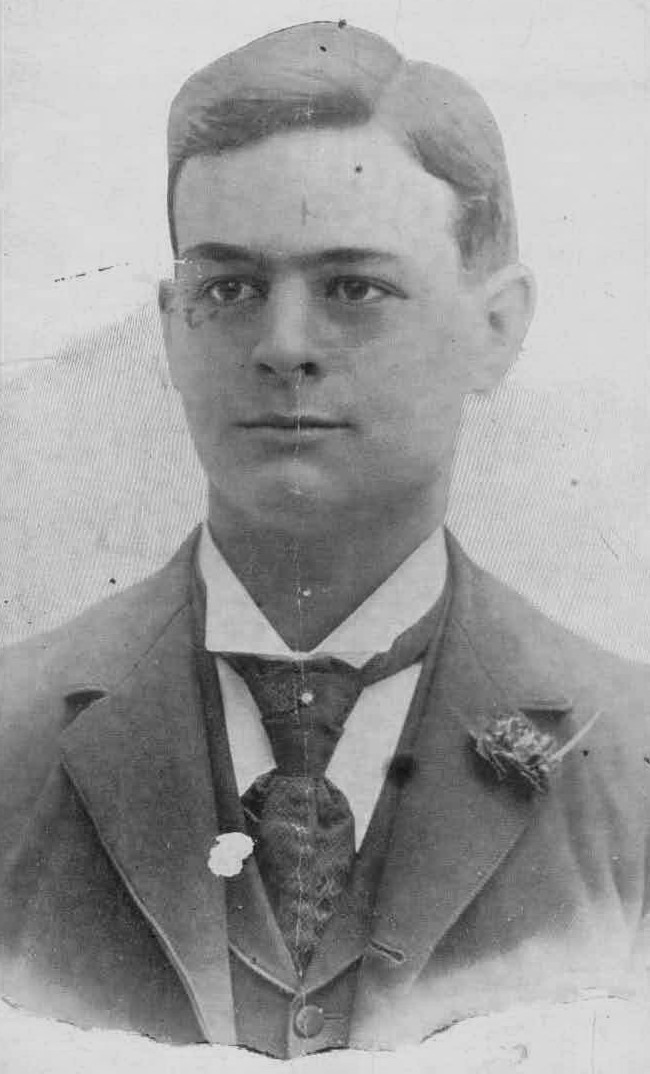
- Flick in 1899
- Right fielder
- Born: January 11, 1876; Bedford, Ohio, U.S.
- Died: January 9, 1971 (aged 94); Bedford, Ohio, U.S.
- Batted: Left Threw: Right

MLB debut
- May 2, 1898, for the Philadelphia Phillies

Last MLB appearance
- July 4, 1910, for the Cleveland Naps

MLB statistics
- Batting average: .313
- Home runs: 48
- Runs batted in: 756
- Stolen bases: 330
- Stats at Baseball Reference

Teams
- Philadelphia Phillies (1898–1901); Philadelphia Athletics (1902); Cleveland Bronchos / Naps (1902–1910)

Career highlights and awards
- AL batting champion (1905); NL RBI leader (1900); 2× AL stolen base leader (1904, 1906); Cleveland Guardians Hall of Fame

Member of the National

Baseball Hall of Fame
- Induction: 1963
- Election method: Veterans Committee

Elmer Harrison Flick (January 11, 1876 – January 9, 1971) was an American professional baseball outfielder who played in Major League Baseball from 1898 to 1910 for the Philadelphia Phillies, Philadelphia Athletics, and Cleveland Bronchos/Naps. In 1,483 career games, Flick recorded a .313 batting average while accumulating 164 triples, 1,752 hits, 330 stolen bases, and 756 runs batted in (RBIs). He was elected to the Baseball Hall of Fame in 1963.

Flick began his career in semi-professional baseball and played in minor league baseball for two years. He was noticed by George Stallings, the manager of the Phillies, who signed Flick as a reserve outfielder. Flick was pressed into a starting role in 1898 when an injury forced another player to retire. He excelled as a starter. Flick jumped to the Athletics in 1902, but a court injunction prevented him from playing in Pennsylvania. He joined the Naps, where he continued to play for the remainder of his major league career, which was curtailed by a stomach ailment.

Flick was known predominantly for his solid batting and speed. He led the National League in RBIs in 1900, and led the American League in stolen bases in 1904 and 1906, and in batting average in 1905.

== Early life ==
Flick was born on January 11, 1876, the third of five children of Zachary and Mary Flick, on the family farm in Bedford, Ohio. His father was a farmer and mechanic who had served in the American Civil War. Flick attended Bedford High School, where he played catcher on the school's baseball team. He also played American football, wrestled, and boxed.

Flick entered semi-professional baseball by chance. When he was 15 years old, he was at a train station to support the local baseball team as it left for a road trip. Only eight of the team's players showed up at the station, so Flick was recruited to go on the trip with the team. Though Flick did not have a uniform or shoes, he hit well in both games of the doubleheader, though Bedford lost both games. He joined the Bedford team on a regular basis, and he continued to play semi-pro baseball throughout his teenage years.

== Professional career ==
=== Minor league baseball ===
In 1896, the manager of the Youngstown Puddlers of the Interstate League signed Flick. Because the team had an established catcher, Flick played in the outfield, where he struggled to learn the position. In 31 games, Flick had a .826 fielding percentage. However, Flick had a strong performance offensively. Using his father's lathe, Flick crafted his own baseball bat, which he used to hit for a .438 batting average.

The next year, Flick played for the Dayton Old Soldiers, also in the Interstate League, as their regular left fielder. His defense improved, as he compiled a .921 fielding percentage, and he batted .386. He also led the league with 20 triples and 295 total bases.

=== Major League Baseball ===
George Stallings, the manager of the Philadelphia Phillies of the National League (NL), noticed Flick while he played for Dayton. Stallings signed Flick to the Phillies to serve as a reserve outfielder for the team in the 1898 season. Starting outfielder Sam Thompson injured his back after six games, forcing Stallings to play Flick. In his debut game, Flick went 2-for-3 with two singles against Fred Klobedanz. Thompson returned to the team briefly, but reinjured his back and announced his retirement in May, allowing Flick to play regularly. Flick proved himself a capable big leaguer, batting .302 with eight home runs, 13 triples and 81 runs batted in (RBIs). In the 1899 season, he batted .342, with 98 runs scored and 98 RBIs. However, he suffered a serious knee injury in August, and reinjured the knee when he returned to the game too quickly.

Before the 1900 season, Philadelphia stars Napoleon Lajoie and Ed Delahanty held out of renewing their contracts with the team. Other members of the team had grown disgruntled. Amid talk of a revival of the American Association, Flick and several other players began to talk about not returning to the team the next year. The Philadelphia Inquirer reported that Flick's father was in the chair business in Cleveland and that he might require Flick's help with the business. Flick agreed to a contract extension before the season started.

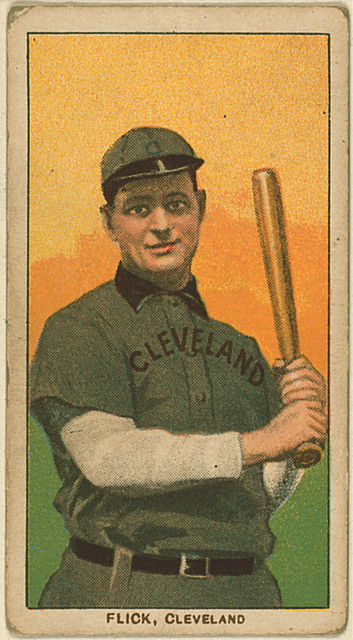
A baseball card of Flick as a member of the Cleveland Naps in 1909.

That year, he led the NL with 110 RBIs. He finished second in the NL with a .367 batting average, a .545 slugging percentage, 11 home runs, 59 extra-base hits, and 297 total bases. He also engaged in a fistfight with Lajoie that caused Lajoie to miss five weeks due to a broken thumb. The race for the batting title came down to the end of the season. The title winner, Honus Wagner, later said, "I've had a lot of thrills, but don't think I was ever happier than in 1900 when I won after battling Elmer Flick to the last day of the season for the title."

Flick was one of many star NL players who jumped to the fledgling American League (AL) after the 1901 season, playing for the crosstown Philadelphia Athletics. Flick played in 11 games for the Athletics, before the Phillies obtained an injunction from the Pennsylvania Supreme Court prohibiting any player under contract with the Phillies from playing for another team. Though this injunction named Lajoie, Bill Bernhard, and Chick Fraser only, it still applied to Flick as well. As a recourse, Flick and teammate Lajoie signed instead with the Cleveland Naps, as the Pennsylvania injunction could not be enforced in Ohio. The two players often traveled separately from their teammates for the next year, never setting foot in Pennsylvania in order to avoid a subpoena. Flick spent the remainder of his career in Cleveland, and the contract dispute was resolved when the leagues made peace in September 1903 with the National Agreement.

On July 6, 1902, Flick hit three triples in one game. Between 1900 and 2010, 49 players accomplished that feat. By early 1904, Flick did not want to re-sign with Cleveland for the offered $2,500 ($87,491 in current dollar terms). Plans were being made to run a railroad through a corner of Flick's farm and Flick hoped to hire some of his horses to the construction team. "After July 4, my farm work will be along so that I will be able to give considerable attention to independent ball", he said.

Flick did return to Cleveland for the 1904 season. That year, Flick tied teammate Harry Bay for the league lead with 38 stolen bases. Flick was the AL batting champion in the 1905 season with a .308 average. Only Carl Yastrzemski, who won the batting title with a .301 average in the 1968 season, led the league with a lower average. Flick also led the league with a .462 slugging percentage and 18 triples in 1905. His .383 on-base percentage trailed only Topsy Hartsel. During a 1905 game, Cleveland fielders were charged with seven errors in a single inning, but Flick committed only one of the errors.

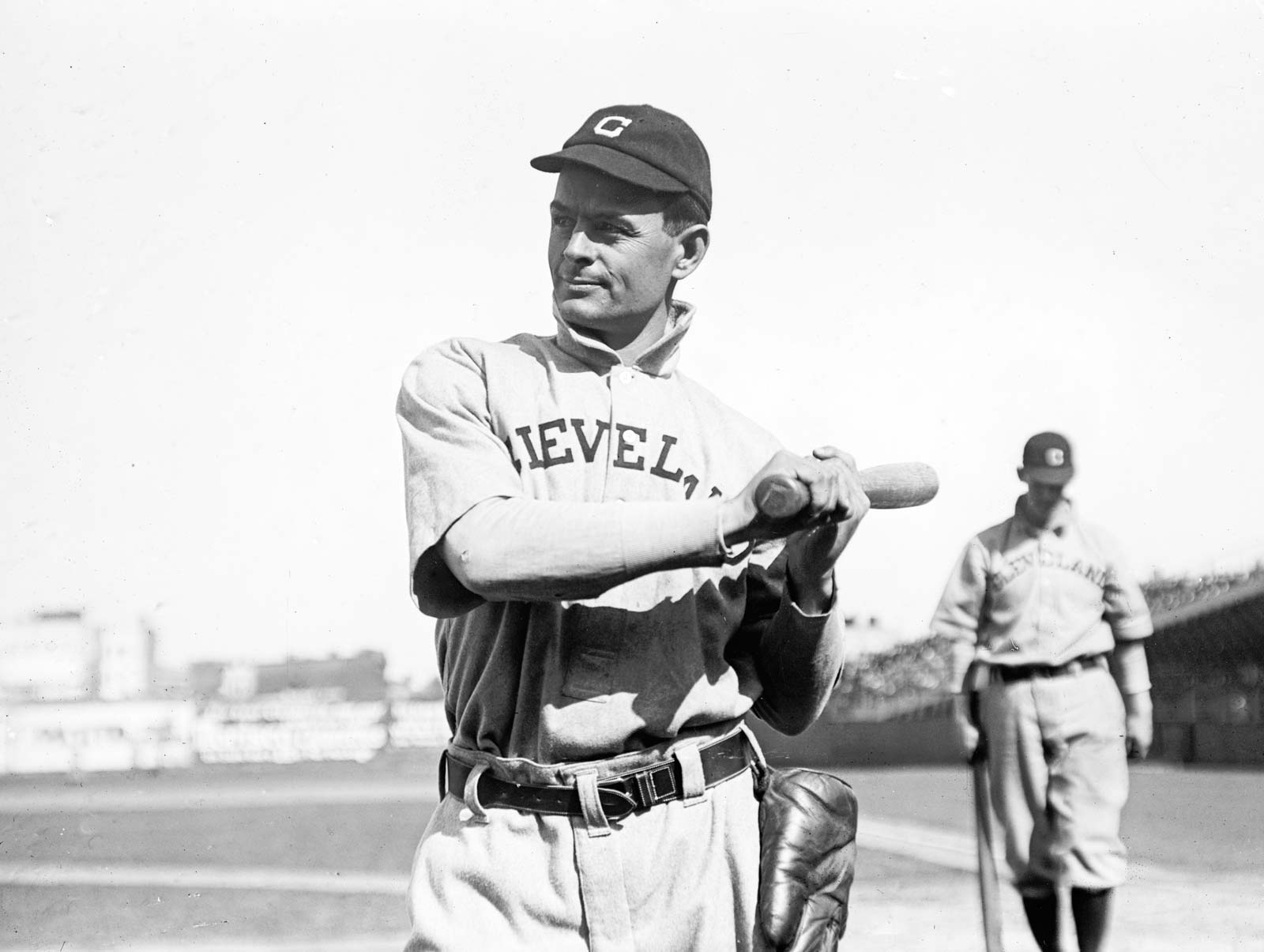
Elmer Flick in 1910

In the 1906 season, Flick played a league-leading 157 games. He led the league with 700 plate appearances, 624 at-bats, 98 runs scored, 22 triples, and 39 stolen bases (tied with John Anderson). However, Flick was "said to be dissatisfied with the team", and the Naps considered trading him to the Detroit Tigers for Matty McIntyre. Before the 1907 season, the Naps turned down a trade with the Tigers which would have exchanged Flick for the 21-year-old Ty Cobb. Hughie Jennings, the Tigers' manager, was tired of dealing with Cobb's abrasive behavior. The Naps refused to part with Flick, even in exchange for Cobb. They countered with Bunk Congalton, but the Tigers declined. Flick had been holding out but he signed a few days after the proposed trade. After Cobb was nearly traded away, Jennings attempted to repair the difficult relationships between Cobb and the other Detroit players. "Cobb is too good a hitter to let get away, when a little diplomacy will get the boys together", Jennings said. In the 1907 season, Flick again led the league with 18 triples.

However, baseball took its toll on Flick. Before the 1907 season, he considered retiring to pursue other business opportunities. By 1908, he developed stomach problems. Cleveland personnel initially said that the illness was related to Flick's overeating. He left training camp that year, complaining of "train sickness", and returned home to Cleveland. He missed the majority of the 1908 season, playing in only nine games. He missed the beginning of the 1909 season as well, as a doctor recommended Flick have his appendix removed. Now weighing 130 pounds (59 kg), Flick was afraid of a bad outcome from the surgery, which was a significant risk at the time. He kept his appendix and played in 66 games, batting .255. He played in another 24 games in the 1910 season before he was again sidelined by his stomach ailment.

The Naps acquired Shoeless Joe Jackson from the Athletics in a trade and had him replace Flick in the lineup. In July 1910, the Naps sold Flick to the Kansas City Blues of the American Association, but Flick refused to report to Kansas City, which cancelled the transaction.

=== Later career ===
In 1911, Flick looked to continue his career. Unable to find a major league team willing to sign him, he returned to the minor leagues. The Toledo Mud Hens of the American Association purchased him from Cleveland. Flick played for Toledo in 1911 and 1912. He batted .326 in the 1911 season and .262 in the 1912 season, but did not hit for power. The Mud Hens released him at the end of the 1912 season. He retired from professional baseball after being released by Toledo, though he briefly played as a second baseman for a local amateur team in Bedford in 1914.

Flick retired without playing in a World Series.

== Later life ==
Returning to Bedford, Flick hunted, raised horses, built buildings, and became involved in selling real estate. He also scouted for Cleveland. Only four 19th-century baseball players, including Flick, were still alive in 1970. In his later years, Flick still answered requests for autographs from his fans. Proud of his longevity, Flick often completed autographs by writing the date and his age above or underneath his signature.

Flick was married to Rosa Ella (née Gates). The couple had five daughters. Flick died of congestive heart failure on January 9, 1971, two days before his 95th birthday, in his hometown of Bedford. He had also suffered from mycosis fungoides.

== Honors ==
When Cobb died in 1961, stories written about him mentioned the attempted trade between Cleveland and Detroit, which revived interest in Flick. Flick was inducted into the Baseball Hall of Fame in 1963 after being unanimously elected by the Veterans Committee (VC). When he received the call from Branch Rickey that he had been selected, Flick did not believe Rickey at first. He said that he did not even realize that he was being considered for election at the time. Flick's family had to convince him that the call was real. He was the oldest living inductee in Hall of Fame history. At his induction, the 87-year-old Flick said, "This is a bigger day than I've ever had before. I'm not going to find the words to explain how I feel."

Subsequent to his induction, writers have questioned the validity of Flick's Hall of Fame membership. James Vail characterized Flick and three other Hall of Famers as "some of the most dubious VC choices ever". David Fleitz wrote that Rickey's influence on the Veterans Committee led to Flick's election, as Rickey was the only committee member who had seen Flick play. Author Robert E. Kelly pointed out that Flick's career was relatively short and that stronger candidates from Flick's era (such as Sherry Magee) had not been inducted.

Flick was enshrined in the Greater Cleveland Sports Hall of Fame in 1977, and the Ohio Baseball Hall of Fame in 1987. A statue of Flick's likeness was created to be placed in Bedford; it was funded by donations and was ultimately dedicated in September 2013. Mike Hargrove was among the baseball figures who attended the dedication ceremony.

== See also ==
- List of Major League Baseball career triples leaders
- List of Major League Baseball career stolen bases leaders
- List of Major League Baseball batting champions
- List of Major League Baseball annual runs batted in leaders
- List of Major League Baseball annual runs scored leaders
- List of Major League Baseball annual stolen base leaders
- List of Major League Baseball annual triples leaders
