= 1898 Cincinnati Reds season =

1898 Cincinnati Reds
- League: National League
- Ballpark: League Park
- City: Cincinnati
- Record: 92–60 (.605)
- League place: 3rd
- Owners: John T. Brush
- Managers: Buck Ewing

The 1898 Cincinnati Reds season was a season in American baseball. The team finished in third place in the National League with a record of 92–60, 11.5 games behind the Boston Beaneaters.

== Regular season ==
The Cincinnati Reds came into the 1898 season with high hopes, and hoping not to have a late season collapse, which had happened the previous three seasons.

The club retained manager Buck Ewing for a fourth season, and made a few player changes in the off-season. Cincinnati was involved in a seven player trade with the Pittsburgh Pirates, as the Reds sent Bill Gray, Jack McCarthy, Billy Rhines, Pop Schriver and Ace Stewart to the Pirates for Pink Hawley, Mike Smith and $1,500. Hawley had a record of 18–18 with Pittsburgh in 1897, posting an ERA of 4.80. His best season was in 1895 with the Pirates, as he was 31–22 with a 3.18 ERA in a National League high 56 games pitched. Smith batted .310 with six home runs and 54 RBI with the Pirates in 1897. He also previously played for the Reds when they were members of the American Association, as he saw limited playing time in Cincinnati from 1886 to 1889. The Reds also acquired Algie McBride, who spent the 1897 season with the St. Paul Saints of the Western League, hitting .381 there. McBride had previous major league experience, appearing in nine games with the Chicago Colts in 1896.

Jake Beckley led the offense, as he hit a solid .294 with a team high four home runs, while earning 72 RBI. Tommy Corcoran led the club with 87 RBI, while Mike Smith hit a team best .342, as well as hitting one home run and driving in 66 runners.

On the mound, Hawley was very solid, going 27–11 with a 3.37 ERA in 43 games pitched. Ted Breitenstein cracked the 20 win plateau, as he was 20–14 with a 3.42 ERA. Frank Dwyer and Bill Dammann each went 16–10.

=== Season summary ===
The Reds got off to a great start, as they posted a record of 18–4 in their first twenty-two games, three games ahead of the second place Cleveland Spiders. Cincinnati remained hot, as their record improved to 27–7, and took a four-game lead over the Spiders, however, a 7–12 slump in their next nineteen games saw their lead dwindle down to one game over the second place Boston Beaneaters.

The Reds held on to first place, as they got hot once again, and took a five-game lead over the Beaneaters with a 65–32 record during the first week of August. The team then fell into a 2–8 slump over their next ten games and found themselves in second place, 3.5 games behind Boston. Cincinnati regained first place, and hung on to it going into the start of September, with a 78–44 record, but a 2–9 mark during their next eleven games saw the Reds fall out of first place for good, as they fell into third, 6.5 games behind the Beaneaters. Cincinnati finished out the season in third place with a 92–60 record, 11.5 games behind Boston.

=== Season standings ===
National League
Team	W	L	Pct.	GB	Home	Road
Boston Beaneaters	102	47	.685	—	62‍–‍15	40‍–‍32
Baltimore Orioles	96	53	.644	6	58‍–‍15	38‍–‍38
Cincinnati Reds	92	60	.605	11½	58‍–‍28	34‍–‍32
Chicago Orphans	85	65	.567	17½	58‍–‍31	27‍–‍34
Cleveland Spiders	81	68	.544	21	36‍–‍19	45‍–‍49
Philadelphia Phillies	78	71	.523	24	49‍–‍31	29‍–‍40
New York Giants	77	73	.513	25½	45‍–‍28	32‍–‍45
Pittsburgh Pirates	72	76	.486	29½	39‍–‍35	33‍–‍41
Louisville Colonels	70	81	.464	33	43‍–‍34	27‍–‍47
Brooklyn Bridegrooms	54	91	.372	46	30‍–‍41	24‍–‍50
Washington Senators	51	101	.336	52½	34‍–‍44	17‍–‍57
St. Louis Browns	39	111	.260	63½	20‍–‍44	19‍–‍67

=== Record vs. opponents ===
1898 National League record Sources:
Team	BAL	BSN	BRO	CHI	CIN	CLE	LOU	NYG	PHI	PIT	STL	WAS
Baltimore	—	5–7	8–5–1	9–5	8–6–1	8–6–1	9–5	10–3–1	10–3–1	10–4	12–2	7–7
Boston	7–5	—	11–2	9–5	9–4–1	6–7–1	8–6–1	10–4	10–4	9–5	12–2	11–3
Brooklyn	5–8–1	2–11	—	4–10	3–11	6–7	2–10–1	3–11	6–6	9–5–1	7–6–1	7–6
Chicago	5–9	5–9	10–4	—	6–8	7–7	9–5	9–5–1	6–7	7–4–1	10–4	11–3
Cincinnati	6–8–1	4–9–1	11–3	8–6	—	8–5–2	9–5	6–8–1	7–7	12–2	12–2	9–5
Cleveland	6–8–1	7–6–1	7–6	7–7	5–8–2	—	9–5	6–8	7–7	5–8	10–3–1	12–2–2
Louisville	5–9	6–8–1	10–2–1	5–9	5–9	5–9	—	6–8	4–10	4–9–1	10–4	10–4
New York	3–10–1	4–10	11–3	5–9–1	8–6–1	8–6	8–6	—	6–7	5–9–1	10–3–2	9–4–1
Philadelphia	3–10–1	4–10	6–6	7–6	7–7	7–7	10–4	7–6	—	6–8	9–5	12–2
Pittsburgh	4–10	5–9	5–9–1	4–7–1	2–12	8–5	9–4–1	9–5–1	8–6	—	9–4	9–5
St. Louis	2–12	2–12	6–7–1	4–10	2–12	3–10–1	4–10	3–10–2	5–9	4–9	—	4–10
Washington	7–7	3–11	6–7	3–11	5–9	2–12–2	4–10	4–9–1	2–12	5–9	10–4	—

=== Game log ===
Legend
Reds Win	Reds Loss	Game Tied/Postponed

1898 Game Log: 92–60 (Home: 58–28; Away: 34–32)
April: 9–2 (Home: 7–2; Away: 2–0)

#	Date	Opponent	Score	Stadium	Attendance	Record	Streak
1	April 15	Spiders	3–2	League Park	11,000	1-0	W1
2	April 16	Spiders	1–3	League Park	5,641	1-1	L1
3	April 17	Spiders	12–1	League Park	15,504	2-1	W1
-	April 20	Pirates	Postponed (cold); Makeup: April 21				
4	April 21	Pirates	11–6	League Park	3,000	3-1	W2
5	April 22	Pirates	11–0	League Park	2,467	4-1	W3
-	April 23	Pirates	Postponed (rain); Makeup: August 28				
-	April 24	Orphans	Postponed (rain); Makeup: July 10				
6	April 25	Orphans	4–7	League Park	500	4-2	L1
7	April 26	Orphans	3–2	League Park	2,396	5-2	W1
8	April 27	Orphans	5–3	League Park	2,400	6-2	W2
9	April 28	Spiders	5–3	League Park	1,900	7-2	W3
10	April 29	@ Pirates	5–2	Exposition Park	4,200	8-2	W4
11	April 30	@ Pirates	11–2	Exposition Park	4,500	9-2	W5

May: 18–5 (Home: 13–5; Away: 5–0)

#	Date	Opponent	Score	Stadium	Attendance	Record	Streak
12	May 1	Pirates	5–11	League Park	14,000	9-3	L1
13	May 2	@ Pirates	7–3	Exposition Park	800	10-3	W1
14	May 3	@ Pirates	5–2	Exposition Park	2,000	11-3	W2
-	May 4	Browns	Postponed (rain, site change); Makeup: June 28				
-	May 5	Browns	Postponed (rain, site change); Makeup: June 28				
-	May 6	Browns	Postponed (rain); Makeup: July 3				
-	May 7	Browns	Postponed (rain); Makeup: October 1				
15	May 8	Colonels	7–1	League Park	10,000	12-3	W3
-	May 9	@ Browns	Postponed (site change); Makeup: May 9				
16	May 9	Browns	5–6	League Park	1,900	12-4	L1
-	May 10	@ Browns	Postponed (rain, site change); Makeup: May 12				
-	May 11	@ Browns	Postponed (site change); Makeup: May 11				
17	May 11	Browns	2–1	League Park	4,000	13-4	W1
-	May 12	@ Browns	Postponed (site change); Makeup: May 12				
18	May 12 1	Browns	8–5	League Park	N/A	14-4	W2
19	May 12 2	Browns	3–2	League Park	3,200	15-4	W3
20	May 14	Colonels	7–1	League Park	2,500	16-4	W4
21	May 15	Colonels	4–3	League Park	6,800	17-4	W5
22	May 19	Beaneaters	5–4	League Park	4,804	18-4	W6
23	May 20	Beaneaters	4–5	League Park	3,100	18-5	L1
24	May 21	Beaneaters	3–4	League Park	4,600	18-6	L2
25	May 22	Pirates	2–0	League Park	6,500	19-6	W1
26	May 23	Bridegrooms	7–2	League Park	1,900	20-6	W2
27	May 24	Bridegrooms	3–6	League Park	1,925	20-7	L1
28	May 25	Bridegrooms	5–4	League Park	1,750	21-7	W1
29	May 26	Giants	12–6	League Park	2,450	22-7	W2
30	May 27	Giants	13–4	League Park	3,340	23-7	W3
31	May 28	Giants	11–7	League Park	3,500	24-7	W4
32	May 30 1	@ Bridegrooms	6–4	Washington Park	3,900	25-7	W5
33	May 30 2	@ Bridegrooms	3–2	Washington Park	5,000	26-7	W6
34	May 31	@ Bridegrooms	7–2	Washington Park	1,500	27-7	W7

June: 13–16 (Home: 4–6; Away: 9–10)

#	Date	Opponent	Score	Stadium	Attendance	Record	Streak
35	June 1	@ Bridegrooms	3–4	Washington Park	1,500	27-8	L1
36	June 2	@ Giants	0–3	Polo Grounds	4,000	27-9	L2
37	June 3	@ Giants	10–16	Polo Grounds	3,000	27-10	L3
38	June 4	@ Giants	5–3	Polo Grounds	10,000	28-10	W1
39	June 6	@ Giants	10–1	Polo Grounds	3,000	29-10	W2
40	June 7	@ Beaneaters	2–9	South End Grounds	3,500	29-11	L1
41	June 8	@ Beaneaters	1–10	South End Grounds	3,500	29-12	L2
42	June 9	@ Beaneaters	5–6	South End Grounds	2,800	29-13	L3
43	June 10	@ Beaneaters	4–3	South End Grounds	3,500	30-13	W1
44	June 12	@ Colonels	4–5	Eclipse Park	4,000	30-14	L1
45	June 13	@ Colonels	6–4	Eclipse Park	400	31-14	W1
46	June 14	@ Colonels	7–3	Eclipse Park	1,000	32-14	W2
47	June 15	@ Colonels	5–1	Eclipse Park	300	33-14	W3
48	June 16	@ Orphans	1–9	West Side Park	3,900	33-15	L1
49	June 17	@ Orphans	2–1	West Side Park	5,300	34-15	W1
50	June 18	@ Orphans	4–10	West Side Park	9,700	34-16	L1
51	June 19	@ Orphans	1–10	West Side Park	22,400	34-17	L2
52	June 20	Orioles	2–17	League Park	3,060	34-18	L3
53	June 21	Orioles	2–4	League Park	2,200	34-19	L4
54	June 22	Orioles	3–2	League Park	2,200	35-19	W1
55	June 23	Orioles	13–4	League Park	2,350	36-19	W2
56	June 24	Senators	8–10	League Park	1,600	36-20	L1
57	June 25	Senators	8–5	League Park	3,100	37-20	W1
58	June 26	Senators	4–13	League Park	5,634	37-21	L1
59	June 27	Senators	2–9	League Park	600	37-22	L2
60	June 28 1	@ Browns	3–2	New Sportsman's Park	N/A	38-22	W1
61	June 28 2	@ Browns	5–0	New Sportsman's Park	2,500	39-22	W2
62	June 29	Phillies	9–8	League Park	2,800	40-22	W3
63	June 30	Phillies	3–17	League Park	1,800	40-23	L1

July: 22–6 (Home: 12–0; Away: 10–6)

#	Date	Opponent	Score	Stadium	Attendance	Record	Streak
64	July 1	Phillies	14–2	League Park	2,200	41-23	W1
65	July 2	Phillies	8–4	League Park	2,600	42-23	W2
66	July 3 1	Browns	7–5	League Park	N/A	43-23	W3
67	July 3 2	Browns	10–7	League Park	8,204	44-23	W4
68	July 4 1	Colonels	9–4	League Park	5,200	45-23	W5
69	July 4 2	Colonels	11–0	League Park	5,612	46-23	W6
70	July 7	@ Orphans	7–5	West Side Park	2,900	47-23	W7
71	July 8	@ Orphans	11–8	West Side Park	2,400	48-23	W8
72	July 9	@ Orphans	3–5	West Side Park	6,800	48-24	L1
73	July 10	Orphans	11–7	League Park	7,852	49-24	W1
74	July 11	@ Orioles	4–6	Union Park	2,814	49-25	L1
75	July 12	@ Orioles	10–5	Union Park	2,327	50-25	W1
76	July 13	@ Orioles	11–6	Union Park	1,952	51-25	W2
77	July 14	@ Orioles	5–5	Union Park	1,278	51-25	W2
78	July 15	@ Phillies	3–7	National League Park	3,412	51-26	L1
79	July 16	@ Phillies	2–6	National League Park	8,288	51-27	L2
80	July 18	@ Phillies	5–4	National League Park	3,873	52-27	W1
-	July 19	@ Phillies	Postponed (rain); Makeup: September 19				
81	July 20	@ Senators	2–3	Boundary Field	1,000	52-28	L1
82	July 21 1	@ Senators	12–6	Boundary Field	N/A	53-28	W1
83	July 21 2	@ Senators	7–4	Boundary Field	2,000	54-28	W2
84	July 22	@ Senators	5–1	Boundary Field	800	55-28	W3
85	July 23	@ Pirates	3–2	Exposition Park	2,500	56-28	W4
86	July 24	Pirates	6–5	League Park	7,203	57-28	W5
-	July 25	@ Pirates	Postponed (rain); Makeup: July 26				
87	July 26 1	@ Pirates	6–3	Exposition Park	N/A	58-28	W6
88	July 26 2	@ Pirates	2–3	Exposition Park	4,000	58-29	L1
89	July 28	Bridegrooms	7–1	League Park	1,773	59-29	W1
90	July 29	Bridegrooms	6–5	League Park	2,400	60-29	W2
91	July 30	Bridegrooms	8–2	League Park	3,350	61-29	W3
92	July 31	Bridegrooms	9–5	League Park	6,616	62-29	W4

August: 11–14 (Home: 8–9; Away: 3–5)

#	Date	Opponent	Score	Stadium	Attendance	Record	Streak
93	August 2	Giants	5–7	League Park	3,350	62-30	L1
-	August 3	Giants	Postponed (rain); Makeup: August 4				
94	August 4 1	Giants	5–6	League Park	N/A	62-31	L2
95	August 4 2	Giants	5–5	League Park	4,703	62-31	L2
96	August 5 1	Giants	5–9	League Park	N/A	62-32	L3
97	August 5 2	Giants	9–1	League Park	4,585	63-32	W1
98	August 6	Beaneaters	2–1	League Park	6,650	64-32	W2
99	August 7	Beaneaters	4–1	League Park	12,400	65-32	W3
-	August 8	Beaneaters	Postponed (rain); Makeup: August 10				
100	August 9	Beaneaters	0–8	League Park	6,000	65-33	L1
101	August 10 1	Beaneaters	4–7	League Park	N/A	65-34	L2
102	August 10 2	Beaneaters	5–6	League Park	N/A	65-35	L3
103	August 12	@ Bridegrooms	4–3	Washington Park	500	66-35	W1
104	August 13	@ Bridegrooms	1–2	Washington Park	2,300	66-36	L1
105	August 15	@ Bridegrooms	8–0	Washington Park	1,500	67-36	W1
106	August 16	@ Giants	0–4	Polo Grounds	3,000	67-37	L1
107	August 17	@ Giants	1–3	Polo Grounds	3,000	67-38	L2
108	August 18	@ Giants	0–7	Polo Grounds	3,000	67-39	L3
-	August 19	@ Beaneaters	Postponed (rain); Makeup: August 22				
109	August 20	@ Beaneaters	1–2	South End Grounds	10,000	67-40	L4
110	August 22 1	@ Beaneaters	7–2	South End Grounds	N/A	68-40	W1
111	August 22 2	@ Beaneaters	5–5	South End Grounds	12,000	68-40	W1
-	August 24	Orioles	Postponed (rain); Makeup: August 26				
112	August 25	Orioles	1–14	League Park	2,650	68-41	L1
113	August 26	Orioles	10–0	League Park	2,044	69-41	W1
114	August 27	Phillies	3–2	League Park	3,000	70-41	W2
115	August 28 1	Pirates	9–4	League Park	N/A	71-41	W3
116	August 28 2	Pirates	6–5	League Park	15,904	72-41	W4
117	August 29	Phillies	7–8	League Park	1,800	72-42	L1
118	August 30	Phillies	1–9	League Park	1,200	72-43	L2
119	August 31	Senators	9–5	League Park	900	73-43	W1

September: 12–14 (Home: 8–5; Away: 4–9)

#	Date	Opponent	Score	Stadium	Attendance	Record	Streak
120	September 1	Senators	5–4	League Park	1,125	74-43	W2
121	September 3	Senators	4–2	League Park	2,275	75-43	W3
122	September 4	Spiders	2–0	League Park	8,700	76-43	W4
123	September 5 1	Spiders	6–8	League Park	N/A	76-44	L1
124	September 5 2	Spiders	1–0	League Park	11,098	77-44	W1
125	September 6	Orphans	9–8	League Park	7,800	78-44	W2
126	September 7	Orphans	2–13	League Park	7,200	78-45	L1
-	September 8	Orphans	Postponed (Grand Army of the Republic parade); Makeup: September 9				
-	September 9	Browns	Postponed (schedule change); Makeup: October 1				
127	September 9	Orphans	6–4	League Park	3,405	79-45	W1
128	September 10	Colonels	1–3	League Park	3,500	79-46	L1
129	September 11	Colonels	5–9	League Park	4,500	79-47	L2
130	September 14	@ Orioles	1–3	Union Park	2,316	79-48	L3
131	September 15 1	@ Orioles	1–15	Union Park	N/A	79-49	L4
132	September 15 2	@ Orioles	3–6	Union Park	N/A	79-50	L5
133	September 16	@ Orioles	2–3	Union Park	2,063	79-51	L6
134	September 17	@ Phillies	10–9	National League Park	4,358	80-51	W1
135	September 19 1	@ Phillies	0–8	National League Park	N/A	80-52	L1
136	September 19 2	@ Phillies	1–9	National League Park	4,300	80-53	L2
137	September 20	@ Phillies	7–5	National League Park	1,703	81-53	W1
138	September 21	@ Senators	15–3	Boundary Field	800	82-53	W2
-	September 22	@ Senators	Postponed (rain); Makeup: September 23				
139	September 23 1	@ Senators	1–3	Boundary Field	N/A	82-54	L1
140	September 23 2	@ Senators	10–6	Boundary Field	1,800	83-54	W1
-	September 24	@ Spiders	Postponed (site change); Makeup: April 28				
-	September 25	@ Spiders	Postponed (site change); Makeup: September 25				
141	September 25 1	Spiders	5–4	League Park	N/A	84-54	W2
142	September 25 2	Spiders	2–2	League Park	6,800	84-54	W2
-	September 26	@ Spiders	Postponed (site change); Makeup: September 26				
143	September 26	Spiders	3–4	League Park	1,200	84-55	L1
-	September 27	@ Spiders	Postponed (site change); Makeup: September 27				
144	September 27	Spiders	9–2	League Park	1,200	85-55	W1
145	September 28	@ Spiders	1–4	New Sportsman's Park	3,000	85-56	L1
146	September 29	@ Spiders	2–7	New Sportsman's Park	2,000	85-57	L2

October: 7–3 (Home: 6–1; Away: 1–2)

#	Date	Opponent	Score	Stadium	Attendance	Record	Streak
147	October 1 1	Browns	4–3	League Park	N/A	86-57	W1
148	October 1 2	Browns	3–7	League Park	1,248	86-58	L1
149	October 2 1	Browns	6–2	League Park	N/A	87-58	W1
150	October 2 2	Browns	4–0	League Park	2,744	88-58	W2
-	October 3	@ Spiders	Postponed (site change); Makeup: September 25				
151	October 3 1	Browns	8–0	League Park	N/A	89-58	W3
152	October 3 2	Browns	7–5	League Park	600	90-58	W4
-	October 4	@ Spiders	Postponed (site change, played at New Sportsman's Park); Makeup: September 28				
-	October 5	@ Spiders	Postponed (site change, played at New Sportsman's Park); Makeup: September 29				
153	October 9 1	Spiders	12–5	League Park	N/A	91-58	W5
154	October 9 2	Spiders	6–6	League Park	4,880	91-58	W5
155	October 10	@ Colonels	3–6	Eclipse Park	1,000	91-59	L1
-	October 11	@ Colonels	Postponed (rain); Makeup: October 12				
156	October 12 1	@ Colonels	5–2	Eclipse Park	N/A	92-59	W1
157	October 12 2	@ Colonels	1–4	Eclipse Park	2,877	92-60	L1
-	October 13	@ Browns	Postponed (site change); Makeup: October 2				
-	October 14	@ Browns	Postponed (site change); Makeup: October 3				
-	October 15	@ Browns	Postponed (site change); Makeup: October 3				

=== Roster ===
1898 Cincinnati Reds
Roster
Pitchers: Ted Breitenstein; Percy Coleman; Bill Dammann; Frank Dwyer; Jot Goar; Pink Hawley; Bill Hill	Catchers: Heinie Peitz; Bob Wood; Infielders: Jake Beckley; Tommy Corcoran; Charlie Irwin; Bid McPhee; Harry Steinfeldt; Farmer Vaughn	Outfielders: Bug Holliday; Algie McBride; Herm McFarland; Dusty Miller; Mike Smith	Manager: Buck Ewing

== Player stats ==
=== Batting ===
==== Starters by position ====
Note: Pos = Position; G = Games played; AB = At bats; H = Hits; Avg. = Batting average; HR = Home runs; RBI = Runs batted in

Pos	Player	G	AB	H	Avg.	HR	RBI
C	Heinie Peitz	105	330	90	.273	1	43
1B	Jake Beckley	118	459	135	.294	4	72
2B	Bid McPhee	133	486	121	.249	1	60
SS	Tommy Corcoran	153	619	155	.250	2	87
3B	Charlie Irwin	136	501	120	.240	3	55
OF	Algie McBride	120	486	147	.302	2	43
OF	Dusty Miller	152	586	175	.299	3	90
OF	Mike Smith	123	486	166	.342	1	66

==== Other batters ====
Note: G = Games played; AB = At bats; H = Hits; Avg. = Batting average; HR = Home runs; RBI = Runs batted in

Player	G	AB	H	Avg.	HR	RBI
Harry Steinfeldt	88	308	91	.295	0	43
Farmer Vaughn	78	275	84	.305	1	46
Bob Wood	39	109	30	.275	0	16
Bug Holliday	30	106	25	.236	0	7
Herm McFarland	19	64	18	.281	0	11

=== Pitching ===
==== Starting pitchers ====
Note: G = Games pitched; IP = Innings pitched; W = Wins; L = Losses; ERA = Earned run average; SO = Strikeouts

Player	G	IP	W	L	ERA	SO
Pink Hawley	43	331.0	27	11	3.37	69
Ted Breitenstein	39	315.2	20	14	3.42	68
Bill Hill	33	262.0	13	14	3.98	75
Frank Dwyer	31	240.0	16	10	3.04	29
Percy Coleman	1	9.0	0	1	3.00	2

==== Other pitchers ====
Note: G = Games pitched; IP = Innings pitched; W = Wins; L = Losses; ERA = Earned run average; SO = Strikeouts

Player	G	IP	W	L	ERA	SO
Bill Dammann	35	224.2	16	10	3.61	51

==== Relief pitchers ====
Note: G = Games pitched; W = Wins; L = Losses; SV = Saves; ERA = Earned run average; SO = Strikeouts

Player	G	W	L	SV	ERA	SO
Jot Goar	1	0	0	0	9.00	0
Mike Smith	1	0	0	0	18.00	0
