= 1898 Pittsburgh Pirates season =

1898 Pittsburgh Pirates
- League: National League
- Ballpark: Exposition Park
- City: Allegheny, Pennsylvania
- Record: 72–76 (.486)
- League place: 8th
- Owners: William Kerr and Phil Auten
- Managers: Bill Watkins

The 1898 Pittsburgh (Note: Until early in the 20th century, the name of Pittsburgh was spelled both with and without the final 'h'.) Pirates season was the 17th season of the Pittsburgh Pirates franchise; their 12th in the National League. The Pirates finished eighth in the National League with a record of 72–76.

== Regular season ==
=== Season standings ===
National League
Team	W	L	Pct.	GB	Home	Road
Boston Beaneaters	102	47	.685	—	62‍–‍15	40‍–‍32
Baltimore Orioles	96	53	.644	6	58‍–‍15	38‍–‍38
Cincinnati Reds	92	60	.605	11½	58‍–‍28	34‍–‍32
Chicago Orphans	85	65	.567	17½	58‍–‍31	27‍–‍34
Cleveland Spiders	81	68	.544	21	36‍–‍19	45‍–‍49
Philadelphia Phillies	78	71	.523	24	49‍–‍31	29‍–‍40
New York Giants	77	73	.513	25½	45‍–‍28	32‍–‍45
Pittsburgh Pirates	72	76	.486	29½	39‍–‍35	33‍–‍41
Louisville Colonels	70	81	.464	33	43‍–‍34	27‍–‍47
Brooklyn Bridegrooms	54	91	.372	46	30‍–‍41	24‍–‍50
Washington Senators	51	101	.336	52½	34‍–‍44	17‍–‍57
St. Louis Browns	39	111	.260	63½	20‍–‍44	19‍–‍67

=== Record vs. opponents ===
1898 National League record Sources:
Team	BAL	BSN	BRO	CHI	CIN	CLE	LOU	NYG	PHI	PIT	STL	WAS
Baltimore	—	5–7	8–5–1	9–5	8–6–1	8–6–1	9–5	10–3–1	10–3–1	10–4	12–2	7–7
Boston	7–5	—	11–2	9–5	9–4–1	6–7–1	8–6–1	10–4	10–4	9–5	12–2	11–3
Brooklyn	5–8–1	2–11	—	4–10	3–11	6–7	2–10–1	3–11	6–6	9–5–1	7–6–1	7–6
Chicago	5–9	5–9	10–4	—	6–8	7–7	9–5	9–5–1	6–7	7–4–1	10–4	11–3
Cincinnati	6–8–1	4–9–1	11–3	8–6	—	8–5–2	9–5	6–8–1	7–7	12–2	12–2	9–5
Cleveland	6–8–1	7–6–1	7–6	7–7	5–8–2	—	9–5	6–8	7–7	5–8	10–3–1	12–2–2
Louisville	5–9	6–8–1	10–2–1	5–9	5–9	5–9	—	6–8	4–10	4–9–1	10–4	10–4
New York	3–10–1	4–10	11–3	5–9–1	8–6–1	8–6	8–6	—	6–7	5–9–1	10–3–2	9–4–1
Philadelphia	3–10–1	4–10	6–6	7–6	7–7	7–7	10–4	7–6	—	6–8	9–5	12–2
Pittsburgh	4–10	5–9	5–9–1	4–7–1	2–12	8–5	9–4–1	9–5–1	8–6	—	9–4	9–5
St. Louis	2–12	2–12	6–7–1	4–10	2–12	3–10–1	4–10	3–10–2	5–9	4–9	—	4–10
Washington	7–7	3–11	6–7	3–11	5–9	2–12–2	4–10	4–9–1	2–12	5–9	10–4	—

=== Roster ===
1898 Pittsburgh Pirates
Roster
Pitchers: Jack Cronin; Jim Gardner; Bill Hart; Charlie Hastings; Bill Hoffer; Jim Hughey; Frank Killen; Sam Leever; Billy Rhines; Rosie Rosebraugh; Jesse Tannehill	Catchers: Frank Bowerman; Morgan Murphy; Pop Schriver; Infielders: Willie Clark; Harry Davis; Bill Eagan; Bones Ely; John Ganzel; Bill Gray; Fred Lake; Dick Padden	Outfielders: Steve Brodie; Patsy Donovan; Jack McCarthy; Tom McCreery; Tom O'Brien; Joe Rickert; Other batters: Hi Ladd	Manager: Bill Watkins

== Player stats ==
=== Batting ===
==== Starters by position ====
Note: Pos = Position; G = Games played; AB = At bats; H = Hits; Avg. = Batting average; HR = Home runs; RBI = Runs batted in

Pos	Player	G	AB	H	Avg.	HR	RBI
C	Pop Schriver	95	315	72	.229	0	32
1B	Willie Clark	57	209	64	.306	1	31
2B	Dick Padden	128	463	119	.257	2	43
SS	Bones Ely	148	519	110	.212	2	44
3B	Bill Gray	137	528	121	.229	0	67
OF	Tom O'Brien	107	413	107	.259	1	45
OF	Jack McCarthy	137	537	155	.289	4	78
OF	Patsy Donovan	147	610	184	.302	0	37

==== Other batters ====
Note: G = Games played; AB = At bats; H = Hits; Avg. = Batting average; HR = Home runs; RBI = Runs batted in

Player	G	AB	H	Avg.	HR	RBI
Frank Bowerman	69	241	66	.274	0	29
Harry Davis	58	222	65	.293	1	24
Tom McCreery	53	190	59	.311	2	20
Steve Brodie	42	156	41	.263	0	21
Bill Eagan	19	61	20	.328	0	5
John Ganzel	15	45	6	.133	0	2
Morgan Murphy	5	16	2	.125	0	2
Fred Lake	5	13	1	.077	0	1
Joe Rickert	2	6	1	.167	0	0
Hi Ladd	1	1	0	.000	0	0

=== Pitching ===
==== Starting pitchers ====
Note: G = Games pitched; IP = Innings pitched; W = Wins; L = Losses; ERA = Earned run average; SO = Strikeouts

Player	G	IP	W	L	ERA	SO
Jesse Tannehill	43	326.2	25	13	2.95	93
Billy Rhines	31	258.0	12	16	3.52	48
Jim Gardner	25	185.1	10	13	3.21	41
Frank Killen	23	177.2	10	11	3.75	48
Charlie Hastings	19	137.1	4	10	3.41	40
Bill Hart	16	125.0	5	9	4.82	19
Bill Hoffer	4	31.0	3	0	1.74	11
Jack Cronin	4	28.0	2	2	3.54	9

==== Other pitchers ====
Note: G = Games pitched; IP = Innings pitched; W = Wins; L = Losses; ERA = Earned run average; SO = Strikeouts

Player	G	IP	W	L	ERA	SO
Sam Leever	5	33.0	1	0	2.45	15
Rosie Rosebraugh	4	21.2	0	2	3.32	6
