= 1898 Chicago Orphans season =

1898 Chicago Orphans
- League: National League
- Ballpark: West Side Park
- City: Chicago
- Record: 85–65 (.567)
- League place: 4th
- Owners: Albert Spalding
- Managers: Tom Burns

The 1898 Chicago Orphans season was the 27th season of the Chicago Orphans franchise, the 23rd in the National League and the sixth at West Side Park. The Orphans, formerly known as the Colts, finished in fourth place in the National League with a record of 85–65, 17.5 games behind the Boston Beaneaters.

1898 was the first season since 1876 that the team was without manager and first baseman Cap Anson, who had been fired during the offseason. Cap, who was also often called "Pop", was replaced as manager by Tom Burns, who had played for the team from 1880 until 1891, and had managed the Springfield Ponies in 1897. The media, picking up on Anson's absence, began referring to the team as the "Orphans", as they had lost their "Pop".

== Regular season ==
=== Season standings ===
National League
Team	W	L	Pct.	GB	Home	Road
Boston Beaneaters	102	47	.685	—	62‍–‍15	40‍–‍32
Baltimore Orioles	96	53	.644	6	58‍–‍15	38‍–‍38
Cincinnati Reds	92	60	.605	11½	58‍–‍28	34‍–‍32
Chicago Orphans	85	65	.567	17½	58‍–‍31	27‍–‍34
Cleveland Spiders	81	68	.544	21	36‍–‍19	45‍–‍49
Philadelphia Phillies	78	71	.523	24	49‍–‍31	29‍–‍40
New York Giants	77	73	.513	25½	45‍–‍28	32‍–‍45
Pittsburgh Pirates	72	76	.486	29½	39‍–‍35	33‍–‍41
Louisville Colonels	70	81	.464	33	43‍–‍34	27‍–‍47
Brooklyn Bridegrooms	54	91	.372	46	30‍–‍41	24‍–‍50
Washington Senators	51	101	.336	52½	34‍–‍44	17‍–‍57
St. Louis Browns	39	111	.260	63½	20‍–‍44	19‍–‍67

=== Record vs. opponents ===
1898 National League record Sources:
Team	BAL	BSN	BRO	CHI	CIN	CLE	LOU	NYG	PHI	PIT	STL	WAS
Baltimore	—	5–7	8–5–1	9–5	8–6–1	8–6–1	9–5	10–3–1	10–3–1	10–4	12–2	7–7
Boston	7–5	—	11–2	9–5	9–4–1	6–7–1	8–6–1	10–4	10–4	9–5	12–2	11–3
Brooklyn	5–8–1	2–11	—	4–10	3–11	6–7	2–10–1	3–11	6–6	9–5–1	7–6–1	7–6
Chicago	5–9	5–9	10–4	—	6–8	7–7	9–5	9–5–1	6–7	7–4–1	10–4	11–3
Cincinnati	6–8–1	4–9–1	11–3	8–6	—	8–5–2	9–5	6–8–1	7–7	12–2	12–2	9–5
Cleveland	6–8–1	7–6–1	7–6	7–7	5–8–2	—	9–5	6–8	7–7	5–8	10–3–1	12–2–2
Louisville	5–9	6–8–1	10–2–1	5–9	5–9	5–9	—	6–8	4–10	4–9–1	10–4	10–4
New York	3–10–1	4–10	11–3	5–9–1	8–6–1	8–6	8–6	—	6–7	5–9–1	10–3–2	9–4–1
Philadelphia	3–10–1	4–10	6–6	7–6	7–7	7–7	10–4	7–6	—	6–8	9–5	12–2
Pittsburgh	4–10	5–9	5–9–1	4–7–1	2–12	8–5	9–4–1	9–5–1	8–6	—	9–4	9–5
St. Louis	2–12	2–12	6–7–1	4–10	2–12	3–10–1	4–10	3–10–2	5–9	4–9	—	4–10
Washington	7–7	3–11	6–7	3–11	5–9	2–12–2	4–10	4–9–1	2–12	5–9	10–4	—

== Roster ==
1898 Chicago Orphans
Roster
Pitchers: Buttons Briggs; Nixey Callahan; Danny Friend; Clark Griffith; Jack Katoll; Matt Kilroy; Bill Phyle; Jack Taylor; Walt Woods	Catchers: Frank Chance; Tim Donahue; Art Nichols; Infielders: Jim Connor; Bill Dahlen; Bill Everitt; Frank Martin; Barry McCormick; Harry Wolverton	Outfielders: Henry Clarke; Danny Green; Frank Isbell; Bill Lange; Sam Mertes; Jimmy Ryan; Walter Thornton	Manager: Tom Burns

== Player stats ==
=== Batting ===
==== Starters by position ====
Note: Pos = Position; G = Games played; AB = At bats; H = Hits; Avg. = Batting average; HR = Home runs; RBI = Runs batted in

Pos	Player	G	AB	H	Avg.	HR	RBI
C	Tim Donahue	122	396	87	.220	0	39
1B	Bill Everitt	149	596	190	.319	0	69
2B	Jim Connor	138	505	114	.226	0	67
SS	Bill Dahlen	142	521	151	.290	1	79
3B	Barry McCormick	137	530	131	.247	2	78
OF	Jimmy Ryan	144	572	185	.323	4	79
OF	Sam Mertes	83	269	80	.297	1	47
OF	Bill Lange	113	442	141	.319	5	69

==== Other batters ====
Note: G = Games played; AB = At bats; H = Hits; Avg. = Batting average; HR = Home runs; RBI = Runs batted in

Player	G	AB	H	Avg.	HR	RBI
Walter Thornton	62	210	62	.295	0	14
Danny Green	47	188	59	.314	4	27
Frank Isbell	45	159	37	.233	0	8
Frank Chance	53	147	41	.279	1	14
Harry Wolverton	13	49	16	.327	0	2
Art Nichols	14	42	12	.286	0	6
Frank Martin	1	4	0	.000	0	0

=== Pitching ===
==== Starting pitchers ====
Note: G = Games pitched; IP = Innings pitched; W = Wins; L = Losses; ERA = Earned run average; SO = Strikeouts

Player	G	IP	W	L	ERA	SO
Clark Griffith	38	325.2	24	10	1.88	97
Nixey Callahan	31	274.1	20	10	2.46	73
Walter Thornton	28	215.1	13	10	3.34	56
Walt Woods	27	215.0	9	13	3.14	26
Matt Kilroy	13	100.1	6	7	4.31	18
Jack Taylor	5	41.0	5	0	2.20	11
Buttons Briggs	4	30.0	1	3	5.70	14
Bill Phyle	3	23.0	2	1	0.78	4
Danny Friend	2	17.0	0	2	5.29	4
Henry Clarke	1	9.0	1	0	2.00	1

==== Other pitchers ====
Note: G = Games pitched; IP = Innings pitched; W = Wins; L = Losses; ERA = Earned run average; SO = Strikeouts

Player	G	IP	W	L	ERA	SO
Frank Isbell	13	81.0	4	7	3.56	16
Jack Katoll	2	11.0	0	1	0.82	3
