= 1898 Boston Beaneaters season =

1898 Boston Beaneaters
- National League champions
- League: National League
- Ballpark: South End Grounds
- City: Boston, Massachusetts
- Record: 102–47–3 (.685)
- League place: 1st
- Owners: Arthur Soden
- Managers: Frank Selee (9th season)

The 1898 Boston Beaneaters season was the 28th season of the franchise. The Beaneaters had a record of 102–47–3 (.685), finishing 6.0 games ahead of the second-place Baltimore Orioles and winning their second straight National League pennant and their eighth overall. It was also their fifth, and last, of the decade. This team has been cited (along with the 1880s St. Louis Browns and the 1890s Baltimore Orioles) as one of the greatest of the 19th century. This was the end of a tremendous run of success for the team, which won four straight National Association titles (1872–1875) and eight National League pennants (1877, 1878, 1883, 1891–1893, 1897-1898).

The starting line-up featured three Hall of Famers: third baseman Jimmy Collins and outfielders Billy Hamilton and Hugh Duffy. Collins led the league with 15 home runs and Hamilton had a batting average of .369 with 54 stolen bases. The pitching staff was led by Hall of Famers Kid Nichols and Vic Willis. Nichols led the NL with 31 wins and had an earned run average (ERA) of 2.13.

== Regular season ==
=== Season standings ===
National League
Team	W	L	Pct.	GB	Home	Road
Boston Beaneaters	102	47	.685	—	62‍–‍15	40‍–‍32
Baltimore Orioles	96	53	.644	6	58‍–‍15	38‍–‍38
Cincinnati Reds	92	60	.605	11½	58‍–‍28	34‍–‍32
Chicago Orphans	85	65	.567	17½	58‍–‍31	27‍–‍34
Cleveland Spiders	81	68	.544	21	36‍–‍19	45‍–‍49
Philadelphia Phillies	78	71	.523	24	49‍–‍31	29‍–‍40
New York Giants	77	73	.513	25½	45‍–‍28	32‍–‍45
Pittsburgh Pirates	72	76	.486	29½	39‍–‍35	33‍–‍41
Louisville Colonels	70	81	.464	33	43‍–‍34	27‍–‍47
Brooklyn Bridegrooms	54	91	.372	46	30‍–‍41	24‍–‍50
Washington Senators	51	101	.336	52½	34‍–‍44	17‍–‍57
St. Louis Browns	39	111	.260	63½	20‍–‍44	19‍–‍67

=== Record vs. opponents ===
1898 National League record Sources:
Team	BAL	BSN	BRO	CHI	CIN	CLE	LOU	NYG	PHI	PIT	STL	WAS
Baltimore	—	5–7	8–5–1	9–5	8–6–1	8–6–1	9–5	10–3–1	10–3–1	10–4	12–2	7–7
Boston	7–5	—	11–2	9–5	9–4–1	6–7–1	8–6–1	10–4	10–4	9–5	12–2	11–3
Brooklyn	5–8–1	2–11	—	4–10	3–11	6–7	2–10–1	3–11	6–6	9–5–1	7–6–1	7–6
Chicago	5–9	5–9	10–4	—	6–8	7–7	9–5	9–5–1	6–7	7–4–1	10–4	11–3
Cincinnati	6–8–1	4–9–1	11–3	8–6	—	8–5–2	9–5	6–8–1	7–7	12–2	12–2	9–5
Cleveland	6–8–1	7–6–1	7–6	7–7	5–8–2	—	9–5	6–8	7–7	5–8	10–3–1	12–2–2
Louisville	5–9	6–8–1	10–2–1	5–9	5–9	5–9	—	6–8	4–10	4–9–1	10–4	10–4
New York	3–10–1	4–10	11–3	5–9–1	8–6–1	8–6	8–6	—	6–7	5–9–1	10–3–2	9–4–1
Philadelphia	3–10–1	4–10	6–6	7–6	7–7	7–7	10–4	7–6	—	6–8	9–5	12–2
Pittsburgh	4–10	5–9	5–9–1	4–7–1	2–12	8–5	9–4–1	9–5–1	8–6	—	9–4	9–5
St. Louis	2–12	2–12	6–7–1	4–10	2–12	3–10–1	4–10	3–10–2	5–9	4–9	—	4–10
Washington	7–7	3–11	6–7	3–11	5–9	2–12–2	4–10	4–9–1	2–12	5–9	10–4	—

=== Roster ===
1898 Boston Beaneaters roster
Roster
Pitchers: Fred Klobedanz; Ted Lewis; Kid Nichols; Jim Sullivan; Vic Willis	Catchers: Marty Bergen; Kitty Bransfield; George Yeager; Infielders: Jimmy Collins; Bill Keister; Herman Long; Bobby Lowe; Stub Smith; Fred Tenney	Outfielders: Hugh Duffy; Billy Hamilton; Charlie Hickman; Hi Ladd; Dave Pickett; General Stafford; Chick Stahl; Jack Stivetts	Manager: Frank Selee

== Player stats ==
=== Batting ===
==== Starters by position ====
Note: Pos = Position; G = Games played; AB = At bats; H = Hits; Avg. = Batting average; HR = Home runs; RBI = Runs batted in

Pos	Player	G	AB	H	Avg.	HR	RBI
C	Marty Bergen	120	446	125	.280	3	60
1B	Fred Tenney	117	488	160	.328	0	62
2B	Bobby Lowe	147	559	152	.272	4	94
3B	Jimmy Collins	152	597	196	.328	15	111
SS	Herman Long	144	589	156	.265	6	99
OF	Hugh Duffy	152	568	169	.298	8	108
OF	Chick Stahl	125	467	144	.308	3	52
OF	Billy Hamilton	110	417	154	.369	3	50

==== Other batters ====
Note: G = Games played; AB = At bats; H = Hits; Avg. = Batting average; HR = Home runs; RBI = Runs batted in

Player	G	AB	H	Avg.	HR	RBI
George Yeager	68	221	59	.267	3	24
General Stafford	37	123	32	.260	1	8
Jack Stivetts	41	111	28	.252	2	16
Charlie Hickman	19	58	15	.259	0	7
Dave Pickett	14	43	12	.279	0	3
Bill Keister	10	30	5	.167	0	4
Stub Smith	3	10	1	.100	0	0
Kitty Bransfield	5	9	2	.222	0	1
Hi Ladd	1	4	1	.250	0	0

=== Pitching ===
==== Starting pitchers ====
Note: G = Games pitched; IP = Innings pitched; W = Wins; L = Losses; ERA = Earned run average; SO = Strikeouts

Player	G	IP	W	L	ERA	SO
Kid Nichols	50	388.0	31	12	2.13	138
Edward M. Lewis	41	313.1	26	8	2.90	72
Vic Willis	41	311.0	25	13	2.84	160
Fred Klobedanz	35	270.2	19	10	3.89	51

==== Other pitchers ====
Note: G = Games pitched; IP = Innings pitched; W = Wins; L = Losses; ERA = Earned run average; SO = Strikeouts

Player	G	IP	W	L	ERA	SO
Charlie Hickman	6	33.0	1	2	2.18	9
Jack Stivetts	2	12.0	0	1	8.25	1
Jim Sullivan	3	12.0	0	1	12.00	1

== Awards and honors ==
=== League top ten finishers ===
Jimmy Collins

- NL leader in home runs (15)
- #2 in NL in RBI (111)
- #2 in NL in slugging percentage (.479)

Hugh Duffy

- #4 in NL in RBI (108)

Sliding Billy Hamilton

- NL leader in on-base percentage (.480)
- #2 in NL in batting average (.369)
- #2 in NL in stolen bases (54)

Kid Nichols

- NL leader in wins (31)
- #3 in NL in ERA (2.13)
- #4 in NL in strikeouts (138)

Vic Willis

- #3 in NL in strikeouts (160)
