= 1898 Baltimore Orioles season =

1898 Baltimore Orioles
- League: National League
- Ballpark: Union Park
- City: Baltimore, Maryland
- Record: 96–53 (.644)
- League place: 2nd
- Owners: Harry Von der Horst
- Managers: Ned Hanlon

The 1898 Baltimore Orioles season was a season in American baseball. Although there was no Temple Cup after the season, the Orioles still finished second in the National League for the second straight year with a record of 96–53, 6 games behind the Boston Beaneaters. The Orioles set a Major League record which still stands, for the most batters hit by a pitch in a season, with 148.

== Regular season ==
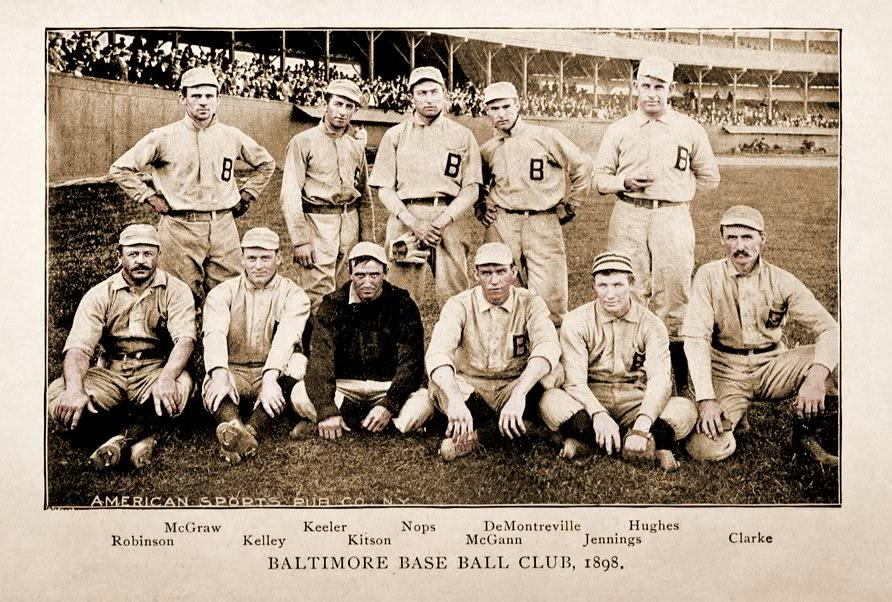
The 1898 Baltimore Orioles

=== Season standings ===
National League
Team	W	L	Pct.	GB	Home	Road
Boston Beaneaters	102	47	.685	—	62‍–‍15	40‍–‍32
Baltimore Orioles	96	53	.644	6	58‍–‍15	38‍–‍38
Cincinnati Reds	92	60	.605	11½	58‍–‍28	34‍–‍32
Chicago Orphans	85	65	.567	17½	58‍–‍31	27‍–‍34
Cleveland Spiders	81	68	.544	21	36‍–‍19	45‍–‍49
Philadelphia Phillies	78	71	.523	24	49‍–‍31	29‍–‍40
New York Giants	77	73	.513	25½	45‍–‍28	32‍–‍45
Pittsburgh Pirates	72	76	.486	29½	39‍–‍35	33‍–‍41
Louisville Colonels	70	81	.464	33	43‍–‍34	27‍–‍47
Brooklyn Bridegrooms	54	91	.372	46	30‍–‍41	24‍–‍50
Washington Senators	51	101	.336	52½	34‍–‍44	17‍–‍57
St. Louis Browns	39	111	.260	63½	20‍–‍44	19‍–‍67

=== Record vs. opponents ===
1898 National League record Sources:
Team	BAL	BSN	BRO	CHI	CIN	CLE	LOU	NYG	PHI	PIT	STL	WAS
Baltimore	—	5–7	8–5–1	9–5	8–6–1	8–6–1	9–5	10–3–1	10–3–1	10–4	12–2	7–7
Boston	7–5	—	11–2	9–5	9–4–1	6–7–1	8–6–1	10–4	10–4	9–5	12–2	11–3
Brooklyn	5–8–1	2–11	—	4–10	3–11	6–7	2–10–1	3–11	6–6	9–5–1	7–6–1	7–6
Chicago	5–9	5–9	10–4	—	6–8	7–7	9–5	9–5–1	6–7	7–4–1	10–4	11–3
Cincinnati	6–8–1	4–9–1	11–3	8–6	—	8–5–2	9–5	6–8–1	7–7	12–2	12–2	9–5
Cleveland	6–8–1	7–6–1	7–6	7–7	5–8–2	—	9–5	6–8	7–7	5–8	10–3–1	12–2–2
Louisville	5–9	6–8–1	10–2–1	5–9	5–9	5–9	—	6–8	4–10	4–9–1	10–4	10–4
New York	3–10–1	4–10	11–3	5–9–1	8–6–1	8–6	8–6	—	6–7	5–9–1	10–3–2	9–4–1
Philadelphia	3–10–1	4–10	6–6	7–6	7–7	7–7	10–4	7–6	—	6–8	9–5	12–2
Pittsburgh	4–10	5–9	5–9–1	4–7–1	2–12	8–5	9–4–1	9–5–1	8–6	—	9–4	9–5
St. Louis	2–12	2–12	6–7–1	4–10	2–12	3–10–1	4–10	3–10–2	5–9	4–9	—	4–10
Washington	7–7	3–11	6–7	3–11	5–9	2–12–2	4–10	4–9–1	2–12	5–9	10–4	—

=== Roster ===
1898 Baltimore Orioles
Roster
Pitchers: Bill Hoffer; Jay Hughes; Frank Kitson; Al Maul; Doc McJames; Jerry Nops; Arlie Pond	Catchers: Frank Bowerman; Boileryard Clarke; Mike Heydon; Wilbert Robinson; Henry Wilson; Infielders: Art Ball; Gene DeMontreville; Hughie Jennings; Dan McGann; John McGraw; Joe Quinn	Outfielders: Steve Brodie; Ducky Holmes; Willie Keeler; Joe Kelley; Tom O'Brien; Jake Stenzel	Manager: Ned Hanlon

== Player stats ==
=== Batting ===
==== Starters by position ====
Note: Pos = Position; G = Games played; AB = At bats; H = Hits; Avg. = Batting average; HR = Home runs; RBI = Runs batted in

Pos	Player	G	AB	H	Avg.	HR	RBI
C	Wilbert Robinson	79	289	80	.277	0	38
1B	Dan McGann	145	535	161	.301	5	106
2B	Gene DeMontreville	151	567	186	.328	0	86
SS	Hughie Jennings	143	534	175	.328	1	87
3B	John McGraw	143	515	176	.342	0	53
OF	Willie Keeler	129	561	216	.385	1	44
OF	Joe Kelley	124	464	149	.321	2	110
OF	Ducky Holmes	113	442	126	.285	1	64

==== Other batters ====
Note: G = Games played; AB = At bats; H = Hits; Avg. = Batting average; HR = Home runs; RBI = Runs batted in

Player	G	AB	H	Avg.	HR	RBI
Boileryard Clarke	82	285	69	.242	0	27
Jake Stenzel	35	138	35	.254	0	22
Steve Brodie	23	98	30	.306	0	19
Art Ball	32	81	15	.185	0	8
Tom O'Brien	18	60	13	.217	0	14
Joe Quinn	12	32	8	.250	0	5
Frank Bowerman	5	16	7	.438	0	1
Mike Heydon	3	9	1	.111	0	1
Henry Wilson	1	2	0	.000	0	0

=== Pitching ===
==== Starting pitchers ====
Note: G = Games pitched; IP = Innings pitched; W = Wins; L = Losses; ERA = Earned run average; SO = Strikeouts

Player	G	IP	W	L	ERA	SO
Doc McJames	45	374.0	27	15	2.36	178
Jay Hughes	38	300.2	23	12	3.20	81
Al Maul	28	239.2	20	7	2.10	31
Jerry Nops	33	235.0	16	9	3.56	91
Frank Kitson	17	119.1	8	5	3.24	32
Bill Hoffer	4	34.1	0	4	7.34	5

==== Other pitchers ====
Note: G = Games pitched; IP = Innings pitched; W = Wins; L = Losses; ERA = Earned run average; SO = Strikeouts

Player	G	IP	W	L	ERA	SO
Arlie Pond	3	20.0	1	1	0.45	4
