= Joe Regan =

American baseball player (1872–1948)

- Outfielder
- Born: July 12, 1872; Seymour, Connecticut, U.S.
- Died: November 18, 1948 (aged 76); Hartford, Connecticut, U.S.
- Batted: Right Threw: Right

MLB debut
- September 21, 1898, for the New York Giants

Last MLB appearance
- September 22, 1898, for the New York Giants

MLB statistics
- Games played: 2
- At bats: 5
- Hits: 1
- Stats at Baseball Reference

Teams
- New York Giants (1898)

Joseph Charles Regan (July 12, 1872 – November 18, 1948) was an American outfielder in Major League Baseball. He played for the New York Giants in 1898.
