= Bob McHale =

American baseball player (1870–1952)

- Outfielder
- Born: February 7, 1870; Sacramento, California, U.S.
- Died: June 9, 1952 (aged 82); Sacramento, California, U.S.
- Batted: Unknown Threw: Right

MLB debut
- May 9, 1898, for the Washington Senators

Last MLB appearance
- June 4, 1898, for the Washington Senators

MLB statistics
- Batting average: .182
- Home runs: 0
- Runs batted in: 7
- Stats at Baseball Reference

Teams
- Washington Senators (1898)

Robert Emmet "Rabbit" McHale (February 7, 1870 – June 9, 1952) was an American outfielder in Major League Baseball who played for the Washington Senators of the National League in 1898. His minor league career stretched from 1889 through 1909, mostly on the West Coast.
