= Joe Gannon (baseball) =

American baseball player (1877–1931)

- Pitcher
- Born: February 22, 1877; St. Louis, Missouri
- Died: March 19, 1931 (aged 54); St. Louis, Missouri
- Batted: Unknown Threw: Unknown

MLB debut
- August 28, 1898, for the St. Louis Browns

Last MLB appearance
- August 28, 1898, for the St. Louis Browns

MLB statistics
- Win–loss record: 0-1
- Earned run average: 11.00
- Strikeouts: 2

Teams
- St. Louis Browns (1898)

Michael Joseph Gannon (February 22, 1877 – March 19, 1931) was a pitcher in Major League Baseball who played for the St. Louis Browns of the National League during the 1898 season.
