= John Richter (baseball) =

American baseball player (1873–1927)

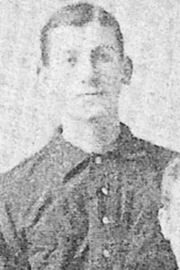
- Third baseman
- Born: February 8, 1873; Louisville, Kentucky, U.S.
- Died: October 4, 1927 (aged 54); Louisville, Kentucky, U.S.
- Batted: Unknown Threw: Unknown

MLB debut
- October 6, 1898, for the Louisville Colonels

Last MLB appearance
- October 9, 1898, for the Louisville Colonels

MLB statistics
- Games played: 3
- At bats: 13
- Hits: 2
- Stats at Baseball Reference

Teams
- Louisville Colonels (1898)

John Marcellus Richter (February 8, 1873 – October 4, 1927) was an American Major League Baseball third baseman. He played for the 1898 Louisville Colonels.

== Sources ==
- Career statistics from Baseball Reference · Baseball Reference (Minors) · Retrosheet · Baseball Almanac
