= George Kelb =

American baseball player (1870–1936)

- Pitcher
- Born: July 17, 1870; Toledo, Ohio, U.S.
- Died: October 20, 1936 (aged 66); Toledo, Ohio, U.S.
- Batted: Left Threw: Left

MLB debut
- April 17, 1898, for the Cleveland Spiders

Last MLB appearance
- June 24, 1898, for the Cleveland Spiders

MLB statistics
- Win–loss record: 0-1
- Earned run average: 4.41
- Strikeouts: 8
- Stats at Baseball Reference

Teams
- Cleveland Spiders (1898)

George Francis Kelb (July 17, 1870 – October 20, 1936) was an American pitcher in Major League Baseball. He played for the Cleveland Spiders in 1898.
