= Tommy Tucker (baseball) =

American baseball player (1863–1935)

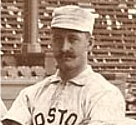
- Tucker in 1890
- First baseman
- Born: October 28, 1863; Holyoke, Massachusetts, U.S.
- Died: October 22, 1935 (aged 71); Montague, Massachusetts, U.S.
- Batted: Switch Threw: Right

MLB debut
- April 16, 1887, for the Baltimore Orioles

Last MLB appearance
- September 13, 1899, for the Cleveland Spiders

MLB statistics
- Batting average: .290
- Home runs: 42
- Runs batted in: 932
- Stats at Baseball Reference

Teams
- Baltimore Orioles (1887–1889); Boston Beaneaters (1890–1897); Washington Senators (1897); Brooklyn Bridegrooms (1898); St. Louis Browns (1898); Cleveland Spiders (1899)

Career highlights and awards
- American Association batting champion (1889)

Thomas Joseph Tucker (October 28, 1863 – October 22, 1935), nicknamed "Foghorn Tom", was an American first baseman in Major League Baseball who played for six different teams between 1887 and 1899. Listed at 5 ft 11 in (1.80 m) and 165 pounds, Tucker was a switch hitter and threw right-handed.

== Baseball career ==
Tucker was born in Holyoke, Massachusetts, in 1863 and started his baseball career playing for the Springfield and Newark clubs. He was a flashy first baseman in an era when using two hands was normal, making one-handed scoops of wild throws and pick-ups with his small glove, in contrast to the bigger gloves employed by later first basemen.

Tucker entered the majors in 1887 with the Baltimore Orioles of the American Association, playing for them three years before joining the National League with the Boston Beaneaters (1890–1897), Washington Senators (1897), Brooklyn Bridegrooms (1898), St. Louis Browns (1898) and Cleveland Spiders (1899).

Tucker's most productive season was in 1889 with Baltimore, when he led AA hitters with a .372 batting average (still the highest league-leading average ever for a switch hitter) and 196 hits. His .372 average was 118 points above the Baltimore team average of .254.

On July 22, 1893, Tucker tied a major league record with four doubles in a single game. He posted a 6-for-6 game on July 15, 1897.

In his 13-season MLB career, Tucker was a .290 hitter (1882-for-6482) with 42 home runs and 932 RBI in 1688 games played, and he had 1084 runs, 240 doubles, 85 triples, and 352 stolen bases.

Tucker was hit by a pitch 272 times during his career, which was a major league record. He currently ranks third on the all-time list behind Hughie Jennings (287) and Craig Biggio (285), and over Don Baylor (267).

Tucker had a reputation of being one of the toughest players of his era. He was notorious for hip-checking base runners off first base and then tagging them out. He received the nickname "Noisy Tom" in Boston, while "Foghorn Tom" was among the many names by which he was known in Baltimore.

Tucker died in Montague, Massachusetts, in 1935.

== See also ==
- List of Major League Baseball career runs scored leaders
- List of Major League Baseball career hit by pitch leaders
- List of Major League Baseball batting champions
- List of Major League Baseball single-game hits leaders
