= John Anderson (outfielder) =

American baseball player (1873–1949)

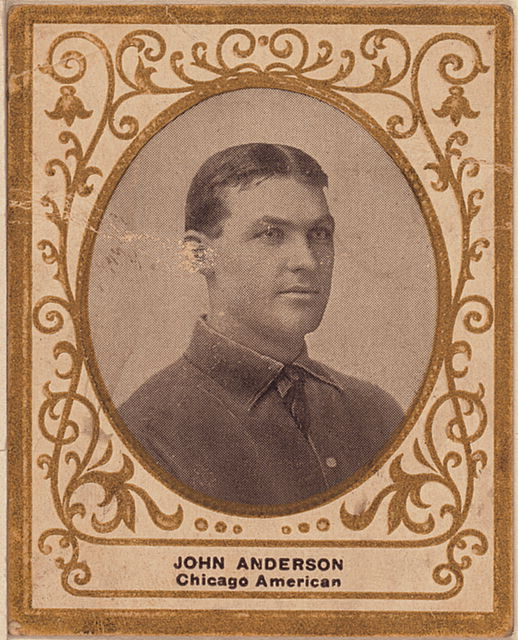
- Outfielder / First baseman
- Born: December 14, 1873; Sarpsborg, Norway
- Died: July 23, 1949 (aged 75); Worcester, Massachusetts, U.S.
- Batted: Switch Threw: Right

Major league debut
- September 8, 1894, for the Brooklyn Grooms

Last major league appearance
- October 2, 1908, for the Chicago White Sox

Major league statistics
- Batting average: .290
- Home runs: 50
- Runs batted in: 978
- Stolen bases: 338
- Stats at Baseball Reference

Teams
- Brooklyn Grooms/Bridegrooms (1894–1898); Washington Senators (1898); Brooklyn Bridegrooms/Superbas (1898–1899); Milwaukee Brewers/St. Louis Browns (1901–1903); New York Highlanders (1904–1905); Washington Senators (1905–1907); Chicago White Sox (1908)

Career highlights and awards
- AL stolen base leader (1906)

John Joseph Anderson (December 14, 1873 – July 23, 1949), nicknamed "Honest John", was an American professional baseball first baseman and outfielder. He played fourteen seasons in major league baseball for the Brooklyn Grooms/Bridegrooms, Washington Senators, Brooklyn Bridegrooms/Superbas, Milwaukee Brewers/St. Louis Browns, New York Highlanders, Washington Senators, and Chicago White Sox between 1894 and 1908.

Anderson was the first of only three major league players to have been born in Norway. He first appeared in the National League in 1894, when he signed with the Brooklyn Grooms. He spent the next three full seasons with Brooklyn and was primarily used as an outfielder, and batted over .300 in both 1896 and 1897.

During the 1898 season, he was sold to the Washington Senators, only to be sold back to Brooklyn four months later. Nevertheless, he managed to have one of his best seasons, leading the National League with 22 triples and also leading the league in slugging percentage and extra-base hits. Anderson stayed in Brooklyn for the 1899 season before being purchased by the Milwaukee Brewers of the newly formed American League.

Anderson was one of the league's best hitters in the AL's first year as a major league in 1901. (In 1900, the American League was still considered a minor league.) As the Brewers' first baseman, he finished second in the league in base hits and doubles, trailing only Nap Lajoie in both categories, ranked third in runs batted in behind Lajoie and Buck Freeman, and was sixth in the league with a .330 average.

He stayed with the franchise when it relocated to St. Louis in 1902 to become the Browns. He played two seasons in St. Louis and recorded virtually identical .284 batting averages in those years.

On September 24, 1903, Anderson reportedly tried to steal second base when the base was already occupied. This particular play, or a mental mistake in general, was often referred to as a "John Anderson" in the early part of the century.

Anderson was dealt to the New York Highlanders before the 1904 season in exchange for Jack O'Connor. He played one full season in New York and batted .278 with the club. He started the 1905 season in New York but was waived after a slow start. The Washington Senators (a different franchise than the team he played for in 1898) claimed him off of waivers, and he recovered to bat .279 on the season, good enough for ninth in the AL in the midst of the dead-ball era.

He remained in Washington for the next two seasons. In 1906, Anderson tied for the American League lead in stolen bases with Elmer Flick. His contract was purchased by the Chicago White Sox for the 1908 season. Late that season, when the White Sox faced the Cleveland Naps with both involved in a tight pennant race, Anderson would prove to be the last out in the second ever perfect game in MLB's modern era, pitched by Addie Joss in a tight pitching duel that also saw Anderson's future Hall of Fame teammate Ed Walsh strikeout 15 and allow only one run. Anderson retired from the Major Leagues at the conclusion of the 1908 season.

Anderson retired with a .290 career average, 50 home runs, and 978 runs batted in. He also finished his career with 124 triples, currently tying him for 91st place all-time in that category.

After retirement, he became an officer for the Worcester Police Department until resigning in 1920 to coach the Buffalo Bisons. He died at the age of 75 in Worcester, Massachusetts.

== See also ==
- List of Major League Baseball career triples leaders
- List of Major League Baseball career stolen bases leaders
- List of Major League Baseball annual stolen base leaders
- List of Major League Baseball annual triples leaders
