= Chick Fraser =

American baseball player (1873–1940)

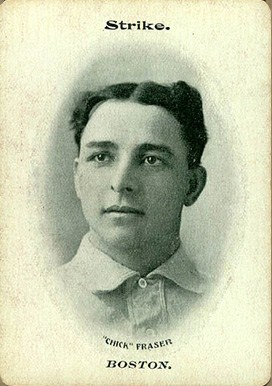
- Pitcher
- Born: August 26, 1873; Chicago, Illinois, U.S.
- Died: May 8, 1940 (aged 66); Wendell, Idaho, U.S.
- Batted: Right Threw: Right

MLB debut
- April 19, 1896, for the Louisville Colonels

Last MLB appearance
- May 3, 1909, for the Chicago Cubs

MLB statistics
- Win–loss record: 175–212
- Earned run average: 3.67
- Strikeouts: 1,098
- Stats at Baseball Reference

Teams
- Louisville Colonels (1896–1898); Cleveland Spiders (1898); Philadelphia Phillies (1899–1900); Philadelphia Athletics (1901); Philadelphia Phillies (1902–1904); Boston Beaneaters (1905); Cincinnati Reds (1906); Chicago Cubs (1907–1909)

Career highlights and awards
- World Series champion (1908); Pitched a no-hitter on September 18, 1903

Charles Carrolton Fraser (August 26, 1873 – May 8, 1940) was an American Major League Baseball right-handed pitcher. He pitched for numerous teams between 1896 and 1909. He ranks second all time among major-league pitchers in the category of hit batsmen, with 219. He lost 20 games five times, but he threw a no-hitter in 1903 and played on World Series championship teams for two years.

== Career ==
Fraser made his major-league debut with the Louisville Colonels on April 19, 1896. He often struggled with control. In his rookie season, he finished with a 12–27 record and he led the league in both bases on balls and wild pitches. In 1897, he went 15–19 and led the league in wild pitches again. He was sold to the Cleveland Spiders late in the 1898 season. He pitched for the Philadelphia Phillies for two seasons and then went to the Philadelphia Athletics for the 1901 season where he set the modern day record for most hit batsmen in a season.

While a member of the Philadelphia Phillies for a second time between 1902 and 1904, Fraser threw a no-hitter on September 18, 1903. The Phillies committed four errors in that game, but they beat the Chicago Cubs 10–0. Fraser was a member of the 1907 and 1908 Chicago Cubs teams that won the World Series.

He appeared in his final game on May 3, 1909. In an era in which complete games were the rule, Fraser had large numbers of decisions in each season. He lost 20 or more games five times in the major leagues, but in each of those seasons there were at least two major-league pitchers with more losses. Since Fraser's retirement, he has been in second place among all major-league pitchers in hit batsmen.

== Personal life ==
Before the 1897 season, Fraser married Mina Gray; she was the daughter of a successful glassmaker in Chicago. Mina Gray's sister, Annette Gray, had been a bridesmaid in the wedding. Baseball player and manager Fred Clarke fell in love with Annette Gray and they later married. Mina Gray died in 1937.

== Later life ==
Late in his life, Fraser ran an alfalfa farm, was a minor-league manager, and scouted for the Brooklyn Dodgers and New York Yankees. Fraser died in 1940 and Annette was at his bedside at the time. He had been suffering from an infection that had required the amputation of one of his legs.

== See also ==
- List of Major League Baseball career hit batsmen leaders
- List of Major League Baseball no-hitters

Preceded by Nixey Callahan	No-hitter pitcher September 18, 1903	Succeeded by Cy Young
