= 1899 Washington Senators season =

1899 Washington Senators
- League: National League
- Ballpark: Boundary Field
- City: Washington, D.C.
- Record: 54–98 (.355)
- League place: 11th
- Owners: J. Earl Wagner
- Managers: Arthur Irwin

The 1899 Washington Senators baseball team finished the season with a 54–98 record, eleventh place in the National League.

The 25 home runs that right fielder Buck Freeman recorded were truly remarkable by the standards of the time; his tally was not surpassed until Babe Ruth hit 29 home runs with the 1919 Boston Red Sox.

When the NL contracted after the season, the Senators were disbanded. Owner J. Earl Wagner received $39,000 for his interest in the team.

== Regular season ==
=== Season standings ===
National League
Team	W	L	Pct.	GB	Home	Road
Brooklyn Superbas	101	47	.682	—	61‍–‍16	40‍–‍31
Boston Beaneaters	95	57	.625	8	53‍–‍26	42‍–‍31
Philadelphia Phillies	94	58	.618	9	58‍–‍25	36‍–‍33
Baltimore Orioles	86	62	.581	15	51‍–‍24	35‍–‍38
St. Louis Perfectos	84	67	.556	18½	50‍–‍33	34‍–‍34
Cincinnati Reds	83	67	.553	19	57‍–‍29	26‍–‍38
Pittsburgh Pirates	76	73	.510	25½	49‍–‍34	27‍–‍39
Chicago Orphans	75	73	.507	26	44‍–‍39	31‍–‍34
Louisville Colonels	75	77	.493	28	33‍–‍28	42‍–‍49
New York Giants	60	90	.400	42	35‍–‍38	25‍–‍52
Washington Senators	54	98	.355	49	35‍–‍43	19‍–‍55
Cleveland Spiders	20	134	.130	84	9‍–‍33	11‍–‍101

=== Record vs. opponents ===
1899 National League record Sources:
Team	BAL	BSN	BRO	CHI	CIN	CLE	LOU	NYG	PHI	PIT	STL	WAS
Baltimore	—	7–7	6–8	9–5	4–9	12–2	6–7–2	10–4	6–7–1	9–3	8–6	9–4–1
Boston	7–7	—	6–8	5–7	10–4	11–3	9–5	12–2	5–9	10–4	8–6	12–2–1
Brooklyn	8–6	8–6	—	8–5–1	7–6	14–0	11–3	10–4	8–6	8–6	8–4–1	11–3
Chicago	5–9	7–5	5–8–1	—	8–6	13–1	7–7	7–6–1	5–9	6–7–2	8–6	4–9
Cincinnati	9–4	4–10	6–7	6–8	—	14–0	8–6	9–5–1	4–10	10–3–3	5–8–2	8–6–1
Cleveland	2–12	3–11	0–14	1–13	0–14	—	4–10	1–13	2–12	2–12	1–13	4–10
Louisville	7–6–2	5–9	3–11	7–7	6–8	10–4	—	7–7	7–6	6–8–1	5–9–1	12–2
New York	4–10	2–12	2–10	6–7–1	5–9–1	13–1	7–7	—	4–10–1	6–7	4–10	7–7
Philadelphia	7–6–1	9–5	6–8	9–5	10–4	12–2	6–7	10–4–1	—	6–8	7–7	12–2
Pittsburgh	3–9	4–10	6–8	7–6–2	3–10–3	12–2	8–6–1	7–6	8–6	—	7–7	11–3
St. Louis	6–8	6–8	4–8–1	6–8	8–5–2	13–1	9–5–1	10–4	7–7	7–7	—	8–6
Washington	4–9–1	2–12–1	3–11	9–4	6–8–1	10–4	2–12	7–7	2–12	3–11	6–8	—

=== Roster ===
1899 Washington Senators
Roster
Pitchers: Kirtley Baker; Kid Carsey; Bill Dinneen; Davey Dunkle; Roy Evans; Jack Fifield; Lefty Herring; Frank Killen; Bill Leith; Bill Magee; Dan McFarlan; Dorsey Riddlemoser; Gus Weyhing	Catchers: Dick Butler; Jim Duncan; Duke Farrell; Mike Heydon; Malachi Kittridge; Deacon McGuire; Frank McManus; Doc Powers; Mike Roach; Infielders: Charlie Atherton; Frank Bonner; Doc Casey; Pete Cassidy; Bill Coughlin; Harry Davis; George Decker; Billy Hulen; Dan McGann; Win Mercer; Dick Padden; Frank Scheibeck; General Stafford	Outfielders: Shad Barry; Buck Freeman; Jake Gettman; Arlie Latham; Jack O'Brien; Jimmy Slagle	Manager: Arthur Irwin

== Player stats ==
=== Batting ===
==== Starters by position ====
Note: Pos = Position; G = Games played; AB = At bats; H = Hits; Avg. = Batting average; HR = Home runs; RBI = Runs batted in

Pos	Player	G	AB	H	Avg.	HR	RBI
C	Deacon McGuire	58	195	54	.277	1	12
1B	Dan McGann	77	284	96	.338	5	58
2B	Frank Bonner	85	347	95	.274	2	44
SS	Dick Padden	134	451	125	.277	2	61
3B	Charlie Atherton	65	242	60	.248	0	23
OF	Jack O'Brien	127	468	132	.282	6	51
OF	Buck Freeman	155	588	187	.318	25	122
OF	Jimmy Slagle	147	599	163	.272	0	41

==== Other batters ====
Note: G = Games played; AB = At bats; H = Hits; Avg. = Batting average; HR = Home runs; RBI = Runs batted in

Player	G	AB	H	Avg.	HR	RBI
Win Mercer	108	375	112	.299	1	35
Shad Barry	78	247	71	.287	1	33
Pete Cassidy	46	178	56	.315	3	32
Malachi Kittridge	44	133	20	.150	0	11
General Stafford	31	118	29	.246	1	14
Frank Scheibeck	27	94	27	.287	0	9
Mike Roach	24	78	17	.218	0	7
Billy Hulen	19	68	10	.147	0	3
Harry Davis	18	64	12	.188	0	8
Jake Gettman	19	62	13	.210	0	2
Jim Duncan	15	47	11	.234	0	5
Doc Powers	14	38	10	.263	0	3
Dick Butler	12	36	10	.278	0	1
Doc Casey	9	34	4	.118	0	2
Bill Coughlin	6	24	3	.125	0	3
Frank McManus	7	21	8	.381	0	2
Duke Farrell	5	12	4	.333	0	1
George Decker	4	9	0	.000	0	0
Arlie Latham	6	6	1	.167	0	0
Mike Heydon	3	3	0	.000	0	0

=== Pitching ===
==== Starting pitchers ====
Note: G = Games pitched; IP = Innings pitched; W = Wins; L = Losses; ERA = Earned run average; SO = Strikeouts

Player	G	IP	W	L	ERA	SO
Gus Weyhing	43	334.2	17	21	4.54	96
Bill Dinneen	37	291.0	14	20	3.93	91
Dan McFarlan	32	211.2	8	18	4.76	41
Win Mercer	23	186.0	7	14	4.60	28
Roy Evans	7	54.0	3	4	5.67	27
Jack Fifield	6	47.0	2	4	6.13	12
Bill Magee	8	42.0	1	4	8.57	11
Kid Carsey	4	29.0	1	2	3.72	3
Frank Killen	2	12.0	0	2	6.00	3

==== Other pitchers ====
Note: G = Games pitched; IP = Innings pitched; W = Wins; L = Losses; ERA = Earned run average; SO = Strikeouts

Player	G	IP	W	L	ERA	SO
Kirtley Baker	11	54.0	1	7	6.83	6
Davey Dunkle	4	26.0	0	2	10.04	9

==== Relief pitchers ====
Note: G = Games pitched; W = Wins; L = Losses; SV = Saves; ERA = Earned run average; SO = Strikeouts

Player	G	W	L	SV	ERA	SO
Buck Freeman	2	0	0	0	7.71	0
Lefty Herring	2	0	0	0	0.00	0
Bill Leith	1	0	0	0	18.00	1
Dorsey Riddlemoser	1	0	0	0	18.00	0
