= 1899 Louisville Colonels season =

1899 Louisville Colonels
- League: National League
- Ballpark: Eclipse Park II
- City: Louisville, Kentucky
- Record: 75–77 (.493)
- League place: 9th
- Owners: Barney Dreyfuss
- Managers: Fred Clarke

The 1899 Louisville Colonels baseball team finished with a 75–77 record and ninth place in the National League. Following the season, owner Barney Dreyfuss bought the Pittsburgh Pirates organization and folded his Louisville team. Manager Fred Clarke and most of the players moved over to the Pirates where they enjoyed much more success in the coming years. The Colonels, a perennial also-ran through their National League run from 1892 to 1899, appeared to be on the cusp of becoming a strong team when the National League contracted from 12 teams to 8 after the end of the 1899 season. Louisville started the season with a 15–37 record after 52 games, but then went 60–40 in their last 100 in the first glimpse of what was to become a strong Pirates team in the years to come. Many star players, including several Hall of Famers, of the first decade of the 20th Century came from the 1899 Louisville squad including Clarke, Honus Wagner, Rube Waddell, Deacon Phillippe, Tommy Leach and Claude Ritchey.

== Regular season ==
=== Season standings ===
National League
| Team | W | L | Pct. | GB | Home | Road |
|---|---|---|---|---|---|---|
| Brooklyn Superbas | 101 | 47 | .682 | — | 61‍–‍16 | 40‍–‍31 |
| Boston Beaneaters | 95 | 57 | .625 | 8 | 53‍–‍26 | 42‍–‍31 |
| Philadelphia Phillies | 94 | 58 | .618 | 9 | 58‍–‍25 | 36‍–‍33 |
| Baltimore Orioles | 86 | 62 | .581 | 15 | 51‍–‍24 | 35‍–‍38 |
| St. Louis Perfectos | 84 | 67 | .556 | 18½ | 50‍–‍33 | 34‍–‍34 |
| Cincinnati Reds | 83 | 67 | .553 | 19 | 57‍–‍29 | 26‍–‍38 |
| Pittsburgh Pirates | 76 | 73 | .510 | 25½ | 49‍–‍34 | 27‍–‍39 |
| Chicago Orphans | 75 | 73 | .507 | 26 | 44‍–‍39 | 31‍–‍34 |
| Louisville Colonels | 75 | 77 | .493 | 28 | 33‍–‍28 | 42‍–‍49 |
| New York Giants | 60 | 90 | .400 | 42 | 35‍–‍38 | 25‍–‍52 |
| Washington Senators | 54 | 98 | .355 | 49 | 35‍–‍43 | 19‍–‍55 |
| Cleveland Spiders | 20 | 134 | .130 | 84 | 9‍–‍33 | 11‍–‍101 |

=== Record vs. opponents ===
1899 National League record Sources:
| Team | BAL | BSN | BRO | CHI | CIN | CLE | LOU | NYG | PHI | PIT | STL | WAS |
|---|---|---|---|---|---|---|---|---|---|---|---|---|
| Baltimore | — | 7–7 | 6–8 | 9–5 | 4–9 | 12–2 | 6–7–2 | 10–4 | 6–7–1 | 9–3 | 8–6 | 9–4–1 |
| Boston | 7–7 | — | 6–8 | 5–7 | 10–4 | 11–3 | 9–5 | 12–2 | 5–9 | 10–4 | 8–6 | 12–2–1 |
| Brooklyn | 8–6 | 8–6 | — | 8–5–1 | 7–6 | 14–0 | 11–3 | 10–4 | 8–6 | 8–6 | 8–4–1 | 11–3 |
| Chicago | 5–9 | 7–5 | 5–8–1 | — | 8–6 | 13–1 | 7–7 | 7–6–1 | 5–9 | 6–7–2 | 8–6 | 4–9 |
| Cincinnati | 9–4 | 4–10 | 6–7 | 6–8 | — | 14–0 | 8–6 | 9–5–1 | 4–10 | 10–3–3 | 5–8–2 | 8–6–1 |
| Cleveland | 2–12 | 3–11 | 0–14 | 1–13 | 0–14 | — | 4–10 | 1–13 | 2–12 | 2–12 | 1–13 | 4–10 |
| Louisville | 7–6–2 | 5–9 | 3–11 | 7–7 | 6–8 | 10–4 | — | 7–7 | 7–6 | 6–8–1 | 5–9–1 | 12–2 |
| New York | 4–10 | 2–12 | 2–10 | 6–7–1 | 5–9–1 | 13–1 | 7–7 | — | 4–10–1 | 6–7 | 4–10 | 7–7 |
| Philadelphia | 7–6–1 | 9–5 | 6–8 | 9–5 | 10–4 | 12–2 | 6–7 | 10–4–1 | — | 6–8 | 7–7 | 12–2 |
| Pittsburgh | 3–9 | 4–10 | 6–8 | 7–6–2 | 3–10–3 | 12–2 | 8–6–1 | 7–6 | 8–6 | — | 7–7 | 11–3 |
| St. Louis | 6–8 | 6–8 | 4–8–1 | 6–8 | 8–5–2 | 13–1 | 9–5–1 | 10–4 | 7–7 | 7–7 | — | 8–6 |
| Washington | 4–9–1 | 2–12–1 | 3–11 | 9–4 | 6–8–1 | 10–4 | 2–12 | 7–7 | 2–12 | 3–11 | 6–8 | — |

=== Roster ===
1899 Louisville Colonels
Roster
| Pitchers: Kitty Brashear; Bert Cunningham; Pete Dowling; Clay Fauver; Patsy Flaherty; Bill Magee; Deacon Phillippe; Rube Waddell; Harry Wilhelm; Walt Woods | Catchers: Malachi Kittridge; Tacks Latimer; Tom Messitt; Doc Powers; Farmer Steelman; Chief Zimmer; Infielders: Burley Bayer; Billy Clingman; George Decker; Rudy Hulswitt; Mike Kelley; Bob Langsford; Tommy Leach; Claude Ritchey; Honus Wagner; Dave Wills | Outfielders: Fred Clarke; Harry Croft; Charlie Dexter; Topsy Hartsel; Dummy Hoy; Fred Ketcham | Manager: Fred Clarke |

== Player stats ==
=== Batting ===
==== Starters by position ====
Note: Pos = Position; G = Games played; AB = At bats; H = Hits; Avg. = Batting average; HR = Home runs; RBI = Runs batted in

| Pos | Player | G | AB | H | Avg. | HR | RBI |
|---|---|---|---|---|---|---|---|
| C | Chief Zimmer | 75 | 262 | 78 | .298 | 2 | 29 |
| 1B | Mike Kelley | 76 | 282 | 68 | .241 | 3 | 33 |
| 2B | Claude Ritchey | 148 | 540 | 162 | .300 | 4 | 73 |
| SS | Billy Clingman | 110 | 369 | 97 | .263 | 2 | 45 |
| 3B | Tommy Leach | 106 | 406 | 117 | .288 | 5 | 57 |
| OF | Charlie Dexter | 81 | 298 | 76 | .255 | 1 | 34 |
| OF | Dummy Hoy | 155 | 636 | 194 | .305 | 5 | 49 |
| OF | Fred Clarke | 148 | 602 | 206 | .342 | 5 | 70 |

==== Other batters ====
Note: G = Games played; AB = At bats; H = Hits; Avg. = Batting average; HR = Home runs; RBI = Runs batted in

| Player | G | AB | H | Avg. | HR | RBI |
|---|---|---|---|---|---|---|
| Honus Wagner | 148 | 575 | 196 | .341 | 7 | 114 |
| Doc Powers | 49 | 169 | 35 | .207 | 0 | 22 |
| George Decker | 39 | 138 | 37 | .268 | 1 | 18 |
| Malachi Kittridge | 46 | 131 | 26 | .198 | 0 | 13 |
| Dave Wills | 24 | 94 | 21 | .223 | 0 | 12 |
| Topsy Hartsel | 30 | 75 | 18 | .240 | 1 | 7 |
| Fred Ketchum | 15 | 61 | 18 | .295 | 0 | 5 |
| Tacks Latimer | 9 | 29 | 8 | .276 | 0 | 4 |
| Farmer Steelman | 4 | 15 | 1 | .067 | 0 | 2 |
| Tom Messitt | 3 | 11 | 1 | .091 | 0 | 0 |
| Bob Langsford | 1 | 4 | 0 | .000 | 0 | 0 |
| Burley Bayer | 1 | 3 | 0 | .000 | 0 | 0 |
| Harry Croft | 2 | 2 | 0 | .000 | 0 | 0 |
| Rudy Hulswitt | 1 | 0 | 0 | ---- | 0 | 0 |

=== Pitching ===
==== Starting pitchers ====
Note: G = Games pitched; IP = Innings pitched; W = Wins; L = Losses; ERA = Earned run average; SO = Strikeouts

| Player | G | IP | W | L | ERA | SO |
|---|---|---|---|---|---|---|
| Bert Cunningham | 39 | 323.2 | 17 | 17 | 3.84 | 36 |
| Deacon Phillippe | 42 | 321.0 | 21 | 17 | 3.17 | 68 |
| Pete Dowling | 35 | 298.1 | 13 | 17 | 3.05 | 89 |
| Walt Woods | 26 | 186.1 | 9 | 13 | 3.28 | 21 |
| Rube Waddell | 10 | 79.0 | 7 | 2 | 3.08 | 44 |
| Bill Magee | 12 | 71.0 | 3 | 7 | 5.20 | 13 |
| Patsy Flaherty | 5 | 39.0 | 2 | 3 | 2.31 | 5 |
| Clay Fauver | 1 | 9.0 | 1 | 0 | 0.00 | 1 |

==== Other pitchers ====
Note: G = Games pitched; IP = Innings pitched; W = Wins; L = Losses; ERA = Earned run average; SO = Strikeouts

| Player | G | IP | W | L | ERA | SO |
|---|---|---|---|---|---|---|
| Harry Wilhelm | 5 | 25.0 | 1 | 1 | 6.12 | 6 |

==== Relief pitchers ====
Note: G = Games pitched; W = Wins; L = Losses; SV = Saves; ERA = Earned run average; SO = Strikeouts

| Player | G | W | L | SV | ERA | SO |
|---|---|---|---|---|---|---|
| Kitty Brashear | 3 | 1 | 0 | 0 | 4.50 | 5 |
