= 1899 Brooklyn Superbas season =

1899 Brooklyn Superbas
- National League champions
- League: National League
- Ballpark: Washington Park
- City: Brooklyn, New York
- Record: 101–47 (.682)
- League place: 1st
- Owners: Charles Ebbets, Ferdinand Abell, Harry Von der Horst, Ned Hanlon
- President: Charles Ebbets
- Managers: Ned Hanlon

The 1899 Brooklyn Superbas season was the 16th season of the current-day Dodgers franchise and the ninth season in the National League. The team won the National League pennant with a record of 101–47, eight games ahead of the Boston Beaneaters, after finishing tenth in 1898.

== Offseason ==
The 1899 season began with the Brooklyn team and the Baltimore Orioles merging their ownership groups. Baltimore owner Harry Von der Horst and Ned Hanlon became part owners of Brooklyn. Von der Horst insisted that Hanlon become the team's new manager, a position that had been promised to outfielder Mike Griffin, who had been interim manager the previous year. Griffin quit and wound up suing the team for lost wages. His contract was sold to the Cleveland Spiders, but Griffin never played or managed in the majors again.

Renamed the Superbas as part of the deal, the team also siphoned off several of the Orioles' best players. On March 11, the team brought Bill Dahlen, Mike Heydon, Jay Hughes, Hughie Jennings, Willie Keeler, Joe Kelley, Al Maul, Dan McGann and Doc McJames onto their roster from Baltimore, while assigning Harry Howell, Candy LaChance, Kit McKenna, Ralph Miller, Jack Ryan, Jimmy Sheckard and Aleck Smith to the Orioles. This influx of talent was a good part of the reason why the Superbas won the National League pennant with 101 wins after winning just 54 games in 1898.

=== Notable transactions ===
- March 11, 1899: Mike Griffin was sold by the Superbas to the Cleveland Spiders.

== Regular season ==
=== Season standings ===
National League
Team	W	L	Pct.	GB	Home	Road
Brooklyn Superbas	101	47	.682	—	61‍–‍16	40‍–‍31
Boston Beaneaters	95	57	.625	8	53‍–‍26	42‍–‍31
Philadelphia Phillies	94	58	.618	9	58‍–‍25	36‍–‍33
Baltimore Orioles	86	62	.581	15	51‍–‍24	35‍–‍38
St. Louis Perfectos	84	67	.556	18½	50‍–‍33	34‍–‍34
Cincinnati Reds	83	67	.553	19	57‍–‍29	26‍–‍38
Pittsburgh Pirates	76	73	.510	25½	49‍–‍34	27‍–‍39
Chicago Orphans	75	73	.507	26	44‍–‍39	31‍–‍34
Louisville Colonels	75	77	.493	28	33‍–‍28	42‍–‍49
New York Giants	60	90	.400	42	35‍–‍38	25‍–‍52
Washington Senators	54	98	.355	49	35‍–‍43	19‍–‍55
Cleveland Spiders	20	134	.130	84	9‍–‍33	11‍–‍101

=== Record vs. opponents ===
1899 National League record Sources:
Team	BAL	BSN	BRO	CHI	CIN	CLE	LOU	NYG	PHI	PIT	STL	WAS
Baltimore	—	7–7	6–8	9–5	4–9	12–2	6–7–2	10–4	6–7–1	9–3	8–6	9–4–1
Boston	7–7	—	6–8	5–7	10–4	11–3	9–5	12–2	5–9	10–4	8–6	12–2–1
Brooklyn	8–6	8–6	—	8–5–1	7–6	14–0	11–3	10–4	8–6	8–6	8–4–1	11–3
Chicago	5–9	7–5	5–8–1	—	8–6	13–1	7–7	7–6–1	5–9	6–7–2	8–6	4–9
Cincinnati	9–4	4–10	6–7	6–8	—	14–0	8–6	9–5–1	4–10	10–3–3	5–8–2	8–6–1
Cleveland	2–12	3–11	0–14	1–13	0–14	—	4–10	1–13	2–12	2–12	1–13	4–10
Louisville	7–6–2	5–9	3–11	7–7	6–8	10–4	—	7–7	7–6	6–8–1	5–9–1	12–2
New York	4–10	2–12	2–10	6–7–1	5–9–1	13–1	7–7	—	4–10–1	6–7	4–10	7–7
Philadelphia	7–6–1	9–5	6–8	9–5	10–4	12–2	6–7	10–4–1	—	6–8	7–7	12–2
Pittsburgh	3–9	4–10	6–8	7–6–2	3–10–3	12–2	8–6–1	7–6	8–6	—	7–7	11–3
St. Louis	6–8	6–8	4–8–1	6–8	8–5–2	13–1	9–5–1	10–4	7–7	7–7	—	8–6
Washington	4–9–1	2–12–1	3–11	9–4	6–8–1	10–4	2–12	7–7	2–12	3–11	6–8	—

=== Notable transactions ===
- April 4, 1899: Pat Crisham and George Magoon were traded by the Superbas to the Baltimore Orioles for Aleck Smith.
- April 10, 1899: Dan McFarlan was assigned to the Superbas by the Baltimore Orioles.
- April 25, 1899: Pete Cassidy, Mike Heydon, Dan McFarlan and cash were traded by the Superbas to the Washington Senators for Doc Casey and Duke Farrell.
- July 14, 1899: Dan McGann and Aleck Smith were traded by the Superbas to the Washington Senators for Deacon McGuire.
- August 3, 1899: Hughie Jennings was traded by the Superbas to the Baltimore Orioles for Gene DeMontreville and Jerry Nops.
- August 8, 1899: Gene DeMontreville and Jerry Nops were traded by the Superbas back to the Orioles for Hughie Jennings, undoing the trade of August 3.

=== Roster ===
1899 Brooklyn Superbas
Roster
Pitchers: Bill Donovan; Jack Dunn; Welcome Gaston; Bill Hill; Jay Hughes; Brickyard Kennedy; Frank Kitson; Al Maul; Dan McFarlan; Doc McJames; Bill Reidy	Catchers: Duke Farrell; John Grim; Deacon McGuire; Aleck Smith; Infielders: Erve Beck; Doc Casey; Pete Cassidy; Bill Dahlen; Tom Daly; Hughie Jennings; Dan McGann; Zeke Wrigley; Joe Yeager	Outfielders: John Anderson; Fielder Jones; Willie Keeler; Joe Kelley	Manager: Ned Hanlon

== Player stats ==
=== Batting ===
==== Starters by position ====
Note: Pos = Position; G = Games played; AB = At bats; R = Runs; H = Hits; Avg. = Batting average; HR = Home runs; RBI = Runs batted in; SB = Stolen bases

Pos	Player	G	AB	R	H	Avg.	HR	RBI	SB
C	Duke Farrell	80	254	40	76	.299	2	55	6
1B	Dan McGann	63	214	49	52	.243	2	32	16
2B	Tom Daly	141	498	95	156	.313	5	88	43
3B	Doc Casey	134	525	75	141	.269	1	43	27
SS	Bill Dahlen	121	428	87	121	.283	4	76	29
OF	Joe Kelley	143	538	108	175	.325	6	93	31
OF	Willie Keeler	141	570	140	216	.379	1	61	45
OF	Fielder Jones	102	365	75	104	.285	2	38	18

==== Other batters ====
Note: G = Games played; AB = At bats; R = Runs; H = Hits; Avg. = Batting average; HR = Home runs; RBI = Runs batted in; SB = Stolen bases

Player	G	AB	R	H	Avg.	HR	RBI	SB
John Anderson	117	439	65	118	.269	4	92	25
Hughie Jennings	67	198	42	64	.323	1	40	18
Deacon McGuire	46	157	22	50	.318	0	23	4
Aleck Smith	17	61	6	11	.180	0	6	0
Zeke Wrigley	15	49	4	10	.204	0	11	2
John Grim	15	47	3	13	.277	0	7	0
Joe Yeager	23	47	12	9	.191	0	4	0
Erve Beck	8	24	2	4	.167	0	2	0
Pete Cassidy	6	20	2	3	.150	0	4	1

=== Pitching ===
==== Starting pitchers ====
Note: G = Games pitched; GS = Games started; CG = Complete games; IP = Innings pitched; W = Wins; L = Losses; ERA = Earned run average; BB = Bases on balls; SO = Strikeouts

Player	G	GS	CG	IP	W	L	ERA	BB	SO
Jack Dunn	41	34	29	299.1	23	13	3.70	86	46
Jay Hughes	35	35	30	291.2	28	6	2.68	119	99
Brickyard Kennedy	40	33	27	277.1	22	9	2.79	86	55
Doc McJames	37	34	27	275.1	19	15	3.50	122	105
Al Maul	4	4	2	26.0	2	0	4.50	6	2

==== Other pitchers ====
Note: G = Games pitched; GS = Games started; CG = Complete games; IP = Innings pitched; W = Wins; L = Losses; ERA = Earned run average; BB = Bases on balls; SO = Strikeouts

Player	G	GS	CG	IP	W	L	ERA	BB	SO
Joe Yeager	10	4	2	47.2	2	2	4.72	16	6
Bill Donovan	5	2	2	25.0	1	2	4.32	13	11
Bill Hill	2	1	1	11.0	1	0	0.82	6	3
Bill Reidy	2	1	1	7.0	1	0	2.57	2	2

==== Relief pitchers ====
Note: G = Games pitched; IP = Innings pitched; W = Wins; L = Losses; SV = Saves; ERA = Earned run average; BB = Bases on balls; SO = Strikeouts

Player	G	IP	W	L	SV	ERA	BB	SO
Dan McFarlan	1	6.0	0	0	0	1.50	3	0
Welcome Gaston	1	3.0	0	0	0	3.86	4	0
