= 1899 Philadelphia Phillies season =

National League season

1899 Philadelphia Phillies
- League: National League
- Ballpark: National League Park
- City: Philadelphia, Pennsylvania
- Record: 94–58 (.618)
- League place: 3rd
- Owners: Al Reach, John Rogers
- Managers: Bill Shettsline

The following lists the events of the 1899 Philadelphia Phillies season.

== Preseason ==
The Phillies held spring training in 1899 in Charlotte, North Carolina where the team practiced and played exhibition games at the Latta Park Baseball Field. The team boarded and made its headquarters at the Central Hotel. On Easter Sunday, April 2, the team attended services at St. Peter's Catholic Church. It was the first season the Phillies trained in Charlotte and the team's first at the Latta Park Baseball Field.

== Regular season ==
=== Season standings ===
National League
Team	W	L	Pct.	GB	Home	Road
Brooklyn Superbas	101	47	.682	—	61‍–‍16	40‍–‍31
Boston Beaneaters	95	57	.625	8	53‍–‍26	42‍–‍31
Philadelphia Phillies	94	58	.618	9	58‍–‍25	36‍–‍33
Baltimore Orioles	86	62	.581	15	51‍–‍24	35‍–‍38
St. Louis Perfectos	84	67	.556	18½	50‍–‍33	34‍–‍34
Cincinnati Reds	83	67	.553	19	57‍–‍29	26‍–‍38
Pittsburgh Pirates	76	73	.510	25½	49‍–‍34	27‍–‍39
Chicago Orphans	75	73	.507	26	44‍–‍39	31‍–‍34
Louisville Colonels	75	77	.493	28	33‍–‍28	42‍–‍49
New York Giants	60	90	.400	42	35‍–‍38	25‍–‍52
Washington Senators	54	98	.355	49	35‍–‍43	19‍–‍55
Cleveland Spiders	20	134	.130	84	9‍–‍33	11‍–‍101

=== Record vs. opponents ===
1899 National League record Sources:
Team	BAL	BSN	BRO	CHI	CIN	CLE	LOU	NYG	PHI	PIT	STL	WAS
Baltimore	—	7–7	6–8	9–5	4–9	12–2	6–7–2	10–4	6–7–1	9–3	8–6	9–4–1
Boston	7–7	—	6–8	5–7	10–4	11–3	9–5	12–2	5–9	10–4	8–6	12–2–1
Brooklyn	8–6	8–6	—	8–5–1	7–6	14–0	11–3	10–4	8–6	8–6	8–4–1	11–3
Chicago	5–9	7–5	5–8–1	—	8–6	13–1	7–7	7–6–1	5–9	6–7–2	8–6	4–9
Cincinnati	9–4	4–10	6–7	6–8	—	14–0	8–6	9–5–1	4–10	10–3–3	5–8–2	8–6–1
Cleveland	2–12	3–11	0–14	1–13	0–14	—	4–10	1–13	2–12	2–12	1–13	4–10
Louisville	7–6–2	5–9	3–11	7–7	6–8	10–4	—	7–7	7–6	6–8–1	5–9–1	12–2
New York	4–10	2–12	2–10	6–7–1	5–9–1	13–1	7–7	—	4–10–1	6–7	4–10	7–7
Philadelphia	7–6–1	9–5	6–8	9–5	10–4	12–2	6–7	10–4–1	—	6–8	7–7	12–2
Pittsburgh	3–9	4–10	6–8	7–6–2	3–10–3	12–2	8–6–1	7–6	8–6	—	7–7	11–3
St. Louis	6–8	6–8	4–8–1	6–8	8–5–2	13–1	9–5–1	10–4	7–7	7–7	—	8–6
Washington	4–9–1	2–12–1	3–11	9–4	6–8–1	10–4	2–12	7–7	2–12	3–11	6–8	—

=== Roster ===
1899 Philadelphia Phillies
Roster
Pitchers: Bill Bernhard; Red Donahue; Jack Fifield; Chick Fraser; Bill Magee; Al Orth; Wiley Piatt; George Wheeler	Catchers: Klondike Douglass; Ed McFarland; Infielders: Duff Cooley; Harry Croft; Monte Cross; Joe Dolan; Dave Fultz; Billy Goeckel; Nap Lajoie; Billy Lauder; Red Owens	Outfielders: Pearce Chiles; Ed Delahanty; Elmer Flick; Roy Thomas	Manager: Bill Shettsline

== Player stats ==
=== Batting ===
==== Starters by position ====
Note: Pos = Position; G = Games played; AB = At bats; H = Hits; Avg. = Batting average; HR = Home runs; RBI = Runs batted in

Pos	Player	G	AB	H	Avg.	HR	RBI
C	Ed McFarland	96	324	108	.333	2	57
1B	Duff Cooley	94	406	112	.276	1	31
2B	Nap Lajoie	77	312	118	.378	6	70
SS	Monte Cross	154	557	143	.257	3	65
3B	Billy Lauder	151	583	156	.268	3	90
OF	Roy Thomas	150	547	178	.325	0	47
OF	Elmer Flick	127	485	166	.342	2	98
OF	Ed Delahanty	146	581	238	.410	9	137

==== Other batters ====
Note: G = Games played; AB = At bats; H = Hits; Avg. = Batting average; HR = Home runs; RBI = Runs batted in

Player	G	AB	H	Avg.	HR	RBI
Pearce Chiles	97	338	108	.320	2	76
Klondike Douglass	77	275	70	.255	0	27
Joe Dolan	61	222	57	.257	1	30
Billy Goeckel	37	141	37	.262	0	16
Red Owens	8	21	1	.048	0	1
Harry Croft	2	7	1	.143	0	0
Dave Fultz	2	5	2	.400	0	0

=== Pitching ===
==== Starting pitchers ====
Note: G = Games pitched; IP = Innings pitched; W = Wins; L = Losses; ERA = Earned run average; SO = Strikeouts

Player	G	IP	W	L	ERA	SO
Wiley Piatt	39	305.0	23	15	3.45	89
Red Donahue	35	279.0	21	8	3.39	51
Chick Fraser	35	270.2	21	12	3.36	68
Al Orth	21	144.2	14	3	2.49	35
Jack Fifield	14	92.2	3	8	4.08	8
Bill Magee	9	70.0	3	5	5.66	4
George Wheeler	6	39.0	3	1	6.00	3

==== Other pitchers ====
Note: G = Games pitched; IP = Innings pitched; W = Wins; L = Losses; ERA = Earned run average; SO = Strikeouts

Player	G	IP	W	L	ERA	SO
Bill Bernhard	21	132.1	6	6	2.65	23
