= 1899 Pittsburgh Pirates season =

1899 Pittsburgh Pirates
- League: National League
- Ballpark: Exposition Park
- City: Allegheny, Pennsylvania
- Record: 76–73 (.510)
- League place: 7th
- Owners: William Kerr and Phil Auten
- Managers: Bill Watkins, Patsy Donovan

The 1899 Pittsburgh (Note: Until early in the 20th century, the name of Pittsburgh was spelled both with and without the final 'h'.) Pirates season was the 18th season of the Pittsburgh Pirates franchise and their 13th in the National League. The Pirates finished seventh in the National League with a record of 76–73.

== Regular season ==
=== Season standings ===
National League
Team	W	L	Pct.	GB	Home	Road
Brooklyn Superbas	101	47	.682	—	61‍–‍16	40‍–‍31
Boston Beaneaters	95	57	.625	8	53‍–‍26	42‍–‍31
Philadelphia Phillies	94	58	.618	9	58‍–‍25	36‍–‍33
Baltimore Orioles	86	62	.581	15	51‍–‍24	35‍–‍38
St. Louis Perfectos	84	67	.556	18½	50‍–‍33	34‍–‍34
Cincinnati Reds	83	67	.553	19	57‍–‍29	26‍–‍38
Pittsburgh Pirates	76	73	.510	25½	49‍–‍34	27‍–‍39
Chicago Orphans	75	73	.507	26	44‍–‍39	31‍–‍34
Louisville Colonels	75	77	.493	28	33‍–‍28	42‍–‍49
New York Giants	60	90	.400	42	35‍–‍38	25‍–‍52
Washington Senators	54	98	.355	49	35‍–‍43	19‍–‍55
Cleveland Spiders	20	134	.130	84	9‍–‍33	11‍–‍101

=== Record vs. opponents ===
1899 National League record Sources:
Team	BAL	BSN	BRO	CHI	CIN	CLE	LOU	NYG	PHI	PIT	STL	WAS
Baltimore	—	7–7	6–8	9–5	4–9	12–2	6–7–2	10–4	6–7–1	9–3	8–6	9–4–1
Boston	7–7	—	6–8	5–7	10–4	11–3	9–5	12–2	5–9	10–4	8–6	12–2–1
Brooklyn	8–6	8–6	—	8–5–1	7–6	14–0	11–3	10–4	8–6	8–6	8–4–1	11–3
Chicago	5–9	7–5	5–8–1	—	8–6	13–1	7–7	7–6–1	5–9	6–7–2	8–6	4–9
Cincinnati	9–4	4–10	6–7	6–8	—	14–0	8–6	9–5–1	4–10	10–3–3	5–8–2	8–6–1
Cleveland	2–12	3–11	0–14	1–13	0–14	—	4–10	1–13	2–12	2–12	1–13	4–10
Louisville	7–6–2	5–9	3–11	7–7	6–8	10–4	—	7–7	7–6	6–8–1	5–9–1	12–2
New York	4–10	2–12	2–10	6–7–1	5–9–1	13–1	7–7	—	4–10–1	6–7	4–10	7–7
Philadelphia	7–6–1	9–5	6–8	9–5	10–4	12–2	6–7	10–4–1	—	6–8	7–7	12–2
Pittsburgh	3–9	4–10	6–8	7–6–2	3–10–3	12–2	8–6–1	7–6	8–6	—	7–7	11–3
St. Louis	6–8	6–8	4–8–1	6–8	8–5–2	13–1	9–5–1	10–4	7–7	7–7	—	8–6
Washington	4–9–1	2–12–1	3–11	9–4	6–8–1	10–4	2–12	7–7	2–12	3–11	6–8	—

=== Roster ===
1899 Pittsburgh Pirates
Roster
Pitchers: Jack Chesbro; Jim Gardner; Chummy Gray; Bill Hoffer; Sam Leever; Jay Parker; Harley Payne; Rosie Rosebraugh; Tully Sparks; Jesse Tannehill	Catchers: Frank Bowerman; Pop Schriver; Infielders: Willie Clark; Pop Dillon; Bones Ely; George Fox; Art Madison; John O'Brien; Heinie Reitz; Heinie Smith; Jimmy Williams	Outfielders: Ginger Beaumont; Patsy Donovan; Jack McCarthy; Tom McCreery	Manager: Patsy Donovan

== Player stats ==
=== Batting ===
==== Starters by position ====
Note: Pos = Position; G = Games played; AB = At bats; H = Hits; Avg. = Batting average; HR = Home runs; RBI = Runs batted in

Pos	Player	G	AB	H	Avg.	HR	RBI
C	Frank Bowerman	110	427	111	.260	3	53
1B	Willie Clark	81	300	85	.283	0	44
2B	John O'Brien	79	279	63	.226	1	33
SS	Bones Ely	139	526	146	.278	3	72
3B	Jimmy Williams	153	621	220	.354	9	116
OF	Ginger Beaumont	111	437	154	.352	3	38
OF	Jack McCarthy	139	565	173	.306	4	69
OF	Patsy Donovan	121	531	156	.294	1	55

==== Other batters ====
Note: G = Games played; AB = At bats; H = Hits; Avg. = Batting average; HR = Home runs; RBI = Runs batted in

Player	G	AB	H	Avg.	HR	RBI
Tom McCreery	119	460	149	.324	3	65
Pop Schriver	92	302	85	.281	1	49
Heinie Reitz	35	133	35	.263	0	16
Pop Dillon	30	121	31	.256	0	20
Art Madison	42	118	32	.271	0	19
Heinie Smith	15	53	15	.283	0	12
George Fox	13	41	10	.244	1	3

=== Pitching ===
==== Starting pitchers ====
Note: G = Games pitched; IP = Innings pitched; W = Wins; L = Losses; ERA = Earned run average; SO = Strikeouts

Player	G	IP	W	L	ERA	SO
Sam Leever	51	379.0	21	23	3.18	121
Jesse Tannehill	41	322.0	24	14	2.82	65
Tully Sparks	28	170.0	8	6	3.86	53
Bill Hoffer	23	163.2	8	10	3.63	44
Jack Chesbro	19	149.0	6	9	4.11	28
Chummy Gray	9	70.2	3	3	3.44	9
Billy Rhines	9	54.0	4	4	6.00	6
Harley Payne	5	26.1	1	3	3.76	8
Rosie Rosebraugh	2	6.0	0	1	9.00	2
Jay Parker	1	0.0	0	0	inf	0

==== Other pitchers ====
Note: G = Games pitched; IP = Innings pitched; W = Wins; L = Losses; ERA = Earned run average; SO = Strikeouts

Player	G	IP	W	L	ERA	SO
Jim Gardner	6	32.1	1	0	7.52	2

'
