= 1899 Boston Beaneaters season =

1899 Boston Beaneaters
- League: National League
- Ballpark: South End Grounds
- City: Boston, Massachusetts
- Record: 95–57–1 (.625)
- League place: 2nd
- Owners: Arthur Soden
- Managers: Frank Selee (10th season)

The 1899 Boston Beaneaters season was the 29th season of the franchise. The Beaneaters had a record of 95–57–1 (.625), finishing second in the National League and 8.0 games behind the first-place Brooklyn Superbas.

== Regular season ==
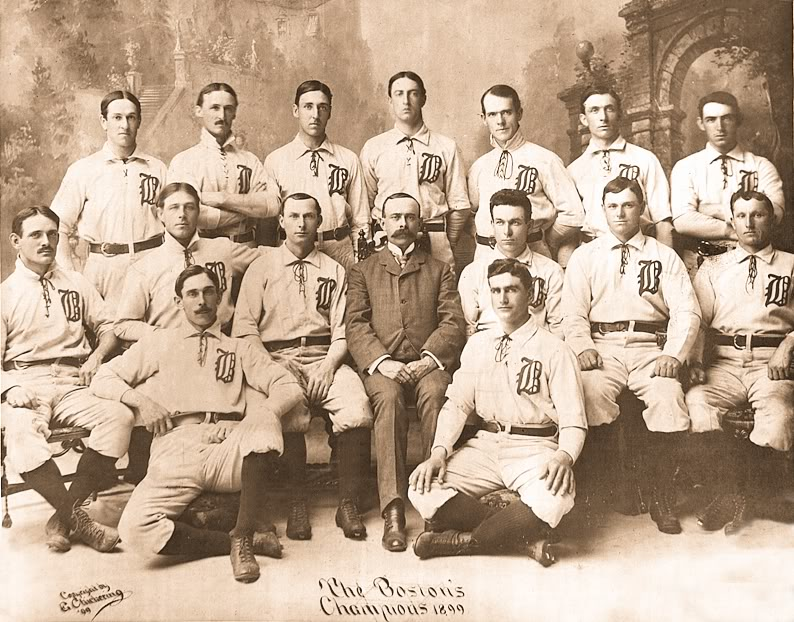
Team photograph

=== Season standings ===
National League
| Team | W | L | Pct. | GB | Home | Road |
|---|---|---|---|---|---|---|
| Brooklyn Superbas | 101 | 47 | .682 | — | 61‍–‍16 | 40‍–‍31 |
| Boston Beaneaters | 95 | 57 | .625 | 8 | 53‍–‍26 | 42‍–‍31 |
| Philadelphia Phillies | 94 | 58 | .618 | 9 | 58‍–‍25 | 36‍–‍33 |
| Baltimore Orioles | 86 | 62 | .581 | 15 | 51‍–‍24 | 35‍–‍38 |
| St. Louis Perfectos | 84 | 67 | .556 | 18½ | 50‍–‍33 | 34‍–‍34 |
| Cincinnati Reds | 83 | 67 | .553 | 19 | 57‍–‍29 | 26‍–‍38 |
| Pittsburgh Pirates | 76 | 73 | .510 | 25½ | 49‍–‍34 | 27‍–‍39 |
| Chicago Orphans | 75 | 73 | .507 | 26 | 44‍–‍39 | 31‍–‍34 |
| Louisville Colonels | 75 | 77 | .493 | 28 | 33‍–‍28 | 42‍–‍49 |
| New York Giants | 60 | 90 | .400 | 42 | 35‍–‍38 | 25‍–‍52 |
| Washington Senators | 54 | 98 | .355 | 49 | 35‍–‍43 | 19‍–‍55 |
| Cleveland Spiders | 20 | 134 | .130 | 84 | 9‍–‍33 | 11‍–‍101 |

=== Record vs. opponents ===
1899 National League record Sources:
| Team | BAL | BSN | BRO | CHI | CIN | CLE | LOU | NYG | PHI | PIT | STL | WAS |
|---|---|---|---|---|---|---|---|---|---|---|---|---|
| Baltimore | — | 7–7 | 6–8 | 9–5 | 4–9 | 12–2 | 6–7–2 | 10–4 | 6–7–1 | 9–3 | 8–6 | 9–4–1 |
| Boston | 7–7 | — | 6–8 | 5–7 | 10–4 | 11–3 | 9–5 | 12–2 | 5–9 | 10–4 | 8–6 | 12–2–1 |
| Brooklyn | 8–6 | 8–6 | — | 8–5–1 | 7–6 | 14–0 | 11–3 | 10–4 | 8–6 | 8–6 | 8–4–1 | 11–3 |
| Chicago | 5–9 | 7–5 | 5–8–1 | — | 8–6 | 13–1 | 7–7 | 7–6–1 | 5–9 | 6–7–2 | 8–6 | 4–9 |
| Cincinnati | 9–4 | 4–10 | 6–7 | 6–8 | — | 14–0 | 8–6 | 9–5–1 | 4–10 | 10–3–3 | 5–8–2 | 8–6–1 |
| Cleveland | 2–12 | 3–11 | 0–14 | 1–13 | 0–14 | — | 4–10 | 1–13 | 2–12 | 2–12 | 1–13 | 4–10 |
| Louisville | 7–6–2 | 5–9 | 3–11 | 7–7 | 6–8 | 10–4 | — | 7–7 | 7–6 | 6–8–1 | 5–9–1 | 12–2 |
| New York | 4–10 | 2–12 | 2–10 | 6–7–1 | 5–9–1 | 13–1 | 7–7 | — | 4–10–1 | 6–7 | 4–10 | 7–7 |
| Philadelphia | 7–6–1 | 9–5 | 6–8 | 9–5 | 10–4 | 12–2 | 6–7 | 10–4–1 | — | 6–8 | 7–7 | 12–2 |
| Pittsburgh | 3–9 | 4–10 | 6–8 | 7–6–2 | 3–10–3 | 12–2 | 8–6–1 | 7–6 | 8–6 | — | 7–7 | 11–3 |
| St. Louis | 6–8 | 6–8 | 4–8–1 | 6–8 | 8–5–2 | 13–1 | 9–5–1 | 10–4 | 7–7 | 7–7 | — | 8–6 |
| Washington | 4–9–1 | 2–12–1 | 3–11 | 9–4 | 6–8–1 | 10–4 | 2–12 | 7–7 | 2–12 | 3–11 | 6–8 | — |

=== Roster ===
1899 Boston Beaneaters
Roster
| Pitchers: Harvey Bailey; Billy Ging; Charlie Hickman; Frank Killen; Fred Klobedanz; Ted Lewis; Jouett Meekin; Kid Nichols; Oscar Streit; Mike Sullivan; Vic Willis | Catchers: Marty Bergen; Boileryard Clarke; Bill Merritt; Billy Sullivan; Infielders: Jimmy Collins; Mike Hickey; Charlie Kuhns; Herman Long; Bobby Lowe; Fred Tenney | Outfielders: Hugh Duffy; Charlie Frisbee; Billy Hamilton; General Stafford; Chick Stahl; George Yeager | Manager: Frank Selee |

== Player stats ==
=== Batting ===
==== Starters by position ====
Note: Pos = Position; G = Games played; AB = At bats; H = Hits; Avg. = Batting average; HR = Home runs; RBI = Runs batted in

| Pos | Player | G | AB | H | Avg. | HR | RBI |
|---|---|---|---|---|---|---|---|
| C | Marty Bergen | 72 | 260 | 67 | .258 | 1 | 34 |
| 1B | Fred Tenney | 150 | 603 | 209 | .347 | 1 | 67 |
| 2B | Bobby Lowe | 152 | 559 | 152 | .272 | 4 | 88 |
| SS | Herman Long | 145 | 578 | 153 | .265 | 6 | 100 |
| 3B | Jimmy Collins | 151 | 599 | 166 | .277 | 5 | 92 |
| OF | Hugh Duffy | 147 | 588 | 164 | .279 | 5 | 102 |
| OF | Chick Stahl | 148 | 576 | 202 | .351 | 7 | 52 |
| OF | Billy Hamilton | 84 | 297 | 92 | .310 | 1 | 33 |

==== Other batters ====
Note: G = Games played; AB = At bats; H = Hits; Avg. = Batting average; HR = Home runs; RBI = Runs batted in

| Player | G | AB | H | Avg. | HR | RBI |
|---|---|---|---|---|---|---|
| Boileryard Clarke | 60 | 223 | 50 | .224 | 2 | 32 |
| General Stafford | 55 | 182 | 55 | .302 | 3 | 40 |
| Charlie Frisbee | 42 | 152 | 50 | .329 | 0 | 20 |
| Billy Sullivan | 22 | 74 | 20 | .270 | 2 | 12 |
| Charlie Hickman | 19 | 63 | 25 | .397 | 0 | 15 |
| Charlie Kuhns | 7 | 18 | 5 | .278 | 0 | 3 |
| George Yeager | 3 | 8 | 1 | .125 | 0 | 0 |
| Mike Hickey | 1 | 3 | 1 | .333 | 0 | 0 |
| Bill Merritt | 1 | 2 | 0 | .000 | 0 | 0 |

=== Pitching ===
==== Starting pitchers ====
Note: G = Games pitched; IP = Innings pitched; W = Wins; L = Losses; ERA = Earned run average; SO = Strikeouts

| Player | G | IP | W | L | ERA | SO |
|---|---|---|---|---|---|---|
| Kid Nichols | 42 | 343.1 | 21 | 19 | 2.99 | 108 |
| Vic Willis | 41 | 342.2 | 27 | 8 | 2.50 | 120 |
| Ted Lewis | 29 | 234.2 | 17 | 11 | 3.49 | 60 |
| Jouett Meekin | 13 | 108.0 | 7 | 6 | 2.83 | 23 |
| Frank Killen | 12 | 99.1 | 7 | 5 | 4.26 | 23 |
| Harvey Bailey | 12 | 86.2 | 6 | 4 | 3.95 | 26 |
| Charlie Hickman | 11 | 66.1 | 6 | 0 | 4.48 | 14 |
| Fred Klobedanz | 5 | 33.1 | 1 | 4 | 4.86 | 8 |
| Mike Sullivan | 1 | 9.0 | 1 | 0 | 6.75 | 0 |
| Billy Ging | 1 | 8.0 | 1 | 0 | 1.13 | 2 |

==== Other pitchers ====
Note: G = Games pitched; IP = Innings pitched; W = Wins; L = Losses; ERA = Earned run average; SO = Strikeouts

| Player | G | IP | W | L | ERA | SO |
|---|---|---|---|---|---|---|
| Oscar Streit | 2 | 14.2 | 1 | 0 | 6.75 | 0 |

==== Relief pitchers ====
Note: G = Games pitched; W = Wins; L = Losses; SV = Saves; ERA = Earned run average; SO = Strikeouts

| Player | G | W | L | SV | ERA | SO |
|---|---|---|---|---|---|---|
| Chick Stahl | 1 | 0 | 0 | 0 | 9.00 | 0 |
