= 1899 St. Louis Perfectos season =

Major League Baseball season

1899 St. Louis Perfectos
- League: National League
- Ballpark: League Park
- City: St. Louis, Missouri
- Record: 84–67 (.556)
- League place: 5th
- Owners: Frank Robison and Stanley Robison
- Managers: Patsy Tebeau

The 1899 St. Louis Perfectos season was the team's 18th season in St. Louis, Missouri and their eighth season in the National League. The Perfectos went 84–67 during the season and finished fifth in the National League.

This was the team's only season in which they were named the Perfectos. The Robison brothers, who had just bought the team from original owner Chris von der Ahe, changed the colors to red, the name of the team to Perfectos, and the name of the ballpark to League Park. The red color proved so popular that fans and sportswriters began referring to the team by the shade of red, cardinal. The next season, the team officially became the Cardinals.

The team benefited from many players who were transferred to the team from the Cleveland Spiders, which were also owned by the Robison brothers. This led to the Spiders compiling the worst season in MLB history, losing 134 games. However, the Perfectos wound up finishing only fifth. The pennant-winning Brooklyn Superbas, who finished 18½ games ahead of St. Louis, benefited from a similar arrangement, as Brooklyn's owners also owned the Baltimore Orioles, allowing them to also transfer their better players to one team. After the 1899 season, such arrangements were outlawed in the National League, and both the Spiders and Orioles were among four teams eliminated from the league.

NOTE: The "Perfectos" nickname was never official and it certainly didn't originate with the ownership (Robison brothers). Contemporary sources confirm the name was sarcastic and bestowed by the local cadre of base ball writers as a pejorative reference to their preseason over-optimism and the fact that so many new players came to St. Louis from the 1898 Cleveland Spiders, which was a historically poor-performing team also owned by the Robison Brothers. Naturally, the team finished 5th, albeit with a winning record. Credit for the accuracy on the etymology of the team nickname goes to Jerry Vickery, who was the original curator of the Cardinals Museum and Hall of Fame. Jerry had a deep friendship with legendary Hall of Fame sportswriter Bob Broeg. Broeg carried the story forward from his relationship with another Hall of Fame base ball writer from St. Louis, J. Roy Stockton, who covered the Cardinals from 1915 to 1958. Stockton also wrote for The Sporting News (based in StL) and had a relationship with the Spink Brothers, who covered the 1899 St. Louis National League team.

== Offseason ==
=== Notable transactions ===
- March 29, 1899: Jack O'Connor was assigned to the Perfectos by the Cleveland Spiders.

== Regular season ==
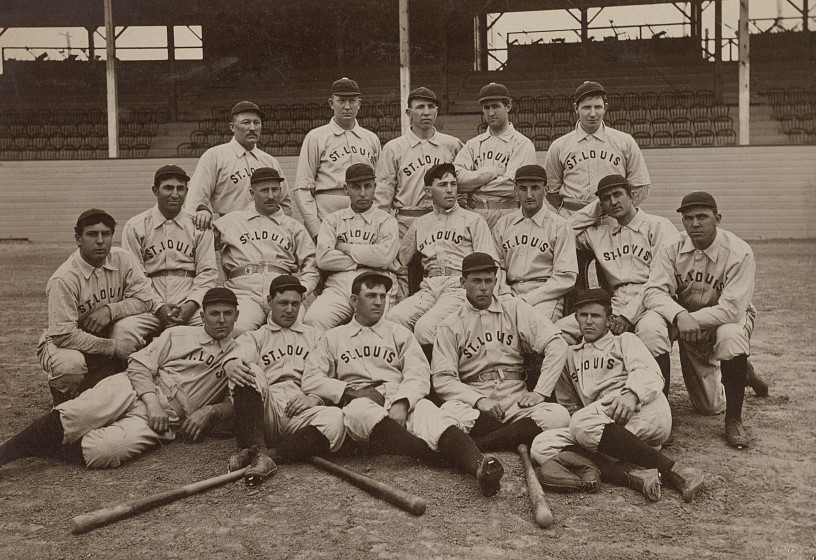
1899 St. Louis Perfectos

=== Season standings ===
National League
Team	W	L	Pct.	GB	Home	Road
Brooklyn Superbas	101	47	.682	—	61‍–‍16	40‍–‍31
Boston Beaneaters	95	57	.625	8	53‍–‍26	42‍–‍31
Philadelphia Phillies	94	58	.618	9	58‍–‍25	36‍–‍33
Baltimore Orioles	86	62	.581	15	51‍–‍24	35‍–‍38
St. Louis Perfectos	84	67	.556	18½	50‍–‍33	34‍–‍34
Cincinnati Reds	83	67	.553	19	57‍–‍29	26‍–‍38
Pittsburgh Pirates	76	73	.510	25½	49‍–‍34	27‍–‍39
Chicago Orphans	75	73	.507	26	44‍–‍39	31‍–‍34
Louisville Colonels	75	77	.493	28	33‍–‍28	42‍–‍49
New York Giants	60	90	.400	42	35‍–‍38	25‍–‍52
Washington Senators	54	98	.355	49	35‍–‍43	19‍–‍55
Cleveland Spiders	20	134	.130	84	9‍–‍33	11‍–‍101

=== Record vs. opponents ===
1899 National League record Sources:
Team	BAL	BSN	BRO	CHI	CIN	CLE	LOU	NYG	PHI	PIT	STL	WAS
Baltimore	—	7–7	6–8	9–5	4–9	12–2	6–7–2	10–4	6–7–1	9–3	8–6	9–4–1
Boston	7–7	—	6–8	5–7	10–4	11–3	9–5	12–2	5–9	10–4	8–6	12–2–1
Brooklyn	8–6	8–6	—	8–5–1	7–6	14–0	11–3	10–4	8–6	8–6	8–4–1	11–3
Chicago	5–9	7–5	5–8–1	—	8–6	13–1	7–7	7–6–1	5–9	6–7–2	8–6	4–9
Cincinnati	9–4	4–10	6–7	6–8	—	14–0	8–6	9–5–1	4–10	10–3–3	5–8–2	8–6–1
Cleveland	2–12	3–11	0–14	1–13	0–14	—	4–10	1–13	2–12	2–12	1–13	4–10
Louisville	7–6–2	5–9	3–11	7–7	6–8	10–4	—	7–7	7–6	6–8–1	5–9–1	12–2
New York	4–10	2–12	2–10	6–7–1	5–9–1	13–1	7–7	—	4–10–1	6–7	4–10	7–7
Philadelphia	7–6–1	9–5	6–8	9–5	10–4	12–2	6–7	10–4–1	—	6–8	7–7	12–2
Pittsburgh	3–9	4–10	6–8	7–6–2	3–10–3	12–2	8–6–1	7–6	8–6	—	7–7	11–3
St. Louis	6–8	6–8	4–8–1	6–8	8–5–2	13–1	9–5–1	10–4	7–7	7–7	—	8–6
Washington	4–9–1	2–12–1	3–11	9–4	6–8–1	10–4	2–12	7–7	2–12	3–11	6–8	—

=== Roster ===
1899 St. Louis Perfectos
Roster
Pitchers: Frank Bates; George Cuppy; Cowboy Jones; Pete McBride; Jack Powell; Willie Sudhoff; Jack Sutthoff; Tom Thomas; Zeke Wilson; Cy Young	Catchers: Fritz Buelow; Lou Criger; Jack O'Connor; Infielders: Jimmy Burke; Cupid Childs; Lave Cross; Tim Flood; Ed McKean; Freddy Parent; Ossee Schreckengost; Patsy Tebeau; Bobby Wallace	Outfielders: Harry Blake; Jesse Burkett; Mike Donlin; Emmet Heidrick; Charlie Hemphill; Dusty Miller; Jake Stenzel	Manager: Patsy Tebeau

== Player stats ==
=== Batting ===
==== Starters by position ====
Note: Pos = Position; G = Games played; AB = At bats; H = Hits; Avg. = Batting average; HR = Home runs; RBI = Runs batted in

Pos	Player	G	AB	H	Avg.	HR	RBI
C	Lou Criger	77	258	66	.256	2	44
1B	Patsy Tebeau	77	281	69	.246	1	26
2B	Cupid Childs	125	464	123	.265	1	48
3B	Lave Cross	103	403	122	.303	4	64
SS	Bobby Wallace	151	577	170	.295	12	108
OF	Emmet Heidrick	146	591	194	.328	2	82
OF	Jesse Burkett	141	558	221	.396	7	71
OF	Harry Blake	97	292	70	.240	2	41

==== Other batters ====
Note: G = Games played; AB = At bats; H = Hits; Avg. = Batting average; HR = Home runs; RBI = Runs batted in

Player	G	AB	H	Avg.	HR	RBI
Jack O'Connor	84	289	73	.253	0	43
Ed McKean	67	277	72	.260	3	40
Ossee Schreckengost	72	277	77	.278	2	37
Mike Donlin	66	266	86	.323	6	27
Jake Stenzel	35	128	35	.273	1	19
Dusty Miller	10	39	8	.205	0	3
Charlie Hemphill	11	37	9	.243	1	3
Tim Flood	10	31	9	.290	0	3
Fritz Buelow	7	15	7	.467	0	2
Freddy Parent	2	8	1	.125	0	1
Jimmy Burke	2	6	2	.333	0	0

=== Pitching ===
==== Starting pitchers ====
Note: G = Games pitched; IP = Innings pitched; W = Wins; L = Losses; ERA = Earned run average; SO = Strikeouts

Player	G	IP	W	L	ERA	SO
Jack Powell	48	373.0	23	19	3.52	87
Cy Young	44	369.1	26	16	2.58	111
Willie Sudhoff	26	189.1	13	10	3.61	33
George Cuppy	21	171.2	11	8	3.15	25
Cowboy Jones	12	85.1	6	5	3.59	28
Jack Sutthoff	2	13.0	0	2	10.38	4

==== Other pitchers ====
Note: G = Games pitched; IP = Innings pitched; W = Wins; L = Losses; ERA = Earned run average; SO = Strikeouts

Player	G	IP	W	L	ERA	SO
Pete McBride	11	64.0	2	4	4.08	26
Zeke Wilson	5	26.0	1	1	4.50	3
Tom Thomas	4	25.0	1	1	2.52	8
Mike Donlin	3	15.1	0	1	7.63	6

==== Relief pitchers ====
Note: G = Games pitched; W = Wins; L = Losses; SV = Saves; ERA = Earned run average; SO = Strikeouts

Player	G	W	L	SV	ERA	SO
Frank Bates	2	0	0	0	1.04	0
