= Tim Flood =

Tim Flood may refer to:

- Tim Flood (baseball) (1877–1929), baseball player
- Tim Flood (hurler) (1927–2014), Irish hurler
