= Oscar Streit =

American baseball player (1873–1935)

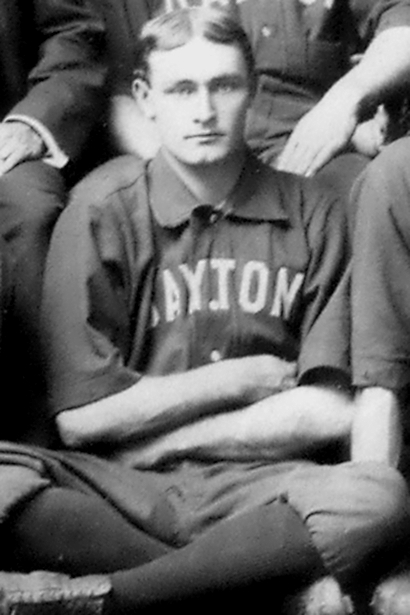
- Pitcher
- Born: July 7, 1873; Florence, Alabama, U.S.
- Died: March 16, 1935 (aged 61); Birmingham, Alabama, U.S.
- Batted: Left Threw: Left

MLB debut
- April 21, 1899, for the Boston Beaneaters

Last MLB appearance
- June 18, 1902, for the Cleveland Bronchos

MLB statistics
- Win–loss record: 1–7
- Earned run average: 5.56
- Strikeouts: 10
- Stats at Baseball Reference

Teams
- Boston Beaneaters (1899); Cleveland Bronchos (1902)

Oscar William Streit (July 7, 1873 – March 16, 1935) was an American Major League Baseball pitcher who played for two seasons. He played for the Boston Beaneaters in 1899 and the Cleveland Bronchos in 1902, pitching in ten career games.
