= Joe Dolan (baseball) =

American baseball player (1873–1938)

Joseph Dolan
- Shortstop
- Born: February 24, 1873; Baltimore, Maryland, U.S.
- Died: March 24, 1938 (aged 65); Omaha, Nebraska, U.S.
- Batted: Unknown Threw: Right

MLB debut
- August 11, 1896, for the Louisville Colonels

Last MLB appearance
- September 28, 1901, for the Philadelphia Athletics

MLB statistics
- Batting average: .214
- Home runs: 6
- Run batted in: 122
- Stats at Baseball Reference

Teams
- Louisville Colonels (1896–1897); Philadelphia Phillies (1899–1901); Philadelphia Athletics (1901)

Joseph Dolan (February 24, 1873 – March 24, 1938) was an American professional baseball player who played 323 games over a five-season major league career between 1896 and 1901. He was born in Baltimore, Maryland and died at the age of 65 in Omaha, Nebraska.

== Career ==
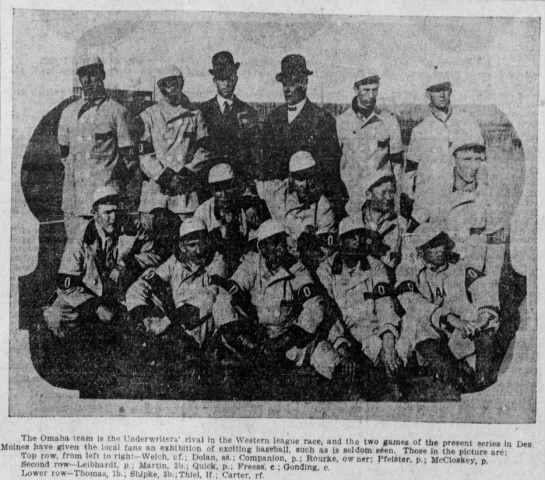
1905 Omaha Rourkes - back row, second from the left

Dolan played a total of 18 seasons including over 1,300 games in the minor leagues mostly at the Class A and D levels. Since Major League teams didn't begin affiliating league-wide with minor leagues teams until 1932, Dolan signed various contracts as a free agent with the Louisville Colonels (1896–97), Philadelphia Phillies (1899–1901), and Philadelphia Athletics (1901).

Although he'd play in 11 different minor league cities, he spent the bulk of his time, seven seasons, in Omaha where he also made his home after retiring. Interestingly, Omaha had no fewer than four nicknames during this time including the Omahogs, Indians, Rangers, and Rourkes.

After taking off a few years from baseball (he had retired in 1910), Dolan played one more season in 1913 for the Bangor Maroons at age 40. He batted .267 in 64 games (it was a 66-game season), but the league in which he played, the New Brunswick-Maine League, folded after only one season.
