= Billy Lauder =

American baseball player and coach (1874–1933)

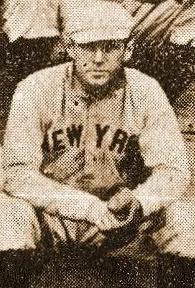
- Third baseman
- Born: February 23, 1874; New York, New York, U.S.
- Died: May 20, 1933 (aged 59); Norwalk, Connecticut, U.S.
- Batted: Right Threw: Right

MLB debut
- June 25, 1898, for the Philadelphia Phillies

Last MLB appearance
- September 26, 1903, for the New York Giants

MLB statistics
- Batting average: .261
- Home runs: 5
- Runs batted in: 253
- Stats at Baseball Reference

Teams
- Philadelphia Phillies (1898–1899); Philadelphia Athletics (1901); New York Giants (1902–1903)

William Lauder (February 23, 1874 – May 20, 1933) was an American professional baseball third baseman and coach. He played in Major League Baseball (MLB) for the Philadelphia Phillies, Philadelphia Athletics, and New York Giants.

== Career ==
After attending Brown University, Lauder began his Major League career on June 25, 1898 for the Phillies, replacing fellow rookie Kid Elberfeld as the Phillies third baseman. In 1898 he played in 97 games and got 95 hits in 361 at bats for a .263 batting average. He also had two home runs and 67 RBIs that season. In 1899, he played 151 games for the Phillies with 156 hits in 583 at bats for a batting average of .268, and 3 home runs, 90 RBIs and 74 runs scored. He recorded 210 putouts as a fielder, which remains one of the highest totals all time among Major League third basemen. He was 6th in the National League in games played and 9th in outs made.

After not playing the Majors in 1900, Lauder played two games for the Philadelphia Athletics in 1901, getting one hit in eight at bats. In 1902 and 1903 he played for the Giants. In 1902, he played in 125 games, getting 114 hits in 482 at bats for a .237 batting average. His 20 doubles ranked 9th in the National League. In 1903, his final Major League season, he played in 108 games, getting 111 hits in 395 for a .281 batting average. His 17 sacrifice hits ranked 9th in the National League. For his career, Lauder played in 483 Major League games, with 477 hits in 1829 at bats for a batting average of .261. He had 6 home runs, 253 RBIs, 210 runs scored, a .292 on-base percentage and a .321 slugging percentage. As a fielder, he handled 1801 chances, all but 7 at third base, with 190 errors for a fielding percentage of .895.

After his playing career ended, Lauder became a lawyer after studying law at Harvard University, wrote a baseball book, and ultimately became an insurance salesman. He also coached baseball at Williams College, Columbia University, and Yale University. At Columbia, he coached future Hall of Famer Eddie Collins, where he first recognized and Collins' Major League potential and encouraged him to pursue a baseball career. In 1925, when Collins was managing the Chicago White Sox, he hired Lauder as a White Sox coach.
