= Roy Evans (baseball) =

American baseball player (1874–1915)

- Pitcher
- Born: March 19, 1874; Knoxville, Tennessee, U.S.
- Died: Unknown; Unknown
- Batted: Right Threw: Right

MLB debut
- May 15, 1897, for the St. Louis Browns

Last MLB appearance
- August 1, 1903, for the St. Louis Browns

MLB statistics
- Win–loss record: 29–43
- Earned run average: 3.66
- Strikeouts: 211
- Stats at Baseball Reference

Teams
- St. Louis Browns (1897); Louisville Colonels (1897); Washington Senators (1898–1899); New York Giants (1902); Brooklyn Superbas (1902–1903); St. Louis Browns (1903)

Robert Roy Evans (born March 19, 1874) was an American professional baseball player, a pitcher in Major League Baseball. He pitched from 1897 to 1903 for six different franchises. He was a graduate of Emporia State University. He was best known for scamming teams out of their money.

He was thought to have died in the 1915 Galveston Hurricane in Texas, however five years later, he was sentenced to prison for bigamy and was apparently married to at least 4 different women all at once. His assumed death is long thought to have just been another ruse, although it has never been confirmed. He served about 19 months at Lavenworth before being released on June 22, 1922. It is unknown what happened to him after this.
