= Fred Ketchum =

American baseball player (1875–1908)

- Outfielder
- Born: July 27, 1875; Elmira, New York
- Died: March 12, 1908 (aged 32); Cortland, New York
- Batted: Left Threw: Right

MLB debut
- September 12, 1899, for the Louisville Colonels

Last MLB appearance
- May 4, 1901, for the Philadelphia Athletics

MLB statistics
- Batting average: .277
- Home runs: 0
- Runs batted in: 7
- Stats at Baseball Reference

Teams
- Louisville Colonels (1899); Philadelphia Athletics (1901)

Frederick L. Ketchum (July 27, 1875 – March 12, 1908) was an American Major League Baseball outfielder. He played for the Louisville Colonels during the 1899 season and the Philadelphia Athletics during the 1901 season.
