= Harry Wilhelm =

American baseball player (1874–1944)

- Pitcher
- Born: April 7, 1874; Uniontown, Pennsylvania, U.S.
- Died: February 20, 1944 (aged 69); Republic, Pennsylvania, U.S.
- Batted: Right Threw: Right

MLB debut
- August 12, 1899, for the Louisville Colonels

Last MLB appearance
- August 23, 1899, for the Louisville Colonels

MLB statistics
- Win–loss record: 1–1
- Earned run average: 6.12
- Strikeouts: 6
- Stats at Baseball Reference

Teams
- Louisville Colonels (1899)

Harry Lester Wilhelm (April 7, 1874 – February 20, 1944) was an American pitcher in Major League Baseball for the 1899 Louisville Colonels. He attended Westminster College.

He began his professional career with the Carlisle Colts and Chambersburg Maroons of the independent Cumberland Valley League in 1896. His best season in the minors was in 1899 when he had a record of 21–10 in 32 games for the Lancaster Maroons of the Atlantic League. While he was in the minors, he played a variety of positions. In addition to pitching as he did in the major leagues, he also played shortstop, left field and right field. His last season in the minor leagues was with the Albany Senators of the class B New York State League in 1903.
