= Willie Clark (baseball) =

American baseball player (1870–1932)

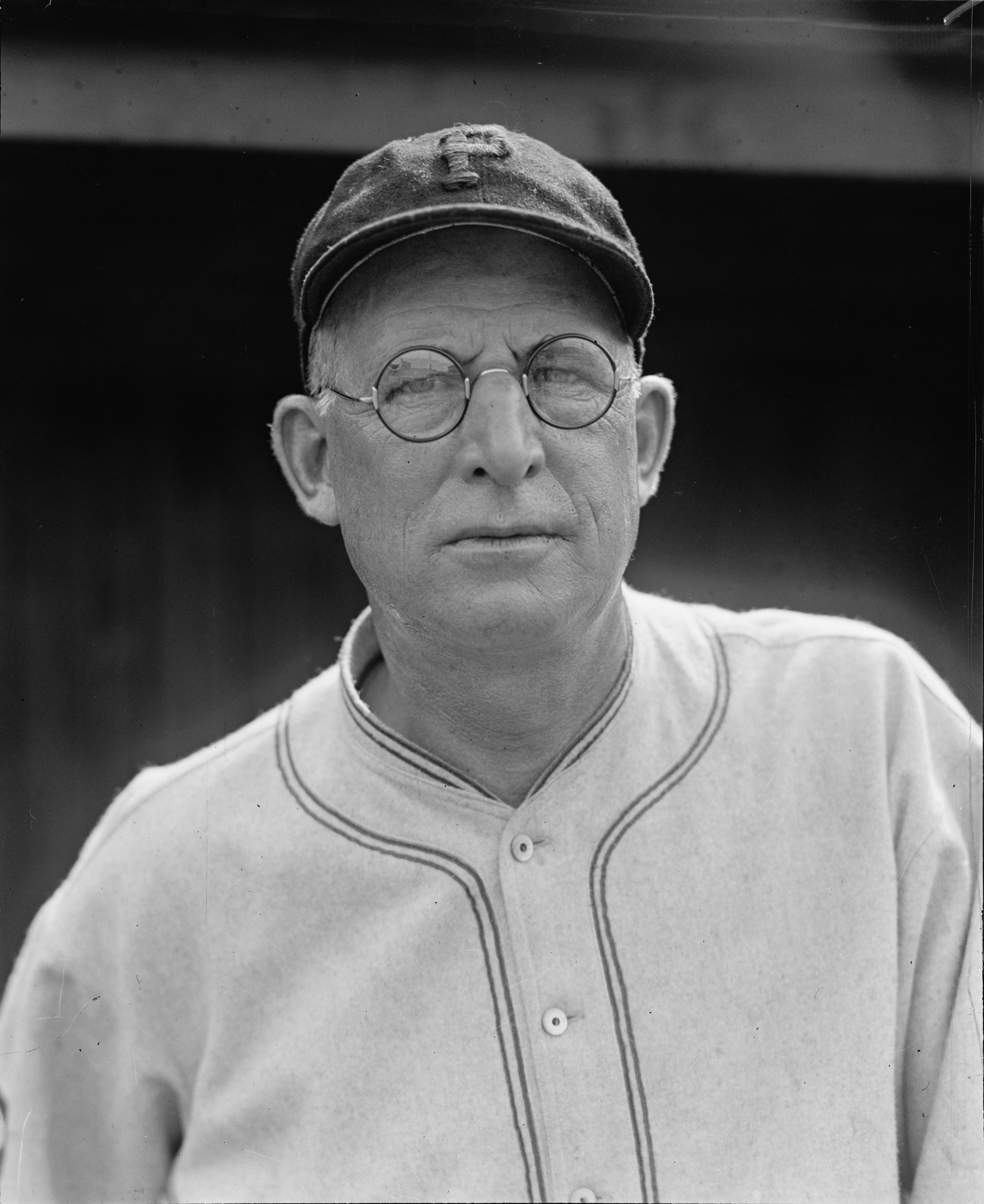
- First baseman
- Born: August 16, 1870; Pittsburgh, Pennsylvania, U.S.
- Died: November 13, 1932 (aged 62); Pittsburgh, Pennsylvania, U.S.
- Batted: Left Threw: Left

MLB debut
- June 20, 1895, for the New York Giants

Last MLB appearance
- August 3, 1899, for the Pittsburgh Pirates

MLB statistics
- Batting average: .286
- Home runs: 2
- Runs batted in: 199
- Stats at Baseball Reference

Teams
- New York Giants (1895–1897); Pittsburgh Pirates (1898–1899)

William Otis Clark (August 16, 1870 – November 13, 1932) was an American professional baseball first baseman for the New York Giants and Pittsburgh Pirates of Major League Baseball between 1895 and 1899.

In 350 games over five seasons, Clark posted a .286 batting average (366-for-1280) with 188 runs, 2 home runs and 199 RBI. He recorded a .983 fielding percentage as a first baseman.
