= Welcome Gaston =

American baseball player (1874–1944)

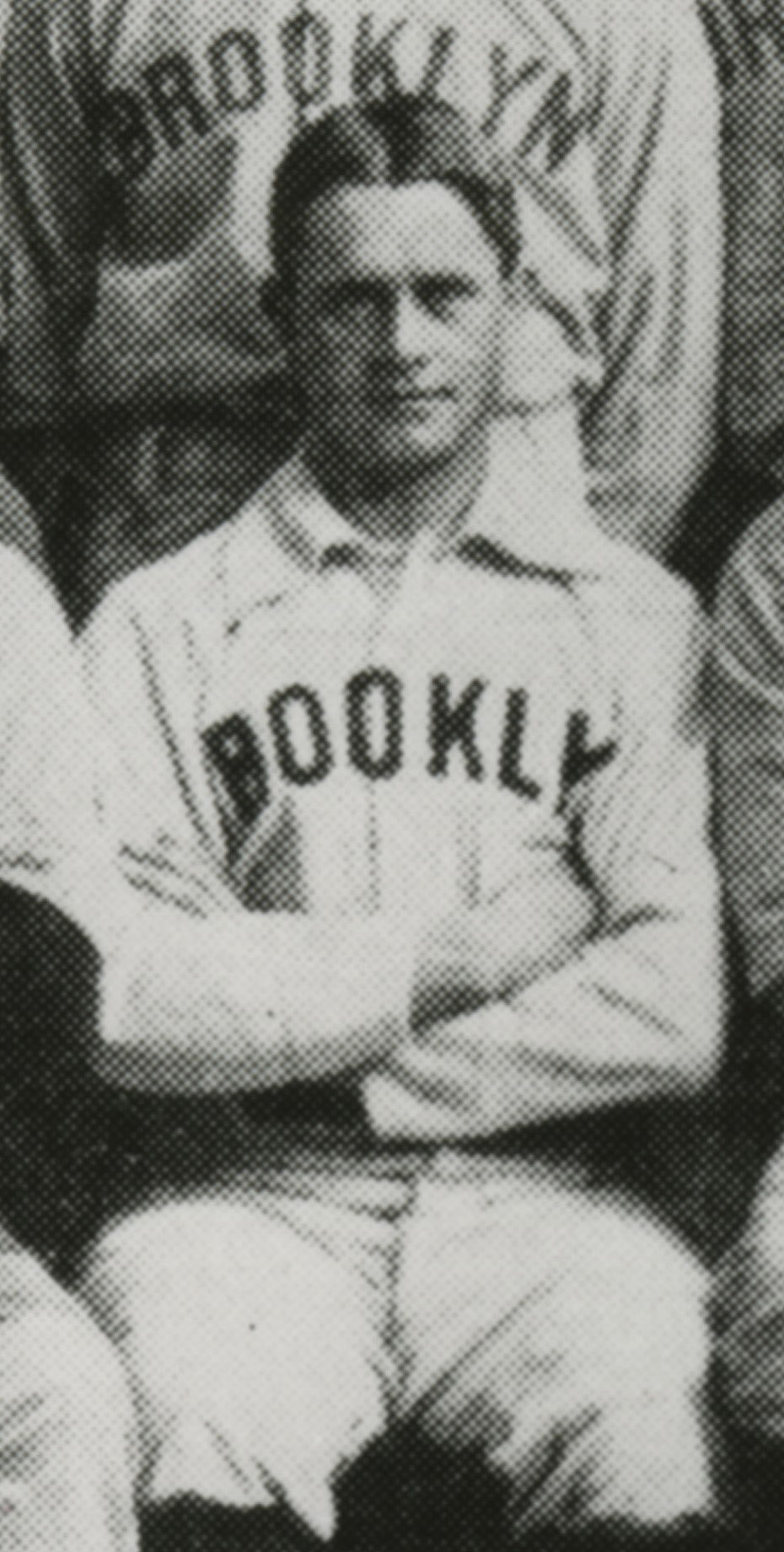
- Gaston in 1898
- Pitcher
- Born: December 19, 1874; Senecaville, Ohio, U.S.
- Died: December 13, 1944 (aged 69); Columbus, Ohio, U.S.
- Batted: Unknown Threw: Left

MLB debut
- October 6, 1898, for the Brooklyn Bridegrooms

Last MLB appearance
- September 25, 1899, for the Brooklyn Superbas

MLB statistics
- Win–loss record: 1–1
- Earned run average: 2.84
- Strikeouts: 0
- Stats at Baseball Reference

Teams
- Brooklyn Bridegrooms/Superbas (1898–1899)

Welcome Thornburg Gaston (December 19, 1874 – December 13, 1944) was an American pitcher in Major League Baseball. He played for the Brooklyn Bridegrooms/Superbas during parts of the 1898 and 1899 seasons.
