= 1899 Cincinnati Reds season =

1899 Cincinnati Reds
- League: National League
- Ballpark: League Park
- City: Cincinnati, Ohio
- Record: 83–67 (.553)
- League place: 6th
- Owners: John T. Brush
- Managers: Buck Ewing

The 1899 Cincinnati Reds season was a season in American baseball. The team finished in sixth place in the National League with a record of 83–67, 16 games behind the Brooklyn Superbas.

== Regular season ==
The Reds were coming off a successful season in 1898, earning a third-place finish with a 92–60 record. However, they once again faded down the stretch, as the team was in first place in the first week of September before slumping for the remainder of the season.

Buck Ewing returned to manage Cincinnati for a fifth season. The Reds also purchased Kip Selbach from the Washington Senators during the off-season for $5,000. Selbach batted .303 with three home runs and 60 RBI with the Senators in 1898. The club also acquired Bill Phillips, who spent the 1898 season with the Indianapolis Hoosiers of the Western League, where he had a 29–8 record. Phillips last played in the National League in 1895 with the Reds, going 6–7 with a 6.03 ERA. Twenty-year-old Noodles Hahn was also signed by Cincinnati, as he split the 1898 season with the Detroit Tigers and St. Paul Saints, going 12–20 between those two clubs.

Jake Beckley had another strong offensive season, batting .333 with three home runs and 99 RBI, all team highs. Kip Selbach batted .297 with three home runs and 87 RBI, and also scored a team-high 105 runs.

On the mound, Hahn was the ace, earning a 23–8 record with a 2.68 ERA in his rookie season. Hahn pitched a team high 309 innings, and struck out 145 batters. Phillips was also very solid, going 17–9 with a 3.32 ERA in 33 games.

=== Season summary ===
Cincinnati started the season off on the right foot, going 14–7 in their opening twenty-one games, only 1.5 games out of first. However, a 7–15 mark over their next twenty-two games saw the team fall under the .500 level with a 24–25 record, sitting in seventh place, 14.5 games behind the Brooklyn Superbas. The team would remain around the .500 mark, as they were 40–41, before going on a franchise record fourteen-game winning streak. Cincinnati's record improved to 54–41, however, they still remained in fifth place, eight games behind Brooklyn. The Reds then lost six of their next seven games to fall into sixth place, 12.5 games out. At the end of the season, Cincinnati was a sixth place team with an 83–67 record, 19 games behind Brooklyn.

=== Season standings ===
National League
Team	W	L	Pct.	GB	Home	Road
Brooklyn Superbas	101	47	.682	—	61‍–‍16	40‍–‍31
Boston Beaneaters	95	57	.625	8	53‍–‍26	42‍–‍31
Philadelphia Phillies	94	58	.618	9	58‍–‍25	36‍–‍33
Baltimore Orioles	86	62	.581	15	51‍–‍24	35‍–‍38
St. Louis Perfectos	84	67	.556	18½	50‍–‍33	34‍–‍34
Cincinnati Reds	83	67	.553	19	57‍–‍29	26‍–‍38
Pittsburgh Pirates	76	73	.510	25½	49‍–‍34	27‍–‍39
Chicago Orphans	75	73	.507	26	44‍–‍39	31‍–‍34
Louisville Colonels	75	77	.493	28	33‍–‍28	42‍–‍49
New York Giants	60	90	.400	42	35‍–‍38	25‍–‍52
Washington Senators	54	98	.355	49	35‍–‍43	19‍–‍55
Cleveland Spiders	20	134	.130	84	9‍–‍33	11‍–‍101

=== Record vs. opponents ===
1899 National League record Sources:
Team	BAL	BSN	BRO	CHI	CIN	CLE	LOU	NYG	PHI	PIT	STL	WAS
Baltimore	—	7–7	6–8	9–5	4–9	12–2	6–7–2	10–4	6–7–1	9–3	8–6	9–4–1
Boston	7–7	—	6–8	5–7	10–4	11–3	9–5	12–2	5–9	10–4	8–6	12–2–1
Brooklyn	8–6	8–6	—	8–5–1	7–6	14–0	11–3	10–4	8–6	8–6	8–4–1	11–3
Chicago	5–9	7–5	5–8–1	—	8–6	13–1	7–7	7–6–1	5–9	6–7–2	8–6	4–9
Cincinnati	9–4	4–10	6–7	6–8	—	14–0	8–6	9–5–1	4–10	10–3–3	5–8–2	8–6–1
Cleveland	2–12	3–11	0–14	1–13	0–14	—	4–10	1–13	2–12	2–12	1–13	4–10
Louisville	7–6–2	5–9	3–11	7–7	6–8	10–4	—	7–7	7–6	6–8–1	5–9–1	12–2
New York	4–10	2–12	2–10	6–7–1	5–9–1	13–1	7–7	—	4–10–1	6–7	4–10	7–7
Philadelphia	7–6–1	9–5	6–8	9–5	10–4	12–2	6–7	10–4–1	—	6–8	7–7	12–2
Pittsburgh	3–9	4–10	6–8	7–6–2	3–10–3	12–2	8–6–1	7–6	8–6	—	7–7	11–3
St. Louis	6–8	6–8	4–8–1	6–8	8–5–2	13–1	9–5–1	10–4	7–7	7–7	—	8–6
Washington	4–9–1	2–12–1	3–11	9–4	6–8–1	10–4	2–12	7–7	2–12	3–11	6–8	—

=== Roster ===
1899 Cincinnati Reds
Roster
Pitchers: Ted Breitenstein; Jack Cronin; Bill Dammann; Frank Dwyer; Emil Frisk; Noodles Hahn; Pink Hawley; Bill Phillips; Jack Taylor	Catchers: Mike Kahoe; Heinie Peitz; Bob Wood; Infielders: Jake Beckley; Tommy Corcoran; Kid Elberfeld; Charlie Irwin; Bid McPhee; Harry Steinfeldt; Farmer Vaughn	Outfielders: Jimmy Barrett; Sam Crawford; Lefty Houtz; Algie McBride; Dusty Miller; Kip Selbach; Socks Seybold; Mike Smith; Jake Stenzel	Manager: Buck Ewing

== Player stats ==
=== Batting ===
==== Starters by position ====
Note: Pos = Position; G = Games played; AB = At bats; H = Hits; Avg. = Batting average; HR = Home runs; RBI = Runs batted in

Pos	Player	G	AB	H	Avg.	HR	RBI
C	Heinie Peitz	94	293	79	.270	1	43
1B	Jake Beckley	135	517	172	.333	3	99
2B	Bid McPhee	112	377	105	.279	1	65
SS	Tommy Corcoran	138	540	150	.278	0	81
3B	Charlie Irwin	90	314	73	.232	1	52
OF	Kip Selbach	141	525	156	.297	3	87
OF	Dusty Miller	81	327	83	.254	0	37
OF	Mike Smith	88	343	101	.294	1	24

==== Other batters ====
Note: G = Games played; AB = At bats; H = Hits; Avg. = Batting average; HR = Home runs; RBI = Runs batted in

Player	G	AB	H	Avg.	HR	RBI
Harry Steinfeldt	108	390	96	.246	0	43
Algie McBride	64	251	87	.347	1	23
Bob Wood	63	195	61	.313	0	24
Kid Elberfeld	41	138	36	.261	0	22
Sam Crawford	31	127	39	.307	1	20
Farmer Vaughn	31	108	19	.176	0	2
Jimmy Barrett	26	92	34	.370	0	10
Socks Seybold	22	85	19	.224	0	8
Mike Kahoe	14	42	7	.167	0	4
Jake Stenzel	9	29	9	.310	0	3
Lefty Houtz	5	17	4	.235	0	0

=== Pitching ===
==== Starting pitchers ====
Note: G = Games pitched; IP = Innings pitched; W = Wins; L = Losses; ERA = Earned run average; SO = Strikeouts

Player	G	IP	W	L	ERA	SO
Noodles Hahn	38	309.0	23	8	2.68	145
Pink Hawley	34	250.1	14	17	4.24	46
Bill Phillips	33	227.2	17	9	3.32	43
Ted Breitenstein	26	210.2	13	9	3.59	59
Jack Taylor	25	180.1	9	10	4.09	35
Emil Frisk	9	68.1	3	6	3.95	17
Jack Cronin	5	41.0	2	2	5.49	9
Frank Dwyer	5	32.2	0	5	5.51	2

==== Other pitchers ====
Note: G = Games pitched; IP = Innings pitched; W = Wins; L = Losses; ERA = Earned run average; SO = Strikeouts

Player	G	IP	W	L	ERA	SO
Bill Dammann	9	48.0	2	1	4.88	2

==== Relief pitchers ====
Note: G = Games pitched; W = Wins; L = Losses; SV = Saves; ERA = Earned run average; SO = Strikeouts

Player	G	W	L	SV	ERA	SO
Heinie Peitz	1	0	0	0	5.40	3
