= Chummy Gray =

American baseball player (1873–1913)

- Pitcher
- Born: July 17, 1873; Rockland, Maine, U.S.
- Died: August 14, 1913 (aged 40); Rockland, Maine, U.S.
- Batted: Right Threw: Right

MLB debut
- September 14, 1899, for the Pittsburgh Pirates

Last MLB appearance
- October 14, 1899, for the Pittsburgh Pirates

MLB statistics
- Pitching record: 3-3
- Earned run average: 3.44
- Strikeouts: 9
- Stats at Baseball Reference

Teams
- Pittsburgh Pirates (1899)

George Edward Gray (July 17, 1873 – August 14, 1913) was an American pitcher who played briefly for the Pittsburgh Pirates during the 1899 season.
