= Charlie Kuhns =

American baseball player (1876–1922)

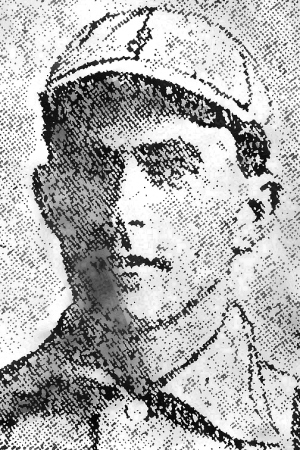
- Third baseman / Shortstop
- Born: October 27, 1876; Freeport, Pennsylvania, U.S.
- Died: July 15, 1922 (aged 45); Pittsburgh, Pennsylvania, U.S.
- Batted: Unknown Threw: Unknown

MLB debut
- June 4, 1897, for the Pittsburgh Pirates

Last MLB appearance
- October 14, 1899, for the Boston Beaneaters

MLB statistics
- Batting average: .238
- Home runs: 0
- Runs batted in: 3
- Stats at Baseball Reference

Teams
- Pittsburgh Pirates (1897); Boston Beaneaters (1899)

Charles Benton Kuhns (October 27, 1876 – July 15, 1922) was an American third baseman and shortstop in Major League Baseball. He played in one game for the Pittsburgh Pirates on June 4, 1897, and in seven games for the Boston Beaneaters in 1899. His minor league career stretched from 1897 through 1905.
