= Billy Ging =

American baseball player (1872–1950)

- Pitcher
- Born: November 7, 1872; Elmira, New York, U.S.
- Died: September 14, 1950 (aged 77); Elmira, New York, U.S.
- Batted: Right Threw: Right

MLB debut
- September 25, 1899, for the Boston Beaneaters

Last MLB appearance
- September 25, 1899, for the Boston Beaneaters

MLB statistics
- Win–loss record: 1–0
- Earned run average: 1.13
- Strikeouts: 2
- Stats at Baseball Reference

Teams
- Boston Beaneaters (1899)

William Joseph Ging (November 7, 1872 – September 14, 1950) was an American pitcher in Major League Baseball.

Ging was born in Elmira, New York. He started his professional baseball career in 1898. In 1899, he had a win-loss record of 16-17 for the Connecticut League's New London Whalers. He appeared in his only major league game on September 25, when he started and completed the Boston Beaneaters' final game of the season, a 2-1 win over the New York Giants.

Ging then played in the minor leagues from 1900 to 1904. After his baseball career, he worked for years for the Pennsylvania Railroad and American-LaFrance-Foamite. He died in his hometown of Elmira in 1950.
