= Lefty Herring =

American baseball player (1880–1965)

- First baseman
- Born: March 4, 1880; Philadelphia, Pennsylvania, U.S.
- Died: February 11, 1965 (aged 84); Massapequa, New York, U.S.
- Batted: Left Threw: Left

MLB debut
- May 16, 1899, for the Washington Senators

Last MLB appearance
- September 3, 1904, for the Washington Senators

MLB statistics
- Batting average: .191
- Home runs: 0
- Runs batted in: 4
- Stats at Baseball Reference

Teams
- Washington Senators (NL) (1899); Washington Senators (AL) (1904)

Silas Clarke "Lefty" Herring (March 4, 1880 – February 11, 1965) was an American first baseman in Major League Baseball. He played for the National League's Washington Senators and American League's Washington Senators. He stood at 5 ft 11 in (1.80 m) and weighed 160 lbs.

== Biography ==
Herring was born in Philadelphia, Pennsylvania, one of nine children born to Fred and Elizabeth Herring. He worked as a government clerk towards the end of the 19th century and also played amateur baseball on the side, mostly as a pitcher.

In 1899, Herring was discovered by the Senators. He made his major league debut on May 16, pitching one inning without allowing any runs and getting a hit in his only at bat. The Washington Post reported that Herring was "a hit with the crowd. He possesses speed and control, and with the benefit of coaching should be developed into a clever left-handed pitcher." On June 1, Herring made his second MLB appearance, again pitching one scoreless inning. He also drew a walk and scored on a teammate's double.

For the next few years, Herring returned to amateur baseball and eventually stopped pitching and converted to first base and the outfield. In 1904, he was batting .429 in the Sunday School League when he was signed by the American League's Senators. Herring struggled in 15 major league games that year. He batted just .174 and was inconsistent in the field. According to the Post, Herring was "good on handling thrown balls, but forgets what to do when grounders are hit his way." He played his last game for the Senators on September 3.

Herring played with various amateur, semi-pro, and minor league teams after 1904, including one stint in the Virginia League. He was married with three children, and the marriage ended in divorce in the 1920s.

During his later years, Herring worked as a mail supervisor for an automotive company. He died in 1965 in Massapequa, New York.
