= Frank Bonner (baseball) =

American baseball player (1869–1905)

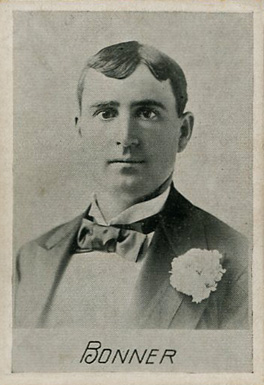
- Second baseman
- Born: August 20, 1869; Lowell, Massachusetts, US
- Died: December 31, 1905 (aged 36); Kansas City, Missouri, US
- Batted: Right Threw: Right

MLB debut
- April 26, 1894, for the Baltimore Orioles

Last MLB appearance
- June 25, 1903, for the Boston Beaneaters

MLB statistics
- Batting average: .257
- Home runs: 4
- Runs batted in: 115
- Stats at Baseball Reference

Teams
- Baltimore Orioles (1894–1895); St. Louis Browns (1895); Brooklyn Bridegrooms (1896); Washington Senators (1899); Cleveland Bronchos (1902); Philadelphia Athletics (1902); Boston Beaneaters (1903)

Frank J. Bonner (August 20, 1869 – December 31, 1905) was an American professional baseball utility player. He played in Major League Baseball (MLB) from 1894 to 1903 for the Baltimore Orioles, St. Louis Browns, Brooklyn Bridegrooms, Washington Senators, Cleveland Bronchos, Philadelphia Athletics, and Boston Beaneaters. He was born in Lowell, Massachusetts. Bonner was nicknamed "the Human Flea".

Bonner died of blood poisoning at the age of 36. His wife had committed suicide in June of that year.
