= Dorsey Riddlemoser =

American baseball player (1875–1954)

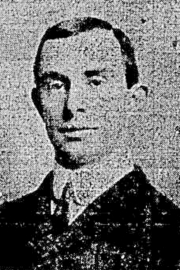
- Pitcher
- Born: March 25, 1875; Frederick, Maryland, U.S.
- Died: May 11, 1954 (aged 79); Frederick, Maryland, U.S.
- Batted: Right Threw: Right

MLB debut
- August 22, 1899, for the Washington Senators

Last MLB appearance
- August 22, 1899, for the Washington Senators

MLB statistics
- Pitching record: 0-0
- Strikeouts: 0
- Earned run average: 18.00
- Stats at Baseball Reference

Teams
- Washington Senators 1899

Dorsey Lee Riddlemoser (March 25, 1875 – May 11, 1954) was an American professional baseball player who played in one game for the Washington Senators during the 1899 season.

He was born in Frederick, Maryland and died there at the age of 78.
