= Bill Leith =

American baseball player (1873–1940)

- Pitcher
- Born: May 31, 1873; Matteawan, New York, U.S.
- Died: July 16, 1940 (aged 67); Beacon, New York, U.S.
- Batted: Unknown Threw: Right

MLB debut
- September 25, 1899, for the Washington Senators

Last MLB appearance
- September 25, 1899, for the Washington Senators

MLB statistics
- Pitching record: 0–0
- Strikeouts: 1
- Earned run average: 18.00
- Stats at Baseball Reference

Teams
- Washington Senators (1899)

William Leith (May 31, 1873 – July 16, 1940), nicknamed "Shady Bill", was an American professional baseball player who played in one game for the Washington Senators during the 1899 season.
