= Wally Kopf =

American baseball player

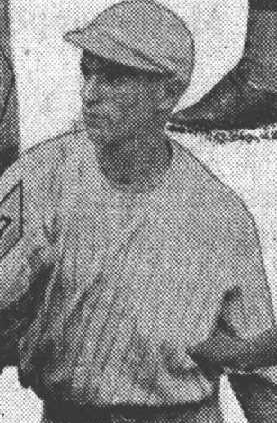
- Third baseman / Second baseman
- Born: July 10, 1899; Stonington, Connecticut, U.S.
- Died: April 30, 1979 (aged 79); Cincinnati, Ohio, U.S.
- Batted: Switch Threw: Right

MLB debut
- October 1, 1921, for the New York Giants

Last MLB appearance
- October 2, 1921, for the New York Giants

MLB statistics
- Batting average: .333
- Hits: 1
- Bases on balls: 1
- Stats at Baseball Reference

Teams
- New York Giants (1921)

Walter Henry Kopf (July 10, 1899 – April 30, 1979) was a German American professional baseball player whose career spanned two seasons, which included one in Major League Baseball (MLB) with the New York Giants (1921). He played only two games, making his debut on October 1, 1921, and his final appearance the next day. In those games, he played third base, compiling one hit in three at bats. In 1922, he played in the minor leagues with the Oakland Oaks, Reading Aces, and the Newark Bears. Before pro-baseball, Kopf attended Dartmouth College (1919–21). He served in World War I. After his baseball career was over, he moved to Cincinnati where he worked as a building contractor. He was the younger brother of professional baseball player Larry Kopf.

== Early life ==
Kopf was born on July 10, 1899, in Stonington, Connecticut, to Lannie and Malone Kopf, who were both from Germany. He was one of 4 boys in the house. His brother Larry, was a baseball player that spent most of his time with the Cincinnati Reds and later inducted into the Cincinnati Reds hall of fame. Wally Kopf had seven siblings; brothers Larry, Otto, Herb, who went on to be a football coach and player and Frances; and sister Helen. His brother Larry was a professional baseball player who played in Major League Baseball (MLB) with the Cleveland Naps, Philadelphia Athletics, Cincinnati Reds, and Boston Braves for 10 seasons (1913–23). For three years from 1919 to 1921, Wally Kopf attended Dartmouth College. In 1918, after announcing he was enrolling in Dartmouth, The Washington Post wrote that "Walter Kopf brother of the famous Benny [...] is said to be better than his big league brother". While college, he played basketball and baseball. In the latter sport, he played shortstop. He served in the United States Armed Forces during World War I.

== Baseball career ==
Kopf played semi-professional baseball with the Stamford, Connecticut, team in 1921. On September 12, 1921, he signed with the New York Giants. He played two games that season, batting .333 with one hit, one base on balls, and one strikeout in three at bats. Defensively, he played third base, turing one double play in six total chances. Although he didn't play, Kopf was a member of the Giants roster during the 1921 World Series. He received part of the cash reward after the Giants won the World Series.

At the start of the 1922 season, Kopf was a member of the Giants second team, which was compiled of players who were cut from New York's spring training roster and assigned to a team that played minor league teams in Texas. After his trial with the Giants second team, he was assigned to the Double-A Newark Bears of the International League. After a week with the Bears, Kopf was turned back to the Giants and manager John McGraw gave him an unconditional release. Later that year, he signed with the Brooklyn Dodgers. The Dodgers assigned Kopf to the Double-A Oakland Oaks of the Pacific Coast League. With the Oaks, he batted .246 with 16 hits, and five doubles in 20 games played. Brooklyn then assigned him to Newark Bears. Finally, the Dodgers sold Kopf to the Double-A Reading Aces of the International League. His combined totals in the International League that season was a batting average of .228 with 18 hits, three doubles, and two home runs in 23 games played.

Kopf played for a semi-professional team in Upstate New York after the 1922 season. He also played with a resort team in Vermont. The Vancouver Sun described Kopf as having a "football throwing arm". In 1924, Kopf played for a semi-pro team named Simmons. In the mid-1920s, Kopf was a player-manager for the Ludlow, Kentucky, semi-pro baseball team. Kopf signed with the Class-A Little Rock Travelers of the Southern Association. With the Travelers, he batted .243 with 27 hits, four doubles, and three triples in 30 games played.

== Basketball career ==
Kopf and his brother Larry played semi-professional basketball for the Coral Gables, Florida, team in 1925. Walt Kopf was the head coach of that team, which practiced at the YMCA in the area. The two also played basketball in Cincinnati. Wally Kopf played the center position.

== Later life ==
By 1930, Kopf lived in Cincinnati, Ohio with his wife, Virginia. He was working as a building contractor in Ohio after his playing career. On August 10, 1935, Kopf, who was the building contractor on a project in Cincinnati found a Muscogee people burial ground. In 1965, he and his brother, Larry, attended an event put on by the Cincinnati Reds called "Former Major Leaguers Day". He died on April 30, 1979, in Cincinnati, Ohio. He was buried at the Calvary Cemetery in Cincinnati.
