= Dick Butler (baseball) =

American baseball player (1869–1917)

- Catcher
- Born: December 1869; Brooklyn, New York, U.S.
- Died: July 16, 1917 (aged 47); New York, New York, U.S.
- Batted: Unknown Threw: Unknown

MLB debut
- June 16, 1897, for the Louisville Colonels

Last MLB appearance
- June 28, 1899, for the Washington Senators

MLB statistics
- Games played: 22
- At bats: 74
- Hits: 17
- Stats at Baseball Reference

Teams
- Louisville Colonels (1897); Washington Senators (1899)

Richard H. Butler (December 1869 – July 16, 1917) was an American Major League Baseball catcher. He played for the 1897 Louisville Colonels and 1899 Washington Senators.

== Sources ==
- Career statistics from Baseball Reference · Baseball Reference (Minors) · Retrosheet
