= Pete McBride =

American baseball player (1875–1944)

- Pitcher
- Born: July 9, 1875; Adams, Massachusetts, U.S.
- Died: July 3, 1944 (aged 68); North Adams, Massachusetts, U.S.
- Batted: Right Threw: Right

MLB debut
- September 20, 1898, for the Cleveland Spiders

Last MLB appearance
- September 14, 1899, for the St. Louis Perfectos

MLB statistics
- Win–loss record: 2-5
- Strikeouts: 32
- Earned run average: 4.31
- Stats at Baseball Reference

Teams
- Cleveland Spiders (1898); St. Louis Perfectos (1899)

Peter William McBride (July 9, 1875 – July 3, 1944) was an American pitcher in Major League Baseball. He pitched in one game for the Cleveland Spiders in 1898 and then was transferred to the St. Louis Perfectos before the 1899 season along with most of the Spiders' better players. He pitched in 11 games for the Perfectos, ending his major league career.
