= Lafayette Henion =

American baseball player (1899-1955)

- Pitcher
- Born: June 7, 1899; Eureka, California, U.S.
- Died: July 22, 1955 (aged 56); San Luis Obispo, California, U.S.
- Batted: Right Threw: Right

MLB debut
- September 10, 1919, for the Brooklyn Robins

Last MLB appearance
- September 10, 1919, for the Brooklyn Robins

MLB statistics
- Win–loss record: 0–0
- Earned run average: 6.00
- Strikeouts: 2
- Stats at Baseball Reference

Teams
- Brooklyn Robins (1919)

Lafayette Marion Henion (June 7, 1899 – July 22, 1955) was an American pitcher in Major League Baseball. He pitched in one game for the Brooklyn Robins on September 10, 1919, working three innings and giving up two hits and two runs. He also struck out two and walked two.
