= Dusty Miller (1890s outfielder) =

American baseball player (1868–1945)

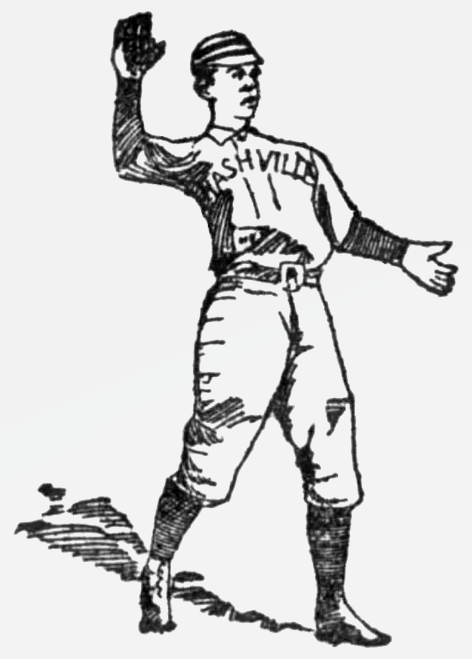
- An 1893 illustration of Miller
- Outfielder
- Born: September 10, 1868; Oil City, Pennsylvania, U.S.
- Died: September 3, 1945 (aged 76); Memphis, Tennessee, U.S.
- Batted: Left Threw: Right

MLB debut
- September 23, 1889, for the Baltimore Orioles

Last MLB appearance
- August 20, 1899, for the St. Louis Perfectos

MLB statistics
- Batting average: .301
- Home runs: 22
- Runs batted in: 421
- Stats at Baseball Reference

Teams
- Baltimore Orioles (1889); St. Louis Browns (1890); Cincinnati Reds (1895–99); St. Louis Perfectos (1899)

Charles Bradley Miller (September 10, 1868 – September 3, 1945) was an American Major League Baseball outfielder. He played all or part of seven seasons in the majors, between 1889 and 1899, for the St. Louis Browns/Perfectos, Cincinnati Reds, and Baltimore Orioles.

In 656 games over seven seasons, Miller posted a .301 batting average (771-for-2561) with 445 runs, 22 home runs, 421 RBI, 206 stolen bases, 174 bases on balls and .421 slugging percentage.

Miller died in Memphis, Tennessee in 1945 of coronary thrombosis.

== See also ==
- List of Major League Baseball career stolen bases leaders
