= Eli Rosebraugh =

American baseball player (1875–1930)

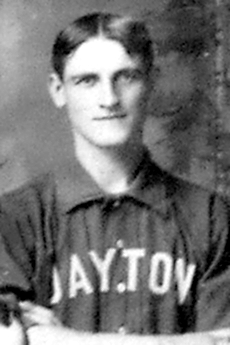
- Pitcher
- Born: September 8, 1875; Charleston, Illinois, U.S.
- Died: July 16, 1930 (aged 54); Fresno, California, U.S.
- Batted: Unknown Threw: Left

MLB debut
- September 21, 1898, for the Pittsburgh Pirates

Last MLB appearance
- July 5, 1899, for the Pittsburgh Pirates

MLB statistics
- Pitching Record: 0-3
- Earned run average: 4.55
- Strikeouts: 8
- Stats at Baseball Reference

Teams
- Pittsburgh Pirates (1898–1899)

Eli Ethelbert Rosebraugh (typically spelled Rosebrough during his career) (September 8, 1875 – July 16, 1930) was an American professional baseball player. According to a Sporting Life article from June 18, 1898, he threw a no-hitter with the Dayton Old Soldiers. The Pirates bought Rosebraugh for $700 on July 31,1898. He coached at Oberlin College for part of 1899.

On July 16, 1930, Rosebraugh committed suicide by shooting himself. He was buried in Washington Colony Cemetery, Fresno, California.
