= George Decker (baseball) =

American baseball player (1866–1909)

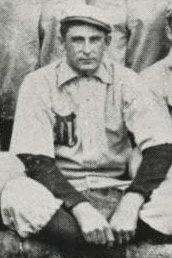
- Outfielder / First baseman
- Born: June 1, 1866; York, Pennsylvania, U.S.
- Died: June 7, 1909 (aged 43); Patton, California, U.S.
- Batted: Left Threw: Left

MLB debut
- July 11, 1892, for the Chicago Colts

Last MLB appearance
- July 12, 1899, for the Washington Senators

MLB statistics
- Batting average: .276
- Home runs: 25
- Runs batted in: 416
- Stats at Baseball Reference

Teams
- Chicago Colts (1892–1897); St. Louis Browns (1898); Louisville Colonels (1898–1899); Washington Senators (1899)

George A. Decker (June 1, 1866 – June 7, 1909) was an American professional baseball player who played outfield in the Major Leagues from 1892-1899. Decker played for the St. Louis Browns, Chicago Colts, Louisville Colonels, and Washington Senators.

In 704 games over eight seasons, Decker posted a .276 batting average (756-for-2739) with 423 runs, 25 home runs, 416 RBI and 112 stolen bases. He finished his career with a .959 fielding percentage playing at every position except pitcher and catcher.
