= Aleck Smith =

American baseball player (1871–1919)

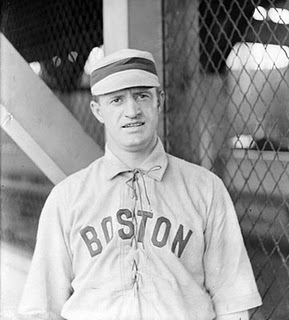
- Smith in 1903
- Catcher
- Born: 1871; New York City, New York, U.S.
- Died: July 9, 1919; New York City, New York, U.S.
- Batted: Unknown Threw: Right

MLB debut
- April 23, 1897, for the Brooklyn Bridegrooms

Last MLB appearance
- October 5, 1906, for the New York Giants

MLB statistics
- Batting average: .264
- Home runs: 1
- Runs batted in: 130
- Stats at Baseball Reference

Teams
- Brooklyn Bridegrooms / Superbas (1897–1899); Baltimore Orioles (1899); Brooklyn Superbas (1900); New York Giants (1901); Baltimore Orioles (1902); Boston Americans (1903); Chicago Cubs (1904); New York Giants (1906)

Alexander Benjamin "Aleck" Smith (1871 – July 9, 1919) was an American Major League Baseball catcher from New York City. Nicknamed Broadway Aleck, he played nine seasons in the majors, between 1897 and 1906, for six different teams.

He had a nine-year career in the major leagues, and played a total of 287 games with a .264 average, 1 HR, and 130 RBI. Although he spent most of his career behind the plate, Smith also played 57 games in the outfield, 18 at first base, 10 at third base and 5 at second.

He is interred at Woodlawn Cemetery in the Bronx, New York City.
