= 1899 Major League Baseball season =

1899 MLB season
- League: National League (NL)
- Sport: Baseball
- Duration: April 14 – October 15, 1899
- Games: 154
- Teams: 12

Pennant winner
- NL champions: Brooklyn Superbas
- NL runners-up: Boston Beaneaters

MLB seasons
- ← 1898 1900 →

Locations of teams for the 1899 National League season
National League

The 1899 major league baseball season was contested from April 14 through October 15, 1899, and saw the Brooklyn Superbas as the pennant winner of the National League. There was no postseason.

The 1899 was the final season of a stable 12-team, eight-season run which saw no expansion or contraction of teams. Following the end of the season, the National League contracted from 12 to 8 teams, eliminating the Baltimore Orioles, Cleveland Spiders, Louisville Colonels, and Washington Senators. The elimination of major-league baseball from these cities prompted the minor league Western League to position themselves as a major league in 1901, by beginning a transition from a Midwest-focused league to the nationwide focused American League.

The 1899 season is famous for the Cleveland Spiders finishing with the worst single-season record of all time (minimum 120 games), finishing at a dismal 20–134 (.130), largely due to the fact that the Spiders-owning Robison family bought the St. Louis Perfectos prior to the 1899 season, then proceeded to move all Cleveland talent to St. Louis, leaving the Spiders a talent-depleted team. The only other major-league team of the 19th century with a worse record was the 1884 Wilmington Quicksteps, who entered the unstable single-season Union Association as a late-season replacement for the Philadelphia Keystones and played only 18 games, with a record of 2–16 (.111).

The Brooklyn Bridegrooms and St. Louis Browns renamed as the Brooklyn Superbas and St. Louis Perfectos, respectively.

== Schedule ==
The 1899 schedule consisted of 154 games for the twelve teams of the National League. Each team was scheduled to play 14 games against the other eleven teams in the league. This format had previously been used by the National League in 1892 and the previous season. This would be the final season which saw this format, due to the reduction of teams the following season.

Opening Day took place on April 14 featuring four teams. The final day of the season on October 15, featuring five teams play in four games (Chicago hosted Louisville and St. Louis hosted Chicago, while Cincinnati hosted Cleveland in a doubleheader).

== Rule changes ==
The 1899 season saw the following rule changes:

- Home plate is required to be a 12 in × 12 in (30 cm × 30 cm) square, positioned such that opposite corners point towards the pitcher and catcher.
- As a result of catcher's interference, a batter is now awarded first base.
- Catchers must remain within the catcher's box until a pitch was released from the pitcher's hand (Rule 17).
- A player in a uniform different from his teammates will not be allowed on the field (Rule 19).
- A foul tip caught by a catcher in the catcher's box is a strike (Rule 43).
- Restrictions on coaches in the coaching boxes were implemented, forbidding them from bench jockeying, arguing umpire calls, and interacting with spectators (Rule 52).
- The number of players that each team could place its reserved list to was reduced to 18.

== Teams ==
League	Team	City	Ballpark	Capacity	Manager
National League	Baltimore Orioles	Baltimore, Maryland	Union Park	11,000	John McGraw
National League	Boston Beaneaters	Boston, Massachusetts	South End Grounds	6,600	Frank Selee
National League	Brooklyn Superbas	New York, New York	Washington Park	12,000	Ned Hanlon
National League	Chicago Orphans	Chicago, Illinois	West Side Park	13,000	Tom Burns
National League	Cincinnati Reds	Cincinnati, Ohio	League Park (Cincinnati)	9,000	Buck Ewing
National League	Cleveland Spiders	Cleveland, Ohio	League Park (Cleveland)	9,000	Lave Cross
National League	Cleveland Spiders	Cleveland, Ohio	League Park (Cleveland)	9,000	Joe Quinn
National League	Louisville Colonels	Louisville, Kentucky	Eclipse Park	6,400	Fred Clarke
National League	New York Giants	New York, New York	Polo Grounds	16,000	John Day
National League	New York Giants	New York, New York	Polo Grounds	16,000	Fred Hoey
National League	Philadelphia Phillies	Philadelphia, Pennsylvania	National League Park	18,000	Bill Shettsline
National League	Pittsburgh Pirates	Allegheny, Pennsylvania	Exposition Park	6,500	Bill Watkins
National League	Pittsburgh Pirates	Allegheny, Pennsylvania	Exposition Park	6,500	Patsy Donovan
National League	St. Louis Perfectos	St. Louis, Missouri	League Park (St. Louis)	14,500	Patsy Tebeau
National League	Washington Senators	Washington, D.C.	Boundary Field	6,500	Arthur Irwin

1. In today's Pittsburgh, Pennsylvania.

=== Sunday games ===
Blue laws restricted Sunday activities in several localities, causing several teams to play at ballparks in a different locality.

Team	City	Ballpark	Capacity	Games played
Cleveland Spiders	St. Louis, Missouri	League Park (St. Louis)	14,500	1
New York Giants	West New York, New Jersey	West New York Field Club Grounds	Unknown	4

== Standings ==
=== National League ===
National League
Team	W	L	Pct.	GB	Home	Road
Brooklyn Superbas	101	47	.682	—	61‍–‍16	40‍–‍31
Boston Beaneaters	95	57	.625	8	53‍–‍26	42‍–‍31
Philadelphia Phillies	94	58	.618	9	58‍–‍25	36‍–‍33
Baltimore Orioles	86	62	.581	15	51‍–‍24	35‍–‍38
St. Louis Perfectos	84	67	.556	18½	50‍–‍33	34‍–‍34
Cincinnati Reds	83	67	.553	19	57‍–‍29	26‍–‍38
Pittsburgh Pirates	76	73	.510	25½	49‍–‍34	27‍–‍39
Chicago Orphans	75	73	.507	26	44‍–‍39	31‍–‍34
Louisville Colonels	75	77	.493	28	33‍–‍28	42‍–‍49
New York Giants	60	90	.400	42	35‍–‍38	25‍–‍52
Washington Senators	54	98	.355	49	35‍–‍43	19‍–‍55
Cleveland Spiders	20	134	.130	84	9‍–‍33	11‍–‍101

=== Tie games ===
20 tie games, which are not factored into winning percentage or games behind (and were often replayed again), occurred throughout the season.

- Baltimore Orioles, 4
- Boston Beaneaters, 1
- Brooklyn Superbas, 2
- Chicago Orphans, 4
- Cincinnati Reds, 7
- Louisville Colonels, 4
- New York Giants, 3
- Pittsburgh Pirates, 6
- St. Louis Perfectos, 4
- Washington Senators, 3

== Managerial changes ==
=== Off-season ===
Team	Former Manager	New Manager
Baltimore Orioles	Ned Hanlon	John McGraw
Brooklyn Superbas	Charles Ebbets	Ned Hanlon
Cleveland Spiders	Patsy Tebeau	Lave Cross
New York Giants	Cap Anson	John Day
St. Louis Perfectos	Tim Hurst	Patsy Tebeau

=== In-season ===
Team	Former Manager	New Manager
Cleveland Spiders	Lave Cross	Joe Quinn
New York Giants	John Day	Fred Hoey
Pittsburgh Pirates	Bill Watkins	Patsy Donovan

== League leaders ==
=== National League ===
Hitting leaders
Stat	Player	Total
AVG	Ed Delahanty (PHI)	.410
OPS	Ed Delahanty (PHI)	1.046
HR	Buck Freeman (WAS)	25
RBI	Ed Delahanty (PHI)	137
R	Willie Keeler (BRO); John McGraw (BAL)	140
H	Ed Delahanty (PHI)	238
SB	Jimmy Sheckard (BAL)	77

Pitching leaders
Stat	Player	Total
W	Jay Hughes (BRO); Joe McGinnity (BAL)	28
L	Jim Hughey (CLE)	30
ERA	Vic Willis (BSN)	2.50
K	Noodles Hahn (CIN)	145
IP	Sam Leever (PIT)	379.0
SV	Sam Leever (PIT)	3
WHIP	Cy Young (STL)	1.116

== Milestones ==
=== Pitchers ===
==== No-hitters ====
- Deacon Phillippe (LOU):
  - Phillippe threw his first career no-hitter and the fourth no-hitter in franchise history, by defeating the New York Giants 7–0 on May 25. Phillippe walked three struck out one.
- Vic Willis (BSN):
  - Willis threw his first career no-hitter and the second no-hitter in franchise history, by defeating the Washington Senators 7–1 on August 7. Willis walked three, hit two by pitch, and struck out five.

== Home field attendance ==
Team name	Wins	%±	Home attendance	%±	Per game
Philadelphia Phillies	94	20.5%	388,933	46.5%	4,686
St. Louis Perfectos	84	115.4%	373,909	146.5%	4,298
Chicago Orphans	75	−11.8%	352,130	−17.0%	4,143
Brooklyn Superbas	101	87.0%	269,641	120.1%	3,457
Cincinnati Reds	83	−9.8%	259,536	−22.8%	2,949
Pittsburgh Pirates	76	5.6%	251,834	66.9%	2,963
Boston Beaneaters	95	−6.9%	200,384	−12.6%	2,505
Baltimore Orioles	86	−1.2%	121,935	−2.5%	1,584
New York Giants	60	−22.1%	121,384	−54.3%	1,597
Louisville Colonels	75	−15.2%	109,319	6.2%	1,735
Washington Senators	54	−16.3%	86,392	−15.3%	1,094
Cleveland Spiders	20	−91.4%	6,088	−88.3%	145

== Venues ==
The home of the St. Louis Perfectos, New Sportsman's Park, is renamed League Park.

The home of the Louisville Colonels, Eclipse Park, was destroyed in a fire on August 12, while the team was on a road trip. Following their return home, they would have a 12-game homestand from August 22 through September 2 in a partially rebuilt park, before spending the rest of the season on the road.

Regarding games that were rescheduled to Sunday, and existing blue laws:

- The Cleveland Spiders host the Louisville Colonels at the home of the St. Louis Perfectos at League Park on Sunday September 24, as part of Louisville's game 2 of their split doubleheader (both against St. Louis and Cleveland). Both Cleveland and St. Louis were owned by Frank and Stanley Robison.
- The New York Giants played four home games at the West New York Field Club Grounds in West New York, New Jersey on June 4, July 16, August 13, September 17.

== See also ==
- 1899 in baseball (Events, Births, Deaths)
