= Harry Croft =

American baseball player (1875–1933)

- Outfielder / Second baseman
- Born: August 1, 1875; Chicago, Illinois, U.S.
- Died: December 1, 1933 (aged 58); Oak Park, Illinois, U.S.
- Batted: Unknown Threw: Unknown

MLB debut
- May 19, 1899, for the Louisville Colonels

Last MLB appearance
- September 24, 1901, for the Chicago Orphans

MLB statistics
- Games: 7
- At Bats: 21
- Hits: 5
- Batting average: .238
- Stats at Baseball Reference

Teams
- Louisville Colonels (1899); Philadelphia Phillies (1899); Chicago Orphans (1901)

Henry T. Croft (August 1, 1875 – December 11, 1933) was an American professional baseball player from 1899 to 1901, playing for three Major League teams: the Chicago Orphans, Philadelphia Phillies, and the Louisville Colonels.

== Biography ==
Croft was born in Chicago, Illinois, on August 1, 1875. He attended Niagara University and played baseball for the university. He was drafted by the Louisville Colonels in the 1898 rule 5 draft.

Croft had his professional baseball debut at age 23 on May 19, 1899, with the Louisville Colonels. He played two games as an outfielder with the Colonels before being released in July 1899. He was signed by the Philadelphia Phillies on July 26, 1899, as a free agent, and played second base in 2 games for the Phillies in the 1899 season. He played for the Chicago Orphans in his second and last season (1901), playing in three (3) games in the outfield during the season, with his final game on September 24, 1901.

Croft died on December 11, 1933, in Oak Park, Illinois. He is buried in Mount Carmel Cemetery in Hillside, Illinois.

== Bibliography ==
- "Harry Croft Statistics". Baseball-References.com.
- "Harry Croft Baseball Stats". Baseball Almanac.
