= Dave Wills (baseball) =

American baseball player (1877–1959)

- First baseman
- Born: January 26, 1877; Charlottesville, Virginia
- Died: October 13, 1959 (aged 82); Washington, D.C.
- Batted: Left Threw: Left

MLB debut
- June 8, 1899, for the Louisville Colonels

Last MLB appearance
- August 31, 1899, for the Louisville Colonels

MLB statistics
- Batting average: .223
- Home runs: 0
- Runs batted in: 12
- Stats at Baseball Reference

Teams
- Louisville Colonels (1899)

Davis Bowels Wills (January 26, 1877 – October 13, 1959) was a Major League Baseball first baseman for the 1899 Louisville Colonels. He went to college at the University of Virginia.
