= Geechie Meredith =

American baseball player (1899–1932)

- Infielder
- Born: October 22, 1899; Jefferson County, Alabama, U.S.
- Died: January 13, 1932 (aged 32); Jefferson County, Alabama, U.S.
- Batted: Right Threw: Right

Negro league baseball debut
- 1920, for the Birmingham Black Barons

Last appearance
- 1931, for the Birmingham Black Barons

Teams
- Birmingham Black Barons (1920, 1923–1925, 1927–1929, 1931); Memphis Red Sox (1927); Nashville Elite Giants (1930)

Buford "Geechie" Meredith (October 22, 1899 – January 13, 1932) was an American professional baseball infielder in the Negro leagues. He played from 1920 to 1931, playing mostly with the Birmingham Black Barons. He also played with the Memphis Red Sox and the Nashville Elite Giants. Meredith died in an off-season mining accident.
