= Jack Fifield =

American baseball player (1871–1939)

- Pitcher
- Born: October 5, 1871; Enfield, New Hampshire, U.S.
- Died: November 27, 1939 (aged 68); Syracuse, New York, U.S.
- Batted: Right Threw: Right

MLB debut
- April 28, 1897, for the Philadelphia Phillies

Last MLB appearance
- October 12, 1899, for the Washington Senators

MLB statistics
- Win–loss record: 21–39
- Earned run average: 4.59
- Strikeouts: 89
- Stats at Baseball Reference

Teams
- Philadelphia Phillies (1897–1899); Washington Senators (1899)

John Proctor Fifield (October 5, 1871 – November 27, 1939) was an American Major League Baseball pitcher.
