= Bob Langsford =

American baseball player (1865–1907)

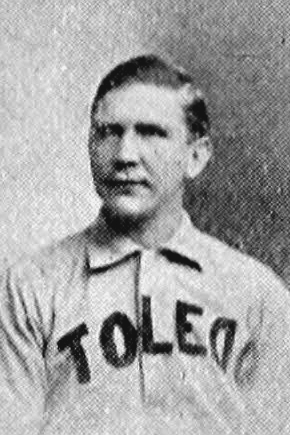
- Shortstop
- Born: August 5, 1865; Louisville, Kentucky, U.S.
- Died: January 10, 1907 (aged 41); Louisville, Kentucky, U.S.
- Batted: Left Threw: Left

MLB debut
- June 18, 1899, for the Louisville Colonels

Last MLB appearance
- June 18, 1899, for the Louisville Colonels

MLB statistics
- Batting average: .000
- Home runs: 0
- Runs batted in: 0
- Stats at Baseball Reference

Teams
- Louisville Colonels (1899)

Robert William Langsford (born Robert Hugo Lankswert; August 5, 1865 – January 10, 1907), was an American Major League Baseball shortstop for the 1899 Louisville Colonels.
