= Jim Gardner (baseball) =

American baseball player (1874–1905)

- Pitcher
- Born: October 4, 1874; Pittsburgh, Pennsylvania, U.S.
- Died: April 24, 1905 (aged 30); Pittsburgh, Pennsylvania, U.S.
- Batted: Unknown Threw: Right

MLB debut
- June 20, 1895, for the Pittsburgh Pirates

Last MLB appearance
- May 23, 1902, for the Chicago Orphans

MLB statistics
- Win–loss record: 25–22
- Earned run average: 3.85
- Strikeouts: 115
- Stats at Baseball Reference

Teams
- Pittsburgh Pirates (1895, 1897–1899); Chicago Orphans (1902)

James Anderson Gardner (October 4, 1874 – April 24, 1905) was an American professional baseball player. He was a pitcher for the Pittsburgh Pirates and Chicago Orphans of the National League between 1895 and 1902.
