= Burley Bayer =

American baseball player (1875–1933)

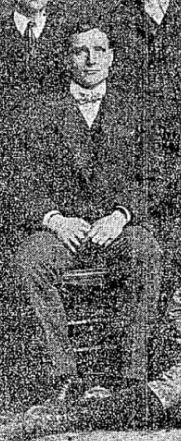
- Shortstop
- Born: December 19, 1875; Louisville, Kentucky
- Died: May 30, 1933 (aged 57); Louisville, Kentucky
- Batted: Unknown Threw: Unknown

MLB debut
- June 17, 1899, for the Louisville Colonels

Last MLB appearance
- June 17, 1899, for the Louisville Colonels

MLB statistics
- Batting average: .000
- Home runs: 0
- Runs batted in: 0
- Stats at Baseball Reference

Teams
- Louisville Colonels (1899)

Christopher Andy "Burley" Bayer (December 19, 1875 – May 30, 1933) was an American Major League Baseball shortstop for the 1899 Louisville Colonels.
