= Mike Heydon =

American baseball player (1874–1913)

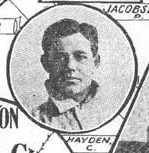
- Catcher
- Born: July 15, 1874; Missouri
- Died: October 13, 1913 (aged 39); Indianapolis, Indiana
- Batted: Left Threw: Right

MLB debut
- October 12, 1898, for the Baltimore Orioles

Last MLB appearance
- August 16, 1907, for the Washington Senators

MLB statistics
- At bats: 619
- RBI: 53
- Home runs: 2
- Batting average: .179
- Stats at Baseball Reference

Teams
- Baltimore Orioles (1898); Washington Senators (1899); St. Louis Cardinals (1901); Chicago White Sox (1904); Washington Senators (1905–1907)

Michael Edward Heydon (July 15, 1874 – October 13, 1913) was a professional baseball player who played catcher in the Major Leagues in 1898-1907. He played for the Chicago White Sox, Washington Senators (NL), Washington Senators (AL), Baltimore Orioles, and St. Louis Cardinals.
