= Tim Flood (baseball) =

American baseball player (1877–1929)

- Second baseman
- Born: March 13, 1877; Montgomery City, Missouri, U.S.
- Died: June 15, 1929 (aged 52); St. Louis, Missouri, U.S.
- Batted: Right Threw: Right

MLB debut
- September 24, 1899, for the St. Louis Perfectos

Last MLB appearance
- September 24, 1903, for the Brooklyn Superbas

MLB statistics
- Batting average: .233
- Home runs: 3
- Runs batted in: 86
- Stats at Baseball Reference

Teams
- St. Louis Perfectos (1899); Brooklyn Superbas (1902–1903)

Thomas Timothy Flood (March 13, 1877 – June 15, 1929) was an American professional baseball player who played second base for the St. Louis Perfectos in 1899 and the Brooklyn Superbas from 1902 to 1903.

While playing minor league baseball in Canada in 1907, Flood was arrested for assaulting an umpire during a game and served one week in jail. He was subsequently suspended from the league.
