= Pete Cassidy (baseball) =

American baseball player (1873–1929)

- First baseman
- Born: April 8, 1873; Wilmington, Delaware, U.S.
- Died: July 9, 1929 (aged 56); Wilmington, Delaware, U.S.
- Batted: Right Threw: Right

MLB debut
- April 18, 1896, for the Louisville Colonels

Last MLB appearance
- June 22, 1899, for the Washington Senators

MLB statistics
- Batting average: .257
- Home runs: 3
- Runs batted in: 48
- Stats at Baseball Reference

Teams
- Louisville Colonels (1896); Brooklyn Superbas (1899); Washington Senators (1899)

Peter Francis Cassidy (April 8, 1873 – July 9, 1929) was an American Major League Baseball first baseman who played for the Louisville Colonels in 1896 and the Brooklyn Superbas and Washington Senators in 1899. He appeared in 101 games in the major leagues over those two seasons.
