= Jay Hughes =

American baseball player (1874–1924)

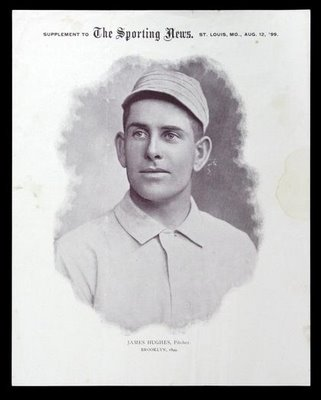
- Pitcher
- Born: January 22, 1874; Sacramento, California, U.S.
- Died: June 2, 1924 (aged 50); Sacramento, California, U.S.
- Batted: Right Threw: Right

MLB debut
- April 18, 1898, for the Baltimore Orioles

Last MLB appearance
- September 27, 1902, for the Brooklyn Superbas

MLB statistics
- Win–loss record: 83–40
- Earned run average: 3.02
- Strikeouts: 363
- Stats at Baseball Reference

Teams
- Baltimore Orioles (1898); Brooklyn Superbas (1899, 1901–1902)

Career highlights and awards
- NL wins leader (1899); Pitched a no-hitter on April 22, 1898

James H. "Jay" Hughes (January 22, 1874 – June 2, 1924) was an American Major League Baseball pitcher who played four seasons from 1898 to 1902.

== Career ==
Hughes was born in Sacramento, California, in 1874. He attracted attention in 1897 when he threw a three-hit shutout during a west coast exhibition game against the famed Baltimore Orioles, a team featuring such notable baseball stars as Wilbert Robinson, John McGraw, Hughie Jennings, Willie Keeler, and Joe Kelley. Orioles manager Ned Hanlon hired him and brought him east, where he played four seasons.

Hughes started his National League (NL) career with two consecutive shutouts, a feat that would not be achieved again by an NL rookie until Al Worthington did so for the New York Giants in 1953. Hughes pitched a no-hitter on April 22, 1898 (another no-hitter, by Cincinnati's Ted Breitenstein, was thrown the same day, marking the first time that two no-hitters were thrown on the same day). Hughes was transferred to the Brooklyn Superbas in 1899; the Orioles and Superbas were both owned by the same group of individuals. Jennings, Keeler, and several other key Orioles were transferred, including manager Hanlon, who had an ownership stake. Hughes won a league-leading 28 games for the 1899 Superbas.

Preferring to play on the west coast, Hughes joined the Pacific Coast League in 1903. As a Sacramento native, he disliked pitching in the east, and on several occasions refused to sign contracts with eastern clubs so he could remain on the west coast. In 1903, playing for the Seattle Rainiers, he tied Doc Newton for the lead in wins with 34, including 12 in a row from September 8 through November 4. Hughes pitched there until a back injury ended his career.

Hughes died in 1924 when he fell from a train in Sacramento, fracturing his skull. He was laid to rest at St. Joseph Cemetery in Sacramento.

== See also ==
- List of Major League Baseball annual wins leaders
- List of Major League Baseball no-hitters

Achievements
Preceded by Ted Breitenstein	No-hitter pitcher April 22, 1898	Succeeded by Red Donahue
