= Dan McFarlan =

American baseball player (1873–1924)

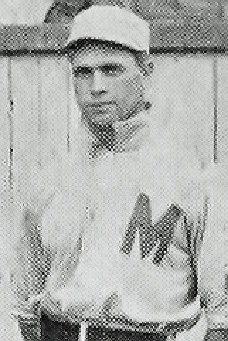
- Pitcher
- Born: November 1, 1873; Gainesville, Texas, U.S.
- Died: September 23, 1924 (aged 50); Louisville, Kentucky, U.S.
- Batted: Unknown Threw: Unknown

MLB debut
- September 2, 1895, for the Louisville Colonels

Last MLB appearance
- September 29, 1899, for the Washington Senators

MLB statistics
- Win–loss record: 8–25
- Earned run average: 5.02
- Strikeouts: 51
- Stats at Baseball Reference

Teams
- Louisville Colonels (1895); Brooklyn Superbas (1899); Washington Senators (1899)

Anderson Daniel McFarlan (November 1, 1873 – September 23, 1924) was an American Major League Baseball pitcher. He played in 1895 for the Louisville Colonels, and 1899 for two different teams, the Brooklyn Superbas and Washington Senators.

McFarlan was the first player born in Texas to play in Major League Baseball.
