= Bill Magee =

American baseball player

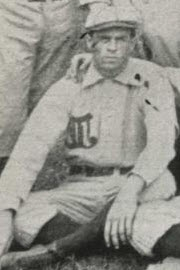
- Pitcher
- Born: July 6, 1875; New Brunswick, Canada
- Died: Unknown
- Batted: Right Threw: Right

MLB debut
- May 18, 1897, for the Louisville Colonels

Last MLB appearance
- June 7, 1902, for the Philadelphia Phillies

MLB statistics
- Win–loss record: 29-51
- Strikeouts: 161
- Earned run average: 4.94
- Stats at Baseball Reference

Teams
- Louisville Colonels (1897–99); Philadelphia Phillies (1899); Washington Senators (1899); St. Louis Cardinals (1901); New York Giants (1901–02); Philadelphia Phillies (1902)

William J. Magee (July 6, 1875 in New Brunswick, Canada) was a Major League Baseball pitcher.

A right-handed pitcher for the 1898 Louisville Colonels, Magee had a record of 16–15. He then continued his career with five National League teams in four more seasons. He walked more than twice as many batters as he struck out.

In 1907, Magee had a wife and children, when he reportedly vanished from Buffalo, New York and left his family. Magee was never seen or heard from again.
