= 1899 in baseball =

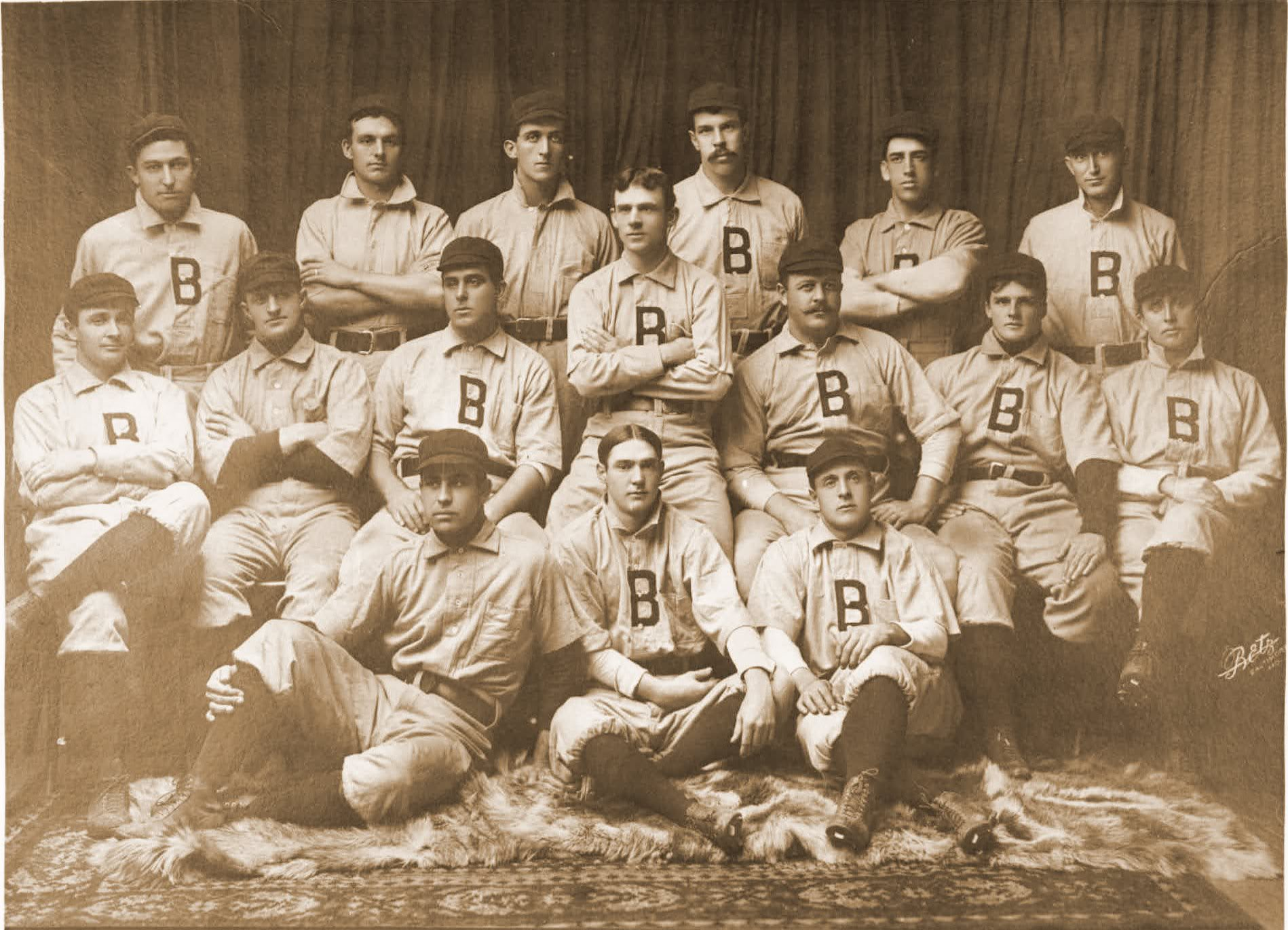
1899 Baltimore Orioles baseball

The following are the baseball events of the year 1899 throughout the world.

== Champions ==
- National League: Brooklyn Superbas

== Statistical leaders ==
National League
Stat	Player	Total
AVG	Ed Delahanty (PHI)	.410
HR	Buck Freeman (WAS)	25
RBI	Ed Delahanty (PHI)	137
W	Jay Hughes (BRO); Joe McGinnity (BAL)	28
ERA	Vic Willis (BSN)	2.50
K	Noodles Hahn (CIN)	145

== National League final standings ==
National League
Team	W	L	Pct.	GB	Home	Road
Brooklyn Superbas	101	47	.682	—	61‍–‍16	40‍–‍31
Boston Beaneaters	95	57	.625	8	53‍–‍26	42‍–‍31
Philadelphia Phillies	94	58	.618	9	58‍–‍25	36‍–‍33
Baltimore Orioles	86	62	.581	15	51‍–‍24	35‍–‍38
St. Louis Perfectos	84	67	.556	18½	50‍–‍33	34‍–‍34
Cincinnati Reds	83	67	.553	19	57‍–‍29	26‍–‍38
Pittsburgh Pirates	76	73	.510	25½	49‍–‍34	27‍–‍39
Chicago Orphans	75	73	.507	26	44‍–‍39	31‍–‍34
Louisville Colonels	75	77	.493	28	33‍–‍28	42‍–‍49
New York Giants	60	90	.400	42	35‍–‍38	25‍–‍52
Washington Senators	54	98	.355	49	35‍–‍43	19‍–‍55
Cleveland Spiders	20	134	.130	84	9‍–‍33	11‍–‍101

Locations of teams for the 1899 National League season
National League

== Events ==
- March 28 – The contract of pitcher Cy Young is sold by the Cleveland Spiders to St. Louis.
- March 29 – The contracts of Patsy Tebeau, Harry Blake, Frank Bates, Jimmy Burke, Jesse Burkett, Cupid Childs, Lou Criger, George Cuppy, Cowboy Jones, Emmet Heidrick, Pete McBride, Jack O'Connor, Ed McKean, Jack Powell, Ossee Schrecongost, Bobby Wallace, and Zeke Wilson are all transferred from the Cleveland Spiders to St. Louis. The Spiders are then stocked with cast offs and fringe players and would finish with a 20–134 record, the worst ever in baseball.
- May 15 – Willie Keeler, known as one of the smallest players and best bunters in baseball, drives the ball past startled left fielder Ed Delahanty of the Philadelphia Phillies for an inside-the-park grand slam and an 8–5 victory for the Brooklyn Superbas.
- May 18 – Jack Clements is released by the Cleveland Spiders.
- May 25 – Deacon Phillippe of the Louisville Colonels pitches a 7–0 no-hitter against the New York Giants.
- June 2 – The Cleveland Spiders blow a 10–0 lead, eventually losing 11–10 to the Brooklyn Superbas.
- June 5 – Frank Bates and Osse Schrecongost are traded by St. Louis back to the Cleveland Spiders in exchange for Lave Cross and Willie Sudhoff.
- June 10 – Kid Carsey is released by the Cleveland Spiders.
- June 24 – St. Louis purchases the contract of outfielder Mike Donlin from Santa Cruz of the California League.
- July 1 – The Pittsburgh Pirates purchase the contract of pitcher Jack Chesbro from the Richmond Giants of the Atlantic League.
- July 28 – The All Cubans begins a barnstorming tour of the U.S. with a 12-4 win over a local team at Weehawken, New Jersey
- August 7 – Vic Willis leads the Boston Beaneaters to a 7–1 victory by pitching a no-hitter against the Washington Senators.
- September 9 – The Cincinnati Reds purchase Sam Crawford from Grand Rapids of the Western League. Crawford would eventually end up in the Hall of Fame as a member of the Detroit Tigers.
- September 12 – The Cleveland Spiders lose both games of a doubleheader against the Philadelphia Phillies. At 19–114, they break the record for most losses by an MLB team in a single season, which had previously been 113.
- September 18 - The Cleveland Spiders defeated the Washington Senators in the first game of a double header, 5–4. It would be the last win in franchise history.
- October 1 – The Cleveland Spiders play their last home game, a 19–3 loss to Cincinnati. In that game, the Spiders recruited local semi-pro Eddie Kolb to pitch. It would be the 18 year old rookie's only MLB appearance.
- October 11 – Magnates of the Western League agree to reorganize themselves into the American League.
- October 15 – The Cleveland Spiders lose both games of their season-ending doubleheader against the Cincinnati Reds by scores of 16–1 and 19–3. Having lost 40 of their last 41 games, they finish the season in last place with a record of 20–134.

Buck Freeman of the Washington Senators leads all batters with 25 home runs during the regular season, more than double hit by Bobby Wallace of the St. Louis Perfectos, who finished with 12 homers. Although Freeman failed to equal the record of 27 home runs set by Ned Williamson in the 1884 season, his total is generally regarded as the greater achievement owing to the dimensions of Williamson's home ballpark of Lakeshore Park – Only two of the 27 homers batted by Williamson for the Chicago White Stockings were scored away from home. Freeman's tally was not surpassed until 1919, when Babe Ruth belted 29 home runs for the Boston Red Sox.

Following the season, the Baltimore Orioles, Cleveland Spiders, Louisville Colonels and Washington Senators were all dropped by the National League, as a cost-cutting measure, reducing the number of teams to eight for the 1900 season; while Louisville would never sport another major-league level team, the other three cities received charter franchises in the rival American League in 1901 – after being abandoned by the AL in 1971, the National League would return to the nation's capital 106 years later. The National League would remain at eight teams until 1962.

== Births ==
=== January ===
- January 3 – Buzz Arlett
- January 5 – Bill Hunnefield
- January 5 – Bob Kinsella
- January 6 – Charles Beverly
- January 9 – Bill Conroy
- January 11 – General Crowder
- January 12 – Joe Hauser
- January 13 – Cactus Keck
- January 14 – Ralph Miller
- January 16 – Showboat Fisher
- January 17 – Tripp Sigman
- January 18 – Eddie Moore
- January 21 – Lew Fonseca
- January 23 – Haddie Gill
- January 23 – Bill Regan
- January 24 – Bob Berman
- January 27 – Bob Barrett
- January 27 – Bibb Falk
- January 29 – Script Lee
- January 29 – Ollie Voigt
- January 31 – Don Songer

=== February ===
- February 6 – Walt Huntzinger
- February 7 – Earl Whitehill
- February 9 – Specs Toporcer
- February 10 – Bill Whaley
- February 13 – George Stutz
- February 17
  - Leo Najo
  - Peahead Walker
- February 24 – Pinky Pittenger
- February 25 – Stan Rees
- February 27 – Pat McNulty
- February 28 – Lil Stoner

=== March ===
- March 1 – Ernie Padgett
- March 2 – George Stueland
- March 4 – Dutch Kemner
- March 13 – Otis Brannan
- March 16 – Vic Keen
- March 17 – Charlie Root
- March 27 – Ed Hock
- March 27 – Marty Walker
- March 28 – Al Hermann
- March 29 – Herb McQuaid
- March 30 – Hal Rhyne
- March 31 – Ed Johnson

=== April ===
- April 5 – Tony Welzer
- April 8 – Ted Kleinhans
- April 8 – Lerton Pinto
- April 10 – Rudy Kneisch
- April 12 – Bernie Henderson
- April 12 – Trader Horne
- April 18 – Bill Bayne
- April 18 – Harry Hulihan
- April 29 – Frank McGee

=== May ===
- May 2 – Skinny O'Neal
- May 2 – Gale Staley
- May 7 – Eddie Pick
- May 8 – Fritz Henrich
- May 10 – Freddie Maguire
- May 12 – Tod Dennehey
- May 14 – Earle Combs
- May 23 – Frank Kelliher
- May 23 – Charlie Niebergall
- May 25 – Jimmie Keenan
- May 28 – Bob Rice
- May 29 – Hal Elliott
- May 29 – Art Reinhart

=== June ===
- June 1 – Al Niehaus
- June 2 – Sloppy Thurston
- June 3 – Urbane Pickering
- June 7 – Lafayette Henion
- June 11 – Horace Allen
- June 14 – William Pierson
- June 22 – Leo Moon
- June 25 – June Greene

=== July ===
- July 6 – Lenny Metz
- July 9 – Fred Johnston
- July 10 – Wally Kopf
- July 11 – Binky Jones
- July 12 – Walt French
- July 16 – Nellie Pott
- July 17 – Red Smith
- July 19 – Joe Kiefer
- July 20 – Happy Foreman
- July 23 – Ed Holley
- July 23 – Chuck Rowland
- July 27 – Jim Faulkner
- July 29 – Walter Beall

=== August ===
- August 1 – Joe Shaute
- August 2 – Tink Riviere
- August 4 – Ski Melillo
- August 5 – Sam Gibson
- August 5 – Slim McGrew
- August 7 – Guy Sturdy
- August 7 – Ted Wingfield
- August 11 – Frank Brazill
- August 12 – Bill Black
- August 14 – Skinny Graham
- August 18 – Bernie Friberg
- August 22 – Dud Lee
- August 25 – Pea Ridge Day

=== September ===
- September 5 – Max Bishop
- September 6 – Del Bissonette
- September 7 – Clarence Winters
- September 8 – George Gilham
- September 9 – Waite Hoyt
- September 10 – Augie Johns
- September 15 – Harry McCurdy
- September 16 – Heinie Mueller
- September 17 – Sheriff Blake
- September 20 – Nelson Greene
- September 20 – Karl Schnell
- September 21 – Del Lundgren
- September 25 – Hoge Workman

=== October ===
- October 11 – Eddie Dyer
- October 11 – Ernie Smith
- October 12 – Bub Kuhn
- October 15 – John Chapman
- October 22 – Ike Kahdot
- October 22 – Geechie Meredith
- October 24 – Cuckoo Christensen
- October 26 – Judy Johnson
- October 26 – Otto Vogel
- October 28 – Percy Jones

=== November ===
- November 5 – Jack Wisner
- November 6 – Joe Munson
- November 9 – George Abrams
- November 11 – Bill Vargus
- November 18 – Ren Kelly
- November 18 – Dutch Ulrich
- November 21 – Charlie Gibson
- November 21 – Augie Swentor
- November 27 – Lena Styles
- November 30 – Reuben Ewing

=== December ===
- December 2 – Ray Morehart
- December 6 – Jocko Conlan
- December 7 – Ed Morris
- December 10 – Verdo Elmore
- December 10 – Jake Hehl
- December 11 – Willie Gisentaner
- December 12 – Allie Watt
- December 13 – Buckshot May
- December 14 – Bob Lawrence
- December 18 – Sam Barnes
- December 19 – Sam Dodge
- December 20 – George Pipgras
- December 23 – Waddy MacPhee
- December 23 – Tommy Thomas
- December 25 – Tom Gulley
- December 25 – Gene Robertson
- December 26 – Logan Drake
- December 26 – Art Gardiner

== Deaths ==
- January 6 – John Smith, 40, first baseman for the Troy Trojans and Worcester Ruby Legs of the National League in the 1882 season.
- January 13 – Fred Carl, 40, outfielder.
- January 17 – Billy Arnold, 47, outfielder.
- March 6 – Edward Santry, 38, shortstop.
- March 9 – Bill McGunnigle, 44, manager who led Brooklyn to the American Association title in 1889, and the National League pennant the following year after the team switched leagues; as collegiate catcher, was possibly the first at that position to wear a glove.
- March 16 – Egyptian Healy, 32, pitcher.
- April 9 – Mike Moynahan, 43, shortstop.
- April 24 – Pat Luby, 30, pitcher.
- July 14 – Frank Kreeger, [?], outfielder and pitcher.
- July 24 – Jim Korwan, 25, pitcher.
- August 10 – Henry Buker, 40, shortstop.
- September 17 – John Haldeman, 43, journalist and business manager for the Louisville Courier-Journal, who played second base in one game for the 1877 Louisville Grays.
- November 2 – Tim McGinley, 45, catcher.
- December 1 – Ed Gastfield, 34, catcher.
- December 14 – Harry Dooms, 32, outfielder.
- December 16 – Fred Waterman, 54, third baseman, member of the 1869 Cincinnati Red Stockings team that went undefeated.
- December 18 – Fred Truax, 31, outfielder
