= Cleveland Spiders all-time roster =

List of baseball players

The following is a list of players and who appeared in at least one game for the Cleveland Spiders franchise of Major League Baseball from 1887 through 1899. This includes both the Cleveland Blues of the American Association and the Cleveland Spiders of the National League. Players in bold are in the Baseball Hall of Fame.

== A ==
- Gus Alberts
- Myron Allen
- Pete Allen
- Billy Alvord
- Joe Ardner

== B ==
- Jersey Bakley
- Frank Bates
- Ed Beatin
- Ira Belden
- Ed Biecher
- Harry Blake
- Frank Boyd
- George Bristow
- Charlie Brown
- Jimmy Burke
- **Jesse Burkett**

== C ==
- Scrappy Carroll
- Kid Carsey
- Elton Chamberlain
- Cupid Childs
- Henry Clarke
- **John Clarkson**
- Jack Clements
- Harry Colliflower
- Bill Collins
- Fred Cooke
- Lou Criger
- Lave Cross
- Billy Crowell
- George Cuppy

== D ==
- Vince Dailey
- Hugh Daily
- Joe Daly
- George Davies
- **George Davis**
- Tom Delahanty
- Bill Delaney
- Jerry Denny
- Fred Donovan
- Tommy Dowd
- Tom Dowse
- Jack Doyle
- Jim Duncan

== E ==
- **Buck Ewing**

== F ==
- Jay Faatz
- Chauncey Fisher
- Ed Flynn
- Fred Frank
- Chick Fraser

== G ==
- Bill Garfield
- Dale Gear
- Charlie Getzien
- Bob Gilks
- Jim Gilman
- Mike Goodfellow
- Ed Gremminger
- Frank Griffith
- Henry Gruber
- Joe Gunson

== H ==
- Dick Harley
- Jack Harper
- Charlie Hastings
- Emmet Heidrick
- Charlie Hemphill
- Ed Herr
- Bill Hill
- Mortimer Hogan
- Pete Hotaling
- Jim Hughey

== J ==
- Spud Johnson
- Cowboy Jones

== K ==
- Ed Keas
- George Kelb
- Henry Killeen
- John Kirby
- Frank Knauss
- Phil Knell
- Charlie Knepper
- Ed Knouff
- Eddie Kolb
- Otto Krueger

== L ==
- Ezra Lincoln
- Harry Lochhead
- Pat Lyons
- John Lyston

== M ==
- Fred Mann
- Harry Maupin
- Jimmy McAleer
- Sport McAllister
- Pete McBride
- Bill McClellan
- Mike McDermott
- Ed McFarland
- Chippy McGarr
- John McGlone
- Deacon McGuire
- Ed McKean
- Mike Morrison
- Tony Mullane
- John Munyan

== O ==
- Doc Oberlander
- Cinders O'Brien
- Jack O'Connor
- Tom O'Meara

== P ==
- John Pappalau
- Charlie Parsons
- George Pechiney
- Charlie Petty
- Ollie Pickering
- Jack Powell
- George Proeser

== Q ==
- Joe Quinn

== R ==
- Paul Radford
- Phil Reccius
- Charlie Reipschlager
- George Rettger

== S ==
- Jimmy Say
- Frank Scheibeck
- Jack Scheible
- Crazy Schmit
- Ossee Schreckengost
- Ed Seward
- John Shearon
- Hank Simon
- Will Smalley
- Edgar Smith
- Pop Snyder
- Louis Sockalexis
- Joe Sommer
- Andy Sommers
- Charlie Sprague
- John Stafford
- Bill Stemmyer
- Jack Stivetts
- Len Stockwell
- Cub Stricker
- Willie Sudhoff
- Joe Sugden
- Marty Sullivan
- Mike Sullivan
- Suter Sullivan
- Sy Sutcliffe
- Charlie Sweeney

== T ==
- George Tebeau
- Patsy Tebeau
- Pussy Tebeau
- Tom Thomas
- Jim Toy
- Tommy Tucker
- Larry Twitchell

== V ==
- Dick Van Zant
- Peek-A-Boo Veach
- Lee Viau
- Jake Virtue

== W ==
- Jack Wadsworth
- **Bobby Wallace**
- Buck West
- Tom Williams
- Highball Wilson
- Zeke Wilson
- Rasty Wright

== Y ==
- **Cy Young**

== Z ==
- Charlie Ziegler
- Chief Zimmer
