= 1899 Cleveland Spiders season =

1899 Cleveland Spiders
- League: National League
- Ballpark: League Park
- City: Cleveland, Ohio
- Record: 20–134 (.130)
- League place: 12th
- Owners: Frank Robison
- Managers: Lave Cross; Joe Quinn

The 1899 Cleveland Spiders season was the team's 13th and final season in Major League Baseball (MLB), and their 11th season in the National League (NL).

The Spiders' team owners, the Robison family, also owned the St. Louis Perfectos. To strengthen the Perfectos, they transferred the Spiders' best players to St. Louis before the season, leaving Cleveland with a severely depleted roster. As the Spiders played abysmally and continued to lose that season, fans stopped attending their home games, and other teams refused to travel to Cleveland to play road games against the Spiders. This resulted in the Spiders being forced to play most of their games on the road.

The Spiders finished in 12th place, last in the NL, with a record of 20–134 (.130). This remains the worst single-season record for an MLB team in terms of both losses and of winning percentage (.130). The team allowed 1,252 runs while only scoring 529, a run differential of −723 for the season, the worst in MLB history. Spiders pitchers hit 109 batters, setting an MLB single-season record that would stand for 123 years until the 2022 Cincinnati Reds hit 110 batters.

== Offseason ==
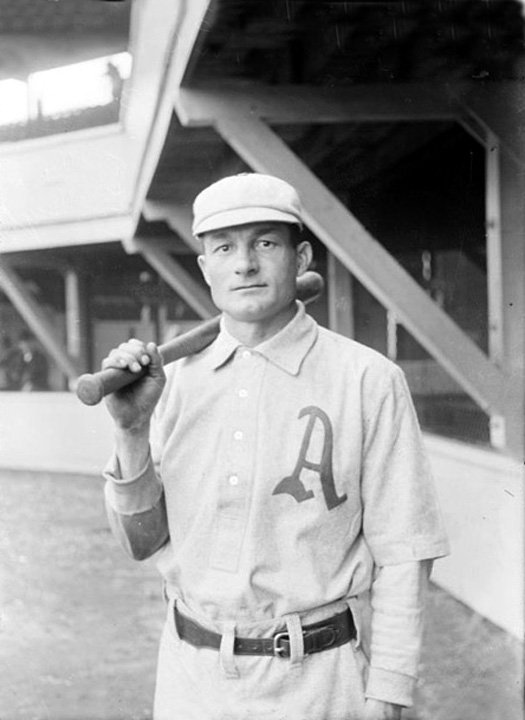
Manager and third baseman Lave Cross

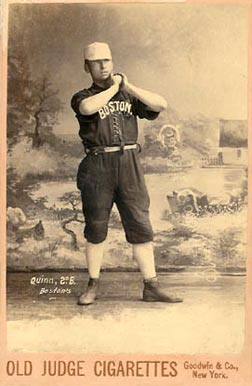
Manager and second baseman Joe Quinn

In early 1899, the owners of the Spiders, brothers Frank and Stanley Robison, bought the St. Louis Browns baseball club from Chris von der Ahe, renaming it the Perfectos. However, they continued to retain ownership of the Cleveland club, an obvious conflict of interest that was later prohibited by MLB.

The Robisons decided that a good team in St. Louis would draw more fans, so they transferred most of the Cleveland stars, including future Hall of Famers Cy Young, Jesse Burkett, and Bobby Wallace, as well as manager Patsy Tebeau to St. Louis. Most of the players Cleveland received were non-entities. Jack Clements (known to history as one of MLB's few left-handed throwing catchers) and Joe Quinn were at the end of successful careers, and player-manager Lave Cross was traded back to St. Louis after the Spiders got off to an 8–30 start.

According to various individual pages at Baseball-Reference.com, most of this activity took place on March 29, 1899, just 17 days before the beginning of the new season:

Pitchers
Frank Bates, George Cuppy, Cowboy Jones, Pete McBride, Jack Powell, Zeke Wilson, Cy Young to St. Louis
Kid Carsey, Jim Hughey, Harry Maupin, Willie Sudhoff to Cleveland

Catchers
Lou Criger, Jack O'Connor to St. Louis
Jack Clements, Joe Sugden to Cleveland

Infielders
Jimmy Burke, Cupid Childs, Ed McKean, Ossee Schreckengost, Bobby Wallace to St. Louis
Patsy Tebeau to St. Louis (to be manager)
Joe Quinn, Suter Sullivan, Tommy Tucker to Cleveland
Lave Cross to Cleveland (to be player-manager)

Outfielders
Harry Blake, Jesse Burkett, Emmet Heidrick to St. Louis
Tommy Dowd, Dick Harley to Cleveland

They also transferred numerous home games to the road—including the original Opening Day game to St. Louis. As a result, the Spiders did not play their first home game until May 1.

In early April, the Spiders started training in Terre Haute, Indiana. Because of the cold weather, the team had to practice inside a gymnasium.

== Regular season ==
With a decimated roster, it was apparent almost from the start that the Spiders would make a wretched showing. After their first game, in which they were beaten by the Perfectos, 10–1, the headline of the April 16 edition of The Plain Dealer proved to be prescient: "THE FARCE HAS BEGUN."

After a poor start on the road, the Spiders played a home-opening doubleheader on May 1 in front of 100 fans. They split the two games, moving up to 11th place. However, they were back in last before long.

On June 2, the Spiders led the Brooklyn Superbas, 10–0, in the sixth inning, but they blew the lead and ended up losing, 11–10. On June 11, the Spiders lost to the Cincinnati Reds, 10–1, behind Frank Bates' poor pitching. It was the Spiders' 11th straight loss on that road trip. The following day, the Spiders returned home and lost to the Pittsburgh Pirates in front of 58 fans. The team kept losing games, and losses came more and more frequently as the season went on.

"Of course, the Clevelands did not win the game, and it is hard to see when they will win a game so long as they persist in playing Bates. The young man demonstrated long ago that he is not fast enough even for the tail-enders of the big organization. He had little speed today, was quite as wild as usual, and the Brooklyns had little or no trouble in making runs and plenty of them."

— Cleveland Plain Dealer, August 17, 1899

On August 16, with Bates pitching, the Spiders lost to the Superbas, 13–2. This led to criticism from the Cleveland Plain Dealer. On August 18, the first-place Superbas completed their sweep of the Spiders, outscoring them, 43–8, in four games.

The Spiders notched their 100th loss of the season on August 31, falling to the Superbas, 9–3. Two days later, the Spiders played a local amateur team in Johnstown, Pennsylvania, and lost, 7–5. On September 12, the Spiders lost both games of a doubleheader to the Philadelphia Phillies. At that point, they were 19–114 and had broken the MLB single-season record for losses, which had been 113.

On October 15, the Spiders ended their season by losing both games of a doubleheader to the Cincinnati Reds, by scores of 16–1 and 19–3. The Spiders finished in 12th place, last in the NL. After losing 40 of their last 41 games, they had a record of 20–134 (.130). Their record is still the worst in Major League Baseball history. They trailed the pennant-winning Brooklyn Superbas by 84 games, and finished 35 games behind the 11th place Washington Senators. For comparison, this would project to 21–141 under the current schedule, and Pythagorean expectation based on the Spiders' results and the current 162-game schedule would translate to a record of 25–137.

The 1899 Spiders were 9–33 (.214) at home and 11–101 (.098) on the road. The team's longest winning streak of the season was two games, which they accomplished once: on May 20 against the Phillies and May 21 against the Colonels. They also accumulated the second-longest losing streak in league history, at 24 games from August 26 to September 16, trailing only the 26-game losing streak set by the 1889 Louisville Colonels. The Spiders were winless against two teams: Brooklyn and Cincinnati.

Spiders opponents scored ten or more runs 49 times in 154 games. Pitchers Jim Hughey (4–30) and Charlie Knepper (4–22) tied for the team lead in wins. The pitching staff allowed a record 1,252 runs in 154 games. The Spiders batters combined to hit 12 home runs, matching former Spiders star Bobby Wallace, who hit 12 home runs for St. Louis.

The 1899 Spiders did lead the league in one statistic—games played. Cleveland was the only team in the league to finish all of its games in the then-154 game schedule of the 1899 season, a rather unusual occurrence in that era.

In terms of absolute numbers, the record for futility of 20 wins in any official MLB season stood until the COVID-19 pandemic shortened the 2020 season to only 60 games; even then, 29 of the then-30 teams managed to win more than 20 games with the Pittsburgh Pirates, who finished 19–41, winning one less game than the 1899 Spiders.

Due to poor attendance, the Spiders played 112 road games, as a result of 35 of their planned home games being moved. The only time this number has ever been threatened was in 1994 when the Seattle Mariners were forced to play the remainder of their season on the road due to a ceiling break at the Kingdome in late July of that season, which would have broken the record with 118 road games before the strike cut the season short with the Mariners having played only 68 of those road games.

=== Attendance ===
"Mournfully the Clevelands departed for the west this afternoon with nothing to show for their pilgrimage east but three games lost and a few dollars that barely compensated for making the trip. The Clevelands are so utterly bad that they can't even draw in a city where the prospective champions are playing."

— Cleveland Plain Dealer, September 2, 1899

In early 1899, team Robison Brothers publicly announced their intention to run the Spiders "as a sideshow", and fans took them at their word: after the first 16 home games, Cleveland's total attendance was 3,179, for a trifling average of 199 people per game. As a result, other NL teams refused to travel to Cleveland's League Park, since their cut of the ticket revenue would not even come close to covering their travel and hotel expenses. Soon after the season began and the losses started to pile up, sportswriters of the day began referring to the team as the "Exiles" and "Wanderers."

As a result, the Spiders only played 26 more home games for the rest of the season, including only eight after July 1. Their records of 112 road games and 101 road losses will never be threatened: it is currently unbreakable under MLB's current scheduling practices, where a team plays a maximum of 81 road games. The only time it was even considered approachable was the aforementioned 1994 Mariners, but the strike of that season ended the possibility of them breaking the record, and no team has played more than 81 road games since then (not counting 1 or 3 game tiebreaker playoff games).

A mere 6,088 fans paid for Spiders home games in 1899, an average of 145 people per game. By comparison, St. Louis drew 373,909 fans for their home season, including 15,000 for one game (their home opener against the Spiders).

=== Aftermath ===
The dismal 1899 season was the end for the Spiders, and for National League baseball in Cleveland. The Spiders were disbanded, along with the original Baltimore Orioles, the Louisville Colonels (Louisville, nor the entire state of Kentucky, has had another professional sports team since), and the original Washington Senators, as the National League contracted from 12 teams to 8.

The departure of baseball from Cleveland left an opening for the upstart American League, which opened for business in 1901 as a second major league and included among its charter members a new team, the Cleveland Blues. The Blues still exist today as the Cleveland Guardians. Currently, the 2024 Chicago White Sox (121) has the post-1900 AL and MLB records for most losses in a season. After the Spiders folded, a National League team would not play in Cleveland again until the Brooklyn Robins visited the then-Cleveland Indians in the 1920 World Series. Meanwhile, in St. Louis, the Perfectos were renamed the St. Louis Cardinals in 1900, which they are still called today. The Robisons purchasing of the Browns/Perfectos/Cardinals essentially began a turnaround for the organization, as they eventually became one of the most recognizable teams in baseball in the 20th century, appearing in 15 World Series and winning 9.

=== Season standings ===
National League
Team	W	L	Pct.	GB	Home	Road
Brooklyn Superbas	101	47	.682	—	61‍–‍16	40‍–‍31
Boston Beaneaters	95	57	.625	8	53‍–‍26	42‍–‍31
Philadelphia Phillies	94	58	.618	9	58‍–‍25	36‍–‍33
Baltimore Orioles	86	62	.581	15	51‍–‍24	35‍–‍38
St. Louis Perfectos	84	67	.556	18½	50‍–‍33	34‍–‍34
Cincinnati Reds	83	67	.553	19	57‍–‍29	26‍–‍38
Pittsburgh Pirates	76	73	.510	25½	49‍–‍34	27‍–‍39
Chicago Orphans	75	73	.507	26	44‍–‍39	31‍–‍34
Louisville Colonels	75	77	.493	28	33‍–‍28	42‍–‍49
New York Giants	60	90	.400	42	35‍–‍38	25‍–‍52
Washington Senators	54	98	.355	49	35‍–‍43	19‍–‍55
Cleveland Spiders	20	134	.130	84	9‍–‍33	11‍–‍101

=== Record vs. opponents ===
1899 National League record Sources:
Team	BAL	BSN	BRO	CHI	CIN	CLE	LOU	NYG	PHI	PIT	STL	WAS
Baltimore	—	7–7	6–8	9–5	4–9	12–2	6–7–2	10–4	6–7–1	9–3	8–6	9–4–1
Boston	7–7	—	6–8	5–7	10–4	11–3	9–5	12–2	5–9	10–4	8–6	12–2–1
Brooklyn	8–6	8–6	—	8–5–1	7–6	14–0	11–3	10–4	8–6	8–6	8–4–1	11–3
Chicago	5–9	7–5	5–8–1	—	8–6	13–1	7–7	7–6–1	5–9	6–7–2	8–6	4–9
Cincinnati	9–4	4–10	6–7	6–8	—	14–0	8–6	9–5–1	4–10	10–3–3	5–8–2	8–6–1
Cleveland	2–12	3–11	0–14	1–13	0–14	—	4–10	1–13	2–12	2–12	1–13	4–10
Louisville	7–6–2	5–9	3–11	7–7	6–8	10–4	—	7–7	7–6	6–8–1	5–9–1	12–2
New York	4–10	2–12	2–10	6–7–1	5–9–1	13–1	7–7	—	4–10–1	6–7	4–10	7–7
Philadelphia	7–6–1	9–5	6–8	9–5	10–4	12–2	6–7	10–4–1	—	6–8	7–7	12–2
Pittsburgh	3–9	4–10	6–8	7–6–2	3–10–3	12–2	8–6–1	7–6	8–6	—	7–7	11–3
St. Louis	6–8	6–8	4–8–1	6–8	8–5–2	13–1	9–5–1	10–4	7–7	7–7	—	8–6
Washington	4–9–1	2–12–1	3–11	9–4	6–8–1	10–4	2–12	7–7	2–12	3–11	6–8	—

=== Notable transactions ===
- June 5, 1899: Some of the March 29 activity was undone. Willie Sudhoff and Lave Cross were sent by the Spiders back to the Perfectos, with Frank Bates and Ossee Schreckengost coming back to Cleveland.

=== Roster ===
1899 Cleveland Spiders
Roster
Pitchers: Frank Bates; Kid Carsey; Harry Colliflower; Jack Harper; Bill Hill; Jim Hughey; Charlie Knepper; Eddie Kolb; Harry Maupin; Crazy Schmit; Willie Sudhoff; Highball Wilson	Catchers: Jack Clements; Ossee Schreckengost; Joe Sugden; Chief Zimmer; Infielders: Lave Cross; Jim Duncan; Otto Krueger; Harry Lochhead; Joe Quinn; Suter Sullivan; Tommy Tucker; Charlie Ziegler	Outfielders: George Bristow; Tommy Dowd; Dick Harley; Charlie Hemphill; Sport McAllister; Louis Sockalexis; Jack Stivetts	Manager: Lave Cross; Joe Quinn

== Player stats ==
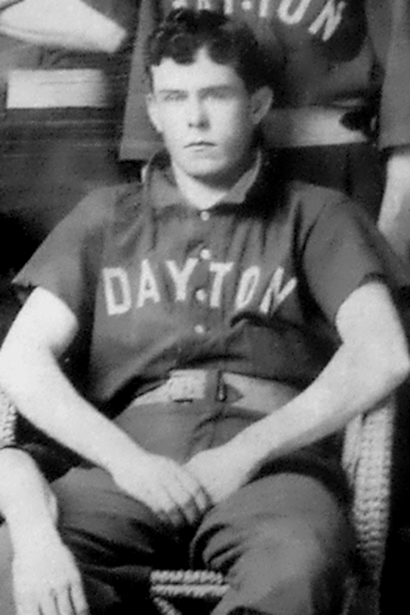
Pitcher Frank Bates

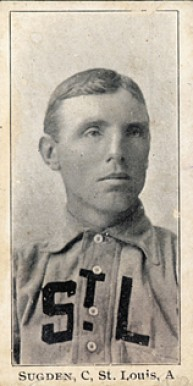
Catcher Joe Sugden

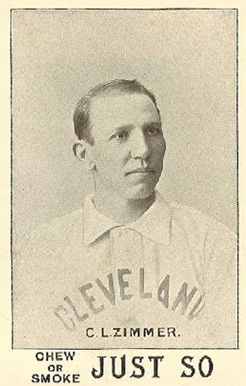
Catcher Chief Zimmer

=== Batting ===
==== Starters by position ====
Note: Pos = Position; G = Games played; AB = At bats; H = Hits; Avg. = Batting average; HR = Home runs; RBI = Runs batted in

Pos	Player	G	AB	H	Avg.	HR	RBI
C	Joe Sugden	76	250	69	.276	0	14
1B	Tommy Tucker	127	456	110	.241	0	40
2B	Joe Quinn	147	615	176	.286	0	72
3B	Suter Sullivan	127	473	116	.245	0	55
SS	Harry Lochhead	148	541	129	.238	1	43
OF	Tommy Dowd	147	605	168	.278	2	35
OF	Dick Harley	142	567	142	.250	1	50
OF	Sport McAllister	113	418	99	.237	1	31

==== Other batters ====
Note: G = Games played; AB = At bats; H = Hits; Avg. = Batting average; HR = Home runs; RBI = Runs batted in

Player	G	AB	H	Avg.	HR	RBI
Charlie Hemphill	55	202	56	.277	2	23
Lave Cross	38	154	44	.286	1	20
Ossee Schreckengost	43	150	47	.313	0	10
Jim Duncan	31	105	24	.229	2	9
Chief Zimmer	20	73	25	.342	2	14
Otto Krueger	13	44	10	.227	0	2
Jack Stivetts	18	39	8	.205	0	2
Louis Sockalexis	7	22	6	.273	0	3
Jack Clements	4	12	3	.250	0	0
George Bristow	3	8	1	.125	0	0
Charlie Ziegler	2	8	2	.250	0	0

=== Pitching ===
==== Starting pitchers ====
Note: G = Games pitched; IP = Innings pitched; W = Wins; L = Losses; ERA = Earned run average; SO = Strikeouts

Player	G	IP	W	L	ERA	SO
Jim Hughey	36	283.0	4	30	5.41	54
Charlie Knepper	27	219.2	4	22	5.78	43
Frank Bates	20	153.0	1	18	7.24	13
Crazy Schmit	20	138.1	2	17	5.86	24
Harry Colliflower	14	98.0	1	11	8.17	8
Willie Sudhoff	11	86.1	3	8	6.98	10
Kid Carsey	10	77.2	1	8	5.68	11
Bill Hill	11	72.1	3	6	6.97	26
Jack Harper	5	37.0	1	4	3.89	14
Highball Wilson	1	8.0	0	1	9.00	1
Eddie Kolb	1	8.0	0	1	10.13	1

==== Other pitchers ====
Note: G = Games pitched; IP = Innings pitched; W = Wins; L = Losses; ERA = Earned run average; SO = Strikeouts

Player	G	IP	W	L	ERA	SO
Harry Maupin	5	25.0	0	3	12.60	3

== See also ==
- List of worst Major League Baseball season records
- List of Major League Baseball records considered unbreakable
- Cleveland sports curse
- 1962 New York Mets season (120 losses)
- 2024 Chicago White Sox season (121 losses)

== Sources ==
- Hetrick, J. Thomas (1999). Misfits! Baseball's Worst Ever Team. Pocol Press. ISBN 9781929763009.
- "1899 Cleveland Spiders Statistics". Baseball Reference. 2018.
- "Major League Rules 2021" (PDF). MLBPA Agent Certification. Major League Baseball. 2021. Archived from the original (PDF) on November 29, 2020.
