= Dick Harley =

American baseball player and manager (1872–1952)

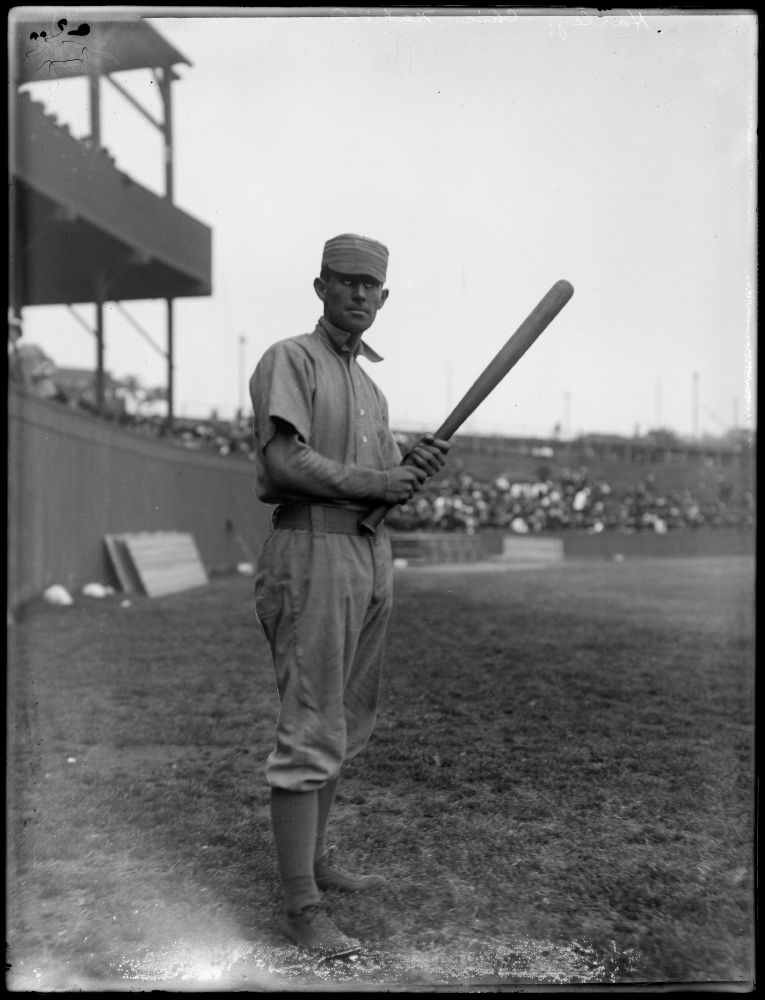
- Outfielder
- Born: September 25, 1872; Philadelphia, Pennsylvania, U.S.
- Died: March 3, 1952 (aged 79); Philadelphia, Pennsylvania, U.S.
- Batted: Left Threw: Right

MLB debut
- June 2, 1897, for the St. Louis Browns

Last MLB appearance
- September 21, 1903, for the Chicago Cubs

MLB statistics
- Batting average: .262
- Home runs: 10
- Runs batted in: 236
- Stats at Baseball Reference

Teams
- St. Louis Browns (1897–1898); Cleveland Spiders (1899); Cincinnati Reds (1900–1901); Detroit Tigers (1902); Chicago Cubs (1903)

Career highlights and awards
- Led AL in hit by pitches (1902)

Richard Joseph Harley (September 25, 1872 – April 3, 1952) was an American baseball outfielder, manager, and coach.

A native of Philadelphia, Harley played baseball and American football at Georgetown University. He then played professional baseball from 1896 to 1909, including seven years in Major League Baseball for the St. Louis Browns (1897–1898), Cleveland Spiders (1899), Cincinnati Reds (1900–1901), Detroit Tigers (1902), and Chicago Cubs (1903). During his major league career, he appeared in 741 games and compiled a .262 batting average with 96 extra-base hits, 236 RBIs, and 78 times hit by pitch.

As an outfielder, he had a strong arm, led the National League in assists in 1898, and totaled at least 20 assists in four of his seven major league seasons. He also led all National League outfielders in errors with 27 in 1899 and 30 in 1901.

Harley later served as the player-manager of the Toronto Maple Leafs of the Eastern League (1904–1905) and as a college baseball coach for Georgetown (1913), Penn State (1915–1917), and Pittsburgh (1920–1924).

== Early years ==
Harley was born in 1872 in Center Square, Montgomery County, Pa. He grew up on his family's land named Boxwood Farm located in Whitpain Township, northwest of Philadelphia.

Dick Harley home farm.

He attended Georgetown University, where he played both American football and baseball. He played at the fullback position on the football team in 1893. Although contemporary newspaper sources have not been found referring to him as a coach, modern Georgetown football media guides list Harley as the head coach of the 1893 Georgetown football team. He played at the shortstop and left field on the baseball team in the spring of 1894.

== Professional baseball ==
=== Minor leagues (1895-96) ===
During the summer of 1893, Dick played baseball with Arthur Irwin's Atlantic City, N.J. Team of All Collegians (South Jersey League). The following summer, 1894, he played with Phil King's Team of All Collegians at Cape May, N.J. During the summer of 1895 Dick played baseball for Harry Mackey's Team of All Collegians at Atlantic City. Dick was elected captain of the Georgetown nine in his sixth and final year and had standing offers from two professional baseball teams. One team, Rochester of the Eastern League, reportedly "claimed" Harley as reported by the Springfield Republican on March 25, 1895. Dick stayed in school and graduated vice-president of the Georgetown Class of 1896. After graduation, Dick immediately signed his first professional baseball contract with the Springfield Ponies (Massachusetts) of the Eastern League where he played from June 28, 1896, to September 15, 1896. Later in the fall of 1896 he was contacted by the Philadelphia Phillies who he eventually signed a contract with in December 1896 and attended their spring training camp in Augusta, Georgia for 1897. (ref. rwh220)

=== St. Louis and Cleveland (1897-99) ===
On May 29, 1897, he was traded by the Philadelphia Phillies with Bill Hallman to the St. Louis Browns in exchange for Tommy Dowd. At the time, The Philadelphia Inquirer noted that, while Harley was drawing "a big salary for a young player", he was "worth every cent he draws. That boy is a comer, if there ever was one." Harley made his major league debut on June 2, 1897, with the Browns. On June 24, 1897, he collected six hits in a 12-inning game played at Pittsburgh. During the 1897 season, he hit .288 in 90 games for the Browns. The following year, he appeared in 142 games for the Browns, but his batting average dropped by more than 40 points to .246. He was hit by a pitch for a career high 22 times in 1898. He also led all National League outfielders in 1898 with 26 assists and ranked second with 27 errors.

Prior to the start of the 1899 season, the St. Louis Browns baseball club was acquired by the owners of the Cleveland Spiders. On March 29, 1899, Harley was assigned by the St. Louis club to the Spiders. He appeared in 142 games for the 1899 Spiders and compiled a .250 batting average with a career-high 50 RBIs. He was the starting left fielder for the 1899 Cleveland Spiders, who some consider to be the worst team in baseball history. The Spiders went 20–134, scoring 529 runs and allowing 1,252 runs. Harley led all National League outfielders in 1899 with 27 errors.

=== Detroit and Cincinnati (1900-02) ===
On April 3, 1900, the Detroit Tigers purchased four former Spiders: Harley, Sport McAllister, Harry Lochhead, and Suter Sullivan. (The Tigers were part of the American League in 1900, but the league was not recognized as a major league until 1901.) Harley appeared in 123 games for the 1900 Tigers and led the team with a .325 batting average, 77 runs scored, and 47 stolen bases.

In September 1900, after the Tigers had completed their season, Harley joined the Cincinnati Reds. He appeared in five games and hit .428. However, he remained the property of the Tigers. In October 1900, Detroit club owner James D. Burns announced that he had rejected an offer of $2,000 to sell Harley, but he would sell for $3,000. One week after Burns' statement, the Reds purchased Harley from Detroit, reportedly for the $3,000 demanded by Burns.

Harley appeared in 133 games in the outfield for the 1901 Reds. He hit .273 during the 1901 season and led all National League outfielders with 30 errors. He also had 37 stolen bases in 1901, ranking fourth in the National League.

Prior to the 1902 season, Harley left the Reds and rejoined the Detroit Tigers. He appeared in 125 games for the 1902 Tigers, compiling a .281 batting average with 44 RBIs. He also led the American League in 1902 having been hit by a pitch 12 times.

=== Chicago Cubs (1903) ===
In early October 1902, Harley signed with the Chicago Cubs for the 1903 season, jumping back to the National League. Chicago manager Frank Selee moved Harley from left field to right field and said:

"Harley always appealed to me as a player of more than ordinary intelligence . . . Harley is a natural hitter, is fast on the bases, can throw well, and uses good judgment in everything he does. I feel certain that he will make a success of right field, and that the team will be stronger for having him there."

In 104 games for the 1903 Cubs, Harley hit .231. The 1903 season was Harley's last in the major leagues.

=== Major league overview ===
In his seven seasons in the major leagues, Harley appeared in 740 games, all but two as an outfielder, including 539 in left field, 106 in right field, and 93 in center field. He had a career batting average of .262 and an on-base percentage of .332 with 755 hits, 389 runs scored, 236 RBIs, 106 extra-base hits, 229 bases on balls, 139 stolen bases, and 78 times hit by a pitch.

=== Return to minors (1904-09) ===
The 1904 season saw Harley playing left field with the Toronto baseball club of the Eastern (minor) League. On July 15 Dick became player/manager of the team after Mgr. Arthur Irwin resigned. After the '04 season, Harley continued as player/manager during the '05 season, but on August 28, 1905, resigned as manager and was given his release from the Toronto club. On August 30, 1905, Harley was acquired by the Providence Clamdiggers (also Eastern League) where he stayed through the end of the 1906 season. The 1905 Clamdiggers finished first in the Eastern League with a record of 83 wins and 47 losses. In early 1907 Harley signed with the Trenton team of the Tri-State League. He played with Trenton through August 17, 1907, requested and was granted his release at that time. In 1908 and early 1909 Harley was playing with the Louisville Colonels of the American Association. Harley was released May 19, 1909 from the Louisville team (suffering from a badly cut hand) and came back to the Phila. area playing a short time for a Reading, Pa. team from May 25, 1909, to June 4 but left the Reading team due to an unspecified illness (possibly lingering effects from the injury to his hand he sustained while playing for Louisville.) (ref. rwh220)

== Later years ==
After his baseball playing days were over, Dick coached the Blair Academy baseball team (private boarding school located in Blairstown, NJ) for the years 1910, 1911 and 1912. He coached the Georgetown University baseball team, his alma mater, for the year 1913. He signed on to manage the Penn State University baseball club for the 1915, 1916 and 1917 seasons and had a cumulative record of 44 and 19. His final coaching stint was with the University of Pittsburgh baseball club from 1920 through 1924. Harley also would coach the Villa Nova College baseball club before reporting for spring training during the years 1898, 1899, 1900 and 1903 and 1904.

Harley died on April 3, 1952, at 79 years of age at his home in Philadelphia. He was survived by three sons and two daughters. He was buried at Old Cathedral Cemetery in Philadelphia. (ref. rwh220)

== Head coaching record ==
=== Football ===
Year	Team	Overall	Conference	Standing	Bowl/playoffs
Georgetown (Independent) (1893)
1893	Georgetown	4–4			
Georgetown:		4–4			
Total:		4–4			

== See also ==
- List of Major League Baseball single-game hits leaders
