= Harry Lochhead =

American baseball player (1876–1909)

- Shortstop
- Born: March 29, 1876; Stockton, California, U.S.
- Died: August 22, 1909 (aged 33); Stockton, California, U.S.
- Batted: Right Threw: Right

MLB debut
- April 16, 1899, for the Cleveland Spiders

Last MLB appearance
- May 15, 1901, for the Philadelphia Athletics

MLB statistics
- Batting average: .231
- Home runs: 1
- Runs batted in: 45
- Stats at Baseball Reference

Teams
- Cleveland Spiders (1899); Detroit Tigers (1901); Philadelphia Athletics (1901)

Robert Henry "Harry" Lochhead (March 29, 1876 – August 22, 1909), sometimes spelled "Lockhead", was an American baseball shortstop. A native of Stockton, California, he played professional baseball from 1896 to 1903, including two years in Major League Baseball with the Cleveland Spiders in 1899 and the Detroit Tigers and Philadelphia Athletics in 1901. He compiled a .231 batting average in 158 major league games. He ranked second in the National League with 81 errors in 146 games at shortstop during the 1899 season.

== Early years ==
Lochhead was born in 1876 in Stockton, California. His father died in 1878, leaving Lochhead's mother to raise him and his three siblings. He grew up in Stockton and attended Stockton High School.

== Professional baseball ==
=== Stockton and Sacramento (1896-1900) ===
Lochhead began playing professional baseball in 1896 as a pitcher and shortstop for the Stockton team in the California League. He also played for Sacramento Gilt Edges in the Pacific Coast League from 1898 to 1900.

=== Cleveland Spiders (1899) ===
Lochhead made his major league debut as the starting shortstop for the 1899 Cleveland Spiders, widely regarded as the worst baseball team in history. The 1899 Spiders had a 20–134 record (.130 winning percentage), scoring 529 runs and allowing 1,252. Lochhead has the dubious distinction of sometimes being referred to as the worst regular player on the worst team in history. His .238 batting average was 43 points lower than the league average (.281) and among the lowest among all starters in the National League in 1899. His 81 errors was by far the highest on the Spiders, though his .909 fielding percentage was on par with other National League shortstops that year. He led the team in appearances, playing in 148 of the Spiders' 154 games. His 81 errors ranked second in the National League at any position, but he also ranked second among the league's shortstops with 493 assists, third with 319 putouts, and fourth with 54 double plays.

=== Stockton, Butte, Detroit and Philadelphia (1900–01) ===
On April 3, 1900, the Detroit Tigers purchased four former Spiders: Lochhead, Sport McAllister, Dick Harley, and Suter Sullivan. However, Lochhead did not join the Tigers in 1900, opting instead to return to California where he played for the Stockton Wasps in the California League. He sustained an ankle injury during the 1900 season that slowed him for the remainder of his career. He also played part of the 1900 season for the Butte Smoke Eaters, batting .382 in 34 at bats.

After the Tigers became a major league team in 1901, Lochhead played only one more game for the team. In four at bats, Lochhead had two hits, was hit by a pitch, and scored two runs for the Tigers, for a .500 batting average and .600 on-base percentage.

The Tigers sold Lochhead to the Philadelphia Athletics on April 29, 1901. Lochhead batted .088 in nine games for the Athletics. He also made nine errors in 37 chances at shortstop for a .757 fielding percentage. He played his last major league game on May 15, 1901.

=== Return to minors (1901-03) ===
Lochhead continued to play in the minor league until 1903 with the Syracuse team of the Eastern League (1901), the New Orleans Pelicans of the Southern Association (1901), and the Fort Worth Panthers of the Texas League (1903). He was a pitcher for Fort Worth in 1903, compiling a 16-19 record.

== Later years ==
After retiring from baseball, Lochhead lived with his mother in Stockton, California, working as an attendant at the state hospital and later as a bartender in Sacramento. By 1908, he had become ill with a liver ailment described by some sources as hepatitis and by others as cirrhosis. In August 1908, he died at age 33 at his mother's home. His death was precipitated by his having become lost in the desert with a group of friends near Bakersfield, California the previous month.
