= Emmet Heidrick =

American baseball player (1876–1916)

- Outfielder
- Born: July 9, 1876; Queenstown, Pennsylvania, U.S.
- Died: January 20, 1916 (aged 39); Clarion, Pennsylvania, U.S.
- Batted: Left Threw: Right

MLB debut
- September 14, 1898, for the Cleveland Spiders

Last MLB appearance
- October 6, 1908, for the St. Louis Browns

MLB statistics
- Batting average: .300
- Home runs: 16
- Runs batted in: 342
- Stolen bases: 186
- Stats at Baseball Reference

Teams
- Cleveland Spiders (1898); St. Louis Perfectos/Cardinals (1899–1901); St. Louis Browns (1902–1904, 1908)

R. Emmet "Snags" Heidrick (July 29, 1876 – January 20, 1916) was an American professional baseball player. He played in Major League Baseball (MLB) for the Cleveland Spiders, St. Louis Cardinals, and St. Louis Browns between 1898 and 1908, primarily as an outfielder. He was known as a good defensive player who hit for a high batting average, but he missed a great deal of playing time due to injuries.

Heidrick stood out among early baseball players because he came from a wealthy family. His father, Levi Heidrick, was a successful businessman, and his son, Gardner Heidrick, co-founded an executive search firm.

== Biography ==
Heidrick came from an affluent family. His father Levi owned a successful lumber business. Heidrick's background was even noted on an early-career scouting report about him, with the scout opining that Heidrick did not need to play baseball to earn money. He had a strong throwing arm and good defensive ability.

After spending his first major-league season with the Cleveland Spiders in 1898. Frank Robison and Stanley Robison had purchased the St. Louis Perfectos after the 1898 season but had not given up control of the Spiders. Feeling that a good team could draw better attendance in St. Louis than in Cleveland, the Robison brothers traded Heidrick and several other Spiders players to the Perfectos. The 1899 Perfectos finished in fifth place that year, while the Spiders had the worst record in baseball history, 20–134.

Early in his career, he hit for a high batting average and he was fast. Injuries usually caused him to miss at least 20 games in each season. Fans and teammates often felt that Heidrick's heart was not in baseball. Though he often had physicians who documented his injuries, he seemed to be injured more often during the hot summer months.

In 1901, Heidrick's father accidentally killed himself when he knocked over a loaded gun in his closet at home.

Before the 1902 season, Heidrick was part of a dispute that was heard before the Supreme Court of Missouri. Heidrick, Bobby Wallace and Jack Harper signed with the St. Louis Browns, but Frank Robison claimed to still have them under contract. Robison took the matter of Wallace's contract to court. The Supreme Court of Missouri ruled against Robison, and the ruling was understood to apply to the other two players as well.

After three years with the Browns, Heidrick retired in 1904 and joined the lumber business run by his family. He returned to the field with the Browns briefly in 1908. As late as 1911, he was playing for a local team in Brookville, Pennsylvania.

In 757 major-league games played, Heidrick batted .300 (914 for 3047) with 468 runs scored, 16 home runs, 342 RBI, 186 stolen bases, an on-base percentage of .333 and slugging percentage of .399 in eight seasons.

Heidrick died of influenza in 1916. His son Gardner was one of the two founders of the executive search firm Heidrick & Struggles.
