= List of Cleveland Spiders Opening Day starting pitchers =

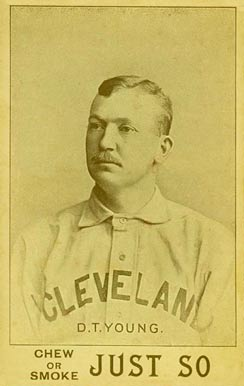
Hall of Famer Cy Young made six Opening Day starts for the Spiders.

The Cleveland Spiders were a Major League Baseball (MLB) franchise that were based in Cleveland, Ohio and played from 1887 to 1899. The team played in the American Association as the Cleveland Blues in 1887 and 1888, and in the National League as the Cleveland Spiders from 1889 to 1899. The Spiders used eight Opening Day starting pitchers in their 13 years as a Major League franchise. The first game of the new baseball season is played on Opening Day, and being named the starter that day is an honor, which is often given to the player who is expected to lead the pitching staff that season, though there are various strategic reasons why a team's best pitcher might not start on Opening Day. The Spiders had a record of 2 wins and 11 losses in their Opening Day games. They never played an Opening Day game at home.

The first game in franchise history was played on April 16, 1887 against the Cincinnati Reds at League Park in Cincinnati. George Pechiney was the team's Opening Day starting pitcher that day, against the team he played for the previous two years. The team, then known as the Blues, lost the game 16–6. The team's first game in the National League was played on April 24, 1889 against the Indianapolis Hoosiers at Seventh Street Park in Indianapolis. Jersey Bakley was the Spiders' Opening Day starting pitcher for that game, which the Spiders lost 10–3. The last Opening Day game for the Spiders was played on April 15, 1899 against the St. Louis Perfectos at Robison Field in St. Louis. Willie Sudhoff was the team's Opening Day starting pitcher for that game, which the Spiders lost 10–1.

Baseball Hall of Famer Cy Young was the Spiders' Opening Day starting pitcher six times – in 1891, 1893, 1894, 1896, 1897 and 1898. He was the only pitcher to have more than one Opening Day start for the franchise. Young, who is the Major League Baseball record holder for most career wins, is the only Opening Day starting pitcher to start a game in which they won, in both 1891 and 1893. The Spiders lost Young's other four Opening Day starts, as well as every Opening Day game started by other pitchers.

== Key ==
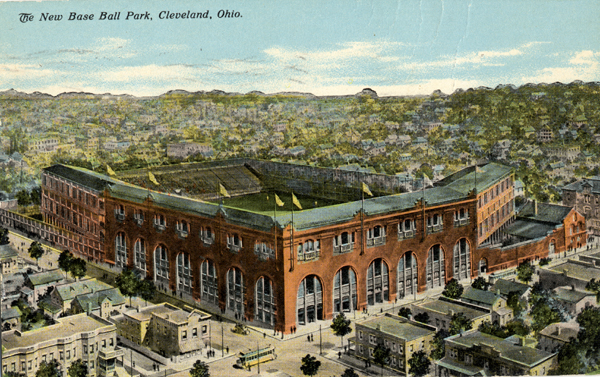
League Park, home of the Cleveland Spiders from 1891–1899

W	Win
L	Loss
T	Tie game
ND (W)	No decision by starting pitcher; Spiders won game
ND (L)	No decision by starting pitcher; Spiders lost game
(W)	Spiders won game; no information on starting pitcher's decision
(L)	Spiders lost game; no information on starting pitcher's decision
Final score	Game score with Spiders runs listed first
(No.)	Number of appearances as Opening Day starter with the Spiders

== Pitchers ==
Season	Pitcher	Decision	Final score	Opponent	Location	Ref.
1887	George Pechiney	L	6–16	Cincinnati Reds	League Park	
1888	Billy Crowell	(L)	1–10	Brooklyn Bridegrooms	Washington Park or Ridgewood Park	
1889	Jersey Bakley	(L)	3–10	Indianapolis Hoosiers	Seventh Street Park	
1890	Ed Beatin	(L)	2–3	Pittsburgh Pirates	Exposition Park	
1891	Cy Young	(W)	6–3	Cincinnati Reds	League Park	
1892	George Davies	(L)	2–5	Louisville Colonels	Eclipse Park	
1893	Cy Young (2)	(W)	7–2	Pittsburgh Pirates	Exposition Park	
1894	Cy Young (3)	(L)	3–10	Louisville Colonels	Eclipse Park	
1895	Mike Sullivan	(L)	8–10	Cincinnati Reds	League Park	
1896	Cy Young (4)	(L)	2–5	St. Louis Browns	Robison Field	
1897	Cy Young (5)	(L)	1–3	Louisville Colonels	Eclipse Park	
1898	Cy Young (6)	(L)	2–3	Cincinnati Reds	League Park	
1899	Willie Sudhoff	(L)	1–10	St. Louis Perfectos	Robison Field	
