= Frank Bates =

American baseball player

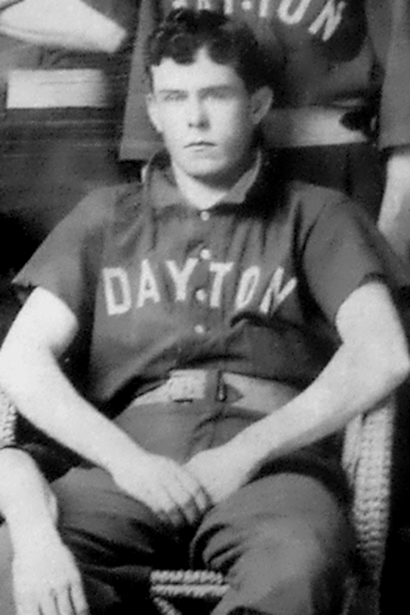
- Pitcher
- Born: September 28, 1876; Cleveland, Tennessee, US
- Batted: Unknown Threw: Right

MLB debut
- October 7, 1898, for the Cleveland Spiders

Last MLB appearance
- September 9, 1899, for the Cleveland Spiders

MLB statistics
- Win–loss record: 3–19
- Earned run average: 6.33
- Strikeouts: 18
- Stats at Baseball Reference

Teams
- Cleveland Spiders (1898); St. Louis Perfectos (1899); Cleveland Spiders (1899)

Creed Napoleon "Frank" Bates (September 28, 1876 – after 1918) was an American professional pitcher and outfielder in Major League Baseball from 1898 to 1899. He played for the Cleveland Spiders and St. Louis Perfectos. Bates was 5 feet 10 inches (1.78 m) tall and weighed 156 pounds (71 kg).

== Early career ==
Bates was born in Cleveland, Tennessee, in 1876. He started his professional baseball career in 1896 with the Columbus Babies and Mobile Blackbirds of the Southern Association. He had a combined win–loss record of 2–10 for the two clubs. The following year, he went 3–8 for the Southeastern League's Chattanooga Blues. However, in 1898, Bates started the season with the Interstate League's Dayton Old Soldiers and posted a winning record of 23–18. He then joined the major league Cleveland Spiders and went 2–1 with a 3.10 earned run average in four late-season starts.

== 1899 ==
In 1899, "syndicate baseball" was allowed in the National League, which meant that a single group could own more than one team. The Cleveland Spiders and St. Louis Perfectos were both owned by Frank and Stanley Robison, and in March 1899, Bates was "assigned" to St. Louis. He finished two games for the Perfectos early in the season, allowing one earned run in 8 2/3 innings pitched. On June 5, however, he was sent back to the Spiders, who were in last place. He made his debut for the 1899 Spiders on June 11, and, apparently "sulking" over his transfer from team to team, pitched poorly and lost the game, 10–1.

Bates lost his first four decisions with Cleveland. He then defeated the Boston Beaneaters on July 1, pitching a 17-hit complete game; that turned out to be the only time he won in 1899. The Cleveland Spiders had transferred their best players to St. Louis and were on their way to a 20–134 campaign, which set a record for the lowest winning percentage in Major League Baseball history. Bates, pitching the third-most innings for this team, went 1–18 with a 7.24 ERA, while making "a circus-like assortment of pitching mistakes."

The Cleveland Press noted in July that "although [Bates] succeeds in turning almost every game into which he participates into a howling farce, he is sent into the box in his turn, only to bring ridicule upon his unfortunate associates." The New York Times wrote that he had "very poor command of the ball." On August 17, after a game in which Bates walked nine Brooklyn Superbas batters (one with the bases loaded), the Cleveland Plain Dealer observed:

Of course, the Clevelands did not win the game, and it is hard to see when they will win a game so long as they persist in playing Bates ... He had little speed today, was quite as wild as usual, and the Brooklyns had little or no trouble in making runs and plenty of them.

Bates was released from the team in September, having lost each of his last 14 starts. He never pitched in the majors again.

== Later career ==
Bates returned to the Interstate League in 1900, and he went 6–13. In 1908, he finished his professional baseball career with the Cotton States League's Meridian Ribboners.

In September 1918, Bates was living in Cincinnati, and working as a laborer for H. E. Culberson in Mingo Junction, Ohio.
