= Chief Zimmer =

American baseball player (1860–1949)

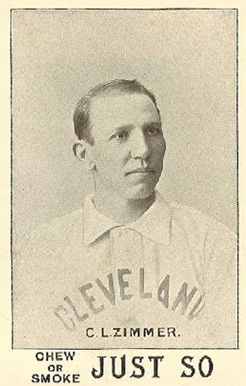
- 1893 baseball card of Zimmer
- Catcher / Manager
- Born: November 23, 1860; Marietta, Ohio, U.S.
- Died: August 22, 1949 (aged 88); Cleveland, Ohio, U.S.
- Batted: Right Threw: Right

MLB debut
- July 18, 1884, for the Detroit Wolverines

Last MLB appearance
- September 27, 1903, for the Philadelphia Phillies

MLB statistics
- Batting average: .269
- Home runs: 26
- Runs batted in: 625
- Stats at Baseball Reference

Teams
- As a player: Detroit Wolverines (1884); New York Metropolitans (1886); Cleveland Blues/Spiders (1887–1899); Louisville Colonels (1899); Pittsburgh Pirates (1900–1902); Philadelphia Phillies (1903); As a manager: Philadelphia Phillies (1903)

Charles Louis "Chief" Zimmer (November 23, 1860 – August 22, 1949) was an American professional baseball player whose playing career spanned from 1884 to 1906. He played for 19 seasons as a catcher in Major League Baseball (MLB), including 13 seasons for the Cleveland Blues/Spiders (1887–1899), three seasons for the Pittsburgh Pirates (1900–1902), and one season as the player/manager of the Philadelphia Phillies (1903).

Zimmer is regarded by some as "the finest defensive catcher of his day." He set major-league catching records for assists (188 in 1890), double plays (16 in 1895), runners caught stealing (183 in 1893), games at catcher (125 in 1890), and career fielding percentage (.943 as of 1896). As one of the game's first every-day catchers, The Sporting News in 1949 called Zimmer "baseball's original 'iron man'." Offensively, Zimmer had a career batting average of .269, but hit above .300 four times, including a career-high .340 batting average in 1895.

Zimmer was also the first president of the Players' Protective Association and a successful entrepreneur during his playing days, including operation of a wholesale and retail cigar business that he promoted while on the road. His most famous business venture, however, was "Zimmer's Baseball Game", a mechanical baseball parlor game that he invented in 1891 and became popular in the early to middle 1890s.

== Early years ==
Zimmer was born in Marietta, Ohio, in 1860. As a young man, he worked as an apprentice in a cabinetmaker's shop.

He began his professional baseball career at age 23 in 1884 playing in the Ohio State League for teams from Ironton and Portsmouth, Ohio. He appeared in eight games in the Major Leagues for the Detroit Wolverines in 1884. After being released by the Tigers, Zimmer did not play professional baseball in 1885. He played for Poughkeepsie of the Hudson River League in 1886, compiling a .409 batting average, and for the Rochester Maroons of the International Association in 1887, batting .331.

Zimmer acquired the nickname "Chief" during the 1886 season while playing as the captain of the Poughkeepsie team. Zimmer was not of American Indian descent and explained the genesis for the nickname as follows: "Since we were fleet of foot, we were called the Indians. As I was the head man of the Indians, somebody began to call me 'Chief.' It stuck."

== Major league baseball career ==
=== Finest defensive catcher of his day ===
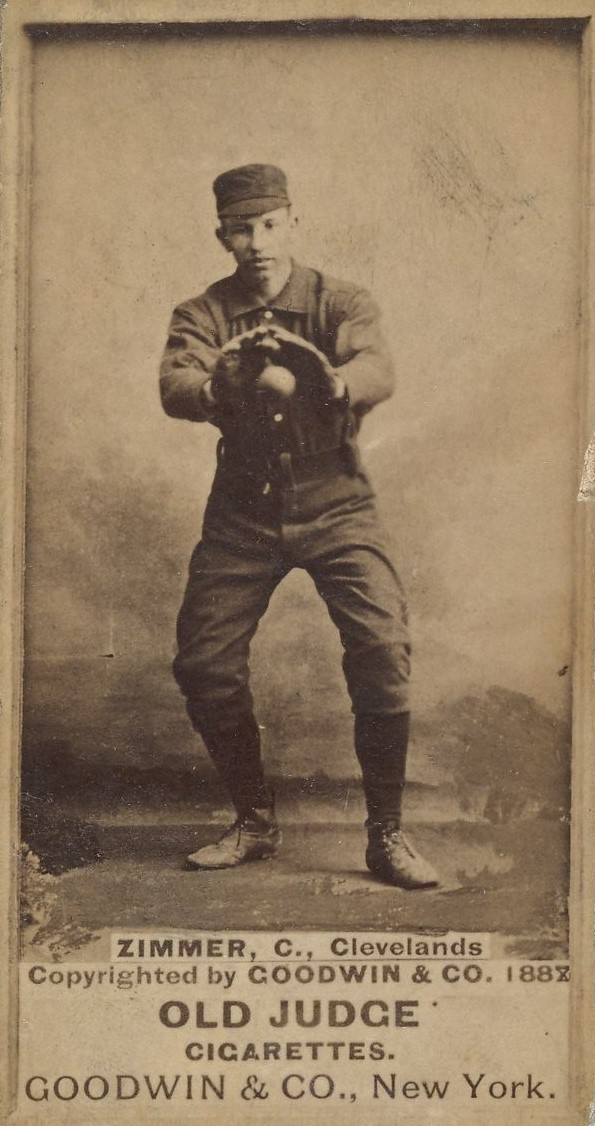
Zimmer catching on an 1887 baseball card.

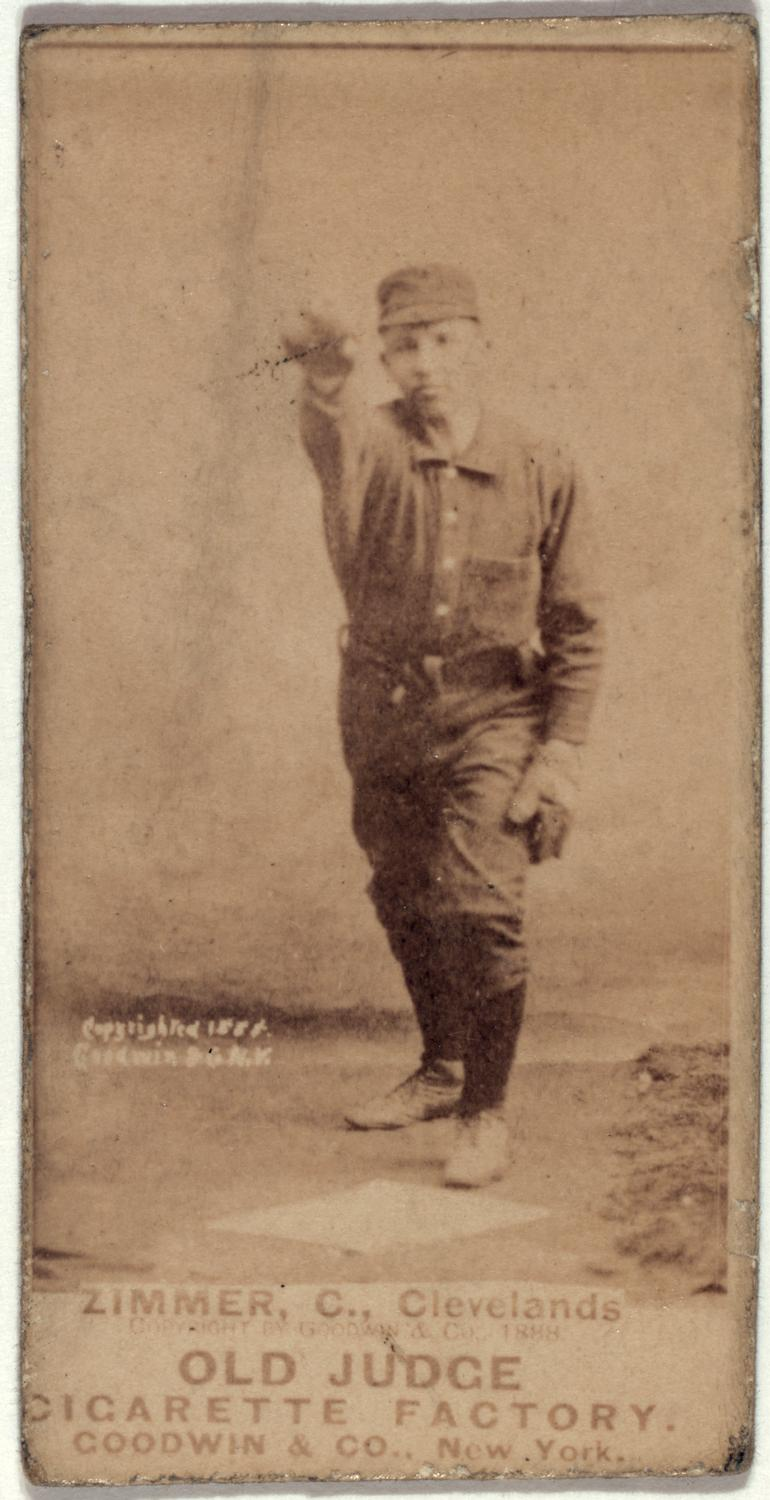
Zimmer throwing on an 1887 baseball card.

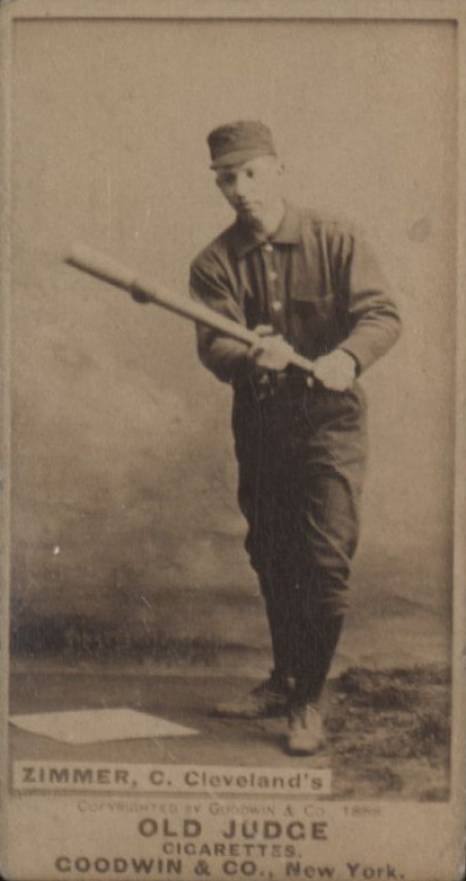
Zimmer batting on an 1887 baseball card.

Zimmer is regarded by some as "the finest defensive catcher of his day." Baseball historian Bill James picked Zimmer as the catcher both for his 1890s Gold Glove team and his 1890s All-Star team, and as the 62nd best catcher of all time. From 1889 to 1900, Zimmer was regularly among his league's leaders in putouts, assists, double plays, fielding percentage and games played at catcher. He set multiple Major League fielding records during his career, including the following:

- Caught stealing. In 1893, Zimmer caught 183 base runners trying to steal a base, a figure that established a Major League record that stood until 1895. He led the majors in the category for the second consecutive season with 170 in 1894 and held the career record for most runners caught stealing until 1898. Zimmer secured his reputation for catching base runners when he caught the great base stealer "Sliding Billy" Hamilton twice in one game. Sporting Life at the time reported: "Bennett and Zimmer are the only League catchers who have managed to catch Hamilton at second. Zimmer is also the only catcher who has nailed Hamilton twice in one game."
- Games at catcher. Zimmer appeared in 125 games at catcher in 1890, a figure that stood until 1895 as the Major League record for most games played at the position in a single season. He also set a Major League record for consecutive games at catcher with 111 during the 1890 season, more than doubling the prior record. He led the National League in games caught for the second consecutive season in 1891 with 116 and ranked second in the league with 111 games at catcher in 1892. The Sporting News in 1949 called Zimmer "baseball's original 'iron man'." Prior to Zimmer, catchers were typically paired with specific pitchers and did not catch every day. Zimmer became one of the Major Leagues' first every-day catchers.
- Assists. Zimmer's 188 assists as a catcher in 1890 stood as the Major League record until 1912, and he led the majors for a second consecutive season with 181 in 1891.
- Double plays. Zimmer's 16 doubles plays as a catcher in 1895 broke the Major League record, and in 1900 he also broke Charlie Bennett's Major League record for most career double plays as a catcher.
- Fielding percentage. By 1896, Zimmer also had the highest career fielding percentage (.943) ever compiled by a Major League catcher.

Zimmer is also credited with being the first catcher, in 1887, to play from a squatting position directly behind the plate on every play. In prior years, catchers had played further behind the plate often standing, particularly with runners on base. During Zimmer's time, catchers' gloves had not evolved and did not provide the protection of a modern catcher's mitt. Interviewed in 1949, Zimmer indicated that the catcher's glove in the 1890s was similar to an outfielders glove, and he would occasionally pad it with a piece of beefsteak to further protect his hands from injury. In 1892, when asked how he kept his hands healthy so as to be able to catch in so many games, Zimmer also said he received regular hand massages: "He replied that he made it a practice to visit a massage establishment whenever his hands gave him the slightest cause for trouble. He argues that by the systematic rubbing of the joints all swellings and soreness can be remedied instantly."

=== Cleveland Blues/Spiders ===
After brief stints with the Detroit Wolverines (eight games in 1884) and New York Metropolitans (six games in 1886), Zimmer joined the Cleveland Blues in 1887. He remained in Cleveland for 13 seasons from 1887 through 1899.

From 1890 to 1898, Zimmer was Cy Young's catcher during Young's formative and most dominant years as a pitcher, and the two remained close friends for 60 years. Young's biographer, Reed Browing, noted that Young always credited Zimmer for his contributions:

As Young's career progressed, no Major League pitcher was more outspoken than he in expressing how much a fine catcher enhanced his performance on the mound. Young and Zimmer quickly became the most famous battery of the 1890s.

In 1890, Cleveland finished in seventh place with a 44–88 record; Young, in his rookie season, was 9–7. From the low point in 1890, Zimmer, the club and Young all improved remarkably. In 1891, Zimmer had a career-high 69 RBIs with a 1.6 Wins Above Replacement (WAR) rating. He caught 116 games in 1891, but underwent knee surgery after the season was over.

The following year, in 1892, Zimmer compiled a career-high 3.2 WAR rating and led the 1892 Cleveland Spiders to a franchise best record of 93–56 (.624), good for second place in the National League. The 1892 season was also a breakout year for Young who compiled a 36–12 record with a 1.93 earned run average (ERA). After the 1892 season, Sporting Life described Zimmer as "a temperate, faithful and conscientious player" who was "a great local favorite" and said this about his ability to deter stolen bases: "His throwing is a holy terror to would-be base stealers, and very few men steal second off him when anything but a slow pitcher is in the box."

In 1893, the distance between the pitcher and home plate was extended by nine feet, resulting in a dramatic increase in batting averages. The rule change helped Zimmer statistically, as he compiled a .308 batting average, the first of four .300 seasons. However, Zimmer bemoaned the rule change's effect on pitchers: "They are making the pitcher a mere automaton. By and by they will make him stand on a cake of ice and pitch. Say what you will, the pitcher is the central figure in the game. People pay their money to see base ball, and the more scientific it is the better. When you put a pitcher out of sight and make a toy of him you are working squarely against the interests of the game, in my opinion."

In July 1893, he suffered a broken shoulder bone and was able to play only 56 games behind the plate. The injury was sustained in a collision with Tommy Tucker. Cleveland newspapers protested and claimed that Tucker was a player with a reputation as a habitual dirty player who had acted intentionally to injure Zimmer. Despite the severity of the injury, the popular Zimmer returned to the lineup in September 1893 after seven weeks' absence, prompting the Sporting Life to predict: "Zimmer can play in Cleveland as long as he pleases."

In 1894, Zimmer became one of the first players to get six hits in a single game, doing so off Win Mercer.

In 1895, Zimmer had a career-high .340 batting average, as his batting and handling of Young (who compiled a 35–10 record) helped lead the 1895 Cleveland Spiders to the Temple Cup, a championship cup that was awarded to the winner of a best-of-seven, post-season championship series in the National League. Zimmer was the batting hero of the 1895 Temple Cup, hitting a two-run home run to win the decisive game. His cup-winning home run was memorialized in a poem that included the following lines:

The score was tied, one man was out,
Tebeau was safe on third;
As Zimmer grasped his mighty bat,
Such cheering ne'er was heard.
He swiftly swung his willow,
The ball had met its fate;
And a roar went up that reached the clouds,
Tebeau had crossed the plate.

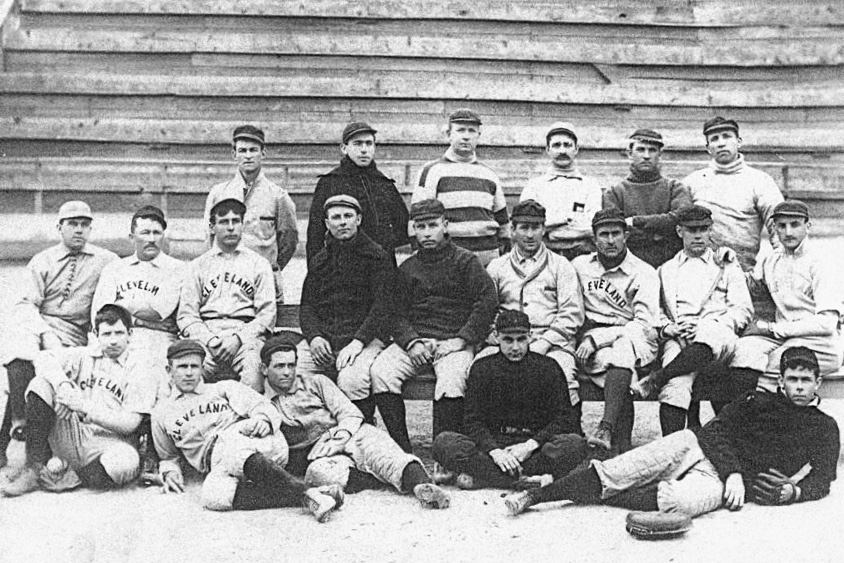
Zimmer (far right on the top row) with the 1898 Cleveland Spiders.

In late March 1896, Zimmer left the Spiders' spring training camp in a contract dispute, and one week later reportedly signed a contract providing for him to be paid the maximum salary of $2,400 plus an $800 signing bonus. The Sporting Life reported: "If there is one player whose services Mr. Robison(Cleveland owner Frank Robison) cannot afford to lose, it is Charley Zimmer. In spring, summer and fall or any old time at all chief is in condition." On September 24, 1896, two masked men armed with revolvers woke Zimmer and his wife at their home at 43 Steinway Street in Cleveland. The intruders robbed Zimmer of his $60 gold watch and $20 in cash.

In 1897, at age 36, Zimmer continued to impress. He compiled a .316 batting average and a 1.9 WAR rating while helping Young win 20 games for the seventh consecutive season.

After the 1898 season, Young left the Spiders, and Zimmer, at age 38, was released by the team in early June 1899, despite having compiled a .342 batting average in 20 games. Without Young or Zimmer, the 1899 Cleveland Spiders compiled a 20-134 (.130) record—the worst record in Major League history.

=== Louisville and Pittsburgh ===
In June 1899, Zimmer was signed as a free agent by the Louisville Colonels. He appeared in 75 games for Louisville in 1899, compiling a .298 batting average. For the second time in his career, Zimmer was responsible for mentoring a future Hall of Fame pitcher in his rookie season. At Louisville, the rookie pitcher was Rube Waddell.

In December 1899, Zimmer was part of a blockbuster trade with the Pittsburgh Pirates. In addition to Zimmer, the Colonels sent three future Hall of Famers (Waddell, Honus Wagner and Fred Clarke) to the Pirates in exchange for Jack Chesbro, three other players, and $25,000.

During the 1900 season, Zimmer was the oldest player in the Major Leagues at age 39. However, he continued to play well. Aside from a .295 batting average, Zimmer caught 82 games, led the National League with 318 putouts and totaled 89 runners caught stealing. Moreover, under Zimmer's tutelage, Rube Waddell in his first season as a regular starter, led the National League with a 2.37 ERA.

The following year, Zimmer remained the oldest player in the Major Leagues at age 40. He caught 69 games for the 1901 Pirates team that won the National League pennant with a 90–49 record. During the 1901 season, Zimmer caught for his third Hall of Fame pitcher, Jack Chesbro.

In 1902, at age 41, Zimmer caught 41 games, compiled a .268 batting average, and maintained a respectable 1.1 WAR rating. The Pirates won the pennant for the second consecutive year with a 103–36 record.

=== Philadelphia Phillies ===
In early 1903, the Philadelphia Phillies were sold, and the new owners, with the assistance of Pittsburgh owner Barney Dreyfuss, persuaded Zimmer to become the Phillies' manager. Zimmer agreed and also appeared in 35 games as the team's catcher. In May 1903, the Sporting Life newspaper wrote that Zimmer was still a solid performer behind the plate: "The Phillies' pitchers do their best work and the team is strongest when the veteran Zimmer is in the game. A wink should be as good as a kick, Chief." Zimmer appeared in his final Major League game as a player at age 42 on September 27, 1903.

In his role as manager, Zimmer took over a team that had finished in seventh place in 1902. By the first of June 1903, the Phillies were struggling with an 11–26 record. Zimmer at that time acknowledged that the "task of managing a team that does not stand so well up in the race is not the most pleasant one in the world", but he insisted that he was not discouraged and noted that the greater satisfaction comes not from taking charge of a first-class team and keeping it going, but "to take hold of a team that is down in the race and bring it up to a high standard." The Phillies did improve late in the season, compiling a 16–13 record in their last 29 games. However, with a seventh-place finish, the 1903 season was Zimmer's only one as a Major League manager. In fairness to Zimmer, the Phillies simply lacked the talent to compete with the best teams in the National League, had finished in seventh place in 1902 under Bill Shettsline, and dropped to eighth place in 1904 under Hugh Duffy.

=== Table games, cigars and groceries ===
During his baseball career, Zimmer was among the highest paid players in the game. He invested his money wisely and was alert for investment opportunities. By 1900, his business interests included "upward of $35,000 invested in the grocery business and real estate in Cleveland." He also owned a restaurant in Cleveland and used his wood-working skills to make furniture in the off-season.

The business opportunity that drew the most attention was "Zimmer's Base Ball Game", a mechanical baseball table game developed by Zimmer in 1891. In November 1891, The Sporting Life reported on Zimmer's innovation on its front page:

Zimmer Comes to the Front With an Indoor Game
Charley Zimmer, the good-natured and gentlemanly catcher of the Cleveland Club has invented and patented an indoor game of base ball that ought to make him a little fortune. It promises to become one of the greatest toys of the age. A regular game can be played. The ball is pitched from an ingenious device and goes straight over the plate. If a hit isn't made or the ball struck at all the 'catcher' gets it. All the 'players' are in position, and there are regular catches in the outfield and pick-ups in the infield. The bat is a curious contrivance, and it takes good judgment to operate it. A fast or slow ball can be pitched, and the batter is liable to be 'fooled' by changes of pace. Nothing like it was ever seen before in toy games. The invention is to be shown in Hudson's window after Thanksgiving, and will surely attract great attention.

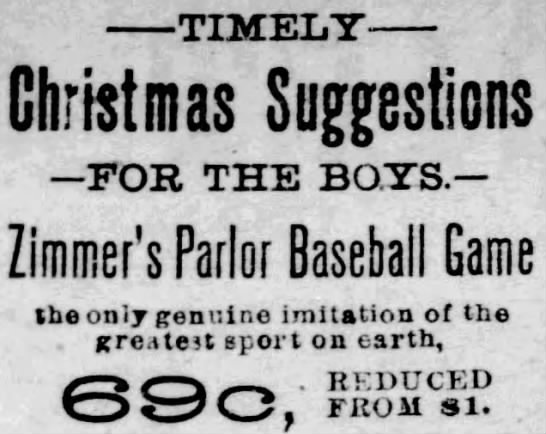
A December 1893 advertisement for Zimmer's baseball game.

The game featured a painted ball field with children peeking over the one-and-a-half inch outfield wall as well as lithographed images of Zimmer and 18 other players, including 11 Hall of Famers. The game was played with "a pool cue-type spring loaded device" and "metal clasps located at the nine positions to catch the ball."

In January 1892, Zimmer was offered "a big amount of money" for his interest in the game, and it was estimated "by judicious business management" that 100,000 copies of the game could be sold. In October 1892, Zimmer stated that he expected to sell "a great many of his parlor baseball inventions" over the winter and noted that one New York firm had purchased 600 from him. Two years later, he reported that he had a large number of orders for the game and that he had made over $4,000 from the game over the past three years.

Unlike many baseball players of his era, Zimmer used neither liquor nor tobacco. In 1890, the Sporting Life reported that there were likely no more than a half a dozen professional baseball players who could match Zimmer's claim: "He has never taken a drink of any kind of intoxicating liquor in his life, and has never used tobacco in any shape." Zimmer later attributed his long playing career (and long life) to the fact that he never didn't smoke, didn't chew, and didn't drink. Despite his personal aversion to tobacco, Zimmer in the 1890s was successful in operating a wholesale and retail cigar business in Cleveland. In 1898, as he traveled with the Cleveland team, he carried a valise with samples of the cigars that he sold. Commenting on Zimmer's business ingenuity in promoting his cigar business while traveling at the expense of the Cleveland club, the Sporting Life wrote: "With such an instinct for taking advantage of circumstances Zimmer is certain to be prosperous."

=== Players' Protective Association ===
During the summer of 1900, the Players' Protective Association, predecessor to the Major League Baseball Players Association, was formed to represent the interest of professional baseball players. Zimmer was elected as the organization's first president with Hughie Jennings secretary. During Zimmer's tenure as president, the organization successfully negotiated for a new rule providing that a player could not be traded or sold without his consent. The Sporting Life later wrote that Zimmer was the "only man who ever showed marked ability" as president of the Association.

The consent rule that Zimmer secured was later rescinded, and the Association's reputation declined. In August 1902, Zimmer, having stepped down from the Association's leadership, commented on the reasons for the decline:

There is nothing solid left in the Players' Protective Association. There has been no activity on the part of the present officials, and there will be none. The organization has been allowed to die because the members have seen nothing in it to interest them. Some are not pleased with the officers; others object to the paying of dues, while others still believe that they can do better by themselves than by acting in concert with all the other players; and so the Players' Protective Association gradually is being allowed to die out. One hears but little of it now, and in a year from now will hear less. It would have been a good thing for the players if they had been true to its principles and the officials had been active in carrying out all its aims and laws. However, there was failure on all sides, and the result is that the organization gradually is fading out of existence.

== Umpiring and comeback as a player ==
During the 1904 and 1905 seasons, Zimmer worked as an umpire: first in the National League where he umpired 151 games in 1904, and then in the Eastern League (a minor league that later became the International League) in 1905.

The following year, he staged a comeback as a player at age 45. In February 1906, he was hired as the player/manager for the Little Rock Travelers in the Southern Association. Even at age 45, Zimmer still displayed superior arm strength. After a Little Rock victory in May 1906, the Sporting Life newspaper reported: "Little Rock showed wonderful improvement and defeated Birmingham in a well-played game. The feature was the throwing of Zimmer to second." He appeared in 41 games as a player for Little Rock. His Little Rock team finished in last place with a 40–98 record.

Zimmer was among a number of Cleveland players who played in an Old-Timers' Day in July 1921; Zimmer, aged 60, caught for his former battery-mate Cy Young, aged 55.

== Family and later years ==
Zimmer was married and had three daughters. During his playing career, he made furniture as a hobby during the off-season and filled his home in Cleveland with his handiwork. After retiring from baseball, Zimmer lived in Cleveland for the remainder of his life. He died there at age 88 in 1949. He was buried at Crown Hill Cemetery in Twinsburg, Ohio.

== See also ==
- List of Major League Baseball single-game hits leaders
- List of Major League Baseball player-managers
