= Harry Blake =

American baseball player (1874–1919)

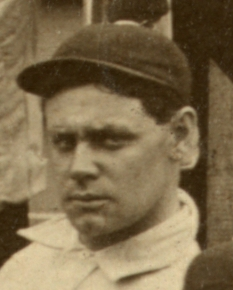
- Outfielder
- Born: June 16, 1874; Portsmouth, Ohio, U.S.
- Died: October 14, 1919 (aged 45); Chicago, Illinois, U.S.
- Batted: Right Threw: Right

MLB debut
- July 7, 1894, for the Cleveland Spiders

Last MLB appearance
- October 9, 1899, for the St. Louis Perfectos

MLB statistics
- Batting average: .252
- Home runs: 8
- Runs batted in: 253
- Stats at Baseball Reference

Teams
- Cleveland Spiders (1894–1898); St. Louis Perfectos (1899)

Harry Cooper Blake (June 16, 1874 – October 14, 1919), sometimes known by the nickname "Dude", was an American outfielder in Major League Baseball who played in the late 19th century. He played for the Cleveland Spiders (1894–1898) and for the St. Louis Perfectos in 1899.

== Early life ==
Blake was born in Portsmouth, Ohio. His father owned a butcher shop in Portsmouth, and Blake returned to work there even during his major-league offseasons.

== Career ==
Blake debuted in the major leagues in 1894, becoming the first major league player from Portsmouth. He had been playing for the Atlanta Atlantas of the Southern League when the Cleveland Spiders sent injured outfielder Jimmy McAleer to find some promising players. Blake and McAleer had several similarities – both were Ohio natives and light-hitting outfielders with strong defensive skills – and Blake was signed by the Spiders.

He was a member of the Cleveland team that defeated the Baltimore Orioles four games to one to win the 1895 Temple Cup. In May 1896, the Spiders had farmed Blake out to a team in Fort Wayne, Indiana. While he was there, he married Viola Barber. Blake returned to the Spiders shortly after his wedding. The next year, he again split the season between the Spiders and a farm team. In 1898, he finished fourth in the league in sacrifice hits with 23.

The owners of the Spiders, brothers Frank Robison and Stanley Robison, purchased another team, the St. Louis Perfectos, while maintaining their ownership of the Spiders. The Robison brothers sent most of the Spiders players to the Perfectos because they felt the team would draw better crowds in St. Louis. The 1899 Perfectos finished 84–67 (fifth place), while the Spiders had a disastrous 20–134 record and folded after the season.

Trying to improve his hitting, Blake had given up cigarette smoking when a teammate suggested that it might improve his ability to see the baseball; his hitting did not get better. After the 1899 season, Blake returned to the minor leagues as a player for about a decade. This time included a brief stint as a player-manager for the Houston Buffaloes of the Texas League in 1908.

== Death ==
Blake was in a Chicago rooming-house on October 14, 1919, when a fire broke out. Blake died when he was unable to escape from the building.
