= George Pechiney =

American baseball player (1861–1943)

- Pitcher
- Born: September 20, 1861; Cincinnati, Ohio, U.S.
- Died: July 14, 1943 (aged 81); Cincinnati, Ohio, U.S.
- Batted: Right Threw: Right

MLB debut
- August 4, 1885, for the Cincinnati Red Stockings

Last MLB appearance
- June 24, 1887, for the Cleveland Blues

MLB statistics
- Win–loss record: 23–34
- Strikeouts: 183
- Earned run average: 4.23
- Stats at Baseball Reference

Teams
- Cincinnati Red Stockings (1885–1886); Cleveland Blues (1887)

George Adolphe Pechiney (September 20, 1861 – July 14, 1943) was an American Major League Baseball pitcher from 1885–1887. He played for the Cleveland Blues and Cincinnati Red Stockings in the American Association

Pechiney was born in Cincinnati. He began the 1885 season with the Chattanooga Lookouts of the Southern League. He also played for the Columbus Stars of the Southern League in 1885 before joining the Major Leagues with the Cincinnati Red Stockings of the American Association later that year. He made his Major League debut for the Red Stockings on August 4, 1885. With the Red Stockings in 1885, Pechiney pitched in 11 games, starting and completing all of them, with a win–loss record of 7–4, a 2.02 earned run average and 49 strikeouts in 98 innings pitched. His winning percentage of .636 ranked 4th in the American Association behind just Bob Caruthers, Dave Foutz and Bobby Mathews.

In 1886, Pechiney pitched for the Red Stockings once again. He started 40 games, completing 35. In 300 1/3 innings pitched he posted a win–loss record of 15–21, a 4.14 earned run average and 110 strikeouts. His 2 shutouts ranked in the top 10 among American Association pitchers, as did his 21 losses, 133 walks, 152 earned runs surrenders and 14 hit batsmen. Pechiney also played in 4 games in the outfield for Cincinnati in 1886, including a game on September 12 which he started but moved to center field after three innings because he was pitching wildly. On April 27, 1886, Pechiney pitched a complete game despite giving up 20 runs in a 20–3 loss to the St. Louis Browns.

In 1887, Pechiney moved to the newly formed Cleveland Blues of the American Association. On April 16, 1887, he was the Blues' Opening Day starting pitcher for the first season in the team's history, pitching against his former Cincinnati team. The Blues lost the game by a score of 16–6. For the season, Pechiney started 10 games for the Blues, completing all of them. He had a win–loss record of 1–9, with a 7.12 earned run average and 24 strikeouts in 86 innings. He pitched his final game for the Blues, and in the Major Leagues on June 24, 1887. In 1888 he pitched in the minor leagues once again for the Canton Nadjys of the Tri-State League.

On June 12, 1925, Pechiney appeared at the Golden Jubilee celebration of Redland Field, along with other former Reds and Red Stockings players. Pechiney died at the age of 81 in Cincinnati and is buried at Spring Grove Cemetery in Cincinnati.
