= Jim Duncan (baseball) =

American baseball player (1871–1901)

- Catcher / First baseman
- Born: July 1, 1871; Saltsburg, Pennsylvania, U.S.
- Died: October 16, 1901 (aged 30); Foxburg, Pennsylvania, U.S.
- Batted: Right Threw: Right

MLB debut
- July 18, 1899, for the Washington Senators

Last MLB appearance
- October 15, 1899, for the Cleveland Spiders

MLB statistics
- Batting average: .230
- Home runs: 2
- Runs batted in: 14
- Stats at Baseball Reference

Teams
- Washington Senators (1899); Cleveland Spiders (1899)

James William Duncan (July 1, 1871 – October 16, 1901) was an American Major League Baseball player.

== Biography ==
He was born on July 1, 1871, in Saltsburg, Pennsylvania.

Duncan played baseball in the minor leagues from 1895 to 1899. He was picked up by the National League's Washington Senators in July 1899; but after batting just .234 in 14 games, he was released. He then played the rest of the season for the worst major league team in history, the 1899 Cleveland Spiders. He had a .229 average in 105 at-bats. Duncan never played again after the 1899 season ended.

Two years later at the age of 30, Duncan drowned during a fishing trip on October 16, 1901, in Foxburg, Pennsylvania. According to a newspaper report, "In company with two friends, he went out in a row boat to fish, taking a quantity of dynamite to kill the fish. It is supposed that the boat was overturned by the explosion of the dynamite. Nothing was heard of the party for a few days when the bodies were found." He was buried in Grove Hill Cemetery in Oil City, Pennsylvania.

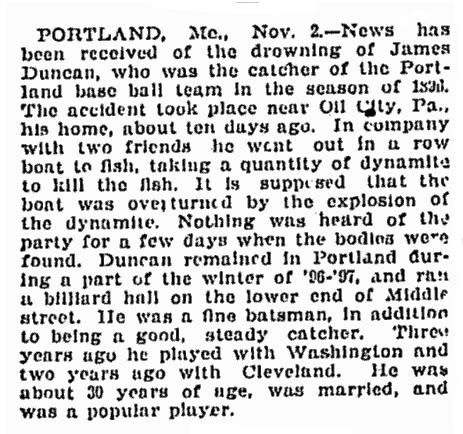
Obituary in the Lewiston Evening Journal
