= Highball Wilson =

American baseball player (1878–1934)

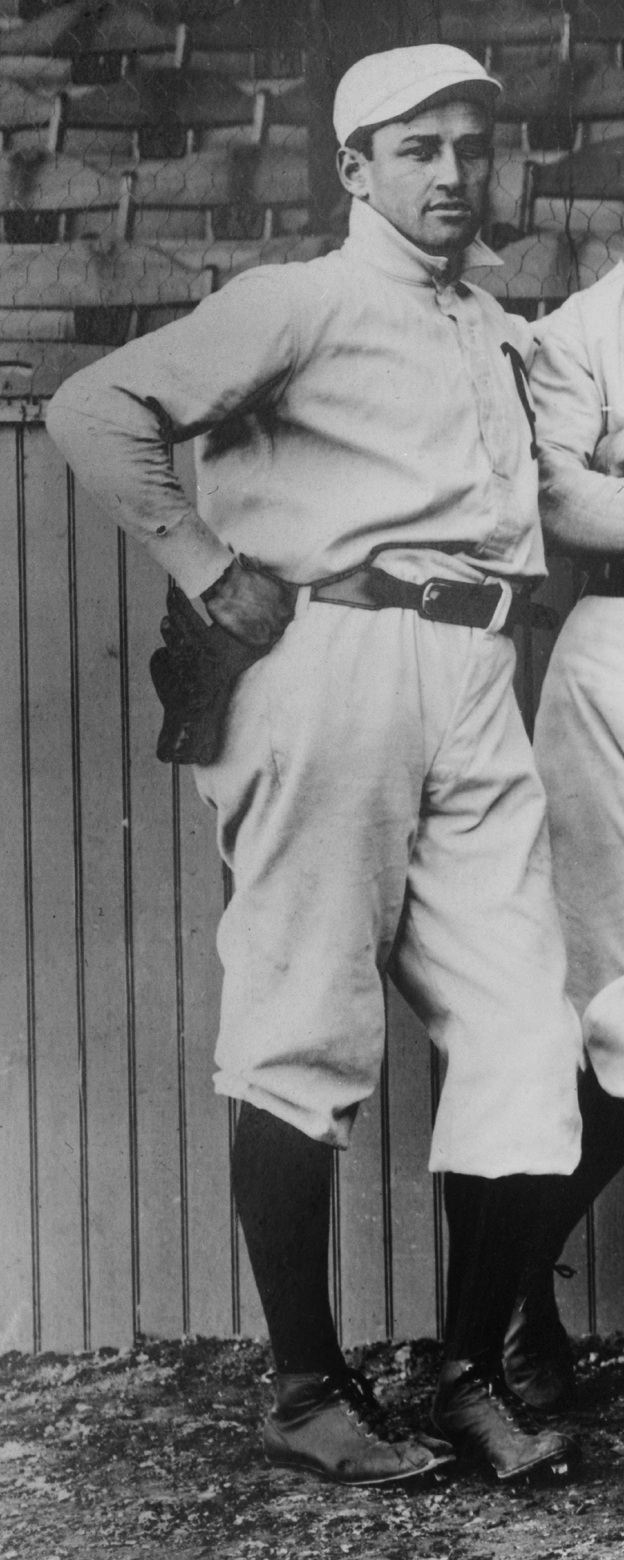
- Pitcher
- Born: August 9, 1878; Philadelphia, Pennsylvania, U.S.
- Died: October 16, 1934 (aged 56); Havre De Grace, Maryland, U.S.
- Batted: Unknown Threw: Right

MLB debut
- September 13, 1899, for the Cleveland Spiders

Last MLB appearance
- May 17, 1904, for the Washington Senators

MLB statistics
- Win–loss record: 14–27
- Earned run average: 3.29
- Strikeouts: 86
- Stats at Baseball Reference

Teams
- Cleveland Spiders (1899); Philadelphia Athletics (1902); Washington Senators (1903–1904)

Howard Paul "Highball" Wilson (August 9, 1878 – October 16, 1934) was an American professional baseball pitcher. He played all or parts of four seasons in Major League Baseball, including a stint on the infamous 1899 Cleveland Spiders.

Wilson made just one appearance for the Spiders, pitching a complete game and losing. He spent the 1900 and 1901 seasons with the Norwich Witches of the Connecticut State League, then resurfaced with the Philadelphia Athletics in 1902. During his brief stint in the A's rotation, he compiled a 7–5 record, helping the team to the American League pennant.

In 1903, he pitched for the Washington Senators, posting a 3.31 ERA but losing 18 games for a bad team. His career ended the following season.
