= Charlie Knepper =

American baseball player (1871–1946)

- Pitcher
- Born: February 18, 1871; Anderson, Indiana, U.S.
- Died: February 6, 1946 (aged 74); Muncie, Indiana, U.S.
- Batted: Right Threw: Right

MLB debut
- May 26, 1899, for the Cleveland Spiders

Last MLB appearance
- September 26, 1899, for the Cleveland Spiders

MLB statistics
- Win–loss record: 4–22
- Earned run average: 5.78
- Strikeouts: 43
- Stats at Baseball Reference

Teams
- Cleveland Spiders (1899)

Charles Knepper (February 18, 1871 – February 6, 1946) was an American professional baseball player who played as a pitcher in Major League Baseball. He threw and batted right-handed.

Knepper spent just one season in the majors, pitching for the 1899 Cleveland Spiders, a notoriously futile team that set a major league record by losing 134 games. Knepper was one of that team's primary starting pitchers, and he tied Jim Hughey for the team lead with four wins. He also ranked among the National League's leaders in several undesirable pitching categories, including home runs allowed (second, with 11), losses (fourth, with 22), earned runs allowed (seventh, with 141), and wild pitches (tenth, with eight).

Knepper was notoriously slow afoot. During a game on June 24, 1899, he hit a double, and the next day The Plain Dealer's game recap stated that "a hay wagon drawn by lame horses could have reached third, but Knepper is no hay wagon and had no lame horses to assist him".
