= Harry Colliflower =

American baseball player (1869–1961)

- Pitcher
- Born: March 11, 1869; Petersville, Maryland, U.S.
- Died: August 14, 1961 (aged 92); Washington, D.C., U.S.
- Batted: Left Threw: Left

MLB debut
- July 21, 1899, for the Cleveland Spiders

Last MLB appearance
- October 12, 1899, for the Cleveland Spiders

MLB statistics
- Win–loss record: 1–11
- Earned run average: 8.17
- Strikeouts: 8
- Stats at Baseball Reference

Teams
- Cleveland Spiders (1899)

James Harry Colliflower (March 11, 1869 – August 14, 1961), nicknamed "Collie", was an American Major League Baseball player during the 1899 season. As a 30-year-old rookie southpaw pitcher for the Cleveland Spiders, Colliflower won his debut game on July 21 giving up only 3 runs on 6 hits in a 5–3 victory against his hometown Washington Senators in the first half of a double header. Colliflower then lost his next 11 decisions, compiling an 8.17 earned run average, and a .303 batting average as a substitute outfielder.

In 1905, he coached Georgetown University's baseball team before becoming a minor league umpire for a couple of seasons. He umpired in the American League during the 1910 season. Colliflower umpired in the Southern League in 1911, and the Departmental League in Washington D.C. in 1912. After retiring from umpiring Colliflower worked as a clerk for his nephew's fuel and oil company.

== Family ==
Colliflower's nephew, James E. Colliflower, earned a bachelor's degree and three law degrees from Georgetown. He is enshrined in the Georgetown Athletics Hall of Fame as a coach of the varsity men's basketball squad from 1911 to 1914 and 1921–1922. James' brother George was also a college basketball coach, for George Washington University.
