= Kid Carsey =

American baseball player (1870–1960)

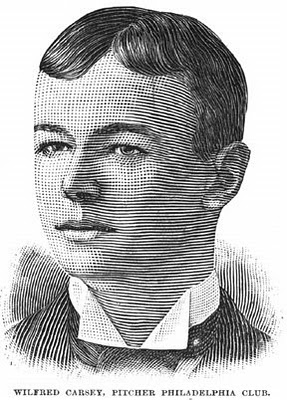
- Pitcher
- Born: October 22, 1870; New York City, New York, U.S.
- Died: March 29, 1960 (aged 89); Miami, Florida, U.S.
- Batted: Left Threw: Right

MLB debut
- April 8, 1891, for the Washington Statesmen

Last MLB appearance
- July 20, 1901, for the Brooklyn Superbas

MLB statistics
- Win–loss record: 116–138
- Earned run average: 4.95
- Strikeouts: 484
- Stats at Baseball Reference

Teams
- Washington Statesmen (1891); Philadelphia Phillies (1892–1897); St. Louis Browns (1897–1898); Cleveland Spiders (1899); Washington Senators (1899); New York Giants (1899); Brooklyn Superbas (1901)

Wilfred "Kid" Carsey (October 22, 1870 – March 29, 1960) was an American professional baseball player who was a pitcher in the Major Leagues from 1891 to 1901. He played for the Washington Statesmen, Philadelphia Phillies, St. Louis Cardinals, Washington Senators, New York Giants and Brooklyn Superbas. Carsey's pitching style was known mostly for his slow curveball and unconventional delivery, which involved snapping his wrist with little arm motion.

== Early life and career ==
Carsey's father, William, was a self-professed labor leader who was allied with the Tammany Hall political machine in New York.

Carsey began playing baseball in Harlem as a teenager, pitching on an amateur team known as the Eccentrics with his father as catcher. He gained a nickname, "the Kid", which carried with him when he attracted the attention of professional clubs and began playing in the Atlantic Association in 1889.

== Professional career ==
Carsey debuted with the Washington Statesmen of the American Association in 1891, leading that league in losses, hits, earned runs allowed, and wild pitches. From 1892 to mid-1897, he played for the Philadelphia Phillies and compiled a 94–71 record.

Carsey was known as a colorful character during his playing career, such as when he got into a fistfight with his manager while playing in the California League in 1890. He also sat out part of the 1897 and 1898 National League seasons because of a dispute with St. Louis Browns owner Chris von der Ahe.

Carsey began 1899 with a holdout against a legendarily inept Cleveland Spiders club, eventually appearing in 10 games for that franchise. He then spent brief stints that year with the Washington Senators and New York Giants. He finished the year in the minor leagues, with the Anaconda Serpents in the Montana State League. After being released from the Serpents in September, Carsey assaulted club manager Arthur Clarkson, injured his right hand, and was arrested.

Carsey made a brief comeback with the Brooklyn Superbas in 1901 before retiring.

== Post-playing career and personal life ==
Carsey fathered a son, William, out of wedlock in 1893. Kid's grandson, John, became a longtime producer of NBC television's Tonight Show and married fellow producer Marcy Carsey.

After his retirement, Carsey became a semi-pro player, manager, umpire, and baseball promoter. In 1911, he attempted to establish a club in Washington for the failed United States Baseball League.

Carsey attracted attention in 1913 when he promoted an exhibition game in Washington's Union League Park between an amateur men's club and a women's club, the Chicago Bloomers. When it was discovered that Carsey had actually hired men to play in wigs as the Bloomers, the crowd of 3,250 spectators rioted and demanded their money back; he fled town with the game's proceeds—about $700. The manager of the real Bloomers club traveled from Elmira, New York to Washington in search of Carsey and attempted to press charges for fraudulently using the club's name.

Little is known about Carsey's later years, though he was spotted in 1951 selling concessions at the Brooklyn Dodgers' spring training camp in Vero Beach, Florida.

Carsey died of pneumonia in Miami, Florida, on March 29, 1960.

== See also ==
- List of Major League Baseball career hit batsmen leaders
