= Harry Maupin =

American baseball player (1872–1952)

- Pitcher
- Born: July 11, 1872; Wellsville, Missouri, U.S.
- Died: August 25, 1952 (aged 80); Parsons, Kansas, U.S.
- Batted: Unknown Threw: Right

MLB debut
- October 5, 1898, for the St. Louis Browns

Last MLB appearance
- July 1, 1899, for the Cleveland Spiders

MLB statistics
- Win–loss record: 0–5
- Earned run average: 9.63
- Stats at Baseball Reference

Teams
- St. Louis Browns (1898); Cleveland Spiders (1899)

Harry Carr Maupin (July 11, 1872 – August 25, 1952) was an American Major League Baseball pitcher who played for two seasons. He pitched in two games for the St. Louis Browns during the 1898 season and five games for the Cleveland Spiders during the 1899 season. Maupin died at the age of 80 in Parsons, Kansas, and is interred at Oakwood Cemetery. He weighed approximately 150 pounds. His height was 5'7''.

== Childhood ==
Before he played professionally, Maupin played on an independent team located in Paris, Texas.

== Minor League work ==
After his work with the Cleveland Spiders, Maupin played in the minor league, specifically with St. Jospeph of the Western League in 1900. Afterwards, Maupin played five seasons with the Ottumwa of the Iowa League. He left the sport completely in 1905.

== Retirement and death ==
From 1905 onwards, Maupin was a conductor for the Katy Railroad for approximately 30 years. Fifteen years after his retirement. Maupin died of a heart attack in Parsons, Kansas.
