= Bill Hill (baseball) =

American baseball player (1874–1938)

- Pitcher
- Born: August 2, 1874; Chattanooga, Tennessee, U.S.
- Died: January 28, 1938 (aged 63); Cincinnati, Ohio, U.S.
- Batted: Left Threw: Left

MLB debut
- April 18, 1896, for the Louisville Colonels

Last MLB appearance
- September 13, 1899, for the Brooklyn Superbas

MLB statistics
- Win–loss record: 36-69
- Earned run average: 4.16
- Strikeouts: 280
- Stats at Baseball Reference

Teams
- Louisville Colonels (1896–1897); Cincinnati Reds (1898); Cleveland Spiders (1899); Baltimore Orioles (1899); Brooklyn Superbas (1899)

William Cicero Hill (August 2, 1874 — January 28, 1938) was an American Major League Baseball pitcher whose career in the National League lasted from 1896 to 1899.

Born in Chattanooga, Tennessee, Hill died in Cincinnati at the age of 63 and was interred at Evergreen Cemetery in the Cincinnati suburb of Southgate, Kentucky. His younger brother, Hugh Hill, was a Major League outfielder who played during the 1903 and 1904 seasons.
