= Charlie Ziegler =

American baseball player (1875–1904)

- Infielder
- Born: January 13, 1875; Canton, Ohio, U.S.
- Died: April 18, 1904 (aged 29); Canton, Ohio, U.S.
- Batted: Unknown Threw: Right

MLB debut
- September 23, 1899, for the Cleveland Spiders

Last MLB appearance
- June 6, 1900, for the Philadelphia Phillies

MLB statistics
- Games played: 5
- Batting average: .263
- Runs batted in: 1
- Stats at Baseball Reference

Teams
- Cleveland Spiders (1899); Philadelphia Phillies (1900)

Charles Wallace Ziegler (January 13, 1875 – April 18, 1904) was an American professional baseball infielder. He played parts of two seasons in Major League Baseball for the Cleveland Spiders and Philadelphia Phillies.
