= Eddie Kolb =

American baseball player (1880–1949)

- Pitcher
- Born: July 20, 1880; Cincinnati, Ohio, US
- Died: October 1, 1949 (aged 69); Calgary, Alberta, Canada
- Batted: Right Threw: Right

MLB debut
- October 15, 1899, for the Cleveland Spiders

Last MLB appearance
- October 15, 1899, for the Cleveland Spiders

MLB statistics
- Games pitched: 1
- Earned run average: 10.13
- Innings pitched: 8
- Stats at Baseball Reference

Teams
- Cleveland Spiders (1899)

Edward William "Eddie" Kolb (July 20, 1880 – October 1, 1949) was an American Major League Baseball pitcher from Cincinnati, Ohio, who pitched one game for the 1899 Cleveland Spiders. The Spiders that season were a horrible team, compiling a historically low win–loss record of 20–134. To finish off the season, the team ended with a 35 game road trip, losing 40 of their last 41 games. It was on the last game of the schedule, on October 15 (the second game of a doubleheader), that the team allowed a clerk at a local tobacco shop to pitch a game in exchange for a box of cigars. In that game, he pitched a complete game, giving up 18 hits, and 19 runs, 9 of which were earned. He did, however, get one hit in four at bats.

After the Cleveland Spiders folded after the season, and Eddie's short career came to end, he continued his enthusiastic involvement in baseball, playing and managing in several semi-professional leagues, spending his winters in Florida. At one point, he attempted to purchase the Montreal team of the New England League in 1908, which turned out to be unsuccessful. Having spent more than 15 years in baseball, he settled in Calgary, Alberta, Canada, and ran a successful restaurant. He ran his restaurant for 22 years until he became heavily involved in the development of an oil field in Turner Valley. It was this involvement that eventually saw him named as the first secretary of the Alberta Petroleum Association, which became the Western Canada Petroleum Association. Eddie died at the age of 69 in Calgary, and was cremated.
