= George Bristow (baseball) =

American baseball player (1870–1939)

- Outfielder
- Born: May 13, 1870; Paw Paw, Illinois, U.S.
- Died: October 17, 1939 (aged 69); Bellingham, Washington, U.S.
- Batted: Unknown Threw: Right

MLB debut
- April 15, 1899, for the Cleveland Spiders

Last MLB appearance
- May 8, 1899, for the Cleveland Spiders

MLB statistics
- Games played: 3
- Batting average: .125
- Doubles: 1
- Stats at Baseball Reference

Teams
- Cleveland Spiders (1899)

George Gates Bristow (May 13, 1870 – October 17, 1939) was an American professional baseball player. He played three games as an outfielder in Major League Baseball for the Cleveland Spiders in 1899. Bristow was 5 feet, 10 inches, and weighed 170 pounds.

== Career ==
Bristow was born in Paw Paw, Illinois, in 1870. He started his professional baseball career in 1894. In 1895, Bristow was a pitcher and captain for the Texas-Southern League's Galveston Sandcrabs. He won 23 consecutive games that year, breaking Jack Luby's "world's record" of 20. Bristow, who played second base while not pitching, also had a batting average of .341 in 89 games.

Bristow spent most of the following season playing for the Newark Colts of the Atlantic League. In 52 games there, he batted .324 and had a 10-7 win–loss record as a pitcher. Bristow then had one-year stints in the Texas League (Waco Tigers) and Southwestern League before being acquired by the National League's Cleveland Spiders in early 1899. He made his major league debut on April 15 against pitcher Cy Young, going hitless. On April 21, he sprained his ankle and had to leave the game. Bristow's third appearance came on May 8, when he replaced an ejected Lave Cross. Bristow doubled in that game for his first and only major league hit. Later that month, he was released to the Western League's Kansas City Blues and never appeared in the majors again.

For the next few years, Bristow played in the minors. He batted .251 in the Western League in 1900 before moving on to the Iowa-South Dakota League, Pacific National League, Pacific Coast League, and Northwestern League, where he was a player-manager in 1905.

Bristow's professional baseball career ended in 1906. He died in Bellingham, Washington, in 1939, and was buried in Woodlawn Cemetery.
