= Crazy Schmit =

American baseball player (1866–1940)

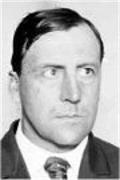
- Pitcher
- Born: February 13, 1866; Chicago, Illinois, U.S.
- Died: October 5, 1940 (aged 74); Chicago, Illinois, U.S.
- Batted: Left Threw: Left

MLB debut
- April 21, 1890, for the Pittsburgh Alleghenys

Last MLB appearance
- June 8, 1901, for the Baltimore Orioles

MLB statistics
- Win–loss record: 7–36
- Earned run average: 5.45
- Strikeouts: 93
- Stats at Baseball Reference

Teams
- Pittsburgh Alleghenys (1890); Baltimore Orioles (1892–1893); New York Giants (1893); Cleveland Spiders (1899); Baltimore Orioles (1901)

Frederick M. "Crazy" Schmit (February 13, 1866 – October 5, 1940) was an American professional pitcher in Major League Baseball. He played for the Pittsburgh Alleghenys, Baltimore Orioles of the National League, New York Giants, Cleveland Spiders, and Baltimore Orioles of the American League.

== Later life ==
At the time of the 1910 United States census, Schmit was living in Chicago with his wife Mary and their three children, Dorothy, Karl, and Frederick. Schmit's occupation was still listed as a "Professional Baseball player." In October 1940, he died of a heart attack and a cerebral hemorrhage at his home in Forest Glen section of Chicago.
