= Charlie Hemphill =

American baseball player (1876–1953)

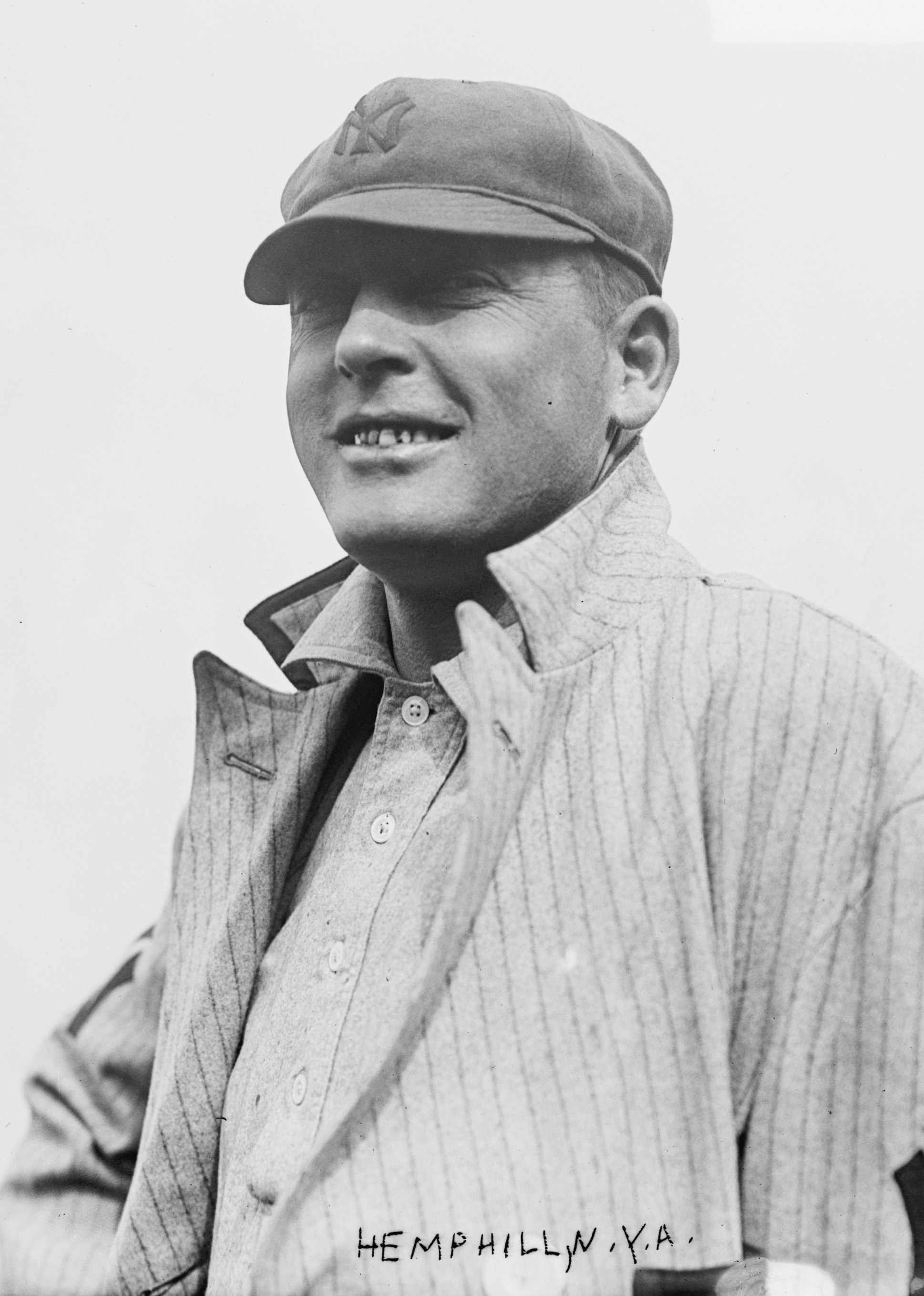
- Outfielder
- Born: April 20, 1876; Greenville, Michigan, US
- Died: June 22, 1953 (aged 77); Detroit, Michigan, US
- Batted: Left Threw: Left

MLB debut
- June 27, 1899, for the St. Louis Cardinals

Last MLB appearance
- October 3, 1911, for the New York Highlanders

MLB statistics
- Batting average: .271
- Hits: 1,230
- Home runs: 22
- Runs batted in: 421
- Stats at Baseball Reference

Teams
- St. Louis Perfectos / Cardinals (1899); Cleveland Spiders (1899); Boston Americans (1901); Cleveland Bronchos (1902); St. Louis Browns (1902–1904, 1906–1907); New York Highlanders (1908–1911)

Charles Judson "Eagle Eye" Hemphill (April 20, 1876 – June 22, 1953) was an American Major League Baseball outfielder with the St. Louis Cardinals, Cleveland Spiders, Boston Americans, Cleveland Bronchos, St. Louis Browns and the New York Highlanders between 1899 and 1911. Hemphill was listed at 5 ft 9 in (1.75 m), 160 lb., Hemphill batted and threw left-handed.

== Biography ==
Hemphill was born in Greenville, Michigan. His younger brother, Frank Hemphill, also was an outfielder.

Known as a line-drive hitter, Hemphill entered the major leagues in 1899 with the St. Louis Perfectos, appearing in 11 games before joining the Cleveland Spiders during mid-season. The St. Louis and Cleveland clubs, both owned by the Robinson Brothers, proceeded to transfer the Spider's top players to St. Louis, leaving Cleveland with an underqualified club. They finished the 1899 season with a record of 20–134 which is the worst mark in major league history. The Spiders folded at the end of the season and, Hemphill went to the Kansas City Blues of the newly created American League in 1900; the American League was still considered a minor league that year.

In 1901, Hemphill became the first opening day right fielder in the history of the Boston Red Sox. After that he played for the Cleveland Bronchos, St. Louis Browns and the New York Highlanders. His most productive season came in 1902, when he hit a combined .308 with Cleveland and St. Louis. He enjoyed another good season in 1908 with the Highlanders, hitting .298 with a career-high 42 stolen bases. His final season in the majors came in 1911 with the Highlanders, where he was a teammate of Chet Hoff, in what would be Hoff's only big-league campaign. Hoff wound up being the longest-lived player in major league baseball history, finally passing away at the age of 107 in 1998–nearly a century after his old teammate Hemphill first played in the majors.

In an 11-season career, Hemphill was a .271 hitter (1230-for-4541) with 22 home runs and 421 RBI in 1242 games, including 580 runs, 117 doubles, triples, 207 stolen bases, and a .337 on-base percentage. In 1175 outfield appearances, he played at center field (607), right (525) and left (45). He also played three games at second base.

Hemphill died in Detroit, Michigan, at age 77.

== See also ==
- List of Major League Baseball career stolen bases leaders
