= Otto Krueger (baseball) =

American baseball player (1876–1961)

- Infielder
- Born: September 17, 1876; Chicago, Illinois, U.S.
- Died: February 20, 1961 (aged 84); St. Louis, Missouri, U.S.
- Batted: Right Threw: Right

MLB debut
- September 16, 1899, for the Cleveland Spiders

Last MLB appearance
- September 22, 1905, for the Philadelphia Phillies

MLB statistics
- Batting average: .251
- Home runs: 5
- Runs batted in: 196
- Stats at Baseball Reference

Teams
- Cleveland Spiders (1899); St. Louis Cardinals (1900–1902); Pittsburgh Pirates (1903–1904); Philadelphia Phillies (1905)

Arthur William "Otto" Krueger (September 17, 1876 – February 20, 1961) was an American Major League Baseball player. Krueger played from 1899 to 1905 with several teams. He batted and threw right-handed.

He was born in Chicago, Illinois and died in St. Louis, Missouri.

Krueger was nicknamed "Oom Paul" after the president of the Transvaal, Paul Kruger, reflecting the strong American interest in the South African War.
