= Jesse Burkett =

American baseball player (1868–1953)

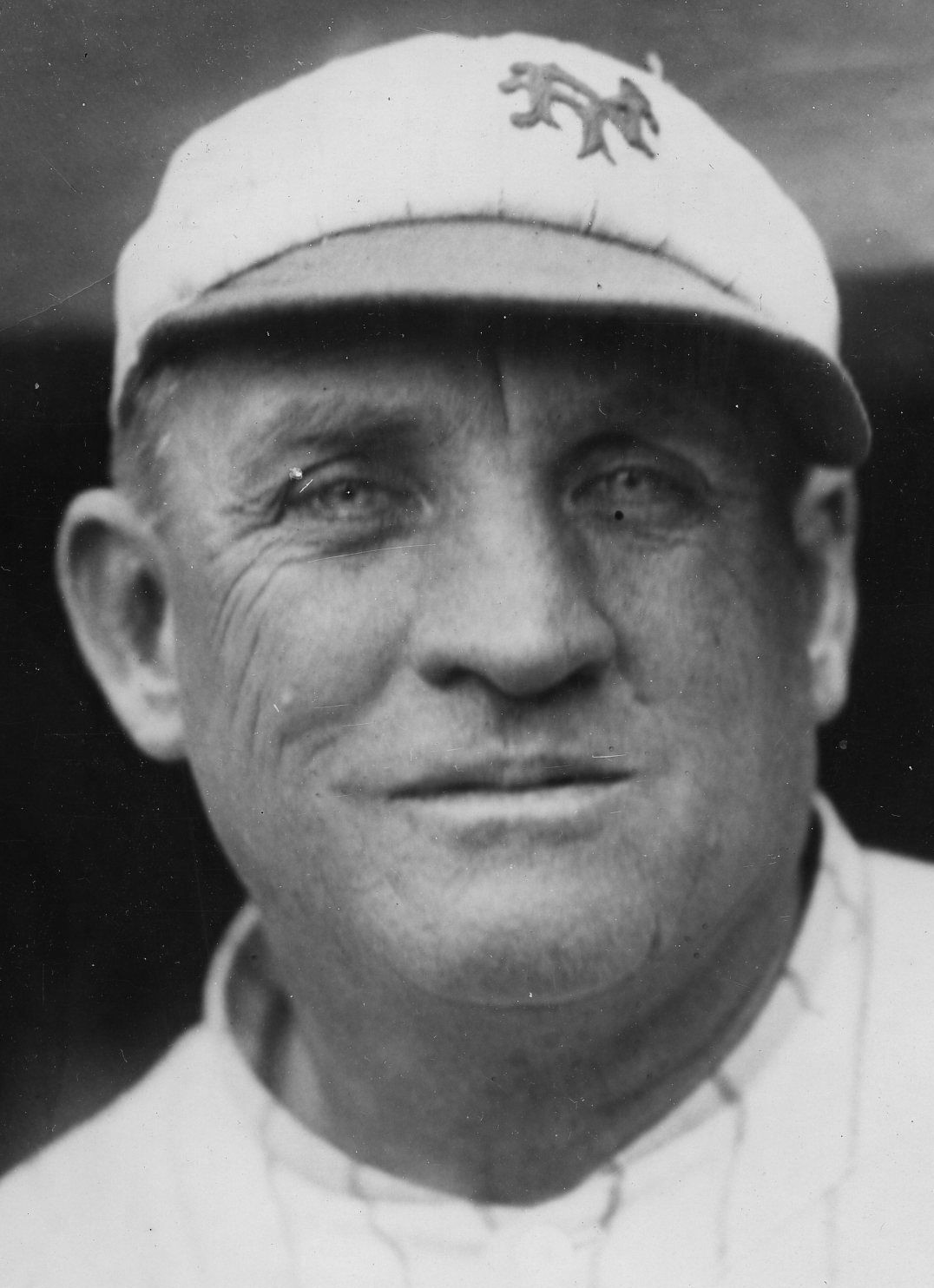
- Burkett in 1920
- Left fielder
- Born: December 4, 1868; Wheeling, West Virginia, U.S.
- Died: May 27, 1953 (aged 84); Worcester, Massachusetts, U.S.
- Batted: Left Threw: Left

MLB debut
- April 22, 1890, for the New York Giants

Last MLB appearance
- October 7, 1905, for the Boston Americans

MLB statistics
- Batting average: .338
- Hits: 2,850
- Home runs: 75
- Runs batted in: 952
- Stats at Baseball Reference

Teams
- New York Giants (1890); Cleveland Spiders (1891–1898); St. Louis Perfectos / Cardinals (1899–1901); St. Louis Browns (1902–1904); Boston Americans (1905)

Career highlights and awards
- World Series champion (1921); 3× NL batting champion (1895, 1896, 1901); Cleveland Guardians Hall of Fame

Member of the National

Baseball Hall of Fame
- Induction: 1946
- Election method: Old-Timers Committee

Jesse Cail Burkett (December 4, 1868 – May 27, 1953), nicknamed "Crab", was an American professional baseball left fielder. He played in Major League Baseball (MLB) from 1890 to 1905 for the New York Giants, Cleveland Spiders, St. Louis Perfectos / Cardinals, St. Louis Browns, and Boston Americans.

Burkett batted over .400 twice and held the major league single-season hits record for 15 years. After his playing career, Burkett managed in the minor leagues and college. In 1946, Burkett was elected into the National Baseball Hall of Fame. Burkett holds the record for the most inside-the-park home runs in MLB history, with 55. He is also regarded as one of the greatest bunters of all time.

== Early life ==
Burkett was born in Wheeling, West Virginia to Granville and Ellen Burkett. His father was a laborer and painter who worked for the Wheeling and Belmont Bridge Company. Beginning his professional career as a pitcher, he won 27 games at the age of 19 in 1888 for the Scranton Miners of the Central League. In 1889, he compiled a 39–6 win–loss record for the Worcester Grays of the New England League. He acquired his nickname, "Crab", due to his serious disposition, and willingness to argue, fight and insult sportswriters, umpires, opposing players, and rookies.

== Career ==
=== Early career ===
Burkett made his major league debut for the New York Giants of the National League (NL) in 1890 as a pitcher and outfielder. His pitching was ineffective as he went 3–10 with an earned run average of 5.57. As an outfielder he had a breakout year with a batting average of .309, good for second-best on the team. He was then purchased by the Cleveland Spiders in February 1891 and played most of 1891 in the minors, batting .316 for the Lincoln Rustlers and pitching to a 4–6 record. He played the last 40 games of the 1891 season with the Cleveland Spiders and continued to play for them through the 1898 season. In 1892, he hit .275 and was among the league's top ten players in runs scored and triples. The next season, his batting average increased to .348 (sixth highest in the league) and drew 98 walks (fifth-most in the league). He remained in the top ten in walks in almost every season throughout his career.

Burkett was never known as a great defender, but after committing a league leading 46 errors in 1893, he was coached by fellow outfielder Jimmy McAleer to improve his fielding. Nonetheless, he routinely finished in the top five for errors committed by an outfielder and has the fourth-most errors committed by an outfielder in history.

=== Peak years and batting .400 ===
In 1895, Burkett batted .405^{[a]} and led the NL in batting average, beating Ed Delahanty who also had an average of over .400, and hits (225), which were 12 more than Hall of Famer Willie Keeler. The following season, he set a career-high in batting average, at .410,^{[a]} and led the league in batting average, hits (240), and runs scored (160). His 240 hits were a major league record for 15 years until Ty Cobb hit 248 in 1911. Burkett was the second player in major league history to bat over .400 twice, the first being Ed Delahanty. The Spiders finished second in 1895 and 1896 and played the Baltimore Orioles both seasons in the Temple Cup series, beating the Orioles in 1895.

Early in the 1897 season, Burkett was hit in the head by a pitch by Fred Klobedanz which knocked him unconscious. He was out of action for two weeks, but played on May 31, collecting two hits in his first game back. On August 4, 1897, Burkett was ejected from both games of a doubleheader against the Louisville Colonels. In the first game, Burkett and an umpire (Bill Wolf) got into a heated argument and Burkett was thrown out; when he did not leave the field, the umpire threatened to forfeit the game to Louisville. Manager Patsy Tebeau agreed to forfeit the game to the Colonels by a score of 9–0. In the next game of the double header, the arguments against Bill Wolf continued, and by the ninth inning Burkett was ejected again. Similar to the first game, he did not leave the field and two police officers were called in and dragged Burkett from the field. In the 1897 season, Burkett finished third in batting average behind fellow Hall of Famers Willie Keeler and Fred Clarke.

=== Move to St. Louis and later career ===
By the end of 1898, the Cleveland Spiders were unable to afford to play in Cleveland and pay their highly paid players, and as a result played 35 of their last 38 games on the road. In the offseason, owner Frank Robison bought the struggling St. Louis Cardinals and in March 1898, Burkett and teammate Cy Young were moved from the Cleveland Spiders to the St. Louis Perfectos. Burkett played for the Perfectos/Cardinals for three seasons. In 1899, he had originally finished the season batting .402 (making him the first baseball player to hit .400 or greater in three separate seasons), but it was later lowered to .396.

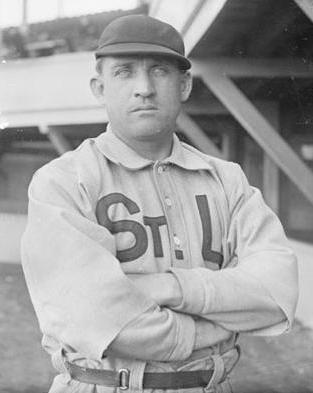
Burkett in 1903

In 1901, Burkett led the NL in batting average (.376), on-base percentage (.440), hits (226), and runs scored (142); this marked the third time he had led the league in batting average. Before the 1902 season, Burkett jumped to the St. Louis Browns of the American League and batted over .300 for the last time in his career. The following year, the American League began to count foul balls as strikes, causing his batting average to fall below .300 on the season for the first time since 1892. The next year, his batting average fell again to .271, and he had a career low in stolen bases. His errors in the outfield went down, but that was partially due to his decreased range and fewer opportunities.

In 1905, Burkett was traded to the Boston Americans for George Stone; this meant he could be closer to his home in Worcester. His level of play continued to decrease as he set a career low in batting average as Boston finished in fourth place at the end of the season. At the end of the season, he retired. He had the second most career hits in baseball at the time. He has the highest batting average (.378) and on-base percentage (.444) in St. Louis Cardinals history.

== Later life ==
Burkett managed the New England League's Worcester Busters from 1906 to 1915 and played some games for the team, as well. In 1906, he led the league with a .344 batting average.

Newspapers described Burkett as retiring from baseball in 1916. He secured a position with a brass factory in Worcester in December. However, he signed on as a coach with College of the Holy Cross late that month. In four seasons coaching the Holy Cross Crusaders, Burkett amassed an 88–12–1 record (.876) and winning regional championships in his first three seasons. Nine players on his 1919 team were designated All-East players.

Burkett managed New England minor league teams sporadically until 1933. He was elected into the Baseball Hall of Fame in 1946. The Wheeling native became the first West Virginian elected into the Hall of Fame. He was inducted into Holy Cross's Hall of Fame in 2009.

Burkett died in Worcester, Massachusetts, on May 27, 1953.

== See also ==
- List of Major League Baseball career batting average leaders
- List of Major League Baseball career on-base percentage leaders
- List of Major League Baseball career hits leaders
- List of Major League Baseball career triples leaders
- List of Major League Baseball career runs scored leaders
- List of Major League Baseball career stolen bases leaders
- List of Major League Baseball players with a .400 batting average in a season
- List of Major League Baseball batting champions
- List of Major League Baseball annual runs scored leaders

== Notes ==
- ^{a} Burkett was originally credited with a .423 batting average in 1895, which stood until 1922 but was later changed retroactively to .405.

Preceded by Hugh Duffy	Single season base hit record holders 1896–1910	Succeeded by Ty Cobb
