= Sport McAllister =

American baseball player (1874–1962)

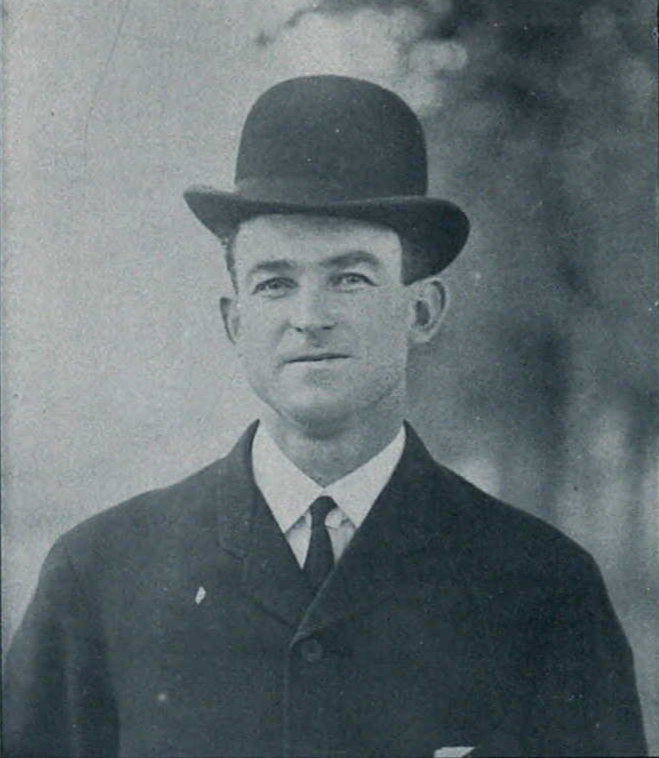
- McAllister from the 1906 Michiganensian
- Utility player
- Born: July 23, 1874; Austin, Mississippi, U.S.
- Died: July 17, 1962 (aged 87); Wyandotte, Michigan, U.S.
- Batted: Switch Threw: Right

MLB debut
- August 7, 1896, for the Cleveland Spiders

Last MLB appearance
- September 29, 1903, for the Detroit Tigers

MLB statistics
- Batting average: .247
- Home runs: 5
- Runs batted in: 164
- Stats at Baseball Reference

Teams
- Cleveland Spiders (1896–1899); Detroit Tigers (1901–1902); Baltimore Orioles (1902); Detroit Tigers (1902–1903)

Lewis William "Sport" McAllister (July 23, 1874 – July 17, 1962) was an American professional baseball player. He played seven seasons in Major League Baseball with the Cleveland Spiders (1896–1899), Detroit Tigers (1901–1903), and Baltimore Orioles (1902). He was a versatile switch hitter who played every position during his major league career. He played 147 games in the outfield, 83 at catcher, 65 at first base, 62 at shortstop, 27 at third base, and 7 at second base. He also pitched in 17 games, including 10 complete games.

In seven major league seasons, McAllister had a .247 batting average, with 358 hits, 61 extra base hits, 32 stolen bases, and 164 RBIs. His best season was 1901, the first season of the American League as a major league. He played 90 games for the Detroit Tigers and batted .301. McAllister and Kid Elberfeld became the first .300 hitters for the Tigers.

He umpired a July 15, 1900 minor league game between Cleveland and Detroit. After hostilities with the umpire the previous day, Tigers manager Tommy Burns feared that the crowd would injure umpire Joe Cantillon. Burns forfeited the game, but Cleveland manager Jimmy McAleer agreed to play using reserve player McAllister as the umpire. Detroit won 6–1. After retiring as a player, McAllister found his way to the University of Michigan and served two stints as the Wolverines' head baseball coach, in 1905-06 and again in 1908–09.

McAllister was the last surviving member of the infamous 1899 Cleveland Spiders, whose 20–134 record is the worst in major league history. He died in Wyandotte, Michigan in 1962, six days before his 88th birthday, and during the season of the team that holds the modern MLB mark for worst record: the 1962 New York Mets (40–120).
