= Jim Hughey =

American baseball player (1869–1945)

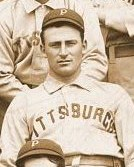
- Pitcher
- Born: March 8, 1869; Wakeshma, Michigan, U.S.
- Died: March 29, 1945 (aged 76); Coldwater, Michigan, U.S.
- Batted: Unknown Threw: Right

MLB debut
- September 29, 1891, for the Milwaukee Brewers

Last MLB appearance
- September 30, 1900, for the St. Louis Cardinals

MLB statistics
- Win–loss record: 29–80
- Earned run average: 4.87
- Strikeouts: 250
- Stats at Baseball Reference

Teams
- Milwaukee Brewers (1891); Chicago Colts (1893); Pittsburgh Pirates (1896–1897); St. Louis Browns (1898); Cleveland Spiders (1899); St. Louis Cardinals (1900)

James Ulysses Hughey (March 8, 1869 – March 29, 1945), born in Wakeshma, Michigan, was an American pitcher for the Milwaukee Brewers (1891), Chicago Colts (1893), Pittsburgh Pirates (1896–97), St. Louis Browns/St. Louis Cardinals (1898 and 1900) and Cleveland Spiders (1899).

He led the National League in losses (30) in 1899; he was the last player in Major League Baseball to have 30 losses in a season. In 7 seasons he had a 29–80 win–loss record, 145 games (113 started), 100 complete games, 28 games finished, 1 save, 1,007.2 innings pitched, 1,271 hits allowed, 748 runs allowed, 545 earned runs allowed, 21 home runs allowed, 317 walks allowed, 250 strikeouts, 46 hit batsmen, 37 wild pitches and a 4.87 ERA. His .266 win-loss percentage is the worst all-time among all pitchers with at least 100 pitching decisions.

He died in Coldwater, Michigan, at the age of 76.
