= Suter Sullivan =

American baseball player (1872–1925)

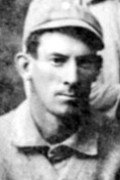
- Infielder
- Born: October 14, 1872; Baltimore, Maryland, U.S.
- Died: April 19, 1925 (aged 52); Baltimore, Maryland, U.S.
- Batted: Unknown Threw: Unknown

MLB debut
- July 24, 1898, for the St. Louis Browns

Last MLB appearance
- October 15, 1899, for the Cleveland Spiders

MLB statistics
- Batting average: .240
- Home runs: 0
- Runs batted in: 67
- Stats at Baseball Reference

Teams
- St. Louis Browns (1898); Cleveland Spiders (1899)

Suter Grant Sullivan (October 14, 1872 in Baltimore, Maryland – April 19, 1925 in Baltimore, Maryland) was an American infielder in Major League Baseball from 1898 to 1899. He played for the St. Louis Browns and Cleveland Spiders.
