= Stanley Robison =

American baseball owner and manager

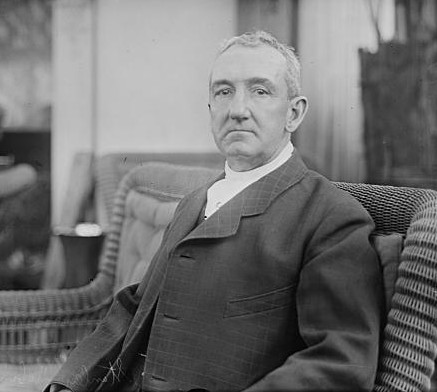
- Owner / Manager
- Born: March 30, 1854; Pittsburgh, Pennsylvania, U.S.
- Died: March 24, 1911 (aged 56); Cleveland, Ohio, U.S.
- Batted: Unknown Threw: Unknown

MLB debut
- August 10, 1905, for the St. Louis Cardinals

Last MLB appearance
- October 8, 1905, for the St. Louis Cardinals

MLB statistics
- Games managed: 50
- Win–loss record: 19–31
- Winning %: .380
- Stats at Baseball Reference

Teams
- St. Louis Cardinals (1905)

Martin Stanford "Stanley" Robison (March 30, 1854 – March 24, 1911) was an American owner and manager in Major League Baseball. Robison was the owner of the St. Louis Cardinals from 1899 to 1911, along with his brother Frank. He was also part-owner of the Cleveland Spiders for most of their existence, from 1887 to 1899. During the 1905 season, he took over as manager of the Cardinals for the final 50 games. He finished with a managerial record of 19 wins, 31 losses in 50 games. Born in Pittsburgh, Pennsylvania, he died in Cleveland, Ohio, where he is interred at Lake View Cemetery.

== See also ==
- St. Louis Cardinals managers and ownership
