= Frank Robison =

American baseball executive

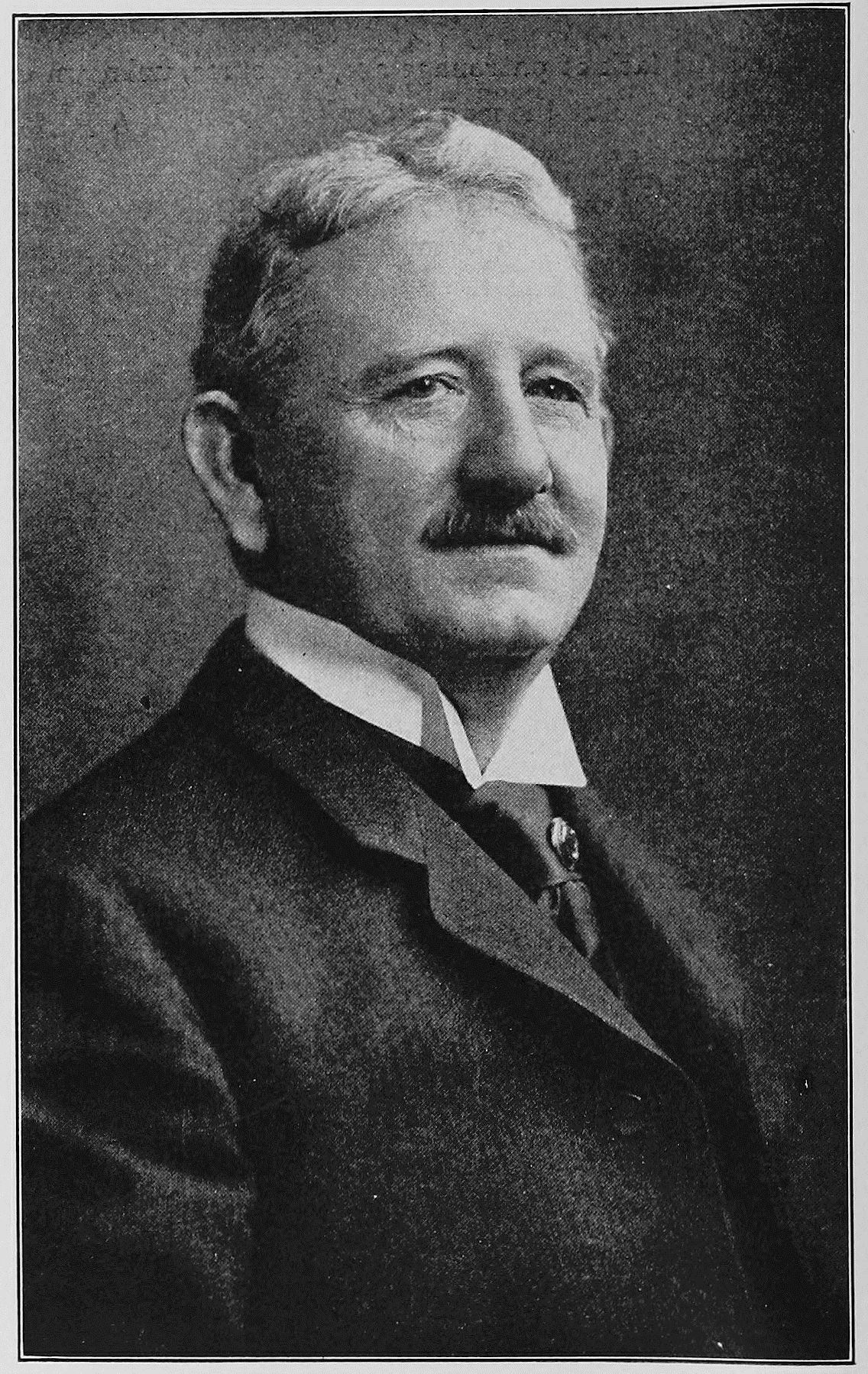
- Born: 1852; Pittsburgh, Pennsylvania, U.S.
- Died: September 25, 1908 (aged 55–56); Bratenahl, Ohio, U.S.
- Education: University of Delaware
- Known for: Major League Baseball executive

Frank DeHass Robison (1852 – September 25, 1908) was an American businessman, best known as a baseball executive. He was the organizer of the Cleveland Spiders franchise, and owned or part-owned the club throughout its existence, from its founding in 1887 as the Cleveland Blues until 1899. Along with his brother, Stanley Robison, he was also co-owner of the St. Louis Perfectos/Cardinals baseball team of the National League from 1899 until his death in 1908.

After briefly attending Delaware College (now University of Delaware), Robison went into business with his father-in-law, Charles Hathaway, operating streetcars in Cleveland, Ohio. In 1887, he used funds from this business to start up a baseball team, the Cleveland Blues (called the Forest Citys in some sources). He continued to operate in both areas for the next two decades, including financing the construction of League Park in 1889, and the formation of the Cleveland City Railway Company in 1893.

In 1899, the Robison brothers were responsible for the worst Major League Baseball team in history, the 1899 Cleveland Spiders. Before the season, the Robisons purchased the bankrupt St. Louis Browns from Chris von der Ahe and renamed them the Perfectos. During the single season in which they owned both the Spiders and Perfectos, the brothers transferred the best players of both franchises to St. Louis, leaving the Spiders with a team that finished with a record of 20-134, the worst full-season record ever for a major league baseball team. Following this debacle (and a similar one involving the Baltimore Orioles and Brooklyn Superbas), the practice of allowing the same owners to run multiple teams was outlawed.

Robison died of heart failure on September 25, 1908. Following his death, Stanley Robison became sole owner of the Cardinals until his death at his home in Bratenahl, Ohio in 1911, when the franchise was bequeathed to Frank's daughter (and Stanley's niece) Helene Hathaway Britton.
