= Cleveland Spiders =

American baseball team (1887–1899)

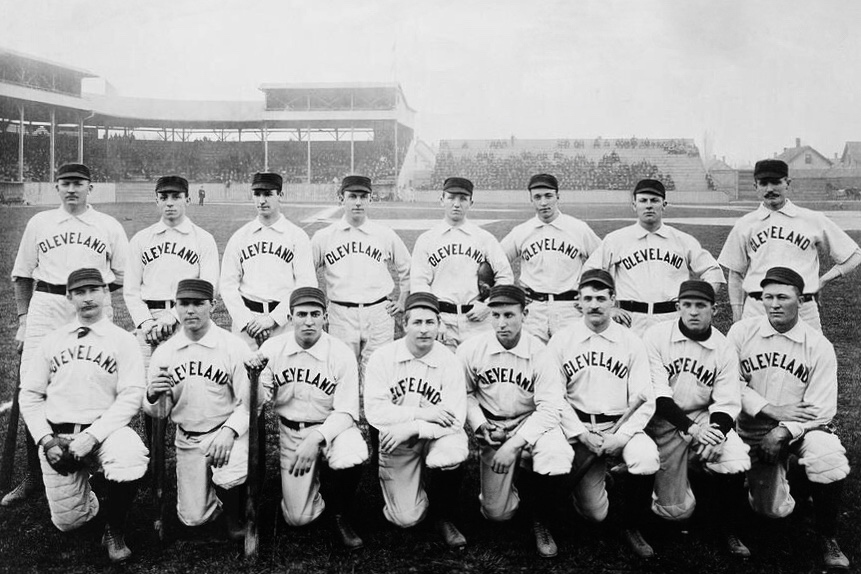
- Logo 1892 team photo at League Park, with the original wooden stands visible in the background

Information
- Location: Cleveland, Ohio
- Ballpark: League Park (1891–1899); National League Park (1887–1890)
- Founded: 1887
- Folded: 1899
- Temple Cup championships: 1 (1895)
- Former name: Forest Citys / Cleveland Blues (1887–1888)
- Former league: National League (1889–1899); American Association (1887–1888)
- Colors: Black, dark gray, white
- Ownership: Frank Robison & Stanley Robison (1887–1899)
- Manager: Joe Quinn (1899); Lave Cross (1899); Patsy Tebeau (1891–1898); Robert Leadley (1890–1891); Gus Schmelz (1890); Tom Loftus (1888–1889); Jimmy Williams (1887–1888)

The Cleveland Spiders were an American professional baseball team based in Cleveland, Ohio. The team competed at the major league level from 1887 to 1899, first for two seasons as a member of the now-defunct American Association (AA), followed by eleven seasons in the National League (NL). Early names for the team included the Forest Citys and Blues. The name Spiders itself emerged early in the team's inaugural NL season of 1889, owing to new black-and-gray uniforms and the skinny, long-limbed look of many players (thereby resembling the spider). National League Park served as the team's home for its first four seasons until the opening of League Park in 1891.

Amid seven straight winning seasons under manager Patsy Tebeau, the team finished second in the National League three times – in 1892, 1895, and 1896. While the Spiders never won the National League pennant, the club did win the 1895 Temple Cup, a two-team league championship playoff predating the World Series. The Spiders beat that year's pennant winner, the Baltimore Orioles (unrelated to the modern franchise), four games to one in a best-of-seven game series. Six Spiders players were later inducted into the National Baseball Hall of Fame, including left fielder Jesse Burkett and pitcher Cy Young.

In 1899, owners Frank and Stanley Robison purchased a second team – the bankrupt St. Louis NL franchise – and sent all of the Spiders' top talent to that club, including future Hall-of-Famers Young, Burkett, and Bobby Wallace. The resulting Spiders roster finished the 1899 season 20–134, a record which remains the worst for a single season in major league history. The Spiders were subsequently one of four teams contracted by the National League that year. Partly in response to the Robison brothers' actions – which effectively ended the Spiders franchise – the practice of "syndicate ownership" was later banned.

Spiders outfielder Louis Sockalexis played for the team during its final three seasons and is often credited as the first Native American to play major league baseball. The Cleveland Guardians, major league successor to the Spiders in Cleveland, have long cited Sockalexis as the inspiration for their controversial former team name – "Indians" – though that claim is disputed.

== History ==
The Spiders were the third professional baseball franchise based in Cleveland. The first team, Forest City, which played from 1870 through 1872, was initially an independent team before joining the National Association of Professional Base Ball Players for two seasons before disbanding. They were followed in 1879 by the city's first National League team, the Cleveland Blues, which folded after the 1884 season.

=== 1887–1888 ===
After the 1886 season, the Pittsburgh Alleghenys left the American Association (AA) to join the National League. The AA, then considered a major league, chose the Cleveland group headed by Frank Robison as an expansion team to begin play in 1887 over proposals from Kansas City and Detroit. Later, Robison's brother Stanley was added to the ownership group. Initially, the team was known as the Forest Citys, drawing on the city's nickname and the nickname that had been used on the city's two previous professional baseball teams. The nickname Blues was also used again in reference to the team uniforms. The Forest Citys were a weak team in their early years.

=== 1889–1898 ===
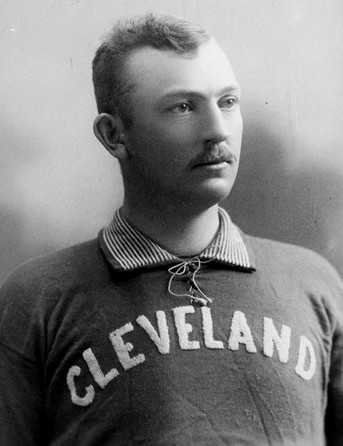
Cy Young in 1891

In 1889, they moved to the National League and became known as the Spiders, reportedly after comments from a team executive assessing the players. Frank H. Brunell, this team executive who also doubled as sportswriter for The Plain Dealer, noted the combination of the team's new black-and-gray uniforms together with the sight of several skinny, long-limbed players. He joked the team should be called "Spiders", and the name stuck. The team started to improve in 1891, largely due to the signing of future Baseball Hall of Fame pitcher Cy Young.

The Spiders had their first taste of success in 1892 when they finished 93–56 overall; winning the second half by three games over Boston with a 53–23 record. Other than standout second baseman Cupid Childs, the Spiders had an unremarkable offense. Their success in 1892 was built on pitching strength; Cy Young was the NL's most dominant hurler, and 22-year-old George Cuppy had an outstanding rookie year. Following the season, a "World's Championship Series" exhibition was played between Cleveland and the first-half winner Boston Beaneaters, but the Spiders could only muster one tie in six games.

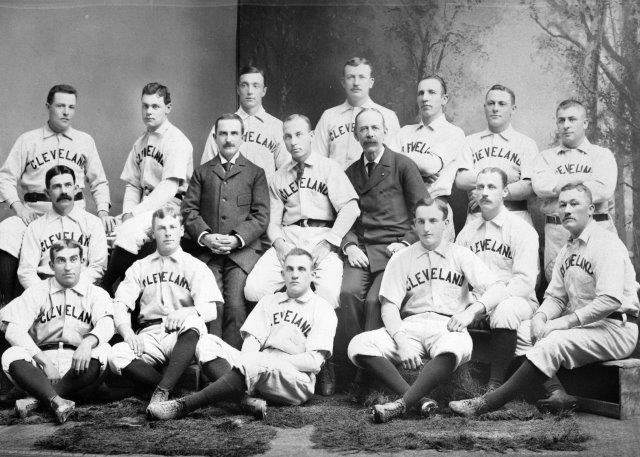
1895 Cleveland Spiders team

In 1895, the Spiders again finished second, this time to the equally rough-and-tumble Baltimore Orioles. Young again led the league in wins, and speedy left fielder Jesse Burkett won the batting title with a .409 average. The Spiders won the Temple Cup, an 1890s postseason series between the first- and second-place teams in the NL. Amid fan rowdyism and garbage-throwing, the Spiders won four of five games against Baltimore, including two wins for Cy Young.

The 1895 championship was the high-water mark for the franchise. The following season, Baltimore and Cleveland again finished first and second in the NL, but in the battle for the 1896 Temple Cup, the second-place Spiders were swept in four games. In 1897, despite a winning record, the franchise finished fifth, a season highlighted by Young throwing the first of three career no-hitters on September 18. The Spiders again finished fifth in 1898.

=== 1899 season ===
In 1899, the Spiders' owners, the Robison brothers, bought the St. Louis Browns out of bankruptcy and changed their name to the Perfectos. However, they kept the Spiders as well—a blatant conflict of interest. Believing the Perfectos would draw greater attendance in more densely populated St. Louis, the Robisons transferred most of the Cleveland stars, including future Baseball Hall of Famers Cy Young, Jesse Burkett, and Bobby Wallace, to St. Louis. They also shifted a large number of Cleveland home games to the road (for instance, the original Opening Day game was shifted to St. Louis).

With a decimated roster, the Spiders made a wretched showing. They finished with a dismal win-loss record of 20–134 (.130), the worst in MLB history, 84 games behind the pennant-winning Brooklyn Superbas and 35 games behind the next-to-last (11th) place Washington Senators. Their batting records were the worst in the league in runs, hits, doubles, triples, home runs, walks, stolen bases, on-base percentage, and slugging percentage.

The Robisons announced after buying the Perfectos that they intended to run the Spiders as a "sideshow", and Cleveland fans apparently took them at their word. The Spiders' first 16 home games drew a total of 3,179 fans, or an average of 199 fans per game. Due to these meager attendance figures, the other 11 NL teams refused to come to League Park, as their cut of the revenue from ticket sales did not even begin to cover their hotel and travel expenses. The Spiders were thus forced to play 85 of their remaining 93 games on the road. Altogether, the Spiders played 112 road games in 1899, a record that cannot be reached under current scheduling practices (the only time it was ever considered approachable was in 1994 when the Seattle Mariners were forced to play their remaining 118 games on the road due to ceiling damage at the Kingdome, but the season was cancelled due to the 1994-95 strike, with the Mariners having only played 68 of those games). Counting the large number of home games that had been shifted to the road earlier in the season, they only played 42 home games during the season, including only eight after July 1, and finished 9–33 (.214) at home and 11–101 (.098) on the road. Only 6,088 fans paid to attend Spiders home games in 1899, for a pitiful average of a mere 145 spectators per game in 9,000-seat League Park.

The 101 road losses is a major-league record that will never be threatened, as current scheduling practices have teams play a maximum of 81 away games. The team's longest winning streak of the season was two games, which they accomplished once: on May 20–21. Spiders opponents scored ten or more runs 49 times in 154 games. Pitchers Jim Hughey (4–30) and Charlie Knepper (4–22) tied for the team lead in wins.

The 1962 New York Mets, 40–120 (.250), and the 2024 Chicago White Sox, 41–121 (.253), own the modern records in their respective leagues for the most losses, and thus draw frequent comparisons to the 1899 Spiders for futility.

== Legacy ==
The Robisons' decision to effectively reduce the Spiders to minor league status, along with other intra-league raiding such as that conducted by the Dodgers and to a lesser extent the Pittsburgh Pirates, unwittingly helped pave the way to the National League's loss of its major league monopoly. The 12th-place Spiders were one of four teams contracted out of the National League at the end of the 1899 season (the others were the 11th-place Senators, the ninth-place Louisville Colonels and the bankrupt fourth-place Baltimore Orioles). The 1899 fiasco played a role in the major leagues passing a rule which barred one person from owning controlling interest in two clubs.

The Robisons sold the assets of the Spiders team to Charles Somers and John Kilfoyle in 1900. In 1900, the then-minor American League (previously the Western League) moved the Grand Rapids (baseball) team in to take the Spiders' place, and called the Cleveland Lake Shores. In 1901, after the American League declared major league status, the team was called the Cleveland Blues, eventually the Cleveland Indians, and now the Cleveland Guardians.

The Cleveland Guardians have long claimed Spiders outfielder Louis Sockalexis as the inspiration for their controversial former team name – "Indians" – in use from 1915 to 2021. Sockalexis played three seasons for the Cleveland Spiders, from 1897 to 1899, and is often credited as the first Native American to play professional baseball at the major league level. During his time with the Spiders, the press often referred to the team as the Indians or "Tebeau's Indians". The Cleveland Guardians claim has been disputed, however, including in a 2012 Cleveland Scene essay titled "The Curse of Chief Wahoo", which argues the organization cited Sockalexis in part to justify use of the "Indians" name.

== Baseball Hall of Famers ==
Cleveland Spiders Hall of Famers
Affiliation according to the National Baseball Hall of Fame and Museum
Cleveland Spiders

Jesse Burkett *
John Clarkson

George Davis
Buck Ewing

Bobby Wallace
Cy Young *

- Players and managers listed in **bold** are depicted on their Hall of Fame plaques wearing a cap insignia.
- * Cleveland Spiders listed as primary team according to the Hall of Fame

== See also ==
- Cleveland Spiders all-time roster
- List of Cleveland Spiders managers
- List of Cleveland Spiders Opening Day starting pitchers
