= 1899 New York Giants season =

1899 New York Giants
- League: National League
- Ballpark: Polo Grounds
- City: New York City
- Record: 60–90 (.400)
- League place: 10th
- Owners: Andrew Freedman
- Managers: John B. Day, Fred Hoey

The 1899 New York Giants season was the franchise's 17th season. The team finished in tenth place in the National League with a 60–90 record, 42 games behind the Brooklyn Superbas.

== Regular season ==
=== Season standings ===
National League
Team	W	L	Pct.	GB	Home	Road
Brooklyn Superbas	101	47	.682	—	61‍–‍16	40‍–‍31
Boston Beaneaters	95	57	.625	8	53‍–‍26	42‍–‍31
Philadelphia Phillies	94	58	.618	9	58‍–‍25	36‍–‍33
Baltimore Orioles	86	62	.581	15	51‍–‍24	35‍–‍38
St. Louis Perfectos	84	67	.556	18½	50‍–‍33	34‍–‍34
Cincinnati Reds	83	67	.553	19	57‍–‍29	26‍–‍38
Pittsburgh Pirates	76	73	.510	25½	49‍–‍34	27‍–‍39
Chicago Orphans	75	73	.507	26	44‍–‍39	31‍–‍34
Louisville Colonels	75	77	.493	28	33‍–‍28	42‍–‍49
New York Giants	60	90	.400	42	35‍–‍38	25‍–‍52
Washington Senators	54	98	.355	49	35‍–‍43	19‍–‍55
Cleveland Spiders	20	134	.130	84	9‍–‍33	11‍–‍101

=== Record vs. opponents ===
1899 National League record Sources:
Team	BAL	BSN	BRO	CHI	CIN	CLE	LOU	NYG	PHI	PIT	STL	WAS
Baltimore	—	7–7	6–8	9–5	4–9	12–2	6–7–2	10–4	6–7–1	9–3	8–6	9–4–1
Boston	7–7	—	6–8	5–7	10–4	11–3	9–5	12–2	5–9	10–4	8–6	12–2–1
Brooklyn	8–6	8–6	—	8–5–1	7–6	14–0	11–3	10–4	8–6	8–6	8–4–1	11–3
Chicago	5–9	7–5	5–8–1	—	8–6	13–1	7–7	7–6–1	5–9	6–7–2	8–6	4–9
Cincinnati	9–4	4–10	6–7	6–8	—	14–0	8–6	9–5–1	4–10	10–3–3	5–8–2	8–6–1
Cleveland	2–12	3–11	0–14	1–13	0–14	—	4–10	1–13	2–12	2–12	1–13	4–10
Louisville	7–6–2	5–9	3–11	7–7	6–8	10–4	—	7–7	7–6	6–8–1	5–9–1	12–2
New York	4–10	2–12	2–10	6–7–1	5–9–1	13–1	7–7	—	4–10–1	6–7	4–10	7–7
Philadelphia	7–6–1	9–5	6–8	9–5	10–4	12–2	6–7	10–4–1	—	6–8	7–7	12–2
Pittsburgh	3–9	4–10	6–8	7–6–2	3–10–3	12–2	8–6–1	7–6	8–6	—	7–7	11–3
St. Louis	6–8	6–8	4–8–1	6–8	8–5–2	13–1	9–5–1	10–4	7–7	7–7	—	8–6
Washington	4–9–1	2–12–1	3–11	9–4	6–8–1	10–4	2–12	7–7	2–12	3–11	6–8	—

=== Roster ===
1899 New York Giants
Roster
Pitchers: Bill Carrick; Tom Colcolough; Ed Doheny; Leo Fishel; Willie Garoni; Charlie Gettig; Youngy Johnson; Frank McPartlin; Jouett Meekin; Doc Sechrist; Cy Seymour	Catchers: Mike Grady; John O'Neill; Jack Warner; Parke Wilson; Infielders: Kid Carsey; George Davis; Ira Davis; Jack Doyle; Kid Gleason; Scott Hardesty; Fred Hartman; Frank Martin; John Puhl; Bill Stuart; Zeke Wrigley	Outfielders: Pete Cregan; Tom Fleming; Pop Foster; Tom O'Brien; Mike Tiernan; George Van Haltren; Pete Woodruff	Manager: John B. Day; Fred Hoey

== Player stats ==
=== Batting ===
==== Starters by position ====
Note: Pos = Position; G = Games played; AB = At bats; H = Hits; Avg. = Batting average; HR = Home runs; RBI = Runs batted in

Pos	Player	G	AB	H	Avg.	HR	RBI
C	Jack Warner	88	293	78	.266	0	19
1B	Jack Doyle	119	452	135	.299	3	77
2B	Kid Gleason	147	580	154	.266	0	60
SS	George Davis	109	419	141	.337	1	59
3B	Fred Hartman	51	177	42	.237	1	17
OF	Tom O'Brien	151	577	171	.296	6	77
OF	George Van Haltren	152	607	183	.301	2	58
OF	Pop Foster	84	301	89	.296	3	57

==== Other batters ====
Note: G = Games played; AB = At bats; H = Hits; Avg. = Batting average; HR = Home runs; RBI = Runs batted in

Player	G	AB	H	Avg.	HR	RBI
Parke Wilson	98	332	89	.268	0	42
Mike Grady	87	315	106	.337	2	54
Mike Tiernan	35	137	35	.255	0	7
Tom Fleming	22	77	16	.208	0	4
Scott Hardesty	22	72	16	.222	0	4
Pete Woodruff	20	61	15	.246	2	7
Frank Martin	17	54	14	.259	0	1
Kid Carsey	5	18	6	.333	0	1
Ira Davis	6	17	4	.235	0	2
Zeke Wrigley	4	15	3	.200	0	1
John O'Neill	2	7	0	.000	0	0
Bill Stuart	1	3	0	.000	0	0
John Puhl	1	2	0	.000	0	0
Pete Cregan	1	2	0	.000	0	0

=== Pitching ===
==== Starting pitchers ====
Note: G = Games pitched; IP = Innings pitched; W = Wins; L = Losses; ERA = Earned run average; SO = Strikeouts

Player	G	IP	W	L	ERA	SO
Bill Carrick	44	361.2	16	27	4.65	60
Ed Doheny	36	277.2	14	17	4.41	120
Cy Seymour	32	268.1	14	18	3.56	142
Jouett Meekin	18	148.1	5	11	4.37	30
Charlie Gettig	18	128.0	7	8	4.43	25
Tom Colcolough	11	81.2	4	5	3.97	14
Leo Fishel	1	9.0	0	1	6.00	6

==== Other pitchers ====
Note: G = Games pitched; IP = Innings pitched; W = Wins; L = Losses; ERA = Earned run average; SO = Strikeouts

Player	G	IP	W	L	ERA	SO
Willie Garoni	3	10.0	0	1	4.50	2

==== Relief pitchers ====
Note: G = Games pitched; W = Wins; L = Losses; SV = Saves; ERA = Earned run average; SO = Strikeouts

Player	G	W	L	SV	ERA	SO
Frank McPartlin	1	0	0	0	4.50	2
Youngy Johnson	1	0	0	0	0.00	1
Doc Sechrist	1	0	0	0	---	0
