= 1899 Chicago Orphans season =

Major League Baseball season

1899 Chicago Orphans
- League: National League
- Ballpark: West Side Park
- City: Chicago
- Record: 75–73 (.507)
- League place: 8th
- Owners: Albert Spalding
- Managers: Tom Burns

The 1899 Chicago Orphans season was the 28th season of the Chicago Orphans franchise, the 24th in the National League and the seventh at West Side Park. The Orphans finished eighth in the National League with a record of 75–73.

== Regular season ==
=== Season standings ===
National League
Team	W	L	Pct.	GB	Home	Road
Brooklyn Superbas	101	47	.682	—	61‍–‍16	40‍–‍31
Boston Beaneaters	95	57	.625	8	53‍–‍26	42‍–‍31
Philadelphia Phillies	94	58	.618	9	58‍–‍25	36‍–‍33
Baltimore Orioles	86	62	.581	15	51‍–‍24	35‍–‍38
St. Louis Perfectos	84	67	.556	18½	50‍–‍33	34‍–‍34
Cincinnati Reds	83	67	.553	19	57‍–‍29	26‍–‍38
Pittsburgh Pirates	76	73	.510	25½	49‍–‍34	27‍–‍39
Chicago Orphans	75	73	.507	26	44‍–‍39	31‍–‍34
Louisville Colonels	75	77	.493	28	33‍–‍28	42‍–‍49
New York Giants	60	90	.400	42	35‍–‍38	25‍–‍52
Washington Senators	54	98	.355	49	35‍–‍43	19‍–‍55
Cleveland Spiders	20	134	.130	84	9‍–‍33	11‍–‍101

=== Record vs. opponents ===
1899 National League record Sources:
Team	BAL	BSN	BRO	CHI	CIN	CLE	LOU	NYG	PHI	PIT	STL	WAS
Baltimore	—	7–7	6–8	9–5	4–9	12–2	6–7–2	10–4	6–7–1	9–3	8–6	9–4–1
Boston	7–7	—	6–8	5–7	10–4	11–3	9–5	12–2	5–9	10–4	8–6	12–2–1
Brooklyn	8–6	8–6	—	8–5–1	7–6	14–0	11–3	10–4	8–6	8–6	8–4–1	11–3
Chicago	5–9	7–5	5–8–1	—	8–6	13–1	7–7	7–6–1	5–9	6–7–2	8–6	4–9
Cincinnati	9–4	4–10	6–7	6–8	—	14–0	8–6	9–5–1	4–10	10–3–3	5–8–2	8–6–1
Cleveland	2–12	3–11	0–14	1–13	0–14	—	4–10	1–13	2–12	2–12	1–13	4–10
Louisville	7–6–2	5–9	3–11	7–7	6–8	10–4	—	7–7	7–6	6–8–1	5–9–1	12–2
New York	4–10	2–12	2–10	6–7–1	5–9–1	13–1	7–7	—	4–10–1	6–7	4–10	7–7
Philadelphia	7–6–1	9–5	6–8	9–5	10–4	12–2	6–7	10–4–1	—	6–8	7–7	12–2
Pittsburgh	3–9	4–10	6–8	7–6–2	3–10–3	12–2	8–6–1	7–6	8–6	—	7–7	11–3
St. Louis	6–8	6–8	4–8–1	6–8	8–5–2	13–1	9–5–1	10–4	7–7	7–7	—	8–6
Washington	4–9–1	2–12–1	3–11	9–4	6–8–1	10–4	2–12	7–7	2–12	3–11	6–8	—

== Roster ==
1899 Chicago Orphans
Roster
Pitchers: Nixey Callahan; Dick Cogan; Ned Garvin; Clark Griffith; Jack Katoll; John Malarkey; Bill Phyle; Skel Roach; Jack Taylor	Catchers: Frank Chance; Tim Donahue; Art Nichols; Infielders: Bill Bradley; Jim Connor; Doc Curley; Gene DeMontreville; Bill Everitt; George Magoon; Barry McCormick; Harry Wolverton	Outfielders: Danny Green; Bill Lange; Sam Mertes; Frank Quinn; Jimmy Ryan	Manager: Tom Burns

== Player stats ==
=== Batting ===
==== Starters by position ====
Note: Pos = Position; G = Games played; AB = At bats; H = Hits; Avg. = Batting average; HR = Home runs; RBI = Runs batted in

Pos	Player	G	AB	H	Avg.	HR	RBI
C	Tim Donahue	92	278	69	.248	0	29
1B	Bill Everitt	136	536	166	.310	1	74
2B	Barry McCormick	102	376	97	.258	2	52
SS	Gene DeMontreville	82	310	87	.281	0	40
3B	Harry Wolverton	99	389	111	.285	1	49
OF	Jimmy Ryan	125	525	158	.301	3	68
OF	Danny Green	117	475	140	.295	6	56
OF	Sam Mertes	117	426	127	.298	9	81

==== Other batters ====
Note: G = Games played; AB = At bats; H = Hits; Avg. = Batting average; HR = Home runs; RBI = Runs batted in

Player	G	AB	H	Avg.	HR	RBI
Bill Lange	107	416	135	.325	1	58
Jim Connor	69	234	48	.205	0	24
Frank Chance	64	192	55	.286	1	22
George Magoon	59	189	43	.228	0	21
Bill Bradley	35	129	40	.310	2	18
Art Nichols	17	47	12	.255	1	11
Doc Curley	10	37	4	.108	0	2
Frank Quinn	12	34	6	.176	0	1

=== Pitching ===
==== Starting pitchers ====
Note: G = Games pitched; IP = Innings pitched; W = Wins; L = Losses; ERA = Earned run average; SO = Strikeouts

Player	G	IP	W	L	ERA	SO
Jack Taylor	41	354.2	18	21	3.76	67
Clark Griffith	38	319.2	22	14	2.79	73
Nixey Callahan	35	294.1	21	12	3.06	77
Ned Garvin	24	199.0	9	13	2.85	69
Bill Phyle	10	83.2	1	8	4.20	10
Dick Cogan	5	44.0	2	3	4.30	9
Jack Katoll	2	18.0	1	1	6.00	1
John Malarkey	1	9.0	0	1	13.00	7
Skel Roach	1	9.0	1	0	3.00	0
