= Newark Colts =

- 1896–1900; Newark, New Jersey

Minor league affiliations
- Class: Class A (1896); Class B (1897–1898)); Class A (1899–1900)
- League: Atlantic League (1896–1900)

Major league affiliations
- Team: None

Minor league titles
- League titles (1): 1896

Team data
- Name: Newark Colts (1896–1900)
- Ballpark: Hamburg Place Ballpark (1896–1900)

The Newark Colts were a minor league baseball team based in Newark, New Jersey. From 1896 to 1900, the Colts played exclusively as members of the Atlantic League, winning the 1896 league championship.

The Colts hosted home games at the Hamburg Place Ballpark. The ballpark site evolved to become Wiedenmayer’s Park in 1902 and today's Riverbank Park, which is listed on the National Register of Historic Places.

The Newark Colts were preceded in Newark by the 1890 Newark Little Giants of the Atlantic Association and succeeded by the 1902 Newark Sailors of the Eastern League.

== History ==
In 1896, the Newark Colts became charter members of the seven–team Class A level Atlantic League, the highest level of minor leagues in the era. The Hartford Bluebirds, Lancaster Maroons, New Haven Texas Steers, Philadelphia Athletics, Paterson Silk Weavers and Wilmington Peaches joined Newark in beginning league play on April 23. 1896.

The Colts were founded by George Ellis, who steered the Colts to the first league championship with an 82-61 record while retaining his interest in his hometown club, Grand Rapids (who finished in the Western League cellar). Newark finished two games ahead of the second place Hartford Bluebirds (73–56) in the final standings of the seven–team league. They were followed by the Paterson Silk Weavers (74–60), Wilmington Peaches (58–79), New York Metropolitans/Philadelphia Athletics (57–69) and Lancaster Maroons (26–30) and New Haven Texas Steers (21–38) in the final standings. Lancaster and New Haven folded before the end of the season, leaving five teams to complete the 1896 season. Jack Rothfuss of Newark led the Atlantic League with both 13 home runs and 87 stolen bases.

After the 1896 season, Hartford challenged Newark's final record, arguing that it was unfairly inflated due to a dozen extra games played. It was argued that Newark also used suspended pitcher Joseph Frye, who had left Hartford mid-year. As a result, the second place Hartford team challenged Newark to a 7–game series to decide the championship. Newark declined the invitation and remained champions as decided by the league. The third place Paterson club accepted the Hartford invitation to play a series and prevailed over Hartford 5 games to 2 in what was called the "Soby Cup."

The 1897 Newark Colts were the runner–up as the Colts continued play as members of the eight–team Class B level Atlantic League, as the league expanded. Managed again by George Ellis, the Colts ended the 1897 season with a record of 89–52, placing second and finishing 4.0 games behind the first place Lancaster Maroons. Rasty Wright of Newark won the Atlantic League batting title, hitting .372. Newark pitcher Bill Carrick won 31 games to lead the Atlantic League.

The Newark Colts placed sixth in the 1898 Atlantic League. The Colts ended the 1898 season with a record of 58–71, as Oyster Burns served as manager. Newark finished 26.0 games behind the first place Richmond Bluebirds in final standings of the eight–team league. Pat Meaney of Newark won the Atlantic League batting championship, hitting .330.

The 1899 Newark Colts continued play as the Atlantic League was elevated to a Class A level league. Newark ended the 1899 season with a record of 42–54, placing sixth in the final standings, as Jim Field and Abner Powell managed the Colts during the season. Newark finished 25.0 games behind the first place Richmond Blue Birds in the final Atlantic League standings.

In their final season of play, the 1900 Newark Colts disbanded during the season. On June 2, 1900, the Newark Colts franchise folded with a record of 8–12 to that date as John Irwin served as the Newark manager in the partial season. The Jersey City team folded from the Atlantic League on the same day. On June 14, 1900, the Atlantic League folded. John Thornton of Newark led the Atlantic League in hitting during the brief season, batting .379.

After the Newark Colts folded, Newark, New Jersey was without a minor league team in 1901. The 1902 Newark Sailors began play as members of the Eastern League.

When the Atlantic League resumed play in 1914, the Newark Cubans were a member.

== The ballpark ==
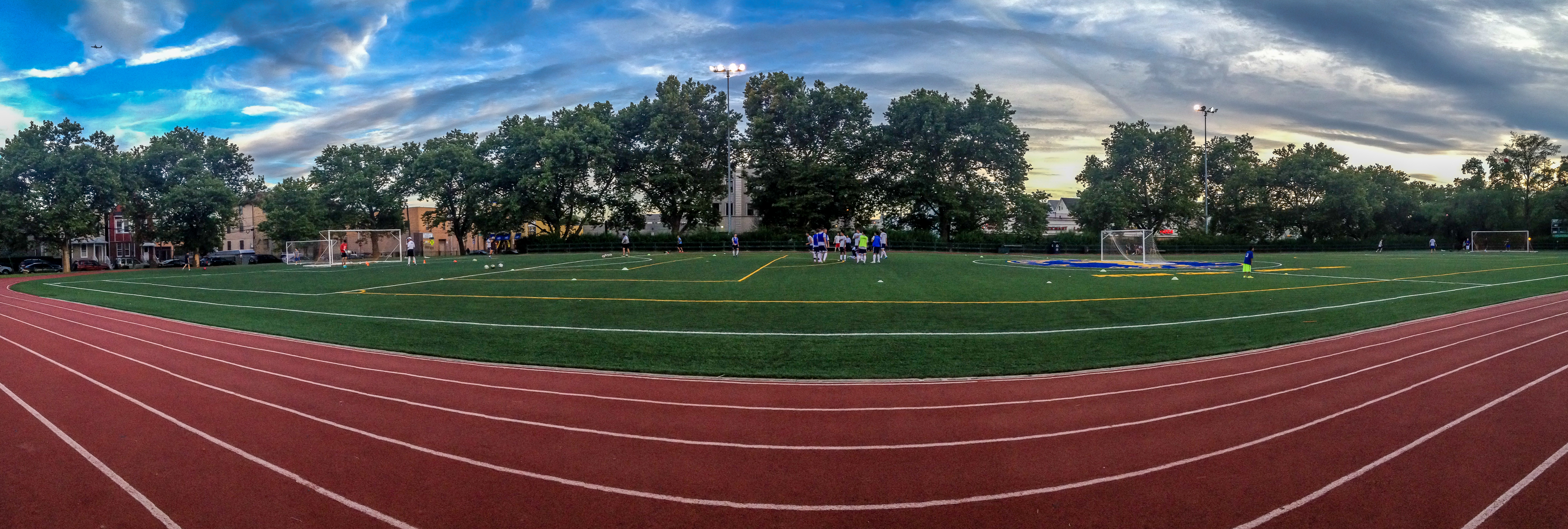
(2014) Soccer field and track within Riverbank Park, Newark, New Jersey.

The name of the Newark Colts' home ballpark was Hamburg Place, owned by local politician and businessman George Wiedenmayer. The site also hosted football and soccer. The ballpark site was adjacent to the Wiedenmayer & Sons Brewery owned by Wiedenmayer, with railroad and trolly access and the Passaic River nearby. A new ballpark on the site, dubbed Wiedenmayer’s Park, was built for the Newark Sailors team in 1902 with support from George Wiedenmayer. The brewing plant was located at 588 Market Street. In 1907, the site became a public park known as Riverbank Park and the park is still in use today as a public park with amenities. Riverbank Park is listed on the National Register of Historic Places.

== Timeline ==
Year(s)	# Yrs.	Team	Level	League	Ballpark
1896	1	Newark Colts	Class A	Atlantic League	Hamburg Place Ballpark (Riverbank Park)
1897–1998	2	Newark Colts	Class B	Atlantic League	Hamburg Place Ballpark (Riverbank Park)
1899–1900	2	Newark Colts	Class A	Atlantic League	Hamburg Place Ballpark (Riverbank Park)

== Year-by–year records ==
Year	Record	Finish	Manager	Playoffs/Notes
1896	82–61	1st	George Ellis	League champions
1897	89–52	2nd	George Ellis	No playoffs held
1898	58–71	6th	Oyster Burns	No playoffs held
1899	42–54	6th	Jim Field / Jack Chapman; Abner Powell	No playoffs held
1900	8–12	NA	John Irwin	Team folded June 2 League folded June 14

== Notable alumni ==
- Larry Battam (1898)
- Harry Bemis (1900)
- Tun Berger (1898)
- Jake Boyd (1897)
- George Bristow (1896)
- Stub Brown (1899)
- Oyster Burns (1896), (1898, MGR)
- Bill Byers (1899)
- Bobby Cargo (1896–1897)
- Bill Carrick (1897–1898)
- Pete Cassidy (1897–1898)
- Dick Cogan (1897–1899)
- Tom Delahanty (1897–1898)
- Tom Donovan (1899–1900)
- Davey Dunkle (1896)
- Harry Felix (1898)
- Jim Field (1899, MGR)
- Ned Garvin (1896)
- Bill George (1898)
- Charlie Gettig (1896–1897)
- Jim Gilman (1896)
- Joe Gunson (1899)
- Bill Hallman (1898)
- Scott Hardesty (1898-1899)
- Bill Hassamaer (1896)
- Gil Hatfield (1897)
- Larry Hesterfer (1899)
- Ducky Holmes (1897)
- John Irwin (1900, MGR)
- Charlie Jordan (1898)
- Jack Katoll (1898)
- Dan Kerwin (1896)
- Hi Ladd (1900)
- Tom Lipp (1896)
- Con Lucid (1896)
- Sam McMackin (1800)
- Frank McManus (1898)
- Frank McPartlin (1898-1899)
- George Merritt (1900)
- Bob Miller (1896)
- Willie Mills (1896)
- Parson Nicholson (1898)
- Hal O'Hagan (1896–1897)
- John Otten (1896)
- Ed Pabst (1899)
- Abner Powell (1899, MGR)
- Harry Raymond (1897)
- Mike Roach (1899)
- Jack Rothfuss (1896–1897)
- Ted Scheffler (1898–1899)
- Biff Sheehan (1800)
- Leo Smith (1896)
- Phenomenal Smith (1898)
- Stub Smith (1896, 1898)
- Bill Stuart (1896)
- George Stultz (1899)
- John Thornton (1899)
- Lee Viau (1900)
- Tom Vickery (1898)
- Bill Whitrock (1897)
- Sam Wise (1899)
- Sam Woodruff (1899)
- Rasty Wright (1896–1897)
- Dave Zearfoss (1897, 1900)

== See also ==
- Newark Colts players
- List of baseball parks in Newark, New Jersey
