= 1899 Baltimore Orioles season =

1899 Baltimore Orioles
- League: National League
- Ballpark: Union Park
- City: Baltimore, Maryland
- Record: 86–62 (.581)
- League place: 4th
- Owners: Harry Von der Horst
- Managers: John McGraw

The 1899 Baltimore Orioles season was a season in American baseball. It was the Orioles' 18th season in the major leagues, their 8th in the National League, and their last overall.

After the 1898 season, Orioles owner Harry Von der Horst acquired a controlling interest in the Brooklyn Bridegrooms ballclub and moved most of his star players and manager Ned Hanlon over to the Brooklyn team. The remaining team played the season under first year manager John McGraw and still won 86 games and finished in fourth place. After the season, the National League contracted and the Baltimore franchise was folded. The remaining players either were absorbed into Brooklyn or released to sign with another club.

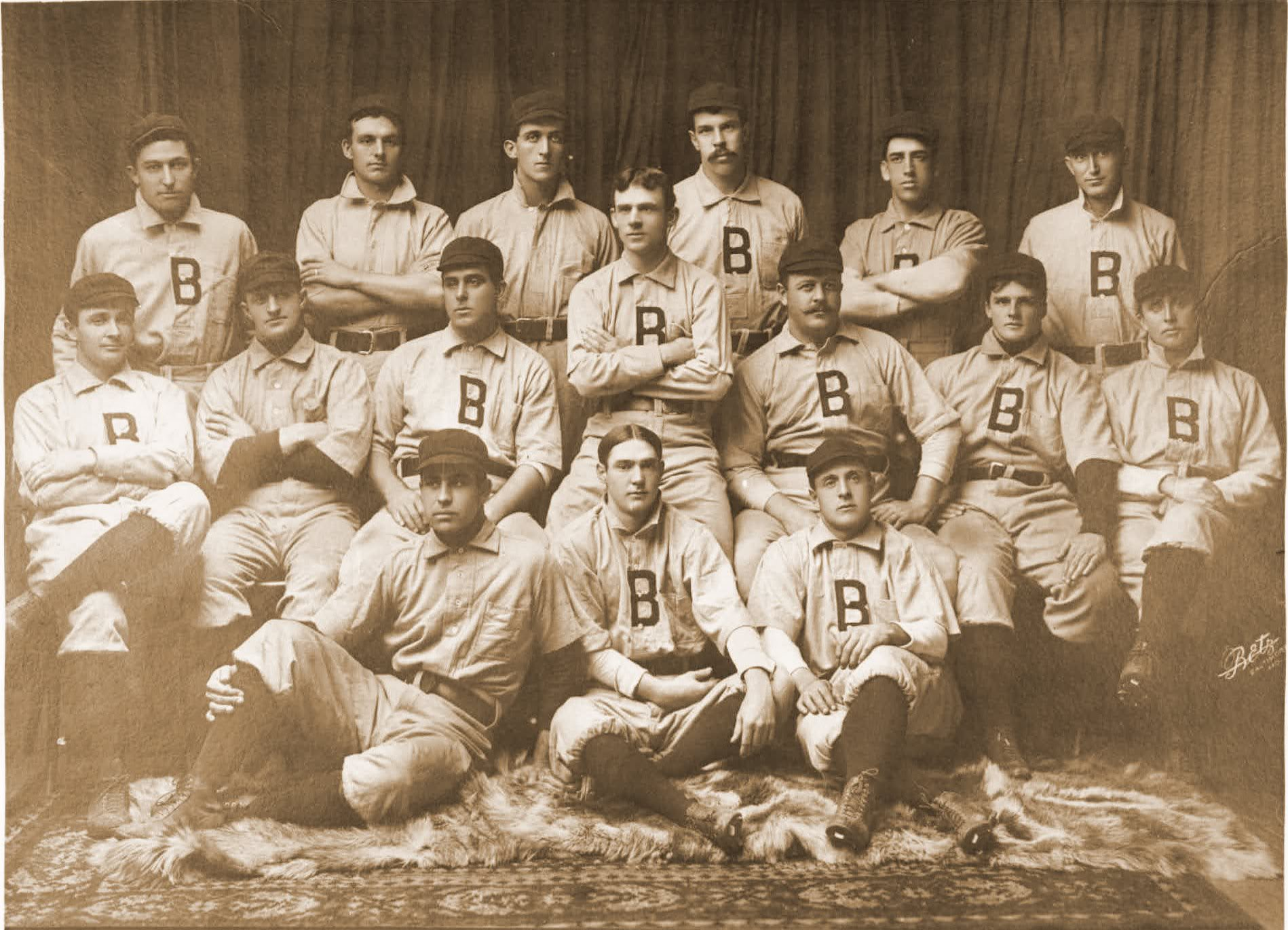
Team photograph

== Regular season ==
=== Season standings ===
National League
Team	W	L	Pct.	GB	Home	Road
Brooklyn Superbas	101	47	.682	—	61‍–‍16	40‍–‍31
Boston Beaneaters	95	57	.625	8	53‍–‍26	42‍–‍31
Philadelphia Phillies	94	58	.618	9	58‍–‍25	36‍–‍33
Baltimore Orioles	86	62	.581	15	51‍–‍24	35‍–‍38
St. Louis Perfectos	84	67	.556	18½	50‍–‍33	34‍–‍34
Cincinnati Reds	83	67	.553	19	57‍–‍29	26‍–‍38
Pittsburgh Pirates	76	73	.510	25½	49‍–‍34	27‍–‍39
Chicago Orphans	75	73	.507	26	44‍–‍39	31‍–‍34
Louisville Colonels	75	77	.493	28	33‍–‍28	42‍–‍49
New York Giants	60	90	.400	42	35‍–‍38	25‍–‍52
Washington Senators	54	98	.355	49	35‍–‍43	19‍–‍55
Cleveland Spiders	20	134	.130	84	9‍–‍33	11‍–‍101

=== Record vs. opponents ===
1899 National League record Sources:
Team	BAL	BSN	BRO	CHI	CIN	CLE	LOU	NYG	PHI	PIT	STL	WAS
Baltimore	—	7–7	6–8	9–5	4–9	12–2	6–7–2	10–4	6–7–1	9–3	8–6	9–4–1
Boston	7–7	—	6–8	5–7	10–4	11–3	9–5	12–2	5–9	10–4	8–6	12–2–1
Brooklyn	8–6	8–6	—	8–5–1	7–6	14–0	11–3	10–4	8–6	8–6	8–4–1	11–3
Chicago	5–9	7–5	5–8–1	—	8–6	13–1	7–7	7–6–1	5–9	6–7–2	8–6	4–9
Cincinnati	9–4	4–10	6–7	6–8	—	14–0	8–6	9–5–1	4–10	10–3–3	5–8–2	8–6–1
Cleveland	2–12	3–11	0–14	1–13	0–14	—	4–10	1–13	2–12	2–12	1–13	4–10
Louisville	7–6–2	5–9	3–11	7–7	6–8	10–4	—	7–7	7–6	6–8–1	5–9–1	12–2
New York	4–10	2–12	2–10	6–7–1	5–9–1	13–1	7–7	—	4–10–1	6–7	4–10	7–7
Philadelphia	7–6–1	9–5	6–8	9–5	10–4	12–2	6–7	10–4–1	—	6–8	7–7	12–2
Pittsburgh	3–9	4–10	6–8	7–6–2	3–10–3	12–2	8–6–1	7–6	8–6	—	7–7	11–3
St. Louis	6–8	6–8	4–8–1	6–8	8–5–2	13–1	9–5–1	10–4	7–7	7–7	—	8–6
Washington	4–9–1	2–12–1	3–11	9–4	6–8–1	10–4	2–12	7–7	2–12	3–11	6–8	—

=== Roster ===
1899 Baltimore Orioles
Roster
Pitchers: Bill Hill; Harry Howell; Frank Kitson; Joe McGinnity; Kit McKenna; Ralph Miller; Jerry Nops	Catchers: Wilbert Robinson; Jack Ryan; Aleck Smith; Infielders: Pat Crisham; Gene DeMontreville; Charlie Harris; Hughie Jennings; Bill Keister; Candy LaChance; George Magoon; John McGraw; John O'Brien; Bobby Rothermel	Outfielders: Steve Brodie; Dave Fultz; Ducky Holmes; Jimmy Sheckard	Manager: John McGraw

== Player stats ==
=== Batting ===
==== Starters by position ====
Note: Pos = Position; G = Games played; AB = At bats; H = Hits; Avg. = Batting average; HR = Home runs; RBI = Runs batted in

Pos	Player	G	AB	H	Avg.	HR	RBI
C	Wilbert Robinson	108	356	101	.284	0	47
1B	Candy LaChance	125	472	145	.307	1	75
2B	Gene DeMontreville	60	240	67	.279	1	36
SS	Bill Keister	136	523	172	.329	3	73
3B	John McGraw	117	399	156	.391	1	33
OF	Jimmy Sheckard	147	536	158	.295	3	75
OF	Steve Brodie	137	531	164	.309	3	87
OF	Ducky Holmes	138	553	177	.320	4	66

==== Other batters ====
Note: G = Games played; AB = At bats; H = Hits; Avg. = Batting average; HR = Home runs; RBI = Runs batted in

Player	G	AB	H	Avg.	HR	RBI
Dave Fultz	57	210	62	.295	0	18
George Magoon	62	207	53	.256	0	31
Pat Crisham	53	172	50	.291	0	20
John O'Brien	39	135	26	.193	1	17
Aleck Smith	41	120	46	.383	0	25
Charlie Harris	30	68	19	.279	0	1
Bobby Rothermel	10	21	2	.095	0	3
Hughie Jennings	2	8	3	.375	0	2
Jack Ryan	2	4	2	.500	0	1

=== Pitching ===
==== Starting pitchers ====
Note: G = Games pitched; IP = Innings pitched; W = Wins; L = Losses; ERA = Earned run average; SO = Strikeouts

Player	G	IP	W	L	ERA	SO
Joe McGinnity	48	366.1	28	16	2.68	74
Frank Kitson	40	326.2	22	16	2.78	75
Jerry Nops	33	259.0	17	11	4.03	60
Harry Howell	28	209.1	13	8	3.91	58
Bill Hill	8	61.0	3	4	3.25	17

==== Other pitchers ====
Note: G = Games pitched; IP = Innings pitched; W = Wins; L = Losses; ERA = Earned run average; SO = Strikeouts

Player	G	IP	W	L	ERA	SO
Kit McKenna	8	45.0	2	3	4.60	7
Ralph Miller	6	37.0	1	3	4.38	3
