= Portland (minor league baseball team) =

- 1893–1893; (1893); Portland, Oregon

Minor league affiliations
- Previous classes: None (see Minor League Baseball)
- League: Oregon State League

Major league affiliations
- Previous teams: None

Minor league titles
- League titles: None

Team data
- Previous names: None
- Previous parks: West End Grounds (June 25, 1893 – July 10, 1893); City View Park (May 30, 1893 – June 4, 1893)

Portland was the name of a professional baseball team that a member of the fleeting Oregon State League in 1893. Portland represented Portland, Oregon and played against teams from Albany, Independence, and Oregon City. In the early stages of the team, H. Hammond oversaw the club's operations. Later, W. H. Kennedy led the team financially and Edward Stapleton bore the managerial duties. Portland used City View Park as their home until switching to the West End Grounds after June 25. In all league games, Portland played 18 games compiling seven wins and 11 losses.

== Formation ==
A Portland club was one of the four planned team to be a member of the newly formed Oregon State League. In March, there was a report that Henry W. Hammond of Portland was working to get a baseball league in the State of Oregon. Hammond announced he was looking for financial backers for teams in Portland, Salem, Astoria, Albany, Eugene, The Dalles, and Oregon City. The name "Oregon State League" was later devised and expected to start sometime in late-May with a four-team circuit.

At a league convention on May 11, 1893 in Salem, Oregon, Hammond and Watts released the league constitution, and by-laws. Both stepped down as leaders of the league and in their place league owners voted W. M. Hunt of the Salem club as president. A few weeks later, Hunt announced the league's schedule would feature 36 games. The original league schedule had Albany traveling to Portland on May 27, however, the league's opening day was pushed back to May 30 due to bad weather. Before their first game, Portland worked deals with the local electric streetcar operators to give fans a discount of fare to City View Park, the club's home field. Admission into the park would cost twenty-five cents a person. Women, however, had the privilege of being admitted into the grandstands for free while their male counterparts were faced with an additional twenty-five cent charge.

== Regular season ==
Portland's official first game started at 2:45 p.m. on May 30, 1893. Their opponent was changed from Albany to Oregon City. The crowd was described as "large". Albert Collet of the Independence club was allowed to play for Portland since their newly signed second baseman had yet made it to town. Both teams played sloppy according to The Oregonian as Portland lost 13–19. Portland's second game was played against the Albany club at City View Park in front of a "small crowd". Albany took the game, 11–5.

On June 4, Portland faced Albany for the second time in as many days, losing to them by a score of 6–11. On their first road trip, Portland traveled to Albany where they were beat twice in one weekend (June 10–11). The final game of the series was in front of a crowd of 1,000 people. Portland's sixth straight loss since the opening of the season came on June 17 in Independence. It was noted that not many people turned out to see Portland fall to the home team 11–5.

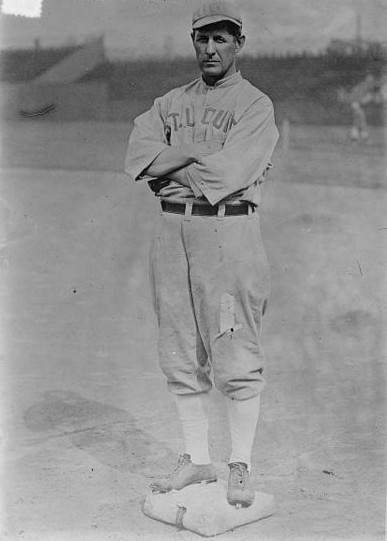
Fielder Jones signed with the Portland club at the start of the 1893 season.

Portland's first win of the season came on June 18 in Independence. Portland toppled the home team, 5–1. During their scheduled home game against Independence on June 24, Portland was forced to switch venues at the last minute since their ballpark was being occupied by an amateur team. The two clubs instead used the Oregon City ballpark where Portland defeated Independence 10–9. On June 25, Portland compiled 17 hits, and stole 26 bases in their victory over Independence. The two clubs instead used the Oregon City ballpark where Portland defeated Independence 10–9. Five-hundred spectators were present as Portland marked their first game at their new home, West End Grounds.

In their next four games, Portland faced Oregon City. The first two games were played on the weekend of July 2–3 in Oregon City. During the second game, Portland's Rankin hit two home runs. Both ended in losses for Portland. The teams traveled back to Portland for the next weekend's series. The two games took place at West End Grounds. Portland won both match-ups. During their next match-up in Albany on July 15, Portland out-scored the home team 19–12. Albany was defeated by Portland again the next day. The score was 7–4. Portland was two wins away from a .500 winning percentage with their 7–9 record going into their game against Albany which was scheduled to be played in Astoria, Oregon, on July 22. Albany won the closely contested game, 10–9. Portland's last recorded game came on July 30 at Oregon City. Portland was edged 6–5 in that contest. The league folded after the game and play was canceled.

It was announced on August 12, 1893, that the Portland club was going to travel to Boise, Idaho, to play their team. In the first game, Portland sent Youngy Johnson to start. Boise edged Portland 7–6. Portland also lost the second game, 10–8.

=== Roster ===
1893 Portland
Roster
Pitchers: Brown; Youngy Johnson; Versteeg; Catchers: Burns; Davey; Fielder Jones; Milligan; Schwartz	Infielders: Albert Collet; Frank Dowell; Fable; Gorge Forby; F. "Shorty" Howard; Johnson; E. "Trilby" Rankin; Edward Stapleton; Other players: Bradley	Outfielders: Fred Albert; Anderson; Baldwin; J. Bennett; Ewing; J. Jones; Lanford; Myers; Neidenmeyer; Prince; Reed; Joe Shea; Managers: Edward Stapleton; W. H. Kennedy

=== Game log ===
No.	Date	Opponent	Score	Location	Venue	Attendance	Record
1	May 30	Oregon City	13–19	Portland, Oregon	City View Park	"large"	0–1
2	June 3	Albany	5–11	Portland, Oregon	City View Park	"small"	0–2
3	June 4	Albany	6–11	Portland, Oregon	City View Park	N/A	0–3
4	June 10	Albany	3–6	Albany, Oregon	N/A	N/A	0–4
5	June 11	Albany	9–17	Albany, Oregon	N/A	1,000	0–5
6	June 17	Independence	5–11	Independence, Oregon	N/A	"not large"	0–6
7	June 18	Independence	5–1	Independence, Oregon	N/A	N/A	1–6
8	June 24	Independence	10–9	Oregon City, Oregon	Oregon City Grounds	"small"	2–6
9	June 25	Independence	10–4	Portland, Oregon	West End Grounds	500	3–6
10	July 2	Oregon City	4–11	Oregon City, Oregon	Oregon City Grounds	500	3–7
11	July 3	Oregon City	4–8	Oregon City, Oregon	Oregon City Grounds	"good"	3–8
12	July 4	Oregon City	5–7	Oregon City, Oregon	Oregon City Grounds	N/A	3–9
13	July 9	Oregon City	11–9	Portland, Oregon	West End Grounds	N/A	4–9
14	July 10	Oregon City	10–7	Portland, Oregon	West End Grounds	"large"	5–9
15	July 15	Albany	19–12	Albany, Oregon	N/A	N/A	6–9
16	July 16	Albany	7–4	Albany, Oregon	N/A	N/A	7–9
17	July 22	Albany	9–10	Astoria, Oregon	N/A	N/A	7–10
18	July 31	Oregon City	5–6	Oregon City, Oregon	Oregon City Grounds	"well attended"	7–11
19	August 14	Boise	6–7	Boise, Idaho	N/A	N/A	7–12
20	August 14	Boise	8–10	Boise, Idaho	N/A	N/A	7–13
