= Rothfuss =

Rothfuss is a surname. Notable people with the surname include:

- Andrea Rothfuss (born 1989), German para-alpine skier
- Chris Rothfuss (born 1972), American politician
- Jack Rothfuss (1872–1947), American baseball player
- Patrick Rothfuss (born 1973), American fantasy writer and college lecturer
- Rainer Rothfuß (born 1971) German politician
