= Willie Garoni =

American baseball player (1877–1914)

- Pitcher
- Born: July 28, 1877; Fort Lee, New Jersey, U.S.
- Died: September 9, 1914 (aged 37); Fort Lee, New Jersey, U.S.
- Batted: Right Threw: Right

MLB debut
- September 7, 1899, for the New York Giants

Last MLB appearance
- September 22, 1899, for the New York Giants

MLB statistics
- Win–loss record: 0–1
- Earned run average: 4.50
- Strikeouts: 2
- Stats at Baseball Reference

Teams
- New York Giants (1899)

William Garoni (July 28, 1877 – September 9, 1914) was an American professional baseball player. He played for the New York Giants of the National League in September 1899.

Garoni was a pitcher with the New York Athletic Club when he was signed by the Giants prior to the 1899 season. He was given a trial in a preseason game against Columbia University but did not impress. The review of his performance in The New York Herald was as follows: "Garoni will never do for [National] League company if his work in yesterday's game is taken as a criterion. Such heavy batting teams as the Brooklyns, Bostons or Cincinnatis would want nothing easier than stand up before the New York A. C. pitcher. Garoni lacks control, has no curves to speak of and is not quick enough in fielding his position." He was thus farmed out to Bridgeport to start the season and not recalled to the major league club until September. He made his big league debut on September 7 against the Baltimore Orioles, relieving Charlie Gettig in eighth inning. Baltimore scored three runs in the final two innings and, according to the Herald, Garoni "did nothing to show that he would ever be able to win a [National] League game." Garoni made his second appearance on September 17 in a game played against the St. Louis Browns in Weehawken in his native New Jersey. He entered the game after the fifth inning in relief of Bill Carrick and kept the Browns scoreless for the final three innings. Garoni's final major league outing was on September 22, 1899. He pitched a complete game but took the loss against the Pittsburgh Pirates in a shortened five-inning game.

He is buried at Fairview Cemetery in New Jersey.
