= Stub Smith =

American baseball player (1873–1947)

- Shortstop
- Born: November 24, 1873; Elmwood, Illinois, U.S.
- Died: November 14, 1947 (aged 73); Fall River, Massachusetts, U.S.
- Batted: Left Threw: Right

MLB debut
- September 10, 1898, for the Boston Beaneaters

Last MLB appearance
- October 15, 1898, for the Boston Beaneaters

MLB statistics
- Games played: 3
- At bats: 10
- Hits: 1
- Stats at Baseball Reference

Teams
- Boston Beaneaters (1898)

James Abner "Stub" Smith (November 24, 1873 – November 14, 1947) was an American shortstop in Major League Baseball. He played for the Boston Beaneaters in 1898 and was 5'6" in height. After his brief major-league stint, Smith played in the minor leagues from 1898 to 1906, appearing for teams such as the Fall River Indians, Newark Colts, Portland Phenoms, New Orleans Pelicans, and Memphis Egyptians.
