= Charlie Harris (third baseman) =

American baseball player (1877–1963)

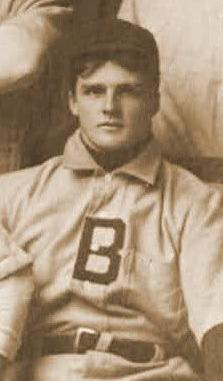
- Third baseman
- Born: October 21, 1877; Macon, Georgia
- Died: March 14, 1963 (aged 85); Gainesville, Florida
- Batted: Right Threw: Right

MLB debut
- May 26, 1899, for the Baltimore Orioles

Last MLB appearance
- October 14, 1899, for the Baltimore Orioles

MLB statistics
- Batting average: .279
- Hits: 19
- Runs scored: 16
- Stats at Baseball Reference

Teams
- Baltimore Orioles (1899)

Charles Jenkins Harris (October 21, 1877 – March 14, 1963) was an American Major League Baseball third baseman who played for the Baltimore Orioles in 1899. He stood 5'8" and weighed 200 pounds. He batted and threw right-handed. Born in Macon, Georgia in 1877, he attended Mercer University.

== Professional career ==
Harris was signed by the Orioles as an amateur free agent prior to the 1899 season. He made his debut on May 26 and played in his last game on October 14. In total, he appeared in 30 games, mostly at third base, but also briefly played each of the corner outfield and middle infield positions. Harris received 73 plate appearances and produced a slash line of .279/.319/.324. He scored 16 runs, stole four bases, and recorded one run batted in. The Orioles folded after the 1899 season, and Harris did not play in the major leagues again.

While on the Orioles, Harris developed a friendship with player-manager and future Hall of Famer John McGraw.

== Later life and death ==
After his baseball career, Harris ran a grocery store in Gainesville, Florida. He died in 1963 in Gainesville and is buried in that city's Evergreen Cemetery.
