= New York Giants (Players' League) =

Defunct American baseball team

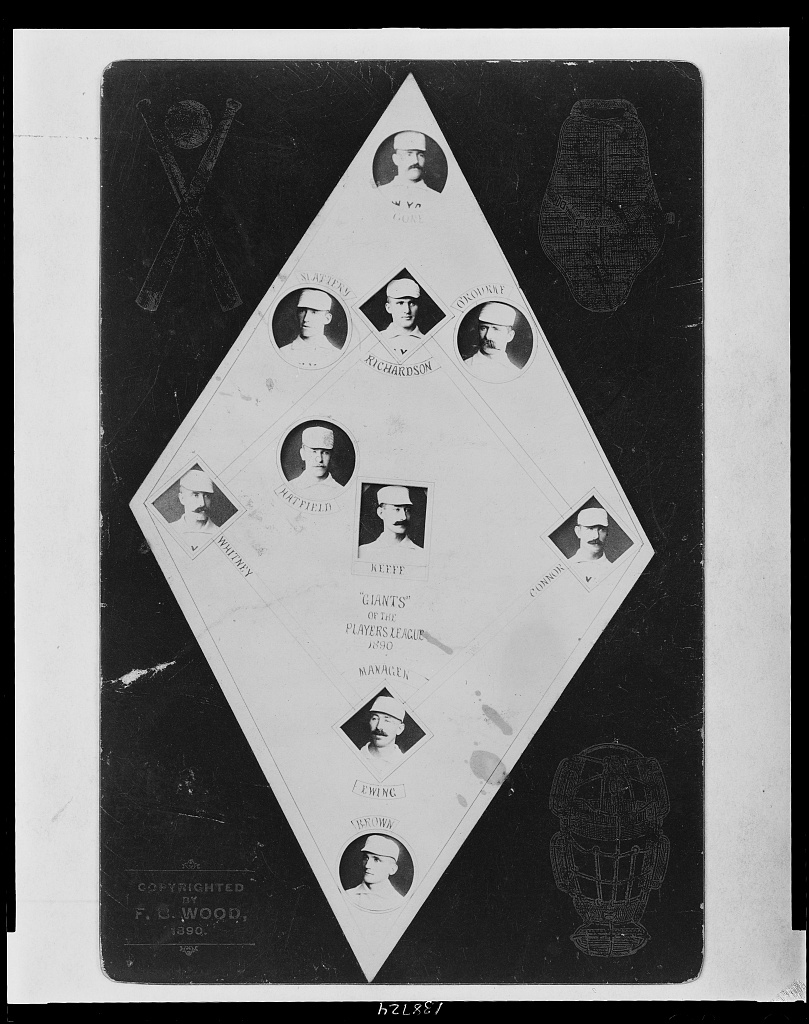
- Logo A group portrait of the 1890 Giants

Information
- League: Players' League (1890)
- Location: New York, New York
- Ballpark: Polo Grounds III (1890)
- Founded: 1890
- Folded: 1890
- Ownership: Edward Talcott
- Manager: Buck Ewing

In 1890, the short-lived Players' League included a team called the New York Giants. This baseball team was managed by Hall of Famer Buck Ewing, and they finished third with a record of 74–57. Besides Ewing, who was also a catcher on this team, the roster included several former members of the National League New York Giants, such as Hall of Famers Roger Connor, Jim O'Rourke, Hank O'Day, and Tim Keefe. The team played its home games at the Polo Grounds.

After the season, their owner, Edward Talcott, bought a minority stake in the National League Giants—in effect, merging the two clubs.

== See also ==
- 1890 New York Giants (PL) season
