= John O'Neill (baseball) =

American baseball player

- Catcher
- Born: New York City, New York, U.S.
- Batted: Unknown Threw: Right

MLB debut
- September 6, 1899, for the New York Giants

Last MLB appearance
- September 5, 1902, for the New York Giants

MLB statistics
- Games played: 4
- At bats: 15
- hits: 0
- Stats at Baseball Reference

Teams
- New York Giants (1899, 1902)

John J. O'Neill was an American Major League Baseball player. He was born in New York City.

Little is known about this utility who played for the New York Giants in parts of two seasons. Used as a backup catcher for John Warner (1899) and Frank Bowerman (1902), O'Neill appeared in four games and went hitless in 15 at-bats (.000). As a catcher, he collected 19 outs with eight assists and committed four errors for a .931 fielding percentage.
