= Frank Martin (baseball) =

American baseball player (1878–1942)

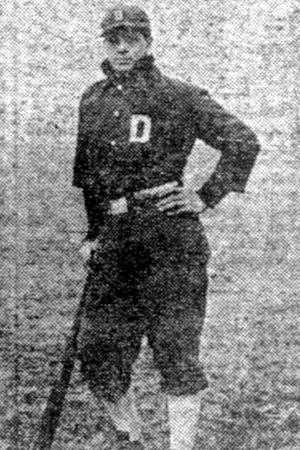
- Third baseman
- Born: July 29, 1878; Denver, Colorado, U.S.
- Died: September 2, 1942 (aged 64); Chicago, Illinois, U.S.
- Batted: Unknown Threw: Unknown

MLB debut
- June 30, 1897, for the Louisville Colonels

Last MLB appearance
- September 25, 1899, for the New York Giants

MLB statistics
- At bats: 66
- Hits: 16
- Batting average: .242
- Stats at Baseball Reference

Teams
- Louisville Colonels (1897); Chicago Orphans (1898); New York Giants (1899)

Frank Joseph Martin (July 29, 1878 – September 2, 1942) was an American Major League Baseball third baseman.

== Sources ==
- Career statistics from Baseball Reference · Baseball Reference (Minors) · Retrosheet · Baseball Almanac
