= Edward Talcott =

American stockbroker and baseball executive

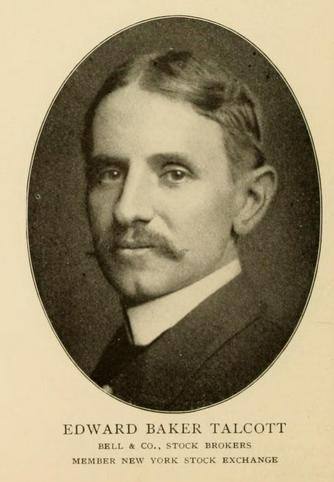
- Born: January 21, 1858; New York City, New York, U.S.
- Died: April 5, 1941 (aged 83); Point Pleasant Beach, New Jersey, US

Edward Baker Talcott (January 21, 1858 – April 5, 1941) was an American stockbroker and Major League Baseball executive.

== Career as a stockbroker ==
Talcott began a career on Wall Street in 1874, working for his father. He joined the Charles F. Hardy & Co. firm following an apprenticeship in 1879. By 1880, he purchased a seat at the stock exchange. From August 1898 to January 1899, Talcott was reported to have made about $1 million on the stock market, and he then resigned from his firm. He remained a member of the stock exchange until 1901.

== Baseball career ==
In November 1889, Talcott financed the New York Giants franchise to compete in the new Players' League for 1890, along with Buck Ewing, Edwin McAlpin, Cornelius Van Cott and John Montgomery Ward.

In October 1890, Talcott was among several financial backers to secure the purchase of the Cincinnati Reds from Aaron S. Stern, with the intent of placing the Reds in the Players' League for 1891.

However, in November 1890, Talcott, McAlpin, and Brooklyn Ward's Wonders owner Wendell Goodwin agreed to merge their clubs with the National League counterparts, the Brooklyn Dodgers and New York Giants. The Players League would officially collapsed later that month, with McAlpin and Talcott claiming they lost $8,000 on the endeavor. The Cincinnati National League team that Talcott purchased a share of was instead replaced with a new franchise, with John T. Brush as the principal owner.

With Talcott now a minority owner in the National League's Giants, he remained associated with the club until he sold his shares to Andrew Freedman after the 1894 season.

In January 1902, Talcott was approached by Albert Spalding, who suggested Talcott purchase a controlling interest in the Giants back from Freedman. Freedman would ultimately sell his shares to Brush in September 1902.
