= Fred Hoey (baseball manager) =

American baseball manager

- Manager
- Born: January 21, 1865; New York City, U.S.
- Died: December 7, 1933 (aged 68); Paris, France

MLB statistics
- Games managed: 87
- Managerial record: 31–55
- Winning percentage: .360

Teams
- New York Giants (1899)

Frederick Chamberlain Hoey (January 21, 1865 – December 7, 1933) was an American manager in professional baseball in the late 19th century.

Hoey's first involvement with baseball was as the business manager for New York Giants owner Andrew Freedman in 1898. In July 1899, Hoey was named manager of the Giants, succeeding John B. Day, under whom the team had gone 29–35. Managing the 1899 Giants through the end of the season, Hoey compiled a record of 31 wins and 55 losses in 87 games (one contest ended in a tie). It was his only stint as a major league manager.

Outside of baseball, Hoey was a well-known competitor in pigeon-shooting, a precursor to the sport of trap shooting. Hoey also worked as a representative for the stables of Joseph E. Widener, and lived the final 20 years of his life in Paris.

== See also ==
- San Francisco Giants general managers and managers
