= John B. Day =

American tobacco merchant and baseball executive

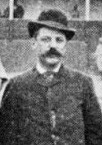
- Day in 1884
- Owner / Manager
- Born: September 23, 1847; Colchester, Connecticut, U.S.
- Died: January 25, 1925 (aged 77); Cliffside, New Jersey, U.S.

MLB statistics
- Games managed: 66
- Managerial record: 29–35
- Winning %: .453

Teams
- As manager: New York Giants (1899)

John Bailey Day (September 23, 1847 – January 25, 1925) was an American tobacco merchant who became an owner and manager in professional baseball of the late 19th century. He was the first owner of the franchise now known as the San Francisco Giants.

== Biography ==
Day was born in Colchester, Connecticut, in 1847. He became wealthy first in the cigar manufacturing business, and then by opening a tobacco processing plant in Manhattan's Lower East Side.

Day was founding owner of the independent New York Metropolitans in 1880 and leased the Polo Grounds for them to play in, which was the first baseball large-scale venue in Manhattan. In 1883, his New York Gothams/Giants of the National League began play at the same site. By 1885, Day concentrated his attentions on the Giants team. Encountering financial difficulties, mainly as a result of the 1890 Players' League revolt, in January 1893 he sold the Giants franchise to Cornelius Van Cott.

Day was the first of two managers for the 1899 New York Giants, leading the team to a 29–35 record in 66 games played (two contests were ties); he was succeeded by Fred Hoey. In 1900, Day served as the National League's chief of umpires.

Later in life, Day suffered the first of several strokes in 1910. He died at age 77 in 1925, having lost his fortune, in Cliffside, New Jersey. Married twice but without children, Day was interred at Portland, Connecticut.
