= Tom Lipp =

American baseball player (1870–1932)

- Pitcher
- Born: June 4, 1870; Baltimore, Maryland, U.S.
- Died: May 30, 1932 (aged 61); Baltimore, Maryland, U.S.
- Batted: Unknown Threw: Right

MLB debut
- September 18, 1897, for the Philadelphia Phillies

Last MLB appearance
- September 18, 1897, for the Philadelphia Phillies

MLB statistics
- Win–loss record: 0-1
- Strikeouts: 1
- Earned run average: 15.00
- Stats at Baseball Reference

Teams
- Philadelphia Phillies 1897

Thomas Charles Lipp born Thomas Charles Lieb (June 4, 1870 – May 30, 1932) was an American professional baseball player who played in one game for the Philadelphia Phillies during the 1897 season. He was born in Baltimore, Maryland and died there at the age of 61.

Lipp played for numerous minor league teams during his professional career. While in the minors, he was both a pitcher and an outfielder. His career began with the Lynchburg Hill Climbers of the independent Virginia League in 1894. In 1896, he played for four separate minor league teams. He was a member of the Sunbury Pirates of the independent Central Pennsylvania League, the Roanoke Magicians of the class B Virginia League, the Hagerstown Lions of the independent Cumberland Valley League and the Newark Colts of the Atlantic League. While with the Hagerstown Lions, he had a pitching record of ten wins and two losses, leading the Cumberland Valley League in wins and winning percentage.

After his major league appearance with the Phillies, Lipp returned to the minor leagues. He last played with the Columbia Gamecocks and the Savannah Pathfinders of the South Atlantic League in 1905. As a minor league pitcher he had an overall record of 21–18, with an earned run average of 1.87. As a minor league batter, he had a batting average of .332 with only one home run.
