= List of baseball parks in Newark, New Jersey =

This is a list of venues used for professional baseball in Newark, New Jersey and adjacent cities.

== Parks ==
- Waverly Fairgrounds aka Waverly Park
  - Home of: Elizabeth Resolutes - independent through 1872 / National Association 1873.
  - Location: part of a community called Waverly, which was bordered by Lower Road (now Dayton Avenue), Haynes Avenue, and Frelinghuysen Street
  - Currently: Weequahic Park in Newark
- Wright Street Grounds
  - Home of:
    - Newark Domestics/Little Giants - Eastern League (1884-1886)
    - Newark Giants - International League (1887 only)
    - Newark Trunkmakers - Central League (1888 only)
    - Newark Little Giants - Atlantic Association (1889-1890) [per local newspapers]
  - Location: on a block bounded by Wright Street (northeast, third base); buildings and Avenue A (northwest, first base); Vanderpool Street (southwest, right field); and Avenue B (southeast, left field) [per Sanborn map]
- Shooting Park aka Schützen Park
  - Home of Newark - Atlantic League
  - Location: on a block touched by South Orange Avenue, Munn Avenue, Myrtle Avenue and Rodwell Avenue. The Atlantic League club played on a diamond somewhere within the park.
  - Currently: The property evolved into what is now Vailsburg Park.
- Wiedenmayer's Park
  - Home of:
    - Newark Sailors/Indians - Eastern League / International League(1902 - mid-1915) (to Harrisburg) / new club Indians/Bears 1916 through 1918
    - Newark Cubans - Atlantic League (1914 only) to Long Branch mid-1914
    - Also one American League game on July 17, 1904
  - Location: Hamburgh (or Hamburg) Place (now Wilson Avenue) and Avenue L teeing into Hamburgh (northeast, home plate); railroad tracks and Heller & Merz Company buildings and Avenue M (southeast, left field); East Kinney Street or possibly Delancy Street (southwest, center field); buildings and Avenue K (northwest, right field) [per Okkonen]
    - (adjacent to the later site of Ruppert Stadium)
  - Currently: Avenue L extended, and food service businesses
  - SABR article on the ballpark
- Morris Park
  - Home of: Newark - Atlantic League (1907 only)
  - Location: on Bloomfield Avenue
- Harrison Park aka Harrison Field aka Federal League Park
  - Home of: Newark Peppers - Federal League (1915); Newark Bears - International League (1919) (to Syracuse); Newark Bears again - International League (1921-mid-1923) (field burned on August 18, 1923)
  - Location: Harrison, New Jersey, a city adjacent to Newark - Middlesex Street [now Angelo Cifelli Drive] (north, third base); South 3rd Street (east, left field); Burlington Avenue (south, right field); South 2nd Street (west, first base); also railroad yards skirting the southeast corner of the property.
  - Currently: Industrial plant
  - SABR article on the ballpark
- Meadowbrook Oval aka Meadowbrook Field aka Asylum Oval
  - Home of: Newark Bears - International League (1924 - mid-1925) moved to Providence; moved back for 1926; Newark Dodgers - Negro National League (1934–35)
  - Location: South Orange Avenue (southwest, third base); buildings and South 12th Street (southeast, first base); asylum and Fairmount Cemetery (north, center field)
  - Currently: West Side High School
    - Sanborn map showing faint outline of the ballpark, 1930
- Ruppert Stadium originally Davids' Stadium, then Bears Stadium
  - Home of:
    - Newark Bears - International League (1926-1949)
    - Newark Eagles - Negro National League (1936-1948)
      - also the site of some major league games from time to time
  - Other sports: Newark Bears - first American Football League (1926)
  - Location: Hamburgh (or Hamburg) Place (now Wilson Avenue) (northeast, home plate); Avenue L and Heller & Merz Company buildings (southeast, left field); East Kinney Street (southwest, center field); Avenue K (northwest, right field)
  - Currently: Industrial plant
  - SABR article on the ballpark
- Newark Schools Stadium originally City Field
  - Home of: Newark Stars - Eastern Colored League (1926 part season)
  - Location: North 10th Street (northwest); 1st Avenue West (southwest); Roseville Avenue / North 8th Street (southeast); Bloomfield Avenue (northeast) [per Lowry]
  - Currently: rebuilt in 2011
  - Sanborn map showing embryonic facilities, 1920
- Sprague Field aka General Electric Field
  - Home of Newark Browns - East-West League (1932) / independent other years
  - Location: in Bloomfield, New Jersey - Bloomfield Avenue (northeast); LaFrance Avenue (southeast); Floyd Avenue (southwest); Arlington Avenue (west and northwest) - stated as first base line, third base line, left field, and center and right fields, respectively
  - Currently: Felton Playground
  - SABR article on the ballpark
- Bears & Eagles Riverfront Stadium
  - Home of: Newark Bears - Atlantic League of Professional Baseball (1999-2013)
  - Location: 450 Broad Street, Newark (west, first base); Division Street (north, third base); Bridge Street (south, right field); Highway 21 and Passaic River (east, left field)
  - Currently: demolished, land being redeveloped

== See also ==
- Sports in Newark, New Jersey
- Lists of baseball parks

== Sources ==
- Peter Filichia, Professional Baseball Franchises, Facts on File, 1993.
- Michael Benson, Ballparks of North America, McFarland, 1989.
- Marc Okkonen, The Federal League of 1914-1915: Baseball's Third Major League, SABR, 1989.
