= Leo Fishel =

American baseball player (1877–1960)

- Pitcher
- Born: December 13, 1877; Babylon, New York, U.S.
- Died: May 19, 1960 (aged 82); Hempstead, New York, U.S.
- Batted: Right Threw: Right

MLB debut
- May 3, 1899, for the New York Giants

Last MLB appearance
- May 3, 1899, for the New York Giants

MLB statistics
- Win–loss record: 0–1
- Earned run average: 6.00
- Strikeouts: 6
- Stats at Baseball Reference

Teams
- New York Giants (1899)

Leo Fishel (December 13, 1877 – May 19, 1960) was an American pitcher in Major League Baseball who played one game for the New York Giants in 1899. He also attended Columbia University and became a lawyer after his professional baseball career was over. Fishel stood at 6' 0" and weighed 175 lbs.

== Biography ==
Leo Fishel was born in Babylon, New York, as the youngest of eight children to Leopold and Theresa Fishel. He entered Columbia in the fall of 1894 and pitched for the baseball team there while also playing for various semi-pro teams around New York and New Jersey. He was once offered US$20 plus expenses to pitch in a game for White Plains.

On May 3, 1899, Fishel made his major league debut for the New York Giants, pitching a complete game and taking the loss. He was the first Jewish pitcher in Major League Baseball. Later that summer, he played for the New London Whalers and New Haven Blues of the Connecticut State League. Fishel went 2-4 in the CSL and did not play any professional baseball after 1899.

Fishel graduated from Columbia Law School in 1900 and was admitted to the bar later that year. He became coach of the Columbia baseball team in early 1901 and over the next few years played and coached various teams in the area while setting up his law practice. In 1905, he won a championship while coaching the Freeport High School team.

Fishel was married twice. His first marriage to Mary Blossom Searle in 1903 produced one daughter, but it ended in divorce. He later married Laura Duerstein, and his second child, a son, was born in 1917.

Fishel died in Hempstead, New York, in 1960.
