= Fred Hartman =

American baseball player (1868–1938)

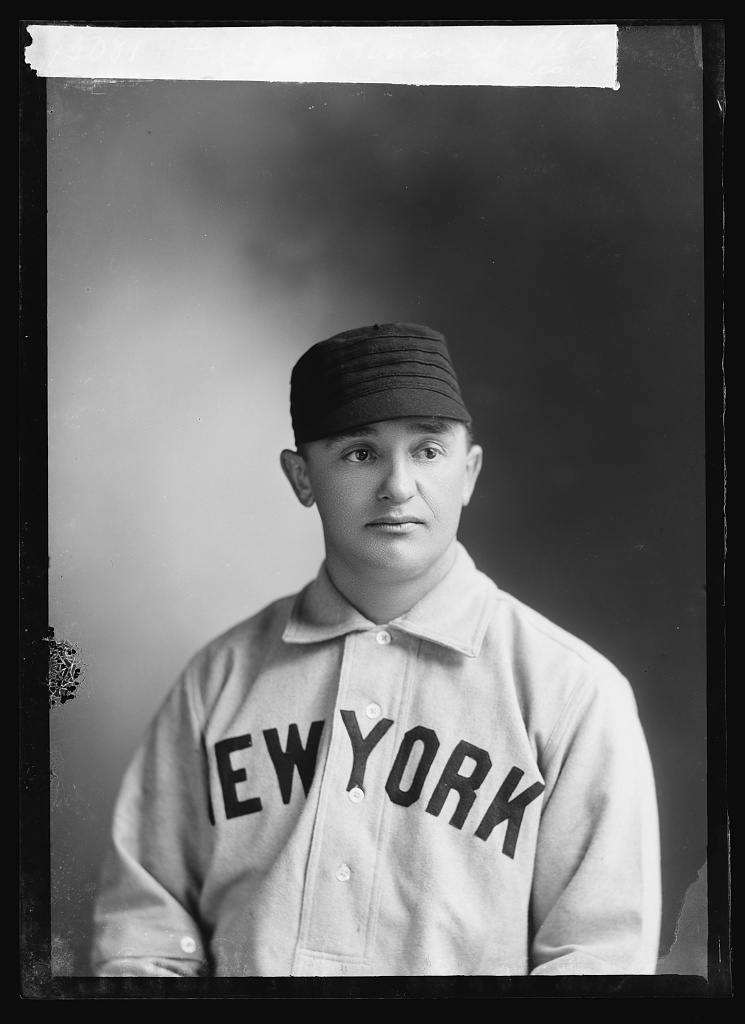
- Hartman in NY Giants uniform
- Third baseman
- Born: April 21, 1868; Allegheny, Pennsylvania, U.S.
- Died: November 11, 1938 (aged 70); McKeesport, Pennsylvania, U.S.
- Batted: Right Threw: Right

MLB debut
- July 26, 1894, for the Pittsburgh Pirates

Last MLB appearance
- September 8, 1902, for the St. Louis Cardinals

MLB statistics
- Batting average: .278
- Home runs: 10
- Runs batted in: 333
- Stats at Baseball Reference

Teams
- Pittsburgh Pirates (1894); St. Louis Browns (1897); New York Giants (1898–1899); Chicago White Sox (1901); St. Louis Cardinals (1902)

Frederick Orin Hartman (April 21, 1868 – November 11, 1938) was an American professional baseball third baseman. He played in Major League Baseball (MLB) for the Pittsburgh Pirates, St. Louis Browns, New York Giants, Chicago White Sox, and St. Louis Cardinals.

In six seasons, Hartman posted a .278 batting average (623-for-2242) with 10 home runs and 333 runs batted in in 582 games played.
