= Pat Crisham =

American baseball player (1877–1915)

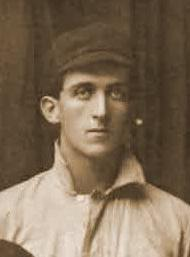
- First baseman / Catcher
- Born: June 4, 1877; Amesbury, Massachusetts, U.S.
- Died: June 4, 1915 (aged 38); Syracuse, New York, U.S.
- Batted: Unknown Threw: Unknown

MLB debut
- May 5, 1899, for the Baltimore Orioles

Last MLB appearance
- October 9, 1899, for the Baltimore Orioles

MLB statistics
- Batting average: .291
- Home runs: 0
- Runs batted in: 20
- Stats at Baseball Reference

Teams
- Baltimore Orioles (1899)

Patrick J. Crisham (June 4, 1877 – June 12, 1915) was an American professional baseball player who played infield in Major League Baseball in 1899. He played for the Baltimore Orioles.
