= Frank Quinn (outfielder) =

American baseball player (1876–1920)

- Outfielder
- Born: August 24, 1876; Sheffield, Pennsylvania, U.S.
- Died: February 2, 1920 (aged 43); Camden, New Jersey, U.S.
- Batted: Unknown Threw: Unknown

MLB debut
- August 9, 1899, for the Chicago Orphans

Last MLB appearance
- October 2, 1899, for the Chicago Orphans

MLB statistics
- Batting average: .176
- Home runs: 0
- Runs batted in: 1
- Stats at Baseball Reference

Teams
- Chicago Orphans (1899)

Franklin Cady Quinn (August 24, 1876 – February 2, 1920) was an American professional baseball player who played outfield in the Major Leagues for the 1899 Chicago Orphans of the National League.

== Sources ==
- Baseball Reference
