= Scott Hardesty =

American baseball player (1870–1944)

- Shortstop
- Born: January 26, 1870; Bellville, Ohio, U.S.
- Died: October 29, 1944 (aged 74); Fostoria, Ohio, U.S.
- Batted: Unknown Threw: Left

MLB debut
- August 17, 1899, for the New York Giants

Last MLB appearance
- September 8, 1899, for the New York Giants

MLB statistics
- Batting average: .222
- Home runs: 0
- Runs batted in: 4
- Stats at Baseball Reference

Teams
- New York Giants (1899)

Scott Durbin Hardesty (January 26, 1870 - October 29, 1944) was an American infielder in Major League Baseball.
