= Danny Green (baseball) =

American baseball player (1876–1914)

- Outfielder
- Born: November 6, 1876; Burlington, New Jersey, U.S.
- Died: November 9, 1914 (aged 38); Camden, New Jersey, U.S.
- Batted: Left Threw: Right

MLB debut
- August 17, 1898, for the Chicago Orphans

Last MLB appearance
- October 8, 1905, for the Chicago White Sox

MLB statistics
- Batting average: .293
- Home runs: 29
- Runs batted in: 423
- Stolen bases: 192
- Stats at Baseball Reference

Teams
- Chicago Orphans (1898–1901); Chicago White Sox (1902–1905)

Edward "Danny" Green (November 6, 1876 – November 9, 1914) was an American professional baseball player. A center fielder/right fielder, he played in Major League Baseball from 1898 through 1905 for the Chicago Orphans (1898–1901) and Chicago White Sox (1902–05). Green batted left-handed and threw right-handed. He was born in Burlington, New Jersey.

In an eight-season career, Green was a .293 hitter (1021-for-3484) with 29 home runs and 423 RBI in 923 games, including 552 runs, 124 doubles, 65 triples and 192 stolen bases.

Green reached the majors in 1898 with the Chicago Orphans (later the Cubs), spending four years with them before moving to the Chicago White Sox. Green became the regular Orphans center fielder in 1898, replacing the moody Bill Lange, who retired at the height of his fame to get married. Green hit .304 for the Orphans during four seasons, including a career-high .313 in 1901. But when the American League owners started to offer lucrative contracts to unsatisfied National League stars, Charles Comiskey landed Green, who became the White Sox right fielder in 1902. In his first two years with the Sox he hit .312 and .309. A fast and smart runner, from 1900 to 1904 he averaged 30.2 stolen bases in each season, with a career-high 35 in 1902. Then, before the 1906 season he suffered a throwing arm injury and was outrighted to the American Association.

Green died in Camden, New Jersey just three days after his 38th birthday. While Green's family always insisted he died of complications from a beaning, the book, Death At the Ballpark reveals Green most likely died from complications of syphilis.

- List of Major League Baseball career stolen bases leaders
