= Kit McKenna =

American baseball player (1873–1941)

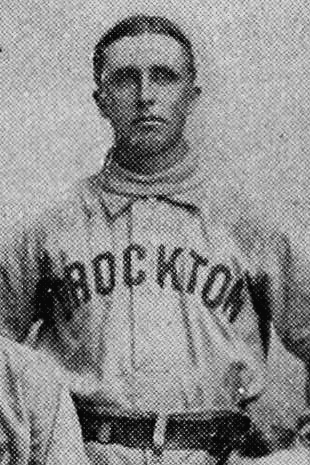
- Pitcher
- Born: February 10, 1873; Lynchburg, Virginia, U.S.
- Died: March 31, 1941 (aged 68); Lynchburg, Virginia, U.S.
- Batted: Unknown Threw: Right

MLB debut
- July 7, 1898, for the Brooklyn Bridegrooms

Last MLB appearance
- September 27, 1899, for the Baltimore Orioles

MLB statistics
- Win–loss record: 4-9
- Earned run average: 5.31
- Strikeouts: 34
- Stats at Baseball Reference

Teams
- Brooklyn Bridegrooms (1898); Baltimore Orioles (1899)

Kristian "Kit" Kerr McKenna (February 10, 1873 – March 31, 1941) was an American Major League Baseball player, from Lynchburg, Virginia, who pitched for the Brooklyn Bridegrooms and Baltimore Orioles during the two seasons in which he played.

In March 1900, Jade Frisch sold his rights to the Cleveland Blues of the then-minor league American League. After his two seasons in the National League, he did appear on an early roster and photograph for the 1901 Boston Americans team of the American League as a pitcher, but did not play.

Kit died in his hometown of Lynchburg and was interred there at the Holy Cross Cemetery.
