= Jack Rothfuss =

American baseball player (1872–1947)

- First baseman
- Born: April 18, 1872; Newark, New Jersey, U.S.
- Died: April 20, 1947 (aged 75); Basking Ridge, New Jersey, U.S.
- Batted: Right Threw: Right

MLB debut
- August 2, 1897, for the Pittsburgh Pirates

Last MLB appearance
- September 25, 1897, for the Pittsburgh Pirates

MLB statistics
- Batting average: .313
- Home runs: 2
- Runs batted in: 18
- Stats at Baseball Reference

Teams
- Pittsburgh Pirates (1897)

John Albert Rothfuss (April 18, 1872 – April 20, 1947) was a professional baseball first baseman. He played 35 games in Major League Baseball for the Pittsburgh Pirates. Rothfuss was 5 feet, 11 inches tall and weighed 195 pounds.

== Baseball career ==
Rothfuss started his professional baseball career in 1896 with the Atlantic League's Newark Colts. That season, he was one of the best hitters in the league, leading the circuit with 26 triples, 13 home runs, and 87 stolen bases. His batting average of .351 would end up being his career-high.

Rothfuss continued his good play in 1897. He had batted .323 through 89 games when his release was bought by the Pittsburgh Pirates for $2,000 in July. According to one Newark, New Jersey, sportswriter:

No more popular player ever left Newark than our "Jack" and the National League scores will be eagerly scanned daily to note his work. With a little experienced coaching at the bat he should be a fixture, as he is fast in every other department of the game.

Rothfuss made his major league debut on August 2, 1897. He batted .313 during the season's final two months and earned a job as the Pirates' starting first baseman. On August 22, the Newark Sunday Call wrote, "National League papers are unanimous in the opinion that 'Jack' Rothfuss is one of the 'comers' of the big league. Some of them say Newark should feel proud of him. Well, she does."

However, Rothfuss never played in the majors after 1897. He had contracted dysentery late in the season. The following March, Sporting Life reported that "'Jack' has not been himself all winter. He says the water in Pittsburgh is atrocious." In April 1898, Rothfuss' contract was sold to the Western League's Kansas City Blues. He was still suffering from dysentery in May, and in early June, a sportswriter in Kansas City wrote:

Johnny Rothfuss ... has shown himself to be the worst type of ingrate. He was sick when he came in the spring, and he was placed in the care of physicians at an expense of $175 per month. As soon as the Blues left for the East and Rothfuss was pronounced cured by his physicians he took French leave and nothing has been heard from him since. The United States Government is warned against accepting this man Rothfuss as a volunteer, for he has certainly shown himself to be the rankest kind of a deserter in the face of duty.

Rothfuss had returned to Newark in late May, and he played for semi-professional teams in New Jersey later that summer.

Rothfuss did join the Kansas City team in 1899. He then played one season in the Eastern League, batting .218 there, and one season in the Western Association, batting .305. He went back to Kansas City for 1902 to play for the Blues of the American Association. In three seasons with the Blues, he batted .309, .285, and .214.

In 1905, Rothfuss played for the Eastern League's Rochester Bronchos. He batted .240 in 27 games, and when Rochester tried to send him to a club in Savannah, Georgia, Rothfuss jumped the team. He played 19 games in the independent Tri-State League in 1906 before applying to the National Board for reinstatement in early 1907. Rothfuss finished his professional baseball career that year with the Connecticut State League's Hartford Senators.

== Personal life ==
Rothfuss was born in Newark, New Jersey, in 1872. His brother, Adam Rothfuss, was also a baseball player, and the two were teammates on the Newark Colts in 1896 and 1897. While playing for the Pirates in 1897, Jack Rothfuss became the father of a baby boy.

Rothfuss died in Basking Ridge, New Jersey, in 1947.
