= Frank McPartlin =

American baseball player (1872–1943)

- Pitcher
- Born: February 16, 1872; Hoosick Falls, New York, U.S.
- Died: November 13, 1943 (aged 71); New York City, U.S.
- Batted: Unknown Threw: Left

MLB debut
- August 22, 1899, for the New York Giants

Last MLB appearance
- August 22, 1899, for the New York Giants

MLB statistics
- Win–loss record: 0–0
- Earned run average: 4.50
- Strikeouts: 2
- Stats at Baseball Reference

Teams
- New York Giants (1899)

Frank McPartlin (February 16, 1872 – November 13, 1943) was an American professional baseball player. He played for the New York Giants of the National League in one game on August 22, 1899. He pitched four innings, allowing four runs, two of which were earned. His minor league career stretched from 1894 to 1910.
