= John Malarkey =

American baseball player (1872–1949)

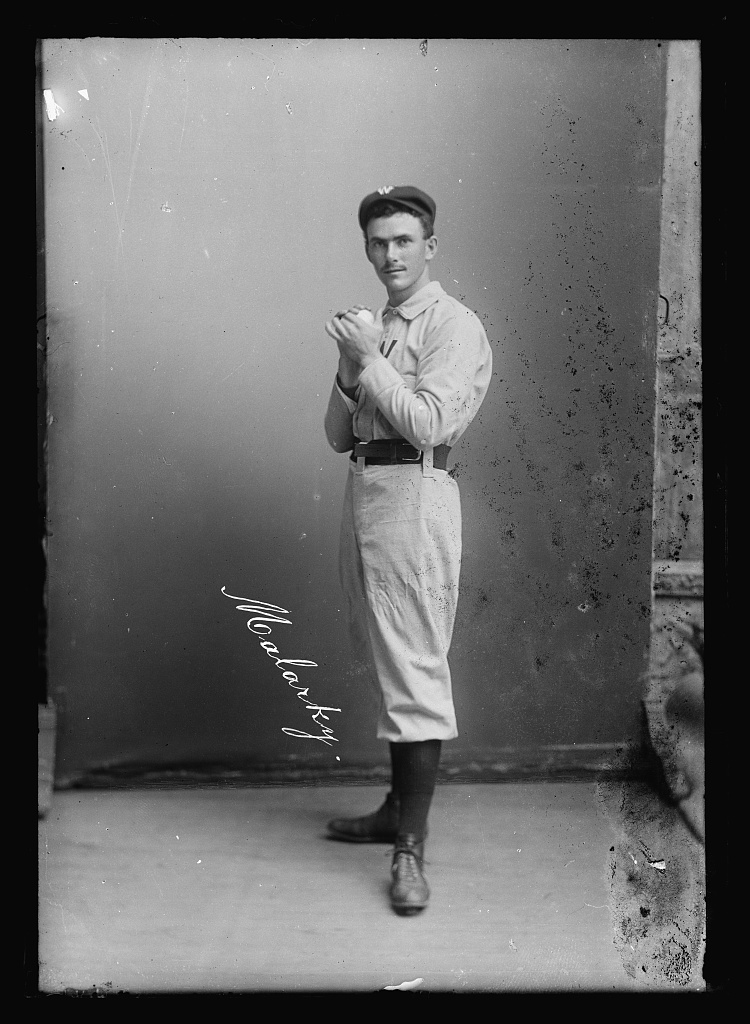
- Malarkey in Washington Senator uniform
- Pitcher
- Born: May 4, 1872; Springfield, Ohio, U.S.
- Died: October 29, 1949 (aged 77); Cincinnati, Ohio, U.S.
- Batted: Right Threw: Right

MLB debut
- September 21, 1894, for the Washington Senators

Last MLB appearance
- September 20, 1903, for the Boston Beaneaters

MLB statistics
- Win–loss record: 21–37
- Earned run average: 3.64
- Strikeouts: 179
- Stats at Baseball Reference

Teams
- Washington Senators (1894–1896); Chicago Orphans (1899); Boston Beaneaters (1902–1903)

John S. Malarkey (May 4, 1872 – October 29, 1949) was a 19th-century American right handed pitcher in Major League Baseball who played for the Washington Senators, Chicago Orphans and Boston Beaneaters in a span of six seasons from 1894 to 1903.

Malarkey entered the records books when he became the only pitcher to date in major league history to earn a victory by hitting his own walk-off home run. On September 10, 1902, Malarkey hit a solo shot against St. Louis Cardinals pitcher Mike O'Neill in the bottom of the 11th inning to give the Beaneaters a 4–3 victory in the second game of a doubleheader at Boston's South End Grounds.

In that season, Malarkey ranked fourth on the Boston pitching with his eight wins. Besides, he posted a strong 2.59 earned run average and was one of only four ERA qualifiers in the majors who did not surrender a single home run, being the others Ed Siever of the Detroit Tigers and Ed Doheny and Jesse Tannehill, both of the Pittsburgh Pirates.

In between, Malarkey spent all or part of 10 seasons in the minors from 1896 to 1908, winning 20 or more games five times.

After his baseball days, Malarkey worked for the Erie Railroad and lived in Marion, Ohio. He later moved to Cincinnati, Ohio, where he died in 1949 of pneumonia at the age of 77.
