= Doc Curley =

American baseball player (1874–1920)

- Second baseman
- Born: March 12, 1874; Upton, Massachusetts, U.S.
- Died: September 23, 1920 (aged 46); Worcester, Massachusetts, U.S.
- Batted: Right Threw: Right

MLB debut
- September 12, 1899, for the Chicago Orphans

Last MLB appearance
- September 22, 1899, for the Chicago Orphans

MLB statistics
- Batting average: .108
- Home runs: 0
- Runs batted in: 2
- Stats at Baseball Reference

Teams
- Chicago Orphans (1899)

Walter James Curley (March 12, 1874 – September 23, 1920) was an American professional baseball player who played second base in the Major Leagues for the 1899 Chicago Orphans of the National League. He went to college at College of the Holy Cross, the University of Massachusetts Amherst and the University of Virginia.

== Sources ==
- Baseball Reference
