= Youngy Johnson =

American baseball player (1873–1936)

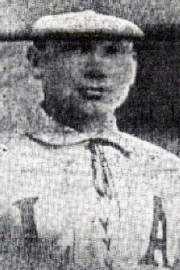
- Pitcher
- Born: July 22, 1873; San Francisco, California, U.S.
- Died: August 28, 1936 (aged 63); Berkeley, California, U.S.
- Batted: Unknown Threw: Right

MLB debut
- April 29, 1897, for the Philadelphia Phillies

Last MLB appearance
- September 16, 1899, for the New York Giants

MLB statistics
- Win–loss record: 1–2
- Earned run average: 4.35
- Strikeouts: 8
- Stats at Baseball Reference

Teams
- Philadelphia Phillies (1897); New York Giants (1899)

John Gottfred "Youngy" Johnson (July 22, 1873 in San Francisco – August 28, 1936 in Berkeley, California) was an American baseball player. He played in the National League with the Philadelphia Phillies and the New York Giants. He played his first game on April 29, 1897.
