= Jack Katoll =

German-American baseball player (1875–1955)

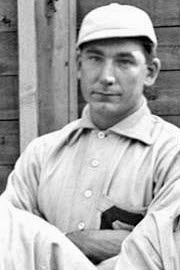
- Pitcher
- Born: June 24, 1875; Finckenstein, Prussia
- Died: June 18, 1955 (aged 79); Woodstock, Illinois, U.S.
- Batted: Left Threw: Right

MLB debut
- September 9, 1898, for the Chicago Orphans

Last MLB appearance
- September 29, 1902, for the Baltimore Orioles

MLB statistics
- Win–loss record: 17–22
- Earned run average: 3.32
- Strikeouts: 90
- Stats at Baseball Reference

Teams
- Chicago Orphans (1898–1899); Chicago White Sox (1901–1902); Baltimore Orioles (1902)

Johann "Jack" Katoll (June 24, 1875 – June 18, 1955) was a professional baseball pitcher who played in the Major Leagues from 1898 to 1902. He would play for the Chicago Orphans, Chicago White Sox, and Baltimore Orioles.
