= Charlie Gettig =

American baseball player (1870–1935)

Charles Henry Gettig
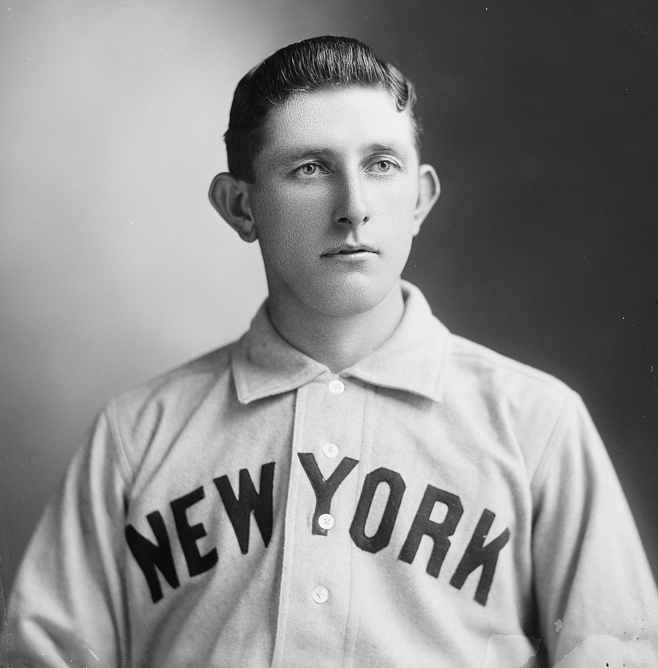
- Gettig in 1896
- Pitcher
- Born: December 1, 1870; Baltimore, Maryland
- Died: April 11, 1935 (aged 64); Baltimore, Maryland
- Batted: Right Threw: Unknown

MLB debut
- August 5, 1896, for the New York Giants

Last MLB appearance
- October 14, 1899, for the New York Giants

MLB statistics
- Win–loss record: 15–12
- Earned run average: 4.50
- Strikeouts: 51
- Stats at Baseball Reference

Teams
- New York Giants (1896–1899)

Charles Henry Gettig (December 1, 1870 – April 11, 1935) was an American professional baseball player who played four Major league seasons between 1896 and 1899. He was born in Baltimore, Maryland and died there at the age of 64.
