= New York Giants (baseball) =

Professional baseball team in Manhattan, New York, 1883–1957

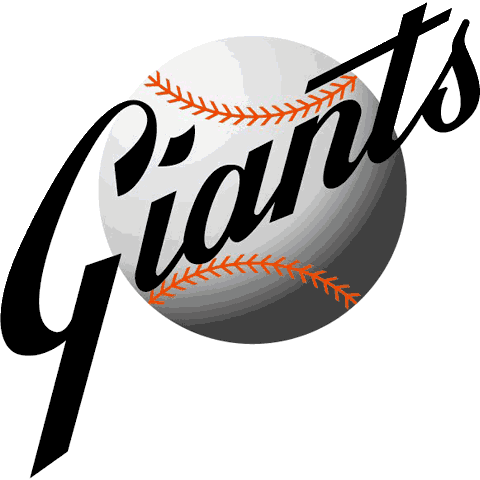

Logo	Cap insignia

Information
- League: National League (1883–1957)
- Ballpark: Polo Grounds III (1891–1957)
- Established: 1883; 143 years ago
- Relocated: 1958; 68 years ago (to San Francisco; became the San Francisco Giants)
- Nicknames: The Jints; The Orange and Black; The Baseball Giants (1925-57)
- World Series championships: 5: 1905; 1921; 1922; 1933; 1954
- Pre-modern World Series championships: 2: 1888; 1889
- National League pennant: 17: 1888; 1889; 1904; 1905; 1911; 1912; 1913; 1917; 1921; 1922; 1923; 1924; 1933; 1936; 1937; 1951; 1954
- Temple Cup: 1: 1894
- Former name: New York Gothams (1883–1884)
- Former ballparks: Hilltop Park (1911); Polo Grounds II (1889–1890); St. George Cricket Grounds (1889); Oakland Park (1889); Polo Grounds I (1883–1888)
- Colors: Black, orange, white
- Retired numbers: NY; NY; 3; 4; 11; 20; 24
- Ownership: List of owners: John B. Day (1883–1893); Cornelius Van Cott (1893–1895); Andrew Freedman (1895–1902); John T. Brush (1902–1912); Harry Hempstead (1912–1919); Charles Stoneham (1919–1936); Horace Stoneham (1936–1957)
- General manager: Chub Feeney (1950–1957)
- Manager: List of managers: John Clapp (1883); Jim Price (1884); John Montgomery Ward (1884); Jim Mutrie (1885–1891); Patrick T. Powers (1892); John Montgomery Ward (1893–1894); George Davis (1895); Jack Doyle (1895); Harvey Watkins (1895); Arthur Irwin (1896); Bill Joyce (1896–1898); Cap Anson (1898); John B. Day (1899); Fred Hoey (1899); Buck Ewing (1900); George Davis (1900–1901); Horace Fogel (1902); Heinie Smith (1902); John McGraw (1902–1924); Hughie Jennings (1924); John McGraw (1925); Hughie Jennings (1925); John McGraw (1926–1927); Rogers Hornsby (1927); John McGraw (1928–1932); Bill Terry (1932–1941); Mel Ott (1942–1948); Leo Durocher (1948–1955); Bill Rigney (1956–1957)

The New York Giants were a Major League Baseball team in the National League that began play in the 1883 season as the New York Gothams (Note: A study published by the Society for American Baseball Research suggests that the team had no nickname when they entered the league and were not known as the "Gothams" or any other nickname before the "Giants" nickname became popular in 1885.) and became known as the Giants in 1885. They continued as the New York Giants until the team moved to San Francisco after the 1957 season, where the team continues its history as the San Francisco Giants. The team moved west at the same time as its longtime rival, the Brooklyn Dodgers, also in the National League, moved to Los Angeles in Southern California as the Los Angeles Dodgers, continuing the National League, same-state rivalry.

During most of their 75 seasons in New York City, the Giants played home games at various incarnations of the Polo Grounds in Upper Manhattan. Numerous inductees of the National Baseball Hall of Fame and Museum played for the New York Giants, including Christy Mathewson (a member of the Hall of Fame's inaugural class), John McGraw, Mel Ott, Bill Terry, Willie Mays, Monte Irvin, Frankie Frisch, Ross Youngs and Travis Jackson. During the club's tenure in New York, it won five of the franchise's eight World Series championships and 17 of its 23 National League pennants. Famous moments in the Giants' New York history include the 1922 World Series, in which the Giants swept the Yankees in four games, Bobby Thomson's 1951 home run known as the "Shot Heard 'Round the World", and the defensive feat by Willie Mays during the first game of the 1954 World Series known as "the Catch".

The Giants had intense rivalries with their fellow New York teams the New York Yankees and the Brooklyn Dodgers, facing the Yankees in six World Series and playing the league rival Dodgers multiple times per season. Games between any two of these three teams were known collectively as the Subway Series.

The New York Giants of the National Football League were named after the team; to distinguish the two clubs, the football team was legally incorporated as the New York Football Giants, which remains its corporate name to this day.

The New York Giants had an overall win–loss record of 6,067–4,898–157 (.553) during their 74 years in New York. Nineteen former New York Giants players were elected to the National Baseball Hall of Fame.

== History ==
=== Early days ===
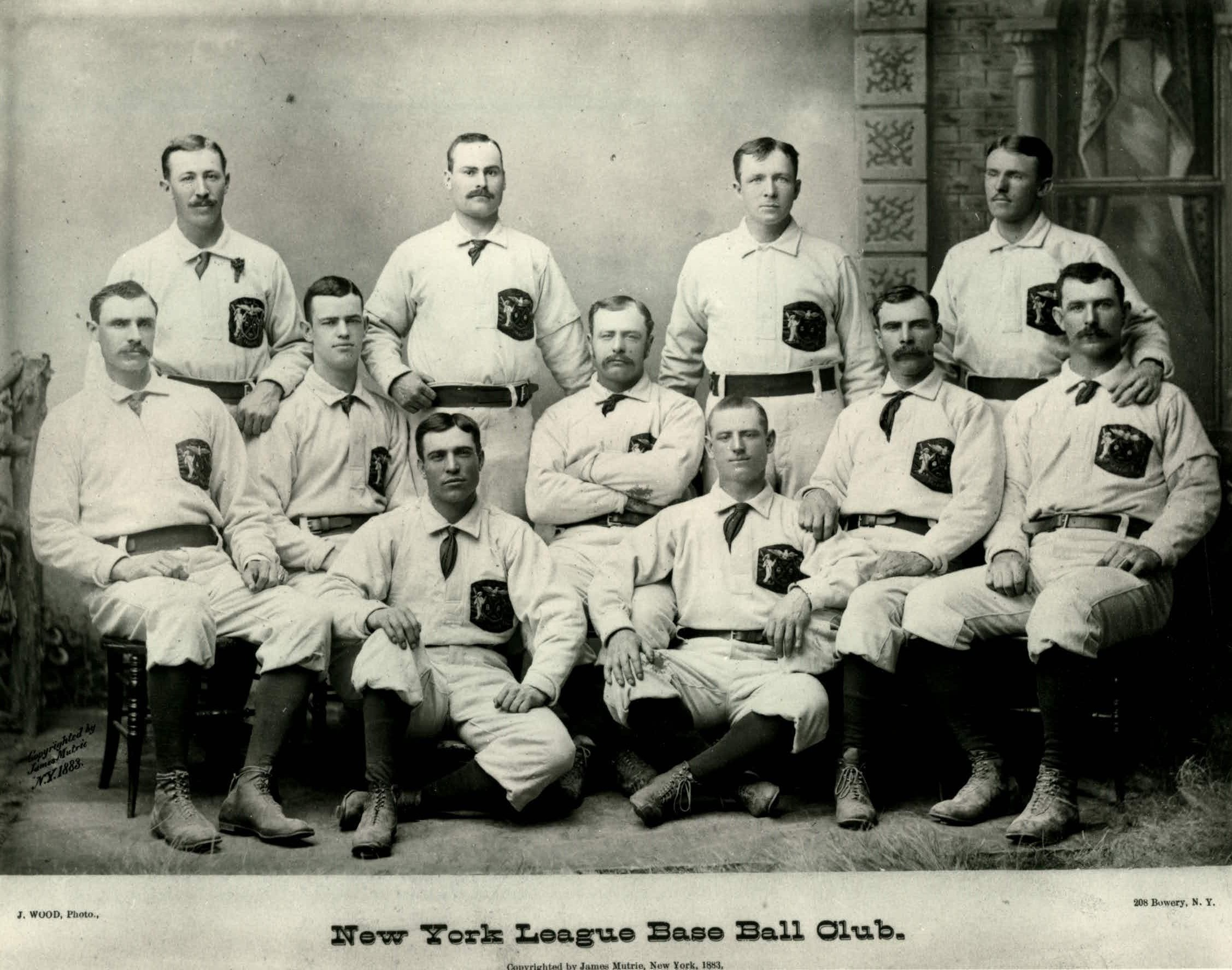
The 1883 New York Gothams

The Giants began as the second baseball club founded by millionaire tobacconist John B. Day and veteran amateur baseball player Jim Mutrie. The Gothams, as the Giants were originally known, entered the National League seven years after its 1876 formation, in 1883, while their other club, the Metropolitans played in the rival American Association (1882–1891). Nearly half of the original Gothams players were members of the disbanded Troy Trojans in upstate New York, whose place in the National League the Gothams inherited. While the Metropolitans were initially the more successful club, after they won the 1884 AA championship, Day and Mutrie began moving star players to the NL Gothams, whose fortunes improved while the Metropolitans' afterwards slumped.

It is said that after one particularly satisfying victory over the Philadelphia Phillies, Mutrie (who was also the team's manager) stormed into the dressing room and exclaimed, "My big fellows! My giants!" From then on (1885), the club was known as the Giants. However, more recent research has suggested that the New York World was already widely using the Giants nickname throughout the 1885 season, before the legendary game was played.

The team won its first National League pennant in 1888, as well as a victory over the St. Louis Browns in an early incarnation of the pre-modern-era World Series. They repeated as champions the next year with a pennant and world championship victory over Brooklyn.

The Giants' original home stadium, the Polo Grounds, also dates from this early era. It had been built in 1876 as a pitch for playing polo, and was located north of Central Park adjacent to Fifth and Sixth Avenues and 110th and 112th Streets, in Harlem in upper Manhattan. After their eviction from that first incarnation of the Polo Grounds after the 1888 season, they moved further uptown to various fields which they also named the "Polo Grounds" located between 155th and 159th Streets in Harlem and Washington Heights, playing at the famous Washington Heights location at the foot of Coogan's Bluff until the end of the 1957 season, when they moved to San Francisco.

The Giants were a powerhouse in the late 1880s, winning their first two National League Pennants and World Championships in 1888 and 1889. But nearly all of the Giants' stars jumped to the upstart newly organized rival loop, the Players' League, whose New York franchise was also named the Giants, in 1890. The new team even built a stadium next door to the NL Polo Grounds. With a decimated roster, the NL Giants finished a distant sixth. Attendance took a nosedive, and the financial strain affected Day's tobacco business as well. The Players' League dissolved after the single season, and Day sold a minority interest in his NL Giants to the defunct PL Giants' principal backer, Edward Talcott. As a condition of the sale, Day had to fire Mutrie as manager. Although the Giants rebounded to third place in 1891, Day was forced to sell a controlling interest to Talcott at the end of the '91 season.

In 1894, the Giants, as runner-up in the National League, took part in the 1894 Temple Cup championship series against the Baltimore Orioles, sweeping in four games and winning the first Temple Cup.

Four years later, Talcott sold the Giants to Andrew Freedman, a real estate developer with ties to the Tammany Hall, the political machine of the Democratic Party that ran New York City. Freedman was one of the most detested owners in baseball history, getting into heated disputes with other owners, writers and his own players, most famously with star pitcher Amos Rusie, author of the first Giants no-hitter. When Freedman offered Rusie only $2,500 for 1896, the disgruntled hurler sat out the entire season. Attendance fell off throughout the league without Rusie, prompting the other owners to chip in $50,000 to get him to return for 1897. Freedman even hired former owner Day as manager for part of the 1899 season.

==== The John McGraw era ====
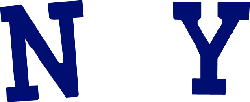
Primary logo, 1904–1907.

In 1902, after a series of disastrous moves that left the Giants 53 1/2 games behind the front-runner, Freedman signed John McGraw as player-manager, convincing him to jump in mid-season from the Baltimore Orioles (1901–1902) of the fledgling American League and bring with him several of his teammates. McGraw went on to manage the Giants for three decades until 1932, one of the longest and most successful tenures in professional sports. Hiring "Mr. McGraw", as his players referred to him, was one of Freedman's last significant moves as owner of the Giants, since after that 1902 season he was forced to sell his interest in the club to John T. Brush. McGraw went on to manage the Giants to nine National League pennants (in 1904, 1905, and every year from 1911 to 1913) and three World Series championships (in 1905, 1921, and 1922), with a tenth pennant and fourth world championship as Giants owner in 1933 under his handpicked player-manager successor, Bill Terry.

The Giants already had their share of stars beginning in the 1880s and 1890s, such as "Smiling" Mickey Welch, Roger Connor, Tim Keefe, Jim O'Rourke, and John Montgomery Ward, the player-lawyer who formed the renegade Players' League in 1890 to protest unfair player contracts. McGraw, a veteran of the infamous 1890s Baltimore Orioles, in his three decades managing the Giants, McGraw managed star players including Christy Mathewson, "Iron Man" Joe McGinnity, Jim Thorpe, Red Ames, Casey Stengel, Art Nehf, Edd Roush, Rogers Hornsby, Bill Terry and Mel Ott.

The Giants under McGraw famously snubbed their first modern World Series chance in 1904 by refusing the invitation to play the reigning world champion Boston Americans (Red Sox) because McGraw considered the newly established American League of 1901 as little more than a minor league and disliked its firebrand president Ban Johnson. He also resented his Giants' new intra-city rival New York Highlanders, who almost won the pennant but lost to Boston on the last day, and stuck by his refusal to play whoever won the 1904 AL pennant.

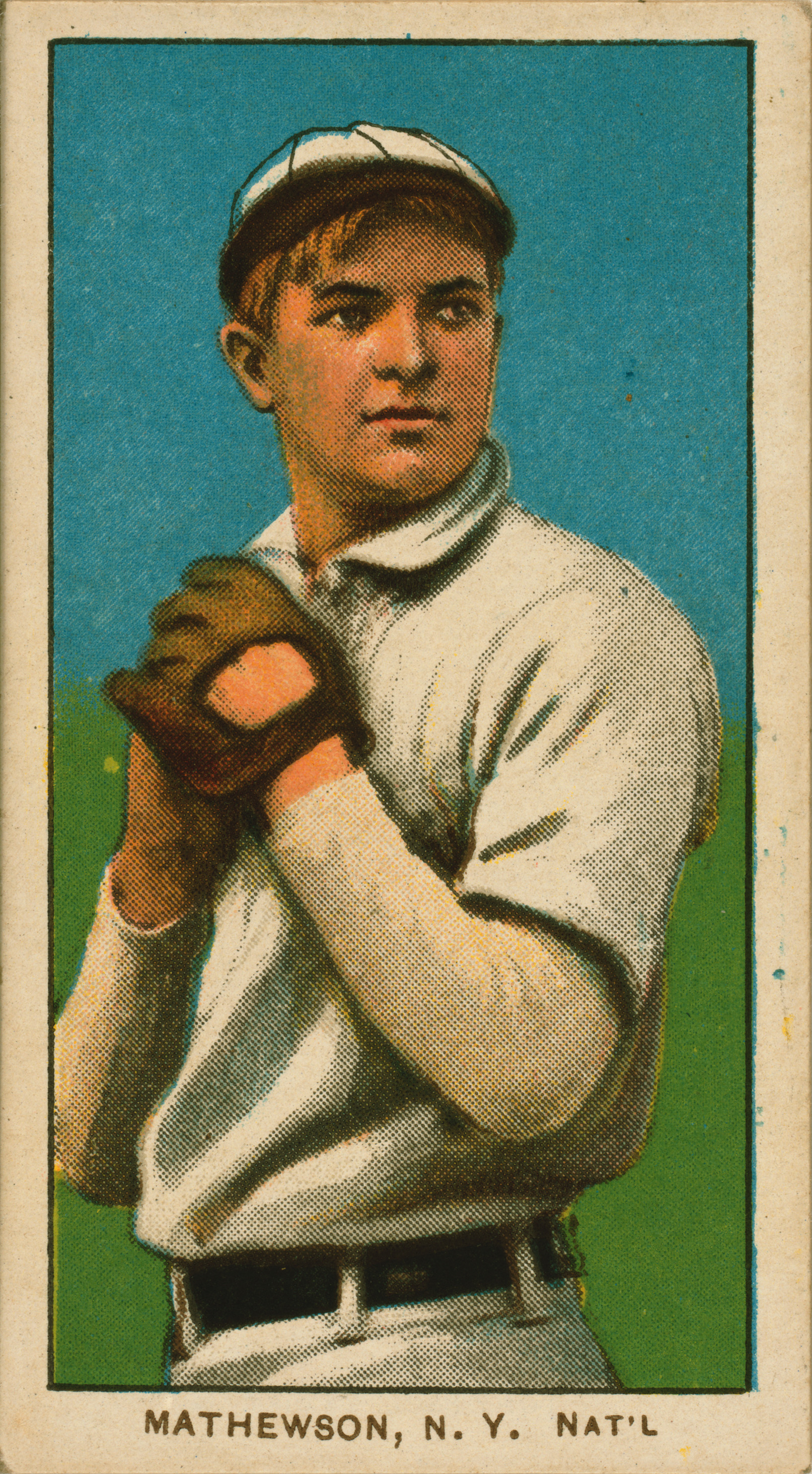
Hall of Fame pitcher Christy Mathewson

The ensuing criticism resulted in Brush's taking the lead to formalize the rules and format of the World Series. The Giants won the 1905 World Series over Connie Mack's Philadelphia Athletics, with Christy Mathewson nearly winning the series single-handedly with a still-standing record three complete-game shutouts and 27 consecutive scoreless innings in that one World Series.

The Giants then had several frustrating years. In 1908, they finished in a tie with the Chicago Cubs due to a late-season home tie game with the Cubs resulting from the Fred Merkle baserunning "boner". They lost the postseason replay of the tie game (ordered by NL president Harry Pulliam) to the Cubs (after disgruntled Giants fans had set fire to the stands the morning of the game), who would go on to win their second (consecutive, and their last for the next 108 years) World Series. That post-season game was further darkened by a story that someone on the Giants had attempted to bribe umpire Bill Klem. This could have been a disastrous scandal for baseball, but because Klem was honest and the Giants lost the duel between Christy Mathewson and Mordecai "Three-Fingered" Brown 4–2, it faded over time.

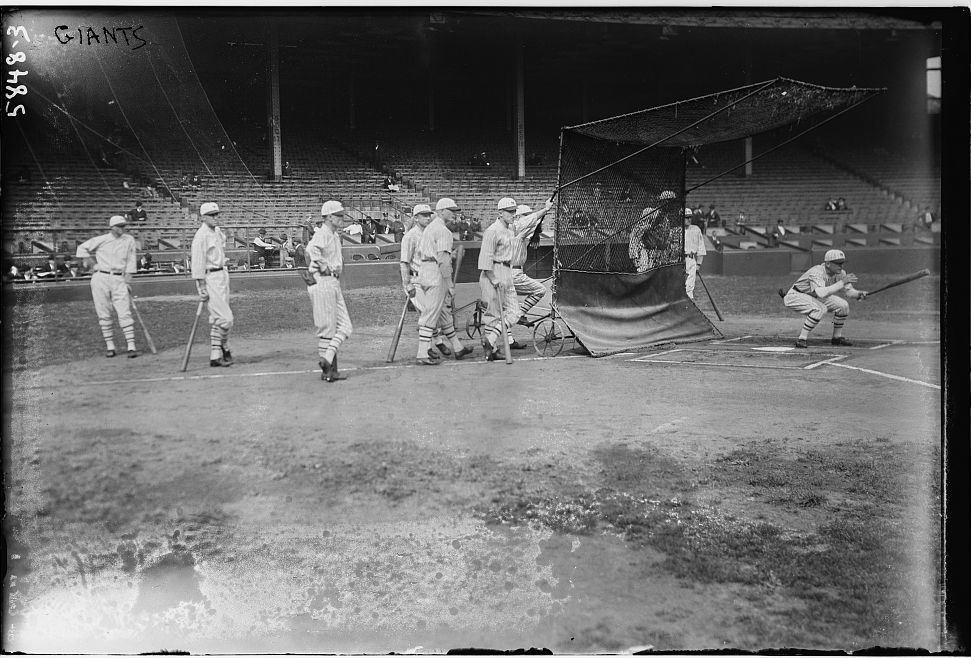
The Giants at the batting cage in 1923

The Giants experienced a mixture of success and hard luck in the early 1910s, losing three straight World Series in 1911–1913 to the A's, Red Sox and A's again (two seasons later, both the Giants and the A's, decimated by the short-lived rival third loop, the Federal League of 1914–1915, with the "jumping ship" signings of many of their stars, finished in last place). After losing the 1917 Series to the Chicago White Sox (the last World Series win for the White Sox until 2005), the Giants played in four straight World Series in the early 1920s, winning the first two over their Polo Grounds tenants, the Yankees, who had won the first two of their many pennants, led by their new young slugger Babe Ruth, then losing to the Yankees in 1923 after the original Yankee Stadium had opened that May. They also lost in 1924, when the Washington Senators won their only World Series while in D.C. From 1923 to 1927, the team held their spring training at Payne Park in Sarasota, Florida.

Primary logo, 1913–1914, 1916

Cap logo, 1917–1922, 1928–1929

Cap logo, 1923–1927, 1930–1932

Cap logo, 1933–1935, 1947–1948

Cap logo, 1936–1939

Cap logo, 1940–1946

From 1908 through 1948, the Giants used the same interlocking "NY" shape using various colors schemes.

=== 1930–1957: Five pennants in 28 seasons ===
McGraw handed over the team to Bill Terry midway through the 1932 season. Terry served as manager for nine-and-a-half years, serving as player-manager until 1936. Under Terry, the Giants won three pennants, defeating the Senators in the 1933 World Series but swept by the Yankees in consecutive fall classics, 1936 and 1937. Aside from Terry himself, the other stars of the era were slugger Mel Ott and southpaw hurler Carl Hubbell. Known as "King Carl" and "The Meal Ticket", Hubbell gained fame in the first two innings of the 1934 All-Star Game (played at the Polo Grounds) by striking out five future AL Hall of Famers in a row: Babe Ruth, Lou Gehrig, Jimmie Foxx, Al Simmons and Joe Cronin.

Ott succeeded Terry as manager in 1942, but the war years proved to be difficult for the Giants. Midway during the 1948 season Brooklyn Dodgers manager Leo Durocher left as Dodgers skipper to manage the Giants, not without controversy. Not only was such a midseason managerial switch unprecedented, but Durocher had been accused of gambling in 1947 and subsequently suspended for that whole season by Baseball Commissioner Albert "Happy" Chandler. Durocher's ensuing eight full seasons managing the Giants proved some of the most memorable for their fans, particularly because of the arrival of five-tool superstar Willie Mays, their two pennants in 1951 and 1954, their unexpected sweep of the powerful (111–43) Cleveland Indians in the 1954 World Series and arguably the two most famous plays in Giants history.

==== 1951: The "Shot Heard 'Round the World" ====
The "Shot Heard 'Round the World," or Bobby Thomson's come-from-behind ninth-inning walk-off home run that won the National League pennant for the Giants over their bitter rivals, the Brooklyn Dodgers, in the deciding game of a three-game playoff series ended one of baseball's most memorable pennant races. The Giants had been 13 1/2 games behind the league-leading Dodgers in August, but under Durocher's guidance and with a 16-game winning streak, got hot and caught the Dodgers to tie for the lead on the next-to-last day of the season.

==== Mays's catch and the 1954 Series ====
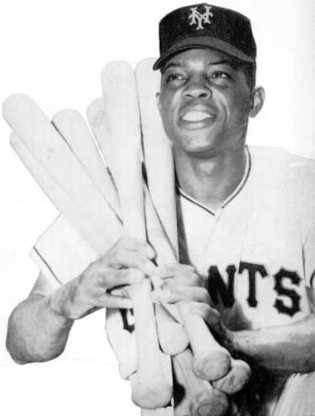
Willie Mays in 1954

In Game 1 of the 1954 World Series at the Polo Grounds against the Cleveland Indians, Willie Mays made "The Catch," a dramatic over-the-shoulder catch of a fly ball by Vic Wertz after sprinting with his back to the plate on a dead run to deepest center field. At the time the game was tied 2–2 in the eighth inning, with men on first and second and nobody out. Mays caught the ball 450 ft (140 m) from the plate, whirled and threw the ball to the infield, keeping the lead runner, Larry Doby, from scoring. Doby advanced to third on the play, and then new pitcher Marv Grissom walked Dale Mitchell to load the bases. Grissom then struck out Dave Pope looking and got Jim Hegan to fly out to left fielder Monte Irvin to end the inning.

Grissom got out of another jam in the ninth when 1953 AL MVP Al Rosen flew out to Irvin with two outs and two on.

In the tenth, Grissom faced more trouble, but got Hall of Fame pitcher Bob Lemon to line out with runners on the corners and 2 outs, preserving the tie game.

In the bottom of the tenth, Willie Mays drew a 1 out walk and stole second base, thus prompting Lemon to intentionally walk Hank Thompson. And with runners on first and second with one out, pinch hitter Dusty Rhodes hit a walk off home run that just squeaked over the right field wall at an estimated 260 feet (79 m).

The underdog Giants went on to sweep the series in four straight, despite the Indians' American League 111–43 regular season. The 1954 World Series title would be their last appearance in the World Series as the New York Giants, with the team moving to San Francisco to start the 1958 season.

==== New York Giants of the 1950s ====
Cap logo featuring a different serif design, 1949–1957.

In addition to Bobby Thomson and Willie Mays, other memorable New York Giants of the 1950s include Hall of Fame manager Leo Durocher, coach Herman Franks, Hall of Fame outfielder Monte Irvin, outfielder and runner-up for the 1954 NL batting championship (won by Willie Mays) Don Mueller, Hall of Fame knuckleball relief pitcher Hoyt Wilhelm, starting pitchers Larry Jansen, Sal Maglie, Jim Hearn, Marv Grissom, Dave Koslo, Don Liddle, Max Lanier, Rubén Gómez, Al Worthington, and Johnny Antonelli, catcher Wes Westrum, catchers Ray Katt and Sal Yvars, shortstop Alvin Dark, third baseman Hank Thompson, first baseman Whitey Lockman, second basemen Davey Williams and Eddie Stanky, outfielder-pitcher Clint Hartung and utility men Johnny Mize, Bill Rigney, Daryl Spencer, Bobby Hofman, Joey Amalfitano, Tookie Gilbert, and 1954 Series hero Dusty Rhodes, among others. In the late 1950s and after the move to San Francisco two Hall of Fame first basemen, Orlando Cepeda and Willie McCovey, joined the team.

==== 1957: Move to California ====
The Giants' final three years in New York City were unmemorable. They stumbled to third place the year after their World Series win, and attendance fell off precipitously. Even before then, the Polo Grounds had become an albatross around the team. It had not been well maintained since the 1940s, and any renovations would have been hindered by the fact that the Giants did not own the parcel of land on which it stood. The Polo Grounds had almost no parking, and the neighborhood around it had become less desirable.

While seeking a new stadium to replace the crumbling Polo Grounds, the Giants began to contemplate a move from New York, initially considering Metropolitan Stadium in Bloomington, Minnesota, which was home to their top farm team, the Minneapolis Millers. Under the rules of the time, the Giants' ownership of the Millers gave them priority rights to a major league team in the area (the Senators wound up there as the Minnesota Twins in 1961).

At this time, the Giants were approached by San Francisco mayor George Christopher. Despite objections from shareholders such as Joan Whitney Payson, majority owner Horace Stoneham entered into negotiations with San Francisco officials around the same time the Dodgers' owner Walter O'Malley was courting the city of Los Angeles. O'Malley had been told that the Dodgers would not be allowed to move to Los Angeles unless a second team moved to California as well. He pushed Stoneham toward moving, and so in the summer of 1957 both the Giants and Brooklyn Dodgers announced their moves to California, ending the three-team golden age of baseball in New York City.

New York would remain a one-team town with the New York Yankees until 1962, when former Giants minority owner Joan Whitney Payson founded the New York Mets and brought National League baseball back to the city (as part of MLB's first wave of expansion). Mets chairman M. Donald Grant had represented Payson on the Giants board, and as such had been the only board member to vote against the Giants' move to California. The "NY" script on the Giants' caps and the orange trim on their uniforms, along with the blue background used by the Dodgers, would be adopted by the Mets, honoring their New York NL forebears with a blend of Giants orange and Dodgers blue.

== Rivalries ==
=== Brooklyn Dodgers ===
The historic and heated rivalry between the Giants and the Dodgers is more than a century old. It began when the Giants and Brooklyn Bridegrooms (later known as the Dodgers) faced each other in the 1889 World Series, the ancestor of the Subway Series, and both played in separate, neighboring cities (New York and Brooklyn were separate cities until 1898, when they became neighboring boroughs of the newly expanded New York City). When both franchises moved to California after the 1957 season, the rivalry was easily transplanted, as the cities of San Francisco and Los Angeles have long been economic, political, and cultural rivals, representative of the broader Northern/Southern California divide.

=== New York Yankees ===
Though in different leagues, the Giants were historical rivals of the Yankees because both teams were based in New York and shared the Polo Grounds. They also met each other six times in the World Series, including their first three (1921–1923) in a row. The Yankees are 4–2 against the New York Giants, with the Giants winning the 1921 and 1922 World Series back-to-back. However, from 1923, when the Yankees moved to the Bronx, to their last meeting in 1951, the Yankees won every World Series against the Giants.

Since the Giants moved to San Francisco in 1958, they have only met the Yankees in a World Series once, in 1962, which the Yankees won 4–3.

In his July 4, 1939, farewell speech ending with the renowned "Today, I consider myself the luckiest man on the face of the earth", Yankee slugger Lou Gehrig, who played in 2,130 consecutive games, declared that the Giants were a team he "would give his right arm to beat, and vice versa".

== Baseball Hall of Famers ==
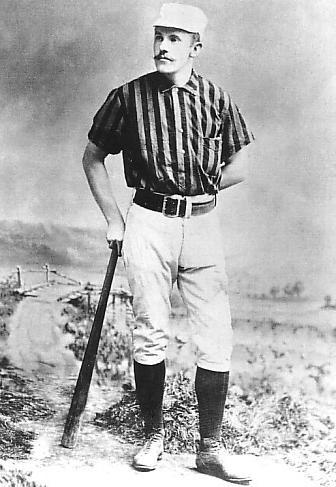
John Montgomery Ward

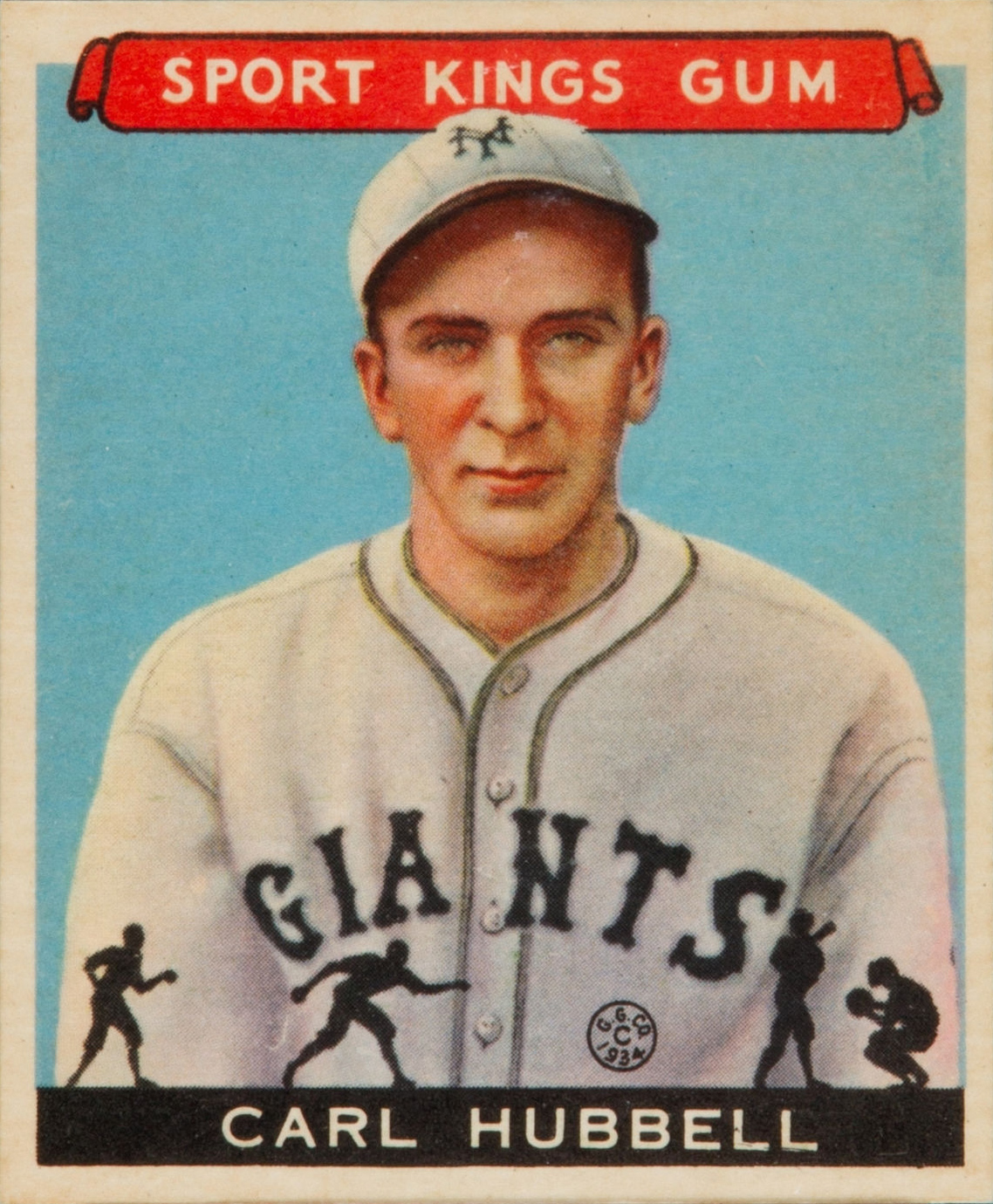
Carl Hubbell

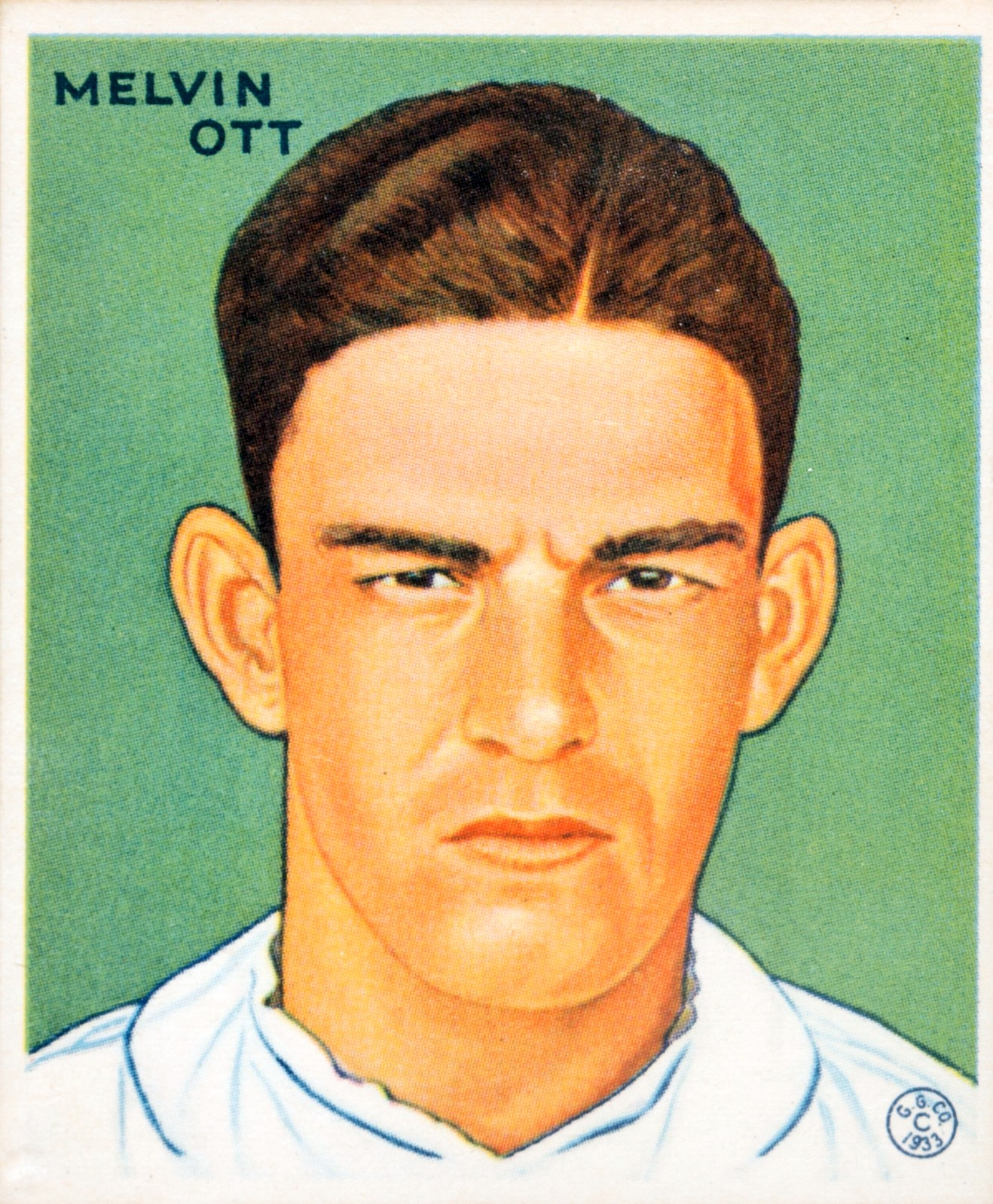
Mel Ott

New York Giants Hall of Famers
Affiliation according to the National Baseball Hall of Fame and Museum
New York Gothams/Giants

Dave Bancroft
Jake Beckley
Roger Bresnahan *
Dan Brouthers
Jesse Burkett
**Roger Connor** *
**George Davis** *
Leo Durocher

**Buck Ewing** *
Frankie Frisch
Burleigh Grimes
Gabby Hartnett
Rogers Hornsby
Waite Hoyt
**Carl Hubbell** *
**Monte Irvin**
**Travis Jackson** *

**Tim Keefe** *
Willie Keeler
**George Kelly** *
King Kelly
Tony Lazzeri
**Freddie Lindstrom** *
Ernie Lombardi
**Rube Marquard** *
**Christy Mathewson** *

**Joe McGinnity** *
**John McGraw** *
Joe Medwick
Johnny Mize
Hank O'Day
**Jim O'Rourke** *
**Mel Ott** *
Edd Roush
Amos Rusie *

Ray Schalk
Red Schoendienst
**Bill Terry** *
John Montgomery Ward *
**Mickey Welch** *
**Hoyt Wilhelm**
Hack Wilson
**Ross Youngs** *

- Players and managers listed in **bold** are depicted on their Hall of Fame plaques wearing a Giants or Gothams cap insignia.
- * New York Giants listed as primary team according to the Hall of Fame

=== Other ===
The following inducted members of the Hall of Fame played or managed for the Giants, but either played for the Giants and were inducted as a manager having never managed the Giants, or managed the Giants and were inducted as a player having never played for the Giants:

- Cap Anson – inducted as player, managed Giants in 1898.
- Hughie Jennings – inducted as player, managed Giants from 1924 to 1925.
- Bill McKechnie – inducted as manager, played for Giants in 1916.
- Frank Robinson – inducted as player, managed Giants from 1981 to 1984.
- Casey Stengel – inducted as manager, played for Giants from 1921 to 1923.

=== Retired numbers ===
The New York/San Francisco Giants have retired 11 numbers. Two were retired while the team was in New York. After the team moved west, they retired three more numbers used by New York players and honored two New York players who played before numbers were commonly worn.

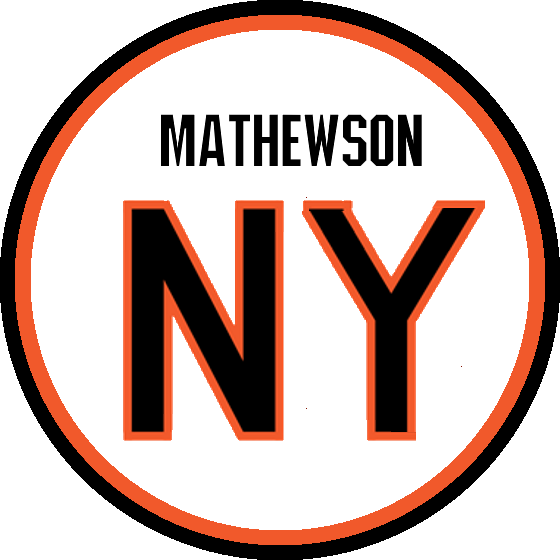
Christy
Mathewson
P

Honored
1988
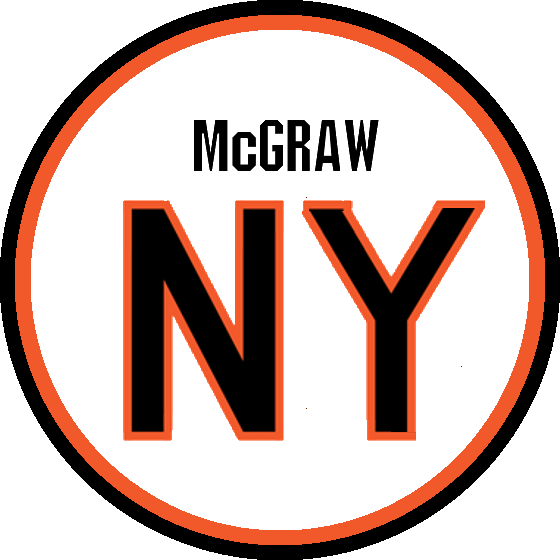
John
McGraw
3B
Mgr
Honored
1988
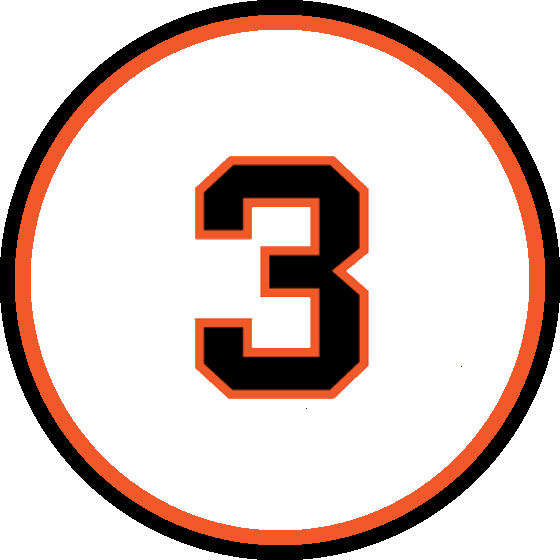
Bill
Terry
1B
Mgr, GM
Retired
1984
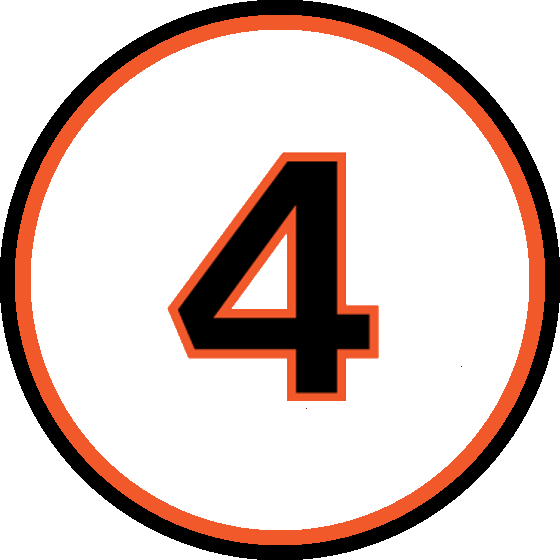
Mel
Ott
RF
Mgr
Retired
1949
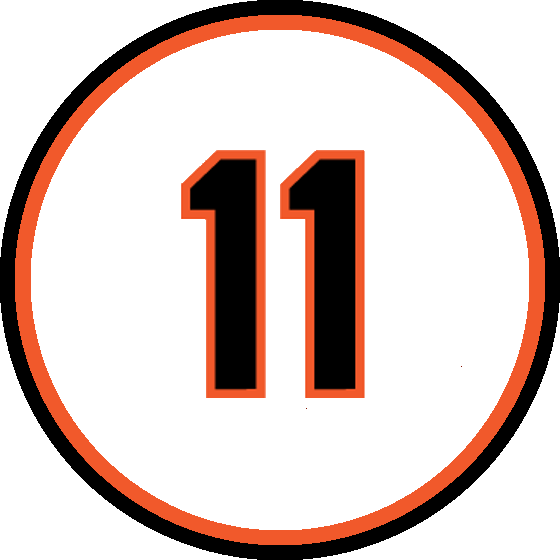
Carl
Hubbell
P

Retired
1944
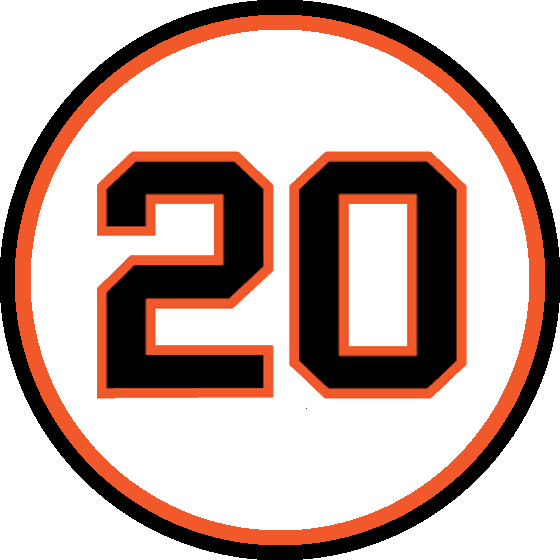
Monte
Irvin
LF

Retired June 26, 2010
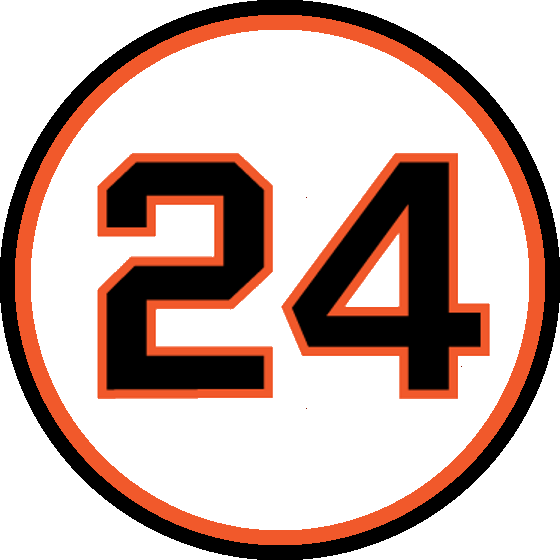
Willie
Mays
CF

Retired May 12, 1972

Every New York Giant whose number has been retired has been elected to the National Baseball Hall of Fame.

In 1944, Carl Hubbell (#11) became the first National Leaguer to have his number retired by his team. Bill Terry (#3), Mel Ott (#4), and Hubbell played or managed their entire careers for the New York Giants. Willie Mays (#24) began his career in New York and moved with the Giants to San Francisco in 1958.

Similarly honored are John McGraw (3B, 1902–1906; manager, 1902–1932) and Christy Mathewson (P, 1900–1916), members of the New York team before the introduction of uniform numbers; they have the letters "NY" displayed in place of a number.

Broadcaster Russ Hodges (1949–1957) is represented by an old-style radio microphone displayed in place of a number.

== Team captains ==
The Giants have had ten official recorded captains over the years:

- Jack Doyle, 1902
- Dan McGann, 1903–1907
- Larry Doyle, 1908–1916
- Gus Mancuso, 1937–1938
- Mel Ott, 1939–1947
- Alvin Dark, 1950–1956

== Season records ==
	Total games	Wins	Losses	Win %
New York Gothams/Giants regular season record	10,965	6,067	4,898	.553
New York Giants postseason record^{[b]}	82	39	41	.488
All-time regular and postseason record	11,047	6,106	4,939	.552
Pre-World Series postseason record	23	16	7	.696
Overall record	11,070	6,122	4,946	.552

== Home stadiums ==
- Polo Grounds I (1883–1888)
- Oakland Park (1889)
- St. George Cricket Grounds (1889)
- Polo Grounds II (1889–1890)
- Polo Grounds III (1891–1957)
  - Hilltop Park (1911 due to 1911 fire)

== Notes ==
Awards and achievements
Preceded by Pittsburgh Pirates; 1901–1903	National League champions New York Giants; 1905	Succeeded by Chicago Cubs; 1906–1908
Preceded by Boston Americans; 1903	World Series champions New York Giants; 1905	Succeeded by Chicago White Sox; 1906
Preceded by Chicago Cubs; 1910	National League champions New York Giants; 1911–1913	Succeeded by Boston Braves; 1914
Preceded by Brooklyn Robins; 1916	National League champions New York Giants; 1917	Succeeded by Chicago Cubs; 1918
Preceded by Brooklyn Robins; 1916	National League champions New York Giants; 1917	Succeeded by Chicago Cubs; 1918
Preceded by Brooklyn Robins; 1920	National League champions New York Giants; 1921–1924	Succeeded by Pittsburgh Pirates; 1925
Preceded by Cleveland Indians; 1920	World Series champions New York Giants; 1921–1922	Succeeded by New York Yankees; 1923
Preceded by Chicago Cubs; 1932	National League champions New York Giants; 1933	Succeeded by St. Louis Cardinals; 1934
Preceded by New York Yankees; 1932	World Series champions New York Giants; 1933	Succeeded by St. Louis Cardinals; 1934
Preceded by Chicago Cubs; 1935	National League champions New York Giants; 1936–1937	Succeeded by Chicago Cubs; 1938
Preceded by Philadelphia Phillies; 1950	National League champions New York Giants; 1951	Succeeded by Brooklyn Dodgers; 1952–1953
Preceded by Brooklyn Dodgers; 1952–1953	National League champions New York Giants; 1954	Succeeded by Brooklyn Dodgers; 1955–1956
Preceded by New York Yankees; 1949–1953	World Series champions New York Giants; 1954	Succeeded by Brooklyn Dodgers; 1955
