= List of Major League Baseball career shutout leaders =

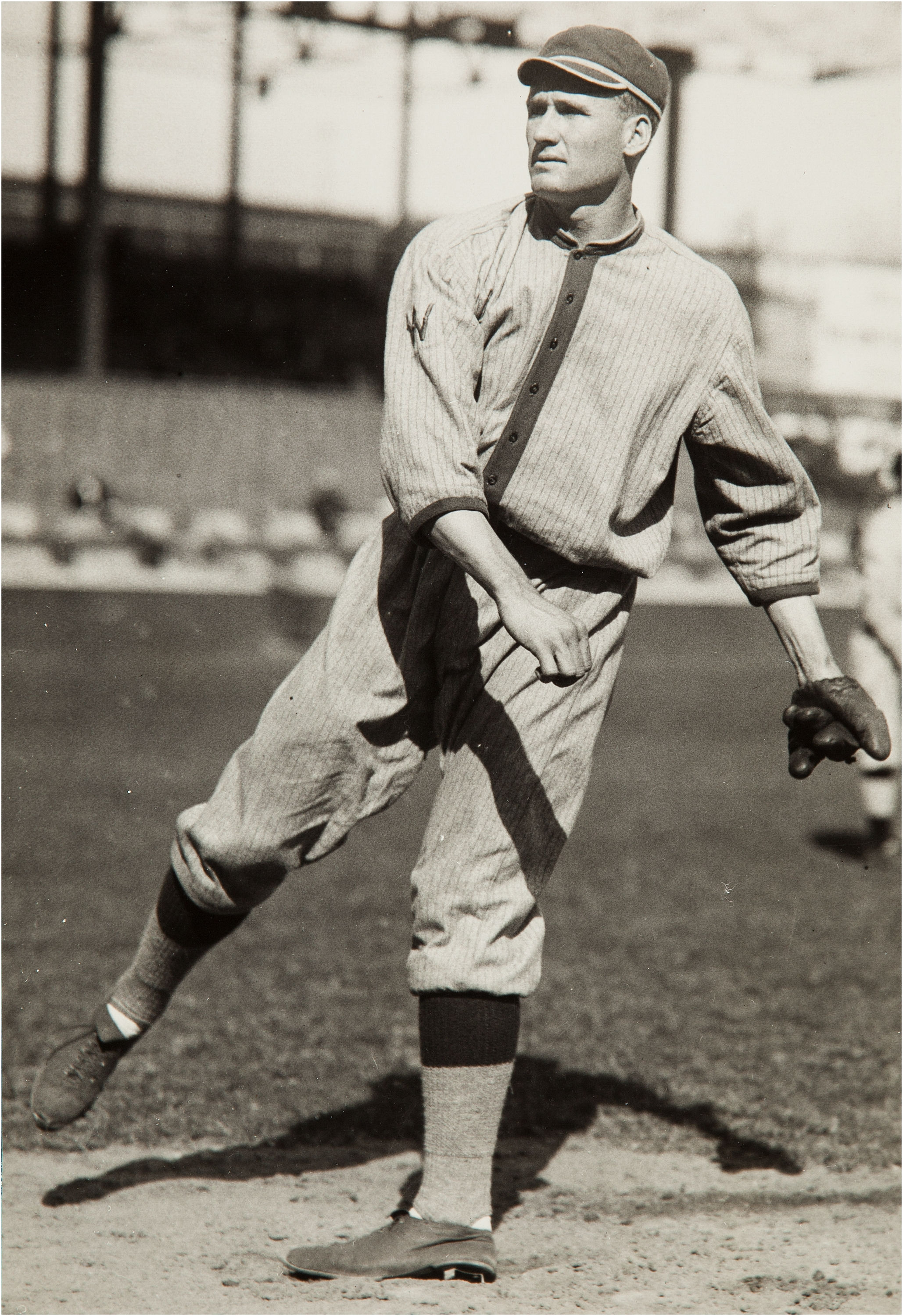
Walter Johnson, the all-time leader in shutouts

In Major League Baseball, a shutout (denoted statistically as ShO or SHO) refers to the act by which a single pitcher pitches a complete game and does not allow the opposing team to score a run. If two or more pitchers combine to complete this act, no pitcher is awarded a shutout, although the team itself can be said to have "shutout" the opposing team.

Walter Johnson is the all-time leader in shutouts with 110. Johnson also is the only pitcher to throw more than 100 shutouts.

== Key ==
Rank	Rank amongst leaders in career shutouts. A blank field indicates a tie.
Player	Name of the player
SHO	Total career shutouts thrown
*	Denotes elected to National Baseball Hall of Fame.

== List ==
- Stats updated through the end of the 2025 season.

Rank	Player	SHO
1	Walter Johnson*	110
2	Grover Cleveland Alexander*	90
3	Christy Mathewson*	79
4	Cy Young*	76
5	Eddie Plank*	69
6	Warren Spahn*	63
7	Nolan Ryan*	61
	Tom Seaver*	61
9	Bert Blyleven*	60
10	Don Sutton*	58
11	Pud Galvin*	57
	Ed Walsh*	57
13	Bob Gibson*	56
14	Mordecai Brown*	55
	Steve Carlton*	55
16	Jim Palmer*	53
	Gaylord Perry*	53
18	Juan Marichal*	52
19	Rube Waddell*	50
	Vic Willis*	50
21	Don Drysdale*	49
	Ferguson Jenkins*	49
	Luis Tiant	49
	Early Wynn*	49
25	Kid Nichols*	48
26	Roger Clemens	46
	Tommy John	46
	Jack Powell	46
29	Whitey Ford*	45
	Addie Joss*	45
	Phil Niekro*	45
	Robin Roberts*	45
	Red Ruffing*	45
	Doc White	45
35	Babe Adams	44
	Bob Feller*	44
37	Milt Pappas	43
38	Tommy Bond	42
	Catfish Hunter*	42
	Bucky Walters	42
41	Mickey Lolich	41
	Hippo Vaughn	41
	Mickey Welch*	41
44	Chief Bender*	40
	Jim Bunning*	40
	Larry French	40
	Sandy Koufax*	40
	Claude Osteen	40
	Ed Reulbach	40
	Mel Stottlemyre	40

Rank	Player	SHO
51	Tim Keefe*	39
	Sam Leever	39
	Jerry Reuss	39
54	Stan Coveleski*	38
	Billy Pierce	38
	Nap Rucker	38
57	Vida Blue	37
	John Clarkson*	37
	Larry Jackson	37
	Randy Johnson*	37
	Eppa Rixey*	37
	Steve Rogers	37
63	Mike Cuellar	36
	Bob Friend	36
	Carl Hubbell*	36
	Sad Sam Jones	36
	Camilo Pascual	36
	Allie Reynolds	36
	Curt Simmons	36
	Will White	36
71	Bullet Joe Bush	35
	Jack Chesbro*	35
	Eddie Cicotte	35
	Jack Coombs	35
	Wilbur Cooper	35
	Bill Donovan	35
	Burleigh Grimes*	35
	Lefty Grove*	35
	Greg Maddux*	35
	George Mullin	35
	Herb Pennock*	35
	Charles Radbourne*	35
83	Bill Doak	34
	Earl Moore	34
	Frank Tanana	34
	Jesse Tannehill	34
87	George Bradley	33
	Tommy Bridges	33
	Lew Burdette	33
	Dean Chance	33
	Mort Cooper	33
	Jerry Koosman	33
	Dutch Leonard	33
	Jim McCormick	33
	Dave McNally	33
	Hal Newhouser*	33
	Bob Shawkey	33
	Virgil Trucks	33
99	Paul Derringer	32
	Lefty Leifield	32

== See also ==
- Baseball statistics
- List of Major League Baseball career wins leaders
- List of Major League Baseball career games started leaders
- List of Major League Baseball career games finished leaders
- List of Major League Baseball career innings pitched leaders

== Sources ==
- "Career Leaders & Records for Shutouts". Baseball-Reference.com.
