= Games started =

Number of games that a baseball pitcher has started for his team

In baseball statistics, games started (denoted by GS) indicates the number of games that a pitcher has started for his team. A pitcher is credited with starting the game if he throws the first pitch to the first opposing batter. If a player is listed in the starting lineup as the team's pitcher, but is replaced before facing an opposing batter, the player is credited with a game pitched but not a game started; there have been instances in major league history in which a starting pitcher was removed before his first pitch due to an injury, perhaps suffered while batting or running the bases during the top half of the first inning.

Since 2018, teams have often used an "opener," typically a relief pitcher, to pitch the first inning or two, as a tactical decision, either to gain a platoon advantage against the first few batters or to allow the "starting pitcher" to pitch into the later innings without facing the batting lineup several times. In this case, the opener is the one credited with a game started because he threw the first pitch to the first opposing batter, even though the bulk of the innings are, or are intended to be, pitched by the so-called "starting pitcher."

The all-time leader for games started is Cy Young with 815 over a 22-year career. In the modern era, Nolan Ryan has the most games started in a career with 773. The players with the most starts in a single season are Pud Galvin and Will White, with 75 games started each. In the modern era, that record is held by Jack Chesbro, who had 51 starts in 1904.

For position players, games started is also used to denote the number of times their names appear in a team's starting lineup during the season.

The statistic is also used in other sports including football and basketball.

== See also ==
- List of Major League Baseball career games started leaders
- List of Major League Baseball career games finished leaders
- Complete game
- Shutouts in baseball
