= Shutout (baseball) =

Baseball achievement

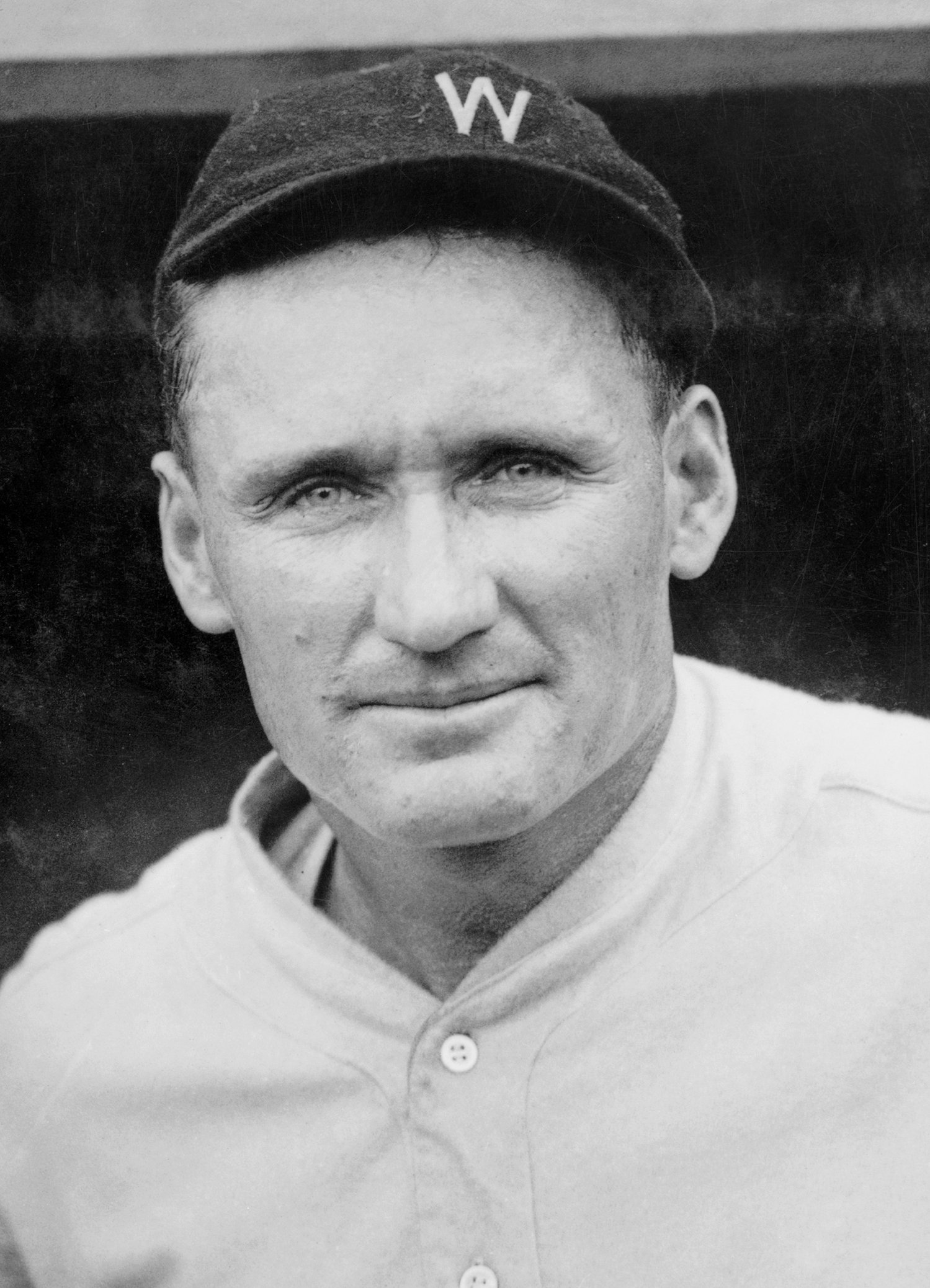
Walter Johnson of the Washington Senators holds the career record with 110 shutouts.

In Major League Baseball, a shutout (denoted statistically as ShO or SHO) refers to the act by which a single pitcher pitches a complete game and does not allow the opposing team to score a run. If two or more pitchers combine to complete this act, no pitcher is awarded a shutout, although the team itself can be said to have "shut out" the opposing team.

The ultimate single achievement among pitchers is a perfect game, which has been accomplished 24 times, most recently by Domingo Germán of the New York Yankees on June 28, 2023. Until a rule change implemented by MLB in 2020, a perfect game was previously also, by definition, counted as a shutout. A no-hitter completed by one pitcher is also a shutout unless the opposing team manages to score through errors, base on balls, catcher's interference, dropped third strikes, or hit batsmen. The all-time career leader in shutouts is Walter Johnson, who pitched for the Washington Senators from 1907 to 1927. He accumulated 110 shutouts, which is 20 more than the second place leader, Pete Alexander. The record for shutouts in a single season is 16, a mark which was achieved by George Bradley in 1876 and Alexander in 1916. These records are considered among the most secure records in baseball, because pitchers rarely earn more than one or two shutouts per season anymore due to a heavy emphasis on pitch count and relief pitching. Complete games themselves have also become rare among starting pitchers.

== Overview ==
A shutout is defined by Major League Baseball rule 10.18:

A shutout is a statistic credited to a pitcher who allows no runs in a game. No pitcher shall be credited with pitching a shutout unless he pitches the complete game, or unless he enters the game with none out before the opposing team has scored in the first inning, puts out the side without a run scoring and pitches the rest of the game without allowing a run. When two or more pitchers combine to pitch a shutout, the league statistician shall make a notation to that effect in the league's official pitching records.

A shutout in baseball statistics is abbreviated as ShO or SHO, not to be confused with strikeout (SO). To achieve a shutout, a pitcher must pitch a complete game without allowing the other team to score a run. However, there are exceptions and other stipulations to this rule.

Jim Creighton of the Excelsior of Brooklyn club is widely regarded to have thrown the first official shutout in history on November 8, 1860. In the National League's inaugural season of 1876, the eight teams played between 59 and 70 games, but it was common for each team to only have one pitcher on the team who pitched every inning of every game. For that reason, George Bradley pitched 16 shutouts in 1876, which still stands as the Major League record (tied with Pete Alexander who pitched the same number in 1916). Bradley's 16 shutouts in one year were almost half the total number he pitched in his nine-year career as a pitcher. From 1876 to 1916, 10 shutouts or more a season was recorded 19 times. With the increase in power hitting in the live-ball era, as well as the increased utilization of relief pitchers, shutouts and complete games dramatically declined. Since 1917, 10 or more shutouts a season has only been achieved 10 times by pitchers with very exceptional seasons. Jim Palmer was the last American League pitcher to achieve this mark with 10 in 1975, and John Tudor was the last National League pitcher with 10 in 1985, not including the 11th shutout that Tudor threw in the World Series that year.

In 1968 for the Los Angeles Dodgers, Don Drysdale pitched a Major League record six consecutive shutouts on his way to a total of eight. While his statistics that year are often overlooked when compared to fellow National League pitcher Bob Gibson, Drysdale did pitch a then-record 58 2/3 consecutive scoreless innings pitched over the course of a month, whereby he did not allow an opposing run. He can be said to have "shut out" the opposition for 58 2/3 consecutive innings pitched. That scoreless streak would later be broken by Dodgers pitcher Orel Hershiser in 1988, who pitched one more out than Drysdale to record 59 consecutive shutout innings. Ed Reulbach of the Chicago Cubs is the only pitcher in Major League Baseball history to have pitched two shutouts on the same day. On September 26, 1908, the Cubs played a doubleheader against the Brooklyn Dodgers. Reulbach pitched both games to completion, in which the Dodgers failed to score in both games.

Red Barrett (1944) holds the record for the fewest pitches needed to complete a nine-inning shutout with only 58 pitches—the fewest ever pitched in any nine-inning game in Major League history, as well as the quickest night game ever at one hour and 15 minutes. Among other records, Walter Johnson has the most Opening Day shutouts with seven, and Jamie Moyer (2010) is the oldest player to ever pitch a Major League shutout at 47 years 170 days old. Christy Mathewson holds the postseason record with four shutouts, including an unprecedented three (also a record) during the 1905 World Series.

=== Recording a shutout without starting or pitching a complete game ===
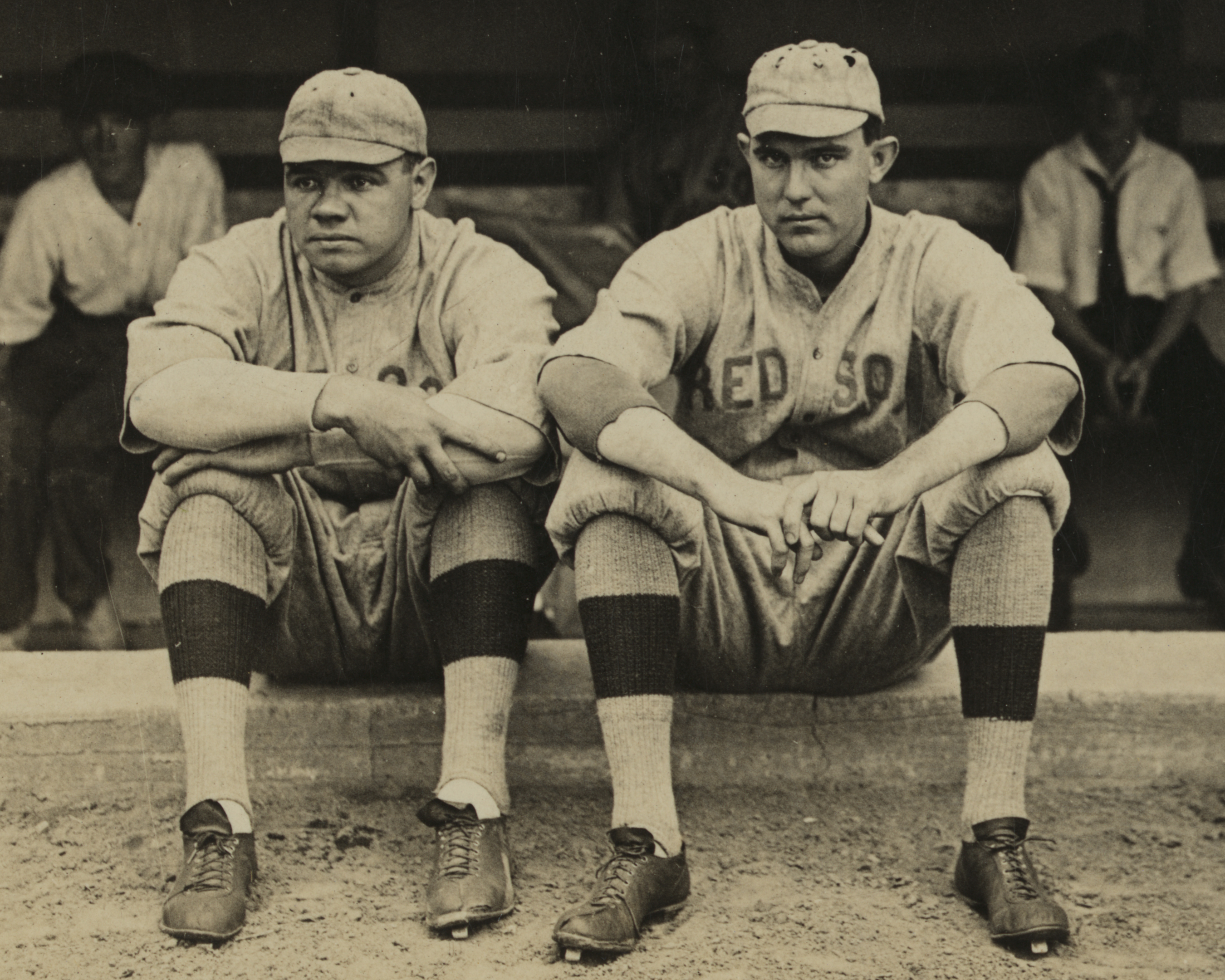
Ernie Shore (on the right next to Babe Ruth) earned a shutout without starting the game or pitching a complete game.

It is possible for a pitcher to record a shutout without starting the game or pitching a complete game, so long as all the outs in the game are recorded under the same pitcher with no opposing runs scored by the other team. A pitcher who begins the game is recorded as the starting pitcher, regardless of how long that pitcher pitches in the game. A pitcher must face at least one batter before being removed to be considered the starting pitcher and get recorded with the game started, whether the batter faced reached base or was put out in any way.

If the starting pitcher is removed from the game before the first recorded out by the opposing team, the pitcher that replaces him can still be eligible for a shutout if the game ends with the opposing team failing to score a run. However, the replacement pitcher cannot be credited with a game started or complete game. In addition to that, the replacement pitcher must complete the rest of the game without being taken out himself for another pitcher at any time during the game. An instance of this occurred on June 23, 1917, when Babe Ruth of the Boston Red Sox walked the first batter of the Washington Senators, Ray Morgan, in the bottom of the first inning. Ruth engaged in an argument with home plate umpire Brick Owens, whereby Ruth was ejected and escorted off the field. Ruth's replacement, Ernie Shore, proceeded to finish the game without allowing the Senators to score. In fact, Morgan was caught stealing, and Shore retired the next 26 batters in a row. The game was regarded as a perfect game for many years until it was officially downgraded to a combined no-hitter due to Ruth giving up the walk. Shore and Ruth were credited with a combined no-hitter, even though Ruth pitched unsuccessfully to only one batter in the game. Shore was credited with a shutout for his effort, despite not starting the game or pitching a complete game. However, if Ruth had conceded a run in the first inning without recording an out, such as allowing consecutive walks or hits, Shore would not be able to record a shutout since the other team had scored a run.

=== Games lasting shorter or longer than nine innings ===
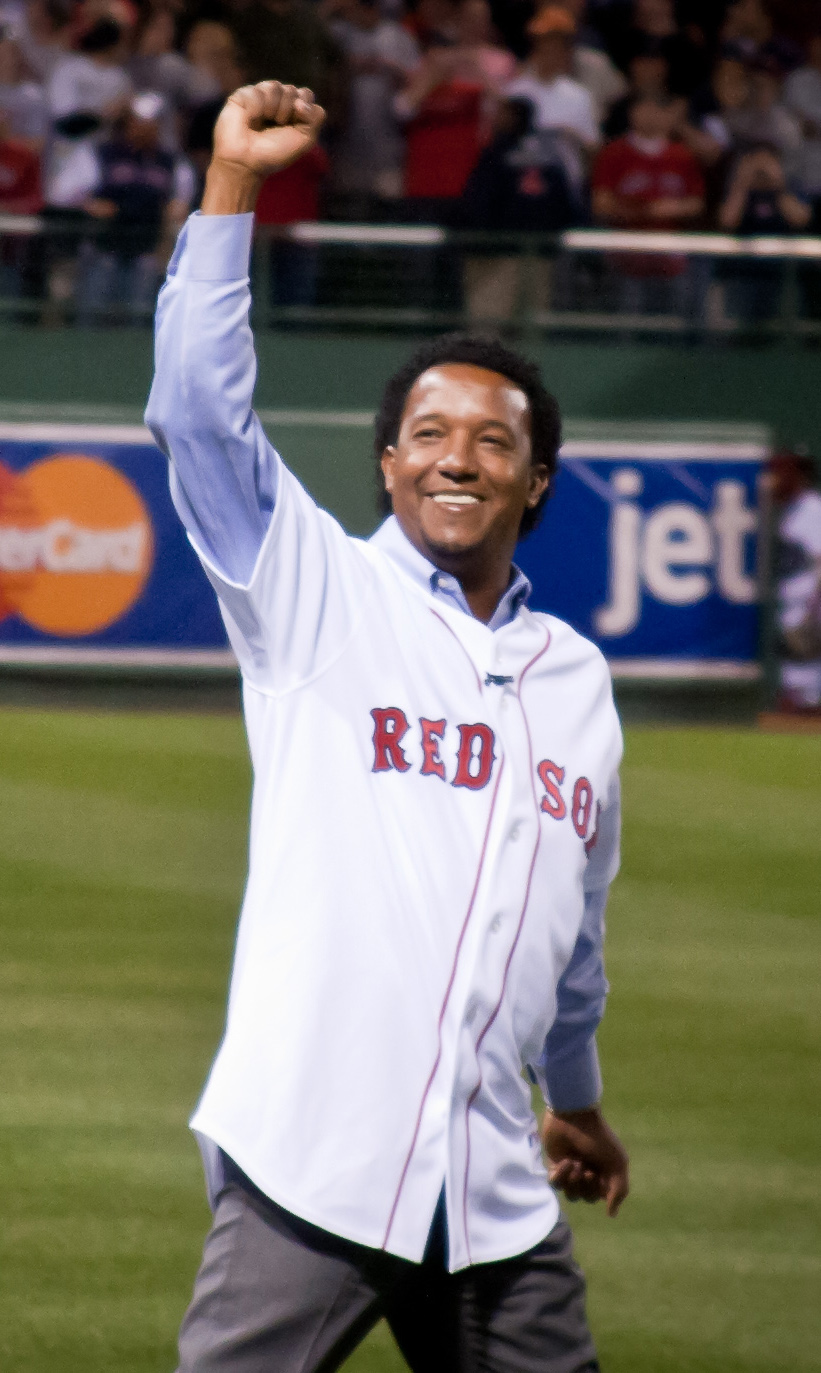
On June 3, 1995, Pedro Martínez pitched nine scoreless innings but did not record a shutout. The game went to extra innings, and Martínez lost his shutout opportunity when he was replaced in the 10th inning.

A shutout must fall under the technical definitions of a complete game, which consists of only one pitcher pitching an entire game, regardless of how long the game lasts. However, the complete game stipulation is waived if the same pitcher records every out in the game without having technically started the game, as in the game pitched by Ernie Shore. A standard Major League Baseball game consists of nine innings, unless weather or other uncontrollable elements prevent the game from being completed. If five or more innings have been played and the game cannot be resumed in a timely manner under normal conditions, it can be ruled as a "complete game" according to Major League Baseball rule 4.10. In this case, it is possible for a pitcher to complete only five innings pitched and still be credited with a complete-game shutout if the other team fails to score by the time the game is ended. However, no-hitter and perfect game bids are not official unless the game lasts at least nine innings. A shortened game cannot be considered a no-hitter or perfect game, but it can be counted as a shutout if applicable.

Conversely, if a game goes into scoreless extra innings, the same pitcher must pitch until the end of the game, despite having already pitched a full nine innings without allowing a run. If the pitcher is replaced or allows a run during an extra inning, he cannot receive a shutout. This situation is very rare, because starting pitchers will rarely pitch into extra innings. On June 3, 1995, Pedro Martínez of the Montreal Expos had a perfect game through nine innings against the San Diego Padres. The Expos failed to score as well, and the game was forced into extra innings. The Expos scored a run in the top of the 10th inning. In the bottom of the same inning, Martínez gave up a leadoff double to Bip Roberts to break up the perfect game and no-hitter. Martínez was immediately replaced by Mel Rojas, who retired the next three batters to end the game. Martínez was credited as the winning pitcher in a 1–0 Expos victory, but he did not record a complete game or a shutout for his efforts since another pitcher had taken part in the game. Arguably the most famous extra inning shutout was recorded by Jack Morris in Game 7 of the 1991 World Series. Morris was named the Series MVP for his 10-inning effort.

The longest complete-game shutout is 18 innings pitched by a single pitcher, which has occurred four times in Major League history: John Montgomery Ward (1882), Ed Summers (1909), Walter Johnson (1918), and Carl Hubbell (1933).

=== No-hitters that are not shutouts ===
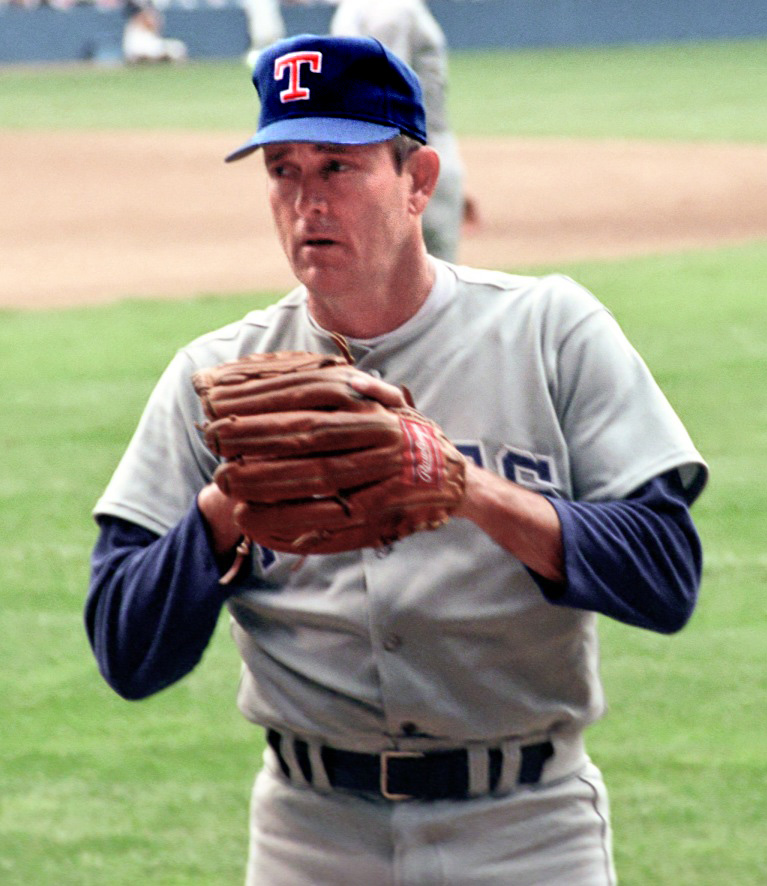
Nolan Ryan pitched a record seven no-hitters, all earning him a shutout as well since his opponents failed to score a run in any way. He led the league in shutouts three times and is ranked seventh all-time with 61.

In the majority of cases, a no-hitter is also recorded as a shutout if it is performed by a single pitcher pitching a complete game. If a no-hitter is achieved with more than one pitcher, no pitcher is awarded a shutout or a no-hitter, but a team shutout and no-hitter is still acknowledged. It is possible under rare circumstances for a no-hitter to not be a shutout (either individually or a combined effort). If the opposing team manages to score through a series of errors, sacrifice flies, hit batsman, or base on balls, the no-hitter remains intact while the shutout is lost. Since 1875, there have been 322 recorded no-hitters, and the vast majority of these have been completed by a single pitcher. Of that number, 25 instances resulted in a no-hitter that was not a shutout since the other team managed to score without actually getting a hit. Of these, there have only been two instances where the team that achieved no hits in the game actually won. One of these games was a combined no-hitter loss accomplished by more than one pitcher, and there has only been one recorded instance in history where a single pitcher lost a complete-game no-hitter.

On April 23, 1964, Ken Johnson of the Houston Colt .45s was beaten 1–0 by the Cincinnati Reds despite the Reds not getting a single hit. The only other instance of a lost no-hitter occurred when the Baltimore Orioles lost to the Detroit Tigers by a score of 2–1 on April 30, 1967. While the Tigers recorded no hits during this game and still won, the Orioles used more than one pitcher (Steve Barber and Stu Miller), therefore eliminating an individual shutout opportunity. Barber was replaced with two outs in the ninth inning and came one out away from joining Johnson as the only pitcher to single-handedly lose a no-hitter.

For games that were shortened due to weather, darkness, or other uncontrollable scenarios, a shutout can still be recorded by a single pitcher, but under Major League Baseball's official definition of a no-hitter, a no-hitter cannot be achieved unless the game lasts nine innings. Any game lasting shorter than a full nine innings cannot qualify, even if one team fails to achieve a hit before the game ends.

Conversely, if a starting pitcher on the visiting team is losing the game (despite giving up no hits) after his team bats in the top of the ninth inning, his team will not take the field again unless they tied or took the lead. By this unusual situation, the starting pitcher will only have pitched eight complete innings with no chance to pitch a ninth-inning to attempt a no-hitter. If the starting pitcher is on the home team, he will have a chance to pitch in the top of the ninth inning—a situation that occurred with Ken Johnson and later the combined efforts of Barber and Miller. However, a winning home team will not bat (and the visiting team will not field) in the bottom of the ninth if they are winning, and the game will end with only 8 1/2 innings played. In 1991, Major League Baseball changed the definition of a no-hitter to require that a pitcher throw at least nine full innings for the no-hitter to be official. With that change, there have been five no-hit performances ruled ineligible despite the pitcher pitching an eight-inning complete game in a losing effort: Silver King (June 21, 1890), Andy Hawkins (July 1, 1990), Matt Young (April 12, 1992), the combined pitching of Jered Weaver and José Arredondo (June 28, 2008), and the combined pitching of Hunter Greene and Art Warren (May 15, 2022).

=== Team shutouts ===
If two or more pitchers combine to throw a shutout, no pitcher is credited individually with a shutout, but the team as a whole can be said to have "shut out" the other team. The record for the most consecutive shutouts by a single team is held by the Pittsburgh Pirates, who recorded six consecutive shutouts in 1903. That team also holds the record for most consecutive scoreless innings pitched with 56. The Chicago White Sox and the Chicago Cubs hold the record for the most shutout victories achieved in a single season with 32; the White Sox did so in 1906, and the Cubs did so in 1907 and 1909. The 1908 St. Louis Cardinals hold the record of being shut out 33 times in one season. Only five teams in Major League Baseball history have gone an entire season without recording a single shutout victory. In 1898, three teams—the Brooklyn Bridegrooms, St. Louis Browns, and Washington Senators—failed to defeat a team all season without allowing a run. The 1899 Cleveland Spiders also achieved this record—winning 20 games to a record 134 losses. The only team since then to record no shutout victories was the expansion 1993 Colorado Rockies. That year, the Rockies had a record of 67–95, in which they never shut out their opponents in any of their 67 wins.

The largest margin of victory in a "shutout" game is held by the Providence Grays, who defeated the Philadelphia Quakers 28–0 on August 21, 1883. The largest shutout margin of victory in recent times was 22–0 when the Cleveland Indians defeated the New York Yankees on August 31, 2004.

== League leaders ==
Los Angeles Dodgers pitcher Sandy Koufax led the National League with 11 shutouts and also won the league's Most Valuable Player and Cy Young Award in 1963. His 11 shutouts are also the single-season record by a left-handed pitcher.

The pitcher who has the most shutouts at the end of the season is recognized as the league leader in that statistic. The National League and American League both have their own league leaders. A pitcher that leads the league in shutouts is often regarded as one of the best pitchers in the league. Such an accomplishment often makes that pitcher a contender for the Cy Young Award or even rarer as the league's Most Valuable Player, because a high number of shutouts may yield a high number of wins and a low earned run average.

Since the establishment of the MVP Award in 1933, each league elects their own MVP, in which 11 American League pitchers and nine National League pitchers have captured their respective league's highest individual award. The following American League pitchers have led the league in shutouts and captured the MVP Award: Lefty Grove (1931), Spud Chandler (1943), Hal Newhouser (1945), and Vida Blue (1971). The following National League pitchers have also led the league in shutouts and captured the MVP award: Dizzy Dean (1934), Mort Cooper (1942), Sandy Koufax (1963), Carl Hubbell (1933), and Bob Gibson (1968). Established in 1956, the Cy Young Award was only awarded to one pitcher in Major League Baseball; separate awards were given to the American and National League starting in 1967. Since the award was established, there have been 25 times (out of a total of 106 awards given since 1956) where the award was given to a pitcher who also led the league in shutouts. Since the establishment of the Rookie of the Year Award in 1947, three pitchers have led the league in shutouts in their rookie year and also captured the Rookie of the Year Award: Don Newcombe (1949), Fernando Valenzuela (1981), and Hideo Nomo (1995). Only 16 pitchers in the history of the American and National League have led the league in shutouts in their rookie season; only two of these came from the American League.

Walter Johnson, Pete Alexander, and Cy Young each hold the record for having led the league in shutouts on seven occasions. They are ranked first, second, and fourth respectively on the list of career shutouts. More recently, Roger Clemens led the league six times. Pete Alexander and George Bradley hold the single season shutout record with 16 — a record that is unlikely to ever be broken. 27 pitchers on 29 occasions have accumulated 10 or more shutouts in a single season, while Ed Walsh and Pete Alexander are the only pitchers to have achieved 10 or more on two separate occasions. Of those 29 occasions, only three of these occasions were not high enough to lead the league. In the National League in 1884, Jim McCormick and Charles Radbourn had 10 and 11 shutouts respectively, while Pud Galvin had 12. Also, in the American Association in 1886, Dave Foutz had 11 shutouts but came second to the 12 by Ed Morris.

With the decline in shutouts, since 1999, only six pitchers—A. J. Burnett, Dontrelle Willis, CC Sabathia, Roy Halladay, Cliff Lee and Félix Hernández—have achieved five or more shutouts in a single season, although Sabathia's five shutouts are a combined total from having played in both leagues in one season. CC Sabathia is the only player in history to have led both leagues in shutouts in the same year when he did so in 2008. He had two shutouts for the Cleveland Indians of the American League when he was traded in the middle of the season to the Milwaukee Brewers of the National League. He accumulated three shutouts with the Brewers to lead the league. His two shutouts in the American League would also lead the league at the end of the year, even though he was in a different league at the time. Recently, accumulating only 2–3 shutouts may qualify a pitcher to lead or tie the league lead in shutouts.

For career shutout leaders, see List of Major League Baseball career shutout leaders.

=== Top active career leaders ===
(as of the end of the 2023 season)

Rank	Player	Debut	Shutouts
1	Clayton Kershaw	2008	15
2	Justin Verlander	2005	9
3	Johnny Cueto	2008	8
4	Gerrit Cole	2013	5
4	Shelby Miller	2012	5
4	Max Scherzer	2008	5

== Pitchers with 10 or more shutouts in one season ==
Denotes a member of the Baseball Hall of Fame

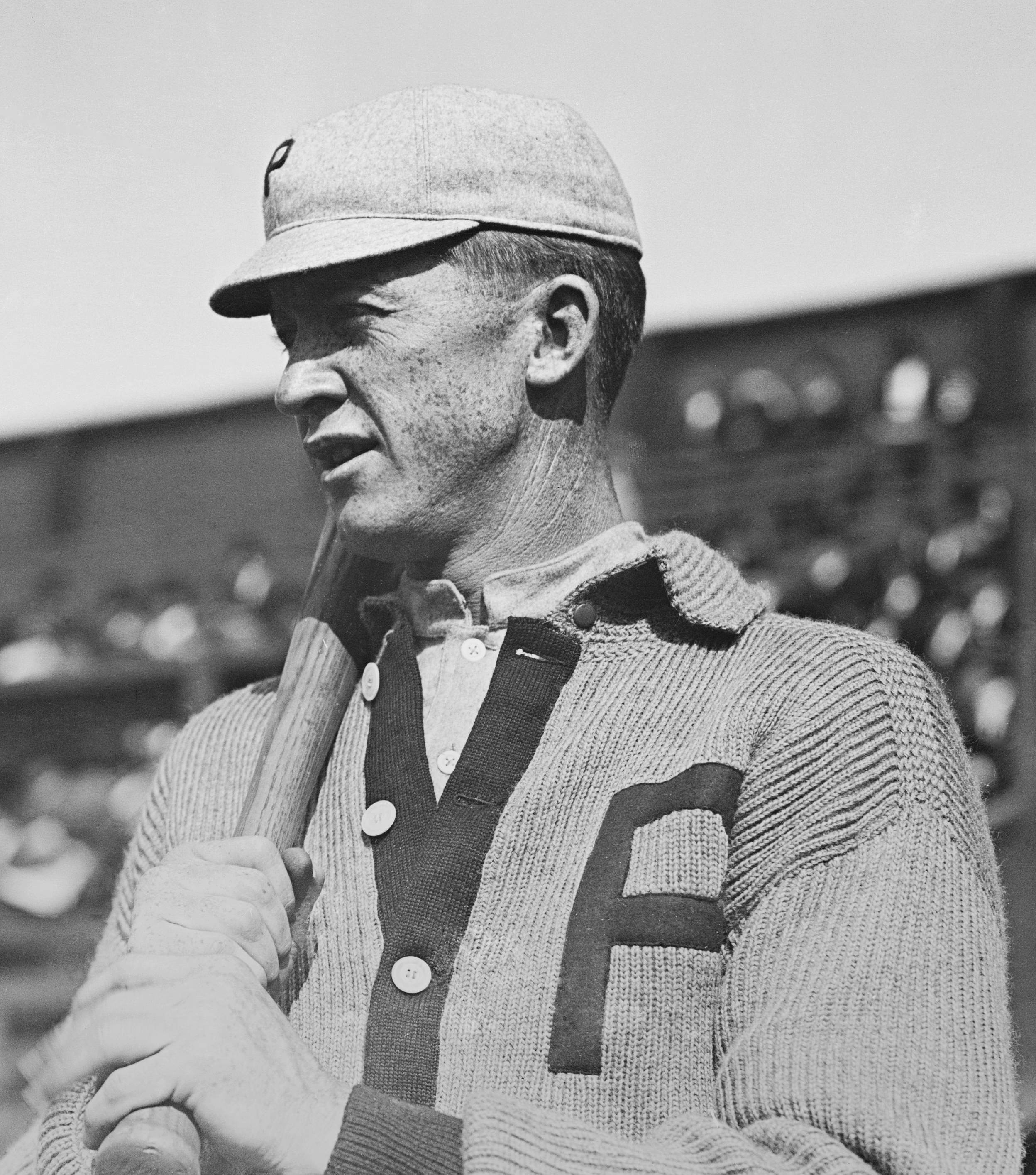
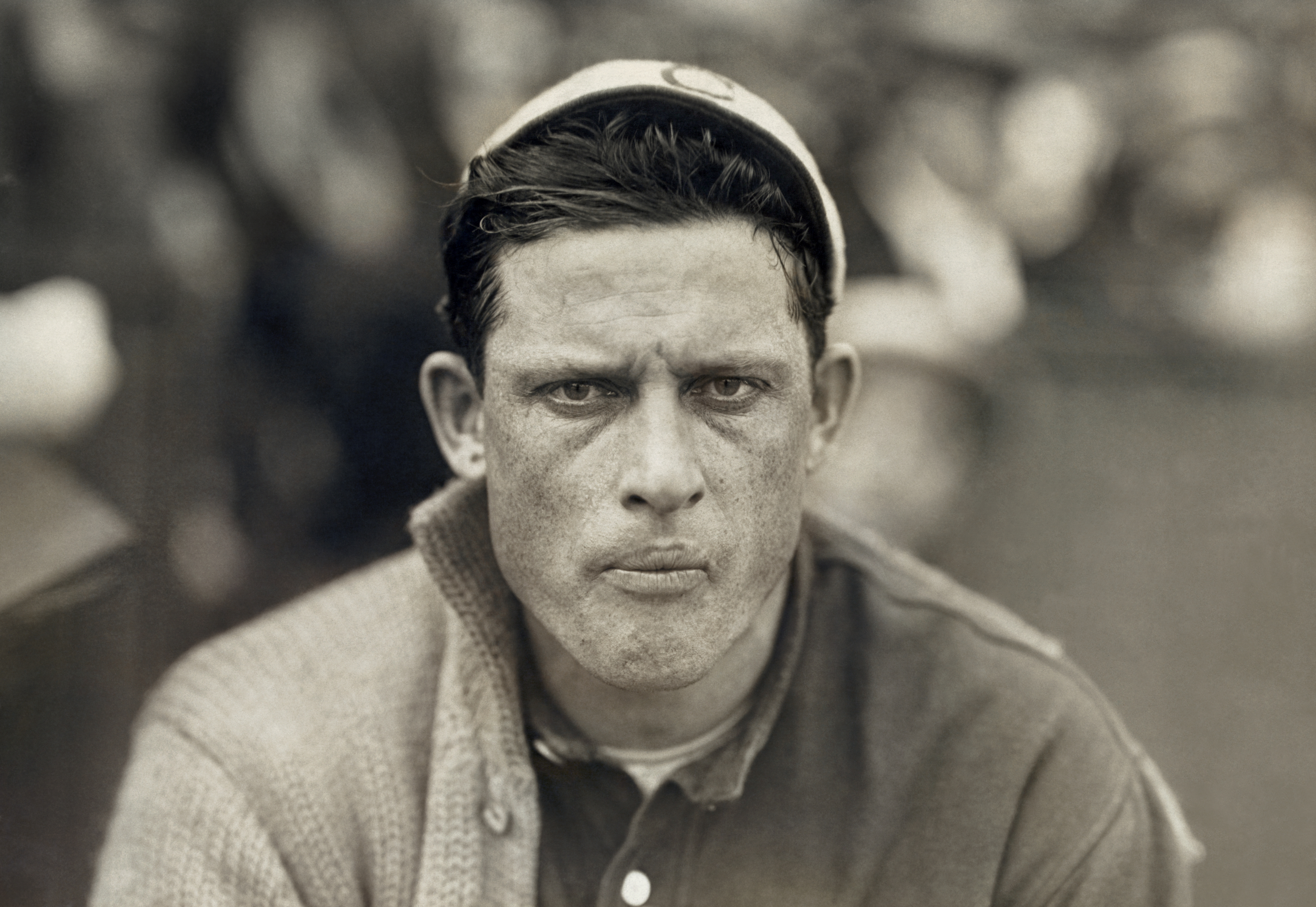
Pete Alexander (top) and Ed Walsh (bottom) are the only two pitchers in Major League Baseball history to have pitched 10 or more shutouts in two separate seasons.

Year	Player	Team	League	Shutouts
1876	George Bradley	St. Louis Brown Stockings	NL	16
1916	Pete Alexander (2)	Philadelphia Phillies	NL	16
1968	Bob Gibson	St. Louis Cardinals	NL	13
1910	Jack Coombs	Philadelphia Athletics	AL	13
1886	Ed Morris	Pittsburgh Alleghenys	AA	12
1915	Pete Alexander	Philadelphia Phillies	NL	12
1884	Pud Galvin	Buffalo Bisons	NL	12
1908	Christy Mathewson	New York Giants	NL	11
1886	Dave Foutz	Baltimore Orioles	AA	11
1964	Dean Chance	Los Angeles Angels	AL	11
1908	Ed Walsh (2)	Chicago White Sox	AL	11
1884	Charles Radbourn	Providence Grays	NL	11
1963	Sandy Koufax	Los Angeles Dodgers	NL	11
1879	Tommy Bond	Boston Red Caps	NL	11
1913	Walter Johnson	Washington Senators	AL	11
1946	Bob Feller	Cleveland Indians	AL	10
1948	Bob Lemon	Cleveland Indians	AL	10
1933	Carl Hubbell	New York Giants	NL	10
1904	Cy Young	Boston Americans	AL	10
1915	Dave Davenport	St. Louis Terriers	FL	10
1907	Eddie Plank	Philadelphia Athletics	AL	10
1906	Ed Walsh	Chicago White Sox	AL	10
1965	Juan Marichal	San Francisco Giants	NL	10
1884	Jim McCormick	Cleveland Blues	NL	10
1975	Jim Palmer	Baltimore Orioles	AL	10
1885	John Clarkson	Chicago White Stockings	NL	10
1985	John Tudor	St. Louis Cardinals	NL	10
1942	Mort Cooper	St. Louis Cardinals	NL	10
1912	Smoky Joe Wood	Boston Red Sox	AL	10

== See also ==
- Baseball statistics
- List of Major League Baseball annual shutout leaders
- List of Major League Baseball career shutout leaders
