= CC Sabathia =

American baseball player (born 1980)

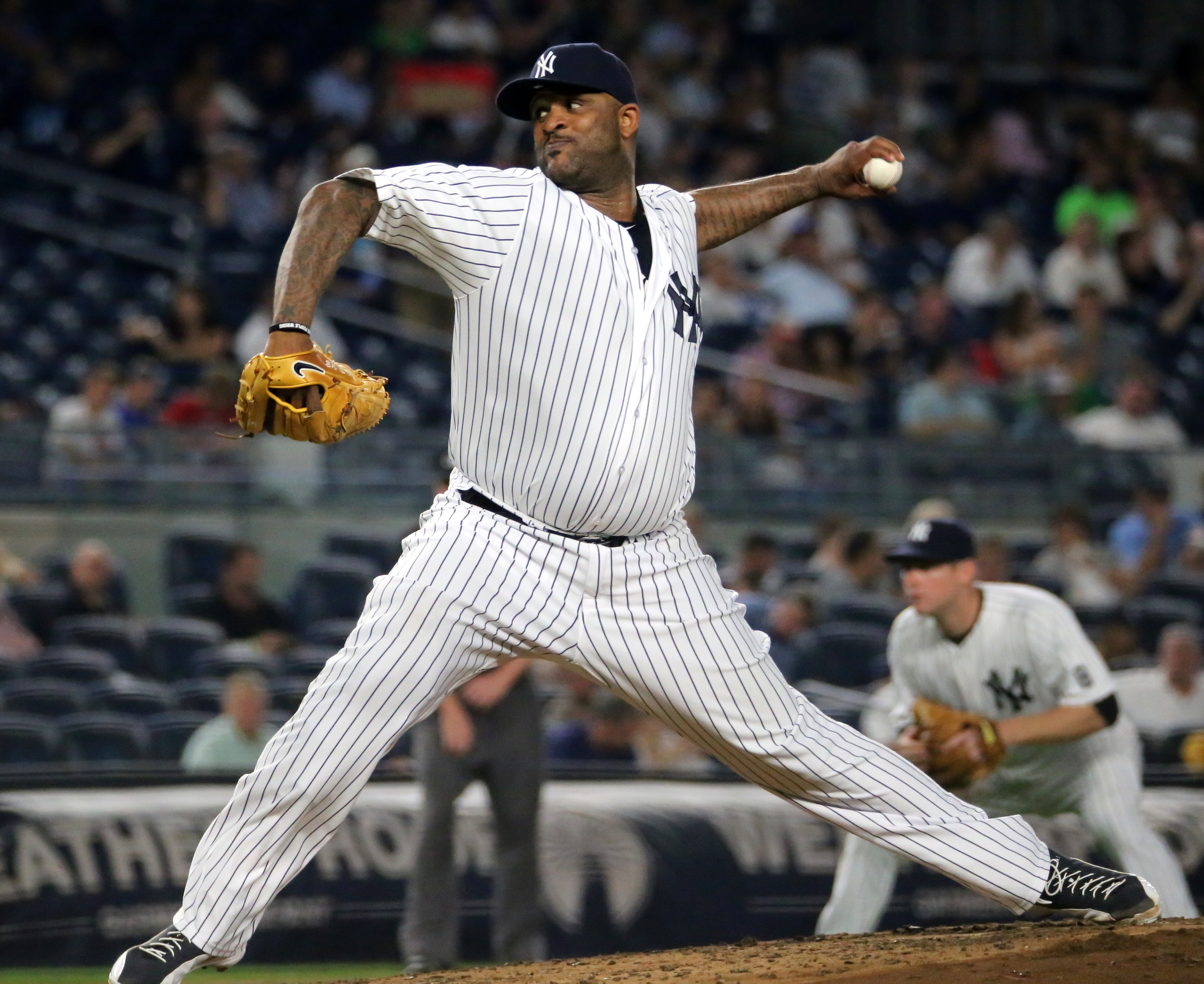
- Sabathia with the New York Yankees in 2016
- Pitcher
- Born: July 21, 1980 (age 46); Vallejo, California, U.S.
- Batted: Left Threw: Left

MLB debut
- April 8, 2001, for the Cleveland Indians

Last MLB appearance
- September 24, 2019, for the New York Yankees

MLB statistics
- Win–loss record: 251–161
- Earned run average: 3.74
- Strikeouts: 3,093
- Stats at Baseball Reference

Teams
- Cleveland Indians (2001–2008); Milwaukee Brewers (2008); New York Yankees (2009–2019)

Career highlights and awards
- 6× All-Star (2003, 2004, 2007, 2010–2012); World Series champion (2009); AL Cy Young Award (2007); ALCS MVP (2009); 2× MLB wins leader (2009, 2010); New York Yankees No. 52 retired; Cleveland Guardians Hall of Fame; Milwaukee Brewers Wall of Honor; Monument Park honoree

Member of the National

Baseball Hall of Fame
- Induction: 2025
- Vote: 86.8% (first ballot)

Carsten Charles Sabathia Jr. (/səˈbæθiə/ sə-BA-thee-uh; born July 21, 1980) is an American former professional baseball pitcher who played 19 seasons in Major League Baseball (MLB) for the Cleveland Indians, Milwaukee Brewers, and New York Yankees. Sabathia batted and threw left-handed.

Sabathia made his major league debut with the Cleveland Indians in 2001 and placed second in the American League (AL) Rookie of the Year Award voting, behind the year's AL Most Valuable Player, Ichiro Suzuki. Sabathia played the first seven and a half seasons of his career with the Indians, with whom he won the 2007 Cy Young Award. He led the Indians to the 2007 AL Central Division title and their first postseason berth since his rookie year. Following a trade, Sabathia played the second half of the 2008 season with the Milwaukee Brewers, helping them make the playoffs for the first time in 26 years.

In the 2008 offseason, Sabathia signed a seven-year, $161 million contract with the New York Yankees; at the time, it was the largest contract ever signed by a pitcher. With the Yankees, Sabathia led all of MLB in wins in both 2009 and 2010 and won a World Series championship in 2009. He was also voted the 2009 AL Championship Series Most Valuable Player. After mid-career struggles attributed to lost fastball velocity, chronic knee injuries, and alcoholism, Sabathia again found success in the late 2010s after reinventing himself as a control pitcher before retiring after the 2019 season.

During his career, Sabathia was named an All-Star six times and won the Warren Spahn Award three times in a row (2007–2009). In August 2017, Sabathia became the all-time AL leader in strikeouts by a left-handed pitcher. On April 30, 2019, he became the seventeenth pitcher in MLB history to reach 3,000 career strikeouts. When he retired following the end of the 2019 season, he led all active Major League players in career wins, career innings pitched, and career strikeouts. With 251 career victories, Sabathia is tied with Bob Gibson for the second-most wins by a Black pitcher in major league history (behind Ferguson Jenkins); he was the first pitcher to debut in the 21st century and post at least 250 career wins in regular-season play. In 2025, Sabathia was elected to the Baseball Hall of Fame in his first year of eligibility.

== Early life ==
Sabathia was born in Vallejo, California and attended Vallejo High School, where he excelled in baseball, basketball, and football. As a teenager, Sabathia played summer baseball in the Major League Baseball youth program, Reviving Baseball in Inner Cities (RBI). In baseball, he compiled a win–loss record of 6–0 with an 0.77 earned run average (ERA) and 82 strikeouts in 45 2/3 innings pitched during his senior season. He was the top high school prospect in Northern California according to Baseball America. In football, he was an all-conference tight end. He received scholarship offers to play college football, including one from the University of California, Los Angeles; he signed a letter of intent to attend the University of Hawaiʻi at Mānoa and to play baseball and football for the Hawaiʻi Rainbow Warriors. Sabathia graduated from Vallejo High School in 1998 and went directly from high school to minor league baseball.

== Professional career ==
=== Draft and minors ===
The Cleveland Indians selected Sabathia in the first round, with the 20th overall selection, of the 1998 MLB draft. He signed for a $1.3 million signing bonus and pitched in the Indians' minor league system for three seasons.

In 2000, Sabathia was selected for the 28-man United States Olympic Team roster. He appeared in one pre-Olympic tournament game in Sydney, Australia, but was not on the official 24-man, Gold Medal-winning roster because he was called up by the Cleveland Indians. He was named the Indians' 2000 Minor League Player of the Year (receiving the "Lou Boudreau Award").

=== Cleveland Indians (2001–2008) ===
In 2001, at age 20, Sabathia began his rookie season as the youngest player in the Major Leagues. He made his major league debut on April 8, 2001 against the Baltimore Orioles, allowing three earned runs on three hits while walking two and striking out three in 5 2/3 innings. Sabathia would take a no-decision in Cleveland's 4–3 win. He ended the season with a 17–5 record and a 4.39 ERA in 33 starts, finishing second in the AL voting for Rookie of the Year behind future Yankees teammate Ichiro Suzuki. Sabathia also made his first postseason appearance in 2001, pitching Game 3 of the 2001 American League Division Series against the Seattle Mariners. He earned the win, pitching six innings, allowing two earned runs and striking out five in a 17–2 rout. At 21 years, 85 days of age, Sabathia became the second-youngest pitcher to win a Division Series game, after Fernando Valenzuela in 1981. The Indians went on to lose the series to the Mariners in five games.

On February 23, 2002, Sabathia signed a four-year, $9.5 million contract with the Indians that contained a club option for 2006. For the 2002 season, he finished 13–11 with a 4.37 ERA in 33 starts. Sabathia ranked tenth in the AL in strikeouts, with 149 in 210 innings. In 2003, Sabathia was 13–9 in 30 starts, and had the tenth-best ERA in the AL (3.60). He was also named to the American League All-Star team for the first time. Sabathia made his second All-Star selection in a row as he finished the 2004 season by going 11–10 with a 4.12 ERA in 30 starts, striking out 139 batters in 188 innings.

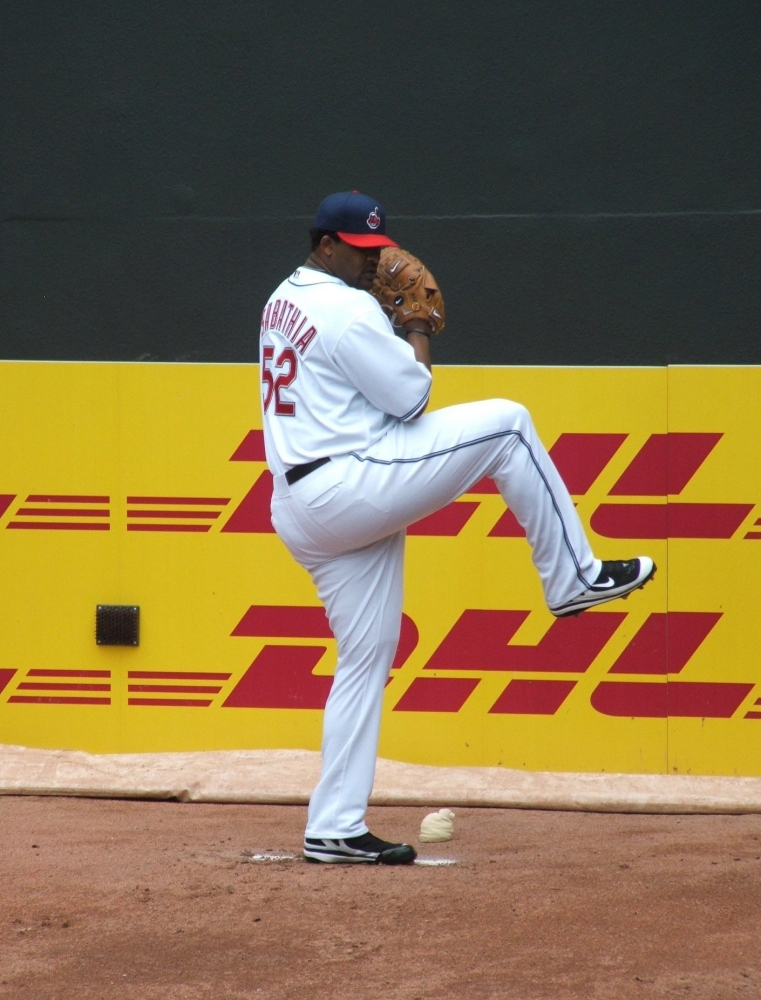
Sabathia with the Indians in 2006

The Indians picked up Sabathia's $7 million club option for 2006 on April 27, 2005, and he subsequently signed a two-year, $17.75 million deal. In 2005, Sabathia posted a 15–10 record with a 4.03 ERA in 31 starts. He was fourth in the AL in strikeouts/9 IP (7.37), seventh in strikeouts (161) and eighth in wins. He threw the fastest fastball in the AL in 2005, averaging 94.7 miles per hour.

In 2006, Sabathia made 28 starts, going 12–11 with a 3.22 ERA. led the major leagues with six complete games. He also led the AL in shutouts (2) and was third in ERA and eighth in strikeouts (172).

Sabathia "burst onto the national scene" in 2007, "when he won the AL Cy Young after recording a 19–7 record, a 3.21 ERA, a 1.14 WHIP, 209 strikeouts, and a major league-leading 241 innings pitched and 5.56 strikeout-to-walk ratio". He collected his 1,000th career strikeout on May 21, 2007, fanning the player who beat him out for Rookie of the Year honors: Ichiro Suzuki of the Seattle Mariners. He was also named to the American League All-Star team for the third time. On September 28, he became the youngest pitcher to record 100 career wins since Greg Maddux in 1993. On October 23, Sabathia won the Players Choice Award for Outstanding AL Pitcher. His pitching performance led Cleveland to its first American League Central Division Championship since 2001, his rookie season. For his performance, he won the 2007 American League Cy Young Award, joining Gaylord Perry as one of only two Cleveland Indians pitchers to ever win it. (Cliff Lee, Corey Kluber, and Shane Bieber have since also won, with Kluber winning twice.) Sabathia also won the Warren Spahn Award given to the best left-handed pitcher in the Majors. Despite his strong regular season, Sabathia did not perform well against the Boston Red Sox in the American League Championship Series. In two starts, he went 0–2 with a 10.45 ERA.

Sabathia began the 2008 season 6–8 with a 3.83 ERA in 18 starts. With the Indians out of playoff contention, and with Sabathia an impending free agent, the Indians traded him.

On July 30, 2008, Sabathia took out a large $12,870 ad in the sports section of Cleveland's daily newspaper, The Plain Dealer. The ad, signed by Sabathia, his wife Amber, and his family read:

Thank you for 10 great years ... You've touched our lives with your kindness, love and generosity. We are forever grateful! It's been a privilege and an honor!

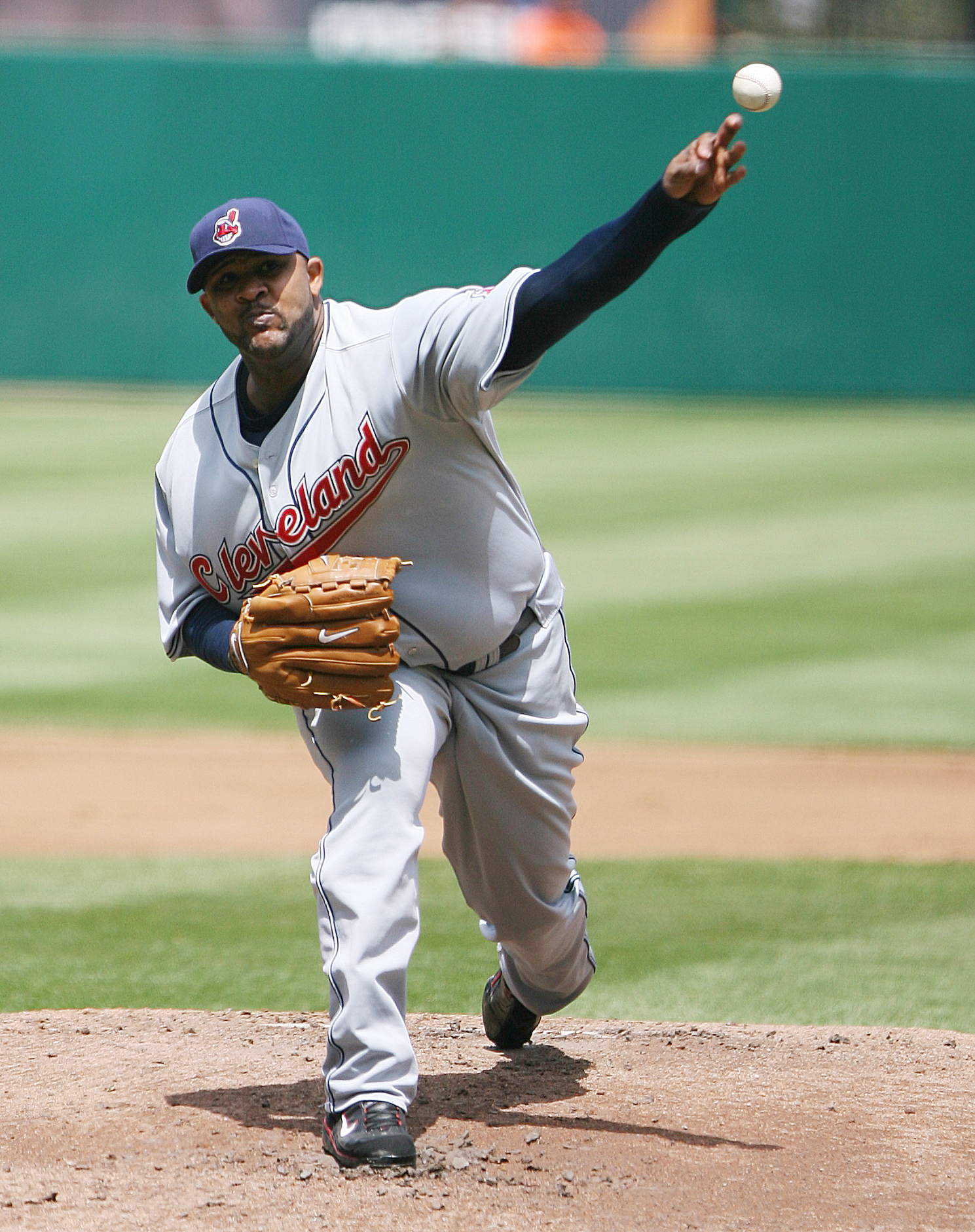
Sabathia with the Indians in 2007, his Cy Young year

Sabathia finished his tenure with the Indians with 106 wins against 71 losses in 237 starts, a 3.83 ERA and 1.265 WHIP, and 1,265 strikeouts in 1,528 2/3 innings.

=== Milwaukee Brewers (2008) ===
On July 7, 2008, Cleveland traded Sabathia to the Milwaukee Brewers for Matt LaPorta, Zach Jackson, Rob Bryson, and a player to be named later. In October, future All-Star Michael Brantley was added as the final piece of the trade; unusually, under the trade provisions the Indians were able to select the player themselves because the Brewers went on to make the playoffs. Sabathia recalled in Till The End, his 2021 memoir, that an unexpected positive of the trade was being put on a roster with multiple other Black athletes. "To be Black in America is to constantly be on guard ... With the Brewers, for the first time in my baseball life, I could be more at ease." During his first Brewers press conference, Sabathia told the assembled members of the media that he would prefer his name to be spelled "CC" rather than "C. C."

On September 28, 2008, Sabathia pitched a complete-game four-hitter against the Cubs in the final game of the regular season; the Brewers won, 3–1, and clinching the wild card when the New York Mets lost later that evening. The team's 2008 postseason appearance was its first since 1982. Sabathia started Game 2 of the 2008 NLDS against the Philadelphia Phillies; it was his fourth consecutive start in which he pitched on three days' rest. Sabathia surrendered five runs in 3 2/3 innings, walking pitcher Brett Myers and giving up a grand slam to Shane Victorino. The Phillies would go on to win the World Series. Teammate Mike Cameron later opined that Sabathia had taken on so much work that season that he "had nothing left" for the playoff game.

For the season, Sabathia was 17–10 overall with a 2.70 ERA in 35 starts and struck out 251 batters in a major-league leading 253 innings, posting 10 complete games (five shutouts). Sabathia was sixth in the voting for the 2008 NL MVP award. Sabathia was particularly dominant during his tenure with Milwaukee, going 11–2 across 17 starts with a 1.65 ERA and a 1.003 WHIP, striking out 128 batters against just 25 walks in 130 2/3 innings, and throwing seven complete games (three shutouts). Despite only spending half the season in the National League, he finished fifth in the NL Cy Young Award voting and sixth in the NL MVP vote (finishing as the highest-ranking pitcher). He was also awarded the Warren Spahn Award for the second year in a row. A 2025 ESPN retrospective cited Sabathia's performance and its impact on the Brewers' franchise in ranking him the best trade deadline acquisition of all time.

=== New York Yankees (2009–2019) ===
==== 2009: Major league wins leader, ALCS MVP, World Series champion ====
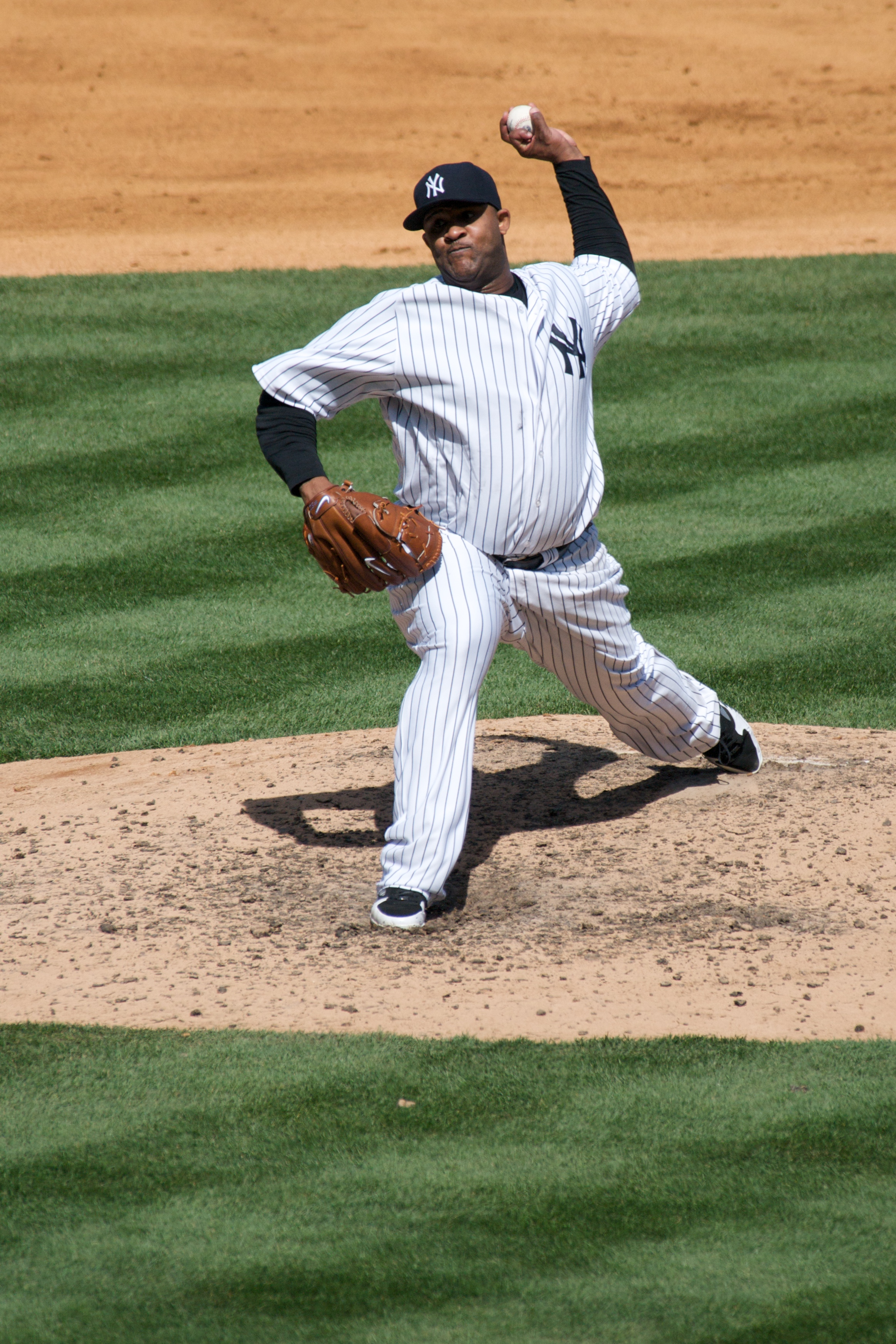
Sabathia in April 2009, making his first home start for the Yankees in the first regular season game at the new Yankee Stadium

On December 18, 2008, Sabathia signed a seven-year, $161 million contract with the New York Yankees. It was the largest contract for a pitcher in MLB history at the time. On March 26, 2009, manager Joe Girardi announced that Sabathia would be the Opening Day starter and the starter for the home opener at the new Yankee Stadium. Sabathia finished the season 19–8 with a 3.37 ERA (the fourth-best in the American League) and 1.15 WHIP across 34 starts. He struck out 197 batters in 230 innings against 67 walks, gave up 197 hits and just 18 home runs, held opponents to a .232 batting average, and threw two complete games (one shutout). His 19 wins were tied for the most in the major leagues that year alongside Félix Hernández, Justin Verlander, and Adam Wainwright. He was also awarded the August 2009 AL Pitcher of the Month Award, posting a 5–0 record in six starts with a 2.64 ERA and 49 strikeouts in 44 1/3 innings. Sabathia was particularly dominant after the All-Star break, going 11–2 in 15 starts, striking out 102 batters in 101 2/3 innings and posting a 2.74 ERA. The Yankees finished the regular season with a 103–59 record, the best in the Major Leagues.

Sabathia earned his first career postseason victory with the Yankees in the first game of the 2009 ALDS against the Minnesota Twins. He gave up two runs (one earned) in 6 2/3 innings with eight strikeouts as the Yankees swept the series in three games, their first postseason series win since 2004. Sabathia also won the American League Championship Series (ALCS) Most Valuable Player Award; in two starts against the Los Angeles Angels of Anaheim, he went 2–0 with a 1.13 ERA in 16 innings, throwing eight innings of one-run ball in both of his starts. The Yankees beat the Angels in six games to advance to their first World Series since 2003.

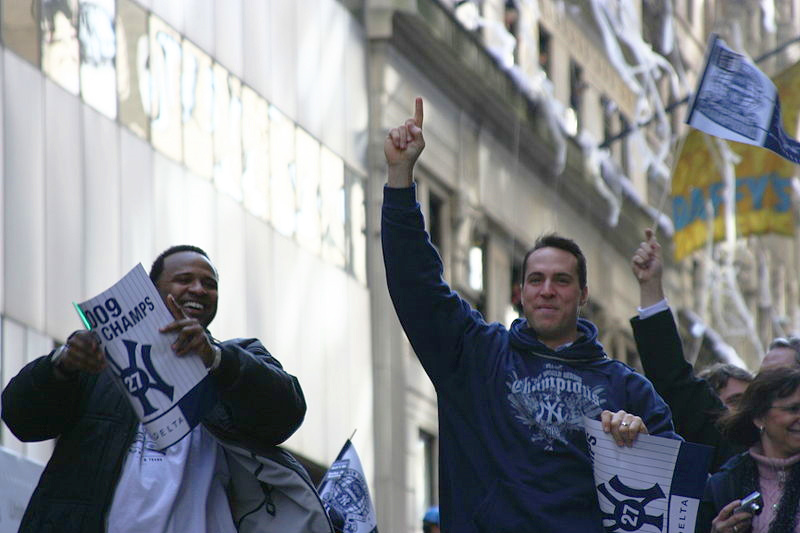
CC Sabathia (left) and Mark Teixeira during the 2009 World Series victory parade

Despite failing to pick up a win in either of his World Series starts, Sabathia was effective, posting a 3.29 ERA in 13 2/3 innings to help lead the Yankees to a series win over the defending champion Philadelphia Phillies in six games. The World Series championship was the Yankees' 27th, their first in the new Yankee Stadium, their first since 2000, and the first of Sabathia's career. In five postseason starts, Sabathia went 3–1 with a 1.98 ERA in 36 1/3 innings. Sabathia finished fourth in the AL Cy Young Award voting behind Zack Greinke, Hernández, and Justin Verlander and 21st in the MVP voting (being one of six Yankees players to receive MVP votes). He also received the Warren Spahn Award for the third year in a row, becoming the first Yankees pitcher to win it since Andy Pettitte in 2003.

==== 2010–2012: Continued dominance ====
On July 4, 2010, Sabathia earned his fourth All-Star selection, and his first as a Yankee. At the time of the All-Star break, Sabathia was 12–3 with a 3.09 ERA in 131 innings (19 starts). On August 22, Sabathia recorded his 16th consecutive start of at least six innings allowing three earned runs or less, breaking a tie with Ron Guidry (from his Cy Young Award-winning 1978 season) for the longest streak in franchise history. His streak was snapped in his next start on August 28, where he allowed five earned runs in seven innings to the Chicago White Sox. The 2010 season was the first in Sabathia's career in which he won 20 games. He ended the season with 21 wins, the most in the major leagues, against just 7 losses. In 237 2/3 innings pitched, Sabathia posted a 3.18 ERA and 1.19 WHIP, gave up 209 hits, struck out 197 batters against 74 walks, threw two complete games, and held opponents to a .239 batting average. 26 of his 34 starts were quality starts, a career-high. The Yankees won the AL Wild Card after finishing second in the AL East to the Tampa Bay Rays with a 95–67 record. Despite posting a 2–0 record in three playoff starts that year, Sabathia posted a 5.63 ERA across 16 innings as the Yankees were defeated in the ALCS by the Texas Rangers in six games. He finished third in the AL Cy Young Award voting behind Félix Hernández and David Price, as well as 13th in the MVP voting.

During the offseason, Sabathia was diagnosed with a torn meniscus in his right knee, requiring arthroscopic surgery performed by Dr. Christopher Ahmad to repair. Sabathia began therapy immediately after the surgery and began his regular routine in preparation for spring training after three to six weeks. He lost weight in an effort to prevent future problems with his knee.

In 2011, Sabathia was the Opening Day starter for the Yankees for the third year in a row. Sabathia was named to his fifth career All-Star Game, replacing James Shields on the roster; however, he elected to pitch the Sunday before the All-Star Game and his spot on the active roster was given to Alexi Ogando. In his final start before the All-Star break, Sabathia threw a complete game, four-hit shutout against the Rays at Yankees Stadium, his first at home since he joined the Yankees. He struck out nine and walked one, outdueling Shields as the Yankees beat the Rays 1–0. He became the first Yankee pitcher to have 13 wins by the All-Star break since Andy Pettitte in 1996, and his 2.72 ERA was the lowest ERA by a Yankee starter in the first half of the season since David Cone in 1999. On July 26, 2011, Sabathia took a perfect game through 6 1/3 innings against the Seattle Mariners, retiring the first 19 batters he faced in a game interrupted twice due to rain. He ended up striking out 14 batters through seven innings (setting a career high), and pitching a combined one-hitter. For his performance in July 2011 (a 4–1 record in five starts with a 0.92 ERA, just one home run allowed, 50 strikeouts in 39 innings pitched, and a .140 batting average against), Sabathia was named the AL Pitcher of the Month, his fifth career Pitcher of the Month award and second with the Yankees. Sabathia recorded his 2,000th career strikeout on September 10, 2011, against Torii Hunter of the Los Angeles Angels of Anaheim in a 6–0 Yankees loss.

Across 33 starts in 2011, Sabathia had a 19–8 record, a 3.00 ERA, and a 1.23 WHIP. Across 237 1/3 innings, he struck out 230 batters against 61 walks (good for 8.72 K/9 and 3.72 K/BB ratios), held batters to a .255 batting average, threw three complete games (one shutout), posted 22 quality starts, and gave up just 17 home runs for a career-low rate of 0.64 home runs per nine innings. His 230 strikeouts marked the third-highest number of strikeouts in a single season in franchise history, the most since Ron Guidry's franchise record 248 strikeouts in 1978, and the second-most in the American League behind Justin Verlander's 250 strikeouts. Sabathia also became the first Yankee pitcher to strike out more than 200 batters in a single season since Randy Johnson in 2005, as well as the first Yankee pitcher to finish in the top two in the American League in strikeouts since Johnson did so that same year. The Yankees won the AL East once again with a 97–65 record, however, Sabathia struggled in the ALDS, posting a 6.23 ERA in 8 2/3 innings in three appearances (two starts) as the Yankees were defeated by the Detroit Tigers in five games. Sabathia once again finished fourth in the AL Cy Young voting, placing behind Verlander (who won the Cy Young, Triple Crown, and MVP awards), Jered Weaver, and Shields, as well as 14th in the MVP ballot.

Though his contract with the Yankees allowed him to opt out and become a free agent after the 2011 season, Sabathia said he had no intention of opting out of his contract. On October 31, 2011, Sabathia announced that he had signed a contract extension with the Yankees. The contract extension added one season (2016) to Sabathia's contract and called for him to be paid $25 million that season. In addition, the extension provided for a vesting option in which Sabathia would be paid $25 million for the 2017 season unless the Yankees exercised a $5 million buyout due to issues with Sabathia's left shoulder.

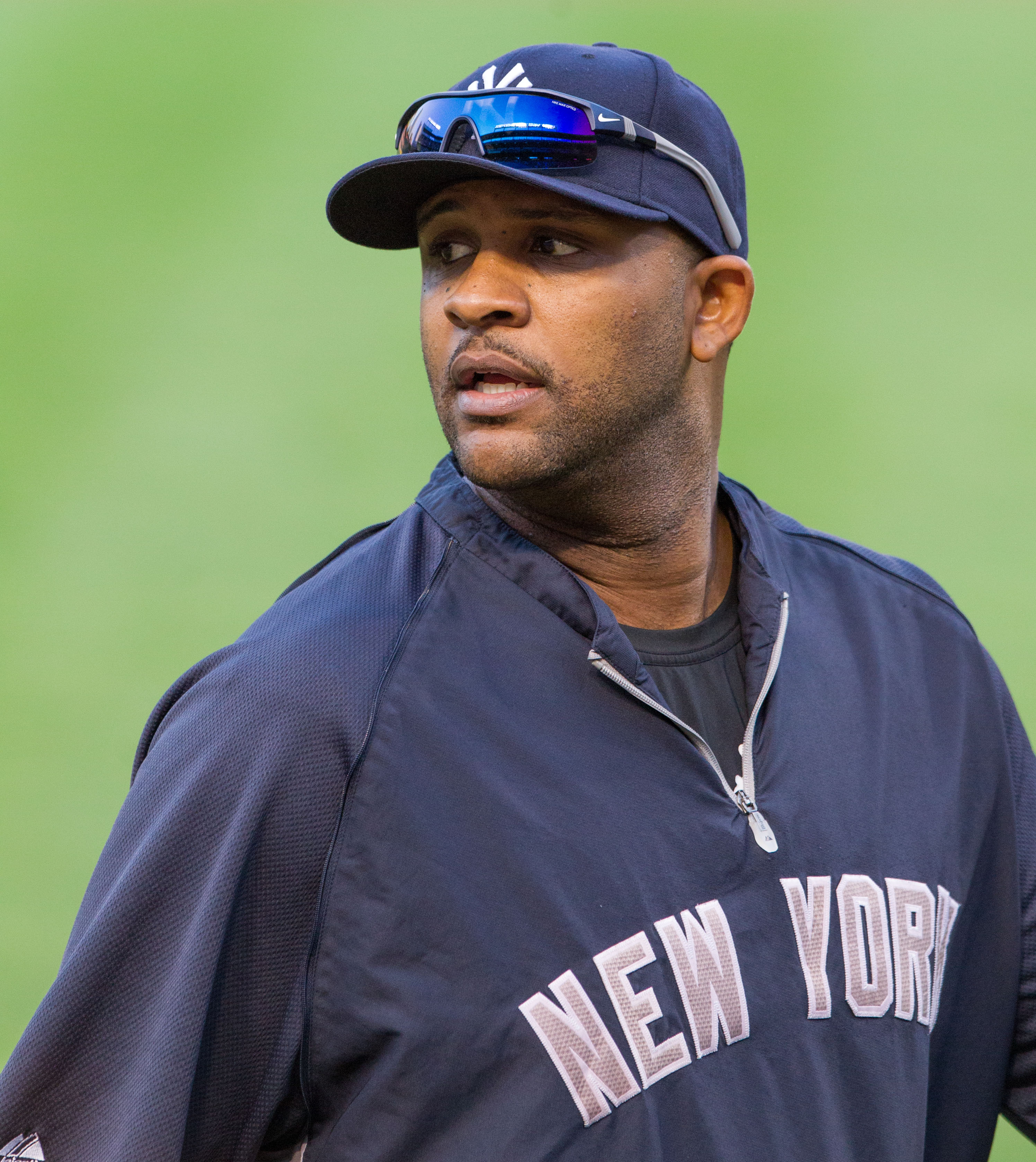
Sabathia during pregame warmups in September 2012

Sabathia began the 2012 season poorly, allowing a grand slam by Carlos Peña in his first inning of work on Opening Day against the Tampa Bay Rays. He recovered, however, going 9–3 with a 3.45 ERA in his first 15 starts before the All-Star break. He threw a complete game against the Atlanta Braves on June 18, allowing two runs and one walk while striking out ten. It was Sabathia's 34th career complete game and eighth as a Yankee. Sabathia was named an All-Star for the third season in a row and sixth time in his career; however, he was unable to participate as he was placed on the disabled list on June 27 with a strained adductor muscle. Sabathia was placed on the disabled list again on August 11 with soreness in his left elbow, but returned on August 24 against the Cleveland Indians, tossing 7 1/3 strong innings in a 3–1 win. He finished the year strongly after returning from injury, post a 2.93 ERA across his final eight starts (despite an average record of 3–3), striking out 57 in 58 1/3 innings against nine walks and limiting opponents to a batting average of .215. Despite only making 28 starts in the 2012 season, Sabathia reached the 200+ innings pitched tier for the sixth consecutive year (and seventh overall). Alongside a 15–6 record with a 3.38 ERA and a 1.14 WHIP, Sabathia gave up 184 hits in exactly 200 innings, struck out 197 batters against just 44 walks (his 4.48 strikeout-to-walk ratio was the best among all American League starters and his 1.98 BB/9 rate was his lowest since his Cy Young-winning season in 2007), threw two complete games, and held batters to a .238 average. Of his 28 starts, 19 were quality starts. The Yankees won the AL East for the third time in four years with a 95–67 record, the best in the American League.

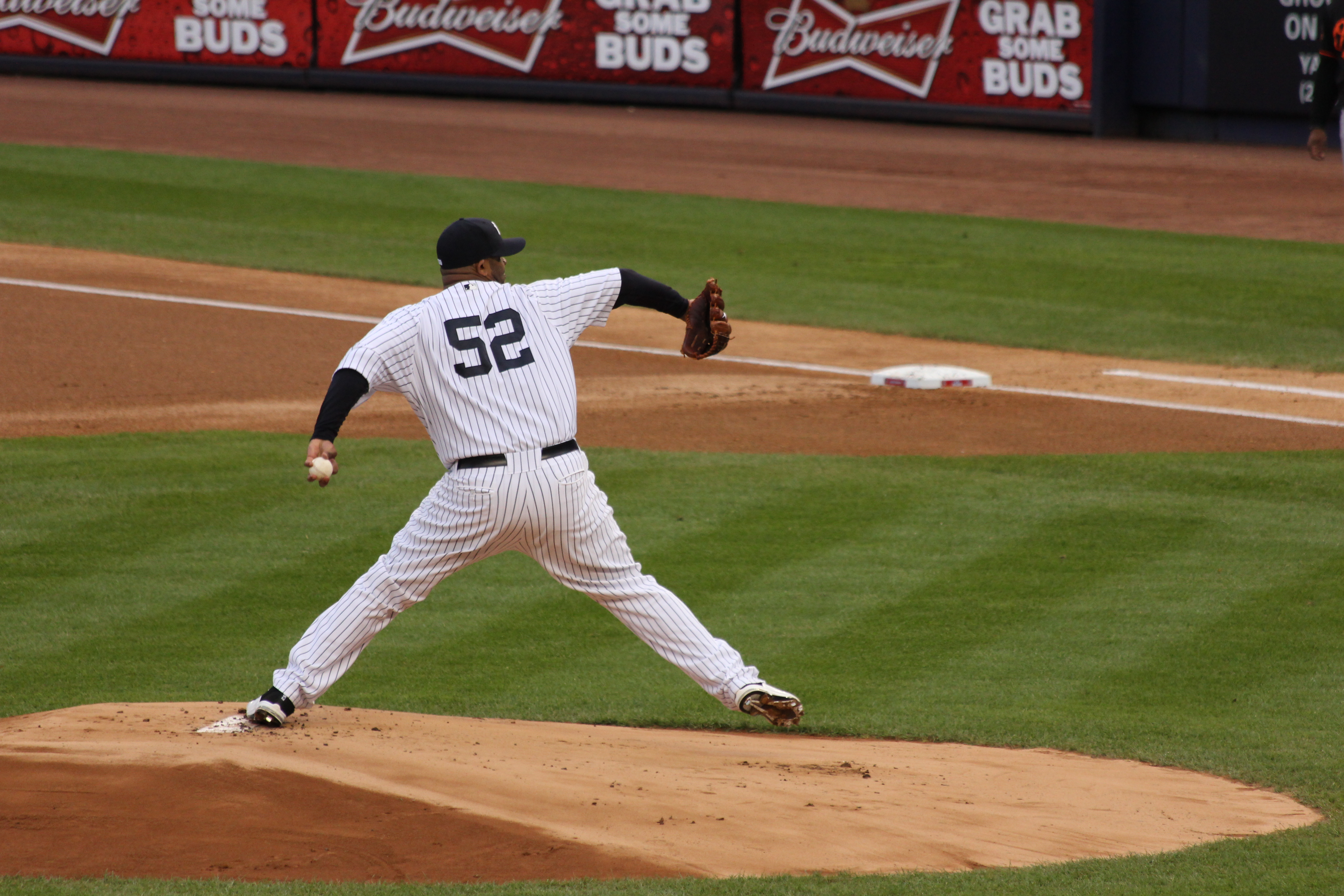
Sabathia pitching in Game 5 of the 2012 AL Division Series

In the 2012 American League Division Series, Sabathia dominated, winning both the first and fifth (deciding) games against the Baltimore Orioles. After throwing 8 2/3 innings and giving up just two earned runs in a win at Camden Yards in Game 1, Sabathia threw his first career postseason complete game in Game 5, allowing one run, four hits, two walks and striking out nine as the Yankees defeated the Orioles in five games. However, Sabathia lost Game 4 of the 2012 ALCS (pitching on an extra day's rest), allowing six runs (five earned) in 3 2/3 innings to the Detroit Tigers, as the Yankees, who had already lost Derek Jeter for the rest of the postseason in Game 1 due to a fractured ankle, were swept in four games. On October 25, 2012, Sabathia underwent arthroscopic surgery on his left elbow to remove a bone spur which had been affecting him since his tenure with Cleveland. Despite dealing with the bone spur, Sabathia's overall record in his first four years with Yankees were stellar, posting a 74–29 record with a 3.22 ERA and 1.18 WHIP, throwing 905 innings over 129 starts (88 of which were quality), nine complete games, striking out 821 batters against 246 walks, and giving up just 820 hits and 77 home runs (thereby equating to a seasonal average of 32 starts (22 quality), 18 wins, 226 innings pitched, allowing 205 hits and 62 walks, notching 205 strikeouts, giving up 19 home runs, and posting rates of 0.77 HR/9, 2.45 BB/9, 8.16 K/9, 3.34 K/BB and a .241 opponent batting average).

==== 2013–2015: Seasons of struggle ====
On April 1, 2013, Sabathia made his eighth consecutive Opening Day start (and fifth for the Yankees), allowing four earned runs in five innings in an 8–2 loss to the Boston Red Sox. On July 3, Sabathia collected his 200th career win against the Minnesota Twins. His season ended early due to a strained hamstring. He finished with a 14–13 record and a then-career-worst 4.78 ERA in 211 innings across 32 starts.

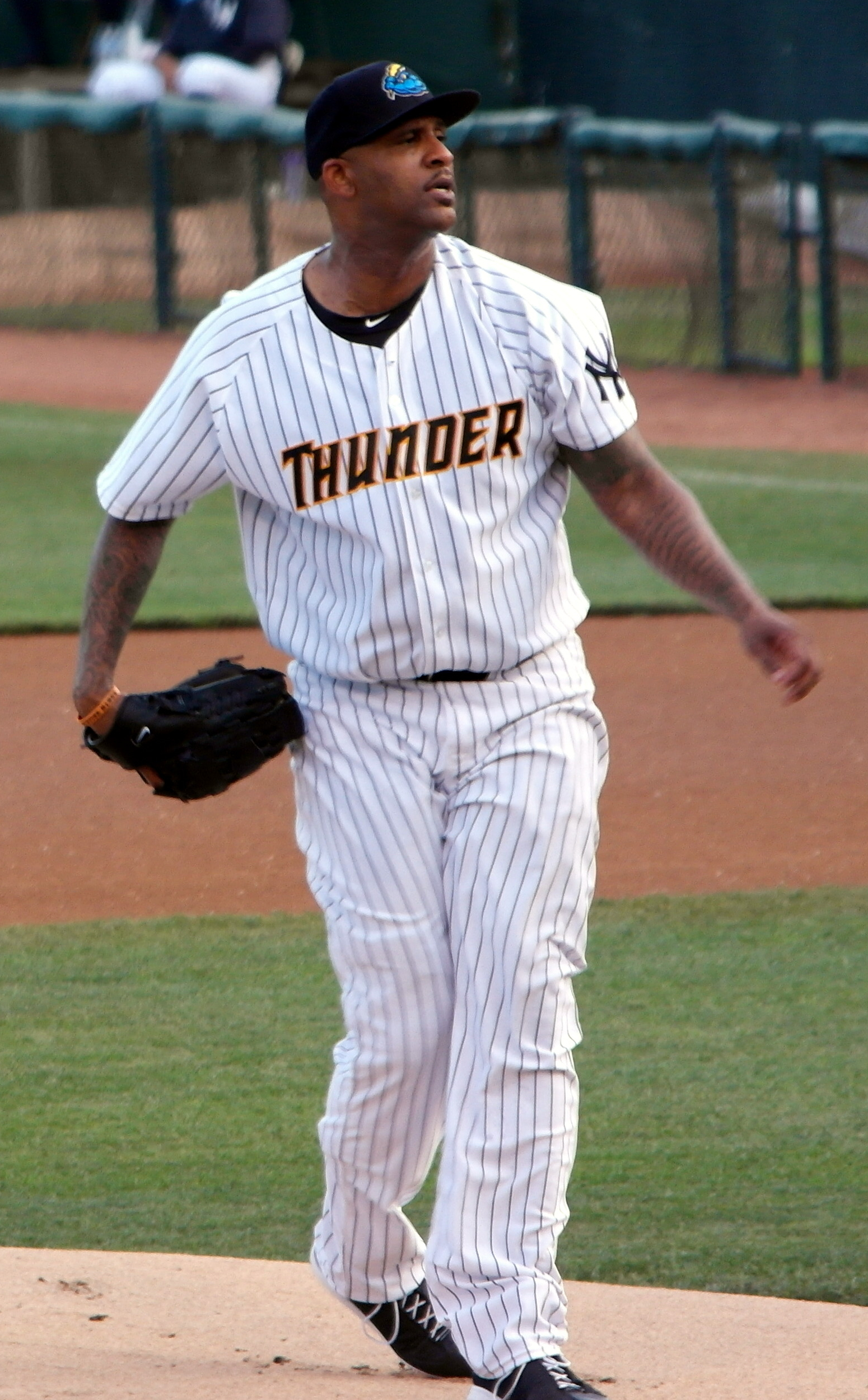
Sabathia in July 2014 during a minor-league rehabilitation appearance

Sabathia lost 40 pounds (18 kg) in 2013 and arrived at spring training in 2014 weighing 275 pounds (125 kg). He admitted to crash dieting after a cousin of his died of heart disease in December 2012. His season was plagued by right knee difficulties. On July 16, it was announced that his season had ended. In only eight starts, Sabathia went 3–4 with a 5.28 ERA. He underwent knee surgery on July 23.

In 2015, Sabathia reported to spring training weighing 305 pounds (138 kg), as he believed his decreased weight had contributed to his poor and injury-shortened 2014 season. During a game against the Angels on June 7, 2015, Sabathia recorded his 2,500th career strikeout, becoming the 31st pitcher in MLB history to reach that milestone.

Sabathia went on the disabled list on August 23, 2015, with right knee soreness. He had a 4–9 record with a 5.27 ERA in 24 games started to that point. He returned to the Yankees on September 9 wearing a knee brace. He pitched to a 2.17 ERA in five starts after returning, including winning the game that clinched the Yankees a playoff berth in the 2015 American League Wild Card Game. However, he missed that game after checking himself into an alcohol rehabilitation facility; the Yankees would go on to lose to the Houston Astros. Sabathia finished the season with a 6–10 record in 29 starts with a 4.73 ERA in 167 1/3 innings.

==== 2016–2019: Late-career resurgence ====
The 2016 season was a season of improvement for Sabathia. On April 9, 2016, Sabathia picked up the win in his season debut after limiting the Detroit Tigers to three earned runs in six innings. On May 6, Sabathia was placed on the 15-day disabled list due to a left groin strain. On May 20, Sabathia recorded his 100th win as a Yankee in an 8–3 victory over the Oakland Athletics, going six innings, allowing one run and striking out eight. Making 30 starts in 2016, Sabathia finished 9–12 with a 3.91 ERA in 179 2/3 innings (16 quality starts) with 152 strikeouts and a 1.32 WHIP. Sabathia's 2016 improvement was credited, in part, to his continued use of an effective knee brace. On October 11, Sabathia underwent a routine surgery on his right knee. The Yankees did not appear in the 2016 postseason.

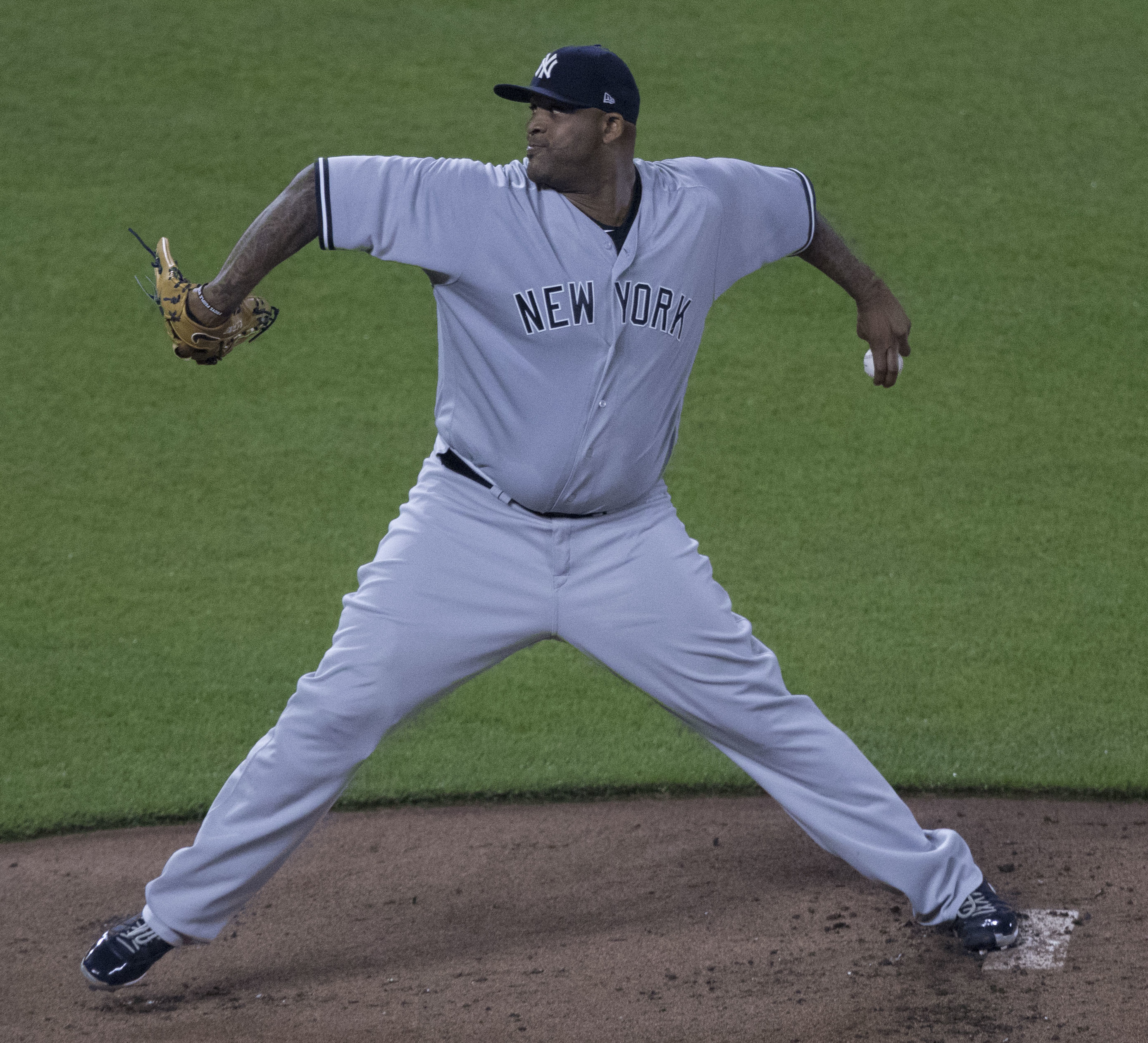
Sabathia in 2017

Sabathia experienced a career renaissance in 2017, transitioning successfully from being a pitcher who relied on power and velocity to one who relied on command and pinpoint control. On June 13, Sabathia injured his left hamstring; he was placed on the disabled list two days later. He returned on July 4, starting against the Toronto Blue Jays at Yankee Stadium. On August 1, Sabathia made his 500th career start in a losing effort against the Detroit Tigers. On August 8, he was taken out of a game after the third inning after experiencing pain in his surgically repaired right knee; he later landed on the 10-day disabled list. After returning from the disabled list on August 19, he went 5–0 over his last eight starts as he helped the Yankees clinch a wild card spot. Sabathia finished the 2017 season 14–5 with a 3.69 ERA, 120 strikeouts and a 1.27 WHIP in 148 2/3 innings (27 starts).

In the 2017 playoffs, Sabathia started Games 2 and 5 of the ALDS against the Cleveland Indians. In Game 2, he gave up two earned runs in 5 1/3 innings of a Yankees loss. In Game 5, he struck out nine in 4 1/3 innings, and the Yankees won, advancing to the ALCS for the first time since 2012. Sabathia started Game 3 of the ALCS against the Houston Astros, earning the win after throwing six shutout innings and allowing only three hits. Sabathia also started Game 7 of the ALCS; he took the loss as the Astros defeated the Yankees, 4–0, to win the series in seven games. The Astros went on to win the 2017 World Series.

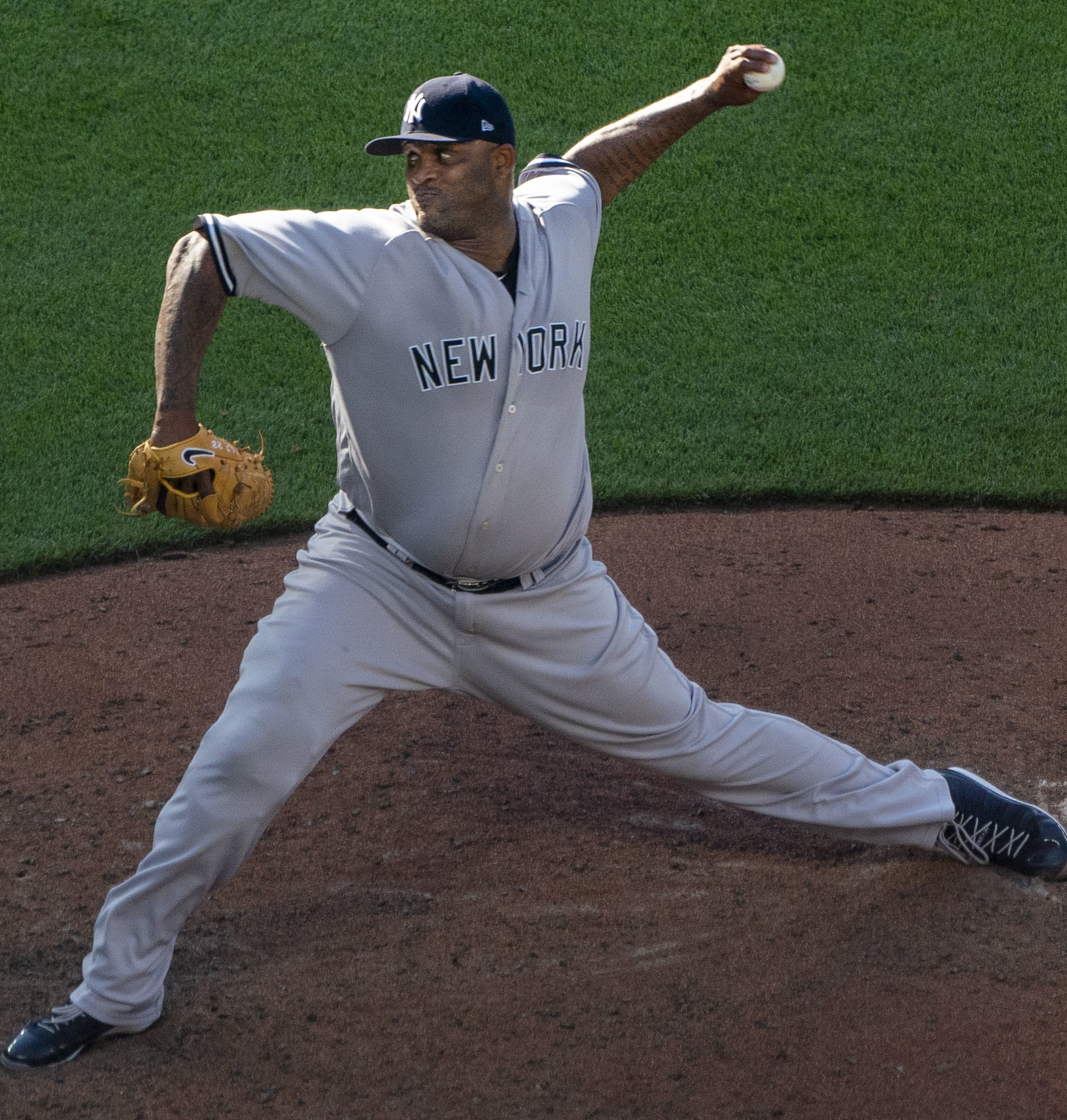
Sabathia in July 2018

On December 26, 2017, Sabathia re-signed with the Yankees on a one-year contract for $10 million for the 2018 season. On June 12, 2018, Sabathia recorded his 1,500th strikeout as a Yankee in a 3–0 win over the Washington Nationals, joining Andy Pettitte, Whitey Ford, Ron Guidry and Red Ruffing on the list of pitchers with 1,500 strikeouts as Yankees. On August 13, Sabathia went back on the disabled list due to right knee inflammation. Sabathia was ejected on September 27, 2018, for intentionally hitting Rays catcher Jesús Sucre with a pitch; the Rays' Andrew Kittredge had previously thrown at Yankee Austin Romine's head in retaliation for Sabathia having hit the Rays' Jake Bauers on the arm earlier in the game. Sabathia received a five-game suspension for throwing at Sucre, to be served in 2019. He was set to receive a $500,000 bonus for pitching 155 innings, but finished 2 innings short because of the ejection; the Yankees paid the bonus out nevertheless. Sabathia ended the season with a 9–7 record and a 3.65 ERA in 29 starts.

The Yankees defeated the Oakland Athletics in the 2018 American League Wild Card Game to advance to the 2018 American League Division Series against the rival Boston Red Sox. Sabathia started Game 4 of the ALDS and took the loss, giving up three runs in three innings. The Red Sox won the game, 4–3, to defeat the Yankees three games to one. The Red Sox went on to win the 2018 World Series.

On November 7, 2018, Sabathia re-signed with the Yankees on a one-year contract for $8 million. Sabathia was cleared to begin working out in January 2019 following a December 2018 procedure to insert a stent into his heart. On February 16, 2019, he announced that 2019 would be his final season.

==== 2019: Final season ====
Sabathia began the 2019 season on the 10-day injured list as he continued to recover from heart surgery. He made his first start of the season on April 13, pitching five innings of one-hit baseball in a 4–0 victory over the Chicago White Sox. On April 30, 2019, he recorded his 3,000th strikeout against John Ryan Murphy of the Arizona Diamondbacks, becoming only the third left-handed pitcher to record 3,000 strikeouts. Sabathia was placed on the 10-day injured list on May 23 due to right knee inflammation. He received a cortisone shot to treat the pain, and was informed that he would need knee replacement surgery after his baseball career ended. On June 19, he recorded his 250th career win in a 12–1 win over the Tampa Bay Rays. Sabathia pitched six innings, struck out seven, and surrendered one run. Sabathia accepted an invitation to appear in the 2019 MLB All-Star Game in Cleveland to throw the ceremonial first pitch; during the game, he made a mound visit to Yankees closer Aroldis Chapman. On July 28, Sabathia again went on the 10-day injured list due to the same knee injury. On August 31, Sabathia was placed on the 10-day injured list for the third time in 2019. On September 18, he made his last Yankee Stadium regular-season pitching appearance, receiving a standing ovation from the home crowd. He finished the season with a 5–8 record and a 4.95 ERA in 23 games (22 starts).

Sabathia was not named to the Yankees' 25-man roster for the 2019 American League Division Series against the Minnesota Twins. However, he was later activated on the Yankees' roster for the 2019 American League Championship Series against the Houston Astros, as a reliever. Sabathia pitched in the eighth inning of Game 4 of the American League Championship Series. He threw 20 pitches, retired two batters with a line-out, hit batsman, and flyout, but after taking George Springer to a 2-1 count, he could not finish the inning due to discomfort and, after a warm-up pitch, walked off the mound. The Yankees removed Sabathia from their roster the next day with a subluxated left shoulder, and replaced him with Ben Heller. This move rendered Sabathia ineligible to pitch in the World Series had the Yankees advanced. Sabathia told the media that his exit from the game in his announced final season was "kind of fitting. I threw until I couldn't anymore."

On October 21, 2019, Sabathia officially announced his retirement from baseball with the following Twitter message: "It all started in Vallejo, CA, in my grandma's backyard throwing grapefruits at a folding chair. I could have never imagined how much this game has meant to me since. Through the ups and downs, baseball has always been my home. From Cleveland, to Milwaukee, New York, and everywhere in between, I'm so thankful to have experienced this journey with every teammate past and present. All I ever wanted was to be a great teammate and win. I'm so proud of this year's team, we fought 'til the end. Love you guys! I'm going to miss going out there on the mound and competing, but it's time to say farewell. Thank you, Baseball." Sabathia finished his eleven-year tenure with the Yankees with a 134–88 record (a .604 winning percentage) in 307 games (306 starts), a 3.81 ERA and 1.272 WHIP, and 1,700 strikeouts in 1,918 innings pitched.

== Post-playing career ==
On April 6, 2022, Sabathia was hired by Major League Baseball to serve as a special assistant to commissioner Rob Manfred. In the 2025 ballot the National Baseball Hall of Fame and Museum, Sabathia was inducted in his first year of eligibility. Later that year, on July 27, Sabathia was officially inducted into the Hall of Fame in a ceremony at Cooperstown, New York.

On February 25, 2026, the Yankees announced they would retire Sabathia's No. 52 jersey and dedicate a plaque in Monument Park in his honor on September 26 of that year. Due to inclement weather, the team announced on the morning of September 24 that Saturday's game would be moved up to part of a day-night doubleheader, with the ceremony moved to Friday afternoon.

== Awards and highlights ==
CC Sabathia's number 52 was retired by the New York Yankees in 2026.

- 6× All-Star selection (2003, 2004, 2007, 2010–2012)
- World Series champion (2009)
- ALCS MVP (2009)
- AL Cy Young Award (2007)
- 3x Warren Spahn Award recipient (2007–2009)
- 2× MLB wins leader (2009, 2010)
- 2× AL shutouts leader (2006, 2008)
- NL shutouts leader (2008)
- 3,000 strikeout club

== Player profile ==
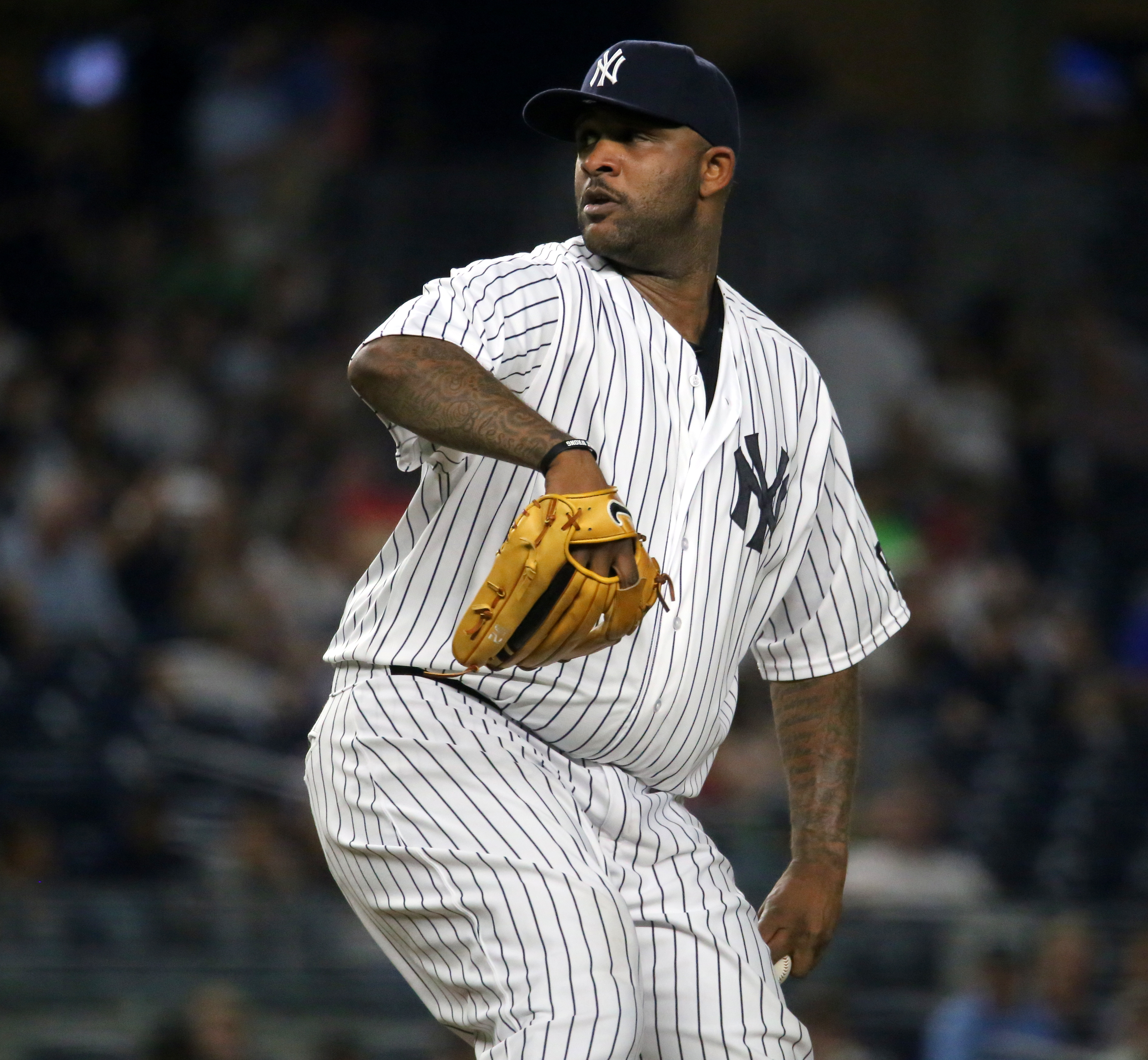
Sabathia pitching in September 2016

In August 2017, Sabathia became the all-time American League leader in strikeouts by a left-handed pitcher. At the time of his retirement following the 2019 season, he led all active Major League players in career wins, career innings pitched and career strikeouts. During his peak from 2005 to 2012, Sabathia was the winningest pitcher in major league baseball. He posted a cumulative record of 137–67 (.672) with a 3.24 ERA (including five straight seasons of 17+ wins from 2007 to 2011), threw 1,788 1/3 innings and struck out 1,614 batters (averaging more than 220 innings pitched and 200 strikeouts per season), started 257 games and posted 173 quality starts, finished in the top five of the Cy Young voting five times, received four All Star berths, and recorded a 3.26 FIP, 135 ERA+, 40.8 bWAR, and 43.6 fWAR. Sabathia was one of the most dominant pitchers in the vicennial (twenty year) period of 2000 to 2020; posting more wins, games started, innings pitched, and strikeouts than any other major league pitcher during that time period.

Although he pitched and batted left-handed, Sabathia is actually right-handed. He said that he started throwing a ball with his left hand at the age of two with the help and advice of his father.

As a hitter, Sabathia acquired 25 hits in 121 at-bats (127 plate appearances) for a .207 batting average. On June 21, 2008, Sabathia hit a 440-foot home run off of Los Angeles Dodgers pitcher Chan Ho Park. On July 13, 2008, in his second game with the Brewers, Sabathia hit his second home run of the season off Cincinnati Reds pitcher Homer Bailey, becoming the third pitcher in history to homer in both leagues in the same season and the first since Earl Wilson did it in 1970 with Detroit and San Diego.

Sabathia's reputation of pitching a high number of effective innings each season led to sports broadcasters often referring to him as a workhorse; discounting his injury-shortened 2014 campaign Sabathia averaged over 200 innings a season in his career (he reached the benchmark eight times, including seven consecutive seasons of at least 200 innings pitched from 2007 to 2013).

== Personal life ==
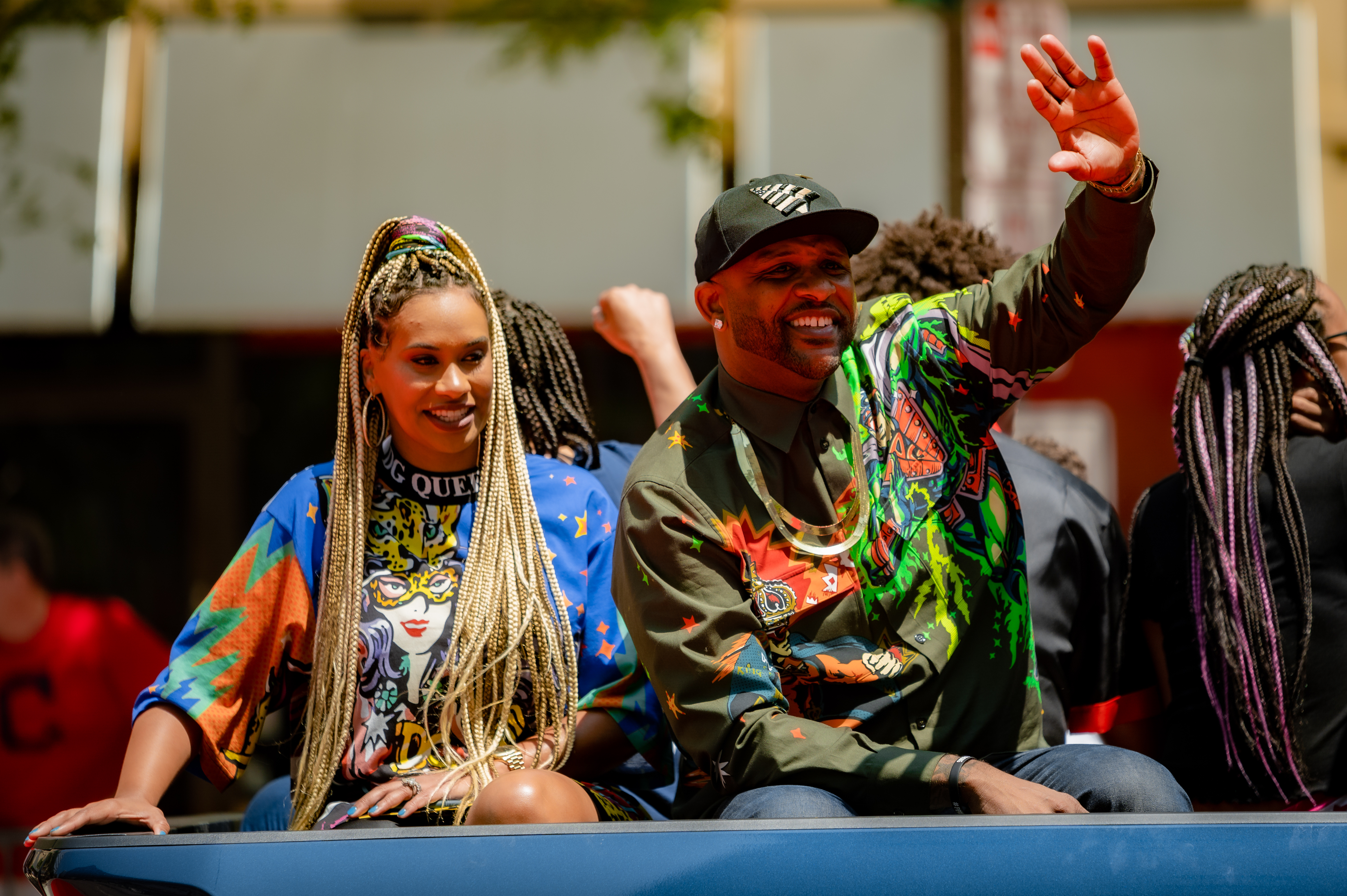
Sabathia with his wife in 2019

Sabathia and his wife, Amber, have four children: a son Carsten Charles III (born 2003), a daughter (born 2005), a second daughter (born 2008), and a second son (born 2010). The family lived in Fairfield, California outside his hometown of Vallejo near San Francisco until he signed with the Yankees. Then the family moved to Alpine, New Jersey. Nevertheless, Sabathia remains connected to his hometown. In January 2012, Vallejo High School honored Sabathia by declaring "CC Sabathia Day" and renaming the school's baseball field in his honor; Sabathia's PitCCh In Foundation had helped to renovate the field. The PitCCh In Foundation is a charity that supports inner city children. In 2014, the foundation supported a team of runners in the 2014 New York City Marathon.

On October 5, 2015, Sabathia announced that he was checking himself into Silver Hill Hospital, an alcohol treatment center. During the previous weekend, Sabathia had been binge drinking in the hotel while the Yankees were on the road in Baltimore; he had also been drinking in the clubhouse after a game that had been cancelled due to rain. "'I love baseball and I love my teammates like brothers,' said Sabathia in a statement, 'and I am also fully aware that I am leaving at a time when we should all be coming together for one last push toward the World Series. It hurts me deeply to do this now, but I owe it to myself and to my family to get myself right. I want to take control of my disease, and I want to be a better man, father and player.'" In March 2016, Sabathia opened up about his battle with alcoholism in an essay for The Players' Tribune.

In July 2017, Sabathia started the R2C2 podcast with co-host Ryan Ruocco as part of The Players' Tribune. In May 2018, the podcast moved to the UNINTERRUPTED podcast network.

In December 2018, after developing shortness of breath and other symptoms, Sabathia underwent a cardiac catheterization and was found to have a blockage of a coronary artery. A stent was placed to open the blockage. After his heart scare, Sabathia undertook a major exercise and diet program, losing 60 pounds (27 kg) from his peak weight.

In 2021, Sabathia's original team, the Cleveland Indians, dedicated a Cleveland baseball field in his honor, named "CC Sabathia Field at Luke Easter Park" (Easter himself also being a former Indian).

Sabathia's son, Carsten III, played college baseball for Georgia Tech and Houston, and collegiate summer baseball for the Brewster Whitecaps, Martha's Vineyard Sharks, and Trenton Thunder, between 2023 and 2025. Carsten III was drafted by the Milwaukee Brewers in the 20th round (611th overall) of the 2026 Major League Baseball draft. On July 21, 2026, the same day as Sabathia's birthday, he signed with the Brewers.

== See also ==
- Black Aces, African-American pitchers with a 20-win MLB season
- Cleveland Guardians award winners and league leaders
- List of Major League Baseball annual wins leaders
- List of Major League Baseball annual shutout leaders
- List of Major League Baseball career batters faced leaders
- List of Major League Baseball career games started leaders
- List of Major League Baseball career hit batsmen leaders
- List of Major League Baseball career innings pitched leaders
- List of Major League Baseball career strikeout leaders
- List of Major League Baseball career wins leaders

Awards and achievements
Preceded by Bartolo Colón; Jake Westbrook	Cleveland Indians Opening Day; Starting pitcher 2003–2004; 2006–2008	Succeeded by Jake Westbrook; Cliff Lee
Preceded by Chien-Ming Wang	New York Yankees Opening Day; Starting pitcher 2009–2014	Succeeded by Masahiro Tanaka
Preceded by José Contreras	American League Pitcher of the Month; May 2006	Succeeded by Johan Santana
Preceded by Dan Haren	National League Pitcher of the Month; July 2008, August 2008	Succeeded by Johan Santana
