= List of Major League Baseball career innings pitched leaders =

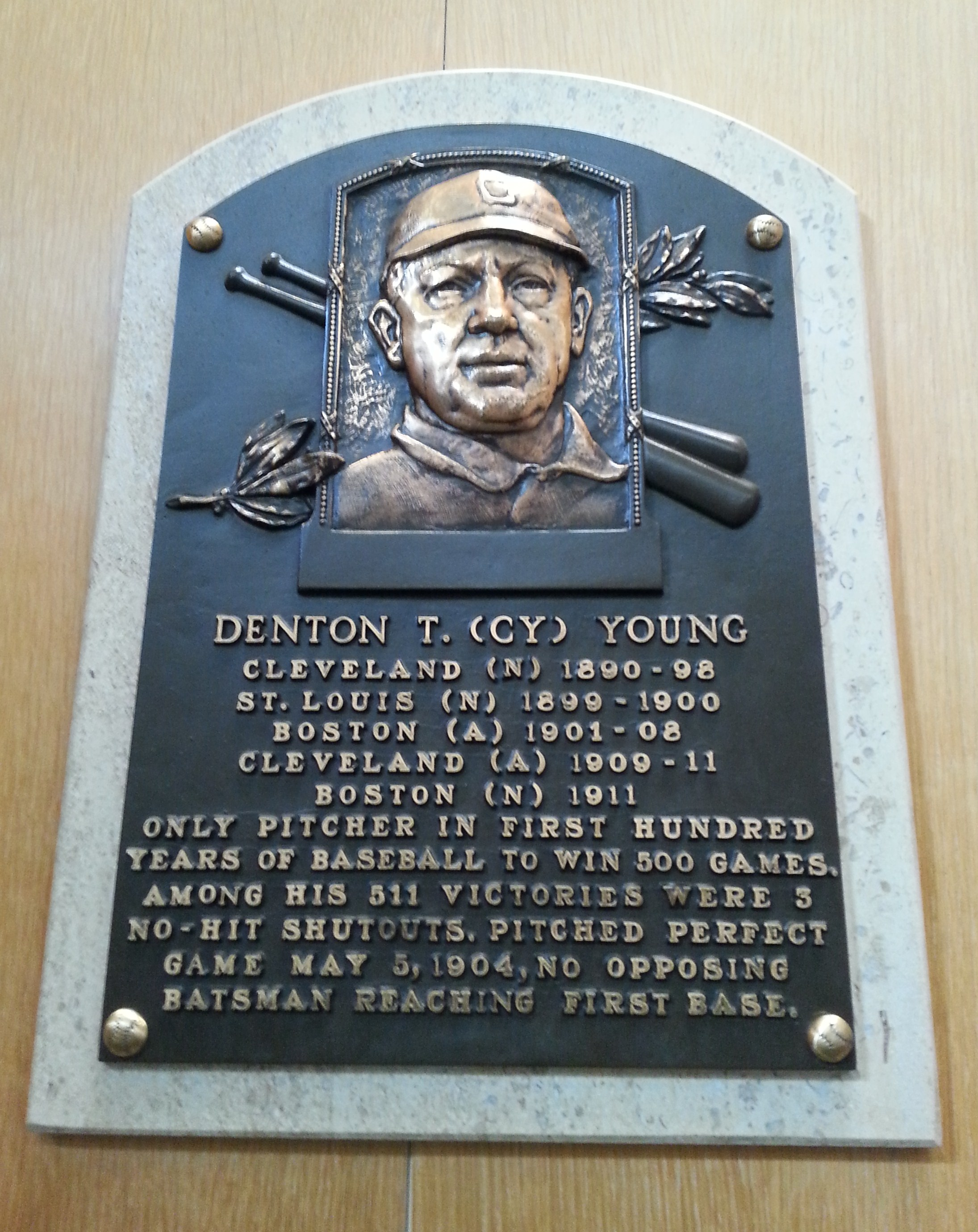
Cy Young, the all-time leader in innings pitched.

In baseball, innings pitched (IP) are the number of innings a pitcher has completed, measured by the number of batters and baserunners that are taken out while the pitcher is on the pitching mound during a game. Three outs made are equal to one inning pitched. One out counts as one-third of an inning, and two outs count as two-thirds of an inning.

This is a list of the top 100 Major League Baseball pitchers who have accumulated the most innings pitched of all time.

Cy Young is the all-time leader in innings pitched with 7,356, and the only pitcher to throw more than 7,000 innings. Pud Galvin is the only other pitcher in MLB history to throw more than 6,000 innings.

== Key ==
Rank	Rank amongst leaders in career innings pitched. A blank field indicates a tie.
Player	Name of Player
IP	Total career innings pitched. Current total in parentheses ()
*	Denotes elected to National Baseball Hall of Fame.
	Denotes active player

== List ==
- Stats updated as of September 27, 2026.

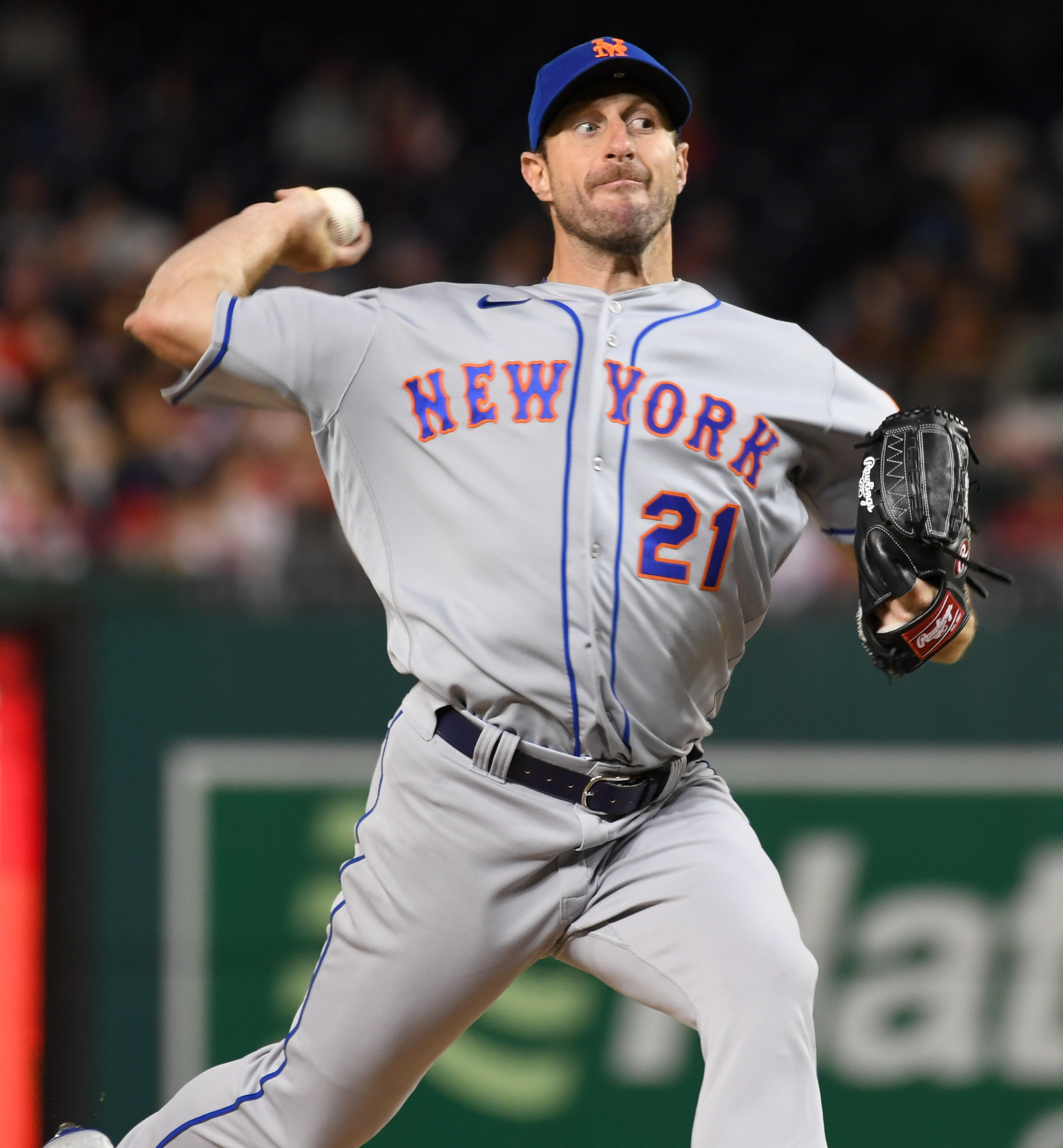
Max Scherzer, the active leader in career innings pitched and 132nd all-time.

Rank	Player (2026 IPs)	IP
1	Cy Young*	7,356
2	Pud Galvin*	6,003.1
3	Walter Johnson*	5,914.1
4	Phil Niekro*	5,404
5	Nolan Ryan*	5,386
6	Gaylord Perry*	5,350
7	Don Sutton*	5,282.1
8	Warren Spahn*	5,243.2
9	Steve Carlton*	5,217.2
10	Grover Cleveland Alexander*	5,190
11	Kid Nichols*	5,067.1
12	Tim Keefe*	5,049.2
13	Greg Maddux*	5,008.1
14	Bert Blyleven*	4,970
15	Bobby Mathews	4,956
16	Roger Clemens	4,916.2
17	Mickey Welch*	4,802
18	Christy Mathewson*	4,788.2
19	Tom Seaver*	4,783
20	Tommy John	4,710.1
21	Robin Roberts*	4,688.2
22	Early Wynn*	4,564
23	John Clarkson*	4,536.1
24	Tony Mullane	4,531.1
25	Jim Kaat*	4,530.1
26	Charles Radbourn*	4,527.1
27	Ferguson Jenkins*	4,500.2
28	Eddie Plank*	4,495.2
29	Eppa Rixey*	4,494.2
30	Tom Glavine*	4,413.1
31	Jack Powell	4,389
32	Red Ruffing*	4,344
33	Gus Weyhing	4,337
34	Jim McCormick	4,275.2
35	Frank Tanana	4,188.1
36	Burleigh Grimes*	4,180
37	Ted Lyons*	4,161
38	Randy Johnson*	4,135.1
39	Red Faber*	4,086.2
40	Jamie Moyer	4,074
41	Dennis Martínez	3,999.2
42	Vic Willis*	3,996
43	Jim Palmer*	3,948
44	Lefty Grove*	3,940.2
45	Jack Quinn	3,920.1
46	Bob Gibson*	3,884.1
47	Sad Sam Jones	3,883
48	Jerry Koosman	3,839.1
49	Bob Feller*	3,827
50	Jack Morris*	3,824

Rank	Player (2026 IPs)	IP
51	Charlie Hough	3,801.1
52	Amos Rusie*	3,778.2
53	Waite Hoyt*	3,762.1
54	Jim Bunning*	3,760.1
55	Bobo Newsom	3,759.1
56	George Mullin	3,686.2
57	Jerry Reuss	3,669.2
58	Paul Derringer	3,645
59	Mickey Lolich	3,638.1
60	Tommy Bond	3,628.2
61	Bob Friend	3,611
62	Carl Hubbell*	3,590.1
63	Joe Niekro	3,584.1
64	CC Sabathia*	3,577.1
65	Justin Verlander	3,576.2
66	Herb Pennock*	3,571.2
67	Earl Whitehill	3,564.2
68	Mike Mussina*	3,562.2
69	Rick Reuschel	3,548.1
70	Will White	3,542.2
71	Adonis Terry	3,514.1
72	Juan Marichal*	3,507
73	Jim Whitney	3,496.1
74	Luis Tiant	3,486.1
75	Wilbur Cooper	3,480
76	John Smoltz*	3,473
77	Bartolo Colón	3,461.2
78	Claude Osteen	3,460.2
79	Catfish Hunter*	3,449.1
80	Joe McGinnity*	3,441.1
81	David Wells	3,439
82	Don Drysdale*	3,432
83	Mel Harder	3,426.1
84	Charlie Buffinton	3,404
85	Hooks Dauss	3,390.2
86	Zack Greinke	3,389.1
87	Clark Griffith*	3,385.2
88	Doyle Alexander	3,367.2
89	Chick Fraser	3,364
90	Al Orth	3,354.2
91	Curt Simmons	3,348.1
92	Vida Blue	3,343.1
93	Andy Pettitte	3,316
94	Rube Marquard*	3,306.2
	Billy Pierce	3,306.2
96	Kenny Rogers	3,302.2
97	Dennis Eckersley*	3,285.2
	Jim Perry	3,285.2
99	Mark Buehrle	3,283.1
100	Larry Jackson	3,262.2

== See also ==
- List of Major League Baseball career games started leaders
- List of Major League Baseball career wins leaders
