= List of Major League Baseball career games started leaders =

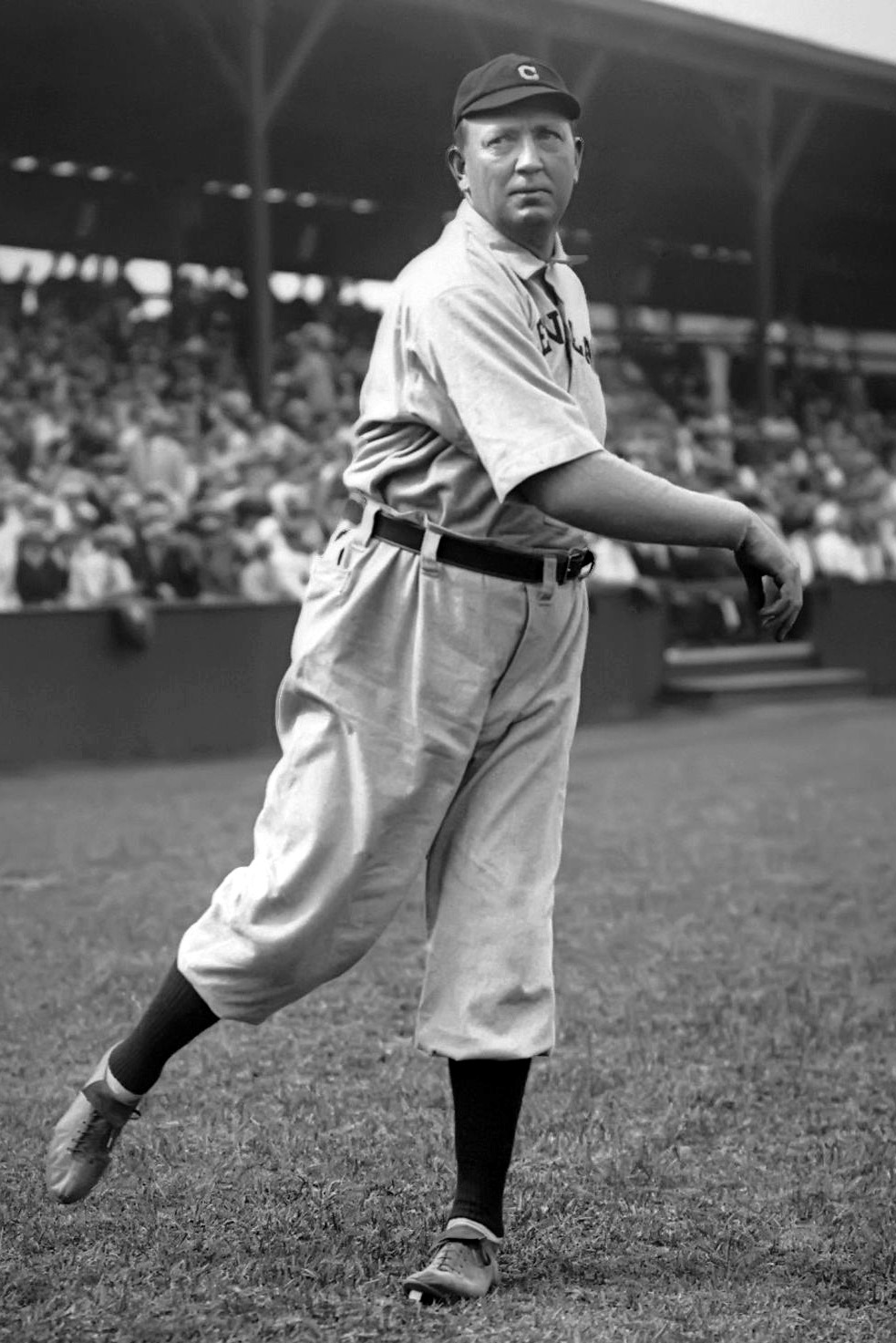
Cy Young, the all-time leader in career starts

In baseball statistics, a pitcher is credited with a game started (denoted by GS) if he is the first pitcher to pitch for his team in a game.

Cy Young holds the Major League Baseball games started record with 815. Young is the only pitcher in MLB history to start more than 800 career games. Nolan Ryan (773), Don Sutton (756), Greg Maddux (740), Phil Niekro (716), Steve Carlton (709), Roger Clemens (707), and Tommy John (700) are the only other pitchers to have started 700 or more games their career.

== Key ==
**Rank**	Rank amongst leaders in career wins. A blank field indicates a tie.
**Player (2026 GS)**	Number of games started during the 2026 Major League Baseball season
**GS**	Total career games started
*	Denotes elected to National Baseball Hall of Fame.
**Bold**	Denotes active player. (Note: A player is considered inactive if he has announced his retirement or has not played for a full season.)

== List ==
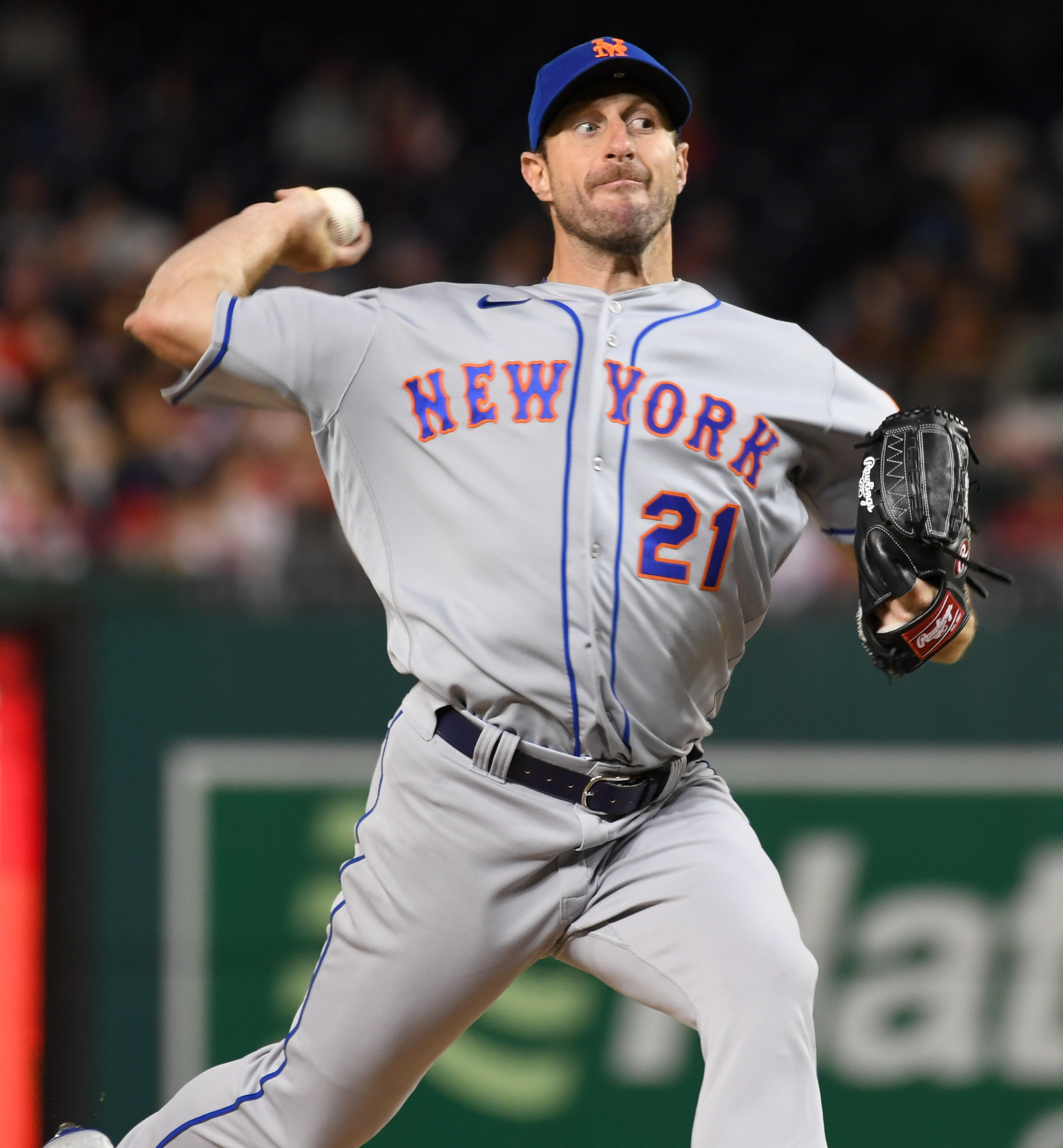
Max Scherzer, the active leader in career games started and 55th all-time.

- Stats updated as of September 27, 2026.

Rank	Player (2026 GS)	GS
1	Cy Young*	815
2	Nolan Ryan*	773
3	Don Sutton*	756
4	Greg Maddux*	740
5	Phil Niekro*	716
6	Steve Carlton*	709
7	Roger Clemens	707
8	Tommy John	700
9	Gaylord Perry*	690
10	Pud Galvin*	688
11	Bert Blyleven*	685
12	Tom Glavine*	682
13	Walter Johnson*	666
14	Warren Spahn*	665
15	Tom Seaver*	647
16	Jamie Moyer	638
17	Jim Kaat*	625
18	Frank Tanana	616
19	Early Wynn*	612
20	Robin Roberts*	609
21	Randy Johnson*	603
22	Grover Cleveland Alexander*	600
23	Ferguson Jenkins*	594
	Tim Keefe*	594
25	Bobby Matthews	568
26	Dennis Martínez	562
27	Kid Nichols*	561
28	CC Sabathia*	560
29	Justin Verlander	557
30	Eppa Rixey*	554
31	Bartolo Colón	552
	Christy Mathewson*	552
33	Mickey Welch*	549
34	Jerry Reuss	547
35	Zack Greinke	541
36	Red Ruffing*	538
37	Mike Mussina*	536
38	Eddie Plank*	529
	Rick Reuschel	529
40	Jerry Koosman	527
	Jack Morris*	527
42	Jim Palmer*	521
	Andy Pettitte	521
44	Jim Bunning*	519
45	John Clarkson*	518
46	Jack Powell	516
47	Gus Weyhing	505
48	Tony Mullane	504
49	Charlie Radbourn*	503
50	Joe Niekro	500

Rank	Player (2026 GS)	GS
51	Bob Friend	497
	Burleigh Grimes*	497
53	Mickey Lolich	496
54	Mark Buehrle	493
55	**Max Scherzer (18)**	492
56	David Wells	489
57	Claude Osteen	488
58	Sad Sam Jones	487
59	Jim McCormick	485
60	Bob Feller*	484
	Ted Lyons*	484
	Luis Tiant	484
63	Red Faber*	483
	Bobo Newsom	483
65	Bob Gibson*	482
66	John Smoltz*	481
67	Tim Hudson	479
68	Kevin Brown	476
	Catfish Hunter*	476
70	Liván Hernández	474
	Kenny Rogers	474
72	Vida Blue	473
	Earl Whitehill	473
74	Vic Willis*	471
75	Chuck Finley	467
76	Orel Hershiser	466
77	Don Drysdale*	465
	Milt Pappas	465
79	Doyle Alexander	464
80	Tim Wakefield	463
81	Curt Simmons	462
	Bob Welch	462
83	Mike Torrez	458
84	Lefty Grove*	457
	Juan Marichal*	457
86	Rick Wise	455
87	Clayton Kershaw	451
	Jon Lester	451
89	Jim Perry	447
90	John Lackey	446
91	Paul Derringer	445
92	Kevin Millwood	443
	Jack Quinn	443
	Javier Vázquez	443
95	Charlie Hough	440
	Mike Moore	440
97	Whitey Ford*	438
98	Curt Schilling	436
99	Mel Harder	433
	Carl Hubbell*	433
	Billy Pierce	433
