= Chicago Pirates all-time roster =

List of baseball players

The Chicago Pirates were a professional baseball team based in Chicago, Illinois, that played in the Players' League for one season in 1890. The franchise used South Side Park as its home field. During their only season, the team finished fourth in the PL with a 75-62 record.

== Players ==
Key to symbols in player table
§	Player was a player-manager
†	Inducted into the National Baseball Hall of Fame and Museum

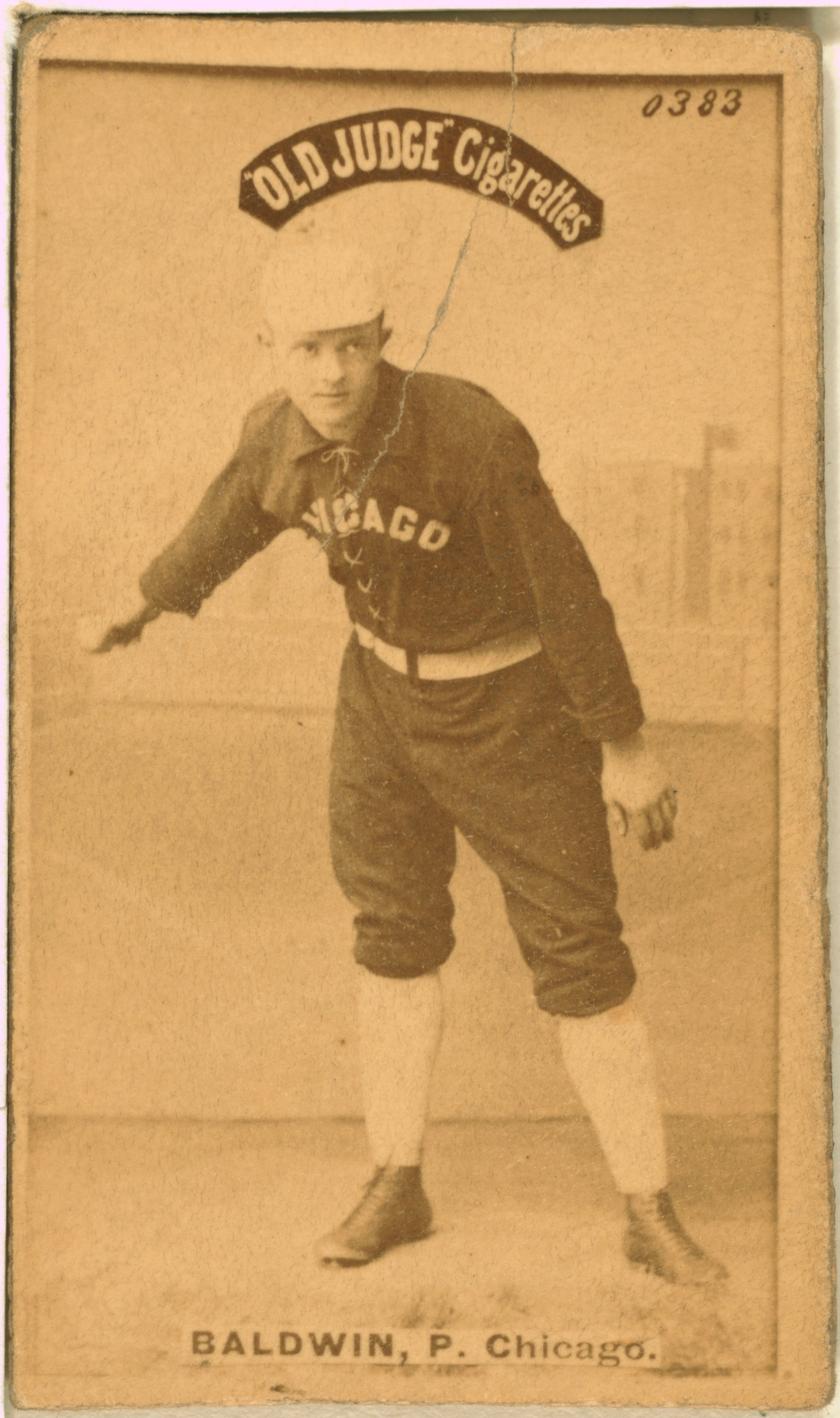
Mark Baldwin led the Players' League in several pitching categories.

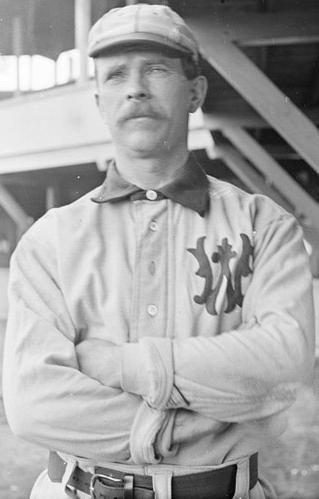
Center fielder Jimmy Ryan was one of the Pirates' best hitters.

Players who played for the Chicago Pirates, primary position played, and season(s) played for franchise
Player	Position(s)	Season(s)	Notes	Ref
Mark Baldwin	Pitcher	1890	Baldwin led the Players' League in innings pitched (492), wins (33), and strikeouts (206).	
Charlie Bartson	Pitcher	1890		
Charlie Bastian	Shortstop	1890		
Jack Boyle	Catcher / Third baseman	1890		
Charlie Comiskey^{§†}	First baseman	1890	Comiskey, the Pirates' first baseman and manager, was eventually elected into the Baseball Hall of Fame.	
Dell Darling	First baseman / Shortstop	1890		
Hugh Duffy^{†}	Right fielder	1890	Duffy led the Players' League in hits (191) and runs scored (161) and was elected into the Baseball Hall of Fame.	
Frank Dwyer	Pitcher	1890		
Duke Farrell	Catcher	1890		
Silver King	Pitcher	1890	In 1890, King pitched 461 innings, won 30 games, and led the Players' League in earned run average (2.69).	
Arlie Latham	Third baseman	1890		
Tip O'Neill	Left fielder	1890		
Fred Pfeffer	Second baseman	1890		
Jimmy Ryan	Center fielder	1890	Ryan led the Pirates in batting average (.340) and runs batted in (89).	
Frank Shugart	Shortstop	1890		
Ned Williamson	Third baseman	1890		
