= 1890 Chicago Pirates season =

1890 Chicago Pirates
- League: Players' League
- Ballpark: South Side Park
- City: Chicago
- Record: 75–62 (.547)
- League place: 4th
- Owner: John Addison
- Manager: Charlie Comiskey

The 1890 Chicago Pirates baseball team was a member of the short lived Players' League. They compiled a 75–62 record, good for fourth place, ten games behind the league champion Boston Reds. After the season, the league folded, and the Pirates were bought out by the Chicago Colts.

== Regular season ==
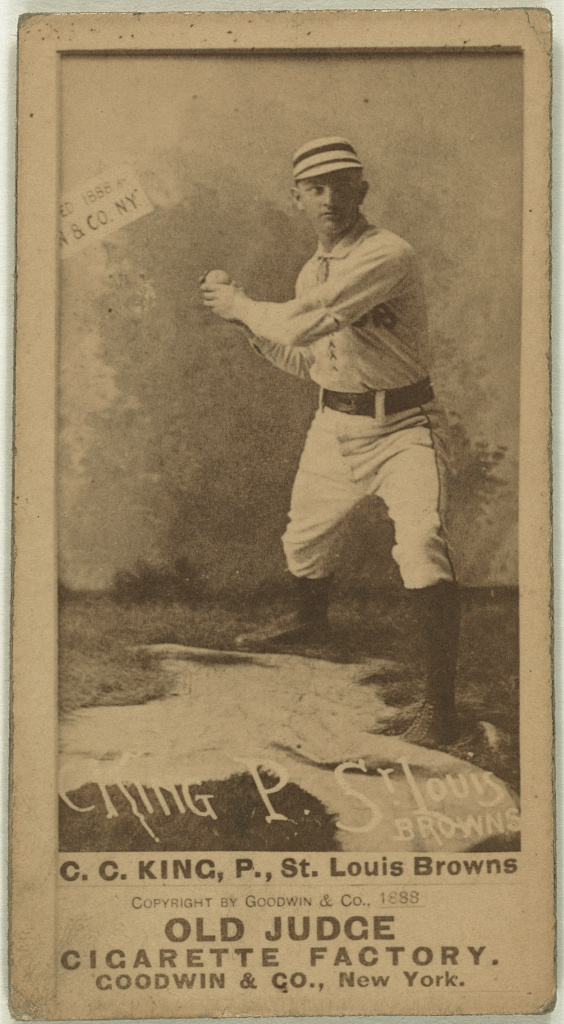
Pitcher Silver King

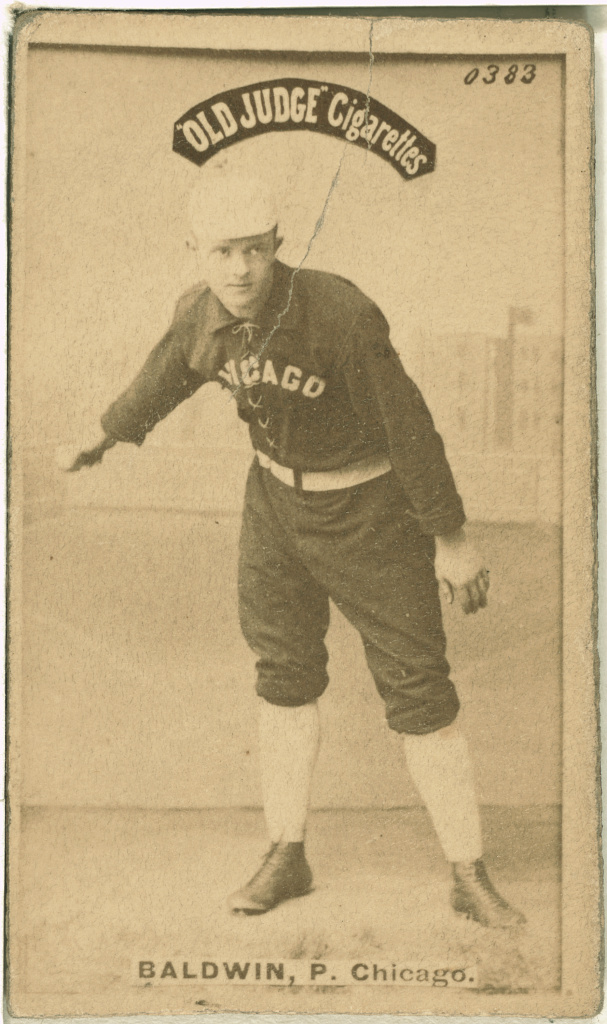
Pitcher Mark Baldwin

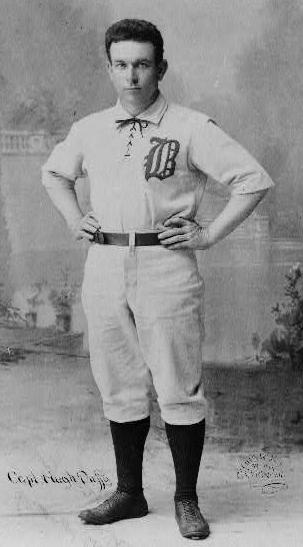
Right fielder Hugh Duffy

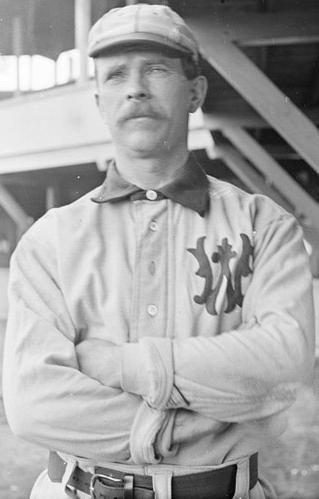
Center fielder Jimmy Ryan

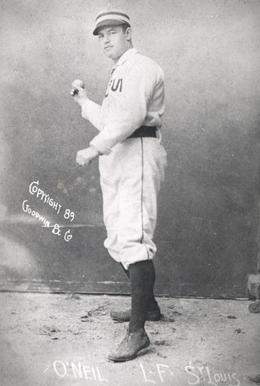
Left fielder Tip O'Neill

=== Season standings ===
Players' League
Team	W	L	Pct.	GB	Home	Road
Boston Reds	81	48	.628	—	48‍–‍21	33‍–‍27
Brooklyn Ward's Wonders	76	56	.576	6½	46‍–‍19	30‍–‍37
New York Giants	74	57	.565	8	47‍–‍19	27‍–‍38
Chicago Pirates	75	62	.547	10	46‍–‍23	29‍–‍39
Philadelphia Athletics	68	63	.519	14	35‍–‍30	33‍–‍33
Pittsburgh Burghers	60	68	.469	20½	37‍–‍28	23‍–‍40
Cleveland Infants	55	75	.423	26½	31‍–‍30	24‍–‍45
Buffalo Bisons	36	96	.273	46½	23‍–‍42	13‍–‍54

=== Record vs. opponents ===
1890 Players' League record Sources:
Team	BSR	BKW	BUF	CPI	CLI	NYK	PHQ	PBU
Boston	—	11–7	14–6–1	12–8	12–8	12–8	10–6	10–5
Brooklyn	7–11	—	12–6–1	10–9	12–8	7–10	14–6	14–6
Buffalo	6–14–1	6–12–1	—	5–15	7–9	3–17	4–16	5–13
Chicago	8–12	9–10	15–5	—	13–7	9–9–1	10–10	11–9
Cleveland	8–12	8–12	9–7	7–13	—	8–11	8–11–1	7–9
New York	8–12	10–7	17–3	9–9–1	11–8	—	5–12	14–6
Philadelphia	6–10	6–14	16–4	10–10	11–8–1	12–5	—	7–12
Pittsburgh	5–10	6–14	13–5	9–11	9–7	6–14	12–7	—

=== Roster ===
1890 Chicago Pirates
Roster
Pitchers: Mark Baldwin; Charlie Bartson; Frank Dwyer; Silver King; Catchers: Jack Boyle; Duke Farrell	Infielders: Charlie Bastian; Charlie Comiskey; Dell Darling; Arlie Latham; Fred Pfeffer; Frank Shugart; Ned Williamson	Outfielders: Hugh Duffy; Tip O'Neill; Jimmy Ryan	Manager: Charlie Comiskey

== Player stats ==
=== Batting ===
==== Starters by position ====
Note: Pos = Position; G = Games played; AB = At bats; H = Hits; Avg. = Batting average; HR = Home runs; RBI = Runs batted in

Pos	Player	G	AB	H	Avg.	HR	RBI
C	Duke Farrell	117	451	131	.290	2	84
1B	Charlie Comiskey	88	377	92	.244	0	59
2B	Fred Pfeffer	124	499	128	.257	5	80
3B	Arlie Latham	52	214	49	.229	1	20
SS	Charlie Bastian	80	283	54	.191	0	29
OF	Hugh Duffy	137	596	191	.320	7	82
OF	Jimmy Ryan	118	486	165	.340	6	89
OF	Tip O'Neill	137	577	174	.302	3	75

==== Other batters ====
Note: G = Games played; AB = At bats; H = Hits; Avg. = Batting average; HR = Home runs; RBI = Runs batted in

Player	G	AB	H	Avg.	HR	RBI
Jack Boyle	100	369	96	.260	1	49
Ned Williamson	73	261	51	.195	2	26
Dell Darling	58	221	57	.258	2	39
Frank Shugart	29	106	20	.189	0	15

=== Pitching ===
==== Starting pitchers ====
Note: G = Games pitched; IP = Innings pitched; W = Wins; L = Losses; ERA = Earned run average; SO = Strikeouts

Player	G	IP	W	L	ERA	SO
Mark Baldwin	59	501.0	34	24	3.31	211
Silver King	56	461.0	30	22	2.69	185
Charlie Bartson	25	188.0	8	10	4.26	47

==== Other pitchers ====
Note: G = Games pitched; IP = Innings pitched; W = Wins; L = Losses; ERA = Earned run average; SO = Strikeouts

Player	G	IP	W	L	ERA	SO
Frank Dwyer	12	69.1	3	6	6.23	17
