= List of Major League Baseball career hit batsmen leaders =

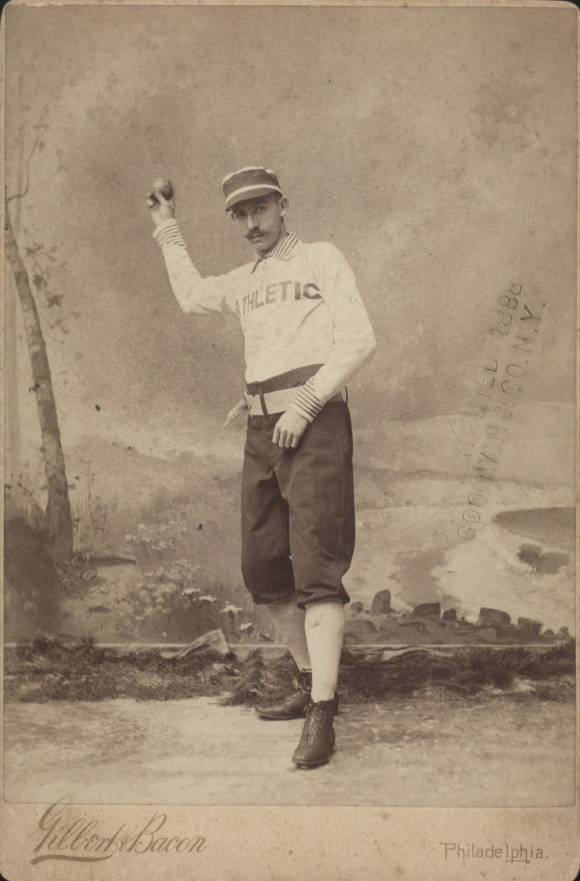
Gus Weyhing, the all-time leader in career hit batsmen.

In baseball, hit by pitch (HBP) is a situation in which a batter or his clothing or equipment (other than his bat) is struck directly by a pitch from the pitcher; the batter is called a hit batsman (HB). A hit batsman is awarded first base, provided that (in the plate umpire's judgment) he made an honest effort to avoid the pitch, although failure to do so is rarely called by an umpire. Being hit by a pitch is often caused by a batter standing too close to, or "crowding", home plate.

This is a list of the top 100 Major League Baseball pitchers who have the most hit batsmen of all time.

Gus Weyhing (277) holds the record for most hit batsmen in a career. Chick Fraser (219), Pink Hawley (210), Walter Johnson (205), and Charlie Morton (200) are the only other pitchers to hit 200 or more batters in their careers.

As of September 23, 2026, the active leader and 25th all-time is Chris Sale with 145 hit batsmen.

== Key ==
**Rank**	Rank amongst leaders in career hit batsmen. A blank field indicates a tie.
**Player (2027 HB)**	Number of batters hit during the 2027 Major League Baseball season.
**HB**	Total career batters hit
*	Denotes elected to National Baseball Hall of Fame.
**Bold**	Denotes active player. (HB in previous season) (Note: A player is considered inactive if he has announced his retirement or has not played for a full season.)

== List ==
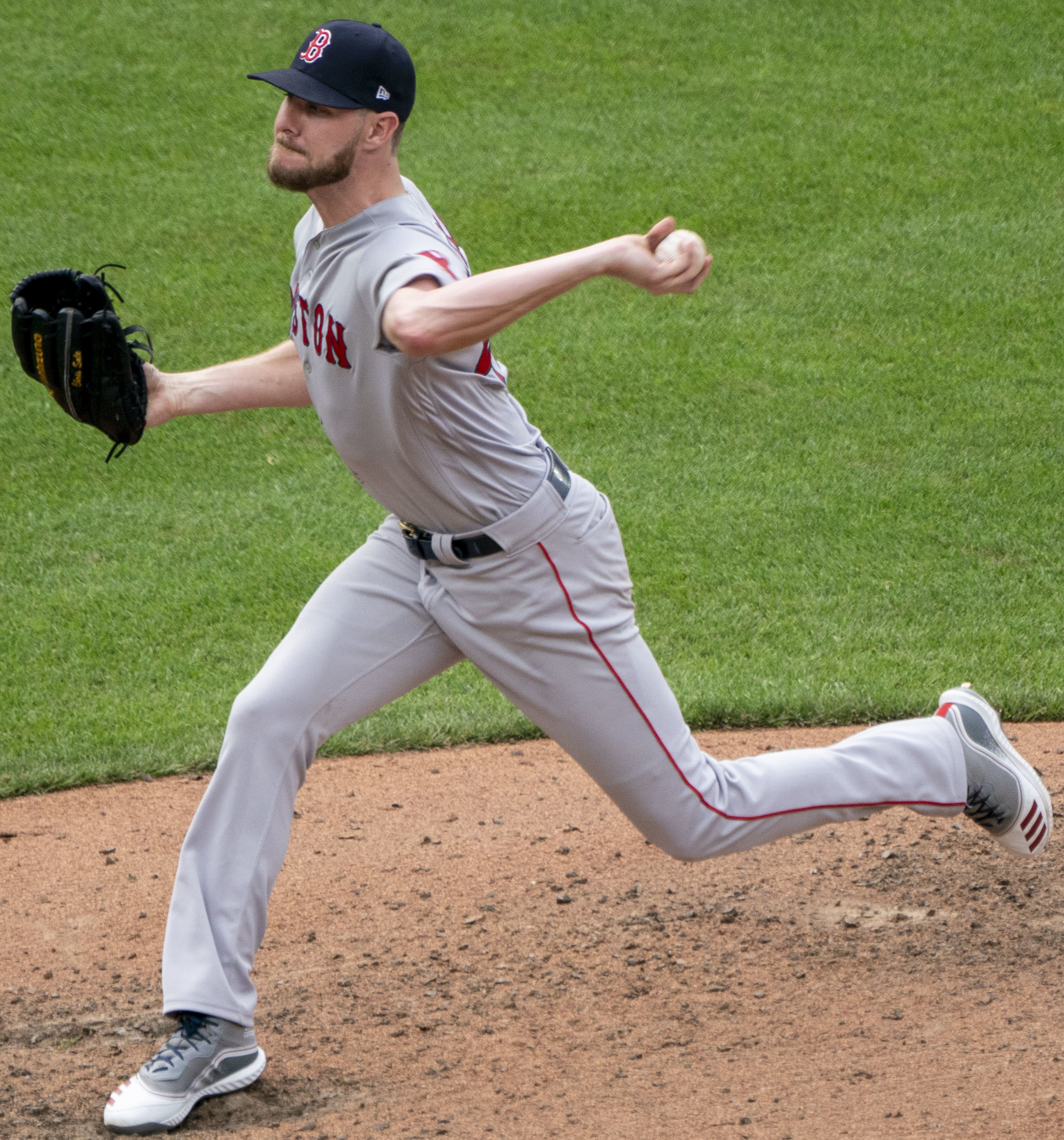
Chris Sale, the active leader in hit batsmen and 25th all-time.

- Stats updated as of 2026 season.

Rank	Player (2027 HB)	HB
1	Gus Weyhing	277
2	Chick Fraser	219
3	Pink Hawley	210
4	Walter Johnson*	205
5	Charlie Morton	200
6	Randy Johnson*	190
	Eddie Plank*	190
8	Tim Wakefield	186
9	Tony Mullane	185
10	Joe McGinnity*	179
11	Charlie Hough	174
12	Clark Griffith*	171
13	Cy Young*	161
14	Jim Bunning*	160
15	Roger Clemens	159
16	Nolan Ryan*	158
17	Vic Willis*	156
18	Bert Blyleven*	155
	Jamey Wright	155
20	Don Drysdale*	154
21	Bert Cunningham	148
	Adonis Terry	148
23	Silver King	146
	Jamie Moyer	146
25	**Chris Sale (0)**	145
26	Win Mercer	144
27	A. J. Burnett	143
28	Frank Foreman	142
29	Ed Doheny	141
	Pedro Martínez*	141
31	Kevin Brown	139
	Red Ehret	139
33	Chan Ho Park	138
34	Howard Ehmke	137
	Greg Maddux*	137
36	Phil Knell	136
37	John Lackey	133
38	Matt Kilroy	131
39	George Mullin	130
	Jesse Tannehill	130
41	Kid Nichols*	129
	Dave Stieb	129
	Frank Tanana	129
44	Kenny Rogers	127
45	Jack Taylor	126
46	Kid Carsey	125
	Willie Sudhoff	125
48	Tim Hudson	124
	Jeff Weaver	124
50	Mark Baldwin	123

Rank	Player (2027 HB)	HB
	Phil Niekro*	123
	CC Sabathia*	123
53	Jim Kaat*	122
	Dennis Martínez	122
55	Hooks Dauss	121
	Justin Verlander	121
57	**Johnny Cueto (0)**	120
	Jack Powell	120
	Doc White	120
60	Orel Hershiser	117
	Darryl Kile	117
	Al Leiter	117
63	**Max Scherzer (0)**	116
64	Rube Waddell*	115
65	Jack Warhop	114
66	Ice Box Chamberlain	113
	Jack Chesbro*	113
	Red Donahue	113
	George Uhle	113
70	Amos Rusie*	112
	Aaron Sele	112
72	Pedro Astacio	111
73	Vicente Padilla	109
74	Gaylord Perry*	108
	Billy Rhines	108
76	Ed Reulbach	107
77	David Cone	106
	Earl Moore	106
79	Bronson Arroyo	105
	**Chris Bassitt (0)**	105
	Félix Hernández	105
	Jim Lonborg	105
	Jeff Pfeffer	105
	Ed Willett	105
85	Barney Pelty	104
	Ervin Santana	104
87	Scott Erickson	103
	Red Faber*	103
	Randy Wolf	103
90	Chief Bender*	102
	Bob Gibson*	102
	Tom Hughes	102
	Carlos Zambrano	102
94	Frank Dwyer	101
	Burleigh Grimes*	101
	Earl Whitehill	101
97	Wilbur Cooper	100
	Cole Hamels	100
99	Bob Caruthers	99
	Jack Stivetts	99
	Kerry Wood	99

== See also ==
- List of Major League Baseball career bases on balls allowed leaders
