= Charlie Bartson =

American baseball player (1865–1936)

- Pitcher
- Born: March 13, 1865; Peoria, Illinois, U.S.
- Died: June 9, 1936 (aged 71); Peoria, Illinois, U.S.
- Batted: Unknown Threw: Unknown

MLB debut
- May 14, 1890, for the Chicago Pirates

Last MLB appearance
- September 16, 1890, for the Chicago Pirates

MLB statistics
- Win–loss record: 9–10
- Earned run average: 4.11
- Strikeouts: 52
- Stats at Baseball Reference

Teams
- Chicago Pirates (1890)

Charles Franklin Bartson (March 13, 1865 – June 9, 1936) was an American professional baseball pitcher who played for the Chicago Pirates of the Players' League (PL) during the 1890 baseball season. Over his PL career, Bartson pitched to a 9–10 win–loss record with an earned run average of 4.11 and 52 strikeouts. After his PL career, he formed a Western Association team in Peoria, Illinois, and served as Republican Central Committee chairman in the city. He died of heart disease on June 9, 1936.

== Biography ==
Charles Franklin Bartson was born on March 13, 1865, in Peoria, Illinois. Bartson began his professional career for the Omaha Omahogs of the Western League in 1887, when he also played for the St. Joseph Reds of the same league. Combined, Bartson had a 11–18 win–loss record with a 5.08 earned run average (ERA) over 253.1 innings pitched. As a batter, Bartson had a .259 batting average with 35 hits and 18 runs scored. In 1888, Bartson played for the Buffalo Bisons of the International Association for Professional Base Ball Players and the Peoria Canaries of the Central Interstate League. In 1889, he struck out 12 Chicago White Stockings players of the National League (NL) in an exhibition game. He spent the 1889 season with the Peoria club. Jimmy Ryan, a player on Chicago's roster who struck out three times against Bartson, remembered his name when the Chicago Pirates of the Players' League (PL) searched for additional pitchers in 1890.

Bartson made his PL debut for the Pirates on May 14, 1890, in a game against the Buffalo Bisons that Chicago won 4–1. In July, Bartson was traded to Buffalo to help their pitching staff, though he voided the trade, a condition possible under league structure. Bartson reasoned it was better to pitch once a week for a good team than once every three days for a bad one. He played his final PL game on September 16, 1890. Pirates manager Charles Comiskey recommended him for release after Bartson got drunk and verbally abused Cap Anson, so much so that police had to remove Bartson from the grounds, in a NL game Bartson attended during an off-day; Comiskey stated "his work was not of such a kind as to warrant his retention" anyway.

Bartson did not make many starts with Chicago, as pitchers Mark Baldwin and Silver King started 113 of the club's 138 total games. He finished the year with 20 games started, an ERA of 4.11, and a 9–10 win–loss record, while having a batting average of .167 with 13 hits over 90 plate appearances. According to author Ed Koszarek, his pitching numbers were indicative of being a "third reserve pitcher on a staff", and were far below the Pirates' level, and his batting numbers were below normal for a pitcher.

After the season, he played for the Quincy Ravens of the Illinois–Iowa League (IIL), the Minneapolis Millers of the Western Association (WA), and the St. Paul Apostles/Duluth Whalebacks of the WA in 1891. In 1892, Bartson recorded a 17–13 win–loss record and a 1.30 ERA over 242.1 innings pitched for the Rock Island-Moline Twins of the IIL. He continued to play for several Midwestern minor-league teams until his early thirties. Bartson stood at 6 feet 0 inches (183 cm) and weighed 170 pounds (77 kg).

After his professional baseball career, he formed a WA team in Peoria with Ed Dugdale, and later served as president of Peoria Three-I club. In politics, he was a city official in Peoria and served as Republican Central Committee chairman. At the time of his death, he was working for the Empire Cigar Store in the city. Bartson died on June 9, 1936, in Peoria, of heart disease, and is interred at Springdale Cemetery in Peoria.
