= Eddie Boyle =

American baseball player (1874–1941)

- Catcher
- Born: May 8, 1874; Cincinnati, Ohio, U.S.
- Died: February 10, 1941 (aged 66); Cincinnati, Ohio, U.S.
- Batted: Right Threw: Right

MLB debut
- April 17, 1896, for the Louisville Colonels

Last MLB appearance
- September 16, 1896, for the Pittsburgh Pirates

MLB statistics
- At bats: 14
- Home Runs: 0
- Batting average: .000
- Stats at Baseball Reference

Teams
- Louisville Colonels (1896); Pittsburgh Pirates (1896)

Edward Joseph Boyle (May 8, 1874 – February 10, 1941) was an American catcher in Major League Baseball who played for the Louisville Colonels and the Pittsburgh Pirates during the 1896 season. Listed at 6' 3", 200 lb., Boyle batted and threw right-handed. He was born in Cincinnati, Ohio. His older brother, Jack Boyle, also played in the majors.

In a one-season career, Boyle went hitless in 14 at-bats in five games (.000). In five catching appearances, he committed two errors in 22 chances for a .909 fielding percentage. Boyle started with Atlanta in 1893. He also played for Sioux City and St. Paul, both managed by Charles Comiskey. Another one of Boyle's manager, Connie Mack, said that Eddie was the most accurate catcher of the day. Boyle retired due to a foot ailment. He opened Eddie Boyle's Café at 1134 W. 8th St in Cincinnati, not far from his brother Jack's Cafe at 7th and Central. He worked at the Cafe with his wife Winnifred until his death in 1941.

Boyle died in his homeland of Cincinnati, Ohio at the age of 66. He was the brother of Jack Boyle and the uncle of Buzz Boyle and Jimmy Boyle.
