= Mark Baldwin (baseball) =

American baseball player (1863–1929)

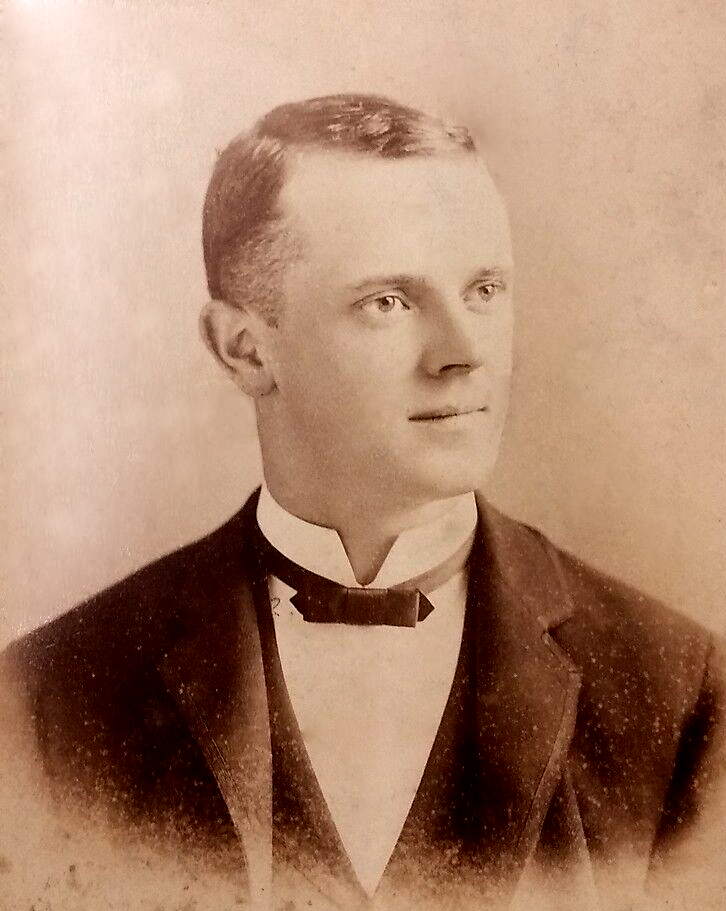
- Baldwin photographed in c. 1890
- Pitcher
- Born: October 29, 1863; Pittsburgh, Pennsylvania, U.S.
- Died: November 10, 1929 (aged 66); Pittsburgh, Pennsylvania, U.S.
- Batted: Right Threw: Right

MLB debut
- May 2, 1887, for the Chicago White Stockings

Last MLB appearance
- September 30, 1893, for the New York Giants

MLB statistics
- Win–loss record: 154–165
- Earned run average: 3.37
- Strikeouts: 1,349
- Stats at Baseball Reference

Teams
- Chicago White Stockings (1887–1888); Columbus Solons (1889); Chicago Pirates (1890); Pittsburgh Pirates (1891–1893); New York Giants (1893)

Career highlights and awards
- 1889 AA leader in innings pitched (513 2/3), losses (34), strikeouts (368), and walks (274); 1890 PL leader in complete games (53), wins (33), strikeouts (209), and walks (249); Holds MLB single-season wild pitches record (83)

Marcus Elmore Baldwin (October 29, 1863 – November 10, 1929), nicknamed "Fido" and "Baldy", was an American professional baseball player who pitched seven seasons in Major League Baseball (MLB). In 346 career games, he pitched to a 154–165 win–loss record with 295 complete games. Baldwin set the single-season MLB wild pitches record with 83 that still stands today.

Born in Pittsburgh, Pennsylvania, Baldwin made his professional debut for a Cumberland, Maryland, team in 1883. Though signed by Chicago White Stockings president Albert Spalding to pitch against the St. Louis Browns in the 1886 World Series, Baldwin did not play after the Browns objected. He made his MLB debut for the White Stockings in 1887, when a writer for the Oshkosh Daily Northwestern called him the "swiftest pitcher in the National League" (NL). Released by Chicago player–manager Cap Anson, he signed with the Columbus Solons of the American Association (AA) in 1889, where he led the league in innings pitched (513 2/3), losses (34), strikeouts (368), and walks (274).

In 1889, Baldwin, described as "intelligent and outspoken", recruited players for the Chicago Pirates of the Players' League (PL). Baldwin played for Chicago and finished the year as the PL leader in games played as a pitcher (58), innings pitched (492), wins (33), strikeouts (206), complete games (53), and walks (249), as the Pirates finished fourth in the league, ten games behind the first-place Boston Reds. A PL historian has described him as a star of the league. Back in the NL, he signed with the Pittsburgh Pirates, where he played from 1891 to 1893. Baldwin was arrested after the Homestead strike in 1892 and charged with aggravated riot, but never received a trial. He finished his MLB career with the New York Giants in 1893, and played several seasons for independent teams afterwards.

During his career, he batted and threw right-handed, weighed 190 pounds (86 kg), and stood 6 feet (180 cm) tall. After baseball, Baldwin became a physician and practiced at Passavant Hospital in Pittsburgh. He died of cardiorenal disease on November 10, 1929, and is interred at Allegheny Cemetery.

== Early life ==
Marcus Elmore Baldwin was born in Pittsburgh, Pennsylvania, on October 29, 1863, to Franklin E. and Margaret Baldwin. One of two children born to the couple, Mark and his family moved to Homestead, Pennsylvania in 1872. Franklin, a real estate speculator, previously worked as a steelworker and a nailer. As a child, Mark wanted to be a physician. Mark started to pitch for amateur Homestead teams in 1880, and, after high school, attended Pennsylvania State College (PSC), later renamed Pennsylvania State University.

== Professional career ==
Baldwin made his professional debut for a team in Cumberland, Maryland, in 1883, while he attended PSC. Two years later, he pitched for McKeesport, who finished first in the Western Pennsylvania League. According to an 1891 article in The Pittsburgh Press, he earned $2 (equivalent to $70 in 2024) per game for pitching for McKeesport. (Note: Inflation calculations cited to the following source:) According to another article in the Press, Baldwin had asked Pittsburgh Alleghenys secretary Scandrett for a tryout, and president William A. Nimick consented, but manager Horace Phillips opposed the idea and a tryout never happened. Instead, Scandrett wrote a letter recommending Baldwin to Duluth management. According to an article in the Pittsburgh Daily Post, McKeesport manager Frank Torreyson recommended him to Duluth of the Northwestern League in spring 1886 as a third baseman, but the Duluth Jayhawks played him as a pitcher as their pitching was weak.

On June 18, 1886, Baldwin struck out 18 batters, 12 successively, against the St. Paul Freezers. Baldwin had 19 strikeouts in 12 innings in a 4–3 loss at Oshkosh, Wisconsin on September 13, 1886. According to a friend of Baldwin, when Duluth fined Baldwin for poor play, he intentionally performed poorly until Duluth revoked the fine. According to a Pittsburgh Daily Post writer, Duluth won its league pennant due "chiefly on account of Baldwin's pitching". After a tryout, Chicago White Stockings president Albert Spalding signed Baldwin to a contract on October 20 to replace injured rookie Jocko Flynn: Chicago wanted Baldwin to play in the 1886 World Series (which ran from October 18 to 23), but the opposing St. Louis Browns objected, so Baldwin never played.

=== Chicago White Stockings (1887–88) ===
Baldwin listed his birthdate when he played for Chicago in 1887 as 1867, which followed a theme of childishness and "extreme petulance" in him according to baseball historian David Nemec. In spring training prior to the 1887 season, a hotel employee found Baldwin and Tom Daly unconscious in their room, which smelled of gas. Either Daly or Baldwin accidentally blew out a flame in a gas light. Baldwin almost died, but both were revived. In preparation for the year, Baldwin joined Chicago during spring training in Hot Springs, Arkansas. Though in March 1887, Baldwin "expected to rank next to [John] Clarkson" among Chicago's pitchers, in April, The Sporting News reported Baldwin "[was] regarded in Chicago as little better than a failure". On May 2, Baldwin made his MLB debut against the Indianapolis Hoosiers in a 9–1 Chicago loss.

Later in the month, Baldwin held the Boston Beaneaters to one run in a 3–1 Chicago victory, part of a week in which Baldwin's development surprised a writer for The Post, who discounted the earlier evaluation of Baldwin as a failure. In June, a correspondent for The Clipper complimented Baldwin on his endurance and curveballs, while an Oshkosh Daily Northwestern writer called him the "swiftest pitcher in the National League". Baldwin finished the season with an 18–17 win–loss record, with 164 strikeouts and 122 walks over 334 innings pitched, as Chicago finished 71–50, third in the NL. By December, Baldwin had re-signed with the club.

With the sale of Clarkson to Boston, only White Stockings' player–manager Cap Anson, according to one prediction, believed the team could win a pennant. In a May 30 game against the Washington Nationals, Baldwin sprained a tendon in his right leg, an injury from which he did not return until early July. The White Stockings finished the season second in the NL, nine games behind the New York Giants, with a 77–58 record. Baldwin led his team with 15 losses and 99 walks.

Baldwin played on Spalding's 1888–89 World Tour. In a game seen by 12,000 spectators, Baldwin pitched for the Chicagos against the All-Americas in Melbourne as Chicago won 5–3, breaking a three-game losing streak. A monkey bit Baldwin on a ship on the tour after he fed it pretzels and beer; the bite has been reported in a different source as a serious scratch. On April 24, 1889, Anson released him and three other White Stockings and stated he would rather "take eighth place with [a team of gentlemen] than first with a gang of roughs"; according to Baldwin, Chicago did not restrict alcohol consumption on the tour (team owner Albert Spalding was a "temperance crusader"), and at various banquets Baldwin attended the wine "flowed freely". In addition to his alcohol consumption on the tour, Baldwin stated that after he hinted he would not sign for the salary of the previous season, he was released. Later in the year, Anson cited Baldwin's lack of pitch control as a reason for his release. Baldwin signed with the Columbus Solons of the AA on May 3.

=== Columbus Solons and Chicago Pirates (1889–90) ===
"A year ago when Spalding released him, [Baldwin] declared that the ambition of his life was to play in opposition to Anson's team. He then thought only of a rival national league team and did not dream of a local rival for public patronage. Now that he is with the Chicago Players' team he says his ambition is gratified beyond his most fanciful hope, and he proposes to do all in his power to make his services to the new team valuable."

— A writer for The Chicago Tribune on Baldwin's career after the White Stockings

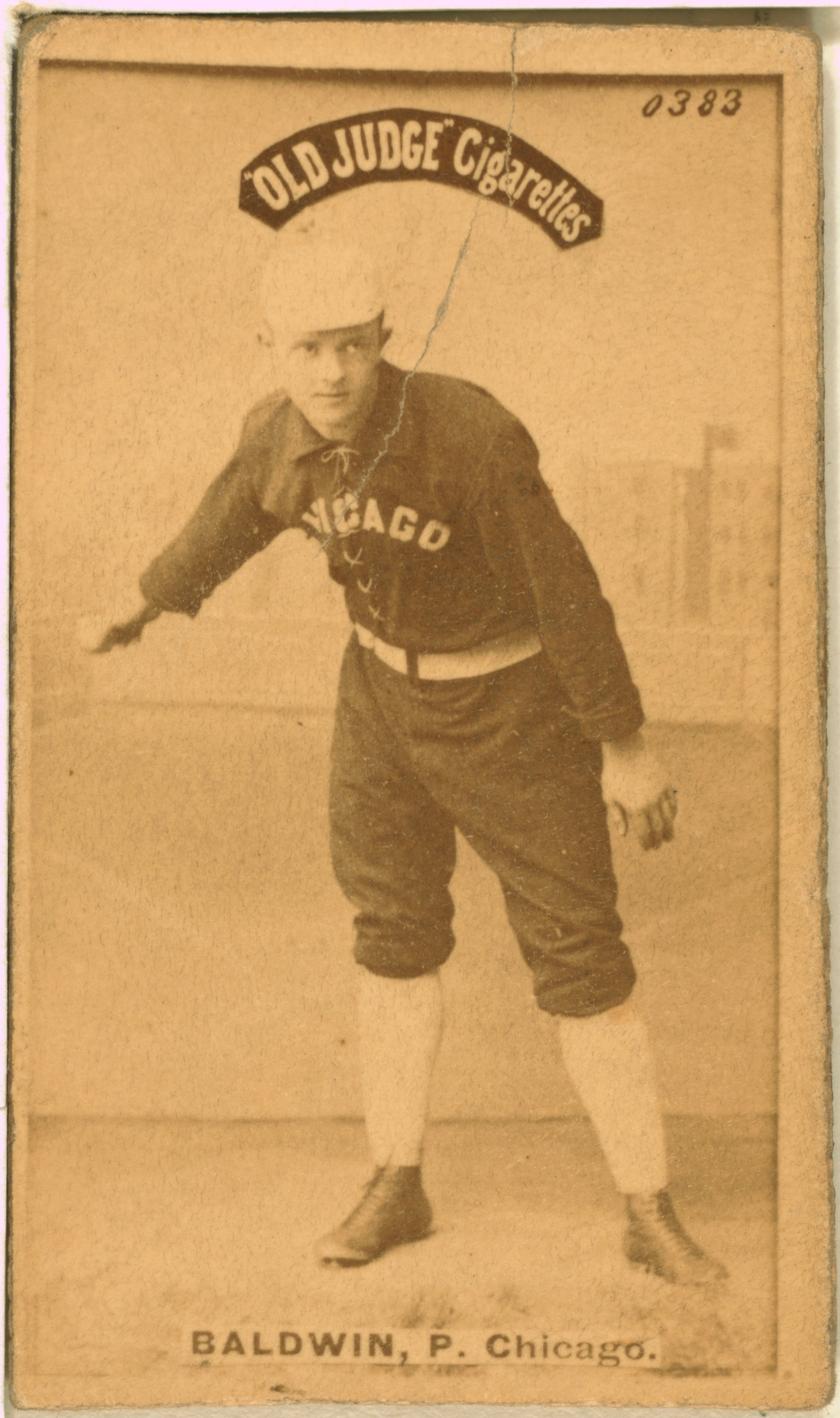
Goodwin & Company tobacco card of Baldwin, c. 1887–1890

Baldwin, who debuted for the Solons on May 4 in a showing described by The Chicago Tribune as "anything but credible," explained his poor opening game as a result of unfamiliarity with AA coaching methods. By late June, a month in which he hit a double, three triples, and a home run over a three-game span, Baldwin was "doing better", according to a writer for The Chicago Tribune. According to a writer for The Saint Paul Globe, Baldwin pitched the "best ball in the [A]ssociation" in July. On August 31, Baldwin set the single-game AA record for strikeouts with 13 against the Browns. In his only season in the AA, Baldwin led the league in innings pitched (513 2/3), losses (34), strikeouts (368), walks (274), and wild pitches (83), the last of which set a major league record that still stands today. Baldwin's 274 walks set a then-MLB record, while his strikeout total is the most post-1886 except for Nolan Ryan, Sandy Koufax, and Randy Johnson.

In November 1889, Baldwin met in Chicago with the National Brotherhood of Professional Baseball Players, a union of baseball players which would form the Players' League (PL) in 1890, where the union reportedly discussed the formation of a Chicago team. According to John Montgomery Ward, "the movement is an experiment on our part to have the men who do the work participate in the profits of the pastime". On why he joined the league, Baldwin said he was "not playing ball for principles", but rather for the "money that's in it", and on other players in the PL stated "not one of them ever had much faith in the principles which were said to have led to the revolt".

Despite an attempt by Anson to convince Baldwin to sign with an NL team in which Anson "spent more money than he [had] spent before", on November 21, Baldwin signed a PL contract for the Chicago team, nicknamed the Pirates. Baldwin's 1.77 "average earned runs per game by opponents" through May 21, 1890, ranked second-lowest in the PL, while his seven games played as a pitcher tied for second highest in the league.

Baldwin finished the year as the PL leader in games played as a pitcher (58), innings pitched (492), wins (33), strikeouts (206), complete games (53), and walks (249), as the Pirates finished fourth in the PL, ten games behind the first-place Boston Reds. PL historian Ed Koszarek has described him as a star of the league. When the PL disbanded on January 16, 1891, as the NL and AA ratified a new National Agreement, Columbus retained Baldwin under reserve, and Baldwin officially signed with the team in January 1891 for $2,900 (equivalent to $101,000 in 2024). After a discussion with Alleghenys team owner J. Palmer O'Neil in February, he jumped contract (thereby jumping leagues) and signed with Pittsburgh late that month or early in March despite saying he did not want to play for the club earlier in the year.

=== Pittsburgh Pirates and New York Giants (1891–93) ===
In early March, Baldwin tried to convince Jack O'Connor of the Solons and Silver King of St. Louis to sign with Pittsburgh. Chris von der Ahe, owner of the St. Louis Brown Stockings, had Baldwin arrested for allegedly conspiring with O'Neil to sign players from St. Louis to Pittsburgh shortly thereafter. The charges were nolle prossed, and Baldwin later sued von der Ahe for false imprisonment. After years of litigation, Baldwin won a judgement of $2,525 (equivalent to $95,000 in 2024) against the owner in 1897. Around early 1891, the Alleghenys nickname changed to the Pirates due to the club's habit of signing players from other teams.

In August he allowed only one hit against the Boston Beaneaters in a complete game. He ended an eleven-game winning streak of games in which he pitched in September. Baldwin had a 2.76 earned run average (ERA) and a 1.40 walks plus hits per inning pitched (WHIP) rate in his first year with the club as the Pirates finished last in the NL; (Note: His WHIP was highest on the team among qualified pitchers, while his ERA was the lowest.) Baldwin's 23 hit batsmen led the league, while his totals in innings pitched, wins, losses, and complete games led the club. He re-signed with the Pirates in November.

Baldwin pitched on Opening Day for Pittsburgh on April 12, 1892, in a 7–5 Pittsburgh victory against the Cincinnati Reds. In July, Baldwin asked Brooklyn Bridegrooms president Charles Byrne to trade him to the team in exchange for pitcher Tom Lovett. The proposition never went through, possibly because Brooklyn opposed it. Baldwin either asked for a ten-day vacation or the Pirates suspended him for ten games starting around August 6 due to indifferent play. Pittsburgh gave Baldwin a ten-day notice of intent to release on August 25, 1892 with a local paper stating the Pittsburgh magnates thought of him as "unreliable, of uncertain temper and [believing] his heart was never in the game". The Pirates possibly gave him a ten-day notice due to his involvement in the Homestead strike, a labor strike culminating in a battle between workers of the Carnegie Steel Company and members of the Pinkerton detective agency hired by management to introduce strikebreaker workers to the mill.

In September 1892, Carnegie Steel Company Secretary F. T. F. Lovejoy provided information which left Baldwin charged with aggravated riot. Baldwin stated he was at the strike "merely as a spectator", and when the surrender of the Pinkertons occurred (Note: The Pinkertons surrendered at around 5:00 PM on July 5 after both they and the strikers fired shots. Three Pinkertons and seven workers were killed.) he "went to his home in Homestead and in no way aided or abetted the attack on the defenseless prisoners". Baldwin was released from prison after his father posted $2,000 (equivalent to $70,000 in 2024) bail. He later rejoined the club on the team's trip east, with the club recalling his release. Baldwin was re-arrested on September 23 along with 166 other defendants on the same charge, but never received a trial. He finished the 1892 season with a 26–27 win–loss record and a 3.47 ERA as the team ended with an 80–73–2 win–loss–tie record, sixth in the NL. He led the team in wins and losses, games pitched, innings pitched, complete games, walks, strikeouts, and tied with Red Ehret and Phil Knell for the league lead in hit batsmen.

In the off-season, Baldwin sold real estate and insurance in Homestead, and stated he did not care about returning to baseball after refusing a contract with the Pirates due to low wages. He re-signed with Pittsburgh in February 1893 for $2,400 (equivalent to $84,000 in 2024), the same amount for which he reportedly refused a contract with Pittsburgh earlier. In a game against a team from New Orleans during the off-season, Baldwin walked eleven batters. He appeared in one game for the 1893 Pirates before the club released him in early May. He signed with the New York Giants shortly thereafter in a move that also saw the release of King. In July, Baldwin ended a streak of eleven games pitched in which he did not record a win. He ended the year with a 16–20 record and a 4.10 ERA as the club finished at a 68–64–4 record (fifth in the NL). Baldwin's 33 complete games were second on the Giants to Amos Rusie's 50. In 346 career MLB games, he pitched to a 154–165 win–loss record with 295 complete games.

=== Independent ball (1894–95) ===
In March 1894, New York released Baldwin. An article in The Cincinnati Enquirer stated Baldwin could not find a team with which to sign due to his lawsuit against von der Ahe. A retrospective article in The Washington Post stated Baldwin and King were "marooned" due to their involvement in the Association–League war of 1891, in which clubs from opposing leagues attempted to sign each other's players. Baldwin originally did not want to play in a minor league, though he signed with the Allentown Kelly's Killers in mid May. In a game against Harrisburg in late June, Baldwin allowed at least 23 hits.

He spent the 1894 season with the Binghamton Bingoes (also known as the Allentown Buffaloes) of the Eastern League (EL), the Allentown Kelly's Killers (also known as Easton and Ashland), and the Pottsville Colts, the last two of which competed in the Pennsylvania State League (PSL). The Colts ended the season with a 62–44 record, which ranked first in the PSL, and won the league's championship in a disputed game. An article in the Pottsville Miners Journal stated "his excellent work for Pottsville in the championship games had much to do with bringing our club to first place". He additionally played four games for the Yonkers club of the EL.

Baldwin signed with the Philadelphia Phillies in October. Though an article in The Philadelphia Inquirer stated Baldwin was "certain to stay" with the team on March 31, 1895, the Phillies released him in April due to his drinking. The Phillies recalled his release in early May, but he did not appear in a regular-season game for the team. Shortly after his first release, Baldwin re-signed with the Colts for $200 (equivalent to $7,600 in 2024) per month. The Colts granted his release in June, (Note: According to the Colts, Baldwin refused to sign a contract with Pottsville and the club remained within a thirty-day limit to sign Baldwin. The Colts then sent the facts of what transpired to Presidents Hanlon and Nick Young for possible punishment of Baldwin.) and he signed with the Rochester Browns of the EL for more pay; for Pottsville, he won over two-thirds of the games in which he pitched according to The Allentown Leader.

The Browns released Baldwin due to poor performance which stemmed from drinking alcohol, after which he played for a team in Palmyra and a team in Wheeling of the Iron and Oil League. Baldwin pitched to a record of 10–12 between the Browns and the Colts. During his career, he batted and threw right-handed, weighed 190 pounds (86 kg), and stood 6 feet (180 cm) tall.

== After professional baseball and personal life ==
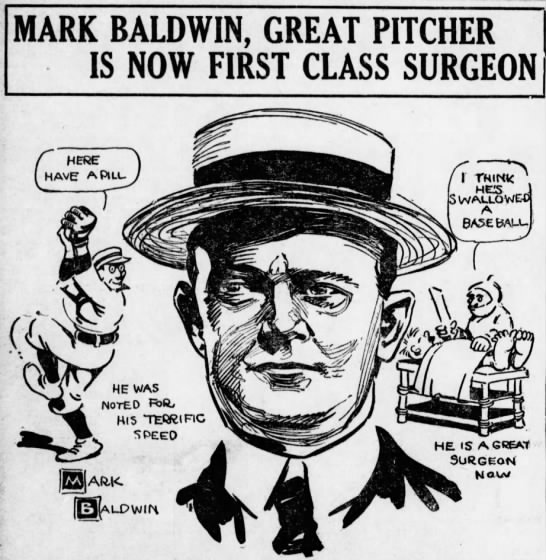
Cartoon showing Baldwin as a surgeon, 1913

During at least two off-seasons, he joined his brother hunting. Baldwin was a close personal friend of Ad Gumbert.

In April 1896, Baldwin's father purchased a semi-professional baseball team which Mark helped organize. It folded before the end of its first season. After professional baseball, Baldwin coached the baseball team of the University of Pennsylvania. He started medical school at the university in fall 1898. He played as a guard on the American football team for either the University of Pennsylvania or Baltimore Medical College, to which he had transferred, or both. He graduated with a Doctor of Medicine degree from Baltimore Medical College in 1900 and practiced in Rochester, Minnesota, in Columbus, and at Passavant Hospital in Pittsburgh.

According to an obituary published in The Pittsburgh Press, Baldwin "spent some time with" physicians William James Mayo and Charles Horace Mayo in Rochester and served as assistant coroner to George Frederick Shrady Jr. in New York City. He identified as a Republican in 1889, and, in 1910, supported former teammate John K. Tener in the latter's bid for Governor of Pennsylvania. Baldwin was a Freemason. He never married.

He died at Passavant Hospital on November 10, 1929, of cardiorenal disease after a long illness. He was interred at Allegheny Cemetery in Pittsburgh.

== See also ==
- List of Major League Baseball career hit batsmen leaders
- List of Major League Baseball annual strikeout leaders
