= Frank Dwyer =

American baseball player (1868–1943)

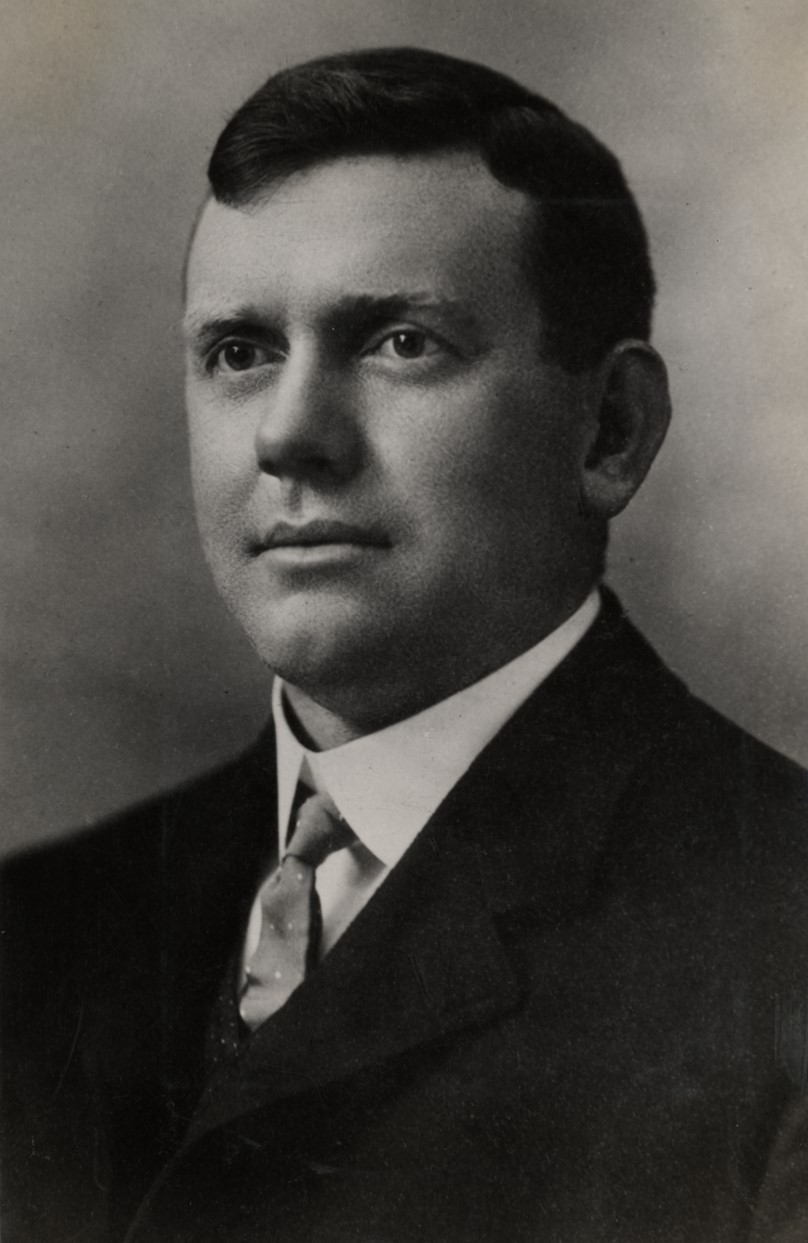
- Dwyer in 1902
- Pitcher / Manager
- Born: March 25, 1868; Lee, Massachusetts, U.S.
- Died: February 4, 1943 (aged 74); Pittsfield, Massachusetts, U.S.
- Batted: Right Threw: Right

MLB debut
- September 20, 1888, for the Chicago White Stockings

Last MLB appearance
- July 24, 1899, for the Cincinnati Reds

MLB statistics
- Win–loss record: 177–151
- Earned run average: 3.84
- Strikeouts: 565
- Managerial record: 52–83
- Winning %: .385
- Stats at Baseball Reference

Teams
- As player: Chicago White Stockings (1888–1889); Chicago Pirates (1890); Cincinnati Kelly's Killers (1891); Milwaukee Brewers (1891); St. Louis Browns (1892); Cincinnati Reds (1892–1899); As manager: Detroit Tigers (1902)

John Francis Dwyer (March 25, 1868 – February 4, 1943) was an American right-handed pitcher in Major League Baseball for the Chicago White Stockings (1888–1889), Chicago Pirates (1890), Cincinnati Kelly's Killers (1891), Milwaukee Brewers (1891), St. Louis Browns (1892), and Cincinnati Reds (1892–1899). He was the manager for the Detroit Tigers in 1902.

== Baseball career ==
Dwyer was born in Lee, Massachusetts, in 1868. He started his professional baseball career in 1888 with the Western Association's Chicago Maroons. He won 19 games for the Maroons and then made his major league debut with the National League's Chicago White Stockings in September.

Over the next four years, Dwyer played for several different teams. He became a member of the Cincinnati Reds in June 1892 after making light of St. Louis Browns owner Chris von der Ahe in the newspaper. Von der Ahe released him and fined him $100, though Dwyer said he could have been sold to another ball club for $1,500.

Dwyer played for the Reds from 1892 to the end of his playing career in 1899. On June 23, 1896, he gave up Roger Connor's 123rd career home run, which broke Harry Stovey's previous record of 122. Connor's record of 138 was eventually broken by Babe Ruth.

Dwyer's 1896 season was the best of his career, as he had a 24–11 win–loss record and a 3.15 earned run average. The 24 wins were his career-high.

In 12 major league seasons, Dwyer had a 177–151 record. He had 366 games pitched, 318 games started, 2,819 innings pitched, 271 complete games, 12 shutouts, 6 saves, 565 strikeouts, 764 walks, and a 3.84 ERA.

Dwyer was the second manager of the Detroit Tigers, managing for one season in 1902. He led the team to a 52–83 record. Dwyer briefly umpired in the National League in 1899 and 1901, and in the American League in 1904, during which he umpired Cy Young's perfect game.

== Later life ==
In 1915, Dwyer, then living in Geneva, New York, was appointed to the New York State Athletic Commission by Governor Charles Seymour Whitman. His term expired in 1924 and Governor Al Smith chose to appoint James Farley instead. That same year, Dwyer became the pitching coach of the New York Giants.

On February 4, 1943, Dwyer died while visiting relatives in Pittsfield, Massachusetts. He was 74 years old.

== See also ==
- List of Major League Baseball annual saves leaders
- List of Major League Baseball career complete games leaders
- List of Major League Baseball career hit batsmen leaders
