= Tip O'Neill (baseball) =

Canadian baseball player (1860–1915)

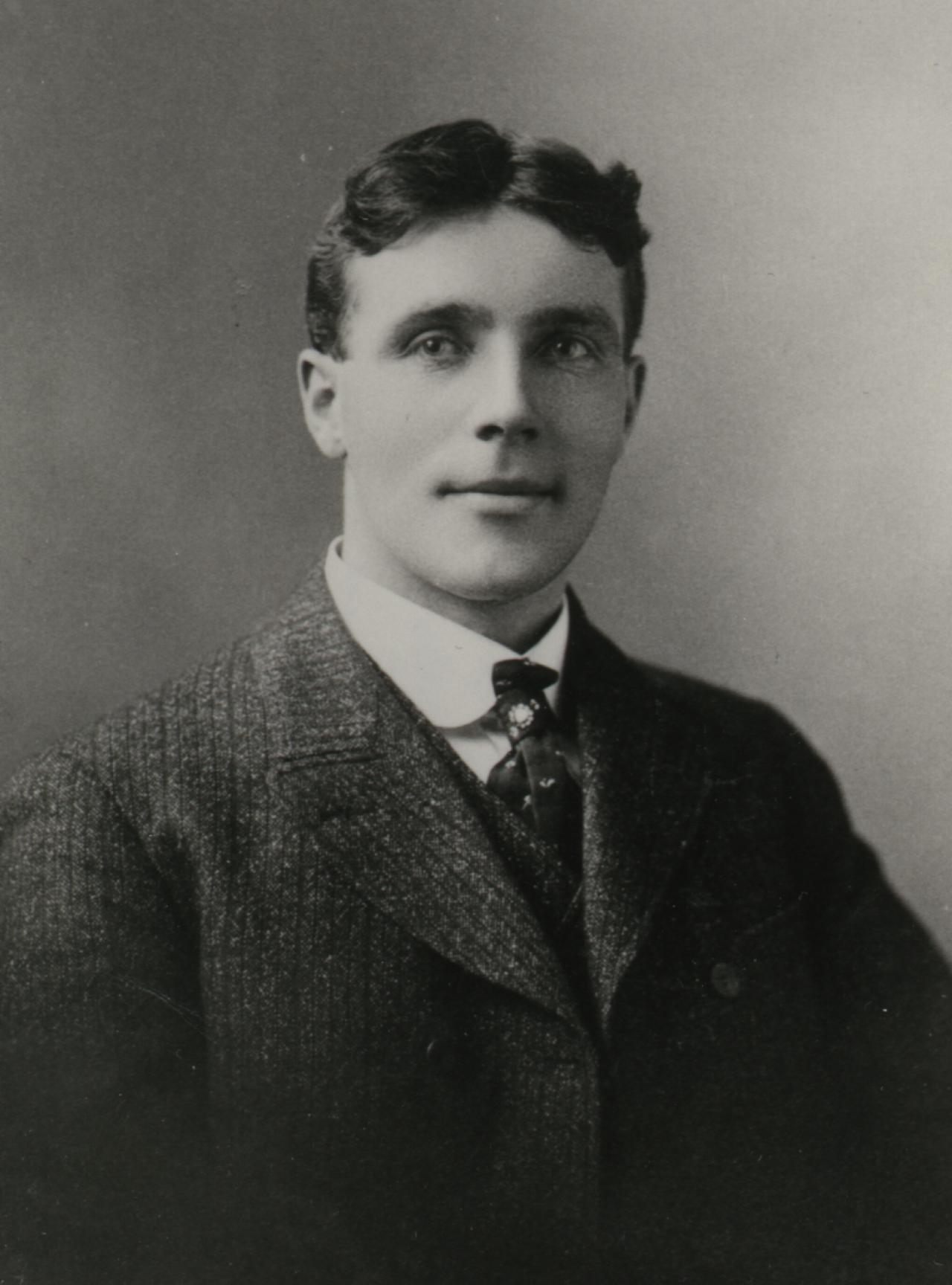
- Left fielder
- Born: May 15, 1860; Springfield, Canada West
- Died: December 31, 1915 (aged 55); Montreal, Quebec, Canada
- Batted: Right Threw: Right

MLB debut
- May 5, 1883, for the New York Gothams

Last MLB appearance
- August 30, 1892, for the Cincinnati Reds

MLB statistics
- Batting average: .326
- Home runs: 52
- Runs batted in: 757
- Stats at Baseball Reference

Teams
- New York Gothams (1883); St. Louis Browns (1884–1889); Chicago Pirates (1890); St. Louis Browns (1891); Cincinnati Reds (1892)

Career highlights and awards
- AA Triple Crown (1887); AA batting champion (1888); AA RBI leader (1886)

Member of the Canadian

Baseball Hall of Fame
- Induction: 1983

James Edward "Tip" O'Neill (May 15, 1860 – December 31, 1915) was a Canadian professional baseball player from approximately 1875 to 1892. He began playing organized baseball in Woodstock, Ontario, and later played ten seasons across four teams in Major League Baseball, principally as a left fielder, but also as a pitcher.

While playing with the St. Louis Browns from 1884 to 1889, O'Neill helped the club compile a 516–247 record while also winning four pennants and the 1886 World Series. O'Neill won two American Association batting championships during those years and became the second person in major league history to hit for a triple crown, leading the league in 1887 with a .435 batting average, 14 home runs and 123 runs batted in (RBIs). He also rewrote the major league record book, establishing new records in at least eight categories, including the highest batting average (originally .492, adjusted to .435), on-base percentage (.490) and slugging percentage (.691), and the most hits (225), runs scored (167), doubles (52), extra base hits (84), and total bases (357) in a single season. His adjusted .435 batting average in 1887 remains the second highest in major league history.

O'Neill, dubbed "Canada's Babe Ruth", was posthumously inducted into both the Canadian Baseball Hall of Fame and the Ontario Sports Hall of Fame. Each year since 1984, the Canadian Baseball Hall of Fame has presented the Tip O'Neill Award to the best Canadian baseball player.

== Early life ==
O'Neill was born in 1860 at Springfield, Canada West, a village in modern-day Southwestern Ontario that was later incorporated into the township of Malahide. While O'Neill was a boy, his family moved approximately 30 miles northeast to Woodstock, where his parents operated a hotel.

== Professional baseball player ==
=== Minor leagues ===
In 1875, O'Neill began playing organized baseball in Woodstock, and became known as "The Woodstock Wonder." He also traveled with barnstorming teams. In 1881, he reportedly played in Detroit, and in 1882, he played for the New York Metropolitans in the League Alliance.

=== New York Gothams ===
O'Neill made his major league debut on May 5, 1883, as a pitcher for the New York Gothams of the National League. Shortly after his major league debut, Sporting Life wrote: "O'Neill, the New York change pitcher, seems to have but one element of effectiveness in his delivery, viz.: fast and slow. This is a very weak reliance nowadays, as batsmen have only to note the speed of the ball and wait for a good one. O'Neill's delivery is wild and erratic -- hard work for the catcher and busy work for the field." O'Neill appeared in 19 games as a starting pitcher for the Gothams and compiled a win–loss record of 5–12 and a 4.07 earned run average (ERA).

=== St. Louis Browns ===
==== 1884 season ====
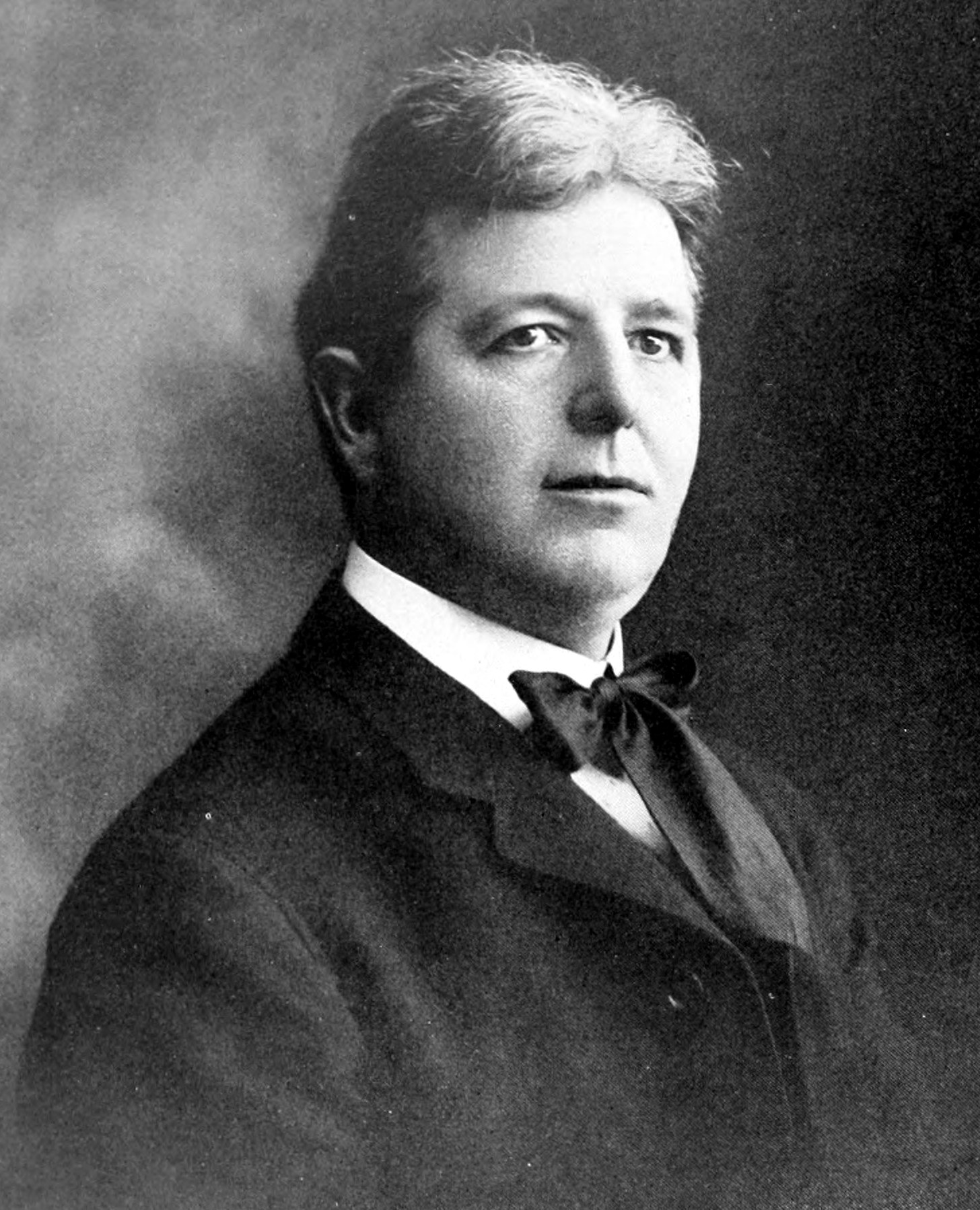
O'Neill played for teams managed by Charlie Comiskey (pictured) every year from 1884–1892.

In 1884, O'Neill joined Charlie Comiskey's St. Louis Browns of the American Association. He was signed by Comiskey to replace pitcher Tony Mullane, who left the Browns after the 1883 season. O'Neill compiled an 11–4 win–loss record with a 2.68 ERA and led the league with a .733 winning percentage as pitcher. However, his arm reportedly "went back on him" during the 1884 season, requiring him to switch from pitching to playing in the outfield. He ended up playing 64 games as an outfielder in 1884 and was exclusively an outfielder thereafter.

==== 1885 season ====
In 1885, O'Neill missed much of the season, suffering an injury on June 10 and not returning to the lineup until September 3. Despite the injury, O'Neill established himself as the Browns' best batter, hitting .350 in 52 games, nearly 80 points higher than any other player on the team. The 1885 Browns won the American Association pennant with a 79-33 record and tied the Chicago White Stockings in the 1885 World Series. O'Neill scored four runs but hit .208 in his first World Series.

==== 1886 season ====
O'Neill played his first full season as a position player in 1886 and became one of the most valuable players in baseball. He appeared in 138 games, all as an outfielder, and led the league with 107 runs batted in (RBIs). He was also among the league leaders with a .328 batting average (5th), .385 on-base percentage (5th), .440 slugging percentage (6th), 190 hits (2nd), 255 total bases (2nd), 45 extra base hits (5th), and a 4.9 Wins Above Replacement (WAR) rating (2nd among position players).

O'Neill's hitting helped lead the Browns to the American Association pennant with a 93-46 record. The team also went on to defeat the Chicago White Stockings of the National League in the 1886 World Series. O'Neill hit .400 with a .500 on-base percentage, five runs scored, five RBIs, two home runs and two stolen bases in the World Series.

==== 1887 season ====
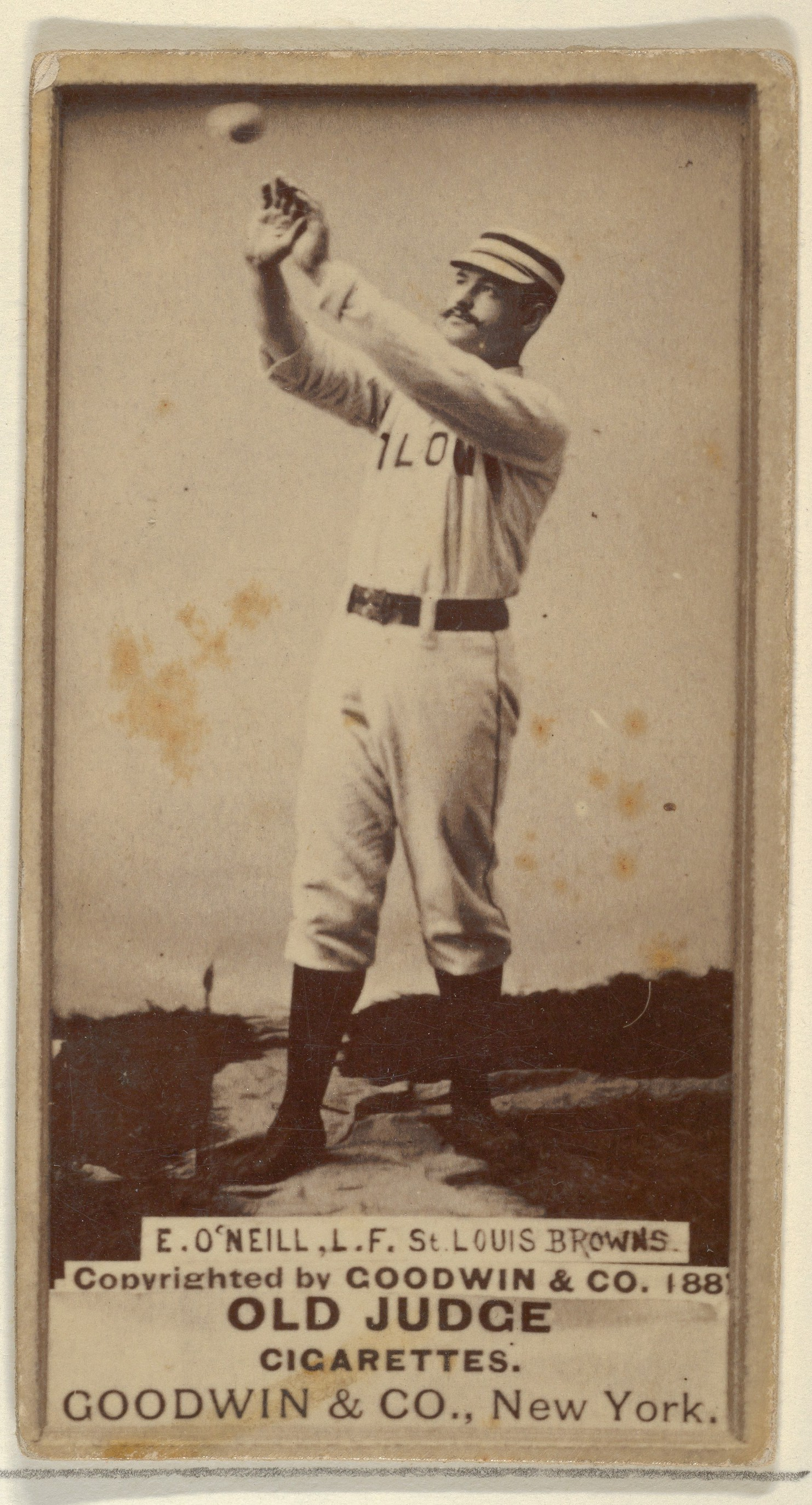
James Edward "Tip" O'Neill, Left Field, St. Louis Browns, 1887-90

In 1887, O'Neill rewrote the major league batting record book in just 124 games. That year, he won the American Association triple crown with a .435 batting average, 14 home runs and 123 RBIs. His batting average was originally recorded at .492, bases on balls having been counted as hits during that season. At the time of his death in 1915, his unadjusted .492 average was recorded as the highest in major league history. Subsequently, batting averages for the 1887 season were adjusted by removing bases on balls from the calculations. Even after that adjustment, O'Neill's 1887 batting average of .435 was a major league record until 1894 when Hugh Duffy established the current major league record by hitting .440. O'Neill's adjusted average for 1887 remains the second highest single season batting average in major league history.

O'Neill's batting performance in 1887 also established new single season, major league records in at least seven other categories, including the highest on-base percentage (.490), slugging percentage (.691), most hits (225), runs scored (167), doubles (52), and extra base hits (84), and total bases (357). He also led all position players across Major League Baseball in 1887 with a 6.9 WAR rating.

O'Neill's hitting in 1887 helped lead the Browns to their third consecutive American Association pennant with a 95-40 record. The Browns lost the 1887 World Series to the Detroit Wolverines, as O'Neill hit .200 in 65 at bats against Detroit's pitching in the World Series.

==== 1888 season ====
In 1888, O'Neill won his second consecutive American Association batting title by hitting .335. He also ranked among the league leaders in multiple hitting categories for the third consecutive year with a .390 on-base percentage (2nd), .446 slugging percentage (3rd), 177 hits (1st), 236 total bases (3rd), 98 RBIs (4th), and 225 times on base (3rd).

With O'Neill again leading the club in hitting, the Browns won their fourth consecutive pennant in 1888 with a 92-43 record. The Browns lost the 1888 World Series to the New York Giants, though O'Neill compiled a .349 on-base percentage with eight runs, 11 RBIs and two home runs in his final World Series.

==== 1889 season ====
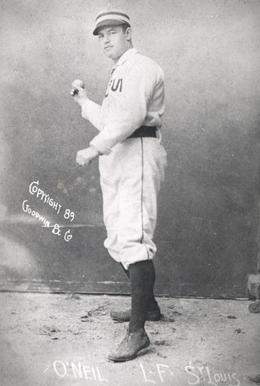
Baseball card of O'Neill, c. 1889

O'Neill had his fifth consecutive strong season as a batter in 1889. He appeared in 134 games in the outfield and compiled a .335 batting average, the second highest in the American Association. He again ranked among the league leaders in multiple batting categories with a .419 on-base percentage (4th), .478 slugging percentage (4th), 179 hits (4th), 255 total bases (3rd), 33 doubles (4th), nine home runs (5th), 110 RBIs (3rd), and 50 extra base hits (3rd). The Browns compiled a 90-45 record in 1889 but finished in second place, two games behind the Brooklyn Bridegrooms.

In O'Neill's first six seasons with the Browns from 1884 to 1889, he appeared in 656 games, scored 585 runs, compiled a WAR rating of 22.5, and hit .347 with a .407 on-base percentage, .498 slugging percentage, 925 hits, and 538 RBIs. During those six seasons, he was the Browns' dominant hitter and helped the club win four pennants and compile a record of 516 wins and 247 losses.

=== Chicago Pirates ===
O'Neill followed Charlie Comiskey to the Players' League in 1890, appearing in 137 games as an outfielder for Comiskey's Chicago Pirates. He hit .302 in the Players' League with a .377 on-base percentage. He led the league in games played and ranked second with 647 plate appearances and seventh with 174 hits and 244 times on base.

=== Return to St. Louis ===
O'Neill followed Comiskey back to the Browns in 1891. He appeared in 127 games in the outfield and was among the league leaders with a .323 batting average (3rd), .404 on-base percentage (6th), .451 slugging percentage (8th), 166 hits (6th), 232 total bases (6th), 28 doubles (3rd), 10 home runs (4th), 95 RBIs (6th) and 42 extra base hits (8th).

=== Cincinnati Reds ===
In 1892, Charlie Comiskey jumped to the Cincinnati Reds of the National League, and O'Neill again followed Comiskey. In nine of ten years of O'Neill's career, he played on teams managed by Comiskey. O'Neill appeared in 109 games as an outfielder for the Reds in 1892. At the start of spring training, Ban Johnson, then the Cincinnati correspondent to The Sporting News, expressed hope that O'Neill would help the Reds to a pennant: "Tip O'Neill is big, hearty and strong, and gives promise of doing great things for the club in the near-approaching campaign for pennant honors." However, his batting average in 1892 dropped 72 points from the prior season to .251, his lowest season since his rookie year as a pitcher in 1883. O'Neill began the season slow, but in mid-May, Comiskey expressed confidence that O'Neill would "come back to his old form after a while." The following month, the New York Sun reported that O'Neill was one of the most frequent recipients of Comiskey's mid-game "lecture, without any curtain." By mid-July, The Sporting Life reported: "Tip O'Neill has lately been playing so poorly that the Cincinnati cranks have soured on him." He appeared in his last major league game on August 30, 1892, at age 34.

In December 1892, Comiskey told The Sporting News that O'Neill had left the club without permission and had not been heard from since. However, Comiskey added: "If he can play ball for me as well as he did at St. Louis I should like to have him. Last year Tip was in poor health, and that is the reason I assigned for his weak stick work."

=== Career statistics ===
Over 10 major league seasons, O'Neill appeared in 1,052 games (1,022 as an outfielder) and made 4,712 plate appearances and compiled a .326 batting average, .392 on-base percentage, and .458 slugging percentage. He totaled 879 runs scored, 1,385 hits, 222 doubles, 92 triples, 52 home runs, 757 RBIs, 161 stolen bases, 420 bases on balls, and 1,947 total bases.

O'Neill is one of only 15 players in baseball history to have won a major league baseball Triple Crown. Of the 14 triple crown winners who are eligible for the Baseball Hall of Fame (Miguel Cabrera is not yet eligible), O'Neill and Paul Hines are the only two who have not been inducted. At the end of the 2013 season, O'Neill's .326 career batting average was the 36th highest in major league history. Of the 35 players with higher career batting averages than O'Neill, only five eligible players (Dave Orr [.342], Pete Browning [.341], Jake Stenzel [.337], Riggs Stephenson [.336] and Mike Donlin [.332]) have not been inducted into the Baseball Hall of Fame.

== Later years, death and honours ==
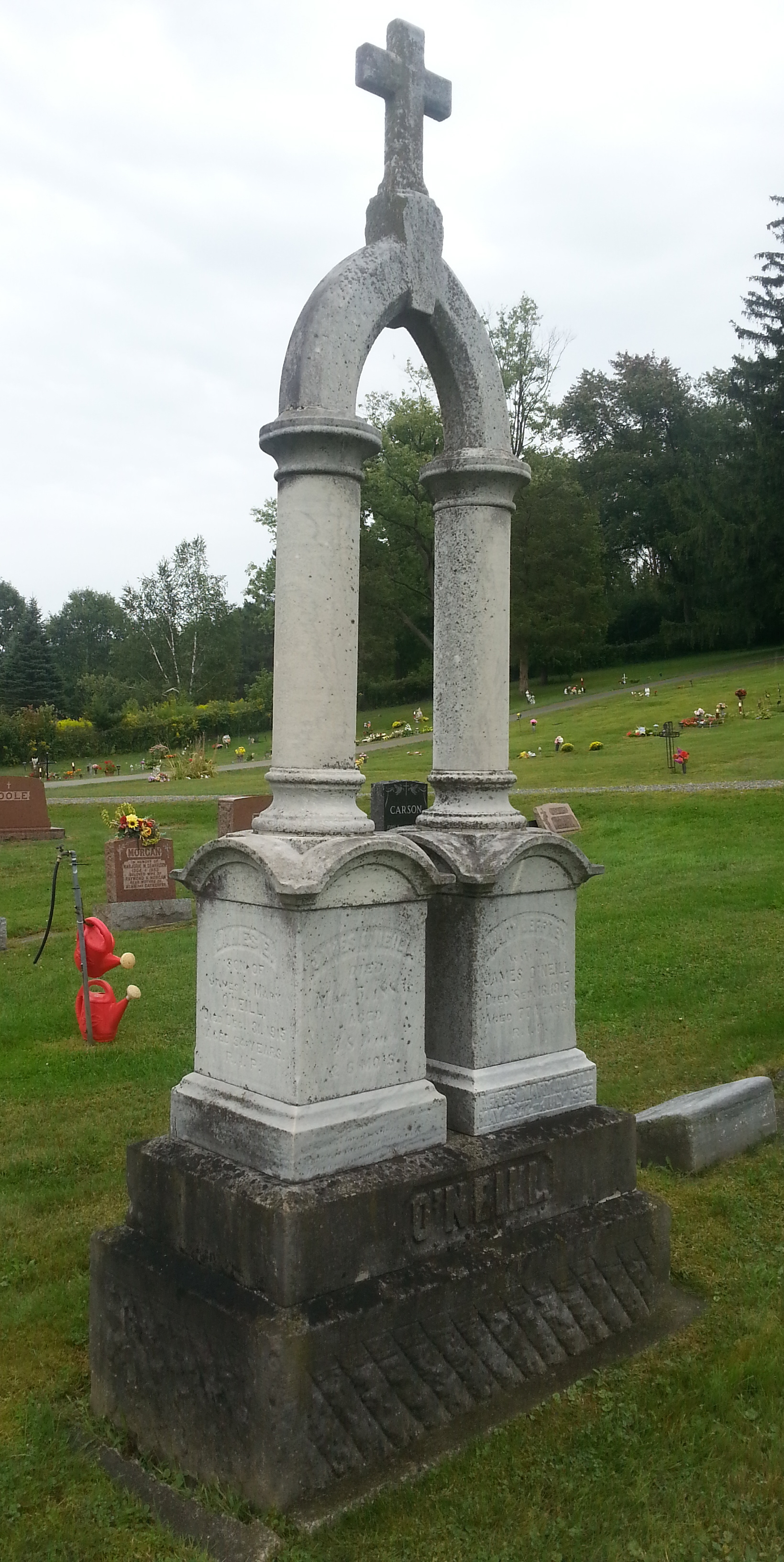
O'Neill family gravestone

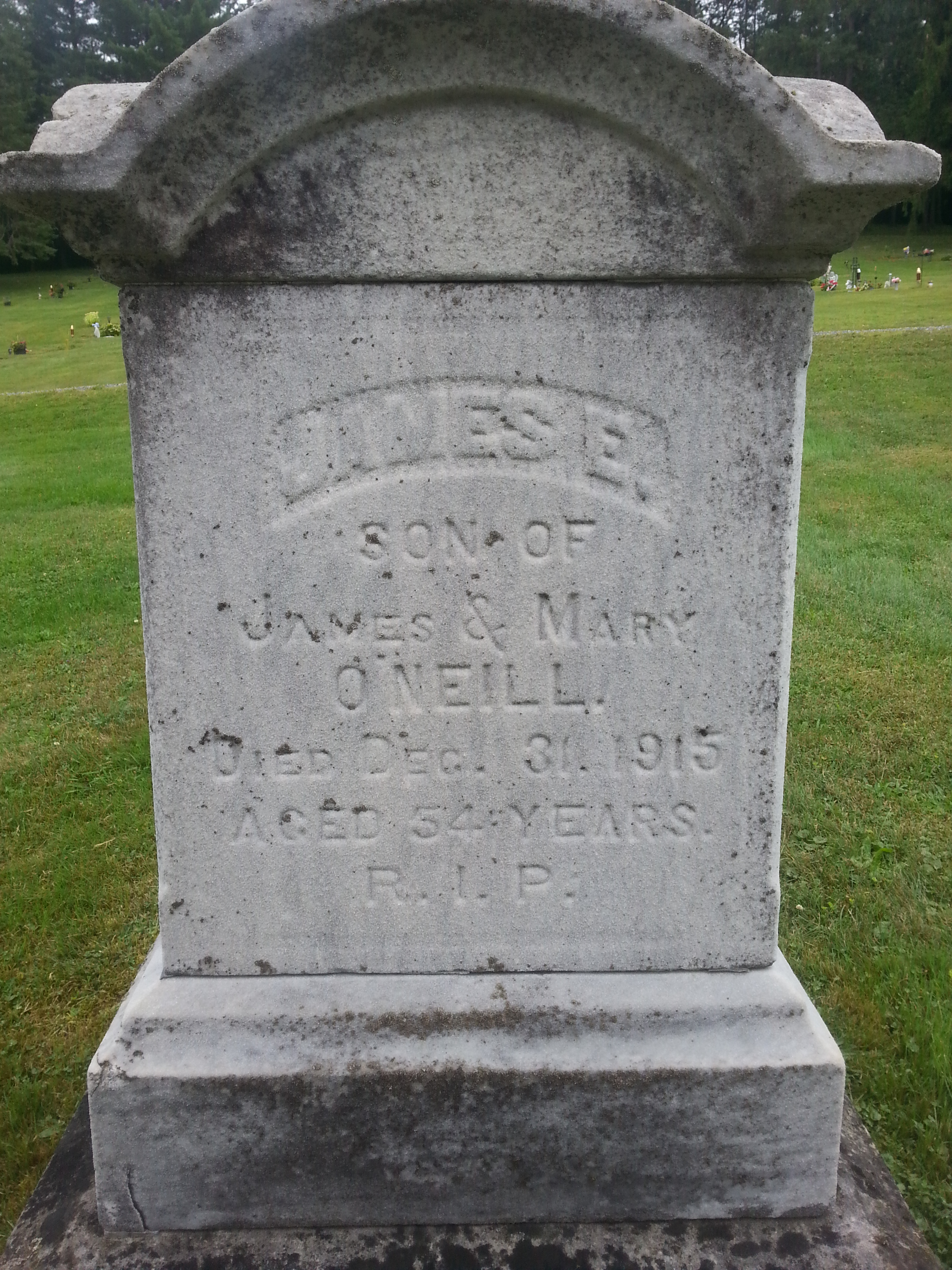
Close-up of Tip O'Neill's engraving

Shortly after O'Neill retired from baseball, The Sporting Life reported in July 1893 that he was "making book" at Sheepshead Bay, a horse racing track in New York City. He also worked as a "big league umpire" and as a scout for various baseball clubs, including the Chicago White Sox. He moved to Montreal, Quebec where he lived with his brother and assisted in acquiring a minor league baseball club for the city.

On December 31, 1915, O'Neill died suddenly at age 55 in Montreal while riding a streetcar. The cause of death was determined to be a heart attack. His body was returned to Woodstock and he was buried in St. Mary Cemetery.

In 1983, O'Neill was posthumously honoured as one of the first inductees into the Canadian Baseball Hall of Fame which, each year, presents the Tip O'Neill Award in his honour to "the player judged to have excelled in individual achievement and team contribution while adhering to baseball's highest ideals." A municipal baseball field in Woodstock is named Tip O'Neill Field in his honour. He was inducted into the Ontario Sports Hall of Fame in 1997.

== Other "Tip" O'Neills ==
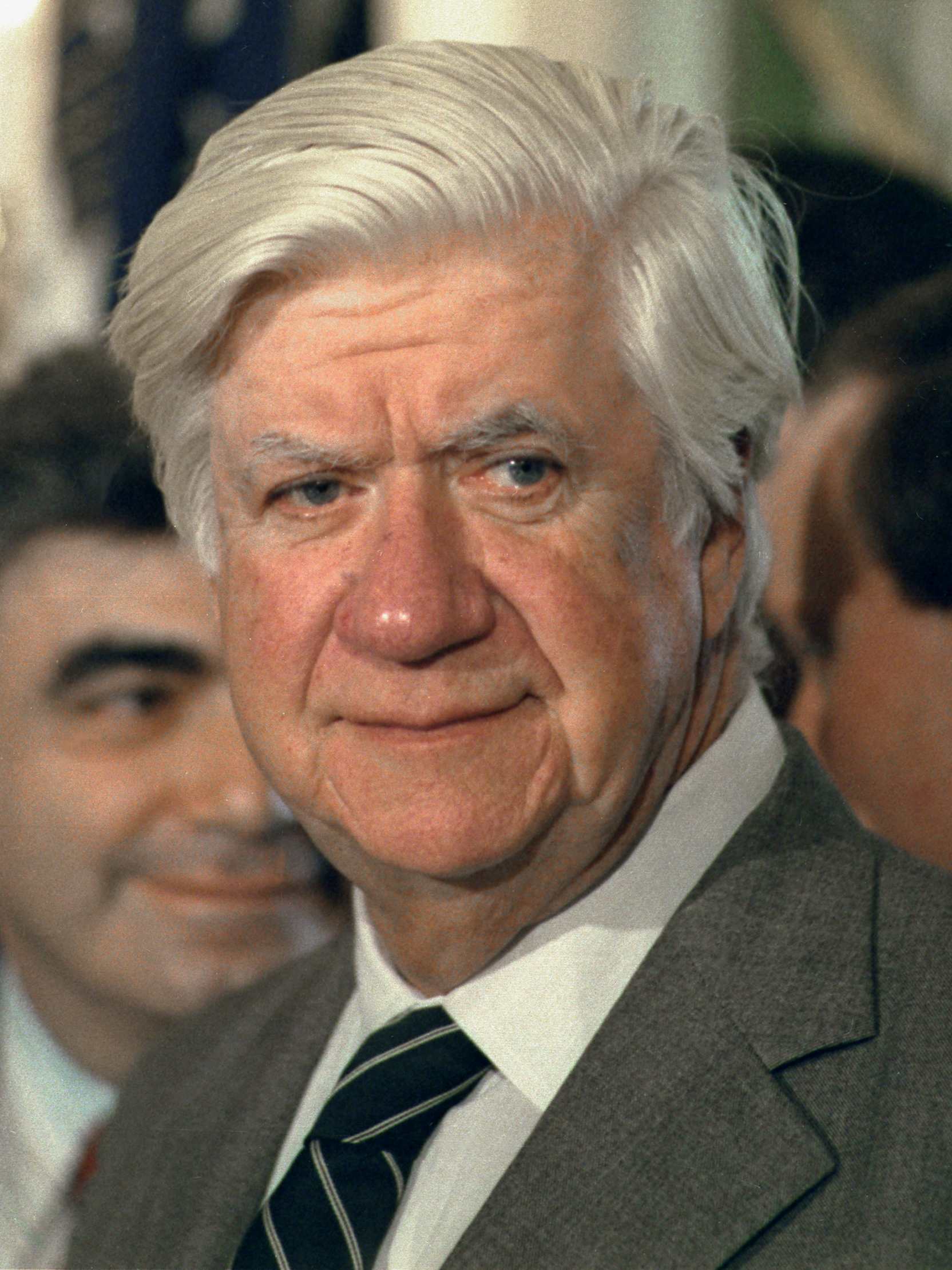
U.S. Speaker of the House "Tip" O'Neill was nicknamed after O'Neill.

During the late 19th century and early 20th century, there were several other athletes who went by the name "Tip" O'Neill. In 1898, O'Neill wrote to The Sporting Life to correct a report that he was managing a baseball team in Montgomery, Alabama. He noted: "It seems strange that every ball player whose name happens to be O'Neill should call himself Tip. One Tip died in London, Can., a few years ago, and when I would meet friends that I had not met for some time they would take me for a ghost. The Chicago "Record" last spring had me dying of consumption."

The confusion of "Tip" O'Neills continues as some sources erroneously state that O'Neill served as the president of the Western League, a minor league based in the Midwestern United States. To the contrary, the individual who served as president of the Western League was Norris "Tip" O'Neill.

Years later, the future American politician and Speaker of the House, Thomas "Tip" O'Neill (1912–1994), was given the nickname "Tip" as a boy, due to his shared surname with the 19th century baseball player.

== See also ==
- List of Major League Baseball batting champions
- List of Major League Baseball annual home run leaders
- List of Major League Baseball annual runs batted in leaders
- List of Major League Baseball annual runs scored leaders
- List of Major League Baseball annual doubles leaders
- List of Major League Baseball annual triples leaders
- List of Major League Baseball players to hit for the cycle
- List of St. Louis Cardinals team records

Achievements
Preceded by Ned Williamson	Single season doubles record holder 1887–1899	Succeeded by Ed Delahanty
Preceded by Bid McPhee	American Association Home Run Champion; 1887	Succeeded by John Reilly
Preceded by Chippy McGarr; Fred Carroll	Hitting for the cycle April 30, 1887; May 7, 1887	Succeeded by Fred Carroll; Dave Orr
