= Base on balls =

In baseball, reaching base on four balls

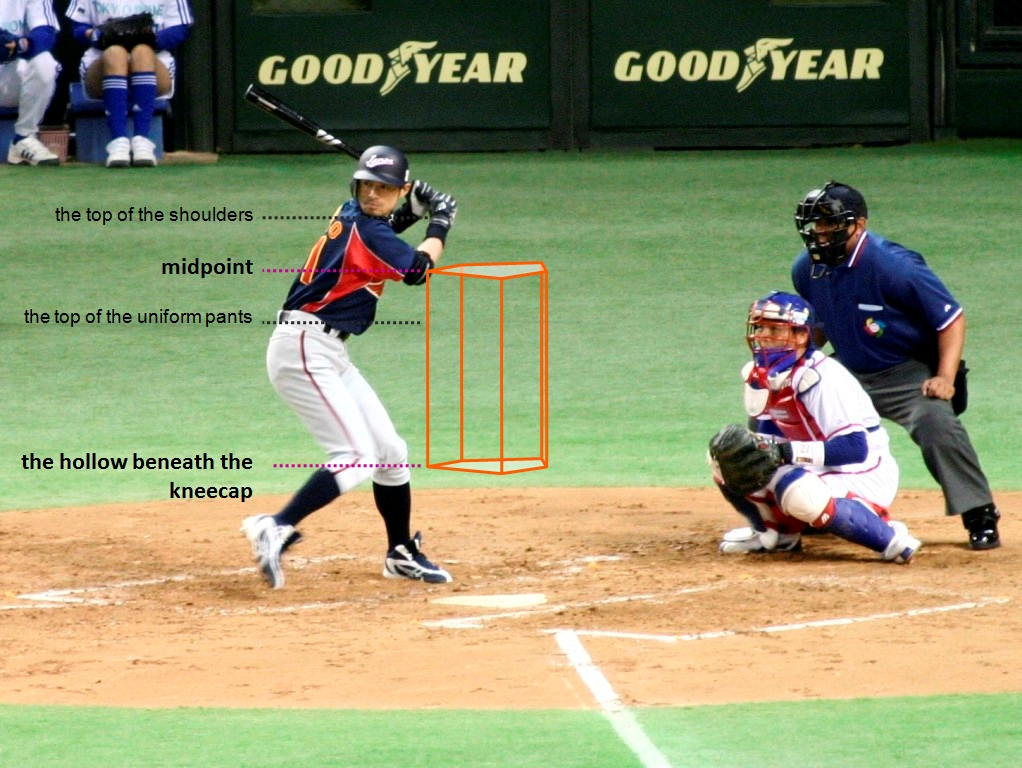
A depiction of the strike zone. A base on balls occurs as a result of a plate appearance during which four pitches are thrown out of the strike zone that the batter does not swing at.

A base on balls (BB), better known as a walk, occurs in baseball when a batter receives four pitches during a plate appearance that the umpire calls balls, and is in turn awarded first base without the possibility of being called out. The base on balls is defined in Section 2.00 of baseball's Official Rules, and further detail is given in 6.08(a). Despite being known as a "walk", it is considered a faux pas for a professional player to actually walk to first base; the batter-runner and any advancing runners normally jog on such a play.

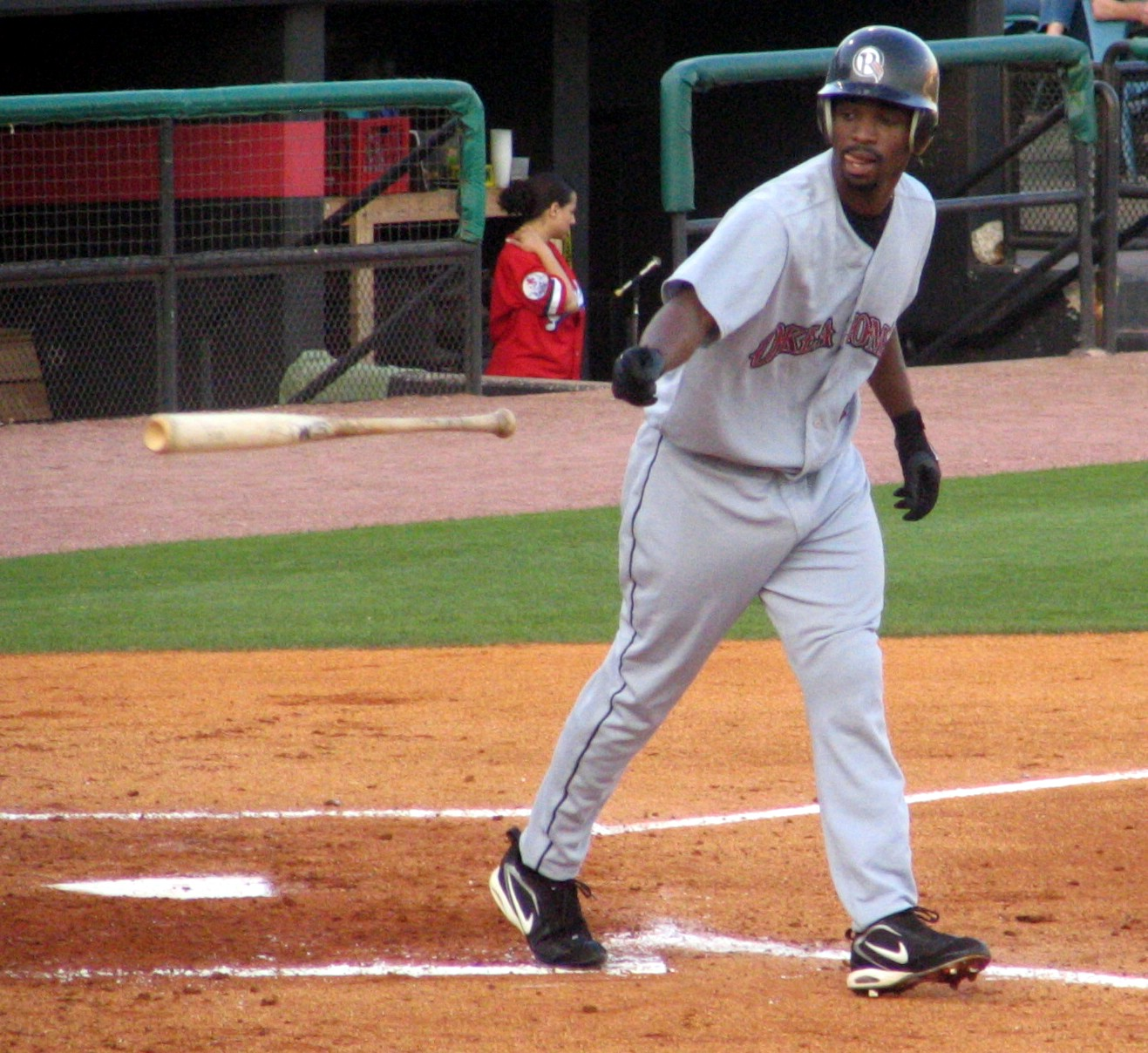
Rashad Eldridge of the Oklahoma Redhawks walks to first base after drawing a base on balls.

The term "base on balls" distinguishes a walk from the other manners in which a batter can be awarded first base without liability to be put out (e.g., hit by pitch (HBP), catcher's interference). Though a base on balls, catcher's interference, or a batter hit by a pitched ball all result in the batter (and possibly runners on base) being awarded a base, the term "walk" usually refers only to a base on balls, and not the other methods of reaching base without the bat touching the ball. An important difference is that for a hit batter or catcher's interference, the ball is dead and no one may advance unless forced; the ball is live after a walk (see below for details).

A batter who draws a base on balls is commonly said to have been "walked" by the pitcher. When the batter is walked, runners advance one base without liability to be put out only if forced to vacate their base to allow the batter to take first base. If a batter draws a walk with the bases loaded, all preceding runners are forced to advance, including the runner on third base who is forced to home plate to score a run; when a run is forced on a walk, the batter is credited with a run batted in per rule 9.04.

Receiving a base on balls does not count as a hit or an at bat for a batter but does count as a time on base and a plate appearance. Therefore, a base on balls does not affect a player's batting average, but it can increase his on-base percentage.

A hit by pitch is not counted statistically as a walk, though the effect is mostly the same, with the batter receiving a free pass to first base. One exception is that on hit-by-pitch, the ball is dead, and any runners attempting to steal on the play must return to their original base unless forced to the next base anyway. When a walk occurs, the ball is still live: any runner not forced to advance may nevertheless attempt to advance at his own risk, which might occur on a steal play, passed ball, or wild pitch. Also, because a ball is live when a base on balls occurs, runners on base forced to advance one base may attempt to advance beyond one base, at their own risk. The batter-runner himself may attempt to advance beyond first base, at his own risk. Rule 6.08 addresses this matter as well. An attempt to advance an additional base beyond the base awarded might occur when ball four is a passed ball or a wild pitch.

== History ==
In early baseball, there was no concept of a "ball". It was created by the NABBP in 1863, originally as a sort of unsportsmanlike-conduct penalty: "Should the pitcher repeatedly fail to deliver to the striker fair balls, for the apparent purpose of delaying the game, or for any other cause, the umpire, after warning him, shall call one ball, and if the pitcher persists in such action, two and three balls; when three balls shall have been called, the striker shall be entitled to the first base; and should any base be occupied at that time, each player occupying them shall be entitled to one base without being put out." Note that this rule in effect gave the pitcher 9 balls, since each penalty ball could only be called on a third offense. In 1869 the rule was modified so that only those baserunners forced to advance could advance. From 1871 through 1886, the batter was entitled to call "high" or "low", i.e. above or below the waist; a pitch which failed to conform was "unfair". Certain pitches were defined as automatic balls in 1872: any ball delivered over the batter's head, that hit the ground in front of home plate, was delivered to the opposite side from the batter, or came within one foot of him. In 1880, the National League changed the rules so that eight "unfair balls" instead of nine were required for a walk. In 1884, the National League changed the rules so that six balls were required for a walk. In 1886, the American Association changed the rules so that six balls instead of seven were required for a walk; however, the National League changed the rules so that seven balls were required for a walk instead of six. In 1887, the National League and American Association agreed to abide by some uniform rule changes, including, for the first time, a strike zone which defined balls and strikes by rule rather than the umpire's discretion, and decreased the number of balls required for a walk to five. In 1889, the National League and the American Association decreased the number of balls required for a walk to four.

In 2017, Major League Baseball approved a rule change allowing for a batter to be walked intentionally by having the defending bench signal to the umpire. The move was met with some controversy.

== Intentional base on balls ==
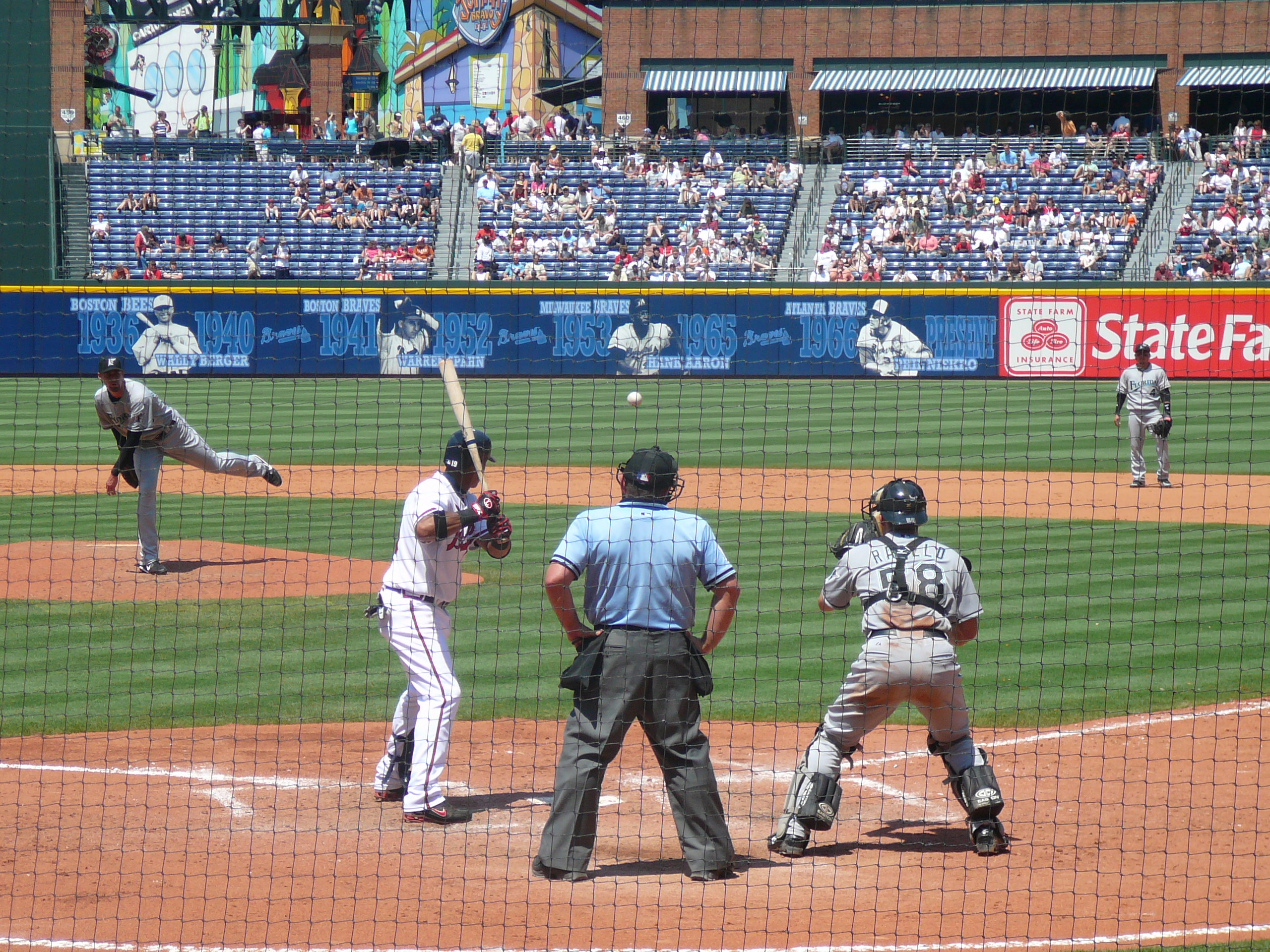
Mark Hendrickson of the Florida Marlins intentionally walking the Atlanta Braves' Yunel Escobar in 2008. Note the Florida catcher, Mike Rabelo, in a standing position behind the opposite batter's box to receive the pitch. This method of issuing an intentional walk is no longer used in Major League Baseball.

A subset of the base on balls, an intentional base on balls (IBB), or intentional walk, is when the defensive team intentionally issues a walk to the batter. In Major League Baseball and many amateur leagues, an intentional base on balls is signaled to the home plate umpire by the defensive team's manager holding up four fingers, at which point the batter is awarded first base without any further pitches being thrown. In some leagues and in Major League Baseball prior to 2017, an intentional base on balls is issued when the pitcher deliberately pitches the ball away from the batter four times (or as many times as needed to get to ball four if the decision to issue the intentional walk is made with one or more balls already on the count). As with any other walk, an intentional walk entitles the batter to first base without liability to be put out, and entitles any runners to advance if forced.

Intentional walks are a strategic defensive maneuver, commonly done to bypass one hitter for one the defensive team believes is less likely to initiate a run-scoring play (e.g., a home run, sacrifice fly, or RBI base hit). Teams also commonly use intentional walks to set up a double play or force out situation for the next batter.

== Major League Baseball leaders ==
=== Single-season ===
*	Member of the National Baseball Hall of Fame

Most by Batters
Rank	Player	Year	Bases on balls
1	Barry Bonds	2004	232
2	Barry Bonds	2002	198
3	Barry Bonds	2001	177
4	Babe Ruth*	1923	170
5	Mark McGwire	1998	162
5	Ted Williams*	1947	162
5	Ted Williams*	1949	162
8	Ted Williams*	1946	156
9	Barry Bonds	1996	151
9	Eddie Yost	1956	151

Most by Pitchers
Rank	Player	Year	Bases on balls
1	Amos Rusie*	1890	289
2	Mark Baldwin	1889	274
3	Amos Rusie*	1892	270
4	Amos Rusie*	1891	262
5	Mark Baldwin	1890	249
6	Jack Stivetts	1891	232
7	Mark Baldwin	1891	227
8	Phil Knell	1891	226
9	Bob Barr	1890	219
10	Amos Rusie*	1893	218

=== Game ===
Jimmie Foxx, Andre Thornton, Jeff Bagwell and Bryce Harper have each been walked six times during a major league regular season game. Among pitchers, Tommy Byrne and Bruno Haas both gave up 16 bases on balls in a game. On September 17, 1920, the Boston Red Sox drew 20 walks in a 12-inning game against the Detroit Tigers. As of September 2024, this is the most walks drawn or allowed by a team in a single game in Major League history according to available data.

== See also related lists ==
- Baseball statistics
- List of Major League Baseball career bases on balls leaders
- List of Major League Baseball career total bases leaders
- List of Major League Baseball career on-base percentage leaders
- List of Major League Baseball career OPS leaders
- 3,000 strikeout club
- List of Major League Baseball career strikeout leaders
