= Dell Darling =

American baseball player (1861–1904)

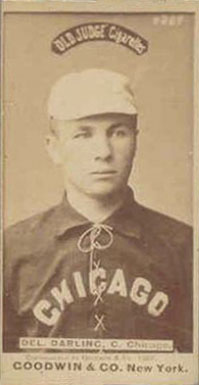
- Catcher
- Born: December 21, 1861; Erie, Pennsylvania, U.S.
- Died: November 20, 1904 (aged 42); Erie, Pennsylvania, U.S.
- Batted: Right Threw: Right

MLB debut
- July 3, 1883, for the Buffalo Bisons

Last MLB appearance
- September 10, 1891, for the St. Louis Browns

MLB statistics
- Batting average: .240
- Home runs: 7
- Runs batted in: 83
- Stats at Baseball Reference

Teams
- Buffalo Bisons (1883); Chicago White Stockings (1887–89); Chicago Pirates (1890); St. Louis Browns (1891)

Conrad "Dell" Darling (1861–1904) was an American Major League Baseball player. He played six seasons in the majors, between 1883 and 1891, for the Buffalo Bisons, Chicago White Stockings, Chicago Pirates and St. Louis Browns.
