= Frank Shugart =

American baseball player (1866–1944)

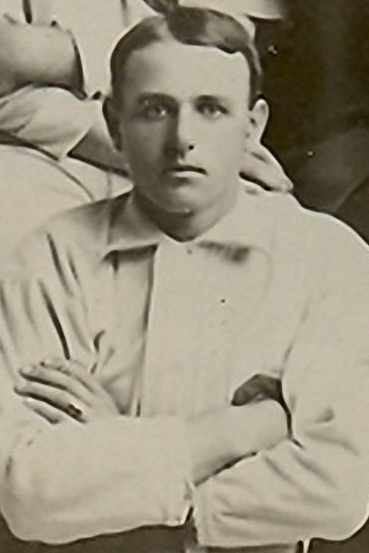
- Shortstop / Outfielder
- Born: December 10, 1866; Luthersburg, Pennsylvania, U.S.
- Died: September 9, 1944 (aged 77); Clearfield, Pennsylvania, U.S.
- Batted: Left Threw: Right

MLB debut
- August 23, 1890, for the Chicago Pirates

Last MLB appearance
- September 27, 1901, for the Chicago White Sox

MLB statistics
- Batting average: .267
- Home runs: 22
- Runs batted in: 384
- Stats at Baseball Reference

Teams
- Chicago Pirates (1890); Pittsburgh Pirates (1891–1893); St. Louis Browns (1893–1894); Louisville Colonels (1895); Philadelphia Phillies (1897); Chicago White Sox (1901)

Frank Harry Shugart (December 10, 1866 – September 9, 1944) was an American professional baseball shortstop. He played in Major League Baseball (MLB) for the Chicago Pirates, Pittsburgh Pirates, St. Louis Browns, Louisville Colonels, Philadelphia Phillies. and Chicago White Sox.

Shugart was blacklisted from baseball after the 1901 season because of an altercation on August 21, 1901, in which he punched an umpire in the face and teammate Jack Katoll beaned the umpire in the leg. Katoll only received an 11-game suspension, while Shugart never played in the Major Leagues again.
