= Jack Boyle =

American baseball player (1866–1913)

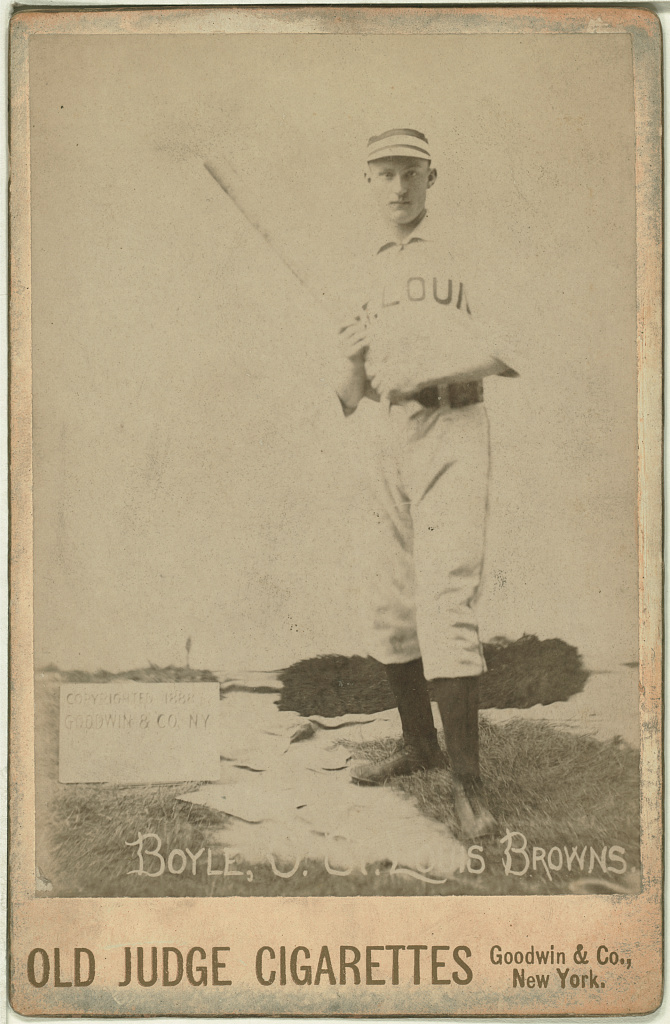
- Catcher / First baseman
- Born: March 22, 1866; Cincinnati, Ohio, U.S.
- Died: January 7, 1913 (aged 46); Cincinnati, Ohio, U.S.
- Batted: Right Threw: Right

MLB debut
- October 8, 1886, for the Cincinnati Red Stockings

Last MLB appearance
- August 16, 1898, for the Philadelphia Phillies

MLB statistics
- Batting average: .253
- Home runs: 23
- Runs batted in: 570
- Stats at Baseball Reference

Teams
- Cincinnati Red Stockings (1886); St. Louis Browns (1887–1889); Chicago Pirates (1890); St. Louis Browns (1891); New York Giants (1892); Philadelphia Phillies (1893–1898)

John Anthony Boyle (March 22, 1866 – January 7, 1913), nicknamed "Honest Jack", was an American catcher and first baseman in Major League Baseball. His younger brother, Eddie Boyle, played in 1896.

== Baseball career ==
Born in Cincinnati, Boyle began his professional baseball career in 1886, playing in one game for the Cincinnati Red Stockings of the American Association. On November 12, 1886, he was traded, along with $350, to the St. Louis Browns in exchange for Hugh Nicol.

In 1887, Boyle caught only a couple of games until July 3. Although some sources credit Boyle with having caught 87 straight games, the correct statistic is 43 straight games--after that he played right field, ending his then-record streak.

Boyle accompanied Charles Comiskey to the Chicago Pirates of the Players' League team in 1890 and returned with him to St. Louis the following year. In 1892, Boyle signed with the New York Giants for $5,500.

After one season with New York, Boyle was traded, with Jack Sharrott and cash, on March 11, 1893, to the Philadelphia Phillies in exchange for Roger Connor. Boyle spent the next five years as a catcher and first baseman for the Phillies. On July 9, 1898, he was sold by Philadelphia to the Giants for $1,000. However, he did not play a single game for them and was returned to Philadelphia on August 15, 1898.

Boyle was one of the four major league players to have played 500 games at catcher and had at least two seasons with 100 games or more at first base (with Joe Mauer, Joe Torre and Gene Tenace), he has been described as a "19th-century multi-position sensation".

Popular with fans and teammates, Boyle captained the Phillies in the mid-1890s. He also served as an umpire in the National League (4 games) and American Association (1 game) between 1888 and 1897.

The origins of Boyle's nickname are uncertain. It has been proposed that "Honest Jack" refers to his candour with his teammates and the press, or that it was originally bestowed by his teammates to distinguish him from his fellow catcher "Dirty" Jack Doyle when they both played for the Giants.

== Later life ==
Boyle opened a saloon in the Ohio River city on Seventh Street.

In 1913, Boyle died at his home in Cincinnati at the age of 46. He was interred at the St. Joseph New Cemetery in Cincinnati.

== See also ==
- List of Major League Baseball single-game hits leaders
