= Fred Pfeffer =

American baseball player (1860–1932)

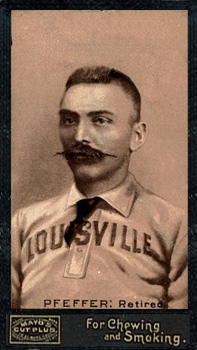
- 1895 baseball card of Pfeffer
- Second baseman
- Born: March 17, 1860; Louisville, Kentucky, U.S.
- Died: April 10, 1932 (aged 72); Chicago, Illinois, U.S.
- Batted: Right Threw: Right

MLB debut
- May 1, 1882, for the Troy Trojans

Last MLB appearance
- June 14, 1897, for the Chicago Colts

MLB statistics
- Batting average: .255
- Home runs: 94
- Runs batted in: 1,021
- Stolen bases: 383
- Stats at Baseball Reference

Teams
- As player: Troy Trojans (1882); Chicago White Stockings (1883–1889); Chicago Pirates (1890); Chicago Colts (1891); Louisville Colonels (1892–1895); New York Giants (1896); Chicago Colts (1896–1897); As manager: Louisville Colonels (1892)

Nathaniel Frederick Pfeffer (March 17, 1860 – April 10, 1932), nicknamed "Dandelion" and "Fritz", was an American baseball player. He was a second baseman in Major League Baseball between 1882 and 1897. His final game took place on June 14, 1897. During his career he played for the Troy Trojans (1882), Chicago White Stockings (1883–1889), Chicago Pirates (1890), Chicago Colts (1891, 1896–1897), Louisville Colonels (1892–1895) and New York Giants (1896).

Pfeffer was one of the last barehanded fielders in baseball, and he was the first player to foil a double steal by cutting off a catcher's throw to second base and returning it to home plate. Known as an organizer among players, Pfeffer was active in establishing the Players' League in 1890 and was involved in an attempt to reestablish the American Association in 1894. He was a manager at the collegiate and minor-league levels, and after his baseball career he ran a successful Chicago bar until Prohibition.

== Early life ==
Pfeffer was born in Louisville, Kentucky, and little is known about his family. However, his parents likely came to the U.S. from Germany, as Pfeffer spoke German fluently into adulthood. He began a three-year stint with a semipro baseball team in Louisville in 1879. In 1881, Pfeffer asserted himself as a staunch opponent to racial integration in baseball, walking off the field with teammate John Reccius when an opposing team tried to play black catcher Moses Fleetwood Walker.

== Early career ==
Pfeffer debuted in the major leagues with the Troy Trojans on May 1, 1882. Pfeffer was teammates with four future members of the Baseball Hall of Fame, but the Trojans finished in seventh place and the team was dissolved that December. After a successful trial during an exhibition series, Pfeffer was signed by the Chicago White Stockings, and he became a fan favorite among the city's German population; they dubbed him "Unser Fritz" ("Our Fritz").

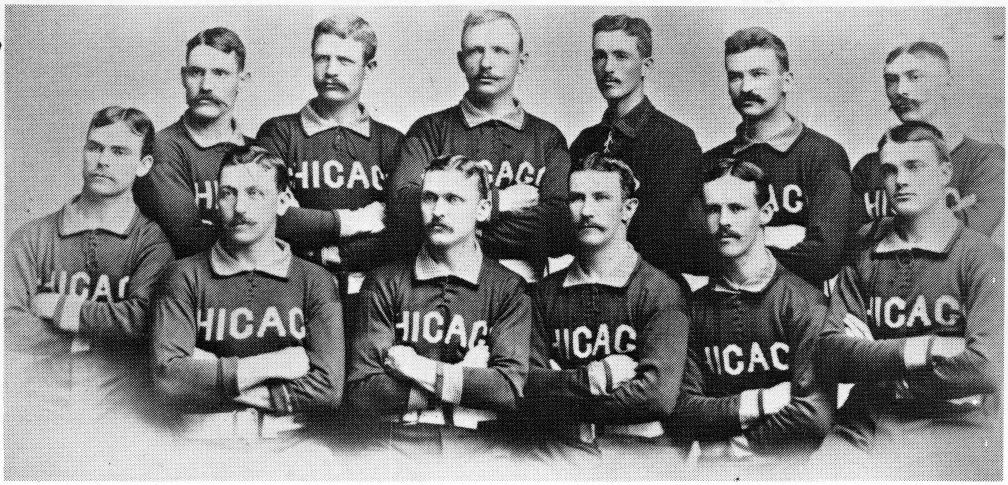
Pfeffer (top row, far right) with the 1885 Chicago White Stockings

For the next seven seasons, Pfeffer was a member of Chicago's "stonewall infield". He became known as a strong defensive player who could make difficult throws from his back or his knees. Pfeffer was one of the last players who refused to wear a baseball glove. When the opposition attempted a stolen base, he was the first major-league infielder to cut off throws from the catcher and return the ball to home plate to avoid the double steal.

Pfeffer was often among the league leaders in errors, but these totals were influenced by the fact that he was able to come close to the ball on some impossibly difficult plays. Most of his peers could not get near such difficult balls, so they were actually charged with fewer errors. Pfeffer was sometimes known as "Dandelion" because of his ability to "pick" ground balls hit in the infield.

In a game against the Detroit Wolverines on September 6, 1883, Pfeffer, Tom Burns and Ned Williamson each collected a record-breaking three hits in one inning for Chicago. The White Stockings got 18 hits and 18 runs in that inning and they won the game 26–6. No other major-league player had three hits in an inning until 1953.

In 1888, Pfeffer was a member of an American all-star baseball team that went on a world tour to Australia. The next year, Pfeffer wrote Scientific Ball, which focused on the importance of baserunning and defense. It was one of the first books about baseball. In 1890, he was also one of the organizers of the Chicago Pirates of the upstart, short-lived Players' League. He bragged that he had raised $20,000 in twenty minutes in support of the league, and he said that he could have raised five times that amount. His efforts led to the signing of Charles Comiskey as the Pirates' manager.

== Later career ==
When the Players' League folded after the 1890 season, Pfeffer fell back under contract with Chicago. Pfeffer's relationship with Chicago manager Cap Anson had long been strained, and when Anson harshly criticized the Brotherhood of Professional Base-Ball Players (the union responsible for the formation of the Players' League), relations between Pfeffer and Anson deteriorated and the two were not on speaking terms for several years. He was traded to the Louisville Colonels in exchange for Jim Canavan before the 1892 season.

In his first season with the Colonels, he served as player-manager for part of the year, assuming the managerial duties from Jack Chapman. Pfeffer played for the hapless squad through the 1895 season. Before his final year with the Colonels, Pfeffer had been forced out of the National League when it was discovered that he had been involved in an attempt to revive the American Association the year before. A petition was signed by 10,000 fans and the league allowed Pfeffer to return to the Colonels for 1895.

That year he also led the University of Wisconsin baseball team to a 10–8 win–loss record in his only season as the team's manager, and he coached for Princeton University. After playing 11 games with Louisville in 1895, Pfeffer announced that he was retiring. He signed with the New York Giants in 1896, where owner Andrew Freedman quickly suspended him, ostensibly for being in poor physical condition. Realizing that he was being blacklisted, Pfeffer quit, leading to a protracted legal battle over his pay. More than a decade later, a court awarded Pfeffer $680 in back salary.

Pfeffer re-signed with Chicago for the remainder of the 1896 season. He enjoyed significant playing time that year, but he was limited by injuries in 1897, his last year as a major-league player. After that, he played semipro baseball in Wisconsin for several years. He broke his arm while throwing a ball before the 1902 season, and that ended Pfeffer's playing career for good. Pfeffer entered coaching at the minor-league level. He managed the Decatur Commodores of the Illinois–Indiana–Iowa League in 1902. After a long hiatus from managing, he was one of three men to manage the Pawtucket Tigers minor-league team of the Colonial League in 1914.

== After baseball ==
Pfeffer owned Pfeffer's Bar, which was located behind McVicker's Theater in Chicago and which attracted both theater buffs and baseball fans. The bar was successful until the onset of Prohibition; the Chicago Tribune reported that he sold it in 1920 for $1.50. Late in his life he was a press box employee at racetracks in Chicago. Pfeffer died of heart disease at his Chicago home at age 72. He was survived by his wife, Ida. A Tribune column said that because baseball players earned unremarkable salaries, Ida had been left destitute. The Tribune said that it would forward any fan contributions to the widow.

== See also ==
- List of Major League Baseball career runs scored leaders
- List of Major League Baseball career runs batted in leaders
- List of Major League Baseball career triples leaders
- List of Major League Baseball career stolen bases leaders
- List of Major League Baseball annual saves leaders
- List of Major League Baseball player-managers
