= Phil Knell =

American baseball player (1865–1944)

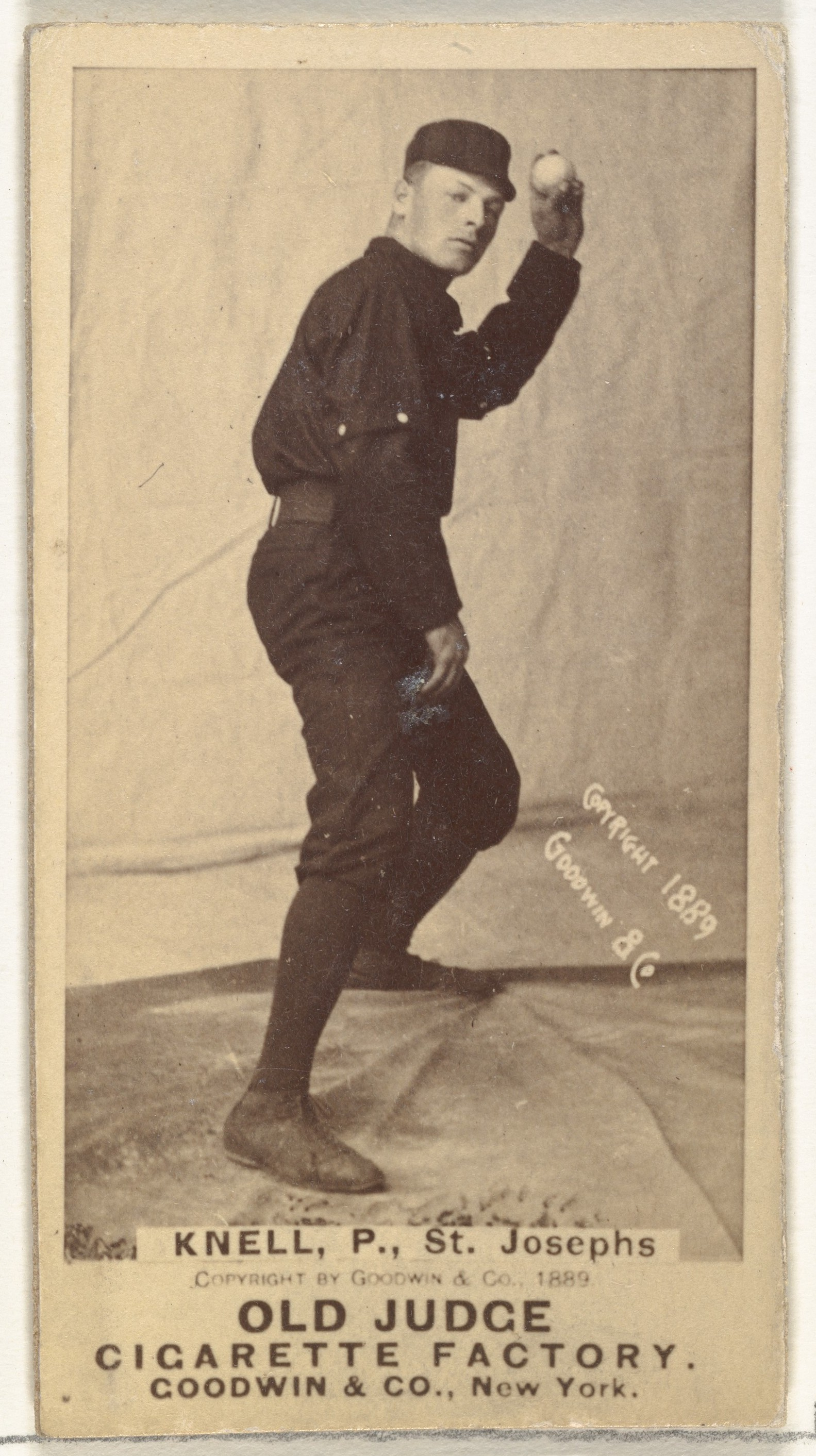
- 1889 baseball card of Knell
- Pitcher
- Born: March 12, 1865; Mill Valley, California, U.S.
- Died: June 5, 1944 (aged 79); Santa Monica, California, U.S.
- Batted: Right Threw: Left

MLB debut
- July 6, 1888, for the Pittsburgh Alleghenys

Last MLB appearance
- September 29, 1895, for the Cleveland Spiders

MLB statistics
- Win–loss record: 79–90
- Earned run average: 4.05
- Strikeouts: 575
- Stats at Baseball Reference

Teams
- Pittsburgh Alleghenys (1888); Philadelphia Athletics (1890); Columbus Solons (1891); Washington Senators (1892); Philadelphia Phillies (1892); Pittsburgh Pirates (1894); Louisville Colonels (1894–95); Cleveland Spiders (1895)

Philip Louis Knell (March 12, 1865 – June 5, 1944) was an American professional baseball pitcher from 1888 to 1908. He played in Major League Baseball (MLB) during six seasons and also spent many years in the minor leagues.

== Career ==
Knell was born in Mill Valley, California, in 1865. He started his professional baseball career in 1888, and for the next few years, he bounced around between various major and minor league teams. In 1888, Knell played for the Pittsburgh Alleghenys of the National League (NL) and had a 1–2 win–loss record and a 3.76 earned run average.

Knell made it back to the majors with the Players' League's Philadelphia Athletics in 1890. That season, he went 22–11 with a 3.83 ERA and led the league with 28 hit batsmen.

In 1891, Knell played for the American Association's Columbus Solons. In 462 innings pitched, he went 28–27 with a 2.92 ERA, a 117 ERA+, and 228 strikeouts. Knell led the league with 54 hit batsmen, which remains the MLB single-season record.

In 1892, Knell split time between the NL's Washington Senators and Philadelphia Phillies. He went 14–18 with a 3.78 ERA and led the league with 22 hit batsmen.

In 1894, Knell split time between the NL's Pittsburgh Pirates and Louisville Colonels. He went 7–21 with a 5.49 ERA.

In 1895, Knell split time between the NL's Louisville Colonels and Cleveland Spiders. He went 7–11 with a 5.76 ERA.

Knell finished his MLB career with 1452.1 innings pitched, a 79–90 win–loss record, a 4.05 ERA, a 99 ERA+, 575 strikeouts, and 136 hit batsmen. He continued playing in the minors through 1908. In a 1910 interview, Ping Bodie acknowledged Knell as his first baseball mentor.

Knell died in Santa Monica, California, in 1944.

== See also ==
- List of Major League Baseball career hit batsmen leaders
- List of Major League Baseball annual shutout leaders
