= Chicago Pirates =

Player's League baseball team in 1890

Information
- League: Players' League (1890)
- Location: Chicago, Illinois
- Ballpark: South Side Park (II)
- Founded: 1890
- Folded: 1890
- Manager: Charles Comiskey

The Chicago Pirates were a baseball team in the Players' League for a single season in 1890. The team played their home games at South Side Park (II). Their rivals were the National League Chicago Colts, which later became the Chicago Cubs.

The Pirates recruited most of the Colts' players, and for this reason the Pirates’ attendance was nearly fifty percent higher than the White Stockings. The Pirates’ owner, John Addison, was a wealthy contractor. Although Addison and his partner White Stocking second baseman Fred Pfeffer had signed mostly White Stocking players, they also signed four players from the St. Louis Browns of the American Association as well as a pitcher from the Columbus Solons of the American Association. The team was managed by Charles Comiskey.

== Notable players ==
- Charles Comiskey
- Hugh Duffy
- Silver King
- Jimmy Ryan
- Ned Williamson
- Tip O'Neill

Comiskey and Duffy are members of the Baseball Hall of Fame. On June 21, 1890, Silver King pitched the only ever Player's League no-hitter.

The team had two nicknames: 1) White Stockings — the players wore white hose, which was appropriate because this PL franchise signed away many NL Chicago White Stocking players, 2) Pirates — name applied not for "pirating" away NL players but rather because the team "pirated" many victories with late inning comebacks in games in which they trailed early.

== See also ==
- 1890 Chicago Pirates season
- Chicago Pirates all-time roster
