= Ultimate Fighting Championship controversies =

The American-based Ultimate Fighting Championship (UFC) is the largest mixed martial arts (MMA) promotion in the world. Since its inception in 1993, the UFC has been the subject of controversies, ranging from moral condemnation of its events by politicians, which resulted in MMA being banned in many US states during the late 90's to mid 2010's, to criticism for underpaying its athletes and for criminal behavior committed by its fighters.

== State and television bans ==
In 1996, United States senator John McCain saw a UFC tape and found it "barbaric". Stating that it was "not a sport", he sent letters to all 50 US governors asking them to ban "human cockfighting". The American Medical Association also recommended a ban. David Plotz of Slate reported that critics also found the chain-link fenced octagon that the combatants fought in to be "grotesque" and demanded that ropes be installed instead. 36 states enacted laws that banned "no holds barred" fighting (the term "mixed martial arts" was not yet being used). In early 1997, McCain became chairman of the United States Senate Committee on Commerce, Science, and Transportation, which oversees the cable television industry. In April 1997, the president of the National Cable Television Association warned that UFC broadcasts could jeopardize the cable industry's influence in Washington, D.C., despite the fact that the UFC at the time only aired on pay-per-view. TWC, TCI, Request TV, Cablevision Systems, Viewer's Choice, and other major operators stopped airing UFC events, as being too violent for children. Between 1997 and 1998, the UFC instituted more safety rules, such as imposing weight classes and a "10-point must" scoring system, banning head butts and groin strikes, and requiring fighters to wear martial arts gloves. In 2000, California became the first state to implement a set of codified rules governing MMA, quickly followed by New Jersey. In 2016, New York became the 50th and final US state to legalize MMA.

== Fighter pay and medical coverage ==
The UFC has long been criticized for underpaying its fighters. Karim Zidan of The Guardian reported in December 2022 that, unlike the vast majority of sports leagues and organizations, where athletes receive between 47% and 50% of the sport's revenue, the UFC has historically paid out between 16 and 19% of its revenues to its fighters. In 2021, John S. Nash of Bloody Elbow reported that since 2005, fighter pay fluctuated between 15 and 22% of the UFC's revenue. In contrast, rival promotion Bellator MMA paid their fighters 44.7% of their revenue between 2010 and 2016, while Strikeforce (active in MMA promotion from 2006 to 2013) reportedly paid their fighters 63%. Northwestern University labor law professor Zev Eigen told the Bleacher Report in 2013, that Eddie Alvarez's UFC contract was the worst he had seen in the sports or entertainment fields; "There's nothing that sets a minimum or basic standard" of pay that the company can not go below. Eigen called the confidentiality clause prohibiting a fighter from revealing how much they are paid a violation of the National Labor Relations Act of 1935. In 2016, James Quinn of the law firm Weil, Gotshal & Manges, called Georges St-Pierre's UFC contract "something out of the 1940s" and was "blown away" by how restrictive it was; "They're basically tying him up for life. They have no rights and they own all of his licensing and all the other things. It's unheard of in the other professional sports." In 2020, sports journalist Bryant Gumbel called the UFC, "the one sport [sic] in which the athletes seem to have the fewest rights and arguably the least say in their own safety". Marc Raimondi of ESPN wrote that it is common for UFC fighters to go into fights with injuries because they do not get paid unless they fight.

The UFC maintains that its fighters are independent contractors, not employees, and therefore lack the right to unionize under federal law. Sports agent Jeff Borris said, "if you analyze the situation, they're employees. [The UFC] tells them when to fight, where to fight, and whom to fight. They tell them what they can wear [...] and also prevent them from fighting for other promotions." A 2020 poll conducted by The Athletic found that out of 170 mixed martial artists, 79.4% said they were in favor of organizing in a way comparable to the professional unions and associations in other sports. According to Borris, the UFC is against unionization because "They would have to fund things like medical insurance and pensions, share in the licensing and other revenue streams that they don't want to do." The UFC has "vigorously opposed" the efforts of Markwayne Mullin to expand the Muhammad Ali Boxing Reform Act, which helps protect fighters' interests from promoters, to cover mixed martial artists, including by paying lobbyists.

Because they are labeled independent contractors, the UFC does not provide long-term health insurance to its fighters. For years, the company only formally offered medical benefits to fighters on its active roster who suffered immediate injuries as a result of fights. Raimondi wrote that this is another reason UFC fighters go into their matches with injuries; to make it seem as if the injury occurred during the bout, as otherwise the fighter has to pay out of pocket. In May 2011, coverage of injuries occurring during training camps for UFC fights were added to the company's policy. The UFC does not offer a pension plan for fighters dealing with injuries after they retire from competition.

The UFC has policies that indirectly limit a fighter's financial opportunities. UFC contracts have exclusivity provisions, meaning the fighter can not compete in other MMA organizations or even other sports while under contract. This specific provision is partly the source of a civil lawsuit brought against the UFC by several of its former fighters that alleges the company exercises monopoly and monopsony power in violation of the Sherman Antitrust Act. (See Ultimate Fighting Championship#Class action lawsuits). Since 2014, the UFC has had deals with specific apparel companies to exclusively provide uniforms that all fighters must wear, limiting the sponsorship opportunities of its athletes. Scott Coker, president of rival promotion Bellator MMA, stated, "they're independent contractors. How they're forced to wear a uniform, to this day, still baffles me. It should be against the labor laws or something." Before implementing uniforms, the UFC had a "sponsor tax" requiring businesses to pay them a fee before their logos could be placed on a fighter's apparel.

== 2012 ==
=== UFC 151 cancellation ===
UFC 151 was scheduled to take place on September 1, 2012, headlined by Jon Jones defending the UFC Light Heavyweight Championship against Dan Henderson. On August 23, UFC president Dana White announced that Henderson had sustained a partial rupture of his medial collateral ligament and had withdrawn from the fight. White then announced via press conference that UFC 151 would be the first event in the organization's history to be cancelled, after Jones declined to fight new opponent Chael Sonnen on eight days' notice. White blamed the cancellation on Jones and his coach Greg Jackson, stating that UFC 151 would be "remembered as the event Jon Jones and Greg Jackson murdered". Jackson had advised Jones against accepting the fight with Sonnen on what equated to three days' notice when factoring in weight-cutting and media responsibilities, due to him having a "completely different style" than Henderson. Some MMA analysts see the UFC as being at fault for putting together a "relatively weak" undercard that could not be salvaged after losing the main event. By holding events nearly every weekend, the organization's pool of fighters available as substitutes when injuries occur is shallow. CBS Sports columnist Gregg Doyel argued White's mishandling of UFC 151 proved that UFC fighters need a union, stating: "...fights fall through all the time – the flimsy card fell apart. This was the UFC's fault. This was UFC president Dana White's fault." Cory Braiterman of MMA Mania called White's behavior "appalling". He wrote that the UFC tried to "blackmail" Jones by telling him they were going to cancel the event if he did not fight, but "Jones is not paid to look after the well-being of other fighters. The head honchos were the ones who made [the cancellation] decision and the blame lies squarely on them." Henderson was also criticized when it later emerged that he had been injured three weeks prior to the announcement and kept quiet about it as he still hoped to compete.

== 2015 ==
=== Tae Hyun Bang vs. Leo Kuntz ===
In the hours leading up to UFC Fight Night: Henderson vs. Masvidal on November 28, 2015, betting on a match between South Korean Tae Hyun Bang and American Leo Kuntz saw a massive swing in Kuntz's favor, raising suspicions of match-fixing. However, Bang won the fight by split decision, seemingly contradicting a fix. In August 2017, South Korean prosecutors indicted Bang for alleged involvement in match-fixing. Chris Taylor of BJPenn.com reported that Bang was convinced by South Korean gambling brokers to throw his fight and the brokers then bet nearly US$2 million on Kuntz. Bang, who was paid US$92,610 to take the fall, then bet roughly US$44,000 on Kuntz. However, UFC officials who noticed the odd betting warned both fighters about match fixing before the bout, and Bang subsequently decided to fight for real, leading to his win. As a result of his change of heart, Bang reportedly received death threats and explained the situation to South Korean police. On November 24, 2017, the Seoul Central District Court sentenced Bang to 10 months in prison for accepting money to throw the fight. The three people who gave him the money also received jail terms.

=== UFC-Reebok Deal ===
On December 2, 2014, the UFC and Reebok held a press conference to announce an exclusive deal for Reebok to become the worldwide outfitter for the UFC, beginning in July 2015. Financial terms of the six-year partnership were not released, but UFC officials said that though the agreement represents the most valuable non-broadcast contract the company has ever signed, the UFC will not directly profit from the new deal. Instead, company execs said the deal is structured so that the "vast majority of the revenue" from the deal – taking out only the costs associated with administering the new program – will be paid directly to UFC fighters. Due to this new deal, fighters will no longer be allowed to display their sponsor's logos during a UFC broadcast.

However, many fighters claim that the new Reebok deal has caused them to lose income from sponsors, since they are no longer able to advertise their logos in the cage. They claim that the income gained from Reebok does not outweigh the income lost from the loss of their sponsors. Additionally, fighters and fans have expressed displeasure with the design of the new gear. The official announcement of the new designs included many spelling errors and other mistakes. These included the misspelling of Gilbert Melendez's first name as "Giblert", placing the Korean flag on Benson Henderson's kit (Henderson was born and raised in the United States), and mistakenly printing Ronaldo Souza's nickname, "Jacare", instead of his first name.

== 2016 ==
=== UFC 199 MMA Fighting ban ===
On June 4, 2016, MMA Fighting journalists Ariel Helwani, Casey Lyden and Esther Lin were escorted out of UFC 199 before the main event started. Their press credentials were taken and they were banned for life from all UFC events. UFC president Dana White announced that the ban would last "As long as I'm here." and reputedly later added "[Helwani] can cover all the events he wants, he just can't have a credential". Earlier in the day, Helwani had reported that Brock Lesnar would be returning at UFC 200, hours before the UFC announced it on the 199 broadcast. UFC spokesman Dave Sholler said "professional standards dictate that journalists are to contact the UFC for comment before reporting a story", but that the scoop on Lesnar's return was not the sole reason for Helwani's removal. UFC commentator Joe Rogan stated that he was told the UFC had asked Helwani to not report the news as they suspected he had a mole leaking information to him and, without knowing who it was, would fire all possible suspects if he did. Through Twitter, Helwani called Rogan's story "100% inaccurate". On an episode of The MMA Hour, Helwani detailed the incident in an emotional broadcast. He said he was brought to see Dana White, who told him he was banned for being "too negative". He later learned this decision was made by then-UFC CEO and Zuffa founder Lorenzo Fertitta. Helwani stood by his decision to report the news in a timely manner.

The UFC's actions were widely criticized by journalists, who noted that the ban overshadowed the fights of UFC 199. Les Carpenter of The Guardian wrote, "By banning journalists in an obsessive desire to control the message, the world's biggest mixed martial arts promotion comes off as petty and small-time." Two days later, the UFC rescinded the ban on June 6, 2016, stating:

Following a conversation with the editorial team at SB Nation, UFC will not prevent MMAFighting.com from receiving media credentials to cover live UFC events. We respect the role the media plays in our sport and beyond, including MMAFighting's ability to report news. However, in our opinion, we believe the recurring tactics used by its lead reporter extended beyond the purpose of journalism. We feel confident our position has now been adequately communicated to the SB Nation editorial team.

Helwani credited the reactions from the media and fans for forcing the UFC to lift the ban. The UFC 199 incident facilitated the June 2017 formation of the Mixed Martial Arts Journalists Association, with interim president Dann Stupp stating "Our initial efforts in 2009 never got off the ground, but we're doing this now because it's become increasingly obvious that it's long overdue".

== 2018 ==
=== Khabib Nurmagomedov and Conor McGregor ===
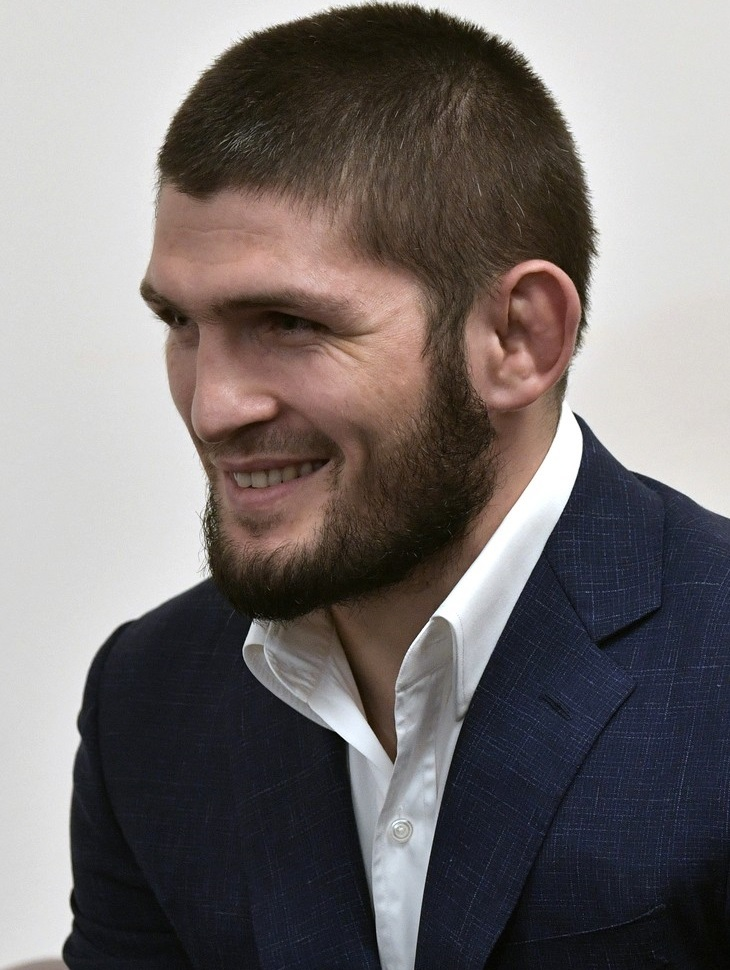
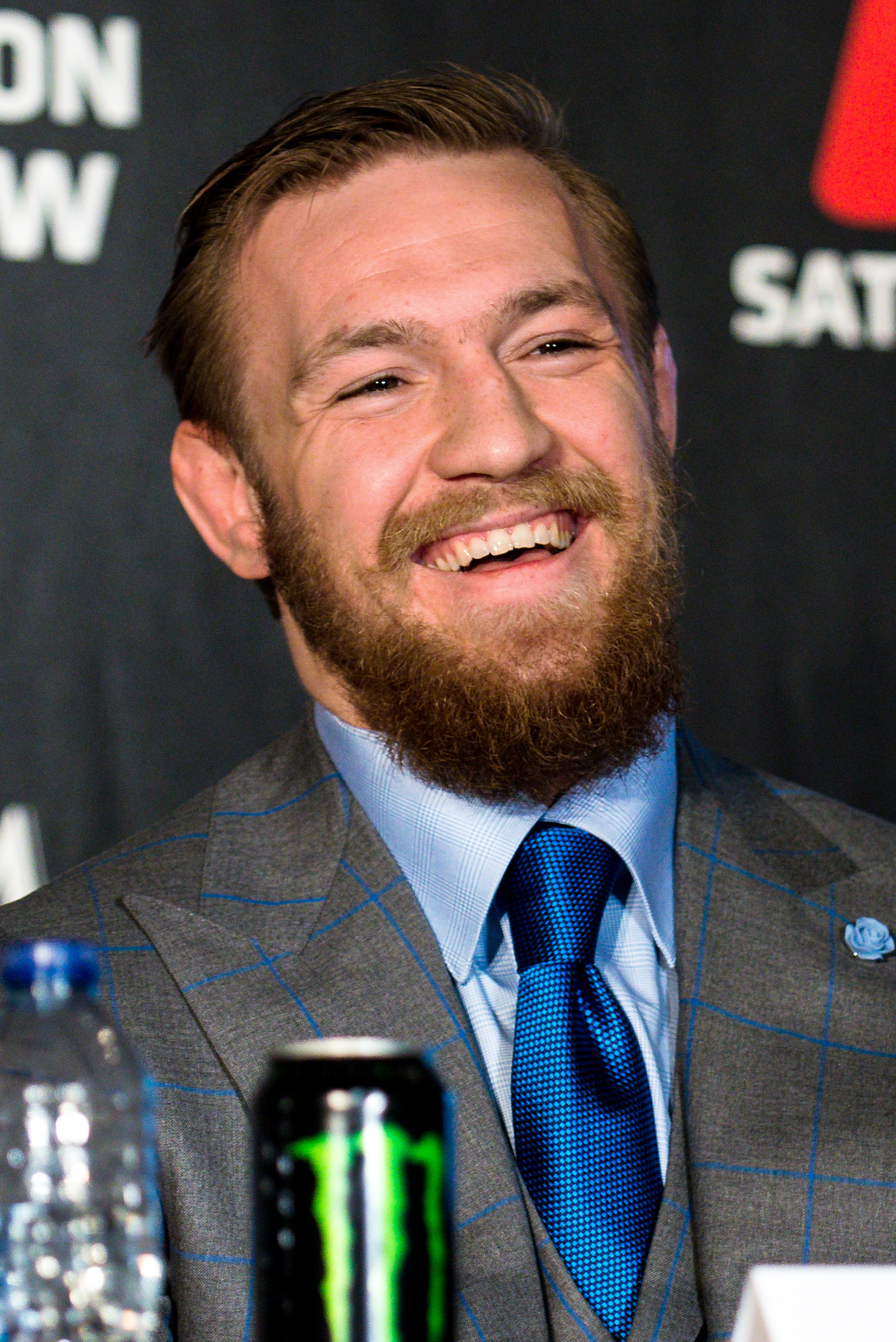
Khabib Nurmagomedov (above) and Conor McGregor (below) had highly publicized physical altercations in 2018.

==== UFC 223 bus attack ====
On April 3, 2018, Khabib Nurmagomedov and Artem Lobov had an altercation, in which Nurmagomedov and his entourage cornered Lobov and slapped him multiple times. Lobov is known to be close to Conor McGregor, with whom Nurmagomedov previously had verbal altercations and trash talk exchanges. Two days later, during promotional appearances for UFC 223, McGregor and his Straight Blast Gym - Ireland entourage, including Lobov, stormed into the Barclays Center to confront Nurmagomedov, who was on a bus leaving the arena with other fighters for UFC 223 on board, including Rose Namajunas, Michael Chiesa, and Ray Borg. When Nurmagomedov did not leave the bus, McGregor threw various objects, including a long metal crowd control barrier and a trash can, at the vehicle. When the bus slowly moved to depart, McGregor ran up alongside and threw a metal equipment dolly, smashing one of the windows, before throwing other objects in the vicinity. McGregor and others involved fled the Barclays Center in two waiting cars. Chiesa and Borg were injured by shattered glass, and sent to a hospital. They were soon removed from the card on the advice of the New York State Athletic Commission and the UFC's medical team. Namajunas was shaken up, and a UFC employee had also suffered a broken knuckle. Lobov, who was set to fight Alex Caceres, was removed from the UFC 223 card due to being present at the incident.

UFC president Dana White called the incident "the most disgusting thing that has happened in the history of the company", and said there was a warrant out for McGregor's arrest, with the NYPD labeling McGregor a person of interest. McGregor later turned himself in to a police station, where he faced three counts of assault and one count of criminal mischief. He was further charged with menacing and reckless endangerment at his arraignment and released on $50,000 bail until June 14, 2018. McGregor later pleaded no contest to a count of disorderly conduct and was ordered to perform five days of community service and attend anger management classes. In September 2018, Chiesa sued McGregor for "negligence, negligent infliction of emotional distress, intentional infliction of emotional distress, assault and battery, among other claims". In December 2022, both parties reached a settlement, the details of which were not disclosed.

Despite White's previous comments condemning the incident, he had an immediate and "totally predictable about-face" according to Chad Dundas of Bleacher Report, and the UFC liberally used footage of it to promote the fight between Nurmagomedov and McGregor at UFC 229, six months later. Dundas proposed that the UFC's reaction showed any behavior is acceptable to them so long as it earns money and also pointed out how Lobov was punished by the UFC, but not McGregor; "if anybody not named Conor McGregor had chucked that dolly, they would've been looking for a new job before the glass hit the floor of the Barclays Center. In the UFC, however, it's economics over everything. At this point, even the law." MMA journalist John Morgan reflected on the bus incident in 2020, stating that "it changed things. The UFC now has added security guards in every host hotel."

==== UFC 229 brawl ====
On October 6, 2018, following his victory over Conor McGregor at UFC 229, Khabib Nurmagomedov jumped over the octagon fence and charged at McGregor's cornerman, Dillon Danis. Danis had reportedly shouted insults at Nurmagomedov. Soon afterwards, McGregor and Abubakar Nurmagomedov, Khabib's cousin, attempted to exit the octagon, but a scuffle broke out between them after McGregor punched Abubakar, who then punched him back. McGregor was then attacked from behind inside the octagon by two of Nurmagomedov's cornermen, Zubaira Tukhugov and Esed Emiragaev. Tukhugov, who was scheduled to fight Artem Lobov, the McGregor team member who was assaulted by Khabib and others in April 2018 (see above), at UFC Fight Night: Volkan vs. Smith on October 27, 2018, was removed from the card on October 17.

Three of Nurmagomedov's teammates were arrested, but released after McGregor declined to press charges. Nurmagomedov's payment for UFC 229 was withheld by the Nevada State Athletic Commission (NSAC), pending an investigation into his actions. The NSAC filed a formal complaint against both Nurmagomedov and McGregor, and on October 24, voted to approve a motion to release half of Nurmagomedov's $2 million fight payout immediately. Both Nurmagomedov and McGregor received indefinite bans until an official hearing would determine the disciplinary outcome of the post-fight brawl. On January 29, 2019, the NSAC announced a nine-month suspension for Nurmagomedov (retroactive to October 6, 2018) and a $500,000 fine. McGregor received a six-month suspension and $50,000 fine, while Abubakar Nurmagomedov and Zubaira Tukhugov each received 12-month suspensions and fines of $25,000.

== 2022 ==
=== Scale gate ===
Charles Oliveira was set to defend the UFC Lightweight Championship against Justin Gaethje at UFC 274 on May 7, 2022. At the weigh-ins, Oliveira weighed in at 155.5 pounds, half a pound over the lightweight divisional title limit. As a result, upon commencement of the fight, Oliveira was officially stripped of the championship, and only Gaethje was eligible to win the title. This was the first time in UFC history that a title was vacated due to a weight miss. The decision to strip Oliveira of the championship proved controversial in what was dubbed "scale gate", as other fighters on the UFC 274 card alleged issues with the scales. Marc Ratner, Vice President of Regulatory Affairs at the UFC, stated that the other fighters were referring to the UFC's practice scale put out the night before, not the one used by the Arizona State Athletic Commission for the official weigh-in; "Some fighters wanted to change the scale from pounds to kilograms, which you can do, and I think that may have knocked it – we don't have any proof of anything, but it may have knocked the [practice] scale out of calibration." The night before, Oliveira had stated that he was on weight using the practice scale. As a result of the allegations, UFC president Dana White stated that the UFC would hire a security guard to watch the practice scale going forward. Ariel Helwani and Dustin Poirier questioned why state athletic commissions still use balance or beam scales, which allow human error, for official weights and not more accurate digital scales. Daniel Cormier, Junior dos Santos, and Glover Teixeira criticized stripping a champion over half a pound, an amount that is acceptable for non-title fights, as excessive. In addition to citing previous UFC matches that were allowed to go ahead as championship title fights despite questionable weigh-ins, Helwani noted how state athletic commissions have no say in what happens to a championship belt and that it was entirely the UFC's decision to strip Oliveira of the title.

=== UFC 279 press conference cancellation ===
The September 8, 2022, press conference for UFC 279 was cancelled midway through due to a backstage scuffle. All six fighters in the last three bouts of the event were expected to participate, however after a lengthy delay, UFC President Dana White appeared only with Kevin Holland and Daniel Rodriguez and announced that the fighters would be brought in pairs. However, after Holland and Rodriguez departed, White spoke to members of his public relations staff and security before announcing that the rest of the press conference was cancelled for "everybody's safety". It was later revealed that a brawl involving multiple fighters and their entourages took place backstage, initiated by Holland and Khamzat Chimaev, with Nate Diaz eventually getting involved. According to Li Jingliang, Chimaev approached Holland and "I don't know why, maybe Kevin felt he was a little bit aggressive, and then he just pushed him — Kevin pushed Khamzat. And then Khamzat just went backward and came back with that kick at Holland, and so then they threw punches and kicks to each other." After the parties were separated, the UFC decided to hold the press conference with the fighters in pairs. But while Holland and Rodriguez were on stage, Diaz appeared and said something to Khamzat before throwing a water bottle at him. As a result, White called off the whole press conference. White later blamed a lack of security backstage for allowing the volatile situation to boil over, and said that was something the UFC will remedy in the future. On September 12, the Nevada State Athletic Commission announced that they were investigating the incident and would discipline all licensees "for all incidents of physical violence between athletes outside the ring or cage".

=== Betting fraud investigation ===
A call for a sports betting fraud investigation was made on a UFC fight involving Darrick Minner and Shayilan Nuerdanbieke at UFC Fight Night: Rodriguez vs. Lemos on November 5, 2022. Suspicious betting patterns were observed on the fight by sportsbooks; including a drastic shift for Nuerdanbieke to win by knockout/technical knockout in the first round, with betting continuing relentlessly even after the odds moved to significantly less attractive prices. After being notified of the unusual betting, U.S. Integrity, a Las Vegas-based betting integrity firm, alerted state gaming regulators and other sportsbook clients to the irregular betting roughly three hours before the fight began. During the first round of the fight, Minner's leg appeared injured after throwing a kick, and Nuerdanbieke won by TKO shortly thereafter. It was later revealed that Minner had an undisclosed knee injury heading into the fight. Many speculated that Minner threw the fight, or that James Krause, Minner's coach who cornered him in the fight and has been open about betting on fights involving his own fighters in the past, placed a bet on Nuerdanbieke with his insider information. On November 18, the Nevada State Athletic Commission (NSAC) informed the UFC and Krause that Krause's license was suspended and would remain so during the course of an investigation. The following day, the New Jersey Division of Gaming Enforcement prohibited their state's sportsbooks from accepting bets on any fight that Krause is involved in. On December 1, the Alcohol and Gaming Commission of Ontario (AGCO) banned gambling on any UFC fight due to the alleged incidents. The Alberta Gaming, Liquor and Cannabis Commission followed suit the next day, but reversed the decision just one week later. Also on December 2, the UFC announced that they had been cooperating with "multiple ongoing government investigations" into the Minner and Nuerdanbieke fight and that any fighters "who choose to continue to be coached by Krause or who continue to train in his gym will not be permitted to participate in UFC events pending the outcome" of the investigations. The UFC released Minner from his contract that same day. On December 9, ESPN reported that the Federal Bureau of Investigation was collecting information regarding the Minner and Nuerdanbieke fight. Mixed martial artist Jeff Molina, who trained with Krause for years, was suspended by the NSAC on December 13, 2022, for being "involved in some substantial way in the gaming scheme". On January 17, 2023, the UFC announced they will not book Molina in any bouts pending the outcome of the investigation.

On December 9, 2022, Karim Zidan wrote an article for The Guardian where he opined that the UFC only has itself to blame for the betting controversy. In stark contrast to other major sports entities, the UFC does not prohibit insiders – such as coaches, managers, handlers and medical professionals – from betting on its fights. The AGCO also blamed the UFC for being the reason they had to ban gambling on any UFC fight, citing the same lack of policies. Prior to an amendment to its code of conduct on October 17, 2022, less than one month before the Minner and Nuerdanbieke fight, the UFC did not have any restrictions on fighters and their teams from betting on fights whatsoever, including their own. Zidan also wrote that the UFC's "mistreatment of its fighters" helped create the conditions for the betting scandal, as its underpaid and under-insured fighters must seek alternative sources of income. On January 19, 2023, the UFC amended their code of conduct policy to prohibit "an athlete's coaches, managers, handlers, athletic trainers, and other individuals affiliated with the athletes or UFC" from gambling on any UFC match. The AGCO reinstated betting on UFC fights that same day as a result of the change.

== 2025 ==
=== Alleged match-fixing controversy ===
During the UFC Fight Night: Garcia vs. Onama on November 1, 2025, held at UFC Apex in Enterprise, Nevada, betting lines for featherweight fighter Isaac Dulgarian shifted dramatically just before, and during, his bout against Yadier del Valle. Dulgarian, whom was initially listed as a heavy favorite, saw his odds drop significantly during the fight and some sportsbooks removed the prop bets surrounding the fight like betting on a first-round finish. The irregular betting lines raised suspicion across the MMA community the following day. On November 4 the UFC issued a statement regarding the irregular betting patterns: "Like many professional sports organizations, UFC works with an independent betting integrity service to monitor wagering activity on our events... Our betting integrity partner, IC360, monitors wagering on every UFC event and is conducting a thorough review of the facts surrounding the Dulgarian vs. del Valle bout on Saturday, November 1." Adding, "We take these allegations very seriously, and along with the health and safety of our fighters, nothing is more important than the integrity of our sport." Dulgarian was released from the UFC the day after the event, while the Nevada State Athletic Commission (NSAC) withheld his entire fight purse.

Speaking to TMZ, UFC President Dana White later stated that he was alerted by sports betting watchdog Integrity Compliance 360 (IC360) of abnormal betting interest between Yadier del Valle and Isaac Dulgarian. Following the fight, White immediately contacted the Federal Bureau of Investigation (FBI). An FBI investigation is still ongoing.
