= Barry Bonds =

American baseball player (born 1964)

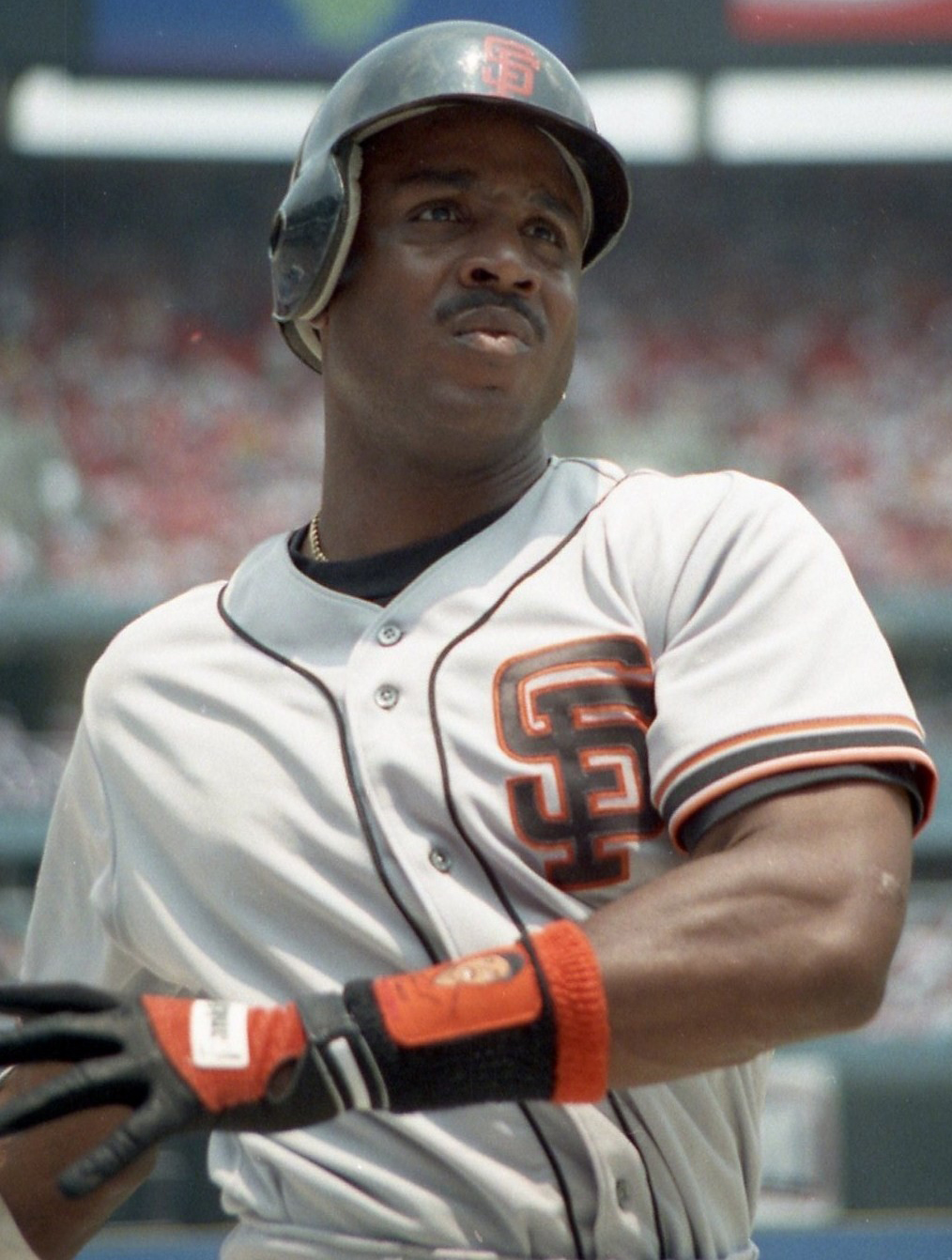
- Bonds with the San Francisco Giants in 1993
- Left fielder
- Born: July 24, 1964 (age 62); Riverside, California, U.S.
- Batted: Left Threw: Left

MLB debut
- May 30, 1986, for the Pittsburgh Pirates

Last MLB appearance
- September 26, 2007, for the San Francisco Giants

MLB statistics
- Batting average: .298
- Hits: 2,935
- Home runs: 762
- Runs batted in: 1,996
- Stolen bases: 514
- Walks: 2,558
- Stats at Baseball Reference

Teams
- As player: Pittsburgh Pirates (1986–1992); San Francisco Giants (1993–2007); As coach: Miami Marlins (2016)

Career highlights and awards
- 14× All-Star (1990, 1992–1998, 2000–2004, 2007); 7× NL MVP (1990, 1992, 1993, 2001–2004); 8× Gold Glove Award (1990–1994, 1996–1998); 12× Silver Slugger Award (1990–1994, 1996, 1997, 2000–2004); 3× NL Hank Aaron Award (2001, 2002, 2004); 2× NL batting champion (2002, 2004); 2× NL home run leader (1993, 2001); NL RBI leader (1993); Commissioner's Historic Achievement Award; San Francisco Giants No. 25 retired; Pittsburgh Pirates Hall of Fame; San Francisco Giants Wall of Fame; MLB records: 762 career home runs; 73 home runs, single season; 2,558 career walks; 232 walks, single season; .609 on-base percentage, single season
Medals
Men's baseball
Representing United States
Amateur World Series
Bronze medal – third place	1984 Cuba	Team

Barry Lamar Bonds (born July 24, 1964) is an American former professional baseball left fielder who played 22 seasons in Major League Baseball (MLB). He was a member of the Pittsburgh Pirates from 1986 to 1992 and the San Francisco Giants from 1993 to 2007. Bonds is widely considered to be one of the greatest baseball players of all time.

Recognized as an all-around player, Bonds received a record seven National League (NL) Most Valuable Player Awards and 12 Silver Slugger Awards, along with 14 All-Star selections. He holds many MLB hitting records, including most career home runs (762), most home runs in a single season (73, set in 2001), and the records for the most walks and intentional walks in a career, season, and in consecutive games. Bonds led MLB in on-base plus slugging six times and placed within the top five hitters in 12 of his 17 qualifying seasons. For his defensive play in the outfield, he won eight Gold Glove Awards. He also had 514 stolen bases, becoming the first and only MLB player to date with at least 500 home runs and 500 stolen bases. Bonds is ranked first in career Wins Above Replacement among all Major League position players by Baseball Reference and second by FanGraphs, behind only Babe Ruth.

Despite his accolades, Bonds led a controversial career, notably as a central figure in baseball's steroids scandal. He was indicted in 2007 on charges of perjury and obstruction of justice for allegedly lying to a grand jury during the federal government's investigation of BALCO, a manufacturer of an undetectable steroid. After the perjury charges were dropped, Bonds was convicted of obstruction of justice in 2011, but was exonerated on appeal in 2015. During his 10 years of eligibility, he did not receive the 75% of the vote needed to be elected to the National Baseball Hall of Fame. Some voters of the Baseball Writers' Association of America (BBWAA) stated they did not vote for Bonds because they believe he used performance-enhancing drugs.

== Early life ==
Barry Lamar Bonds was born on July 24, 1964, in Riverside, California, to Patricia (née Howard) and then-future Major League right fielder Bobby Bonds. Bonds grew up on the San Francisco Peninsula in San Carlos, California, where he attended Arundel Elementary School. His father spent the first seven seasons of his Major League career with the San Francisco Giants, where he played with future National Baseball Hall of Famers Willie Mays, Gaylord Perry, Willie McCovey, and Juan Marichal. His father Bobby played in right field and with Mays playing in center field, the Giants had a venerable defensive tandem that worked together to cover a lot of ground on the field, and Mays became Barry's godfather. As a child, Bonds would spend time in the Giants home clubhouse and dugout at Candlestick Park and had to choke up on his baseball bat that he carried around because it was too heavy for him at the time, something that he would stick with for the rest of his life. Before Arundel, he attended the Carey School, which overlooks Junípero Serra High School in San Mateo, California, where he would also later attend. He excelled in baseball, basketball, and football. He played on the junior varsity team during his freshman year and on the varsity team for the remainder of his high school career. Frustrated with Bonds’ progress in junior biology, his teacher told him that baseball will never get him anywhere.

Bonds garnered a .467 batting average his senior year, and was named prep All-American. The Giants drafted Bonds in the second round (39th overall) of the 1982 MLB draft as a high school senior, but the Giants and Bonds were unable to agree on contract terms when Tom Haller's maximum offer was $70,000 ($230,000 today) and Bonds's minimum to go pro was $75,000, and Mays helped advise Bonds to instead attend college. Bonds, along with late Major League Baseball pitcher Danny Frisella, were inducted into the Serra Athletics Hall of Fame in 1992.

== College career ==
Bonds attended Arizona State University, where his distant cousin and fellow university Hall of Fame right fielder Reggie Jackson attended and played as well. Bonds hit .347 with 45 home runs and 175 runs batted in (RBI). In 1984, he batted .360 and had 30 stolen bases. In 1985, he hit 23 home runs with 66 RBI and a .368 batting average. He was a Sporting News All-American selection that year. He tied the NCAA record with seven consecutive hits in the College World Series as a sophomore and was named to All-Time College World Series Team in 1996.

Bonds was not well-liked by his Sun Devil teammates, in part because in the words of longtime coach Jim Brock, he was "rude, inconsiderate and self-centered". When he was suspended for breaking curfew, the other players initially voted against his return even though he was easily the best player on the team. He graduated from Arizona State in 1986 with a degree in criminology. He was named ASU On Deck Circle Most Valuable Player; other winners include Dustin Pedroia, Willie Bloomquist, Paul Lo Duca, and Ike Davis. During college, he played part of one summer in the amateur Alaska Baseball League with the Alaska Goldpanners. Bonds was inducted into the Sun Devil Hall of Fame 1999 Class.

== Professional career ==
=== Draft and minor leagues ===
The Pittsburgh Pirates drafted Bonds with the sixth overall pick of the 1985 Major League Baseball draft. He joined the Prince William Pirates of the Carolina League and was named July 1985 Player of the Month for the league. In 1986, he hit .311 with seven home runs and 37 RBI in 44 games for the Hawaii Islanders of the Pacific Coast League.

=== Pittsburgh Pirates (1986–1992) ===
==== 1986 season ====
Before Bonds made it to the Major Leagues in Pittsburgh, Pirate fan attendance was low, with 1984 and 1985 attendance below 10,000 per game for the 81-game home schedule, with attendance woes being a combination of the economic problems of Western Pennsylvania in the early 1980s as well as the Pittsburgh drug trials that directly affected the Pirates going from World Series champions to nearly relocating to Denver, Colorado in only six years. On May 30, 1986, at Three Rivers Stadium, Bonds made his Major League debut, starting in center field and wearing jersey number 7. He finished the game 0-for-5 with a walk in a 6–4 loss to the Los Angeles Dodgers.

On June 4, at Atlanta–Fulton County Stadium, in a 12–3 win over the Atlanta Braves, Bonds hit his first career Major League home run, an opposite field solo home run with two outs in the top of the fifth inning. Leading 10–2, Bonds hit a fly ball well off of pitcher Craig McMurtry to deep left field and over Gerald Perry and the fence, making the score 11–2. Bonds hit his first home run in the exact same part of the exact same ballpark where Hank Aaron hit his 715th to break the all-time career home run record, formerly held by Babe Ruth. Bonds went four for five along with the home run as well as a double and four runs batted in. "Barry Bonds remember that name you'll be hearing a lot of it," the announcer said. Looking back on the play twenty years later, McMurtry said "It was a fastball, down and away. He took it the other way. I don't know how he hit it." In 1986, Bonds led National League (NL) rookies with 16 home runs, 48 RBI, 36 stolen bases, and 65 walks, but he finished sixth in NL Rookie of the Year Award voting. He played center field in 1986, but switched to left field with the arrival of centerfielder Andy Van Slyke in 1987.

==== 1987 season ====
The Pirates experienced a surge in fan enthusiasm with Bonds on the team and set the club attendance record of 52,119 in the 1987 home opener. In his early years, Bonds batted as the leadoff hitter. On May 30 at Three Rivers Stadium, against the Cincinnati Reds, after starting the season as the everyday center fielder, Bonds switched and started his first career game in left field. With Van Slyke also in the outfield, the Pirates had a venerable defensive tandem that worked together to cover a lot of ground on the field, although they were not close off of it. That year, Bonds hit .261 with 25 home runs, along with 32 stolen bases and 59 RBI in 150 games.

==== 1988 season ====
The Pirates broke the record set the previous year with 54,089 attending the home opener. Bonds improved in 1988, hitting .283 with 24 home runs and 58 RBI in 144 games.

==== 1989 season ====
Bonds now fit into a highly respected lineup featuring Bobby Bonilla, Van Slyke, and Jay Bell. He finished with 19 homers, 58 RBI, and 14 outfield assists in 1989, which was second in the NL. Following the season, there were rumors that he would be traded to the Dodgers for Jeff Hamilton and John Wetteland, but the team denied the rumors and no such trade occurred.

==== 1990 season ====
On July 12, 1990, at Three Rivers Stadium, in a 4–3 win over the San Diego Padres, Bonds hit a fly ball off of pitcher Andy Benes to deep right field for his 100th career Major League home run. Bonds won his first career Major League Baseball Most Valuable Player Award in 1990, hitting .301 with 33 home runs and 114 RBI in 151 games. He also stole 52 bases, which was third in the league, and joined the 30–30 and 20–50 clubs for the first time. He won his first Gold Glove Award and Silver Slugger Award. That year, the Pirates won the National League East title for their first postseason berth since winning the 1979 World Series. However, the Cincinnati Reds, whose last postseason berth had also been in 1979 when they lost to the Pirates in that year's NLCS, defeated the Pirates in the NLCS en route to winning the 1990 World Series.

==== 1991 season ====
In 1991, Bonds again put up great numbers, batting .292 with 25 homers and driving in 116 runs in 153 games, earning him another Gold Glove and Silver Slugger. He finished second to the Atlanta Braves' Terry Pendleton (the NL batting champion) in the NL MVP voting.

==== 1992 season ====
In March 1992, Pirates general manager Ted Simmons agreed to a deal with Atlanta Braves counterpart John Schuerholz to trade Bonds, in exchange for Alejandro Peña, Keith Mitchell, and a player to be named later. Pirates manager Jim Leyland opposed the trade vehemently, and the proposal was rescinded. Bonds stayed with Pittsburgh and won his second National League MVP Award in the last three seasons, making him the only Pittsburgh Pirate with multiple regular season MVPs. While hitting .311 with 34 homers and 103 RBI, he propelled the Pirates to their third straight National League East division title. However, Pittsburgh was defeated by the Braves in a seven-game National League Championship Series. Bonds participated in the final play of Game 7 of the NLCS, whereby he fielded a base hit by Francisco Cabrera and attempted to throw out Sid Bream at home plate. The throw to Pirates catcher Mike LaValliere was late and Bream scored the winning run.

For the third consecutive season, the NL East Champion Pirates were denied a trip to the World Series. Following the loss, Bonds and star teammate Doug Drabek were expected to command salaries too high for Pittsburgh to again sign them. Following Bonds' departure, the Pittsburgh Pirates missed the playoffs for 21 straight years from 1993 until 2013, when they reached the MLB postseason as a Wild Card team. In his seven-season Pittsburgh Pirates career, Bonds amassed a .275 batting average, 984 base hits, 176 home runs, and 556 runs batted in. Bonds was never well-liked by reporters or fans while in Pittsburgh, despite winning two NL MVP awards. One paper even gave him an "award" as the "MDP" (Most Despised Pirate).

=== San Francisco Giants (1993–2007) ===
Bonds in 2002

Bonds became an unrestricted free agent on October 26, 1992. During this time, he was contacted by multiple teams, including the Atlanta Braves, New York Yankees, and San Francisco Giants. On December 6, 1992, news broke that Bonds would leave the Pirates to sign a lucrative free agent contract worth a then-record $43.75 million (equivalent to $97.5 million in 2025) over six years with the Giants, with whom his father had spent the first seven years of his career, and with whom his godfather Willie Mays played 21 of his 22 Major League seasons. The deal was at that time the largest in baseball history, in terms of both total value and average annual salary.

Once he signed with the Giants, Bonds intended to wear the number 24, his number during most of his stay with the Pirates, but it was Willie Mays's old number, which the Giants had retired. After receiving Mays's blessing, the Giants were willing to unretire it until the public commotion from fans and media became too much. To honor his father, Bonds switched his jersey number to 25, as it had been Bobby's number in San Francisco. On December 8, 1992, the deal was finalized. In an emotional press conference announcing the signing, Bonds described joining the Giants as going "home" and following in the footsteps of his father and godfather as "unbelievable" and "...like a boyhood dream that comes true for me." His father joined the team as a coach in the same year.

==== 1993 season ====
On April 18, 1993, at Candlestick Park, in a 13–12 win over the Atlanta Braves, Bonds had four base hits and a stolen base, with his third double of the game in the bottom of the ninth inning being his 1,000th career Major League hit. On May 12, 1993, at Mile High Stadium, in a 8–2 win over the Colorado Rockies, both Bonds and his father, along with Rockies outfielder Jerald Clark and coach Ron Hassey, were ejected for their role in an on-field fight. On July 8, 1993, at Veterans Stadium, in a 13–2 win over the Philadelphia Phillies, Bonds had three base hits, two home runs, and six runs batted in. Leading 11–2 and leading off the top of the seventh inning, Bonds bolted a line drive on the first pitch he saw from pitcher José DeLeón, a low breaking ball, to deep right-center field and into the stands for his 200th career Major League home run, making the score 12–2.

Bonds hit .336 in 1993, leading the NL with 46 home runs and 123 RBI in 159 games en route to his second consecutive NL MVP Award, and third one overall in the last four seasons. Bonds and Bryce Harper are the only MLB players to win a regular season MVP with two different teams before the age of 30. "1993 was probably the most dominant team I've ever been on," Bonds said. The Giants won 103 games, a then-San Francisco Era record that would last until 2021, when that year's team broke the all-time single season franchise record for wins by one with 107. The Atlanta Braves won 104 in what some call the last great pennant race (because the wild card was instituted the year after). "One of us has to lose. Unfortunately it's always us, or me," Bonds said.

==== 1994 season ====
In the strike-shortened season of 1994, Bonds hit .312 with 37 home runs, 81 RBI and a league-leading 74 walks in 112 games. He finished fourth in NL MVP voting.

==== 1995 season ====
In 1995, Bonds played in 144 games, hitting .294 with 33 homers and 104 RBI, but finished only 12th in NL MVP voting. In 1994, he appeared in a small role as himself in the television film Jane's House, starring James Woods and Anne Archer.

==== 1996 season ====
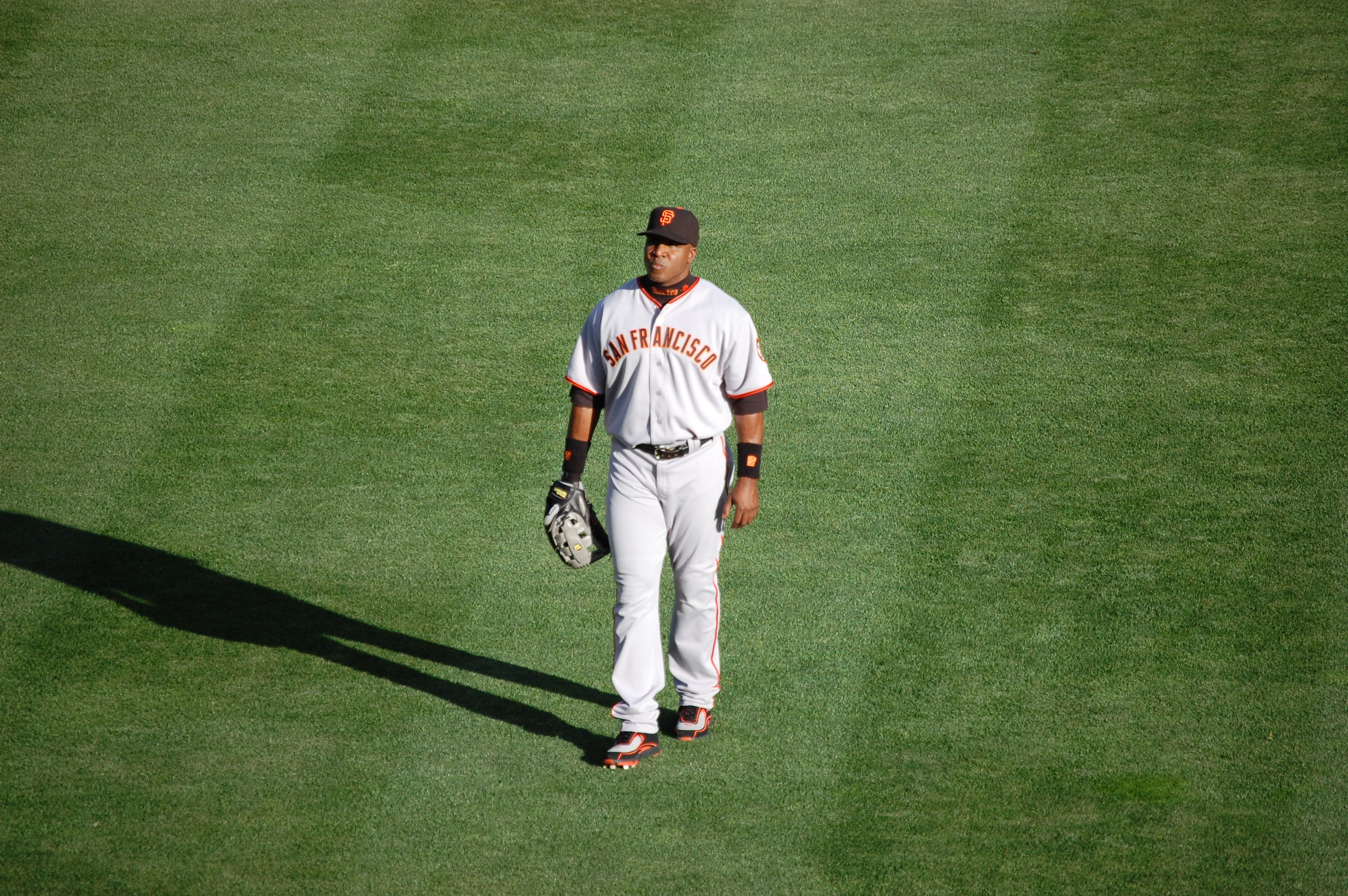
Bonds on the field

In 1996, Bonds became the first National League player and second Major League player (of the current list of six) to hit 40 home runs and steal 40 bases in the same season. The other members of the 40–40 club are José Canseco (1988), Alex Rodriguez (1998), Alfonso Soriano (2006), Ronald Acuña Jr. (2023), and Shohei Ohtani (2024). His father Bobby Bonds was one home run short in 1973 when he hit 39 home runs and stole 43 bases. Bonds hit his 300th and 301st career Major League home runs off former Giants teammate and Florida Marlins pitcher John Burkett on April 27. He became the fourth player in history to join the 300–300 club with 300 stolen bases and 300 home runs for a career, joining Willie Mays, Andre Dawson, and his father. Bonds's totals for the season included 129 runs driven in, a .308 average and a then-National League record 151 walks. He finished fifth in the NL MVP balloting.

==== 1997 season ====
In 1997, Bonds hit .291, his lowest average since 1989. He hit 40 home runs for the second straight year and drove in 101 runs, leading the league in walks again with 145. He also stole 37 bases, tying his father for having the most 30–30 seasons (five), and he again placed fifth in the NL MVP balloting.

==== 1998 season ====
On May 28, 1998, at 3Com Park, with two outs in the bottom of the ninth inning, Arizona Diamondbacks manager Buck Showalter decided to intentionally walk Bonds with the bases loaded. Nap Lajoie (1901), Del Bissonette (1928) and Bill Nicholson (1944) were three other players in the 20th century who received that rare honor. The first to receive one was Abner Dalrymple in 1881. The Diamondbacks, a 1998 Major League Baseball expansion team, were leading the Giants 8–5, when closing pitcher Gregg Olson began the inning by striking out leadoff hitter and starting center fielder Darryl Hamilton, the Giants responded by loading the bases with two walks and a hit before starting right fielder Stan Javier had an RBI grounder that made it 8–6. The Giants loaded the bases again after pinch-hitter J. T. Snow walked, and Showalter ordered Olson to intentionally walk Bonds, forcing home a run, and bringing up pinch hitting catcher Brent Mayne, who worked the count full before he lined to right field for the third out. Olson put together one of the strangest saves imaginable, working around six walks in 1 1/3 innings, throwing 49 pitches (not counting the bases-loaded intentional walk), and only 22 of them were for strikes.

On August 23, Bonds hit his 400th career Major League home run. By doing so, he became the first player ever to enter the 400–400 club by having career totals of 400 home runs and 400 stolen bases; he is still the only player to have achieved this feat. The milestone home run came off Kirt Ojala, who, like Burkett, was pitching for the Marlins. For the season, he hit .303 with 37 home runs and drove in 122 runs, winning his eighth Gold Glove. He finished eighth in the NL MVP voting.

==== 1999 season ====
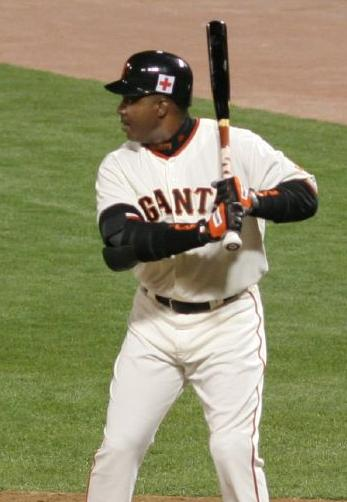
Bonds at the plate with the Giants

1999 marked a career-low, up to that point, for Bonds in terms of playing time. Bonds started off the 1999 season hitting well by batting .366 in the month of April with four home runs and 12 RBI in the Giants' first 12 games of the season. But on April 18, he was placed on the 15-day disabled list for only the second time in his career up to that point. Bonds had suffered a torn tendon in his biceps as well as bone spurs in his elbow, both of which required surgery and cost him the rest of April and all of May.

Upon returning to action on June 9, Bonds struggled somewhat at the plate for the remainder of the 1999 season. A series of nagging injuries including elbow pain, knee inflammation and groin issues hampered his play. On September 11, 1999, at 3Com Park, in a 3–2 win over the Atlanta Braves, leading off the top of the fourth inning, Bonds hit a fly ball double off of future National Baseball Hall of Fame pitcher Tom Glavine to deep left field for his 2,000th career Major League hit. Only hitting .248 after his return from the disabled list, he still managed to slug 34 home runs, drive in 83 runs as well as hit for a .617 slugging percentage, despite missing nearly two full months with injuries and only playing in 102 games. He finished 24th in the NL MVP voting.

Bill James ranked Bonds as the best player of the 1990s. He added that the decade's second-best player, Craig Biggio, had been closer in production to the decade's 10th-best player than to Bonds. In 1999, with statistics through 1997 being considered, Bonds ranked Number 34 on The Sporting News' list of the 100 Greatest Baseball Players, making him the highest-ranking active player. When the Sporting News list was redone in 2005, Bonds was ranked 6th behind Babe Ruth, Willie Mays, Ty Cobb, Walter Johnson, and Hank Aaron. Bonds was omitted from 1999's Major League Baseball All-Century Team, to which Ken Griffey Jr. was elected. James wrote of Bonds, "Certainly the most unappreciated superstar of my lifetime. ... Griffey has always been more popular, but Bonds has been a far, far greater player." In 1999, he rated Bonds as the 16th-best player of all time. "When people begin to take in all of his accomplishments," he predicted, "Bonds may well be rated among the five greatest players in the history of the game."

==== 2000 season ====
In 2000, Bonds hit .306 with career bests through that time in both slugging percentage (.688) and home runs (49) in just 143 games. He also drew a league-leading 117 walks. He finished second in the NL MVP voting behind future National Baseball Hall of Fame second baseman and teammate Jeff Kent.

==== 2001 season: Single-season home run record ====
The next year, Bonds's offensive production reached even higher levels, breaking not only his own personal records but several Major League records. In the Giants' first 50 games in 2001, he hit 28 home runs, including 17 in May—a career high. This early stretch included his 500th career Major League home run hit on April 17 against Terry Adams of the Los Angeles Dodgers. He became the 17th member and fourth Giant to reach the milestone. Following his 500th home run, his father Bobby suggested to him that he should start collecting every game-used bat in which he hit a home run, which he did. He also hit 39 home runs by the All-star break (a Major League record), drew a Major League record 177 walks, and had a .515 on-base average, a feat not seen since Mickey Mantle and Ted Williams over forty years earlier. Bonds' slugging percentage (.863) was the fifth-highest in MLB history, and the highest since Josh Gibson's .868 in 1943.

"Bonds hits it, deep to right field, way back! Is this the one?! There's a new record-holder! The single-season mark is 71! Barry Bonds has the title!"

— Gary Thorne's television call on ESPN of Bonds' 71st home run in 2001

"There’s a high drive, deep into right-center field, to the big part of the ballpark … NUMBER 71! And what a shot, over the 421-foot marker! The deepest part of any ballpark in the National League and Barry Bonds is now the home run king! Number 71 and it was impressive!"

— Jon Miller's television call on Fox Sports Bay Area of Bonds' 71st home run in 2001

On October 4, by homering off Wilfredo Rodríguez in the 159th game of the season, Bonds tied the previous record of 70 set by Mark McGwire—which McGwire set in the 162nd game in 1998. He then broke the record by hitting numbers 71 and 72 the following night off Chan Ho Park. Bonds added his 73rd off Dennis Springer on October 7. The ball was later sold to toy manufacturer Todd McFarlane for $450,000. He previously bought Mark McGwire's 70th home run ball from 1998. Bonds received the Babe Ruth Home Run Award for leading MLB in home runs that season. Bonds won the National League MVP in a landslide, becoming baseball's first four-time regular season MVP. He received 30 of 32 first-place votes, beating out Chicago Cubs right fielder Sammy Sosa and Arizona Diamondbacks left fielder Luis Gonzalez.

==== 2002 season ====
Bonds re-signed with the Giants for a five-year, $90 million contract on January 15, 2002. He hit five home runs in the Giants' first four games of the season, tying Lou Brock's 35-year record for most home runs after four games. He won the NL batting title with a career-high .370 average, and also recorded 46 home runs, 110 RBI, and just 47 strikeouts in 403 at-bats.

Despite playing in nine fewer games than the previous season, he drew 198 walks, a Major League record; 68 of them were intentional walks, surpassing Willie McCovey's 45 in 1969 for another Major League record. He slugged .799, then the fourth-highest total all time. Bonds broke Ted Williams' Major League record for on-base average with .582. He posted a 268 OPS+, which was, somehow, higher than his record-breaking 2001 season of 259. Bonds also hit his 600th career Major League home run, less than a year and a half after hitting his 500th. The home run came on August 9 at home against his former team, the Pittsburgh Pirates, and pitcher Kip Wells.

==== 2002 postseason ====
Bonds batted .322 with eight home runs, 16 RBI, and 27 walks in the postseason en route to the 2002 World Series, which the Giants lost in seven games to the Anaheim Angels. In the World Series, Bonds batted .471 with eight hits, two doubles, four home runs, six runs batted in, and scored eight runs. He was also walked 13 times (seven intentionally).

==== 2003 season ====
In 2003, Bonds played in just 130 games. He hit 45 home runs in just 390 at-bats, along with a .341 batting average. He slugged .749, walked 148 times, and had an on-base average well over .500 (.529) for the third straight year. He also became the only member of the career 500 home run/500 stolen base club by stealing second base on June 23 off pitcher Éric Gagné in the 11th inning of a tied ball game against the Los Angeles Dodgers (against whom Bonds had tallied his 500th home run). Bonds scored the game-winning run later that inning.

==== 2004 season ====
On April 13 at SBC Park, in a 4–2 win over the Milwaukee Brewers, Bonds hit his 661st career Major League home run, surpassing Mays on the all-time list and putting him alone in third place behind Aaron and Ruth. Leading 3–1 in the bottom of the seventh inning, he flew a hanging breaking ball off of pitcher Ben Ford to deep right field and into McCovey Cove for a solo "Splash Hit" home run, making the score 4–1. On July 4 at SBC Park, ironically against the Oakland Athletics, he tied and passed Rickey Henderson's all-time MLB record for the most career bases on balls with his 2,190th and 2,191st career walks. Henderson played 25 MLB seasons. Leading off the bottom of the sixth inning and working a 3-2 count, Bonds tied the record by walking against starting pitcher Mark Mulder. In the bottom of the eighth inning, Bonds walked against submarine-style pitcher Chad Bradford, breaking the previous record and moving starting center fielder Marquis Grissom to second base. On September 17 at SBC Park, in a 4–1 win over the San Diego Padres, he hit his 700th career Major League home run. Leading 3–0 and leading off the bottom of the third inning, he hit a fly ball well off of starting pitcher and future 2014 World Series champion Giant Jake Peavy, who led MLB with a 2.27 earned run average that season, to left-center field over the head of left fielder and future teammate Ryan Klesko and the wall for an opposite field solo home run, making the score 4–0. He became the third player at the Major League level to reach the milestone.

2004 is perhaps Bonds' best season. Bonds is the first and only player in MLB history to reach base more times than the number of at bats in a single season, reaching base 376 times in 373 at bats. He hit .362 en route to his second National League batting title, and broke his own record by walking 232 times (including an MLB record 120 intentional walks). He slugged .812, the tenth-highest of all time, and broke his on-base percentage record with a .609 average. Bonds hit 45 home runs and only struck out just 41 times, putting himself in elite company, as few major leaguers have ever had more home runs than strikeouts in a season. This was the last season that a Giant hit at least 30 home runs in a season, as the team would go on to set an MLB record for the most consecutive seasons without hitting that mark from 2005 to 2024 at 20 seasons. Out of all 30 teams, this was the longest such drought for any team by 12 seasons, until newly signed shortstop Willy Adames ended the streak on the last day of the 2025 season. Bonds would win his fourth consecutive MVP award and his seventh overall. Shohei Ohtani is the only other player to win at least four regular season MVP awards. In addition, no other player from either league has been awarded the MVP four times in a row. (The MVP award was first given in 1931). The 40-year-old Bonds also broke Willie Stargell's 25-year record as the oldest player to win a Most Valuable Player Award (Stargell, at 39 years, 8 months, was National League co-MVP with Keith Hernandez in 1979).

As Bonds neared Aaron's record, Aaron was called on for his opinion of Bonds. He clarified that he was a fan and admirer of Bonds and avoided the controversy regarding whether the record should be denoted with an asterisk for Bonds's alleged steroid usage. He felt recognition and respect for the award was something to be determined by the fans. As the steroid controversy received greater media attention during the offseason before the 2005 season, Aaron expressed some reservations about the statements Bonds made on the issue. Aaron expressed that he felt drug and steroid use to boost athletic performance was inappropriate. Aaron was frustrated that the media could not focus on events that occurred in the field of play and wished drugs or gambling allegations such as those associated with Pete Rose could be emphasized less. In 2007, Aaron felt the whole steroid use issue was very controversial and decided that he would not attend any possible record-breaking games. Aaron congratulated Bonds through the media including a video played on the scoreboard when Bonds eventually broke Aaron's record in August 2007.

==== 2005 season ====
Bonds's salary for the 2005 season was $22 million, the second-highest salary in Major League Baseball (the Yankees' Alex Rodriguez earned the highest, $25.2 million). Bonds endured a knee injury, multiple surgeries, and rehabilitation. He was activated on September 12 and started in left field. In his return against the San Diego Padres, he nearly hit a home run in his first at-bat. Bonds finished the night 1-for-4. Upon his return, Bonds resumed his high-caliber performance at the plate, hitting home runs in four consecutive games from September 18 to 21. He finished with a .286 average, five homers and 10 RBI in only 14 games.

==== 2006 season ====
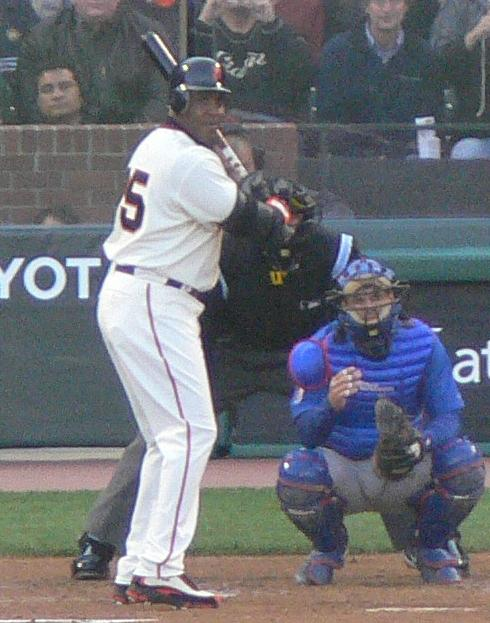
Bonds batting against the Chicago Cubs in 2006

In 2006, Bonds earned $20 million (not including bonuses), the fourth-highest salary in baseball. Through the 2006 season he had earned approximately $172 million during his then 21-year career, making him baseball's all-time highest-paid player. Bonds hit under .200 for his first 10 games of the season and did not hit a home run until April 22. This 10-game stretch was his longest home run slump since the 1998 season. On May 7, Bonds drew within one home run of tying Babe Ruth for second place on the all-time list, hitting his 713th career home run into the second level of Citizens Bank Park in Philadelphia, off pitcher Jon Lieber in a game in which the Giants lost to the Philadelphia Phillies. The towering home run—one of the longest in Citizens Bank Park's two-season history, traveling an estimated 450 feet (140 m)—hit off the facade of the third deck in right field.

On May 20, Bonds hit his 714th career home run to deep right field to lead off the top of the second inning, tying Ruth for second all-time. The home run came off left-handed pitcher Brad Halsey of the Oakland Athletics, in an interleague game played in Oakland, California. Since this was an interleague game at an American League stadium, Bonds was batting as the designated hitter in the lineup for the Giants. Bonds was quoted after the game as being "glad it's over with" and stated that more attention could be focused on Albert Pujols, who was on a very rapid home run pace in early 2006.

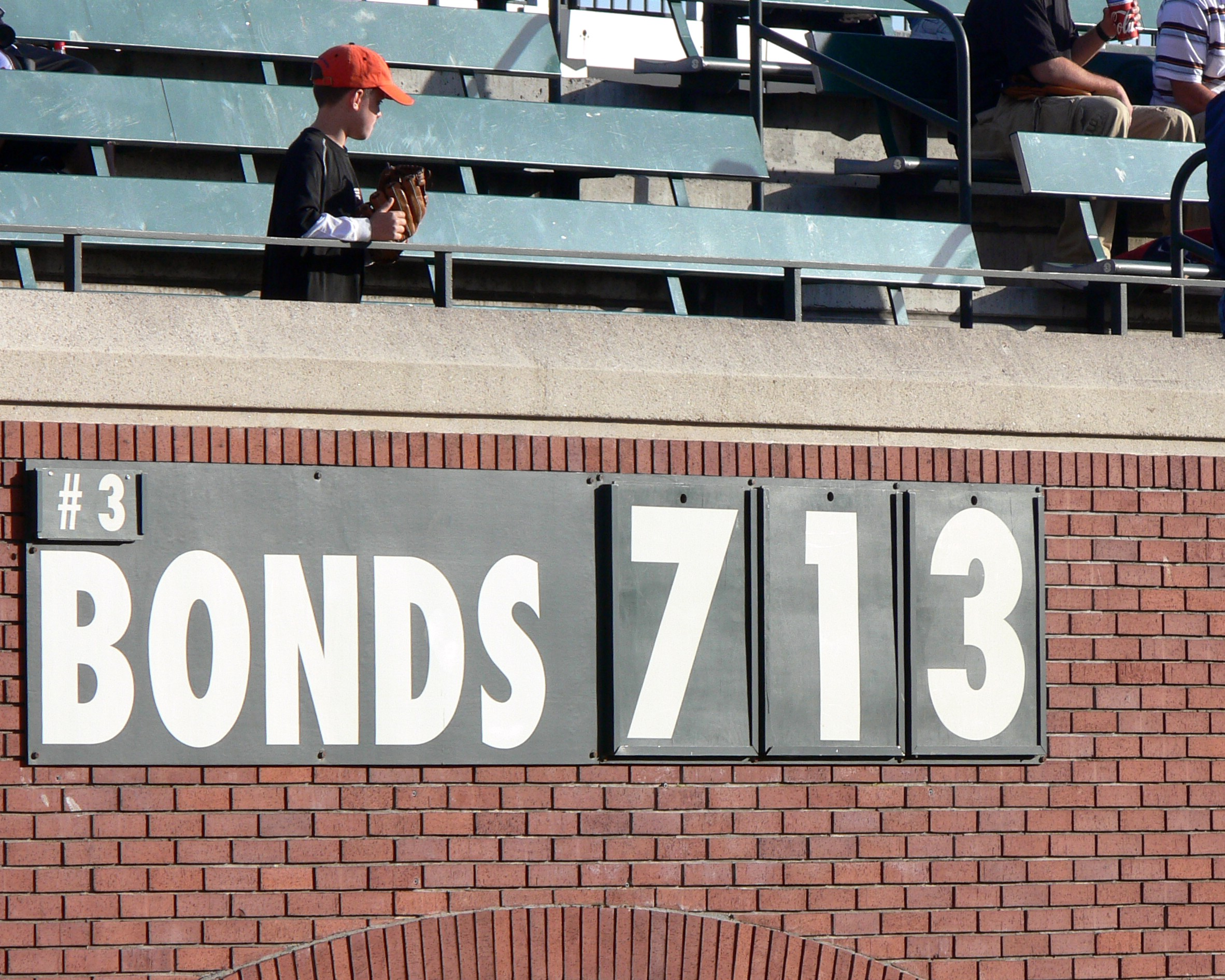
A sign counts up to Barry Bonds's 714th home run

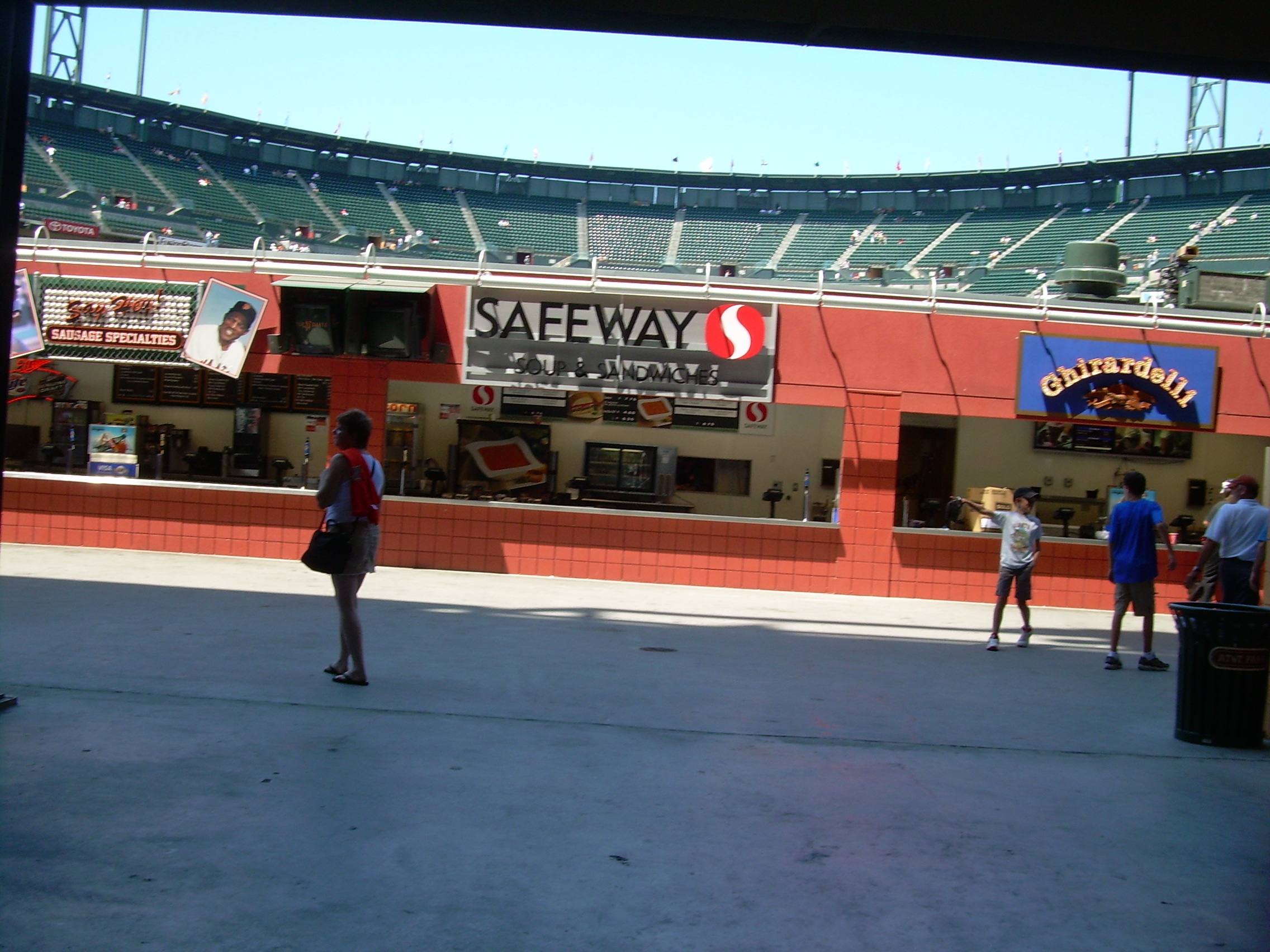
Concession stand where home run number 715 was hit in center field

On May 28, Bonds passed Ruth, hitting his 715th career home run to center field off Colorado Rockies pitcher Byung-hyun Kim. The ball was hit an estimated 445 feet (140 m) into center field where it went through the hands of several fans but then fell onto an elevated platform in center field. Then it rolled off the platform where Andrew Morbitzer, a 38-year-old San Francisco resident, caught the ball while he was in line at a concession stand. Mysteriously, radio broadcaster Dave Flemming's radio play-by-play of the home run went silent just as the ball was hit, apparently from a microphone failure. But the televised version, called by Giants broadcaster Duane Kuiper, was not affected.

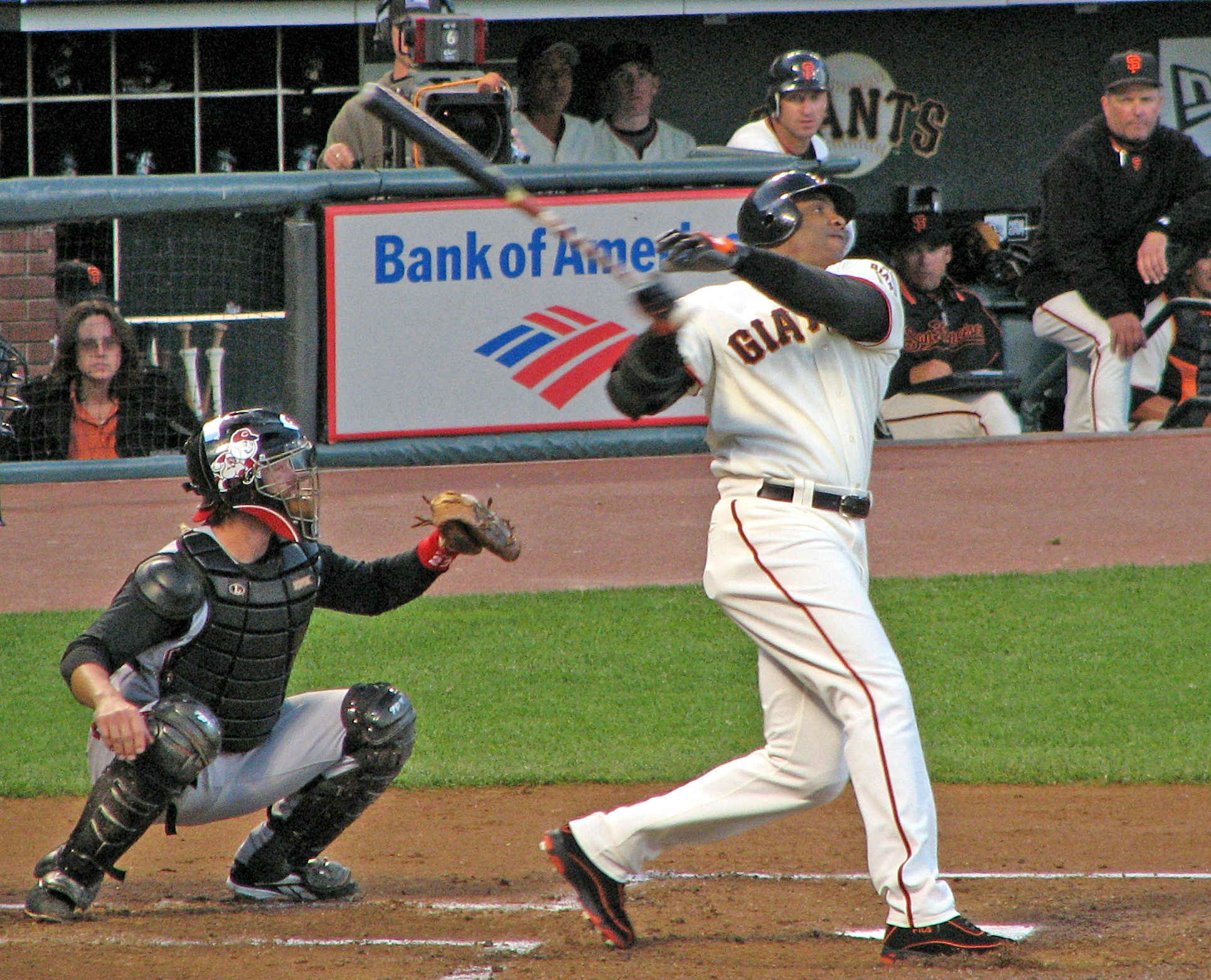
Bonds in August 2006 with the Giants

On September 22, Bonds tied Henry Aaron's National League career home run record of 733. The home run came in the top of the sixth inning of a high-scoring game against the Milwaukee Brewers, at Miller Park in Milwaukee, Wisconsin. The achievement was notable for its occurrence in the very city where Aaron began (with the Milwaukee Braves) and concluded (with the Brewers, then in the American League) his career. With the Giants trailing 10–8, Bonds hit a blast to deep center field on a 2–0 pitch off the Brewers' Chris Spurling with runners on first and second and one out. Though the Giants were at the time clinging to only a slim chance of making the playoffs, Bonds' home run provided the additional drama of giving the Giants an 11–10 lead late in a critical game in the final days of a pennant race. The Brewers eventually won the game, 13–12, though Bonds went 3-for-5, with two doubles, the record-tying home run, and six runs batted in.

On September 23, Bonds surpassed Aaron for the NL career home run record. Hit in Milwaukee like the previous one, this was a solo home run off Chris Capuano of the Brewers. This was the last home run Bonds hit in 2006. In 2006, Bonds recorded his lowest slugging percentage (a statistic that he had historically ranked among league leaders season after season) since 1991 with the Pittsburgh Pirates. In January 2007, the New York Daily News reported that Bonds had tested positive for amphetamines. Under baseball's amphetamine policy, which had been in effect for one season, players testing positive were to submit to six additional tests and undergo treatment and counseling. The policy also stated that players were not to be identified for a first positive test, but the New York Daily News leaked the test's results. When the Players Association informed Bonds of the test results, he initially attributed it to a substance he had taken from the locker of Giants teammate Mark Sweeney, but would later retract this claim and publicly apologize to Sweeney.

==== 2007 season: Home run record ====
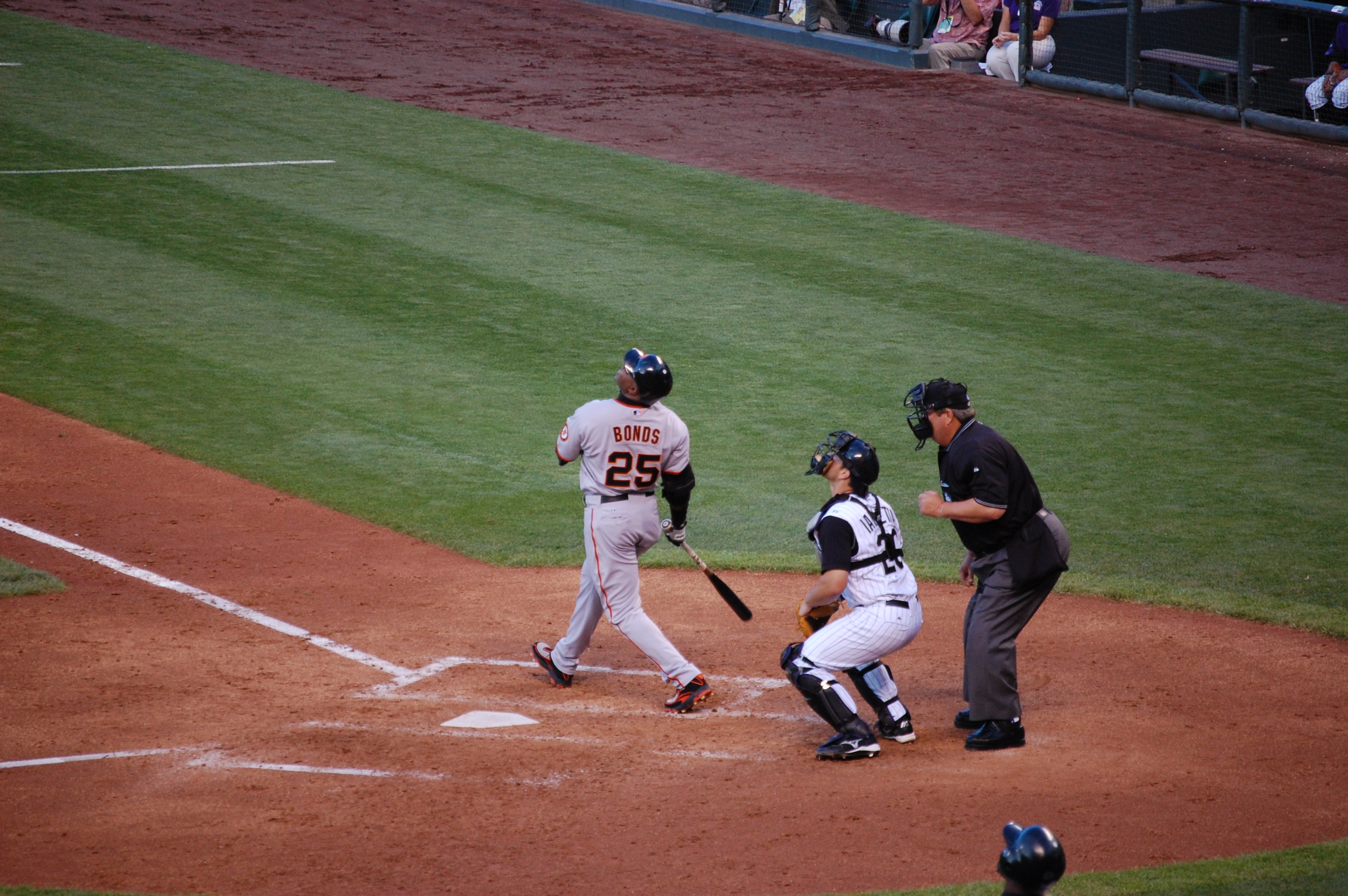
Bonds at the plate against the Rockies in 2007. Bonds would hit his final career Major League home run at Coors Field later that season.

On January 29, 2007, the Giants finalized a contract with Bonds for the 2007 season. After the commissioner's office rejected Bonds's one-year, $15.8 million deal because it contained a personal-appearance provision, the team sent revised documents to his agent, Jeff Borris, who stated that "At this time, Barry is not signing the new documents." Bonds signed a revised one-year, $15.8 million contract on February 15 and reported to the Giants' Spring training camp on time.

Bonds resumed his march to the all-time record early in the 2007 season. In the season opener on April 3, all he had was a first-inning single past third base with the infield shifted right, immediately followed by a stolen base and then thrown out at home on a baserunning mistake, followed by a deep fly-out to left field, late in the game. Bonds regrouped the next day with his first at-bat in the second game of the season at the Giants' AT&T Park. Bonds hit a pitch from Chris Young of the San Diego Padres just over the wall to the left of straight-away center field for career home run 735. This home run put Bonds past the midway point between Ruth and Aaron. Bonds did not homer again until April 13, when he hit two (736 and 737) in a three for three night that included four runs batted in against the Pittsburgh Pirates. Bonds splashed a pitch by St. Louis Cardinals pitcher Ryan Franklin into McCovey Cove on April 18 for home run 738. Home runs number 739 and 740 came in back to back games on April 21 and 22 against the Arizona Diamondbacks.

The hype surrounding Bonds's pursuit of the home run record escalated on May 14. On this day, Sports Auction for Heritage (a Dallas-based auction house) offered US$1 million to the fan who would catch Bonds's record-breaking 756th-career home run. The million-dollar offer was rescinded on June 11 out of concern of fan safety. Home run 748 came on Father's Day, June 17, in the final game of a three-game road series against the eventual World Series Champion Boston Red Sox at Fenway Park, where Bonds had never previously played. With this homer, Fenway Park became the 36th Major League ballpark in which Bonds had hit a home run. He hit a Tim Wakefield knuckleball just over the low fence into the Giants' bullpen in right field. It was his first home run off his former Pittsburgh Pirate teammate, who became the 441st different pitcher to surrender a four-bagger to Bonds. The 750th career home run, hit on June 29, also came off a former teammate: Liván Hernández. The blast came in the eighth inning and at that point tied the game at 3–3.

On July 19, after a 21 at-bat hitless streak, Bonds hit two home runs, numbers 752 and 753, against the Chicago Cubs. He went three for three with two home runs, six runs batted in, and a walk on that day. The struggling last-place Giants still lost the game, 9–8. On July 27, Bonds hit home run 754 against Florida Marlins pitcher Rick VandenHurk. Bonds was then walked his next four at-bats in the game, but a two-run shot helped the Giants win the game 12–10. It marked the first time since he had hit #747 that Bonds had homered in a game the Giants won. On August 4, Bonds hit a 382 foot (116 m) home run against former Giants draftee, San Diego Padres starting pitcher, and future San Francisco Giant Clay Hensley for home run number 755, tying Hank Aaron's all-time record. Bonds greeted his son, Nikolai, with an extended bear hug after crossing home plate. Bonds greeted his teammates and then his wife, Liz Watson, and daughter Aisha Lynn behind the backstop. Hensley was the 445th different pitcher to give up a home run to Bonds. Ironically, given the cloud of suspicion that surrounded Bonds, the tying home run was hit off a pitcher who had been suspended by baseball in 2005 for steroid use. He was walked in his next at-bat and eventually scored on a fielder's choice.

"Bacsik's 3-2 again. There's a swing and a high fly ball, right-center field. Back it goes. Racing back, Logan jumping up, and that ball is gone! No. 756. Barry Bonds stands alone. And on the night of August 7, 2007, in San Francisco, California, Barry Lamar Bonds has hit more home runs than any major leaguer in the history of baseball."

— Dave O'Brien's television call on ESPN2 of Bonds' record-breaking 756th career Major League home run

"Three balls and two strikes ... and Bacsik deals. And Bonds hits one high ... HITS IT DEEP! IT IS ... OUTTA HERE! 756! Bonds stands alone! He is on top, of the all-time home run list. What a special moment for Barry Bonds. And what a special moment, for these fans here in San Francisco. There it is."

— Duane Kuiper's television call on FSN Bay Area of Bonds' record-breaking 756th career Major League home run

"Three and two to Bonds. Everybody standing here at 24 Willie Mays Plaza. An armada of nautical craft gathered in McCovey Cove beyond the right field wall. Bonds one home run away from history. (crack of the bat) and he swings, and there's a long one into right center field, way back there, it's gone! A home run! Into the center field bleachers to the left of the 421 foot marker. An extraordinary shot to the deepest part of the yard! And Barry Bonds with 756 home runs, he has hit more home runs than anyone who has ever played the game!"

— Jon Miller's radio call on KNBR of Bonds' record-breaking 756th career Major League home run

On August 7 at 8:51 PM PDT, at Oracle Park (then known as AT&T Park) in San Francisco, Bonds hit a 435 foot (133 m) solo home run, his 756th, off a pitch from Washington Nationals starting pitcher Mike Bacsik, breaking the all-time career home run record, formerly held by Hank Aaron. Coincidentally, Bacsik's father had faced Aaron (as a pitcher for the Texas Rangers) after Aaron had hit his 755th home run. On August 23, 1976, Michael J. Bacsik held Aaron to a single and a fly out to right field. The younger Bacsik commented later, "If my dad had been gracious enough to let Hank Aaron hit a home run, we both would have given up 756." After hitting the home run, Bonds gave Bacsik an autographed bat.

With the score tied 4–4 and leading off the bottom of the fifth inning, right fielder Randy Winn hit a flyball to deep left field that was caught by Ryan Church, who was playing in front of the orange BONDS shield with the logo that read "ROAD TO HISTORY". As Bonds walked from the on deck circle to the plate and entered the batter's box, the entire ballpark stood up at the same time. With one out, the pitch, the seventh of the at-bat, was a 3–2 pitch which Bonds hit into the right-center field bleachers. This put the Giants ahead 5–4. The fan who ended up with the ball, 22-year-old Matt Murphy from Queens, New York City, and a Mets fan, was promptly protected and escorted away from the mayhem by a group of San Francisco police officers. Fireworks went off and Bonds was hugged by his son Nikolai, the Giants bat boy, as he touched home plate, pointing towards the sky. After Bonds finished his home run trot, he was embraced by his teammates, coaches, and family, as a ten-minute delay followed, including a brief video by Aaron congratulating Bonds on breaking the record Aaron had held for 33 years, and expressing the hope that "the achievement of this record will inspire others to chase their own dreams."

Bonds made an impromptu emotional statement on the field, with Willie Mays, his godfather, at his side and thanked the fans, his teammates, family, the Washington Nationals, and his late father "for everything." In the top of the sixth inning and with no outs, Bonds took left field and was substituted with Dave Roberts on a double switch by manager Bruce Bochy. Bonds finished the game three for three and was a triple shy of hitting for the cycle, something that he had never done in the Major Leagues. The Giants lost the game 8–6. Bonds spoke to members of the media after the game. When asked if the record is tainted, Bonds, speaking postgame at the podium and dodging one steroid question, said "This record is not tainted at all, at all, Period."

The Commissioner of Baseball Bud Selig was not in attendance in this game but was represented by the Executive Vice President of Baseball Operations, Jimmie Lee Solomon. Selig called Bonds later that night to congratulate him on breaking the record. President George W. Bush also called Bonds the next day to congratulate him. On August 24, San Francisco honored and celebrated Bonds' career accomplishments and breaking the home run record with a large rally in Justin Herman Plaza. The rally included video messages from Lou Brock, Ernie Banks, Ozzie Smith, Joe Montana, Wayne Gretzky and Michael Jordan. Speeches were made by Willie Mays, Giants teammates Omar Vizquel and Rich Aurilia, and Giants owner Peter Magowan. Mayor Gavin Newsom presented Bonds the key to the City and County of San Francisco and Giants vice president Larry Baer gave Bonds the home plate he touched after hitting his 756th career home run.

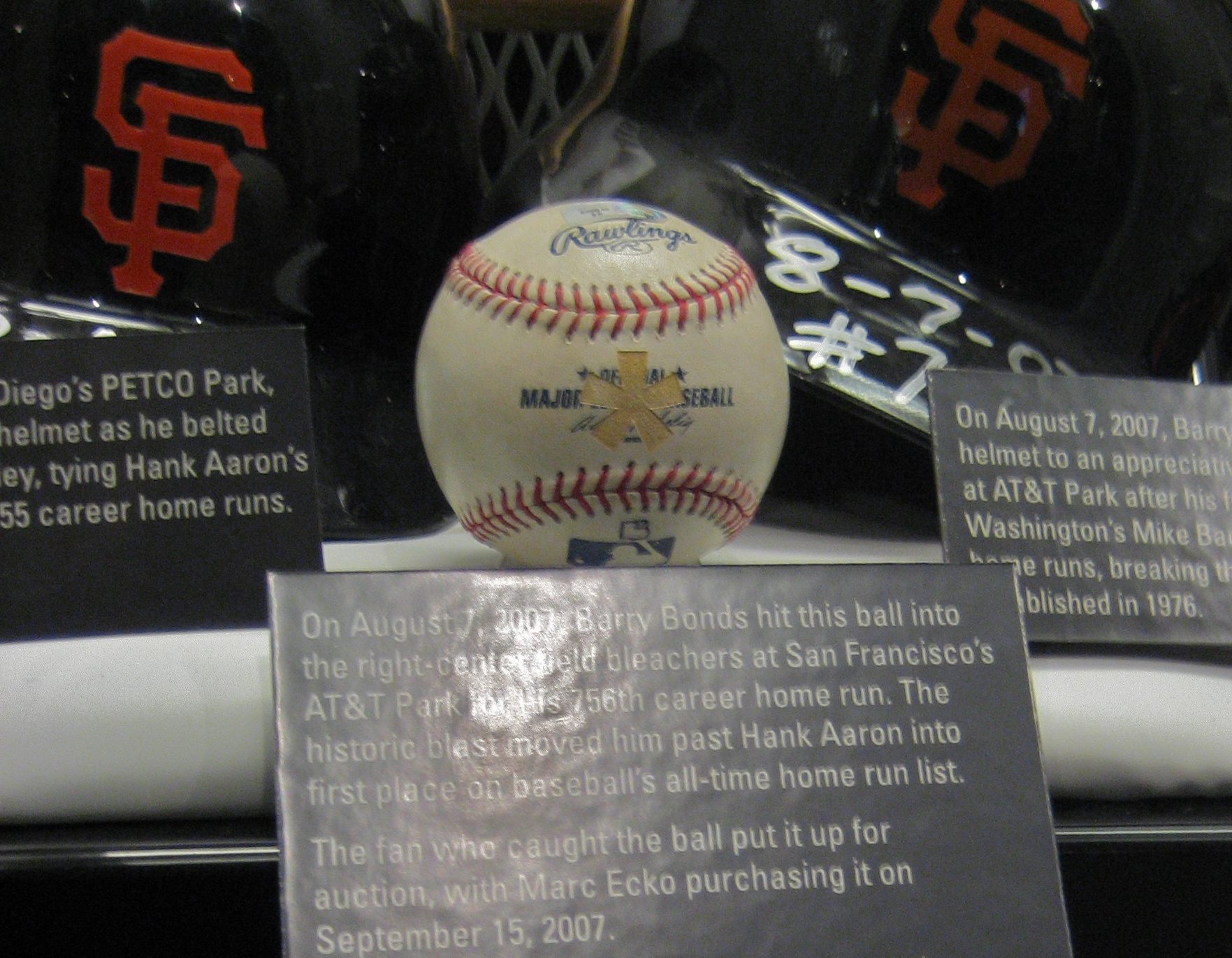
Bonds's 756th home run ball in the Hall of Fame

The record-setting ball was consigned to an auction house on August 21. Bidding began on August 28 and closed with a winning bid of US$752,467 on September 15 after a three-phase online auction. The high bidder, fashion designer Marc Ecko, created a website to let fans decide its fate. Subsequently, Ben Padnos, who submitted the $186,750 winning bid on Bonds' record-tying 755th home run ball also set up a website to let fans decide its fate. On September 26, 2007, the day that Bonds would play in his last career Major League game, 10 million voters helped Ecko decide to brand the ball with an asterisk and send it to the National Baseball Hall of Fame and Museum. Of Ecko's plans, Bonds said "He spent $750,000 on the ball and that's what he's doing with it? What he's doing is stupid." Padnos, on the other hand, sold five-year ads on a website, www.endthedebate.com, where people voted by a two-to-one margin to smash the ball.

On September 15, 2007, at Petco Park, leading off the top of the second inning, Bonds hit a line drive single off of starting pitcher and former teammate Brett Tomko to short center field for his 2,935th and final career hit in the Major Leagues. "Tomko got the pitch out over the plate and Bonds hit it about five feet over Tomko's head," commented Giants sportscaster Duane Kuiper. On September 21, 2007, at AT&T Park, General Manager Brian Sabean and team CEO, Managing general partner, owner, and President Peter Magowan announced at a press conference that the Giants would not be re-signing Bonds for the 2008 season. The story was first announced on Bonds' own website earlier that day. On September 26, 2007, at AT&T Park, after missing the previous 10 games, Bonds played in his 2,986th career game and made his last MLB appearance. In his last career Major League game, Bonds had no hits in three at bats against San Diego Padres starting pitcher and that season's 2007 NL Pitching Triple Crown and NL Cy Young Award winner Jake Peavy, who had allowed Bonds' 700th career Major League home run three years earlier.

Bonds concluded the 2007 season with a .276 batting average, 28 home runs, and 66 RBI in 126 games and 340 at-bats. At the age of 43, he led the Majors in three categories with 132 walks, a .480 on-base percentage, and 43 intentional walks. He is the only player in their final season to lead the Majors in each of these categories separately. In his 15-season San Francisco Giants career, Bonds amassed a .312 batting average, 1,951 base hits, and the San Francisco Era records for home runs and runs batted in with 586 and 1,440 respectively.

== Career overall ==
=== Statistics and achievements ===
Legend
**Bold**	All-time leader

Category	Years	WAR	G	AB	R	H	2B	3B	HR	TB	XBH	RBI	SB	BB	AVG	OBP	SLG	OPS	IBB	FLG%	Ref.
Total	22	162.8	2,986	9,847	2,227	2,935	601	77	**762**	5,976	1,440	1,996	514	**2,558**	.298	.444	.607	1.051	**688**	.984	

== Post-playing career ==
On October 29, 2007, Bonds officially filed for free agency. His agent Jeff Borris said: "I'm anticipating widespread interest from every Major League team." There was much speculation before the 2008 season about where Bonds might play. However, no one signed him during the 2008 or 2009 seasons. The 2008 Giants finished in fourth place in the NL West with a 72–90 win–loss record and the 2009 Giants finished in third place in the division with an 88–74 record. Many teams could have used his services. If he had returned to MLB, Bonds would have been within close range of many significant career batting milestones and records. He needed only just 14 games played and 65 hits to reach 3,000, 394 plate appearances to reach 13,000, 153 at bats to reach 10,000, 38 home runs to reach 800, four runs batted in to reach 2,000, 24 total bases to reach 6,000, 60 extra base hits to reach 1,500, and 12 intentional walks to reach 700. On August 7, 2017, which marked the 10-year anniversary of Bonds hitting his record-breaking 756th career Major League home run, Bonds told The Associated Press that he wished to have played one more year and that he believes he would have reached 800 or come very close. He would have needed 69 runs scored to move past Rickey Henderson as the all-time MLB career runs scored leader, 38 extra base hits to move past Hank Aaron as the all-time MLB career extra base hits leader, and 107 home runs to move past Sadaharu Oh as the world record holder for professional career home runs hit during the regular season.

As of November 13, 2009, Borris maintained that Bonds was still not retired. On December 9, however, Borris told the San Francisco Chronicle that Bonds had played his last Major League game. Bonds announced on April 11, 2010, that he was proud of McGwire for admitting his use of steroids. Bonds said that it was not the time to retire, but he noted that he was not in shape to play immediately if an interested club called him. The Giants won the World Series two times in three years in 2010 and 2012. In May 2015, Bonds filed a grievance against Major League Baseball through the players' union arguing that the league colluded in not signing him after the 2007 season. In August 2015, an arbitrator ruled in favor of MLB and against Bonds in his collusion case.

On December 15, 2011, Bonds was sentenced to 30 days of house arrest, two years of probation and 250 hours of community service, for an obstruction of justice conviction stemming from a grand jury appearance in 2003. However, U.S. District Judge Susan Illston then delayed the sentence pending an appeal. In 2013 his conviction was upheld on appeal by a three judge panel of the United States Court of Appeals for the Ninth Circuit. However, the full court later granted Bonds an en banc rehearing, and on April 22, 2015, an 11-judge panel of the Ninth Circuit voted 10–1 that his testimony was not obstruction.

On February 22, 2014, news broke that Bonds would be a roving spring training instructor for the Giants, which he began serving on March 10, 2014, for seven days at Scottsdale Stadium. The Giants won the 2014 World Series and he received a World Series ring for his contributions. On February 8, 2015, Bonds was elected to the Bay Area Sports Hall of Fame and he was enshrined on May 11, 2015. On March 21, 2017, Bonds rejoined the Giants as a Special Advisor to the CEO. On July 8, 2017, Bonds was added onto the San Francisco Giants Wall of Fame. On February 6, 2018, the Giants announced their intentions to retire his number 25 jersey, which happened on August 11, 2018, during a pregame ceremony at 5:57 PM PDT before the Giants played his former team, the Pittsburgh Pirates. On November 28, 2019, Bonds was inducted into the California Sports Hall of Fame.

On August 25, 2019, Bonds was featured in Alex Rodriguez' YouTube video called "LAUNCH ANGLES feat. BARRY BONDS". Bonds says that he could have hit .400 if he had bunted. Batting .400 or higher is something that no MLB player has done since Ted Williams in 1941. In his career when bunting for base hits, Bonds batted .571, going 8–14, according to Baseball Reference. On August 24, 2024, Bonds was inducted into the Pittsburgh Pirates Hall of Fame. His number 24 with the Pirates remains in circulation, most prominently worn by Brian Giles from 1999 to 2003 and by Pedro Alvarez from 2011 to 2015.

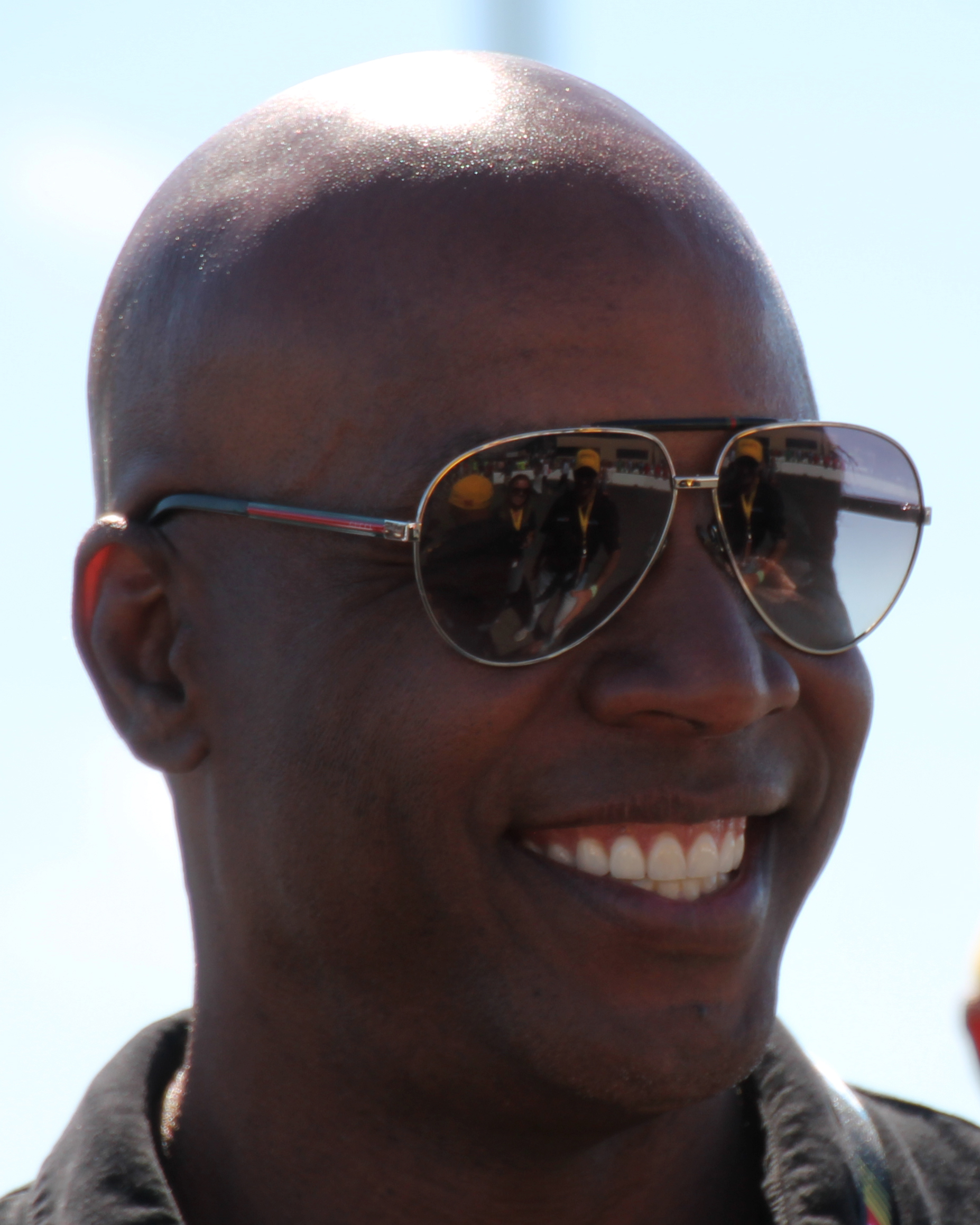
Bonds in 2015

On February 5, 2025, at San Francisco City Hall, Mayor Daniel Lurie officially proclaimed 2/5/25 as "Barry Bonds Day", honoring his contributions to baseball and the city, and it was a way to celebrate him on the "once-in-a-century date". On March 6, 2025, Bonds appeared as a guest on the digital video podcast All the Smoke with Matt Barnes and Stephen Jackson and he said that he can still hit a 100 mile per hour pitch. Since Bonds' last season in 2007, the Giants have started a different left fielder on every Opening Day, tying the Major League record for the longest streak by any team at any position since at least 1900. On June 25, 2025, Giants CEO Larry Baer hinted that planning a future statue of Bonds outside of Oracle Park is on the radar and coming during an interview on 95.7 The Game.

In March 2026, it was announced that Bonds would be joining Netflix's MLB broadcast team, helping with coverage for three events of the upcoming season.

=== National Baseball Hall of Fame consideration ===
In his 10 years of eligibility for the National Baseball Hall of Fame, Bonds fell short of the 75% of the votes from the Baseball Writers' Association of America (BBWAA) needed for induction. His vote percentages from 2013 through 2022 were: 36.2%, 34.7%, 36.8%, 44.3%, 53.8%, 56.4%, 59.1%, 60.7%, 61.8% and 66%. He appeared on 260 of 394 ballots in his last year. Despite falling off the ballot, Bonds remained eligible through the Hall of Fame's Today's Game Committee, a committee of 16 members of the National Baseball Hall of Fame, executives, and media members, hence the nickname of "Veterans Committee", who consider retired players who lost ballot eligibility while still having made notable contributions to baseball from 1986 to 2016. The vote was held in December 2022; twelve of the sixteen votes were required for induction, but Bonds received fewer than four.

== Coaching career ==
=== Miami Marlins (2016) ===
On December 4, 2015, he was announced as the new hitting coach for the Miami Marlins, but was relieved of his duties on October 3, 2016, after just one season. He followed up with a public thank-you letter, acknowledging owner Jeffrey Loria, and the opportunity as "one of the most rewarding experiences of my baseball career."

== Public persona ==
During his playing career, Bonds was frequently described as a difficult person, surly, standoffish and ungrateful. In a 2016 interview with Terence Moore, he said he regretted the persona he had created. He attributed it to a response to the pressure he felt to perform as a young player with the Pirates. Remarked Bonds,

Hell, I kick myself now, because I'm getting great press [since being more cooperative], and I could have had a trillion more endorsements, but that wasn't my driving force. The problem was, when I tried to give in a little bit, it never got better. I knew I was in the midst of that image, and I determined at that point that I was never going to get out of it.

So I just said, 'I've created this fire around me, and I'm stuck in it, so I might as well live with the flames.'

Bonds reports that for a short time during his playing days with the Giants he changed his demeanor at the behest of a group of teammates, smiling much more frequently and engaging more with others with a pleasant attitude. Shortly thereafter, Bonds says, in the midst of a slump, the same group of teammates pleaded that he revert, having seemingly lost his competitive edge, and causing the team to lose more. In spite of his protest that they would not appreciate the results, his teammates insisted. Bonds says he complied, maintaining that familiar standoffish edge the rest of his playing career.

On May 9, 1996, Bonds shoved USA Today journalist Rod Beaton in the team's clubhouse. As Beaton was waiting to interview Robby Thompson one hour before a game against the St. Louis Cardinals, Bonds told Beaton to leave. The reporter replied that Major League Baseball rules allowed him 15 minutes more to talk with players. Bonds waved a finger in Beaton's face and shoved him in the chest, after which members of the team's coaching staff and front office interceded. Bonds and Beaton spoke again after the game. Beaton later said, "He accused me of having an attitude" and "I told him he went over the line by shoving me, but there was no apology." Bonds felt that the incident was overblown and said that, "We don't have a problem. We like each other. It was a big joke. He just got whacked out." Beaton filed no formal complaint about the incident, but USA Today filed a grievance with the team.

== Controversies ==
=== BALCO scandal ===
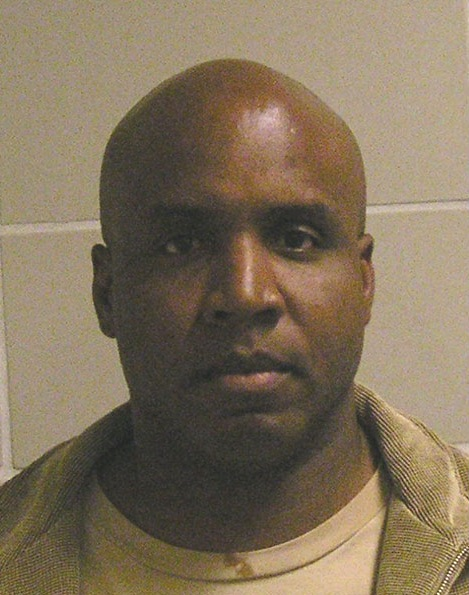
Mug shot taken after 2007 indictment

Since 2003, Bonds has been a key figure in the Bay Area Laboratory Co-operative (BALCO) scandal. BALCO marketed tetrahydrogestrinone ("the Clear"), a performance-enhancing anabolic steroid that was undetectable by doping tests. He was under investigation by a federal grand jury regarding his testimony in the BALCO case, and was indicted on perjury and obstruction of justice charges on November 15, 2007. The indictment alleges that Bonds lied while under oath about his alleged use of steroids.

In 2003, BALCO's Greg Anderson, Bonds's trainer since 2000, was indicted by a federal grand jury in the United States District Court for the Northern District of California and charged with supplying anabolic steroids to athletes, including a number of baseball players. This led to speculation that Bonds had used performance-enhancing drugs during a time when there was no mandatory testing in Major League Baseball. Bonds declared his innocence, attributing his changed physique and increased power to a strict regimen of bodybuilding, diet, and legitimate supplements.

During grand jury testimony on December 4, 2003, Bonds said that he used a clear substance and a cream that he received from his personal strength trainer, Greg Anderson, who told him they were the nutritional supplement flaxseed oil and a rubbing balm for arthritis. Later reports on Bonds's leaked grand-jury testimony contend that he admitted to unknowingly using "the cream" and "the clear".

On February 22, 2005, during a press conference about the scandal, Bonds addressed the assembled reporters. "All you guys lied," Bonds said. "All of y'all in a story or whatever have lied. Should you have an asterisk behind your name? All of you lied. All of you have said something wrong. All of you have dirt. All of you. When your closet's clean, then come clean somebody else's. But clean yours first, okay?" In July 2005, all four defendants in the BALCO steroid scandal trial, including Anderson, struck deals with federal prosecutors that did not require them to reveal names of athletes who might have used banned drugs.

==== Perjury case ====
On November 15, 2007, a federal grand jury indicted Bonds on four counts of perjury and one count of obstruction of justice as it relates to the government investigation of BALCO. He was tried in the U.S. District Court for the Northern District of California. On February 14, 2008, a typo in court papers filed by Federal prosecutors erroneously alleged that Bonds tested positive for steroids in November 2001, a month after hitting his record 73rd home run. The reference was meant instead to refer to a November 2000 test that had already been disclosed and previously reported. The typo sparked a brief media frenzy. His trial for obstruction of justice was to have begun on March 2, 2009, but jury selection was postponed by emergency appeals by the prosecution. The trial commenced on March 21, 2011, with Judge Susan Illston presiding. He was convicted on April 13, 2011, on the obstruction of justice charge, for giving an evasive answer to a question under oath. On December 15, 2011, Bonds was found guilty for an obstruction of justice conviction stemming from a grand jury appearance in 2003. However, U.S. District Judge Susan Illston then delayed the sentence pending his appeal. He was sentenced to 30 days of house arrest. He also received two years of probation and was ordered to perform 250 hours of community service. Bonds appealed his conviction to the U.S. Court of Appeals for the Ninth Circuit. In 2013, a three-judge panel of the Ninth Circuit affirmed his conviction, but in 2015 his appeal was reheard by the full court en banc, which voted 10–1 to overturn his conviction.

=== Players' union licensing withdrawal ===
Jon Dowd, the most well-known generic replacement for Bonds in MVP Baseball 2005

In 2003, Bonds withdrew from the MLB Players Association (MLBPA) licensing agreement because he felt independent marketing deals would be more lucrative for him. Bonds is the first player in the 30-year history of the licensing program not to sign. Because of this withdrawal, his name and likeness are not usable in any merchandise licensed by the MLBPA. In order to use his name or likeness, a company must deal directly with Bonds. For this reason, he does not appear in some baseball video games, forcing game-makers to create generic athletes as replacements. These generic video games replacements tended to be white and sometimes had different handedness which was done likely to avoid potential player likeness lawsuits from Bonds.

=== Game of Shadows ===
In March 2006 the book Game of Shadows, written by Lance Williams and Mark Fainaru-Wada, was released amid a storm of media publicity including the cover of Sports Illustrated. Initially small excerpts of the book were released by the authors in the issue of Sports Illustrated. The book alleges Bonds used stanozolol and a host of other steroids, and is perhaps most responsible for the change in public opinion regarding Bonds's steroid use. The book contained excerpts of grand jury testimony that is supposed to be sealed and confidential by law. The authors have been steadfast in their refusal to divulge their sources and at one point faced jail time. On February 14, 2007, Troy Ellerman, one of Victor Conte's lawyers, pleaded guilty to leaking grand jury testimony. Through the plea agreement, he would spend two and a half years in jail.

=== Love Me, Hate Me ===
In May 2006, former Sports Illustrated writer Jeff Pearlman released a revealing biography of Bonds entitled Love Me, Hate Me: Barry Bonds and the Making of an Anti-Hero. The book also contained many allegations against Bonds. The book, which describes Bonds as a polarizing, insufferable braggart with a legendary ego and staggering talent, relied on over five hundred interviews, none with Bonds himself.

=== Bonds on Bonds ===
In April 2006 and May 2006, ESPN aired a few episodes of a 10-part reality TV (unscripted, documentary-style) series starring Bonds. The show, titled Bonds on Bonds, focused on Bonds's chase of Babe Ruth's and Hank Aaron's home run records. Some felt the show should be put on hiatus until baseball investigated Bonds's steroid use allegations. The series was canceled in June 2006, ESPN and producer Tollin/Robbins Productions citing "creative control" issues with Bonds and his representatives.

== Personal life ==
Several of Bonds' family and extended family members have been involved in athletics as either a career or a notable pastime. Bonds has a younger brother, Bobby Jr., who was also a professional baseball player. His paternal aunt, Rosie Bonds, is a former American record holder in the 80 meter hurdles, and competed in the 1964 Summer Olympics. In addition, he is a distant cousin of National Baseball Hall of Fame right fielder Reggie Jackson.

Bonds met Susann ("Sun") Margreth Branco, the mother of his first two children (Nikolai and Shikari), in Montreal, Quebec, in August 1987. They eloped to Las Vegas February 5, 1988. The couple separated in June 1994, divorced in December 1994, and had their marriage annulled in 1997 by the Catholic Church. The divorce was a media affair because Bonds had his Swedish spouse sign a prenuptial agreement in which she "waived her right to a share of his present and future earnings" and which was upheld. Bonds had been providing his wife $20,000/month in child support and $10,000 in spousal support at the time of the ruling. During the hearings to set permanent support levels, allegations of abuse came from both parties. The trial dragged on for months, but Bonds was awarded both houses and reduced support. On August 21, 2000, the Supreme Court of California, in an opinion signed by Chief Justice Ronald M. George, unanimously held that "substantial evidence supports the determination of the trial court that the [prenuptial] agreement in the present case was entered into voluntarily." In reaction to the decision, significant changes in California law relating to the validity and enforceability of premarital agreements soon followed. In 2010, Bonds's son Nikolai, who served as a Giants batboy during his father's years playing in San Francisco and always sat next to his dad in the dugout during games, was charged with five misdemeanors resulting from a confrontation with his mother, Sun Bonds, who was granted a restraining order against Nikolai.

In 1994, Bonds and Kimberly Bell, a graphic designer, started a relationship, which lasted through May 2003. Bonds purchased a home in Scottsdale, Arizona, for Kimberly. On January 10, 1998, Bonds married his second wife, Liz Watson, at the San Francisco Ritz-Carlton Hotel in front of 240 guests. The couple lived in Los Altos Hills, California, with their daughter Aisha during their ten-and-a-half years of marriage before Watson filed for legal separation on June 9, 2009, citing irreconcilable differences. On July 21, 2009, just six weeks later, Watson announced that she was withdrawing her Legal Separation action. The couple were reconciled for seven months before Watson formally filed for divorce in Los Angeles on February 26, 2010. On June 6, 2011, Bonds and Watson filed a legal agreement not to take the divorce to trial and instead settle it in an "uncontested manner," agreeing to end the marriage privately at an unspecified later date without further court involvement.

In 2002, Bonds purchased a 17,100-square-foot mansion in the exclusive gated community of Beverly Park in Beverly Hills, California for $8.7 million. In 2014, Bonds sold it for $22 million. In 2007, Bonds purchased a Mediterranean-style mansion in Hillsborough, California, and in 2018 sold it for $6 million. An avid cyclist, Bonds chose the activity to be a primary means of keeping in shape and great passion since his playing career. Because knee surgeries, back surgeries, and hip surgeries made it much more difficult to run, cycling has allowed him to engage in sufficient cardiovascular activity to help keep in shape. As a result of the cycling, he has lost 25 pounds from his final playing weight of 240 pounds. Bonds is a member of the Olympic Club. Bonds is an active practitioner of Brazilian jiu-jitsu and was promoted to blue belt in the martial art in 2023.

Barry's nephew, Peyton, played college baseball for the Rutgers Scarlet Knights and was drafted by the Giants in 2026.

=== Philanthropy ===
Bonds' foundation is the Barry Bonds Family Foundation. Since 1993, it has helped uplift youth through education, sports, and support for children in hospitals.

== Legacy ==
Recorded between 2005 and 2007, American rapper, songwriter, and record producer Kanye West released his third studio album Graduation on September 11, 2007. The seventh track, a song titled "Barry Bonds", is named after the slugger and features Lil Wayne.

Barry Bonds

And here's another hit, Barry Bonds
We outta here, baby!
We outta here, baby!
We outta here, baby!

— Kanye West (featuring Lil Wayne), Graduation (September 11, 2007)

== Career distinctions ==
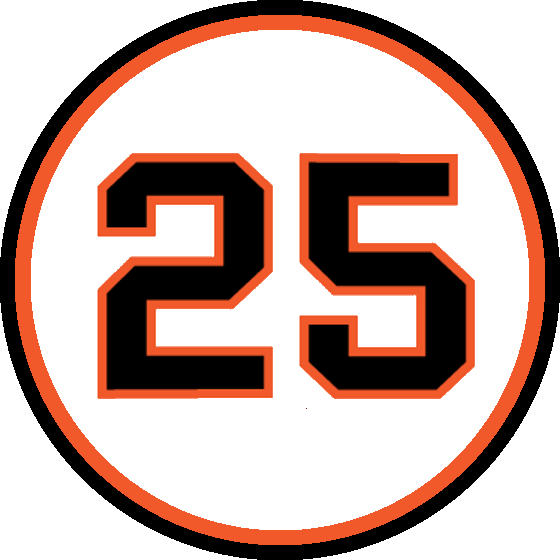
Barry Bonds's number 25 was retired by the San Francisco Giants in 2018.

Besides holding Major League career records in home runs (762), walks (2,558), and intentional walks (688), at the time of his retirement, Bonds also led all active players in RBI (1,996), on-base percentage (.444), runs (2,227), games (2,986), extra-base hits (1,440), at-bats per home run (12.92), and total bases (5,976). He is 2nd in doubles (601), slugging percentage (.607), stolen bases (514), at-bats (9,847), and hits (2,935), 6th in triples (77), 8th in sacrifice flies (91), and 9th in strikeouts (1,539), through September 26, 2007.

Bonds is the lone member of the 500–500 club, which means he has hit at least 500 home runs (762) and stolen at least 500 bases (514); no other player has even 400 of both. He is also one of only six baseball players all-time to be in the 40–40 club (1996), which means he hit 40 home runs (42) and stole 40 bases (40) in the same season; the other members are José Canseco, Alex Rodriguez, Alfonso Soriano, Ronald Acuña Jr, and Shohei Ohtani.

=== Records held ===
- Home runs in a single season (73), 2001
- Home runs in a career (762)
- Home runs in a career on the road (383)
- Home runs after turning 40 years old (74)
- Home runs in the year he turned 43 years old (28)
- Consecutive seasons with 30 or more home runs (13), 1992–2004
- Slugging percentage in a World Series (1.294), 2002
- Consecutive seasons with .600 slugging percentage or higher (8), 1998–2005
- On-base percentage in a single season (.609), 2004
- Walks in a career (2,558)
- Walks in a single season (232), 2004
- Consecutive games with a walk (18)
- Intentional walks in a career (688)
- Intentional walks in a single season (120), 2004
- Consecutive games with an intentional walk (6)
- MVP awards (7)
- Consecutive MVP awards (4), 2001–2004
- National League Player of the Month selections (13)
- Oldest player to win the National League batting title for the first time, batting .370 at age 38 in 2002
- Putouts as a left fielder (5,226)
- Career games with at least one home run and one stolen base (102)

=== Records shared ===
- Home runs in a career hit at home (379 - tied with Hank Aaron)
- Consecutive plate appearances with a walk (7)
- Consecutive plate appearances reaching base, National League modern era (15)
- Tied with his father, Bobby, for most seasons with 30 home runs and 30 stolen bases (5); they are the only father-son members of the 30–30 club

=== Other accomplishments ===
National League statistical leader
Category	Times	Seasons
Adjusted OPS+ leader	9	1990−1993, 2000−2004
Bases on balls leader	12	1992, 1994−1997, 2000−2004, 2006, 2007
Batting champion	2	2002, 2004
Extra base hits leader	3	1992, 1993, 2001
Games played leader	1	1995
Home run leader	2	1993, 2001
Intentional base on balls leader	12	1992−1998, 2002−2004, 2006, 2007
On-base percentage leader	10	1991−1993, 1995, 2001−2004, 2006, 2007
On-base plus slugging leader	9	1990−1993, 1995, 2001−2004
Runs batted in leader	1	1993
Runs scored leader	1	1992
Slugging percentage leader	7	1990, 1992, 1993, 2001−2004
Total bases leader	1	1993

Awards and distinctions

Awards received
Award	# of Times	Dates	Refs
AP Athlete of the Year	1	2001	
Babe Ruth Home Run Award	1	2001	
Baseball America All-Star	7	1993, 1998, 2000–2004	
Baseball America Major League Player of the Year	3	2001, 2003, 2004	
MLB All-Star	14	1990, 1992–1998, 2000–2004, 2007	
Major League Player of the Year	3	1990, 2001, 2004	
Rawlings Gold Glove Award at outfield	8	1990–1994, 1996–1998	
Silver Slugger Award at outfield	12	1990–1994, 1996–97, 2000–2004	

- Five-time SF Giants Player of the Year (1998, 2001–2004)
- Three-time NL Hank Aaron Award winner (2001–02, 2004)
- Listed at #6 on The Sporting News' list of the 100 Greatest Baseball Players, the highest-ranked active player, in 2005.
- Named a finalist to the Major League Baseball All-Century Team in 1999, but not elected to the team in the fan balloting.
- Rating of 340 on Bill James' Hall of Fame monitor (100 is a good HOF candidate); 10th among all hitters, second-highest among hitters not yet in the Hall of Fame.
- The fourth player to have two or more seasons with a slugging percentage over .800 (.863 in 2001 and .812 in 2004). The others are Babe Ruth (.847 in 1920 and .846 in 1921), Mule Suttles (.877 in 1926 and .817 in 1930), and Josh Gibson (.974 in 1937, .8675 in 1943, and .8235 in 1939).
- Became the first player in history with more times on base (376) than official at-bats (373) in 2004. This was due to the record number of walks, which count as a time on base and as a plate appearance, but not an at-bat. He had 135 hits, 232 walks, and 9 hit-by-pitches for the 376 number.
- Tenth all-time in plate appearances with 12,606. He is the only player in the top 10 of this category to not obtain 3,000 hits and just one of two players with as many as 12,000 plate appearances to not do so (the other being Omar Vizquel).
- With his father Bobby (332, 461), leads all father-son combinations in combined home runs (1,094) and stolen bases (975), respectively through September 26, 2007.
- Played minor league baseball in both Alaska and Hawaii. In 1983, he played for the Alaska Goldpanners of Fairbanks in the Alaska Baseball League, and in 1986, he played for the Hawaii Islanders in the Pacific Coast League.
- Featured on the cover of Sports Illustrated. He has appeared as the main subject on the cover eight times in total; seven with the Giants and once with the Pirates. He has also appeared in an inset on the cover twice. He was the most recent Pirate player to appear on the cover, until Jason Grilli was featured on July 22, 2013.

== See also ==
- List of Major League Baseball career at bat leaders
- List of Major League Baseball career bases on balls leaders
- List of Major League Baseball career doubles leaders
- List of Major League Baseball career extra base hits leaders
- List of Major League Baseball career games played leaders
- List of Major League Baseball career hits leaders
- List of Major League Baseball career hit by pitch leaders
- List of Major League Baseball career home run leaders
- List of Major League Baseball career on-base percentage leaders
- List of Major League Baseball career OPS leaders
- List of Major League Baseball career plate appearance leaders
- List of Major League Baseball career records
- List of Major League Baseball career runs batted in leaders
- List of Major League Baseball career runs scored leaders
- List of Major League Baseball career slugging percentage leaders
- List of Major League Baseball career stolen bases leaders
- List of Major League Baseball career strikeouts by batters leaders
- List of Major League Baseball career total bases leaders
- List of Major League Baseball doubles records
- List of Major League Baseball home run records
- List of Major League Baseball individual streaks
- List of Major League Baseball progressive career home runs leaders
- List of Major League Baseball progressive single-season home run leaders
- List of Major League Baseball record breakers by season
- List of Major League Baseball runs batted in records
- List of Major League Baseball runs records
- List of Major League Baseball single-season records
- List of milestone home runs by Barry Bonds
- List of second-generation Major League Baseball players
- List of Major League Baseball players named in the Mitchell Report
- Major League Baseball titles leaders
- Popov v. Hayashi – California court case involving scope of ownership

Achievements
Preceded by Kevin Mitchell; Will Clark; Todd Helton	National League Slugging Percentage Champion; 1990; 1992–1993; 2001–2004	Succeeded by Will Clark; Jeff Bagwell; Derrek Lee
Awards
Preceded by Ryne Sandberg; Barry Larkin; Howard Johnson; Gary Sheffield; Dante Bichette; Mike Piazza; Luis Gonzalez; Sammy Sosa; Larry Walker; Albert Pujols; Jim Thome; Jim Edmonds	National League Player of the Month; July 1990; July 1991; April 1992; September 1992 & April 1993; April 1996; July 1997; May 2001; September 2001; August 2002; July 2003; April 2004; August 2004	Succeeded by David Justice; Will Clark; Félix José; Jeff Bagwell; Jeff Bagwell; Mike Piazza; Luis Gonzalez; Vladimir Guerrero; Brian Jordan; Vladimir Guerrero; Lance Berkman; Adrián Beltré
Records
Preceded by Mark McGwire	Single season home run record holder 2001 – present	Current holder
Preceded by Rickey Henderson	Major League Baseball career bases on balls record holder 2004 – present	Current holder
Preceded by Hank Aaron	Career home run record holder 2007 – present	Current holder
