= List of Major League Baseball record breakers by season =

The following is a list of records for a game, season, or career that were broken in each Major League Baseball season by players, teams, or others. This does not include dates when additional stats were recorded by the same player above one's own record set (unless broken by someone else in between) or records by a team that do not lead the majors. Some of the records were subsequently broken by others:

== 1897 ==
- July 12: Most inside-the-park home runs in a game – 3 by Tom McCreery

== 1919 ==
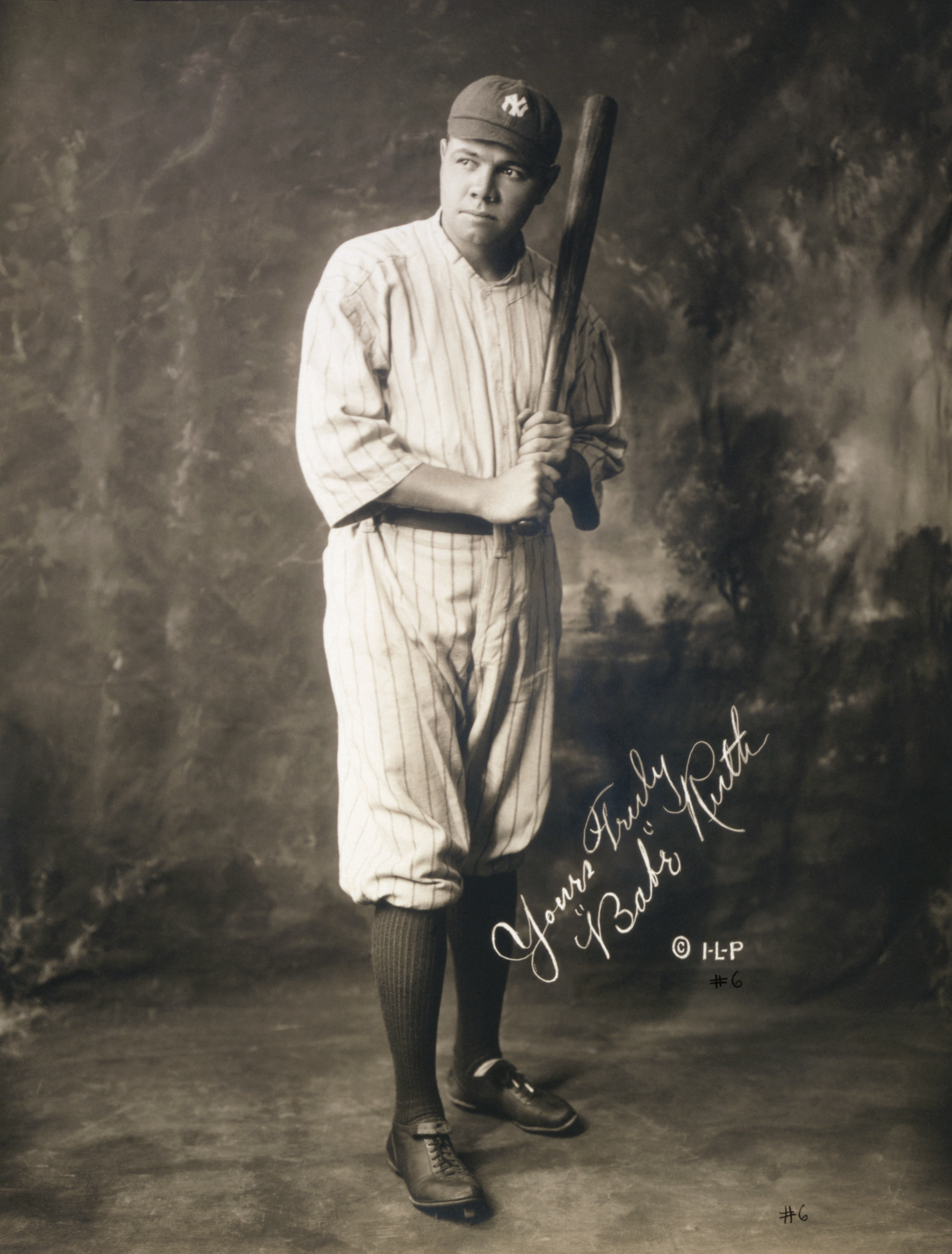
Babe Ruth

- Most home runs, season – 29 by Babe Ruth.

== 1920 ==
- July 19: Most home runs, season – 30 by Babe Ruth; ended the season with 54.
- Highest slugging percentage, season – .847 by Ruth.

== 1921 ==
- July 18: Most career home runs – 139 by Babe Ruth; ended his career in 1935 with 714.
  - Ruth's passing of Roger Connor for the career home-run record was not recognized at the time. Connor's career total of 138 was not accurately documented until the 1970s; at one time, he was thought to have hit only 131.
- September 15: Most home runs, season – 55 by Ruth; ended the season with 59.

== 1927 ==
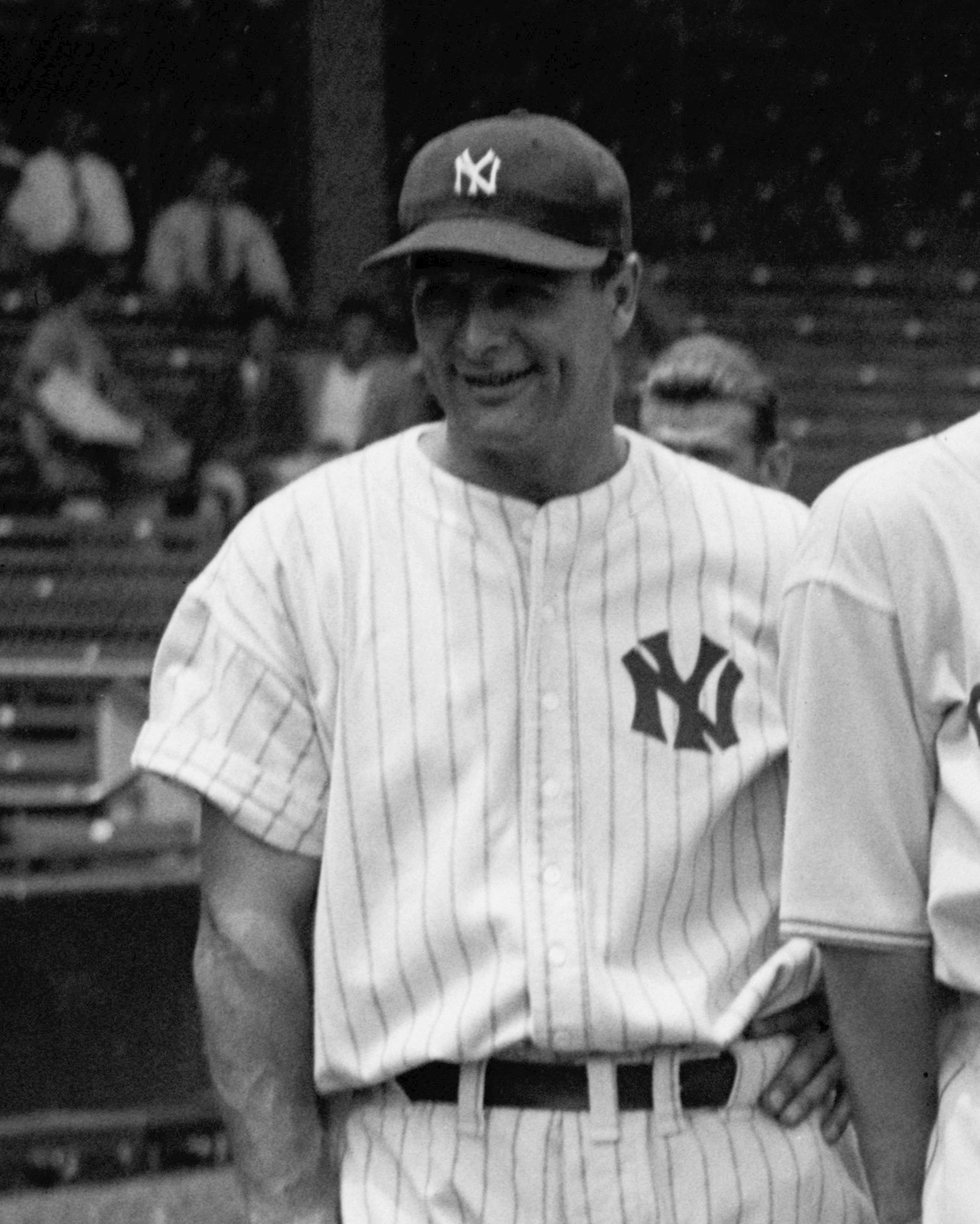
Lou Gehrig

- September 27: Most RBI, season – 172 by Lou Gehrig; ended season with 175.
- September 30: Most home runs, season – 60 by Babe Ruth.

== 1930 ==
- September 17: Most RBI, season – 176 by Hack Wilson; ended season with 191.

== 1932 ==
- July 10: Most hits in a game by a batter – 9 by Johnny Burnett

== 1941 ==
- July 2: Longest hitting streak in a single season – 45 by Joe DiMaggio; extended to 56.
- July 5: Longest hitting streak spanning one or more seasons – 46 by Joe DiMaggio; extended to 56.

== 1961 ==
- October 1: Most home runs, season – 61 by Roger Maris

== 1974 ==
- April 8: Most career home runs – 715 by Hank Aaron; ended his career in 1976 with 755.

== 1985 ==
- September 8: Most career hits – 4,190 by Pete Rose; ended his career in 1986 with 4,256.

== 1987 ==
- August 14: Most home runs by a rookie, season – 39 by Mark McGwire; later extended to 49.

== 1991 ==
- May 1: Most career stolen bases – 939 by Rickey Henderson; ended his career in 2003 with 1,406.

== 1995 ==
- September 6: Most consecutive games played – 2,131 by Cal Ripken Jr.; later extended to 2,632 in 1998.

== 1997 ==
- September 4

9: Most teams with which a player has hit 20 home runs in a season – 2 by Mark McGwire

== 1998 ==
- June 25: Most home runs in a calendar month – 19 by Sammy Sosa (extended to 20 on June 30).
- September 8: Most home runs, season – 62 by Mark McGwire; later extended to 70. Sosa also broke the 37-year-old record held by Roger Maris and was briefly the sole record-holder, hitting his 66th home run of the season (which would be his final total) before McGwire did.

== 1999 ==
- April 23: Most grand slams hit in one inning – 2 by Fernando Tatís
- Most grand slams surrendered in one inning – 2 by Chan Ho Park

== 2001 ==
- October 4: Most career runs – 2,246 by Rickey Henderson; ended his career in 2003 with 2,295
- October 5: Most home runs, season – 71 by Barry Bonds (hit #72 in same game; finished season with 73)
- Highest slugging percentage, season – .863 by Bonds.

== 2002 ==
- April 30: Most franchises against which a pitcher has earned a win: 30 by Al Leiter
- Highest on-base percentage, season – .582 by Barry Bonds.

== 2003 ==
- September 17: Most extra-base hits, season, by a team – 608 by Boston Red Sox

== 2004 ==
- July 10: Most intentional walks, season – 68 by Barry Bonds; broke his own record; finished season with 120
- October 6: Most hits in one season – 262 by Ichiro Suzuki
- Highest on-base percentage, season – .609 by Bonds.

== 2005 ==
- June 8: Youngest player to reach 400 home run mark – Alex Rodriguez, age 29 years, 316 days

== 2006 ==
- April 28: Most consecutive games with a home run by a right-handed hitter – 7 by Kevin Mench
- April 29: Most home runs in the month of April – 14 by Albert Pujols

== 2007 ==
- August 4: Youngest player to reach 500 career home runs – Alex Rodriguez, age 32 years, 8 days
- August 7: Most home runs, career – 756 by Barry Bonds; later extended to 762

== 2008 ==
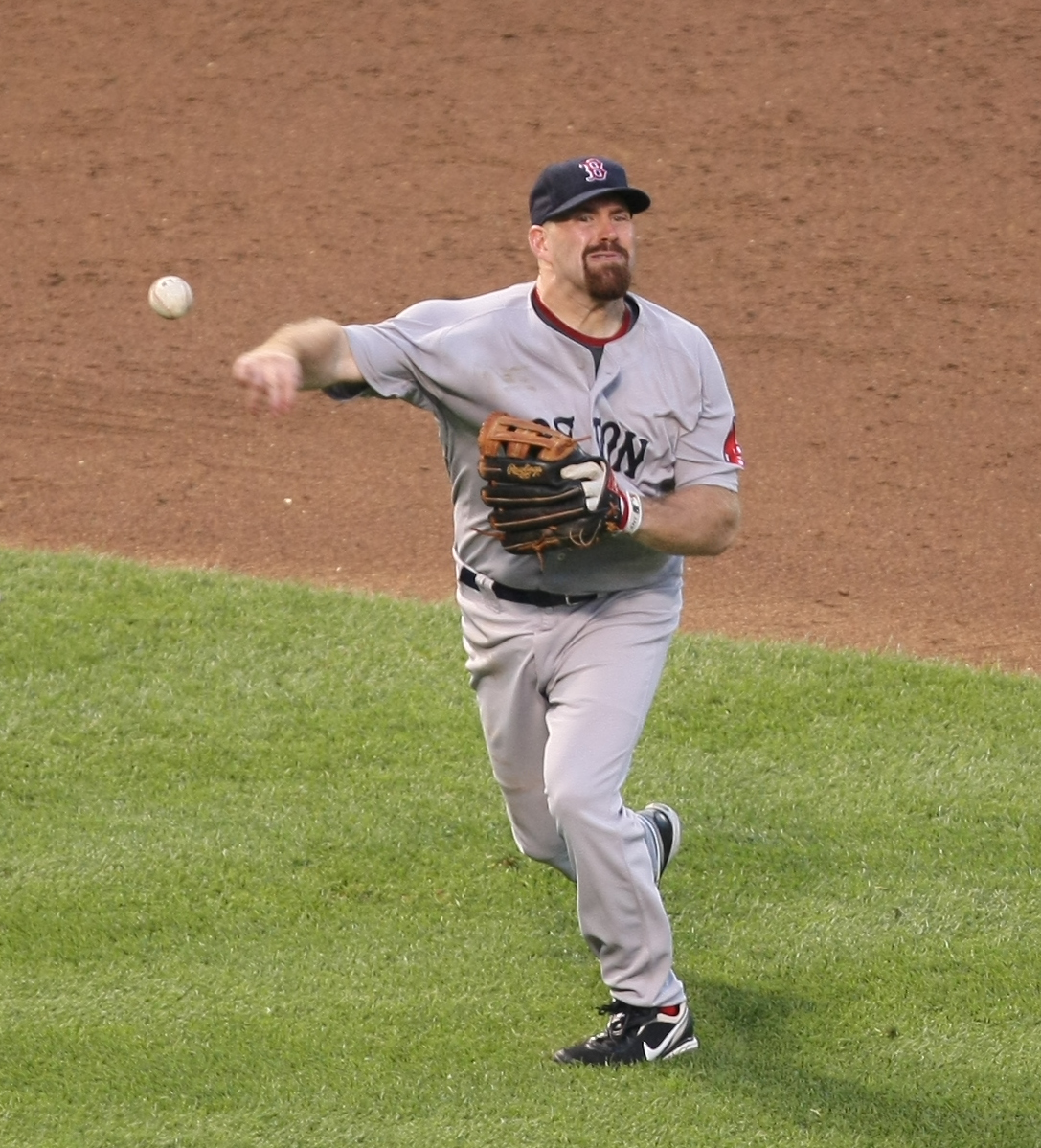
Gold Glove first baseman Kevin Youkilis

- April 2: Most consecutive games without an error for a first baseman – 194 by Kevin Youkilis; later extended to 238 games
- May 9: Most baserunners picked off, career – 92 Kenny Rogers (since stat was first recorded in 1974)
- May 16: Most consecutive starts with a no-decision – 9 by Shawn Chacón

== 2009 ==
- June 17: Most games caught – 2,227 by Iván Rodríguez; later extended to 2,427 games.

== 2010 ==
- August 4: Youngest player to reach 600 career home runs – Alex Rodriguez, age 35 years, 8 days

== 2011 ==
- August 2: Most games hitting home runs from both sides of the plate in a career – 12 by Mark Teixeira
- September 19: Most career saves – 602 by Mariano Rivera; later extended to 652 saves.

== 2012 ==
- April 17: Oldest pitcher to win a game – Jamie Moyer, age 49 years, 151 days. Extended record on May 16 (see below).
- May 16: Oldest player to drive in a run – Moyer, age 49 years, 180 days
- June 23: Most walk-off home runs – 13 by Jim Thome (since 1900)

== 2013 ==
- September 20: Most career grand slams – 24 by Alex Rodriguez; later extended to 25.

== 2015 ==
- October 21: Most consecutive postseason games with a home run – 6 by Daniel Murphy

== 2017 ==
- September 25: Most home runs by a rookie, season – 50 by Aaron Judge; later extended to 52.

== 2019 ==
- September 28: Most home runs by a rookie, season – 53 by Pete Alonso
