= Jeff Borris =

American sports agent

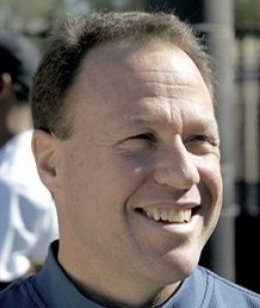
- Born: March 29, 1962 (age 63)
- Education: Cal State Northridge; Southwestern Law School, JD
- Occupation: Sports Agent/Attorney

Jeff Borris (born March 29, 1962) is an American sports agent and attorney.

== Professional career ==
Borris began his career as a sports agent as an intern at Beverly Hills Sports Council while at Southwestern Law School, which later became a full-time position. His fresh approach to baseball management soon meant that the intern became the owner along with two partners, Dan Horwits and childhood friend Rick Thurman.

Some of Borris' notable clients include Barry Bonds, Jose Canseco, Rickey Henderson, Bret Saberhagen, Bobby Bonilla, Brady Anderson, Curt Schilling, Trevor Hoffman, Michael Young, Tim Lincecum, Hunter Pence, Darren O'Day, Rick Van den Hurk, Mark Reynolds, Michael Schwimer, and Dan Uggla.

Borris also represented Dinesh Patel and Rinku Singh after the two Indian-born pitchers won an Indian reality television show called Million Dollar Arm Challenge and tried out in front of 30 major league scouts in November 2008. The two pitchers were later signed by the Pittsburgh Pirates and became the first Indian-born players to sign a professional sports contract of any kind in America.

In 2015, Borris joined Ballengee Group.

== Education ==
Borris earned his bachelor's degree in political science from California State University, Northridge and a Juris Doctor from Southwestern Law School. Borris was an adjunct professor of sports law at Southwestern Law School from 1993 to 2001.

== Personal ==
Borris was born in Los Angeles and raised in the San Fernando Valley.

Borris is also an accomplished poker player and appeared in High Stakes Hold’ Em Season 2 playing against professional players like Kenny Tran and Brian Rast.
