= List of Major League Baseball leaders =

List of Major League Baseball leaders include the following lists of leaders in various categories in Major League Baseball:

== General ==
- List of Major League Baseball titles leaders
- List of Major League Baseball career games started leaders
- List of Major League Baseball career games played leaders
- List of Major League Baseball career WAR leaders
- List of Major League Baseball consecutive games played leaders
- List of Major League Baseball longest winning streaks
- List of Major League Baseball longest losing streaks
- List of best Major League Baseball season win–loss records
- List of worst Major League Baseball season win–loss records
- List of Major League Baseball umpiring leaders

== Managerial ==
- List of Major League Baseball managers with most career ejections
- List of Major League Baseball managers with most career wins

== Batting ==
=== Hits ===
- List of Major League Baseball career hits leaders
  - 3,000 hit club
  - List of Major League Baseball progressive career hits leaders
- List of Major League Baseball single-game hits leaders

=== Doubles ===
- List of Major League Baseball career doubles leaders
- List of Major League Baseball annual doubles leaders

=== Triples ===
- List of Major League Baseball career triples leaders
- List of Major League Baseball annual triples leaders
- List of Major League Baseball single-season triples leaders

=== Home runs ===
- List of Major League Baseball career home run leaders
  - 500 home run club
  - 600 home run club
  - List of Major League Baseball progressive career home runs leaders
- List of Major League Baseball annual home run leaders
  - 50 home run club
  - List of Major League Baseball progressive single-season home run leaders
- List of Major League Baseball single-game home run leaders
- List of Major League Baseball single-inning home run leaders
- List of Major League Baseball single-game grand slam leaders
- List of Major League Baseball leaders in home runs by pitchers

=== Runs batted in ===
- List of Major League Baseball career runs batted in leaders
- List of Major League Baseball annual runs batted in leaders
- List of Major League Baseball single-game runs batted in leaders
- List of Major League Baseball single-inning runs batted in leaders

=== Average ===
- List of Major League Baseball career batting average leaders
- List of Major League Baseball batting champions
  - List of Major League Baseball players with a .400 batting average in a season

=== Other ===
- List of Major League Baseball career at bat leaders
- List of Major League Baseball career singles leaders
- List of Major League Baseball career total bases leaders
- List of Major League Baseball career strikeouts by batters leaders
- List of Major League Baseball career bases on balls leaders
- List of Major League Baseball career intentional bases on balls leaders
- List of Major League Baseball career hit by pitch leaders
- List of Major League Baseball career times on base leaders
- List of Major League Baseball career on-base percentage leaders
- List of Major League Baseball career slugging percentage leaders
- List of Major League Baseball career OPS leaders
- List of Major League Baseball career extra base hits leaders
- List of Major League Baseball hitting streak leaders

== Baserunning ==
=== Stolen bases ===
- List of Major League Baseball career stolen bases leaders
- List of Major League Baseball annual stolen base leaders

=== Runs scored ===
- List of Major League Baseball career runs scored leaders
- List of Major League Baseball annual runs scored leaders
- List of Major League Baseball single-game runs scored leaders

== Pitching ==
=== Wins ===
- List of Major League Baseball career wins leaders
  - 300 win club
- List of Major League Baseball annual wins leaders
- List of Major League Baseball single-season wins leaders

=== Losses ===
- List of Major League Baseball career losses leaders
- List of Major League Baseball single-season losses leaders

=== Strikeouts ===
- List of Major League Baseball career strikeout leaders
  - 3,000 strikeout club
- List of Major League Baseball annual strikeout leaders
  - 300 strikeout club
- List of Major League Baseball single-game strikeout leaders
- List of Major League Baseball single-inning strikeout leaders

=== Saves ===
- List of Major League Baseball career saves leaders
  - 300 save club
- List of Major League Baseball annual saves leaders

=== Earned run average ===
- List of Major League Baseball career ERA leaders
- List of Major League Baseball annual ERA leaders

=== Shutouts ===
- List of Major League Baseball career shutout leaders
- List of Major League Baseball annual shutout leaders

=== Other ===
- List of Major League Baseball career batters faced leaders
- List of Major League Baseball career innings pitched leaders
- List of Major League Baseball career games started leaders
- List of Major League Baseball career games finished leaders
- List of Major League Baseball career complete games leaders
- List of Major League Baseball career hit batsmen leaders
- List of Major League Baseball career bases on balls allowed leaders
- List of Major League Baseball career wild pitches leaders
- List of Major League Baseball career WHIP leaders

== Fielding ==
=== Errors ===
- List of Major League Baseball career fielding errors leaders
- List of Major League Baseball annual fielding errors leaders
- List of Major League Baseball career fielding errors as a pitcher leaders
- List of Major League Baseball career fielding errors as a catcher leaders
  - List of Major League Baseball career passed balls leaders
- List of Major League Baseball career fielding errors as a first baseman leaders
- List of Major League Baseball career fielding errors as a second baseman leaders
- List of Major League Baseball career fielding errors as a third baseman leaders
- List of Major League Baseball career fielding errors as a shortstop leaders
- List of Major League Baseball career fielding errors as a left fielder leaders
- List of Major League Baseball career fielding errors as a center fielder leaders
- List of Major League Baseball career fielding errors as a right fielder leaders
- List of Major League Baseball career fielding errors as an outfielder leaders

=== Putouts ===
- List of Major League Baseball career putouts leaders
- List of Major League Baseball annual putouts leaders
- List of Major League Baseball career putouts as a pitcher leaders
- List of Major League Baseball career putouts as a catcher leaders
- List of Major League Baseball career putouts as a first baseman leaders
- List of Major League Baseball career putouts as a second baseman leaders
- List of Major League Baseball career putouts as a third baseman leaders
- List of Major League Baseball career putouts as a shortstop leaders
- List of Major League Baseball career putouts as a left fielder leaders
- List of Major League Baseball career putouts as a center fielder leaders
- List of Major League Baseball career putouts as a right fielder leaders
- List of Major League Baseball career putouts as an outfielder leaders

=== Assists ===
- List of Major League Baseball career assists leaders
- List of Major League Baseball annual assists leaders
- List of Major League Baseball career assists as a pitcher leaders
- List of Major League Baseball career assists as a catcher leaders
- List of Major League Baseball career assists as a first baseman leaders
- List of Major League Baseball career assists as a second baseman leaders
- List of Major League Baseball career assists as a third baseman leaders
- List of Major League Baseball career assists as a shortstop leaders
- List of Major League Baseball career assists as a left fielder leaders
- List of Major League Baseball career assists as a center fielder leaders
- List of Major League Baseball career assists as a right fielder leaders
- List of Major League Baseball career assists as an outfielder leaders

=== Double plays ===
- List of Major League Baseball career double plays as a pitcher leaders
- List of Major League Baseball career double plays as a catcher leaders
- List of Major League Baseball career double plays as a first baseman leaders
- List of Major League Baseball career double plays as a second baseman leaders
- List of Major League Baseball career double plays as a third baseman leaders
- List of Major League Baseball career double plays as a shortstop leaders
- List of Major League Baseball career double plays as a left fielder leaders
- List of Major League Baseball career double plays as a center fielder leaders
- List of Major League Baseball career double plays as a right fielder leaders
- List of Major League Baseball career double plays as an outfielder leaders

== Games by position ==
- List of Major League Baseball career games played as a pitcher leaders
- List of Major League Baseball career games played as a catcher leaders
- List of Major League Baseball career games played as a first baseman leaders
- List of Major League Baseball career games played as a second baseman leaders
- List of Major League Baseball career games played as a third baseman leaders
- List of Major League Baseball career games played as a shortstop leaders
- List of Major League Baseball career games played as a left fielder leaders
- List of Major League Baseball career games played as a center fielder leaders
- List of Major League Baseball career games played as a right fielder leaders
- List of Major League Baseball career games played as an outfielder leaders

== Other feats ==
- List of Major League Baseball pitchers who have thrown an immaculate inning
- List of Major League Baseball players to hit for the cycle
- List of Major League Baseball players who spent their entire career with one franchise
- List of Major League Baseball players with a home run in their first major league at bat
- List of Major League Baseball players who completed an unassisted triple play
- List of Major League Baseball no-hitters
  - List of Major League Baseball perfect games

== See also ==
- List of Major League Baseball records
