= List of Major League Baseball records =

List of Major League Baseball records includes the following lists of the superlative statistics of Major League Baseball (MLB):

== General ==
- List of Major League Baseball career records
- List of Major League Baseball single-season records
- List of Major League Baseball single-game records
- List of Major League Baseball records considered unbreakable
- List of Major League Baseball record breakers by season
- List of Major League Baseball individual streaks

== Batting ==
- List of Major League Baseball hit records
- List of Major League Baseball doubles records
- List of Major League Baseball triples records
- List of Major League Baseball home run records
- List of Major League Baseball runs batted in records

== Pitching ==
- List of Major League Baseball wins records

== Baserunning ==
- List of Major League Baseball stolen base records
- List of Major League Baseball runs records

== Other ==
- List of Major League Baseball All-Star Game records
- List of Major League Baseball attendance records
- List of Major League Baseball postseason records
  - List of World Series career records
  - List of World Series single-game records
  - List of World Series single-series records

== See also ==
- List of Major League Baseball leaders
