= Greg Maddux =

American baseball player (born 1966)

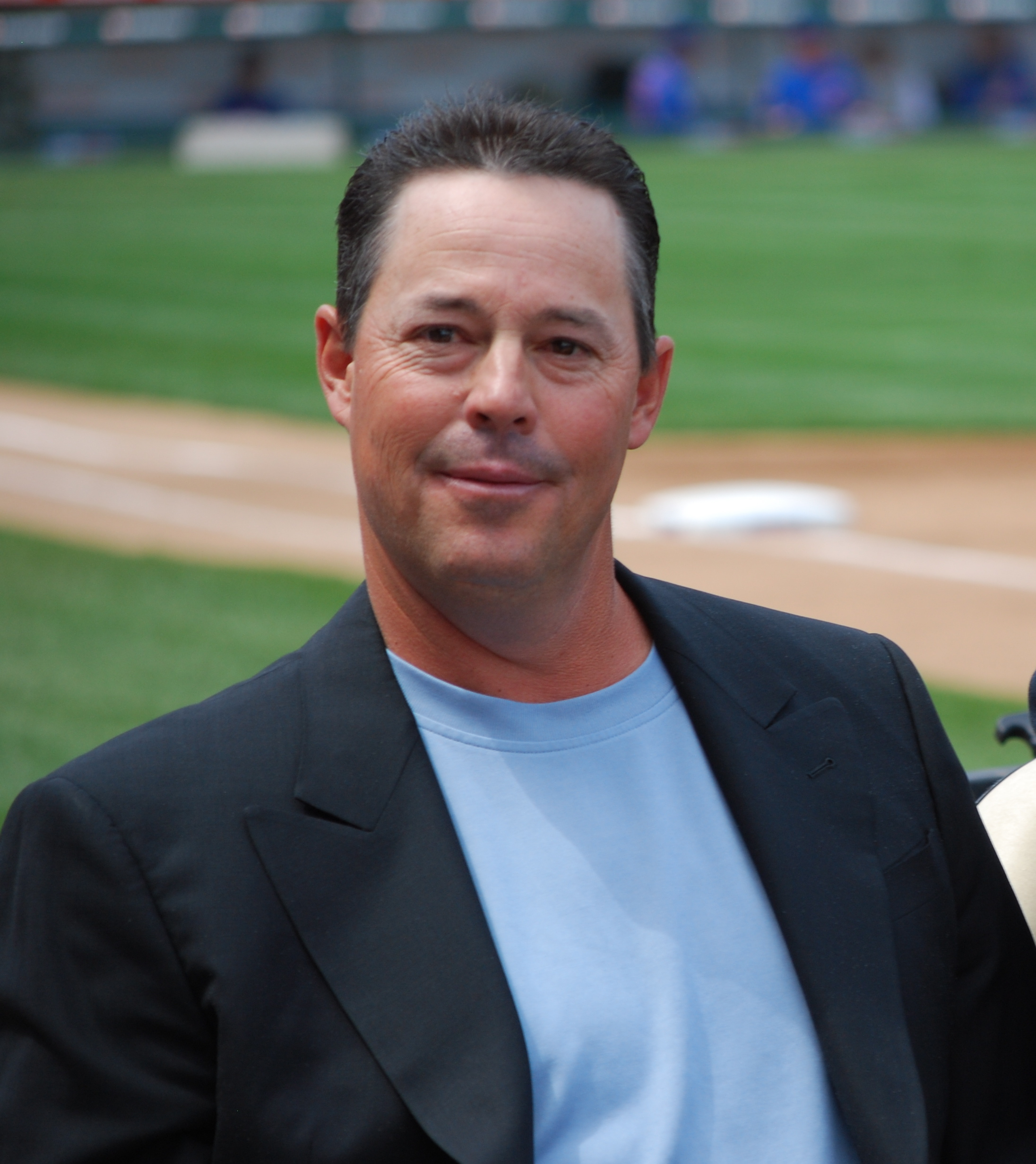
- Maddux in 2009
- Pitcher
- Born: April 14, 1966 (age 60); San Angelo, Texas, U.S.
- Batted: Right Threw: Right

MLB debut
- September 3, 1986, for the Chicago Cubs

Last MLB appearance
- September 27, 2008, for the Los Angeles Dodgers

MLB statistics
- Win–loss record: 355–227
- Earned run average: 3.16
- Strikeouts: 3,371
- Stats at Baseball Reference

Teams
- Chicago Cubs (1986–1992); Atlanta Braves (1993–2003); Chicago Cubs (2004–2006); Los Angeles Dodgers (2006); San Diego Padres (2007–2008); Los Angeles Dodgers (2008)

Career highlights and awards
- 8× All-Star (1988, 1992, 1994–1998, 2000); World Series champion (1995); 4× NL Cy Young Award (1992–1995); 18× Gold Glove Award (1990–2002, 2004–2008); 3× NL wins leader (1992, 1994, 1995); 4× NL ERA leader (1993–1995, 1998); Chicago Cubs No. 31 retired; Atlanta Braves No. 31 retired; Chicago Cubs Hall of Fame; Braves Hall of Fame

Member of the National

Baseball Hall of Fame
- Induction: 2014
- Vote: 97.2% (first ballot)

Gregory Alan Maddux (born April 14, 1966), also known as "Mad Dog" and "the Professor," is an American former professional baseball pitcher who played 23 seasons in Major League Baseball (MLB), primarily with the Atlanta Braves and Chicago Cubs. Maddux was the first pitcher in MLB history to win the Cy Young Award four consecutive years (1992–1995), a feat matched only by Randy Johnson. During those four seasons, Maddux had a 75–29 win–loss record with a 1.98 earned run average (ERA), while allowing fewer than one baserunner per inning. An eight-time All-Star, he won the 1995 World Series with the Braves over the Cleveland Indians.

Widely considered one of the greatest pitchers in baseball history, Maddux is the only pitcher in MLB history to win at least 15 games for 17 straight seasons. He also holds the record for most Gold Gloves by any player with 18, and most putouts by a pitcher with 546, including a tied live-ball-era record of 39 putouts in a season (1990, 1991, 1993). A superb control pitcher, Maddux won more games during the 1990s than any other pitcher and is 8th on the all-time career wins list with 355. Only Warren Spahn (363) recorded more career wins than Maddux since the start of the post-1920 live-ball era. Maddux also has the most wins among pitchers who made their debuts after World War II. He is one of only ten pitchers ever to achieve both 300 wins and 3,000 strikeouts, and is the only pitcher to record more than 300 wins, more than 3,000 strikeouts, and fewer than 1,000 walks (exactly 999 walks overall).

Since his retirement as a player, Maddux has also served as a special assistant to the general manager for both the Cubs and Texas Rangers. In 2014, he was voted into the Baseball Hall of Fame in his first year of eligibility, receiving 97.2% of the votes. In 2012, writer Jason Lukehart coined the term "Maddux" to describe when a pitcher throws a complete game shutout in fewer than 100 pitches; Maddux holds the record for most times accomplishing this feat (13) since pitch counts began to be tracked in 1988. The runner-up for this accomplishment is Zane Smith with seven such games.

== Early life ==
Gregory Alan Maddux was born on April 14, 1966, in San Angelo, Texas, and spent much of his childhood in Madrid, Spain, where the United States Air Force stationed his father. His father exposed him to baseball at an early age. Upon his return to Las Vegas, Nevada, Maddux and his brother Mike, who also became a major league baseball pitcher, trained under the supervision of Ralph Meder, a former scout from the majors. Meder preached the value of movement and location above velocity, and advised throwing softer when in a jam instead of harder. Maddux would later say, "I believed it. I don't know why. I just did."

Though Meder died before Maddux graduated from Valley High School in Las Vegas in 1984, he instilled a firm foundation that would anchor Maddux's future career. At Valley High, he was teammates on the school's baseball team with future Major League pitcher Steve Chitren and helped lead the school to a state championship as a junior in 1983. While in Las Vegas, he played American Legion Baseball with Post 8. He was named the organization's Graduate of the Year in 1984.

His brother, Mike, was drafted in 1982. When scouts went to observe the elder Maddux, their father, Dave, told them, "You will be back later for the little one." Some baseball scouts were unimpressed by Maddux's skinny build, but Chicago Cubs scout Doug Mapson saw past the physique. Mapson wrote a glowing review that read in part, "I really believe this boy would be the number one player in the country if only he looked a bit more physical."

== Professional career ==
=== Chicago Cubs (1986–1992) ===
The Chicago Cubs selected Maddux in the second round of the 1984 Major League Baseball draft and he chose to sign in lieu of honoring a commitment to play college baseball at the University of Arizona. He made his major league debut on September 3, 1986, the conclusion of the September 2 game which had been postponed due to darkness (lights were not installed at Wrigley Field until 1988). At the time, Maddux was the youngest player in the majors. His first appearance in a major league game was as a pinch runner (for catcher Jody Davis) in the 17th inning against the Houston Astros. Maddux then pitched in the 18th inning, allowing a home run to Billy Hatcher and taking the loss. His first start, five days later, was a complete game win. In his fifth and final start of 1986, Maddux defeated his older brother, who was pitching for the Philadelphia Phillies, marking the first time rookie brothers had pitched against each other. Mike Maddux was well used to his younger brother's competitive spirit, saying of their youth, "If Greg couldn't win, he didn't want to play, plain and simple."

In 1987, his first full season in the majors, Greg Maddux struggled significantly. Entering his start on July 8 against the San Diego Padres, Maddux was warned that if he did not get the win in what was his eighteenth start of the season, he would be sent back to Triple-A.

In the bottom of the third inning, Padres starter Eric Show hit Cubs star Andre Dawson in the face with a pitch that triggered a bench-clearing brawl. In the home dugout, Maddux made up his mind to retaliate when the Padres came to bat. However, because the game was not yet official, and retaliation would likely result in ejection from the game, Maddux would receive an automatic no-decision. Cubs ace Rick Sutcliffe tried to talk Maddux out of his intentions, reminding him of his impending demotion. Sutcliffe recalled Maddux looking back at him with tears in his eyes, saying that he did not care; with two outs in the top of the fourth, Maddux got his revenge by hitting Padres catcher Benito Santiago. Although he was ejected, the Cubs kept Maddux on the roster for several weeks before sending him down; he was quickly recalled after going undefeated in three starts for the Iowa Cubs with an ERA of 0.98, but finished his initial season in Chicago with six wins against fourteen losses and an ERA above 5.00.

Maddux rebounded to make his first All-Star appearance in 1988, winning eighteen games, and then established himself as the Cubs' ace in 1989, winning 19 games, including a September game at Montreal's Olympic Stadium that clinched the Cubs' second-ever National League Eastern Division championship. Manager Don Zimmer tabbed him to start Game One of the National League Championship Series against the San Francisco Giants. He allowed eight runs and was relieved after surrendering Will Clark's grand slam with two outs in the fourth. Maddux believed that just before the grand slam, when Maddux had a conversation with Zimmer, Clark watched, read Maddux's lips (Maddux said, "Fastball, high, inside), and so knew what pitch to expect. After that incident, Maddux always covered his mouth with his glove during conversations on the mound. Whether a direct result or not, it went on to become standard practice throughout baseball for all participants in a mid-inning mound visit, save for pitching changes. Maddux took a no-decision in Game Four; the Cubs ended up losing the NLCS four-games-to-one.

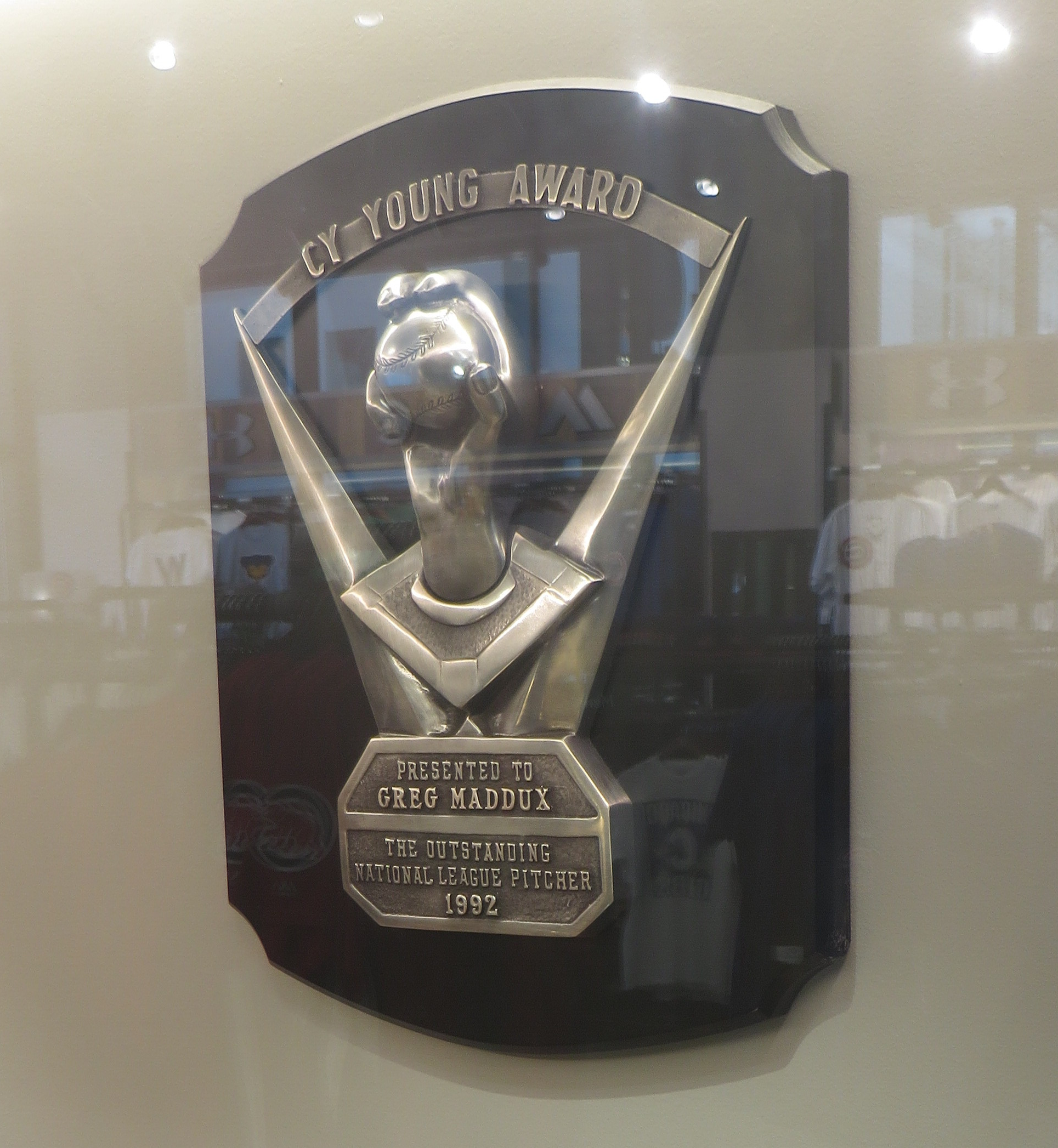
The 1992 Cy Young Award, awarded to Maddux

After consecutive 15-win seasons in 1990 and 1991, Maddux won 20 games in 1992, tied for the NL lead, and was voted his first National League Cy Young Award. Free agency was pending for Maddux, but contract talks with the Cubs became contentious and eventually ceased. Both Chicago general manager Larry Himes and Maddux's agent, Scott Boras, accused the other of failing to negotiate in good faith. The Cubs eventually decided to pursue other free agents, including José Guzmán, Dan Plesac, and Candy Maldonado. After seven seasons in Chicago, Maddux signed a five-year, $28 million deal with the Atlanta Braves.

=== Atlanta Braves (1993–2003) ===
Maddux made his debut with the Braves on April 5, 1993, as their opening day starter against the Cubs at Wrigley Field, beating his former teammates 1–0. He finished the regular season with a 20–10 record, led the NL with a 2.36 ERA, and won his second straight Cy Young Award. The Braves took their rotation of Maddux, 22-game winner Tom Glavine, 18-game winner Steve Avery, and 15-game winner John Smoltz to the postseason. Maddux won against the Philadelphia Phillies in Game Two of the NLCS, but with Atlanta trailing 3 games to 2, lost the decisive Game Six.

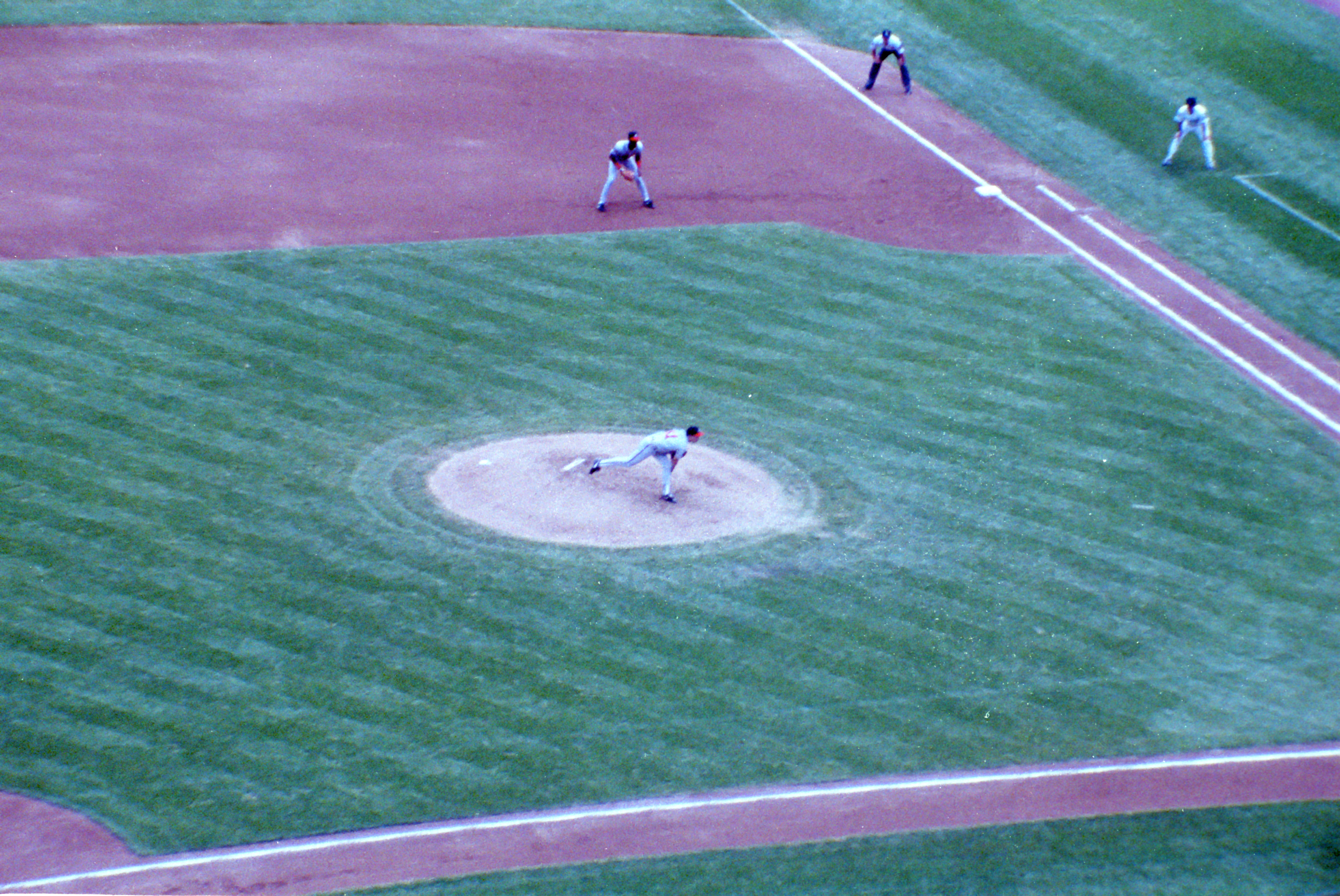
Maddux pitching for the Braves in 1994

During the strike-shortened 1994 season, Maddux posted an ERA of 1.56, the second-lowest since Bob Gibson's historic 1.12 in 1968, the last year of the elevated mound, and the lowest in the majors since Dwight Gooden's 1.53 in 1985. It pleased Maddux that his 1994 batting average (.222) was higher than his ERA. Maddux also led the National League in wins (with 16) and innings pitched (202) in his third Cy Young-winning year. He also finished 5th in National League Most Valuable Player voting.

In the 1995 season, Maddux was 19–2 and posted the third-lowest ERA since Gibson's: 1.63. Maddux became the first pitcher to post back-to-back ERAs under 1.80 since Walter Johnson in 1918 (1.27) and 1919 (1.49). Maddux's 1.63 ERA came in a year when the overall league ERA was 4.23. Since the beginning of the live-ball era in 1920, there have only been five pitchers to have full-season ERAs under 1.65: Gibson and Luis Tiant in the anomalous 1968 season, Gooden in 1985, and Maddux, twice. Maddux's 19 wins led the National League, for the third time in four seasons.

On May 28, 1995, he beat the Astros, losing a no-hitter on an eighth-inning home run to Jeff Bagwell. It was the only nine-inning one-hitter of his career. In June and July, Maddux threw 51 consecutive innings without issuing a walk. Maddux pitched effectively in all three of the Braves's postseason series, winning a game in each. His Game One victory in the 1995 World Series involved nine innings, two hits, no walks, and no earned runs with Orel Hershiser pitching for the Cleveland Indians. Maddux took the loss in Game Five, but the Atlanta Braves won their first World Series championship two days later. Following the 1995 season, Maddux won his fourth straight Cy Young Award, a major league record, and his second consecutive unanimous award. Maddux also finished third in that year's National League Most Valuable Player voting. The Atlanta Braves also made good on a pre-season promise to their pitching rotation, installing a putting green in the locker room at the newly built Turner Field following the World Series victory.

From 1996 to 1998, Maddux finished fifth, second, and fourth in the Cy Young voting. In August 1997, Maddux signed a $57.5-million, five-year contract extension that made him the highest-paid player in baseball. In February 2003, he avoided arbitration by signing a one-year $14.75-million deal. Maddux's production remained consistent: a 19–4 record in 1997, 18–9 in 1998, 19–9 in both 1999 and 2000, 17–11 in 2001, 16–6 in 2002, and 16–11 in 2003, his last season as a Brave. From 1993 to 1998, Maddux led the National League in ERA four times, and was second the other two seasons.

On July 22, 1997, Maddux threw a complete game with just 78 pitches (36 strikes, 20 batted balls, 13 balls, 5 hits, and 4 fouls) against the Cubs. Three weeks earlier, he had shut out the defending champion New York Yankees on 84 pitches, and five days before that he had beaten the Phillies with a 90-pitch complete game. Maddux allowed just 20 bases on balls in 1997, including six intentional walks.

Maddux struck out 200+ batters for the only time in his career in 1998. He outdueled the Cubs' Kerry Wood to clinch the NLDS, but the Braves were eliminated in the next round. The Braves returned to the World Series in 1999. Maddux was the Game One starter, and took a 1–0 lead into the eighth inning before a Yankee rally cost him the game and eventually the series as the Braves were swept.

On June 14, 2000, Maddux made his 387th putout to break Jack Morris's career record. In September 2000, he had a streak of 40 1/3 scoreless innings. He pitched poorly in his one playoff start of 2000. In May 2001, Maddux became the first Braves pitcher since 1916 to throw two 1–0 shutouts in the same month. The first included a career-best 14 strikeouts. In July and August of that year, Maddux pitched 72 1/3 consecutive innings without giving up a walk; that streak ended when he intentionally threw four balls to Steve Finley. In 2002, he won his 13th straight Gold Glove Award, a NL record. Maddux tied Jim Kaat's career record of 16 Gold Gloves after the 2006 season.

Throughout most of his years with the Braves, in the tradition of other pitching greats such as Steve Carlton, Maddux often had his own personal catcher. At various times Maddux used Charlie O'Brien, Eddie Pérez, Paul Bako, and Henry Blanco, for the majority of his starts, though regular starter Javy López did sometimes catch Maddux in the postseason.

Maddux was the crown jewel in the much-vaunted Braves trio of Maddux, Glavine, and Smoltz, who pitched together for over a decade as the core of the best pitching staff in the history of the game. The three were the linchpin of a team that won its division (the National League West in 1993 and the East from then on) every year that Maddux was on the team (1994 had no division champions). The three pitchers were frequently augmented by other strong starters such as Steve Avery, Kevin Millwood, Denny Neagle, and Russ Ortiz. In 1995, they pitched the Braves to a World Series title. In 29 postseason games with Atlanta, Maddux had a 2.81 ERA and a 1.19 WHIP, but just an 11–13 record.

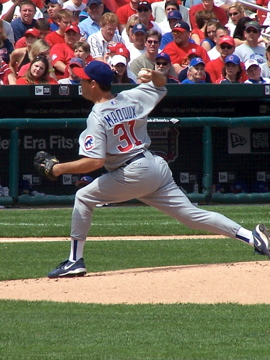
Maddux pitching for the Cubs in 2006

=== Second stint with the Chicago Cubs (2004–2006) ===
Maddux returned to the Cubs as a free agent prior to the 2004 season, when he signed with them on February 18, 2004. Maddux got his first win on April 23 after losing 3 consecutive games at the beginning of the season. On August 7, Maddux defeated the San Francisco Giants, 8–4, to garner his 300th career victory. In April 2005, he beat Roger Clemens for his 306th win in the first National League matchup between 300-game winners in 113 years. On July 26, 2005, after a three-hour rain delay, Maddux struck out Omar Vizquel to become the thirteenth member of the 3,000 strikeout club and only the ninth pitcher with both 300 wins and 3,000 strikeouts, having reached both marks against the San Francisco Giants. Maddux finished as one of the four pitchers to top 3,000 strikeouts while having allowed fewer than 1,000 walks (he had 999). The other three pitchers who have accomplished this feat are Ferguson Jenkins, Curt Schilling, and Pedro Martínez.

Maddux's 13–15 record in 2005 was his first losing record since 1987, and snapped a string of seventeen consecutive seasons with 15 or more wins. (Cy Young had surpassed the 15-win total for 15 straight years; both Young and Maddux reached 13+ wins for 19 consecutive seasons. This is even more impressive considering that Cy Young pitched in an era with no more than 4 regular starters that would average more than 40+ games per season, whereas Maddux pitched in an era with a 5-man rotation when reaching 40 starts in a season was virtually unheard of.)

=== Los Angeles Dodgers (2006) ===
Maddux's second stint with the Chicago Cubs lasted until mid-2006, when he was traded for the first time in his career, to the Los Angeles Dodgers. At the time, the Dodgers were in the thick of a playoff race. In his first Dodger start, Maddux threw six no-hit innings before a rain delay interrupted his debut. In his next start, Maddux needed just 68 pitches to throw eight shutout innings. On August 30, 2006, he won his 330th career game, passing Steve Carlton to take sole possession of 10th on the all-time list. On September 30, 2006, Maddux pitched seven innings in San Francisco, allowing two runs and three hits in a 4–2 victory over the Giants, clinching a postseason spot for the Dodgers and notching another 15-win season. It was Maddux's 18th season among his league's Top 10 for wins, breaking a record he'd shared with Cy Young and Warren Spahn, who did it 17 times apiece. However, the Dodgers were swept in the first round of the playoffs by the Mets. Maddux started the third and final game, throwing an ineffective no-decision. Maddux was honored with a Fielding Bible Award as the best fielding pitcher in MLB for 2006.

=== San Diego Padres (2007–2008) ===
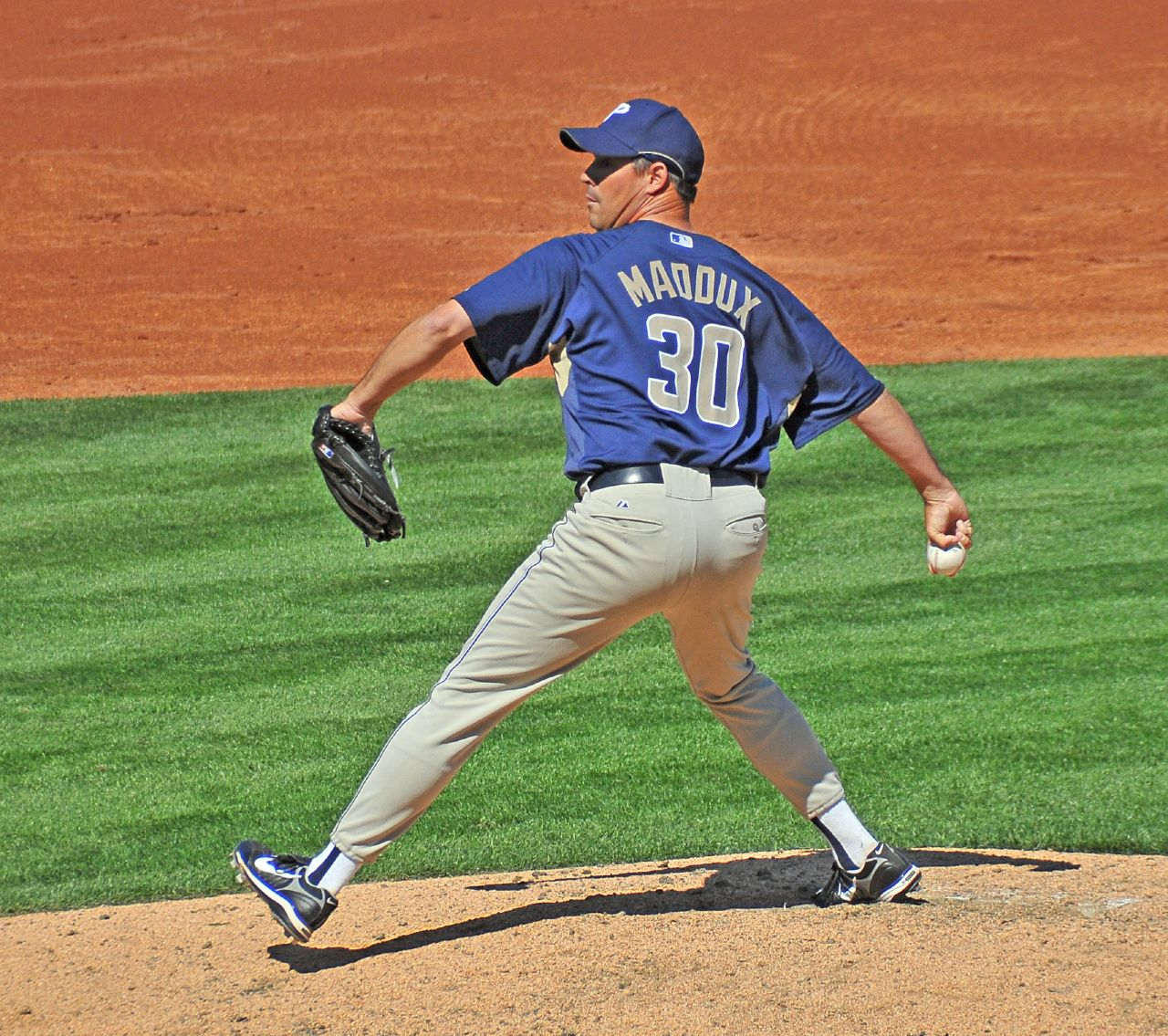
Maddux pitching for the Padres

On December 5, 2006, Maddux agreed to a one-year, $10 million deal with the San Diego Padres with a player option for the 2008 season, an option that Maddux later exercised at a reported $10 million. Maddux earned his 338th victory in the game that Trevor Hoffman earned his milestone 500th save. On August 24, 2007, he won his 343rd game to take sole possession of ninth place on the all-time win list. He achieved another milestone with the same win, becoming the only pitcher in the major leagues to have 20 consecutive seasons with at least 10 wins and placing him second on the list for most 10-win seasons, tied with Nolan Ryan and behind Don Sutton, who has 21. Also in 2007, Maddux reached 13 wins for the 20th consecutive season, passing Cy Young for that major league record. He finished the season with a career total 347 wins. Maddux won a record 17th Gold Glove award in 2007, surpassing the record held by Brooks Robinson. On May 10, 2008, Maddux won his 350th game. Also in 2008, he became the oldest pitcher to steal a base at 42, incidentally against the Braves.

=== Second stint with the Los Angeles Dodgers (2008) ===
Maddux was traded back to the Los Angeles Dodgers on August 19 for two players to be named later or cash considerations by the San Diego Padres. His return to Los Angeles was unlike his debut, though, as he allowed 7 earned runs on 9 hits while taking a loss against the Philadelphia Phillies.

Maddux pitched his 5,000th career inning against the San Francisco Giants on September 19. On September 27, in his final start of the season, he won his 355th game, moving him ahead of Roger Clemens into 8th place in all-time wins. Maddux ranks tenth in career strikeouts with 3,371. His strikeout total is balanced against 999 walks. For the 2008 season, he posted an 8–13 record. His 1.4 walks per 9 innings pitched were the best in the majors.

After the Dodgers won the National League West, Maddux was moved to the bullpen after manager Joe Torre decided to go with a three-man rotation. Maddux pitched three innings of relief during the series (which the Dodgers lost), allowing two runs. Maddux received his 18th Gold Glove Award in November 2008, extending his own major league record. In December, he announced his retirement.

== Post-playing career ==
On January 11, 2010, Maddux was hired by the Chicago Cubs as an assistant to General Manager Jim Hendry. In his return to Chicago, his focus was on developing pitchers' styles and techniques throughout the organization, including minor league affiliates. For the 2012 season Maddux left his position with the Cubs and joined the Texas Rangers organization, where his brother Mike was the pitching coach.

He was announced as the pitching coach for the USA team in the 2013 World Baseball Classic.

On February 2, 2016, he was hired by the Dodgers as a special assistant to the President of Baseball Operations, Andrew Friedman.

On July 6, 2016, Maddux was hired as an assistant baseball coach for the University of Nevada, Las Vegas. For 4 years, he served as the pitching coach. Greg's son, Chase, was a pitcher for the Rebels.

On February 14, 2023, Maddux was hired as a special assistant for Spring Training by the Texas Rangers, joining his brother Mike Maddux, who became the team's new pitching coach.

== Pitching style ==
Maddux relied on his command, composure, and guile to outwit hitters. Though his fastball touched 93 mph in his early years, his velocity steadily declined throughout his career, and was never his principal focus as a pitcher. By the end of his career, his fastball averaged less than 86 mph. Maddux was also noted for the late movement on his sinker (two-seam fastball), which, combined with his control, made him known as an excellent groundball pitcher. While Maddux was not known for his strikeout totals, his strikeout totals have often been undersold because strikeout rate has often been measured per nine innings, rather than per batter faced. Maddux alternated his two-seam fastball with an excellent circle changeup. Though these served as his primary pitches, he also threw a curveball and a cutter.

Maddux was renowned for focusing on the outside corner. This approach was emphasized under former Atlanta Braves pitching coach Leo Mazzone. He would begin by throwing strikes with his fastball down and away, and then expand the strike zone with his changeup—sometimes obtaining borderline strike calls from umpires simply on the strength of his reputation. In complement with this strategy, Maddux popularized a tactic of throwing his two-seam fastball off the plate inside to left-handed hitters, only to have the ball break back over the inside corner for a strike. Maddux said of that pitch, "That was just my normal fastball that did that. ... I always had it. The pitch really started to work for me when I ... learned how to throw a cutter, it made that pitch more effective."

In addition, his propensity for throwing strikes and avoiding walks kept his pitch counts low. On July 2, 1997, he won a game against the New York Yankees, for example, with the numbers "nine innings, three hits, no walks, eight strikeouts, one pickoff, one double play, 84 pitches ... [in] two hours and nine minutes". Dodgers general manager Fred Claire admired Maddux's pitching consistency, saying "It's almost like a guy lining up a 60-foot-6-inch putt ... he is just so disciplined, so repetitive in his pitches." Speaking about Maddux's accuracy, Orel Hershiser said, "This guy can throw a ball in a teacup." Baseball Hall of Famer Wade Boggs talked about facing Maddux: "It seems like he's inside your mind with you. When he knows you're not going to swing, he throws a straight one. He sees into the future. It's like he has a crystal ball hidden inside his glove."

Maddux was also known for intensely studying hitters in preparation for his starts. He would often watch hitters take their warmup swings or read their body language to gauge their mentality. Teammate Tom Glavine said, "I think the hitters think he can go back and recall every pitch he has ever thrown. That's not the case, but I think he's probably better at remembering things than most people are. He's definitely better in the course of the game at making adjustments on a hitter based on what he's seen, whether it's one swing or a guy's last at-bat."

Finally, Maddux has been praised for his superior pitching mechanics, helping him avoid serious arm injuries throughout his lengthy career. His only stint on the 15-day disabled list was in 2002, due to nerve inflammation on his back. One analyst of pitching mechanics wrote, "Maddux's sterling reputation for pitching mechanics is more than justified. He could repeat his delivery as well as any pitcher that I have ever seen, with consistent timing and positioning that persisted regardless of pitch type or pitch count, giving the impression that he was never fatigued." Maddux was also a highly durable pitcher, leading the National League in innings pitched in five consecutive years. He pitched at least 194 innings for 21 consecutive seasons, and finished with the lowest BB/9 ratio in the National League nine times.

== Pitching profile ==
Greg Maddux's number 31 was retired by the Chicago Cubs in 2009.

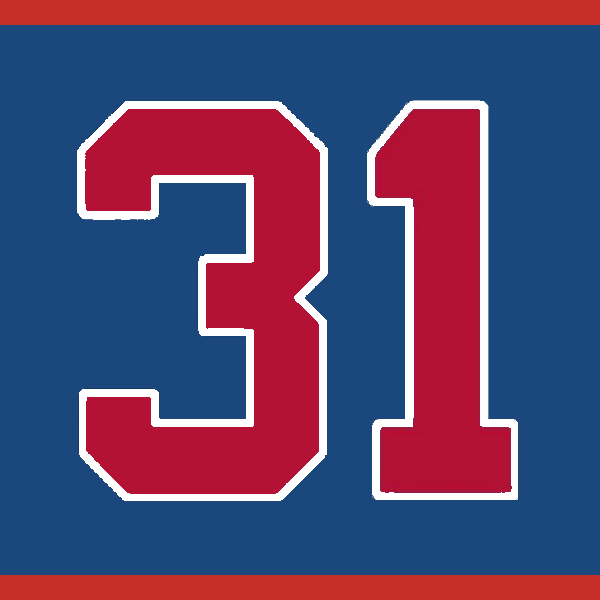
Greg Maddux's number 31 was retired by the Atlanta Braves in 2009.

Maddux has been credited by many of his teammates with a superior ability to out-think his opponents and anticipate results. Braves catcher Eddie Pérez tells the story of Maddux, with an eight run lead, intentionally allowing a home run to the Astros' Jeff Bagwell, in anticipation of facing Bagwell in the playoffs months later. Maddux felt Bagwell would instinctively be looking for the same pitch again—an inside fastball—which Maddux would then refuse to throw. Maddux did face Bagwell in the playoffs that year, and struck him out with the bases loaded using three changeups. On another occasion while sitting on the bench, Maddux once told his teammates, "Watch this, we might need to call an ambulance for the first base coach." The batter, Los Angeles' José Hernández, drove the next pitch into the chest of the Dodgers' first base coach. Maddux had noticed that Hernández, who'd been pitched inside by Braves pitching during the series, had shifted his batting stance slightly. On another occasion, a former teammate, outfielder Marquis Grissom, recalled a game in 1996 when Maddux was having trouble spotting his fastball. Between innings, he told Grissom, "Gary Sheffield is coming up next inning. I am going to throw him a slider and make him just miss it so he hits it to the warning track." The at-bat went as Maddux had predicted.

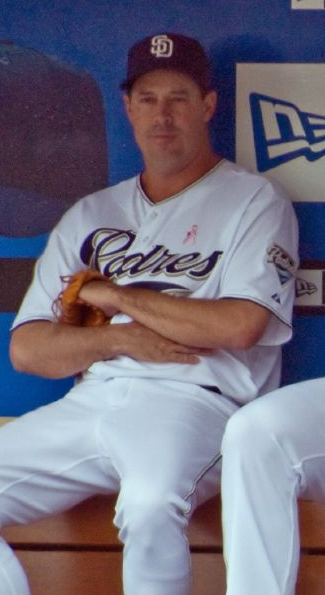
Maddux in the dugout in 2008

Early in the 2000 season, Maddux was asked by sportswriter Bob Nightengale what had been the most memorable at-bat of his pitching career. Maddux said it was striking out Dave Martinez to end a regular season game. Nightengale was surprised Maddux hadn't picked a postseason game, or a more famous player. Maddux explained: "I remember that one because he got a hit off me in the same situation (full count, bases loaded, two out in the 9th inning) seven years earlier. I told myself if I ever got in the same situation again, I'll pitch him differently. It took me seven years, but I got him."

Publicly, however, Maddux is dismissive of his reputation, saying, "People think I'm smart? You know what makes you smart? Locate your fastball down and away. That's what makes you smart. You talk to Sandy Koufax, Bob Gibson, or Tom Seaver. They'll all tell you the same thing. It's not your arm that makes you a great pitcher. It's that thing between both of your ears we call a brain."

To this day, Maddux maintains Koufax, Gibson, and Seaver are the three best pitchers of the "live ball" era of baseball. Informed by The Sporting News he had been voted best pitcher of the 1990s, he replied, "It [the award] could have gone to Glavine or Smoltz just as easily and each would have deserved it. They're both great pitchers."

Maddux never walked more than 82 batters in any season of his career, averaging fewer than 2 walks per game. In 1997, Maddux allowed 20 walks in 232+ innings, or 0.77 per nine innings. In 2001, he set a National League record by going 72 1/3 innings without giving up a walk.

Maddux's low walk totals also kept his pitch counts down, enabling him to go deeper into games. In 31 starts, Maddux threw nine innings with 100 or fewer pitches. Ten of those starts were under 90 pitches, including a 78-pitch complete game in July 1997, the most efficient start by any pitcher since 1979. In recognition of this, the statistic describing a complete game shut-out thrown in fewer than 100 pitches was named after him. Maddux is the career leader for this stat, having pitched 13 such games.

He is also known to finish the game quickly. On June 27, 1998, he pitched a complete-game shutout against the Toronto Blue Jays in 102 pitches, but it was his fastest game in terms of time: 106 minutes, or 1 hour 46 minutes. This is including the customary 6th-inning timeout and mound visit.

== Awards ==
In addition to his pitching skills, Maddux was an excellent fielding pitcher. He won 18 Gold Gloves, the record for any position. Of his 18 total awards, Maddux won 10 with the Braves, five with the Cubs, two with the Dodgers and one with the Padres. Maddux was also a good hitting pitcher, with a career .171 batting average, including four seasons batting .200 or better. He hit 5 home runs, with 84 RBIs.

Maddux pitched in 13 Division Series contests, 17 League Championship games and five World Series games. He has a 3.27 ERA in 198 postseason innings, including an outstanding 2.09 ERA in 38 2/3 World Series innings. He was chosen for the National League All-Star team eight times.

Maddux won 20 games only twice, in 1992 and 1993. However, he won 19 games five times (including the 1995 season which was reduced to 144 games from the strike of 1994), 18 games twice, and 16 in the strike shortened 1994 season (which was reduced to 115 games). He won four ERA titles (in 1993–1995 and 1998), and led the NL in shutouts five times. He holds the major league record for seasons leading his league in games started (7). He also holds the record for most seasons finishing in the top 10 in the league in wins (18).

In his 2009 book, "The Annual Baseball Gold Mine" baseball statistics guru Bill James found Maddux to be far and away the most underrated player in baseball history. The methodology for this included the fact that though Maddux only won 20 games twice, he won 19 games five times. He also had only one season of 200 or more strikeouts but had seasons of 199, 198 and 197, respectively, which diminished his reputation as a strikeout pitcher. In addition to that James also argued that although he had 18 seasons of 200 or more innings pitched, he also had three seasons of 199 1/3, 198 and 194 innings pitched.

In 1999, Maddux ranked 39th on The Sporting News' list of the 100 Greatest Baseball Players, the highest-ranking pitcher then active. He was also nominated as a finalist for the Major League Baseball All-Century Team. However, when TSN updated their list in 2005, Maddux had fallen to number 51.

The Cubs retired jersey number 31 on May 3, 2009, in honor of Maddux and Ferguson Jenkins. The Atlanta Braves retired Maddux's number 31, on July 17, 2009.

"I get asked all the time was he the best pitcher I ever saw. Was he the smartest pitcher I ever saw? The most competitive I ever saw? The best teammate I ever saw? The answer is yes to all of those", said Braves manager Bobby Cox at the banquet to induct Maddux into the Atlanta Braves Hall of Fame at the Omni Hotel in Atlanta on July 17, 2009.

On January 8, 2014, Maddux was elected to the Baseball Hall of Fame. The pitcher later announced that he would not have a team logo on his plaque, citing his history with the Atlanta Braves and Chicago Cubs: "It's impossible for me to choose one of those teams ... as the fans of both clubs in each of those cities were so wonderful", Maddux said.

== Personal life ==
Maddux was born on April 14, 1966. He is married to Kathy. The couple has two children: a daughter and a son. They reside in Las Vegas.

In 2002, in the episode "Take Me out of the Ballgame", of the TV series Do Over, the main character lost a baseball game to a young Greg Maddux, who was played by Shad Hart.

The song "Movement and Location" from the Punch Brothers album Who's Feeling Young Now? was written about Maddux.

== See also ==
- Atlanta Braves award winners and league leaders
- Chicago Cubs award winners and league leaders
- List of Atlanta Braves team records
- List of Major League Baseball annual shutout leaders
- List of Major League Baseball individual streaks
- List of Major League Baseball career batters faced leaders
- List of Major League Baseball career games started leaders
- List of Major League Baseball career hit batsmen leaders
- List of Major League Baseball career innings pitched leaders
- List of Major League Baseball career losses leaders
- List of Major League Baseball career putouts as a pitcher leaders
- List of Major League Baseball career WHIP leaders
- Major League Baseball titles leaders

Achievements
Preceded by Pete Harnisch	NL hits per nine innings 1994	Succeeded by Hideo Nomo
