= Gus Weyhing =

American baseball player (1866–1955)

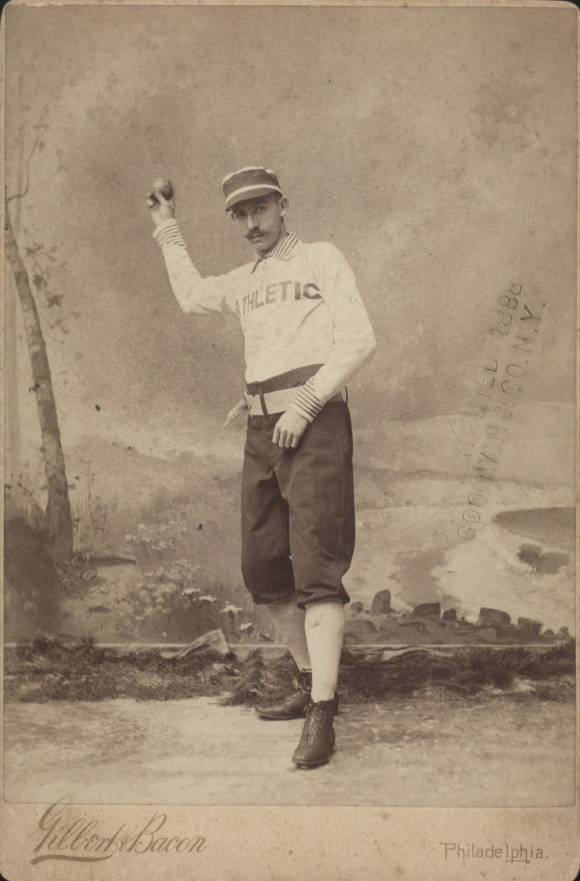
- 1888 baseball card of Weyhing
- Pitcher
- Born: September 29, 1866; Louisville, Kentucky, U.S.
- Died: September 4, 1955 (aged 88); Louisville, Kentucky, U.S.
- Batted: Right Threw: Right

MLB debut
- May 2, 1887, for the Philadelphia Athletics

Last MLB appearance
- August 21, 1901, for the Cincinnati Reds

MLB statistics
- Win–loss record: 264–232
- Earned run average: 3.88
- Strikeouts: 1,667
- Stats at Baseball Reference

Teams
- Philadelphia Athletics (1887–1889); Brooklyn Ward's Wonders (1890); Philadelphia Athletics (1891); Philadelphia Phillies (1892–1895); Pittsburgh Pirates (1895); Louisville Colonels (1895–1896); Washington Senators (1898–1899); St. Louis Cardinals (1900); Brooklyn Superbas (1900); Cleveland Blues (1901); Cincinnati Reds (1901)

Career highlights and awards
- Pitched a no-hitter on July 31, 1888

August Weyhing (September 29, 1866 – September 4, 1955) was an American pitcher in professional baseball. Nicknamed "Cannonball", "Rubber Arm Gun", and "Rubber-Winged Gus", he played for nine different Major League Baseball (MLB) teams from 1887 to 1901. Weyhing had a career win–loss record of 264–232. He holds the record for most batters hit in a career, with 277, and was the last major league pitcher to play without a baseball glove.

== Early life ==
Weyhing was born on September 29, 1866, in Louisville, Kentucky, to immigrant parents from Württemberg, Germany. He was listed at 5 feet 10 inches tall and 145 pounds. He had a younger brother, John Weyhing, who also pitched in the major leagues, and four older siblings.

In 1885, he excelled as an amateur pitcher for a company baseball team in Richmond, Indiana.

== Professional career ==
=== Early career, 1886–1892 ===
In January 1886, Weyhing signed a contract with the Charleston Seagulls of the Southern League. He posted a 0.76 ERA in 32 starts, though he also hit 25 batters and threw 43 wild pitches.

Gus Weyhing started his MLB career in 1887 with the National League's Philadelphia Quakers (later Phillies), though this was limited to a pair of exhibition appearances against the American Association's Philadelphia Athletics. The Quakers released Weyhing, but the Athletics picked him up; he debuted officially on May 2. In his rookie campaign, he led the league in hit batsmen (37) and set the rookie record for wild pitches (49). Weyhing also led the league in those categories the next year, with 56 wild pitches and 42 HBP.

On April 28, 1888, he came within one out of a no-hitter against the Brooklyn Bridegrooms.

On July 6, 1888, during a game in Cincinnati, Weyhing left the field in protest of an umpire's call, earning him a $200 fine.

On July 31, 1888, he pitched a no-hitter against the Kansas City Cowboys. He walked one batter, and another reached base on an error. During one week in the 1888 season, he pitched three consecutive complete game victories against Brooklyn to eliminate that team from the pennant race.

In 1890, Weyhing signed with the Brooklyn Ward's Wonders of the Players' League. His personal behavior became increasingly erratic as he dealt with the sudden deaths of his mother and brother, John, within a short period that year. He was ejected from a late-season start against Buffalo and then arrested for disorderly conduct when he drunkenly confronted the umpire after the game (though the charges were dropped). In the offseason, an arrest warrant was issued against him for vandalizing a painting in a Buffalo tavern, though he left for Louisville before being served a summons. In January 1892, he was arrested (but later acquitted at trial) of stealing pigeons from a Louisville pigeon show.

=== Later career, 1893–1910 ===
Weyhing struggled to adapt to changes made to the National League playing field in 1893, chief of which was the elimination of the "pitcher's box" 50 feet from home plate and its replacement with the pitcher's plate 60 feet, 6 inches from home. His ERA jumped from 2.66 in 1892 to 5.71 in 1894.

In 1895, Weyhing made three consecutive starts for three separate clubs—the Philadelphia Phillies, the Pittsburgh Pirates, and his hometown Louisville Colonels—a unique feat until Jaime García replicated it in 2017. With his effectiveness declining as a pitcher, Weyhing spent the 1897 season in the minors. He pitched two full seasons with the Washington Senators in 1898 and 1899, before spending the next two seasons on four other major league clubs. He returned to the minors for the 1902 and 1903 seasons.

Weyhing made a short-lived minor league comeback in 1910, with stints as a player and manager in the Western Association, and a two-week tenure as a Texas League umpire.

=== Career overview ===
During the first six years of his MLB career, Weyhing won over 25 games, capped by a 32-win season in 1892 for the Phillies. That season, he had 469 2/3 innings pitched, completing 46 of his 49 starts with six shutouts. He had 216 wins in his first eight seasons. His performance declined after that, although he stayed in the majors until 1901. His adjusted ERA+ totals were over 100 every season from 1888 to 1892; they were below 100 for the rest of his career.

Overall, Weyhing had 4,337 innings pitched, a 264–232 win–loss record, a 3.88 ERA, and 1,667 strikeouts. He had a relatively long career for a 19th-century pitcher and thus is still on the MLB career leaderboards in many pitching categories. He holds the MLB record for the most career hit batsmen, with 277. No other pitcher in history has more than 219. Weyhing is also tied for fifth all-time in most career wild pitches.

Weyhing was considered a poor hitter and suspect fielder. In 1,980 career plate appearances, he had a batting average of .166.

== Life outside baseball ==
Weyhing married his wife, Mollie, in Jeffersonville, Indiana in November 1888; they divorced in 1900. In January 1901, he married Mamie Gehrig, a future cousin of Yankees star Lou Gehrig.

In 1892, Weyhing was accused of stealing two pigeons at a bird show in Louisville. The charges against him were dismissed when the complaining witness failed to appear in court.

Weyhing spent his post-baseball years in Louisville, where he worked as a policeman, a saloonkeeper, and a night watchman for the Louisville Water Company. He died in Louisville on September 4, 1955.

== See also ==
- List of Major League Baseball career records
- List of Major League Baseball wins records
- List of Major League Baseball career wins leaders
- List of Major League Baseball career losses leaders
- List of Major League Baseball career batters faced leaders
- List of Major League Baseball career innings pitched leaders
- List of Major League Baseball career games started leaders
- List of Major League Baseball career complete games leaders
- List of Major League Baseball career bases on balls allowed leaders
- List of Major League Baseball career wild pitches leaders
- List of Major League Baseball career hit batsmen leaders
- List of Major League Baseball annual saves leaders
- List of Major League Baseball single-season wins leaders
- List of Major League Baseball single-season losses leaders
- List of Major League Baseball no-hitters

Achievements
Preceded by Ed Seward	No-hitter pitcher July 31, 1888	Succeeded by Ledell Titcomb
