= Win–loss record (pitching) =

Baseball statistic

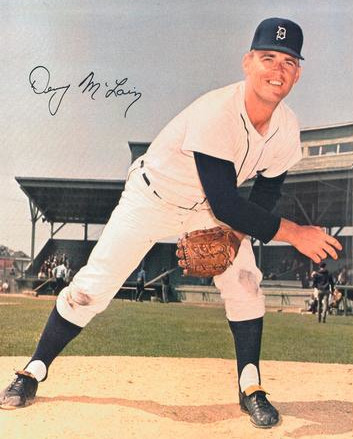
Denny McLain pitched to a 31–6 record during the 1968 Major League Baseball season.

In baseball and softball, a win–loss record (also referred to simply as a record) is a statistic that indicates the number of wins (denoted "W") and losses (denoted "L") credited to a pitcher. For example, a 20–10 win–loss record would represent 20 wins and 10 losses.

In each game, one pitcher on the winning team is awarded a win (the "winning pitcher") and one pitcher on the losing team is given a loss (the "losing pitcher") in their respective statistics. These pitchers are collectively known as the pitchers of record. The designation of win or loss for a pitcher is known as a decision, and only one pitcher for each team receives a decision. A starting pitcher who does not receive credit for a win or loss is said to have no decision. In certain situations, another pitcher on the winning team who pitched in relief of the winning pitcher can be credited with a save, and holds can be awarded to relief pitchers on both sides, but these are never awarded to the pitcher who is awarded the win.

The decisions are awarded by the official scorer of the game in accordance with the league's rules. The official scorer does not assign a winning or losing pitcher in some games which are forfeited, such as those that are tied at the time of forfeiture. If the game is tied (a rare event), no pitcher is awarded any decision. A pitcher's winning percentage is calculated by dividing the number of wins by the number of decisions (wins plus losses), and it is commonly expressed to three decimal places.

== Winning pitcher ==
A pitcher is awarded with a win if he pitches prior to the half-inning when his team maintains the lead that it never relinquishes.

There are two exceptions to this rule. The first is that a starting pitcher must complete a minimum of five innings, the length of an official game, to earn a win. Failure to do so results in the ineligibility to be the winning pitcher, even if he last pitched prior to the half-inning when he maintains his team's lead. The official scorer awards the win to the relief pitcher who, in the official scorer's judgment, was the most effective.

The second exception applies if the relief pitcher who last pitched prior to the half-inning when the winning team took the lead the last time was "ineffective in a brief appearance" in the official scorer's judgment, in which case the win is awarded to the succeeding relief pitcher who, in the official scorer's judgment, was the most effective.

In the MLB All-Star Game, every pitcher is considered as a relief pitcher for the purpose of this rule. For example, Shohei Ohtani, the starter for the American League, was awarded the win in the 2021 All-Star Game despite throwing only 14 pitches in a single inning.

== Losing pitcher ==
A pitcher is charged with a loss if he is charged with the go-ahead run that proves to be the opposing team's game winning run, meaning his team does not later tie the game or regain the lead.

If a pitcher is charged with a run that gives the opposing team the lead, his team comes back to lead or tie the game, and then the opposing team regains the lead against a subsequent pitcher, the prior pitcher will not be charged with the loss.

If a pitcher leaves the game with his team in the lead or with the score tied, but with the go-ahead run on base, and this runner subsequently scores the go-ahead run, the pitcher who allowed this runner to reach base is responsible for the loss. This is true regardless of the manner in which this batter originally reached base, and how he subsequently scored. If the relief pitching successfully completes the half-inning without surrendering the go-ahead run, the departed pitcher cannot receive a loss.

For example, on April 13, 2007, Carlos Zambrano of the Chicago Cubs was facing the Cincinnati Reds in the top of the 5th inning. He was taken out of the game with the Cubs leading 5–4 and the bases loaded. The pitcher who replaced him, Will Ohman, proceeded to allow two of the inherited runners to score, giving the Reds a 6–5 lead. Although Zambrano was not pitching at the time the runs were scored, he was charged with the loss, as the base runners who scored were his responsibility.

== Background ==
The pitchers who receive the win and the loss are known, collectively, as the pitchers of record. A pitcher who starts a game but leaves without earning either a win or a loss (that is, before either team gains or surrenders the ultimate lead) is said to have received a no decision, regardless of his individual performance. A pitcher's total wins and losses are commonly noted together; for instance, a pitching record of 12–10 indicates 12 wins and 10 losses.

In the early years of Major League Baseball before 1900, top pitchers regularly had 30 or more wins in one season, with Old Hoss Radbourn of the Providence Grays holding the record with 60 wins in 1884. Since 1900, however, pitchers have made fewer and fewer starts, and the standard has changed. Gradually, as hitting improved, better pitching was needed. This meant, among other things, throwing the ball much harder, and it became unrealistic to ask a pitcher to throw nearly as hard as he could for over 100 pitches a game without giving him several days to recover.

In the first third of the 20th century (especially after the live-ball era), winning 30 games became the rare mark of excellent achievement; this standard diminished to 25 games during the 1940s through 1980s. The only pitcher to win 30 or more games during that time was Denny McLain in 1968, in what was an anomalous pitching-dominated season.

Since 1990, this has changed even further, with winning 20 or more games in a single season achieved by only a handful of pitchers each season. For example, in 2004 only three of the more than 500 major league pitchers did so. In 2006 and again in 2009, no pitcher in either league won 20 games. The last pitcher to win 25 games was Bob Welch in 1990. Since 2013, only 15 pitchers have won 20 games in a season, most recently Kyle Wright in 2022.

The New York Times wrote in 2011 that as advanced statistics have expanded, a pitcher's win–loss record has decreased in importance. Many times, a win is substantially out of the pitcher's control; even a dominant pitcher cannot record a win if his team does not score any runs for him. For example, Félix Hernández won the Cy Young Award in 2010 in spite of a 13–12 record. During that season, the Mariners scored the fewest runs in the majors that season, while Hernandez posted an ERA of 2.27 and pitched a league-high 249 2/3 innings. Similarly, in 2004, Milwaukee Brewers starter Ben Sheets had a losing record of 12–14, despite displaying a league-best 8.25 strikeout-to-walk ratio and was among the top 5 pitchers in ERA (2.70) and WHIP (0.98). Later, Jacob deGrom won consecutive Cy Young Awards despite recording 10 wins in 2018 and 11 wins in 2019.

In addition to their dependence on run support, wins for a starting pitcher are also dependent on bullpen support. A starting pitcher can pitch well, leaving the game with the lead, and then watch helplessly from the dugout as relievers gives up the lead. That would entitle the starting pitcher to a no-decision instead of a win despite the strong performances, regardless of whether or not the team ends up winning. Starting pitchers on teams with a weak bullpen tend to have fewer wins because of this. Likewise, a pitcher can give a poor performance and give up many runs and leave the game earlier than desired, but still win because his team scored even more runs. Some prefer the quality start statistic as an indication of how many times a starting pitcher gave his team a realistic chance to win.

== Decision records ==
Pud Galvin (1883) holds the major league record for most decisions (75) in a season. During the 1908 season, Ed Walsh had 55 decisions, which remains the most in a season since 1900. Wilbur Wood holds the season record for the live-ball era (1920–present), recording 44 decisions in 1973. As of 2024, Roy Halladay and Adam Wainwright (31 decisions each in 2010) were the last pitchers to have had 30 or more decisions in a season. The career record is held by Cy Young, who had 826 decisions between 1890 and 1911.

== See also ==
- List of Major League Baseball career wins leaders
- List of Major League Baseball career losses leaders
- Quality start
- Wins above replacement
