= List of Major League Baseball wins records =

The following is a listing of pitching win and winning percentage records in Major League Baseball. All teams are considered to be members of the American or National Leagues, unless noted. Players denoted in boldface are still actively contributing to the record noted. An (r) denotes a player's rookie season.

== Top 10 career wins by league ==
American League Pitcher	Throws	Wins–losses	National League Pitcher	Throws	Wins–losses
Walter Johnson	R	417–279	Christy Mathewson	R	373–188
Roger Clemens	R	316–166	Grover Cleveland Alexander	R	373–208
Eddie Plank	L	305–183	Pud Galvin	R	349–295
Lefty Grove	L	300–141	Warren Spahn	L	363–245
Early Wynn	R	300–244	Kid Nichols	R	361–208
Red Ruffing	R	273–225	Greg Maddux	R	355–227
Mike Mussina	R	270–153	Tim Keefe	R	342–225
Jim Palmer	R	268–152	John Clarkson	R	328–178
Bob Feller	R	266–162	Steve Carlton	L	319–226
Ted Lyons	R	260–230	Mickey Welch	R	307–210

== 100 wins in two leagues ==
Pitcher	AL wins–losses	NL wins–losses
Al Orth	104–117	100–72
Cy Young	221–141	290–175
Jim Bunning	118–87	106–97
Ferguson Jenkins	115–93	169–133
Gaylord Perry	139–130	175–135
Dennis Martínez	141–115	104–78
Nolan Ryan	189–160	135–132
Kevin Brown	102–86	109–58
Randy Johnson	164–93	139–73
Pedro Martínez	117–37	102–63

== 45 wins, one season ==
Pitcher	Wins–losses	Throws	Team	Season
Old Hoss Radbourn	60–12	R	Providence Grays	1884
Albert Spalding	54–5	R	Boston Red Stockings (NA)	1875
John Clarkson	53–16	R	Chicago White Stockings	1884
Guy Hecker	52–20	R	Louisville Eclipse (AA)	1884
Albert Spalding	52–16	R	Boston Red Stockings (NA)	1874
John Clarkson	49–19	R	Boston Beaneaters	1889
Charlie Buffinton	48–16	R	Boston Beaneaters	1884
Old Hoss Radbourn	48–25	R	Providence Grays	1883
Albert Spalding	47–12	R	Chicago White Stockings	1876
John Montgomery Ward	47–19	R	Providence Grays	1879
Pud Galvin	46–29	R	Buffalo Bisons	1883
Pud Galvin	46–22	R	Buffalo Bisons	1884
Matt Kilroy	46–19	L	Baltimore Orioles (AA)	1887
George Bradley	45–19	R	St. Louis Brown Stockings	1876
Silver King	45–21	R	St. Louis Cardinals	1888
Jim McCormick	45–28	R	Cleveland Blues	1880

=== 30 wins, one season, since 1901 ===
Pitcher	Wins–losses	Throws	Team	Season
Jack Chesbro	41–12	R	New York Highlanders	1904
Ed Walsh	40–15	R	Chicago White Sox	1908
Christy Mathewson	37–11	R	New York Giants	1908
Walter Johnson	36–7	R	Washington Senators	1913
Joe McGinnity	35–8	R	New York Giants	1904
Smoky Joe Wood	34–5	R	Boston Red Sox	1912
Cy Young	33–10	R	Boston Americans	1901
Christy Mathewson	33–12	R	New York Giants	1904
Walter Johnson	33–12	R	Washington Senators	1912
Grover Cleveland Alexander	33–12	R	Philadelphia Phillies	1916
Cy Young	32–11	R	Boston Americans	1902
Lefty Grove	31–4	L	Philadelphia Athletics	1931
Denny McLain	31–6	R	Detroit Tigers	1968
Christy Mathewson	31–9	R	New York Giants	1905
Jack Coombs	31–9	R	Philadelphia Athletics	1910
Grover Cleveland Alexander	31–10	R	Philadelphia Phillies	1915
Jim Bagby	31–12	R	Cleveland Indians	1920
Joe McGinnity	31–20	R	New York Giants	1903
Dizzy Dean	30–7	R	St. Louis Cardinals	1934
Grover Cleveland Alexander	30–13	R	Philadelphia Phillies	1917
Christy Mathewson	30–13	R	New York Giants	1903

== Nine or more seasons with 20 wins ==
Pitcher	Seasons	Seasons and teams
Cy Young	15	1891–98 (Cleveland Spiders), 1899 (St. Louis Cardinals), 1901–04, 07–08 (Boston Americans/Pilgrims/Red Sox)
Christy Mathewson	13	1901, 03–14 (New York Giants)
Warren Spahn	13	1947, 49–51, 53–54, 56–61, 63 (Bos–Mil Braves)
Walter Johnson	12	1910–19, 24–25 (Washington Senators)
Kid Nichols	11	1890–99, Boston Beaneaters, 1904 (St. Louis Cardinals)
Pud Galvin	10	1879–84 (Buffalo Bisons), 1886–89 (Pittsburgh Pirates)
Charley Radbourn	9	1881–85 (Providence Grays), 1886–87, 89 (Boston Beaneaters), 1890 (Boston Reds (PL))
Grover Cleveland Alexander	9	1911, 13–17 (Philadelphia Phillies), 1920, 23 (Chicago Cubs), 1927 (St. Louis Cardinals)
Mickey Welch	9	1880–81 (Troy Trojans), 1883–89 (New York Gothams/Giants)

=== Seven or more consecutive seasons with 20 wins ===
Pitcher	Seasons	Seasons and teams
Cy Young	14	1891–98 (Cleveland Spiders), 1899-1900 (St. Louis Cardinals),1901-1904 (Boston Red Sox)
Christy Mathewson	12	1903–14 (New York Giants)
Kid Nichols	10^{1}	1890–99, Boston Beaneaters
Walter Johnson	10	1910–19 (Washington Senators)
John Clarkson	8	1883–89 (Chicago White Stockings), 1888–91 (Boston Beaneaters), 1892 (Bos Beaneaters-Cle Spiders)
Joe McGinnity	8	1899 (Baltimore Orioles (NL)), 1900 (Brooklyn Superbas), 1901 (Baltimore Orioles), 1902 (Bal Orioles–NY Giants), 1903–06 (New York Giants)
Jim McCormick	7	1879–83 (Cleveland Spiders), 1884 (Cle Spiders-Cin Outlaw Reds (UA)), 1885 (Chicago White Stockings)
Charley Radbourn	7^{1}	1881–85 (Providence Grays), 1886–87 (Boston Beaneaters)
Tim Keefe	7	1883–89 (New York Gothams/Giants)
Mickey Welch	7	1883–89 (New York Gothams/Giants)
Gus Weyhing	7	1887–90 (Philadelphia Athletics (AA)), 1890 (Brooklyn Wonders (PL)), 1891 (Philadelphia Athletics (II) (AA)), 1892–93 (Philadelphia Phillies)
Lefty Grove	7	1927–33 (Philadelphia Athletics)

== Thirteen or more seasons with 15 wins ==
Pitcher	Seasons	Seasons and teams
Cy Young	18	1891–98 (Cleveland Spiders), 1899–1900 (St. Louis Cardinals), 1901–05, 07–08 (Boston Americans/Pilgrims/Red Sox), 1909 (Cleveland Naps)
Greg Maddux	18	1988–92, 2004 (Chicago Cubs), 1993–2003 (Atlanta Braves), 2006 (Chi Cubs–LA Dodgers)
Walter Johnson	16	1910–19, 21–26 (Washington Senators)
Warren Spahn	16	1947–51, 53–63 (Boston–Milwaukee Braves)
Eddie Plank	15	1901–07, 09–14 (Philadelphia Athletics), 1915 (St. Louis Terriers (FL)), 1916 (St. Louis Browns)
Grover Cleveland Alexander	15	1911–17 (Philadelphia Phillies), 1919–23, 25 (Chicago Cubs), 1927–28 (St. Louis Cardinals)
Christy Mathewson	13	1901, 1903–14 (New York Giants)
Gaylord Perry	13	1966–71 (San Francisco Giants), 1972–74 (Cleveland Indians), 1975 (Cle Indians–Tex Rangers), 1976–77 (Texas Rangers), 1978 (San Diego Padres)
Phil Niekro	13	1969, 71–72, 74–80, 82 (Atlanta Braves), 1984–85 (New York Yankees)
Tom Seaver	13	1967–73, 75 (New York Mets), 1977 (NY Mets–Cin Reds), 1978–79 (Cincinnati Reds), 1984–85 (Chicago White Sox)

=== Ten or more consecutive seasons with 15 wins ===
Pitcher	Seasons	Seasons and teams
Greg Maddux	17	1988–92, 2004 (Chicago Cubs), 1993–2003 (Atlanta Braves)
Cy Young	15	1891–98 (Cleveland Spiders), 1899–1900 (St. Louis Cardinals), 1901–05 (Boston Americans/Pilgrims/Red Sox)
Gaylord Perry	13	1966–71 (San Francisco Giants), 1972–74 (Cleveland Indians), 1975 (Cle Indians–Tex Rangers), 1976–77 (Texas Rangers), 1978 (San Diego Padres)
Christy Mathewson	12	1903–14 (New York Giants)
Pud Galvin	11	1879–84 (Buffalo Bisons), 1885 (Buf Bisons–Pittsburgh Pirates), 1886–89 (Pittsburgh Pirates)
Warren Spahn	11	1953–63 (Boston–Milwaukee Braves)
Tim Keefe	10	1881–82 (Troy Trojans), 1883–90 (New York Metropolitans/Giants)
Walter Johnson	10	1910–19 (Washington Senators)

== League leader in wins, 5 or more seasons ==
Pitcher	Titles	Years and teams
Warren Spahn	8	1949–50, 53, 57–61 (Boston–Milwaukee Braves)
Albert Spalding	6	1871–75 (Boston Red Stockings (NA)), 1876 (Chicago White Stockings)
Grover Cleveland Alexander	6	1911, 14–17 (Philadelphia Phillies), 1920 (Chicago Cubs)
Walter Johnson	6	1913–16, 18, 24 (Washington Senators)
Bob Feller	6	1939–41, 46–47, 51 (Cleveland Indians)
Cy Young	5	1892, 95 (Cleveland Spiders), 1901–03 (Boston Americans)
Joe McGinnity	5	1899 (Baltimore Orioles), 1900 (Brooklyn Superbas), 1903–04, 06 (New York Giants)
Tom Glavine	5	1991–93, 98, 2000 (Atlanta Braves)

=== League leader in wins, 3 or more consecutive seasons ===
Pitcher	Titles	Years and teams
Albert Spalding	6	1871–75 (Boston Red Stockings (NA)), 1876 (Chicago White Stockings)
Warren Spahn	5	1957–61 (Boston–Milwaukee Braves)
Walter Johnson	4	1913–16 (Washington Senators)
Robin Roberts	4	1952–55 (Philadelphia Phillies)
Bill Hutchison	3	1890–92 (Chicago Colts)
Kid Nichols	3	1896–98 (Boston Beaneaters)
Cy Young	3	1901–03 (Boston Americans)
Grover Cleveland Alexander	3	1915–17 (Philadelphia Phillies)
Bob Feller	3	1939–41 (Cleveland Indians)
Jim Palmer	3	1975–77 (Baltimore Orioles)
Tom Glavine	3	1991–93 (Atlanta Braves)

=== League leader in wins, two leagues ===
Pitcher	League, team and year
Albert Spalding	NA: Boston Red Stockings (1871–75), NL: Chicago White Stockings (1876)
Cy Young	NL: Cleveland Spiders (1892, 95), AL: Boston Americans (1901–03)
Jack Chesbro	NL: Pittsburgh Pirates (1902), AL: New York Highlanders (1904)
Gaylord Perry	NL: San Francisco Giants (1970), San Diego Padres (1978), AL: Cleveland Indians (1972)
Ferguson Jenkins	NL: Chicago Cubs (1971), AL: Texas Rangers (1974)
Roy Halladay	AL: Toronto Blue Jays (2003), NL: Philadelphia Phillies (2010)
Max Scherzer	AL: Detroit Tigers (2013, 2014), NL: Washington Nationals (2016, 2018)

=== League leader in wins, three decades ===
Pitcher	Team and year
Bob Feller	1939–41, 46, 47, 51 (Cleveland Indians)
Warren Spahn	1949–50, 53, 57–61 (Boston–Milwaukee Braves)
Tom Seaver	1969, 75 (New York Mets), 1981 (Cincinnati Reds)

=== League leader in wins, three different teams ===
Pitcher	Team and year
Joe McGinnity	Baltimore Orioles (1899), Brooklyn Superbas (1900), New York Giants (1903–04, 06)

== 0.650 win–loss percentage, career ==
see notes^{2} ^{3}

Pitcher	Wins–losses	Winning Percentage	Years played
Albert Spalding	252–65	0.795	1871–1878
Clayton Kershaw	210–92	0.695	2008-2023
Dave Foutz	147–66	0.69014	1884–1896
Whitey Ford	236–106	0.69005	1950–1967
Bob Caruthers	218–99	0.688	1884–1893
Pedro Martínez	219–100	0.687	1992–2009
Lefty Grove	300–141	0.680	1925–1941
Larry Corcoran	177–89	0.6654	1880–1887
Christy Mathewson	373–188	0.6649	1900–1916
Max Scherzer	214-108	0.6646	2008-2023
Roy Halladay	203–105	0.659	1998–2013
Vic Raschi	132–66	0.667 (0.660)^{4}	1946–1955
Sam Leever	194–100	0.660	1898–1910
Roger Clemens	354–184	0.65799	1984–2007
Dick McBride	149–78	0.656	1871–1876
Sandy Koufax	165–87	0.6548	1955–1966
Johnny Allen	142–75	0.6544	1932–1944
Ron Guidry	170–91	0.651	1975–1988

== 0.875 winning percentage, season ==
see note^{5}

Pitcher	Winning Pct.	Wins–losses	Team	Season
Roy Face	0.947	18–1	Pittsburgh Pirates	1959
Rick Sutcliffe^{6}	0.941	16–1	Chicago Cubs	1984
Johnny Allen	0.938	15–1	Cleveland Indians	1937
Phil Regan	0.933	14–1	Los Angeles Dodgers	1966
Albert Spalding	0.915	54–5	Boston Red Caps (NA)	1875
Greg Maddux	0.905	19–2	Atlanta Braves	1995
Randy Johnson	0.900	18–2	Seattle Mariners	1995
Ron Guidry	0.893	25–3	New York Yankees	1978
Jack Manning	0.889	16–2	Boston Red Caps (NA)	1875
Freddie Fitzsimmons	0.889	16–2	Brooklyn Dodgers	1940
Lefty Grove	0.886	31–4	Philadelphia Athletics	1931
Bob Stanley	0.882	15–2	Boston Red Sox	1978
Preacher Roe	0.880	22–3	Brooklyn Dodgers	1951
Cliff Lee	0.880	22–3	Cleveland Indians	2008
Fred Goldsmith	0.875	21–3	Chicago White Stockings	1880
Deacon Phillippe	0.875	14–2	Pittsburgh Pirates	1910
Ron Davis	0.875	14–2	New York Yankees	1979 **(r)**
Max Scherzer	0.875	21–3	Detroit Tigers	2013
Clayton Kershaw	0.875	21–3	Los Angeles Dodgers	2014
Tom Seaver	0.875	14–2	Cincinnati Reds	1981

== Notes ==
1. Nichols' and Radbourn's streaks date from the start of their careers; the only pitchers to start their careers with streaks of seven consecutive seasons of 20 wins.
2. Winning percentage is generally computed to the thousandths place. When necessary, the percentage is computed to greater precision to establish a true order.
3. Minimum of 200 decisions (wins + losses).
4. Vic Rasci's record of 132–66 (0.667) does not meet the minimum number of decisions to qualify for this list; however, when he is credited with two additional losses, his percentage drops to 0.660, which still qualifies him for this listing.
5. Minimum of 15 decisions.
6. Sutcliffe started the 1984 season with a record 4–5 with the Cleveland Indians of the American League before being traded to the Cubs.
