= List of Major League Baseball single-season losses leaders =

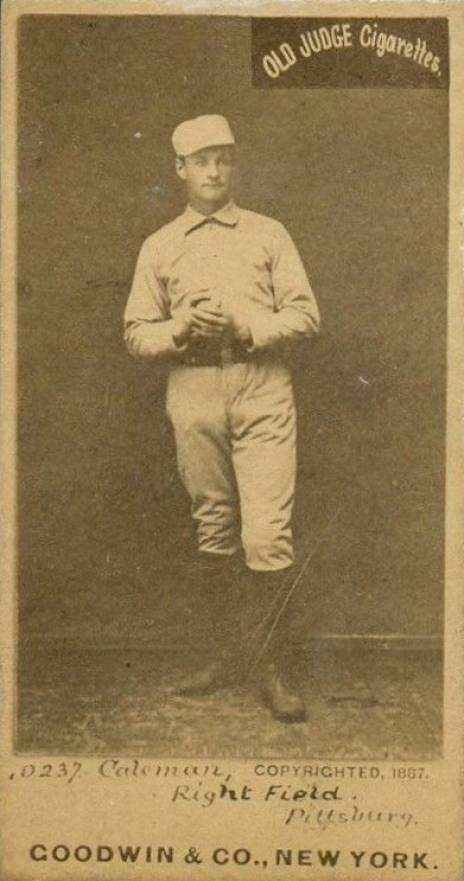
John Coleman, the single-season leader in losses.

In the sport of baseball, a loss is a statistic credited to the pitcher of the losing team who allows the run that gives the opposing team the lead with which the game is won (the go-ahead run). The losing pitcher is the pitcher who allows the go-ahead run to reach base for a lead that the winning team never relinquishes. If a pitcher allows a run which gives the opposing team the lead, his team comes back to lead or tie the game, and then the opposing team regains the lead against a subsequent pitcher, the earlier pitcher does not get the loss.

John Coleman holds the record for most losses in a single season, losing 48 games in 1883. Will White (42 in 1880), Larry McKeon (41 in 1884), George Bradley (40 in 1879), and Jim McCormick (40 in 1879) are the only other pitchers to lose more than 40 games in a single season. There has been 50 instances of a pitcher losing more than 30 games in a season, all taking place during the 19th century.

== Key ==
| Rank | Rank amongst leaders in single-season wins. A blank field indicates a tie. |
| Player | Name of player. |
| L | Total single-season losses. |
| Year | Season losses were recorded. |
| * | Denotes elected to National Baseball Hall of Fame. |

== List ==
| Rank | Player | L | Year |
|---|---|---|---|
| 1 | John Coleman | 48 | 1883 |
| 2 | Will White | 42 | 1880 |
| 3 | Larry McKeon | 41 | 1884 |
| 4 | George Bradley | 40 | 1879 |
| | Jim McCormick | 40 | 1879 |
| 6 | Kid Carsey | 37 | 1891 |
| | George Cobb | 37 | 1892 |
| | Henry Porter | 37 | 1888 |
| 9 | Bill Hutchison | 36 | 1892 |
| | Stump Weidman | 36 | 1886 |
| 11 | Jim Devlin | 35 | 1876 |
| | Red Donahue | 35 | 1897 |
| | Pud Galvin * | 35 | 1880 |
| | Hardie Henderson | 35 | 1885 |
| | Fleury Sullivan | 35 | 1884 |
| | Adonis Terry | 35 | 1884 |
| 17 | Mark Baldwin | 34 | 1889 |
| | Bob Barr | 34 | 1884 |
| | Matt Kilroy | 34 | 1886 |
| | Bobby Mathews | 34 | 1876 |
| | Al Mays | 34 | 1887 |
| | Amos Rusie * | 34 | 1890 |
| 23 | Jersey Bakley | 33 | 1888 |
| | Hardie Henderson | 33 | 1883 |
| | Harry McCormick | 33 | 1879 |
| | Frank Mountain | 33 | 1883 |
| | Lee Richmond | 33 | 1882 |
| | Dupee Shaw | 33 | 1884 |
| | Jim Whitney | 33 | 1881 |
| 30 | John Harkins | 32 | 1884 |
| | Lee Richmond | 32 | 1880 |
| | Jim Whitney | 32 | 1885 |
| | Jim Whitney | 32 | 1886 |
| 34 | Billy Crowell | 31 | 1887 |
| | Charles Radbourn * | 31 | 1886 |
| | Amos Rusie | 31 | 1892 |

| Rank | Player | L | Year |
|---|---|---|---|
| | Dupee Shaw | 31 | 1886 |
| | Sam Weaver | 31 | 1878 |
| | Will White | 31 | 1879 |
| 40 | Jersey Bakley | 30 | 1884 |
| | Ed Beatin | 30 | 1890 |
| | Ted Breitenstein | 30 | 1895 |
| | John Ewing | 30 | 1889 |
| | Jim Hughey | 30 | 1899 |
| | Jack Lynch | 30 | 1886 |
| | Jim McCormick | 30 | 1881 |
| | Jim McCormick | 30 | 1882 |
| | Toad Ramsey | 30 | 1888 |
| | Phenomenal Smith | 30 | 1887 |
| | Mickey Welch * | 30 | 1880 |
| 51 | Tommy Bond | 29 | 1880 |
| | Bert Cunningham | 29 | 1888 |
| | Red Ehret | 29 | 1889 |
| | Pud Galvin * | 29 | 1883 |
| | Bill Hart | 29 | 1896 |
| | Egyptian Healy | 29 | 1887 |
| | Silver King | 29 | 1891 |
| | Doc Landis | 29 | 1882 |
| | Hank O'Day * | 29 | 1888 |
| | Jack Taylor | 29 | 1898 |
| | Vic Willis * | 29 | 1905 |
| 62 | Mark Baldwin | 28 | 1891 |
| | Hugh Daily | 28 | 1884 |
| | Duke Esper | 28 | 1893 |
| | Bill Hill | 28 | 1896 |
| | Jim McCormick | 28 | 1880 |
| | Hank O'Day * | 28 | 1884 |
| | Gus Weyhing | 28 | 1887 |
| 69 | Mark Baldwin | 27 | 1892 |
| | George Bell | 27 | 1910 |
| | Charlie Buffinton | 27 | 1885 |
| | Bill Carrick | 27 | 1899 |

| Rank | Player | L | Year |
|---|---|---|---|
| | Paul Derringer | 27 | 1933 |
| | Chick Fraser | 27 | 1896 |
| | Pud Galvin * | 27 | 1879 |
| | Bill Hart | 27 | 1897 |
| | Pink Hawley | 27 | 1894 |
| | Tim Keefe * | 27 | 1881 |
| | Tim Keefe * | 27 | 1883 |
| | Phil Knell | 27 | 1891 |
| | Al Mays | 27 | 1886 |
| | Tony Mullane | 27 | 1886 |
| | Toad Ramsey | 27 | 1886 |
| | Toad Ramsey | 27 | 1887 |
| | Willie Sudhoff | 27 | 1898 |
| | Parke Swartzel | 27 | 1889 |
| | Dummy Taylor | 27 | 1901 |
| 88 | Al Atkinson | 26 | 1884 |
| | Ted Breitenstein | 26 | 1896 |
| | Dory Dean | 26 | 1876 |
| | George Derby | 26 | 1881 |
| | Gus Dorner | 26 | 1906 |
| | Pud Galvin * | 26 | 1885 |
| | Bob Groom | 26 | 1909 |
| | George Haddock | 26 | 1890 |
| | Tim Keefe * | 26 | 1882 |
| | Frank Killen | 26 | 1892 |
| | John Kirby | 26 | 1886 |
| | Terry Larkin | 26 | 1878 |
| | Tony Mullane | 26 | 1884 |
| | Tony Mullane | 26 | 1891 |
| | Jack Neagle | 26 | 1884 |
| | Lee Richmond | 26 | 1881 |
| | Dupee Shaw | 26 | 1885 |
| | Harry Staley | 26 | 1889 |
| | Happy Townsend | 26 | 1904 |
| | Gus Weyhing | 26 | 1898 |

== See also ==
- Baseball statistics
- List of Major League Baseball career losses leaders
