= List of Major League Baseball career records =

In Major League Baseball (MLB), records play an integral part in evaluating a player's impact on the sport. Holding a career record almost guarantees a player eventual entry into the Baseball Hall of Fame because it represents both longevity and consistency over a long period of time.

== Batting records (1875–present) ==
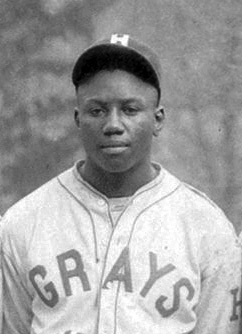
Josh Gibson, who played 638 games in the Negro Leagues, holds the record for highest batting average, slugging percentage, and on-base plus slugging in a career.

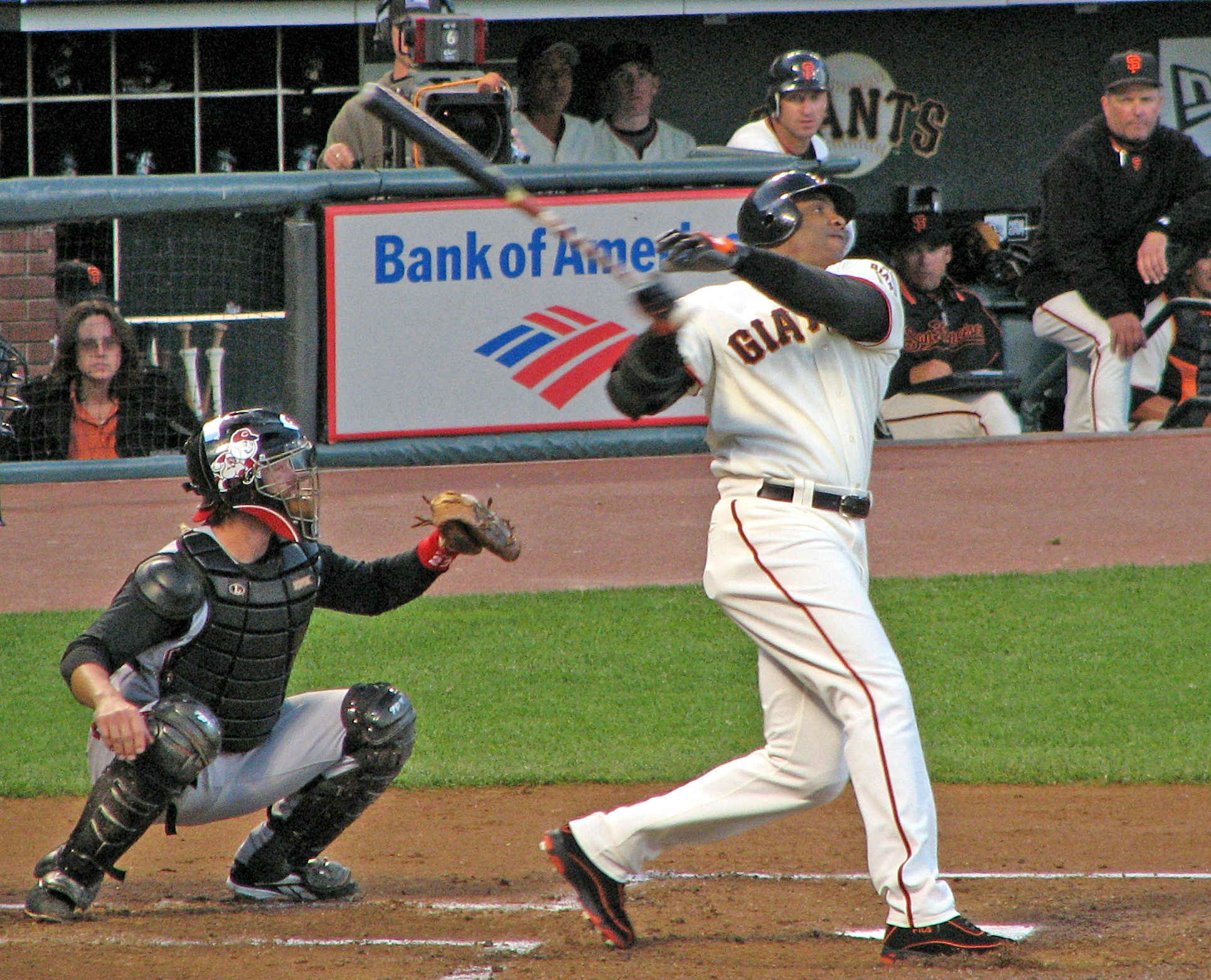
Barry Bonds holds the career home run and single-season home run records.

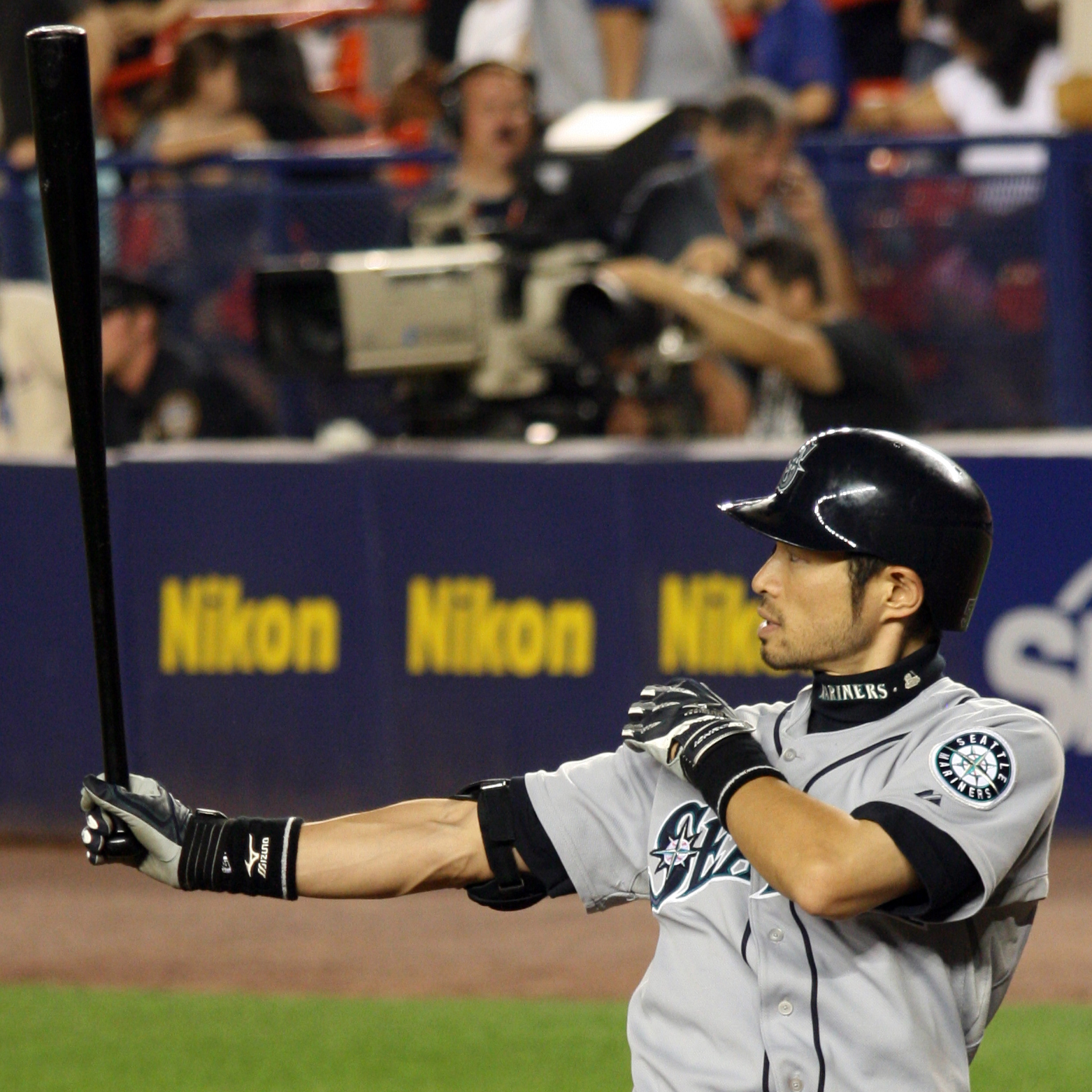
Ichiro Suzuki collected 262 hits in 2004, breaking George Sisler's 84-year-old record for most hits in a season.

Record	Player	#	Refs
Highest batting average	Josh Gibson	.372	
Most singles	Pete Rose	3,215	
Most doubles	Tris Speaker	792	
Most triples	Sam Crawford	309	
Most home runs	Barry Bonds	762	
Most grand slams	Alex Rodriguez	25	
Most home runs by a pitcher	Wes Ferrell	37	
Most grand slams by a pitcher	shared by Madison Bumgarner and Tony Cloninger	2	
Oldest player to hit first home run	Bartolo Colón	42 years, 349 days old	
Youngest player to hit a home run	Tommy Brown	17 years, 257 days old	
Most runs batted in	Hank Aaron	2,297	
Most hits	Pete Rose	4,256	
Most runs scored	Rickey Henderson	2,295	
Highest on-base percentage	Ted Williams	.482	
Most stolen bases	Rickey Henderson	1,406	
Most steals of home	Ty Cobb	54	
Highest slugging percentage	Josh Gibson	.718	
Highest on-base plus slugging	Josh Gibson	1.177	
Most five hit games	Ty Cobb	14	
Most four hit games	Ty Cobb	87	
Most three hit games	Ty Cobb	399	
Most two hit games	Pete Rose	1,225	
Most one hit games	Pete Rose	2,561	
Most walks	Barry Bonds	2,558	
Most intentional walks	Barry Bonds	688	
Most strikeouts	Reggie Jackson	2,597	
Most at-bats	Pete Rose	14,555	
Most total bases	Hank Aaron	6,856	
Most runs created	Barry Bonds	2,892	
Most games played	Pete Rose	3,562	

== Pitching records (1876–present) ==
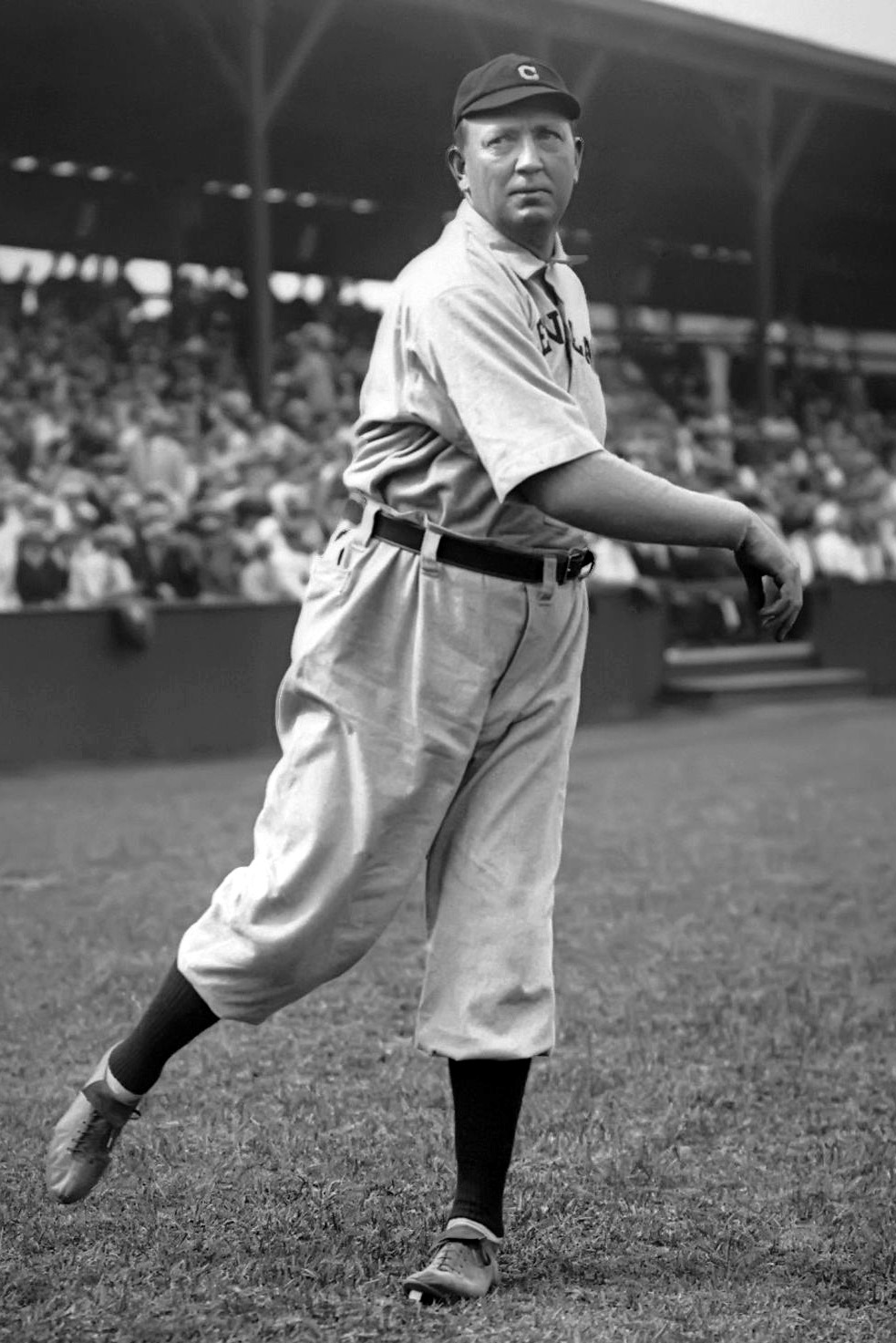
Cy Young, the Major League record holder for most career wins, losses, innings pitched, and complete games.

Record	Player	#
Most wins	Cy Young	511
Most losses	Cy Young	316
Most no-hitters	Nolan Ryan	7
Most strikeouts	Nolan Ryan	5,714
Most shutouts	Walter Johnson	110
Most starts	Cy Young	815
Most pickoffs	Steve Carlton	144
Most innings pitched	Cy Young	7,354 2/3
Most hit batsmen	Gus Weyhing	278
Most home runs allowed	Jamie Moyer	522
Most complete games	Cy Young	749
Lowest earned-run average	Ed Walsh	1.82
Lowest walks plus hits per inning pitched	Addie Joss	.968
Most saves	Mariano Rivera	652
Highest win–loss percentage	Spud Chandler	71.7%
Most games	Jesse Orosco	1,252
Most consecutive scoreless innings pitched	Orel Hershiser	59 (Note: Even though Hershiser's 59 consecutive scoreless innings occurred completely within the 1988 season, other pitchers have had streaks spanning more than one season. Thus, it is necessary to put the record over a career.)

=== Live-ball era (1920–present) ===
(if different from overall records)

Record	Player	#
Most wins	Warren Spahn	363
Most losses	Nolan Ryan	292
Lowest earned-run average	Mariano Rivera	2.21
Most shutouts	Warren Spahn	63
Most innings pitched	Phil Niekro	5,404 1/3
Most complete games	Warren Spahn	382
Lowest Walks plus hits per inning pitched	Mariano Rivera	1.000

== Catcher records ==
- Most runners caught stealing: 810, Deacon McGuire
- Most stolen bases allowed: 1,498, Deacon McGuire
- Most stolen base attempts: 2,308, Deacon McGuire
- Highest caught stealing %: 57.40%, Roy Campanella
- Most games caught: 2,427, Iván Rodríguez
- Most caught no hitters: 4, Jason Varitek, May 19, 2008 and Carlos Ruiz, July 25, 2015.

== Other records ==
- Most World Series wins (as a player/coach/manager/executive): 17, Frankie Crosetti
- Most World Series wins (as a player): 10, Yogi Berra
- Most World Series wins (as a manager): 7, Casey Stengel, Joe McCarthy
- Most consecutive World Series wins (as a manager): 5, Casey Stengel
- Most pennants won: 10, Casey Stengel, John McGraw
- Most World Series appearances (as a manager): 10, Casey Stengel
- Most World Series appearances (as a team): 40, New York Yankees
- Most World Series titles (as a team): 27, New York Yankees
- Most MVP Awards won: 7, Barry Bonds
- Most consecutive games played: 2,632, Cal Ripken Jr.

== See also ==
- List of Major League Baseball single-game records
- List of Major League Baseball single-season records
- List of Major League Baseball records considered unbreakable
