= List of Major League Baseball career bases on balls allowed leaders =

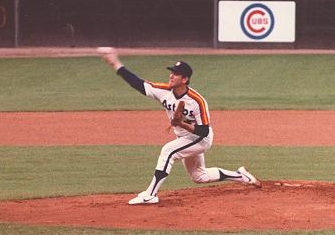
Nolan Ryan, the all-time leader in batters walked.

A base on balls (BB), also known as a walk, occurs in baseball when a batter receives four pitches that the umpire calls balls, and is in turn awarded first base without the possibility of being called out. The base on balls is defined in Section 2.00 of baseball's Official Rules, and further detail is given in 6.08(a). It is, however, considered a faux pas for a professional player to actually walk to first base; the batter-runner and any advancing runners normally jog on such a play.

This is a list of top 100 Major League Baseball pitchers who have allowed the most walks of all time. Nolan Ryan holds the record for walking the most batters in a career with 2,795. Ryan is the only pitcher in MLB history to walk more than 2,000 batters.

== Key ==
Rank	Rank amongst leaders in career walks. A blank field indicates a tie.
Player	Name of player.
BB	Total career batters walked.
*	Denotes elected to National Baseball Hall of Fame.

== List ==
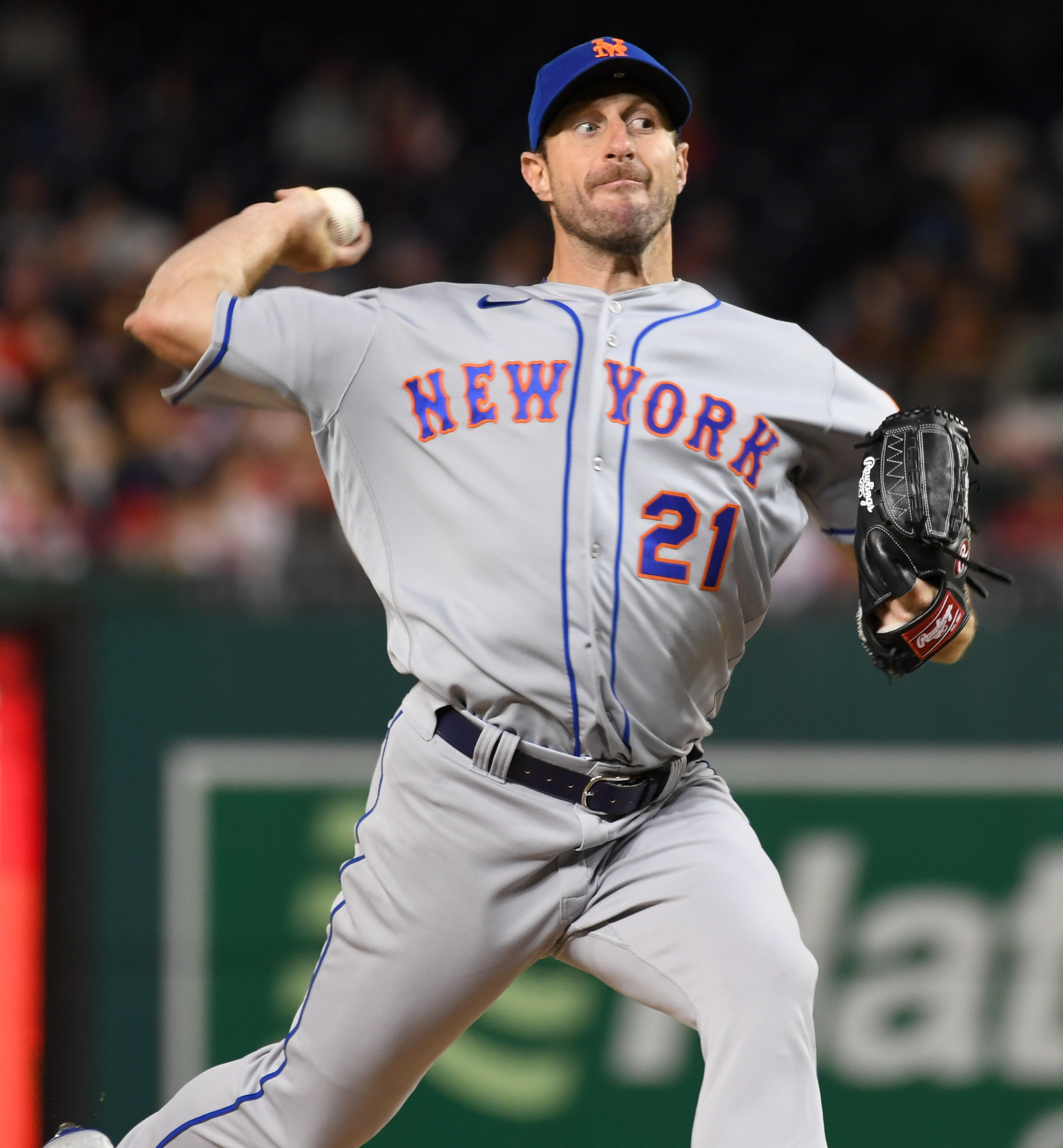
Max Scherzer, the active leader, is 245th all-time in career batters walked with 814.

- Stats updated as of September 27, 2026.

Rank	Player	BB
1	Nolan Ryan*	2,795
2	Steve Carlton*	1,833
3	Phil Niekro*	1,809
4	Early Wynn*	1,775
5	Bob Feller*	1,764
6	Bobo Newsom	1,732
7	Amos Rusie*	1,707
8	Charlie Hough	1,665
9	Roger Clemens	1,580
10	Gus Weyhing	1,570
11	Red Ruffing*	1,541
12	Tom Glavine*	1,500
13	Randy Johnson*	1,497
14	Bump Hadley	1,442
15	Warren Spahn*	1,434
16	Earl Whitehill	1,431
17	Tony Mullane	1,408
18	Sad Sam Jones	1,396
19	Jack Morris*	1,390
	Tom Seaver*	1,390
21	Gaylord Perry*	1,379
22	Bobby Witt	1,375
23	Mike Torrez	1,371
24	Walter Johnson*	1,363
25	Don Sutton*	1,343
26	Chick Fraser	1,338
27	Bob Gibson*	1,336
28	Chuck Finley	1,332
29	Bert Blyleven*	1,322
30	Sam McDowell	1,312
31	Jim Palmer*	1,311
32	Mark Baldwin	1,307
33	Adonis Terry	1,298
34	Mickey Welch*	1,297
35	Burleigh Grimes*	1,295
36	Mark Langston	1,289
37	Kid Nichols*	1,272
38	Bullet Joe Bush	1,263
39	Joe Niekro	1,262
40	Allie Reynolds	1,261
41	Tommy John	1,259
42	Frank Tanana	1,255
43	Bob Lemon*	1,251
44	Hal Newhouser*	1,249
45	George Mullin	1,238
46	Tim Keefe*	1,233
47	Cy Young*	1,217
48	Red Faber*	1,213
49	Vic Willis*	1,212
50	Ted Breitenstein	1,207

Rank	Player	BB
51	Tim Wakefield	1,205
52	Brickyard Kennedy	1,203
53	Jerry Koosman	1,198
54	Tommy Bridges	1,192
55	John Clarkson*	1,191
56	Lefty Grove*	1,187
57	Vida Blue	1,185
58	Billy Pierce	1,178
59	Kenny Rogers	1,175
60	Dennis Martínez	1,165
61	Al Leiter	1,163
62	Mike Moore	1,156
63	Jamie Moyer	1,155
	Jack Stivetts	1,155
65	Fernando Valenzuela	1,151
66	David Cone	1,137
67	Bill Hutchison	1,132
	Johnny Vander Meer	1,132
69	Jerry Reuss	1,127
70	Ted Lyons*	1,121
	Bucky Walters	1,121
72	Mel Harder	1,118
73	Earl Moore	1,108
74	Bob Buhl	1,105
75	Luis Tiant	1,104
76	A. J. Burnett	1,100
77	Mickey Lolich	1,099
	CC Sabathia*	1,099
79	Lefty Gomez*	1,095
80	Virgil Trucks	1,088
81	Whitey Ford*	1,086
82	Jim Kaat*	1,083
83	Eppa Rixey*	1,082
84	Rick Sutcliffe	1,081
85	Eddie Plank*	1,072
86	Ryan Dempster	1,071
87	Camilo Pascual	1,069
88	Bob Turley	1,068
89	Hooks Dauss	1,067
90	Liván Hernández	1,066
91	Ice Box Chamberlain	1,065
92	Bert Cunningham	1,064
	Barry Zito	1,064
94	Curt Simmons	1,063
95	Bill Donovan	1,059
96	Murry Dickson	1,058
97	Jouett Meekin	1,056
98	Vern Kennedy	1,049
99	Dizzy Trout	1,046
100	Howard Ehmke	1,042

== See also ==
- List of Major League Baseball career hit batsmen leaders
