= List of Major League Baseball career batters faced leaders =

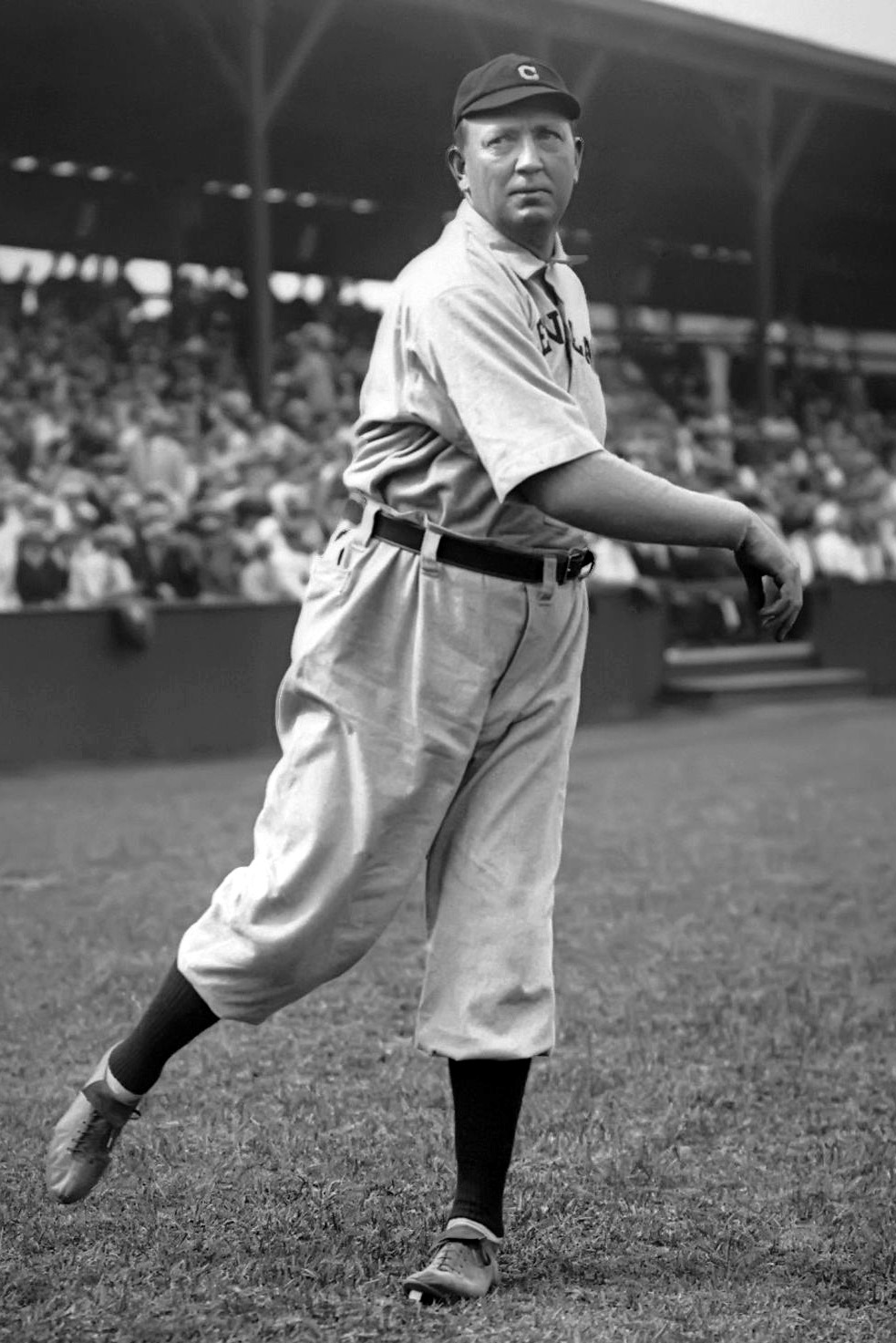
Cy Young, the all-time leader in career batters faced.

In baseball statistics, Batters Faced (BF), also known as Total Batters Faced (TBF), is the number of batters who made a plate appearance before the pitcher in a game or in a season. This is a list of the top 100 leaders.

Cy Young is the all-time leader, facing 29,565 batters in his career. Young is the only player to face more than 26,000 career batters. Pud Galvin is second having faced 25,415 batters, and is the only other player to have faced more than 25,000 batters. A total of 17 players have faced over 20,000 batters in their careers, with all but two (Bobby Mathews and Roger Clemens) being in the Baseball Hall of Fame.

== Key ==
Rank	Rank amongst leaders in career batters faced. A blank field indicates a tie.
Player	Name of player.
BF	Total career batters faced. Current total in parentheses ()
*	Denotes elected to National Baseball Hall of Fame.
	Denotes active player

== List ==
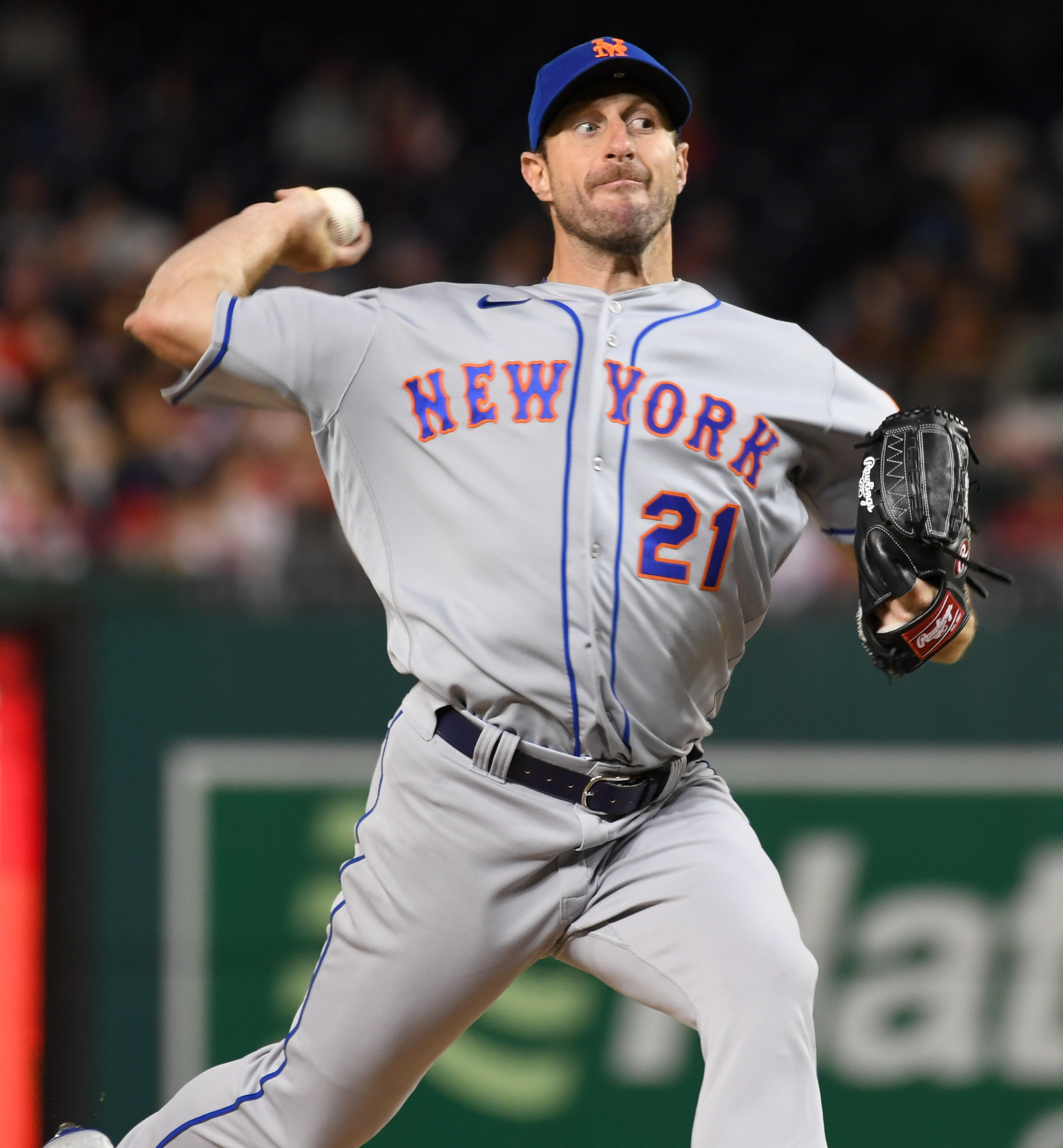
Max Scherzer, the active leader in career batters faced and 151st all-time.

- Stats updated as of 2026 season.

Rank	Player (2027 BF)	BF
1	Cy Young*	29,565
2	Pud Galvin*	25,415
3	Walter Johnson*	23,405
4	Phil Niekro*	22,677
5	Nolan Ryan*	22,575
6	Bobby Mathews	21,977
7	Gaylord Perry*	21,953
8	Steve Carlton*	21,683
9	Don Sutton*	21,631
10	Warren Spahn*	21,547
11	Kid Nichols*	21,082
12	Tim Keefe*	20,941
13	Grover Cleveland Alexander*	20,893
14	Bert Blyleven*	20,491
15	Greg Maddux*	20,421
16	Mickey Welch*	20,308
17	Roger Clemens	20,240
18	Tommy John	19,692
19	Early Wynn*	19,408
20	Tony Mullane	19,407
21	Tom Seaver*	19,369
22	Gus Weyhing	19,188
23	Robin Roberts*	19,174
24	John Clarkson*	19,146
25	Jim Kaat*	19,023
26	Charles Radbourn*	18,918
27	Christy Mathewson*	18,913
28	Eppa Rixey*	18,754
29	Tom Glavine*	18,604
30	Red Ruffing*	18,546
31	Ferguson Jenkins*	18,400
32	Burleigh Grimes*	17,974
33	Jack Powell	17,896
34	Eddie Plank*	17,803
35	Ted Lyons*	17,797
36	Jim McCormick	17,702
37	Frank Tanana	17,641
38	Jamie Moyer	17,356
39	Red Faber*	17,104
40	Randy Johnson*	17,067
41	Dennis Martínez	16,754
42	Sad Sam Jones	16,662
43	Lefty Grove*	16,622
44	Bobo Newsom	16,467
45	Jack Quinn	16,356
46	Amos Rusie	16,313
47	Vic Willis*	16,263
48	Bob Feller*	16,180
49	Charlie Hough	16,170
50	Jack Morris*	16,120

Rank	Player (2027 BF)	BF
51	Jim Palmer*	16,114
52	Bob Gibson*	16,068
53	Waite Hoyt*	16,010
54	Jerry Koosman	15,996
55	Earl Whitehill	15,781
56	Jim Bunning*	15,618
57	Jerry Reuss	15,582
58	Adonis Terry	15,413
59	Paul Derringer	15,391
60	Bob Friend	15,214
61	George Mullin	15,179
62	Joe Niekro	15,166
63	Mickey Lolich	15,140
64	Herb Pennock*	15,096
65	Tommy Bond	15,082
66	CC Sabathia*	14,989
67	Will White	14,951
68	Rick Reuschel	14,888
69	Mel Harder	14,861
70	Carl Hubbell*	14,805
71	Jim Whitney	14,666
72	Bartolo Colón	14,655
73	Justin Verlander	14,646
74	Mike Mussina*	14,593
75	Chick Fraser	14,553
76	Charlie Buffinton	14,465
77	Claude Osteen	14,433
78	David Wells	14,413
79	Wilbur Cooper	14,377
80	Luis Tiant	14,365
81	Clark Griffith*	14,335
82	Kenny Rogers	14,280
83	John Smoltz*	14,271
84	Juan Marichal*	14,236
85	Hooks Dauss	14,192
86	Doyle Alexander	14,162
87	Curt Simmons	14,144
88	Joe McGinnity*	14,132
89	Don Drysdale*	14,097
90	Andy Pettitte	14,074
91	Catfish Hunter*	14,032
92	Tim Wakefield	13,939
93	Zack Greinke	13,877
94	Billy Pierce	13,853
95	Vida Blue	13,837
	Al Orth	13,837
97	Liván Hernández	13,816
98	Jim Perry	13,732
99	Mark Buehrle	13,705
100	Silver King	13,671
