= List of Major League Baseball career losses leaders =

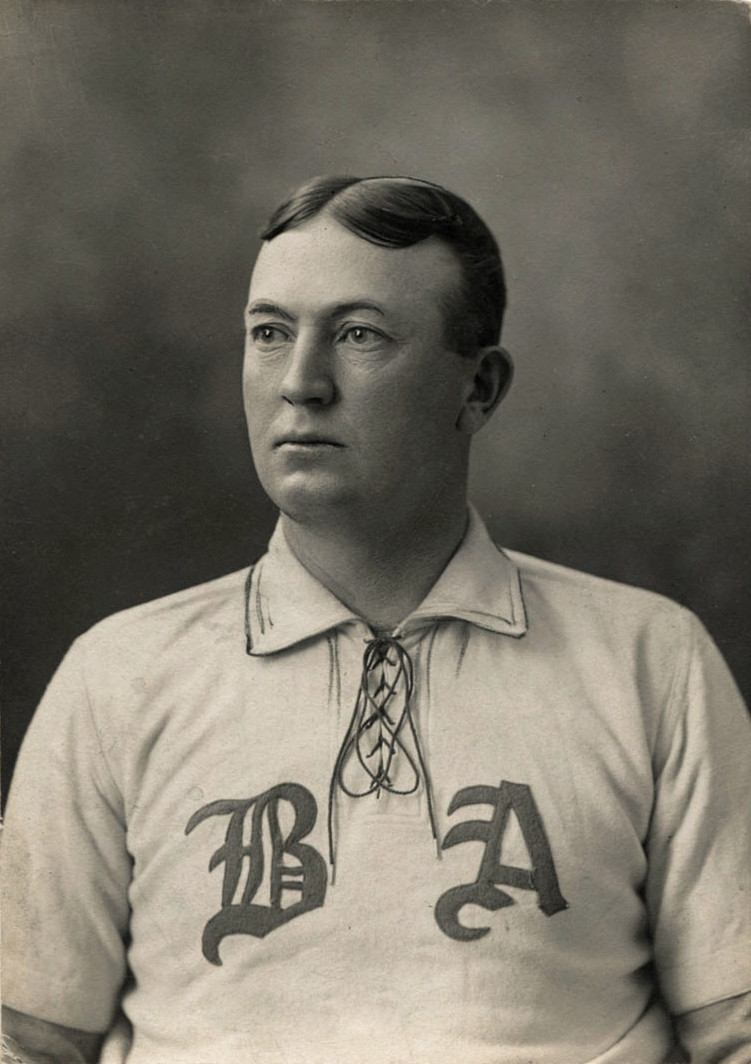
Cy Young, the all-time leader in games lost.

In the sport of baseball, a loss is a statistic credited to the pitcher of the losing team responsible for the run that gives the opposing team the lead with which the game is won (the go-ahead run). The losing pitcher is the pitcher responsible for the go-ahead run to reach base for a lead that the winning team never relinquishes. If a pitcher allows a run that gives the opposing team the lead, his team comes back to lead or tie the game, and then the opposing team regains the lead against a subsequent pitcher, the earlier pitcher does not get the loss.

Cy Young holds the MLB loss record with 316; Pud Galvin is second with 308. Young and Galvin are the only players to earn 300 or more losses.

== Key ==
Rank	Rank amongst leaders in career games lost. A blank field indicates a tie.
Player	Name of player.
L	Total career games lost
*	Denotes elected to National Baseball Hall of Fame.

== List ==
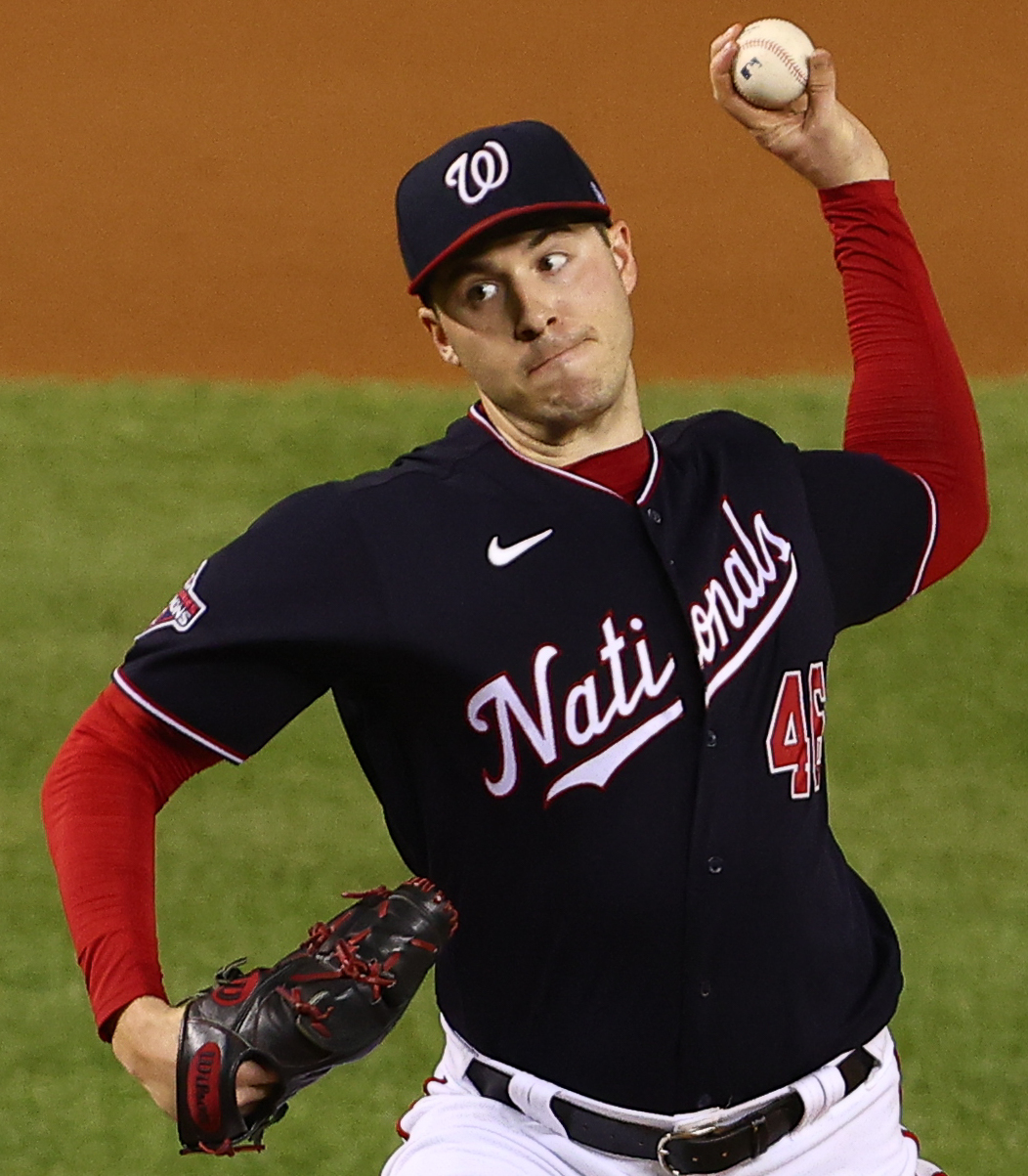
Patrick Corbin, the active leader, is tied for 181st all-time in career losses with 146.

- Stats updated as of September 27, 2026.

Rank	Player	L
1	Cy Young*	316
2	Pud Galvin*	308
3	Nolan Ryan*	292
4	Walter Johnson*	279
5	Phil Niekro*	274
6	Gaylord Perry*	265
7	Don Sutton*	256
8	Jack Powell	254
9	Eppa Rixey*	251
10	Bert Blyleven*	250
11	Bobby Mathews	248
12	Robin Roberts*	245
	Warren Spahn*	245
14	Steve Carlton*	244
	Early Wynn*	244
16	Jim Kaat*	237
17	Frank Tanana	236
18	Gus Weyhing	232
19	Tommy John	231
20	Bob Friend	230
	Ted Lyons*	230
22	Greg Maddux*	227
23	Ferguson Jenkins*	226
24	Tim Keefe*	225
	Red Ruffing*	225
26	Bobo Newsom	222
27	Tony Mullane	220
28	Jack Quinn	218
29	Sad Sam Jones	217
30	Charlie Hough	216
31	Jim McCormick	214
32	Red Faber*	213
33	Paul Derringer	212
	Chick Fraser	212
	Burleigh Grimes*	212
36	Mickey Welch*	210
37	Jerry Koosman	209
	Jamie Moyer	209
39	Grover Cleveland Alexander*	208
	Kid Nichols*	208
41	Tom Seaver*	205
	Vic Willis*	205
43	Joe Niekro	204
	Jim Whitney	204
45	Tom Glavine*	203
46	George Mullin	196
	Adonis Terry	196
48	Claude Osteen	195
49	Eddie Plank*	194
	Charles Radbourn*	194

Rank	Player	L
51	Dennis Martínez	193
52	Mickey Lolich	191
	Rick Reuschel	191
	Jerry Reuss	191
	Tom Zachary	191
56	Al Orth	189
57	Bartolo Colón	188
	Christy Mathewson*	188
59	Mel Harder	186
	Mike Morgan	186
	Jack Morris*	186
62	Earl Whitehill	185
63	Jim Bunning*	184
	Bullet Joe Bush	184
	Roger Clemens	184
66	Larry Jackson	183
	Curt Simmons	183
68	Danny Darwin	182
	Hooks Dauss	182
	Waite Hoyt*	182
71	Murry Dickson	181
	Dutch Leonard	181
	Rick Wise	181
74	Lee Meadows	180
	Tim Wakefield	180
76	Pink Hawley	179
	Dolf Luque	179
78	John Clarkson*	178
	Wilbur Cooper	178
80	Bill Dinneen	177
	Liván Hernández	177
	Rube Marquard*	177
83	Mike Moore	176
84	Red Donahue	175
85	Doyle Alexander	174
	Bob Gibson*	174
	Tom Hughes	174
	Jim Perry	174
	Amos Rusie*	174
90	Chuck Finley	173
91	Luis Tiant	172
92	Dennis Eckersley*	171
	Larry French	171
94	Ted Breitenstein	170
	Camilo Pascual	170
96	Billy Pierce	169
97	Red Ames	167
	Jim Clancy	167
	Bert Cunningham	167
	Red Ehret	167

== See also ==
- Baseball statistics
- List of Major League Baseball career wins leaders
- List of Major League Baseball career games started leaders
- List of Major League Baseball career games finished leaders
