= Live-ball era =

MLB 1920 rule changes that increased offensive production

Historical Major League Baseball slugging average and contributions to slugging average from (top to bottom) home runs, triples, doubles, and singles; the variant shaded era is the "dead-ball" era, 1900–1918, with the "live-ball" era following.

The live-ball era, also referred to as the lively ball era, is the period in Major League Baseball since 1920. It contrasts with the pre-1920 period known as the "dead-ball era". The name "live-ball era" comes from the dramatic rise in offensive statistics, a direct result of a series of rule changes (introduced in 1920) that were colloquially said to have made the ball more "lively". Upon entering the live-ball era, baseball regained relevance and exploded in popularity.

== Dead-ball era (pre-1920) ==
Prior to the rule changes in 1920, the same ball would often be used throughout an entire game, being replaced only if it began to unravel. Pitchers were also allowed to deface or scuff the ball, apply foreign substances to it (such as dirt or spit), and cut into the ball with an emery board. Balls would not even be replaced after a foul ball or home run, with fans instead throwing the ball back onto the field to be re-used. As a result, the ball would become increasingly dirty and worn as the game progressed, making it difficult to see and making its movement erratic. Furthermore, the physical wear on the ball reduced its elasticity as the game progressed, making it increasingly difficult to hit for distance. These factors ultimately gave pitchers a major advantage over batters, resulting in low-scoring games.

There were also rules in force prior to 1920 that contributed to the low-scoring games. In 1901, the National League adopted the "foul-strike rule," which counted foul balls as strikes. Before this rule, batters could safely swing at many marginal pitches, which not only tired out the pitcher but also allowed for more hits because a "flukey" hit could land in play. With the introduction of the foul-strike rule, the batter had to let many more pitches "go" without being swung on, dramatically reducing the total number of hits. The American League followed suit in 1903, making the rule universal.

== Rule changes ==
Rather than change the construction of the balls, which remained consistent between the transition from the "dead-" to "live-ball eras", rule changes were instituted around how the balls were treated. Starting in 1920, balls were replaced at the first sign of wear, resulting in a ball that was much brighter and easier for a hitter to see. Additionally, pitchers were no longer allowed to deface, scuff, or apply foreign substances to the ball, but 17 pitchers who mostly threw the spitball were allowed to throw it until they retired. The last one to legally throw it was Burleigh Grimes on September 20, 1934.

=== Impact of 1920 rule changes ===
The impact of the rule changes was felt almost immediately. In 1920, the game changed from typically low-scoring to high-scoring games, with a newfound reliance on the home run. That year, Babe Ruth set a record for slugging percentage and hit 54 home runs (smashing his old record of 29). Aiding in Ruth's success was that he held the bat lower and swung with an uppercut, essentially trying to hit home runs. His 54 home runs in 1920 were a total greater than 14 of the other 15 teams at the time, and it nearly tripled fellow slugger George Sisler's second-highest total of 19 that season. Seeing his success (and his popularity that followed), young players who debuted in the 1920s, including Lou Gehrig and Mel Ott, followed Ruth's example. The home run has been a significant part of baseball since. Ruth broke his own record in 1921, hitting 59 home runs; six years later, he passed his own mark once again by hitting 60 home runs, a single-season record that stood for 34 years.

While the rule changes instituted in 1920 were a major factor in the increased scoring and number of home runs seen in Major League Baseball, established sluggers who had been successful prior to 1920 (including Sisler, Ty Cobb and Tris Speaker) were able to maintain their previous successful hitting styles into the 1920s. Such success is attributed to Sisler (and others) choking up on the bat, resulting in fewer strikeouts and more doubles. In 1920, George Sisler also set his long-standing record of 257 hits in a single season, which would not be eclipsed until 84 years later in 2004 when the Seattle Mariners' Ichiro Suzuki hit 262.

The live-ball era also had a lasting impact on pitchers. Between 1910 and 1920, the last decade of the dead-ball era, eight pitchers had 30-win seasons. Since the beginning of the 1921 season, the first full season of the live-ball era, only three pitchers have had 30-win seasons: Lefty Grove in 1931; Dizzy Dean in 1934; and Denny McLain in 1968.
