= 1894 Cincinnati Reds season =

1894 Cincinnati Reds
- League: National League
- Ballpark: League Park
- City: Cincinnati, Ohio
- Record: 55–75 (.423)
- League place: 10th
- Owners: John T. Brush
- Managers: Charlie Comiskey

In 1894, the Cincinnati Reds finished in tenth place in the National League with a record of 55–75, 35 games behind the Baltimore Orioles.

== Regular season ==
After a somewhat disappointing 1893 season, in which the Reds had a 65–63 record to finish in sixth place, the club was hoping to rebound in 1894. Player-manager Charles Comiskey would return to manage the team for a third season. During the off-season, the Reds acquired outfielder Dummy Hoy from the Washington Senators in a trade. Hoy had batted .245 with no home runs, 45 RBI, and 48 stolen bases with the Senators in 1893. Hoy led the National League in stolen bases with 82 while with the Washington Nationals in 1888.

Bug Holliday had a huge season for the Reds, hitting a team high .376 with a team record 123 RBI. He also hit thirteen home runs, which tied him with Jim Canavan, and had 126 runs. Canavan batted .275 and had 74 RBI to go with his thirteen homers. Hoy batted .304 with five home runs and 71 RBI while scoring 118 runs in his first season with Cincinnati. Bid McPhee hit .313 with five home runs and 93 RBI, while Arlie Latham also batted .313, hitting four home runs and collecting 60 RBI while stealing a team-high 62 bases.

The Reds pitching staff struggled, as they had the worst ERA in the league at 5.99. Frank Dwyer led the team with a 19–21 record with a team best 5.07 ERA in 45 games, 39 of them starts. Tom Parrott was 17–19 with a 5.60 ERA in 41 games, while Ice Box Chamberlain was the only Cincinnati pitcher to have a winning record, as he was 10–9 with a 5.77 ERA in 23 games.

=== Season summary ===
After opening the season with three wins, the Reds lost eight of their next ten to fall to a 5–8 record and eighth place. Cincinnati responded with a four-game winning streak to bump themselves over .500, but fell into a slump and won only five of their next twenty-five games.

Pitching was a problem, as during their slump, the team allowed over ten runs a game eight times, and twice allowed over twenty runs a game, which included a 20–11 loss to the Boston Beaneaters, and a 21–8 loss to the Philadelphia Phillies. Cincinnati went on an eleven-game winning streak to close within three games of the .500 level, and broke over the .500 level with a 39–38 record after winning eight in a row later in the season.

From that point on, however, the Reds were never a factor in the pennant race, as they were 16–37 over their last 53 games to finish the year with a dreadful 55–75 record, in tenth place, 35 games behind the Baltimore Orioles.

=== Season standings ===
National League
Team	W	L	Pct.	GB	Home	Road
Baltimore Orioles	89	39	.695	—	52‍–‍15	37‍–‍24
New York Giants	88	44	.667	3	49‍–‍17	39‍–‍27
Boston Beaneaters	83	49	.629	8	44‍–‍19	39‍–‍30
Philadelphia Phillies	71	57	.555	18	48‍–‍20	23‍–‍37
Brooklyn Grooms	70	61	.534	20½	42‍–‍24	28‍–‍37
Cleveland Spiders	68	61	.527	21½	35‍–‍24	33‍–‍37
Pittsburgh Pirates	65	65	.500	25	46‍–‍28	19‍–‍37
Chicago Colts	57	75	.432	34	35‍–‍30	22‍–‍45
St. Louis Browns	56	76	.424	35	34‍–‍32	22‍–‍44
Cincinnati Reds	55	75	.423	35	37‍–‍28	18‍–‍47
Washington Senators	45	87	.341	46	32‍–‍30	13‍–‍57
Louisville Colonels	36	94	.277	54	24‍–‍38	12‍–‍56

=== Record vs. opponents ===
1894 National League record Sources:
Team	BAL	BSN	BRO	CHI	CIN	CLE	LOU	NYG	PHI	PIT	STL	WAS
Baltimore	—	4–8	8–4	9–3	10–2	9–3	10–2	6–6	6–4–1	6–4	10–2	11–1
Boston	8–4	—	6–6	7–5	8–4	9–3	10–2	6–6–1	6–6	8–4	6–6	9–3
Brooklyn	4–8	6–6	—	6–6–1	6–6	6–5	8–4	5–7–1	5–7–1	7–5–1	8–4	9–3
Chicago	3–9	5–7	6–6–1	—	6–6–1	2–10	8–4	1–11–2	7–5	6–6–1	6–6	7–5
Cincinnati	2–10	4–8	6–6	6–6–1	—	3–8–1	7–5	5–7	3–8–2	5–7	7–5	7–5
Cleveland	3–9	3–9	5–6	10–2	8–3–1	—	8–3	3–9	7–5	4–8	9–3	8–4
Louisville	2–10	2–10	4–8	4–8	5–7	3–8	—	0–12–1	3–8	3–9	6–6	4–8
New York	6–6	6–6–1	7–5–1	11–1–2	7–5	9–3	12–0–1	—	5–7	8–4–1	7–5–1	10–2
Philadelphia	4–6–1	6–6	7–5–1	5–7	8–3–2	5–7	8–3	7–5	—	8–4	5–7	8–4
Pittsburgh	4–6	4–8	5–7–1	6–6–1	7–5	8–4	9–3	4–8–1	4–8	—	6–6	8–4
St. Louis	2–10	6–6	4–8	6–6	5–7	3–9	6–6	5–7–1	7–5	6–6	—	6–6
Washington	1–11	3–9	3–9	5–7	5–7	4–8	8–4	2–10	4–8	4–8	6–6	—

=== Game log ===
Legend
Reds Win	Reds Loss	Game Tied/Postponed

1894 Game Log: 55–75 (Home: 37–28; Away: 18–47)
April: 4–4 (Home: 4–4; Away: 0–0)

#	Date	Opponent	Score	Stadium	Attendance	Record	Streak
-	April 19	Colts	Postponed (rain); Makeup: April 20				
1	April 20	Colts	10–6	League Park	7,006	1-0	W1
2	April 21	Colts	8–0	League Park	1,878	2-0	W2
3	April 22	Colts	5–4	League Park	3,162	3-0	W3
4	April 24	Spiders	0–1	League Park	2,000	3-1	L1
5	April 25	Spiders	6–12	League Park	3,000	3-2	L2
6	April 26	Spiders	4–12	League Park	2,800	3-3	L3
7	April 28	Pirates	10–5	League Park	3,100	4-3	W1
8	April 30	Pirates	6–15	League Park	1,900	4-4	L1

May: 7–13 (Home: 4–3; Away: 3–10)

#	Date	Opponent	Score	Stadium	Attendance	Record	Streak
9	May 1	Pirates	6–7	League Park	1,200	4-5	L2
-	May 3	@ Colts	Postponed (rain); Makeup: May 4				
10	May 4	@ Colts	3–6	West Side Park	5,423	4-6	L3
-	May 5	@ Colts	Postponed (rain); Makeup: August 8				
11	May 6	@ Colts	6–6	West Side Park	13,747	4-6	L3
12	May 7	@ Pirates	17–6	Exposition Park	2,500	5-6	W1
13	May 8	@ Pirates	5–6	Exposition Park	2,000	5-7	L1
14	May 9	@ Pirates	3–11	Exposition Park	1,800	5-8	L2
15	May 10	Browns	18–9	League Park	1,800	6-8	W1
16	May 12	Browns	5–0	League Park	3,000	7-8	W2
17	May 13	Browns	7–3	League Park	9,000	8-8	W3
18	May 14	Colonels	12–7	League Park	2,005	9-8	W4
-	May 15	Colonels	Postponed (rain); Makeup: June 23				
19	May 16	Colonels	7–9	League Park	1,818	9-9	L1
-	May 18	@ Browns	Postponed (rain); Makeup: May 20				
20	May 19	@ Browns	2–5	New Sportsman's Park	3,000	9-10	L2
21	May 20 1	@ Browns	3–4	New Sportsman's Park	N/A	9-11	L3
22	May 20 2	@ Browns	7–1	New Sportsman's Park	14,000	10-11	W1
23	May 21	@ Spiders	2–1	League Park	300	11-11	W2
-	May 22	@ Spiders	Postponed (rain, site change); Makeup: July 17				
-	May 23	@ Spiders	Postponed (rain, site change); Makeup: July 18				
24	May 24	@ Colonels	0–6	Eclipse Park	1,409	11-12	L1
25	May 26	@ Colonels	2–5	Eclipse Park	2,500	11-13	L2
-	May 27	@ Colonels	Postponed (site change); Makeup: May 27				
26	May 27	Colonels	5–6	League Park	3,817	11-14	L3
-	May 29	@ Beaneaters	Postponed (wet grounds); Makeup: August 21				
27	May 30 1	@ Beaneaters	10–13	Congress Street Grounds	3,000	11-15	L4
28	May 30 2	@ Beaneaters	11–20	Congress Street Grounds	8,500	11-16	L5
29	May 31	@ Orioles	1–7	Union Park	3,500	11-17	L6

June: 12–13 (Home: 6–2; Away: 6–11)

#	Date	Opponent	Score	Stadium	Attendance	Record	Streak
30	June 1	@ Orioles	8–9	Union Park	3,700	11-18	L7
31	June 2	@ Orioles	6–13	Union Park	7,000	11-19	L8
32	June 4	@ Giants	8–4	Polo Grounds	3,000	12-19	W1
33	June 5	@ Giants	6–10	Polo Grounds	2,500	12-20	L1
-	June 6	@ Giants	Postponed (rain); Makeup: September 1				
34	June 7	@ Senators	3–8	Boundary Field	3,168	12-21	L2
35	June 8	@ Senators	6–9	Boundary Field	3,500	12-22	L3
36	June 9	@ Senators	7–3	Boundary Field	3,600	13-22	W1
37	June 11	@ Grooms	11–12	Eastern Park	3,108	13-23	L1
38	June 12	@ Grooms	5–3	Eastern Park	2,711	14-23	W1
39	June 13	@ Grooms	5–11	Eastern Park	2,880	14-24	L1
40	June 14	@ Phillies	2–5	Philadelphia Baseball Grounds	4,500	14-25	L2
41	June 15	@ Phillies	8–21	Philadelphia Baseball Grounds	4,450	14-26	L3
42	June 16	@ Phillies	9–19	Philadelphia Baseball Grounds	10,500	14-27	L4
43	June 17	Browns	6–9	League Park	2,300	14-28	L5
44	June 18	@ Browns	8–4	New Sportsman's Park	600	15-28	W1
45	June 19	@ Browns	3–2	New Sportsman's Park	1,500	16-28	W2
46	June 20	@ Browns	2–4	New Sportsman's Park	2,000	16-29	L1
47	June 21	Colonels	4–5	League Park	960	16-30	L2
48	June 23 1	Colonels	5–1	League Park	N/A	17-30	W1
49	June 23 2	Colonels	8–3	League Park	2,860	18-30	W2
-	June 24	Colonels	Postponed (site change); Makeup: June 24				
50	June 24	@ Colonels	7–5	Eclipse Park	2,500	19-30	W3
-	June 25	Phillies	Postponed (rain, site change); Makeup: August 27				
-	June 26	Phillies	Postponed (rain, site change); Makeup: August 27				
51	June 27	Phillies	7–3	League Park	1,900	20-30	W4
52	June 28	Senators	5–4	League Park	1,000	21-30	W5
53	June 29	Senators	6–4	League Park	1,100	22-30	W6
54	June 30	Senators	12–0	League Park	2,300	23-30	W7

July: 16–11 (Home: 13–9; Away: 3–2)

#	Date	Opponent	Score	Stadium	Attendance	Record	Streak
55	July 1	Grooms	9–7	League Park	7,000	24-30	W8
56	July 4 1	Grooms	14–7	League Park	7,500	25-30	W9
57	July 4 2	Grooms	13–8	League Park	8,500	26-30	W10
58	July 5	Orioles	20–6	League Park	3,000	27-30	W11
59	July 7	Orioles	2–11	League Park	4,000	27-31	L1
60	July 8	Orioles	4–14	League Park	8,000	27-32	L2
61	July 9	Giants	6–13	League Park	2,000	27-33	L3
62	July 10	Giants	7–3	League Park	1,100	28-33	W1
63	July 11	Giants	6–5	League Park	1,800	29-33	W2
64	July 12	Beaneaters	4–6	League Park	2,500	29-34	L1
65	July 13	Beaneaters	7–22	League Park	2,000	29-35	L2
66	July 14	Beaneaters	14–12	League Park	2,000	30-35	W1
67	July 15	Spiders	17–8	League Park	6,000	31-35	W2
68	July 16	Spiders	1–9	League Park	1,900	31-36	L1
69	July 17	Spiders	7–16	League Park	1,700	31-37	L2
70	July 18	Spiders	4–9	League Park	1,000	31-38	L3
71	July 19	Pirates	8–6	League Park	900	32-38	W1
72	July 20	Pirates	7–6	League Park	1,100	33-38	W2
73	July 21	Pirates	12–4	League Park	2,900	34-38	W3
74	July 22	@ Colonels	4–0	Eclipse Park	4,000	35-38	W4
75	July 23	@ Colonels	9–8	Eclipse Park	625	36-38	W5
76	July 24	@ Colonels	4–3	Eclipse Park	968	37-38	W6
-	July 26	Colts	Postponed (schedule change); Makeup: July 27				
77	July 27	Colts	14–12	League Park	1,927	38-38	W7
78	July 28	Colts	19–13	League Park	2,559	39-38	W8
79	July 29	Colts	9–16	League Park	6,251	39-39	L1
80	July 30	@ Pirates	6–8	Exposition Park	1,500	39-40	L2
81	July 31	@ Pirates	10–11	Exposition Park	1,500	39-41	L3

August: 6–19 (Home: 1–1; Away: 5–17)

#	Date	Opponent	Score	Stadium	Attendance	Record	Streak
82	August 1	@ Pirates	5–15	Exposition Park	2,000	39-42	L4
83	August 2	@ Spiders	4–9	League Park	1,000	39-43	L5
84	August 3	@ Spiders	5–11	League Park	875	39-44	L6
85	August 4	@ Spiders	8–5	League Park	2,100	40-44	W1
86	August 5	@ Colts	1–8	West Side Park	9,446	40-45	L1
87	August 6	@ Colts	9–12	West Side Park	2,062	40-46	L2
88	August 7	@ Colts	11–13	West Side Park	2,100	40-47	L3
89	August 8	@ Colts	14–11	West Side Park	2,203	41-47	W1
-	August 9	Browns	Postponed (schedule change); Makeup: June 17				
90	August 9	@ Colts	6–10	West Side Park	2,556	41-48	L1
91	August 11	Browns	7–6	League Park	2,000	42-48	W1
92	August 12	Browns	5–12	League Park	3,300	42-49	L1
93	August 14	@ Orioles	5–6	Union Park	3,400	42-50	L2
94	August 15	@ Orioles	2–8	Union Park	3,300	42-51	L3
95	August 16	@ Orioles	6–15	Union Park	2,000	42-52	L4
96	August 18	@ Beaneaters	19–6	South End Grounds	4,530	43-52	W1
-	August 20	@ Beaneaters	Postponed (rain); Makeup: August 22				
97	August 21 1	@ Beaneaters	3–18	South End Grounds	N/A	43-53	L1
98	August 21 2	@ Beaneaters	8–25	South End Grounds	4,464	43-54	L2
99	August 22	@ Beaneaters	7–8	South End Grounds	2,510	43-55	L3
100	August 23	@ Grooms	13–2	Eastern Park	2,961	44-55	W1
101	August 24	@ Grooms	9–15	Eastern Park	1,010	44-56	L1
102	August 25	@ Grooms	3–5	Eastern Park	3,612	44-57	L2
103	August 27 1	@ Phillies	19–9	Philadelphia Baseball Grounds	N/A	44-57	L2
104	August 27 2	@ Phillies	9–5	Philadelphia Baseball Grounds	8,200	45-57	W1
105	August 28	@ Senators	7–9	Boundary Field	1,000	45-58	L1
106	August 29	@ Senators	5–9	Boundary Field	2,300	45-59	L2
107	August 30	@ Senators	6–8	Boundary Field	2,500	45-60	L3

September: 10–15 (Home: 9–9; Away: 1–6)

#	Date	Opponent	Score	Stadium	Attendance	Record	Streak
108	September 1 1	@ Giants	8–6	Polo Grounds	N/A	46-60	W1
109	September 1 2	@ Giants	6–8	Polo Grounds	200	46-61	L1
110	September 3 1	@ Giants	2–16	Polo Grounds	3,500	46-62	L2
111	September 3 2	@ Giants	4–6	Polo Grounds	20,000	46-63	L3
112	September 4	@ Phillies	2–6	Philadelphia Baseball Grounds	2,400	46-64	L4
113	September 5	@ Phillies	6–15	Philadelphia Baseball Grounds	2,900	46-65	L5
114	September 6 1	@ Phillies	7–14	Philadelphia Baseball Grounds	N/A	46-65	L5
115	September 6 2	@ Phillies	2–16	Philadelphia Baseball Grounds	5,000	46-66	L6
116	September 8	Senators	14–9	League Park	1,000	47-66	W1
117	September 9 1	Senators	4–1	League Park	N/A	48-66	W2
118	September 9 2	Senators	7–6	League Park	5,800	49-66	W3
-	September 10	Senators	Postponed (schedule change); Makeup: September 9				
119	September 12	Orioles	2–16	League Park	1,500	49-67	L1
-	September 15	Orioles	Postponed (rain); Makeup: September 16				
120	September 16 1	Orioles	2–14	League Park	N/A	49-68	L2
121	September 16 2	Orioles	4–3	League Park	6,800	50-68	W1
-	September 17	Phillies	Postponed (unknown reason); Makeup: September 19				
122	September 18	Phillies	4–10	League Park	1,000	50-69	L1
123	September 19 1	Phillies	11–12	League Park	N/A	50-70	L2
124	September 19 2	Phillies	8–3	League Park	700	51-70	W1
-	September 20	Grooms	Postponed (unknown reason); Makeup: September 23				
125	September 22	Grooms	6–11	League Park	1,100	51-71	L1
126	September 23 1	Grooms	9–10	League Park	N/A	51-72	L2
127	September 23 2	Grooms	3–2	League Park	6,500	52-72	W1
128	September 24	Beaneaters	4–7	League Park	800	52-73	L1
129	September 25 1	Beaneaters	9–7	League Park	N/A	53-73	W1
130	September 25 2	Beaneaters	5–1	League Park	1,000	54-73	W2
-	September 26	Beaneaters	Postponed (schedule change); Makeup: September 25				
131	September 27	Giants	4–11	League Park	1,000	54-74	L1
132	September 28	Giants	8–9	League Park	650	54-75	L2
133	September 29	Giants	7–6	League Park	1,200	55-75	W1
134	September 30	Spiders	16–16	League Park	2,100	55-75	W1

=== Roster ===
1894 Cincinnati Reds
Roster
Pitchers: Fred Blank; Ice Box Chamberlain; Lem Cross; Frank Dwyer; Chauncey Fisher; Carney Flynn; Henry Fournier; Thomas Maguire; Tom Parrott; Bill Pfann; Jesse Tannehill; Bill Whitrock	Catchers: Bill Merritt; Connie Murphy; Morgan Murphy; Farmer Vaughn; Infielders: Charlie Comiskey; Arlie Latham; Bill Massey; Bid McPhee; Frank Motz; Germany Smith	Outfielders: Jim Canavan; Marty Hogan; Bug Holliday; Dummy Hoy; Jack McCarthy	Manager: Charlie Comiskey

== Player stats ==
=== Batting ===
==== Starters by position ====
Note: Pos = Position; G = Games played; AB = At bats; H = Hits; Avg. = Batting average; HR = Home runs; RBI = Runs batted in

Pos	Player	G	AB	H	Avg.	HR	RBI
C	Morgan Murphy	76	261	70	.268	1	37
1B	Charlie Comiskey	61	220	58	.264	0	33
2B	Bid McPhee	128	483	151	.313	5	93
SS	Germany Smith	129	492	130	.264	3	79
3B	Arlie Latham	131	534	167	.313	4	60
OF	Bug Holliday	123	521	196	.376	13	123
OF	Jim Canavan	103	364	100	.275	13	74
OF	Dummy Hoy	128	503	153	.304	5	71

==== Other batters ====
Note: G = Games played; AB = At bats; H = Hits; Avg. = Batting average; HR = Home runs; RBI = Runs batted in

Player	G	AB	H	Avg.	HR	RBI
Farmer Vaughn	72	284	88	.310	8	64
Jack McCarthy	40	167	45	.269	0	21
Bill Merritt	30	117	38	.325	1	22
Frank Motz	18	69	14	.203	0	12
Bill Whitrock	19	65	15	.231	0	8
Bill Massey	13	53	15	.283	0	5
Marty Hogan	6	23	3	.130	0	3
Connie Murphy	1	4	0	.000	0	0

=== Pitching ===
==== Starting pitchers ====
Note: G = Games pitched; IP = Innings pitched; W = Wins; L = Losses; ERA = Earned run average; SO = Strikeouts

Player	G	IP	W	L	ERA	SO
Frank Dwyer	45	348.0	19	21	5.07	49
Tom Parrott	41	308.2	17	19	5.60	61
Ice Box Chamberlain	23	177.2	10	9	5.77	57
Chauncey Fisher	12	100.0	2	8	7.47	17
Bill Whitrock	11	79.1	2	6	6.24	10
Lem Cross	8	53.0	3	4	8.49	11
Fred Blank	1	8.0	0	1	4.50	1
Bill Pfann	1	3.0	0	1	27.00	0

==== Other pitchers ====
Note: G = Games pitched; IP = Innings pitched; W = Wins; L = Losses; ERA = Earned run average; SO = Strikeouts

Player	G	IP	W	L	ERA	SO
Henry Fournier	6	45.0	1	3	5.40	5
Jesse Tannehill	5	29.0	1	1	7.14	7
Carney Flynn	2	7.2	0	2	17.61	4

==== Relief pitchers ====
Note: G = Games pitched; W = Wins; L = Losses; SV = Saves; ERA = Earned run average; SO = Strikeouts

Player	G	W	L	SV	ERA	SO
Thomas Maguire	1	0	0	0	10.50	1
