= 1894 Louisville Colonels season =

1894 Louisville Colonels
- League: National League
- Ballpark: Eclipse Park
- City: Louisville, Kentucky
- Record: 36–94 (.277)
- League place: 12th
- Owners: Barney Dreyfuss
- Managers: Billy Barnie

The 1894 Louisville Colonels season was the third season for the baseball team in the National League. The team finished in last place in the league with a 36–94 record.

== Regular season ==
On August 17, 1894, the Phillies crushed Louisville 29 to 4 at the University Athletic Grounds in Philadelphia after a fire decimated the Philadelphia Ball Park. The Phillies' Sam Thompson went 6 for 7 at bat including a "home run high bounded over the fence from the bicycle track in right center."

=== Season standings ===
National League
Team	W	L	Pct.	GB	Home	Road
Baltimore Orioles	89	39	.695	—	52‍–‍15	37‍–‍24
New York Giants	88	44	.667	3	49‍–‍17	39‍–‍27
Boston Beaneaters	83	49	.629	8	44‍–‍19	39‍–‍30
Philadelphia Phillies	71	57	.555	18	48‍–‍20	23‍–‍37
Brooklyn Grooms	70	61	.534	20½	42‍–‍24	28‍–‍37
Cleveland Spiders	68	61	.527	21½	35‍–‍24	33‍–‍37
Pittsburgh Pirates	65	65	.500	25	46‍–‍28	19‍–‍37
Chicago Colts	57	75	.432	34	35‍–‍30	22‍–‍45
St. Louis Browns	56	76	.424	35	34‍–‍32	22‍–‍44
Cincinnati Reds	55	75	.423	35	37‍–‍28	18‍–‍47
Washington Senators	45	87	.341	46	32‍–‍30	13‍–‍57
Louisville Colonels	36	94	.277	54	24‍–‍38	12‍–‍56

=== Record vs. opponents ===
1894 National League record Sources:
Team	BAL	BSN	BRO	CHI	CIN	CLE	LOU	NYG	PHI	PIT	STL	WAS
Baltimore	—	4–8	8–4	9–3	10–2	9–3	10–2	6–6	6–4–1	6–4	10–2	11–1
Boston	8–4	—	6–6	7–5	8–4	9–3	10–2	6–6–1	6–6	8–4	6–6	9–3
Brooklyn	4–8	6–6	—	6–6–1	6–6	6–5	8–4	5–7–1	5–7–1	7–5–1	8–4	9–3
Chicago	3–9	5–7	6–6–1	—	6–6–1	2–10	8–4	1–11–2	7–5	6–6–1	6–6	7–5
Cincinnati	2–10	4–8	6–6	6–6–1	—	3–8–1	7–5	5–7	3–8–2	5–7	7–5	7–5
Cleveland	3–9	3–9	5–6	10–2	8–3–1	—	8–3	3–9	7–5	4–8	9–3	8–4
Louisville	2–10	2–10	4–8	4–8	5–7	3–8	—	0–12–1	3–8	3–9	6–6	4–8
New York	6–6	6–6–1	7–5–1	11–1–2	7–5	9–3	12–0–1	—	5–7	8–4–1	7–5–1	10–2
Philadelphia	4–6–1	6–6	7–5–1	5–7	8–3–2	5–7	8–3	7–5	—	8–4	5–7	8–4
Pittsburgh	4–6	4–8	5–7–1	6–6–1	7–5	8–4	9–3	4–8–1	4–8	—	6–6	8–4
St. Louis	2–10	6–6	4–8	6–6	5–7	3–9	6–6	5–7–1	7–5	6–6	—	6–6
Washington	1–11	3–9	3–9	5–7	5–7	4–8	8–4	2–10	4–8	4–8	6–6	—

=== Roster ===
1894 Louisville Colonels
Roster
Pitchers: George Hemming; Bert Inks; Matt Kilroy; Phil Knell; Jock Menefee; Harrison Peppers; Scott Stratton; Jack Wadsworth; Bill Whitrock	Catchers: Henry Cote; Billy Earle; John Grim; Fred Zahner; Infielders: William Brown; Jerry Denny; Pat Flaherty; Pete Gilbert; Fred Lake; Luke Lutenberg; Tim O'Rourke; Fred Pfeffer; Danny Richardson	Outfielders: Tom Brown; Fred Clarke; Sam Dungan; George Nicol; Ollie Smith; Larry Twitchell; Farmer Weaver	Manager: Billy Barnie

== Player stats ==
=== Batting ===
==== Starters by position ====
Note: Pos = Position; G = Games played; AB = At bats; H = Hits; Avg. = Batting average; HR = Home runs; RBI = Runs batted in

Pos	Player	G	AB	H	Avg.	HR	RBI
C	John Grim	109	412	123	.299	7	71
1B	Luke Lutenberg	70	255	49	.192	0	23
2B	Fred Pfeffer	105	414	128	.309	5	61
SS	Danny Richardson	116	430	109	.253	1	40
3B	Jerry Denny	60	221	61	.276	0	32
OF	Larry Twitchell	52	210	56	.267	2	32
OF	Fred Clarke	76	314	86	.274	7	48
OF	Tom Brown	130	541	137	.253	9	57

==== Other batters ====
Note: G = Games played; AB = At bats; H = Hits; Avg. = Batting average; HR = Home runs; RBI = Runs batted in

Player	G	AB	H	Avg.	HR	RBI
Farmer Weaver	64	244	54	.221	3	24
Tim O'Rourke	55	220	61	.277	0	27
Pat Flaherty	39	150	43	.287	0	15
Ollie Smith	39	137	41	.299	3	20
George Nicol	28	112	38	.339	0	19
Pete Gilbert	28	108	33	.306	1	14
Billy Earle	21	65	23	.354	0	7
Fred Zahner	14	49	10	.204	0	4
William Brown	13	48	10	.208	0	9
Fred Lake	16	42	12	.286	1	10
Sam Dungan	8	32	11	.344	0	3
Henry Cote	10	31	9	.290	0	3

=== Pitching ===
==== Starting pitchers ====
Note: G = Games pitched; IP = Innings pitched; W = Wins; L = Losses; ERA = Earned run average; SO = Strikeouts

Player	G	IP	W	L	ERA	SO
George Hemming	35	294.1	13	19	4.37	66
Phil Knell	32	247.0	7	21	5.32	67
Jock Menefee	28	211.2	8	17	4.29	43
Jack Wadsworth	22	173.0	4	18	7.60	57
Bert Inks	8	59.2	2	6	6.49	8
Matt Kilroy	8	37.0	0	5	3.89	11
George Nicol	1	9.0	0	1	15.00	3
Bill Whitrock	1	4.0	0	1	9.00	0

==== Other pitchers ====
Note: G = Games pitched; IP = Innings pitched; W = Wins; L = Losses; ERA = Earned run average; SO = Strikeouts

Player	G	IP	W	L	ERA	SO
Scott Stratton	7	43.0	1	5	8.37	3
Harrison Peppers	2	8.0	0	1	6.75	0

==== Relief pitchers ====
Note: G = Games pitched; W = Wins; L = Losses; SV = Saves; ERA = Earned run average; SO = Strikeouts

Player	G	W	L	SV	ERA	SO
Fred Pfeffer	1	0	0	0	2.57	0
Larry Twitchell	1	0	0	0	6.00	0
