= 1894 Boston Beaneaters season =

1894 Boston Beaneaters
- League: National League
- Ballpark: South End Grounds (since 1871); Congress Street Grounds
- City: Boston, Massachusetts
- Record: 83–49–1 (.629)
- League place: 3rd
- Owners: Arthur Soden
- Managers: Frank Selee (5th season)

The 1894 Boston Beaneaters season was the 24th season of the franchise. The team finished in third place in the National League with a record 83–49–1 (.629), 8.0 games behind the Baltimore Orioles and 5.0 games behind the New York Giants. As of 2025, the 1894 Beaneaters hold the MLB record for the most runs scored in a single season by one team with 1,220, a stunning 9.17 runs per contest; however, they also allowed 1,002 runs (7.53 runs allowed per game), the 33rd-most in baseball history.

== Regular season ==
The Beaneaters' home park, the South End Grounds, was destroyed in a fire on May 15. The team played their home games at Congress Street Grounds until the rebuilt park opened on July 20.

=== Season standings ===
National League
Team	W	L	Pct.	GB	Home	Road
Baltimore Orioles	89	39	.695	—	52‍–‍15	37‍–‍24
New York Giants	88	44	.667	3	49‍–‍17	39‍–‍27
Boston Beaneaters	83	49	.629	8	44‍–‍19	39‍–‍30
Philadelphia Phillies	71	57	.555	18	48‍–‍20	23‍–‍37
Brooklyn Grooms	70	61	.534	20½	42‍–‍24	28‍–‍37
Cleveland Spiders	68	61	.527	21½	35‍–‍24	33‍–‍37
Pittsburgh Pirates	65	65	.500	25	46‍–‍28	19‍–‍37
Chicago Colts	57	75	.432	34	35‍–‍30	22‍–‍45
St. Louis Browns	56	76	.424	35	34‍–‍32	22‍–‍44
Cincinnati Reds	55	75	.423	35	37‍–‍28	18‍–‍47
Washington Senators	45	87	.341	46	32‍–‍30	13‍–‍57
Louisville Colonels	36	94	.277	54	24‍–‍38	12‍–‍56

=== Record vs. opponents ===
1894 National League record Sources:
Team	BAL	BSN	BRO	CHI	CIN	CLE	LOU	NYG	PHI	PIT	STL	WAS
Baltimore	—	4–8	8–4	9–3	10–2	9–3	10–2	6–6	6–4–1	6–4	10–2	11–1
Boston	8–4	—	6–6	7–5	8–4	9–3	10–2	6–6–1	6–6	8–4	6–6	9–3
Brooklyn	4–8	6–6	—	6–6–1	6–6	6–5	8–4	5–7–1	5–7–1	7–5–1	8–4	9–3
Chicago	3–9	5–7	6–6–1	—	6–6–1	2–10	8–4	1–11–2	7–5	6–6–1	6–6	7–5
Cincinnati	2–10	4–8	6–6	6–6–1	—	3–8–1	7–5	5–7	3–8–2	5–7	7–5	7–5
Cleveland	3–9	3–9	5–6	10–2	8–3–1	—	8–3	3–9	7–5	4–8	9–3	8–4
Louisville	2–10	2–10	4–8	4–8	5–7	3–8	—	0–12–1	3–8	3–9	6–6	4–8
New York	6–6	6–6–1	7–5–1	11–1–2	7–5	9–3	12–0–1	—	5–7	8–4–1	7–5–1	10–2
Philadelphia	4–6–1	6–6	7–5–1	5–7	8–3–2	5–7	8–3	7–5	—	8–4	5–7	8–4
Pittsburgh	4–6	4–8	5–7–1	6–6–1	7–5	8–4	9–3	4–8–1	4–8	—	6–6	8–4
St. Louis	2–10	6–6	4–8	6–6	5–7	3–9	6–6	5–7–1	7–5	6–6	—	6–6
Washington	1–11	3–9	3–9	5–7	5–7	4–8	8–4	2–10	4–8	4–8	6–6	—

=== Roster ===
1894 Boston Beaneaters
Roster
Pitchers: Marvin Hawley; George Hodson; Henry Lampe; Tom Lovett; Kid Nichols; Tom Smith; Harry Staley; Jack Stivetts; George Stultz; Frank West	Catchers: Charlie Ganzel; Bill Merritt; Jack Ryan; Fred Tenney; Infielders: Frank Connaughton; Herman Long; Bobby Lowe; Billy Nash; Tommy Tucker	Outfielders: Jimmy Bannon; Hugh Duffy; Tommy McCarthy	Manager: Frank Selee

== Player stats ==
=== Batting ===
==== Starters by position ====
Note: Pos = Position; G = Games played; AB = At bats; H = Hits; Avg. = Batting average; HR = Home runs; RBI = Runs batted in

Pos	Player	G	AB	H	Avg.	HR	RBI
C	Charlie Ganzel	70	266	74	.278	3	56
1B	Tommy Tucker	123	500	165	.330	3	100
2B	Bobby Lowe	133	613	212	.346	17	115
SS	Herman Long	104	475	154	.324	12	79
3B	Billy Nash	132	512	148	.289	8	87
OF	Hugh Duffy	125	539	237	.440	18	145
OF	Jimmy Bannon	128	494	166	.336	13	114
OF	Tommy McCarthy	127	539	188	.349	13	126

==== Other batters ====
Note: G = Games played; AB = At bats; H = Hits; Avg. = Batting average; HR = Home runs; RBI = Runs batted in

Player	G	AB	H	Avg.	HR	RBI
Jack Ryan	53	201	54	.269	1	29
Frank Connaughton	46	171	59	.345	2	33
Fred Tenney	27	86	34	.395	2	21
Bill Merritt	10	26	6	.231	0	6

=== Pitching ===
==== Starting pitchers ====
Note: G = Games pitched; IP = Innings pitched; W = Wins; L = Losses; ERA = Earned run average; SO = Strikeouts

Player	G	IP	W	L	ERA	SO
Kid Nichols	50	407.0	32	13	4.75	113
Jack Stivetts	45	338.0	26	14	4.90	76
Harry Staley	27	208.2	12	10	6.81	32
Tom Lovett	15	104.0	6	8	5.97	23
George Hodson	12	74.0	4	4	5.84	12
George Stultz	1	9.0	1	0	0.00	1
Marvin Hawley	1	7.0	0	1	7.71	1

==== Other pitchers ====
Note: G = Games pitched; IP = Innings pitched; W = Wins; L = Losses; ERA = Earned run average; SO = Strikeouts

Player	G	IP	W	L	ERA	SO
Henry Lampe	2	5.1	0	1	11.81	1

==== Relief pitchers ====
Note: G = Games pitched; W = Wins; L = Losses; SV = Saves; ERA = Earned run average; SO = Strikeouts

Player	G	W	L	SV	ERA	SO
Tom Smith	2	0	0	1	15.00	2
Frank West	1	0	0	0	9.00	1
Jimmy Bannon	1	0	0	0	0.00	0
Tommy McCarthy	1	0	0	0	4.50	0

== Awards and honors ==
- Hugh Duffy, Major League Baseball record, highest single-season batting average (.440)
