= 1894 St. Louis Browns season =

Major League Baseball season

1894 St. Louis Browns
- League: National League
- Ballpark: New Sportsman's Park
- City: St. Louis, Missouri
- Record: 56–76 (.424)
- League place: 9th
- Owners: Chris von der Ahe
- Managers: Doggie Miller
- Stats: ESPN.com; Baseball Reference

The 1894 St. Louis Browns season was the team's 13th season in St. Louis, Missouri and the third season in the National League. The Browns went 56–76 during the season and finished ninth in the National League.

== Regular season ==
=== Season standings ===
National League
Team	W	L	Pct.	GB	Home	Road
Baltimore Orioles	89	39	.695	—	52‍–‍15	37‍–‍24
New York Giants	88	44	.667	3	49‍–‍17	39‍–‍27
Boston Beaneaters	83	49	.629	8	44‍–‍19	39‍–‍30
Philadelphia Phillies	71	57	.555	18	48‍–‍20	23‍–‍37
Brooklyn Grooms	70	61	.534	20½	42‍–‍24	28‍–‍37
Cleveland Spiders	68	61	.527	21½	35‍–‍24	33‍–‍37
Pittsburgh Pirates	65	65	.500	25	46‍–‍28	19‍–‍37
Chicago Colts	57	75	.432	34	35‍–‍30	22‍–‍45
St. Louis Browns	56	76	.424	35	34‍–‍32	22‍–‍44
Cincinnati Reds	55	75	.423	35	37‍–‍28	18‍–‍47
Washington Senators	45	87	.341	46	32‍–‍30	13‍–‍57
Louisville Colonels	36	94	.277	54	24‍–‍38	12‍–‍56

=== Record vs. opponents ===
1894 National League record Sources:
Team	BAL	BSN	BRO	CHI	CIN	CLE	LOU	NYG	PHI	PIT	STL	WAS
Baltimore	—	4–8	8–4	9–3	10–2	9–3	10–2	6–6	6–4–1	6–4	10–2	11–1
Boston	8–4	—	6–6	7–5	8–4	9–3	10–2	6–6–1	6–6	8–4	6–6	9–3
Brooklyn	4–8	6–6	—	6–6–1	6–6	6–5	8–4	5–7–1	5–7–1	7–5–1	8–4	9–3
Chicago	3–9	5–7	6–6–1	—	6–6–1	2–10	8–4	1–11–2	7–5	6–6–1	6–6	7–5
Cincinnati	2–10	4–8	6–6	6–6–1	—	3–8–1	7–5	5–7	3–8–2	5–7	7–5	7–5
Cleveland	3–9	3–9	5–6	10–2	8–3–1	—	8–3	3–9	7–5	4–8	9–3	8–4
Louisville	2–10	2–10	4–8	4–8	5–7	3–8	—	0–12–1	3–8	3–9	6–6	4–8
New York	6–6	6–6–1	7–5–1	11–1–2	7–5	9–3	12–0–1	—	5–7	8–4–1	7–5–1	10–2
Philadelphia	4–6–1	6–6	7–5–1	5–7	8–3–2	5–7	8–3	7–5	—	8–4	5–7	8–4
Pittsburgh	4–6	4–8	5–7–1	6–6–1	7–5	8–4	9–3	4–8–1	4–8	—	6–6	8–4
St. Louis	2–10	6–6	4–8	6–6	5–7	3–9	6–6	5–7–1	7–5	6–6	—	6–6
Washington	1–11	3–9	3–9	5–7	5–7	4–8	8–4	2–10	4–8	4–8	6–6	—

=== Roster ===
1894 St. Louis Browns
Roster
Pitchers: Ted Breitenstein; Dad Clarkson; Kid Gleason; Pink Hawley; Ernie Mason; Catchers: Dick Buckley; Art Twineham	Infielders: Art Ball; William Brown; Roger Connor; Bones Ely; Doggie Miller; Tim O'Rourke; Heinie Peitz; Joe Quinn; John Ricks	Outfielders: Pete Browning; Duff Cooley; Tommy Dowd; Charlie Frank; Marty Hogan; George Paynter; Joe Peitz; Paul Russell; Frank Shugart	Manager: Doggie Miller

== Player stats ==
=== Batting ===
==== Starters by position ====
Note: Pos = Position; G = Games played; AB = At bats; H = Hits; Avg. = Batting average; HR = Home runs; RBI = Runs batted in

Pos	Player	G	AB	H	Avg.	HR	RBI
C	Heinie Peitz	99	338	89	.263	3	49
1B	Roger Connor	99	380	122	.321	7	79
2B	Joe Quinn	106	405	116	.286	4	61
3B	Doggie Miller	127	481	153	.339	8	86
SS	Bones Ely	127	510	156	.306	12	89
OF	Charlie Frank	80	319	89	.279	4	42
OF	Frank Shugart	133	527	154	.292	7	72
OF	Tommy Dowd	123	524	142	.271	4	62

==== Other batters ====
Note: G = Games played; AB = At bats; H = Hits; Avg. = Batting average; HR = Home runs; RBI = Runs batted in

Player	G	AB	H	Avg.	HR	RBI
Duff Cooley	54	206	61	.296	1	21
Art Twineham	38	127	40	.315	1	16
Marty Hogan	29	100	28	.280	0	13
Dick Buckley	29	89	16	.180	1	3
Tim O'Rourke	18	71	20	.282	0	10
Joe Peitz	7	26	11	.423	0	3
Paul Russell	3	10	1	.100	0	0
William Brown	3	9	1	.111	0	0
Pete Browning	2	7	1	.143	0	0
George Paynter	1	4	0	.000	0	0
Art Ball	1	3	1	.333	0	0
John Ricks	1	1	0	.000	0	0

=== Pitching ===
==== Starting pitchers ====
Note: G = Games pitched; IP = Innings pitched; W = Wins; L = Losses; ERA = Earned run average; SO = Strikeouts

Player	G	IP	W	L	ERA	SO
Ted Breitenstein	56	447.1	27	23	4.79	140
Pink Hawley	53	392.2	19	27	4.90	120
Dad Clarkson	32	233.1	8	17	6.36	46
Kid Gleason	8	58.0	2	6	6.05	9

==== Other pitchers ====
Note: G = Games pitched; IP = Innings pitched; W = Wins; L = Losses; ERA = Earned run average; SO = Strikeouts

Player	G	IP	W	L	ERA	SO
Ernie Mason	4	22.2	0	3	7.15	3

==== Relief pitchers ====
Note: G = Games pitched; W = Wins; L = Losses; SV = Saves; ERA = Earned run average; SO = Strikeouts

Player	G	W	L	SV	ERA	SO
Charlie Frank	2	0	0	0	15.00	1
Heinie Peitz	1	0	0	0	9.00	0
Bones Ely	1	0	0	0	0.00	0
