= 1894 Pittsburgh Pirates season =

1894 Pittsburgh Pirates
- League: National League
- Ballpark: Exposition Park
- City: Allegheny, Pennsylvania
- Record: 65–65 (.500)
- League place: 7th
- Owners: William Kerr and Phil Auten
- Managers: Al Buckenberger, Connie Mack

The 1894 Pittsburgh (Note: Until early in the 20th century, the name of Pittsburgh was spelled both with and without the final 'h'.) Pirates season was the 13th season of the Pittsburgh Pirates franchise; their eighth in the National League. The Pirates finished seventh in the National League with a record of 65–65.

== Regular season ==
=== Season standings ===
National League
Team	W	L	Pct.	GB	Home	Road
Baltimore Orioles	89	39	.695	—	52‍–‍15	37‍–‍24
New York Giants	88	44	.667	3	49‍–‍17	39‍–‍27
Boston Beaneaters	83	49	.629	8	44‍–‍19	39‍–‍30
Philadelphia Phillies	71	57	.555	18	48‍–‍20	23‍–‍37
Brooklyn Grooms	70	61	.534	20½	42‍–‍24	28‍–‍37
Cleveland Spiders	68	61	.527	21½	35‍–‍24	33‍–‍37
Pittsburgh Pirates	65	65	.500	25	46‍–‍28	19‍–‍37
Chicago Colts	57	75	.432	34	35‍–‍30	22‍–‍45
St. Louis Browns	56	76	.424	35	34‍–‍32	22‍–‍44
Cincinnati Reds	55	75	.423	35	37‍–‍28	18‍–‍47
Washington Senators	45	87	.341	46	32‍–‍30	13‍–‍57
Louisville Colonels	36	94	.277	54	24‍–‍38	12‍–‍56

=== Record vs. opponents ===
1894 National League record Sources:
Team	BAL	BSN	BRO	CHI	CIN	CLE	LOU	NYG	PHI	PIT	STL	WAS
Baltimore	—	4–8	8–4	9–3	10–2	9–3	10–2	6–6	6–4–1	6–4	10–2	11–1
Boston	8–4	—	6–6	7–5	8–4	9–3	10–2	6–6–1	6–6	8–4	6–6	9–3
Brooklyn	4–8	6–6	—	6–6–1	6–6	6–5	8–4	5–7–1	5–7–1	7–5–1	8–4	9–3
Chicago	3–9	5–7	6–6–1	—	6–6–1	2–10	8–4	1–11–2	7–5	6–6–1	6–6	7–5
Cincinnati	2–10	4–8	6–6	6–6–1	—	3–8–1	7–5	5–7	3–8–2	5–7	7–5	7–5
Cleveland	3–9	3–9	5–6	10–2	8–3–1	—	8–3	3–9	7–5	4–8	9–3	8–4
Louisville	2–10	2–10	4–8	4–8	5–7	3–8	—	0–12–1	3–8	3–9	6–6	4–8
New York	6–6	6–6–1	7–5–1	11–1–2	7–5	9–3	12–0–1	—	5–7	8–4–1	7–5–1	10–2
Philadelphia	4–6–1	6–6	7–5–1	5–7	8–3–2	5–7	8–3	7–5	—	8–4	5–7	8–4
Pittsburgh	4–6	4–8	5–7–1	6–6–1	7–5	8–4	9–3	4–8–1	4–8	—	6–6	8–4
St. Louis	2–10	6–6	4–8	6–6	5–7	3–9	6–6	5–7–1	7–5	6–6	—	6–6
Washington	1–11	3–9	3–9	5–7	5–7	4–8	8–4	2–10	4–8	4–8	6–6	—

=== Roster ===
1894 Pittsburgh Pirates
Roster
Pitchers: Tom Colcolough; Jack Easton; Red Ehret; Ad Gumbert; Harry Jordan; Frank Killen; Phil Knell; Jock Menefee; George Nicol; Adonis Terry	Catchers: Connie Mack; Bill Merritt; Joe Sugden; Farmer Weaver; Infielders: Jake Beckley; Lou Bierbauer; Monte Cross; Gene DeMontreville; Jack Glasscock; Fred Hartman; Denny Lyons; Jim Ritz; Frank Scheibeck; Gene Steere	Outfielders: Patsy Donovan; Mike Smith; Jake Stenzel	Manager: Al Buckenberger; Connie Mack

== Player stats ==
=== Batting ===
==== Starters by position ====
Note: Pos = Position; G = Games played; AB = At bats; H = Hits; Avg. = Batting average; HR = Home runs; RBI = Runs batted in

Pos	Player	G	AB	H	Avg.	HR	RBI
C	Connie Mack	70	231	57	.247	1	21
1B	Jake Beckley	132	537	185	.345	7	122
2B	Lou Bierbauer	131	528	160	.303	3	109
SS	Jack Glasscock	87	335	94	.281	1	65
3B	Denny Lyons	72	257	82	.319	4	51
OF	Mike Smith	126	490	175	.357	6	74
OF	Jake Stenzel	132	525	185	.352	13	121
OF	Patsy Donovan	133	577	175	.303	4	76

==== Other batters ====
Note: G = Games played; AB = At bats; H = Hits; Avg. = Batting average; HR = Home runs; RBI = Runs batted in

Player	G	AB	H	Avg.	HR	RBI
Fred Hartman	49	182	58	.319	2	20
Joe Sugden	39	139	46	.331	2	23
Farmer Weaver	30	115	40	.348	0	24
Bill Merritt	36	109	30	.275	1	18
Frank Scheibeck	28	102	36	.353	1	10
Monte Cross	13	43	19	.442	2	13
Gene Steere	10	39	8	.205	0	4
Gene DeMontreville	2	8	2	.250	0	0
Jim Ritz	1	4	0	.000	0	0

=== Pitching ===
==== Starting pitchers ====
Note: G = Games pitched; IP = Innings pitched; W = Wins; L = Losses; ERA = Earned run average; SO = Strikeouts

Player	G	IP	W	L	ERA	SO
Red Ehret	46	346.2	19	21	5.14	102
Ad Gumbert	38	271.0	15	14	6.04	67
Frank Killen	28	204.0	14	11	4.50	62
Jock Menefee	13	111.2	5	8	5.40	33
Harry Jordan	1	9.0	1	0	4.00	1
Adonis Terry	1	0.2	0	1	67.50	0

==== Other pitchers ====
Note: G = Games pitched; IP = Innings pitched; W = Wins; L = Losses; ERA = Earned run average; SO = Strikeouts

Player	G	IP	W	L	ERA	SO
Tom Colcolough	22	148.2	8	5	7.08	29
George Nicol	9	46.1	3	4	6.22	13
Jack Easton	3	19.2	0	1	4.12	1

==== Relief pitchers ====
Note: G = Games pitched; W = Wins; L = Losses; SV = Saves; ERA = Earned run average; SO = Strikeouts

Player	G	IP	W	L	ERA	SO
Phil Knell	1	0	0	0	11.57	0
Mike Smith	1	0	0	0	4.50	0
