= 1894 Philadelphia Phillies season =

National League season

1894 Philadelphia Phillies
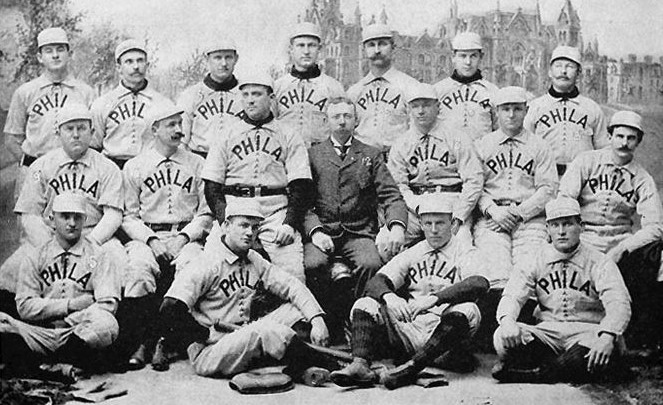
- 1894 Philadelphia Phillies
- League: National League
- Ballpark: Philadelphia Base Ball Grounds
- City: Philadelphia, Pennsylvania
- Record: 71–54 (.568)
- League place: 4th
- Owners: Al Reach, John Rogers
- Managers: Arthur Irwin

The 1894 baseball season was the Philadelphia Phillies' 12th season in the National League. The team finished in fourth place with a record of 71–57, 18 games behind the Baltimore Orioles.

== Background ==
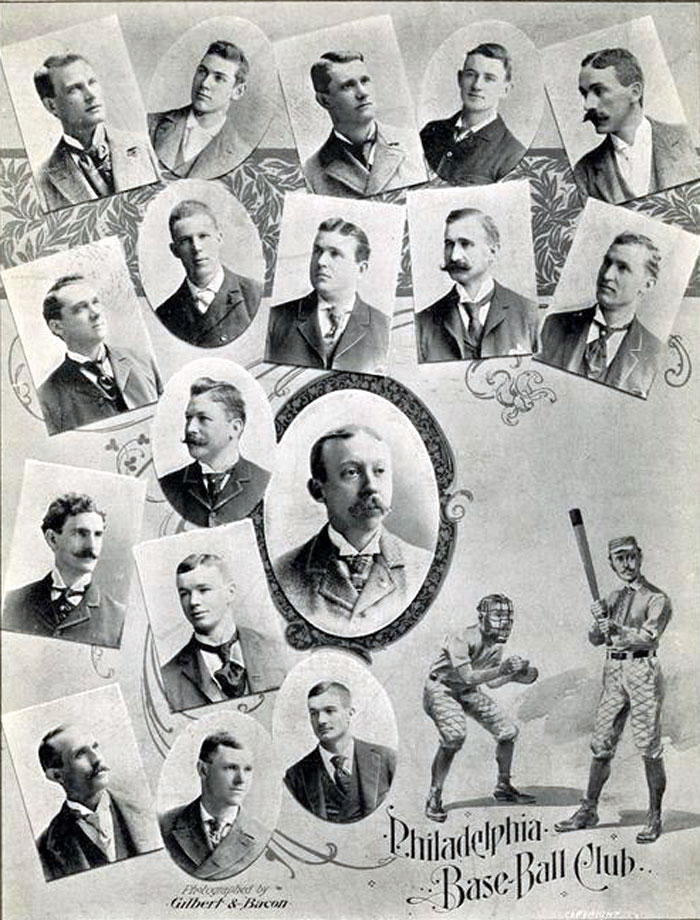
The 1894 Philadelphia Phillies

In August 1894, the Phillies scored 312 runs, which still stands as the record in Major League Baseball for runs scored in a single month. Four of the team's outfielders hit over .400: Hall of Famers Sam Thompson, Ed Delehanty, and Billy Hamilton, plus reserve Tuck Turner.

The Phillies set the record for the highest team batting average for a single season, .349 according to Baseball Almanac or .350 according to Stathead.

On August 6, 1894, at 11:00 AM, while the players were practicing at the ballpark, a fire broke out in the pavilion. The players rushed to contain it but were quickly overwhelmed by the smoke. Within two hours, the fire had reduced the ballpark to charred wood and ashes. The grandstand and bleachers of the original stadium were destroyed inflicting $80,000 in damages, equivalent to $2.98 million in 2025, which was covered fully by insurance. The fire also spread to the adjoining properties, causing an additional $20,000 in damage, equivalent to $744,231 in 2025.

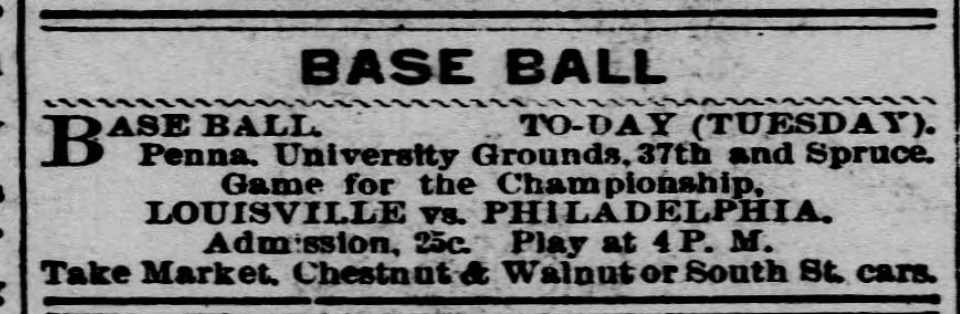
Advertisement Louisville Colonels at Philadelphia Phillies at University of Pennsylvania Athletic Grounds, 37th/Spruce Streets, August 14, 1894

While the Phillies were playing a short road trip and staging six home games at the University of Pennsylvania Grounds at 37th and Spruce, a building crew worked around the clock erecting temporary bleachers. The makeshift stands were finished in time for the game on August 18. Following a fire which destroyed its ballpark on August 6, the Phillies played half a dozen home games at the University of Pennsylvania athletic field. The team was especially productive there, winning five of its six games, and outscoring its opponents 93 to 35, including one game it won 29 to 4.

The Phillies returned to Broad and Huntington for the August 18, 1894 game against Cleveland rebuilt with new bleachers. 5,500 fans paid admission of which 4,000 were seated in left field. The weather threatened rain otherwise a larger crowd would have been expected to see the Phillies win 11 to 6.

== Regular season ==
=== Season standings ===
National League
Team	W	L	Pct.	GB	Home	Road
Baltimore Orioles	89	39	.695	—	52‍–‍15	37‍–‍24
New York Giants	88	44	.667	3	49‍–‍17	39‍–‍27
Boston Beaneaters	83	49	.629	8	44‍–‍19	39‍–‍30
Philadelphia Phillies	71	57	.555	18	48‍–‍20	23‍–‍37
Brooklyn Grooms	70	61	.534	20½	42‍–‍24	28‍–‍37
Cleveland Spiders	68	61	.527	21½	35‍–‍24	33‍–‍37
Pittsburgh Pirates	65	65	.500	25	46‍–‍28	19‍–‍37
Chicago Colts	57	75	.432	34	35‍–‍30	22‍–‍45
St. Louis Browns	56	76	.424	35	34‍–‍32	22‍–‍44
Cincinnati Reds	55	75	.423	35	37‍–‍28	18‍–‍47
Washington Senators	45	87	.341	46	32‍–‍30	13‍–‍57
Louisville Colonels	36	94	.277	54	24‍–‍38	12‍–‍56

=== Record vs. opponents ===
1894 National League record Sources:
Team	BAL	BSN	BRO	CHI	CIN	CLE	LOU	NYG	PHI	PIT	STL	WAS
Baltimore	—	4–8	8–4	9–3	10–2	9–3	10–2	6–6	6–4–1	6–4	10–2	11–1
Boston	8–4	—	6–6	7–5	8–4	9–3	10–2	6–6–1	6–6	8–4	6–6	9–3
Brooklyn	4–8	6–6	—	6–6–1	6–6	6–5	8–4	5–7–1	5–7–1	7–5–1	8–4	9–3
Chicago	3–9	5–7	6–6–1	—	6–6–1	2–10	8–4	1–11–2	7–5	6–6–1	6–6	7–5
Cincinnati	2–10	4–8	6–6	6–6–1	—	3–8–1	7–5	5–7	3–8–2	5–7	7–5	7–5
Cleveland	3–9	3–9	5–6	10–2	8–3–1	—	8–3	3–9	7–5	4–8	9–3	8–4
Louisville	2–10	2–10	4–8	4–8	5–7	3–8	—	0–12–1	3–8	3–9	6–6	4–8
New York	6–6	6–6–1	7–5–1	11–1–2	7–5	9–3	12–0–1	—	5–7	8–4–1	7–5–1	10–2
Philadelphia	4–6–1	6–6	7–5–1	5–7	8–3–2	5–7	8–3	7–5	—	8–4	5–7	8–4
Pittsburgh	4–6	4–8	5–7–1	6–6–1	7–5	8–4	9–3	4–8–1	4–8	—	6–6	8–4
St. Louis	2–10	6–6	4–8	6–6	5–7	3–9	6–6	5–7–1	7–5	6–6	—	6–6
Washington	1–11	3–9	3–9	5–7	5–7	4–8	8–4	2–10	4–8	4–8	6–6	—

=== Roster ===
1894 Philadelphia Phillies
Roster
Pitchers: Al Burris; Nixey Callahan; Kid Carsey; Jack Fanning; Frank Figgemeier; George Haddock; George Harper; Lou Johnson; Alex Jones; Al Lukens; Jack Scheible; Jack Taylor; Gus Weyhing	Catchers: Dick Buckley; Jack Clements; Mike Grady; Infielders: Bob Allen; Jack Boyle; Lave Cross; Tom Delahanty; Bill Hallman; Arthur Irwin; Tom Murray; Charlie Reilly; Joe Sullivan; Charlie Yingling	Outfielders: Ed Delahanty; Billy Hamilton; Sam Thompson; Tuck Turner	Manager: Arthur Irwin

== Player stats ==
=== Batting ===
==== Starters by position ====
Note: Pos = Position; G = Games played; AB = At bats; H = Hits; Avg. = Batting average; HR = Home runs; RBI = Runs batted in

Pos	Player	G	AB	H	Avg.	HR	RBI
C	Jack Clements	48	171	60	.351	3	36
1B	Jack Boyle	117	510	153	.300	4	89
2B	Bill Hallman	122	519	162	.312	0	69
3B	Lave Cross	122	542	210	.387	7	132
SS	Joe Sullivan	77	312	110	.353	3	63
OF	Billy Hamilton	132	558	225	.403	4	90
OF	Ed Delahanty	116	494	200	.405	4	133
OF	Sam Thompson	102	451	187	.415	13	147

==== Other batters ====
Note: G = Games played; AB = At bats; H = Hits; Avg. = Batting average; HR = Home runs; RBI = Runs batted in

Player	G	AB	H	Avg.	HR	RBI
Tuck Turner	82	347	145	.418	1	84
Bob Allen	41	154	40	.260	0	19
Arthur Irwin	1	0	0	----	0	0

=== Pitching ===
==== Starting pitchers ====
Note: G = Games pitched; IP = Innings pitched; W = Wins; L = Losses; ERA = Earned run average; SO = Strikeouts

Player	G	IP	W	L	ERA	SO
Jack Taylor	41	298.0	23	13	4.08	76
Kid Carsey	37	288.1	18	12	5.52	43
Lou Johnson	4	32.2	1	1	6.06	10

==== Other pitchers ====
Note: G = Games pitched; IP = Innings pitched; W = Wins; L = Losses; ERA = Earned run average; SO = Strikeouts

Player	G	IP	W	L	ERA	SO
Nixey Callahan	9	33.2	1	2	9.89	9

==== Relief pitchers ====
Note: G = Games pitched; W = Wins; L = Losses; SV = Saves; ERA = Earned run average; SO = Strikeouts

Player	G	W	L	SV	ERA	SO
Tuck Turner	1	0	0	0	7.50	3
Al Burris	1	0	0	0	18.00	0
