= 1894 Baltimore Orioles season =

1894 Baltimore Orioles
- 1894 National League champions
- League: National League
- Ballpark: Union Park
- City: Baltimore, Maryland
- Record: 89–39 (.695)
- League place: 1st
- Owners: Harry Von der Horst
- Managers: Ned Hanlon

The Baltimore Orioles won their first National League pennant in 1894. They won 24 of their last 25 games. After the regular season's conclusion, the Orioles participated in the first Temple Cup competition against the second-place New York Giants. The Orioles lost to the Giants in a sweep, four games to none.

The Orioles roster contained six future Hall of Famers: Wilbert Robinson, John McGraw, Dan Brouthers, Hughie Jennings, Wee Willie Keeler and Joe Kelley. Every man in their starting line-up hit .300 for the season. They bunted, hit-and-ran, Baltimore chopped, backed up throws, cut off throws, and had pitchers cover first. They also deadened balls by icing them, tilted baselines so bunts would roll fair, and put soap around the mound so an opposing pitcher would get slippery fingers if he tried to dry his hands in the dirt.

== Regular season ==
=== Season standings ===
National League
Team	W	L	Pct.	GB	Home	Road
Baltimore Orioles	89	39	.695	—	52‍–‍15	37‍–‍24
New York Giants	88	44	.667	3	49‍–‍17	39‍–‍27
Boston Beaneaters	83	49	.629	8	44‍–‍19	39‍–‍30
Philadelphia Phillies	71	57	.555	18	48‍–‍20	23‍–‍37
Brooklyn Grooms	70	61	.534	20½	42‍–‍24	28‍–‍37
Cleveland Spiders	68	61	.527	21½	35‍–‍24	33‍–‍37
Pittsburgh Pirates	65	65	.500	25	46‍–‍28	19‍–‍37
Chicago Colts	57	75	.432	34	35‍–‍30	22‍–‍45
St. Louis Browns	56	76	.424	35	34‍–‍32	22‍–‍44
Cincinnati Reds	55	75	.423	35	37‍–‍28	18‍–‍47
Washington Senators	45	87	.341	46	32‍–‍30	13‍–‍57
Louisville Colonels	36	94	.277	54	24‍–‍38	12‍–‍56

=== Record vs. opponents ===
1894 National League record Sources:
Team	BAL	BSN	BRO	CHI	CIN	CLE	LOU	NYG	PHI	PIT	STL	WAS
Baltimore	—	4–8	8–4	9–3	10–2	9–3	10–2	6–6	6–4–1	6–4	10–2	11–1
Boston	8–4	—	6–6	7–5	8–4	9–3	10–2	6–6–1	6–6	8–4	6–6	9–3
Brooklyn	4–8	6–6	—	6–6–1	6–6	6–5	8–4	5–7–1	5–7–1	7–5–1	8–4	9–3
Chicago	3–9	5–7	6–6–1	—	6–6–1	2–10	8–4	1–11–2	7–5	6–6–1	6–6	7–5
Cincinnati	2–10	4–8	6–6	6–6–1	—	3–8–1	7–5	5–7	3–8–2	5–7	7–5	7–5
Cleveland	3–9	3–9	5–6	10–2	8–3–1	—	8–3	3–9	7–5	4–8	9–3	8–4
Louisville	2–10	2–10	4–8	4–8	5–7	3–8	—	0–12–1	3–8	3–9	6–6	4–8
New York	6–6	6–6–1	7–5–1	11–1–2	7–5	9–3	12–0–1	—	5–7	8–4–1	7–5–1	10–2
Philadelphia	4–6–1	6–6	7–5–1	5–7	8–3–2	5–7	8–3	7–5	—	8–4	5–7	8–4
Pittsburgh	4–6	4–8	5–7–1	6–6–1	7–5	8–4	9–3	4–8–1	4–8	—	6–6	8–4
St. Louis	2–10	6–6	4–8	6–6	5–7	3–9	6–6	5–7–1	7–5	6–6	—	6–6
Washington	1–11	3–9	3–9	5–7	5–7	4–8	8–4	2–10	4–8	4–8	6–6	—

=== Roster ===
1894 Baltimore Orioles
Roster
Pitchers: Stub Brown; Duke Esper; Kid Gleason; Bill Hawke; George Hemming; Jack Horner; Bert Inks; Sadie McMahon; Tony Mullane	Catchers: Boileryard Clarke; Wilbert Robinson; Infielders: Frank Bonner; Dan Brouthers; Hughie Jennings; John McGraw; Heinie Reitz	Outfielders: Kirtley Baker; Steve Brodie; Willie Keeler; Joe Kelley	Manager: Ned Hanlon

== Player stats ==
=== Batting ===
==== Starters by position ====
Note: Pos = Position; G = Games played; AB = At bats; H = Hits; Avg. = Batting average; HR = Home runs; RBI = Runs batted in

Pos	Player	G	AB	H	Avg.	HR	RBI
C	Wilbert Robinson	109	414	146	.353	1	98
1B	Dan Brouthers	123	525	182	.347	9	128
2B	Heinie Reitz	108	446	135	.303	2	105
SS	Hughie Jennings	128	501	168	.335	4	109
3B	John McGraw	124	512	174	.340	1	92
OF	Willie Keeler	129	590	219	.371	5	94
OF	Steve Brodie	129	573	210	.366	3	113
OF	Joe Kelley	129	507	199	.393	6	111

==== Other batters ====
Note: G = Games played; AB = At bats; H = Hits; Avg. = Batting average; HR = Home runs; RBI = Runs batted in

Player	G	AB	H	Avg.	HR	RBI
Frank Bonner	33	118	38	.322	0	24
Boileryard Clarke	28	100	24	.240	1	19
Kirtley Baker	2	4	0	.000	0	0

=== Pitching ===
==== Starting pitchers ====
Note: G = Games pitched; IP = Innings pitched; W = Wins; L = Losses; ERA = Earned run average; SO = Strikeouts

Player	G	IP	W	L	ERA	SO
Sadie McMahon	35	275.2	25	8	4.21	60
Bill Hawke	32	206.0	16	9	5.81	68
Kid Gleason	21	172.0	15	5	4.45	35
George Hemming	6	45.1	4	0	3.57	4

==== Other pitchers ====
Note: G = Games pitched; IP = Innings pitched; W = Wins; L = Losses; ERA = Earned run average; SO = Strikeouts

Player	G	IP	W	L	ERA	SO
Bert Inks	22	133.0	9	4	5.55	30
Tony Mullane	21	122.2	6	9	6.31	43
Duke Esper	16	101.0	10	2	3.92	25
Stub Brown	9	49.2	4	0	4.89	8
Jack Horner	2	11.0	0	1	9.00	2

==== Relief pitchers ====
Note: G = Games pitched; W = Wins; L = Losses; SV = Saves; ERA = Earned run average; SO = Strikeouts

Player	G	W	L	SV	ERA	SO
Kirtley Baker	1	0	1	0	∞	0
