= 1894 New York Giants season =

1894 New York Giants
- Temple Cup Champions
- League: National League
- Ballpark: Polo Grounds
- City: New York City
- Record: 88–44 (.667)
- League place: 2nd
- Owners: Cornelius Van Cott
- Managers: John Montgomery Ward

The 1894 New York Giants season was the franchise's 12th season. The team finished second in the National League pennant race with an 88–44 record, three games behind the Baltimore Orioles. After the regular season's conclusion, they participated in the first Temple Cup competition against the first-place Orioles, sweeping the Orioles four games to none. During the season, the Giants scored 962 runs, the most in franchise history.

== Offseason ==
- February 27, 1894: Charlie Petty, Jack McMahon, and $7,500 were traded by the Giants to the Washington Senators for Duke Farrell and Jouett Meekin.

== Regular season ==
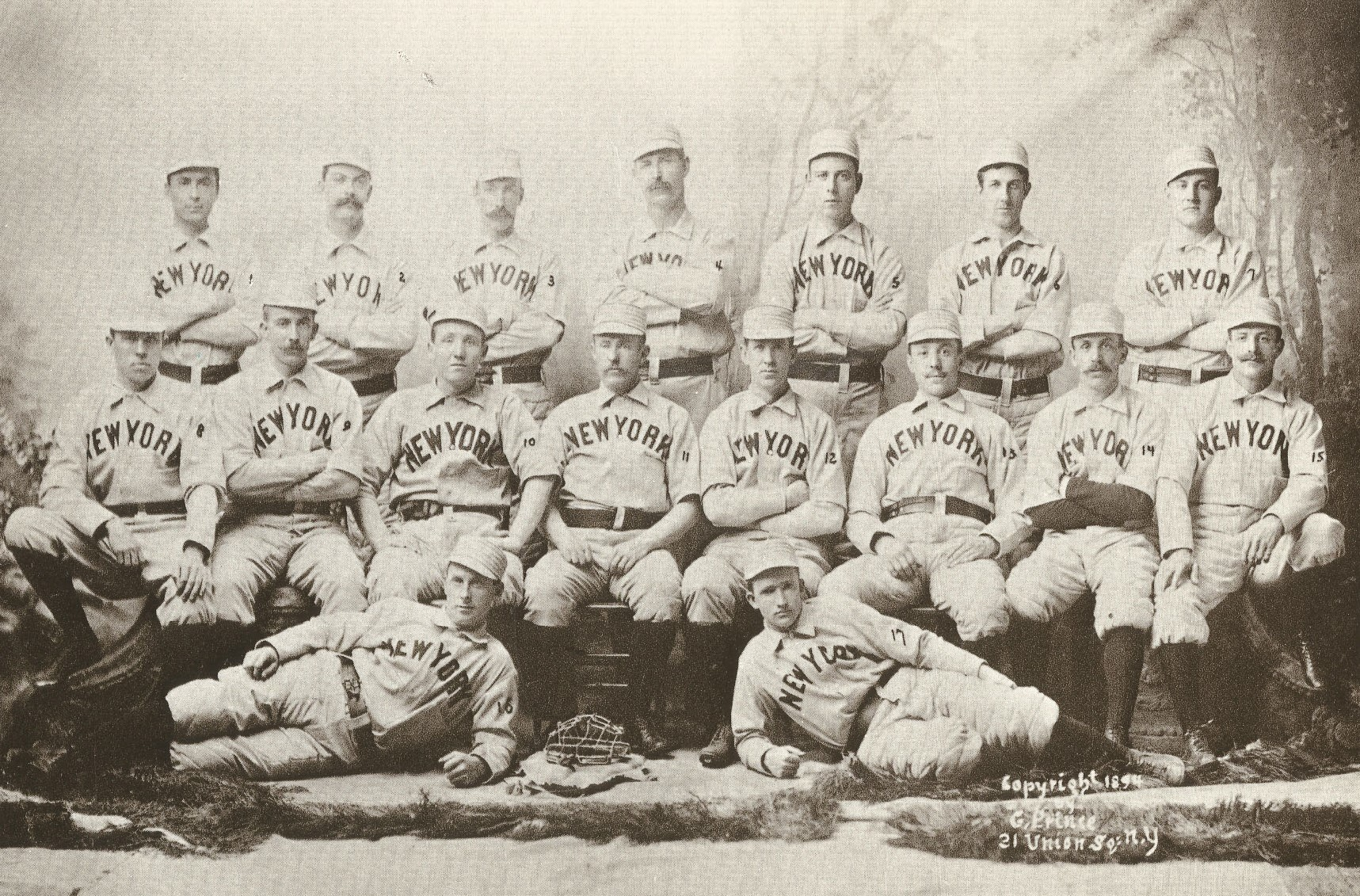
1894 New York Giants

=== Season standings ===
National League
Team	W	L	Pct.	GB	Home	Road
Baltimore Orioles	89	39	.695	—	52‍–‍15	37‍–‍24
New York Giants	88	44	.667	3	49‍–‍17	39‍–‍27
Boston Beaneaters	83	49	.629	8	44‍–‍19	39‍–‍30
Philadelphia Phillies	71	57	.555	18	48‍–‍20	23‍–‍37
Brooklyn Grooms	70	61	.534	20½	42‍–‍24	28‍–‍37
Cleveland Spiders	68	61	.527	21½	35‍–‍24	33‍–‍37
Pittsburgh Pirates	65	65	.500	25	46‍–‍28	19‍–‍37
Chicago Colts	57	75	.432	34	35‍–‍30	22‍–‍45
St. Louis Browns	56	76	.424	35	34‍–‍32	22‍–‍44
Cincinnati Reds	55	75	.423	35	37‍–‍28	18‍–‍47
Washington Senators	45	87	.341	46	32‍–‍30	13‍–‍57
Louisville Colonels	36	94	.277	54	24‍–‍38	12‍–‍56

=== Record vs. opponents ===
1894 National League record Sources:
Team	BAL	BSN	BRO	CHI	CIN	CLE	LOU	NYG	PHI	PIT	STL	WAS
Baltimore	—	4–8	8–4	9–3	10–2	9–3	10–2	6–6	6–4–1	6–4	10–2	11–1
Boston	8–4	—	6–6	7–5	8–4	9–3	10–2	6–6–1	6–6	8–4	6–6	9–3
Brooklyn	4–8	6–6	—	6–6–1	6–6	6–5	8–4	5–7–1	5–7–1	7–5–1	8–4	9–3
Chicago	3–9	5–7	6–6–1	—	6–6–1	2–10	8–4	1–11–2	7–5	6–6–1	6–6	7–5
Cincinnati	2–10	4–8	6–6	6–6–1	—	3–8–1	7–5	5–7	3–8–2	5–7	7–5	7–5
Cleveland	3–9	3–9	5–6	10–2	8–3–1	—	8–3	3–9	7–5	4–8	9–3	8–4
Louisville	2–10	2–10	4–8	4–8	5–7	3–8	—	0–12–1	3–8	3–9	6–6	4–8
New York	6–6	6–6–1	7–5–1	11–1–2	7–5	9–3	12–0–1	—	5–7	8–4–1	7–5–1	10–2
Philadelphia	4–6–1	6–6	7–5–1	5–7	8–3–2	5–7	8–3	7–5	—	8–4	5–7	8–4
Pittsburgh	4–6	4–8	5–7–1	6–6–1	7–5	8–4	9–3	4–8–1	4–8	—	6–6	8–4
St. Louis	2–10	6–6	4–8	6–6	5–7	3–9	6–6	5–7–1	7–5	6–6	—	6–6
Washington	1–11	3–9	3–9	5–7	5–7	4–8	8–4	2–10	4–8	4–8	6–6	—

=== Roster ===
1894 New York Giants
Roster
Pitchers: Dad Clarke; Les German; Jouett Meekin; Amos Rusie; Huyler Westervelt	Catchers: Duke Farrell; Parke Wilson; Infielders: Roger Connor; George Davis; Jack Doyle; Shorty Fuller; Yale Murphy; General Stafford; John Ward	Outfielders: Eddie Burke; Mike Tiernan; George Van Haltren	Manager: John Ward

== Player stats ==
=== Batting ===
==== Starters by position ====
Note: Pos = Position; G = Games played; AB = At bats; H = Hits; Avg. = Batting average; HR = Home runs; RBI = Runs batted in

Pos	Player	G	AB	H	Avg.	HR	RBI
C	Duke Farrell	116	404	116	.287	5	70
1B	Jack Doyle	107	427	157	.368	3	103
2B	John Ward	138	549	146	.266	0	79
SS	Shorty Fuller	95	377	104	.276	2	47
3B	George Davis	124	486	171	.352	9	93
OF	Eddie Burke	138	574	176	.307	4	77
OF	Mike Tiernan	113	429	120	.280	5	79
OF	George Van Haltren	139	528	175	.331	7	105

==== Other batters ====
Note: G = Games played; AB = At bats; H = Hits; Avg. = Batting average; HR = Home runs; RBI = Runs batted in

Player	G	AB	H	Avg.	HR	RBI
Yale Murphy	75	283	77	.272	0	28
Parke Wilson	51	181	59	.326	1	34
Roger Connor	22	82	24	.293	1	14
General Stafford	14	46	10	.217	0	4

=== Pitching ===
==== Starting pitchers ====
Note: G = Games pitched; IP = Innings pitched; W = Wins; L = Losses; ERA = Earned run average; SO = Strikeouts

Player	G	IP	W	L	ERA	SO
Amos Rusie	54	444.0	36	13	2.78	195
Jouett Meekin	53	418.0	33	9	3.70	137

==== Other pitchers ====
Note: G = Games pitched; IP = Innings pitched; W = Wins; L = Losses; ERA = Earned run average; SO = Strikeouts

Player	G	IP	W	L	ERA	SO
Les German	24	143.0	9	8	5.54	21
Huyler Westervelt	23	141.0	7	10	5.04	35
Dad Clarke	15	84.0	3	4	4.93	15
