= Pfann =

Pfann may refer to one of the following individuals:

- Bill Pfann (1863–1904), American professional baseball player
- George Pfann (1902–1996), American football player and coach
- Hans Pfann (1920–2021), German Olympic gymnast
- William Gardner Pfann (1917–1982), American inventor and materials scientist
