= 1894 Washington Senators season =

1894 Washington Senators
- League: National League
- Ballpark: Boundary Field
- City: Washington, D.C.
- Record: 45–87 (.341)
- League place: 11th
- Owners: J. Earl Wagner
- Managers: Gus Schmelz

The 1894 Washington Senators baseball team finished the season with a 45–87 record, eleventh place in the National League.

== Offseason ==
- February 27, 1894: Duke Farrell and Jouett Meekin were traded by the Senators to the New York Giants for Charlie Petty, Jack McMahon and $7,500.

== Regular season ==
=== Season standings ===
National League
Team	W	L	Pct.	GB	Home	Road
Baltimore Orioles	89	39	.695	—	52‍–‍15	37‍–‍24
New York Giants	88	44	.667	3	49‍–‍17	39‍–‍27
Boston Beaneaters	83	49	.629	8	44‍–‍19	39‍–‍30
Philadelphia Phillies	71	57	.555	18	48‍–‍20	23‍–‍37
Brooklyn Grooms	70	61	.534	20½	42‍–‍24	28‍–‍37
Cleveland Spiders	68	61	.527	21½	35‍–‍24	33‍–‍37
Pittsburgh Pirates	65	65	.500	25	46‍–‍28	19‍–‍37
Chicago Colts	57	75	.432	34	35‍–‍30	22‍–‍45
St. Louis Browns	56	76	.424	35	34‍–‍32	22‍–‍44
Cincinnati Reds	55	75	.423	35	37‍–‍28	18‍–‍47
Washington Senators	45	87	.341	46	32‍–‍30	13‍–‍57
Louisville Colonels	36	94	.277	54	24‍–‍38	12‍–‍56

=== Record vs. opponents ===
1894 National League record Sources:
Team	BAL	BSN	BRO	CHI	CIN	CLE	LOU	NYG	PHI	PIT	STL	WAS
Baltimore	—	4–8	8–4	9–3	10–2	9–3	10–2	6–6	6–4–1	6–4	10–2	11–1
Boston	8–4	—	6–6	7–5	8–4	9–3	10–2	6–6–1	6–6	8–4	6–6	9–3
Brooklyn	4–8	6–6	—	6–6–1	6–6	6–5	8–4	5–7–1	5–7–1	7–5–1	8–4	9–3
Chicago	3–9	5–7	6–6–1	—	6–6–1	2–10	8–4	1–11–2	7–5	6–6–1	6–6	7–5
Cincinnati	2–10	4–8	6–6	6–6–1	—	3–8–1	7–5	5–7	3–8–2	5–7	7–5	7–5
Cleveland	3–9	3–9	5–6	10–2	8–3–1	—	8–3	3–9	7–5	4–8	9–3	8–4
Louisville	2–10	2–10	4–8	4–8	5–7	3–8	—	0–12–1	3–8	3–9	6–6	4–8
New York	6–6	6–6–1	7–5–1	11–1–2	7–5	9–3	12–0–1	—	5–7	8–4–1	7–5–1	10–2
Philadelphia	4–6–1	6–6	7–5–1	5–7	8–3–2	5–7	8–3	7–5	—	8–4	5–7	8–4
Pittsburgh	4–6	4–8	5–7–1	6–6–1	7–5	8–4	9–3	4–8–1	4–8	—	6–6	8–4
St. Louis	2–10	6–6	4–8	6–6	5–7	3–9	6–6	5–7–1	7–5	6–6	—	6–6
Washington	1–11	3–9	3–9	5–7	5–7	4–8	8–4	2–10	4–8	4–8	6–6	—

=== Notable transactions ===
- August 15, 1894: Tim O'Rourke was released by the Senators.

=== Roster ===
1894 Washington Senators
Roster
Pitchers: Varney Anderson; Rip Egan; Duke Esper; George Haddock; John Malarkey; Al Maul; Win Mercer; Charlie Petty; Ben Stephens; Otis Stocksdale; Mike Sullivan; Bill Wynne	Catchers: Dan Dugdale; Deacon McGuire; Infielders: Ed Cartwright; Bill Joyce; Kid Mohler; Tim O'Rourke; Paul Radford; Frank Scheibeck; Joe Sullivan; Piggy Ward	Outfielders: Charlie Abbey; Jake Boyd; Count Campau; Bill Hassamaer; Kip Selbach; George Tebeau	Manager: Gus Schmelz

== Player stats ==
=== Batting ===
==== Starters by position ====
Note: Pos = Position; G = Games played; AB = At bats; H = Hits; Avg. = Batting average; HR = Home runs; RBI = Runs batted in

Pos	Player	G	AB	H	Avg.	HR	RBI
C	Deacon McGuire	104	425	130	.306	6	78
1B	Ed Cartwright	132	507	149	.294	12	106
2B	Piggy Ward	98	347	105	.303	0	36
SS	Frank Scheibeck	52	196	45	.230	0	17
3B	Bill Joyce	99	355	126	.355	17	89
OF	Kip Selbach	97	372	114	.306	7	71
OF	Bill Hassamaer	118	494	159	.322	4	90
OF	Charlie Abbey	129	523	164	.314	7	101

==== Other batters ====
Note: G = Games played; AB = At bats; H = Hits; Avg. = Batting average; HR = Home runs; RBI = Runs batted in

Player	G	AB	H	Avg.	HR	RBI
Paul Radford	95	325	78	.240	0	49
George Tebeau	61	222	50	.225	0	28
Dan Dugdale	38	134	32	.239	0	16
Joe Sullivan	17	60	15	.250	0	5
Tim O'Rourke	7	25	5	.200	0	2
Jake Boyd	6	21	3	.143	0	1
Kid Mohler	3	9	1	.111	0	0
Count Campau	2	7	1	.143	0	0

=== Pitching ===
==== Starting pitchers ====
Note: G = Games pitched; IP = Innings pitched; W = Wins; L = Losses; ERA = Earned run average; SO = Strikeouts

Player	G	IP	W	L	ERA	SO
Win Mercer	50	339.1	17	23	3.85	72
Al Maul	29	204.2	11	15	5.94	34
Otis Stocksdale	18	117.1	5	9	5.06	10
Duke Esper	18	116.0	5	10	7.45	24
Charlie Petty	16	103.0	3	8	5.59	14
George Haddock	4	29.0	0	4	8.69	1
John Malarkey	3	26.0	2	1	4.15	3
Jake Boyd	3	19.0	0	3	8.53	3
Varney Anderson	2	14.0	0	2	7.07	3
Bill Wynne	1	8.0	0	1	6.75	2

==== Other pitchers ====
Note: G = Games pitched; IP = Innings pitched; W = Wins; L = Losses; ERA = Earned run average; SO = Strikeouts

Player	G	IP	W	L	ERA	SO
Mike Sullivan	20	117.2	2	10	6.58	21
Ben Stephens	3	11.0	0	0	4.91	1

==== Relief pitchers ====
Note: G = Games pitched; W = Wins; L = Losses; SV = Saves; ERA = Earned run average; SO = Strikeouts

Player	G	W	L	SV	ERA	SO
Rip Egan	1	0	0	0	10.80	2
