= George Paynter =

George Paynter may refer to:

- George Paynter (baseball) (1871–1950)
- George Paynter (British Army officer) (1880–1950)
