= Thomas Maguire =

Thomas Maguire may refer to:

- Thomas Maguire (priest) (1776–1854), Canadian Roman Catholic priest
- Thomas Aquinas Maguire, author and illustrator
- Thomas Herbert Maguire (1821–1895), English artist and engraver
- Thomas Maguire (baseball), American baseball pitcher for the 1894 Cincinnati Reds
- Thomas H. Maguire (1877–1915), American football coach and physician
- Thomas P. Maguire (1947–2024), officer in the United States Air Force
- Thomas Maguire, convicted of murder, but overturned; see Manchester Martyrs
- Tom Maguire (1892–1993), Irish republican
- Tom Maguire (socialist) (1860s–1895), British socialist, trade union organiser and poet from Leeds
- Tom Maguire (footballer) (1873–1944), Australian rules footballer
