= 1894 Cleveland Spiders season =

1894 Cleveland Spiders
- League: National League
- Ballpark: League Park
- City: Cleveland, Ohio
- Record: 68–61 (.527)
- League place: 6th
- Owners: Frank Robison
- Managers: Patsy Tebeau

The 1894 Cleveland Spiders finished with a 68–61 record. Good for sixth place in the National League.

== Regular season ==
=== Season standings ===
National League
Team	W	L	Pct.	GB	Home	Road
Baltimore Orioles	89	39	.695	—	52‍–‍15	37‍–‍24
New York Giants	88	44	.667	3	49‍–‍17	39‍–‍27
Boston Beaneaters	83	49	.629	8	44‍–‍19	39‍–‍30
Philadelphia Phillies	71	57	.555	18	48‍–‍20	23‍–‍37
Brooklyn Grooms	70	61	.534	20½	42‍–‍24	28‍–‍37
Cleveland Spiders	68	61	.527	21½	35‍–‍24	33‍–‍37
Pittsburgh Pirates	65	65	.500	25	46‍–‍28	19‍–‍37
Chicago Colts	57	75	.432	34	35‍–‍30	22‍–‍45
St. Louis Browns	56	76	.424	35	34‍–‍32	22‍–‍44
Cincinnati Reds	55	75	.423	35	37‍–‍28	18‍–‍47
Washington Senators	45	87	.341	46	32‍–‍30	13‍–‍57
Louisville Colonels	36	94	.277	54	24‍–‍38	12‍–‍56

=== Record vs. opponents ===
1894 National League record Sources:
Team	BAL	BSN	BRO	CHI	CIN	CLE	LOU	NYG	PHI	PIT	STL	WAS
Baltimore	—	4–8	8–4	9–3	10–2	9–3	10–2	6–6	6–4–1	6–4	10–2	11–1
Boston	8–4	—	6–6	7–5	8–4	9–3	10–2	6–6–1	6–6	8–4	6–6	9–3
Brooklyn	4–8	6–6	—	6–6–1	6–6	6–5	8–4	5–7–1	5–7–1	7–5–1	8–4	9–3
Chicago	3–9	5–7	6–6–1	—	6–6–1	2–10	8–4	1–11–2	7–5	6–6–1	6–6	7–5
Cincinnati	2–10	4–8	6–6	6–6–1	—	3–8–1	7–5	5–7	3–8–2	5–7	7–5	7–5
Cleveland	3–9	3–9	5–6	10–2	8–3–1	—	8–3	3–9	7–5	4–8	9–3	8–4
Louisville	2–10	2–10	4–8	4–8	5–7	3–8	—	0–12–1	3–8	3–9	6–6	4–8
New York	6–6	6–6–1	7–5–1	11–1–2	7–5	9–3	12–0–1	—	5–7	8–4–1	7–5–1	10–2
Philadelphia	4–6–1	6–6	7–5–1	5–7	8–3–2	5–7	8–3	7–5	—	8–4	5–7	8–4
Pittsburgh	4–6	4–8	5–7–1	6–6–1	7–5	8–4	9–3	4–8–1	4–8	—	6–6	8–4
St. Louis	2–10	6–6	4–8	6–6	5–7	3–9	6–6	5–7–1	7–5	6–6	—	6–6
Washington	1–11	3–9	3–9	5–7	5–7	4–8	8–4	2–10	4–8	4–8	6–6	—

=== Notable transactions ===
- August 1894: Charlie Petty was released by the Spiders.

=== Roster ===
1894 Cleveland Spiders
Roster
Pitchers: John Clarkson; George Cuppy; Chauncey Fisher; Frank Griffith; Frank Knauss; John Lyston; Tony Mullane; Charlie Petty; Mike Sullivan; Tom Thomas; Bobby Wallace; Cy Young	Catchers: Jack O'Connor; Chief Zimmer; Infielders: Cupid Childs; Chippy McGarr; Ed McKean; Patsy Tebeau	Outfielders: Harry Blake; Jesse Burkett; Buck Ewing; Jimmy McAleer; George Tebeau; Jake Virtue	Manager: Patsy Tebeau

== Player stats ==
=== Batting ===
==== Starters by position ====
Note: Pos = Position; G = Games played; AB = At bats; H = Hits; Avg. = Batting average; HR = Home runs; RBI = Runs batted in

Pos	Player	G	AB	H	Avg.	HR	RBI
C	Chief Zimmer	90	341	97	.284	4	65
1B	Patsy Tebeau	125	523	158	.302	3	89
2B	Cupid Childs	118	479	169	.353	2	52
SS	Ed McKean	130	554	198	.357	8	128
3B	Chippy McGarr	128	523	144	.275	2	74
OF	Jimmy McAleer	64	253	73	.289	2	40
OF	Jesse Burkett	125	523	187	.358	8	94
OF	Harry Blake	73	296	78	.264	1	51

==== Other batters ====
Note: G = Games played; AB = At bats; H = Hits; Avg. = Batting average; HR = Home runs; RBI = Runs batted in

Player	G	AB	H	Avg.	HR	RBI
Jack O'Connor	86	330	104	.315	2	51
Buck Ewing	53	211	53	.251	2	39
George Tebeau	40	150	47	.313	0	25
Jake Virtue	29	89	23	.258	0	10

=== Pitching ===
==== Starting pitchers ====
Note: G = Games pitched; IP = Innings pitched; W = Wins; L = Losses; ERA = Earned run average; SO = Strikeouts

Player	G	IP	W	L	ERA	SO
Cy Young	52	408.2	26	21	3.94	108
George Cuppy	43	316.0	24	15	4.56	65
John Clarkson	22	150.2	8	10	4.42	28
Mike Sullivan	13	90.2	6	5	6.35	19
Frank Griffith	7	42.1	1	2	9.99	15
Tony Mullane	4	33.0	1	2	7.64	3
Frank Knauss	2	11.0	0	1	5.73	2
John Lyston	1	3.2	0	0	9.82	0

==== Other pitchers ====
Note: G = Games pitched; IP = Innings pitched; W = Wins; L = Losses; ERA = Earned run average; SO = Strikeouts

Player	G	IP	W	L	ERA	SO
Charlie Petty	4	27.0	0	2	8.67	4
Bobby Wallace	4	26.0	2	1	5.19	10
Chauncey Fisher	3	11.0	0	2	11.45	0

==== Relief pitchers ====
Note: G = Games pitched; W = Wins; L = Losses; SV = Saves; ERA = Earned run average; SO = Strikeouts

Player	G	W	L	SV	ERA	SO
Jesse Burkett	1	0	0	0	4.50	0
Tom Thomas	1	0	0	1	27.00	0
Jake Virtue	1	0	0	0	----	0
