= Gene Steere =

American baseball player (1872–1942)

- Shortstop
- Born: August 16, 1872; South Scituate, Rhode Island, U.S.
- Died: March 13, 1942 (aged 69); San Mateo, California, U.S.
- Batted: Unknown Threw: Unknown

MLB debut
- August 29, 1894, for the Pittsburgh Pirates

Last MLB appearance
- September 15, 1894, for the Pittsburgh Pirates

MLB statistics
- Batting average: .205
- Home runs: 0
- Runs batted in: 4
- Stats at Baseball Reference

Teams
- Pittsburgh Pirates (1894)

Frederick Eugene Steere (August 16, 1872 – March 13, 1942) was an American Major League Baseball player. Steere played for the Pittsburgh Pirates in the 1894 season. In 10 games, Steere had eight hits in 39 at-bats. He attended Brown University.

Steere was born in South Scituate, Rhode Island and died in San Francisco, California.
