= 1894 Chicago Colts season =

1894 Chicago Colts
- League: National League
- Ballpark: West Side Park
- City: Chicago
- Record: 57–75 (.432)
- League place: 8th
- Owners: Albert Spalding
- Managers: Cap Anson

The 1894 Chicago Colts season was the 23rd season of the Chicago Colts franchise, the 19th in the National League and the second at West Side Park. The Colts finished eighth in the National League with a record of 57–75.

== Regular season ==
=== Season standings ===
National League
Team	W	L	Pct.	GB	Home	Road
Baltimore Orioles	89	39	.695	—	52‍–‍15	37‍–‍24
New York Giants	88	44	.667	3	49‍–‍17	39‍–‍27
Boston Beaneaters	83	49	.629	8	44‍–‍19	39‍–‍30
Philadelphia Phillies	71	57	.555	18	48‍–‍20	23‍–‍37
Brooklyn Grooms	70	61	.534	20½	42‍–‍24	28‍–‍37
Cleveland Spiders	68	61	.527	21½	35‍–‍24	33‍–‍37
Pittsburgh Pirates	65	65	.500	25	46‍–‍28	19‍–‍37
Chicago Colts	57	75	.432	34	35‍–‍30	22‍–‍45
St. Louis Browns	56	76	.424	35	34‍–‍32	22‍–‍44
Cincinnati Reds	55	75	.423	35	37‍–‍28	18‍–‍47
Washington Senators	45	87	.341	46	32‍–‍30	13‍–‍57
Louisville Colonels	36	94	.277	54	24‍–‍38	12‍–‍56

=== Record vs. opponents ===
1894 National League record Sources:
Team	BAL	BSN	BRO	CHI	CIN	CLE	LOU	NYG	PHI	PIT	STL	WAS
Baltimore	—	4–8	8–4	9–3	10–2	9–3	10–2	6–6	6–4–1	6–4	10–2	11–1
Boston	8–4	—	6–6	7–5	8–4	9–3	10–2	6–6–1	6–6	8–4	6–6	9–3
Brooklyn	4–8	6–6	—	6–6–1	6–6	6–5	8–4	5–7–1	5–7–1	7–5–1	8–4	9–3
Chicago	3–9	5–7	6–6–1	—	6–6–1	2–10	8–4	1–11–2	7–5	6–6–1	6–6	7–5
Cincinnati	2–10	4–8	6–6	6–6–1	—	3–8–1	7–5	5–7	3–8–2	5–7	7–5	7–5
Cleveland	3–9	3–9	5–6	10–2	8–3–1	—	8–3	3–9	7–5	4–8	9–3	8–4
Louisville	2–10	2–10	4–8	4–8	5–7	3–8	—	0–12–1	3–8	3–9	6–6	4–8
New York	6–6	6–6–1	7–5–1	11–1–2	7–5	9–3	12–0–1	—	5–7	8–4–1	7–5–1	10–2
Philadelphia	4–6–1	6–6	7–5–1	5–7	8–3–2	5–7	8–3	7–5	—	8–4	5–7	8–4
Pittsburgh	4–6	4–8	5–7–1	6–6–1	7–5	8–4	9–3	4–8–1	4–8	—	6–6	8–4
St. Louis	2–10	6–6	4–8	6–6	5–7	3–9	6–6	5–7–1	7–5	6–6	—	6–6
Washington	1–11	3–9	3–9	5–7	5–7	4–8	8–4	2–10	4–8	4–8	6–6	—

== Roster ==
1894 Chicago Colts
Roster
Pitchers: Bert Abbey; Kid Camp; Fritz Clausen; Frank Donnelly; Clark Griffith; Bill Hutchison; Willie McGill; Scott Stratton; Adonis Terry	Catchers: Malachi Kittridge; Pop Schriver; Infielders: Cap Anson; Lew Camp; Bill Dahlen; George Decker; John Houseman; Charlie Irwin; Jiggs Parrott	Outfielders: Sam Dungan; Bill Lange; Jimmy Ryan; Walt Wilmot	Manager: Cap Anson

== Player stats ==
=== Batting ===
==== Starters by position ====
Note: Pos = Position; G = Games played; AB = At bats; H = Hits; Avg. = Batting average; HR = Home runs; RBI = Runs batted in

Pos	Player	G	AB	H	Avg.	HR	RBI
C	Pop Schriver	98	354	97	.274	3	49
1B	Cap Anson	83	340	132	.388	5	99
2B	Jiggs Parrott	126	525	130	.248	3	65
SS	Bill Dahlen	122	507	182	.359	15	108
3B	Charlie Irwin	130	504	149	.296	8	100
OF	Walt Wilmot	135	604	199	.329	5	130
OF	Jimmy Ryan	110	482	172	.357	3	62
OF	Bill Lange	113	449	146	.325	6	91

==== Other batters ====
Note: G = Games played; AB = At bats; H = Hits; Avg. = Batting average; HR = Home runs; RBI = Runs batted in

Player	G	AB	H	Avg.	HR	RBI
George Decker	93	393	122	.310	8	93
Malachi Kittridge	51	168	53	.315	0	23
Sam Dungan	10	39	9	.231	0	3
Lew Camp	8	33	6	.182	0	1
John Houseman	4	15	6	.400	0	4

=== Pitching ===
==== Starting pitchers ====
Note: G = Games pitched; IP = Innings pitched; W = Wins; L = Losses; ERA = Earned run average; SO = Strikeouts

Player	G	IP	W	L	ERA	SO
Bill Hutchison	37	279.0	14	16	6.03	60
Clark Griffith	36	261.1	21	14	4.92	71
Willie McGill	27	208.0	7	19	5.84	58
Adonis Terry	23	163.1	5	11	5.84	39
Scott Stratton	16	128.1	8	5	5.89	24
Bert Abbey	11	92.0	2	7	5.18	24
Fritz Clausen	2	4.1	0	1	14.54	1

==== Other pitchers ====
Note: G = Games pitched; IP = Innings pitched; W = Wins; L = Losses; ERA = Earned run average; SO = Strikeouts

Player	G	IP	W	L	ERA	SO
Kid Camp	3	22.0	0	1	6.55	6

==== Relief pitchers ====
Note: G = Games pitched; W = Wins; L = Losses; SV = Saves; ERA = Earned run average; SO = Strikeouts

Player	G	W	L	SV	ERA	SO
Frank Donnelly	1	0	0	0	15.43	1
