= Jimmy Bannon =

American baseball player (1871–1948)

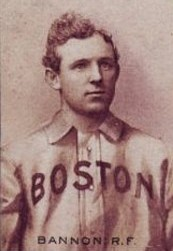
- Outfielder
- Born: May 5, 1871; Amesbury, Massachusetts, U.S.
- Died: March 24, 1948 (aged 76); Glen Rock, New Jersey, U.S.
- Batted: Right Threw: Right

MLB debut
- June 15, 1893, for the St. Louis Browns

Last MLB appearance
- August 12, 1896, for the Boston Beaneaters

MLB statistics
- Batting average: .320
- Home runs: 19
- Runs batted in: 253
- Stats at Baseball Reference

Teams
- St. Louis Browns (1893); Boston Beaneaters (1894–1896)

James Henry "Foxy Grandpa" Bannon (May 5, 1871 – March 24, 1948) was an American Major League Baseball player for the St. Louis Browns and Boston Beaneaters. Bannon was primarily an outfielder, though he played a few games as an infielder and pitched in three games. He stood at 5'5".

== Biography ==
Bannon was born in Amesbury, Massachusetts, grew up in Saugus, Massachusetts, and attended the College of the Holy Cross, where he was a pitcher for the baseball team. He played in the New England League in 1890.

In 1893, Bannon started his major league career with the St. Louis Browns. He hit well, and after the season, he signed with the Boston Beaneaters. There, he joined future Hall of Famers Hugh Duffy and Tommy McCarthy in the outfield. In 1894, Bannon batted .336 with 130 runs scored and 114 runs batted in for the powerful Boston offense. He also performed well defensively, leading all National League outfielders with 43 assists. In 1895, he batted a career-high .347. He also helped turn 12 double plays, tied for second-most double plays turned by a right fielder in a single season.

Bannon slumped badly in 1896, though, and he was released in August. In four years, he appeared in a total of 367 major league games, achieving a lifetime .320 batting average with 19 home runs and 253 RBI. Bannon then went down to the minors. From 1899 to 1902, he played for Toronto in the Eastern League. In 1899, he led the league with a .341 batting average. He continued playing until 1910 and also managed in five different seasons.

After his playing career was over, Bannon served as a baseball coach at Lehigh University and the University of New Hampshire. He was also president of the New England League.

Bannon died in 1948, at the age of 76.
