= 1894 Brooklyn Grooms season =

1894 Brooklyn Grooms
- League: National League
- Ballpark: Eastern Park
- City: Brooklyn, New York
- Record: 70–61 (.534)
- League place: 5th
- Owners: Charles Byrne, Ferdinand Abell, George Chauncey
- President: Charles Byrne
- Managers: Dave Foutz

The 1894 Brooklyn Grooms finished in fifth place in a crowded National League pennant race.

== Offseason ==
- January 1, 1984: Dan Brouthers and Willie Keeler were traded by the Grooms to the Baltimore Orioles for Billy Shindle and George Treadway.
- March 15, 1894: Danny Richardson was sold by the Grooms to the Louisville Colonels.

== Regular season ==
=== Season standings ===
National League
| Team | W | L | Pct. | GB | Home | Road |
|---|---|---|---|---|---|---|
| Baltimore Orioles | 89 | 39 | .695 | — | 52‍–‍15 | 37‍–‍24 |
| New York Giants | 88 | 44 | .667 | 3 | 49‍–‍17 | 39‍–‍27 |
| Boston Beaneaters | 83 | 49 | .629 | 8 | 44‍–‍19 | 39‍–‍30 |
| Philadelphia Phillies | 71 | 57 | .555 | 18 | 48‍–‍20 | 23‍–‍37 |
| Brooklyn Grooms | 70 | 61 | .534 | 20½ | 42‍–‍24 | 28‍–‍37 |
| Cleveland Spiders | 68 | 61 | .527 | 21½ | 35‍–‍24 | 33‍–‍37 |
| Pittsburgh Pirates | 65 | 65 | .500 | 25 | 46‍–‍28 | 19‍–‍37 |
| Chicago Colts | 57 | 75 | .432 | 34 | 35‍–‍30 | 22‍–‍45 |
| St. Louis Browns | 56 | 76 | .424 | 35 | 34‍–‍32 | 22‍–‍44 |
| Cincinnati Reds | 55 | 75 | .423 | 35 | 37‍–‍28 | 18‍–‍47 |
| Washington Senators | 45 | 87 | .341 | 46 | 32‍–‍30 | 13‍–‍57 |
| Louisville Colonels | 36 | 94 | .277 | 54 | 24‍–‍38 | 12‍–‍56 |

=== Record vs. opponents ===
1894 National League record Sources:
| Team | BAL | BSN | BRO | CHI | CIN | CLE | LOU | NYG | PHI | PIT | STL | WAS |
|---|---|---|---|---|---|---|---|---|---|---|---|---|
| Baltimore | — | 4–8 | 8–4 | 9–3 | 10–2 | 9–3 | 10–2 | 6–6 | 6–4–1 | 6–4 | 10–2 | 11–1 |
| Boston | 8–4 | — | 6–6 | 7–5 | 8–4 | 9–3 | 10–2 | 6–6–1 | 6–6 | 8–4 | 6–6 | 9–3 |
| Brooklyn | 4–8 | 6–6 | — | 6–6–1 | 6–6 | 6–5 | 8–4 | 5–7–1 | 5–7–1 | 7–5–1 | 8–4 | 9–3 |
| Chicago | 3–9 | 5–7 | 6–6–1 | — | 6–6–1 | 2–10 | 8–4 | 1–11–2 | 7–5 | 6–6–1 | 6–6 | 7–5 |
| Cincinnati | 2–10 | 4–8 | 6–6 | 6–6–1 | — | 3–8–1 | 7–5 | 5–7 | 3–8–2 | 5–7 | 7–5 | 7–5 |
| Cleveland | 3–9 | 3–9 | 5–6 | 10–2 | 8–3–1 | — | 8–3 | 3–9 | 7–5 | 4–8 | 9–3 | 8–4 |
| Louisville | 2–10 | 2–10 | 4–8 | 4–8 | 5–7 | 3–8 | — | 0–12–1 | 3–8 | 3–9 | 6–6 | 4–8 |
| New York | 6–6 | 6–6–1 | 7–5–1 | 11–1–2 | 7–5 | 9–3 | 12–0–1 | — | 5–7 | 8–4–1 | 7–5–1 | 10–2 |
| Philadelphia | 4–6–1 | 6–6 | 7–5–1 | 5–7 | 8–3–2 | 5–7 | 8–3 | 7–5 | — | 8–4 | 5–7 | 8–4 |
| Pittsburgh | 4–6 | 4–8 | 5–7–1 | 6–6–1 | 7–5 | 8–4 | 9–3 | 4–8–1 | 4–8 | — | 6–6 | 8–4 |
| St. Louis | 2–10 | 6–6 | 4–8 | 6–6 | 5–7 | 3–9 | 6–6 | 5–7–1 | 7–5 | 6–6 | — | 6–6 |
| Washington | 1–11 | 3–9 | 3–9 | 5–7 | 5–7 | 4–8 | 8–4 | 2–10 | 4–8 | 4–8 | 6–6 | — |

=== Roster ===
1894 Brooklyn Grooms
Roster
| Pitchers: Dan Daub; Hank Gastright; Brickyard Kennedy; Jim Korwan; Con Lucid; George Sharrott; Andy Sommerville; Ed Stein; Fred Underwood | Catchers: Con Daily; Billy Earle; Tom Kinslow; Infielders: Tommy Corcoran; Tom Daly; Pete Gilbert; Dave Foutz; Candy LaChance; Billy Shindle | Outfielders: John Anderson; Pete Browning; Oyster Burns; Mike Griffin; George Shoch; George Treadway | Manager: Dave Foutz |

== Player stats ==
=== Batting ===
==== Starters by position ====
Note: Pos = Position; G = Games played; AB = At bats; R = Runs; H = Hits; Avg. = Batting average; HR = Home runs; RBI = Runs batted in; SB = Stolen bases

| Pos | Player | G | AB | R | H | Avg. | HR | RBI | SB |
|---|---|---|---|---|---|---|---|---|---|
| C | Tom Kinslow | 62 | 223 | 39 | 68 | .305 | 2 | 41 | 4 |
| 1B | Dave Foutz | 72 | 293 | 40 | 90 | .307 | 0 | 51 | 14 |
| 2B | Tom Daly | 123 | 492 | 135 | 168 | .341 | 8 | 82 | 51 |
| 3B | Billy Shindle | 116 | 476 | 94 | 141 | .296 | 4 | 96 | 19 |
| SS | Tommy Corcoran | 129 | 576 | 123 | 173 | .300 | 5 | 92 | 33 |
| OF | Oyster Burns | 125 | 505 | 106 | 179 | .354 | 5 | 107 | 30 |
| OF | George Treadway | 123 | 479 | 124 | 157 | .328 | 4 | 102 | 27 |
| OF | Mike Griffin | 107 | 402 | 122 | 144 | .358 | 5 | 57 | 39 |

==== Other batters ====
Note: G = Games played; AB = At bats; R = Runs; H = Hits; Avg. = Batting average; HR = Home runs; RBI = Runs batted in; SB = Stolen bases

| Player | G | AB | R | H | Avg. | HR | RBI | SB |
|---|---|---|---|---|---|---|---|---|
| Candy LaChance | 68 | 257 | 48 | 83 | .323 | 5 | 52 | 20 |
| George Shoch | 64 | 239 | 47 | 77 | .322 | 1 | 37 | 16 |
| Con Daily | 67 | 234 | 40 | 60 | .256 | 0 | 32 | 8 |
| John Anderson | 17 | 63 | 14 | 19 | .302 | 1 | 19 | 7 |
| Billy Earle | 14 | 50 | 13 | 17 | .340 | 0 | 6 | 4 |
| Pete Gilbert | 6 | 25 | 1 | 2 | .080 | 0 | 1 | 2 |
| Pete Browning | 1 | 2 | 1 | 2 | 1.000 | 0 | 2 | 0 |

=== Pitching ===
==== Starting pitchers ====
Note: G = Games pitched; GS = Games started; IP = Innings pitched; W = Wins; L = Losses; ERA = Earned run average; BB = Bases on balls; SO = Strikeouts; CG = Complete games

| Player | G | GS | IP | W | L | ERA | BB | SO | CG |
|---|---|---|---|---|---|---|---|---|---|
| Brickyard Kennedy | 48 | 41 | 360.2 | 24 | 20 | 4.92 | 149 | 107 | 34 |
| Ed Stein | 44 | 40 | 350.0 | 26 | 14 | 4.63 | 170 | 84 | 37 |
| Dan Daub | 34 | 27 | 224.0 | 10 | 12 | 6.11 | 91 | 45 | 15 |
| Con Lucid | 10 | 9 | 71.1 | 5 | 3 | 6.56 | 44 | 15 | 7 |
| Fred Underwood | 7 | 6 | 47.0 | 2 | 4 | 7.85 | 30 | 10 | 5 |
| George Sharrott | 3 | 3 | 18.0 | 0 | 1 | 9.00 | 10 | 7 | 2 |
| Andy Sommerville | 1 | 1 | 0.1 | 0 | 1 | 162.00 | 5 | 0 | 0 |

==== Other pitchers ====
Note: G = Games pitched; GS = Games started; IP = Innings pitched; W = Wins; L = Losses; ERA = Earned run average; BB = Bases on balls; SO = Strikeouts; CG = Complete games

| Player | G | GS | IP | W | L | ERA | BB | SO | CG |
|---|---|---|---|---|---|---|---|---|---|
| Hank Gastright | 16 | 8 | 93.0 | 2 | 6 | 6.39 | 55 | 20 | 6 |

==== Relief pitchers ====
Note: G = Games pitched; IP = Innings pitched; W = Wins; L = Losses; SV = Saves; ERA = Earned run average; BB = Bases on balls; SO = Strikeouts

| Player | G | IP | W | L | SV | ERA | BB | SO |
|---|---|---|---|---|---|---|---|---|
| Jim Korwan | 1 | 5.0 | 0 | 0 | 0 | 14.40 | 5 | 2 |
| Dave Foutz | 1 | 2.0 | 0 | 0 | 0 | 13.50 | 1 | 0 |
