= Kirtley Baker =

American baseball player (1869–1927)

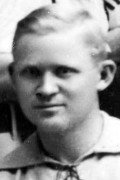
- Pitcher
- Born: June 24, 1869; Aurora, Indiana, U.S.
- Died: April 13, 1927 (aged 57); Covington, Kentucky, U.S.
- Batted: Right Threw: Right

MLB debut
- May 7, 1890, for the Pittsburgh Alleghenys

Last MLB appearance
- June 14, 1899, for the Washington Senators

MLB statistics
- Win–loss record: 9–38
- Earned run average: 6.28
- Strikeouts: 115
- Stats at Baseball Reference

Teams
- Pittsburgh Alleghenys (1890); Baltimore Orioles (1893–1894); Washington Senators (1898–1899)

Kirtley Baker (June 24, 1869 – April 15, 1927) was an American pitcher in Major League Baseball. He played for the Baltimore Orioles, Pittsburgh Alleghenys (now Pirates), and Washington Senators.

The Orioles attempted to convert Baker from pitching to hitting but was released when the short-lived experiment failed. After his career, he lived in Lawrenceburg, Indiana after his baseball career ended where he variously operated a soda fountain, candy store, movie theater and grocery store. He was also active in Freemasonry, the Knights of Pythias and Improved Order of Red Men.
