= George Stultz =

American baseball player (1873–1955)

- Pitcher
- Born: June 30, 1873; Louisville, Kentucky, U.S.
- Died: March 19, 1955 (aged 81); Louisville, Kentucky, U.S.
- Batted: Unknown Threw: Unknown

MLB debut
- September 22, 1894, for the Boston Beaneaters

Last MLB appearance
- September 22, 1894, for the Boston Beaneaters

MLB statistics
- Win–loss record: 1–0
- Earned run average: 0.00
- Strikeouts: 1
- Stats at Baseball Reference

Teams
- Boston Beaneaters (1894)

George Irvin Stultz (June 30, 1873 – March 19, 1955) was an American professional baseball player. He was a pitcher for one season (1894) with the Boston Beaneaters. He made only one major league appearance, pitching a complete-game victory, giving up no earned runs. For his career, he compiled a 1–0 record, with a 0.00 earned run average, and 1 strikeout in 9 innings pitched.

He was born and later died in Louisville, Kentucky at the age of 81.
