= Frank Griffith (baseball) =

American baseball player (1872–1908)

- Pitcher
- Born: November 18, 1872; Gilman, Illinois, U.S.
- Died: December 8, 1908 (aged 36); Waterman, Illinois, U.S.
- Batted: Left Threw: Left

MLB debut
- August 13, 1892, for the Chicago Colts

Last MLB appearance
- July 17, 1894, for the Cleveland Spiders

MLB statistics
- Win–loss record: 1–3
- Strikeouts: 18
- Earned run average: 10.10
- Stats at Baseball Reference

Teams
- Chicago Colts (1892); Cleveland Spiders (1894)

Frank Wesley Griffith (November 18, 1872 – December 8, 1908) was an American professional baseball player who pitched in the Major Leagues for the 1892 Chicago Colts and 1894 Cleveland Spiders. He played college baseball at Northwestern University. He played in the minors in 1895 and 1896.
