= Luke Lutenberg =

American baseball player (1864–1938)

- First baseman
- Born: October 4, 1864; Quincy, Illinois, U.S.
- Died: December 24, 1938 (aged 74); Jacksonville, Illinois, U.S.
- Batted: Right Threw: Right

MLB debut
- July 7, 1894, for the Louisville Colonels

Last MLB appearance
- September 30, 1894, for the Louisville Colonels

MLB statistics
- Batting average: .192
- Home runs: 0
- RBI: 23
- Stats at Baseball Reference

Teams
- Louisville Colonels (1894)

Charles William Lutenberg (October 4, 1864 – December 24, 1938) was an American Major League Baseball first baseman who played with the Louisville Colonels in 1894. His minor league career lasted through 1897.
