= Harry Jordan =

American baseball player (1873–1920)

Harry Jordan {Also See: Harry Jorden (Actor)
- Pitcher
- Born: February 14, 1873; Titusville, Pennsylvania
- Died: March 1, 1920 (aged 47); Pittsburgh, Pennsylvania
- Batted: Unknown Threw: Unknown

MLB debut
- September 25, 1894, for the Pittsburgh Pirates

Last MLB appearance
- July 5, 1895, for the Pittsburgh Pirates

MLB statistics
- Win–loss record: 1–2
- Earned run average: 4.15
- Strikeouts: 5
- Stats at Baseball Reference

Teams
- Pittsburgh Pirates (1894–1895)

Harry James Jordan (February 14, 1873 – March 1, 1920) was a professional baseball player. He pitched for the Pittsburgh Pirates of the National League during parts of the 1894 and 1895 seasons. He later played in the Eastern League in 1896 and the Interstate League in 1897 and 1898.
