= Bill Massey (baseball) =

American baseball player (1871–1940)

- First baseman
- Born: January 1871; Philadelphia, Pennsylvania, U.S.
- Died: October 9, 1940 (aged 69); Manila, Philippines
- Batted: Right Threw: Right

MLB debut
- September 8, 1894, for the Cincinnati Reds

Last MLB appearance
- September 30, 1894, for the Cincinnati Reds

MLB statistics
- Batting average: .283
- Home runs: 0
- Runs batted in: 5
- Stats at Baseball Reference

Teams
- Cincinnati Reds (1894)

William Henry Massey (January 1871 – October 9, 1940) was an American first baseman in Major League Baseball who played for the Cincinnati Reds.

== Formative years ==
Massey was born in Holmesburg, Pennsylvania in January, 1871.

== Career ==
Massey played in 13 games for the 1894 Reds during September, 1894. His minor league playing career lasted through 1909, during which he would win at least one pennant, the 1907 championship of the Connecticut League, while playing for the Holyoke Papermakers.

== Death ==
Massey died at the age of sixty-nine in the city of Manila, on October 9, 1940.
