= Harrison Peppers =

American baseball player (1866–1903)

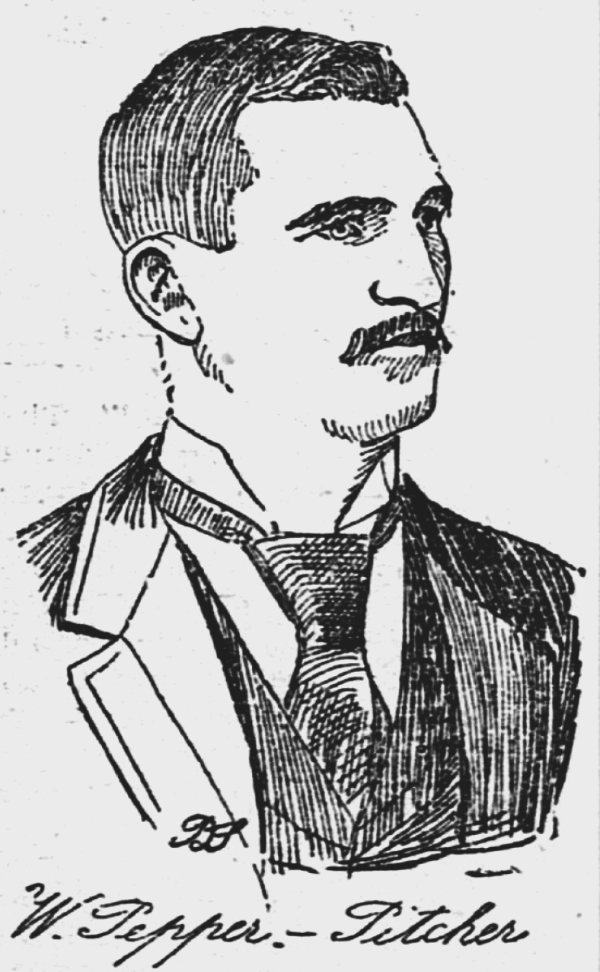
- Pitcher
- Born: September 1866; Kentucky, U.S.
- Died: November 5, 1903 (aged 37); Webb City, Missouri, U.S.
- Batted: Left Threw: Unknown

MLB debut
- June 30, 1894, for the Louisville Colonels

Last MLB appearance
- July 6, 1894, for the Louisville Colonels

MLB statistics
- Win–loss record: 0–1
- Earned run average: 6.75
- Strikeouts: 0
- Stats at Baseball Reference

Teams
- Louisville Colonels (1894)

William Harrison Peppers (September 1866 – November 5, 1903) was an American pitcher in Major League Baseball. He played for the Louisville Colonels in 1894.
