= Marvin Hawley =

American baseball player (1875–1904)

- Pitcher
- Born: June 1875; Painesville, Ohio, U.S.
- Died: April 28, 1904 (aged 28); Alliance, Ohio, U.S.
- Batted: Unknown Threw: Unknown

MLB debut
- September 22, 1894, for the Boston Beaneaters

Last MLB appearance
- September 22, 1894, for the Boston Beaneaters

MLB statistics
- Win–loss record: 0–1
- Earned run average: 7.71
- Strikeouts: 1
- Stats at Baseball Reference

Teams
- Boston Beaneaters (1894)

Marvin Hiram Hawley (June 1875 – April 28, 1904) was an American pitcher in Major League Baseball. He played for the Boston Beaneaters of the National League in one game on September 22, 1894.
