= Frank West (baseball) =

American baseball player (1874–1932)

- Pitcher
- Born: January 18, 1874; Johnstown, Pennsylvania, U.S.
- Died: September 6, 1932 (aged 59); Wilmerding, Pennsylvania, U.S.
- Batted: Unknown Threw: Right

MLB debut
- July 11, 1894, for the Boston Beaneaters

Last MLB appearance
- July 11, 1894, for the Boston Beaneaters

MLB statistics
- Win–loss record: 0-0
- Strikeouts: 1
- Earned run average: 9.00
- Stats at Baseball Reference

Teams
- Boston Beaneaters (1894)

John Franklin West (January 18, 1874 – September 6, 1932) was an American Major League Baseball pitcher who pitched in one game for the Boston Beaneaters in 1894. He threw three innings of relief, giving up three runs on five hits and two walks, striking out one batter.

== Sources ==
- Career statistics from Baseball Reference · Baseball Reference (Minors) · Retrosheet · Baseball Almanac
