= Fred Zahner =

American baseball player (1870–1900)

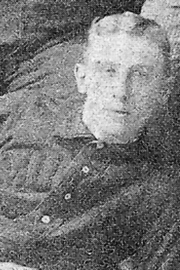
- Catcher
- Born: June 5, 1870; Louisville, Kentucky, U.S.
- Died: July 24, 1900 (aged 30); Louisville, Kentucky, U.S.
- Batted: Unknown Threw: Unknown

MLB debut
- July 23, 1894, for the Louisville Colonels

Last MLB appearance
- August 5, 1895, for the Louisville Colonels

MLB statistics
- Batting average: .213
- Home runs: 0
- RBI: 9
- Stats at Baseball Reference

Teams
- Louisville Colonels (1894–1895)

Frederick Joseph Zahner (June 5, 1870 - July 24, 1900) was an American professional baseball catcher. He played two seasons in Major League Baseball with the Louisville Colonels in 1894 and 1895. He died at the age of 30 when he fell out of a boat and drowned in Louisville, Kentucky.
