= Jake Boyd =

American baseball player (1874–1932)

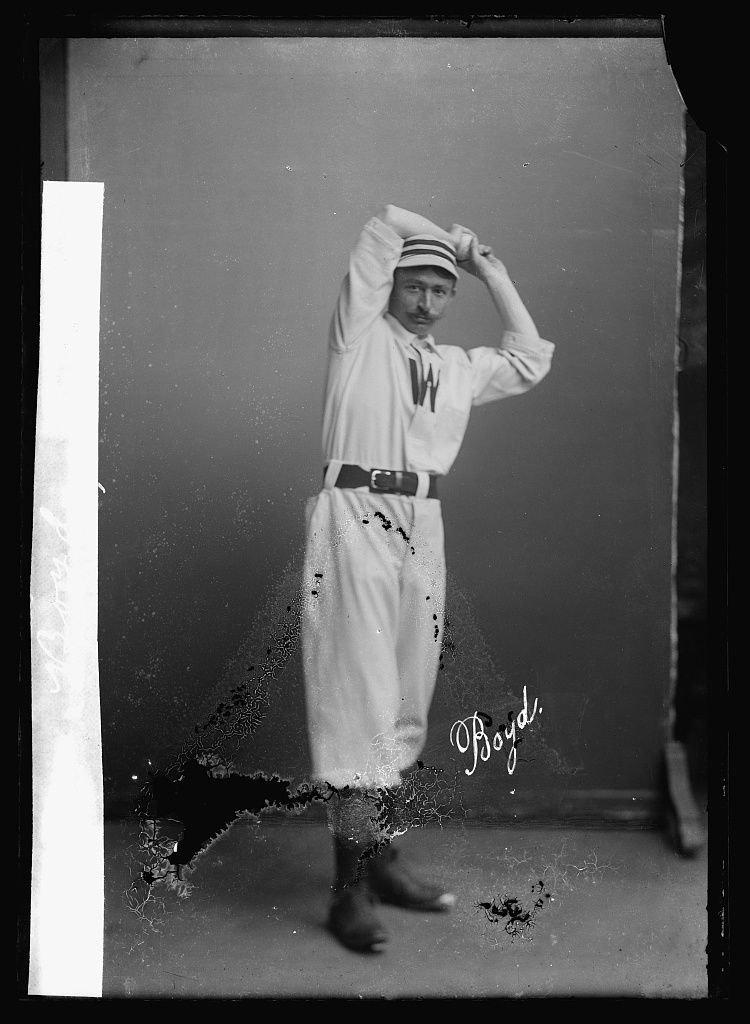
- Baseball pitcher Jake Boyd photographed by C. M. Bell Studio
- Outfielder / Pitcher / Infielder
- Born: January 19, 1874; Martinsburg, West Virginia, U.S.
- Died: August 12, 1932 (aged 58); Gettysburg, Pennsylvania, U.S.
- Batted: Unknown Threw: Left

MLB debut
- September 20, 1894, for the Washington Senators

Last MLB appearance
- May 8, 1896, for the Washington Senators

MLB statistics
- Batting average: .244
- Home runs: 1
- Runs batted in: 18
- Win–loss record: 3-16
- Earned run average: 7.02
- Strikeouts: 27
- Stats at Baseball Reference

Teams
- Washington Senators (1894–1896)

Jacob Henry Boyd (January 19, 1874 – August 12, 1932) was an American Major League Baseball player for the Washington Senators.
