= Al Lukens =

American baseball player

- Pitcher
- Born: November 15, 1868; Wheeling, West Virginia, U.S.
- Died: Unknown
- Batted: Unknown Threw: Right

MLB debut
- June 23, 1894, for the Philadelphia Phillies

Last MLB appearance
- July 4, 1894, for the Philadelphia Phillies

MLB statistics
- Win–loss record: 0–1
- Earned run average: 10.20
- Strikeouts: 0
- Stats at Baseball Reference

Teams
- Philadelphia Phillies (1894)

Albert P. Lukens was an American pitcher in Major League Baseball. He played for the Philadelphia Phillies of the National League in 1894.
