= Fred Blank =

American baseball player (1874–1936)

- Pitcher
- Born: June 18, 1874; De Soto, Missouri
- Died: February 5, 1936 (aged 61); St. Louis, Missouri
- Batted: Left Threw: Left

MLB debut
- June 20, 1894, for the Cincinnati Reds

Last MLB appearance
- June 20, 1894, for the Cincinnati Reds

MLB statistics
- Win–loss record: 0–1
- Earned run average: 4.50
- Strikeouts: 1
- Stats at Baseball Reference

Teams
- Cincinnati Reds (1894)

Frederick August Blank (June 18, 1874 – February 5, 1936) was a professional baseball player. He was a pitcher for the Cincinnati Reds of the National League in 1894. He appeared in one game for the Reds on June 20, 1894.
