= Ernie Mason =

American baseball player (1870–1904)

- Pitcher
- Born: 1870; New Orleans, Louisiana, U.S.
- Died: 1904 (aged 33–34); Covington, Louisiana, U.S.
- Batted: Unknown Threw: Unknown

MLB debut
- July 17, 1894, for the St. Louis Browns

Last MLB appearance
- August 1, 1894, for the St. Louis Browns

MLB statistics
- Win–loss record: 0-3
- Earned run average: 7.15
- Strikeouts: 3
- Stats at Baseball Reference

Teams
- St. Louis Browns (1894)

Ernest Joseph Mason (1870–1904) was an American professional baseball player who played pitcher in the Major Leagues for the St. Louis Browns in 1894.
