= Huyler Westervelt =

American baseball player (1869–1949)

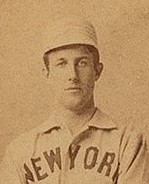
- Westervelt in 1894
- Pitcher
- Born: October 1, 1869; Tenafly, New Jersey
- Died: October 14, 1949 (aged 80); Pelham Manor, New York
- Batted: Unknown Threw: Right

MLB debut
- April 21, 1894, for the New York Giants

Last MLB appearance
- August 11, 1894, for the New York Giants

MLB statistics
- Win–loss record: 7–10
- Earned run average: 5.04
- Strikeouts: 35
- Stats at Baseball Reference

Teams
- New York Giants (1894)

Huyler Westervelt (October 1, 1869 – October 14, 1949) was an American pitcher in Major League Baseball (MLB). He played for the New York Giants in 1894.

Westervelt made his MLB debut on April 21, 1894, at the age of 24. He pitched in 23 games for the Giants that year, starting 18 of them and posting a record of 7–10 with a 5.04 earned run average. In 141 innings, he allowed 170 hits, 118 runs, and 79 earned runs while walking 76 batters and striking out 35. He also had 11 complete games, and his single shutout tied him for seventh most in the National League that season. At the plate, he hit .143 in 56 at-bats. He played his final MLB game on August 11, 1894.

Huyler was his mother's maiden name.

== External Sources ==
- Huyler Westervelt at SABR Bio Project
