= George Nicol (baseball) =

American baseball player (1870–1924)

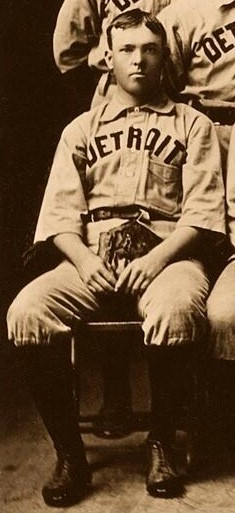
- Nicol in 1900
- Pitcher / Outfielder
- Born: October 17, 1870; Barry, Illinois, U.S.
- Died: August 4, 1924 (aged 53); Milwaukee, Wisconsin, U.S.
- Batted: Right Threw: Left

MLB debut
- September 23, 1890, for the St. Louis Browns

Last MLB appearance
- September 29, 1894, for the Louisville Colonels

MLB statistics
- Win–loss record: 5–7
- Earned run average: 7.19
- Strikeouts: 45
- Batting average: .347
- Stats at Baseball Reference

Teams
- St. Louis Browns (1890); Chicago Colts (1891); Pittsburgh Pirates (1894); Louisville Colonels (1894)

George Edward Nicol (October 17, 1870 – August 4, 1924) was an American baseball pitcher and outfielder who played three seasons in Major League Baseball (MLB). He played for the St. Louis Browns, Chicago Colts, Pittsburgh Pirates, and Louisville Colonels from 1890 to 1894. Possessing the rare combination of batting right-handed and throwing left-handed, he served primarily as a right fielder when he did not pitch.

Signed by the Browns without having previously played any minor league baseball, Nicol made his debut on September 23, 1890, and pitched—what was then considered to be—a no-hitter. The following season, he joined the Chicago Colts in July after starting in the minor leagues. After a two-year sojourn away from the major leagues, he signed with the Pittsburgh Pirates in 1894. In August of the same season, he was traded to the Louisville Colonels, with whom he played his final major league game on September 29, 1894.

== Personal life ==
Nicol was born on October 17, 1870, in Barry, Illinois. His father, Matthew Nicol, immigrated to the United States from Scotland in 1852, while his mother, Eliza, was born in America. As a youngster, he played baseball for a semi-professional club in nearby Mount Sterling. There, he rose to fame as a left-handed pitcher—probably due to rarity and valuableness of southpaws—and eventually got the opportunity to play in the major leagues before he turned 20.

After his professional baseball career ended, Nicol moved to Milwaukee, Wisconsin. In 1896, he married his wife Lilian. Together, they had one son, George Jr., who was born in 1908. In order to support his new family, he became a machinist. During this time, he continued to play baseball—albeit amateur baseball—with the Milwaukee City League.

On the night of August 3, 1924, Nicol died in his sleep at the age of 53. His death was treated as suspicious, as a post-mortem examination found him to have four broken ribs that led to his death. He was interred at the Union Cemetery in Milwaukee.

== Professional baseball career ==
=== St. Louis Browns (1890) ===
Nicol was signed by the St. Louis Browns near the end of the 1890 season, even though he had no prior experience in minor league baseball. The team were in desperate need for players; their situation was a microcosm of the American Association (AA) that already had few players with major league experience to begin with. The league's precarious situation was not helped by the fact that they had to compete with both the well-established National League (NL) and the newly formed yet highly popular Players' League. Although the latter league lasted just one season, they were able to outdraw both the AA and NL in terms of attendance. This put a dent in the fortunes of the American Association, whose teams consequently struggled to pay the players' salaries and thus had to utilize amateur, semi-professional, or minor league players.

Nicol made his major league debut for the Browns on September 23, 1890, starting the game against the Philadelphia Athletics that resulted in a 21–2 win. He did not allow a single hit to the Athletics through seven innings, after which the game was called off due to darkness. Although the game was previously considered a no-hitter, a rule change made by the MLB's Committee on Statistical Accuracy in 1991 redefined the definition of a no-hitter; a no-hit game now had to span a minimum of nine innings. As a result, Nicol's debut was one of fifty no-hitters deleted from the official record books.

Three days after his debut, Nicol faced the Athletics again in his second major league start. He followed up his dazzling debut with another solid performance, giving up just one hit—a single—in a 7–3 win that ended after five innings. His subsequent starts were disappointing, most notably a 10–3 loss against the Toledo Maumees, where his inability to hold baserunners was first exposed. He finished the season with a win–loss record of 2–1, a 4.76 earned run average (ERA), and had 16 strikeouts but walked 19 in three games started. After his contract expired at the end of the season, no major league team signed Nicol, so he began the 1891 season with the Davenport Pilgrims, a minor league baseball team that competed in the Illinois–Iowa League.

=== Chicago Colts (1891) ===
Nicol's tenure with the Pilgrims was successful, albeit brief. He compiled a 15–8 record with a 1.36 ERA in 23 games started and threw five shutouts. He soon demonstrated himself as the best pitcher in the league by holding opposing teams to three hits or less in four separate games. His pitching performances caught the eye of Chicago Colts manager Cap Anson, who offered him a $225 a month contract. Nicol originally agreed to the deal, but subsequently wanted to renege, citing "a change of heart." However, he was eventually forced to accept the offer when the Colts threatened to blacklist him. The Pilgrims, who were already struggling financially, received just $300 from the Colts for their ace and folded soon after he left the team.

Nicol arrived in Chicago on July 20 and was penciled in to start on consecutive days against Charles Radbourn and Cy Young. Though he performed poorly in both games, the Colts still managed to win. He was shelled in the third inning by the Cincinnati Reds, and on the next day, he gave up seven runs to the Cleveland Spiders in only two innings. Because of these starts, he did not appear in another game until August 14, when he was used in relief to face the Brooklyn Dodgers. His control issues flared up, and he had trouble holding the Dodgers' baserunners. He was released one week later, having walked 10 batters in the 11 innings he pitched for the Colts. He ended the season playing for Marinette of the Wisconsin State League.

=== Minor league sojourn ===
After 1891, Nicol went back to the Illinois–Iowa League and joined the Rockford Hustlers. He pitched well throughout the 1892 season—though his record was 16–16, he had a 1.47 ERA, 230 strikeouts in 288 innings pitched, and pitched five shutouts. He limited his opponents to two hits in five different complete games and threw a one-hitter. The league, however, was struggling financially, and after the end of the league's postseason, his request for release was granted.

At the start of 1893, Nicol signed with the Los Angeles Angels of the California League. A new rule was introduced stipulating that the pitcher's mound be 60 feet 6 inches (18.44 m) away from home plate. This increase of five feet in distance gave batters a greater advantage. Despite this, Nicol was noted for his ability to adapt to the new rule better than other pitchers in the league. This was evident as he was able to garner a 15–8 record and 0.86 ERA in 188 1/3 innings pitched. His control suffered, however, as he struck out just 64 batters and walked 125, thus contributing to his 1.66 WHIP that season. In early June, there was speculation that players would have their salaries cut in order to sustain the league, which was allegedly on the verge of collapsing. Several weeks after two of his teammates departed, Nicol himself left the team, joining the two in the Eastern League with the Erie Blackbirds. He continued his stellar pitching performances with a 13–9 record and a 1.80 ERA in 200 innings, while reducing the number of walks issued to 89.

=== Pittsburgh Pirates and Louisville Colonels (1894) ===
Nicol signed for the Pittsburgh Pirates at the start of the 1894 season. His stint with the team was dismal, as he posted a 3–4 record with a 6.22 ERA, while his control and strikeout ability continued to diminish, evident with his 39 walks issued against a mere 13 strikeouts in 9 games pitched. On August 13, he was traded to the Louisville Colonels in exchange for Jock Menefee and $1000.

In his first game for the Colonels, Nicol was battered by the opposing team, giving up 19 hits and 15 earned runs in a complete game. He made just one more start for the team and finished with a 13.76 ERA over 17 innings pitched. Because of his pitching struggles, he changed positions and played 26 games in the outfield during his time with the organization, making 43 putouts, 2 assists, and committed 9 errors, resulting in a .791 fielding percentage. His overall statistics for the year were mixed. His pitching record was 3–5 with an 8.24 ERA, 17 strikeouts, and 55 walks issued over 63 1/3 innings pitched. However, his offensive numbers were impressive, as he posted a batting average of .351 and amassed 47 hits, 7 doubles, 4 triples, 22 runs batted in, and a .463 slugging percentage in 141 plate appearances, while striking out just 5 times. At the conclusion of the season, he was released by the Colonels.

=== Back to the minors ===
Nicol returned to minor league baseball, joining the Indianapolis Hoosiers of the Western League. After spending just one month with the team, he moved within the league to the Milwaukee Brewers, where he played for five seasons and was utilized exclusively as an outfielder from 1896 onwards. In 1896, he was at the center of controversy when the Philadelphia Phillies drafted him and promised the Brewers that they would return him should they not be in need of his services. However, he was instantly outrighted to the Detroit Tigers, with the Phillies' president acknowledging that they were assisting and collaborating with the Tigers, who had requested the transaction. The case went to an arbitral tribunal, which ruled in favor of the Brewers.

In 1900, Nicol joined the Wilkes-Barre Coal Barons of the Atlantic League. The league disbanded in June of that year, whereupon he joined the Detroit Tigers, who were now part of the American League. He was released at the end of the season, having batted .258 in 73 games. He returned to the now-expanded Illinois–Indiana–Iowa League in 1904 and played there for two seasons. His career after 1906 is unclear, although the Society for American Baseball Research writes that he signed with a Wisconsin State League team based in Freeport, Illinois, and played for them for the remainder of the year before retiring from professional baseball.
