= Tom Murray (baseball) =

American baseball player (1867–1939)

- Shortstop
- Born: March 23, 1867; Paterson, New Jersey, U.S.
- Died: June 26, 1939 (aged 72); Columbus, Ohio, U.S.
- Batted: Right Threw: Unknown

MLB debut
- June 20, 1894, for the Philadelphia Phillies

Last MLB appearance
- June 20, 1894, for the Philadelphia Phillies

MLB statistics
- Games played: 1
- At bats: 2
- Hits: 0
- Stats at Baseball Reference

Teams
- Philadelphia Phillies (1894)

Thomas Aloysius Murray (March 23, 1867 – June 26, 1939) was an American Major League Baseball player. Murray played in one game in the 1894 season with the Philadelphia Phillies.
