= Joe Peitz =

American baseball player (1869–1919)

- Outfielder
- Born: November 8, 1869; St. Louis, Missouri, U.S.
- Died: December 4, 1919 (aged 50); St. Louis, Missouri, U.S.
- Batted: Unknown Threw: Unknown

MLB debut
- June 28, 1894, for the St. Louis Browns

Last MLB appearance
- July 11, 1894, for the St. Louis Browns

MLB statistics
- Games played: 7
- At bats: 26
- Hits: 11
- Stats at Baseball Reference

Teams
- St. Louis Browns (1894)

Joseph Peitz (November 8, 1869 – December 4, 1919) was an American outfielder in Major League Baseball of German descent. He played for the St. Louis Browns in 1894.

His brother, Heinie Peitz, was his teammate on the Browns.
