= Thomas Maguire (baseball) =

American baseball player

- Pitcher
- Batted: Unknown Threw: Left

MLB debut
- June 16, 1894, for the Cincinnati Reds

Last MLB appearance
- June 16, 1894, for the Cincinnati Reds

MLB statistics
- Win–loss record: 0–1
- Earned run average: 10.50
- Strikeouts: 1
- WHIP: 3.333
- Stats at Baseball Reference

Teams
- Cincinnati Reds (1894)

Thomas Maguire was an American pitcher in the National League for the 1894 Cincinnati Reds. For years he was known as just McGuire before confirmation of his identity was found in 2014.
