= Bill Whitrock =

American baseball player (1870–1935)

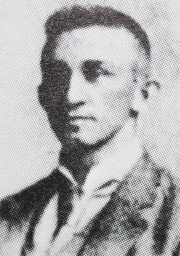
- Pitcher
- Born: March 4, 1870; Cincinnati, Ohio, U.S.
- Died: July 26, 1935 (aged 65); Derby, Connecticut, U.S.
- Threw: Right

MLB debut
- May 3, 1890, for the St. Louis Browns

Last MLB appearance
- July 11, 1896, for the Philadelphia Phillies

MLB statistics
- Win–loss record: 9-19
- Earned run average: 5.44
- Strikeouts: 57
- Stats at Baseball Reference

Teams
- St. Louis Browns (1890); Louisville Colonels (1893–1894); Cincinnati Reds (1894); Philadelphia Phillies (1896)

William Franklin Whitrock (March 4, 1870 – July 26, 1935) was an American Major League Baseball pitcher who played from 1890 to 1896 with four teams. He had a career record of 9–19.

He was born in Cincinnati and died in Derby, Connecticut.
