= George Paynter (baseball) =

American baseball player (1871–1950)

- Outfielder
- Born: July 6, 1871; Cincinnati
- Died: September 28, 1950 (aged 79); Cincinnati
- Batted: Right Threw: Right

MLB debut
- August 12, 1894, for the St. Louis Browns

Last MLB appearance
- August 12, 1894, for the St. Louis Browns

MLB statistics
- Games played: 1
- At bats: 4
- Hits: 0
- Stats at Baseball Reference

Teams
- St. Louis Browns (1894)

George Washington Paynter (July 6, 1871 – September 28, 1950) was an outfielder in Major League Baseball. He played for the St. Louis Browns in 1894.
