= Bill Pfann =

American baseball player (1863–1904)

- Pitcher
- Born: June 1863; Hamilton, Canada West
- Died: June 3, 1904 (aged 40–41); Hamilton, Ontario, Canada
- Batted: Unknown Threw: Right

MLB debut
- June 16, 1894, for the Cincinnati Reds

Last MLB appearance
- June 16, 1894, for the Cincinnati Reds

MLB statistics
- Win–loss record: 0–1
- Earned run average: 27.00
- Strikeouts: 0
- Stats at Baseball Reference

Teams
- Cincinnati Reds (1894)

William F. Pfann (June 1863 – June 3, 1904) was a professional baseball player. He was a pitcher for the Cincinnati Reds of the National League in 1894. He appeared in one game for the Reds on June 16, 1894.
