= 1894 Major League Baseball season =

1894 MLB season
- League: National League (NL)
- Sport: Baseball
- Duration: Regular season: April 19 – September 30, 1894; Temple Cup: October 4–8, 1894
- Games: 132
- Teams: 12

Pennant winner
- NL champions: Baltimore Orioles
- NL runners-up: New York Giants

Temple Cup
- Venue: Polo Grounds, New York, New York; Union Park, Baltimore, Maryland
- Champions: New York Giants
- Runners-up: Baltimore Orioles

MLB seasons
- ← 1893 1895 →

Locations of teams for the 1893–1895 National League seasons
National League

The 1894 major league baseball season began on April 19, 1894. The regular season ended on September 30, with the Baltimore Orioles as the pennant winner of the National League and the New York Giants as runner-up. The postseason began with Game 1 of the first Temple Cup on October 4 and ended with Game 4 on October 8. The Giants swept the Orioles, capturing their first Temple Cup.

The 1894 season saw the return of a postseason championship series, the Temple Cup, following the end of the World's Championship Series with the demise of the American Association in 1891 and the one-off, split-season 1892 World's Championship Series.

== Schedule ==
The 1894 schedule consisted of 132 games for the twelve teams of the National League. Each team was scheduled to play 12 games against the other eleven teams in the league. This continued the format put in place in the previous season and would be used until 1898.

Opening Day took place on April 19 featuring eight teams. The final day of the season was on September 30, also featuring eight teams. The Temple Cup took place between October 4 and October 8.

== Rule changes ==
The 1894 season saw the following rule changes:

- Foul bunts are now classified as strikes.
- The sacrifice hit rule, which is when a batter deliberately gets out in an effort to advance a baserunner to another base, is implemented.
  - Sacrifice hits, which exempt a batter from a time at bat (including sacrifice bunts), is implemented.
- A precursor to the Infield fly rule is implemented, stating "the batsman is out if he hits a fly ball that can be handled by an infielder while first base is occupied, with only one out."

== Teams ==
An asterisk (*) denotes the ballpark a team played the minority of their home games at. Ballparks listed in chronological order.

League	Team	City	Ballpark	Capacity	Manager
National League	Baltimore Orioles	Baltimore, Maryland	Union Park	6,500	Ned Hanlon
National League	Boston Beaneaters	Boston, Massachusetts	South End Grounds (II)*	8,500*	Frank Selee
National League	Boston Beaneaters	Boston, Massachusetts	Congress Street Grounds*	14,000*	Frank Selee
National League	Boston Beaneaters	Boston, Massachusetts	South End Grounds (III)	5,000	Frank Selee
National League	Brooklyn Grooms	Brooklyn, New York	Eastern Park	12,000	Dave Foutz
National League	Chicago Colts	Chicago, Illinois	West Side Park	13,000	Cap Anson
National League	Cincinnati Reds	Cincinnati, Ohio	League Park (Cincinnati)	9,000	Charles Comiskey
National League	Cleveland Spiders	Cleveland, Ohio	League Park (Cleveland)	9,000	Patsy Tebeau
National League	Louisville Colonels	Louisville, Kentucky	Eclipse Park	6,400	Billy Barnie
National League	New York Giants	New York, New York	Polo Grounds	16,000	John Montgomery Ward
National League	Philadelphia Phillies	Philadelphia, Pennsylvania	Philadelphia Base Ball Grounds	12,500	Arthur Irwin
National League	Philadelphia Phillies	Philadelphia, Pennsylvania	University of Pennsylvania Athletic Field*	Unknown	Arthur Irwin
National League	Philadelphia Phillies	Philadelphia, Pennsylvania	Philadelphia Base Ball Grounds*	Unknown*	Arthur Irwin
National League	Pittsburgh Pirates	Allegheny, Pennsylvania	Exposition Park	6,500	Al Buckenberger
National League	Pittsburgh Pirates	Allegheny, Pennsylvania	Exposition Park	6,500	Connie Mack
National League	St. Louis Browns	St. Louis, Missouri	New Sportsman's Park	14,500	George Miller
National League	Washington Senators	Washington, D.C.	Boundary Field	6,500	Gus Schmelz

1. Initial stadium of the season burned in a fire (Boston: May 16, Philadelphia: August 6)
2. Temporary stadium.
3. In today's New York, New York.
4. Makeshift stands built for remainder of the season, from August 18.
5. In today's Pittsburgh, Pennsylvania.

== Standings ==
=== National League ===
National League
Team	W	L	Pct.	GB	Home	Road
Baltimore Orioles	89	39	.695	—	52‍–‍15	37‍–‍24
New York Giants	88	44	.667	3	49‍–‍17	39‍–‍27
Boston Beaneaters	83	49	.629	8	44‍–‍19	39‍–‍30
Philadelphia Phillies	71	57	.555	18	48‍–‍20	23‍–‍37
Brooklyn Grooms	70	61	.534	20½	42‍–‍24	28‍–‍37
Cleveland Spiders	68	61	.527	21½	35‍–‍24	33‍–‍37
Pittsburgh Pirates	65	65	.500	25	46‍–‍28	19‍–‍37
Chicago Colts	57	75	.432	34	35‍–‍30	22‍–‍45
St. Louis Browns	56	76	.424	35	34‍–‍32	22‍–‍44
Cincinnati Reds	55	75	.423	35	37‍–‍28	18‍–‍47
Washington Senators	45	87	.341	46	32‍–‍30	13‍–‍57
Louisville Colonels	36	94	.277	54	24‍–‍38	12‍–‍56

=== Tie games ===
16 tie games, which are not factored into winning percentage or games behind (and were often replayed again), occurred throughout the season.

- Baltimore Orioles, 1
- Boston Beaneaters, 1
- Brooklyn Grooms, 4
- Chicago Colts, 5
- Cincinnati Reds, 4
- Cleveland Spiders, 1
- Louisville Colonels, 1
- New York Giants, 7
- Philadelphia Phillies, 4
- Pittsburgh Pirates, 3
- St. Louis Browns, 1

== Postseason ==
=== Bracket ===
Temple Cup
NL1	Baltimore Orioles	1	6	1	1
NL2	New York Giants	4	9	4	7

== Managerial changes ==
=== Off-season ===
Team	Former Manager	New Manager
Philadelphia Phillies	Harry Wright	Arthur Irwin
St. Louis Browns	Bill Watkins	George Miller
Washington Senators	Jim O'Rourke	Gus Schmelz

=== In-season ===
Team	Former Manager	New Manager
Pittsburgh Pirates	Al Buckenberger	Connie Mack

== League leaders ==
Any team shown in small text indicates a previous team a player was on during the season.

=== National League ===
Hitting leaders
Stat	Player	Total
AVG	Hugh Duffy (BSN)	.440
OPS	Hugh Duffy (BSN)	1.196
HR	Hugh Duffy (BSN)	18
RBI	Sam Thompson (PHI)	149
R	Billy Hamilton^{1} (PHI)	198
H	Hugh Duffy (BSN)	237
SB	Billy Hamilton (PHI)	100

^{1} All-time single-season runs record

Pitching leaders
Stat	Player	Total
W	Amos Rusie^{1} (NYG)	36
L	Pink Hawley (PIT)	27
ERA	Amos Rusie^{1} (NYG)	2.78
K	Amos Rusie^{1} (NYG)	195
IP	Theodore Breitenstein (STL)	447.1
SV	Tony Mullane (CLE/BAL)	4
WHIP	Amos Rusie (NYG)	1.410

^{1} National League Triple Crown pitching winner

== Milestones ==
=== Batters ===
==== Four home runs in one game ====
- Bobby Lowe (BSN):
  - Became the first player to hit four home runs in one game in a 20–11 win against the Cincinnati Reds on May 30.

==== Cycles ====
- Lave Cross (PHI):
  - Cross hit for his first cycle and first in franchise history, on April 24 against the Brooklyn Grooms
- Bill Hassamaer (WAS):
  - Hassamaer hit for his first cycle and fifth in franchise history, on June 13 against the St. Louis Browns.
- Sam Thompson (PHI):
  - Thompson hit for his first cycle and second in franchise history, on August 17 against the Louisville Colonels.
- Tom Parrott (CIN):
  - Parrott hit for his first cycle and fifth in franchise history, on September 28 against the New York Giants.

==== Other batting accomplishments ====
- Tom Brown (LOU):
  - Recorded his 500th career stolen base, becoming the fourth player to reach this mark. It is unknown what day this stolen base occurred.
- Billy Hamilton (PHI):
  - Tied a record for most stolen bases in a single game, stealing seven bases in game 2 of a doubleheader on August 31 against the Washington Senators.
  - Recorded his 500th career stolen base, becoming the fifth player to reach this mark. It is unknown what day this stolen base occurred.

=== Pitchers ===
- Pink Hawley (STL):
  - Set a Major League record by becoming the first pitcher to hit three consecutive batters by pitch, in a game against the Washington Senators in game one of a doubleheader on July 4.

=== Miscellaneous ===
- Baltimore Orioles:
  - Set a major league record for most runs scored in the ninth innings, by scoring 14 runs against the Boston Beaneaters on April 24.
- Boston Beaneaters:
  - Set a major league record for most runs scored in the first inning, by scoring 16 runs against the Baltimore Orioles on June 18.

== Home field attendance ==
Team name	Wins	%±	Home attendance	%±	Per game
New York Giants	88	29.4%	387,000	33.4%	5,451
Philadelphia Phillies	71	−1.4%	352,773	20.4%	4,969
Baltimore Orioles	89	48.3%	328,000	129.4%	4,896
Chicago Colts	57	1.8%	239,000	6.9%	3,515
Brooklyn Grooms	70	7.7%	214,000	−8.9%	3,101
Pittsburgh Pirates	65	−19.8%	159,000	−13.6%	2,120
Cincinnati Reds	55	−15.4%	158,000	−18.7%	2,394
St. Louis Browns	56	−1.8%	155,000	−20.5%	2,348
Boston Beaneaters	83	−3.5%	152,800	−21.0%	2,425
Washington Senators	45	12.5%	125,000	38.9%	2,016
Cleveland Spiders	68	−6.8%	82,000	−36.9%	1,390
Louisville Colonels	36	−28.0%	75,000	39.7%	1,210

== Venues ==
There were two instances of conflagration causing the temporary relocation of teams before returning to a rebuilt ballpark:

- In what was only the fifth home game of the Boston Beaneaters' season, their home of the South End Grounds burned down during the third inning of a game against the Baltimore Orioles on May 15, forcing the team to play at the Congress Street Grounds, the former home of the Players' League/American Association Boston Reds from May 16 until the South End Grounds could be rebuilt. The team would play 27 home games at the Congress Street Grounds through June 20, before going on a month-long road trip and returning to a rebuilt South End Grounds on July 20, where they would go on to play another 31 home games for the rest of the season.
- During a practice session on August 6, the home of the Philadelphia Phillies, the Philadelphia Base Ball Grounds burned down. The Phillies would play six games from August 11 through August 17 at University of Pennsylvania Athletic Field before returning to the Philadelphia Base Ball Grounds the following day, where temporary bleachers had been installed.

Prior to the start of the season, the Cincinnati Reds' home as League Park saw major changes. A new grandstand in what was left field was built, as well as an ampitheater. The baseball diamond was shifted from the southeast corner of the lot to the southwest corner, with the original seating retained as right field seating.

== See also ==
- 1894 in baseball (Events, Births, Deaths)
