= 1896 Temple Cup =

Pre-modern baseball championship

| Team (Wins) | Manager(s) | Season |
|---|---|---|
| Baltimore Orioles (4) | Ned Hanlon | 90–39 (.698), GA: 9½ |
| Cleveland Spiders (0) | Patsy Tebeau | 80–48 (.625), GA: — |
- Dates: October 2–8
- Venue(s): Union Park (Baltimore); League Park (Cleveland)
- Umpires: Bob Emslie, Jack Sheridan
- Hall of Famers: Orioles: Ned Hanlon (manager); Hughie Jennings; Willie Keeler; Joe Kelley; John McGraw†; Wilbert Robinson†; Spiders: Jesse Burkett; Bobby Wallace; Cy Young † elected as a manager.

The 1896 Temple Cup was an end-of-the-year best-of-seven playoff between the National League champion Baltimore Orioles and runner-up Cleveland Spiders. The rematch of the previous year's Temple Cup began on October 2 and ended on October 8 with the Orioles sweeping in four games.

In this third iteration of the Temple Cup, the Baltimore Orioles, who were also in their third Temple Cup, became the only team in the four-season Temple Cup to both win the National League pennant and win the Cup. Each winning player received $200, equal to $7,740 in 2025 dollars.

== Summary ==
Baltimore won the series, 4–0.

| Game | Date | Score | Location |
|---|---|---|---|
| 1 | October 2 | Cleveland Spiders – 1, Baltimore Orioles – 7 | Union Park |
| 2 | October 3 | Baltimore Orioles – 7, Cleveland Spiders – 2 | Union Park |
| 3 | October 5 | Baltimore Orioles – 6, Cleveland Spiders – 2 | Union Park |
| 4 | October 8 | Cleveland Spiders – 0, Baltimore Orioles – 5 | League Park |

== Game summaries ==
=== Game 1 ===
Friday, October 2, 1896 at Union Park in Baltimore, Maryland
| Team | 1 | 2 | 3 | 4 | 5 | 6 | 7 | 8 | 9 | R | H | E |
|---|---|---|---|---|---|---|---|---|---|---|---|---|
| Cleveland | 0 | 0 | 0 | 0 | 0 | 1 | 0 | 0 | 0 | 1 | 5 | 4 |
| Baltimore | 0 | 0 | 2 | 0 | 0 | 1 | 3 | 1 | 0 | 7 | 13 | 1 |
Starting pitchers: CLE: Cy Young; BAL: Bill Hoffer; WP: Bill Hoffer (1–0) LP: Cy Young (0–1); Attendance: 3,995; Notes: Game duration 1:40; The game was initially scheduled for October 1.

=== Game 2 ===
Saturday, October 3, 1896 at Union Park in Baltimore, Maryland
| Team | 1 | 2 | 3 | 4 | 5 | 6 | 7 | 8 | 9 | R | H | E |
|---|---|---|---|---|---|---|---|---|---|---|---|---|
| Baltimore | 4 | 0 | 2 | 0 | 1 | 0 | 0 | 0 | X | 7 | 10 | 3 |
| Cleveland | 0 | 0 | 1 | 0 | 0 | 1 | 0 | 0 | X | 2 | 7 | 3 |
Starting pitchers: BAL: Joe Corbett; CLE: Bobby Wallace; WP: Joe Corbett (1–0) LP: Bobby Wallace (0–1); Attendance: 3,100; Notes: Game duration 2:00; Game called on account of darkness. Two runs scored by Baltimore in 9th inning not counted.

=== Game 3 ===
Monday, October 5, 1896 at Union Park in Baltimore, Maryland
| Team | 1 | 2 | 3 | 4 | 5 | 6 | 7 | 8 | 9 | R | H | E |
|---|---|---|---|---|---|---|---|---|---|---|---|---|
| Baltimore | 0 | 1 | 1 | 0 | 0 | 1 | 0 | 3 | 0 | 6 | 8 | 2 |
| Cleveland | 0 | 0 | 1 | 0 | 1 | 0 | 0 | 0 | 0 | 2 | 10 | 2 |
Starting pitchers: BAL: Bill Hoffer; CLE: George Cuppy; WP: Bill Hoffer (2–0) LP: George Cuppy (0–1)

=== Game 4 ===
Thursday, October 8, 1896 at League Park in Cleveland, Ohio
| Team | 1 | 2 | 3 | 4 | 5 | 6 | 7 | 8 | 9 | R | H | E |
|---|---|---|---|---|---|---|---|---|---|---|---|---|
| Cleveland | 0 | 0 | 0 | 0 | 0 | 0 | 0 | 0 | 0 | 0 | 4 | 1 |
| Baltimore | 0 | 0 | 0 | 0 | 0 | 0 | 2 | 3 | X | 5 | 11 | 1 |
Starting pitchers: CLE: George Cuppy; BAL: Joe Corbett; WP: Joe Corbett (2–0) LP: George Cuppy (0–2)

== See also ==
- 1896 in baseball
- List of pre-World Series baseball champions
