= 1897 Temple Cup =

Pre-modern baseball championship

Team (Wins)	Manager(s)	Season
Baltimore Orioles (4)	Ned Hanlon	93–39 (.705), GA: 2
Boston Beaneaters (1)	Frank Selee	90–40 (.692), GA: —
- Dates: October 4–11
- Venue(s): South End Grounds (Boston); Union Park (Baltimore)
- Umpires: Bob Emslie, Tim Hurst
- Hall of Famers: Orioles: Ned Hanlon (manager); Hughie Jennings; Willie Keeler; Joe Kelley; John McGraw†; Beaneaters: Frank Selee (manager); Jimmy Collins; Hugh Duffy; Billy Hamilton; Kid Nichols † elected as a manager.

The 1897 Temple Cup was an end-of-the-year best-of-seven playoff between the National League champion Baltimore Orioles and runner-up Boston Beaneaters. The series began on October 4 and ended on October 11 with the Orioles winning in five games.

Due to lack of enthusiasm from both players and fans, and the perception that the Temple Cup was more of a showcase than a championship, the 1897 Temple Cup would be the final version of the championship series. Aside from the 1900 Chronicle-Telegraph Cup, this would be the last championship series until the birth of the modern World Series in 1903.

== Summary ==
Baltimore won the series, 4–1.

Game	Date	Score	Location
1	October 4	Baltimore Orioles – 12, Boston Beaneaters – 13	South End Grounds
2	October 5	Baltimore Orioles – 13, Boston Beaneaters – 11	South End Grounds
3	October 6	Baltimore Orioles – 8, Boston Beaneaters – 3 (7)	South End Grounds
4	October 10	Boston Beaneaters – 11, Baltimore Orioles – 12	Union Park
5	October 11	Boston Beaneaters – 3, Baltimore Orioles – 9	Union Park

== Game summaries ==
=== Game 1 ===
Monday, October 4, 1897 at South End Grounds in Boston, Massachusetts
Team	1	2	3	4	5	6	7	8	9	R	H	E
Baltimore	4	0	1	0	2	3	2	0	0	12	20	4
Boston	3	0	0	1	2	5	0	2	X	13	12	4
Starting pitchers: BAL: Jerry Nops; BOS: Ted Lewis; WP: Ted Lewis (1–0) LP: Jerry Nops (0–1); Attendance: 10,000

=== Game 2 ===
Tuesday, October 5, 1897 at South End Grounds in Boston, Massachusetts
Team	1	2	3	4	5	6	7	8	9	R	H	E
Baltimore	1	3	0	1	6	0	1	1	0	13	17	2
Boston	0	0	2	6	2	0	1	0	0	11	16	3
Starting pitchers: BAL: Joe Corbett; BOS: Fred Klobedanz; WP: Joe Corbett (1–0) LP: Fred Klobedanz (0–1); Home runs: BAL: Henry Reitz (1), William Clarke (1), Joe Corbett (1); BOS: Herman Long (1); Attendance: 6,000

=== Game 3 ===
Wednesday, October 6, 1897 at South End Grounds in Boston, Massachusetts
Team	1	2	3	4	5	6	7	8	9	R	H	E
Baltimore	0	4	4	0	0	0	0	X	X	8	9	2
Boston	0	0	3	0	0	0	0	X	X	3	10	2
Starting pitchers: BAL: Bill Hoffer; BOS: Ted Lewis; WP: Bill Hoffer (1–0) LP: Ted Lewis (0–1); Attendance: 2,000; Notes: Game called due to rain. Four runs scored by Baltimore in the top of the 8th not counted.

=== Game 4 ===
Sunday, October 10, 1897 at Union Park in Baltimore, Maryland
Team	1	2	3	4	5	6	7	8	9	R	H	E
Boston	0	0	0	0	2	4	3	2	0	11	16	3
Baltimore	6	5	0	0	0	1	0	0	X	12	14	2
Starting pitchers: BOS: Jack Stivetts; BAL: Jerry Nops; WP: Jerry Nops (1–1) LP: Jack Stivetts (0–1); Attendance: 2,000; Notes: Game duration 2:50

=== Game 5 ===
Monday, October 11, 1897 at Union Park in Baltimore, Maryland
Team	1	2	3	4	5	6	7	8	9	R	H	E
Boston	0	2	0	0	0	0	0	0	1	3	15	3
Baltimore	0	2	3	0	0	0	2	2	X	9	13	2
Starting pitchers: BOS: Charlie Hickman; BAL: Bill Hoffer; WP: Bill Hoffer (2–0) LP: Charlie Hickman (0–1); Attendance: 700

== See also ==
- 1897 in baseball
- List of pre-World Series baseball champions
