= Arlie Pond =

American baseball player and doctor (1873–1930)

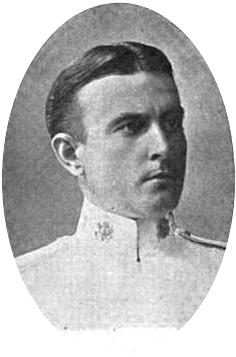
- Pitcher
- Born: January 19, 1873; Saugus, Massachusetts, U.S.
- Died: September 19, 1930 (aged 57); Cebu, Philippines
- Batted: Right Threw: Right

MLB debut
- July 4, 1895, for the Baltimore Orioles

Last MLB appearance
- July 6, 1898, for the Baltimore Orioles

MLB statistics
- Win–loss record: 35–19
- Earned run average: 3.45
- Strikeouts: 156
- Stats at Baseball Reference

Teams
- Baltimore Orioles (1895–1898)

Dr. Erasmus Arlington "Arlie" Pond (January 19, 1873 – September 19, 1930) was an American Major League Baseball pitcher for the Baltimore Orioles from 1895 to 1898, as well as a doctor in the United States Army during the Spanish–American War and World War I.

== Early life ==
Pond was born on January 19, 1873, in East Saugus, Massachusetts, to Abbott Sequard Pond and Ellen (Stocker) Pond. He was named after his uncle, Dr. Erasmus Arlington Pond. By the time he was in grammar school his family had moved to Rutland, Vermont, where his father sold surgical equipment for the Pond Sphygmograph Company.

== College ==
On September 13, 1888, Pond entered Norwich University. He pitched for and captained the school's baseball team. He was also a musician in the Corps of Cadets. In 1890 he transferred to the University of Vermont. There, Pond, in addition to playing baseball, was a member of the glee and banjo clubs. During his senior year, he also played varsity football. During his first year on the Vermont baseball team, Pond played center field. The team finished the season with a record of 19-6, which was the best in the school's history. The following year Pond alternated at pitcher with Bert Abbey. In a game against Yale, Pond pitched a no-hitter. In 1893 Vermont was invited by Amos Alonzo Stagg to play in an eight-team double-elimination college baseball tournament at the Chicago World's Fair. Although Vermont did not win the tournament, the small school was the only team to defeat the eventual champion, Yale. Pond graduated from the University of Vermont in 1893, but enrolled in the school's College of Medicine, which allowed him to remain on the baseball team for one more season.

== Baseball career ==
After he graduated from the University of Vermont College of Medicine in 1895, Pond enrolled in a post-graduate surgical course at the College of Physicians and Surgeons in Baltimore. Baltimore Orioles manager Ned Hanlon convinced Pond to spend his summers with the team. He signed his first major league contract on June 23, 1895, and made his major league debut on July 4, 1895. Although he pitched only in six games that season, the 23-year-old rookie found other ways to make himself useful, including serving as team doctor. After one game, The Baltimore Sun reported "Dr. Pond is suffering from a small abscess in his left hand, which he lanced himself."

In 1896, Pond started 26 games, in which he compiled a 16-8 with a 3.49 ERA. The Orioles finished the season with the best record in the National League and swept the Cleveland Spiders to win the Temple Cup (Pond did not pitch in the series).

In 1897, Hanlon became the first manager to use a four-man starting rotation, which consisted of Pond, Bill Hoffer, Joe Corbett, and Jerry Nops. Pond started 28 games and finished with a career-best record of 18-9 and a 3.52 ERA.

During the 1898 season, Pond pitched sparingly. Poor attendance in Baltimore meant that team had to reduce expenses. As a result, Pond was released on June 13, 1898. He was later re-signed by the Orioles and pitched a five-hit shutout against the Philadelphia Phillies. However, Pond could not remain with the team because on July 5, 1898, he had received an appointment as acting assistant surgeon of the United States Army and was ordered to report to Fort Myer the following Saturday.

After the Spanish–American War, Pond wanted to return to baseball. In February 1900, he wrote a letter to his old teammate John McGraw, who had taken over as manager of the Orioles, expressing his desire to return to the game. However, Pond would never appear in another major league game.

In 1902, while in stationed in Malabon, Pond served as manager of the all-black 25th Infantry Regiment's baseball team.

== Medical career ==
While in Baltimore, Pond took post-graduate courses at Johns Hopkins University, performed his residency at St. Joseph's Hospital and interned at Baltimore City Hospital. On July 5, 1898, Pond was appointed an acting assistant surgeon of the United States Army. He was sent to the Philippines with the 10th Pennsylvania Regiment. The United States Senate's decision to keep the Philippines as an American colony resulted in a guerilla war with the Filipino nationalists who had been fighting the Spaniards. When his regiment returned to the United States, Pond was ordered to stay in the Philippines with a regiment from Colorado. Pond was later assigned to the 4th Infantry Division.

On July 2, 1900, Pond married Elizabeth Gambrill in Rutland.

By 1902, the United States had suppressed the efforts of the Filipino nationalists. The United States Government in the Philippines, led by Governor-General William Howard Taft, then began working on to stop the spread of disease on the islands, including bubonic plague, cholera, smallpox, and leprosy. Pond and his wife remained in the Philippines to assist in this effort. On August 11, 1902, Pond was detailed from the Army to the Philippine Board of Health for cholera duty. In July 1903 he accepted a permanent position as medical inspector, where he helped in the cleanup of Manila City and the collection and segregation of lepers. In 1906 he was appointed first chief of the Southern Islands Hospital, 400 miles south of Manila on the island of Cebu. In Cebu, Pond also founded a hospital for lepers and vaccinated the island's entire population. He also became a social leader of Cebu's American community and helped popularize baseball on the island.

When World War I broke out, Pond received a commission as a major in the Army Medical Corps and assigned to the Medical Officers' Training Camp at Fort Benjamin Harrison. He was preparing to go to France in July 1917 when Governor-General Francis Burton Harrison, asked that Pond be allowed return to the Philippines. Pond was moved to Camp Stotsenburg, where he was assigned to the 9th Cavalry Regiment and the 1st Philippine Artillery Regiment. In August 1918 he was named post surgeon of the Cuartel de Espana and placed in charge of the dispensary at Fort Santiago in Manila.

On October 28, 1918, Pond reported for duty on the USS Warren, a transport bound for Vladivostok. The Warren arrived in Vladivostok on November 11. That same day the Armistice ending World War I was signed and the transport immediately returned home. Pond received his discharge on January 15, 1919. By that time he had attained the rank of lieutenant colonel.

After the war, Pond entered private practice in Cebu. He also engaged in several business ventures, including a coconut plantation, a cattle ranch on the island of Mindanao, and a navigation company, and as a result he became a millionaire.

== Death ==
On September 10, 1930, Pond underwent surgery for appendicitis in Cebu. The operation appeared to be a success; however, peritonitis set in. A wire was sent to the governor general requesting that an Army surgeon be sent from Manila, but an amphibious aircraft could not be found. After showing signs of improvement, Pond suffered a relapse and died at 9 a.m. on September 19, 1930, at the age 58.

On the day of Pond's funeral, flags were flown at half-mast and all businesses and banks were closed. Services were held at the Manila Lodge of Elks No. 761. Several prominent people attended the service, including Senator Sergio Osmeña. Pond's body was cremated at the army morgue.

Pond Parkway, a downtown thoroughfare in Cebu City, was named in his honor.
