= 1894 Temple Cup =

Pre-modern baseball championship

Team (Wins)	Manager(s)	Season
New York Giants (4)	John Ward	88–44–7 (.658), GA: —
Baltimore Orioles (0)	Ned Hanlon	89–39–1 (.694), GA: 3
- Dates: October 4–8
- Venue(s): Union Park (Baltimore); Polo Grounds (New York)
- Umpires: Bob Emslie, Tim Hurst
- Hall of Famers: Giants: John Ward (player-manager)‡ George Davis; Amos Rusie; Orioles: Ned Hanlon (manager); Dan Brouthers; Hughie Jennings; Willie Keeler; Joe Kelley; John McGraw†; Wilbert Robinson† ‡ elected as a player. † elected as a manager.

The 1894 Temple Cup was an end-of-the-year best-of-seven playoff between the National League champion Baltimore Orioles and runner-up New York Giants. The series began on October 4 and ended on October 8 with the Giants sweeping in four games.

This was the first form of a championship series in professional baseball since the 1892 World Series, which saw the first and second-half winners of the National League face off in a best-of-eleven playoff.

== Summary ==
New York won the series, 4–0.

Game	Date	Score	Location
1	October 4	New York Giants – 4, Baltimore Orioles – 1	Union Park
2	October 5	New York Giants – 9, Baltimore Orioles – 6	Union Park
3	October 6	Baltimore Orioles – 1, New York Giants – 4	Polo Grounds
4	October 8	Baltimore Orioles – 1, New York Giants – 7	Polo Grounds

== Game summaries ==
=== Game 1 ===
Thursday, October 4, 1894 at Union Park in Baltimore, Maryland
Team	1	2	3	4	5	6	7	8	9	R	H	E
New York	0	0	0	0	1	1	1	1	0	4	12	2
Baltimore	0	0	0	0	0	0	0	0	1	1	7	1
Starting pitchers: NY: Amos Rusie; BAL: Duke Esper; WP: Amos Rusie (1–0) LP: Duke Esper (0–1); Attendance: 11,720; Notes: Game duration: 1:55

=== Game 2 ===
Friday, October 5, 1894 at Union Park in Baltimore, Maryland
Team	1	2	3	4	5	6	7	8	9	R	H	E
New York	0	0	4	0	0	0	0	1	4	9	12	3
Baltimore	0	2	2	0	0	0	1	0	1	6	7	3
Starting pitchers: NY: Jouett Meekin; BAL: Kid Gleason; WP: Jouett Meekin (1–0) LP: Kid Gleason (0–1); Attendance: 11,000; Notes: Game duration: 2:00

=== Game 3 ===
Saturday, October 6, 1894 at Polo Grounds in New York, New York
Team	1	2	3	4	5	6	7	8	9	R	H	E
Baltimore	0	0	0	1	0	0	0	0	0	1	7	6
New York	1	0	0	0	1	2	0	0	X	4	9	5
Starting pitchers: BAL: George Hemming; NY: Amos Rusie; WP: Amos Rusie (2–0) LP: George Hemming (0–1); Attendance: 20,000

=== Game 4 ===
Monday, October 8, 1894 at Polo Grounds in New York, New York
Team	1	2	3	4	5	6	7	8	9	R	H	E
Baltimore	2	0	1	0	0	0	0	0	X	3	5	4
New York	1	0	1	3	5	1	5	0	X	16	20	5
Starting pitchers: BAL: Bill Hawke; NY: Jouett Meekin; WP: Jouett Meekin (2–0) LP: Bill Hawke (0–1); Attendance: 10,000; Notes: Game called on account of darkness.

== See also ==
- 1894 in baseball
- List of pre-World Series baseball champions
