= 1895 Temple Cup =

Pre-modern baseball championship

Team (Wins)	Manager(s)	Season
Cleveland Spiders (4)	Patsy Tebeau	84–46 (.646), GA: —
Baltimore Orioles (1)	Ned Hanlon	87–43 (.669), GA: 3
- Dates: October 2–8
- Venue(s): Union Park (Baltimore); League Park (Cleveland)
- Umpires: Tim Hurst, Tim Keefe, Jim McDonald
- Hall of Famers: Spiders: Jesse Burkett; Cy Young; Orioles: Ned Hanlon (manager); Hughie Jennings; Willie Keeler; Joe Kelley; John McGraw†; Wilbert Robinson† † elected as a manager.

The 1895 Temple Cup was an end-of-the-year best-of-seven playoff between the National League champion Baltimore Orioles and runner-up Cleveland Spiders. The series began on October 2 and ended on October 8 with the Spiders winning in five games.

In this second iteration of the Temple Cup, the NL pennant winning Baltimore Orioles, who were also in their second Temple Cup, once again lost to the NL runner-up team.

== Summary ==
Cleveland won the series, 4–1.

Game	Date	Score	Location
1	October 2	Cleveland Spiders – 5, Baltimore Orioles – 4	League Park
2	October 3	Baltimore Orioles – 2, Cleveland Spiders – 7	League Park
3	October 5	Baltimore Orioles – 1, Cleveland Spiders – 7	League Park
4	October 7	Cleveland Spiders – 0, Baltimore Orioles – 5	Union Park
5	October 8	Cleveland Spiders – 5, Baltimore Orioles – 2	Union Park

== Game summaries ==
=== Game 1 ===
Wednesday, October 2, 1895 at League Park in Cleveland, Ohio
Team	1	2	3	4	5	6	7	8	9	R	H	E
Cleveland	0	0	0	0	1	1	0	1	1	5	13	2
Baltimore	0	0	0	0	0	1	0	2	1	4	11	1
Starting pitchers: CLE: Cy Young; BAL: Sadie McMahon; WP: Cy Young (1–0) LP: Sadie McMahon (0–1); Attendance: 8,000

=== Game 2 ===
Thursday, October 3, 1895 at League Park in Cleveland, Ohio
Team	1	2	3	4	5	6	7	8	9	R	H	E
Baltimore	0	1	0	0	0	1	0	0	0	2	5	4
Cleveland	3	0	0	0	1	2	1	0	X	7	10	5
Starting pitchers: BAL: Bill Hoffer; CLE: George Cuppy; WP: George Cuppy (1–0) LP: Bill Hoffer (0–1); Attendance: Between 8,000 and 10,000

=== Game 3 ===
Saturday, October 5, 1895 at League Park in Cleveland, Ohio
Team	1	2	3	4	5	6	7	8	9	R	H	E
Baltimore	0	0	0	0	0	0	0	1	0	1	6	2
Cleveland	3	0	0	0	0	0	3	1	X	7	11	2
Starting pitchers: BAL: Sadie McMahon; CLE: Cy Young; WP: Cy Young (2–0) LP: Sadie McMahon (0–2)

=== Game 4 ===
Monday, October 7, 1895 at Union Park in Baltimore, Maryland
Team	1	2	3	4	5	6	7	8	9	R	H	E
Cleveland	0	0	0	0	0	0	0	0	0	0	5	0
Baltimore	0	1	2	0	0	0	2	0	X	5	9	0
Starting pitchers: CLE: George Cuppy; BAL: Duke Esper; WP: Duke Esper (1–0) LP: George Cuppy (1–1); Attendance: 9,100; Notes: Game duration: 1:55

=== Game 5 ===
Tuesday, October 8, 1895 at Union Park in Baltimore, Maryland
Team	1	2	3	4	5	6	7	8	9	R	H	E
Cleveland	0	0	0	0	0	0	3	2	0	5	11	3
Baltimore	0	0	0	0	0	0	1	0	1	2	8	5
Starting pitchers: CLE: Cy Young; BAL: Bill Hoffer; WP: Cy Young (3–0) LP: Bill Hoffer (0–2); Attendance: Less than 5,000

== See also ==
- 1895 in baseball
- List of pre-World Series baseball champions
