= List of pre-World Series baseball champions =

The 1886 series between the St. Louis Browns of the American Association and the National League "Chicagos" was billed as a "World's Championship" with a winner-take-all prize of the total gate receipts.

The modern World Series, the current championship series of Major League Baseball (MLB) between teams of the National League and the American League, began in 1903, and was established as an annual event in 1905. This article discusses major-league champions before 1905, including championship series contested in that era, primarily between teams of the National League and the American Association.

== History ==
Before the formation of the American Association (AA), which debuted in 1882, there were no playoff rounds—all championships went to the team with the best record at the end of the season.

In the initial season of the National League (NL) in 1876, there was controversy as to which team was the champion: the Chicago White Stockings, who had the best overall record (52–14), or the St. Louis Brown Stockings (45–19), who were the only team to have a winning record against every other franchise in the league. The teams agreed to play a five-game "Championship of the West" series, won by St. Louis, four games to one.

=== National League and American Association, 1882–1891 ===
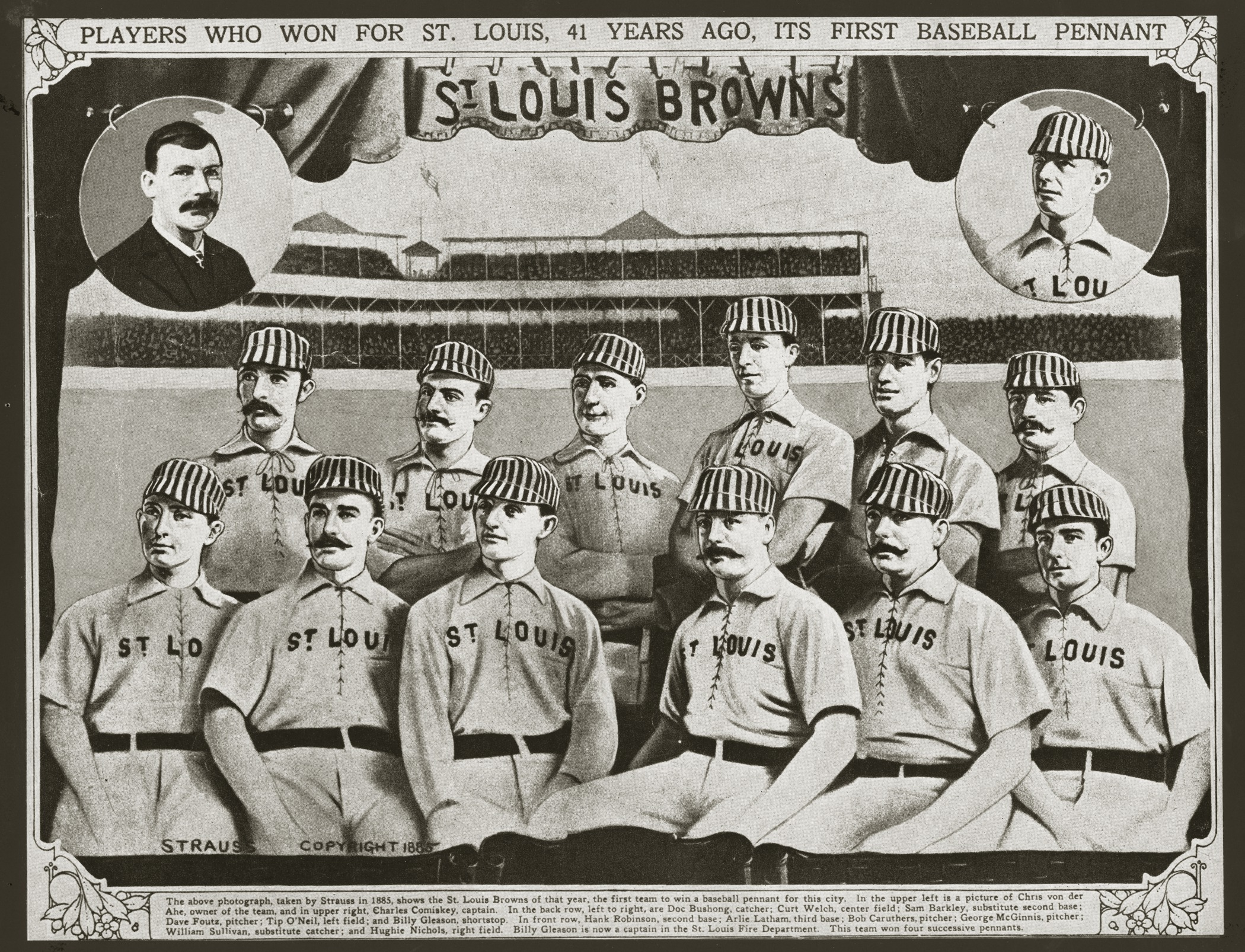
The 1885 St. Louis Browns of the American Association

Beginning with an exhibition series after the American Association's birth in 1882, a championship series between the NL and AA regular-season champions was promoted and referred to as the "World's Championship Series" (WCS), or "World's Series" for short; however, these series are not officially recognized by Major League Baseball as part of World Series history. Though early publications, such as Ernest Lanigan's Baseball Cyclopedia and Hy Turkin and S. C. Thompson's Encyclopedia of Baseball, listed the 19th-century games on an equal basis with those of the 20th century, The Sporting News publications about the World Series, which began in the 1920s, ignored the 19th-century games, as did most publications about the Series after 1960. MLB, in general, regards 19th-century events as a prologue to the modern era of baseball, with the birth of the present American League in 1901.

In the second year of the WCS, a dispute in the 1885 series concerned Game 2, which was forfeited by the St. Louis Browns (AA) to the Chicago White Stockings (NL) when the Browns pulled their team off the field protesting an umpiring decision. The managers, Cap Anson (St. Louis) and Charles Comiskey (Chicago), initially agreed to disregard the game. When St. Louis won the final game and an apparent series championship, three games to two, Chicago owner Albert Spalding overruled his manager and declared that he wanted the forfeit counted. The result of a tied WCS was that neither team got the prize money that had been posted by the owners before the series (and was returned to them after they both agreed it was a tie).

=== Series within the National League, 1892–1900 ===
Following the collapse of the AA in 1891, four of its clubs (Cincinnati, Pittsburgh, St. Louis, and Brooklyn) were admitted to the NL. The league championship was awarded in 1892 by a playoff between half-season champions. This scheme was abandoned after one season. Beginning in 1893—and continuing until divisional play was introduced in 1969—the pennant was awarded to the first-place club in the standings at the end of the season. For four seasons, the pennant winner played the runners-up in the postseason championship series called the Temple Cup. A second attempt at this format was the Chronicle-Telegraph Cup series in 1900.

== Champions before 1876 ==
Notes:

- A team's name links to an article about that team's season (rather than to the team in general) for 1871 and later.
- The only championship teams to last beyond 1876 (when the National League was founded) were the Chicago White Stockings (now the Chicago Cubs, NL) and the Boston Red Stockings (now the Atlanta Braves, NL).
- The Athletic of Philadelphia of 1860–1876 were not the same franchise as either the Philadelphia Athletics (American Association) of 1882–1890, or the former Philadelphia Athletics of the American League, which later became the Kansas City Athletics, the Oakland Athletics, and then simply the Athletics.
- Nor were the Atlantic of Brooklyn of 1855 to circa 1882 the same franchise as the Brooklyn Atlantics founded in 1883–1884 and later known successively as the Brooklyn Grays, Brooklyn Bridegrooms, Brooklyn Grooms, Brooklyn Trolley Dodgers, Brooklyn Superbas, Brooklyn Robins, Brooklyn Dodgers, and (since 1958) the Los Angeles Dodgers.

National Association of Base Ball Players				National Association of Professional Base Ball Players	
Year	Champions	Year	Champions	Year	Champions
1857	Atlantic of Brooklyn	1864	Atlantic of Brooklyn	1871	Athletic of Philadelphia
1858	Mutual of New York	1865	Atlantic of Brooklyn	1872	Boston Red Stockings
1859	Atlantic of Brooklyn	1866	Atlantic of Brooklyn	1873	Boston Red Stockings
1860	Atlantic of Brooklyn	1867	Union of Morrisania	1874	Boston Red Stockings
1861	Atlantic of Brooklyn	1868	Mutual of New York	1875	Boston Red Stockings
1862	Eckford of Brooklyn	1869	Atlantic of Brooklyn	The "White Stockings" became (1907) the Cubs, while the "Red Stockings" were later (1912) named the Braves.	
1863	Eckford of Brooklyn	1870	Chicago White Stockings	The "White Stockings" became (1907) the Cubs, while the "Red Stockings" were later (1912) named the Braves.	

== Champions from 1876 to 1904 ==
Notes:

- Italicized names refer to years when two teams and their managers could claim equal status as champion, either because they did not play a series against each other, or because they tied such a series.
- A third bracketed and asterisked number in a series score refers to a tied game, such as 3–3–(1)*.
- A dagger (†) indicates an exhibition series, such as in 1876, 1882 and 1883.

Year	Winning (or tying) team	Manager	Season	Games	Losing (or tying) team	Manager	Season	Notes
National League champions
1876†	St. Louis Brown Stockings †	George McManus	45–19	4–1 †	Chicago White Stockings †	Albert Spalding	52–14	† unofficial Championship of the West
1877	Boston Red Caps	Harry Wright	31–17	no Series	—	—	—	—
1878	Boston Red Caps	Harry Wright	41–19	no Series	—	—	—	—
1879	Providence Grays	George Wright	55–23	no Series	—	—	—	—
1880	Chicago White Stockings	Cap Anson	67–17	no Series	—	—	—	—
1881	Chicago White Stockings	Cap Anson	56–28	no Series	—	—	—	—
National League versus American Association champions — exhibition
1882†	Chicago White Stockings (NL)†	Cap Anson	55–29	1–1 †	Cincinnati Red Stockings (AA) †	Pop Snyder	55–25	† exhibition series
1883†	Boston Beaneaters (NL) †	John Morrill	63–35	canceled †	Philadelphia Athletics (AA) †	Lon Knight	66–32	† canceled exhibition series
National League versus American Association champions (The winners of the 1887-1891 seasons were awarded the Dauvray Cup.)
1884	Providence Grays (NL)	Frank Bancroft	84–28	3–0	New York Metropolitans (AA)	Jim Mutrie	75–32	1884 World Series
1885	Chicago White Stockings (NL)	Cap Anson	87–25	3–3–(1)*	St. Louis Browns (AA)	Charles Comiskey	79–33	1885 World Series
1886	St. Louis Browns (AA)	Charles Comiskey	93–46	4–2	Chicago White Stockings (NL)	Cap Anson	90–34	1886 World Series
1887	Detroit Wolverines (NL)	Bill Watkins	79–45	10–5	St. Louis Browns (AA)	Charles Comiskey	95–40	1887 World Series (Dauvray Cup)
1888	New York Giants (NL)	Jim Mutrie	84–47	6–4	St. Louis Browns (AA)	Charles Comiskey	92–43	1888 World Series (Dauvray Cup)
1889	New York Giants (NL)	Jim Mutrie	83–43	6–3	Brooklyn Bridegrooms (AA)	Bill McGunnigle	93–44	1889 World Series (Dauvray Cup)
1890	Brooklyn Bridegrooms (NL)	Bill McGunnigle	86–43	3–3–(1)*	Louisville Colonels (AA)	Jack Chapman	88–44	1890 World Series (Dauvray Cup)
1891	Boston Beaneaters (NL)	Frank Selee	87–51	no Series	Boston Reds (AA)	Arthur Irwin	93–42	(Dauvray Cup)
National League champions (The 1892 and 1893 series were for the Dauvray Cup, the 1894–1897 series for the Temple Cup, and the 1900 series for the Chronicle-Telegraph Cup.)
1892	Boston Beaneaters	Frank Selee	102–48	5–0–(1)*	Cleveland Spiders	Patsy Tebeau	93–56	1892 World Series (Dauvray Cup)
1893	Boston Beaneaters	Frank Selee	86–44	no Series	—	—	—	retired the Dauvray Cup
1894	New York Giants	John Montgomery Ward	88–44	4–0	Baltimore Orioles	Ned Hanlon	89–39	1894 Temple Cup
1895	Cleveland Spiders	Patsy Tebeau	84–46	4–1	Baltimore Orioles	Ned Hanlon	87–43	1895 Temple Cup
1896	Baltimore Orioles	Ned Hanlon	90–39	4–0	Cleveland Spiders	Patsy Tebeau	80–48	1896 Temple Cup
1897	Baltimore Orioles	Ned Hanlon	90–40	4–1	Boston Beaneaters	Frank Selee	93–39	1897 Temple Cup
1898	Boston Beaneaters	Frank Selee	102–47	no Series	—	—	—	—
1899	Brooklyn Superbas	Ned Hanlon	101–47	no Series	—	—	—	—
1900	Brooklyn Superbas	Ned Hanlon	82–54	3–1	Pittsburgh Pirates	Fred Clarke	79–60	1900 Chronicle-Telegraph Cup
National League versus American League champions
1901	Pittsburgh Pirates (NL)	Fred Clarke	90–49	no Series	Chicago White Stockings (AL)	Clark Griffith	83–53	—
1902	Pittsburgh Pirates (NL)	Fred Clarke	103–36	no Series	Philadelphia Athletics (AL)	Connie Mack	83–53	—
1903	Boston Americans (AL)	Jimmy Collins	91–47	5–3	Pittsburgh Pirates (NL)	Fred Clarke	91–49	1st modern World Series
1904	New York Giants (NL)	John McGraw	106–47	no Series	Boston Americans (AL)	Jimmy Collins	95–59	—
* tied game; † exhibition series Sources: World Almanac and Book of Facts, 1929, Baseball Almanac.com

== Totals ==
=== Championship of the National Association of Base Ball Players ===
Team	No. of championships	Years	Current status
Atlantic of Brooklyn	8	1857, 1859, 1860, 1861, 1864, 1865, 1866, 1869	Defunct (1875)
Mutual of New York	2	1858, 1868	Defunct (1876)
Eckford of Brooklyn	2	1862, 1863	Defunct (1872)
Union of Morrisania	1	1867	Defunct (1873)
Chicago White Stockings	1	1870	Chicago Cubs (NL)

=== Championship of the National Association of Professional Base Ball Players ===
Team	No. of championships	Years	Current status
Boston Red Stockings	4	1872, 1873, 1874, 1875	Atlanta Braves (NL)
Athletic of Philadelphia	1	1871	Defunct (1876)

=== Championship of the National League (through 1904) ===
Team	No. of championships	Years	Current status
Boston Red Caps/Beaneaters	7	1877, 1878, 1883, 1891, 1892, 1893, 1898	Atlanta Braves (NL)
Chicago White Stockings	6	1876, 1880, 1881, 1882, 1885, 1886	Chicago Cubs (NL)
New York Giants	4	1888, 1889, 1894, 1904	San Francisco Giants (NL)
Brooklyn Bridegrooms/Superbas	3	1890, 1899, 1900	Los Angeles Dodgers (NL)
Pittsburgh Pirates	3	1901, 1902, 1903	Pittsburgh Pirates (NL)
Providence Grays	2	1879, 1884	Defunct (1885)
Baltimore Orioles	2	1896, 1897	Defunct (1899)
Detroit Wolverines	1	1887	Defunct (1888)
Cleveland Spiders	1	1895	Defunct (1899)

=== Championship of the American Association ===
Team	No. of championships	Years	Current status
St. Louis Browns	4	1885, 1886, 1887, 1888	St. Louis Cardinals (NL)
Cincinnati Red Stockings	1	1882	Cincinnati Reds (NL)
Philadelphia Athletics	1	1883	Defunct (1890)
New York Metropolitans	1	1884	Defunct (1887)
Brooklyn Bridegrooms	1	1889	Los Angeles Dodgers (NL)
Louisville Colonels	1	1890	Defunct (1899)
Boston Reds	1	1891	Defunct (1891)

=== Championship of the American League (through 1904) ===
Team	No. of championships	Years	Current status
Boston Americans	2	1903, 1904	Boston Red Sox (AL)
Chicago White Stockings	1	1901	Chicago White Sox (AL)
Philadelphia Athletics	1	1902	Athletics (AL)

=== Winner of the World's Championship Series ===
Notes:

- Does not include the Temple Cup and the Chronicle-Telegraph Cup.
- Does not include the 1903 World Series.

Team	No. of championships	Years	Current status
New York Giants (NL)	2	1888, 1889	San Francisco Giants (NL)
Providence Grays (NL)	1	1884	Defunct (1885)
St. Louis Browns (AA)	1	1886	St. Louis Cardinals (NL)
Detroit Wolverines (NL)	1	1887	Defunct (1888)
Boston Beaneaters (NL)	1	1892	Atlanta Braves (NL)

== See also ==
- List of World Series champions
