= 1903 Los Angeles Angels season =

1903 Los Angeles Angels
- League: Pacific Coast League
- Ballpark: Chutes Park
- City: Los Angeles
- Record: 133–78
- League place: 1st
- Owners: James F. Morley
- Managers: Frank Dillon

The 1903 Los Angeles Angels season was part of the first season of the Pacific Coast League (PCL). The Los Angeles Angels had begun play in 1901 in the California League, joined the new league upon its inception, and won the first PCL pennant with a 133–78 record. Los Angeles won its first 15 games of the season and was never out of first place. They were the only team in the league to finish above .500. The team, frequently referred to as the Loo-Loos in its early years, played its home games at Chutes Park, an amusement park south of downtown Los Angeles.

In 2003, the 1903 Angels were selected by a panel of minor league experts as the fifth best team in the PCL's 100-year history. The team was also selected by Minor League Baseball as the 29th best team in minor league history.

== Position players ==
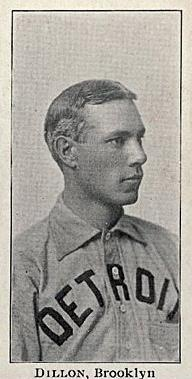
Frank Dillon

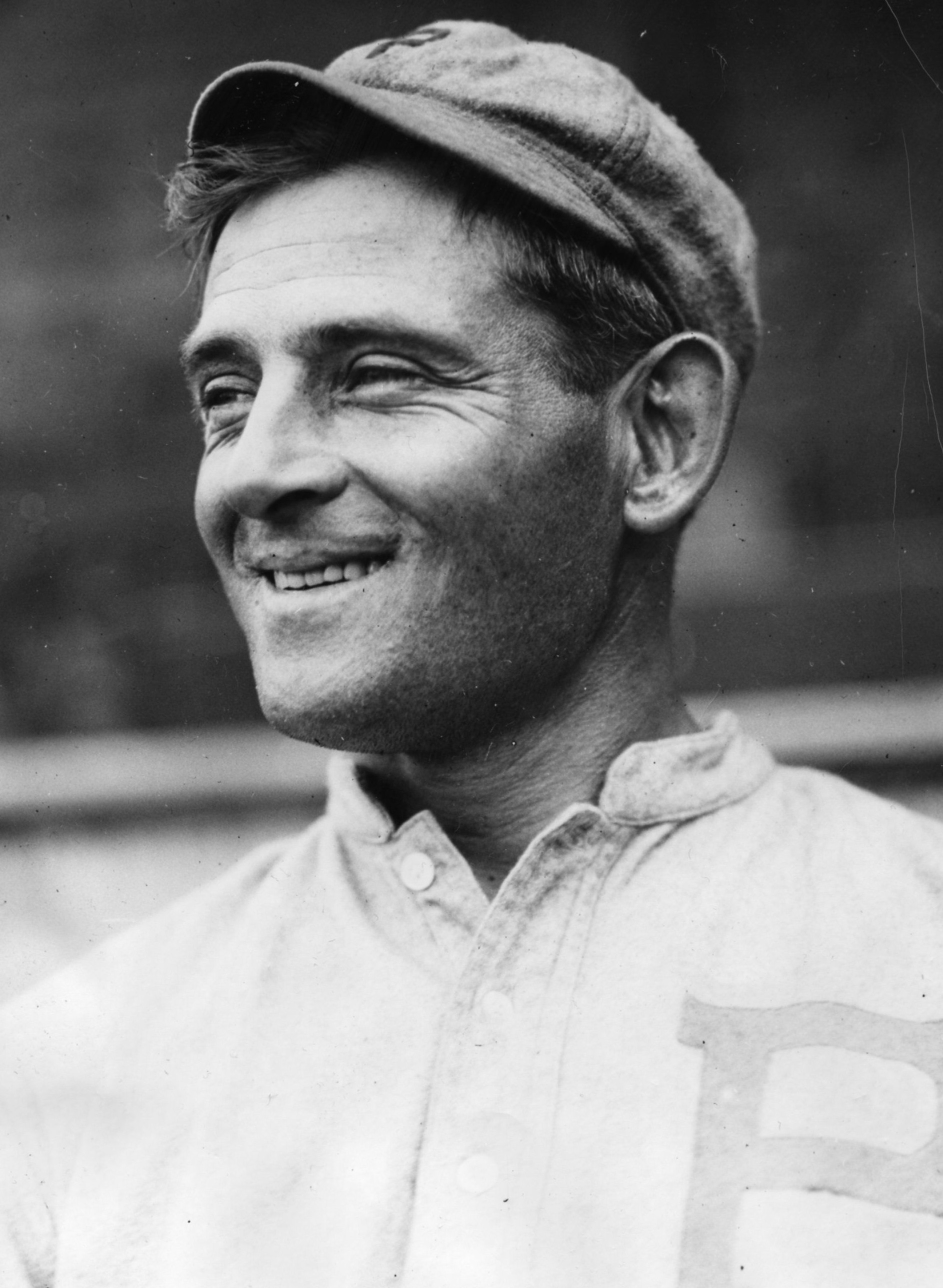
Gavvy Cravath

Frank Dillon was the team's manager and first baseman. He compiled a .364 batting average and led the PCL with 274 hits. The Angels' lead over its PCL opponents was so large that Dillon was able to leave the team late in August to be married and enjoy a honeymoon.

Second baseman George Wheeler appeared in 198 games, including 12 games a pitcher in which he compiled an 8–1 win–loss record and team-best 1.92 earned run average.

Third baseman Jud Smith led the PCL in both assists and total chances. He also was second on the team among the regulars with a .290 batting average.

Jimmy Toman was the team's primary shortstop, appearing in 172 games and batting .224.

Left fielder Art Ross was in his first of several seasons with the Angels and batted .288, good for 3rd on the team among the regulars.

Center fielder Dummy Hoy, at age 41, appeared in every game for the Angels and led the PCL with 157 runs scored. He was the most accomplished deaf player in baseball history, having played 14 seasons in Major League Baseball from 1889 to 1902. Hoy set major league records for career putouts (3,958) and total chances (4,625) by an outfielder. After the 1903 season, he retired from professional baseball.

Right fielder Gavvy Cravath, at age 22, led the team with seven home runs. Cravath remained with the Angels through the 1907 season, then played 11 seasons in the majors, leading the National League in home runs six times between 1913 and 1919.

Harry Spies was the team's catcher. He played in 184 games and batted .251.

== Pitchers ==
Doc Newton

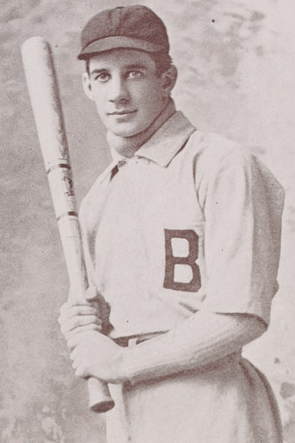
Joe Corbett

Pitcher Joe Corbett, the younger brother of world heavyweight boxing champion James J. Corbett, won 23 games and led the PCL with 150 strikeouts and eight shutouts. Corbett also appeared as an infielder and outfielder and was the team's second best hitter with a .336 batting average.

Two pitchers won at least 30 games: Doc Newton (34–12) and Warren "Rusty" Hall (32–19). Newton had played in the majors from 1900 to 1902 and threw the first no-hitter in PCL history on November 8, 1903. The only two hitters to reach first base did so on fielding errors. Hall was a workhorse who appeared in 53 games and pitched 468 innings.

== 1903 PCL standings ==
Team	W	L	Pct.	GB
Los Angeles Angels	133	78	.630	--
Sacramento Senators	105	106	.500	27.5
Seattle Indians	98	100	.495	28.5
San Francisco Stars	107	110	.493	29.0
Portland Browns	95	108	.468	34.0
Oakland Oaks	89	126	.414	46.0

== Statistics ==
=== Batting ===
Note: Pos = Position; G = Games played; AB = At bats; H = Hits; AVG = Batting average; HR = Home runs; SLG = Slugging percentage

Pos	Player	G	AB	H	AVG	HR	SLG
1B	Frank Dillon	190	752	274	.364	3	.479
P, 2B, OF, 3B	Joe Corbett	79	262	88	.336	4	.450
3B	Jud Smith	198	791	229	.290	1	.377
LF	Art Ross	198	747	215	.288	2	.332
RF	Gavvy Cravath	209	804	220	.274	7	.396
CF, LF	Dummy Hoy	212	808	208	.257	0	.334
C, 1B, RF, LF	Harry Spies	184	641	161	.251	2	.314
2B, P, SS	George Wheeler	198	757	171	.226	3	.339
SS	Jimmy Toman	172	594	133	.224	1	.291

=== Pitching ===
Note: G = Games pitched; IP = Innings pitched; W = Wins; L = Losses; PCT = Winning percentage; ERA = Earned run average; SO = Strikeouts

Player	G	IP	W	L	PCT	ERA	SO
Doc Newton	48	403	34	12	.739	2.43	146
Warren "Rusty" Hall	53	468	32	19	.627	2.31	100
Joe Corbett	41	347	23	16	.590	2.36	196
Dolly Gray	51	406	23	20	.535	3.55	91
Virgil Drinkwater	21	169	10	8	.556	2.72	44
George Wheeler	12	75	8	1	.889	1.92	21
