= Jouett Meekin =

American baseball player (1867–1944)

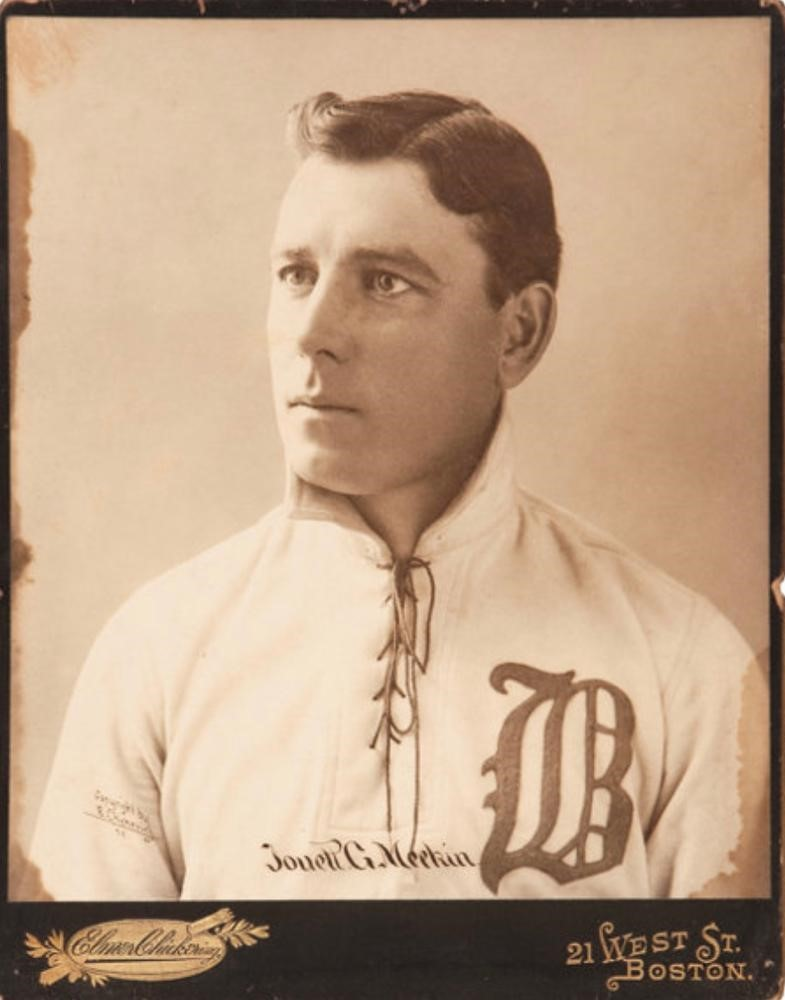
- Pitcher
- Born: February 21, 1867; New Albany, Indiana, U.S.
- Died: December 14, 1944 (aged 77); New Albany, Indiana, U.S.
- Batted: Right Threw: Right

MLB debut
- June 13, 1891, for the Louisville Colonels

Last MLB appearance
- June 8, 1900, for the Pittsburgh Pirates

MLB statistics
- Win–loss record: 153–133
- Earned run average: 4.07
- Strikeouts: 900
- Stats at Baseball Reference

Teams
- Louisville Colonels (1891–1892); Washington Senators (1892–1893); New York Giants (1894–1899); Boston Beaneaters (1899); Pittsburgh Pirates (1900)

Career highlights and awards
- Temple Cup winner (1894)

George Jouett Meekin (February 21, 1867 – December 14, 1944) was an American Major League Baseball pitcher from 1891 to 1900. He played for the Louisville Colonels, Washington Senators, New York Giants, Boston Beaneaters, and Pittsburgh Pirates. In 1894, he won 33 games for the Giants and helped lead the team to a championship.

== Career ==
Meekin started his professional baseball career in 1887, with Scranton of the Pennsylvania State Association. He then played three years with the Western Association's St. Paul Apostles. In 1891, he jumped to the Colonels. A hard thrower, Meekin led the American Association in strikeouts per nine innings. He was reportedly one of the three hardest-throwing pitchers of the 1890s, along with Hall of Famers Cy Young and Amos Rusie. That trio was probably the main reason why baseball decided to move the pitching mound back from 55 feet, 6 inches to 60 feet, 6 inches. Meekin was also a "head-hunter." He once stated that when facing a good hitter, the first two pitches should come "within an inch of his head or body."

Meekin posted several below-average pitching seasons early in his major league career; in 1893, he went just 10–15. However, in 1894, he was traded to the New York Giants. He immediately had the best season of his career, teaming up with Rusie to provide the ultimate 1-2 pitching staff of the era. Together, they led New York to a second place regular season finish. Meekin pitched 418 innings and compiled a record of 33–9 to lead the National League in winning percentage. He was second only to Rusie in wins and earned run average. His statistics also reflected both his speed and wildness; he ranked third in the league with 137 strikeouts but also finished third with 176 walks. In addition, he led all NL hurlers with 22 wild pitches. Meekin also hit three triples in a game that season, on July 4; this set a record for pitchers that has never been equaled.

After the 1894 regular season, New York faced the first place Baltimore Orioles in the Temple Cup series. Baltimore is considered by some to be the greatest baseball team of the 19th century, but Meekin and Rusie won two games each to sweep the Orioles in four straight.

Meekin fell off somewhat in 1895. Battling a sore arm, he gave up 30 hits in one game that year, losing 23–2 to St. Louis. For some reason, he was not removed from the game, even though several times, he "staggered when about to pitch." Meekin won just 16 games, and his earned run average rose 1.60 from the previous season. However, he rebounded for two more 20-win seasons in 1896 and 1897. In one game in 1896, Meekin threw the first intentional walk in baseball history, to slugger Jimmy Ryan. The strategy worked when the next hitter struck out to end the game.

In 1899, Meekin was sold to the Beaneaters, which caused an uproar with the Giants fans. Collusion was suspected between the two teams, but the trade went through. Meekin had short stints with Boston and Pittsburgh before finishing his career in the minor leagues. He pitched in semi-pro games in New York as late as 1905.

Meekin died in 1944, at the age of 77, in his hometown of New Albany, Indiana.

== See also ==
- List of Major League Baseball all-time leaders in home runs by pitchers
