= Fred Klobedanz =

American baseball player (1871–1940)

- Pitcher
- Born: June 13, 1871; Waterbury, Connecticut, U.S.
- Died: April 12, 1940 (aged 68); Waterbury, Connecticut, U.S.
- Batted: Left Threw: Left

MLB debut
- August 20, 1896, for the Boston Beaneaters

Last MLB appearance
- September 5, 1902, for the Boston Beaneaters

MLB statistics
- Win–loss record: 53-25
- Earned run average: 4.12
- Strikeouts: 181
- Stats at Baseball Reference

Teams
- Boston Beaneaters (1896–1899, 1902)

Career highlights and awards
- 2× National League pennant winner (1897, 1898); Led National League in winning percentage (1897)

Frederick Augustus "Duke" Klobedanz (June 13, 1871 – April 12, 1940) was an American pitcher in Major League Baseball. He played for the Boston Beaneaters in five seasons and had a lifetime major league win–loss record of 53–25.

== Career ==
Klobedanz, a "hard throwing, wild lefty," began playing semi-professional baseball in 1889, around the age of 17, and then started his professional baseball career in 1892. He played in the New England League for the next few years, mostly with the Fall River Indians and New Bedford Whalers.

During the 1895 season, Klobedanz married the former Annie L. Durfee of Fall River. If married life hurt his pitching, then it is not evident from the statistics because that season he won a career-high 28 games, batted a robust .377, and led the Indians to their third consecutive pennant. In 1896, Klobedanz had another good season, going 25–6 with a 2.38 earned run average, leading the league in wins and batting .353. He was then purchased by the National League's Beaneaters that August and pitched well in his first MLB action during the last several weeks of the season.

In 1897, Klobedanz went 26–7 to lead the majors in winning percentage. At one point, he won 14 consecutive games. His ERA was mediocre, but he was aided by the powerful Boston offense which provided league-leading run support; Klobedanz himself batted .324 that season. The Beaneaters won the pennant by two games, however they lost the Temple Cup series in five games to the second place Baltimore Orioles. In 2004, baseball analyst Bill James wrote that Klobedanz had the second-luckiest pitcher season of all time. According to James, Klobedanz actually "deserved" a win–loss record of 16–17.

In 1898, Klobedanz had a record of 19–10, helping the team to another championship. He started off slow in 1899, however, and was sold to the Eastern League in May. Besides another short stint with Boston in 1902, he remained in the minor leagues from 1900 to 1908. In 1902, he went 26–10 with a 1.29 ERA for the New England League's Lawrence Colts. His last winning season was 1906, when he went 18–10.

In 1909, he pitched for Hyannis in what is now the Cape Cod Baseball League. At age 38, Klobedanz was still pitching complete games and it was reported that, "to one who remembers him nine or ten years ago,...he seems as fit as ever."

Overall, Klobedanz won 234 games in the minor leagues to go along with his 53 major league victories. He died in 1940, in his hometown of Waterbury, Connecticut.
