= 1892 World Series =

Pre-modern baseball championship

1892 World's Championship Series
Team (Wins)	Manager(s)	Season
Boston Beaneaters (5)	Frank Selee	102–48–2 (.678), GA: 8½
Cleveland Spiders (0)	Patsy Tebeau	93–56–4 (.621), GA: —
- Dates: October 17–24
- Venue(s): South End Grounds (Boston); League Park (Cleveland)

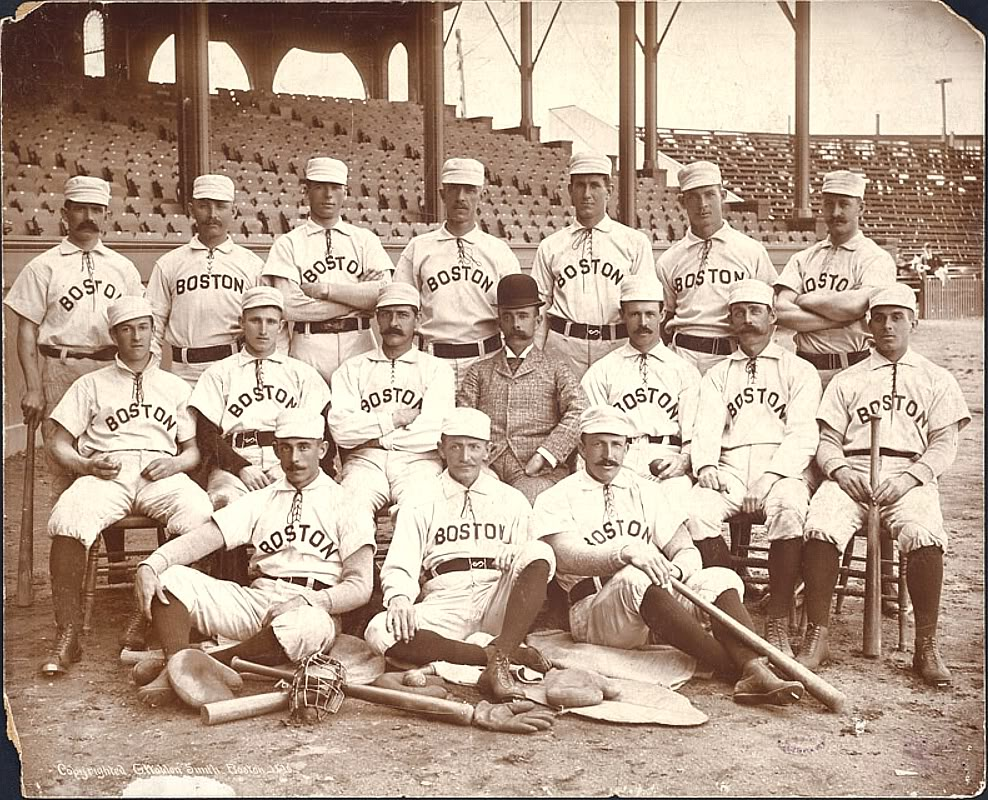
Boston Beaneaters

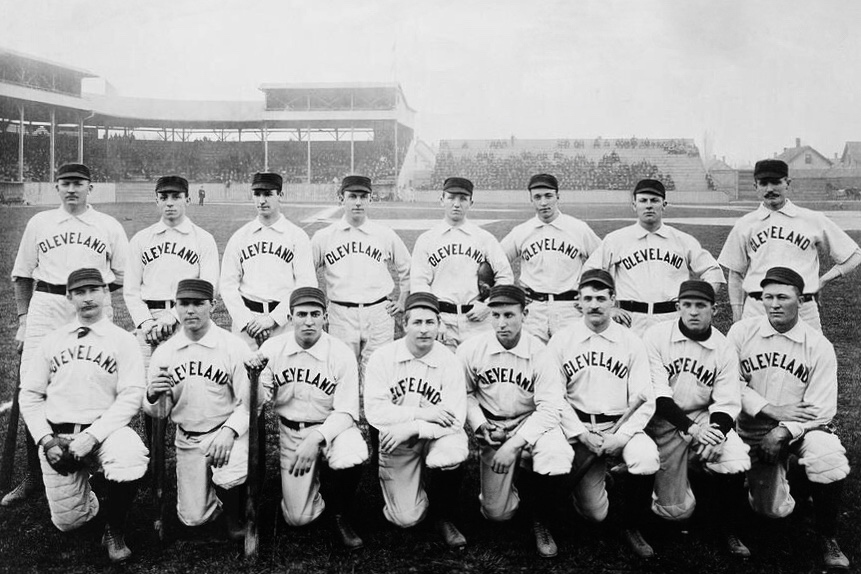
Cleveland Spiders

The 1892 World Series followed the first split season in National League history, with the first-half champion Boston Beaneaters (102–48) playing the second-half champion Cleveland Spiders (93–56) in a best-of-nine postseason series to determine the overall champion of the 1892 baseball season. After the first game ended in a 0–0 tie due to darkness, Boston won the next five games to win the championship.

Contemporary newspaper reports referred to the games as the "World's Championship Series" or "World's Series". This was the last of the pre-modern-era World Series, and followed similar annual postseason competitions held from 1884 to 1890 between the champions of the National League and the American Association (which collapsed after the 1891 season). Later, the Temple Cup would be awarded to the winner of an annual postseason series between National League teams, from 1894 to 1897.

== Background ==
Boston manager Frank Selee worried that late-October weather conditions would lead to postponements and low attendance. Cleveland's player-manager Patsy Tebeau suggested that "the [Boston] Beaneaters fear the humiliation of possible defeat." Tebeau told Sporting Life that the cold weather was a "dodge ... simply an excuse to avoid playing Cleveland."

Bookies had the Spiders as the favorite, due to their pitching staff. Cy Young had gone 36–12 in 49 starts, with a 1.93 earned-run average. Meanwhile, Boston star Mike "King" Kelly had a batting average of only .189 for the year, and was described as "one of the biggest failures of the base ball season".

== Series summary ==
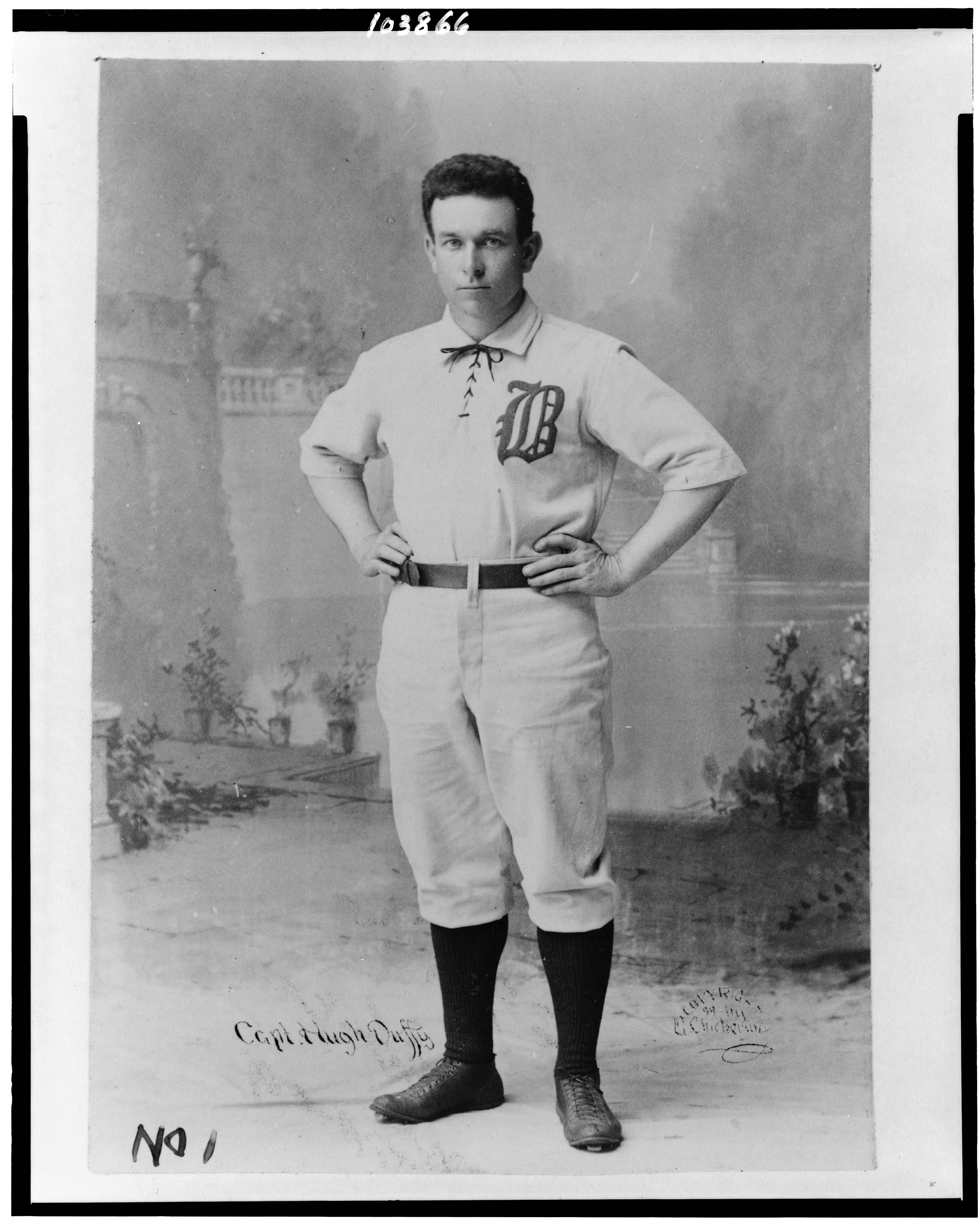
Hugh Duffy

Boston won the series, 5–0–1.

Game	Date	Score	Location
1	October 17	Boston – 0, Cleveland – 0 (11)	League Park, Cleveland
2	October 18	Boston – 4, Cleveland – 3	League Park, Cleveland
3	October 19	Boston – 3, Cleveland – 2	League Park, Cleveland
4	October 21	Cleveland – 0, Boston – 4	South End Grounds, Boston
5	October 22	Cleveland – 7, Boston – 12	South End Grounds, Boston
6	October 24	Cleveland – 3, Boston – 8	South End Grounds, Boston

Hugh Duffy of Boston batted .462 with nine runs batted in and six extra-base hits including a home run.

Had the series required more than six games to complete, the remaining games would have been played in New York City.

== Game summaries ==
=== Game 1 ===
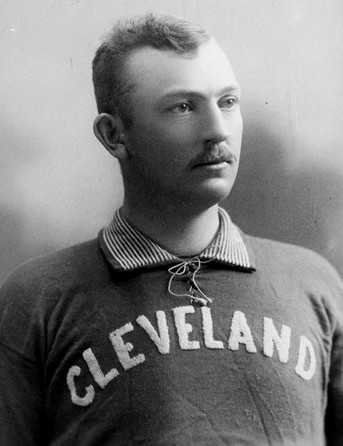
Cy Young

The first game, which had started at three o'clock, had gone 11 scoreless innings when it was stopped at five o'clock due to darkness.

October 17 (Monday) at League Park, Cleveland
Team	1	2	3	4	5	6	7	8	9	10	11	R	H	E
Boston	0	0	0	0	0	0	0	0	0	0	0	0	6	0
Cleveland	0	0	0	0	0	0	0	0	0	0	0	0	4	1
Starting pitchers: BOS: Jack Stivetts; CLE: Cy Young; Attendance: 5,800 to 6,000; Notes: Game duration 2:00; Game called on account of darkness. Umpires: Pop Snyder and Bob Emslie

=== Game 2 ===
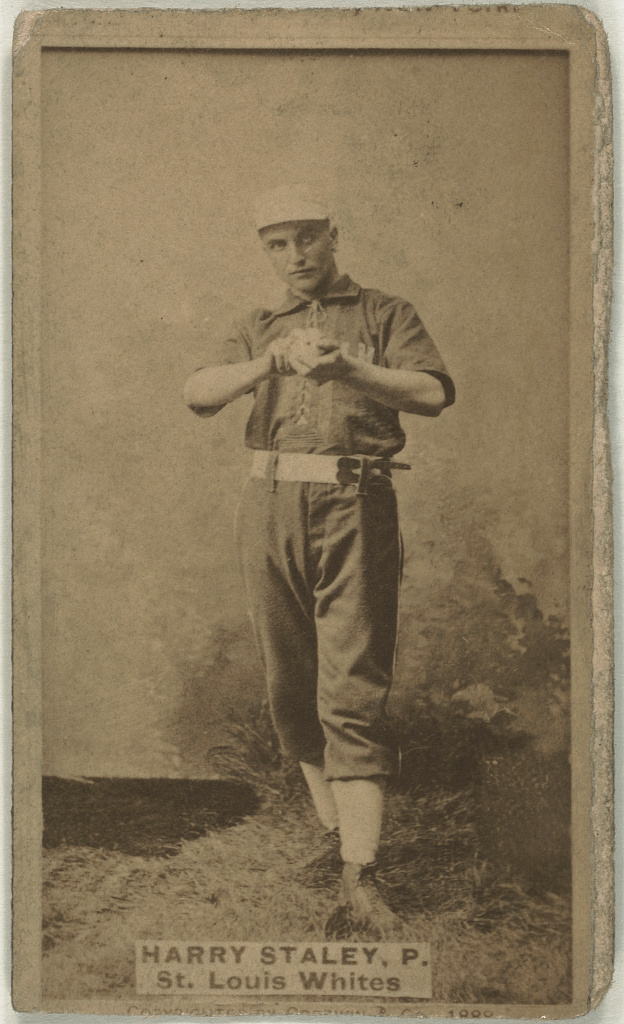
Harry Staley

October 18 (Tuesday) at League Park, Cleveland
Team	1	2	3	4	5	6	7	8	9	R	H	E
Boston	1	0	1	0	1	0	0	1	0	4	10	2
Cleveland	0	0	1	1	0	0	0	0	1	3	10	2
WP: Harry Staley (1–0) LP: John Clarkson (0–1); Attendance: 6,700 to 7,500; Notes: Game duration 1:35; Umpires: Jack McQuaid and John Gaffney

=== Game 3 ===
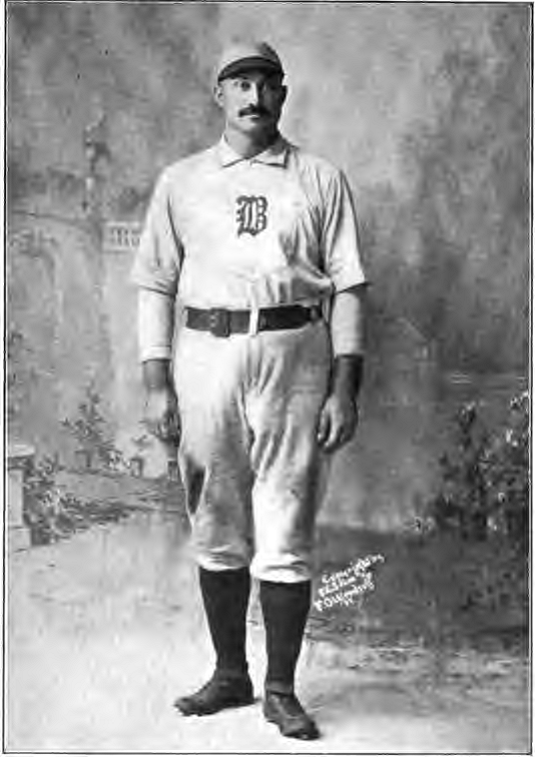
Jack Stivetts

October 19 (Wednesday) at League Park, Cleveland
Team	1	2	3	4	5	6	7	8	9	R	H	E
Boston	1	1	0	0	0	0	0	1	0	3	9	2
Cleveland	2	0	0	0	0	0	0	0	0	2	8	0
WP: Jack Stivetts (1–0) LP: Cy Young (0–1); Attendance: 7,500; Notes: Game duration 1:50; Umpires: Bob Emslie and Pop Snyder

=== Game 4 ===
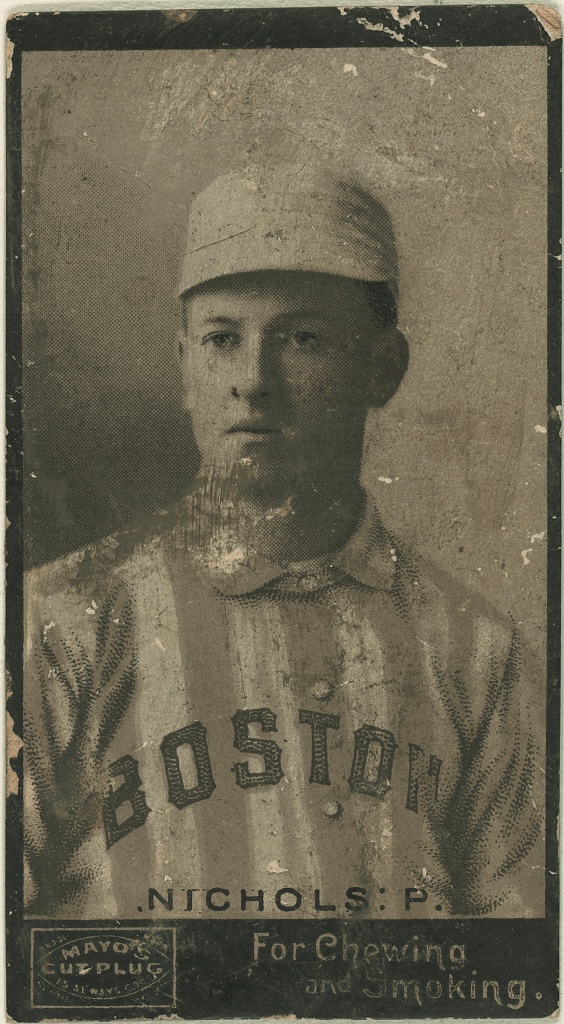
Kid Nichols

After a travel day for the teams, the series moved to Boston with the Beaneaters leading, two games to none.

October 21 (Friday) at South End Grounds, Boston
Team	1	2	3	4	5	6	7	8	9	R	H	E
Cleveland	0	0	0	0	0	0	0	0	0	0	7	3
Boston	0	0	2	0	0	2	0	0	X	4	6	0
WP: Kid Nichols (1–0) LP: George Cuppy (0–1); Home runs: CLE: None; BOS: Hugh Duffy; Attendance: 6,547; Notes: Game duration 1:48; Umpires: John Gaffney and Jack McQuaid

=== Game 5 ===
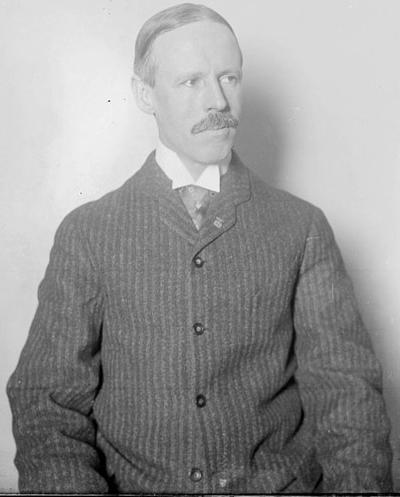
John Clarkson

John Clarkson started for Cleveland in place of Cy Young, who complained of a "lame arm".

October 22 (Saturday) at South End Grounds, Boston
Team	1	2	3	4	5	6	7	8	9	R	H	E
Cleveland	0	6	0	0	1	0	0	0	0	7	9	4
Boston	0	0	0	3	2	4	3	0	X	12	14	3
WP: Jack Stivetts (2–0) LP: John Clarkson (0–2); Home runs: CLE: John Clarkson; BOS: Tommy Tucker; Attendance: 3,400; Notes: Game duration 1:50; Umpires: Pop Snyder and Bob Emslie

=== Game 6 ===
Charlie Bennett

After an off-day (professional baseball games were not allowed on Sundays in Boston until 1929) the Beaneaters won their fifth game of the series to capture the championship. The 13 players on their roster split $1000 prize money.

October 24 (Monday) at South End Grounds, Boston
Team	1	2	3	4	5	6	7	8	9	R	H	E
Cleveland	0	0	3	0	0	0	0	0	0	3	10	4
Boston	0	0	2	2	1	1	1	1	X	8	11	5
WP: Kid Nichols (2–0) LP: Cy Young (0–2); Home runs: CLE: None; BOS: Charlie Bennett; Notes: Game duration 1:55; Umpires: Jack McQuaid and John Gaffney

== Aftermath ==
The National League abolished the split season format for 1893, and did not play another split season until 1981, which was caused by a players' strike.

Multiple participants in the series were later inducted to the National Baseball Hall of Fame:

- Jesse Burkett (Cleveland, OF)
- John Clarkson (Cleveland, P)
- George Davis (Cleveland, SS)
- Hugh Duffy (Boston, CF)
- King Kelly (Boston, C)
- Tommy McCarthy (Boston, OF)
- Kid Nichols (Boston, P)
- Frank Selee (Boston, Mgr.)
- Cy Young (Cleveland, P)

John Clarkson had started the season with the Beaneaters, and signed with the Spiders after being released at the end of June. Pitcher Lee Viau also played for both Boston and Cleveland during 1892.

The Beaneaters were later known as the Doves (1907–1910) and the Rustlers (1911) before adopting the nickname of "Braves" in 1912. The franchise relocated to Milwaukee in 1953, and then moved to Atlanta in 1966, where they remain members of the National League as the Atlanta Braves. The Spiders' final season was 1899, when they compiled a record of 20–134 (establishing a longstanding record for the worst major league season) after ownership moved their best players to the St. Louis Cardinals, and were one of four teams contracted out of the National League when the league reduced its size to eight teams prior to the 1900 season.

== See also ==
- List of pre-World Series baseball champions
