= Dauvray Cup =

Baseball trophy

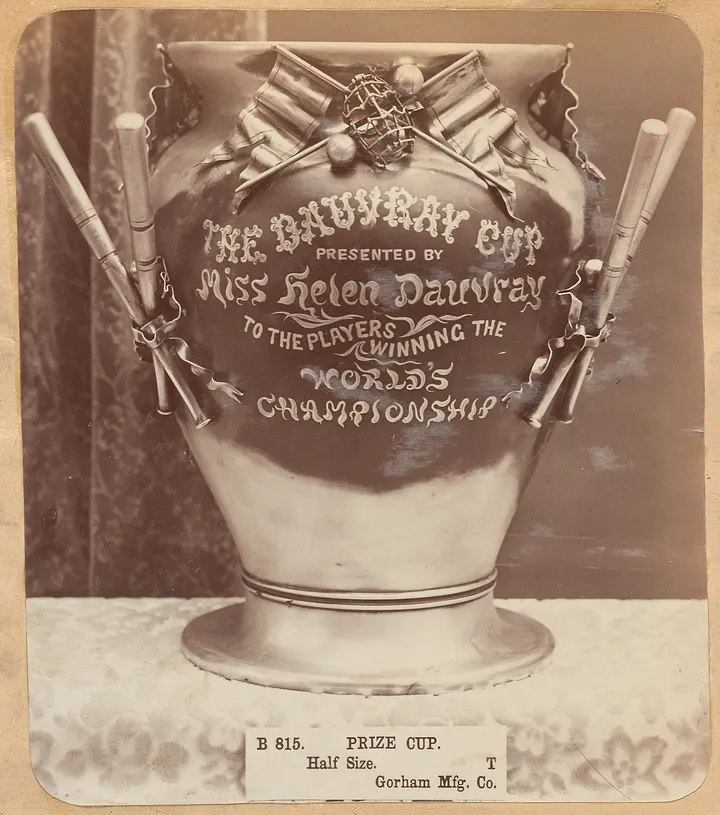
- First awarded: 1887
- Last awarded: 1893
- Current location: Unknown
- Last holder: Boston Beaneaters
- Most Cups: Boston Beaneaters (3)

The Dauvray Cup was a championship trophy awarded in professional baseball from 1887 to 1893. Named after stage actress Helen Dauvray, who presented the cup, it was initially awarded to the winner of the World Series between the National League and American Association. It was the first World Series trophy. The last National League-American Association series was in 1890, with the latter collapsing after the end of the following season. The cup was then awarded to the winner of the National League pennant. Like the Stanley Cup of ice hockey, the same trophy was used each season rather than a new one being made. The Dauvray Cup has since been lost.

== History ==
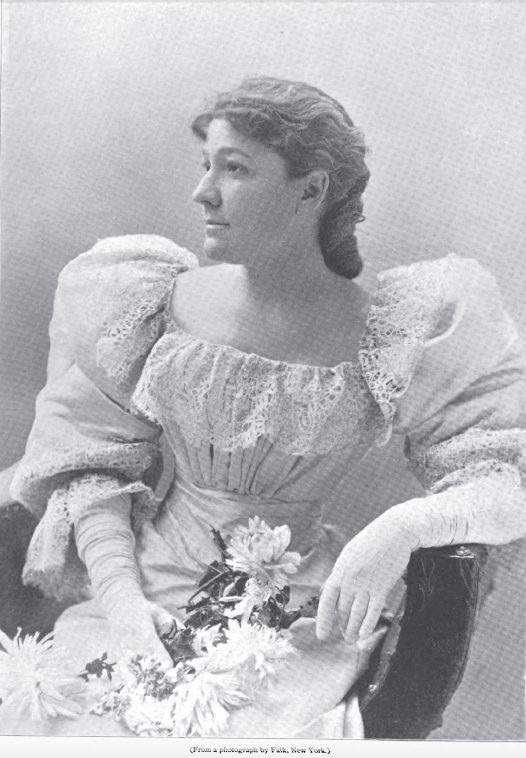
Helen Dauvray in 1896

The cup was named for its presenter, Broadway actress Helen Dauvray. In 1887, Dauvray began a relationship with John Montgomery Ward, shortstop for the New York Giants and future Hall of Famer. Their marriage was announced in October of that year during the World Series.

Dauvray first announced her intentions to present the trophy in newspapers on May 21, 1887. The announcement described the cup as "a $500 silver cup" in "the form of a true lovers' cup ... about twelve inches high". On June 1, the Gorham Silver Company began the process of creating the trophy. When some, including National League president Nicholas Young, suggested that the trophy was more for the owner of the winning team than the players, Dauvray agreed to award gold medals to the players of the winning team as well as one umpire. Some newspapers at the time, including the Brooklyn Eagle and Police Gazette, dismissed the trophy as a publicity stunt designed more to promote Dauvray herself than out of a fondness for baseball.

The Dauvray Cup was first won in 1887 by the Detroit Wolverines of the NL, who defeated the St. Louis Browns in the 1887 World Series. It would also be won twice by Ward's Giants, in 1888 and 1889. The cup was last awarded in 1893 to the Boston Beaneaters. The Beaneaters had won the cup three years in a row, having won the NL pennant in 1891 and 1892 as well. The rules established at the creation of the cup stated that it would permanently belong to the first team to win it three years in a row. Dauvray, by that time no longer much interested in either Ward—they would divorce in November that same year—or baseball, took no steps to provide a new Dauvray Cup to replace the retired one. A replacement would be provided by William Chase Temple, president of the Pittsburgh Pirates, which became known as the Temple Cup.

According to John Thorn, official historian of Major League Baseball, the last mention of the presence of the Dauvray Cup was on November 12, 1893, in Newport, Kentucky. By June 1894, Sporting Life was wondering in print what had happened to it. The current location of the Dauvray Cup is unknown.
