= Chronicle-Telegraph Cup =

MLB trophy and award

1900 Chronicle-Telegraph Cup
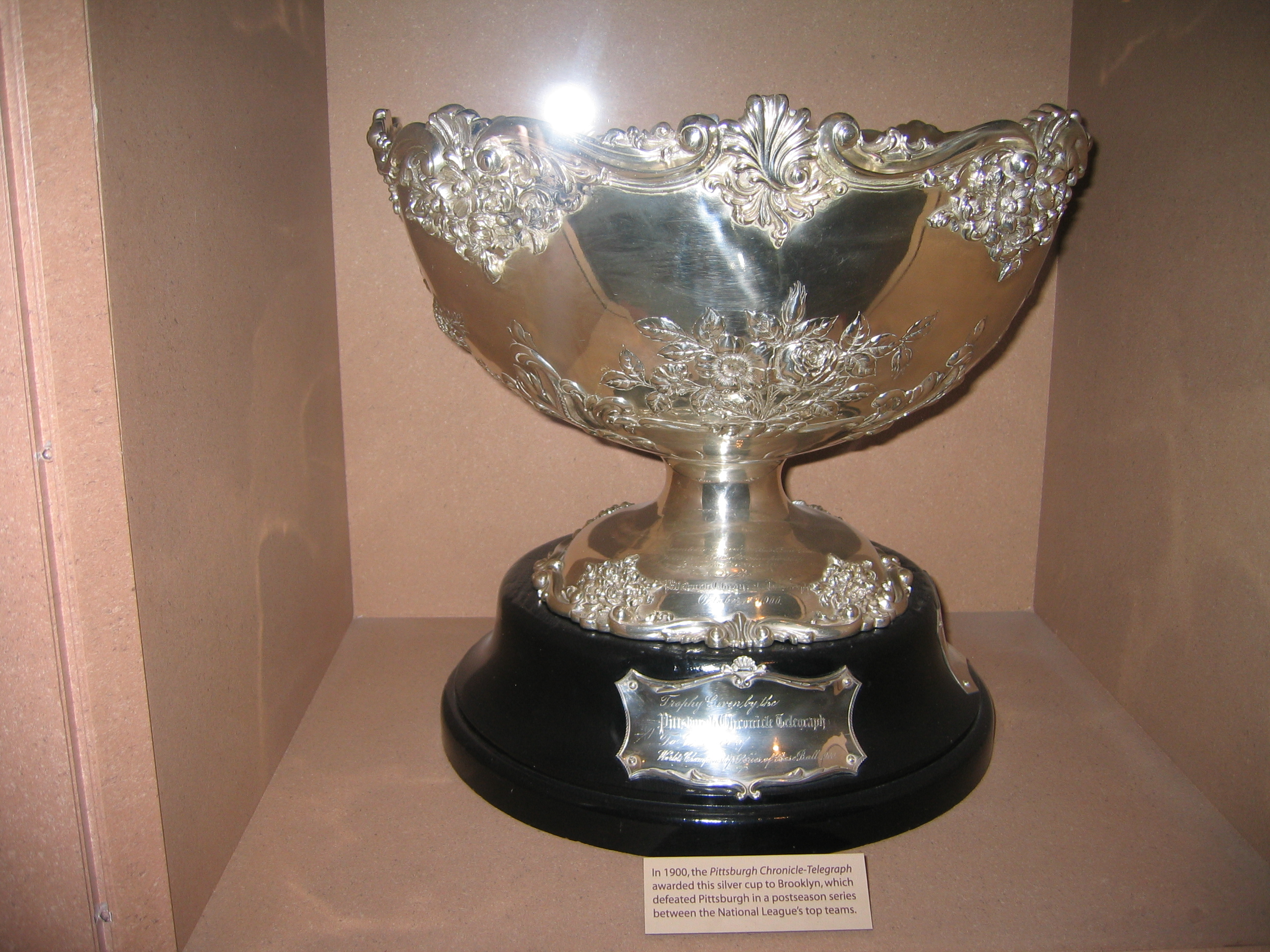
- The Chronicle-Telegraph Cup on display at the National Baseball Hall of Fame and Museum
Team (Wins)	Manager(s)	Season
Brooklyn Superbas (3)	Ned Hanlon	82–54 (.603), GA: 4½
Pittsburgh Pirates (1)	Fred Clarke	79–60 (.568), GA: —
- Dates: October 15–18
- Venue(s): Exposition Park (Pittsburgh); Allegheny, Pennsylvania
- Umpires: Tim Hurst, Ed Swartwood
- Hall of Famers: Superbas: Ned Hanlon (manager); Hughie Jennings; Willie Keeler; Joe Kelley; Joe McGinnity; Pirates: Fred Clarke‡ (manager); Jack Chesbro; Rube Waddell; Honus Wagner ‡ elected as a player.

The Chronicle-Telegraph Cup was the trophy awarded to the winner of a postseason competition in American professional baseball in 1900. The series, played only once, was a precursor to the current World Series.

The Pittsburgh Pirates finished in second place, 4½ games behind the Brooklyn Superbas, in the 1900 National League season (the only Major League in American baseball at the time). Fans of the Pittsburgh club felt their club was every bit the equal of the Brooklyn nine. While Brooklyn led the league in offense, Pirates fans claimed their team, which led the NL in strikeouts and ERA, boasted the pitching to best Brooklyn. A local newspaper, the Pittsburgh Chronicle Telegraph, offered to award a silver cup to the winner of a best-of-five series between the two teams.

Despite the series being held in Allegheny, Pennsylvania, which was annexed into Pittsburgh in 1907, the Superbas prevailed, 3–1. The teams were evenly matched in most statistical categories — both totaled 15 runs apiece, batted about .230 and had comparable numbers of extra-base hits (neither team hit any home runs) and walks. Both teams' ERAs were below 1.30.

However, Pittsburgh committed 14 errors to Brooklyn's 4, letting the Superbas win by comfortable margins. Three unearned runs in the top of the sixth inning of Game 2 allowed the Superbas to break a 1–1 tie, and Pirates pitcher Sam Leever's crucial fourth-inning error in Game 4 broke the game open for Brooklyn. A 10–0 blowout behind Deacon Phillippe's six-hitter in Game 3 gave the Pirates their only win in the series.

Pirates' outfielder Honus Wagner led his team in batting average (.400), hits (6), doubles (1), RBIs (3) and stolen bases (2). Brooklyn's Wee Willie Keeler also cranked out 6 hits to lead his club, posting a .353 average. The Superbas' Fielder Jones had 4 RBIs.

The Pirates won the next three National League pennants and played in the inaugural World Series in 1903. The Brooklyn baseball club did not win another postseason series until 1955, their first World Series championship.

== The series ==
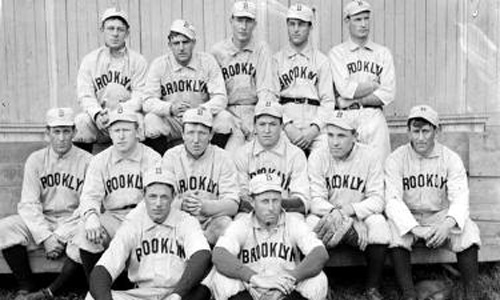
1900 Brooklyn Superbas

=== Game 1 ===
October 15, 1900

Two future Hall of Famers faced off as NL ERA leader Rube Waddell of the Pirates threw against Joe McGinnity, who led the league with 28 wins. McGinnity shut out the Pirates for eight innings before two unearned runs in the top of the ninth denied him the shutout. Waddell gave up 13 hits but only five runs, despite four errors by his fielders.

Team	1	2	3	4	5	6	7	8	9	R	H	E
Brooklyn	0	0	3	1	0	1	0	0	0	5	13	1
Pittsburgh	0	0	0	0	0	0	0	0	2	2	5	4
W: Joe McGinnity (1–0) L: Rube Waddell (0–1) Att.: 4,000

=== Game 2 ===
October 16, 1900

Fielding flubs continued to stymie the Pirates in the second game as they held Brooklyn only one earned run, but allowed three unearned in the top of the sixth thanks to a series-high six errors in the field. Brooklyn hurler Frank Kitson held Pittsburgh to four hits.

Team	1	2	3	4	5	6	7	8	9	R	H	E
Brooklyn	0	1	0	0	0	3	0	0	0	4	7	0
Pittsburgh	0	0	0	1	0	0	1	0	0	2	4	6
W: Frank Kitson (1–0) L: Sam Leever (0–1) Att.: 1,800

=== Game 3 ===
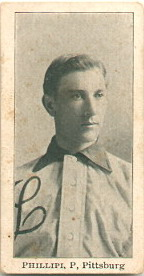
Deacon Phillippe pitched a six-hit shutout for Pittsburgh in Game 3.

October 17, 1900

Pittsburgh avoided the sweep by battering Harry Howell for 13 hits — all singles — and 10 runs. It was Brooklyn's turn to hurt themselves, as seven of the 10 runs were unearned. Deacon Phillippe threw a six-hit shutout.

Team	1	2	3	4	5	6	7	8	9	R	H	E
Brooklyn	0	0	0	0	0	0	0	0	0	0	6	3
Pittsburgh	3	1	0	0	2	0	1	3	x	10	13	1
W: Deacon Phillippe (1–0) L: Harry Howell (0–1) Att.: 2,500

=== Game 4 ===
October 18, 1900

Joe McGinnity was shaky in the final game, allowing nine hits, but the Brooklyn defense returned to form (they had the second-fewest errors in the league) as it allowed only one run to score. McGinnity did not allow an earned run in his two complete game wins during the series. Three Brooklyn singles coupled with a fielding error by Pittsburgh hurler Sam Leever in the fourth inning gave the Superbas a comfortable 4–0 cushion which they would not relinquish.

Team	1	2	3	4	5	6	7	8	9	R	H	E
Brooklyn	1	0	0	3	1	1	0	0	0	6	8	0
Pittsburgh	0	0	0	0	0	1	0	0	0	1	9	3
W: Joe McGinnity (2–0) L: Sam Leever (0–2) Att.: 2,335

== Series stats ==
=== Brooklyn Superbas ===
==== Batting ====
Player	G	AB	R	H	2B	3B	HR	TB	SH	BB	HBP	SB	DP	AVG	OBP	SLG	OPS	PO	A	E	PB	FPCT
Willie Keeler	4	16	0	6	0	0	0	6	1	1	0	0	0	0.375	0.389	0.375	0.764	6	1	0	0	1.000
Duke Farrell	2	8	0	3	0	0	0	3	0	0	0	1	0	0.375	0.375	0.375	0.750	12	0	0	1	1.000
Lave Cross	4	18	2	5	0	1	0	7	0	0	0	1	0	0.278	0.278	0.389	0.667	4	17	1	0	0.952
Deacon McGuire	2	8	1	2	1	0	0	3	0	0	0	0	1	0.250	0.250	0.375	0.625	9	2	1	0	0.909
Fielder Jones	4	18	3	5	0	0	0	5	0	1	0	1	1	0.278	0.316	0.278	0.594	7	1	0	0	1.000
Tom Daly	4	13	2	2	1	0	0	3	1	3	0	0	1	0.154	0.294	0.231	0.525	6	7	0	0	1.000
Bill Dahlen	4	17	3	3	0	1	0	5	0	0	0	1	1	0.176	0.176	0.294	0.471	5	12	1	0	0.941
Joe Kelley	4	17	2	3	0	0	0	3	0	2	0	0	0	0.176	0.263	0.176	0.440	10	0	0	0	1.000
Hughie Jennings	4	18	1	3	1	0	0	4	0	1	0	0	1	0.167	0.211	0.222	0.433	44	2	0	0	1.000
Joe McGinnity	2	6	1	1	0	0	0	1	1	0	0	0	0	0.167	0.143	0.167	0.310	0	6	0	0	1.000
Frank Kitson	1	3	0	0	0	0	0	0	0	1	0	0	0	0.000	0.250	0.000	0.250	2	1	0	0	1.000
Harry Howell	1	3	0	0	0	0	0	0	0	0	0	0	0	0.000	0.000	0.000	0.000	0	0	1	0	n/a
Totals	4	145	15	33	3	2	0	40	3	9	0	4	5	0.228	0.268	0.276	0.543	105	49	4	1	0.974

==== Pitching ====
Player	G	W	L	IP	H	SO	BB	WP	R	ER	WHIP	RA/9	ERA
Joe McGinnity	2	2	0	18	14	5	3	0	3	0	0.94	1.50	0.00
Frank Kitson	1	1	0	9	4	2	1	1	2	0	0.56	2.00	0.00
Harry Howell	1	0	1	8	13	3	2	1	10	3	1.88	11.25	3.38
Totals	4	3	1	35	31	10	6	2	15	3	1.06	3.86	0.77

=== Pittsburgh Pirates ===
==== Batting ====
Player	G	AB	R	H	2B	3B	HR	TB	SH	BB	HBP	SB	DP	AVG	OBP	SLG	OPS	PO	A	E	PB	FPCT
Honus Wagner	4	15	2	6	1	0	0	7	0	0	1	2	0	0.400	0.438	0.467	0.904	10	0	0	0	1.000
Claude Ritchey	4	16	3	5	1	0	0	6	0	1	0	0	0	0.313	0.353	0.375	0.728	6	9	0	0	1.000
Bones Ely	4	14	1	4	1	0	0	5	0	1	0	2	0	0.286	0.333	0.357	0.690	9	13	1	0	0.955
Ginger Beaumont	4	15	2	4	0	0	0	4	1	1	0	1	0	0.267	0.294	0.267	0.561	9	0	0	0	1.000
Jack O'Connor	2	4	0	1	0	0	0	1	0	0	0	0	0	0.250	0.250	0.250	0.500	5	0	1	1	0.800
Sam Leever	2	4	0	1	0	0	0	1	0	0	0	1	0	0.250	0.250	0.250	0.500	2	4	2	0	0.667
Jimmy Williams	4	14	0	3	0	0	0	3	0	1	0	0	0	0.214	0.267	0.214	0.481	4	8	7	0	0.417
Tommy Leach	4	17	4	3	0	0	0	3	0	1	0	0	1	0.176	0.222	0.176	0.399	13	1	0	0	1.000
Rube Waddell	2	5	0	1	0	0	0	1	0	0	0	0	0	0.200	0.200	0.200	0.400	1	1	0	0	1.000
Chief Zimmer	3	9	1	1	0	0	0	1	0	1	1	1	1	0.111	0.273	0.111	0.384	14	3	1	1	0.941
Tom O'Brien	4	16	1	2	1	0	0	3	0	0	0	0	0	0.125	0.125	0.188	0.313	34	4	2	0	0.947
Deacon Phillippe	1	4	1	0	0	0	0	0	0	0	0	0	0	0.000	0.000	0.000	0.000	1	2	0	0	1.000
Pop Schriver	1	1	0	0	0	0	0	0	0	0	0	0	0	0.000	0.000	0.000	0.000	0	0	0	0	-.---
Totals	4	134	15	31	4	0	0	35	1	6	2	7	2	0.231	0.273	0.261	0.534	108	45	14	2	0.908

==== Pitching ====
Player	G	W	L	IP	H	SO	BB	WP	R	ER	WHIP	RA/9	ERA
Deacon Phillippe	1	1	0	9	6	5	2	0	0	0	0.89	0.00	0.00
Rube Waddell	2	0	1	14	14	7	3	0	7	4	1.21	4.50	2.57
Sam Leever	2	0	2	13	13	4	4	0	8	1	1.31	5.54	0.69
Totals	4	1	3	36	33	16	9	0	15	5	1.17	3.75	1.25

== See also ==
- World Series#1892–1900: "The Monopoly Years"
- Temple Cup
- List of pre-World Series baseball champions
