= George Wheeler (pitcher) =

American baseball player (1869–1946)

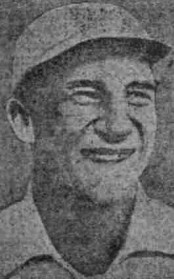
- Pitcher
- Born: July 30, 1869; Methuen, Massachusetts, U.S.
- Died: March 21, 1946 (aged 76); Santa Ana, California, U.S.
- Batted: Switch Threw: Switch

MLB debut
- September 18, 1896, for the Philadelphia Phillies

Last MLB appearance
- May 30, 1899, for the Philadelphia Phillies

MLB statistics
- Win–loss record: 21–20
- Earned run average: 4.24
- Strikeouts: 60
- Stats at Baseball Reference

Teams
- Philadelphia Phillies (1896–1899)

George Louis Wheeler (born George Louis Heroux, July 30, 1869 – March 21, 1946) was an American professional baseball pitcher. He played in parts of four major-league seasons, from 1896 to 1899, in the National League for the Philadelphia Phillies. Primarily a right-handed pitcher, Wheeler threw left-handed on a handful of occasions, making him one of the few known switch pitchers in major-league history.
