= Joe Corbett =

American baseball player (1875–1945)

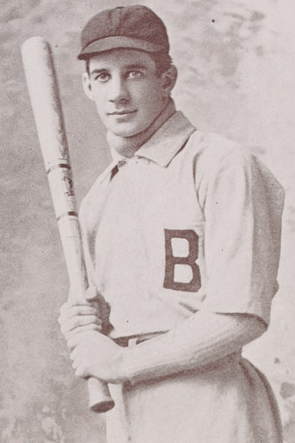
- Corbett in 1897
- Starting Pitcher
- Born: December 4, 1875; San Francisco, California, U.S.
- Died: May 2, 1945 (aged 69); San Francisco, California, U.S.
- Batted: Right Threw: Right

MLB debut
- August 23, 1895, for the Washington Senators

Last MLB appearance
- July 29, 1904, for the St. Louis Cardinals

MLB statistics
- Win–loss record: 32-18
- Earned run average: 3.42
- Strikeouts: 248
- Stats at Baseball Reference

Teams
- Washington Senators (1895); Baltimore Orioles (1896–1897); St. Louis Cardinals (1904)

Joseph Aloysius Corbett (December 4, 1875 – May 2, 1945) was an American Major League Baseball starting pitcher who played in the National League. He was born in San Francisco, California.

Corbett, the younger brother of World Heavyweight Boxing Champion James J. Corbett, played baseball at Saint Mary's College of California from 1890 to 1893 before breaking into the major leagues in 1895. He went 3–0 with a 2.20 earned run average for the Baltimore Orioles in 1896 and then won two games in the Temple Cup series. He had his best season in 1897 when he posted career-highs in wins (24), strikeouts (149), ERA (3.11), starts (37), complete games (34) and innings pitched (313.0). However, Corbett had gotten angry over a dispute with manager Ned Hanlon, and he refused to report to the team the following season. Hanlon welched on a bet and refused to buy Corbett a new suit for winning 20 games.

For the next five years, Corbett was a sportswriter for the San Francisco Call and pitched semi-professional ball. He signed with the Pacific Coast League's Los Angeles Angels in 1903. It was the league's inaugural season, and the Angels won the pennant by 27.5 games. Corbett went 23–16, 2.36, led the PCL in strikeouts (196), and tied for the lead in shutouts (8). He also hit .336 in 262 at-bats. Corbett went back to the majors in 1904 with the St. Louis Cardinals, where went 5–8, 4.39. Arm trouble developed because of rheumatism and he was released in August. He then joined the PCL's San Francisco Seals and went 14–10 with a 1.86 ERA during the rest of the season. He also pitched for the Seals in 1905 and then retired except for a brief comeback attempt in 1909.

He later coached baseball at Santa Clara University.

Corbett died in San Francisco aged 69. He was interred in the Holy Cross Cemetery in Colma, California.
