= George Cuppy =

American baseball player (1869–1922)

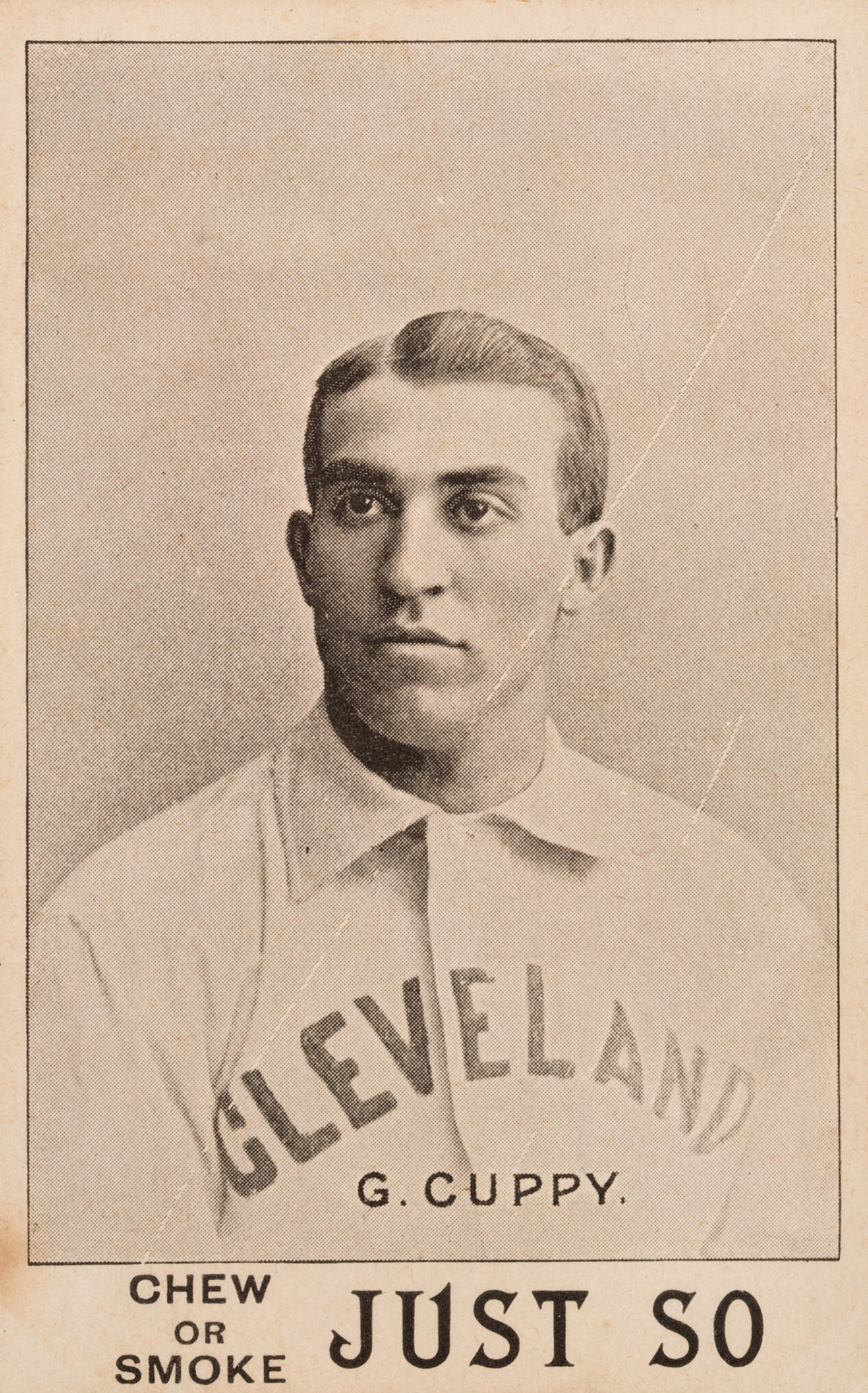
- 1893 baseball card of Cuppy
- Pitcher
- Born: George Joseph Koppe; July 3, 1869; Logansport, Indiana, U.S.
- Died: July 22, 1922 (aged 53); Elkhart, Indiana, U.S.
- Batted: Right Threw: Right

MLB debut
- April 16, 1892, for the Cleveland Spiders

Last MLB appearance
- August 7, 1901, for the Boston Americans

MLB statistics
- Win–loss record: 163–98
- Earned run average: 3.48
- Strikeouts: 504
- Stats at Baseball Reference

Teams
- Cleveland Spiders (1892–1898); St. Louis Perfectos (1899); Boston Beaneaters (1900); Boston Americans (1901)

George Joseph "Nig" Cuppy (July 3, 1869 – July 27, 1922) was an American professional baseball pitcher. In his 10-year major league career, he played mostly for the Cleveland Spiders, compiling a win–loss record of 163–98.

== Biography ==
Cuppy was born George Joseph Koppe in Logansport, Indiana, on July 3, 1869, to Christian Koppe and Christina Stieffenheffer Koppe. It is unclear when he changed his name, but "Cuppy" is the phonetic spelling of the German name "Koppe". His nickname was a reference to his dark complexion; before the integration of baseball, ballplayers with a dark complexion were sometimes nicknamed "Nig". Cuppy was of Bavarian descent.

Cuppy started his professional baseball career in 1890. In 1890 and 1891, he played for minor league teams in the Indiana State League, Tri-State League, and New York–Pennsylvania League.

Cuppy then joined the National League's Cleveland Spiders, and for the next few seasons, he was the team's number two starter behind Cy Young. In his rookie season of 1892, Cuppy had a win–loss record of 28–13 and an earned run average (ERA) of 2.51, a performance better than either of Young's first two major league seasons. The February 11, 1893, edition of The Sporting Life featured a drawing of Cuppy on the first page with the caption: "George Cuppy, the clever young pitcher of the Cleveland club."

In 1893, the distance between the pitcher's mound and home plate was increased from 50 feet (15 m) to 60 feet 6 inches (18.44 m). That season, Cuppy had a record of 18–10. In 1894, he went 24–15 and led the league with three shutouts. In 1895, he went 26–14, and in 1896, he went 25–14; he had the fifth-most wins in the National League during both seasons. Afterwards, his workload decreased, and he never won more than 11 games in a season again.

In three post-season appearances with the Spiders (1892, 1895, 1896), Cuppy had a record of 1–4. In three of his four losses, his teammates were shut out. On August 9, 1895, Cuppy scored five runs against the Chicago Colts in an 18–6 victory, the most runs ever scored by a pitcher in a major league game.

Cuppy remained with the Spiders until March 29, 1899, when the club's owners transferred him, along with the majority of the roster, to their other team, the St. Louis Perfectos. He spent only one season with the Perfectos before being sold to the Boston Beaneaters on May 23, 1900. The 1900 season was the only year of his career in which he did not pitch with Young. At the end of the season, in which Cuppy recorded a record of 8–4 and an ERA of 3.04, he moved across town to the newly formed Boston Americans of the American League.

The 1901 season, Cuppy's last in the major leagues, resulted in the only season in which he had a losing record, and he had a career-low 13 appearances. He was released by Boston in August 1901. Cuppy finished his major league career with a record of 163–98 and a 3.48 ERA in 2,283 innings pitched. He was known for taking his time between pitches while on the mound, which annoyed fans, umpires, opposing batters, and his own teammates.

Cuppy died at the age of 53, of Bright's disease, on his farm in Elkhart, Indiana. He was interred at Rice Cemetery in Elkhart.
