= Bob Emslie =

American baseball player and umpire (1859–1943)

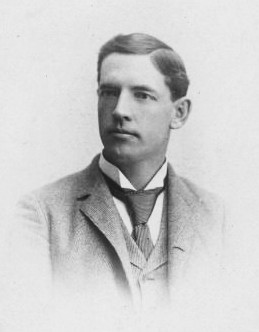
- Pitcher / Umpire
- Born: January 27, 1859; Guelph, Ontario, Canada
- Died: April 26, 1943 (aged 84); St. Thomas, Ontario, Canada
- Batted: Right Threw: Right

MLB debut
- July 25, 1883, for the Baltimore Orioles

Last MLB appearance
- July 16, 1885, for the Philadelphia Athletics

MLB statistics
- Win–loss record: 44–44
- Earned run average: 3.19
- Strikeouts: 362
- Stats at Baseball Reference

Teams
- Baltimore Orioles (1883–1885); Philadelphia Athletics (1885)

Member of the Canadian

Baseball Hall of Fame
- Induction: 1986

Robert Daniel Emslie (January 27, 1859 – April 26, 1943) was a Canadian pitcher in Major League Baseball (MLB) who went on to set numerous records for longevity as an umpire. Born in Guelph, Ontario, Canada, Emslie had a brief professional playing career with the Baltimore and Philadelphia clubs in the American Association.

His professional umpiring career began in 1888, and after spending a couple of seasons in the minor leagues, he was promoted to the major leagues as an umpire in 1890. Emslie was nicknamed "Wig" due to his premature receding hairline, which was a result of the stress of umpiring games single-handedly in the rough-and-tumble 1890s; he was derisively called "Blind Bob" by the New York Giants following his role in the infamous "Merkle's Boner" play during the 1908 National League pennant race. The play involved a force out when a Giants player stopped running to second base upon seeing that the game's winning run would score.

When "Merkle's boner" occurred, Emslie had already worked more major league games than any umpire in MLB history, then later served as the National League's chief of umpires upon retiring from active umpiring. He retired to St. Thomas, Ontario and died there on Monday, April 26, 1943. In 1946 he was included in the Honor Rolls of Baseball and in 1986 he was named to the Canadian Baseball Hall of Fame.

== Playing career ==
Emslie began his professional career playing for several semi-professional teams in Ontario until signing on with the Camden, New Jersey team of an early version of the Interstate League for the 1882 season. He pitched for them until middle of the 1883 season when he joined the Baltimore Orioles of the American Association. The first season with the Orioles, he had a 9–13 record, with 3.17 earned run average (ERA), 21 complete games, and one shutout. His best season was in 1884, when he had a 32–17 record, completed all 50 of his starts, and had a 2.75 ERA.

In 1885, Emslie's numbers greatly decreased with Baltimore, reportedly due to a sore arm, attributed to his excessive use of the curveball, at which he was moved to the Philadelphia Athletics also of the American Association. He pitched in only four games for the Athletics; his major league playing career was over, and by 1887 his minor league career was through as well.

== Umpiring career ==
After his playing career finished he was attending an International League game and was asked to officiate this game between Toronto and Hamilton when the assigned umpire fell ill. He umpired with the International League for the 1888 and 1889 seasons, then began his Major League Baseball career umpiring American Association games in 1890. He began the 1891 season in the Western League, but was back in the majors by August 17, working for the National League.

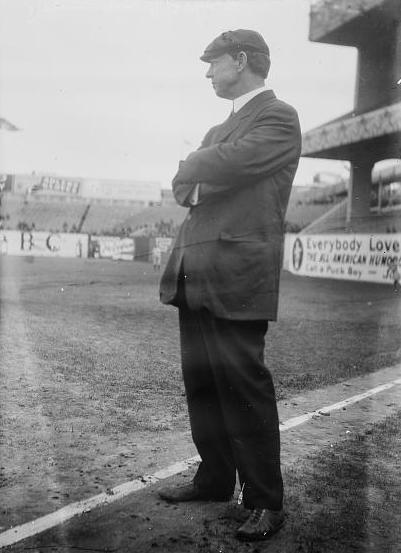
Emslie as an NL umpire in 1914

Emslie was involved in many of the game's highlights, including calling four no-hitters. The first one was on August 16, 1893, when Bill Hawke of the Orioles tossed his; the second was Deacon Phillippe's of the Louisville Colonels on May 25, 1899. The third no-hitter came on September 18, 1903, by Chick Fraser of the Philadelphia Phillies, and the fourth was tossed on May 8, 1907, by Francis "Big Jeff" Pfeffer of the Boston Doves.

He also officiated on July 13, 1896, when Ed Delahanty become only the second player to hit four home runs in one game. By the end of the 1909 season, he began to work the bases almost exclusively instead of calling games from behind the plate. In all, Emslie umpired for 33 years before retiring at the end of the 1924 season, after which he then served as NL chief of umpires, with the responsibilities of inspecting, scouting, and coaching new umpires.

=== The Merkle incident ===
Emslie was the base umpire on September 23, 1908, when controversy erupted at the end of the New York Giants–Chicago Cubs game at the Polo Grounds. With the score tied and two outs in the bottom of the ninth inning, the Giants had Moose McCormick on third base and Fred Merkle on first base; Al Bridwell smashed a single to center to drive home McCormick with the apparent winning run, but Merkle failed to touch second base. Cubs second baseman Johnny Evers noticed this error, and tagged second base and appealed to Emslie. Emslie claimed that he had to duck out of the way of Bridwell's line drive and did not see the play, and home plate umpire Hank O'Day declared Merkle out and the game a tie.

New York manager John McGraw, with whom Bob had a long and tempestuous history, bestowed upon Emslie his nickname "Blind Bob" after the controversy. The incident is often referred to as "Merkle's Boner." Notably, Emslie and O'Day were the two most experienced umpires in Major League Baseball history at that point, with Emslie having worked nearly 2,500 games and O'Day nearly 1,700. Later, Emslie showed up at a Giants' practice with a rifle, placed a dime on the pitching mound and shot it from behind home plate, sending the coin spinning into the outfield. Reportedly, McGraw never again challenged his eyesight.

=== Other activities ===
Emslie was also president of the Canadian Grand International Trap Shoot, notably in charge of a large meet in St. Thomas, Ontario in December 1916.

== Post-career ==
He retired to St. Thomas, Ontario, where he coached youth baseball and enjoyed curling, bowling, and golf. Emslie died at age 84 in St. Thomas, Ontario, and was interred at the St. Thomas West Avenue Cemetery. He was inducted into the Canadian Baseball Hall of Fame in 1986. Emslie Field in St. Thomas is named in his honor.
