= Union Park (Baltimore) =

Former baseball ground in Baltimore, Maryland, US

Coordinates: 39°19′5″N 76°36′46″W

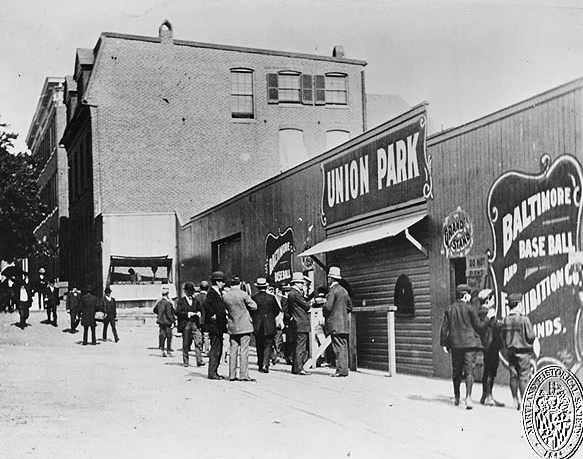
Exterior of Union Park in 1895.

Union Park is a former baseball ground located in Baltimore, Maryland. The ground was home to the Baltimore Orioles during their first "glory years" in the 1890s. It was located in an area bounded by East 25th Street to the north, 24th Street to the south, Hunter Street to the west and Barclay Street to the east. Guilford Avenue teed into 24th from the south, behind right-center field.

The Orioles opened this park during the 1891 season, abandoning Oriole Park. Their first game there was on May 11, 1891, an 8–4 victory over the St. Louis Browns in front of over 10,000 fans. At that time they were playing in the then-major American Association. After that season, the Association folded, and four of its teams were absorbed into the National League, including the Orioles. The Orioles became a perennial contender during that time. Despite that success, they were dropped when the National League contracted after the 1899 season. The legacy of those Orioles lived on through the later achievements of their many Hall of Fame players, such as John McGraw, Wilbert Robinson, Hughie Jennings and Willie Keeler.

Sanborn map outline of the ballpark

Slugger Dan Brouthers played first base for the Orioles during the 1894 and 1895 seasons. On June 16, 1894, he hit a home run over the distant center field fence, the ball landing on Guilford Avenue and finally rolling to a stop at 23rd Street. The Baltimore Sun for April 18 described it as "the longest ever made on the grounds." Decades later, the blow was still being talked about, and due to the distance it rolled was facetiously described as a 1,300 foot homer.

There was a destructive fire on January 14, 1895, which destroyed the grandstand and a clubhouse. The structure was rebuilt and the Orioles were able to continue to use ballpark for their remaining seasons.

Today the site is a residential area of Barclay with 321 East 25th Street once located next to the grandstand. That and other buildings visible in the background of the 1890s photo of the ballpark's exterior still stand today.

Union Park in 1897

== See also ==
- Temple Cup

== Sources ==
- Bready, James H. (1958). The Home Team: A Full Century of Baseball in Baltimore, 1859-1959.
