= Bill Hoffer =

American baseball player (1870–1959)

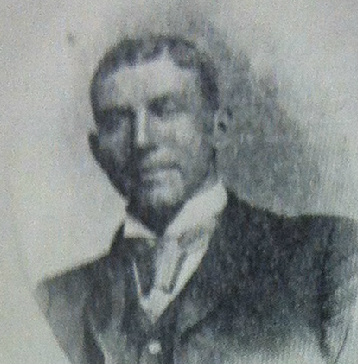
- Hoffer, c. 1891
- Pitcher
- Born: November 8, 1870; Cedar Rapids, Iowa, U.S.
- Died: July 21, 1959 (aged 88); Cedar Rapids, Iowa, U.S.
- Batted: Right Threw: Right

MLB debut
- April 26, 1895, for the Baltimore Orioles

Last MLB appearance
- July 4, 1901, for the Cleveland Blues

MLB statistics
- Win–loss record: 92–46
- Earned run average: 3.75
- Strikeouts: 314
- Stats at Baseball Reference

Teams
- Baltimore Orioles (1895–1898); Pittsburgh Pirates (1898–1899); Cleveland Blues (1901)

Career highlights and awards
- AL saves leader (1901)

William Leopold Hoffer (November 8, 1870 – July 21, 1959) was an American professional baseball player. He was a right-handed pitcher over parts of six seasons (1895–1899, 1901) with the Baltimore Orioles, Pittsburgh Pirates and Cleveland Blues. For his career, he compiled a 92–46 record in 161 appearances, with a 3.75 earned run average and 314 strikeouts. In 1901 he achieved the dubious honor of being the losing pitcher in the American League's first game.

In his rookie year, 1895, he compiled 31 wins (including a league-leading four shutouts) for the League-winning Orioles. He led the National League in Winning Percentage in 1895 and 1896.

He was born and later died in Cedar Rapids, Iowa, at the age of 88.

== See also ==
- List of Major League Baseball annual saves leaders
