= Temple Cup =

American baseball postseason series (1894-1897)

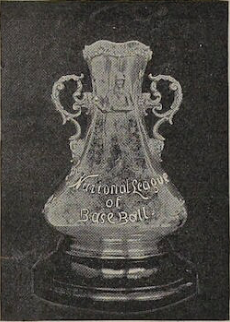
- Temple Cup, as shown on 1894 sheet music
- Sport: Baseball
- League: National League
- Awarded for: Postseason champion
- Sponsored by: William Chase Temple
- Country: United States

History
- First award: 1894
- Editions: 4
- Final award: 1897
- First winner: New York Giants (1894)
- Most wins: Baltimore Orioles (2)
- Most recent: Baltimore Orioles (1897)

The Temple Cup was a cup awarded to the winner of an annual best-of-seven postseason championship series for American professional baseball from 1894 to 1897. Competing teams were exclusively from the National League, which had been founded in 1876 as the National League of Professional Baseball Clubs. There was only one major league at the time, following the folding of the American Association after the 1891 season, and the series was played between the first and second-place teams of the surviving National League. The series played for the Temple Cup was also known as the "World's Championship Series".

The approximately 30-inch-high (76 cm) silver cup cost $800 (equivalent to $29,000 in 2025) and was donated by coal, citrus, and lumber baron William Chase Temple (1862–1917), a part-owner of the Pittsburgh Pirates at the time. The Temple Cup is now in the collection of the National Baseball Hall of Fame and Museum.

== History ==
William Chase Temple

In the 1880s, there had been postseason play between the winners of the National League and the American Association, but following the 1891 season, the National League absorbed the Association, becoming a 12-team league. In 1892, the National League played split season followed by a postseason championship series, but then abandoned split season. In 1893, the Pittsburgh Pirates finished second to the Boston Beaneaters. The Pirates' president, William Chase Temple, felt that his team should have the option of having a playoff series to claim the title. As a result, Temple had an $800 trophy minted and he donated it to the league.

Much like the long running Stanley Cup of the National Hockey League and the Temple Cup's baseball predecessor, the Dauvray Cup (awarded 1887–1893), there was only one actual Temple Cup to be passed along to each baseball season's winning team and city. If any team had won three titles, that team would have gained permanent possession of the Cup.

Revenue from the Temple Cup series was to be split 65% to 35% between the winner and the loser, but the players of the first series agreed to split the money evenly. However, after that 1894 series, the New York Giants cheated some Baltimore Orioles players out of their money, tainting the Cup and prompting Temple to sell the Pirates in disgust.

The Baltimore Orioles appeared in every Temple Cup series, winning the last two and thus coming the closest to gaining permanent possession of the trophy. Having moved over to the National League with several other strong American Association franchises, the Baltimore teams continued to win, capturing three National League pennants in a row (1894–1896) and winning the Temple Cup in 1896 and 1897. Owner/manager Ned Hanlon (1857–1937), a Baltimorean and considered one of the most talented baseball men of the sport's early era, ran the team with players like "Wee Willie" Keeler (1872–1923), Wilbert Robinson (1863–1934), and John McGraw (1873–1934).

Lack of enthusiasm on the part of the players doomed the series; their apathy spread to the fans, few of whom attended Temple Cup games in later years. Interest in the series faded quickly, as it seemed artificial, with the second-place team winning three of the four series. The last Temple Cup series was played in 1897, although the concept was revived in 1900 with the Chronicle-Telegraph Cup. After the Temple Cup series ended, the National League returned the trophy to Temple, whose Pirates team never finished higher than sixth place in the standings during the Cup's existence.

John McGraw of the Temple Cup-winning Orioles was later player/manager/owner with another franchise also known as the Baltimore Orioles, one of the eight original franchises of the American League upon its founding in 1901 and the third franchise to carry the Orioles name, prior to folding after two seasons. In 1903, a "peace pact" between the National League and American League resulted in each recognizing the other as equal in stature. The leagues accepted a joint policy on player contracts, and initiated a postseason series between their champions, beginning the modern interleague World Series.

In 1939, The Sporting News tracked down the Temple Cup, finding it in the possession of Temple's daughter in Winter Park, Florida. That year, the Cup was included in a large display of sports trophies at the New York World's Fair. In 1951, Temple's daughter donated the Cup to the National Baseball Hall of Fame and Museum, where it remains today in Cooperstown, New York.

== Temple Cup series results ==
Winning team is denoted in bold font. The regular season record of each team is noted in parentheses.

Season	First-place team	Series (games)	Second-place team	Ref.
1894	Baltimore Orioles (89–39)	0–4	**New York Giants** (88–44)	
1895	Baltimore Orioles (87–43)	1–4	**Cleveland Spiders** (84–46)	
1896	**Baltimore Orioles** (90–39)	4–0	Cleveland Spiders (80–48)	
1897	Boston Beaneaters (93–39)	1–4	**Baltimore Orioles** (90–40)	

=== Appearances ===
No.	Franchise	Record
4	Baltimore Orioles	2–2 (.500)
2	Cleveland Spiders	1–1 (.500)
1	New York Giants	1–0 (1.000)
1	Boston Beaneaters	0–1 (.000)

== Temple Cup winners gallery ==
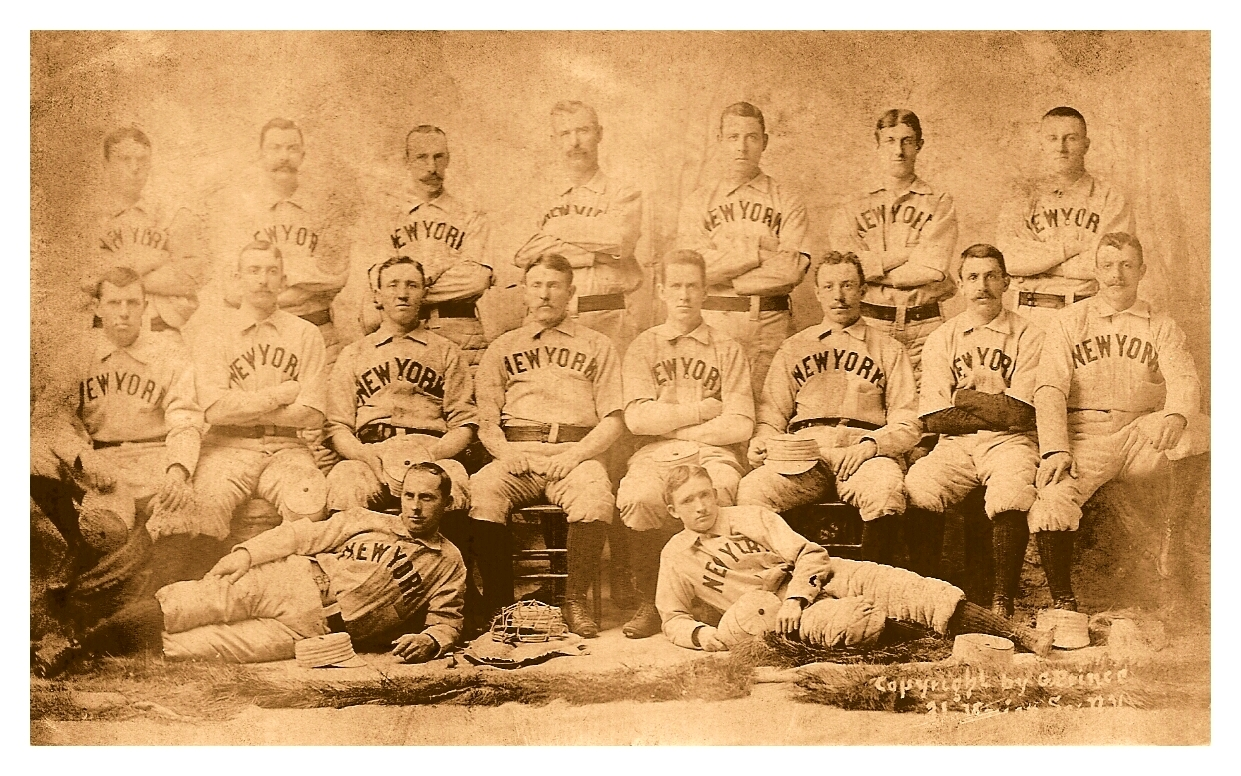
1894 New York Giants

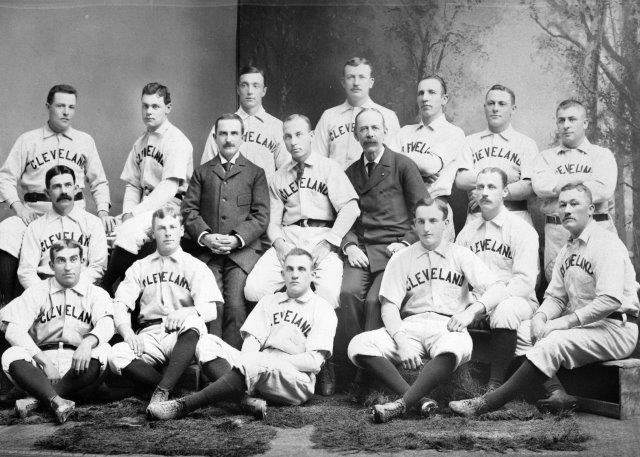
1895 Cleveland Spiders

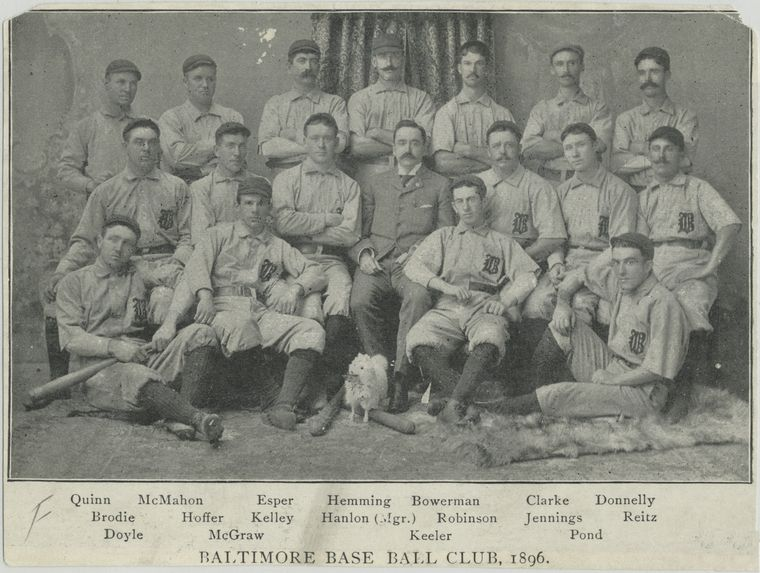
1896 Baltimore Orioles

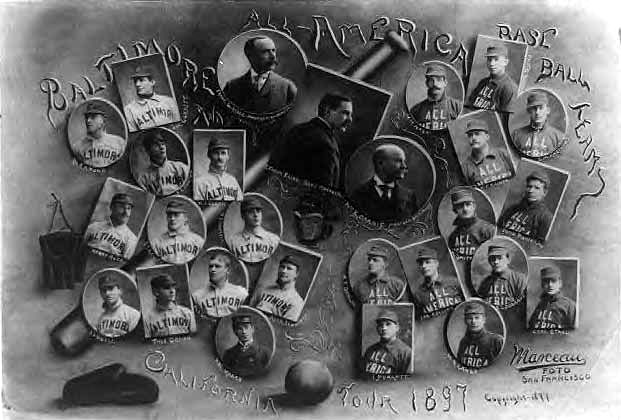
1897 Baltimore Orioles

== See also ==
- List of pre-World Series baseball champions
