= Baltimore Orioles (1882–1899) =

1882–1899 baseball team in Baltimore, Maryland, United States

- Baltimore Base Ball and Exhibition Company
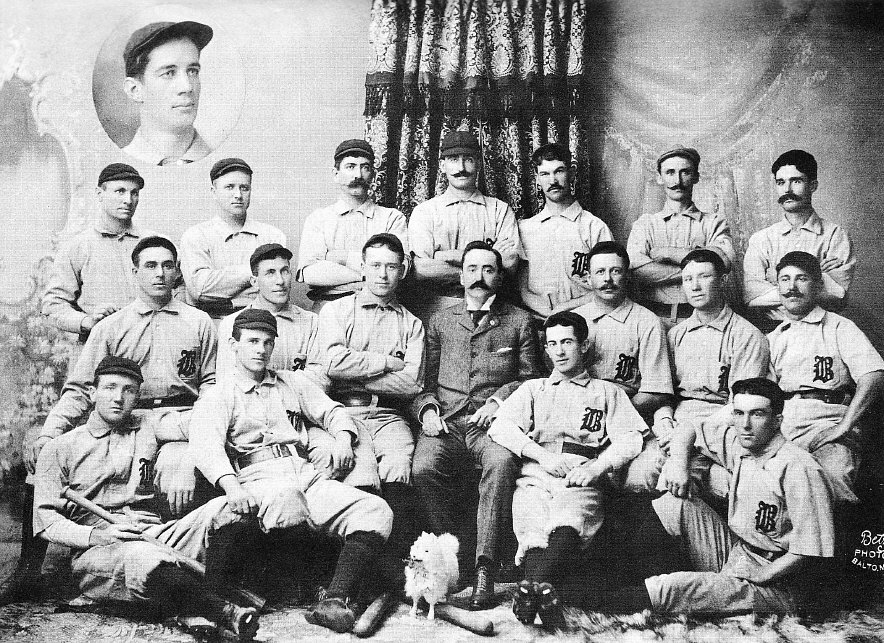
- Logo

Information
- League: National League (1892–1899)
- Location: Baltimore, Maryland
- Ballpark: Union Park (1891–1899)
- Founded: 1882
- Folded: 1899
- Temple Cup championships: 2: 1896; 1897
- National League pennant: 3: 1894; 1895; 1896
- Former league: American Association (1882–1891)
- Former ballparks: Oriole Park (1883–1890); Newington Park (1882)
- Colors: Gold, black, white
- Ownership: Harry Von der Horst
- Manager: John McGraw (1899); Ned Hanlon (1892–1898); John Waltz (1892); George Van Haltren (1892); Billy Barnie (1883–1891); Henry Myers (1882)

The Baltimore Orioles were a 19th-century professional baseball team that competed from 1882 to 1899, first in the American Association and later in the National League. This early Orioles franchise, which featured six players (Wilbert Robinson—C, Dan Brouthers—1B, Hughie Jennings—SS, John McGraw—3B, "Wee Willie" Keeler—RF, and Joe Kelley—LF) and a manager (Ned Hanlon) who were later inducted to the National Baseball Hall of Fame, finished in first place for three consecutive seasons (1894–1896) and won the Temple Cup national championship series in 1896 and 1897.

Despite their success, the dominant Orioles were contracted out of the National League after the 1899 season, when the league reduced in size from 12 members to eight. Most of the Orioles' best players moved to the Brooklyn Superbas—Baltimore owner Harry Von der Horst also had an ownership stake in Brooklyn.

Upon the foundation of the American League in 1901, a reorganized Baltimore Orioles franchise competed as a charter member for two seasons, before folding and being replaced by the New York Highlanders, later renamed the New York Yankees.

== History ==
=== American Association ===
The team, formally the "Baltimore Base Ball and Exhibition Company", was founded in 1882 as a charter member of the American Association (AA), considered a major league. The Orioles finished last in the league in four of their first five season, the exception being a sixth-place finish in 1884 when 13 different teams played in the league. The team then had its best positional finish, third place, in 1887, followed by two seasons finishing fifth in the then eight-team league.

The Orioles dropped out of the league after the 1889 season, and began the 1890 season playing in the minor-league Atlantic Association.

However, when the last-place Brooklyn Gladiators of the AA folded in late August, the Orioles re-joined the AA and played 38 games to complete the 1890 season, posting a record of 15–19 with four ties. The Orioles remained in the AA for 1891, finishing sixth among nine teams in the AA's final season.

Overall, during 10 seasons of AA play, the Orioles had a cumulative record of 489–602 (.448).

=== National League ===
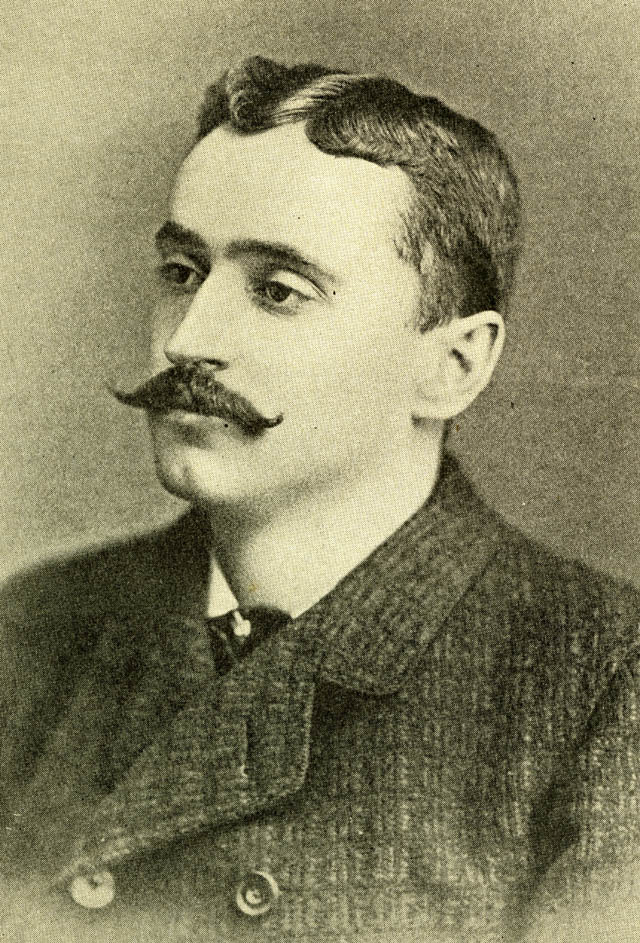
Ned Hanlon

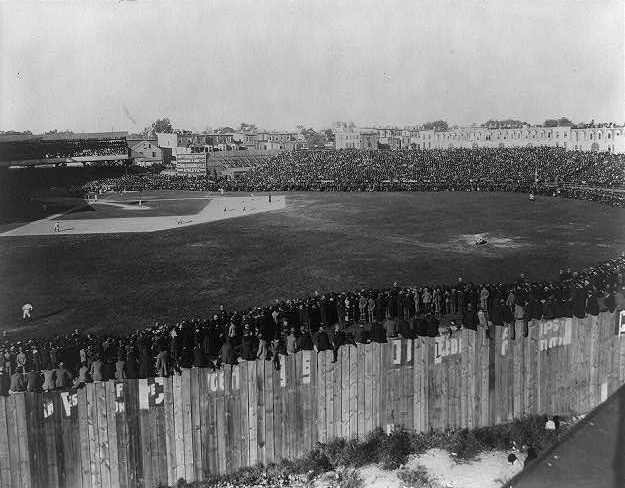
Boston Beaneaters versus Baltimore Orioles in 1897 at Oriole Park during a pennant race; Boston won

The Orioles were one of four AA clubs (the others being the Louisville Colonels, St. Louis Browns, and Washington Statesmen) merged into the National League (NL) in 1892, formally as a 12-member "League Association". The beginnings of the team can be traced to June 1892, when owner Harry Von der Horst hired Ned Hanlon to be manager of the Orioles, giving him stock in the team and full authority over baseball operations. Hanlon moved his growing family to a house that stood a block away from the team's ballpark.

After finishing last in the league in 1892 and eighth in 1893, the Orioles won three consecutive pennants during 1894–1896, featuring several future Hall of Famers under manager Hanlon. They followed up the title run with two second-place finishes, in 1897 and 1898. Accordingly, they participated in all four editions of the post-season Temple Cup series, held from 1894 through 1897 between the NL's top two teams, winning in 1896 and 1897.

After the team's 1898 second-place finish, most of the team's stars were moved to the Brooklyn Bridegrooms, who were renamed as the Superbas for 1899 and eventually became known as the Dodgers. The players moved when Von der Horst and Hanlon became part owners of the Brooklyn team, with Hanlon also becoming Brooklyn's manager. Third baseman John McGraw and catcher Wilbert Robinson remained in Baltimore, with McGraw remaining as first-year player-manager. Following a fourth-place finish in 1899, the Orioles were one of four clubs eliminated by the NL (the others being the Cleveland Spiders, Louisville Colonels, and the aforementioned Washington Statesmen, then known as the Washington Senators).

During their eight seasons of play in the NL, the Orioles compiled an overall record of 644–447 (.590).

=== Later developments ===
In the eight-team NL of 1900, McGraw and Robinson joined the St. Louis Cardinals.

In 1901, McGraw followed through on his threats to abandon the NL and form a club in the rival American League (AL), being formed by new president Ban Johnson out of the former minor-league Western League. These newly formed Orioles of the AL only stayed in Baltimore for two seasons.

In 1903, a team was established in New York City as "the price of peace" as agreement between the older circuit (the NL) and its new upstart rival (the AL) allowing the "Americans" to have a team based in the city as a sign of respectability. The AL team in New York became known as the New York Highlanders (or occasionally the New York Americans), later renamed in 1913 as the New York Yankees. The Yankees do not consider the 1901–1902 Baltimore team as part of their history.

In 1903, an Orioles franchise in the old minor-league Eastern League filled the void left by the departure of the major-league Orioles.

These minor-league Orioles included local product and future baseball icon Babe Ruth and Lefty Grove. The team won a string of seven straight titles, 1919–1925, at the then highest level of the minor leagues in the reorganized International League (known as such from 1912 onward).

A major-league franchise did not return to Baltimore until the St. Louis Browns (not the Browns of the AA, but a team that had its origins in Milwaukee) relocated to the city in 1954 and was renamed as the current Baltimore Orioles of Major League Baseball.

=== Ballparks ===
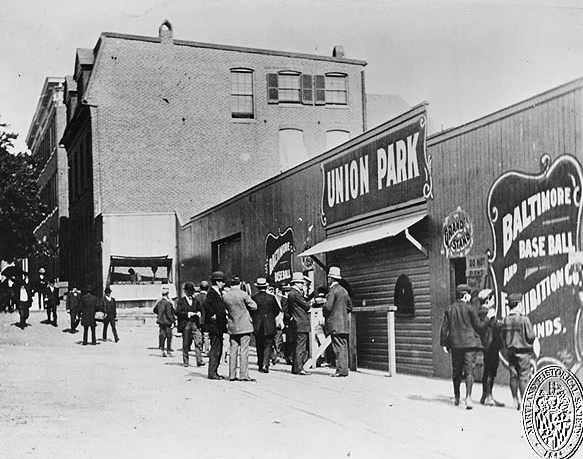
Union Park entrance

The Orioles of the American Association first played at Newington Park for the 1882 season.

Starting in 1883, the team played at the old Oriole Park, in Harwood, south of the Waverly neighborhood at 29th and Barclay Streets, just a block west from Greenmount Avenue, remaining there into the 1891 season. The 1901–1902 American League team played at Oriole Park a decade later.

During the 1891 season, the Orioles moved a few blocks away to Union Park on Huntington Avenue (later renamed 25th Street) and Greenmount Avenue. The team remained at Union Park for its entire time in the National League, 1892 through 1899.

== Stars ==
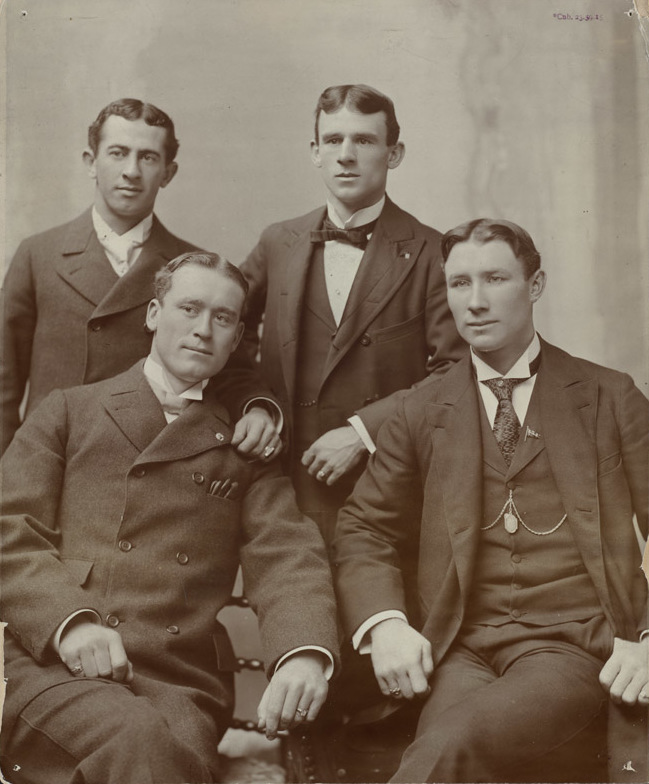
Back row: Willie Keeler (left) and John McGraw. Front row: Joe Kelley (left) and Hughie Jennings

The original Orioles were one of the most storied teams in the history of the game. Managed by Ned Hanlon, they won NL pennants in 1894, 1895, and 1896, and sported some of the most colorful players in history including John McGraw, Wee Willie Keeler, Hughie Jennings, Joe Kelley, Wilbert Robinson, and Dan Brouthers.

They were rough characters who practically invented "scientific" baseball, the form of baseball played before the home run became the norm in the 1920s. Like the style known today as "small ball", the "inside baseball" strategy of Orioles featured tight pitching, hit and run tactics, stolen bases, and precise bunting. One such play, where the batter deliberately strikes the pitched ball downward onto the infield surface with sufficient force such that the ball rebounds skyward, allowing the batter to reach first base safely before the opposing team can field the ball, remains known as a Baltimore chop.

Matt Kilroy pitched a no-hitter for the Orioles on October 6, 1886; Bill Hawke threw one on August 16, 1893, the first from the modern pitching distance of 60 feet, 6 inches; and Jay Hughes threw a no-hitter for the Orioles on April 22, 1898.

== Baseball Hall of Famers ==
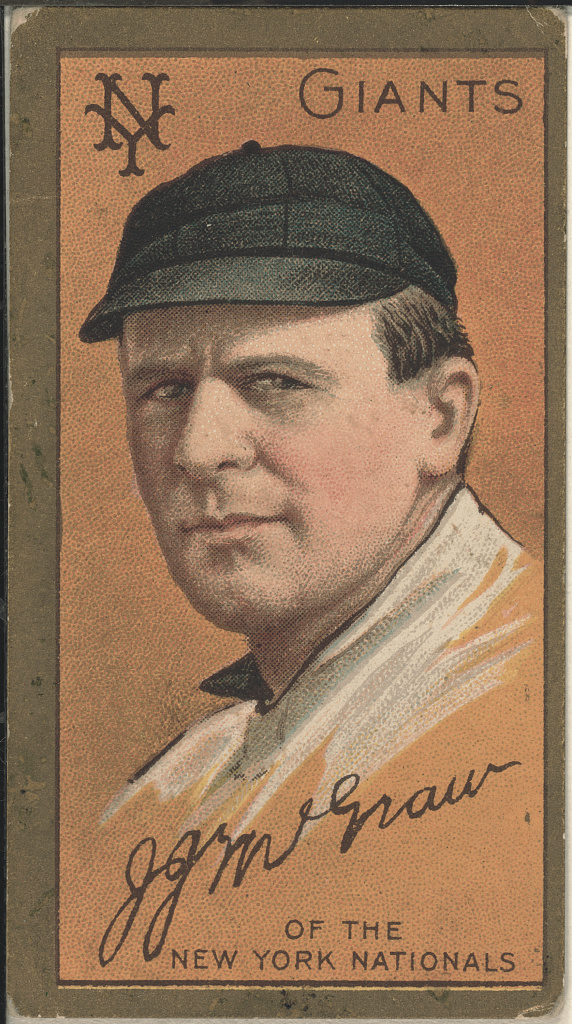
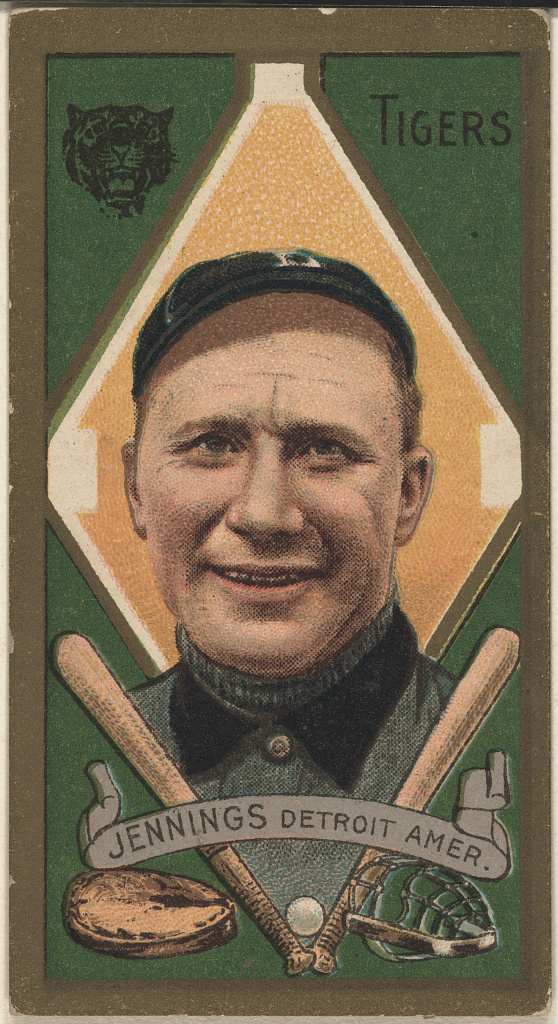
John McGraw (left) and Hughie Jennings (right) anchored the left side of the infield for Orioles teams that won three straight National League pennants (1894–1896). Later, both were successful managers.

Baltimore Orioles Hall of Famers
Inductee	Position	Tenure	Inducted
Dan Brouthers	1B	1894–1895	1945
Ned Hanlon	CF / Manager	1892–1898	1996
Hughie Jennings	SS/1B	1893–1899	1945
Willie Keeler	RF	1894–1898	1939
Joe Kelley	LF	1892–1898	1971
Joe McGinnity	P	1899	1946
John McGraw	3B / Manager	1891–1899	1937
Wilbert Robinson	Catcher / Manager	1890–1899	1945

== See also ==
- History of the Baltimore Orioles
- History of the New York Yankees

== Sources ==
- Solomon, Burt (1999), Where They Ain't: The Fabled Life And Untimely Death Of The Original Baltimore Orioles. New York: Free Press. ISBN 0-684-85451-1
- Rosenberg, Howard W. (2005); Cap Anson 3: Muggsy John McGraw and the Tricksters: Baseball's Fun Age of Rule Bending. Arlington, Virginia: Tile Books. ISBN 0-9725574-2-3
