= 1892 Cincinnati Reds season =

1892 Cincinnati Reds
- League: National League
- Ballpark: League Park
- City: Cincinnati
- Record: 1st half: 44–31 (.587); 2nd half: 38–37 (.507); Overall: 82–68 (.547)
- League place: 1st half: 4th (8 1/2 GB); 2nd half: 8th (14 1/2 GB)
- Owner: John T. Brush
- Manager: Charlie Comiskey

The 1892 Cincinnati Reds season was a season in American baseball. The National League expanded to 12 teams in 1892, and it was announced that the season would be split into two halves, with the winners of each half meeting in a "World's Championship Series". The Reds finished with a combined record of 82–68, fifth-best in the National League, finishing in fourth place in the first half and in eighth place in the second half.

== Regular season ==
After a horrible 1891 season in which the Reds finished in a virtual tie for last place with a 56–81 record, the team fired manager Tom Loftus and replaced him with first baseman Charles Comiskey. Comiskey had previously been the player-manager of the St. Louis Browns of the American Association from 1883 to 1889, leading the team to four straight pennants from 1885 to 1888. He then was a player-manager with the Chicago Pirates of the Players' League in 1890, leading them to a fourth-place finish, followed by a return to the Browns in 1891, where he led them to a second-place finish with a record of 86–52.

The Reds acquired outfielder Tip O'Neill during the off-season, as he spent the 1891 season with Comiskey with the Browns, hitting .323 with ten homers and 95 RBI for the club. O'Neill's best season was in 1887 with the Browns, when he hit .435, with 225 hits, 167 runs, 52 doubles, nineteen triples, fourteen home runs and 123 RBI, all of which led the American Association. Catcher Morgan Murphy was picked from the Boston Reds of the AA. Murphy hit .216 with four homers and 54 RBI in 106 games. Another catcher, Farmer Vaughn, was signed after he split the 1891 season between the Cincinnati Kelly's Killers and Milwaukee Brewers of the AA. Vaughn hit .285 with a homer and 23 RBI between the two clubs. Pitcher Ice Box Chamberlain also signed with the Reds after posting a 22–23 record with a 4.22 with the Philadelphia Athletics of the AA.

Bug Holliday once again was the Reds offensive leader, hitting .294 with a team high thirteen home runs and 91 RBI. Bid McPhee hit .274 with four homers and 60 RBI and 44 stolen bases, while Germany Smith hit .243 with eight homers and 63 RBI. On the mound, Tony Mullane led the staff with a 21–13 record and a 2.59 ERA, while Chamberlain had a 19–23 record with a 3.39 ERA in a team high 49 starts.

=== Season summary ===
In the first half of the season, the Reds started off strong and found themselves in the middle of the pennant race, sitting with a 26–16 record and in third place in the league, 4.5 games out of first, before they tallied off, finishing in fourth place with a 44–31 record, 8½ games behind the Boston Beaneaters. In the second half, the Reds were mediocre, as they finished in eighth place with a 38–37 record, 14½ games behind the Cleveland Spiders. They finished the season with a combined record of 82–68, which marked a big improvement over the previous year.

=== Season standings ===
National League
Team	W	L	Pct.	GB	Home	Road
Boston Beaneaters	102	48	.680	—	54‍–‍21	48‍–‍27
Cleveland Spiders	93	56	.624	8½	54‍–‍24	39‍–‍32
Brooklyn Grooms	95	59	.617	9	51‍–‍24	44‍–‍35
Philadelphia Phillies	87	66	.569	16½	55‍–‍26	32‍–‍40
Cincinnati Reds	82	68	.547	20	45‍–‍32	37‍–‍36
Pittsburgh Pirates	80	73	.523	23½	54‍–‍34	26‍–‍39
Chicago Colts	70	76	.479	30	36‍–‍31	34‍–‍45
New York Giants	71	80	.470	31½	42‍–‍36	29‍–‍44
Louisville Colonels	63	89	.414	40	37‍–‍31	26‍–‍58
Washington Senators	58	93	.384	44½	34‍–‍36	24‍–‍57
St. Louis Browns	56	94	.373	46	37‍–‍36	19‍–‍58
Baltimore Orioles	46	101	.313	54½	29‍–‍44	17‍–‍57

National League First-half standings	W	L	Pct.	GB
Boston Beaneaters	52	22	.703	—
Brooklyn Grooms	51	26	.662	2½
Philadelphia Phillies	46	30	.605	7
Cincinnati Reds	44	31	.587	8½
Cleveland Spiders	40	33	.548	11½
Pittsburgh Pirates	37	39	.487	16
Washington Senators	35	41	.461	18
Chicago Colts	31	39	.443	19
St. Louis Browns	31	42	.425	20½
New York Giants	31	43	.419	21
Louisville Colonels	30	47	.390	23½
Baltimore Orioles	20	55	.267	32½

National League Second-half standings	W	L	Pct.	GB
Cleveland Spiders	53	23	.697	—
Boston Beaneaters	50	26	.658	3
Brooklyn Grooms	44	33	.571	9½
Pittsburgh Pirates	43	34	.558	10½
Philadelphia Phillies	41	36	.532	12½
New York Giants	40	37	.519	13½
Chicago Colts	39	37	.513	14
Cincinnati Reds	38	37	.507	14½
Louisville Colonels	33	42	.440	19½
Baltimore Orioles	26	46	.361	25
St. Louis Browns	25	52	.325	28½
Washington Senators	23	52	.307	29½

=== Record vs. opponents ===
1892 National League record Sources:
Team	BAL	BSN	BRO	CHI	CIN	CLE	LOU	NYG	PHI	PIT	STL	WAS
Baltimore	—	0–13	2–12–1	4–7	4–10	2–11–2	6–7	5–9	4–10	5–9	8–6–1	6–7–1
Boston	13–0	—	9–5	10–4	8–5–1	8–6	12–2	11–3–1	6–7	7–6	7–7	11–3
Brooklyn	12–2–1	5–9	—	10–4	6–8	8–6	9–5	7–7	9–5–2	10–4	9–5–1	10–4
Chicago	7–4	4–10	4–10	—	6–7–1	3–9	5–9	10–4	5–9	7–7	7–5	12–2
Cincinnati	10–4	5–8–1	8–6	7–6–1	—	5–9	7–6–1	8–6	5–9	5–9	12–2–1	10–3–1
Cleveland	11–2–2	6–8	6–8	9–3	9–5	—	13–1	8–5	10–4	7–7–1	8–5–1	6–8
Louisville	7–6	2–12	5–9	9–5	6–7–1	1–13	—	4–10	4–10	8–6	9–5–1	8–6
New York	9–5	3–11–1	7–7	4–10	6–8	5–8	10–4	—	5–9	4–10–1	9–4	9–4
Philadelphia	10–4	7–6	5–9–2	9–5	9–5	4–10	10–4	9–5	—	8–6	7–7	9–5
Pittsburgh	9–5	6–7	4–10	7–7	9–5	7–7–1	6–8	10–4–1	6–8	—	10–4	6–8
St. Louis	6–8–1	7–7	5–9–1	5–7	2–12–1	5–8–1	5–9–1	4–9	7–7	4–10	—	6–8
Washington	7–6–1	3–11	4–10	2–12	3–10–1	8–6	6–8	4–9	5–9	8–6	8–6	—

=== Game log ===
Legend
Reds Win	Reds Loss	Game Tied/Postponed

1892 1st Half Game Log: 44–31 (Home: 23–16; Away: 21–15)
April: 9–6 (Home: 7–4; Away: 2–2)

#	Date	Opponent	Score	Stadium	Attendance	Record	Streak
1	April 12	Pirates	5–7	League Park	7,000	0-1	L1
2	April 13	Pirates	7–8	League Park	2,800	0-2	L2
-	April 14	Pirates	Postponed (rain; site change); Makeup: May 20				
3	April 15	Spiders	0–2	League Park	2,487	0-3	L3
4	April 16	Spiders	6–3	League Park	3,266	1-3	W1
5	April 17	@ Browns	5–1	Sportsman's Park	13,500	2-3	W2
-	April 18	Colts	Postponed (rain); Makeup: April 19				
6	April 19 1	Colts	5–2	League Park	N/A	3-3	W3
7	April 19 1	Colts	3–0	League Park	5,024	4-3	W4
8	April 21	@ Spiders	1–11	League Park	4,500	4-4	L1
9	April 22	@ Spiders	6–3	League Park	1,800	5-4	W1
10	April 23	@ Spiders	5–14	League Park	3,300	5-5	L1
11	April 24	Browns	10–2	League Park	16,000	6-5	W1
12	April 25	Browns	8–2	League Park	3,222	7-5	W2
13	April 26	Browns	10–6	League Park	2,939	8-5	W3
-	April 27	Browns	Postponed (unknown reason); Makeup: April 24				
14	April 29	Senators	1–4	League Park	3,066	8-6	L1
15	April 30	Senators	7–2	League Park	3,875	9-6	W1

May: 12–10 (Home: 3–5; Away: 9–5)

#	Date	Opponent	Score	Stadium	Attendance	Record	Streak
16	May 1	Spiders	12–9	League Park	13,256	10-6	W2
-	May 2	Giants	Postponed (wet grounds); Makeup: July 9				
-	May 3	Giants	Postponed (rain); Makeup: July 11				
17	May 4	Grooms	2–4	League Park	4,500	10-7	L1
18	May 5	Grooms	4–6	League Park	2,015	10-8	L2
19	May 6	Beaneaters	0–0	League Park	1,923	10-8	L2
20	May 7	Beaneaters	2–3	League Park	5,346	10-9	L3
21	May 8	Orioles	4–5	League Park	5,637	10-10	L4
-	May 9	Orioles	Postponed (rain); Makeup: May 8				
-	May 10	Orioles	Postponed (rain); Makeup: July 8				
-	May 11	Phillies	Postponed (rain); Makeup: May 12				
22	May 12 1	Phillies	4–5	League Park	N/A	10-11	L5
23	May 12 1	Phillies	2–1	League Park	1,816	11-11	W1
24	May 13	Colonels	7–5	League Park	1,705	12-11	W2
-	May 14	Colonels	Postponed (rain); Makeup: June 26				
25	May 15	@ Browns	5–4	Sportsman's Park	5,643	13-11	W3
26	May 16	@ Browns	5–4	Sportsman's Park	3,200	14-11	W4
27	May 18	@ Pirates	5–4	Exposition Park	1,280	15-11	W5
28	May 19	@ Pirates	1–3	Exposition Park	1,265	15-12	L1
29	May 20	@ Pirates	7–10	Exposition Park	1,147	15-13	L2
-	May 21	@ Colonels	Postponed (rain); Makeup: May 23				
30	May 22	@ Colonels	4–0	Eclipse Park	7,000	16-13	W1
31	May 23 1	@ Colonels	2–1	Eclipse Park	N/A	17-13	W2
32	May 23 2	@ Colonels	3–7	Eclipse Park	2,176	17-14	L1
-	May 24	@ Colonels	Postponed (rain); Makeup: May 23				
33	May 26	@ Phillies	4–3	Philadelphia Base Ball Grounds	2,361	18-14	W1
34	May 27	@ Phillies	8–6	Philadelphia Base Ball Grounds	600	19-14	W2
35	May 28	@ Phillies	1–2	Philadelphia Base Ball Grounds	2,200	19-15	L1
36	May 30 1	@ Grooms	5–4	Eastern Park	3,400	20-15	W1
37	May 30 2	@ Grooms	6–2	Eastern Park	11,368	21-15	W2
38	May 31	@ Grooms	1–7	Eastern Park	1,567	21-16	L1

June: 13–10 (Home: 3–2; Away: 10–8)

#	Date	Opponent	Score	Stadium	Attendance	Record	Streak
39	June 1	@ Orioles	6–4	Union Park	1,382	22-16	W1
40	June 2	@ Orioles	3–2	Union Park	937	23-16	W2
41	June 3	@ Orioles	5–2	Union Park	740	24-16	W3
42	June 4	@ Senators	7–5	Boundary Field	1,968	25-16	W4
43	June 6	@ Senators	7–4	Boundary Field	1,697	26-16	W5
44	June 7	@ Senators	2–20	Boundary Field	1,356	26-17	L1
-	June 8	@ Giants	Postponed (rain); Makeup: June 10				
45	June 9	@ Giants	5–9	Polo Grounds	1,037	26-18	L2
46	June 10 1	@ Giants	7–3	Polo Grounds	N/A	27-18	W1
47	June 10 2	@ Giants	1–2	Polo Grounds	1,672	27-19	L1
48	June 11	@ Beaneaters	4–6	South End Grounds	5,131	27-20	L2
49	June 13	@ Beaneaters	7–5	South End Grounds	1,589	28-20	W1
50	June 14	@ Beaneaters	6–11	South End Grounds	1,007	28-21	L1
-	June 16	@ Browns	Postponed (unknown reason); Makeup: April 17				
51	June 17	@ Browns	5–7	Sportsman's Park	1,700	28-22	L2
52	June 18	@ Colts	3–0	South Side Park	3,000	29-22	W1
53	June 20	@ Colts	7–4	South Side Park	1,800	30-22	W2
54	June 21	@ Colts	2–1	South Side Park	2,000	31-22	W3
55	June 22	Spiders	3–9	League Park	2,534	31-23	L1
-	June 23	Spideres	Postponed (unknown reason); Makeup: May 1				
56	June 24	@ Pirates	0–2	Exposition Park	1,285	31-24	L2
57	June 25	@ Pirates	3–7	Exposition Park	2,835	31-25	L3
58	June 26	Colonels	7–3	League Park	5,297	32-25	W1
59	June 27	Colonels	4–5	League Park	1,721	32-26	L1
60	June 28	Colonels	4–1	League Park	2,000	33-26	W1
61	June 29	Colts	6–1	League Park	2,732	34-26	W2
62	June 30	Colts	7–7	League Park	1,257	34-26	W2

July: 10–5 (Home: 10–5; Away: 0–0)

#	Date	Opponent	Score	Stadium	Attendance	Record	Streak
-	July 1	Senators	Postponed (schedule change); Makeup: July 3				
63	July 2	Senators	7–5	League Park	1,760	35-26	W3
64	July 3	Senators	3–0	League Park	3,927	36-26	W4
65	July 4 1	Beaneaters	9–5	League Park	7,200	37-26	W5
66	July 4 2	Beaneaters	6–7	League Park	8,884	37-27	L1
67	July 5	Phillies	3–7	League Park	2,248	37-28	L2
68	July 6	Phillies	5–11	League Park	1,435	37-29	L3
69	July 7	Orioles	21–2	League Park	928	38-29	W1
70	July 8 1	Orioles	2–4	League Park	N/A	38-30	L1
71	July 8 2	Orioles	12–5	League Park	1,800	39-30	W1
72	July 9 1	Giants	10–1	League Park	N/A	40-30	W2
73	July 9 2	Giants	10–4	League Park	3,849	41-30	W3
74	July 11 1	Giants	12–8	League Park	N/A	42-30	W4
75	July 11 2	Giants	4–2	League Park	2,293	43-30	W5
76	July 12	Grooms	2–4	League Park	1,463	43-31	L1
77	July 13	Grooms	3–1	League Park	1,252	44-31	W1

Legend
Reds Win	Reds Loss	Game Tied/Postponed

1892 2nd Half Game Log: 38–37 (Home: 22–15; Away: 16–22)
August: 8–6 (Home: 2–0; Away: 6–6)

#	Date	Opponent	Score	Stadium	Attendance	Record	Streak
1	July 15	@ Orioles	2–5	Union Park	1,596	0-1	L1
2	July 16	@ Orioles	16–5	Union Park	2,504	1-1	W1
3	July 18	@ Giants	5–2	Polo Grounds	2,086	2-1	W2
4	July 19	@ Giants	3–1	Polo Grounds	1,200	3-1	W3
5	July 20	@ Senators	3–2	Boundary Field	1,125	4-1	W4
6	July 21	@ Senators	6–2	Boundary Field	2,119	5-1	W5
7	July 22	@ Grooms	3–6	Eastern Park	2,154	5-2	L1
8	July 23	@ Grooms	2–3	Eastern Park	5,524	5-3	L2
9	July 25	@ Phillies	0–6	Philadelphia Base Ball Grounds	3,018	5-4	L3
10	July 26	@ Phillies	6–26	Philadelphia Base Ball Grounds	2,796	5-5	L4
11	July 27	@ Beaneaters	4–5	South End Grounds	1,188	5-6	L5
12	July 28	@ Beaneaters	3–2	South End Grounds	1,388	6-6	W1
-	July 29	Browns	Postponed (rain); Makeup: July 31				
13	July 30	Browns	8–6	League Park	1,234	7-6	W2
14	July 31	Browns	6–0	League Park	3,580	8-6	W3

August: 12–14 (Home: 10–7; Away: 2–7)

#	Date	Opponent	Score	Stadium	Attendance	Record	Streak
15	August 1	@ Colonels	1–6	Eclipse Park	1,003	8-7	L1
16	August 2	@ Colonels	4–11	Eclipse Park	1,300	8-8	L2
17	August 3	Pirates	3–5	League Park	1,120	8-9	L3
18	August 4	Pirates	12–5	League Park	1,110	9-9	W1
19	August 6	@ Colts	1–6	South Side Park	3,000	9-10	L1
20	August 8	@ Colts	8–12	South Side Park	1,000	9-11	L2
21	August 9	@ Spiders	5–8	League Park	2,200	9-12	L3
22	August 10	@ Spiders	6–5	League Park	1,785	10-12	W1
23	August 11	@ Pirates	1–4	Exposition Park	1,107	10-13	L1
24	August 12	@ Pirates	1–4	Exposition Park	1,327	10-14	L2
25	August 13	@ Pirates	7–3	Exposition Park	2,380	11-14	W1
26	August 15	Giants	2–9	League Park	1,845	11-15	L1
27	August 16	Giants	6–8	League Park	1,000	11-16	L2
28	August 17	Giants	7–13	League Park	628	11-17	L3
29	August 18	Phillies	0–7	League Park	557	11-18	L4
30	August 19	Phillies	4–3	League Park	379	12-18	W1
31	August 20	Phillies	3–0	League Park	1,483	13-18	W2
32	August 22	Senators	6–5	League Park	1,811	14-18	W3
33	August 23	Senators	9–9	League Park	937	14-18	W3
34	August 24 1	Senators	7–2	League Park	N/A	15-18	W4
35	August 24 2	Senators	4–2	League Park	1,980	16-18	W5
36	August 25	Orioles	3–1	League Park	699	17-18	W6
-	August 26	Orioles	Postponed (unknown reason); Makeup: August 28				
37	August 27	Orioles	6–5	League Park	2,302	18-18	W7
38	August 28	Orioles	8–2	League Park	5,952	19-18	W8
39	August 29	Beaneaters	2–5	League Park	2,103	19-19	L1
40	August 30	Beaneaters	6–1	League Park	1,579	20-19	W1
41	August 31	Beaneaters	1–5	League Park	2,230	20-20	L1

September: 11–13 (Home: 4–7; Away: 7–6)

#	Date	Opponent	Score	Stadium	Attendance	Record	Streak
42	September 1	Grooms	10–7	League Park	922	21-20	W1
43	September 2	Grooms	8–5	League Park	1,792	22-20	W2
44	September 3	Grooms	8–1	League Park	2,832	23-20	W3
45	September 4	Orioles	1–6	League Park	4,498	23-21	L1
-	September 5	@ Orioles	Postponed (unknown reason; site change); Makeup: September 4				
46	September 5	@ Orioles	7–5	Union Park	1,102	24-21	W1
47	September 7	@ Phillies	3–4	Philadelphia Base Ball Grounds	1,134	24-22	L1
48	September 8	@ Phillies	6–7	Philadelphia Base Ball Grounds	1,200	24-23	L2
49	September 9	@ Giants	4–5	Polo Grounds	887	24-24	L3
50	September 10	@ Giants	9–0	Polo Grounds	1,732	25-24	W1
51	September 12	@ Senators	4–5	Boundary Field	716	25-25	L1
52	September 14	@ Grooms	6–2	Eastern Park	553	26-25	W1
53	September 15	@ Grooms	7–4	Eastern Park	1,339	27-25	W2
54	September 16	@ Beaneaters	2–1	South End Grounds	1,464	28-25	W3
55	September 17	@ Beaneaters	4–7	South End Grounds	2,341	28-26	L1
-	September 19	Colonels	Postponed (train wreck); Makeup: October 7				
56	September 20	Colonels	7–6	League Park	1,492	29-26	W1
57	September 21	Colonels	1–3	League Park	719	29-27	L1
58	September 22	@ Browns	2–6	Sportsman's Park	400	29-28	L2
59	September 24	@ Browns	3–3	Sportsman's Park	2,100	29-28	L2
60	September 25 1	@ Browns	5–2	Sportsman's Park	N/A	30-28	W1
61	September 25 2	@ Browns	8–6	Sportsman's Park	7,500	31-28	W2
62	September 26	Spiders	2–3	League Park	1,613	31-29	L1
63	September 27	Spiders	2–3	League Park	1,500	31-30	L2
64	September 28	Spiders	5–9	League Park	1,202	31-31	L3
65	September 29	Colts	4–10	League Park	857	31-32	L4
66	September 30	Colts	1–5	League Park	828	31-33	L5

October: 7–4 (Home: 6–1; Away: 1–3)

#	Date	Opponent	Score	Stadium	Attendance	Record	Streak
67	October 1	Colts	7–2	League Park	834	32-33	W1
68	October 2 1	Browns	12–10	League Park	N/a	33-33	W2
69	October 2 2	Browns	4–1	League Park	4,518	34-33	W3
-	October 3	Browns	Postponed (rain); Makeup: October 2				
-	October 4	Browns	Postponed (unknown reason); Makeup: October 2				
70	October 5	@ Spiders	0–6	League Park	100	34-34	L1
71	October 6	@ Spiders	6–5	League Park	600	35-34	W1
72	October 7	Colonels	4–3	League Park	637	36-34	W2
-	October 8	@ Colonels	Postponed (unknown reason); Makeup: October 9				
73	October 9 1	@ Colonels	5–9	Eclipse Park	N/A	36-35	L1
74	October 9 2	@ Colonels	3–3	Eclipse Park	N/A	36-35	L1
-	October 10	@ Colts	Postponed (site change); Makeup: October 10				
75	October 10	Colts	3–4	League Park	801	36-36	L2
-	October 11	@ Colts	Postponed (site change); Makeup: October 11				
76	October 11	Colts	4–5	League Park	531	36-37	L3
77	October 13	Pirates	8–6	League Park	321	37-37	W1
78	October 15	Pirates	7–1	League Park	604	38-37	W2

=== Roster ===
1892 Cincinnati Reds
Roster
Pitchers: Ice Box Chamberlain; Dan Daub; Jesse Duryea; Frank Dwyer; George Hemming; Bumpus Jones; Frank Knauss; Willie McGill; George Meakim; Tony Mullane; George Rettger; Billy Rhines; Ben Stephens; Mike Sullivan	Catchers: Tom Dowse; Jerry Harrington; Dan Mahoney; Morgan Murphy; Farmer Vaughn; Infielders: Charlie Comiskey; Frank Genins; Bill Kuehne; Arlie Latham; Bid McPhee; Germany Smith	Outfielders: Pete Browning; Eddie Burke; Jocko Halligan; Bug Holliday; Buster Hoover; Tip O'Neill; Curt Welch; George Wood	Manager: Charlie Comiskey

== Player stats ==
=== Batting ===
==== Starters by position ====
Note: Pos = Position; G = Games played; AB = At bats; H = Hits; Avg. = Batting average; HR = Home runs; RBI = Runs batted in

Pos	Player	G	AB	H	Avg.	HR	RBI
C	Morgan Murphy	74	234	46	.197	2	24
1B	Charlie Comiskey	141	551	125	.227	3	71
2B	Bid McPhee	144	573	157	.274	4	60
SS	Germany Smith	139	506	123	.243	8	63
3B	Arlie Latham	152	622	148	.238	0	44
OF	Bug Holliday	152	602	177	.294	13	91
OF	Tip O'Neill	109	419	105	.251	2	52
OF	Pete Browning	83	307	93	.303	3	52

==== Other batters ====
Note: G = Games played; AB = At bats; H = Hits; Avg. = Batting average; HR = Home runs; RBI = Runs batted in

Player	G	AB	H	Avg.	HR	RBI
Farmer Vaughn	91	346	88	.254	2	50
Frank Genins	35	110	20	.182	0	7
George Wood	30	107	21	.196	0	14
Jocko Halligan	26	101	29	.287	2	12
Curt Welch	25	94	19	.202	1	7
Jerry Harrington	22	61	13	.213	0	3
Buster Hoover	14	51	9	.176	0	2
Eddie Burke	15	41	6	.146	0	4
Bill Kuehne	6	24	5	.208	1	4
Dan Mahoney	5	21	4	.190	0	1
Tom Dowse	1	4	0	.000	0	0

=== Pitching ===
==== Starting pitchers ====
Note: G = Games pitched; IP = Innings pitched; W = Wins; L = Losses; ERA = Earned run average; SO = Strikeouts

Player	G	IP	W	L	ERA	SO
Ice Box Chamberlain	52	406.1	19	23	3.39	169
Tony Mullane	37	295.0	21	13	2.59	109
Frank Dwyer	34	268.1	20	10	2.31	47
Mike Sullivan	21	166.1	12	4	3.08	56
Billy Rhines	11	74.2	3	7	5.42	10
Jesse Duryea	9	68.0	2	5	3.57	21
Dan Daub	4	25.0	1	2	2.88	7
Willie McGill	3	17.0	1	1	5.29	7
George Meakim	3	13.2	1	1	8.56	4
George Rettger	1	9.0	1	0	4.00	1
Bumpus Jones	1	9.0	1	0	0.00	3
Ben Stephens	1	7.0	0	1	1.29	1

==== Relief pitchers ====
Note: G = Games pitched; W = Wins; L = Losses; SV = Saves; ERA = Earned run average; SO = Strikeouts

Player	G	W	L	SV	ERA	SO
Frank Knauss	1	0	0	0	3.38	2
George Hemming	1	0	1	0	7.50	0
Bug Holliday	1	0	0	0	11.25	0
