= 1892 Louisville Colonels season =

1892 Louisville Colonels
- League: National League
- Ballpark: Eclipse Park
- City: Louisville, Kentucky
- Record: 1st half: 30–47 (.390); 2nd half: 33–42 (.440); Overall: 63–89 (.414)
- League place: 1st half: 11th (23 1/2 GB); 2nd half: 9th (19 1/2 GB)
- Owner: Barney Dreyfuss
- Managers: Jack Chapman, Fred Pfeffer

The 1892 Louisville Colonels season saw the Colonels professional baseball team of Louisville, Kentucky, compete as members of the National League. In a split season schedule, the Colonels finished 11th in the first half of the season and ninth in the second half. Overall, the team had a record of 63–89, ninth-best in the 12-team National League.

== Regular season ==
=== Season standings ===
National League
Team	W	L	Pct.	GB	Home	Road
Boston Beaneaters	102	48	.680	—	54‍–‍21	48‍–‍27
Cleveland Spiders	93	56	.624	8½	54‍–‍24	39‍–‍32
Brooklyn Grooms	95	59	.617	9	51‍–‍24	44‍–‍35
Philadelphia Phillies	87	66	.569	16½	55‍–‍26	32‍–‍40
Cincinnati Reds	82	68	.547	20	45‍–‍32	37‍–‍36
Pittsburgh Pirates	80	73	.523	23½	54‍–‍34	26‍–‍39
Chicago Colts	70	76	.479	30	36‍–‍31	34‍–‍45
New York Giants	71	80	.470	31½	42‍–‍36	29‍–‍44
Louisville Colonels	63	89	.414	40	37‍–‍31	26‍–‍58
Washington Senators	58	93	.384	44½	34‍–‍36	24‍–‍57
St. Louis Browns	56	94	.373	46	37‍–‍36	19‍–‍58
Baltimore Orioles	46	101	.313	54½	29‍–‍44	17‍–‍57

National League First-half standings	W	L	Pct.	GB
Boston Beaneaters	52	22	.703	—
Brooklyn Grooms	51	26	.662	2½
Philadelphia Phillies	46	30	.605	7
Cincinnati Reds	44	31	.587	8½
Cleveland Spiders	40	33	.548	11½
Pittsburgh Pirates	37	39	.487	16
Washington Senators	35	41	.461	18
Chicago Colts	31	39	.443	19
St. Louis Browns	31	42	.425	20½
New York Giants	31	43	.419	21
Louisville Colonels	30	47	.390	23½
Baltimore Orioles	20	55	.267	32½

National League Second-half standings	W	L	Pct.	GB
Cleveland Spiders	53	23	.697	—
Boston Beaneaters	50	26	.658	3
Brooklyn Grooms	44	33	.571	9½
Pittsburgh Pirates	43	34	.558	10½
Philadelphia Phillies	41	36	.532	12½
New York Giants	40	37	.519	13½
Chicago Colts	39	37	.513	14
Cincinnati Reds	38	37	.507	14½
Louisville Colonels	33	42	.440	19½
Baltimore Orioles	26	46	.361	25
St. Louis Browns	25	52	.325	28½
Washington Senators	23	52	.307	29½

=== Record vs. opponents ===
1892 National League record Sources:
Team	BAL	BSN	BRO	CHI	CIN	CLE	LOU	NYG	PHI	PIT	STL	WAS
Baltimore	—	0–13	2–12–1	4–7	4–10	2–11–2	6–7	5–9	4–10	5–9	8–6–1	6–7–1
Boston	13–0	—	9–5	10–4	8–5–1	8–6	12–2	11–3–1	6–7	7–6	7–7	11–3
Brooklyn	12–2–1	5–9	—	10–4	6–8	8–6	9–5	7–7	9–5–2	10–4	9–5–1	10–4
Chicago	7–4	4–10	4–10	—	6–7–1	3–9	5–9	10–4	5–9	7–7	7–5	12–2
Cincinnati	10–4	5–8–1	8–6	7–6–1	—	5–9	7–6–1	8–6	5–9	5–9	12–2–1	10–3–1
Cleveland	11–2–2	6–8	6–8	9–3	9–5	—	13–1	8–5	10–4	7–7–1	8–5–1	6–8
Louisville	7–6	2–12	5–9	9–5	6–7–1	1–13	—	4–10	4–10	8–6	9–5–1	8–6
New York	9–5	3–11–1	7–7	4–10	6–8	5–8	10–4	—	5–9	4–10–1	9–4	9–4
Philadelphia	10–4	7–6	5–9–2	9–5	9–5	4–10	10–4	9–5	—	8–6	7–7	9–5
Pittsburgh	9–5	6–7	4–10	7–7	9–5	7–7–1	6–8	10–4–1	6–8	—	10–4	6–8
St. Louis	6–8–1	7–7	5–9–1	5–7	2–12–1	5–8–1	5–9–1	4–9	7–7	4–10	—	6–8
Washington	7–6–1	3–11	4–10	2–12	3–10–1	8–6	6–8	4–9	5–9	8–6	8–6	—

=== Roster ===
1892 Louisville Colonels
Roster
Pitchers: Fritz Clausen; Warren Fitzgerald; Egyptian Healy; George Hemming; Alex Jones; Jouett Meekin; Ben Sanders; Scott Stratton; Lee Viau	Catchers: Tom Dowse; John Grim; Bill Merritt; Infielders: Charley Bassett; Hughie Jennings; Bill Kuehne; Fred Pfeffer; Lew Whistler	Outfielders: Tom Brown; Pete Browning; Harry Dooms; Alex McFarlan; Emmett Seery; Harry Taylor; Farmer Weaver	Manager: Jack Chapman; Fred Pfeffer

== Player stats ==
=== Batting ===
==== Starters by position ====
Note: Pos = Position; G = Games played; AB = At bats; H = Hits; Avg. = Batting average; HR = Home runs; RBI = Runs batted in

Pos	Player	G	AB	H	Avg.	HR	RBI
C	John Grim	97	370	90	.243	1	36
1B	Lew Whistler	80	285	67	.235	5	34
2B	Fred Pfeffer	124	470	121	.257	2	76
SS	Hughie Jennings	152	594	133	.224	2	61
3B	Bill Kuehne	76	287	48	.167	0	36
OF	Harry Taylor	125	493	128	.260	0	34
OF	Farmer Weaver	138	551	140	.254	0	57
OF	Tom Brown	153	660	150	.227	2	45

==== Other batters ====
Note: G = Games played; AB = At bats; H = Hits; Avg. = Batting average; HR = Home runs; RBI = Runs batted in

Player	G	AB	H	Avg.	HR	RBI
Charley Bassett	79	313	67	.214	2	35
Bill Merritt	46	168	33	.196	1	13
Emmett Seery	42	154	31	.201	0	15
Tom Dowse	41	145	21	.145	0	7
Pete Browning	21	77	19	.247	0	4
Alex McFarlan	14	42	7	.167	0	1
Harry Dooms	1	4	0	.000	0	0

=== Pitching ===
==== Starting pitchers ====
Note: G = Games pitched; IP = Innings pitched; W = Wins; L = Losses; ERA = Earned run average; SO = Strikeouts

Player	G	IP	W	L	ERA	SO
Scott Stratton	42	351.2	21	19	2.92	93
Ben Sanders	31	268.2	12	19	3.22	77
Fritz Clausen	24	200.0	9	13	3.06	94
Jouett Meekin	19	156.1	7	10	4.03	67
Alex Jones	18	146.2	5	11	3.31	44
Lee Viau	16	130.2	4	11	3.99	36
George Hemming	4	35.0	2	2	4.63	12
Warren Fitzgerald	4	34.0	1	3	4.24	3
Egyptian Healy	2	18.1	1	1	1.96	4

==== Relief pitchers ====
Note: G = Games pitched; W = Wins; L = Losses; SV = Saves; ERA = Earned run average; SO = Strikeouts

Player	G	W	L	SV	ERA	SO
Fred Pfeffer	1	0	0	0	1.80	0
