= 1892 Philadelphia Phillies season =

National League season

1892 Philadelphia Phillies
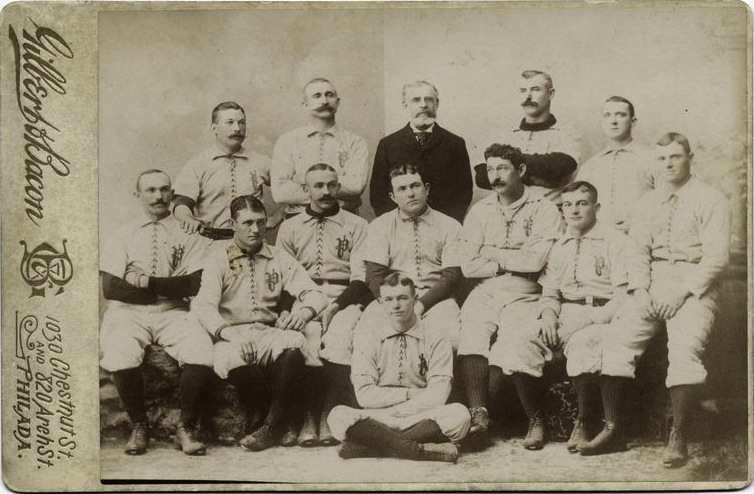
- 1892 Philadelphia Phillies; Pictured are Bob Allen, Charlie Reilly, Sam Thompson, Harry Wright, Roger Connor, Bill Hallman, Billy Hamilton, Ed Delahanty, Jack Clements, Tim Keefe, Lave Cross, Gus Weyhing, Kid Carsey.
- League: National League
- Ballpark: Philadelphia Base Ball Grounds
- City: Philadelphia
- Record: 1st half: 46–30 (.605); 2nd half: 41–36 (.532); Overall: 87–66 (.569)
- League place: 1st half: 3rd (7 GB); 2nd half: 5th (12 1/2 GB)
- Owners: Al Reach, John Rogers
- Manager: Harry Wright

The 1892 Philadelphia Phillies season was a season in American baseball. The team competed in the National League, which played a split season that year.

The Phillies finished in third place during the first half of the season, and in fifth place in the second half. Their overall record was 87–66, which was the fourth-best record in the National League.

== Offseason ==
=== Spring training ===
The Phillies held spring training in 1892 in Gainesville, Florida, the team's first spring in Florida. Twelve members of the team rode the train forty hours from Philadelphia's Broad Street Station to Gainesville.

The team practiced and played exhibition games at The Ballpark. The Phillies lost $469.69 on the trip.

The team subsequently returned to Gainesville for spring training in 1921.

== Regular season ==
=== Season standings ===
National League
Team	W	L	Pct.	GB	Home	Road
Boston Beaneaters	102	48	.680	—	54‍–‍21	48‍–‍27
Cleveland Spiders	93	56	.624	8½	54‍–‍24	39‍–‍32
Brooklyn Grooms	95	59	.617	9	51‍–‍24	44‍–‍35
Philadelphia Phillies	87	66	.569	16½	55‍–‍26	32‍–‍40
Cincinnati Reds	82	68	.547	20	45‍–‍32	37‍–‍36
Pittsburgh Pirates	80	73	.523	23½	54‍–‍34	26‍–‍39
Chicago Colts	70	76	.479	30	36‍–‍31	34‍–‍45
New York Giants	71	80	.470	31½	42‍–‍36	29‍–‍44
Louisville Colonels	63	89	.414	40	37‍–‍31	26‍–‍58
Washington Senators	58	93	.384	44½	34‍–‍36	24‍–‍57
St. Louis Browns	56	94	.373	46	37‍–‍36	19‍–‍58
Baltimore Orioles	46	101	.313	54½	29‍–‍44	17‍–‍57

National League First-half standings	W	L	Pct.	GB
Boston Beaneaters	52	22	.703	—
Brooklyn Grooms	51	26	.662	2 1/2
Philadelphia Phillies	46	30	.605	7
Cincinnati Reds	44	31	.587	8 1/2
Cleveland Spiders	40	33	.548	11 1/2
Pittsburgh Pirates	37	39	.487	16
Washington Senators	35	41	.461	18
Chicago Colts	31	39	.443	19
St. Louis Browns	31	42	.425	20 1/2
New York Giants	31	43	.419	21
Louisville Colonels	30	47	.390	23 1/2
Baltimore Orioles	20	55	.267	32 1/2

National League Second-half standings	W	L	Pct.	GB
Cleveland Spiders	53	23	.697	—
Boston Beaneaters	50	26	.658	3
Brooklyn Grooms	44	33	.571	9 1/2
Pittsburgh Pirates	43	34	.558	10 1/2
Philadelphia Phillies	41	36	.532	12 1/2
New York Giants	40	37	.519	13 1/2
Chicago Colts	39	37	.513	14
Cincinnati Reds	38	37	.507	14 1/2
Louisville Colonels	33	42	.440	19 1/2
Baltimore Orioles	26	46	.361	25
St. Louis Browns	25	52	.325	28 1/2
Washington Senators	23	52	.307	29 1/2

=== Record vs. opponents ===
1892 National League record Sources:
Team	BAL	BSN	BRO	CHI	CIN	CLE	LOU	NYG	PHI	PIT	STL	WAS
Baltimore	—	0–13	2–12–1	4–7	4–10	2–11–2	6–7	5–9	4–10	5–9	8–6–1	6–7–1
Boston	13–0	—	9–5	10–4	8–5–1	8–6	12–2	11–3–1	6–7	7–6	7–7	11–3
Brooklyn	12–2–1	5–9	—	10–4	6–8	8–6	9–5	7–7	9–5–2	10–4	9–5–1	10–4
Chicago	7–4	4–10	4–10	—	6–7–1	3–9	5–9	10–4	5–9	7–7	7–5	12–2
Cincinnati	10–4	5–8–1	8–6	7–6–1	—	5–9	7–6–1	8–6	5–9	5–9	12–2–1	10–3–1
Cleveland	11–2–2	6–8	6–8	9–3	9–5	—	13–1	8–5	10–4	7–7–1	8–5–1	6–8
Louisville	7–6	2–12	5–9	9–5	6–7–1	1–13	—	4–10	4–10	8–6	9–5–1	8–6
New York	9–5	3–11–1	7–7	4–10	6–8	5–8	10–4	—	5–9	4–10–1	9–4	9–4
Philadelphia	10–4	7–6	5–9–2	9–5	9–5	4–10	10–4	9–5	—	8–6	7–7	9–5
Pittsburgh	9–5	6–7	4–10	7–7	9–5	7–7–1	6–8	10–4–1	6–8	—	10–4	6–8
St. Louis	6–8–1	7–7	5–9–1	5–7	2–12–1	5–8–1	5–9–1	4–9	7–7	4–10	—	6–8
Washington	7–6–1	3–11	4–10	2–12	3–10–1	8–6	6–8	4–9	5–9	8–6	8–6	—

=== Roster ===
1892 Philadelphia Phillies
Roster
Pitchers: Kid Carsey; Duke Esper; Tim Keefe; Phil Knell; Jack Taylor; John Thornton; Gus Weyhing	Catchers: Jack Clements; Tom Dowse; Infielders: Bob Allen; Roger Connor; Lave Cross; Bill Hallman; Harry Morelock; Joe Mulvey; Charlie Reilly	Outfielders: Jerry Connors; Ed Delahanty; Billy Hamilton; Dummy Stephenson; Sam Thompson	Manager: Harry Wright

== Player stats ==
=== Batting ===
==== Starters by position ====
Note: Pos = Position; G = Games played; AB = At bats; H = Hits; Avg. = Batting average; HR = Home runs; RBI = Runs batted in

Pos	Player	G	AB	H	Avg.	HR	RBI
C	Jack Clements	109	402	106	.264	8	76
1B	Roger Connor	155	564	166	.294	12	73
2B	Bill Hallman	138	586	171	.292	2	84
3B	Charlie Reilly	91	331	65	.196	1	24
SS	Bob Allen	152	563	128	.227	2	64
OF	Ed Delahanty	123	477	146	.306	6	91
OF	Sam Thompson	153	609	186	.305	9	104
OF	Billy Hamilton	139	554	183	.330	3	53

==== Other batters ====
Note: G = Games played; AB = At bats; H = Hits; Avg. = Batting average; HR = Home runs; RBI = Runs batted in

Player	G	AB	H	Avg.	HR	RBI
Lave Cross	140	541	149	.275	4	69
Joe Mulvey	25	98	14	.143	0	4
Tom Dowse	16	54	10	.185	0	6
Dummy Stephenson	8	37	10	.270	0	5
Harry Morelock	1	3	0	.000	0	0
Jerry Connors	1	3	0	.000	0	0

=== Pitching ===
==== Starting pitchers ====
Note: G = Games pitched; IP = Innings pitched; W = Wins; L = Losses; ERA = Earned run average; SO = Strikeouts

Player	G	IP	W	L	ERA	SO
Gus Weyhing	59	469.2	32	21	2.66	202
Kid Carsey	43	317.2	19	16	3.12	76
Tim Keefe	39	313.1	19	16	2.36	136
Duke Esper	21	160.1	11	6	3.42	45
Phil Knell	11	80.0	5	5	4.05	43
Jack Taylor	3	26.0	1	0	1.38	7

==== Other pitchers ====
Note: G = Games pitched; IP = Innings pitched; W = Wins; L = Losses; ERA = Earned run average; SO = Strikeouts

Player	G	IP	W	L	ERA	SO
John Thornton	3	12.0	0	2	12.75	2
