= 1892 St. Louis Browns season =

Major League Baseball season

1892 St. Louis Browns
- League: National League
- Ballpark: Sportsman's Park
- City: St. Louis, Missouri
- Record: 1st half: 31–42 (.425); 2nd half: 25–52 (.325); Overall: 56–94 (.373)
- League place: 1st half: 9th (20 1/2 GB); 2nd half: 11th (28 1/2 GB)
- Owner: Chris von der Ahe
- Managers: Jack Glasscock (1–3); Cub Stricker (6–17); Jack Crooks (27–33); George Gore (6–9); Bob Caruthers (16–32)
- Stats: ESPN.com; Baseball Reference

The 1892 St. Louis Browns season was the team's 11th season in St. Louis, Missouri, and their first as members of the National League. In a split season schedule, the Browns finished ninth in the first half of the season and 11th in the second half. Overall, the team had a record of 56–94, 11th-best in the 12-team National League, better only than the Baltimore Orioles.

The Browns joined the National League when the American Association folded after the 1891 season and have remained a member ever since; the team has been known as the St. Louis Cardinals since 1900. This was the Browns final season before moving from the original Sportsman's Park to New Sportsman's Park, where they would remain until 1920 when they would return to the original Sportsman's Park.

== Regular season ==
=== Season standings ===
National League
Team	W	L	Pct.	GB	Home	Road
Boston Beaneaters	102	48	.680	—	54‍–‍21	48‍–‍27
Cleveland Spiders	93	56	.624	8½	54‍–‍24	39‍–‍32
Brooklyn Grooms	95	59	.617	9	51‍–‍24	44‍–‍35
Philadelphia Phillies	87	66	.569	16½	55‍–‍26	32‍–‍40
Cincinnati Reds	82	68	.547	20	45‍–‍32	37‍–‍36
Pittsburgh Pirates	80	73	.523	23½	54‍–‍34	26‍–‍39
Chicago Colts	70	76	.479	30	36‍–‍31	34‍–‍45
New York Giants	71	80	.470	31½	42‍–‍36	29‍–‍44
Louisville Colonels	63	89	.414	40	37‍–‍31	26‍–‍58
Washington Senators	58	93	.384	44½	34‍–‍36	24‍–‍57
St. Louis Browns	56	94	.373	46	37‍–‍36	19‍–‍58
Baltimore Orioles	46	101	.313	54½	29‍–‍44	17‍–‍57

National League First-half standings	W	L	Pct.	GB
Boston Beaneaters	52	22	.703	—
Brooklyn Grooms	51	26	.662	2½
Philadelphia Phillies	46	30	.605	7
Cincinnati Reds	44	31	.587	8½
Cleveland Spiders	40	33	.548	11½
Pittsburgh Pirates	37	39	.487	16
Washington Senators	35	41	.461	18
Chicago Colts	31	39	.443	19
St. Louis Browns	31	42	.425	20½
New York Giants	31	43	.419	21
Louisville Colonels	30	47	.390	23½
Baltimore Orioles	20	55	.267	32½

National League Second-half standings	W	L	Pct.	GB
Cleveland Spiders	53	23	.697	—
Boston Beaneaters	50	26	.658	3
Brooklyn Grooms	44	33	.571	9½
Pittsburgh Pirates	43	34	.558	10½
Philadelphia Phillies	41	36	.532	12½
New York Giants	40	37	.519	13½
Chicago Colts	39	37	.513	14
Cincinnati Reds	38	37	.507	14½
Louisville Colonels	33	42	.440	19½
Baltimore Orioles	26	46	.361	25
St. Louis Browns	25	52	.325	28½
Washington Senators	23	52	.307	29½

=== Record vs. opponents ===
1892 National League record Sources:
Team	BAL	BSN	BRO	CHI	CIN	CLE	LOU	NYG	PHI	PIT	STL	WAS
Baltimore	—	0–13	2–12–1	4–7	4–10	2–11–2	6–7	5–9	4–10	5–9	8–6–1	6–7–1
Boston	13–0	—	9–5	10–4	8–5–1	8–6	12–2	11–3–1	6–7	7–6	7–7	11–3
Brooklyn	12–2–1	5–9	—	10–4	6–8	8–6	9–5	7–7	9–5–2	10–4	9–5–1	10–4
Chicago	7–4	4–10	4–10	—	6–7–1	3–9	5–9	10–4	5–9	7–7	7–5	12–2
Cincinnati	10–4	5–8–1	8–6	7–6–1	—	5–9	7–6–1	8–6	5–9	5–9	12–2–1	10–3–1
Cleveland	11–2–2	6–8	6–8	9–3	9–5	—	13–1	8–5	10–4	7–7–1	8–5–1	6–8
Louisville	7–6	2–12	5–9	9–5	6–7–1	1–13	—	4–10	4–10	8–6	9–5–1	8–6
New York	9–5	3–11–1	7–7	4–10	6–8	5–8	10–4	—	5–9	4–10–1	9–4	9–4
Philadelphia	10–4	7–6	5–9–2	9–5	9–5	4–10	10–4	9–5	—	8–6	7–7	9–5
Pittsburgh	9–5	6–7	4–10	7–7	9–5	7–7–1	6–8	10–4–1	6–8	—	10–4	6–8
St. Louis	6–8–1	7–7	5–9–1	5–7	2–12–1	5–8–1	5–9–1	4–9	7–7	4–10	—	6–8
Washington	7–6–1	3–11	4–10	2–12	3–10–1	8–6	6–8	4–9	5–9	8–6	8–6	—

=== Roster ===
1892 St. Louis Browns
Roster
Pitchers: Ted Breitenstein; Frank Dwyer; Jack Easton; Pud Galvin; Charlie Getzien; Kid Gleason; Bill Hawke; Pink Hawley; J. B. Young	Catchers: Frank Bird; Grant Briggs; Dick Buckley; Bill Moran; Heinie Peitz; Infielders: Lew Camp; Hick Carpenter; Jack Crooks; Frank Genins; Jack Glasscock; Bill Kuehne; Jim McCormick; Mark McGrillis; Kohly Miller; George Pinkney; Cub Stricker; Perry Werden	Outfielders: Steve Brodie; Cliff Carroll; Bob Caruthers; Bill Collins; George Gore; Ed Haigh; Leonard; Gene Moriarty; John Thornton; Bill Van Dyke; Jimmy Wolf	Manager: Bob Caruthers; Jack Crooks; Jack Glasscock; George Gore; Cub Stricker

== Player stats ==
=== Batting ===
==== Starters by position ====
Note: Pos = Position; G = Games played; AB = At bats; H = Hits; Avg. = Batting average; HR = Home runs; RBI = Runs batted in

Pos	Player	G	AB	H	Avg.	HR	RBI
C	Dick Buckley	121	410	93	.227	5	52
1B	Perry Werden	149	598	154	.258	8	84
2B	Jack Crooks	128	445	95	.213	7	38
SS	Jack Glasscock	139	566	151	.267	3	72
3B	George Pinkney	78	290	50	.172	0	25
OF	Bob Caruthers	143	513	142	.277	3	69
OF	Cliff Carroll	101	407	111	.273	4	49
OF	Steve Brodie	154	602	153	.254	4	60

==== Other batters ====
Note: G = Games played; AB = At bats; H = Hits; Avg. = Batting average; HR = Home runs; RBI = Runs batted in

Player	G	AB	H	Avg.	HR	RBI
Gene Moriarity	47	177	31	.175	3	19
Lew Camp	42	145	30	.207	2	13
Cub Stricker	28	98	20	.204	0	11
Bill Moran	24	81	11	.136	0	5
George Gore	20	73	15	.205	0	4
Grant Briggs	22	55	4	.073	0	1
Frank Genins	15	51	10	.196	0	4
Frank Bird	17	50	10	.200	1	1
Bill Kuehne	7	28	4	.143	0	0
Bill Van Dyke	4	16	2	.125	0	1
Chicken Wolf	3	14	2	.143	0	1
Jim McCormick	3	11	0	.000	0	0
Kohly Miller	1	4	0	.000	0	0
Ed Haigh	1	4	1	.250	0	0
Hick Carpenter	1	3	1	.333	0	0
Mark McGrillis	1	3	0	.000	0	0
John Thornton	1	3	0	.000	0	0
Heinie Peitz	1	3	0	.000	0	0
Bill Collins	1	2	0	.000	0	0
Leonard	1	0	0	----	0	0

=== Pitching ===
==== Starting pitchers ====
Note: G = Games pitched; IP = Innings pitched; W = Wins; L = Losses; ERA = Earned run average; SO = Strikeouts

Player	G	IP	W	L	ERA	SO
Kid Gleason	47	400.0	20	24	3.33	133
Ted Breitenstein	39	282.1	9	19	4.69	126
Pink Hawley	20	166.1	6	14	3.19	63
Pretzels Getzien	13	108.0	5	8	5.67	32
Bill Hawke	14	97.1	5	5	3.70	55
Pud Galvin	12	92.0	5	6	3.23	27
Frank Dwyer	10	64.0	2	8	5.63	16

==== Other pitchers ====
Note: G = Games pitched; IP = Innings pitched; W = Wins; L = Losses; ERA = Earned run average; SO = Strikeouts

Player	G	IP	W	L	ERA	SO
Bob Caruthers	16	101.2	2	10	5.84	21
Jack Easton	5	31.0	2	0	6.39	4

==== Relief pitchers ====
Note: G = Games pitched; W = Wins; L = Losses; SV = Saves; ERA = Earned run average; SO = Strikeouts

Player	G	W	L	SV	ERA	SO
J. B. Young	1	0	0	0	22.50	1
