= 1892 New York Giants season =

1892 New York Giants
- League: National League
- Ballpark: Polo Grounds
- City: New York City
- Record: 1st half: 31–43 (.419); 2nd half: 40–37 (.519); Overall: 71–80 (.470)
- League place: 1st half: 10th (21 GB); 2nd half: 6th (13 1/2 GB)
- Owners: John B. Day
- Managers: Patrick T. Powers

The 1892 New York Giants season was the tenth season of the New York Giants professional baseball franchise as members of the National League. In a split season schedule, the Giants finished tenth in the first half of the season and sixth in the second half. Overall, the team had a record of 71–80, eighth-best in the 12-team National League.

== Regular season ==
=== Season standings ===
National League
Team	W	L	Pct.	GB	Home	Road
Boston Beaneaters	102	48	.680	—	54‍–‍21	48‍–‍27
Cleveland Spiders	93	56	.624	8½	54‍–‍24	39‍–‍32
Brooklyn Grooms	95	59	.617	9	51‍–‍24	44‍–‍35
Philadelphia Phillies	87	66	.569	16½	55‍–‍26	32‍–‍40
Cincinnati Reds	82	68	.547	20	45‍–‍32	37‍–‍36
Pittsburgh Pirates	80	73	.523	23½	54‍–‍34	26‍–‍39
Chicago Colts	70	76	.479	30	36‍–‍31	34‍–‍45
New York Giants	71	80	.470	31½	42‍–‍36	29‍–‍44
Louisville Colonels	63	89	.414	40	37‍–‍31	26‍–‍58
Washington Senators	58	93	.384	44½	34‍–‍36	24‍–‍57
St. Louis Browns	56	94	.373	46	37‍–‍36	19‍–‍58
Baltimore Orioles	46	101	.313	54½	29‍–‍44	17‍–‍57

National League First-half standings	W	L	Pct.	GB
Boston Beaneaters	52	22	.703	—
Brooklyn Grooms	51	26	.662	2½
Philadelphia Phillies	46	30	.605	7
Cincinnati Reds	44	31	.587	8½
Cleveland Spiders	40	33	.548	11½
Pittsburgh Pirates	37	39	.487	16
Washington Senators	35	41	.461	18
Chicago Colts	31	39	.443	19
St. Louis Browns	31	42	.425	20½
New York Giants	31	43	.419	21
Louisville Colonels	30	47	.390	23½
Baltimore Orioles	20	55	.267	32½

National League Second-half standings	W	L	Pct.	GB
Cleveland Spiders	53	23	.697	—
Boston Beaneaters	50	26	.658	3
Brooklyn Grooms	44	33	.571	9½
Pittsburgh Pirates	43	34	.558	10½
Philadelphia Phillies	41	36	.532	12½
New York Giants	40	37	.519	13½
Chicago Colts	39	37	.513	14
Cincinnati Reds	38	37	.507	14½
Louisville Colonels	33	42	.440	19½
Baltimore Orioles	26	46	.361	25
St. Louis Browns	25	52	.325	28½
Washington Senators	23	52	.307	29½

=== Record vs. opponents ===
1892 National League record Sources:
Team	BAL	BSN	BRO	CHI	CIN	CLE	LOU	NYG	PHI	PIT	STL	WAS
Baltimore	—	0–13	2–12–1	4–7	4–10	2–11–2	6–7	5–9	4–10	5–9	8–6–1	6–7–1
Boston	13–0	—	9–5	10–4	8–5–1	8–6	12–2	11–3–1	6–7	7–6	7–7	11–3
Brooklyn	12–2–1	5–9	—	10–4	6–8	8–6	9–5	7–7	9–5–2	10–4	9–5–1	10–4
Chicago	7–4	4–10	4–10	—	6–7–1	3–9	5–9	10–4	5–9	7–7	7–5	12–2
Cincinnati	10–4	5–8–1	8–6	7–6–1	—	5–9	7–6–1	8–6	5–9	5–9	12–2–1	10–3–1
Cleveland	11–2–2	6–8	6–8	9–3	9–5	—	13–1	8–5	10–4	7–7–1	8–5–1	6–8
Louisville	7–6	2–12	5–9	9–5	6–7–1	1–13	—	4–10	4–10	8–6	9–5–1	8–6
New York	9–5	3–11–1	7–7	4–10	6–8	5–8	10–4	—	5–9	4–10–1	9–4	9–4
Philadelphia	10–4	7–6	5–9–2	9–5	9–5	4–10	10–4	9–5	—	8–6	7–7	9–5
Pittsburgh	9–5	6–7	4–10	7–7	9–5	7–7–1	6–8	10–4–1	6–8	—	10–4	6–8
St. Louis	6–8–1	7–7	5–9–1	5–7	2–12–1	5–8–1	5–9–1	4–9	7–7	4–10	—	6–8
Washington	7–6–1	3–11	4–10	2–12	3–10–1	8–6	6–8	4–9	5–9	8–6	8–6	—

=== Roster ===
1892 New York Giants
Roster
Pitchers: Ed Crane; Silver King; Amos Rusie; Mickey Welch; Catchers: Jack Boyle; Danny Murphy	Infielders: Charley Bassett; Eddie Burke; Jack Doyle; Buck Ewing; Shorty Fuller; Willie Keeler; Jimmy Knowles; Denny Lyons; Jack McMahon; Hardy Richardson	Outfielders: Jocko Fields; George Gore; Harry Lyons; Charlie Newman; Jim O'Rourke; Jack Sharrott; Mike Tiernan	Manager: Patrick T. Powers

== Player stats ==
=== Batting ===
==== Starters by position ====
Note: Pos = Position; G = Games played; AB = At bats; H = Hits; Avg. = Batting average; HR = Home runs; RBI = Runs batted in

Pos	Player	G	AB	H	Avg.	HR	RBI
C	Jack Boyle	120	436	80	.183	0	32
1B	Buck Ewing	105	393	122	.310	8	76
2B	Eddie Burke	89	363	94	.259	6	41
SS	Shorty Fuller	141	508	116	.228	1	48
3B	Denny Lyons	108	389	100	.257	8	51
OF	Jim O'Rourke	115	448	136	.304	0	56
OF	Harry Lyons	96	411	98	.238	0	53
OF	Mike Tiernan	116	450	130	.289	5	66

==== Other batters ====
Note: G = Games played; AB = At bats; H = Hits; Avg. = Batting average; HR = Home runs; RBI = Runs batted in

Player	G	AB	H	Avg.	HR	RBI
Jack Doyle	90	366	109	.298	5	55
Hardy Richardson	64	248	53	.214	2	34
George Gore	53	193	49	.254	0	11
Jack McMahon	40	147	33	.224	1	24
Charley Bassett	35	130	27	.208	0	16
Jocko Fields	21	66	18	.273	0	5
Jimmy Knowles	16	59	9	.153	0	7
Willie Keeler	14	53	17	.321	0	6
Danny Murphy	8	26	3	.115	0	0
Charlie Newman	3	12	4	.333	0	1
Jack Sharrott	4	8	1	.125	0	0

=== Pitching ===
==== Starting pitchers ====
Note: G = Games pitched; IP = Innings pitched; W = Wins; L = Losses; ERA = Earned run average; SO = Strikeouts

Player	G	IP	W	L	ERA	SO
Amos Rusie	65	541.0	32	31	2.84	304
Silver King	51	410.1	22	24	3.29	170
Ed Crane	47	364.1	16	24	3.80	174
Mickey Welch	1	5.0	0	0	14.40	1

==== Relief pitchers ====
Note: G = Games pitched; W = Wins; L = Losses; SV = Saves; ERA = Earned run average; SO = Strikeouts

Player	G	W	L	SV	ERA	SO
Jack Sharrott	1	0	0	0	4.50	1
