= 1892 Baltimore Orioles season =

1892 Baltimore Orioles
- League: National League
- Ballpark: Union Park
- City: Baltimore, Maryland
- Record: 1st half: 20–55 (.267); 2nd half: 26–46 (.361); Overall: 46–101 (.313)
- League place: 1st half: 12th (32 1/2 GB); 2nd half: 10th (25 GB)
- Owner: Harry Von der Horst
- Managers: George Van Haltren, John Waltz, Ned Hanlon

The 1892 Baltimore Orioles season was the first season that the professional baseball team known as the Baltimore Orioles competed in the National League, following the demise of the American Association. In a split season schedule, the Orioles finished last in the first half of the season and 10th in the second half. Overall, the team had a record of 46–101, worst in the 12-team National League. The 19th-century Orioles franchise is not the Baltimore Orioles franchise that has competed in the American League since 1954.

== Regular season ==
=== Season standings ===
National League
Team	W	L	Pct.	GB	Home	Road
Boston Beaneaters	102	48	.680	—	54‍–‍21	48‍–‍27
Cleveland Spiders	93	56	.624	8½	54‍–‍24	39‍–‍32
Brooklyn Grooms	95	59	.617	9	51‍–‍24	44‍–‍35
Philadelphia Phillies	87	66	.569	16½	55‍–‍26	32‍–‍40
Cincinnati Reds	82	68	.547	20	45‍–‍32	37‍–‍36
Pittsburgh Pirates	80	73	.523	23½	54‍–‍34	26‍–‍39
Chicago Colts	70	76	.479	30	36‍–‍31	34‍–‍45
New York Giants	71	80	.470	31½	42‍–‍36	29‍–‍44
Louisville Colonels	63	89	.414	40	37‍–‍31	26‍–‍58
Washington Senators	58	93	.384	44½	34‍–‍36	24‍–‍57
St. Louis Browns	56	94	.373	46	37‍–‍36	19‍–‍58
Baltimore Orioles	46	101	.313	54½	29‍–‍44	17‍–‍57

National League First-half standings	W	L	Pct.	GB
Boston Beaneaters	52	22	.703	—
Brooklyn Grooms	51	26	.662	2½
Philadelphia Phillies	46	30	.605	7
Cincinnati Reds	44	31	.587	8½
Cleveland Spiders	40	33	.548	11½
Pittsburgh Pirates	37	39	.487	16
Washington Senators	35	41	.461	18
Chicago Colts	31	39	.443	19
St. Louis Browns	31	42	.425	20½
New York Giants	31	43	.419	21
Louisville Colonels	30	47	.390	23½
Baltimore Orioles	20	55	.267	32½

National League Second-half standings	W	L	Pct.	GB
Cleveland Spiders	53	23	.697	—
Boston Beaneaters	50	26	.658	3
Brooklyn Grooms	44	33	.571	9½
Pittsburgh Pirates	43	34	.558	10½
Philadelphia Phillies	41	36	.532	12½
New York Giants	40	37	.519	13½
Chicago Colts	39	37	.513	14
Cincinnati Reds	38	37	.507	14½
Louisville Colonels	33	42	.440	19½
Baltimore Orioles	26	46	.361	25
St. Louis Browns	25	52	.325	28½
Washington Senators	23	52	.307	29½

=== Record vs. opponents ===
1892 National League record Sources:
Team	BAL	BSN	BRO	CHI	CIN	CLE	LOU	NYG	PHI	PIT	STL	WAS
Baltimore	—	0–13	2–12–1	4–7	4–10	2–11–2	6–7	5–9	4–10	5–9	8–6–1	6–7–1
Boston	13–0	—	9–5	10–4	8–5–1	8–6	12–2	11–3–1	6–7	7–6	7–7	11–3
Brooklyn	12–2–1	5–9	—	10–4	6–8	8–6	9–5	7–7	9–5–2	10–4	9–5–1	10–4
Chicago	7–4	4–10	4–10	—	6–7–1	3–9	5–9	10–4	5–9	7–7	7–5	12–2
Cincinnati	10–4	5–8–1	8–6	7–6–1	—	5–9	7–6–1	8–6	5–9	5–9	12–2–1	10–3–1
Cleveland	11–2–2	6–8	6–8	9–3	9–5	—	13–1	8–5	10–4	7–7–1	8–5–1	6–8
Louisville	7–6	2–12	5–9	9–5	6–7–1	1–13	—	4–10	4–10	8–6	9–5–1	8–6
New York	9–5	3–11–1	7–7	4–10	6–8	5–8	10–4	—	5–9	4–10–1	9–4	9–4
Philadelphia	10–4	7–6	5–9–2	9–5	9–5	4–10	10–4	9–5	—	8–6	7–7	9–5
Pittsburgh	9–5	6–7	4–10	7–7	9–5	7–7–1	6–8	10–4–1	6–8	—	10–4	6–8
St. Louis	6–8–1	7–7	5–9–1	5–7	2–12–1	5–8–1	5–9–1	4–9	7–7	4–10	—	6–8
Washington	7–6–1	3–11	4–10	2–12	3–10–1	8–6	6–8	4–9	5–9	8–6	8–6	—

=== Roster ===
1892 Baltimore Orioles
Roster
Pitchers: Charlie Buffinton; George Cobb; Harry Ely; Alex Ferson; Bill Gilbert; Egyptian Healy; Bill Kling; Sadie McMahon; Crazy Schmit; Ben Stephens; Adonis Terry; Tom Vickery	Catchers: Joe Gunson; Tom Hess; Wilbert Robinson; Infielders: Monte Cross; Pete Gilbert; Tim O'Rourke; John Pickett; Billy Shindle; George Shoch; Cub Stricker; Sy Sutcliffe; Lew Whistler	Outfielders: Sun Daly; Frank Foreman; John Godar; Jocko Halligan; Ned Hanlon; Lefty Johnson; Joe Kelley; John McGraw; Harry Stovey; George Van Haltren; Piggy Ward; Curt Welch; George Wood	Manager: Ned Hanlon; George Van Haltren; John Waltz

== Player stats ==
=== Batting ===
==== Starters by position ====
Pos = Position; G = Games played; AB = At bats; H = Hits; Avg. = Batting average; HR = Home runs; RBI = Runs batted in

Pos	Player	G	AB	H	Avg.	HR	RBI
C	Wilbert Robinson	90	330	88	.267	2	57
1B	Sy Sutcliffe	66	276	77	.279	1	27
2B	Cub Stricker	75	269	71	.264	3	37
SS	Tim O'Rourke	63	239	74	.310	0	35
3B	Billy Shindle	143	619	156	.252	3	50
OF	Harry Stovey	74	283	77	.272	4	55
OF	Curt Welch	63	237	56	.236	1	22
OF	George Van Haltren	135	556	168	.302	7	57

==== Other batters ====
G = Games played; AB = At bats; H = Hits; Avg. = Batting average; HR = Home runs; RBI = Runs batted in

Player	G	AB	H	Avg.	HR	RBI
Joe Gunson	89	314	67	.213	0	32
George Shoch	76	308	85	.276	1	50
John McGraw	79	286	77	.269	1	26
Lew Whistler	52	209	47	.225	2	21
Piggy Ward	56	186	54	.290	1	33
Jocko Halligan	46	178	48	.270	2	43
John Pickett	36	141	30	.213	1	12
George Wood	21	76	17	.224	0	10
Monte Cross	15	50	8	.160	0	2
Sun Daly	13	48	12	.250	0	7
Ned Hanlon	11	43	7	.163	0	2
Joe Kelley	10	33	7	.212	0	4
Frank Foreman	7	23	4	.174	0	1
Lefty Johnson	4	15	2	.133	0	2
Pete Gilbert	4	15	3	.200	0	0
John Godar	5	14	3	.214	0	1
Tom Hess	1	2	0	.000	0	0

=== Pitching ===
==== Starting pitchers ====
G = Games pitched; IP = Innings pitched; W = Wins; L = Losses; ERA = Earned run average; SO = Strikeouts

Player	G	IP	W	L	ERA	SO
Sadie McMahon	48	397.0	19	25	3.24	118
George Cobb	53	394.1	10	37	4.86	159
Tom Vickery	24	176.0	8	10	3.53	49
Charlie Buffinton	13	97.0	4	8	4.92	30
Egyptian Healy	9	68.1	3	6	4.74	24
Crazy Schmit	6	47.1	1	4	3.23	17
Bill Kling	2	11.0	0	2	11.45	7
Adonis Terry	1	9.0	0	1	4.00	3
Harry Ely	1	7.0	0	1	7.71	0

==== Other pitchers ====
G = Games pitched; IP = Innings pitched; W = Wins; L = Losses; ERA = Earned run average; SO = Strikeouts

Player	G	IP	W	L	ERA	SO
Ben Stephens	5	29.0	1	1	2.79	7
Frank Foreman	4	25.0	0	3	6.84	5
Bill Gilbert	2	14.0	0	1	5.79	5
Alex Ferson	2	9.0	0	1	11.00	8

==== Relief pitchers ====
G = Games pitched; W = Wins; L = Losses; SV = Saves; ERA = Earned run average; SO = Strikeouts

Player	G	W	L	SV	ERA	SO
George Van Haltren	4	0	0	0	9.20	5
