= 1892 Pittsburgh Pirates season =

1892 Pittsburgh Pirates
- League: National League
- Ballpark: Exposition Park
- City: Allegheny, Pennsylvania
- Record: 1st half: 37–39 (.487); 2nd half: 43–34 (.558); Overall: 80–73 (.523)
- League place: 1st half: 6th (16 GB); 2nd half: 4th (10 1/2 GB)
- Owners: William Kerr and Phil Auten
- Managers: Tom Burns, Al Buckenberger

The 1892 Pittsburgh Pirates season was the 11th season of the Pittsburgh Pirates franchise; their sixth in the National League. (Note: Until the early 20th century, the name of Pittsburgh was spelled both with and without the final 'h'.) In a split season schedule, the Pirates finished sixth in the first half of the season and fourth in the second half. Overall, the team had a record of 80–73, sixth-best in the 12-team National League.

== Regular season ==
=== Season standings ===
National League
Team	W	L	Pct.	GB	Home	Road
Boston Beaneaters	102	48	.680	—	54‍–‍21	48‍–‍27
Cleveland Spiders	93	56	.624	8½	54‍–‍24	39‍–‍32
Brooklyn Grooms	95	59	.617	9	51‍–‍24	44‍–‍35
Philadelphia Phillies	87	66	.569	16½	55‍–‍26	32‍–‍40
Cincinnati Reds	82	68	.547	20	45‍–‍32	37‍–‍36
Pittsburgh Pirates	80	73	.523	23½	54‍–‍34	26‍–‍39
Chicago Colts	70	76	.479	30	36‍–‍31	34‍–‍45
New York Giants	71	80	.470	31½	42‍–‍36	29‍–‍44
Louisville Colonels	63	89	.414	40	37‍–‍31	26‍–‍58
Washington Senators	58	93	.384	44½	34‍–‍36	24‍–‍57
St. Louis Browns	56	94	.373	46	37‍–‍36	19‍–‍58
Baltimore Orioles	46	101	.313	54½	29‍–‍44	17‍–‍57

National League First-half standings	W	L	Pct.	GB
Boston Beaneaters	52	22	.703	—
Brooklyn Grooms	51	26	.662	2½
Philadelphia Phillies	46	30	.605	7
Cincinnati Reds	44	31	.587	8½
Cleveland Spiders	40	33	.548	11½
Pittsburgh Pirates	37	39	.487	16
Washington Senators	35	41	.461	18
Chicago Colts	31	39	.443	19
St. Louis Browns	31	42	.425	20½
New York Giants	31	43	.419	21
Louisville Colonels	30	47	.390	23½
Baltimore Orioles	20	55	.267	32½

National League Second-half standings	W	L	Pct.	GB
Cleveland Spiders	53	23	.697	—
Boston Beaneaters	50	26	.658	3
Brooklyn Grooms	44	33	.571	9½
Pittsburgh Pirates	43	34	.558	10½
Philadelphia Phillies	41	36	.532	12½
New York Giants	40	37	.519	13½
Chicago Colts	39	37	.513	14
Cincinnati Reds	38	37	.507	14½
Louisville Colonels	33	42	.440	19½
Baltimore Orioles	26	46	.361	25
St. Louis Browns	25	52	.325	28½
Washington Senators	23	52	.307	29½

=== Record vs. opponents ===
1892 National League record Sources:
Team	BAL	BSN	BRO	CHI	CIN	CLE	LOU	NYG	PHI	PIT	STL	WAS
Baltimore	—	0–13	2–12–1	4–7	4–10	2–11–2	6–7	5–9	4–10	5–9	8–6–1	6–7–1
Boston	13–0	—	9–5	10–4	8–5–1	8–6	12–2	11–3–1	6–7	7–6	7–7	11–3
Brooklyn	12–2–1	5–9	—	10–4	6–8	8–6	9–5	7–7	9–5–2	10–4	9–5–1	10–4
Chicago	7–4	4–10	4–10	—	6–7–1	3–9	5–9	10–4	5–9	7–7	7–5	12–2
Cincinnati	10–4	5–8–1	8–6	7–6–1	—	5–9	7–6–1	8–6	5–9	5–9	12–2–1	10–3–1
Cleveland	11–2–2	6–8	6–8	9–3	9–5	—	13–1	8–5	10–4	7–7–1	8–5–1	6–8
Louisville	7–6	2–12	5–9	9–5	6–7–1	1–13	—	4–10	4–10	8–6	9–5–1	8–6
New York	9–5	3–11–1	7–7	4–10	6–8	5–8	10–4	—	5–9	4–10–1	9–4	9–4
Philadelphia	10–4	7–6	5–9–2	9–5	9–5	4–10	10–4	9–5	—	8–6	7–7	9–5
Pittsburgh	9–5	6–7	4–10	7–7	9–5	7–7–1	6–8	10–4–1	6–8	—	10–4	6–8
St. Louis	6–8–1	7–7	5–9–1	5–7	2–12–1	5–8–1	5–9–1	4–9	7–7	4–10	—	6–8
Washington	7–6–1	3–11	4–10	2–12	3–10–1	8–6	6–8	4–9	5–9	8–6	8–6	—

=== Roster ===
1892 Pittsburgh Pirates
Roster
Pitchers: Mark Baldwin; Kid Camp; Red Ehret; Duke Esper; Pud Galvin; Billy Gumbert; Adonis Terry; Will Thompson; Fred Woodcock	Catchers: Billy Earle; Connie Mack; Infielders: Jake Beckley; Lou Bierbauer; Tom Burns; Bobby Cargo; Duke Farrell; Doggie Miller; Harry Raymond; Frank Shugart	Outfielders: Pop Corkhill; Patsy Donovan; Joe Kelley; Jock Menefee; Mike Smith; Jake Stenzel; Ed Swartwood; George Van Haltren	Manager: Tom Burns; Al Buckenberger

== Player stats ==
=== Batting ===
==== Starters by position ====
Note: Pos = Position; G = Games played; AB = At bats; H = Hits; Avg. = Batting average; HR = Home runs; RBI = Runs batted in

Pos	Player	G	AB	H	Avg.	HR	RBI
C	Connie Mack	97	346	84	.243	1	31
1B	Jake Beckley	151	614	145	.236	10	96
2B	Lou Bierbauer	152	649	153	.236	8	65
SS	Frank Shugart	137	554	148	.267	0	62
3B	Duke Farrell	152	605	130	.215	8	77
OF	Pop Corkhill	68	256	47	.184	0	25
OF	Mike Smith	138	511	140	.274	4	63
OF	Patsy Donovan	90	388	114	.294	2	26

==== Other batters ====
Note: G = Games played; AB = At bats; H = Hits; Avg. = Batting average; HR = Home runs; RBI = Runs batted in

Player	G	AB	H	Avg.	HR	RBI
Doggie Miller	149	623	158	.254	2	59
Joe Kelley	56	205	49	.239	0	28
George Van Haltren	13	55	11	.200	0	5
Harry Raymond	12	49	4	.082	0	2
Ed Swartwood	55	42	10	.238	0	4
Tom Burns	12	39	8	.205	0	4
Billy Earle	5	13	7	.538	0	3
Jake Stenzel	3	9	0	.000	0	0
Bobby Cargo	2	4	1	.250	0	0
Jock Menefee	2	3	0	.000	0	0

=== Pitching ===
==== Starting pitchers ====
Note: G = Games pitched; IP = Innings pitched; W = Wins; L = Losses; ERA = Earned run average; SO = Strikeouts

Player	G	IP	W	L	ERA	SO
Mark Baldwin	56	440.1	26	27	3.47	157
Red Ehret	39	316.0	16	20	2.65	101
Adonis Terry	30	240.0	18	7	2.51	95
Mike Smith	17	134.0	6	7	3.63	51
Pud Galvin	12	96.0	5	6	2.63	29
Fred Woodcock	5	33.0	1	2	3.55	8
Duke Esper	3	18.1	2	0	5.40	5
Will Thompson	1	3.0	0	1	3.00	0

==== Other pitchers ====
Note: G = Games pitched; IP = Innings pitched; W = Wins; L = Losses; ERA = Earned run average; SO = Strikeouts

Player	G	IP	W	L	ERA	SO
Billy Gumbert	6	39.2	3	2	1.36	3
Kid Camp	4	23.0	0	1	6.26	6

==== Relief pitchers ====
Note: G = Games pitched; W = Wins; L = Losses; SV = Saves; ERA = Earned run average; SO = Strikeouts

Player	G	IP	W	L	ERA	SO
Jock Menefee	1	0	0	0	11.25	0
