= 1892 Washington Senators season =

1892 Washington Senators
- League: National League
- Ballpark: Boundary Field
- City: Washington, D.C.
- Record: 1st half: 35–41 (.461); 2nd half: 23–52 (.307); Overall: 58–93 (.384)
- League place: 1st half: 7th (18 GB); 2nd half: 12th (29 1/2 GB)
- Owner: J. Earl Wagner
- Managers: Billy Barnie, Arthur Irwin, Danny Richardson

The 1892 Washington Senators season was a season in American professional baseball. The team, which had played in the now-defunct American Association in 1891 as the Washington Statesmen, was purchased by J. Earl Wagner and moved to the National League for the 1892 season. In a split season schedule, the Senators finished seventh in the first half of the season and last in the second half. Overall, the team had a record of 58–93, 10th-best in the 12-team National League.

== Preseason ==
The Senators held spring training in Savannah, Georgia at Bolton Street Park.

== Regular season ==
=== Season standings ===
National League
Team	W	L	Pct.	GB	Home	Road
Boston Beaneaters	102	48	.680	—	54‍–‍21	48‍–‍27
Cleveland Spiders	93	56	.624	8½	54‍–‍24	39‍–‍32
Brooklyn Grooms	95	59	.617	9	51‍–‍24	44‍–‍35
Philadelphia Phillies	87	66	.569	16½	55‍–‍26	32‍–‍40
Cincinnati Reds	82	68	.547	20	45‍–‍32	37‍–‍36
Pittsburgh Pirates	80	73	.523	23½	54‍–‍34	26‍–‍39
Chicago Colts	70	76	.479	30	36‍–‍31	34‍–‍45
New York Giants	71	80	.470	31½	42‍–‍36	29‍–‍44
Louisville Colonels	63	89	.414	40	37‍–‍31	26‍–‍58
Washington Senators	58	93	.384	44½	34‍–‍36	24‍–‍57
St. Louis Browns	56	94	.373	46	37‍–‍36	19‍–‍58
Baltimore Orioles	46	101	.313	54½	29‍–‍44	17‍–‍57

National League First-half standings	W	L	Pct.	GB
Boston Beaneaters	52	22	.703	—
Brooklyn Grooms	51	26	.662	2½
Philadelphia Phillies	46	30	.605	7
Cincinnati Reds	44	31	.587	8½
Cleveland Spiders	40	33	.548	11½
Pittsburgh Pirates	37	39	.487	16
Washington Senators	35	41	.461	18
Chicago Colts	31	39	.443	19
St. Louis Browns	31	42	.425	20½
New York Giants	31	43	.419	21
Louisville Colonels	30	47	.390	23½
Baltimore Orioles	20	55	.267	32½

National League Second-half standings	W	L	Pct.	GB
Cleveland Spiders	53	23	.697	—
Boston Beaneaters	50	26	.658	3
Brooklyn Grooms	44	33	.571	9½
Pittsburgh Pirates	43	34	.558	10½
Philadelphia Phillies	41	36	.532	12½
New York Giants	40	37	.519	13½
Chicago Colts	39	37	.513	14
Cincinnati Reds	38	37	.507	14½
Louisville Colonels	33	42	.440	19½
Baltimore Orioles	26	46	.361	25
St. Louis Browns	25	52	.325	28½
Washington Senators	23	52	.307	29½

=== Record vs. opponents ===
1892 National League record Sources:
Team	BAL	BSN	BRO	CHI	CIN	CLE	LOU	NYG	PHI	PIT	STL	WAS
Baltimore	—	0–13	2–12–1	4–7	4–10	2–11–2	6–7	5–9	4–10	5–9	8–6–1	6–7–1
Boston	13–0	—	9–5	10–4	8–5–1	8–6	12–2	11–3–1	6–7	7–6	7–7	11–3
Brooklyn	12–2–1	5–9	—	10–4	6–8	8–6	9–5	7–7	9–5–2	10–4	9–5–1	10–4
Chicago	7–4	4–10	4–10	—	6–7–1	3–9	5–9	10–4	5–9	7–7	7–5	12–2
Cincinnati	10–4	5–8–1	8–6	7–6–1	—	5–9	7–6–1	8–6	5–9	5–9	12–2–1	10–3–1
Cleveland	11–2–2	6–8	6–8	9–3	9–5	—	13–1	8–5	10–4	7–7–1	8–5–1	6–8
Louisville	7–6	2–12	5–9	9–5	6–7–1	1–13	—	4–10	4–10	8–6	9–5–1	8–6
New York	9–5	3–11–1	7–7	4–10	6–8	5–8	10–4	—	5–9	4–10–1	9–4	9–4
Philadelphia	10–4	7–6	5–9–2	9–5	9–5	4–10	10–4	9–5	—	8–6	7–7	9–5
Pittsburgh	9–5	6–7	4–10	7–7	9–5	7–7–1	6–8	10–4–1	6–8	—	10–4	6–8
St. Louis	6–8–1	7–7	5–9–1	5–7	2–12–1	5–8–1	5–9–1	4–9	7–7	4–10	—	6–8
Washington	7–6–1	3–11	4–10	2–12	3–10–1	8–6	6–8	4–9	5–9	8–6	8–6	—

=== Roster ===
1892 Washington Senators
Roster
Pitchers: Bert Abbey; John Dolan; Jesse Duryea; Frank Foreman; Hank Gastright; Bert Inks; Alex Jones; Frank Killen; Matt Kilroy; Phil Knell; Jouett Meekin	Catchers: Deacon McGuire; Jocko Milligan; Hal O'Hagan; Doc Potts; Infielders: Tun Berger; Jimmy Cooney; Tommy Dowd; Jake Drauby; Henry Larkin; Kohly Miller; Harry Raymond; Danny Richardson; Yank Robinson; Frank Shannon; George Ulrich	Outfielders: Patsy Donovan; Tom Dowse; Charlie Duffee; Dummy Hoy; Paul Radford; Hardy Richardson; Larry Twitchell	Manager: Billy Barnie; Arthur Irwin; Danny Richardson

== Player stats ==
=== Batting ===
==== Starters by position ====
Note: Pos = Position; G = Games played; AB = At bats; H = Hits; Avg. = Batting average; HR = Home runs; RBI = Runs batted in

Pos	Player	G	AB	H	Avg.	HR	RBI
C	Deacon McGuire	97	315	73	.232	4	43
1B	Henry Larkin	119	464	130	.280	8	96
2B	Tommy Dowd	144	584	142	.243	1	50
SS	Danny Richardson	142	551	132	.240	3	58
3B	Yank Robinson	67	218	39	.179	0	19
OF	Dummy Hoy	152	593	167	.282	3	75
OF	Paul Radford	137	510	130	.255	1	37
OF	Charlie Duffee	132	492	122	.248	6	51

==== Other batters ====
Note: G = Games played; AB = At bats; H = Hits; Avg. = Batting average; HR = Home runs; RBI = Runs batted in

Player	G	AB	H	Avg.	HR	RBI
Jocko Milligan	88	323	89	.276	4	43
Larry Twitchell	51	192	42	.219	0	20
Patsy Donovan	40	163	39	.239	0	12
Tun Berger	26	97	14	.144	0	3
Hardy Richardson	10	37	4	.108	0	0
Jake Drauby	10	34	7	.206	0	3
Tom Dowse	7	27	7	.259	0	2
Jimmy Cooney	6	25	4	.160	0	4
George Ulrich	6	24	7	.292	0	0
Harry Raymond	4	15	1	.067	0	0
Doc Potts	1	4	1	.250	0	0
Frank Shannon	1	4	1	.250	0	2
Hal O'Hagen	1	4	1	.250	0	0
Kohly Miller	1	3	0	.000	0	0

=== Pitching ===
==== Starting pitchers ====
Note: G = Games pitched; IP = Innings pitched; W = Wins; L = Losses; ERA = Earned run average; SO = Strikeouts

Player	G	IP	W	L	ERA	SO
Frank Killen	60	459.2	29	26	3.31	147
Bert Abbey	27	195.2	5	18	3.45	77
Phil Knell	22	170.0	9	13	3.65	74
Jesse Duryea	18	127.0	3	11	2.41	48
Jouett Meekin	14	112.0	3	10	3.46	58
Hank Gastright	11	79.2	3	3	5.08	32
John Dolan	5	37.0	2	2	4.38	8
Alex Jones	4	27.0	0	3	4.00	7
Bert Inks	3	21.0	1	2	5.14	11

==== Other pitchers ====
Note: G = Games pitched; IP = Innings pitched; W = Wins; L = Losses; ERA = Earned run average; SO = Strikeouts

Player	G	IP	W	L	ERA	SO
Frank Foreman	11	60.0	2	4	3.30	16
Matt Kilroy	4	26.1	1	1	2.39	1
