= 1892 Brooklyn Grooms season =

1892 Brooklyn Grooms
- League: National League
- Ballpark: Eastern Park
- City: Brooklyn, New York
- Record: 1st half: 51–26 (.662); 2nd half: 44–33 (.571); Overall: 95–59 (.617)
- League place: 1st half: 2nd (2 1/2 GB); 2nd half: 3rd (9 1/2 GB)
- Owners: Charles Byrne, Ferdinand Abell, George Chauncey
- President: Charles Byrne
- Managers: John Montgomery Ward

The 1892 Brooklyn Grooms season was a season in American baseball. The team finished the first half of the split season in second place, just 2.5 games behind the Boston Beaneaters. However, they faded in the second half, finishing 9.5 games behind the second-half champion Cleveland Spiders and missing out on the postseason playoff. Their combined record was 95–59, third best overall in the league.

The season was a tragic one, as outfielder Hub Collins left a game on May 14 because he was feeling ill. A week later he was dead, the victim of typhoid fever. The team put on a benefit game to raise money for his widow on May 29. One bright spot, however, was first baseman Dan Brouthers, who won the batting title with a .335 batting average.

== Regular season ==
=== Season standings ===
National League
Team	W	L	Pct.	GB	Home	Road
Boston Beaneaters	102	48	.680	—	54‍–‍21	48‍–‍27
Cleveland Spiders	93	56	.624	8½	54‍–‍24	39‍–‍32
Brooklyn Grooms	95	59	.617	9	51‍–‍24	44‍–‍35
Philadelphia Phillies	87	66	.569	16½	55‍–‍26	32‍–‍40
Cincinnati Reds	82	68	.547	20	45‍–‍32	37‍–‍36
Pittsburgh Pirates	80	73	.523	23½	54‍–‍34	26‍–‍39
Chicago Colts	70	76	.479	30	36‍–‍31	34‍–‍45
New York Giants	71	80	.470	31½	42‍–‍36	29‍–‍44
Louisville Colonels	63	89	.414	40	37‍–‍31	26‍–‍58
Washington Senators	58	93	.384	44½	34‍–‍36	24‍–‍57
St. Louis Browns	56	94	.373	46	37‍–‍36	19‍–‍58
Baltimore Orioles	46	101	.313	54½	29‍–‍44	17‍–‍57

National League First-half standings	W	L	Pct.	GB
Boston Beaneaters	52	22	.703	—
Brooklyn Grooms	51	26	.662	2 1/2
Philadelphia Phillies	46	30	.605	7
Cincinnati Reds	44	31	.587	8 1/2
Cleveland Spiders	40	33	.548	11 1/2
Pittsburgh Pirates	37	39	.487	16
Washington Senators	35	41	.461	18
Chicago Colts	31	39	.443	19
St. Louis Browns	31	42	.425	20 1/2
New York Giants	31	43	.419	21
Louisville Colonels	30	47	.390	23 1/2
Baltimore Orioles	20	55	.267	32 1/2

National League Second-half standings	W	L	Pct.	GB
Cleveland Spiders	53	23	.697	—
Boston Beaneaters	50	26	.658	3
Brooklyn Grooms	44	33	.571	9 1/2
Pittsburgh Pirates	43	34	.558	10 1/2
Philadelphia Phillies	41	36	.532	12 1/2
New York Giants	40	37	.519	13 1/2
Chicago Colts	39	37	.513	14
Cincinnati Reds	38	37	.507	14 1/2
Louisville Colonels	33	42	.440	19 1/2
Baltimore Orioles	26	46	.361	25
St. Louis Browns	25	52	.325	28 1/2
Washington Senators	23	52	.307	29 1/2

=== Record vs. opponents ===
1892 National League record Sources:
Team	BAL	BSN	BRO	CHI	CIN	CLE	LOU	NYG	PHI	PIT	STL	WAS
Baltimore	—	0–13	2–12–1	4–7	4–10	2–11–2	6–7	5–9	4–10	5–9	8–6–1	6–7–1
Boston	13–0	—	9–5	10–4	8–5–1	8–6	12–2	11–3–1	6–7	7–6	7–7	11–3
Brooklyn	12–2–1	5–9	—	10–4	6–8	8–6	9–5	7–7	9–5–2	10–4	9–5–1	10–4
Chicago	7–4	4–10	4–10	—	6–7–1	3–9	5–9	10–4	5–9	7–7	7–5	12–2
Cincinnati	10–4	5–8–1	8–6	7–6–1	—	5–9	7–6–1	8–6	5–9	5–9	12–2–1	10–3–1
Cleveland	11–2–2	6–8	6–8	9–3	9–5	—	13–1	8–5	10–4	7–7–1	8–5–1	6–8
Louisville	7–6	2–12	5–9	9–5	6–7–1	1–13	—	4–10	4–10	8–6	9–5–1	8–6
New York	9–5	3–11–1	7–7	4–10	6–8	5–8	10–4	—	5–9	4–10–1	9–4	9–4
Philadelphia	10–4	7–6	5–9–2	9–5	9–5	4–10	10–4	9–5	—	8–6	7–7	9–5
Pittsburgh	9–5	6–7	4–10	7–7	9–5	7–7–1	6–8	10–4–1	6–8	—	10–4	6–8
St. Louis	6–8–1	7–7	5–9–1	5–7	2–12–1	5–8–1	5–9–1	4–9	7–7	4–10	—	6–8
Washington	7–6–1	3–11	4–10	2–12	3–10–1	8–6	6–8	4–9	5–9	8–6	8–6	—

=== Roster ===
1892 Brooklyn Grooms
Roster
Pitchers: George Haddock; Bill Hart; Bert Inks; Brickyard Kennedy; Ed Stein	Catchers: Con Daily; Tom Kinslow; Infielders: Dan Brouthers; Tommy Corcoran; Tom Daly; Bill Joyce; John Ward	Outfielders: Oyster Burns; Hub Collins; Dave Foutz; Mike Griffin; Darby O'Brien	Manager: John Ward

== Player stats ==
=== Batting ===
==== Starters by position ====
Note: Pos = Position; G = Games played; AB = At bats; R = Runs; H = Hits; Avg. = Batting average; HR = Home runs; RBI = Runs batted in; SB = Stolen bases

Pos	Player	G	AB	R	H	Avg.	HR	RBI	SB
C	Con Daily	80	278	38	65	.234	0	28	18
1B	Dan Brouthers	152	588	121	197	.335	5	124	31
2B	John Ward	148	614	109	163	.265	1	47	88
3B	Bill Joyce	97	372	89	91	.245	6	45	23
SS	Tommy Corcoran	151	613	77	145	.237	1	74	39
OF	Oyster Burns	141	542	88	171	.315	4	96	33
OF	Mike Griffin	129	452	103	125	.277	3	66	49
OF	Darby O'Brien	122	490	72	119	.243	1	56	57

==== Other batters ====
Note: G = Games played; AB = At bats; R = Runs; H = Hits; Avg. = Batting average; HR = Home runs; RBI = Runs batted in; SB = Stolen bases

Player	G	AB	R	H	Avg.	HR	RBI	SB
Tom Daly	124	446	76	114	.256	4	51	34
Tom Kinslow	66	246	37	75	.305	2	40	4
Dave Foutz	61	220	33	41	.186	1	26	19
Hub Collins	21	87	17	26	.299	0	17	4

=== Pitching ===
==== Starting pitchers ====
Note: G = Games pitched; IP = Innings pitched; W = Wins; L = Losses; ERA = Earned run average; BB = Bases on balls; SO = Strikeouts; CG = Complete games

Player	G	GS	IP	W	L	ERA	BB	SO	CG
George Haddock	46	44	381.1	29	13	3.14	163	153	39
Ed Stein	48	42	377.1	27	16	2.84	150	190	38
Dave Foutz	27	20	203.0	13	8	3.41	63	56	17
Bill Hart	28	23	195.0	9	12	3.28	96	65	16
Brickyard Kennedy	26	21	191.0	13	8	3.86	95	108	18
Bert Inks	9	8	58.0	4	2	3.88	33	25	4
