= 1892 Boston Beaneaters season =

1892 Boston Beaneaters
- World Series champions National League champions
- League: National League
- Ballpark: South End Grounds
- City: Boston, Massachusetts
- Record: 1st half: 52–22 (.703); 2nd half: 50–26 (.658); Overall: 102–48 (.680)
- League place: 1st half: 1st; 2nd half: 2nd (3 GB)
- Owner: Arthur Soden
- Manager: Frank Selee (3rd season)

The 1892 Boston Beaneaters season was the 22nd season of the franchise. The Beaneaters won their second straight and fifth overall National League pennant. In the league's first split season, the Beaneaters finished first in the first half, and three games behind the Cleveland Spiders in the second half. After the season, the two teams played a "World's Championship Series", which the Beaneaters won, five games to none (with one tie). The National League did not play another split season until 1981.

== Regular season ==
=== Season standings ===
National League
Team	W	L	Pct.	GB	Home	Road
Boston Beaneaters	102	48	.680	—	54‍–‍21	48‍–‍27
Cleveland Spiders	93	56	.624	8½	54‍–‍24	39‍–‍32
Brooklyn Grooms	95	59	.617	9	51‍–‍24	44‍–‍35
Philadelphia Phillies	87	66	.569	16½	55‍–‍26	32‍–‍40
Cincinnati Reds	82	68	.547	20	45‍–‍32	37‍–‍36
Pittsburgh Pirates	80	73	.523	23½	54‍–‍34	26‍–‍39
Chicago Colts	70	76	.479	30	36‍–‍31	34‍–‍45
New York Giants	71	80	.470	31½	42‍–‍36	29‍–‍44
Louisville Colonels	63	89	.414	40	37‍–‍31	26‍–‍58
Washington Senators	58	93	.384	44½	34‍–‍36	24‍–‍57
St. Louis Browns	56	94	.373	46	37‍–‍36	19‍–‍58
Baltimore Orioles	46	101	.313	54½	29‍–‍44	17‍–‍57

National League First-half standings	W	L	Pct.	GB
Boston Beaneaters	52	22	.703	—
Brooklyn Grooms	51	26	.662	2½
Philadelphia Phillies	46	30	.605	7
Cincinnati Reds	44	31	.587	8½
Cleveland Spiders	40	33	.548	11½
Pittsburgh Pirates	37	39	.487	16
Washington Senators	35	41	.461	18
Chicago Colts	31	39	.443	19
St. Louis Browns	31	42	.425	20½
New York Giants	31	43	.419	21
Louisville Colonels	30	47	.390	23½
Baltimore Orioles	20	55	.267	32½

National League Second-half standings	W	L	Pct.	GB
Cleveland Spiders	53	23	.697	—
Boston Beaneaters	50	26	.658	3
Brooklyn Grooms	44	33	.571	9½
Pittsburgh Pirates	43	34	.558	10½
Philadelphia Phillies	41	36	.532	12½
New York Giants	40	37	.519	13½
Chicago Colts	39	37	.513	14
Cincinnati Reds	38	37	.507	14½
Louisville Colonels	33	42	.440	19½
Baltimore Orioles	26	46	.361	25
St. Louis Browns	25	52	.325	28½
Washington Senators	23	52	.307	29½

=== Record vs. opponents ===
1892 National League record Sources:
Team	BAL	BSN	BRO	CHI	CIN	CLE	LOU	NYG	PHI	PIT	STL	WAS
Baltimore	—	0–13	2–12–1	4–7	4–10	2–11–2	6–7	5–9	4–10	5–9	8–6–1	6–7–1
Boston	13–0	—	9–5	10–4	8–5–1	8–6	12–2	11–3–1	6–7	7–6	7–7	11–3
Brooklyn	12–2–1	5–9	—	10–4	6–8	8–6	9–5	7–7	9–5–2	10–4	9–5–1	10–4
Chicago	7–4	4–10	4–10	—	6–7–1	3–9	5–9	10–4	5–9	7–7	7–5	12–2
Cincinnati	10–4	5–8–1	8–6	7–6–1	—	5–9	7–6–1	8–6	5–9	5–9	12–2–1	10–3–1
Cleveland	11–2–2	6–8	6–8	9–3	9–5	—	13–1	8–5	10–4	7–7–1	8–5–1	6–8
Louisville	7–6	2–12	5–9	9–5	6–7–1	1–13	—	4–10	4–10	8–6	9–5–1	8–6
New York	9–5	3–11–1	7–7	4–10	6–8	5–8	10–4	—	5–9	4–10–1	9–4	9–4
Philadelphia	10–4	7–6	5–9–2	9–5	9–5	4–10	10–4	9–5	—	8–6	7–7	9–5
Pittsburgh	9–5	6–7	4–10	7–7	9–5	7–7–1	6–8	10–4–1	6–8	—	10–4	6–8
St. Louis	6–8–1	7–7	5–9–1	5–7	2–12–1	5–8–1	5–9–1	4–9	7–7	4–10	—	6–8
Washington	7–6–1	3–11	4–10	2–12	3–10–1	8–6	6–8	4–9	5–9	8–6	8–6	—

=== Roster ===
1892 Boston Beaneaters
Roster
Pitchers: Dad Clarkson; John Clarkson; Kid Nichols; Harry Staley; Jack Stivetts; Lee Viau	Catchers: Charlie Bennett; Dan Burke; Joe Daly; Charlie Ganzel; King Kelly; Infielders: Herman Long; Billy Nash; Joe Quinn; Tommy Tucker	Outfielders: Hugh Duffy; Bobby Lowe; Tommy McCarthy; Harry Stovey	Manager: Frank Selee

== Player stats ==
=== Batting ===
==== Starters by position ====
Note: Pos = Position; G = Games played; AB = At bats; H = Hits; Avg. = Batting average; HR = Home runs; RBI = Runs batted in

Pos	Player	G	AB	H	Avg.	HR	RBI
C	King Kelly	78	281	53	.189	2	41
1B	Tommy Tucker	149	542	153	.282	1	62
2B	Joe Quinn	143	532	116	.218	1	59
SS	Herman Long	151	646	181	.280	6	78
3B	Billy Nash	135	526	137	.260	4	95
OF	Hugh Duffy	147	612	184	.301	5	81
OF	Bobby Lowe	124	475	115	.242	3	57
OF	Tommy McCarthy	152	603	146	.242	4	63

==== Other batters ====
Note: G = Games played; AB = At bats; H = Hits; Avg. = Batting average; HR = Home runs; RBI = Runs batted in

Player	G	AB	H	Avg.	HR	RBI
Charlie Ganzel	54	198	53	.268	0	25
Harry Stovey	38	146	24	.164	0	12
Charlie Bennett	35	114	23	.202	1	16
Dan Burke	1	4	0	.000	0	0
Joe Daly	1	0	0	----	0	0

=== Pitching ===
==== Starting pitchers ====
Note: G = Games pitched; IP = Innings pitched; W = Wins; L = Losses; ERA = Earned run average; SO = Strikeouts

Player	G	IP	W	L	ERA	SO
Kid Nichols	53	453.0	35	16	2.84	192
Jack Stivetts	54	415.2	35	16	3.03	180
Harry Staley	37	299.2	22	10	3.03	93
John Clarkson	16	145.2	8	6	2.35	48
Lee Viau	1	9.0	1	0	0.00	1
Dad Clarkson	1	7.0	1	0	1.29	0

==== Relief pitchers ====
Note: G = Games pitched; W = Wins; L = Losses; SV = Saves; ERA = Earned run average; SO = Strikeouts

Player	G	W	L	SV	ERA	SO
King Kelly	1	0	0	0	1.50	0

== World's Championship Series ==
The Boston Beaneaters, first-half champions, played the second-half champion Cleveland Spiders in a best-of-nine postseason series. After a 0–0 tie in the opener, called on account of darkness after 11 innings, Boston defeated Cleveland five games in a row for a sweep. Hall of Famer Hugh Duffy batted .462 with nine runs batted in and six extra-base hits including a home run.
