= 1892 Cleveland Spiders season =

1892 Cleveland Spiders
- League: National League
- Ballpark: League Park
- City: Cleveland, Ohio
- Record: 1st half: 40–33 (.548); 2nd half: 53–23 (.697); Overall: 93–56 (.624)
- League place: 1st half: 5th (11 1/2 GB); 2nd half: 1st
- Owner: Frank Robison
- Manager: Patsy Tebeau

The 1892 Cleveland Spiders, led by star pitcher Cy Young, finished with a 93–56 overall record, second-best in the National League. In the first split season in Major League Baseball history, the Spiders finished in fifth place during the first half of the season, and in first place during the second half. After the season, they played against the first-half champions, the Boston Beaneaters, in the "World's Championship Series", which the Spiders lost, five games to none (with one tie).

== Regular season ==
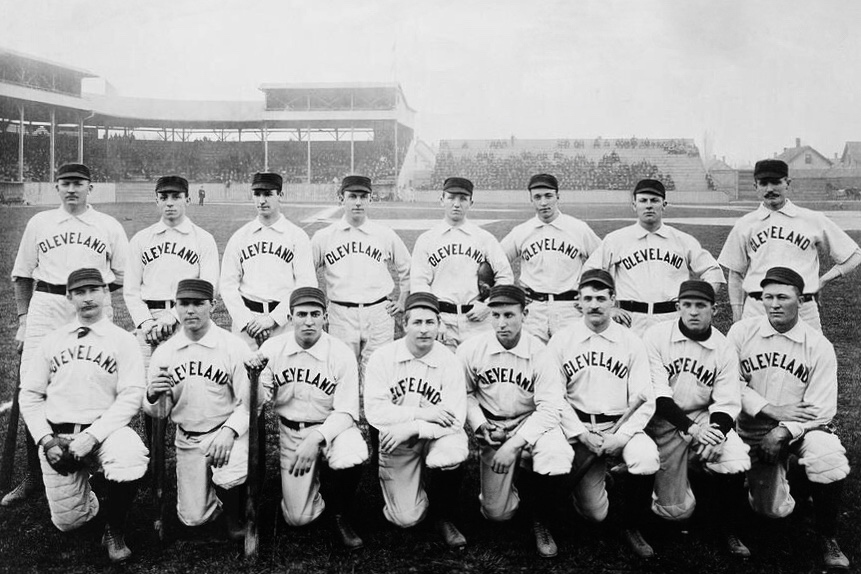
1892 Cleveland Spiders

=== Season standings ===
National League
Team	W	L	Pct.	GB	Home	Road
Boston Beaneaters	102	48	.680	—	54‍–‍21	48‍–‍27
Cleveland Spiders	93	56	.624	8½	54‍–‍24	39‍–‍32
Brooklyn Grooms	95	59	.617	9	51‍–‍24	44‍–‍35
Philadelphia Phillies	87	66	.569	16½	55‍–‍26	32‍–‍40
Cincinnati Reds	82	68	.547	20	45‍–‍32	37‍–‍36
Pittsburgh Pirates	80	73	.523	23½	54‍–‍34	26‍–‍39
Chicago Colts	70	76	.479	30	36‍–‍31	34‍–‍45
New York Giants	71	80	.470	31½	42‍–‍36	29‍–‍44
Louisville Colonels	63	89	.414	40	37‍–‍31	26‍–‍58
Washington Senators	58	93	.384	44½	34‍–‍36	24‍–‍57
St. Louis Browns	56	94	.373	46	37‍–‍36	19‍–‍58
Baltimore Orioles	46	101	.313	54½	29‍–‍44	17‍–‍57

National League First-half standings	W	L	Pct.	GB
Boston Beaneaters	52	22	.703	—
Brooklyn Grooms	51	26	.662	2½
Philadelphia Phillies	46	30	.605	7
Cincinnati Reds	44	31	.587	8½
Cleveland Spiders	40	33	.548	11½
Pittsburgh Pirates	37	39	.487	16
Washington Senators	35	41	.461	18
Chicago Colts	31	39	.443	19
St. Louis Browns	31	42	.425	20½
New York Giants	31	43	.419	21
Louisville Colonels	30	47	.390	23½
Baltimore Orioles	20	55	.267	32½

National League Second-half standings	W	L	Pct.	GB
Cleveland Spiders	53	23	.697	—
Boston Beaneaters	50	26	.658	3
Brooklyn Grooms	44	33	.571	9½
Pittsburgh Pirates	43	34	.558	10½
Philadelphia Phillies	41	36	.532	12½
New York Giants	40	37	.519	13½
Chicago Colts	39	37	.513	14
Cincinnati Reds	38	37	.507	14½
Louisville Colonels	33	42	.440	19½
Baltimore Orioles	26	46	.361	25
St. Louis Browns	25	52	.325	28½
Washington Senators	23	52	.307	29½

=== Record vs. opponents ===
1892 National League record Sources:
Team	BAL	BSN	BRO	CHI	CIN	CLE	LOU	NYG	PHI	PIT	STL	WAS
Baltimore	—	0–13	2–12–1	4–7	4–10	2–11–2	6–7	5–9	4–10	5–9	8–6–1	6–7–1
Boston	13–0	—	9–5	10–4	8–5–1	8–6	12–2	11–3–1	6–7	7–6	7–7	11–3
Brooklyn	12–2–1	5–9	—	10–4	6–8	8–6	9–5	7–7	9–5–2	10–4	9–5–1	10–4
Chicago	7–4	4–10	4–10	—	6–7–1	3–9	5–9	10–4	5–9	7–7	7–5	12–2
Cincinnati	10–4	5–8–1	8–6	7–6–1	—	5–9	7–6–1	8–6	5–9	5–9	12–2–1	10–3–1
Cleveland	11–2–2	6–8	6–8	9–3	9–5	—	13–1	8–5	10–4	7–7–1	8–5–1	6–8
Louisville	7–6	2–12	5–9	9–5	6–7–1	1–13	—	4–10	4–10	8–6	9–5–1	8–6
New York	9–5	3–11–1	7–7	4–10	6–8	5–8	10–4	—	5–9	4–10–1	9–4	9–4
Philadelphia	10–4	7–6	5–9–2	9–5	9–5	4–10	10–4	9–5	—	8–6	7–7	9–5
Pittsburgh	9–5	6–7	4–10	7–7	9–5	7–7–1	6–8	10–4–1	6–8	—	10–4	6–8
St. Louis	6–8–1	7–7	5–9–1	5–7	2–12–1	5–8–1	5–9–1	4–9	7–7	4–10	—	6–8
Washington	7–6–1	3–11	4–10	2–12	3–10–1	8–6	6–8	4–9	5–9	8–6	8–6	—

=== Roster ===
1892 Cleveland Spiders
Roster
Pitchers: John Clarkson; George Cuppy; George Davies; George Rettger; Lee Viau; Tom Williams; Cy Young	Catchers: Chief Zimmer; Infielders: Cupid Childs; George Davis; Ed McKean; Patsy Tebeau; Jake Virtue	Outfielders: Jesse Burkett; Jack Doyle; Jimmy McAleer; Jack O'Connor	Manager: Patsy Tebeau

== Player stats ==
=== Batting ===
==== Starters by position ====
Note: Pos = Position; G = Games played; AB = At bats; H = Hits; Avg. = Batting average; HR = Home runs; RBI = Runs batted in

Pos	Player	G	AB	H	Avg.	HR	RBI
C	Chief Zimmer	111	413	109	.264	1	64
1B	Jake Virtue	147	557	157	.282	2	89
2B	Cupid Childs	145	558	177	.317	3	53
SS	Ed McKean	129	531	139	.262	0	93
3B	George Davis	144	597	144	.241	5	82
OF	Jimmy McAleer	149	571	136	.238	4	70
OF	Jesse Burkett	145	608	167	.275	6	66
OF	Jack O'Connor	140	572	142	.248	1	58

==== Other batters ====
Note: G = Games played; AB = At bats; H = Hits; Avg. = Batting average; HR = Home runs; RBI = Runs batted in

Player	G	AB	H	Avg.	HR	RBI
Patsy Tebeau	86	340	83	.244	2	49
Jack Doyle	24	88	26	.295	1	14

=== Pitching ===
==== Starting pitchers ====
Note: G = Games pitched; IP = Innings pitched; W = Wins; L = Losses; ERA = Earned run average; SO = Strikeouts

Player	G	IP	W	L	ERA	SO
Cy Young	53	453.0	36	12	1.93	168
George Cuppy	47	376.0	28	13	2.51	103
John Clarkson	29	243.1	17	10	2.55	91
George Davies	26	215.2	10	16	2.59	95
George Rettger	6	38.0	1	3	4.26	12
Lee Viau	1	1.0	0	1	36.00	0

==== Other pitchers ====
Note: G = Games pitched; IP = Innings pitched; W = Wins; L = Losses; ERA = Earned run average; SO = Strikeouts

Player	G	IP	W	L	ERA	SO
Tom Williams	2	9.0	1	0	3.00	3
