= Dan Daub =

American baseball player (1868–1951)

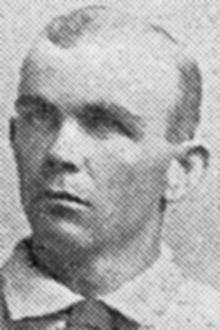
- Pitcher
- Born: January 12, 1868; Middletown, Ohio, U.S.
- Died: March 25, 1951 (aged 83); Bradenton, Florida, U.S.
- Batted: Right Threw: Right

MLB debut
- August 31, 1892, for the Cincinnati Reds

Last MLB appearance
- July 1, 1897, for the Brooklyn Bridegrooms

MLB statistics
- Win–loss record: 45–52
- Earned run average: 4.75
- Strikeouts: 185
- Stats at Baseball Reference

Teams
- Cincinnati Reds (1892); Brooklyn Grooms/Bridegrooms (1893–1897)

Daniel William Daub (January 12, 1868 – March 25, 1951) was a 19th-century American Major League Baseball pitcher born in Middletown, Ohio. After attending and playing baseball for Denison University, he played for the Cincinnati Reds in 1892 and with the Brooklyn Grooms/Bridegrooms from 1893 through 1897.

The New York Times reported on December 22, 1895, that Dan was among approximately 20 men who stoned and fired shotguns, also known as whitecapping, upon the home of Mrs. Wescoe of Hamilton, Ohio. Daub, who passes his winters in Mintonville, Ohio, was also among those that had warrants issued for his arrest.

After his playing career was over, Dan became the coach of the Ohio Wesleyan University baseball team, a post he held for the 1902 season, then he resigned before the following season. His replacement was a ballplayer named Branch Rickey, who was recently ruled ineligible to play college ball due to his prior professional baseball career. Daub died at the age of 83 in Bradenton, Florida, and is interred at Hickory Flats Cemetery in Overpeck, Ohio.
