= Harry Dooms =

American baseball player (1867–1899)

- Outfielder
- Born: January 30, 1867; St. Louis, Missouri, U.S.
- Died: December 14, 1899 (aged 32); St. Louis, Missouri, U.S.
- Batted: Left Threw: Unknown

MLB debut
- August 7, 1892, for the Louisville Colonels

Last MLB appearance
- August 7, 1892, for the Louisville Colonels

MLB statistics
- Batting average: .000
- Home runs: 0
- Runs batted in: 0
- Stats at Baseball Reference

Teams
- Louisville Colonels (1892)

Henry E. Dooms (January 30, 1867 – December 14, 1899), also nicknamed "Jack", was an American baseball outfielder. He made one Major League Baseball (MLB) appearance for the Louisville Colonels in 1892.

== Sources ==
- Career statistics from Baseball Reference · Retrosheet · Baseball Almanac
