= Dan Mahoney (baseball) =

American baseball player (1864–1904)

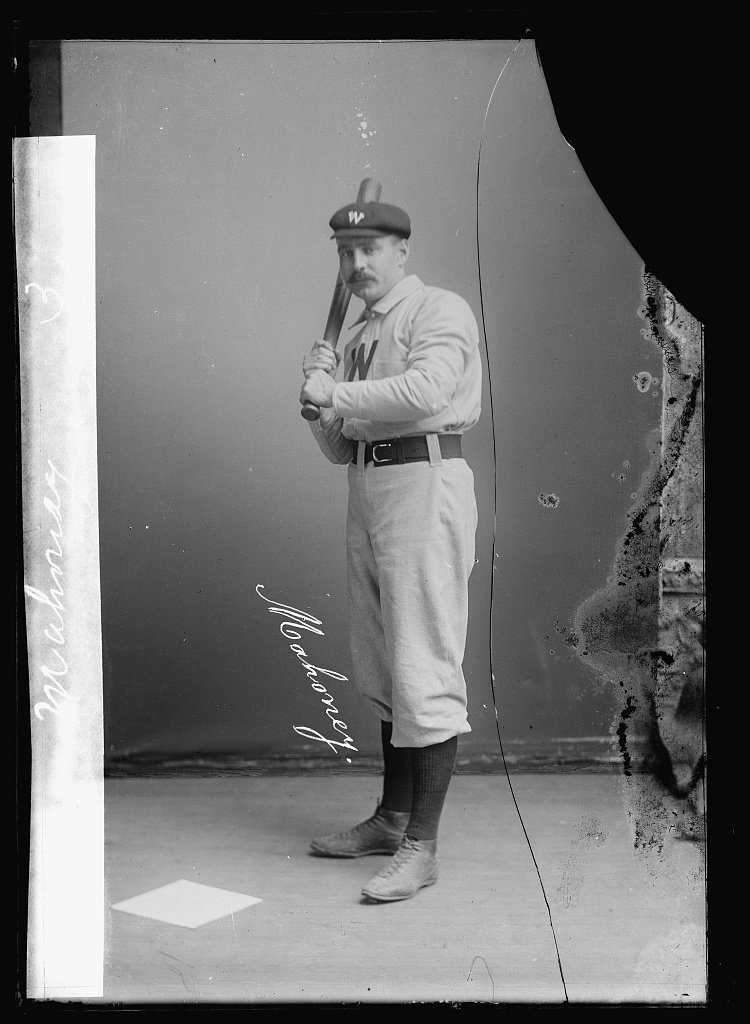
- Mahoney in Washington Senators uniform
- Catcher
- Born: March 20, 1864; Springfield, Massachusetts, U.S.
- Died: January 31, 1904 (aged 39); Springfield, Massachusetts, U.S.
- Batted: Right Threw: Right

MLB debut
- August 20, 1892, for the Cincinnati Reds

Last MLB appearance
- July 30, 1895, for the Washington Senators

MLB statistics
- Batting average: .182
- Home runs: 0
- Runs batted in: 2
- Stats at Baseball Reference

Teams
- Cincinnati Reds (1892); Washington Senators (1895)

Daniel J. Mahoney (March 20, 1864 – January 31, 1904) was an American professional baseball catcher. He played in the Major Leagues in 1892 and 1895 for the Cincinnati Reds and Washington Senators.

== Death ==
On January 31, 1904, Mahoney committed suicide by drinking carbolic acid in Springfield, Massachusetts. He was 39 years old.
