= Harry DeMiller =

American baseball player (1867–1928)

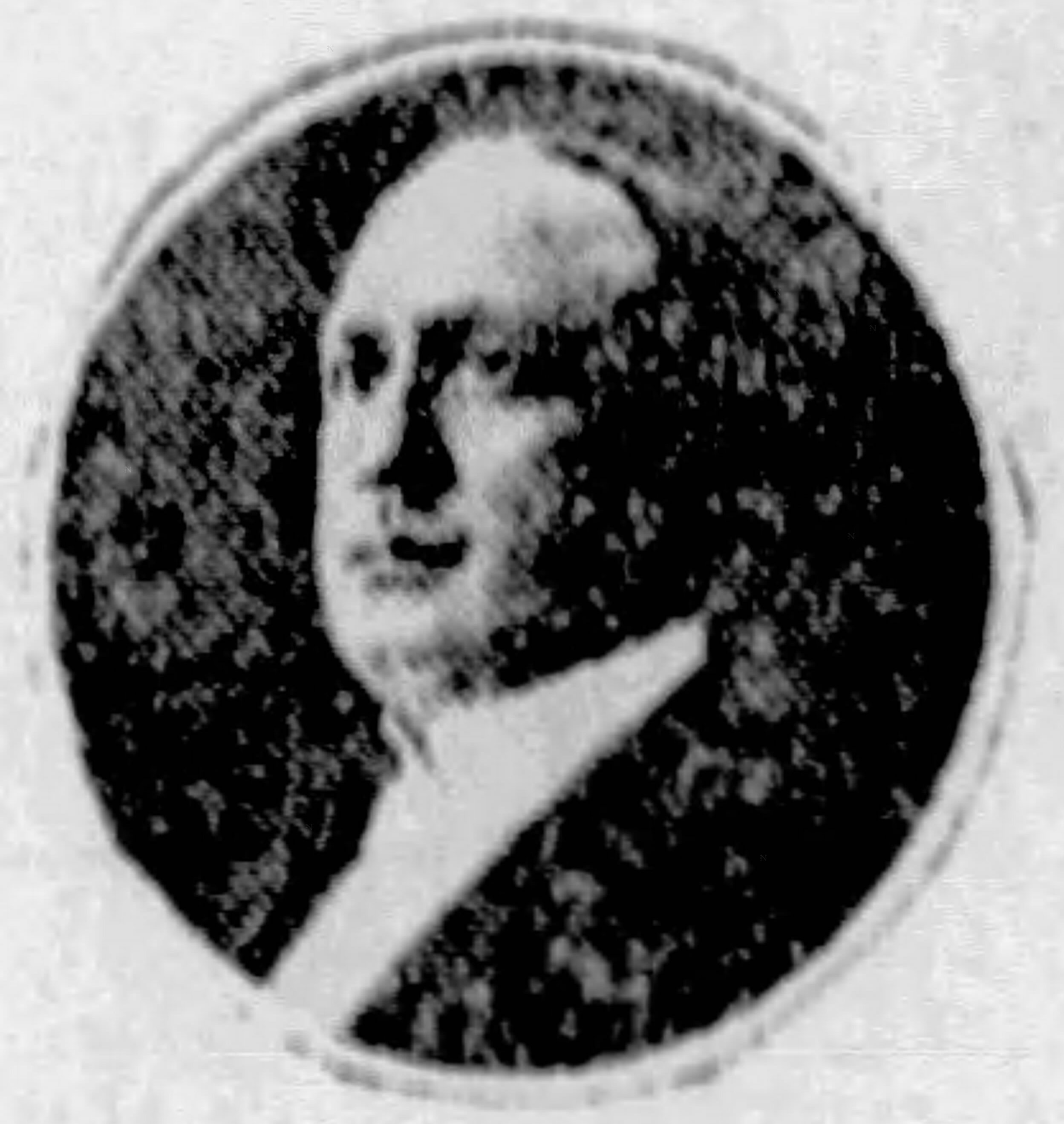
- DeMiller, c. 1911
- Pitcher
- Born: November 12, 1867; Wooster, Ohio
- Died: October 19, 1928 (aged 60); Santa Ana, California
- Batted: Right Threw: Left

MLB debut
- August 20, 1892, for the Chicago Colts

Last MLB appearance
- October 6, 1892, for the Chicago Colts

MLB statistics
- Win–loss record: 1–1
- Strikeouts: 15
- Earned run average: 6.38
- Stats at Baseball Reference

Teams
- Chicago Colts (1892)

Harry DeMiller (November 12, 1867 – October 19, 1928), was a professional baseball player who played pitcher in the Major Leagues for the 1892 Chicago Colts.

In May 1911, he was appointed chief of police for the city of Joliet, Illinois.
