= Jerry Connors =

American baseball player

- Outfielder
- Born: August 24, 1870; Cleveland, Ohio, U.S.
- Died: August 12, 1910 (aged 39); Cleveland, Ohio, U.S.

MLB debut
- July 11, 1892, for the Philadelphia Phillies

Last MLB appearance
- July 11, 1892, for the Philadelphia Phillies

MLB statistics
- Batting average: .000
- Home runs: 0
- Runs batted in: 0
- Stats at Baseball Reference

Teams
- Philadelphia Phillies (1892)

Jeremiah H. Connors or O'Connors (August 24, 1870 – August 12, 1910) was an American outfielder in Major League Baseball. He played one game for the Philadelphia Phillies in 1892.
