= George Gore =

American baseball player (1854–1933)

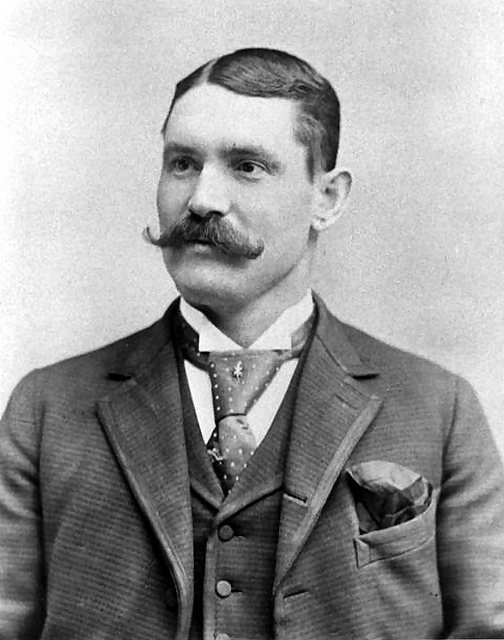
- Center fielder
- Born: May 3, 1854; Saccarappa, Maine, U.S.
- Died: September 16, 1933 (aged 79); Utica, New York, U.S.
- Batted: Left Threw: Right

MLB debut
- May 1, 1879, for the Chicago White Stockings

Last MLB appearance
- August 18, 1892, for the St. Louis Browns

MLB statistics
- Batting average: .301
- Home runs: 46
- Runs batted in: 618
- Stats at Baseball Reference
- Managerial record at Baseball Reference

Teams
- As player: Chicago White Stockings (1879–1886); New York Giants (1887–1889); New York Giants (PL) (1890); New York Giants (1891–1892); St. Louis Browns (1892); As manager: St. Louis Browns (1892)

Career highlights and awards
- NL batting champion (1880)

George F. Gore (May 3, 1854 – September 16, 1933), nicknamed "Piano Legs", was an American center fielder in Major League Baseball who played for 14 seasons, eight for the Chicago White Stockings, five for the New York Giants, one for the St. Louis Browns (1892) of the National League (NL), and the New York Giants of the Players' League (1890).

Born in Saccarappa, Maine, Gore led the NL in several seasonal offensive categories. He won his only batting title in 1880 while playing for Chicago, along with league leading totals in on-base percentage and slugging percentage. He also led the league twice in runs scored, bases on balls three times, and games played by a center fielder once. Gore was also the all-time leader for most errors by major league outfielder upon his retirement with 368 total, including a record 346 errors in the National League, records he still holds today. (He made 217 errors for Chicago; 122 for New York; and seven for St. Louis, all National League teams; and 22 for the New York Giants of the Players' League.)

Gore played for many successful teams throughout his career. During his eight seasons with the White Stockings, they won the league title five times, including appearances in two World Series. Chicago played the St. Louis Browns in both 1885, which ended in a series tie, and 1886, with St. Louis winning the championship. He was also a member of the New York Giants' two National League championship teams in 1888 and 1889. Both Giants teams went on to claim World Series victories, against the St. Louis Browns in 1888, and the Brooklyn Bridegrooms in 1889.

Twice he set single-game records, one for stealing seven bases, and the other for collecting five extra-base hits. Although he had statistics that put him consistently among the seasonal league leaders, he reportedly had a poor work ethic resulting from an active social life outside of baseball. This behavior did not endear him to his team captain, Cap Anson, which caused them to feud during Gore's time in Chicago. After his career, he had major financial difficulties, having to move from job to job just to support his bare necessities. He died at the age of 79 in Utica, New York.

== Early life ==
Officially born in Saccarappa, Maine (although it is also claimed he was born in Hartland, Maine), Gore was born into a poor, country family. As a young man, he grew up playing baseball in and around his hometown of Hartland. While working for, and playing for the S.D. Warren Paper Mill in Westbrook, Maine, his skills caught the attention of pro scouts and in 1877 he signed a contract with a team in Fall River, Massachusetts of the New England League. He showed up to his first professional baseball tryout without shoes.

The following year, he played for the New Bedford Whalers, batted .324 and helped the team win the New England championship. Scouts from seven major league teams were vying for his services, but it was when he was playing in an exhibition game against Anson's Chicago White Stockings team that he got his opportunity to sign a major league contract. After the game, White Stockings owner Albert Spalding offered him a contract to play for his team, and Gore signed. Spalding offered him $1,200 a season, and although Gore originally asked for $2,500, they eventually compromised on $1,900.

== Baseball career ==
=== Chicago ===
He made his major league debut with Chicago on May 1, 1879. He played in 63 games that first season as the club's starting center fielder and batted .263. Gore excelled during his second season with Chicago, leading the league with a .360 batting average, as well as a .399 on-base percentage, and .463 slugging percentage. Additionally, he finished in the top five among league leaders in runs scored, hits, doubles, runs batted in (RBIs), bases on balls and singles.

In 1881 and 1882, Gore continued his hitting success, as he finished in the top 10 in multiple offensive categories. He led the league in runs scored both seasons, and walks in 1882. On June 25, 1881, he became the first known player to record at least seven stolen bases in one game when the Chicago Tribune noted that Gore stole second base five times and third base three times. It considered the all-time record even though at the time stolen bases were not recorded as an official statistic. This feat has only been equaled by Billy Hamilton, who also stole seven bases on August 31, 1894.

The White Stockings failed to finish the 1883 season in first place, after having captured league titles the previous three years. Gore's production did not decline despite his team's sinking performance as he was again among the top players in several offensive categories over the next two seasons, including a league-leading 61 walks in 1884.

In 1885 and 1886 the White Stockings returned to the top of the NL. Gore's offensive production continued at a high level, again among league leaders in several categories. On July 9, 1885, in a game against the Providence Grays and their pitcher Charles Radbourn, he gathered five extra-base hits, three doubles and two triples. He is the first player to accomplish this feat, which has since been equalled many times, but never surpassed. After the 1885 season, Chicago played the St. Louis Browns, the American Association (AA) champion, in a best-of-seven series of exhibition games known as the "World Series." The series ended with Chicago and St. Louis each winning three games, and one game ending in a tie. After the tie game, Gore was suspended for drunkenness and indifference, and was replaced for the rest of the series by Billy Sunday. Sunday later converted to Christianity and became a well-known evangelist. In 1886, Gore established career highs in bases on balls with 102 (the first player to reach 100 walks in a season), which also led the NL, and runs scored with 150, while the White Stockings again finished in first place. Following the season, the White Stockings again played the St. Louis Browns in another exhibition "World Series." St. Louis won the series, four games to two.

==== Aftermath of the 1886 World Series ====
In the aftermath of the St. Louis series, there were not only charges of drunkenness among many of the players, but also allegations that players intentionally lost games for money, known then as "hippodroming". King Kelly had the reputation as being the hardest drinker, as well as the having the most active social life, which management tolerated due to his stellar play. However, that meant instilling discipline in the other players, who used Kelly as an example, was extremely difficult. On November 24, 1886, Gore was the first to go, when he was sold to the New York Giants for approximately $3,500. Writer Henry Chadwick said Gore "cannot play in harmony with Captain and Manager Anson, and Mr. Spalding has wisely released a discontented player whose skill as a fielder, batter, and base runner was offset by his unpleasant relations with the team captain."

Weeks after Gore's contract was sold to the New York Giants, Chicago writer Harry Palmer wrote that whenever Gore "failed to play ball for all he was worth, Anson has reprimanded him." Socially, Palmer added, Anson says "Gore is all right. As an instance of their friendly relations, Anson says Gore applied to him for work this Winter, and the big Chicago captain promised him employment on the toboggan slides at the White Stocking Park whenever he wanted it." In 1888, after seeing him in street clothes during a home game, the New York Star called him "'Budweiser' Gore."

In his 1900 book A Ball Player's Career, Anson said Gore was a good player. Also, "Women and wine brought about his downfall, however, and the last time that I saw him in New York he was broken down, both in heart and pocket, and willing to work at anything that would yield him the bare necessities of life."

=== New York ===
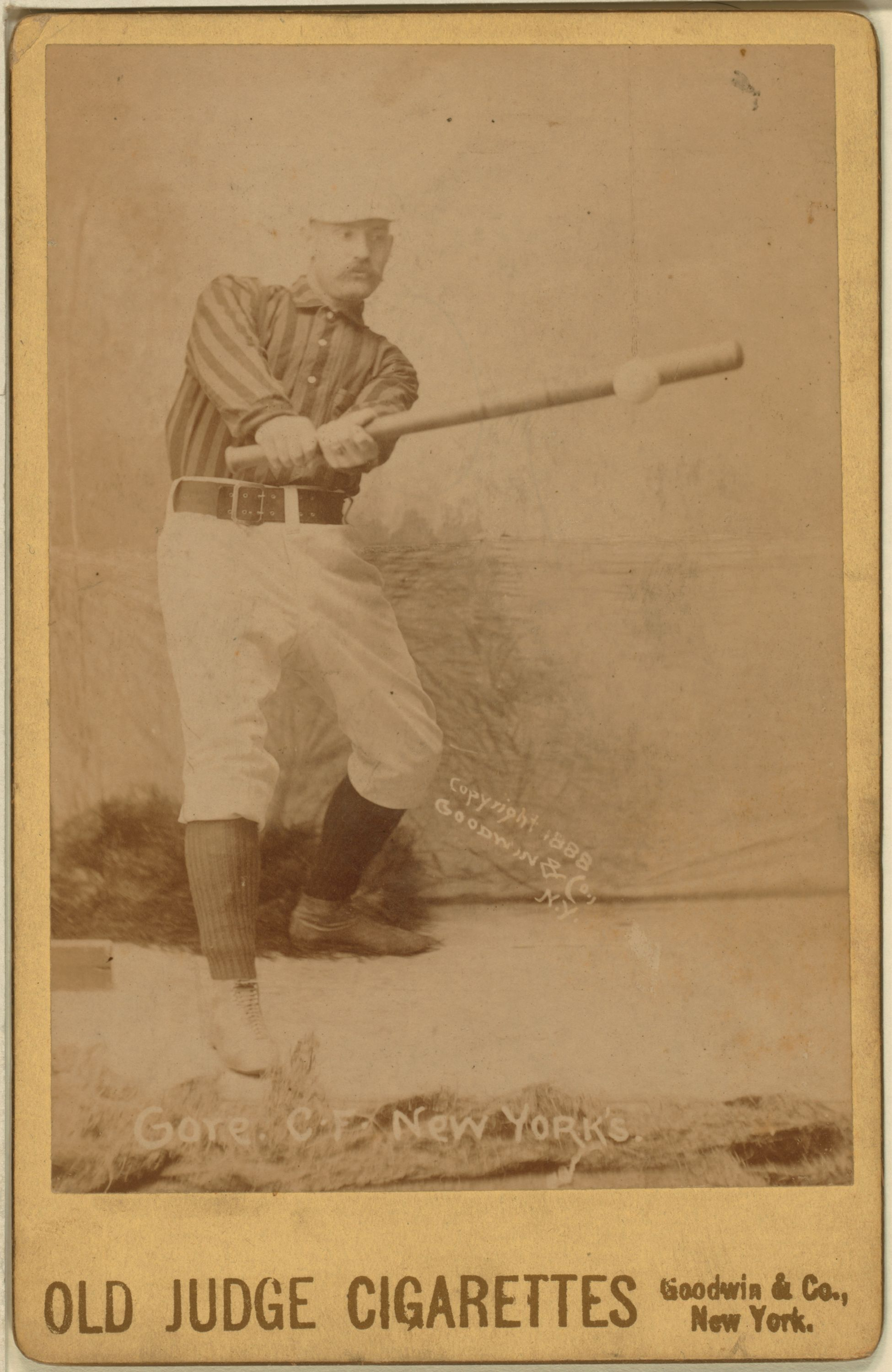
1888 George Gore baseball card

Gore joined a New York Giants team that had a roster that contained no less than six future Baseball Hall of Famers: John Montgomery Ward, Roger Connor, Buck Ewing, Tim Keefe, Mickey Welch, and Jim O'Rourke. Gore took his usual position in center field, replacing O'Rourke, who was the starter the previous season. Gore played well that first season in New York, batting .290 and scoring 95 runs, but the team finished in fourth place in the National League.

For the 1888 season, Gore played in just 64 of the team's 138 games. O'Rourke had reclaimed a starting position, this time in left field, while Gore split his playing time between center and left field. Gore's popularity waned early into the season, so much so that on May 3, New York fans screamed at on-field captain Ewing to play Mike Slattery instead. Gore had already taken his position in left field, but Ewing made the change to Slattery before the game started. New York finished the season as the National League champions, and met the St. Louis Browns in the World Series. Gore appeared in three of the eleven games that were played during this post-season exhibition. New York was declared the victor, winning six games, and Gore contributed five hits in eleven at-bats for a .455 batting average during the series.

Gore regained his starting position in center field for the 1889 season, and his play improved over his 1888 performance. He batted .305, scored 132 runs, and hit seven home runs in 120 games played, although he did commit 41 errors in center field, which led the league. The Giants again finished the season as the champions of the NL, and met the Brooklyn Bridegrooms in the 1889 World Series after the season. New York was again declared the victor after winning six of the nine games exhibition games played. Gore played in five of these games, collecting seven hits in 21 at-bats for a .333 batting average.

==== Players' League ====
After the 1889 season, Gore's teammate, John Montgomery Ward, had organized a new league, the Players' League, and many players were a part of his new union of baseball players called "The Brotherhood". The Players' League began play for the 1890 season, and Gore joined many of his fellow Giants as they joined the new league to play for the New York Giants. Again, Gore split his playing time between left and center field with both Slattery and O'Rourke, but did finish the season appearing in 93 of the team's 132 games, and batted .318 with 132 runs.

==== Return to the Giants ====
Following the 1890 season, the Players' League folded and all the players were allowed to return to their previous teams. Gore returned the Giants along with all of his teammates. In 1891, the Giants did not return to their previous championship status. They finished third among the league's eight teams, with Gore as their starting center fielder, while O'Rourke had moved to left due to the departure of Slattery. Gore batted .284 and scored 103 runs in 130 games played.

=== St. Louis ===
Gore began the 1892 season as the starting center fielder of the Giants, but through an unknown transaction, had moved on to the position of player-manager for the St. Louis Browns of the NL. He began his tenure on August 1, and it ended on August 18, during which time his Browns had a win–loss record of 6–9 in the games he managed. In the 20 games that he played in, his batting average was .205. He soon departed the team, and he never played major league baseball again.

=== Career statistics ===
In 1310 games over 14 seasons, Gore posted a .301 batting average (1612-for-5357) with 1327 runs, 262 doubles, 94 triples, 46 home runs, 618 RBI, 170 stolen bases, 717 bases on balls, .386 on-base percentage and .411 slugging percentage.

== Post-career ==
=== Personal life ===
In 1894, a judge granted a divorce to his wife. Married since 1882, she had accused him of living in 1891 and into 1892 with a Florence "Florilla" Sinclaire "as his wife, and that they [Gore and Sinclaire] lived as man and wife in One Hundred and Twenty-ninth street" in New York City. Gore denied his wife's charge of having had intimate relations with Sinclaire.

=== Death ===
In 1933, months before his death at age 79, Gore told a reporter, "I haven't seen a sick day in seventy-five years, and I feel as good today as I did thirty years ago. I can't get around like I used to, but I still am able to walk three or four miles daily. That keeps me in good shape. I eat three hearty meals a day and my favorite diversion now is playing pinocle. I play it every night. It's great sport for us old-timers." Gore died in Utica, New York at the age of 79, after having lived in Nutley, New Jersey the previous 13 years.

== See also ==
- List of Major League Baseball career runs scored leaders
- List of Major League Baseball batting champions
- List of Major League Baseball annual runs scored leaders
- List of Major League Baseball single-game hits leaders
- List of Major League Baseball stolen base records
- List of Major League Baseball player-managers
