= Split season =

Schedule format for sports leagues

A split season is a schedule format implemented in a variety of sports leagues. The season is divided into two parts, with the winners of both halves playing each other at the end for the overall championship.

Split seasons are usually found in sports with longer seasons, such as baseball, basketball, and association football. They are common in scholastic sports, specifically basketball, in the United States. A number of Minor League Baseball leagues also use split seasons. In Latin America, some association football leagues use a similar format known as Apertura and Clausura.

== Baseball ==
=== Major League Baseball ===
Major League Baseball has used split seasons twice in its history.

==== 1892 ====
In 1892, the National League decided to split its season in an attempt to increase interest, following the collapse of the rival American Association.

The Boston Beaneaters won the first half of the season, while the Cleveland Spiders took the second half. Boston defeated Cleveland 5 games to 0, with one tie, in the championship series.

==== 1981 ====
In 1981, the Major League season was interrupted by a players' strike. Due to the two-month strike, the owners tried to create an equitable solution. So on August 6, the owners decided to split the 1981 season into two halves, with the first-place teams from each half in each division (or a wild card team if the same club won both halves) meeting in a best-of-five divisional playoff series. The four survivors would then move on to the two best-of-five League Championship Series. The extra round of postseason playoffs were won by the Yankees, Athletics, Expos, and Dodgers.

=== Minor leagues ===
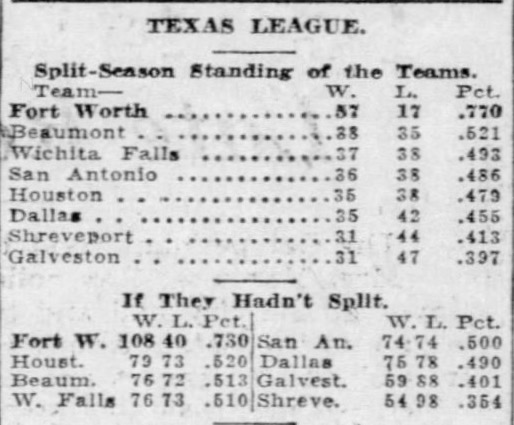
Standings of the Texas League as published in September 1924

In Minor League Baseball, split seasons have been used at several levels. As of 2023, the following minor leagues employ a split-season format:

- Triple-A: International League, Pacific Coast League
- High-A: Northwest League

Prior to the reorganization of 2021, the minor leagues using split seasons were:

- Double-A: Southern League, Texas League
- Class A-Advanced: California League, Carolina League, Florida State League
- Class A: Midwest League, South Atlantic League

Among independent minor leagues, the Atlantic League and Pacific Association used a split schedule.

If a team should win both halves of a season, most leagues still have a postseason championship series, with that team facing the team with the second-best overall record. Alternately, a team winning both halves can be immediately declared league champion; while historically this was the practice in some leagues, forgoing postseason series is uncommon in contemporary professional baseball.

One reason given for the use of split seasons in the minors is that the purpose of these leagues is different than that of Major League Baseball. These leagues are primarily for the development of players. As such, players may move from level to level at any time during the season. A team with many very good players in the early part of the season may see them promoted, leaving lesser players remaining for the latter part of the season. It also allows teams that played poorly in the first half to continue to play meaningful games later in the season.

=== Negro leagues ===
In Negro league baseball split seasons were common to generate a post-season, with the first half champion playing the second half champion for the league pennant. This method was employed even when a World Series was played.

=== Nippon Professional Baseball ===
NPB's Pacific League (PL) employed a split season format once from 1973 to 1982. The PL hoped that the new format would significantly increase fan interest. The season was divided into two, 65-game halves. The two teams that won each half went on to play each other in a five-game playoff series. The winner of the series was named the PL champion and went on to play the Central League (CL) champion in the Japan Series.

Playoff games under the split-season format were commercially successful and often played to sold out crowds, a rare occurrence during the Pacific League's regular season. The format, however, had several problems and criticisms. It allowed a team with only the third-best winning percentage for the full season to reach the playoffs and the Japan Series. The Seibu Lions' manager during the split-season format's final season, Tatsuro Hirooka, heavily criticized the playoff system for this reason. He believed teams could potentially abuse the format by focusing on the first half alone instead of the full season. Then, once a team became the first-half champion, it could rest players during the second half as their playoff berth had already been guaranteed. Another problem specific to the split-season format is that the playoff series was cancelled if one team won both half seasons. This occurred twice, in the 1976 and 1978 seasons. These issues led to the format being scrapped after ten years.

=== Korea Baseball Organization ===
KBO employed a split season format from 1982 to 1988.

=== Chinese Professional Baseball League ===
In CPBL, split seasons have been used since its establishment in 1990, excluded 1998 and 1999.

==== 1990-1995 ====
The two half-season winners were automatically play in the best-of-seven Taiwan Series; the one with the better full-season record gains home advantage.

If the same team wins both halves, then they were directly crowned as the champion, and the Taiwan Series was not held.

==== 1996-2004 ====
The two half-season winners were automatically play in the best-of-seven Taiwan Series; the one with the better full-season record gains home advantage.

If the same team wins both halves, they still have to play Taiwan Series against the next team with the best full-season record, but as compensation, they start the Taiwan Series with one-win advantage.

==== 2005-2008 ====
The two half-season winners are automatically the number one and two seeds; the one with the better full-season record gains an automatic berth into the Taiwan Series. The other team start their postseason from a best-of-five Playoff Series (first round; having a 2-2-1 format) with home advantage, against the number three seed, Wildcard, awarded to the team with the best full-season record but didn't win either half-season.

If the same team wins both halves, the next two teams with the best full-season record play in the first round; the winner plays in the Taiwan Series.

The team with automatic berth into the Taiwan Series have a 3-2-2 format in 2005 and 2006, a 2-3-2 format in 2007 and 2008.

==== 2009-2021 ====
The two half-season winners were automatically play in the postseason; the one with the better full-season record gains Taiwan Series home advantage.

Due to the team reduction, Wildcard only appear as "both half-season winners don't win the best full-season record".

If the same team wins both halves, the next two teams with the best full-season record play in the 2-2-1 format Playoff Series; the winner plays in the Taiwan Series, with the team that wins both halves having a 2-2-2 format, as they start the Taiwan Series with one-win advantage.

==== 2022-Present ====
The two half-season winners are automatically the number one and two seeds; the one with the better full-season record gains an automatic berth into the Taiwan Series, played in a 2-2-3 format. The other team start their postseason from the Playoff Series with home advantage and one-win advantage, having a 1-1-2 format, against the number three seed Wildcard, awarded to the team with the best full-season record but didn't win either half-season.

If the same team wins both halves, the next two teams with the best full-season record play in the 2-2-1 format Playoff Series; the winner plays in the Taiwan Series, with the team that wins both halves having a 2-2-2 format, as they start the Taiwan Series with one-win advantage.

== Association football ==
The Apertura and Clausura tournaments are a relatively recent innovation for many Latin American football leagues in which the traditional season from August to May is divided in two sections per season, each with its own champion. Apertura and Clausura are the Spanish words for "opening" and "closing". In French-speaking Haiti, these are known as the Ouverture and the Fermeture, while in English-speaking Belize, they are respectively the "Opening" and "Closing" seasons. The North American Soccer League (NASL), a second-level league in the United States and Canada, adopted a split season in 2013; the season was divided into a "Spring Championship" and "Fall Championship".

== Basketball ==
During the sport's early history from the late 1890s (only a few years after the sport's invention by James Naismith) up until the 1940s, most of the professional basketball leagues from those decades would (mostly) see their leagues operate under a split season format instead of a regular season similar to what the National Basketball Association would use where the two best teams in each half-season would compete in a championship series to determine the overall league winner, if applicable (similar to that of the Negro leagues for baseball). Leagues from that era like the National Basket Ball League (back when the sport was spelled as basket ball instead of basketball) from 1898–1904, the Eastern Basketball League from 1909–1923, the New York State League from 1911–1923, the Pennsylvania State League from 1914–1921, the Interstate Basketball League from 1915–1917 and 1919–1920, the Metropolitan Basketball League from 1921–1927 alongside a different version of it from 1932–1933, and the original American Basketball League from 1925–1931 and from 1933 up until 1944 when they decided to stop using it in their league for good (alongside multiple other amateur and semi-pro basketball leagues from that same period of time before the NBA's creation) would all end up utilizing the split season format for various points in time throughout their histories for many different reasons at hand, with each of them ultimately utilizing a championship series by the end of it all (with a brief period in the 1910s decade involving a "World Series" attempt for the sport involving the multiple leagues of that era similar to that of baseball in the MLB as well). The usage of the split season in the sport of basketball would, for the most part, effectively end when the Basketball Association of America from 1946–1949 and the National Basketball League from 1937–1949 would merge operations to become the National Basketball Association and later established itself as the top league of the sport.

In its only complete season, the 1960s version of American Basketball League conducted a split season. The champions of East and West divisions in the first half met for a three-game playoff series in January 1962, won by the Kansas City Steers. After that series, the second half of the season began. The second half playoffs were more complicated, featuring a six-team tournament, won by the Cleveland Pipers. Once that was concluded, Cleveland defeated Kansas City for the overall championship.

== American football ==
The World Football League, for its 1975 season, planned on using the split season to determine the two teams that would play in World Bowl 2 that year, with the 18-game regular season divided into two nine-game segments. The Memphis Southmen won the first half of the regular season; the second half was never completed, and the league folded two weeks after the 1975 season midpoint.
