= List of Baltimore Orioles (1882–1899) managers =

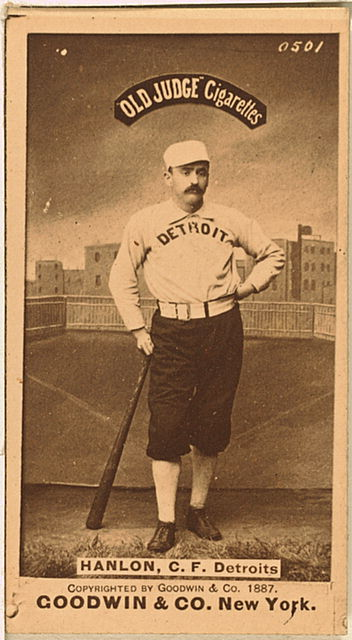
Hall of Famer Ned Hanlon managed the Baltimore Orioles to three National League championships.

The Baltimore Orioles were a 19th-century Major League Baseball team that played in Baltimore, Maryland. They played in the American Association when it was considered a major league from 1882 through 1891 and in the National League from 1892 through 1899. During their history, the 19th century Baltimore Orioles employed six managers. The duties of the team manager include team strategy and leadership on and off the field.

The Orioles first manager was their shortstop, Henry Myers. Myers managed the team for only one season, 1882, and led them to a record of 19 wins and 54 losses, for a winning percentage of .260. In 1883, Myers was replaced by Billy Barnie, who managed the team throughout the remainder of its time in the American Association, through 1891. Barnie managed the Orioles to a record of 470 wins and 548 losses, for a .462 winning percentage. The 1050 games Barnie managed were the most in Orioles' history, and the 548 games he lost were also the most in Orioles' history.

In 1892, the Orioles joined the National League and outfielder George Van Haltren became the team's manager. Van Haltren lasted only eleven games as manager, winning just one. Van Haltren's winning percentage of .091 is the lowest in Orioles' history. He was by John Waltz, who won just two of the eight games he managed. The third manager the Orioles employed in 1892 was outfielder Ned Hanlon. Hanlon managed the team through the 1898 season, leading the Orioles to three consecutive National League pennants in 1894, 1895 and 1896. In all, Hanlon managed the team for 946 games, winning 555, the most in Orioles history. His .601 winning percentage is also the highest of any Orioles manager.

In 1899, Hanlon became the manager of the Brooklyn Superbas, and third baseman John McGraw replaced him. McGraw managed the team to a 4th-place finish in 1899 with a record of 86 wins and 62 losses, after which the team was disbanded. Both McGraw and Hanlon were eventually elected to the Baseball Hall of Fame.

== Table key ==
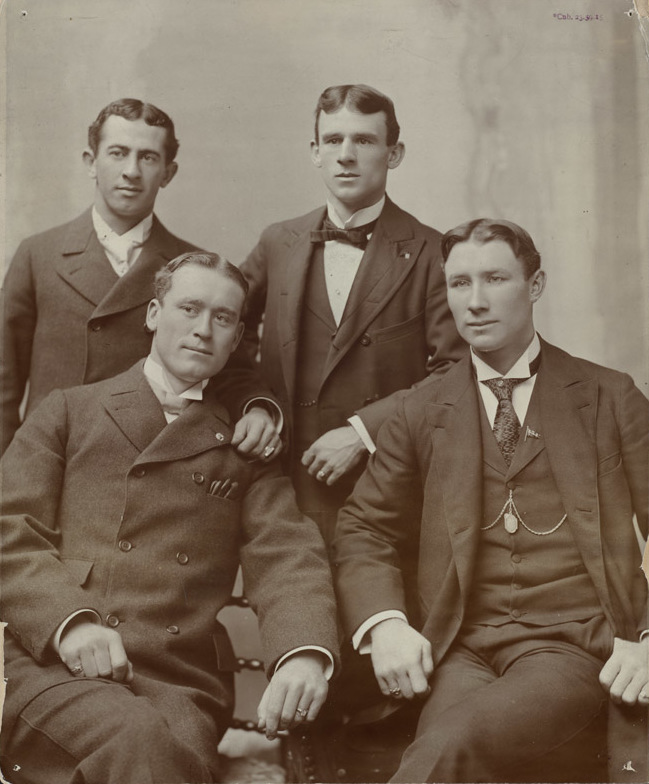
John McGraw (standing, to the right), the last Orioles' manager, with Orioles' teammates Joe Kelley (seated left), Hugh Jennings (seated right), and Willie Keeler (standing left)

#	A running total of the number of Orioles managers. Any manager who has two or more separate terms is only counted once.
G	Number of regular season games managed; may not equal sum of wins and losses due to tie games
W	Number of regular season wins in games managed
L	Number of regular season losses in games managed
WPct	Winning percentage: number of wins divided by number of games managed
PA	Playoff appearances: number of years this manager has led the franchise to the playoffs
PW	Playoff wins: number of wins this manager has accrued in the playoffs
PL	Playoff losses: number of losses this manager has accrued in the playoffs
LC	League Championships: number of League Championships, or pennants, achieved by the manager
WS	World Series: number of World Series victories achieved by the manager
⁂	Elected to the National Baseball Hall of Fame

== Managers ==
#	Image	Manager	Seasons	G	W	L	WPct	PA	PW	PL	LC	WS	Ref
1		Henry Myers	1882	74	19	54	.260	—	—	—	—	—	
2		Billy Barnie	1883–1891	1050	470	548	.462	—	—	—	—	—	
3		George Van Haltren	1892	11	1	10	.091	—	—	—	—	—	
4		John Waltz	1892	8	2	6	.250	—	—	—	—	—	
5		Ned Hanlon^{⁂}	1892–1898	946	555	369	.601	—	—	—	3	—	
6		John McGraw^{⁂}	1899	152	86	62	.581	—	—	—	—	—	
