= Specs Toporcer =

American baseball player (1899–1989)

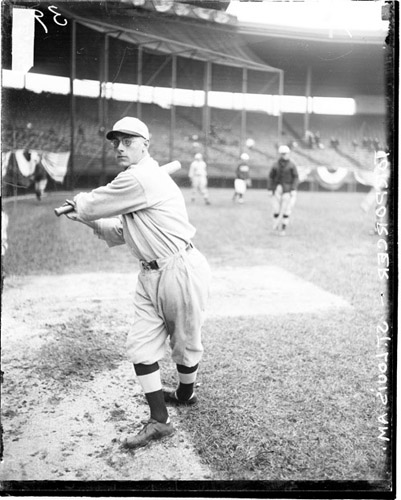
- Toporcer in 1921
- Infielder
- Born: February 9, 1899; New York, New York, U.S.
- Died: May 17, 1989 (aged 90); Huntington Station, New York, U.S.
- Batted: Left Threw: Right

MLB debut
- April 13, 1921, for the St. Louis Cardinals

Last MLB appearance
- June 2, 1928, for the St. Louis Cardinals

MLB statistics
- Batting average: .279
- Home runs: 9
- Runs batted in: 151
- Stats at Baseball Reference

Teams
- St. Louis Cardinals (1921–1928)

Career highlights and awards
- World Series champion (1926)

George Toporcer (born Toporczer; February 9, 1899 – May 17, 1989), nicknamed "Specs", was an American professional baseball infielder and executive. He played eight seasons in Major League Baseball for the St. Louis Cardinals from 1921 to 1928. He batted left-handed and threw right-handed, and was listed as 5 feet 10 inches (1.78 m) tall and 165 pounds (75 kg). Toporcer is widely considered as the first major league baseball position player to wear eyeglasses on the playing field.

== Early life ==
George Toporczer was obsessed with baseball from childhood, but he was always picked last during childhood games because of his slight build and glasses. He claimed in an interview that for the last 75 years he had thought about the sport nearly daily. He went to school and became friends with Jimmy Cagney, staying in touch into the later portions of their lives. When Toporczer was six he attended the 1905 World Series, and watched the Giants' Christy Mathewson pitch three shutouts. His two older brothers were diehard Giants fans and idolized the players, speaking of little else, influencing him such that he too became a Giants fan. When they lost the pennant to the Chicago Cubs in 1908 due to Merkle's Boner, he cried himself to sleep. By the time he was ten he would walk the five miles from his house to the Polo Grounds and find a vantage point spot on Coogan's Bluff, as the one cent allowance provided by his father, a shoe and boot seller, was not enough to purchase a ticket.

Toporczer was enthralled with what was known then as inside baseball, the strategies and tactics of the dead-ball era. His favorite Giant was the left fielder, George Burns, and he held a special admiration of the Giants' manager John McGraw, who he considered the best of his time. When he was thirteen Toporczer got a job at a local saloon as a scorekeeper, writing down the scores of the baseball games in exchange for fifty cents and free meals. While in seventh grade his history teacher formed a school baseball team but Toporczer was turned down. He still attended all of their games, and on one occasion he was the only one watching, and was asked to play centerfield as the team was shorthanded. During that game he made a difficult catch and contributed two hits. Around this time his father died and passed the business on to one of Toporczer's older brothers, and he had to forgo high school and help his brother run the store. Between working at the store and picking up odd jobs on the side, Toporczer was making more than enough to buy tickets and would regularly go to the Polo Grounds.

== Playing career ==
=== Major leagues ===
Born and reared in the Yorkville section of Manhattan, he never played high school or college ball and went directly from the sandlots to major league competition in 1921. Now known as George Toporcer, he split his first professional season between the Cardinals and the minor league Syracuse Stars, the Cardinals' top farm team. He played all infield positions for the Cardinals, especially shortstop, and was the club's most-used midfielder in both 1922 and 1925. In 1928, Toporcer got into only eight games for the Cardinals, and spent the bulk of the year with their top farm team, the Rochester Red Wings.

In his eight-season major-league career, Toporcer was a .279 hitter with nine home runs and 151 RBI in 546 games. As a fielder, he appeared in 453 games, playing shortstop (249 games), second base (105), third base (95), first base (3) and right field (1).

=== Minor league player-manager ===
Following his major league career, Toporcer played for the Cardinals Triple-A affiliate Rochester on four straight pennant-winning teams (1929–1932), being named the International League MVP in 1929 and 1930. He became the Red Wings' manager in 1932, continuing to play and manage the team until 1934. He continued to play in the minors until 1941, typically serving as a player-manager. During his seven years playing for Rochester, the Red Wings won the International League pennant four consecutive years. For the last three years in Rochester, he served as the manager of the Rochester team. But after a financial dispute with general manager Branch Rickey, Toporcer left the St. Louis organization. He would pilot other minor league teams for the next seven years before he became the farm director for the Boston Red Sox.

Toporcer left the Red Sox in 1948 and became the farm system director of the Chicago White Sox in 1949 and 1950.

== Loss of sight ==
In 1951, while managing the Buffalo Bisons, Toporcer became blind after a fifth operation to save his failing eyesight was unsuccessful.

During his time as the farm director for the Red Sox, Toporcer had begun to notice spots in his vision that were obstructing his sight. After visiting an eye specialist and having a lengthy examination, the doctor diagnosed him with a detached retina. Toporcer got the required surgery and the doctor proscribed a thirty-day bed rest, forbidden from moving his head so as not the dislodge the retina while it healed. Once the thirty days were over, the doctor removed the bandages to find the surgery had been unsuccessful; Toporcer had lost sight in his left eye. Another attempt was made to save his left eye, but it was unsuccessful. Then, while managing Buffalo in 1951, Toporcer began to experience problems with his right eye. After three more unsuccessful surgeries on that orb, Toporcer became blind in both eyes.

The Cardinals and Red Sox held benefits to defray the expenses of Toporcer's eye surgeries, but because years of playing baseball had toughened his fingertips, he was not able to master Braille. He became a motivational speaker and was known as "Baseball's Blind Ambassador."

In 1944, Toporcer wrote an autobiography, Baseball – From Backlots to Big Leagues, still considered one of the best manuals of instruction for coaches and young players. His life story was featured in a network TV show in which he played the lead.

Toporcer died in Huntington Station, New York, at the age of 90 from injuries sustained in a fall at his home. He was the last surviving member of the 1926 World Champion St. Louis Cardinals, as well as the last player profiled in Lawrence Ritter's classic work The Glory of Their Times.

== See also ==
- The Glory of Their Times, 1966 book
