= Small ball (baseball) =

Baseball offensive strategy

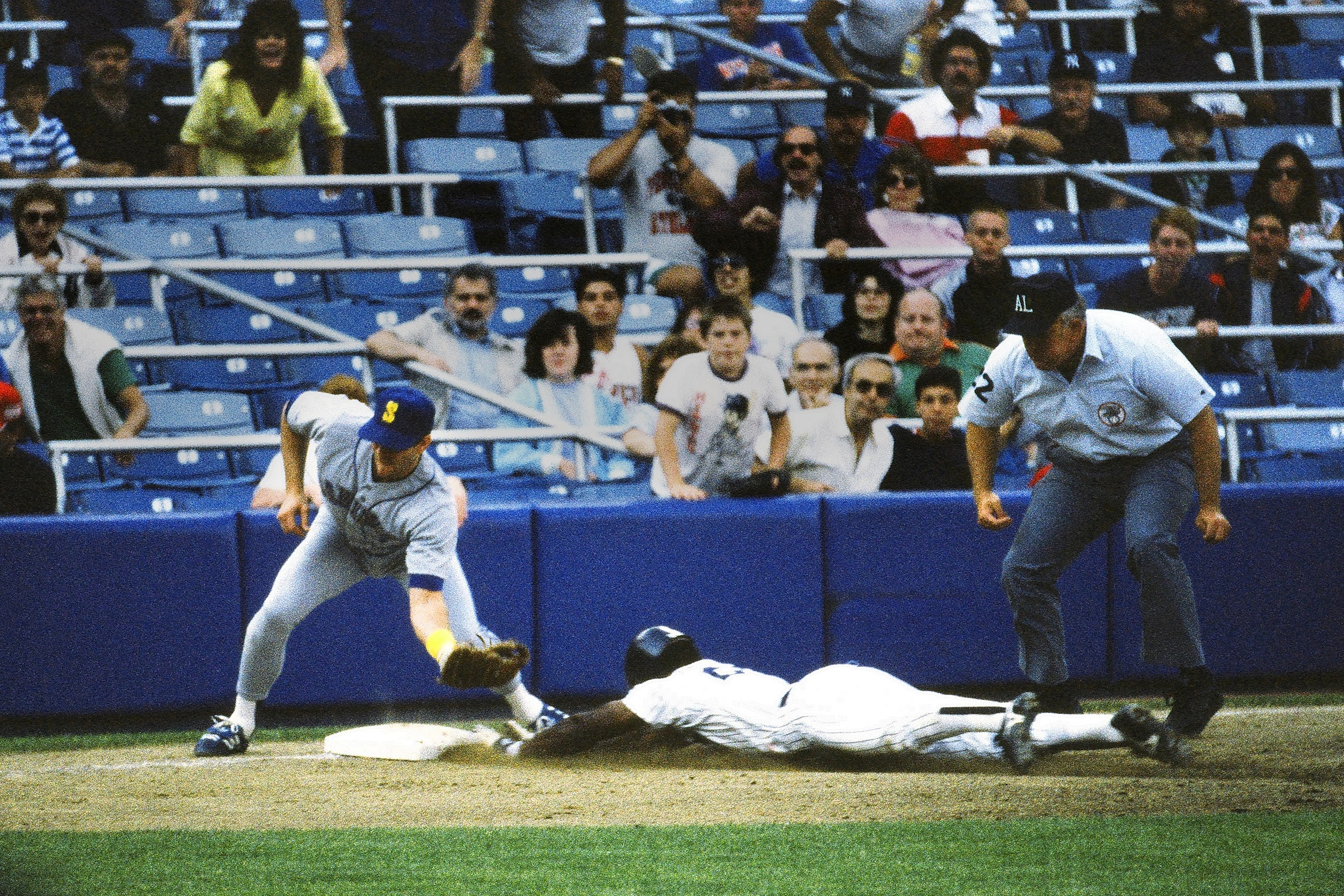
Stolen bases are one element of small ball. Here, the all-time stolen base leader, Rickey Henderson, swipes third in 1988.

Small ball is an informal term in the sport of baseball for an offensive strategy in which the batting team emphasizes placing runners on base and then advancing them into scoring position for a run in a deliberate way. This strategy places a high value on individual runs and attempts to score them without requiring extra base hits, or sometimes without base hits at all, instead using bases on balls, stolen bases, sacrifice bunt or sacrifice fly balls, the hit-and-run play, and aggressive baserunning with such plays as the contact play. A commonly used term for a run produced playing small ball is a "manufactured run". This style of play was more often found in National League game situations than in the American League due in large part to the absence of the designated hitter in the National League until the universal adoption of the Designated Hitter.

A team may incorporate a small-ball strategy for a variety of reasons, including:

- The team is confident that their pitching staff will allow very few runs, thus one or two runs may win the game.
- The ballpark being played in (or conditions there) does not favor runs created through extra base hits, especially home runs hit over the fences.
- The opposing pitching staff allows few hits, especially extra-base hits, and small ball may be the best way to score runs at all.
- The team lacks consistent hitters and must find a way to score runs with few base hits.
- The team has several members who are very quick and are likely to steal bases, or go from first base to third base on a single.
- The team is in the late innings of a close game and a single run will tie the game, break a tie, or extend a narrow lead.

Most commonly, managers will switch to small-ball tactics while a game is in progress, doing so upon the convergence of a variety of factors including having appropriate hitters coming up next in the batting order and, often, having fast runners already on base. A team could also start the game with the intention of playing small ball but then change from this strategy at some point during a game, depending on circumstances, such as when a dominant opposing pitcher is struggling or has left the game or when the team is ahead or behind by several runs.

== Background ==
Small ball is a contrast to a style sometimes called the "big inning", where batters focus more on getting extra-base hits and home runs. This may produce many innings with little but strikeouts and flyouts, but occasionally innings with several runs. By playing small ball, the team trades the longer odds of a big inning for the increased chances of scoring a single run. Specifically, small ball often requires the trading of an out to advance a runner and therefore historically reduced the number of batting opportunities that a team would have in a given inning.

Small ball was once the standard by which the game was played during the "dead-ball era" at the beginning of the 20th century, when both batting averages and home-run totals dropped to historic lows. Teams relied on bunting and stolen bases to score runs. The advent of new, cork-centered baseballs in 1910, as well as the outlawing of specialty pitches such as the spitball, saw a jump in batting averages and home runs.

By the 1950s, small ball had been forgotten with most teams relying on power hitters such as Mickey Mantle and Harmon Killebrew to score runs. Stolen bases totals were at a nadir, with Dom DiMaggio leading the American League in 1950 with just 15 stolen bases. When Paul Richards took over as the manager of the Chicago White Sox in 1951, his team had few power hitters, so he decided that he needed to manufacture runs by emphasizing speed as well as a strong defense. The White Sox became a contender and eventually, the team known as the Go-Go Sox won the American League championship in 1959 by relying on speed and defense. The Los Angeles Dodgers also used the strategy during the 1960s to win the World Series twice during the decade, relying on the pitching of Cy Young Award winners Sandy Koufax and Don Drysdale, and the base running of shortstop Maury Wills, who stole a then-record 104 bases in 1962.

Small ball has become less common because of the general trend toward smaller parks and more home runs. However, all big league managers are still skilled at managing from a small ball perspective, as it is sometimes necessary, especially in critical games. White Sox manager Ozzie Guillén was widely credited for saying his 2005 World Series champion team played not small ball or big inning ball, but "smart ball", which has come to mean a more adaptable strategy.

The general idea of playing small ball is much more widely accepted and used in Japan; good hitters will frequently be asked to lay down a sacrifice bunt in an attempt to advance the runner if the lead off batter reached first or second base.

== Historical examples ==
On May 16, 1952, the Philadelphia Phillies and Cincinnati Reds played at Shibe Park in Philadelphia. With the game tied 2–2 after nine innings, Philadelphia held the Reds scoreless in the top of the tenth inning. First baseman Eddie Waitkus, batting eighth for the Phillies, drew a walk to lead off the inning. Pitcher Ken Heintzelman, batting ninth, grounded into a fielder's choice (apparently on a sacrifice-bunt attempt), reaching base and advancing Waitkus to second; Heintzelman was pinch-run for by speedy infielder Putsy Caballero. The leadoff hitter, center fielder Richie Ashburn, bunted a single down the third-base line to load the bases, and shortstop Granny Hamner delivered a single to center field to score Waitkus. The only hits delivered were the surprise bunt single by Ashburn, and the actual game-winning hit by Hamner.

The San Francisco Giants were widely credited with winning the second game of the 2012 World Series against the Detroit Tigers on small ball. In a 2–0 victory, the Giants scored their first run on a ball that was grounded into a double play and later earned a run on a sacrifice fly.

The Kansas City Royals in particular embodied this style within the last decade, leading the league in stolen bases but finishing last in home runs in 2014 and 2015, leading to a berth in two consecutive World Series, one of which they won.

The Cleveland Guardians also embodied this style in 2022, leading the league in stolen bases and fewest strikeouts but finishing last in home runs. This led them all the way to the 2022 American League Division Series, which they lost to the New York Yankees.

== Alternative usages ==
"Small ball" can also be used to refer to any of the important but less glamorous techniques that individual players use to contribute to their team's success, also referred to as "baseball fundamentals". Examples include a baserunner sliding toward a fielder to disrupt a potential double play, or attempting to take an extra base during the defensive team's effort to throw out a fellow baserunner. Also the contact play, where runners at second and third, or just a runner at third, automatically advance when they see that the ball was hit on the ground.

When aggregated, such individual efforts can amount to small-ball tactics even when not deliberately deployed by a team's manager.

== See also ==
- Baseball scorekeeping
- Inside Baseball
- Whiteyball
