= 1892 Major League Baseball season =

1892 MLB season
- League: National League (NL)
- Sport: Baseball
- Duration: Regular season: 1st half: April 12 – July 13, 1892; 2nd half: July 15 – October 15, 1892; World's Championship Series: October 17–24, 1892
- Games: 154
- Teams: 12

Pennant winner
- NL champions: Boston Beaneaters
- NL runners-up: Cleveland Spiders
- First-half champions: Boston Beaneaters
- First-half runners-up: Brooklyn Grooms
- Second-half champions: Cleveland Spiders
- Second-half runners-up: Boston Beaneaters

World's Championship Series
- Venue: League Park, Cleveland, Ohio; South End Grounds, Boston, Massachusetts
- Champions: Boston Beaneaters
- Runners-up: Cleveland Spiders

MLB seasons
- ← 1891 1893 →

Locations of teams for the 1892 National League season
National League

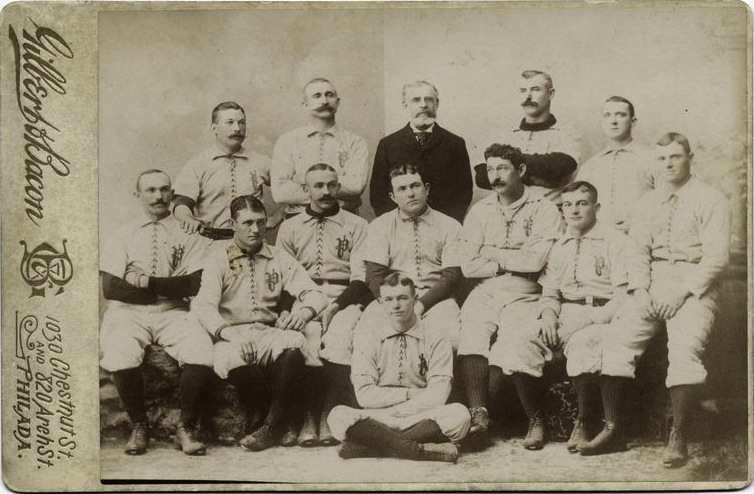
1892 Philadelphia Phillies Baseball Club Standing, left to right: Charlie Reilly, Sam Thompson, Harry Wright, Roger Connor, Bill Hallman Seated, left to right: Bob Allen, Ed Delahanty, Gus Weyhing, Jack Clements, Tim Keefe, Lave Cross, Billy Hamilton

The 1892 major league baseball season began on April 12, 1892. Unique to National League history, the season was organized into a split season format, with July 14 being the split date between the two half seasons. The regular season ended on October 15, with the Boston Beaneaters as the pennant winner of the National League overall, as well as the first-half champions, with the Cleveland Spiders as second-half champions. The postseason began with Game 1 of the eighth and final World's Championship Series on October 17 and ended with Game 6 on October 24. Aside from a tie game, the Beaneaters swept the Spiders with five wins in the best-of-nine playoff, and therefore winner of the final Dauvray Cup. This was Boston's only pre-modern championship.

The 1892 season saw the return of a postseason championship series (albeit a one-off of this format), following the demise of the American Association. The one-off was the first since the 1890 World's Championship Series. The next championship series would take place in 1894 via the Temple Cup.

The demise of the American Association saw four of its teams merged into the National League, including the Baltimore Orioles, Louisville Colonels, St. Louis Browns, and Washington Statesmen (renamed as the Washington Senators). The four other American Association clubs active at the end of the previous season, the Boston Reds, Columbus Solons, Milwaukee Brewers, and Philadelphia Athletics), saw their owners paid $135,000 (equivalent to $4,837,500 in 2025) and their players dispersed to the surviving clubs.

== Schedule ==
The 1892 schedule consisted of 154 games for the twelve teams of the National League. Each team was scheduled to play 12 games against the other eleven teams in the league. This replaced the 140-game, 20-games-each against seven-teams format previously used by the National League since 1888 and defunct-American Association since 1886. The 140-game format would return in 1900.

Opening Day took place on April 12 featuring all twelve teams. Each half of the season was split by an off day on July 14. The final day of the season was on October 15 and also featured all twelve teams. The 1892 World's Championship Series took place between October 17 and October 24.

== Rule changes ==
The 1892 season saw the following rule changes:

- Players' benches must be at least 25 feet from the baseline.
- Umpires now have discretion to declare a forfeit if teams engaged in “dilatory practices” to get a game called on account of rain or darkness.
- Umpire are now stated to be the "absolute judge of the plays" and that only the captain may approach the umpire to seek an interpretation of the playing rules.
- A batter would be entitled to only two bases if the ball cleared a fence less than 235 feet from home plate. Otherwise, the batter would be credited with a home run.
- A baserunner would be credited with a stolen base when he advanced more than one base on a single or infield out and when he advanced a base on a fair or foul fly out, "provided there is a possible chance and a palpable effort made to retire him."
- A batter was to be called out if he attempted to hinder the catcher from catching or throwing the ball "by stepping outside the lines of his position or otherwise obstructing or interfering with that player."
- Rules modifying hit by pitch were made; a batter was to be allowed first base if "his person or clothing" was hit by a pitched ball "excepting hands or forearms, which makes it a dead ball."
- A baserunner was now declared out for hindering a fielder, and all runners had to return to the bases last held.

== Teams ==
| League | Team | City | Ballpark | Capacity | Manager |
|---|---|---|---|---|---|
| National League | Baltimore Orioles | Baltimore, Maryland | Union Park | 6,500 | George Van Haltren |
| National League | Baltimore Orioles | Baltimore, Maryland | Union Park | 6,500 | John Waltz |
| National League | Baltimore Orioles | Baltimore, Maryland | Union Park | 6,500 | Ned Hanlon |
| National League | Boston Beaneaters | Boston, Massachusetts | South End Grounds | 6,800 | Frank Selee |
| National League | Brooklyn Grooms | Brooklyn, New York | Eastern Park | 12,000 | John Montgomery Ward |
| National League | Chicago Colts | Chicago, Illinois | South Side Park | 6,450 | Cap Anson |
| National League | Cincinnati Reds | Cincinnati, Ohio | League Park (Cincinnati) | 3,000 | Charles Comiskey |
| National League | Cleveland Spiders | Cleveland, Ohio | League Park (Cleveland) | 9,000 | Patsy Tebeau |
| National League | Louisville Colonels | Louisville, Kentucky | Eclipse Park | 5,860 | Jack Chapman |
| National League | Louisville Colonels | Louisville, Kentucky | Eclipse Park | 5,860 | Fred Pfeffer |
| National League | New York Giants | New York, New York | Polo Grounds | 16,000 | Patrick Powers |
| National League | Philadelphia Phillies | Philadelphia, Pennsylvania | Philadelphia Base Ball Grounds | 12,500 | Harry Wright |
| National League | Pittsburgh Pirates | Allegheny, Pennsylvania | Exposition Park | 6,500 | Al Buckenberger |
| National League | Pittsburgh Pirates | Allegheny, Pennsylvania | Exposition Park | 6,500 | Tom Burns |
| National League | St. Louis Browns | St. Louis, Missouri | Sportsman's Park | 12,000 | Jack Glasscock |
| National League | St. Louis Browns | St. Louis, Missouri | Sportsman's Park | 12,000 | Cub Stricker |
| National League | St. Louis Browns | St. Louis, Missouri | Sportsman's Park | 12,000 | Jack Crooks |
| National League | St. Louis Browns | St. Louis, Missouri | Sportsman's Park | 12,000 | George Gore |
| National League | St. Louis Browns | St. Louis, Missouri | Sportsman's Park | 12,000 | Bob Caruthers |
| National League | Washington Senators | Washington, D.C. | Boundary Field | 6,500 | Billy Barnie |
| National League | Washington Senators | Washington, D.C. | Boundary Field | 6,500 | Arthur Irwin |
| National League | Washington Senators | Washington, D.C. | Boundary Field | 6,500 | Danny Richardson |

1. In today's New York, New York.
2. In today's Pittsburgh, Pennsylvania.

== Standings ==
=== National League ===
National League
| Team | W | L | Pct. | GB | Home | Road |
|---|---|---|---|---|---|---|
| Boston Beaneaters | 102 | 48 | .680 | — | 54‍–‍21 | 48‍–‍27 |
| Cleveland Spiders | 93 | 56 | .624 | 8½ | 54‍–‍24 | 39‍–‍32 |
| Brooklyn Grooms | 95 | 59 | .617 | 9 | 51‍–‍24 | 44‍–‍35 |
| Philadelphia Phillies | 87 | 66 | .569 | 16½ | 55‍–‍26 | 32‍–‍40 |
| Cincinnati Reds | 82 | 68 | .547 | 20 | 45‍–‍32 | 37‍–‍36 |
| Pittsburgh Pirates | 80 | 73 | .523 | 23½ | 54‍–‍34 | 26‍–‍39 |
| Chicago Colts | 70 | 76 | .479 | 30 | 36‍–‍31 | 34‍–‍45 |
| New York Giants | 71 | 80 | .470 | 31½ | 42‍–‍36 | 29‍–‍44 |
| Louisville Colonels | 63 | 89 | .414 | 40 | 37‍–‍31 | 26‍–‍58 |
| Washington Senators | 58 | 93 | .384 | 44½ | 34‍–‍36 | 24‍–‍57 |
| St. Louis Browns | 56 | 94 | .373 | 46 | 37‍–‍36 | 19‍–‍58 |
| Baltimore Orioles | 46 | 101 | .313 | 54½ | 29‍–‍44 | 17‍–‍57 |

| National League First-half standings | W | L | Pct. | GB |
|---|---|---|---|---|
| Boston Beaneaters | 52 | 22 | .703 | — |
| Brooklyn Grooms | 51 | 26 | .662 | 2 1/2 |
| Philadelphia Phillies | 46 | 30 | .605 | 7 |
| Cincinnati Reds | 44 | 31 | .587 | 8 1/2 |
| Cleveland Spiders | 40 | 33 | .548 | 11 1/2 |
| Pittsburgh Pirates | 37 | 39 | .487 | 16 |
| Washington Senators | 35 | 41 | .461 | 18 |
| Chicago Colts | 31 | 39 | .443 | 19 |
| St. Louis Browns | 31 | 42 | .425 | 20 1/2 |
| New York Giants | 31 | 43 | .419 | 21 |
| Louisville Colonels | 30 | 47 | .390 | 23 1/2 |
| Baltimore Orioles | 20 | 55 | .267 | 32 1/2 |

| National League Second-half standings | W | L | Pct. | GB |
|---|---|---|---|---|
| Cleveland Spiders | 53 | 23 | .697 | — |
| Boston Beaneaters | 50 | 26 | .658 | 3 |
| Brooklyn Grooms | 44 | 33 | .571 | 9 1/2 |
| Pittsburgh Pirates | 43 | 34 | .558 | 10 1/2 |
| Philadelphia Phillies | 41 | 36 | .532 | 12 1/2 |
| New York Giants | 40 | 37 | .519 | 13 1/2 |
| Chicago Colts | 39 | 37 | .513 | 14 |
| Cincinnati Reds | 38 | 37 | .507 | 14 1/2 |
| Louisville Colonels | 33 | 42 | .440 | 19 1/2 |
| Baltimore Orioles | 26 | 46 | .361 | 25 |
| St. Louis Browns | 25 | 52 | .325 | 28 1/2 |
| Washington Senators | 23 | 52 | .307 | 29 1/2 |

=== Tie games ===
18 tie games, which are not factored into winning percentage or games behind (and were often replayed again), occurred throughout the season. Values in parentheses show first-half and second-half ties.

- Baltimore Orioles, 5 (0, 5)
- Boston Beaneaters, 2 (1, 1)
- Brooklyn Grooms, 4 (1, 3)
- Chicago Colts, 1 (1, 0)
- Cincinnati Reds, 5 (2, 3)
- Cleveland Spiders, 4 (1, 3)
- Louisville Colonels, 2 (0, 2)
- New York Giants, 2 (0, 2)
- Philadelphia Phillies, 2 (1, 1)
- Pittsburgh Pirates, 2 (0, 2)
- St. Louis Browns, 5 (1, 4)
- Washington Senators, 2 (0, 2)

== Postseason ==
=== Bracket ===
| World's Championship Series |
| NL1 | Boston Beaneaters | 0^{11} | 4 | 3 | 4 | 12 | 8 |
| NL2 | Cleveland Spiders | 0^{11} | 3 | 2 | 0 | 7 | 3 |

== Managerial changes ==
=== Off-season ===
| Team | Former Manager | New Manager |
|---|---|---|
| Baltimore Orioles | Billy Barnie | George Van Haltren |
| Boston Reds | Arthur Irwin | Team folded |
| Cincinnati Reds | Tom Loftus | Charles Comiskey |
| Columbus Solons | Gus Schmelz | Team folded |
| Milwaukee Brewers | Charlie Cushman | Team folded |
| New York Giants | Jim Mutrie | Patrick Powers |
| Philadelphia Athletics | George Wood | Team folded |
| Pittsburgh Pirates | Bill McGunnigle | Al Buckenberger |
| St. Louis Browns | Charles Comiskey | Jack Glasscock |
| Washington Senators | Sandy Griffin | Billy Barnie |

=== In-season ===
| Team | Former Manager | New Manager |
|---|---|---|
| Baltimore Orioles | George Van Haltren | John Waltz |
| Baltimore Orioles | John Waltz | Ned Hanlon |
| Louisville Colonels | Jack Chapman | Fred Pfeffer |
| Pittsburgh Pirates | Al Buckenberger | Tom Burns |
| St. Louis Browns | Jack Glasscock | Cub Stricker |
| St. Louis Browns | Cub Stricker | Jack Crooks |
| St. Louis Browns | Jack Crooks | George Gore |
| St. Louis Browns | George Gore | Bob Caruthers |
| Washington Senators | Billy Barnie | Arthur Irwin |
| Washington Senators | Arthur Irwin | Danny Richardson |

== League leaders ==
=== National League ===
Hitting leaders
| Stat | Player | Total |
|---|---|---|
| AVG | Dan Brouthers (BRO) | .335 |
| OPS | Dan Brouthers (BRO) | .911 |
| HR | Bug Holliday (CIN) | 13 |
| RBI | Dan Brouthers (BRO) | 124 |
| R | Cupid Childs (CLE) | 136 |
| H | Dan Brouthers (BRO) | 197 |
| SB | John Montgomery Ward (BRO) | 88 |

Pitching leaders
| Stat | Player | Total |
|---|---|---|
| W | Bill Hutchinson (CHI); Cy Young (CLE) | 36 |
| L | George Cobb (NYG) | 37 |
| ERA | Cy Young (CLE) | 1.93 |
| K | Bill Hutchinson (CHI) | 314 |
| IP | Bill Hutchinson (CHI) | 622.0 |
| SV | Gus Weyhing (PHI) | 3 |
| WHIP | Cy Young (CLE) | 1.062 |

== Milestones ==
=== Batters ===
- Wilbert Robinson (BAL):
  - Set a Major League record by hitting 11 runs batted in (RBI) in a single game against the St. Louis Browns on June 10, and the first to hit at least 10.
  - Set a Major League record for most hits in a single nine inning game when he hit seven times against the St. Louis Browns on June 10.

=== Pitchers ===
==== No-hitters ====
- Jack Stivetts (BSN):
  - Stivetts threw his first career no-hitter and the first no-hitter in franchise history, by defeating the Brooklyn Grooms 11–0 on August 6. Stivetts walked five and struck out six.
- Ben Sanders (LOU):
  - Sanders threw his first career no-hitter and the third no-hitter in franchise history, by defeating the Baltimore Orioles 6–2 on August 22. Sanders walked two and struck out none.
- Bumpus Jones (CIN):
  - The second player to accomplish this feat, Jones threw his first career no-hitter in his first major league appearance. Jones also threw the first no-hitter in franchise history, by defeating the Pittsburgh Pirates 7–1 on October 15. Jones walked four and struck out three.

==== Other pitching accomplishments ====
- John Clarkson (CLE/BSN):
  - Became the fifth member of the 300-win club, defeating the Pittsburgh Pirates as a part of the Cleveland Spiderson September 21, winning 3–2.

== Home field attendance ==
| Team name | Wins | %± | Home attendance | %± | Per game |
|---|---|---|---|---|---|
| Cincinnati Reds | 82 | 46.4% | 196,473 | 101.5% | 2,456 |
| Philadelphia Phillies | 87 | 27.9% | 193,731 | −10.8% | 2,392 |
| St. Louis Browns | 56 | −34.1% | 192,442 | — | 2,566 |
| Brooklyn Grooms | 95 | 55.7% | 183,727 | 1.2% | 2,355 |
| Pittsburgh Pirates | 80 | 45.5% | 177,205 | 38.4% | 1,991 |
| Boston Beaneaters | 102 | 17.2% | 146,421 | −20.6% | 1,927 |
| Cleveland Spiders | 93 | 43.1% | 139,928 | 6.0% | 1,771 |
| Louisville Colonels | 63 | 16.7% | 131,159 | — | 1,874 |
| New York Giants | 71 | 0.0% | 130,566 | −38.0% | 1,653 |
| Chicago Colts | 70 | −14.6% | 109,067 | −39.9% | 1,628 |
| Washington Senators | 58 | 31.8% | 128,279 | — | 1,833 |
| Baltimore Orioles | 46 | −35.2% | 93,589 | — | 1,215 |

== Venues ==
Having previously split their time in two ballparks for the 1891 season, the Chicago Colts permanently leave the site of West Side Park after playing there for seven seasons since 1885 in favor of South Side Park.

== See also ==
- 1892 in baseball (Events, Births, Deaths)
