= Inside baseball =

Inside baseball may refer to:

- Inside baseball (strategy)
- Inside baseball (metaphor)
- Inside Baseball, a weekly column in Sports Illustrated
