= Tommy Leach =

American baseball player (1877–1969)

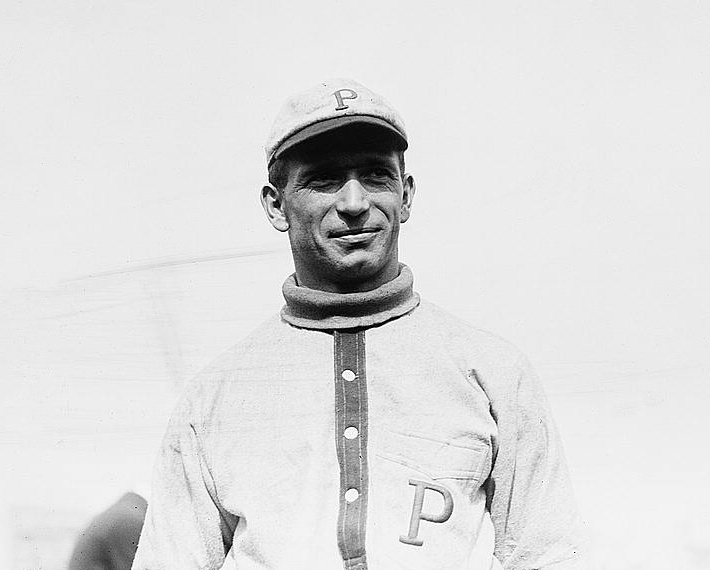
- Leach in 1911
- Outfielder / Third baseman
- Born: November 4, 1877; French Creek, New York, U.S.
- Died: September 29, 1969 (aged 91); Haines City, Florida, U.S.
- Batted: Right Threw: Right

MLB debut
- September 28, 1898, for the Louisville Colonels

Last MLB appearance
- September 2, 1918, for the Pittsburgh Pirates

MLB statistics
- Batting average: .269
- Hits: 2,143
- Home runs: 63
- Runs batted in: 812
- Stats at Baseball Reference

Teams
- Louisville Colonels (1898–1899); Pittsburgh Pirates (1900–1912); Chicago Cubs (1912–1914); Cincinnati Reds (1915); Pittsburgh Pirates (1918)

Career highlights and awards
- World Series champion (1909); NL home run leader (1902)

Thomas Andrew Leach (November 4, 1877 – September 29, 1969) was an American professional baseball outfielder and third baseman. He played in Major League Baseball from 1898 through 1918 for the Louisville Colonels, Pittsburgh Pirates, Chicago Cubs and Cincinnati Reds.

Leach led the National League in home runs in 1902 with six, and played in the first modern World Series in 1903 with the Pirates, hitting four triples to set a record that still stands. He played alongside legendary ballplayers such as Honus Wagner and Mordecai Brown. Leach began his career primarily as an infielder including playing shortstop, second base and, mostly, third base. Later, to take advantage of his speed, Leach played mostly outfield. Leach is also famous for being interviewed for Lawrence Ritter's 1966 book The Glory of Their Times.

In the span of his career, Leach was 5th among all players in hits.

== Pittsburgh years ==
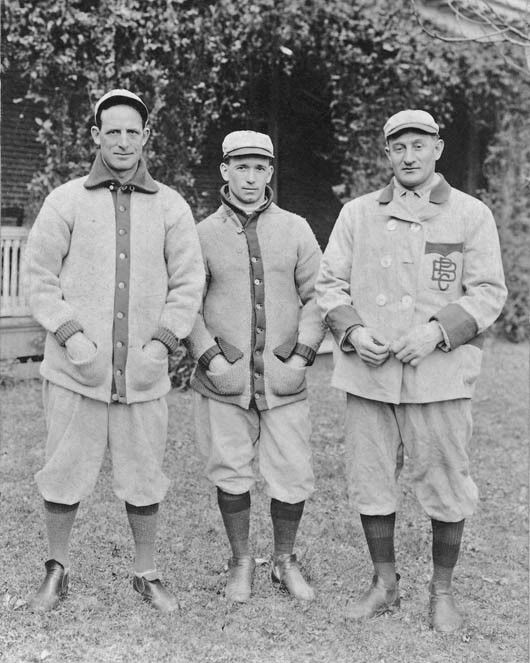
Leach (center) with Pirates teammates Fred Clarke and Honus Wagner

Leach was well known for his small stature and was nicknamed "Wee Tommy". In 1902, while with the Pirates, he led the National League in home runs with a total of six. Each one was of the inside-the-park variety, which was not unusual in the "dead-ball era". 49 of Leach's 63 career home runs were inside-the-park, which is still a National League record.

During Leach's years in Pittsburgh as a regular and playing with stars such as Honus Wagner, the Pirates won the National League pennant four times and were World Series champions once. Among the swiftest runners of his era, Leach had 361 stolen bases, 1,355 runs scored, and 172 triples.

=== 1903 World Series ===
Following two years of infighting, and a subsequent peace pact signed by the presidents of the National and American leagues, Barney Dreyfuss, owner of the Pirates, saw an opportunity to bring fans back to the game and so proposed a "World Series" between the top teams in the two leagues, Boston and Pittsburgh.

With stars Wagner, Leach and player–manager Fred Clarke, Pittsburgh appeared the more formidable of the two, and jumped to a three to one series lead. Leach had the first World Series hit, a triple off Cy Young, and scored the first World Series run in game one with Wagner batting him in. Leach finished the game with two singles and two triples as the Pirates won, seven to three. In game four, Leach again starred, getting two hits, including a two-run triple and knocking in three runs, with the Pirates winning a close game five to four.

Pittsburgh, at this point, had a seemingly insurmountable three games to one lead, but would not win again, losing the series to Boston five games to three. Despite the loss, Pittsburgh owner Barney Dreyfuss could feel his vision of a World Series had been a success, since the public had come out in large numbers to watch the games with over 100,000 paying spectators. The games had been hard-fought, with the players on both teams giving it their all, and the Pirates had proven to be a mighty foe, with stars such as Leach proving their worth on the field. Leach led both teams in RBIs in the series with seven and finished second on the Pirates in batting average for the series. A commonly cited anecdote, one which Leach recounted to Lawrence Ritter, is the Boston Royal Rooters constant chanting of the popular song "Tessie" threw Honus Wagner off his game, though it is more likely that Wagner played hurt during the series.

== Later years ==
After his playing career was over Leach managed in the minor leagues, was signed as an infield coach for the minor league Atlanta Crackers in 1929, and did some scouting for the Boston Braves. He was considered for a few managerial positions, including manager of the New York Yankees as well as the Chicago entry of the Federal League. Leach eventually retired in Florida where he went into the citrus business. He was the oldest participant included in Lawrence Ritter's famous The Glory of Their Times collection, having been born in 1877 and being 86 when Ritter interviewed him.

In Leach's book interview with Ritter he recounted an anecdote concerning Dummy Hoy, who he roomed with in 1899. "We got to be good friends. He was a real fine ballplayer. When you played with him in the outfield, the thing was that you never called for a ball. You listened for him and if he made this little squeaky sound, that meant he was going to take it." Leach went on to say, "We hardly ever had to use our fingers to talk, though most of the fellows did learn the sign language, so that when we got confused or something we could straighten it out with our hands." As a result of this and similar experiences, some historians credit Hoy with umpires using hand signals for balls and strikes and safe and out calls.

In the fall of 1960, Leach appeared on the television program I've Got A Secret alongside Boston American Freddy Parent, as a commemoration of participating in the first World Series in 1903.

== See also ==
- List of Major League Baseball career hits leaders
- List of Major League Baseball career triples leaders
- List of Major League Baseball career runs scored leaders
- List of Major League Baseball annual home run leaders
- List of Major League Baseball annual runs scored leaders
- List of Major League Baseball annual triples leaders
