= Ned Hanlon (baseball) =

American baseball player and manager (1857–1937)

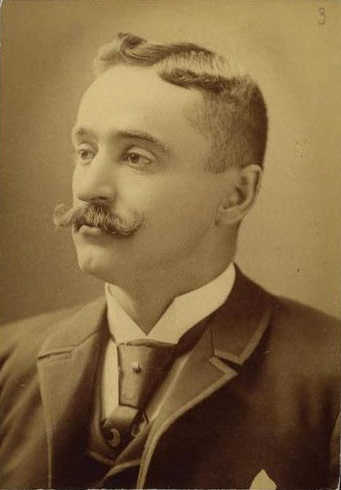
- Tomlinson Studio portrait of Hanlon, c. 1887
- Center fielder / Manager
- Born: August 22, 1857; Montville, Connecticut, U.S.
- Died: April 14, 1937 (aged 79); Baltimore, Maryland, U.S.
- Batted: Left Threw: Right

MLB debut
- May 1, 1880, for the Cleveland Blues

Last MLB appearance
- September 15, 1892, for the Baltimore Orioles

MLB statistics
- Batting average: .259
- Home runs: 30
- Runs batted in: 518
- Stolen bases: 329
- Managerial record: 1,313–1,164–53
- Winning %: .530
- Stats at Baseball Reference

Teams
- As player: Cleveland Blues (1880); Detroit Wolverines (1881–1888); Pittsburgh Alleghenys (1889); Pittsburgh Burghers (1890); Pittsburgh Pirates (1891); Baltimore Orioles (1892); As manager: Pittsburgh Alleghenys (1889); Pittsburgh Burghers (1890); Pittsburgh Pirates (1891); Baltimore Orioles (1892–1898); Brooklyn Superbas (1899–1905); Cincinnati Reds (1906–1907)

Career highlights and awards
- As player: NL pennant (1887); As manager: 5× NL pennant (1894, 1895, 1896, 1899, 1900)

Member of the National

Baseball Hall of Fame
- Induction: 1996
- Election method: Veterans Committee

Edward Hugh Hanlon (August 22, 1857 – April 14, 1937), also known as "Foxy Ned", and sometimes referred to as "the Father of Modern Baseball", was an American professional baseball player and manager whose career spanned from 1876 to 1914. He was posthumously inducted into the Baseball Hall of Fame in 1996 by the Veterans Committee.

Hanlon was a manager in Major League Baseball from 1889 to 1907, compiling a 1,313–1,164 (.530) record with five different clubs. He is best remembered as the manager of the Baltimore Orioles (1892–1898) and Brooklyn Superbas (1899–1905). In the seven seasons from 1894 to 1900, Hanlon compiled a 635–315 (.668) record, and his teams won five National League pennants. During his years with the Orioles, Hanlon was also credited with inventing and perfecting the "inside baseball" strategy, including the "hit and run" play and the Baltimore chop. In 1899, he became the second manager in baseball history to win 100 games in a season, doing so after Brooklyn won 101 games to win the National League pennant. The following year, he won his final National League pennant with Brooklyn, his fifth in seven seasons.

Hanlon also played 13 seasons in Major League Baseball, principally as a center fielder. He played in over 800 games as an outfielder for the Detroit Wolverines, remaining with the team during all eight years of its existence from 1881 to 1888. He compiled a career batting average of .260 and an on-base percentage of .325 with 930 runs scored and 1,317 hits. Although stolen base records are not available for the early portion of his playing career, Hanlon stole 329 bases (an average of 55 per year) in his last six years as a full-time player.

== Early life ==
Hanlon was born in 1857 at Montville, Connecticut. His parents, Terrance and Mary Hanlon, were immigrants from Ireland. In 1870, Hanlon's father worked as a railroad laborer while Ned, at age 13, along with his older brother James (age 14) and younger brother O'Brien (age 11) worked in a cotton mill to help support the family. By 1880, the family had moved a few miles south to New London, where Hanlon's father, three brothers (James, Bryon and Terrance) and a step-sister (Clara Blake) were all working in a cotton mill. Ned was saved from life in the mill by his talent for baseball. The 1880 census recorded his occupation, in contrast to his other family members, as a professional ball player.

== Professional baseball career ==
=== Minor leagues ===
Hanlon began his professional baseball career in 1876 at age 17 or 18 with the Providence, Rhode Island club. He next played for the Fall River, Massachusetts club in the New England League in 1877, the Rochester, New York club in the International Association in 1878, and the Albany, New York team in the National Association in 1879. He played third base at Albany, posted a .315 batting average and scored 44 runs in 47 games.

=== Cleveland ===
Hanlon made his major league debut on May 1, 1880, as a member of the Cleveland Blues of the National League. He appeared in 73 games for the Blues, 69 as an outfielder and four as a shortstop, and compiled a .246 batting average with 32 RBIs. On June 12, 1880, he made the final out of the first perfect game in major league history, a 1–0 victory by Lee Richmond of the Worcester Ruby Legs.

=== Detroit ===
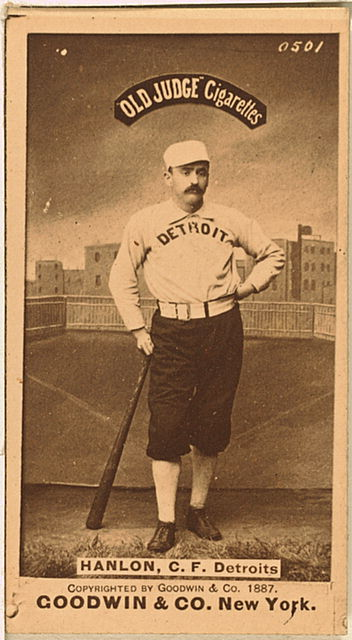
Old Judge baseball card of Hanlon with Detroit, 1887

Hanlon joined the newly formed Detroit Wolverines in 1881. He is one of only two players, along with Charlie Bennett, who played for the Wolverines during all eight years of the team's existence. In his eight seasons with the Wolverines, Hanlon compiled a .261 batting average, which was boosted to a .318 on-base percentage by 271 bases on balls and six times hit by pitch. He hit over .300 only once in his career, compiling a .302 batting average (.372 on-base percentage) in 1885.

During his time with Detroit, Hanlon was considered to be an excellent base-runner. Although stolen base records are not available for the years before 1886, Hanlon stole 329 bases (an average of 55 per year) in his last six years as a full-time player. His base-running prowess is also evidenced by his scoring 623 runs on only 879 hits for the Wolverines. The Sporting News called him a "wonderful base runner and a spark plug." In October 1885, The Sporting Life wrote that it was a "striking illustration of Ned Hanlon's daring and speed that for two years Buck Ewing has never once succeeded in throwing him out at second on a steal. And Buck is one of the best throwers in the League."

Hanlon had excellent range in center field, leading the league in outfield putouts in 1882 and 1884 and ranking among the league leaders every year from 1882 to 1887. He also led the league in double plays turned from the outfield in 1882 (eight) and 1883 (six) and ranked among the leading outfielders in range factor five times from 1882 to 1887. Perhaps as a result of his extensive range, Hanlon was also regularly among the leaders in outfield errors and led the league with 35 errors in 1880, 38 in 1885 and 31 in 1891. In 1886, The Sporting Life wrote: "Ned Hanlon never played a more brilliant fielding game than now. It is doubtful if any other fielder ever did, either." Decades later, The Sporting News opined that Hanlon was "one of the greatest ground coverers the game ever had."

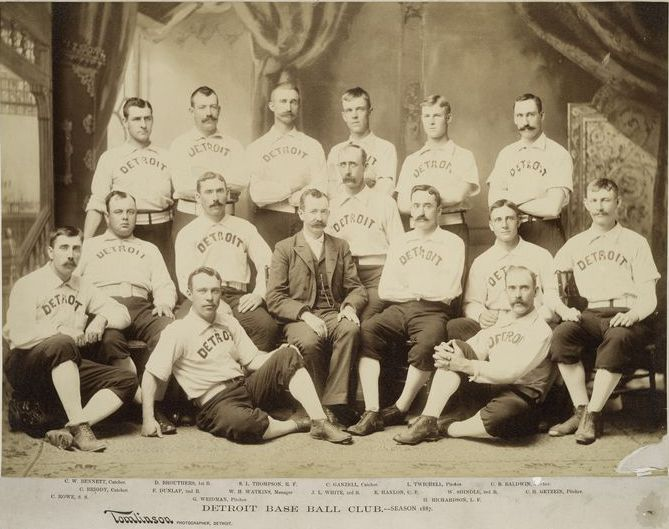
1887 Detroit Wolverines: Hanlon 3rd from right in first row of seats

Hanlon became captain of the Wolverines in 1885, and during the 1886 and 1887 seasons, led teams that rank among the greatest in Detroit baseball history. After acquiring sluggers Sam Thompson, Dan Brouthers and Hardy Richardson, and with pitcher Lady Baldwin winning 42 games, the 1886 Wolverines compiled an 87–36 (.707) record, but finished 2 1/2 games behind the Chicago White Stockings. The 1887 Wolverines won the pennant with a 79–45 record.

In 1888, the Wolverines finished in fifth place with a 68–63 record. The team folded in October 1888, and Hanlon was sold to the Pittsburgh Alleghenys.

=== Spalding trip ===
During the winter of 1888–89, Hanlon traveled to Hawaii, Australia, Ceylon, Arabia, Egypt, Europe, and the British Isles as part of Albert Spalding's "Around the World Baseball Tour". Baseball games were held between the Chicago White Stockings and a picked team called the "All-Americans"; Hanlon played center field for the "All-Americans".

=== Pittsburgh ===
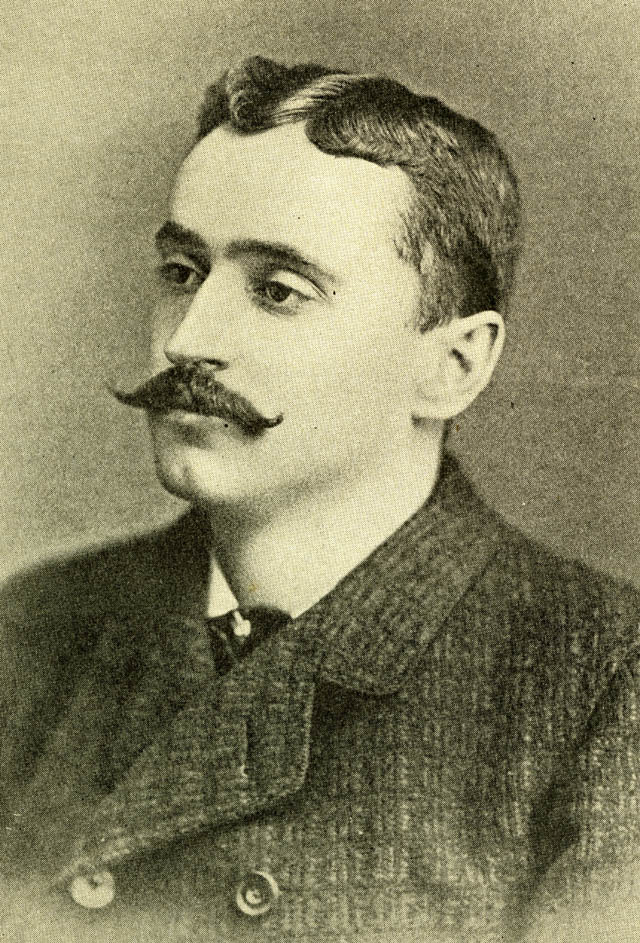
Hanlon portrait, c. late 1880s – early 1890s

After returning from the Spalding tour, Hanlon joined the Pittsburgh Alleghenys and took over as a player-manager in the second half of the season. The Alleghenys had compiled a 35–53 record and were languishing near the basement of the National League before Hanlon took over as manager. In the last part of the season, Hanlon led the team to a 26–18 record. As a player, Hanlon compiled a .239 batting average (.326 on-base percentage), scored 81 runs, and stole 53 bases during the 1889 season.

In late 1889, Hanlon was one of the early supporters and organizers of the new Players' League. He served as player-manager for the Pittsburgh Burghers during the 1890 season. In Hanlon's first full season as a manager, his team compiled a 60–68 record and finished in sixth place in the Players' League. Hanlon put in a solid performance as a player in 1890, posting a .278 batting average and a career-high .389 on-base percentage fueled by a career-high 80 bases on balls. He also led the Players' League with 291 outfield putouts, posted a 2.59 range factor (3rd highest among the league's outfielders), and ranked fourth in the league with 65 stolen bases.

The Players' League folded after one season, though Hanlon was credited with working harder than anyone else to make the league a success. One account published in late 1890 stated: "I want to say, gentlemen, that you can talk of the loyalty of a Ward, a Ewing, a Keefe and so on, but give me Ned Hanlon above everybody else. He stands to-day as the hero of the Players' League. He is the only ball player in that League who has held to the contract he signed. Not a penny has he received for his work this season, although he has played better ball than ever before."

Hanlon returned to the Alleghenys as player-manager in 1891. Prior the 1891 season, Hanlon was involved in an incident that led to the Pittsburgh team acquiring the name "Pirates." After the collapse of the Players' League, Hanlon traveled to Pennsylvania's Presque Isle Peninsula in the dead of winter to sign second baseman, Louis Bierbauer. Alfred Spink, the founder of The Sporting News, wrote about the incident in 1910 for a journal called The Pirates Reader. According to Spink, Hanlon crossed the ice on the harbor during a snow storm, finally reached Bierbauer's home and got him to sign a contract with the Alleghenys. The Philadelphia Athletics of the American Association, objected to Bierbauer's signing and stated that he should return to Philadelphia, since that was the team that employed him before his defection to the Players' League. An official for the American Association called Hanlon's act in signing Bierbauer to be "piratical." The Alleghenies contended that because "the American Association did not reserve Bierbauer, he was a free agent". An arbitrator agreed, and soon players and fans alike were calling the team the "Pittsburgh Pirates."

Connie Mack was the catcher on the 1891 team; he and Hanlon became fast friends and remained close until Hanlon's death in 1937. Mack would credit Hanlon with teaching him baseball strategy and how to manage.

The 1891 season was Hanlon's last as a full-time player. At age 34, he compiled a .266 batting average and .341 on-base percentage, scored 87 runs, and stole 54 bases. He was also manager of the Alleghenys for most of the 1891 season, during which time the team compiled a record of 31–47.

=== Baltimore ===
==== Rough start ====
Hanlon began the 1892 season with Pittsburgh, but he strained a tendon in his right leg in practice before the first game and did not appear in any games. On May 5, 1892, Hanlon signed as captain and manager of the Baltimore Orioles. He took over as manager after George Van Haltren and John Waltz led the team to a 3–16 record in the first 19 games. Hanlon fared only somewhat better than Van Haltren and Waltz, as the team went 43–85 for the remainder of the season and finished 12th (last place) in the National League.

==== Assembling the talent ====
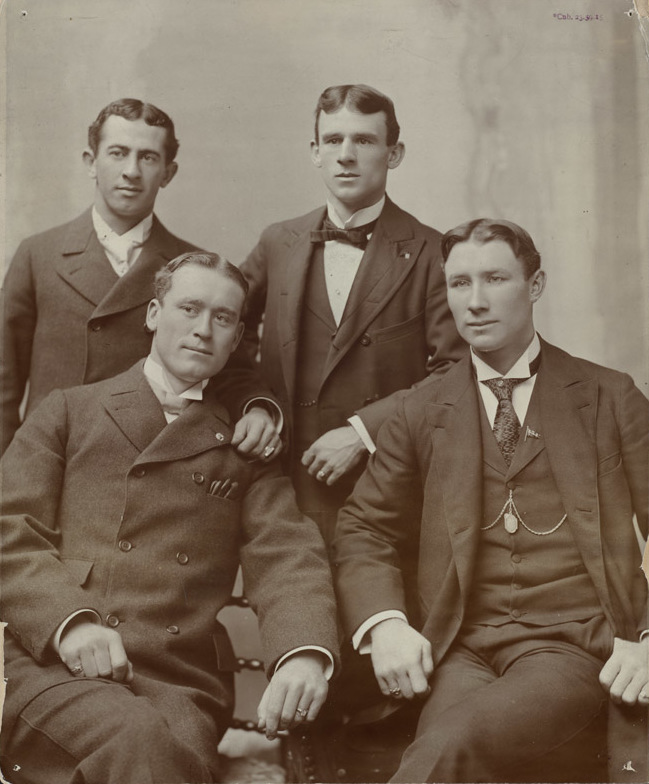
Four of the star players of Hanlon's Orioles: "Wee Willie" Keeler, Joe Kelley, John McGraw, and Hughie Jennings, circa 1894

While Hanlon was not able to immediately turn the Orioles into a winning club, he quickly evaluated the talent available and looked for new talent elsewhere. By 1894, only three players from the 1892 opening lineup (John McGraw, Wilbert Robinson and pitcher Sadie McMahon) remained on the roster. Hanlon's efforts to revamp the club included the following:

- Shortstop John McGraw had played only 33 major league games with a .270 batting average before the 1892 season. Under Hanlon's tutelage, McGraw became one of the best players in the game, compiling batting averages of .340 in 1894, .369 in 1895, and .325 in 1898. McGraw was later inducted into the Baseball Hall of Fame.
- Catcher Wilbert Robinson was with the Orioles when Hanlon arrived, but had compiled a .216 batting average in six prior seasons. With Hanlon's guidance, Robinson hit .334 in 1893, .353 in 1894, and .347 in 1896. Robinson was later inducted into the Baseball Hall of Fame.
- In September 1892, Hanlon showed nerve in trading George Van Haltren to the Pittsburgh Pirates in exchange for Joe Kelley and cash. Van Haltren was the Orioles' best hitter, a veteran who had hit compiled a .324 batting average from 1889 to 1891. Kelley was a rookie outfielder who hit .239 for the 1892 Pirates. Kelley promptly became one of the best players in the game, batting .393 in 1894, .365 in 1895 and .364 in 1896. Kelley was later inducted into the Hall of Fame.
- Prior to the 1893 season, Hanlon purchased infielder Heinie Reitz from the San Francisco Metropolitans (California League) for $300. Reitz had compiled a .243 batting average for San Francisco in 1892, but blossomed with Hanlon's Orioles. He led the National League's second basemen in fielding percentage three times, led the National League in Defensive Wins Above Replacement in 1897, placed fourth in that category in 1894, and led the National League with 31 triples and hit .303 in 1894.
- In June 1893, Hanlon acquired shortstop Hughie Jennings in exchange for Tim O'Rourke in a trade with the Louisville Colonels. O'Rourke had been a consistent .300 hitter before the trade, but never hit above .282 after the trade. Jennings had compiled a .242 average with Louisville in three seasons before the trade. At Baltimore, Jennings led the league in fielding percentage every year from 1894 to 1897, and he hit .335 in 1894, .386 in 1895, and .401 in 1896. Jennings was later inducted into the Baseball Hall of Fame.
- In August 1893, Hanlon purchased outfielder Steve Brodie from the St. Louis Browns for a price reported to be between $800 and $2500. Brodie became a key player in the Orioles' pennant-winning clubs, batting .366 in 1894 and .348 in 1895.
- In January 1894, Hanlon negotiated a remarkably one-sided trade with the Brooklyn Grooms, acquiring Dan Brouthers and Willie Keeler in exchange for Billy Shindle and George Treadway. Brouthers was an established slugger who had been teammates with Hanlon in Detroit. Brouthers hit .347 and drove in 127 runs for the 1894 Orioles. Keeler had played only 41 games before joining the Orioles, but under Hanlon's guidance, Keeler hit .371 in 1894, .377 in 1895, .386 in 1896, and won batting titles in 1897 and 1898 with averages of .424 and .385. Shindle hit .274 in five seasons with Brooklyn, while Treadway hit .301 for two seasons in Brooklyn and was then out of the major leagues. Brouthers and Keeler were both inducted into the Hall of Fame.
- In June 1894, Hanlon made a final key move, purchasing Kid Gleason from the St. Louis Browns for $2,400. Gleason hit .231 in six major league seasons before joining the Orioles. He proved to be a solid fielder at second base and hit .349 for the Orioles in 1894 and .309 in 1895.

For his efforts in building Baltimore's championship teams, Hanlon developed a reputation for having a keen eye for talent. The Sporting News later wrote that he had "an almost uncanny ability to judge players, a faculty of imparting to them his remarkable store of knowledge, a genius for inspiring his men to rise to the heights and a personality that enabled him to gain and hold the confidence of all with whom he came into contact."

==== Peak years ====
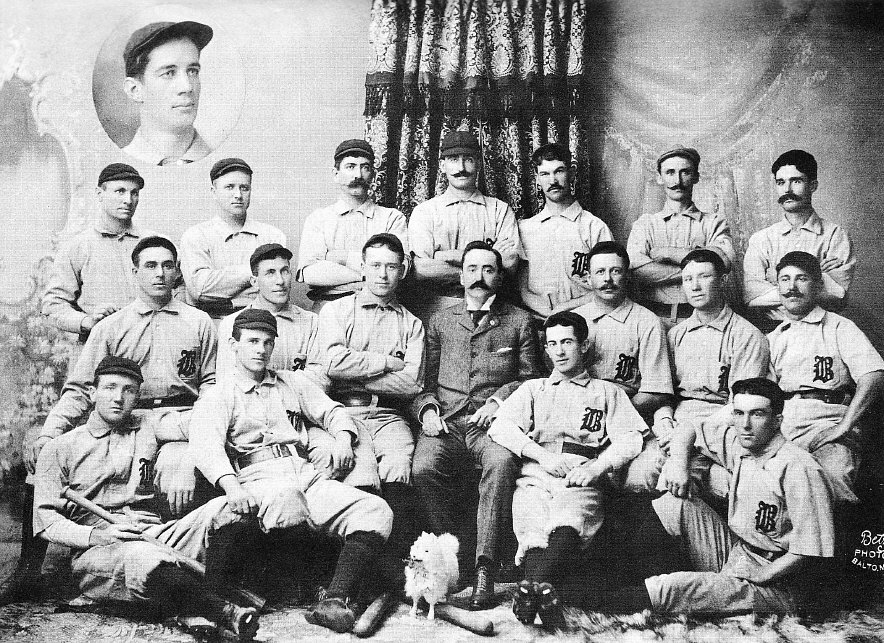
Manager Ned Hanlon (in business suit, center) with the 1896 Baltimore Orioles, including Willie Keeler (front row, to right of Hanlon, with elbow on Hanlon's knee), Hughie Jennings (2nd row, 2nd from right), Joe Kelley (left of Hanlon), and John McGraw (2nd from left, front row)

By 1894, the Orioles had a lineup with future Hall of Famers at six positions: Robinson at catcher, Brouthers at first, Jennings at shortstop, McGraw at third base, and Keeler and Kelley in the outfield. The team compiled an 89–39 (.695) record and won the first of what would be three consecutive National League pennants.

In May 1895, Hanlon sold Brouthers to the Louisville Cardinals. Brouthers played only 71 games in the major leagues after the trade. Hanlon replaced Brouthers at first base with Scoops Carey in 1895 and "Dirty Jack" Doyle in 1896 and 1897. Doyle hit .339 in 1896 and .354 in 1897 for the Orioles. The 1895 Orioles won their second pennant with a record of 87–43 (.669). In 1896, the team was without Brouthers and Robinson, but won its third consecutive pennant with a 90–39 (.693) record.

The Orioles had further strong performance in 1897 and 1898, compiling records of 90–40 and 96–53, but finished in second place both seasons behind the Boston Beaneaters.

==== "Inside baseball" ====
During his years in Baltimore, Hanlon became known as "Foxy Ned" and was credited with inventing a new strategy that came to be known as "inside" baseball. The strategy focused on teamwork, speed and execution, and encompassed the hit and run play, the squeeze play, the sacrifice bunt, the double steal, and the Baltimore chop. The Sporting News wrote that Hanlon's "introduction and perfection of 'inside baseball'" had "initiated and brought to their highest point of efficiency the hit and run, bunt, sacrifice, chop hit, and base running, always doing the unexpected." A writer in The Baltimore Sun noted, "It occurred to [Hanlon] that a run gained by strategy counted as big as a run gained by slugging. Accordingly, he evolved an offensive technique that made baseball into something of an art."

Hanlon introduced the hit and run play during the 1894 season. He took the Orioles to Macon, Georgia, for spring training, a move that was called a "goofy venture" in the press. While in Macon, he practiced and perfected the hit and run. In the opening series of the 1894 season against the New York Giants, Hanlon's players ran the hit and run 13 times. New York manager John Montgomery Ward objected to the tactic, claiming that Hanlon "wasn't playing baseball, but a new game." The tactic was deemed to be legal, and Hanlon proudly demonstrated it for fans before games started during the 1894 season.

Hanlon's Orioles were also known for their opportunistic play, Willie Keeler famously declaring, "Hit 'em where they ain't." Having been a particularly weak batter against left-handed pitchers, Hanlon learned from his own weakness and was one of the first managers to employ the platoon system, switching players in the lineup depending on whether the opposing pitcher was left- or right-handed.

Connie Mack, who was a player on Hanlon's 1891 Pittsburgh club and then an opponent as manager of the Pirates from 1894 to 1896, said, "I always rated Ned Hanlon as the greatest leader baseball ever had. I don't believe any man lived who knew as much baseball as he did."

Hanlon's strategic innovations led The Sporting News to call him "the game's greatest strategist" and led many to call him "The Father of Modern Baseball."

=== Brooklyn ===
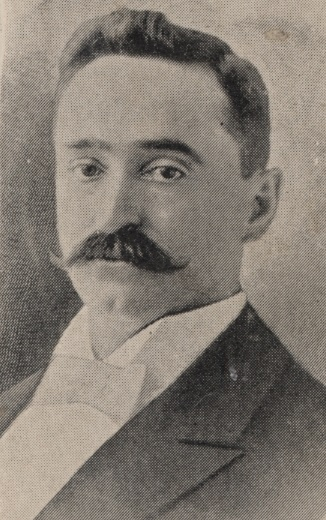
Hanlon in 1903 with Brooklyn

In October 1898, rumors spread that Hanlon may move to the Brooklyn Bridegrooms and take many of the Orioles' players with him. By December 1898, discussions were underway for a consolidation of the Brooklyn and Baltimore clubs in Brooklyn.

Negotiations continued through the winter, and ultimately a deal was struck which resulted in Hanlon and Baltimore owner Harry Von der Horst receiving stock in the Brooklyn club and with von der Horst as the controlling shareholder of both clubs. Under the deal, Hanlon became the manager of Brooklyn and took Keeler, Kelley and Jennings with him to Brooklyn. The Brooklyn team, formerly known as the Bridegrooms, was dubbed the "Superbas" in the press, simply because the new manager shared the same name as a popular vaudeville acrobatic troupe known as Hanlon's Superbas.

Hanlon led his 1899 Superbas to a 101–47 record and a National League pennant. Outfielders Keeler and Kelley led the offense with averages of .379 and .325. On the mound, pitchers Jack Dunn, Jim Hughes and Brickyard Kennedy combined for a 73–28 record.

The 1900 Superbas again won the pennant with an 82–54 record as Keeler and Kelley again led the offense with averages of .362 and .319. Joe McGinnity, later inducted into the Hall of Fame, was acquired from the Orioles in March 1900 and led the pitching staff with a 28–8 record.

Prior to the 1900 season, the Superbas also acquired Jimmy Sheckard from the Orioles. Sheckard hit .354 with 19 triples for Hanlon's team in 1901. The Superbas finished the 1901 season in third place with a 79–57 (.581) record. In 1902, Keeler hit .333, but no other player on the Brooklyn team hit above .280. The Superbas again finished the season in third place with a 75–63 record. By 1903, Keeler was gone, and Brooklyn dropped to fifth place with a 70–66 record.

In 1904 and 1905, Hanlon was left with teams that lacked a single .300 hitter. The 1904 team dropped to sixth place with a 56–97 record, and the 1905 team finished in last place with a 48–104 record.

=== Cincinnati ===
In December 1905, Hanlon signed a contract to manage the Cincinnati Reds during the 1906 season for $8,000 salary. Hanlon was reunited with Joe Kelley in Cincinnati, but Kelley was past his prime and compiled a .228 batting average in 1906. Second baseman Miller Huggins was Hanlon's best batsman in 1906 with a .292 average. The Reds finished the 1906 season in sixth place with a 64–87 record. The following season, the Red again finished in sixth place, again lacked a .300 hitter, and compiled a 66–87 record. After the 1907 season, Hanlon retired from managing.

=== Baltimore Orioles (minor league) ===
The National League Baltimore Orioles franchise folded after the 1899 season, leaving Baltimore without a professional baseball club. An American League version of the Orioles arrived in 1901, but that team moved to New York after the 1902 season and became the New York Yankees. Hoping to keep professional baseball alive in Baltimore, Hanlon in January 1903 purchased the Montreal Royals of the Eastern League for $5,000 and moved the club to Baltimore as the newest incarnation of the Baltimore Orioles. Hanlon also purchased the ballpark used by the American League Orioles for $3,000, although it had been built only two years earlier at a cost of $21,000. Hanlon owned the Eastern League Orioles through the 1908 season, but sold the team and ballpark on November 16, 1909, for $70,000 – a profit of more than $60,000 on his 1903 investment of $8,000.

=== Baltimore Terrapins ===
In November 1913, Hanlon became the principal shareholder in the Baltimore Terrapins of the Federal League, a third major league that existed from 1914 to 1915. Hanlon took no role in managing the Terrapins, and the team finished in third place with an 84–70 record in 1914, but dropped to last place in 1915 with a 47–107 record.

The Federal League collapsed after the 1915 season, and most of the Federal League owners were bought out by owners of the American and National Leagues, or were compensated in other ways (for example, the owner of the St. Louis Federal League team was permitted to buy the St. Louis Browns). Hanlon and his co-owners in the Terrapins were not provided with any compensation, and the Terrapins thereupon sued the National and American Leagues for conspiring to monopolize baseball by buying the Federal League's other constituent clubs, thereby destroying the Federal League. At trial, the defendants were found jointly liable, and damages of $80,000 assessed, which was tripled to $240,000 ($3.86 million in modern dollars), under the provisions of the Clayton Antitrust Act. The judgment was reversed on appeal, ultimately resulting in a United States Supreme Court decision, Federal Baseball Club v. National League, written by Justice Oliver Wendell Holmes, Jr., holding that baseball was not interstate commerce and was therefore not subject to regulation, including antitrust regulation, by the federal government. The case, decided in 1922, is the basis upon which baseball, unlike any other professional sport, still claims an exemption from federal antitrust laws.

=== Coaching tree ===
Many of those who played on teams managed by Hanlon went on to careers as managers. Prominent examples include:

| Name | Played for Hanlon | Years | Managed | Years | Record | Pct | Championships |
|---|---|---|---|---|---|---|---|
| Connie Mack | Pittsburgh | 1891 | Pittsburgh Pirates; Philadelphia Athletics | 1894–1896; 1901–1950 | 3,731–3,948 | .486 | 9 AL; 5 WS |
| John McGraw | Baltimore | 1892–1898 | Baltimore Orioles; New York Giants | 1899–1902; 1902–1932 | 2,763–1,948 | .586 | 10 NL; 3 WS |
| Miller Huggins | Cincinnati | 1906–1907 | St. Louis Cardinals; New York Yankees | 1913–1917; 1918–1929 | 1,413–1,134 | .555 | 6 AL; 3 WS |
| Wilbert Robinson | Baltimore | 1892–1898 | Baltimore Orioles; Brooklyn Dodgers | 1902; 1914–1931 | 1,399–1,398 | .500 | 2 NL |
| Hughie Jennings | Baltimore; Brooklyn | 1893–1900 | Detroit Tigers; New York Giants | 1907–1920; 1924–1925 | 1,131–972 | .538 | 3 AL |
| Fielder Jones | Brooklyn | 1899–1900 | Chicago White Sox; St. Louis Terriers; St. Louis Browns | 1904–1908; 1914–1915; 1916–1918 | 683–582 | .540 | 1 AL; 1 WS |
| Fred Mitchell | Brooklyn | 1904–1905 | Chicago Cubs; Boston Braves | 1917–1920; 1921–1923 | 494–543 | .476 | None |
| Joe Kelley | Baltimore; Brooklyn | 1892–1901 | Cincinnati Reds; Boston Doves | 1902–1905; 1908 | 338–321 | .513 | None |
| Bill Dahlen | Brooklyn | 1899–1903 | Brooklyn Dodgers | 1910–1913 | 251–355 | .414 | None |
| Bill Donovan | Brooklyn | 1899–1902 | New York Yankees; Philadelphia Phillies | 1915–1917; 1921 | 234–301 | .449 | None |
| Deacon McGuire | Brooklyn | 1899–1901 | Boston Red Sox; Cleveland Indians | 1907–1908; 1909–1911 | 189–240 | .441 | None |
| Totals | | | | | | | 19 AL, 12 NL, 12 WS |

Additionally, according to Bill James, at one time the great majority of major league managers were part of Hanlon's managerial "family tree."

=== Baseball Hall of Fame ===
At the time of Hanlon's death in April 1937, the Baseball Hall of Fame had not inducted any managers. However, The Sporting News observed at the time that, when the Hall was ready to begin inducting the game's leading managers, Hanlon's place would be assured based on his accomplishments that had "left an indelible print on the annals of the game." Yet, even when the Hall began inducting managers, beginning in December 1937 with two of Hanlon's former players-turned-managers (John McGraw and Connie Mack), Hanlon was overlooked for another 59 years, though he was named to the Hall's Honor Rolls of Baseball in 1946.

Hanlon was not without nay-sayers who questioned his contributions to the championship teams in Baltimore and Brooklyn. Some opined that the credit for the five pennants rested entirely with his Hall of Fame players—John McGraw, Joe Kelley, Hughie Jennings and Willie Keeler. In fact, Hanlon had a 304–441 (.408) record in the portion of his career when he did not have Willie Keeler on his teams. One prominent critic was Sam Crawford who was interviewed in the 1960s—long after Hanlon and most of his colleagues had been deceased – for Lawrence Ritter's book, The Glory of Their Times. Although Crawford never played for Hanlon, and did not become a major league starter until 1900, Crawford made the following claim:

Ned Hanlon used to manage that Baltimore club, but those old veterans didn't pay any attention to him. Heck, they all knew baseball inside out... [T]hose old Baltimore Orioles didn't pay any more attention to Ned Hanlon, their manager, than they did to the batboy... He was a bench manager in civilian clothes. When things would get a little tough in a game, Hanlon would sit there on the bench and wring his hands and start telling some of the old-timers what to do. They'd look at him and say, 'For Christ's sake, just keep quiet and leave us alone. We'll win this ball game if you only shut up.'

In 1995, John Steadman of The Baltimore Sun published an article urging Hanlon's induction. Steadman pointed to Hanlon's strategic innovations as being worthy of the Hall, and suggested that Hanlon's omission may have been the result of having committed an "unpardonable sin" in suing Major League Baseball for violation of the antitrust laws. In 1996, Hanlon was finally inducted into the Hall of Fame by vote of the Veterans Committee.

== Family and later years ==
Hanlon and his wife, Ellen Jane Kelly Hanlon, were wed on February 6, 1890. They had five children: Edward (born 1891), Joseph (born 1893), Mary (born 1895), Helen (born 1898), and Catherine Lillian (born c. 1903).

Hanlon moved to Baltimore when he assumed control of the Orioles in 1892 and lived there for the rest of his life. For more than 30 years, he lived at 1401 Mount Royal Avenue in Baltimore. In 1900 and 1910, Hanlon also had two Irish women working as live-in servants.

In September 1916, Hanlon was appointed to the Baltimore City Board of Park Commissioners. He remained on the Park Board for 21 years and was its chairman beginning in 1931. In 1918, Hanlon's son, Joseph, was killed while serving as a lieutenant in the United States Army during action on the Western Front in France during World War I. In January 1920, the Baltimore City Department of Parks on which Hanlon had served on the supervising board, renamed a park off Liberty Heights Avenue in northwest Baltimore as Hanlon Park in honor of Hanlon's son; it had formerly been known as Ashburton Park.

In December 1932, Hanlon's wife, Helen, died after suffering for several years from a heart ailment. Hanlon died a little more than four years later at age 79. He had been ill for three years and in serious condition for several months when he suffered a heart attack on April 10 and died on April 14, 1937. A requiem mass was held at Corpus Christi Roman Catholic Church on Mount Royal Avenue in the Bolton Hill neighborhood of Baltimore, and he was interred in the New Cathedral Cemetery on Frederick Road in southwest Baltimore. Hanlon left an estate valued at $128,000 to be shared by his surviving son and three daughters.

== See also ==
- List of Major League Baseball managers with most career wins
