= The Man in the Dugout =

1977 book by Donald Honig

- First edition
- Author: Donald Honig
- Language: English
- Publisher: University of Nebraska Press
- Publication date: 1977
- Publication place: United States
- Pages: 343
- ISBN: 0803272707 (Paperback edition)

The Man in the Dugout: Fifteen Big League Managers Speak Their Minds is a 1977 baseball book. It was edited by Donald Honig, who interviewed 15 current and former Major League Baseball managers about their careers in professional baseball.

== Chapters ==
1. Bobby Bragan
2. Burleigh Grimes
3. Eddie Sawyer
4. Joe McCarthy
5. Walter Alston
6. Paul Richards
7. Ossie Bluege
8. Bob Shawkey
9. Al López
10. Dick Williams
11. Roger Peckinpaugh
12. Mayo Smith
13. Billy Herman
14. Luke Sewell
15. Jimmy Dykes
