= Donald Honig =

American novelist

- Born: Donald Honing; August 17, 1931 (age 95); Maspeth, New York, U.S.
- Occupation: Writer

Donald Martin Honig (born August 17, 1931) is an American novelist, historian and editor who mostly writes about baseball.

== Career ==
While a member of the Bobo Newsom Memorial Society, an informal group of writers, Honig attempted to convince Lawrence Ritter to write a sequel to his 1966 book The Glory of Their Times. Pleading time limitations, Ritter declined to attempt such a book himself, but gave Honig his blessing, leading to the books Baseball When the Grass Was Real (1975) and Baseball Between The Lines (1976).

Over the next 19 years, Honing churned out 39 books about baseball. He collaborated with Ritter on The 100 Greatest Baseball Players of All Time in 1981.

He also published several illustrated histories of long-standing franchises. Honig published his most recent baseball book, The Fifth Season, in 2009.

Honig was also a frequent contributor of short stories to Alfred Hitchcock's Mystery Magazine.

== Awards and honors ==
The city of Cromwell, Connecticut named September 24, 2020, “Donald Honig Day” in recognition of his career.

== Personal life ==
Honig married Sandra Schindlinger in 1972; they later divorced. He currently resides in Venice, Florida, after living in Cromwell, Connecticut through 2020.

== Bibliography ==
- Man with a Problem (1958)
- The Journal of One Davey Wyatt (1971)
- Johnny Lee (1971)
- An End of Innocence (1972)
- The Severith Style (1972)
- Way to Go, Teddy (1973)
- Illusions (1974)
- Coming Back (1974)
- Fury on Skates (1974)
- Baseball When the Grass Was Real (1975)
- Baseball Between the Lines (1976)
- Winter Always Comes (1977)
- The Last Great Season (1979)
- Marching Home (1980)
- The Brooklyn Dodgers: An Illustrated Tribute (1981)
- The 100 Greatest Baseball Players of All Time (1981)
- The New York Yankees: An Illustrated History (1981)
- Baseball's Ten Greatest Teams (1982)
- The Los Angeles Dodgers: The First Quarter Century (1983)
- The American League: An Illustrated History (1983)
- The National League: An Illustrated History (1983)
- The Boston Red Sox: An Illustrated Tribute (1984)
- Baseball America (1985)
- Dodgers: The Complete Record of Dodgers Baseball (1986)
- New York Mets: The First Quarter Century (1986)
- The World Series: An Illustrated History from 1903 to the Present (1986)
- The All-Star Game: A Pictorial History, 1933 to Present (1987)
- Mays, Mantle, Snider: A Celebration (1987)
- The Greatest First Basemen of All Time (1988)
- The Donald Honig Reader (1988)
- Baseball in the '30s: A Decade of Survival: An Illustrated History (1989)
- The Plot to Kill Jackie Robinson (1992)
- The October Heroes: Great World Series Games Remembered by the Men Who Played Them (1996)
- The Sword of General Englund: A Novel of Murder in the Dakota Territory, 1876 (1996)
- Classic Baseball Photographs, 1869-1947 (1999)
- The Fifth Season: Tales of My Life in Baseball (1999)

=== As editor ===
- The Man in the Dugout: Fifteen Big League Managers Speak Their Minds (1977)
