= Intentional base on balls =

Walk issued by a pitcher to avoid the potential for the batter to get a hit

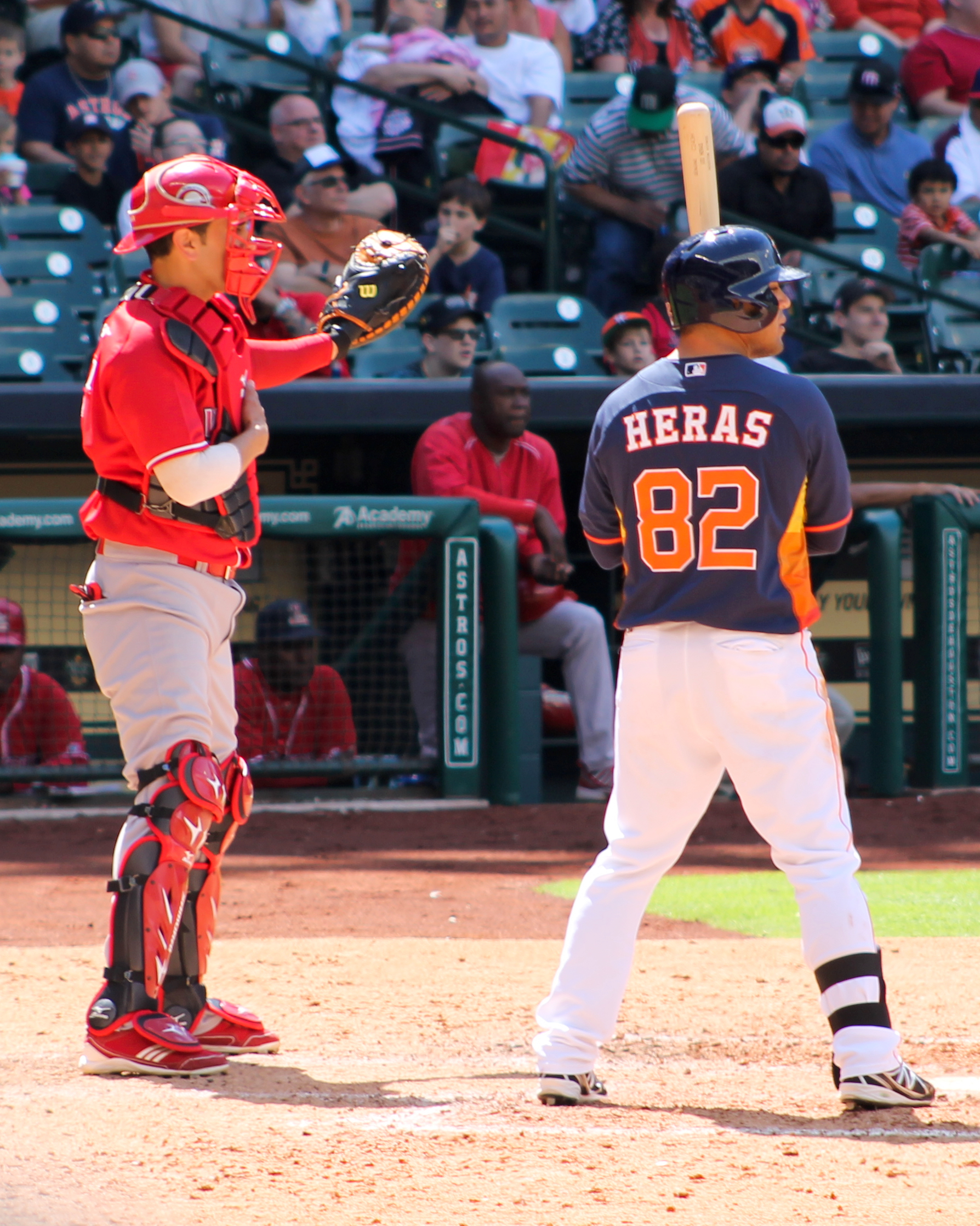
A catcher for the Mexican League's Rojos del Águila de Veracruz uses his glove to signal the pitcher for an intentional walk.

In baseball, an intentional base on balls, usually referred to as an intentional walk and denoted in baseball scorekeeping by IBB, is a walk issued to a batter by a pitcher with the intent of removing the batter's opportunity to swing at the pitched ball. A pitch that is intentionally thrown far outside the strike zone for this purpose is referred to as an intentional ball.

Beginning with the 2017 season, Major League Baseball has removed the requirement to throw four intentional balls. In MLB and in amateur baseball, such as high school and college games, and in most levels of Little League Baseball, the manager of the team on the field now simply asks the plate umpire to let the batter go to first base. However, beginning in 2023, Little League restricted the procedure to once per game to a single batter. If a batter is to be intentionally walked a second time, four intentional balls must be thrown.

== Strategy ==
The purpose of an intentional walk is to bypass the current batter in order to face the following batter, whom the defensive team expects to be easier to put out. The risk to the fielding team issuing an intentional walk is that they turn the batter into a baserunner, which runs counter to the fielding team's objective of making outs.

Situations that may call for an intentional walk include the following:

- With one out and a runner on second or third base, converting a powerful batter to a runner on first base means that a subsequent ground ball may become a double play that ends the scoring threat. With a runner on second, this move lets fielders put the lead runner out using a force play rather than the more difficult tag play.
- In the bottom of the ninth or an extra inning, having a runner on first base might not affect the outcome of the game at all. For example, if the game is tied and there is a runner on third base, the game is over if that runner scores. The benefit of an intentional walk is as set out above, and in this case, the risk is minimal.
- Prior to the adoption of the designated hitter rule, if the designated hitter has been discontinued because of substitution rules, or if a defensive replacement has been inserted into the game late, if there were a runner on base, the defense might walk a hitter to instead pitch to the next player if he is an opposing pitcher or a defensive replacement late in a game. This would give the offensive manager a dilemma: the manager could pinch-hit for the pitcher to capitalize on the offensive threat, but at the cost of removing the pitcher or defensive replacement from the game.

The intentional walk disfavors a team that has one batter who is much better than the others, as it often lets opponents "take the bat out of his hands" and opt to pitch to the next batter.

== Rules and scoring ==
An intentional base on balls — whether achieved through intentional balls or through declaration — has the effect of any other base on balls. The batter is entitled to take first base without being put out. Any runner already on first base is awarded second base, and so on; if the bases are loaded, an intentional base on balls results in the scoring of a run.

Statistically, receiving an intentional base on balls does not count as an official at bat for a batter, but does count as a plate appearance and a base on balls. An intentional ball is counted as a ball in the count of the pitcher's balls and strikes thrown.

=== Semi-intentional walk ===
Even in leagues where a team can walk a batter by declaration, the pitcher may be instructed to "pitch around" the batter. The manager defers the decision to intentionally walk the pitcher to see whether the batter swings at bad pitches. If the count goes to three balls, where the pitcher would have to deliver an attractive pitch to hit, the manager elects the intentional base on balls. A base on balls counts as an intentional base on balls if and only if the final pitch thrown in the plate appearance is an intentional ball. For example, on August 17, 2004, following an unintentional ball, called strike, and unintentional ball, Barry Bonds was walked with two intentional balls on his third plate appearance. This was scored an intentional walk.

== Technique ==
In leagues where a pitcher must throw balls to issue an intentional walk, the catcher signals the intent to walk the batter by standing up in the catcher's box and extending one arm straight to the side away from the batter. The pitcher then throws the ball, usually over the opposite batter's box, and the catcher usually has to step to the side to catch the ball. This process is repeated four times, or fewer if the decision to issue an intentional walk is made when there are already one or more balls already on the count.

Pitching an intentional ball, like a point after touchdown in football and a free throw in basketball, is designed not to be automatic. The rules on pitcher, catcher, and batter positioning at the time of the pitch still apply, and a pitcher could potentially balk or throw a wild pitch or a passed ball.

The batter can swing at an intentional ball, but cannot leave the batter's box to follow the pitch. Swinging is rarely to the batter's advantage unless it could yield a better result than the batter reaching first base. An example of such a situation would be if there was a runner on second or third base that would not be forced to advance on an intentional walk, but could advance or even score on a base hit, sacrifice fly, or fielding error. In the Major Leagues, there were at least 12 cases from 1900 through 2011 of a batter making contact with an intentional ball. In 9 of these cases, the batter reached first base safely (six by hits, one by fielder's choice, and two by errors). The batter's team won in all nine of those instances. Most recently, on September 10, 2016, the Tampa Bay Rays opted to walk Gary Sanchez of the hosting New York Yankees. He drove an intentional ball to left field for a sacrifice fly.

== History ==
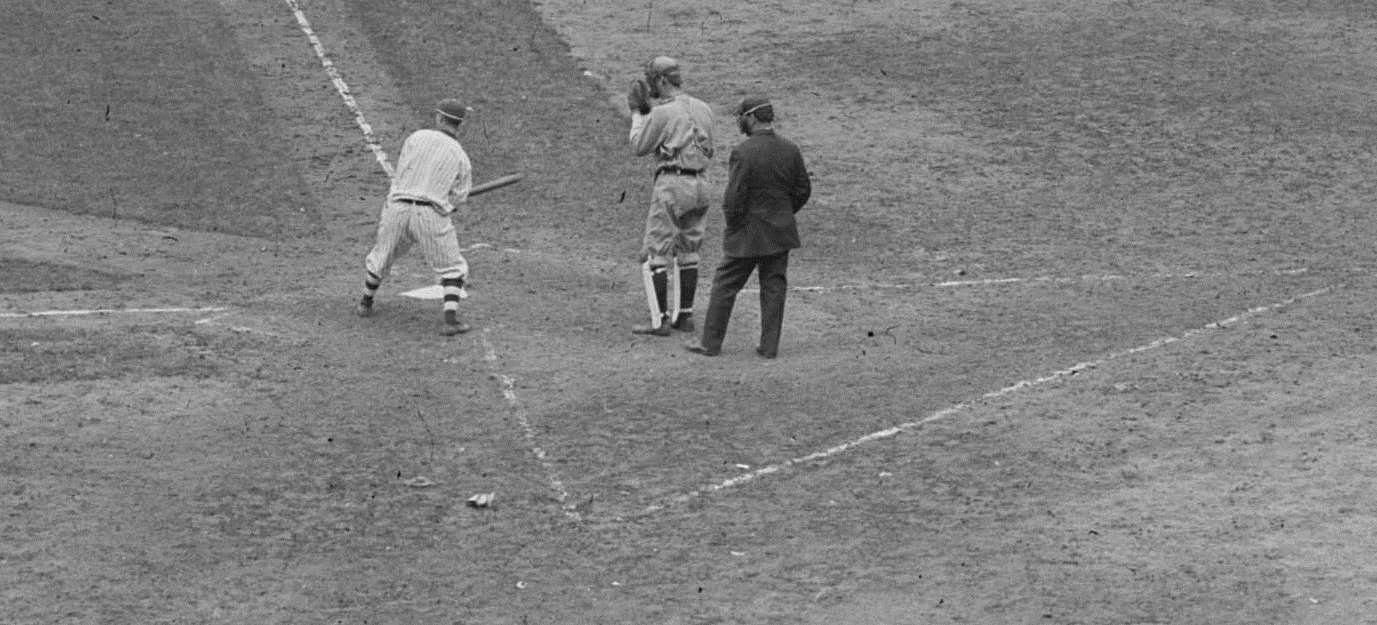
Photo showing pre-1920 catcher's lines

Before the 1920 season, the catcher was allowed to set up anywhere within a roughly 14-by-20-foot (4.3 by 6.1 m) right triangle behind home plate, the back line being 10 feet (3.0 m) behind the plate. The catcher could stand at a corner of this triangle to receive the four wide pitches, too far away for the batter to have any chance at hitting the ball. As the intentional walk became more frequent following the end of the dead ball era, batters such as Babe Ruth complained about the unfairness of it.

To give the batter a better chance (and to potentially increase scoring and attendance), major league baseball team owners (at the annual rules meeting in Chicago on February 9, 1920) initially attempted to ban the intentional base on balls by instituting a penalty that an intentional ball be counted as a balk (which would award each runner the next base). Veteran NL umpire Hank O'Day argued successfully against the proposal and the owners succeeded only in mandating that "the catcher must stand with both feet within the lines of the catcher's box until the ball leaves the pitcher's hand," a rule still in force today. The newly-redrawn catcher's box reduced the back line from 10 to 8 feet (3.0 to 2.4 m) behind the plate, and with sides 3 1/2 feet (42 in; 1.1 m) apart.

Intentional walks have been an officially tracked statistic only since 1955.

Prior to the 2017 season, as part of Major League Baseball's efforts to improve the pace of play, the rules were amended to allow a manager to order an intentional walk by simply signaling the umpire.

In 2023, Little League made a rule change (Rule 6.08 (2)(a)) restricting the number of intentional walks on a batter by informing the umpire to one per game. If a batter is to be intentionally walked a second time, the catcher must give the signal and four intentional balls must be pitched.

== Records and notable occurrences ==
Barry Bonds holds most of the records for intentional walks, including four in a nine-inning game (2004), 120 in a season (2004), 668 in his career—more than the next two players on the all-time list, Albert Pujols (309) and Hank Aaron (293), combined— and 21 in the postseason. Bonds, a prolific home run hitter, was a common target for the intentional walk. In the first month of the 2004 baseball season, Bonds drew 43 walks, 22 of them intentional. He broke his previous record of 68 intentional walks, set in 2002, on July 10, 2004 in his last appearance before the All-Star break.

There are claims that Mel Ott was also intentionally walked four times in a game against the Phillies in 1929 (see below).

Hideki Matsui drew five consecutive intentional walks in a game in Japanese High School Baseball Championship at Koshien Stadium in 1992 and became a nationwide topic of conversation.

=== With the bases loaded ===
With the bases loaded, an intentional base on balls forces in a run. This might be advisable if a team with a lead of two to four runs elects to concede one run of its lead so as not to have to pitch to a batter who might hit a home run to tie the game or take the lead.

The following table shows each batter who has gotten this treatment in the history of Major League Baseball. Cases before 1955 are researched from newspaper reports, which may be subjective.

Date	Batter	Score at time of the walk	Final score	Score sheet	Notes
1881–08–02	Abner Dalrymple	0–5 Chicago	2–11 Chicago		Team using the strategy did not go on to win the game; case neglected by historians until 2007.
1901–05–23	Nap Lajoie	11–7 Chicago	11–9 Chicago		There were no outs. Only right-handed hitter ever intentionally walked with the bases loaded.
1928–05–02	Del Bissonette	2–0 New York	2–1 New York		It is not clear whether he was simply pitched around; the contemporary press only states that "Bissonette was treated with extreme care and finally drew a base on balls."
1929–10–05	Mel Ott	3–11 New York	3–12 New York		Details below.
1944–07–23	Bill Nicholson	10–7 New York	12–10 New York		
1998–05–28	Barry Bonds	8–6 Arizona	8–7 Arizona		
2008–08–17	Josh Hamilton	7–3 Tampa Bay	7–4 Tampa Bay		
2022–04–15	Corey Seager	2–3 Texas	9–6 Los Angeles		First time team using strategy when trailing went on to win game.

The Mel Ott case, which is not included in the Baseball Almanac list, was not a result of in-game strategy. On October 5, 1929, in the first game of a Giants-Phillies doubleheader, Chuck Klein took the lead for the season home run title (box score). The Phillies' manager told the pitcher to pitch around Ott so he wouldn't challenge Klein for the title. In the top of the ninth inning of the second game, the bases were full and the Giants were already well ahead of the Phillies. "The sign came from the bench to walk Ott." When the count got to 3–0, Ott swung at two wide ones but then accepted ball four and a run was forced in.

A disputed anecdote says that, in 1926, the Cleveland Indians elected to walk Babe Ruth with the bases loaded. This angered Ruth; he swung anyway, and the result of the time at bat was a strikeout. This may refer to the game on July 10, in which Cleveland pitcher Joe Shaute purposely walked Ruth three times. Ruth was also called out once for stepping out of the batter's box. Contemporary newspaper accounts give no indication that Ruth was walked with the bases full in that game.

== Slang ==
The intentional base on balls is often referred to as a "four-fingered salute." This reference stems from the manager's holding up four fingers to signal an intentional walk to the pitcher or catcher. It is a "salute" to the batter that the manager admits to wanting to pitch to someone else instead.

== See also ==
- Pitchout
