= Pitchout =

Baseball play

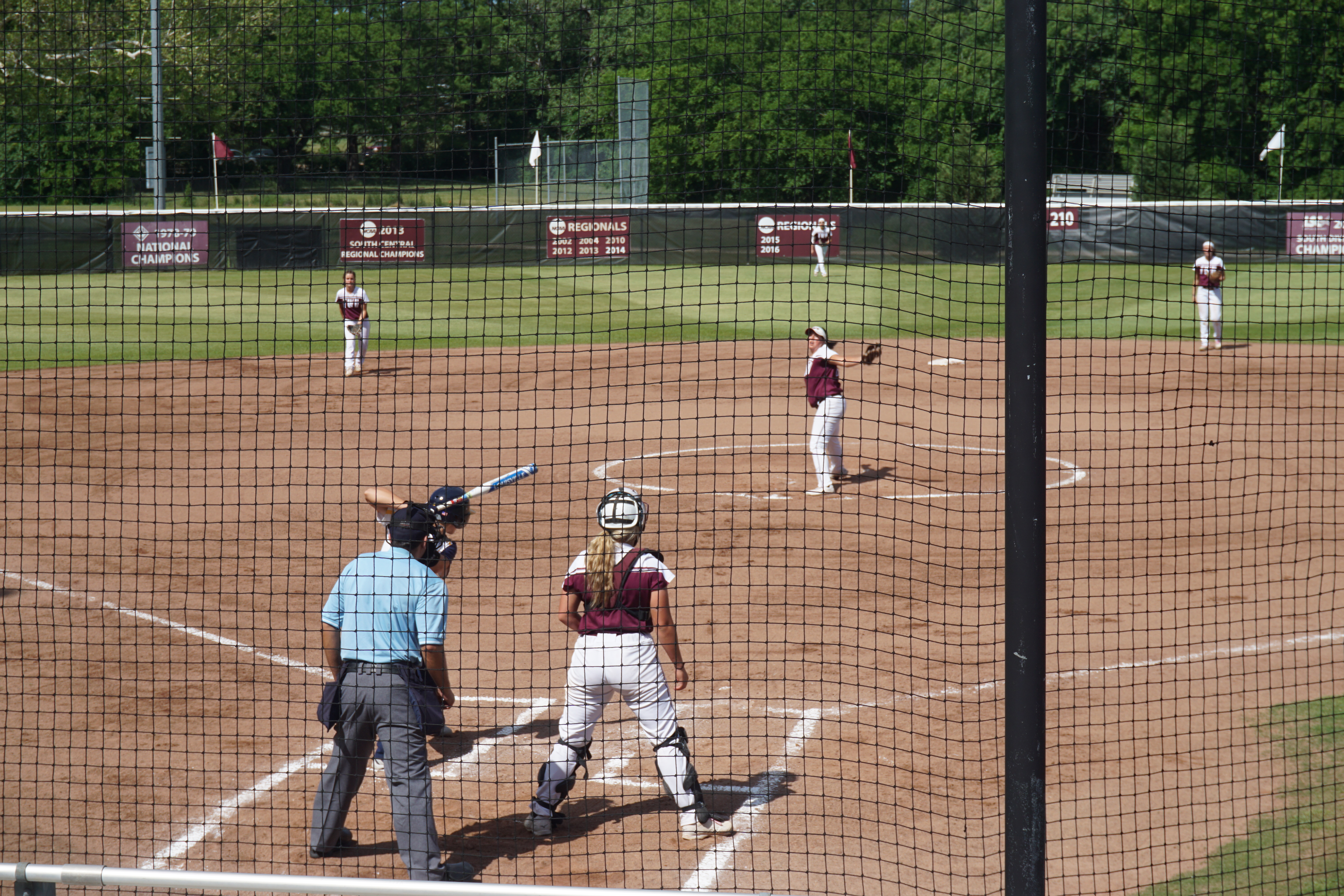
Pitchout during a Texas A&M–Commerce Lions vs. Texas Woman's Pioneers softball game

In baseball or softball, a pitchout is a ball that is intentionally thrown high and outside the strike zone with the purpose of preventing a stolen base, thwarting a hit and run, or to prevent a run-scoring play on a suicide squeeze play. The pitcher delivers the ball in such a manner for it to be unhittable and in a position where the catcher can quickly leap to his feet to catch it. A well-thrown pitchout will allow the catcher to receive the ball standing up as opposed to their usual squat, giving them a better line to throw to a base without the pitcher or the batter obstructing their vision or aim. Moreover, it is easier to throw a ball with more force from a standing position than it is from a squat, which is why most catchers leap to their feet when attempting to throw out a base stealer. A pitchout is a type of intentional ball, but differs in that a pitchout is thrown harder to give the catcher the most time to throw out the base runner.

The pitchout can be called for when the manager or catcher believes that an existing baserunner is likely to attempt a steal, and forms one of the two (with the pickoff) main countermeasures a pitcher can take against a potential stealer. A runner attempting to steal on a pitchout will have a more difficult time beating the throw to second base and almost no chance of stealing third barring a mistake by the catcher or the third baseman.

The pitchout can also be used against the hit and run. As the pitch is unhittable, the runner will have to attempt a straight steal against a prepared catcher. On a suicide squeeze play, when the runner is already running from third once the pitch has been thrown, a pitchout can be used to prevent the batter from being able to bunt the ball, allowing the catcher to tag the runner trying to score.

By 2016, pitchouts had become less frequent in Major League Baseball games than they were in the 1980s and before; sabermetricians questioned their effectiveness. Around 1990, pitchouts could be seen in 8 MLB games out of every 10 on average; by 2015, that figure has fallen to 1 out of every 10. While pitchouts do help catch stealing runners—the rate caught stealing ranged from 27% on non-pitchouts to 52% from data from 2011 to 2015—stealing in general was less common than it was in the 1980s. Thus, there was a higher risk of granting the batter a free ball when no stealing attempt was actually being made, and runners who stole frequently—the most important reason to use a pitchout—appeared in fewer games.

== See also ==
- List of baseball pitches
- Intentional walk
