= The Glory of Their Times =

Book by Lawrence Ritter

- First edition
- Author: Lawrence Ritter
- Language: English
- Publisher: Macmillan
- Publication date: September 26, 1966
- Publication place: United States
- Pages: 384 (Paperback edition)
- ISBN: 0-688-11273-0 (Paperback edition)

The Glory of Their Times: The Story of the Early Days of Baseball Told by the Men Who Played It is a 1966 book, edited by Lawrence Ritter, telling the stories of early 20th century baseball. It is widely acclaimed as one of the greatest books ever written about baseball.

== Preparation ==
Ritter got the idea for the book in 1961 upon the death of Ty Cobb, and was also influenced by the works of John and Alan Lomax, who traveled the country in the 1930s and 1940s with tape recorders seeking out old and almost forgotten American folk songs.

Ritter realized that those who played baseball in the early years of the 20th century were now old men, and he resolved to interview as many of them as he could in order to record their memories. Ritter travelled 75,000 miles to interview his subjects, sitting for hours listening to them tell their tales into his tape recorder. The book retells their stories in the first-person, as they were told to Ritter.

== Publication ==
The interviews were made between 1962 and 1966. The book was published in September 1966, following four years of research, interviews and preparation. An enlarged edition was issued in 1984, with the additions of George Gibson, Babe Herman, Specs Toporcer, and Hank Greenberg. A positive review by Wilfred Sheed in The New York Times Book Section helped propel the book, though it never hit the best-seller list. This book has been in print for most of the last 35 years, selling 360,000 copies, with royalties of nearly a quarter million dollars. Ritter presented royalties to the 22 men in the original book and their estates, and continued to write them checks into the mid-1980s. Ritter himself earned less than $35,000 on this classic. Every player in the book, along with his wife, has since died.

A vinyl album containing some of the actual recordings of the interviews was released in the 1970s. More recently, with the popularity of books-on-tape, longer versions of the recordings have been released on audiocassette and CD. The original recordings are now in the collection of the National Baseball Hall of Fame in Cooperstown, New York.

== Interviews ==
Jimmy Austin
Rube Bressler
Al Bridwell
Stan Coveleski
Sam Crawford
George Gibson

Goose Goslin
Hank Greenberg
Heinie Groh
Babe Herman
Harry Hooper

Davy Jones
Sad Sam Jones
Willie Kamm
Tommy Leach
Hans Lobert

Rube Marquard
Chief Meyers
Lefty O'Doul
Bob O'Farrell
Edd Roush

Fred Snodgrass
Specs Toporcer
Bill Wambsganss
Paul Waner
Joe Wood

Crawford, Greenberg, Roush and Waner were already members of the Baseball Hall of Fame at the time of the book's publishing. Coveleski, Goslin, Hooper and Marquard were elected after the book was published; Goslin and Marquard directly credited Ritter's book. Toporcer, who died in 1989, was the last survivor among the interviewees. As part of Ritter's research, he interviewed many ballplayers, baseball executives, and writers besides those who have chapters in his book. These individuals included Bill Veeck, Billy Werber, Benny Bengough, Marty McHale, Eliot Asinof, Fred Lieb, and George McBride.

== Documentary film ==
A documentary film for The Glory of Their Times was produced in 1971 by Ritter and Bud Greenspan, showing much of the still photography used in the book, along with vintage film footage and recordings from the audio tapes Ritter used in researching the book. After being rejected by commercial networks for several years due to Greenspan's refusal to edit for length, the film aired on PBS television in 1977.

== Sequels ==
Nine years after its publication, Donald Honig, with Ritter's blessing, penned a sequel, Baseball When the Grass Was Real. In 1976, Honig released a third book, Baseball Between the Lines: Baseball in the Forties and Fifties as Told by the Men who Played It. Both books were praised by critics.

== See also ==
- Dead-ball era
- Live-ball era
- Inside baseball (metaphor)
