= Inside baseball (metaphor) =

American slang for minutiae of a system

In North American slang, the term inside baseball refers to the minutiae and detailed inner workings of a system that are only interesting to, or appreciated by, experts, insiders, and aficionados. The phrase was originally used as a sports metaphor in political contexts, but has expanded to discussions of other topics as well. Language commentator William Safire wrote that the term refers to details about a subject that require such a specific knowledge about what is being discussed that the nuances are not understood or appreciated by outsiders.

== Origin of the term ==
The term originated in the 1890s, referring to a particular style of playing the game which relied on singles, walks, bunts, and stolen bases rather than power hitting. Within a few decades the term was being used to mean highly specialized knowledge about baseball, and by the 1950s it was being applied to politics.

== See also ==
- Jargon
