= John Waltz =

American baseball executive and manager

- Manager
- Born: January 12, 1860; Hagerstown, Maryland, U.S.
- Died: April 27, 1931 (aged 71); Baltimore, Maryland, U.S.

MLB debut
- April 29, 1892, for the Baltimore Orioles

Last MLB appearance
- May 8, 1892, for the Baltimore Orioles

MLB statistics
- Wins: 2
- Losses: 6
- Winning percentage: .250

Teams
- As Manager: Baltimore Orioles (1892)

John William Waltz (January 12, 1860 - April 29, 1931) was an American Major League Baseball manager and executive. He managed the 19th century Baltimore Orioles in 1892. He managed the team for eight games, winning two and losing six. He managed his first game April 29, 1892, after replacing George Van Haltren. He managed his last game May 8, 1892, after which he was replaced by Ned Hanlon.

== Biography ==
Waltz' original family name was "Woltz". He was born January 12, 1860, in Hagerstown, Maryland. His parents had been successful farmers in Hagerstown, but by 1880 were forced to relocate to Baltimore. After working for a jewelry dealer, Waltz became a successful furniture salesman in the 1880s. He married Bessie Bell in 1882, and had a son and a daughter by her. He purchased shares in the American Association's Baltimore Orioles.

In December 1887 Waltz, and then-Oriole manager Billy Barnie, purchased minority shares of the Orioles from owner Harry Von der Horst, and became a team vice-president. In that role, he signed Joe Dowie and Will Holland to play for the Orioles. By 1891, the rival major leagues, the National League and American Association, were at war. Waltz became a major figure in the war, proposing to put an American Association team in Chicago to challenge the established National League team in that city. He also publicly stated that the American Association would send a delegation to negotiate with the National League at the end of the 1891 season. Ultimately, the leagues agreed to form a single major league, with the surviving National League comprising eight of the former National League teams and four of the former American Association teams (including the Orioles).

Before the 1892 season, the Orioles' first in the National League, manager Barnie quit, citing a personality conflict with Waltz. Barnie's duties were split between outfielder George Van Haltren, who was to manage the team on the field, and Waltz, who oversaw financial and scheduling issues. But after the Orioles lost 10 of their first 11 games under Van Haltren, Waltz assumed duties as the team manager despite having no qualifications.

The Orioles lost six of the eight games Waltz managed and he recognized that the team needed a real "baseball man" as manager, and so relinquished these duties to Ned Hanlon, and returned to his role as team vice-president. Waltz remained the Orioles' vice-president through at least 1895, while Hanlon managed the team to National League pennants in 1893, 1894 and 1895. He died of cancer April 27, 1931, in Baltimore.

Preceded by George Van Haltren	Baltimore Orioles (NL) Managers; 1892	Succeeded by Ned Hanlon
