= Dead-ball era =

Era in the history of baseball

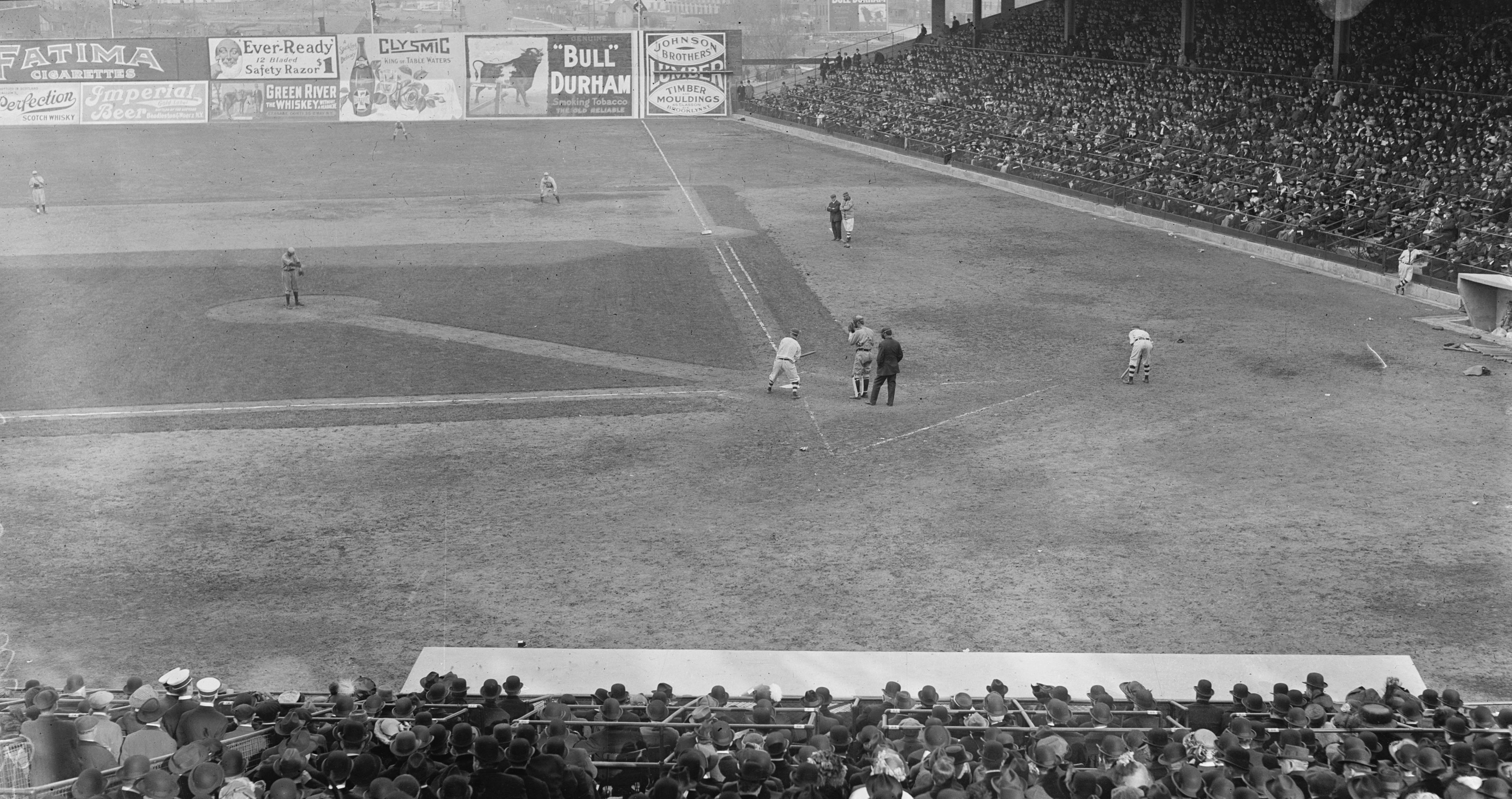
Ebbets Field in 1913

In the history of Major League Baseball (MLB), the dead-ball era was a twenty-year period, roughly from 1900 to 1920, in which run scoring was low and home runs were exceedingly rare. In 1908, the major league batting average dropped to .239, and teams averaged just 3.4 runs per game, the lowest ever. Spacious ballparks limited hitting for power, and the ball itself was "dead" both by design and from overuse. Ball scuffing and adulteration by pitchers, particularly the spitball, were allowed, putting hitters at a disadvantage.

The era ended very suddenly; by 1921, offenses were scoring 40% more runs and hitting four times as many home runs as they had in 1918. There is no consensus among baseball historians as to why, but part of the reason lay in rule changes that promoted scoring, such as alterations of ballpark dimensions and the banning of certain pitches.

== Baseball during the dead-ball era ==
Dead-ball era slugging average (highlighted area, 1900–1918 inclusive) and contributions from (top to bottom) home runs (HR), triples (3B), doubles (2B), and singles (1B)

Dead-ball era runs scored per game (highlighted area, 1900–1918 inclusive)

During the dead-ball era, baseball was much more of a strategy-driven game, using a style of play now known as small ball or inside baseball. It relied much more on plays such as stolen bases and hit-and-run than on home runs. These strategies emphasized speed, perhaps by necessity.

Low-power hits like the Baltimore chop, developed in the 1890s by the Baltimore Orioles, were used to get on base. Once on base, a runner would often steal or be bunted over to second base, then move to third base or score on a hit-and-run play. In no other era have teams stolen as many bases as in the dead-ball era.

On 13 occasions between 1900 and 1920, the league leader in home runs had fewer than 10 home runs for the season; on four occasions the league leaders had 20 or more home runs. Meanwhile, there were 20 instances where the league leader in triples had 20 or more.

Owen "Chief" Wilson set a record of 36 triples in 1912, a record that is likely one of baseball's unbreakable records, as is that of the 309 career triples of Sam Crawford set during this time.

Despite their speed, teams struggled to score during the dead-ball era. Major league cumulative batting averages ranged between .239 and .279 in the National League (NL) and between .239 and .283 in the American League (AL). The lack of power in the game also meant lower slugging percentages and on-base percentages, as pitchers could challenge hitters more without the threat of the home run. The nadir of the dead-ball era was around 1907 and 1908, with a league-wide batting average of .239, slugging average of .306, and an earned run average (ERA) under 2.40. In the latter year, the Chicago White Sox hit three home runs for the entire season, yet they finished 88–64, just a couple of games from winning the pennant.

This should prove that leather is mightier than wood

— White Sox manager Fielder Jones, after his 1906 "Hitless Wonders" won the World Series with a .230 club batting average

Some players and fans complained about the low-scoring games, and league officials sought to remedy the situation. In 1909, Ben Shibe invented the cork-centered ball, which the Reach Company—official ball supplier to the American League—began marketing. Spalding, Reach's parent company which separately supplied the National League, followed with its own cork-center ball.

The change in the ball dramatically affected play in both leagues. In 1910, the American League batting average was .243; in 1911, it rose to .273. The National League saw a jump in the league batting average from .256 in 1910 to .272 in 1912. The 1911 season happened to be the best of Ty Cobb's career; he batted .420 with 248 hits. Joe Jackson hit .408 in 1911, and the next year Cobb batted .410. These were the only .400 averages between 1902 and 1919.

In 1913, however, minor league pitcher Russ Ford noticed that a ball scuffed against a concrete wall quickly dived as it reached the batter. This so-called emery ball, together with the spitball, gave pitchers greatly increased control of the batter, especially since a single ball—rarely replaced during a game—would become increasingly scuffed as play progressed, as well as more difficult to see as it became dirtier. By 1914 run scoring was essentially back to the pre-1911 years and remained so until 1919.

In this era, Frank Baker earned the nickname "Home Run" Baker merely for hitting two home runs in the 1911 World Series; although he led the American League in home runs four times (1911–1914), his highest home run season was 1913, when he hit 12, and he finished with 96 home runs for his career. The best home run hitter of the dead-ball era was Philadelphia Phillies outfielder "Cactus" Gavvy Cravath, who led the National League in home runs six times, with a high total of 24 for the pennant-winning Phillies in 1915 and seasons of 19 home runs each in 1913 and 1914. However, Cravath played in the cavernous Baker Bowl which despite being 341-foot (104 m) to left-field and a 408-foot (124 m) shot to dead center, was a notoriously hitter-friendly park with only a short 280-foot (85 m) distance from the plate to the right-field wall. From 1900 to 1920, Cravath's 119 home runs were the most for all players in the era.

== Contributing factors ==
The following factors contributed to the dramatic decline in runs scored during the dead-ball era:

=== Foul strike rule ===
The foul strike rule was a major rule change that, in just a few years, sent baseball from a high-scoring game to a game where scoring any runs was a struggle. Under the foul strike rule, a batter who fouls off is charged with a strike unless he already has two strikes against him. The National League adopted the foul strike rule in 1901, and the American League followed suit in 1903. Prior to this rule, foul balls did not count as strikes.

=== Ball construction and use ===
Before 1921, it was common for a baseball to be in play for over 100 pitches. Players used the same ball until it started to unravel. Early baseball leagues were very cost-conscious, so fans had to throw back balls that had been hit into the stands. The longer the ball was in play, the softer it became—and hitting a heavily used, softer ball for distance is much more difficult than hitting a new, harder one. The ball was also softer to begin with, making home runs less likely.

=== Spitball ===
The ball was also hard to hit because pitchers could manipulate it before a pitch. For example, the spitball pitch was permitted in baseball until 1921. Pitchers often marked the ball, scuffed it, spat on it—anything they could to influence the ball's motion. This made the ball "dance" and curve much more than it does now, making it more difficult to hit. Tobacco juice was often added to the ball as well, which discolored it. This made the ball difficult to see, especially since baseball parks did not have lights until the late 1930s. This made both hitting and fielding more difficult.

=== Ballpark size ===
Many ballparks were large by modern standards, such as the West Side Grounds of the Chicago Cubs, which was 560 feet (170 m) to the center-field fence, and the Huntington Avenue Grounds of the Boston Red Sox, which was 635 feet (194 m) to the center-field fence. (Note: To put this in perspective, the longest home run ever hit in the entire history of Major League Baseball traveled only 575 ft (175 m) before touching down—a full 60 ft (18 m) shorter than the Huntington Avenue Grounds center-field depth.) The dimensions of Braves Field prompted Ty Cobb to say that no one would ever hit the ball out of it, and no home run was hit over the fences there until 1922, after the dead-ball era ended.

== End of the era ==
The dead-ball era ended suddenly. By 1921, offenses were scoring 40% more runs and hitting four times as many home runs as they had in 1918. Baseball historians debate the abruptness of this change, with no consensus as to its cause. Six popular theories have been advanced:

- Changes in the ball: This theory claims that owners replaced the ball with a newer, livelier ball (sometimes referred to as the "jackrabbit" ball), presumably with the intention of boosting offense and, by extension, ticket sales. The theory has been rebutted by Major League Baseball. The yarn used to wrap the core of the ball was changed prior to the 1920 season, although testing by the United States Bureau of Standards found no difference in the physical properties of the two different types of balls. The so-called "livelier" ball was actually introduced in 1911, when the league began using a cork-centered ball, as opposed to rubber, and that year the number of total home runs was 514, having been 361 the previous season. Frank Schulte became the first player of the 20th century to reach twenty home runs in a season.
- Outlawing certain pitches: Pitches now considered illegal, per MLB Rule 6.02(c), were outlawed. This included the shine ball, emery ball, and spitball (a very effective pitch throughout the dead-ball era). This theory states that without such effective pitches in the pitcher's arsenal, batters gained an advantage. When the spitball was outlawed in 1920, MLB recognized seventeen pitchers who had built their careers specializing in the spitball and permitted them to continue using it; the last pitcher allowed to do so, Burleigh Grimes, pitched until the end of 1934.
- More baseballs per game: The fatal beaning of Cleveland Indians shortstop Ray Chapman in August 1920 led to a rule that the baseball must be replaced every time that it got dirty. With a clean ball in play at all times, players no longer had to contend with a ball that "traveled through the air erratically, tended to soften in the later innings, and as it came over the plate, was very hard to see."
- Stat keeping and rule changes: In 1920, the major leagues adopted writer Fred Lieb's proposal that a game-winning home run with men on base count as a home run, even if its run is not needed to win the game. Owners tried unsuccessfully to eliminate the intentional walk. They succeeded only in changing the rules to require that the catcher be within the catcher's box when the pitcher throws‚ and that everything that happened in a protested game was added to the game record. (From 1910 to 1919‚ records in protested games were excluded.)
- Babe Ruth: One theory is that the prolific success of Babe Ruth at hitting home runs led players around the league to forsake their old methods of hitting (described above) and adopt a "free-swinging" style designed to hit the ball hard and with an uppercut stroke, with the intention of hitting more home runs. Critics of this theory claim that it does not account for the improvement in batting averages from 1918 to 1921, over which time the league average improved from .254 to .291.
- Ballpark dimensions: This theory contends that offensive success came from changes in the dimensions of the ballparks. Accurate estimates of ballpark sizes of the era can be difficult to find, however, so there is disagreement over whether the dimensions changed at all, let alone whether the change led to improved offense. A 1920 season rule change stated that balls hit over the fence in fair territory but landing foul were fair, and hence home runs rather than foul balls.

== See also ==
- Live-ball era
- Inside baseball
- The Glory of Their Times
