= Squeeze play (baseball) =

Baseball maneuver

In baseball, the squeeze play or a squeeze bunt is a maneuver consisting of a sacrifice bunt with a runner on third base. The batter bunts the ball, expecting to be thrown out at first base, but providing the runner on third base an opportunity to score. Such a bunt is most common with one out. According to Baseball Almanac, the squeeze play was invented in 1894 by George Case and Dutch Carter during a college game at Yale University. According to Hall of Famer Joe DiMaggio. a third baseman must always be alert for the squeeze play when there is a runner on third base, and might need to pick up the ball bare-handed and throw without having time to straighten up.

In a safety squeeze, the runner at third takes a lead, but does not run towards home plate until the batter makes contact bunting. A play at home plate is possible.

In a suicide squeeze, the runner takes off as soon as the pitcher begins the windup to throw the pitch, and before releasing the ball. If properly executed, and the batter bunts the ball nearly anywhere in fair territory on the ground, a play at home plate is extremely unlikely. However, if the batter misses the ball the runner will likely be tagged out, and if the batter pops the ball up a double play is likely.

These plays are often used in the late innings of a close game to score a tying, winning, or insurance run. A pitcher's typical defense against a squeeze play, if he sees the batter getting into position to attempt a bunt, is to throw a high pitch that is difficult to bunt on the ground. Alternatively, if the batter is left-handed and the pitcher anticipates a suicide squeeze, the pitcher can throw a pitchout low and away to make it easy for the catcher to tag out the runner.

Billy Martin and Leo Durocher were two managers who liked to use the squeeze play.
