= George Van Haltren =

American baseball player (1866–1945)

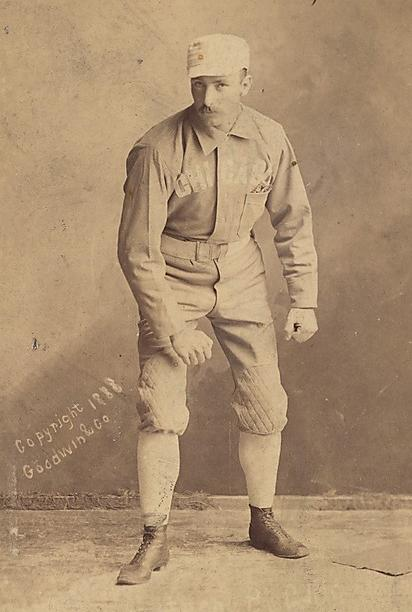
- Van Haltren in 1888
- Outfielder / Pitcher
- Born: March 30, 1866; St. Louis, Missouri, U.S.
- Died: October 1, 1945 (aged 79); Oakland, California, U.S.
- Batted: Left Threw: Left

MLB debut
- June 27, 1887, for the Chicago White Stockings

Last MLB appearance
- September 26, 1903, for the New York Giants

MLB statistics
- Batting average: .316
- Hits: 2,544
- Home runs: 69
- Runs batted in: 1,015
- Stolen bases: 583
- Win–loss record: 40–31
- Earned run average: 4.05
- Strikeouts: 281
- Stats at Baseball Reference

Teams
- Chicago White Stockings (1887–1889); Brooklyn Ward's Wonders (1890); Baltimore Orioles (1891–1892); Pittsburgh Pirates (1892–1893); New York Giants (1894–1903)

Career highlights and awards
- NL stolen base leader (1900)

George Edward Martin Van Haltren (March 30, 1866 – October 1, 1945) was an American center fielder in Major League Baseball. In his 17-year career, lasting from 1887 through 1903, he played for the Chicago White Stockings, Brooklyn Ward's Wonders, Baltimore Orioles, Pittsburgh Pirates, and New York Giants. A .316 career hitter, Van Haltren recorded 2,544 career hits, fifth most in major league history when he retired.

== Early life ==
Van Haltren was born in St. Louis, Missouri, in 1866. In 1868, his family moved to Oakland, California. Van Haltren played baseball as a child and became a pitcher. His play attracted the attention of the major leagues, and in 1887, he signed with the Chicago White Stockings.

== Major League Baseball career ==
Van Haltren made his major league debut in June 1887. He was a pitcher and outfielder that season and had a win–loss record of 11–7 and a batting average of .203. The following year, he went 13–13 and batted .283. As a full-time left fielder in 1889, Van Haltren batted .322 with 126 runs scored and 81 runs batted in. He then signed with the Brooklyn Ward's Wonders of the Players' League and pitched and played right field for them. He went 15–10 and batted .335. After the 1890 season, Van Haltren joined the American Association's Baltimore Orioles. He played at shortstop and fielded poorly, but he batted .318. In 1892, Van Haltren became the player-manager of the National League's Baltimore club. He managed the team to a 1–10 record before being replaced. Late in the season, he was sent to Pittsburgh in exchange for Joe Kelley and $2,000. He batted .293 that year. In 1893, he batted .338 and scored 129 runs in 124 games.

In November 1893, Van Haltren was sold to the New York Giants for $2,500. He became the Giants' center fielder and batted .331 with 109 runs scored and a career-high 105 runs batted in. He also helped the team win the 1894 Temple Cup. Van Haltren then batted over .300 every year from 1895 to 1901. During that time, he led the NL in triples once, stolen bases once, and outfield assists three times. According to Bill James, he had the best outfield throwing arm of the 1890s. In May 1902, Van Haltren broke his ankle, and the injury ended his season. He hit .257 the following year and was released by the Giants. In his 17-year major league career, he batted .316 with 2,544 hits, 1,642 runs scored, and 583 stolen bases. By the end of 1899, he ranked 10th all-time in hits and 14th in runs scored. When he retired in 1903, he was 5th in hits and sixth in runs. His 1,642 runs in just 1,990 games played is the third most for all players who played less than 2,000 games in MLB history.

== Later life ==
Van Haltren returned to Oakland. In 1904, he became the center fielder and manager of the Pacific Coast League's Seattle Siwashes. He batted .270 in 933 at bats. The following season, Van Haltren became the center fielder and manager of the Oakland Oaks. He stayed with the Oaks through the middle of the 1909 season. Van Haltren later was a scout for the Pirates for five years, after which he went to work in Oakland area construction as a latheman. He owned and managed several rental properties in and around Oakland.

In 1889, Van Haltren married Blanche O'Brien. They had two daughters, Mary Elizabeth (born in 1890) and Dorothy (born in 1895). Van Haltren died in Oakland in 1945.

== See also ==
- List of Major League Baseball career hits leaders
- List of Major League Baseball career triples leaders
- List of Major League Baseball career runs scored leaders
- List of Major League Baseball career runs batted in leaders
- List of Major League Baseball career stolen bases leaders
- List of Major League Baseball annual saves leaders
- List of Major League Baseball annual stolen base leaders
- List of Major League Baseball annual triples leaders
- List of Major League Baseball player-managers

Preceded by Billy Barnie	Baltimore Orioles (NL) managers 1892	Succeeded by John Waltz
