= Lawrence Ritter =

American sportswriter

- Born: May 23, 1922; New York City, U.S.
- Died: February 15, 2004 (aged 81); New York City, U.S.
- Education: Indiana University Bloomington (B.A.); University of Wisconsin–Madison (Ph.D.)
- Occupations: Professor, author, sportswriter
- Children: 1
- Writing career
- Subjects: Business, Sports
- Notable work: The Glory of Their Times

Lawrence Stanley Ritter (May 23, 1922 – February 15, 2004) was an American writer who wrote on economics and baseball.

== Career ==
Ritter was a professor of economics and finance at New York University, and was chairman of the Department of Finance at the Graduate School of Business Administration. He also edited The Journal of Finance from 1964 to 1966. In 1970, Ritter served as president of the American Finance Association.

He co-authored Principles of Money, Banking, and Financial Markets with William L. Silber and Gregory F. Udell. The book has undergone twelve editions. It has been a college textbook on Finance since it was first published in 1974.

Ritter wrote the sports book The Glory of Their Times (1966, updated 1984). He collaborated with another baseball historian, Donald Honig, on The Image of Their Greatness (1979) and The 100 Greatest Baseball Players of All Time (1981). The latter featured several players subsequently dropped in favor of new players on later all-time greats lists.

In researching The Glory of Their Times, Ritter travelled a total distance of 75,000 miles (121,000 km) to interview his subjects. Ritter's "Existential" style of interviewing was to allow his subjects to reminisce freely. The style included not probing them on anything including questions about specific games or specific players. Ritter's technique was to get his interviewee comfortable around him and tape record while he remained silent. He is known for finding and interviewing Sam Crawford, who played in the outfield with Ty Cobb in Detroit. He located him based on a hint to "drive between 175 and 225 miles north of Los Angeles" by Crawford's wife. Ritter eventually located him in a laundromat in Baywood Park, California.

In 2010, Ritter was one of a select few baseball historians and writers who was awarded the first Henry Chadwick Award by the Society for American Baseball Research. The award honors baseball's prolific researchers who made an impact on baseball and its history through research and other vital means.

== Personal life ==
Ritter died at age of 81 in New York City.

== Books ==
=== Baseball ===
- Ritter, Lawrence S. (1966). The Glory of Their Times: The Story of the Early Days of Baseball Told by the Men Who Played It. Macmillan. ISBN 978-0688112738.
- Ritter, Lawrence S.; Honig, Donald (1981). The 100 Greatest Baseball Players of All Time. Crown Publishers. ISBN 978-0517543009.
- Ritter, Lawrence S. (1984). The Image of Their Greatness: An Illustrated History of Baseball from 1900 to the Present. Crown Publishers. ISBN 978-0517587287.
- Ritter, Lawrence S. (1992). Lost Ballparks: A Celebration of Baseball's Legendary Fields. Avery Publishing. ISBN 978-0670838110.
- Ritter, Lawrence S.; Merkin, Richard (1995). Leagues Apart: The Men and Times of the Negro Baseball Leagues. HarperCollins. ISBN 978-0688133160.
- Ritter, Lawrence S. (1998). East Side, West Side: Tales of New York Sporting Life, 1910-1960. Total Sports Publishing. ISBN 978-0965694964.

=== Economics ===
- Ritter, Lawrence S. (2006) [1961]. Money and Economic Activity, Readings in Money and Banking (1st ed.). Houghton Mifflin. ISBN 039-5050987.
- Ritter, Lawrence S. (1974). Principles of Money, Banking, and Financial Markets (1st ed.). Basic Books. ISBN 046-5063357.
