= Billy Barnie =

American baseball player and manager (1853–1900)

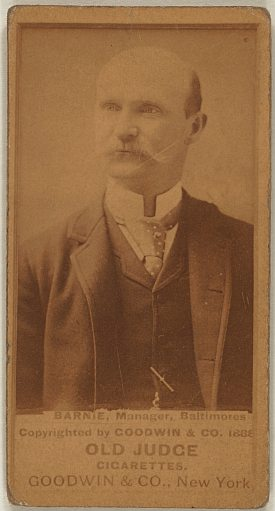
- Manager / Catcher / Right fielder
- Born: January 26, 1853; New York City, New York, U.S.
- Died: July 15, 1900 (aged 47); Hartford, Connecticut, U.S.
- Batted: Unknown Threw: Right

Major-league debut
- May 7, 1874, for the Hartford Dark Blues

Last major-league appearance
- June 28, 1886, for the Baltimore Orioles

Major-league statistics
- Batting average: .171
- Home runs: 0
- Runs Batted In: 23
- Stats at Baseball Reference

Teams
- As player: Hartford Dark Blues (1874); Keokuk Westerns (1875); New York Mutuals (1875); Baltimore Orioles (1883, 1886); As manager: Baltimore Orioles (1883–1891); Washington Senators (1892); Louisville Colonels (1893–1894); Brooklyn Bridegrooms (1897–1898)

William Harrison Barnie (January 26, 1853 – July 15, 1900), nicknamed "Bald Billy", was an American professional baseball player and manager. Born in New York City, he played as a right fielder in the National Association in 1874–1875. In 1883 he became manager of the Baltimore Orioles of the American Association; he appeared as a backup catcher that season, and also played two games in 1886, but otherwise did not take the field. After leaving the Orioles following the 1891 season, he managed the Washington Senators (1892), Louisville Colonels (1893–1894) and Brooklyn Bridegrooms (1897–1898). His career managerial record consists of 632 wins and 810 losses. His best finish was third place with the 1887 Orioles.

Barnie died in Hartford, Connecticut at the age of 47, of pneumonia complicated by asthmatic bronchitis, and was interred at Green-Wood Cemetery in Brooklyn, New York.

== See also ==
- List of Major League Baseball player–managers
