= Inside baseball (strategy) =

Strategy in baseball

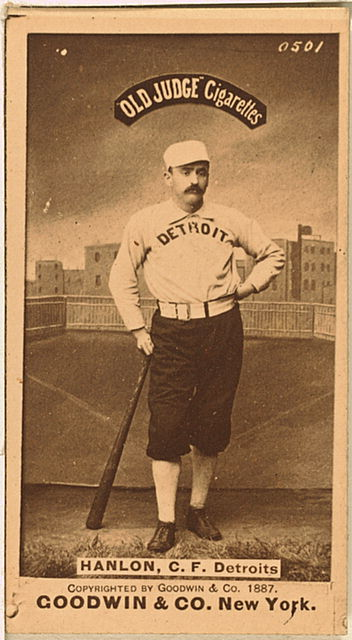
Ned Hanlon

Inside baseball is a strategy in baseball involving tactics that keep the ball in the infield. The strategy specifically did not rely on big hits and home runs and became the primary offensive strategy during the dead-ball era. The modern-day equivalent is small ball.

It was developed by the 19th-century Baltimore Orioles and promoted by John McGraw. In his book, My Thirty Years In Baseball, McGraw credits the development of the "inside baseball" to manager Ned Hanlon. In the 1890s, this type of play was referred to as "Oriole baseball" or "Baltimore baseball".

== Description ==
Inside baseball is an offensive strategy that focuses on teamwork and good execution. It usually centers on tactics that keep the ball in the infield: walks, base hits, bunts, and stolen bases. One such play, where the batter deliberately strikes the pitched ball downward onto the infield surface with sufficient force such that the ball rebounds skyward, allowing the batter to reach first base safely before the opposing team can field the ball, remains known as a Baltimore chop.

Another term in use in the 1890s for this style was "scientific baseball", referring to calculated one-run game strategies based on intelligent, cooperative actions of the players. A 1911 article in The New York Times described "scientific baseball":

Scientific baseball of to-day – "inside ball" they call it – consists in making the opposing team think you are going to make a play one way, then shift suddenly and do it in another.

McGraw in his book writes:

"So-called inside baseball is mostly bunk. It is merely working out of definite plans that the public does not observe".

Critics also note that the reputation of the Orioles for the "inside baseball" grew only in retrospect. At the time, the Orioles were more famous for deliberately playing dirty.

== See also ==
- Glossary of baseball terms
