= 1903 St. Louis Cardinals season =

Major League Baseball season

1903 St. Louis Cardinals
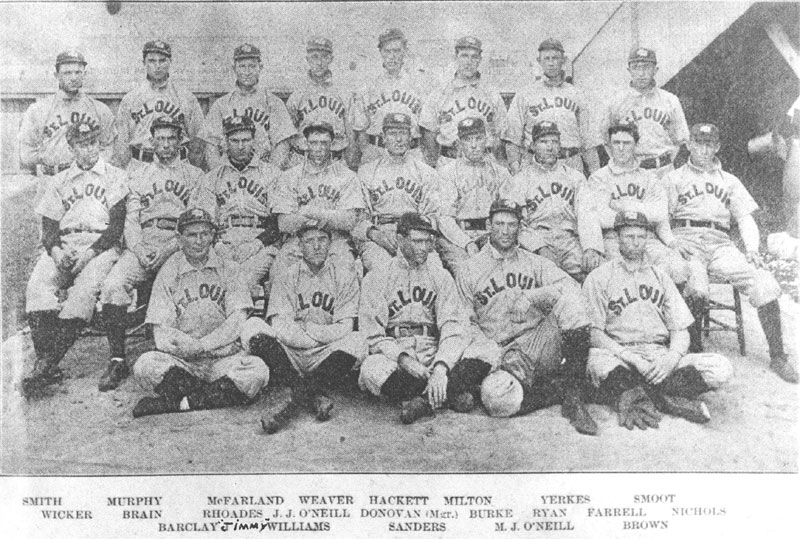
- League: National League
- Ballpark: League Park
- City: St. Louis, Missouri
- Record: 43–94 (.314)
- League place: 8th
- Owners: Frank Robison and Stanley Robison
- Managers: Patsy Donovan

The 1903 St. Louis Cardinals season was the team's 22nd season in St. Louis, Missouri and the 12th season in the National League. The Cardinals went 43–94 during the season and finished eighth in the National League.

== Regular season ==
=== Season standings ===
National League
Team	W	L	Pct.	GB	Home	Road
Pittsburgh Pirates	91	49	.650	—	46‍–‍24	45‍–‍25
New York Giants	84	55	.604	6½	41‍–‍27	43‍–‍28
Chicago Cubs	82	56	.594	8	45‍–‍28	37‍–‍28
Cincinnati Reds	74	65	.532	16½	41‍–‍35	33‍–‍30
Brooklyn Superbas	70	66	.515	19	40‍–‍33	30‍–‍33
Boston Beaneaters	58	80	.420	32	31‍–‍35	27‍–‍45
Philadelphia Phillies	49	86	.363	39½	25‍–‍33	24‍–‍53
St. Louis Cardinals	43	94	.314	46½	22‍–‍45	21‍–‍49

=== Record vs. opponents ===
1903 National League record Sources:
Team	BSN	BRO	CHC	CIN	NYG	PHI	PIT	STL
Boston	—	9–11	7–13–1	7–13	8–12	10–8–1	5–15	12–8
Brooklyn	11–9	—	8–12	10–10	7–12–2	11–8–1	9–11	14–4–1
Chicago	13–7–1	12–8	—	9–11	8–12	12–6	12–8	16–4
Cincinnati	13–7	10–10	11–9	—	12–10	12–8–2	4–16	12–7
New York	12–8	12–7–2	12–8	8–12	—	15–5	10–10	15–5–1
Philadelphia	8–10–1	8–11–1	6–12	8–12–2	5–15	—	4–16–1	10–10
Pittsburgh	15–5	11–9	8–12	16–4	10–10	16–4–1	—	15–5
St. Louis	8–12	4–14–1	4–16	7–12	5–15–1	10–10	5–15	—

=== Roster ===
1903 St. Louis Cardinals
Roster
Pitchers: Harry Betts; Mordecai Brown; Clarence Currie; Pat Hynes; John Lovett; Chappie McFarland; Larry Milton; Charlie Moran; Ed Murphy; Mike O'Neill; Bob Rhoads; War Sanders; Ed Taylor; Bob Wicker; Stan Yerkes	Catchers: Jack Coveney; Jack O'Neill; Jack Ryan; Art Weaver; Infielders: Harry Berte; Dave Brain; Jimmy Burke; Lee DeMontreville; John Farrell; Jim Hackett; Art Nichols; Lon Ury; Otto Williams	Outfielders: George Barclay; Patsy Donovan; Jack Dunleavy; Homer Smoot	Manager: Patsy Donovan

== Player stats ==
=== Batting ===
==== Starters by position ====
Note: Pos = Position; G = Games played; AB = At bats; H = Hits; Avg. = Batting average; HR = Home runs; RBI = Runs batted in

Pos	Player	G	AB	H	Avg.	HR	RBI
C	Jack O'Neill	75	246	58	.236	0	27
1B	Jim Hackett	99	351	80	.228	0	36
2B	John Farrell	130	519	141	.272	1	32
3B	Jimmy Burke	115	431	123	.285	0	42
SS	Dave Brain	119	464	107	.231	1	60
OF	Homer Smoot	129	500	148	.296	4	49
OF	George Barclay	108	419	104	.248	0	42
OF	Patsy Donovan	105	410	134	.327	0	39

==== Other batters ====
Note: G = Games played; AB = At bats; H = Hits; Avg. = Batting average; HR = Home runs; RBI = Runs batted in

Player	G	AB	H	Avg.	HR	RBI
Jack Ryan	67	227	54	.238	1	10
Jack Dunleavy	67	193	48	.249	0	10
Otto Williams	53	187	38	.203	0	9
Art Nichols	36	120	23	.192	0	9
Lee DeMontreville	26	70	17	.243	0	7
Art Weaver	16	49	12	.245	0	5
Harry Berte	4	15	5	.333	0	1
Jack Coveney	4	14	2	.143	0	0
Lon Ury	2	7	1	.143	0	0

=== Pitching ===
==== Starting pitchers ====
Note: G = Games pitched; IP = Innings pitched; W = Wins; L = Losses; ERA = Earned run average; SO = Strikeouts

Player	G	IP	W	L	ERA	SO
Chappie McFarland	28	229.0	9	19	3.07	76
Mordecai Brown	26	201.0	9	13	2.60	83
Clarence Currie	22	148.0	4	12	4.01	52
Mike O'Neill	19	145.0	4	13	3.79	39
Bob Rhoads	17	129.0	5	8	4.60	52
Ed Murphy	15	106.0	4	8	3.31	16
Jack Dunleavy	14	102.0	6	8	4.06	51
Jim Hackett	7	48.1	1	3	3.72	21
War Sanders	8	40.0	1	6	6.08	9
Harry Betts	1	9.0	0	1	10.00	2
Pat Hynes	1	9.0	0	1	4.00	1
Stan Yerkes	1	5.0	0	1	1.80	3

==== Other pitchers ====
Note: G = Games pitched; IP = Innings pitched; W = Wins; L = Losses; ERA = Earned run average; SO = Strikeouts

Player	G	IP	W	L	ERA	SO
Charlie Moran	3	24.0	0	1	5.25	7
John Lovett	3	5.0	0	0	5.40	3

==== Relief pitchers ====
Note: G = Games pitched; W = Wins; L = Losses; SV = Saves; ERA = Earned run average; SO = Strikeouts

Player	G	W	L	SV	ERA	SO
Bob Wicker	1	0	0	0	0.00	3
Larry Milton	1	0	0	0	2.25	0
Ed Taylor	1	0	0	0	0.00	1
