= 1903 Pittsburgh Pirates season =

1903 Pittsburgh Pirates
- National League champions
- League: National League
- Ballpark: Exposition Park
- City: Allegheny, Pennsylvania
- Owners: Barney Dreyfuss
- Managers: Fred Clarke

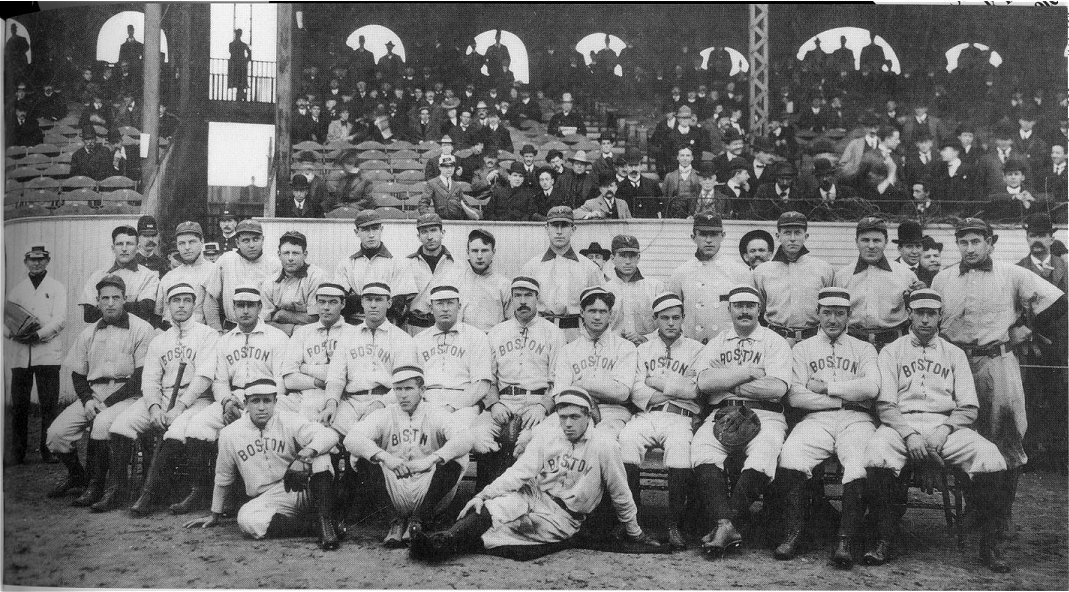
Pittsburgh Pirates (standing) and Boston Americans (sitting) at the 1903 World Series

The 1903 Pittsburgh (Note: In the early 20th century and earlier, the name of Pittsburgh was spelled with and without the 'h'.) Pirates season was the 22nd year the Pittsburgh Pirates played in Major League Baseball. The club finished its season as National League champions, beating the second-place New York Giants by 6 1/2 games.

The team went on to participate in the World Series, the first to be played between the champions of the National League and American League. The Pirates started off well, winning 3 of the first four games, but the Boston Americans won the last four straight to win the series five games to three. The Pirates set a record of 56 consecutive innings without allowing the opposing team to score a run, a record that still stands today.

== Offseason ==
- Prior to 1903 season: Jack O'Connor jumped from the Pirates to the New York Highlanders.

== Regular season ==
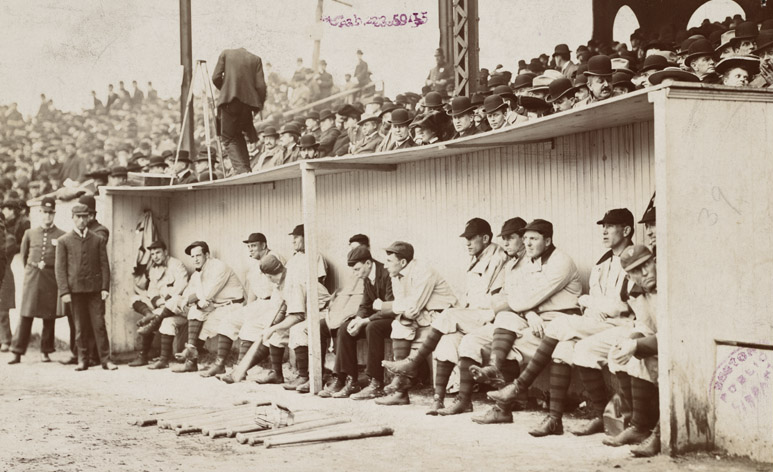
Pirates' bench at the World Series

=== Season standings ===
National League
Team	W	L	Pct.	GB	Home	Road
Pittsburgh Pirates	91	49	.650	—	46‍–‍24	45‍–‍25
New York Giants	84	55	.604	6½	41‍–‍27	43‍–‍28
Chicago Cubs	82	56	.594	8	45‍–‍28	37‍–‍28
Cincinnati Reds	74	65	.532	16½	41‍–‍35	33‍–‍30
Brooklyn Superbas	70	66	.515	19	40‍–‍33	30‍–‍33
Boston Beaneaters	58	80	.420	32	31‍–‍35	27‍–‍45
Philadelphia Phillies	49	86	.363	39½	25‍–‍33	24‍–‍53
St. Louis Cardinals	43	94	.314	46½	22‍–‍45	21‍–‍49

=== Record vs. opponents ===
1903 National League record Sources:
Team	BSN	BRO	CHC	CIN	NYG	PHI	PIT	STL
Boston	—	9–11	7–13–1	7–13	8–12	10–8–1	5–15	12–8
Brooklyn	11–9	—	8–12	10–10	7–12–2	11–8–1	9–11	14–4–1
Chicago	13–7–1	12–8	—	9–11	8–12	12–6	12–8	16–4
Cincinnati	13–7	10–10	11–9	—	12–10	12–8–2	4–16	12–7
New York	12–8	12–7–2	12–8	8–12	—	15–5	10–10	15–5–1
Philadelphia	8–10–1	8–11–1	6–12	8–12–2	5–15	—	4–16–1	10–10
Pittsburgh	15–5	11–9	8–12	16–4	10–10	16–4–1	—	15–5
St. Louis	8–12	4–14–1	4–16	7–12	5–15–1	10–10	5–15	—

=== Notable transactions ===
- May 28, 1903: Reddy Grey was acquired by the Pirates on loan from the Worcester Riddlers.

=== Roster ===
1903 Pittsburgh Pirates
Roster
Pitchers: Ed Doheny; Cy Falkenberg; Brickyard Kennedy; Sam Leever; Lew Moren; Jack Pfiester; Deacon Phillippe; Doc Scanlan; Gus Thompson; Bucky Veil; Kaiser Wilhelm; Lave Winham	Catchers: Fred Carisch; Ed Phelps; Harry Smith; Art Weaver; Infielders: Kitty Bransfield; Otto Krueger; Tommy Leach; Hans Lobert; Joe Marshall; Claude Ritchey; Honus Wagner	Outfielders: Ginger Beaumont; Fred Clarke; Gene Curtis; Ernie Diehl; Lou Gertenrich; Reddy Grey; Solly Hofman; George Merritt; Jimmy Sebring	Manager: Fred Clarke

== Player stats ==
=== Batting ===
==== Starters by position ====
Note: Pos = Position; G = Games played; AB = At bats; H = Hits; Avg. = Batting average; HR = Home runs; RBI = Runs batted in

Pos	Player	G	AB	H	Avg.	HR	RBI
C	Ed Phelps	81	273	77	.282	2	31
1B	Kitty Bransfield	127	505	134	.265	2	57
2B	Claude Ritchey	138	506	145	.287	0	59
SS	Honus Wagner	129	512	182	.355	5	101
3B	Tommy Leach	127	507	151	.298	7	87
OF	Fred Clarke	104	427	150	.351	5	70
OF	Ginger Beaumont	141	613	209	.341	7	68
OF	Jimmy Sebring	124	506	140	.277	4	64

==== Other batters ====
Note: G = Games played; AB = At bats; H = Hits; Avg. = Batting average; HR = Home runs; RBI = Runs batted in

Player	G	AB	H	Avg.	HR	RBI
Otto Krueger	80	256	63	.246	1	28
Harry Smith	61	212	37	.175	0	19
Art Weaver	16	48	11	.229	0	3
George Merritt	9	27	4	.148	0	3
Joe Marshall	10	23	6	.261	0	2
Gene Curtis	5	19	8	.421	0	3
Fred Carisch	5	18	6	.333	1	5
Hans Lobert	5	13	1	.077	0	0
Lou Gertenrich	1	3	0	.000	0	0
Reddy Grey	1	3	1	.333	0	1
Ernie Diehl	1	3	1	.333	0	0
Solly Hofman	3	2	0	.000	0	0

=== Pitching ===
==== Starting pitchers ====
Note: G = Games pitched; IP = Innings pitched; W = Wins; L = Losses; ERA = Earned run average; SO = Strikeouts

Player	G	IP	W	L	ERA	SO
Deacon Phillippe	36	289.1	25	9	2.43	123
Sam Leever	36	284.1	25	7	2.06	90
Ed Doheny	27	222.2	16	8	3.19	75
Brickyard Kennedy	18	125.1	9	6	3.45	39
Kaiser Wilhelm	12	86.0	5	3	3.24	20
Lave Winham	5	36.0	3	1	2.25	22
Jack Pfiester	3	19.0	0	3	6.16	15
Doc Scanlan	1	9.0	0	1	4.00	0
Lew Moren	1	6.0	0	1	9.00	2

==== Other pitchers ====
Note: G = Games pitched; IP = Innings pitched; W = Wins; L = Losses; ERA = Earned run average; SO = Strikeouts

Player	G	IP	W	L	ERA	SO
Bucky Veil	12	70.2	5	3	3.82	20
Cy Falkenberg	10	56.0	1	5	3.86	24

==== Relief pitchers ====
Note: G = Games pitched; W = Wins; L = Losses; ERA = Earned run average; SO = Strikeouts

Player	G	W	L	ERA	SO
George Merritt	1	0	0	2.25	2

== 1903 World Series ==
Pittsburgh Pirates vs. Boston Americans

=== Game 1 ===
October 1, 1903, at Huntington Avenue Grounds in Boston, Massachusetts

The Pirates started Game 1 strong, scoring six runs in the first four innings. They extended their lead to 7–0 on a solo home run by Jimmy Sebring in the 7th, the first home run in World Series history. Boston tried to mount a comeback in the last three innings, but it was too little, too late, as they ended up losing by a score of 7–3 in the first ever World Series game. Both starting pitchers, Deacon Phillippe of the Pirates and Cy Young of Boston, threw complete games, with Phillippe striking out 10 and Young fanning 5, but Young also gave up twice as many hits and allowed 3 earned runs to Phillippe's 2.

Team	1	2	3	4	5	6	7	8	9	R	H	E
Pittsburgh	4	0	1	1	0	0	1	0	0	7	12	2
Boston	0	0	0	0	0	0	2	0	1	3	6	4
W: Deacon Phillippe (1–0) L: Cy Young (0–1)
HR: PIT – Jimmy Sebring (1)

=== Game 2 ===
October 2, 1903, at Huntington Avenue Grounds in Boston, Massachusetts

After starting out strong in Game 1, the Pirates simply shut down offensively, managing to get a meager 3 hits, all of which were singles. Pirates starter Sam Leever went only one inning and gave up 3 hits and 2 runs before being replaced by Bucky Veil in the second inning due to injury, who finished the game for Pittsburgh. Bill Dinneen struck out 11 and pitched a complete game for the Americans, while Patsy Dougherty hit home runs in the first and sixth innings to produce 2 of the Boston's 3 runs.

Team	1	2	3	4	5	6	7	8	9	R	H	E
Pittsburgh	0	0	0	0	0	0	0	0	0	0	3	2
Boston	2	0	0	0	0	1	0	0	X	3	8	0
W: Bill Dinneen (1–0) L: Sam Leever (0–1)
HR: BOS – Patsy Dougherty 2 (2)

=== Game 3 ===
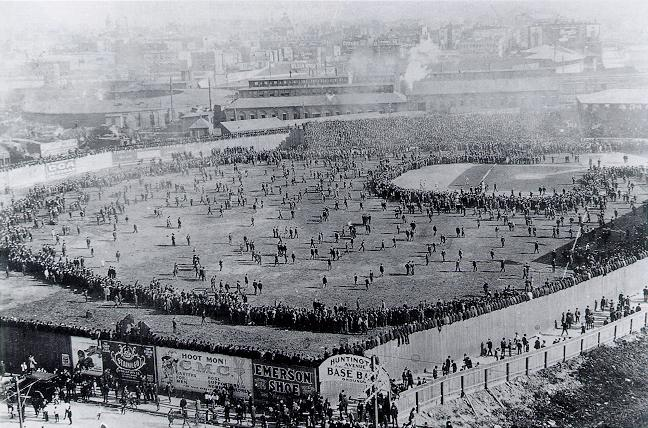
A crowd overflows the playing field prior to Game 3 of the 1903 World Series

October 3, 1903, at Huntington Avenue Grounds in Boston, Massachusetts

Deacon Phillippe, pitching on only one day rest, started Game 3 for the Pirates, and did not let them down as he pitched his second complete-game victory of the series to put the Pirates up two games to one.

Team	1	2	3	4	5	6	7	8	9	R	H	E
Pittsburgh	0	1	2	0	0	0	0	1	0	4	7	0
Boston	0	0	0	1	0	0	0	1	0	2	4	2
W: Deacon Phillippe (2–0) L: Tom Hughes (0–1)

=== Game 4 ===
October 6, 1903, at Exposition Park in Allegheny, Pennsylvania

After two days of rest, Deacon Phillippe was ready to pitch his second straight game. He threw his third complete-game victory of the series against Bill Dinneen, who was pitching in his second start of the series. However, Phillippe's second straight victory was almost not to be, as the Americans, down 5–1 in the top of the ninth, staged a rally to bring the game within one. The comeback attempt failed, though, as Phillippe managed to put an end to it and give the Pirates a commanding 3–1 series lead.

Team	1	2	3	4	5	6	7	8	9	R	H	E
Boston	0	0	0	0	1	0	0	0	3	4	9	1
Pittsburgh	1	0	0	0	1	0	3	0	X	5	12	1
W: Deacon Phillippe (3–0) L: Bill Dinneen (1–1)

=== Game 5 ===
October 7, 1903, at Exposition Park in Allegheny, Pennsylvania

Game 5 was a pitcher's duel for the first five innings, with Boston's Cy Young and Pittsburgh's Brickyard Kennedy giving up no runs. That changed at the top of the sixth, however, when the Americans scored a then-record 6 runs that inning. Young, on the other hand, managed to keep his shutout intact before finally giving up a pair of runs in the bottom of the eighth. He went the distance and struck out four for his first World Series win.

Team	1	2	3	4	5	6	7	8	9	R	H	E
Boston	0	0	0	0	0	6	4	1	0	11	13	2
Pittsburgh	0	0	0	0	0	0	0	2	0	2	6	4
W: Cy Young (1–1) L: Brickyard Kennedy (0–1)

=== Game 6 ===
October 8, 1903, at Exposition Park in Allegheny, Pennsylvania

Game 6 featured a rematch between the starters of Game 2, Bill Dinneen (Boston) and Sam Leever (Pittsburgh). This time, Leever would pitch the entire game, but despite throwing a complete game he was outmatched by Dinneen, who ended up with his second complete-game victory of the series. After losing three of the first four games of the World Series, the underdog Boston Americans had tied the series at three games apiece.

Team	1	2	3	4	5	6	7	8	9	R	H	E
Boston	0	0	3	0	2	0	1	0	0	6	10	1
Pittsburgh	0	0	0	0	0	0	3	0	0	3	10	3
W: Bill Dinneen (2–1) L: Sam Leever (0–2)

=== Game 7 ===
October 10, 1903, at Exposition Park in Allegheny, Pennsylvania

The fourth and final game in Allegheny City saw Deacon Phillippe start his fourth game of the series for Pittsburgh. This time, however, he wouldn't fare as well as he did in his first three starts. Cy Young, pitching in his third start of the series, would face a much more favorable fate, holding the Pirates to only three runs.

Team	1	2	3	4	5	6	7	8	9	R	H	E
Boston	2	0	0	2	0	2	0	1	0	7	11	4
Pittsburgh	0	0	0	1	0	1	0	0	1	3	10	3
WP: Cy Young (2–1) LP: Deacon Phillippe (3–1)

=== Game 8 ===
October 13, 1903, at Huntington Avenue Grounds in Boston, Massachusetts

The final game of the inaugural World Series started out as an intense pitcher's duel, with no runs being scored until the fourth inning – when a Hobe Ferris single scored two runners. Deacon Phillippe started his fifth and final game of the series, while Bill Dinneen started his fourth game of the series. As he did in Game 2, Dinneen threw a complete-game shutout while striking out seven, leading the Boston Americans to victory, while Phillippe, who also threw a respectable game, just couldn't pitch at Dinneen's level due to wearing out his arm in the series (as a result of playing so many games in such a short time span) and gave up three runs in the defeat. Honus Wagner struck out to end the Series.

Team	1	2	3	4	5	6	7	8	9	R	H	E
Pittsburgh	0	0	0	0	0	0	0	0	0	0	4	3
Boston	0	0	0	2	0	1	0	0	X	3	8	0
W: Bill Dinneen (3–1) L: Deacon Phillippe (3–2)
