= 1903 Philadelphia Phillies season =

Major League Baseball season

1903 Philadelphia Phillies
- League: National League
- Ballpark: National League Park
- City: Philadelphia
- Owners: James Potter
- Managers: Chief Zimmer

The 1903 Philadelphia Phillies season was a season in American baseball. The team finished seventh in the National League with a record of 49–86, 39 1/2 games behind the Pittsburgh Pirates.

== Offseason ==
James Potter and his syndicate of investors completed their acquisition of the Phillies, the "Philadelphia Base Ball Club", from Colonel John I. Rogers on April 3, 1903. Potter and his partners acquired the Phillies for $117,000.

== Preseason ==
The Phillies held spring training in 1903 in Richmond, Virginia where the team practiced and played exhibition games at Broad Street Park. It was the lone season the Phillies trained in Richmond.

=== 1903 Philadelphia City Series ===
The Philadelphia Athletics began play in 1901 with the founding of the American League. National League and American League teams did not play each other in 1901 or 1902 as the two leagues warred over markets and customers.

The two leagues made peace after 1902 and the Phillies and Athletics scheduled a preseason series for the local championship. The Phillies had last played for the city championship against the Player League’s Philadelphia Athletics in 1890. The Philadelphia Inquirer noted, "For the first time in thirteen years two local teams, representing rival base ball organizations, will come together in a friendly struggle for supremacy of the Quaker City." The Athletics had won the 1902 American League pennant, the Phillies had been newly acquired by John Rogers in February 1903, and interest was high.

The Phillies and Athletics played five of nine scheduled games; the Phillies defeated the Athletics, 4 games to 1.

The series was scheduled to begin on April 4, 1903 at the Phillies’ Philadelphia Ball Park but was called off due to rain. Games scheduled for April 7, 1903 at the Phillies’ park and April 8, 1903 at the Athletics’ Columbia Park were also canceled due to rain and wet grounds, along with the final scheduled game of the series on April 14, 1903 at the Phillies’ park.

AL Philadelphia Athletics (1) vs. NL Philadelphia Phillies (4)

Game	Date	Score	Location	Time	Attendance
1	April 6, 1903	Philadelphia Phillies – 2, Philadelphia Athletics – 0 (10)	Columbia Park	1:55	6,543
2	April 9, 1903	Philadelphia Athletics – 5, Philadelphia Phillies – 6 (10)	Philadelphia Ball Park	2:10	6,640
3	April 10, 1903	Philadelphia Phillies – 6, Philadelphia Athletics – 3	Columbia Park	1:40	8,771
4	April 11, 1903	Philadelphia Athletics – 7, Philadelphia Phillies – 1	Philadelphia Ball Park	1:38	13,050
5	April 13, 1903	Philadelphia Phillies – 2, Philadelphia Athletics – 1 (10)	Columbia Park	1:40	5,843

== Regular season ==
The Phillies played the franchise's first ever official league game on a Sunday on June 7, 1903 at Cincinnati after rain washed out the team's schedule three games with the Reds. The Phillies had heretofore never played an official game on a Sunday due to restrictions in Philadelphia against Sunday sporting events, and social traditions avoiding games on the Christian Sabbath. New Jersey did not have laws prohibiting Sunday sports and the Phillies had played their first ever Sunday game, an exhibition, on Sunday, April 26 against the West New York base ball club in Weehawken, New Jersey. In front of 8,000 fans at Cincinnati's League Park, the Phillies defeated the Reds 3 to 1 in 10-innings.

On August 8, 1903, a balcony collapsed at National League Park during a game against Boston. The New York Times reported the following day that four were killed and 125 injured. The Phillies temporarily called Columbia Park home while the Phillies' ballpark was repaired. They played sixteen games at Columbia Park in August and September 1903.

On September 18, 1903, Chick Fraser pitched a no-hitter in the second game of a double header against the Chicago Cubs at West Side Park. Fraser walked five batters, the Phillies committed four errors and won 10 to 0.

=== Season standings ===
National League
Team	W	L	Pct.	GB	Home	Road
Pittsburgh Pirates	91	49	.650	—	46‍–‍24	45‍–‍25
New York Giants	84	55	.604	6½	41‍–‍27	43‍–‍28
Chicago Cubs	82	56	.594	8	45‍–‍28	37‍–‍28
Cincinnati Reds	74	65	.532	16½	41‍–‍35	33‍–‍30
Brooklyn Superbas	70	66	.515	19	40‍–‍33	30‍–‍33
Boston Beaneaters	58	80	.420	32	31‍–‍35	27‍–‍45
Philadelphia Phillies	49	86	.363	39½	25‍–‍33	24‍–‍53
St. Louis Cardinals	43	94	.314	46½	22‍–‍45	21‍–‍49

=== Record vs. opponents ===
1903 National League record Sources:
Team	BSN	BRO	CHC	CIN	NYG	PHI	PIT	STL
Boston	—	9–11	7–13–1	7–13	8–12	10–8–1	5–15	12–8
Brooklyn	11–9	—	8–12	10–10	7–12–2	11–8–1	9–11	14–4–1
Chicago	13–7–1	12–8	—	9–11	8–12	12–6	12–8	16–4
Cincinnati	13–7	10–10	11–9	—	12–10	12–8–2	4–16	12–7
New York	12–8	12–7–2	12–8	8–12	—	15–5	10–10	15–5–1
Philadelphia	8–10–1	8–11–1	6–12	8–12–2	5–15	—	4–16–1	10–10
Pittsburgh	15–5	11–9	8–12	16–4	10–10	16–4–1	—	15–5
St. Louis	8–12	4–14–1	4–16	7–12	5–15–1	10–10	5–15	—

=== Notable transactions ===
- April 1903: Pop Williams was purchased by the Phillies from the Chicago Orphans.
- July 1903: Pop Williams was released by the Phillies.

=== Roster ===
1903 Philadelphia Phillies
Roster
Pitchers: Fred Burchell; Bill Duggleby; Chick Fraser; Jack McFetridge; Warren McLaughlin; Fred Mitchell; Tully Sparks; Libe Washburn; Pop Williams	Catchers: Red Dooin; Frank Roth; Chief Zimmer; Infielders: Roy Brashear; Klondike Douglass; Kid Gleason; Bill Hallman; Rudy Hulswitt; John Walsh; Harry Wolverton	Outfielders: Shad Barry; Bill Keister; Dutch Rudolph; Roy Thomas; John Titus	Manager: Chief Zimmer

== Postseason ==
=== 1903 Philadelphia City Series (Fall) ===
The Phillies and Athletics played a postseason series for the local championship in addition to the preseason series played in April. The teams played seven of ten games scheduled; games scheduled for October 8, 1903; October 9, 1903; and October 10, 1903 were canceled due to rain. The Athletics won the series, 4 games to 3.

All of the series games were played at the Athletics’ Columbia Park with each team alternating as the home team. The Phillies’ Philadelphia Ball Park’s had collapsed on August 8, 1903 leaving four dead, and closing the ballpark for the balance of the season.

AL Philadelphia Athletics (4) vs. NL Philadelphia Phillies (3)

Game	Date	Score	Location	Time	Attendance
1	September 30, 1903	Philadelphia Phillies – 3, Philadelphia Athletics – 7	Columbia Park	1:35	2,008
2	October 1, 1903	Philadelphia Athletics – 6, Philadelphia Phillies – 0	Columbia Park	1:45	2,439
3	October 2, 1903	Philadelphia Phillies – 5, Philadelphia Athletics – 1	Columbia Park	1:40	1,438
4	October 3, 1903	Philadelphia Athletics – 5, Philadelphia Phillies – 0	Columbia Park	1:35	3,896
5	October 5, 1903	Philadelphia Phillies – 1, Philadelphia Athletics – 6	Columbia Park	1:40	-
6	October 6, 1903	Philadelphia Athletics – 2, Philadelphia Phillies – 14 (8)	Columbia Park	1:50	1,084
7	October 7, 1903	Philadelphia Phillies – 13, Philadelphia Athletics – 3	Columbia Park	2:00	992

After the 1903 season, the Phillies had won 7 and the Athletics had won 5 of the 12 total games played in the city series.

== Player stats ==
=== Batting ===
==== Starters by position ====
Note: Pos = Position; G = Games played; AB = At bats; H = Hits; Avg. = Batting average; HR = Home runs; RBI = Runs batted in

Pos	Player	G	AB	H	Avg.	HR	RBI
C	Frank Roth	68	220	60	.273	0	22
1B	Klondike Douglass	105	377	96	.255	1	36
2B	Kid Gleason	106	412	117	.284	1	49
SS	Rudy Hulswitt	138	519	128	.247	1	58
3B	Harry Wolverton	123	494	152	.308	0	53
OF	Roy Thomas	130	477	156	.327	1	27
OF	Bill Keister	100	400	128	.320	3	63
OF	Shad Barry	138	550	152	.276	1	60

==== Other batters ====
Note: G = Games played; AB = At bats; H = Hits; Avg. = Batting average; HR = Home runs; RBI = Runs batted in

Player	G	AB	H	Avg.	HR	RBI
John Titus	72	280	80	.286	2	34
Bill Hallman	63	198	42	.212	0	17
Red Dooin	62	188	41	.218	0	14
Chief Zimmer	37	118	26	.220	1	19
Roy Brashear	20	75	17	.227	0	4
John Walsh	1	3	0	.000	0	0
Dutch Rudolph	1	1	0	.000	0	0

=== Pitching ===
==== Starting pitchers ====
Note: G = Games pitched; IP = Innings pitched; W = Wins; L = Losses; ERA = Earned run average; SO = Strikeouts

Player	G	IP	W	L	ERA	SO
Bill Duggleby	36	264.1	13	16	3.75	57
Chick Fraser	31	250.0	12	17	4.50	104
Tully Sparks	28	248.0	11	15	2.72	85
Fred Mitchell	28	227.0	11	16	4.48	69
Jack McFetridge	14	103.0	1	11	4.89	31
Libe Washburn	4	35.0	0	4	4.37	9
Pop Williams	2	18.0	1	1	3.00	8

==== Other pitchers ====
Note: G = Games pitched; IP = Innings pitched; W = Wins; L = Losses; ERA = Earned run average; SO = Strikeouts

Player	G	IP	W	L	ERA	SO
Fred Burchell	6	44.0	0	3	2.86	12
Warren McLaughlin	3	23.0	0	3	7.04	3
