= 1903 Cincinnati Reds season =

1903 Cincinnati Reds
- League: National League
- Ballpark: Palace of the Fans
- City: Cincinnati
- Owners: Garry Herrmann
- Managers: Joe Kelley

The 1903 Cincinnati Reds season was a season in American baseball. The team finished fourth in the National League with a record of 74–65, 16½ games behind the Pittsburgh Pirates.

== Regular season ==
After a successful 1902 season in which the Reds finished the season at .500 after finishing in last place in 1901, Cincinnati was looking to continue their improvement.

Joe Kelley, who took over as player-manager with sixty games remaining during the previous season, began his first full season with the team. During the off-season, forty-year-old outfielder Dummy Hoy retired. Hoy had played with the Reds from 1894 to 1897, before returning to the team for his final season in 1902. Twenty-five-year-old Mike Donlin took over for Hoy. Donlin had appeared in only 34 games with the Reds in 1902, but as a regular with the Baltimore Orioles of the American League in 1901, he hit .340 with five homers and 67 RBI.

In his first full season with the team, Donlin hit a team high .351 with seven home runs and 67 RBI, while scoring 110 runs. Cy Seymour, also in his first full season with the Reds, hit .342 with seven homers and 72 RBI. Jake Beckley had another solid year, with a .327 batting average, two home runs and 81 RBI. Harry Steinfeldt hit .312 with six home runs and a club high 83 RBI, while player-manager Kelley batted .316 with three homers and 45 RBI.

On the mound, Noodles Hahn led the way, going 22–12 with a 2.52 ERA in 34 starts, completing all of them. Jack Sutthoff was a surprise, going 16–9 with a 2.80 ERA in 30 games after spending the 1902 season in the minors with the Indianapolis Indians of the American Association.

=== Season summary ===
Cincinnati got off to a very slow start, losing eight of their first nine games to quickly fall into the National League cellar, 5.5 games out of first. The Reds rebounded by winning six of their next seven, then they hovered around the .500 in fourth place for pretty much the entire season after that. With their record at 44–43, the team managed to go 30–22 over their last fifty-two games to finish the season in fourth place at 74–65, which was their best record since going 83–67 in 1899, 16.5 games behind the pennant-winning Pittsburgh Pirates.

=== Season standings ===
National League
Team	W	L	Pct.	GB	Home	Road
Pittsburgh Pirates	91	49	.650	—	46‍–‍24	45‍–‍25
New York Giants	84	55	.604	6½	41‍–‍27	43‍–‍28
Chicago Cubs	82	56	.594	8	45‍–‍28	37‍–‍28
Cincinnati Reds	74	65	.532	16½	41‍–‍35	33‍–‍30
Brooklyn Superbas	70	66	.515	19	40‍–‍33	30‍–‍33
Boston Beaneaters	58	80	.420	32	31‍–‍35	27‍–‍45
Philadelphia Phillies	49	86	.363	39½	25‍–‍33	24‍–‍53
St. Louis Cardinals	43	94	.314	46½	22‍–‍45	21‍–‍49

=== Record vs. opponents ===
1903 National League record Sources:
Team	BSN	BRO	CHC	CIN	NYG	PHI	PIT	STL
Boston	—	9–11	7–13–1	7–13	8–12	10–8–1	5–15	12–8
Brooklyn	11–9	—	8–12	10–10	7–12–2	11–8–1	9–11	14–4–1
Chicago	13–7–1	12–8	—	9–11	8–12	12–6	12–8	16–4
Cincinnati	13–7	10–10	11–9	—	12–10	12–8–2	4–16	12–7
New York	12–8	12–7–2	12–8	8–12	—	15–5	10–10	15–5–1
Philadelphia	8–10–1	8–11–1	6–12	8–12–2	5–15	—	4–16–1	10–10
Pittsburgh	15–5	11–9	8–12	16–4	10–10	16–4–1	—	15–5
St. Louis	8–12	4–14–1	4–16	7–12	5–15–1	10–10	5–15	—

=== Roster ===
1903 Cincinnati Reds
Roster
Pitchers: Bob Ewing; Noodles Hahn; Jack Harper; Buck Hooker; Bill Phillips; Ed Poole; Rip Ragan; Jack Sutthoff; Jimmy Wiggs	Catchers: Bill Bergen; Pat Deisel; Lee Fohl; Emil Haberer; Heinie Peitz; Infielders: Jake Beckley; Tommy Corcoran; Tom Daly; Charlie DeArmond; George Magoon; Jack Morrissey; Harry Steinfeldt	Outfielders: Pete Cregan; Cozy Dolan; Mike Donlin; Joe Kelley; Dan Kerwin; Cy Seymour; Harry Wood	Manager: Joe Kelley

== Player stats ==
=== Batting ===
==== Starters by position ====
Note: Pos = Position; G = Games played; AB = At bats; H = Hits; Avg. = Batting average; HR = Home runs; RBI = Runs batted in

Pos	Player	G	AB	H	Avg.	HR	RBI
C	Heinie Peitz	105	358	93	.260	0	42
1B	Jake Beckley	120	459	150	.327	2	81
2B	Tom Daly	80	307	90	.293	1	38
SS	Tommy Corcoran	115	459	113	.246	2	73
3B	Harry Steinfeldt	118	439	137	.312	6	83
OF	Cy Seymour	135	558	191	.342	7	72
OF	Mike Donlin	126	496	174	.351	7	67
OF	Cozy Dolan	93	385	111	.288	0	58

==== Other batters ====
Note: G = Games played; AB = At bats; H = Hits; Avg. = Batting average; HR = Home runs; RBI = Runs batted in

Player	G	AB	H	Avg.	HR	RBI
Joe Kelley	105	383	121	.316	3	45
Bill Bergen	58	207	47	.227	0	19
George Magoon	42	139	30	.216	0	9
Jack Morrissey	29	89	22	.247	0	9
Charlie DeArmond	11	39	11	.282	0	7
Pete Cregan	6	19	2	.105	0	0
Lee Fohl	4	14	5	.357	0	2
Emil Haberer	5	13	1	.077	0	0
Dan Kerwin	2	6	4	.667	0	1
Harry Wood	2	3	0	.000	0	0
Pat Deisel	2	0	0	----	0	0

=== Pitching ===
==== Starting pitchers ====
Note: G = Games pitched; IP = Innings pitched; W = Wins; L = Losses; ERA = Earned run average; SO = Strikeouts

Player	G	IP	W	L	ERA	SO
Noodles Hahn	34	296.0	22	12	2.52	127
Bob Ewing	29	246.2	14	13	2.77	104
Jack Sutthoff	30	224.2	16	9	2.80	76
Ed Poole	25	184.0	7	13	3.28	73
Jack Harper	17	135.0	8	9	4.33	45
Bill Phillips	16	118.1	7	6	3.35	46

==== Other pitchers ====
Note: G = Games pitched; IP = Innings pitched; W = Wins; L = Losses; ERA = Earned run average; SO = Strikeouts

Player	G	IP	W	L	ERA	SO
Rip Ragan	3	18.0	0	2	6.00	7
Jimmy Wiggs	2	5.0	0	1	5.40	2

==== Relief pitchers ====
Note: G = Games pitched; W = Wins; L = Losses; SV = Saves; ERA = Earned run average; SO = Strikeouts

Player	G	W	L	SV	ERA	SO
Buck Hooker	1	0	0	0	0.00	0
