= 1903 Chicago Cubs season =

1903 Chicago Cubs
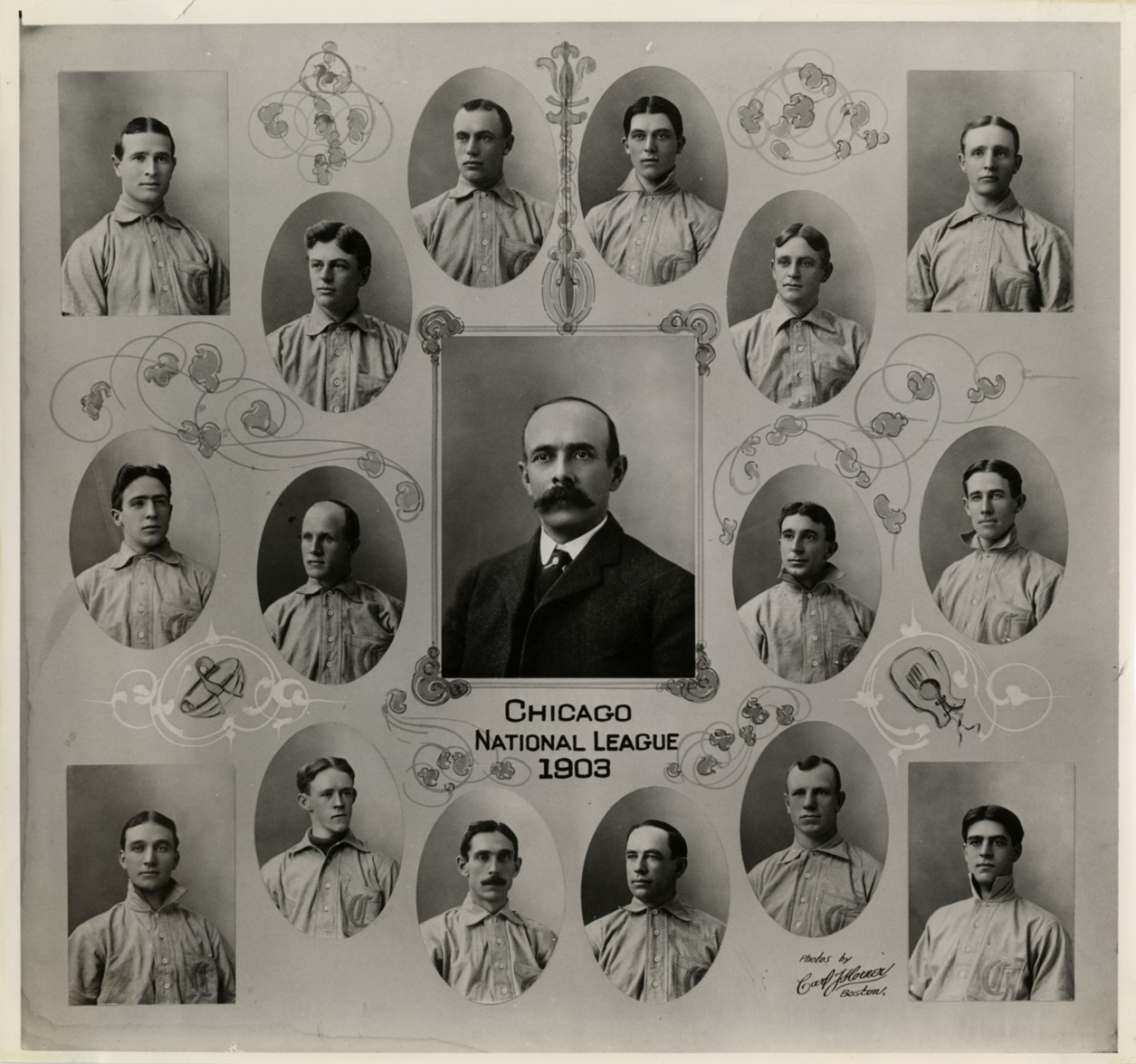
- Chicago National League 1903
- League: National League
- Ballpark: West Side Park
- City: Chicago
- Record: 82–56 (.594)
- League place: 3rd
- Owners: James Hart
- Managers: Frank Selee

The 1903 Chicago Cubs season was the 32nd season of the Chicago Cubs franchise, the 28th in the National League, and the 11th at West Side Park. The Cubs finished third in the National League with a record of 82–56.

== Regular season ==
On September 18, 1903, the Phillies' Chick Fraser pitched a no-hitter in the second game of a double header against the Cubs at West Side Park. Fraser walked five batters, the Phillies committed four errors and won 10 to 0.

=== Season standings ===
National League
Team	W	L	Pct.	GB	Home	Road
Pittsburgh Pirates	91	49	.650	—	46‍–‍24	45‍–‍25
New York Giants	84	55	.604	6½	41‍–‍27	43‍–‍28
Chicago Cubs	82	56	.594	8	45‍–‍28	37‍–‍28
Cincinnati Reds	74	65	.532	16½	41‍–‍35	33‍–‍30
Brooklyn Superbas	70	66	.515	19	40‍–‍33	30‍–‍33
Boston Beaneaters	58	80	.420	32	31‍–‍35	27‍–‍45
Philadelphia Phillies	49	86	.363	39½	25‍–‍33	24‍–‍53
St. Louis Cardinals	43	94	.314	46½	22‍–‍45	21‍–‍49

=== Record vs. opponents ===
1903 National League record Sources:
Team	BSN	BRO	CHC	CIN	NYG	PHI	PIT	STL
Boston	—	9–11	7–13–1	7–13	8–12	10–8–1	5–15	12–8
Brooklyn	11–9	—	8–12	10–10	7–12–2	11–8–1	9–11	14–4–1
Chicago	13–7–1	12–8	—	9–11	8–12	12–6	12–8	16–4
Cincinnati	13–7	10–10	11–9	—	12–10	12–8–2	4–16	12–7
New York	12–8	12–7–2	12–8	8–12	—	15–5	10–10	15–5–1
Philadelphia	8–10–1	8–11–1	6–12	8–12–2	5–15	—	4–16–1	10–10
Pittsburgh	15–5	11–9	8–12	16–4	10–10	16–4–1	—	15–5
St. Louis	8–12	4–14–1	4–16	7–12	5–15–1	10–10	5–15	—

=== Notable transactions ===
- April 1903: Pop Williams was purchased from the Orphans by the Philadelphia Phillies.

=== Roster ===
1903 Chicago Cubs
Roster
Pitchers: Clarence Currie; Jack Doscher; Peaches Graham; Alex Hardy; Carl Lundgren; Jock Menefee; Jack Taylor; Jake Weimer; Bob Wicker; Pop Williams	Catchers: Johnny Kling; Larry McLean; Tommy Raub; Infielders: Doc Casey; Frank Chance; Johnny Evers; Bill Hanlon; Bobby Lowe; George Moriarty; Joe Tinker; Otto Williams	Outfielders: Jim Cook; John Dobbs; Dick Harley; Davy Jones; Jack McCarthy; Jimmy Slagle	Manager: Frank Selee

== Player stats ==
=== Batting ===
==== Starters by position ====
Note: Pos = Position; G = Games played; AB = At bats; H = Hits; Avg. = Batting average; HR = Home runs; RBI = Runs batted in

Pos	Player	G	AB	H	Avg.	HR	RBI
C	Johnny Kling	132	491	146	.297	3	68
1B	Frank Chance	125	441	144	.327	2	81
2B	Johnny Evers	124	464	136	.293	0	52
SS	Joe Tinker	124	460	134	.291	2	70
3B	Doc Casey	112	435	126	.290	1	40
OF	Jimmy Slagle	139	543	162	.298	0	44
OF	Davy Jones	130	497	140	.282	1	62
OF	Dick Harley	104	386	89	.231	0	33

==== Other batters ====
Note: G = Games played; AB = At bats; H = Hits; Avg. = Batting average; HR = Home runs; RBI = Runs batted in

Player	G	AB	H	Avg.	HR	RBI
Otto Williams	38	130	29	.223	0	13
Bobby Lowe	32	105	28	.267	0	15
Jack McCarthy	24	101	28	.277	0	14
Tommy Raub	36	84	19	.226	0	7
John Dobbs	16	61	14	.230	0	4
Jim Cook	8	26	4	.154	0	2
Bill Hanlon	8	21	2	.095	0	2
George Moriarty	1	5	0	.000	0	0
Larry McLean	1	4	0	.000	0	1

=== Pitching ===
==== Starting pitchers ====
Note: G = Games pitched; IP = Innings pitched; W = Wins; L = Losses; ERA = Earned run average; SO = Strikeouts

Player	G	IP	W	L	ERA	SO
Jack Taylor	37	312.1	21	14	2.45	83
Jake Weimer	35	282.0	20	8	2.30	128
Bob Wicker	32	247.0	20	9	3.02	110
Carl Lundgren	27	193.0	11	9	2.94	67
Jock Menefee	20	147.0	8	10	3.00	39
Alex Hardy	3	12.2	1	1	6.39	4
Peaches Graham	1	5.0	0	1	5.40	4
Pop Williams	1	5.0	0	1	5.40	2
Jack Doscher	1	3.0	0	1	12.00	5

==== Other pitchers ====
Note: G = Games pitched; IP = Innings pitched; W = Wins; L = Losses; ERA = Earned run average; SO = Strikeouts

Player	G	IP	W	L	ERA	SO
Clarence Currie	6	33.1	1	2	2.97	9
