= 1903 Boston Beaneaters season =

1903 Boston Beaneaters
- League: National League
- Ballpark: South End Grounds
- City: Boston, Massachusetts
- Record: 58–80 (.420)
- League place: 6th
- Owners: Arthur Soden
- Managers: Al Buckenberger

The 1903 Boston Beaneaters season was the 33rd season of the franchise. The team finished sixth in the National League with a record of 58–80, 32 games behind the Pittsburgh Pirates.

== Regular season ==
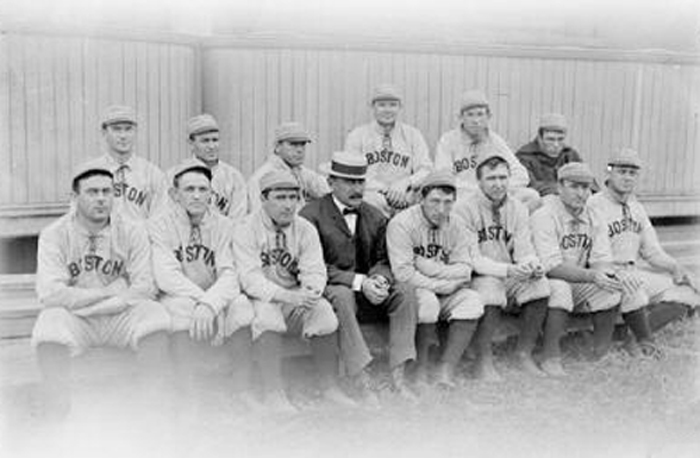
The 1903 Boston Beaneaters

=== Season standings ===
National League
Team	W	L	Pct.	GB	Home	Road
Pittsburgh Pirates	91	49	.650	—	46‍–‍24	45‍–‍25
New York Giants	84	55	.604	6½	41‍–‍27	43‍–‍28
Chicago Cubs	82	56	.594	8	45‍–‍28	37‍–‍28
Cincinnati Reds	74	65	.532	16½	41‍–‍35	33‍–‍30
Brooklyn Superbas	70	66	.515	19	40‍–‍33	30‍–‍33
Boston Beaneaters	58	80	.420	32	31‍–‍35	27‍–‍45
Philadelphia Phillies	49	86	.363	39½	25‍–‍33	24‍–‍53
St. Louis Cardinals	43	94	.314	46½	22‍–‍45	21‍–‍49

=== Record vs. opponents ===
1903 National League record Sources:
Team	BSN	BRO	CHC	CIN	NYG	PHI	PIT	STL
Boston	—	9–11	7–13–1	7–13	8–12	10–8–1	5–15	12–8
Brooklyn	11–9	—	8–12	10–10	7–12–2	11–8–1	9–11	14–4–1
Chicago	13–7–1	12–8	—	9–11	8–12	12–6	12–8	16–4
Cincinnati	13–7	10–10	11–9	—	12–10	12–8–2	4–16	12–7
New York	12–8	12–7–2	12–8	8–12	—	15–5	10–10	15–5–1
Philadelphia	8–10–1	8–11–1	6–12	8–12–2	5–15	—	4–16–1	10–10
Pittsburgh	15–5	11–9	8–12	16–4	10–10	16–4–1	—	15–5
St. Louis	8–12	4–14–1	4–16	7–12	5–15–1	10–10	5–15	—

=== Notable transactions ===
- July 23, 1903: Pop Williams was signed as a free agent by the Beaneaters.

=== Roster ===
1903 Boston Beaneaters
Roster
Pitchers: John Malarkey; Wiley Piatt; Togie Pittinger; Pop Williams; Vic Willis	Catchers: Malachi Kittridge; Pat Moran; Infielders: Ed Abbaticchio; Chub Aubrey; Frank Bonner; Ed Gremminger; Fred Tenney	Outfielders: Pat Carney; Duff Cooley; Charlie Dexter; Tom McCreery; Joe Stanley	Manager: Al Buckenberger

== Player stats ==
=== Batting ===
==== Starters by position ====
Note: Pos = Position; G = Games played; AB = At bats; H = Hits; Avg. = Batting average; HR = Home runs; RBI = Runs batted in

Pos	Player	G	AB	H	Avg.	HR	RBI
C	Pat Moran	109	389	102	.262	7	54
1B	Fred Tenney	122	447	140	.313	3	41
2B	Ed Abbaticchio	136	489	111	.227	1	46
3B	Ed Gremminger	140	511	135	.264	5	56
SS	Harry Aubrey	96	325	69	.212	0	27
OF	Charlie Dexter	123	457	102	.223	3	34
OF	Duff Cooley	138	553	160	.289	1	70
OF	Pat Carney	110	392	94	.240	1	49

==== Other batters ====
Note: G = Games played; AB = At bats; H = Hits; Avg. = Batting average; HR = Home runs; RBI = Runs batted in

Player	G	AB	H	Avg.	HR	RBI
Joe Stanley	86	308	77	.250	1	47
Frank Bonner	48	173	38	.220	1	10
Malachi Kittridge	32	99	21	.212	0	6
Tom McCreery	23	83	18	.217	1	10

=== Pitching ===
==== Starting pitchers ====
Note: G = Games pitched; IP = Innings pitched; W = Wins; L = Losses; ERA = Earned run average; SO = Strikeouts

Player	G	IP	W	L	ERA	SO
Togie Pittinger	44	351.2	18	22	3.48	140
Vic Willis	33	278.0	12	18	2.98	125
John Malarkey	32	253.0	11	16	3.09	98
Wiley Piatt	25	181.0	9	14	3.18	100
Pop Williams	10	83.0	4	5	4.12	20
Pat Carney	10	78.0	4	5	4.04	29

==== Relief pitchers ====
Note: G = Games pitched; W = Wins; L = Losses; SV = Saves; ERA = Earned run average; SO = Strikeouts

Player	G	W	L	SV	ERA	SO
Joe Stanley	1	0	0	0	9.00	4
