= John Walsh (baseball) =

American baseball player (1879-1947)

- Third baseman
- Born: March 25, 1879; Wilkes-Barre, Pennsylvania, U.S.
- Died: April 25, 1947 (aged 68); Jamaica, New York, U.S.
- Batted: Right Threw: Right

Career statistics
- Stats at Baseball Reference

Teams
- Philadelphia Phillies (1903)

John Gabriel Walsh (March 25, 1879 – April 25, 1947) was an American third baseman in Major League Baseball who played for the Philadelphia Phillies in the 1903 season. Listed at 5 ft 8 in (1.73 m), 162 pounds (73 kg), he batted and threw right handed.

Born in Wilkes-Barre, Pennsylvania, Walsh attended Fordham University between 1898 and 1903 and University of Notre Dame in 1901. He went on to play Class C baseball in the minor leagues in 1902, starting with the Meriden Silverites of the Connecticut State League before joining the Wilkes-Barre/Mount Carmel of the Pennsylvania State League during the midseason.

Afterwards, he was acquired by the Phillies and made his major league debut on June 22, 1903.

Welsh made only one game appearance for Philadelphia and went hitless in three at-bats, but never returned to the majors.

Little was heard of Walsh until 1906, when he joined the Class B Waterbury Authors of the Connecticut State League.

He died in 1947 in Jamaica, New York at the age of 68.

== See also ==
- Cup of coffee
