= Ed Hug =

American baseball player (1880-1953)

- Catcher
- Born: July 14, 1880; Fayetteville, Ohio, United States
- Died: May 11, 1953 (aged 72); Cincinnati, Ohio, U.S.
- Batted: Right Threw: Right

MLB debut
- July 6, 1903, for the Brooklyn Superbas

Last MLB appearance
- July 6, 1903, for the Brooklyn Superbas

MLB statistics
- Batting average: .000
- Home runs: 0
- Runs batted in: 0
- Stats at Baseball Reference

Teams
- Brooklyn Superbas (1903)

Edward Ambrose Hug (July 14, 1880 – May 11, 1953) was an American Major League Baseball catcher. He played in one game for the Brooklyn Superbas in 1903. Hug's sole Major League appearance came in the second game of a doubleheader in Cincinnati on July 6. He was a local amateur catcher at the time and was called upon to relieve a fatigued Lew Ritter in the fifth inning. He walked in his only plate appearance. The game was called in the seventh inning, to allow the Brooklyn team to catch their train out of town.

Hug shares the major league records for the shortest name and the shortest career.

He is buried at New St. Joseph Cemetery in Cincinnati.
