= George Merritt (baseball) =

American baseball player (1880–1938)

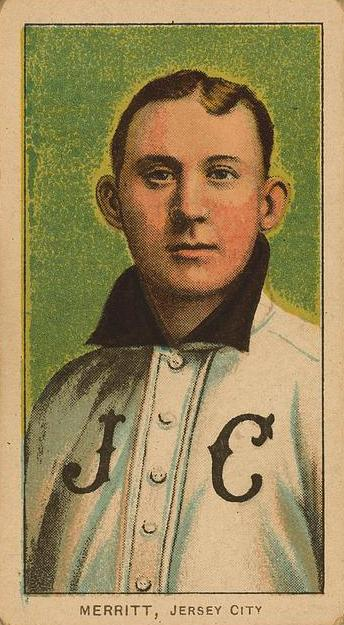
- Outfielder
- Born: April 14, 1880; Paterson, New Jersey
- Died: February 21, 1938 (aged 57); Memphis, Tennessee
- Batted: Unknown Threw: Right

MLB debut
- September 6, 1901, for the Pittsburgh Pirates

Last MLB appearance
- May 26, 1903, for the Pittsburgh Pirates

MLB statistics
- Batting average: .213
- Home runs: 0
- Runs batted in: 5
- Stats at Baseball Reference

Teams
- Pittsburgh Pirates (1901–1903)

George Washington Merritt (April 14, 1880 – February 21, 1938) was an outfielder in Major League Baseball.

Merritt played with several professional teams, including the National League's Pittsburgh Pirates. He spent 1903–1910 with the Jersey City Skeeters. He retired in 1915.
