= Jim Cook (baseball) =

American baseball player (1879–1949)

- Outfielder
- Born: November 10, 1879; Dundee, Illinois, U.S.
- Died: June 16, 1949 (aged 69); St. Louis, Missouri, U.S.
- Batted: Right Threw: Right

MLB debut
- July 2, 1903, for the Chicago Cubs

Last MLB appearance
- July 13, 1903, for the Chicago Cubs

MLB statistics
- Batting average: .154
- Home runs: 0
- Runs batted in: 2
- Stats at Baseball Reference

Teams
- Chicago Cubs (1903)

James Fitchie Cook (November 10, 1879 – June 17, 1949) was an American Major League Baseball player. Cook played in the 1903 season with the Chicago Cubs. In 8 games, Cook had four hits in 26 at-bats. He played the outfield and batted and threw right-handed.

Cook was born in Dundee, Illinois and died in St. Louis, Missouri.
