= Pete Cregan =

American baseball player (1875–1945)

- Outfielder
- Born: April 13, 1875; Kingston, New York, U.S.
- Died: May 18, 1945 (aged 70); New York City, New York, U.S.
- Batted: Right Threw: Right

MLB debut
- September 8, 1899, for the New York Giants

Last MLB appearance
- June 11, 1903, for the Cincinnati Reds

MLB statistics
- Batting average: .095
- Home runs: 0
- Runs batted in: 0
- Stats at Baseball Reference

Teams
- New York Giants (1899); Cincinnati Reds (1903)

Peter James Cregan (April 13, 1875 – May 18, 1945) was an American outfielder in Major League Baseball.
