= Reddy Grey =

American baseball player (1875–1934)

- Outfielder
- Born: April 8, 1875; Zanesville, Ohio, U.S.
- Died: November 9, 1934 (aged 59); Altadena, California, U.S.
- Batted: Left Threw: Left

MLB debut
- May 28, 1903, for the Pittsburgh Pirates

Last MLB appearance
- May 28, 1903, for the Pittsburgh Pirates

MLB statistics
- Batting average: .333
- Home runs: 0
- Runs batted in: 2
- Stats at Baseball Reference

Teams
- Pittsburgh Pirates (1903)

Romer Carl "Reddy" Grey (April 8, 1875 – November 9, 1934) was an American professional baseball player. He played one game in Major League Baseball in 1903 for the Pittsburgh Pirates.

== Baseball career ==
Grey began his baseball career in 1895 with the Jackson Jaxons of the Michigan State League. Overall, he played nine seasons professionally. In his final season, 1903, he was playing for the Worcester Riddlers of the Eastern League when the Pirates acquired him on loan on May 28. He played left field for the Pirates in that day's game, a 7-6 win over the Boston Braves. Grey got one hit (a single) and one walk in four plate appearances (for a career on-base percentage of .500), on the way to driving in two runs and scoring another. Grey then returned to Worcester, where he finished out the 1903 season.

Reddy's brother was famed author Zane Grey, who also played minor league baseball. The two were teammates on both the Jaxons and Findlay Sluggers of the Interstate League in 1895.

== Fishing and writing career ==
R C Grey was also a well known fisherman, like his more famous brother, and held several record catches as described in his book, including a world record Broadbill of 588 lbs. He was the author of a book called "Adventures of a Deep-Sea Angler", published in 1930. There are later re-prints. Zane Grey himself in his own fishing books often refers to his brother, usually as "R.C." Reddy often accompanied his brother on the latter's world-wide fishing expeditions.

== Sources ==
- Career statistics from Baseball Reference · Baseball Reference (Minors) · Retrosheet · Baseball Almanac
