= Tommy Raub =

American baseball player (1870–1949)

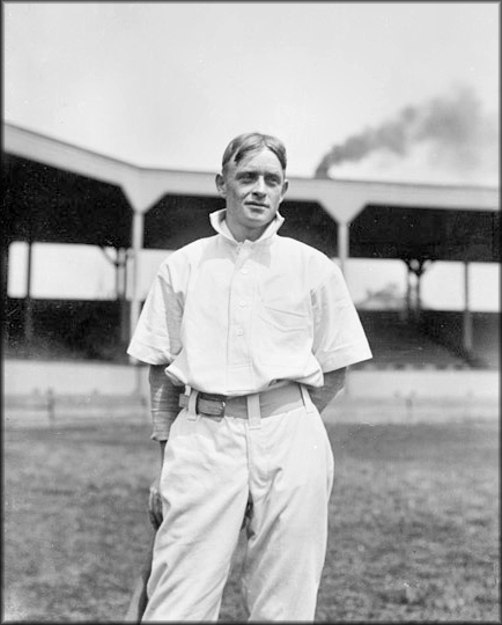
- Catcher
- Born: December 1, 1870; Raubsville, Pennsylvania, U.S.
- Died: February 15, 1949 (aged 78); Phillipsburg, New Jersey, U.S.
- Batted: Right Threw: Right

MLB debut
- May 3, 1903, for the Chicago Cubs

Last MLB appearance
- June 22, 1906, for the St. Louis Cardinals

MLB statistics
- Batting average: .253
- Home runs: 0
- Runs batted in: 9
- Stats at Baseball Reference

Teams
- Chicago Cubs (1903); St. Louis Cardinals (1906)

Thomas Jefferson Raub (December 1, 1870 – February 15, 1949) was an American professional baseball player. He was a catcher for parts of two seasons (1903, 1906) with the Chicago Cubs and St. Louis Cardinals. For his career, he compiled a .253 batting average in 162 at-bats, with nine runs batted in.

He was born in Raubsville, Pennsylvania and died in Phillipsburg, New Jersey at the age of 78.
