= Harry Wood (baseball) =

American baseball player (1885–1955)

- Outfielder
- Born: February 10, 1885; Waterville, Maine, U.S.
- Died: May 18, 1955 (aged 70); Bethesda, Maryland, U.S.
- Batted: Left Threw: Right

MLB debut
- April 19, 1903, for the Cincinnati Reds

Last MLB appearance
- April 27, 1903, for the Cincinnati Reds

MLB statistics
- Batting average: .000
- At bats: 3
- Walks: 1
- Stats at Baseball Reference

Teams
- Cincinnati Reds (1903)

Harold Austin Wood (February 10, 1885 – May 18, 1955) was an American professional baseball player. He played two games in Major League Baseball in 1903 with the Cincinnati Reds, one as a left fielder and one as a right fielder.

For his career, he collected no hits in three at bats with one walk. At 18, he was the second-youngest player in the National League during the 1903 season.

An alumnus of the University of Maryland, he was born in Waterville, Maine and later died in Bethesda, Maryland at the age of 70.
