= 1903 Brooklyn Superbas season =

1903 Brooklyn Superbas
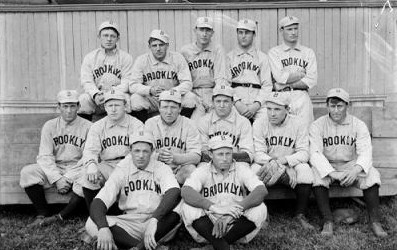
- League: National League
- Ballpark: Washington Park
- City: Brooklyn, New York
- Record: 70–66 (.515)
- League place: 5th
- Owners: Charles Ebbets, Ferdinand Abell, Harry Von der Horst, Ned Hanlon
- President: Charles Ebbets
- Managers: Ned Hanlon

The 1903 Brooklyn Superbas season was a season in Major League Baseball. The Superbas began their slide from contention in the National League by finishing in fifth place.

== Offseason ==
- January 30, 1903: Jack Doyle was purchased by the Superbas from the Washington Senators.
- February 17, 1903: Henry Thielman was purchased by the Superbas from the Cincinnati Reds.
- February 17, 1903: Rube Vickers was purchased by the Superbas from the Cincinnati Reds.

== Regular season ==
=== Season standings ===
National League
Team	W	L	Pct.	GB	Home	Road
Pittsburgh Pirates	91	49	.650	—	46‍–‍24	45‍–‍25
New York Giants	84	55	.604	6½	41‍–‍27	43‍–‍28
Chicago Cubs	82	56	.594	8	45‍–‍28	37‍–‍28
Cincinnati Reds	74	65	.532	16½	41‍–‍35	33‍–‍30
Brooklyn Superbas	70	66	.515	19	40‍–‍33	30‍–‍33
Boston Beaneaters	58	80	.420	32	31‍–‍35	27‍–‍45
Philadelphia Phillies	49	86	.363	39½	25‍–‍33	24‍–‍53
St. Louis Cardinals	43	94	.314	46½	22‍–‍45	21‍–‍49

=== Record vs. opponents ===
1903 National League record Sources:
Team	BSN	BRO	CHC	CIN	NYG	PHI	PIT	STL
Boston	—	9–11	7–13–1	7–13	8–12	10–8–1	5–15	12–8
Brooklyn	11–9	—	8–12	10–10	7–12–2	11–8–1	9–11	14–4–1
Chicago	13–7–1	12–8	—	9–11	8–12	12–6	12–8	16–4
Cincinnati	13–7	10–10	11–9	—	12–10	12–8–2	4–16	12–7
New York	12–8	12–7–2	12–8	8–12	—	15–5	10–10	15–5–1
Philadelphia	8–10–1	8–11–1	6–12	8–12–2	5–15	—	4–16–1	10–10
Pittsburgh	15–5	11–9	8–12	16–4	10–10	16–4–1	—	15–5
St. Louis	8–12	4–14–1	4–16	7–12	5–15–1	10–10	5–15	—

=== Notable transactions ===
- September 5, 1903: Tom McCreery was purchased from the Superbas by the Boston Beaneaters.

=== Roster ===
1903 Brooklyn Superbas
Roster
Pitchers: Jack Doscher; Roy Evans; Ned Garvin; Oscar Jones; Bill Pounds; Bill Reidy; Henry Schmidt; Grant Thatcher; Rube Vickers	Catchers: Hughie Hearne; Ed Hug; Fred Jacklitsch; Frank McManus; Lew Ritter; Infielders: Matt Broderick; Bill Dahlen; Tim Flood; Jack Doyle; Dutch Jordan; Sammy Strang	Outfielders: John Dobbs; Doc Gessler; Ed Householder; Hughie Jennings; Walter McCredie; Tom McCreery; Jimmy Sheckard; Henry Thielman	Manager: Ned Hanlon

== Player stats ==
=== Batting ===
==== Starters by position ====
Note: Pos = Position; G = Games played; AB = At bats; R = Runs; H = Hits; Avg. = Batting average; HR = Home runs; RBI = Runs batted in; SB = Stolen bases

Pos	Player	G	AB	R	H	Avg.	HR	RBI	SB
C	Lew Ritter	78	259	26	61	.236	0	37	9
1B	Jack Doyle	139	524	84	164	.313	0	91	34
2B	Tim Flood	89	309	27	77	.249	0	32	14
3B	Sammy Strang	135	508	101	138	.272	0	38	46
SS	Bill Dahlen	138	474	71	124	.262	1	64	34
OF	Jimmy Sheckard	139	515	99	171	.332	9	75	67
OF	John Dobbs	111	414	61	98	.237	2	59	23
OF	Walter McCredie	56	213	40	69	.324	0	20	10

==== Other batters ====
Note: G = Games played; AB = At bats; R = Runs; H = Hits; Avg. = Batting average; HR = Home runs; RBI = Runs batted in; SB = Stolen bases

Player	G	AB	R	H	Avg.	HR	RBI	SB
Dutch Jordan	78	267	27	63	.236	0	21	9
Fred Jacklitsch	60	176	31	47	.267	1	21	4
Doc Gessler	49	154	20	38	.247	0	18	9
Tom McCreery	40	141	13	37	.262	0	20	5
Hughie Hearne	26	57	8	16	.281	0	4	2
Ed Householder	12	43	5	9	.209	0	9	3
Henry Thielman	9	23	3	5	.217	1	2	0
Hughie Jennings	6	17	2	4	.235	0	1	1
Frank McManus	2	7	0	0	.000	0	0	0
Matt Broderick	2	2	0	0	.000	0	0	0
Ed Hug	1	0	0	0	----	0	0	0

=== Pitching ===
==== Starting pitchers ====
Note: G = Games pitched; Games started; IP = Innings pitched; W = Wins; L = Losses; ERA = Earned run average; BB = Bases on balls; SO = Strikeouts; CG = Complete games

Player	G	GS	IP	W	L	ERA	BB	SO	CG
Oscar Jones	38	36	324.1	19	14	2.94	77	95	31
Henry Schmidt	40	36	301.0	22	13	3.83	120	96	29
Ned Garvin	38	34	298.0	15	18	3.08	84	154	30
Roy Evans	15	12	110.0	5	9	3.27	41	42	9
Bill Reidy	15	13	104.0	6	7	3.46	14	21	11
Grant Thatcher	4	4	28.0	3	1	2.89	7	9	4

==== Other pitchers ====
Note: G = Games pitched; GS = Games started; IP = Innings pitched; W = Wins; L = Losses; ERA = Earned run average; BB = Bases on balls; SO = Strikeouts; CG = Complete games

Player	G	GS	IP	W	L	ERA	BB	SO	CG
Henry Thielman	4	3	29.0	0	3	4.66	14	10	3
Rube Vickers	4	1	14.0	0	1	10.93	9	5	1

==== Relief pitchers ====
Note: G = Games pitched; IP = Innings pitched; W = Wins; L = Losses; SV = Saves; ERA = Earned run average; BB = Bases on balls; SO = Strikeouts

Player	G	IP	W	L	SV	ERA	BB	SO
Jack Doscher	3	7.0	0	0	0	7.71	9	4
Bill Pounds	1	6.0	0	0	0	6.00	2	2
