= Ed Taylor (pitcher) =

American baseball player (1877–1912)

- Pitcher
- Born: March 23, 1877; Palestine, Texas, U.S.
- Died: January 31, 1912 (aged 34); Dallas, Texas, U.S.
- Batted: Unknown Threw: Left

MLB debut
- August 8, 1903, for the St. Louis Cardinals

Last MLB appearance
- August 8, 1903, for the St. Louis Cardinals

MLB statistics
- Win–loss record: 0-0
- Strikeouts: 1
- Earned run average: 0.00
- Stats at Baseball Reference

Teams
- St. Louis Cardinals (1903)

Edgar Ruben Taylor (March 23, 1877 - January 31, 1912), nicknamed "Rube", was an American Major League Baseball (MLB) pitcher. He pitched in one game for the St. Louis Cardinals in 1903. In his lone major league game, he pitched three innings without giving up a hit or a run, walking nobody and striking out one batter.
