= Chub Aubrey =

American baseball player (1881–1953)

- Shortstop
- Born: July 5, 1881; St. Joseph, Missouri, U.S.
- Died: September 18, 1953 (aged 72); Baltimore, Maryland, U.S.
- Batted: Right Threw: Right

MLB debut
- April 22, 1903, for the Boston Beaneaters

Last MLB appearance
- September 27, 1903, for the Boston Beaneaters

MLB statistics
- Batting average: .212
- Home runs: 0
- Runs batted in: 27
- Stats at Baseball Reference

Teams
- Boston Beaneaters (1903)

Harry Herbert Aubrey (July 5, 1881 – September 18, 1953) was an American Major League Baseball infielder. He played for the Boston Beaneaters during the 1903 season.
