= Bill Bartley =

American baseball player (1885-1965)

- Pitcher
- Born: January 8, 1885; Cincinnati, Ohio, U.S.
- Died: May 17, 1965 (aged 80); Cincinnati, Ohio, U.S.
- Batted: Right Threw: Right

MLB debut
- September 15, 1903, for the New York Giants

Last MLB appearance
- September 20, 1907, for the Philadelphia Athletics

MLB statistics
- Win–loss record: 0-1
- Earned run average: 3.04
- Strikeouts: 24
- Stats at Baseball Reference

Teams
- New York Giants (1903); Philadelphia Athletics (1906–1907)

William Jackson Bartley (January 8, 1885 – May 17, 1965) was an American professional baseball pitcher. He played in Major League Baseball for the New York Giants and Philadelphia Athletics.
