= Jack Dunleavy =

American baseball player (1879–1944)

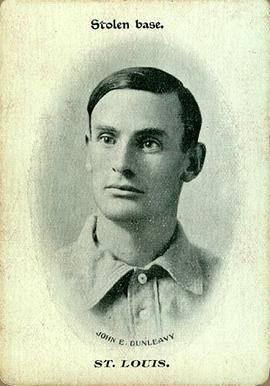
- Outfielder / Pitcher
- Born: September 14, 1879; Harrison, New Jersey, U.S.
- Died: April 11, 1944 (aged 64); South Norwalk, Connecticut, U.S.
- Batted: Left Threw: Left

MLB debut
- May 30, 1903, for the St. Louis Cardinals

Last MLB appearance
- October 8, 1905, for the St. Louis Cardinals

MLB statistics
- Batting average: .241
- Runs batted in: 49
- Win–loss record: 7–12
- Earned run average: 4.18
- Stats at Baseball Reference

Teams
- St. Louis Cardinals (1903–1905)

John Francis Dunleavy (September 14, 1879 – April 11, 1944) was an American outfielder and pitcher in Major League Baseball. He played for the St. Louis Cardinals from 1903 to 1905. He played college baseball at Amherst College.
