= Harry Betts (baseball) =

American baseball player (1881–1946)

- Pitcher
- Born: June 19, 1881; Alliance, Ohio, U.S.
- Died: May 22, 1946 (aged 64); San Antonio, Texas, U.S.
- Batted: Right Threw: Right

MLB debut
- September 22, 1903, for the St. Louis Cardinals

Last MLB appearance
- May 13, 1913, for the Cincinnati Reds

MLB statistics
- Win–loss record: 0–1
- Earned run average: 8.03
- Strikeouts: 2
- Stats at Baseball Reference

Teams
- St. Louis Cardinals (1903); Cincinnati Reds (1913)

Harold Matthew Betts (June 19, 1881 – May 22, 1946) was an American professional baseball pitcher in the Major Leagues in 1903 for the St. Louis Cardinals and in 1913 for the Cincinnati Reds.

In 1905, a pitcher named Brown signed with the Los Angeles Angels of the Pacific Coast League. He was later confirmed to be Harold Betts and to have assumed a pseudonym because of his family's objections to his playing professional baseball.

Betts played for the 1913 Reds under the name Fred Betts. It was not until 1985 that the Society for American Baseball Research published researching showing that the two players were the same.
