= Jack McFetridge =

American baseball player (1869–1917)

- Pitcher
- Born: August 25, 1869; Philadelphia, Pennsylvania, U.S.
- Died: January 10, 1917 (aged 47); Glenolden, Pennsylvania, U.S.
- Batted: Unknown Threw: Unknown

MLB debut
- June 7, 1890, for the Philadelphia Phillies

Last MLB appearance
- September 27, 1903, for the Philadelphia Phillies

MLB statistics
- Win–loss record: 2–11
- Earned run average: 4.58
- Strikeouts: 35
- Stats at Baseball Reference

Teams
- Philadelphia Phillies (1890, 1903)

John Reed McFetridge (August 25, 1869 – January 10, 1917) was a Major League Baseball pitcher who played one game in 1890 and 12 games in 1903 with the Philadelphia Phillies of the National League. He played with three minor league baseball teams in the Philadelphia area including the Wilmington Peaches of the Tri-State League.

== Early life ==
John Reed McFetridge was born on August 25, 1869. His father had wealth from a successful printing business and refused to allow his son to play professional baseball. McFetridge rejected an offer to play for the Cleveland, Ohio American Association team in 1888. He pitched for the amateur Wynnewood team in Philadelphia and for the amateur Highland team in Gloucester, New Jersey. He played college ball at the University of Pennsylvania.

== Career ==
In 1890, McFetridge pitched for the Philadelphia Phillies after the manager Harry Wright was finally able to convince McFetridge's father to allow him to pitch one game as a tryout. He pitched a complete-game shutout and won the game, but his father continued to refuse to allow him to play professional baseball. He returned to amateur baseball and pitched for the New Jersey Rivertons.

His father finally relented in 1903 and allowed McFetridge to join the Philadelphia Phillies. McFetridge played only one season with the Phillies and finished with a 1-11 record.

In 1907, he played for the Wilmington Peaches in the Tri-State League and did well enough to earn a spot on the 1908 roster. However, he broke his kneecap playing in a neighborhood football game which ended his professional baseball career. He died from a heart attack in Glenolden, Pennsylvania on January 10, 1917 and was interred at Laurel Hill Cemetery in Philadelphia.
