= Lave Winham =

American baseball player (1881–1951)

- Pitcher
- Born: October 23, 1881; Brooklyn, New York, U.S.
- Died: September 12, 1951 (aged 69); Brooklyn, New York, U.S.
- Batted: Left Threw: Left

MLB debut
- April 21, 1902, for the Brooklyn Superbas

Last MLB appearance
- September 21, 1903, for the Pittsburgh Pirates

MLB statistics
- Win–loss record: 3–1
- Earned run average: 2.08
- Strikeouts: 23
- Stats at Baseball Reference

Teams
- Brooklyn Superbas (1902); Pittsburgh Pirates (1903)

Lafayette Sharkey Winham (October 23, 1881 – September 12, 1951), nicknamed "Lefty", was an American professional baseball pitcher. He pitched in six games in Major League Baseball for the 1902 Brooklyn Superbas and 1903 Pittsburgh Pirates.

Winham appeared in five games for the Pirates team that went on to lose the first World Series, in which he did not appear. That season, he pitched a six inning shutout against the Philadelphia Phillies at Columbia Park in Philadelphia.

At the minor league level, Lafayette pitched for the Montreal Royals in 1903.
