= Roy Brashear =

American baseball player (1874–1951)

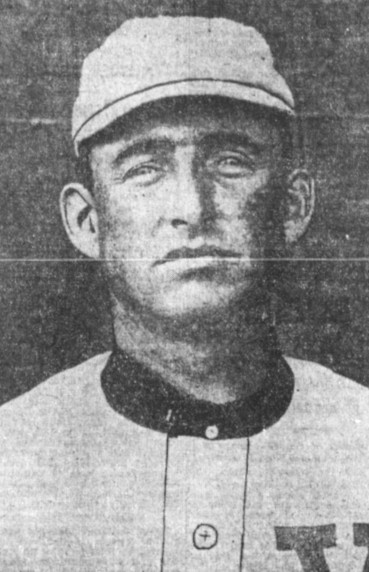
- Infielder
- Born: January 3, 1874; Ashtabula, Ohio, U.S.
- Died: April 20, 1951 (aged 77); Los Angeles, California, U.S.
- Batted: Right Threw: Right

MLB debut
- April 25, 1902, for the St. Louis Cardinals

Last MLB appearance
- May 23, 1903, for the Philadelphia Phillies

MLB statistics
- Batting average: .268
- Home runs: 1
- Runs batted in: 44
- Stats at Baseball Reference

Teams
- St. Louis Cardinals (1902); Philadelphia Phillies (1903)

Roy Parks Brashear (January 3, 1874 – April 20, 1951) was an American professional baseball infielder. He played in Major League Baseball (MLB) from 1902–1903 for the St. Louis Cardinals and Philadelphia Phillies. His brother, Kitty Brashear, also played in the Majors.
