= Libe Washburn =

American baseball player (1874–1940)

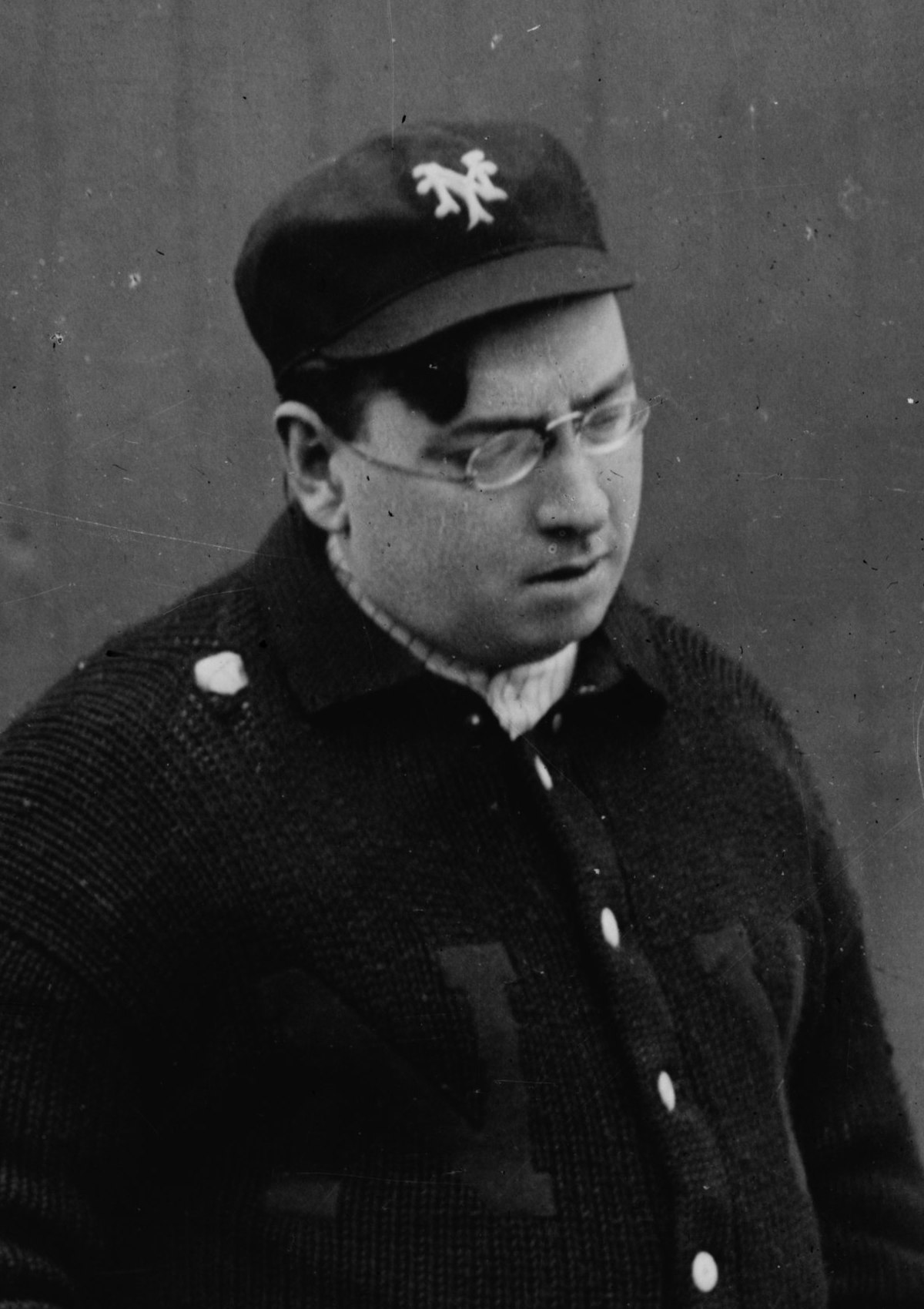
- Outfielder / Pitcher
- Born: June 16, 1874; Lyme, New Hampshire
- Died: March 22, 1940 (aged 65); Malone, New York
- Batted: Both Threw: Left

MLB debut
- May 30, 1902, for the New York Giants

Last MLB appearance
- July 22, 1903, for the Philadelphia Phillies

MLB statistics
- Batting average: .444
- Hits: 7
- Runs batted in: 1
- Win–loss record: 0–4
- Earned run average: 4.37
- Strikeouts: 9
- Stats at Baseball Reference

Teams
- New York Giants (1902); Philadelphia Phillies (1903)

Libeus "Libe" Washburn (June 16, 1874 – March 22, 1940) was an American professional baseball outfielder and pitcher. Washburn made his debut for the New York Giants as an outfielder in 1902. He had four hits in nine at-bats in six games. The following year, in 1903, he played for the Philadelphia Phillies as a pitcher, going 0–4 in four games.

Washburn was born in Lyme, New Hampshire and died in Malone, New York.
