= Lee DeMontreville =

American baseball player (1874–1962)

- Shortstop
- Born: September 23, 1874; Washington County, Minnesota, U.S.
- Died: March 22, 1962 (aged 87); Pelham Manor, New York, U.S.
- Batted: Right Threw: Right

MLB debut
- July 10, 1903, for the St. Louis Cardinals

Last MLB appearance
- September 26, 1903, for the St. Louis Cardinals

MLB statistics
- Batting average: .243
- Home runs: 0
- Runs batted in: 7
- Stats at Baseball Reference

Teams
- St. Louis Cardinals (1903)

Leon DeMontreville (September 23, 1874 – March 22, 1962) was an American professional baseball player. Primarily a shortstop, DeMontreville spent one season in the major leagues, with the St. Louis Cardinals in 1903. He appeared in 26 games and batted 82 times, posting a .243 batting average and collecting three stolen bases.

DeMontreville's older brother Gene DeMontreville was also a Major League Baseball player.
