= Charlie DeArmond =

American baseball player (1877–1933)

- Third baseman
- Born: February 13, 1877; Okeana, Ohio, U.S.
- Died: December 17, 1933 (aged 56); Morning Sun, Ohio, U.S.
- Batted: Right Threw: Right

MLB debut
- September 19, 1903, for the Cincinnati Reds

Last MLB appearance
- September 27, 1903, for the Cincinnati Reds

MLB statistics
- Batting average: .282
- Home runs: 0
- Runs batted in: 7
- Stats at Baseball Reference

Teams
- Cincinnati Reds (1903)

Charles Hommer DeArmond (February 13, 1877 – December 17, 1933) was an American Major League Baseball (MLB) third baseman. He played for the 1903 Cincinnati Reds. DeArmond died of lobar pneumonia, and is buried in Shandon, Ohio.
