= Rip Ragan =

American baseball player

- Pitcher
- Born: November 20, 1879; Greenfield, Indiana
- Died: March 17, 1945 (aged 65); Parsons, Kansas
- Batted: Right Threw: Right

MLB debut
- September 19, 1903, for the Cincinnati Reds

Last MLB appearance
- September 27, 1903, for the Cincinnati Reds

MLB statistics
- Win–loss record: 0–2
- Earned run average: 6.00
- Strikeouts: 7
- Stats at Baseball Reference

Teams
- Cincinnati Reds (1903)

Arthur Edgar "Rip" Ragan (June 5, 1878 – June 8, 1945) was a professional baseball player. He was a right-handed pitcher for one season (1903) with the Cincinnati Reds. For his career, he amassed a 0–2 record, with a 6.00 earned run average, and 7 strikeouts in 18 innings pitched.

He was born in Lincoln, Illinois and died in Parsons, Kansas at the age of 65.
