= Gene Curtis =

American baseball player (1883–1919)

- Outfielder
- Born: May 5, 1883; Bethany, West Virginia, U.S.
- Died: January 1, 1919 (aged 35); Steubenville, Ohio, U.S.
- Batted: Right Threw: Right

MLB debut
- September 21, 1903, for the Pittsburgh Pirates

Last MLB appearance
- September 26, 1903, for the Pittsburgh Pirates

MLB statistics
- Batting average: .421
- Home runs: 0
- Runs batted in: 3
- Stats at Baseball Reference

Teams
- Pittsburgh Pirates (1903)

Eugene Holmes Curtis (May 5, 1883 – January 1, 1919) was an American professional baseball player. He played in five games in Major League Baseball for the 1903 Pittsburgh Pirates as an outfielder. Nicknamed "Eude", he attended West Virginia University, where he played college baseball for the Mountaineers.
