= 1903 New York Giants season =

1903 New York Giants
- League: National League
- Ballpark: Polo Grounds
- City: New York City
- Record: 84–55 (.604)
- League place: 2nd
- Owners: John T. Brush
- Managers: John McGraw

The 1903 New York Giants season was the franchise's 21st season. The team finished in second place in the National League with an 84–55 record, 6.5 games behind the Pittsburgh Pirates—a dramatic improvement from their abysmal 48–88 record the previous season.

== Regular season ==
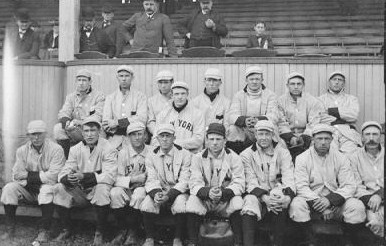
The 1903 New York Giants

=== Season standings ===
National League
| Team | W | L | Pct. | GB | Home | Road |
|---|---|---|---|---|---|---|
| Pittsburgh Pirates | 91 | 49 | .650 | — | 46‍–‍24 | 45‍–‍25 |
| New York Giants | 84 | 55 | .604 | 6½ | 41‍–‍27 | 43‍–‍28 |
| Chicago Cubs | 82 | 56 | .594 | 8 | 45‍–‍28 | 37‍–‍28 |
| Cincinnati Reds | 74 | 65 | .532 | 16½ | 41‍–‍35 | 33‍–‍30 |
| Brooklyn Superbas | 70 | 66 | .515 | 19 | 40‍–‍33 | 30‍–‍33 |
| Boston Beaneaters | 58 | 80 | .420 | 32 | 31‍–‍35 | 27‍–‍45 |
| Philadelphia Phillies | 49 | 86 | .363 | 39½ | 25‍–‍33 | 24‍–‍53 |
| St. Louis Cardinals | 43 | 94 | .314 | 46½ | 22‍–‍45 | 21‍–‍49 |

=== Record vs. opponents ===
1903 National League record Sources:
| Team | BSN | BRO | CHC | CIN | NYG | PHI | PIT | STL |
|---|---|---|---|---|---|---|---|---|
| Boston | — | 9–11 | 7–13–1 | 7–13 | 8–12 | 10–8–1 | 5–15 | 12–8 |
| Brooklyn | 11–9 | — | 8–12 | 10–10 | 7–12–2 | 11–8–1 | 9–11 | 14–4–1 |
| Chicago | 13–7–1 | 12–8 | — | 9–11 | 8–12 | 12–6 | 12–8 | 16–4 |
| Cincinnati | 13–7 | 10–10 | 11–9 | — | 12–10 | 12–8–2 | 4–16 | 12–7 |
| New York | 12–8 | 12–7–2 | 12–8 | 8–12 | — | 15–5 | 10–10 | 15–5–1 |
| Philadelphia | 8–10–1 | 8–11–1 | 6–12 | 8–12–2 | 5–15 | — | 4–16–1 | 10–10 |
| Pittsburgh | 15–5 | 11–9 | 8–12 | 16–4 | 10–10 | 16–4–1 | — | 15–5 |
| St. Louis | 8–12 | 4–14–1 | 4–16 | 7–12 | 5–15–1 | 10–10 | 5–15 | — |

=== Roster ===
1903 New York Giants
Roster
| Pitchers: Red Ames; Bill Bartley; Jack Cronin; Christy Mathewson; Joe McGinnity; Roscoe Miller; Dummy Taylor | Catchers: Frank Bowerman; Jack Warner; Infielders: Charlie Babb; George Davis; Jack Dunn; Billy Gilbert; Billy Lauder; Dan McGann; John McGraw | Outfielders: Roger Bresnahan; George Browne; Sam Mertes; George Van Haltren | Manager: John McGraw |

== Player stats ==
=== Batting ===
==== Starters by position ====
Note: Pos = Position; G = Games played; AB = At bats; H = Hits; Avg. = Batting average; HR = Home runs; RBI = Runs batted in

| Pos | Player | G | AB | H | Avg. | HR | RBI |
|---|---|---|---|---|---|---|---|
| C | Jack Warner | 89 | 285 | 81 | .284 | 0 | 34 |
| 1B | Dan McGann | 129 | 482 | 130 | .270 | 3 | 50 |
| 2B | Billy Gilbert | 128 | 413 | 104 | .252 | 1 | 40 |
| 3B | Billy Lauder | 108 | 395 | 111 | .281 | 0 | 53 |
| SS | Charlie Babb | 121 | 424 | 105 | .248 | 0 | 46 |
| OF | George Browne | 141 | 591 | 185 | .313 | 3 | 45 |
| OF | Sam Mertes | 138 | 517 | 145 | .280 | 7 | 104 |
| OF | Roger Bresnahan | 113 | 406 | 142 | .350 | 4 | 55 |

==== Other batters ====
Note: G = Games played; AB = At bats; H = Hits; Avg. = Batting average; HR = Home runs; RBI = Runs batted in

| Player | G | AB | H | Avg. | HR | RBI |
|---|---|---|---|---|---|---|
| George Van Haltren | 84 | 280 | 72 | .257 | 0 | 28 |
| Jack Dunn | 78 | 257 | 62 | .241 | 0 | 37 |
| Frank Bowerman | 64 | 210 | 58 | .276 | 1 | 31 |
| George Davis | 4 | 15 | 4 | .267 | 0 | 1 |
| John McGraw | 12 | 11 | 3 | .273 | 0 | 1 |

=== Pitching ===
==== Starting pitchers ====
Note: G = Games pitched; IP = Innings pitched; W = Wins; L = Losses; ERA = Earned run average; SO = Strikeouts

| Player | G | IP | W | L | ERA | SO |
|---|---|---|---|---|---|---|
| Joe McGinnity | 55 | 434.0 | 31 | 20 | 2.43 | 171 |
| Christy Mathewson | 45 | 366.1 | 30 | 13 | 2.26 | 267 |
| Dummy Taylor | 33 | 244.2 | 13 | 13 | 4.23 | 94 |
| Red Ames | 2 | 14.0 | 2 | 0 | 1.29 | 14 |

==== Other pitchers ====
Note: G = Games pitched; IP = Innings pitched; W = Wins; L = Losses; ERA = Earned run average; SO = Strikeouts

| Player | G | IP | W | L | ERA | SO |
|---|---|---|---|---|---|---|
| Jack Cronin | 20 | 115.2 | 6 | 4 | 3.81 | 50 |
| Roscoe Miller | 15 | 85.0 | 2 | 5 | 4.13 | 30 |

==== Relief pitchers ====
Note: G = Games pitched; W = Wins; L = Losses; SV = Saves; ERA = Earned run average; SO = Strikeouts

| Player | G | W | L | SV | ERA | SO |
|---|---|---|---|---|---|---|
| Bill Bartley | 1 | 0 | 0 | 0 | 0.00 | 2 |
