= Ernie Diehl =

American baseball player (1877–1958)

- Outfielder
- Born: October 2, 1877; Cincinnati, Ohio, U.S.
- Died: November 6, 1958 (aged 81); Miami, Florida, U.S.
- Batted: Right Threw: Right

MLB debut
- May 31, 1903, for the Pittsburgh Pirates

Last MLB appearance
- August 12, 1909, for the Boston Doves

MLB statistics
- Batting average: .255
- Hits: 14
- Stats at Baseball Reference

Teams
- Pittsburgh Pirates (1903–1904); Boston Beaneaters/Doves (1906; 1909)

Ernest Guy Diehl (October 2, 1877 – November 6, 1958) was an American Major League Baseball outfielder who played for four seasons. He played for the Pittsburgh Pirates from 1903 to 1904, and the Boston Beaneaters/Doves in 1906 and 1909.

He served as the head baseball coach at the University of Cincinnati in 1910.

Diehl also played tennis. At the Cincinnati Open he:

- reached two singles semifinals (1899 & 1903)
- reached two singles quarterfinals (1902 & 1904)
- reached the singles round of 16 twice (1900 & 1901)
- won two doubles titles (1902 & 1903, both with Nat Emerson)
- won one mixed doubles title (1902) and reached another mixed doubles final (1903), both with Winona Closterman)
- reached another doubles final (1900, with Nat Emerson)
