= Larry Milton =

American baseball player (1879–1942)

- Pitcher
- Born: May 4, 1879; Owensboro, Kentucky
- Died: May 15, 1942 (aged 63); Tulsa, Oklahoma
- Batted: Unknown Threw: Right

MLB debut
- May 7, 1903, for the St. Louis Cardinals

Last MLB appearance
- May 7, 1903, for the St. Louis Cardinals

MLB statistics
- Win–loss record: 0-0
- Earned run average: 2.25
- Strikeouts: 0
- Stats at Baseball Reference

Teams
- St. Louis Cardinals (1903)

Samuel Lawrence Milton (May 4, 1879 – May 15, 1942), nicknamed "Tug", was a professional baseball player who played pitcher in the Major Leagues in 1903 for the St. Louis Cardinals.
