= Henry Boney =

American baseball player (1903-2002)

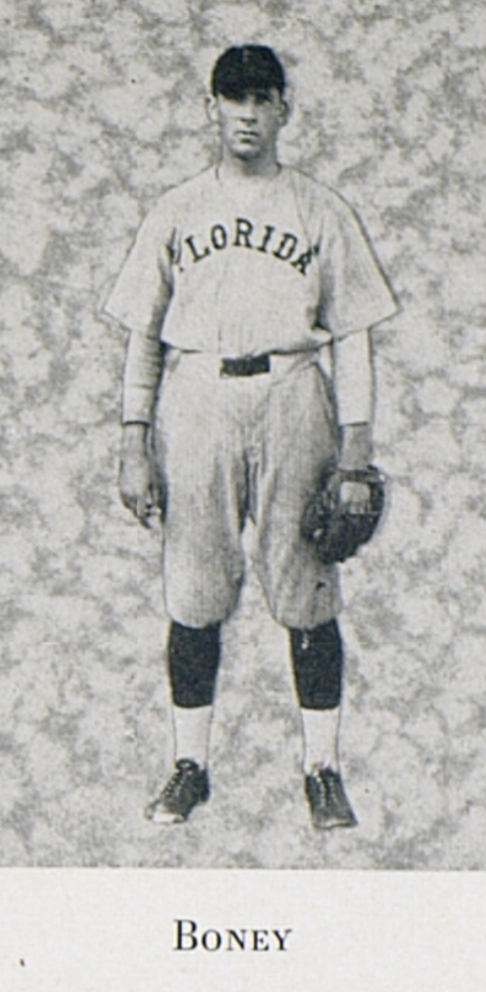
- Pitcher
- Born: October 28, 1903; Wallace, North Carolina
- Died: June 12, 2002 (aged 98); Lake Worth, Florida
- Batted: Left Threw: Right

MLB debut
- June 28, 1927, for the New York Giants

Last MLB appearance
- July 13, 1927, for the New York Giants

MLB statistics
- Win–loss record: 0–0
- Earned run average: 2.25
- Strikeouts: 0
- Stats at Baseball Reference

Teams
- New York Giants (1927)

Henry Tate Boney (October 28, 1903 – June 12, 2002) was an American professional baseball player who was a relief pitcher in Major League Baseball during part of the 1927 season. Boney appeared in three games, all in relief, for the New York Giants.

Boney was born in Wallace, North Carolina. He attended the University of Florida in Gainesville, where he played for coach Lance Richbourg and coach Brady Cowell's Florida Gators baseball teams in 1926 and 1927.

Boney made his major league debut as 23-year-old rookie against the Philadelphia Phillies at Baker Bowl on June 28, 1927. He made his third and final relief appearance on July 13. Boney finished all three games in which he appeared, and pitched a total of four innings, giving up just one earned run. Boney's record was 0–0 with a 2.25 earned run average.

== See also ==
- Florida Gators
- List of Florida Gators baseball players
