= James Potter (baseball) =

American baseball executive (1864–1934)

James Potter (April 7, 1864 – April 15, 1934) was an American businessman who served as president of the Philadelphia Phillies from 1903 to 1904.

== Early life ==
Potter was born in Savannah, Georgia, on April 7, 1864, to John Hamilton and Alice Beirne (Steimbergen) Potter. His father was a United States Civil War veteran who served with the Confederate States Army. Potter was educated in Baltimore and at St. Paul's School in Concord, New Hampshire. He attended Princeton University, but left after his junior year. On June 4, 1885, he married Elizabeth Perkins Sturgis. They had three children: Elizabeth Sturgis, John Hamilton and Robert Sturgis Porter. On January 27, 1908, Elizabeth Sturgis Porter married Frank Polk.

== Business career ==
From 1888 to 1899, Potter worked for the Baltimore and Ohio Railroad, where he rose to the position of Division Passenger Agent. He then entered the newspaper business as general manager of the Philadelphia Evening Telegraph. He then managed the Philadelphia branch of Marshall, Spader and Co., a stock brokerage firm. In 1908, Marshall, Spader and Co. closed their Philadelphia office and Potter took over management of the Public Ledger. From 1913 until his death in 1934 he was a general agent for the Cunard Line.

== Sports ==
Potter won championships in both racquets and court tennis. He helped organize the Racquet Club of Philadelphia and was the club's president for its first 17 years of existence.

In 1903, Potter led a syndicate that purchased the Philadelphia Phillies from Al Reach & John Rogers. On March 3, 1903, Potter was elected president of the club. On November 30, 1904, he was succeeded as president by Bill Shettsline. On February 23, 1909, Potter sold his shares to Israel Wilson Durham.
