= Clarence Currie =

Canadian baseball player (1878–1941)

- Pitcher
- Born: December 30, 1878; Windsor, Ontario, Canada
- Died: July 15, 1941 (aged 62); Little Chute, Wisconsin, U.S.
- Batted: Right Threw: Right

MLB debut
- April 25, 1902, for the Cincinnati Reds

Last MLB appearance
- September 21, 1903, for the Chicago Cubs

MLB statistics
- Win–loss record: 15–23
- Earned run average: 3.39
- Strikeouts: 111
- Stats at Baseball Reference

Teams
- Cincinnati Reds (1902); St. Louis Cardinals (1902–1903); Chicago Cubs (1903)

Clarence Franklin Currie (December 30, 1878 – July 15, 1941) was a Canadian professional baseball player who played as a pitcher in the Major Leagues in 1902–1903. He played for the St. Louis Cardinals, Cincinnati Reds, and Chicago Cubs.
