= Jack Coveney =

American baseball player (1880–1961)

- Catcher
- Born: June 10, 1880; South Natick, Massachusetts, U.S.
- Died: March 28, 1961 (aged 80); Wayland, Massachusetts, U.S.
- Batted: Right Threw: Right

MLB debut
- September 19, 1903, for the St. Louis Cardinals

Last MLB appearance
- September 27, 1903, for the St. Louis Cardinals

MLB statistics
- Games played: 4
- At bats: 14
- Hits: 2
- Stats at Baseball Reference

Teams
- St. Louis Cardinals (1903)

John Patrick Coveney (June 10, 1880 – March 28, 1961) was an American catcher in Major League Baseball. He played for the St. Louis Cardinals in 1903.
