= Dan Kerwin =

American baseball player (1874–1960)

- Outfielder
- Born: July 9, 1874; Philadelphia, Pennsylvania, U.S.
- Died: July 13, 1960 (aged 86); Philadelphia, Pennsylvania, U.S.
- Batted: Left Threw: Left

MLB debut
- September 27, 1903, for the Cincinnati Reds

Last MLB appearance
- September 27, 1903, for the Cincinnati Reds

MLB statistics
- Games played: 2
- At bats: 6
- Hits: 4
- Stats at Baseball Reference

Teams
- Cincinnati Reds (1903)

Daniel Patrick Kerwin (July 9, 1874 – July 13, 1960) was an American outfielder in Major League Baseball. He played for the Cincinnati Reds in 1903.
