= Art Weaver =

American baseball player (1879–1917)

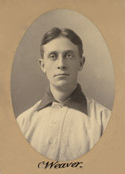
- Catcher
- Born: April 7, 1879; Wichita, Kansas, U.S.
- Died: March 23, 1917 (aged 37); Denver, Colorado, U.S.
- Batted: Unknown Threw: Right

MLB debut
- September 14, 1902, for the St. Louis Cardinals

Last MLB appearance
- August 8, 1908, for the Chicago White Sox

MLB statistics
- Batting average: .183
- Home runs: 0
- Runs batted in: 15
- Stats at Baseball Reference

Teams
- St. Louis Cardinals (1902–1903); Pittsburgh Pirates (1903); St. Louis Browns (1905); Chicago White Sox (1908)

Arthur Coggshall Weaver (April 7, 1879 – March 23, 1917) was an American Major League Baseball player. He was born in Wichita, Kansas, and died in Denver, Colorado. Weaver played for four teams from 1902 to 1908, playing most of his games at catcher.

Asthma-related complications brought Weaver's career to a premature end, and contributed to his early death at the age of 37.
