= Phil Piton =

American sports executive (1903–1983)

- Born: January 14, 1903; Columbus, Ohio, U.S.
- Died: January 23, 1983 (aged 80); Columbus, Ohio, U.S.
- Occupation: Minor League Baseball president
- Years active: 1964–1971

Phillip P. Piton (January 14, 1903 – January 23, 1983) was an American baseball executive whose most significant role was as president of the National Association of Professional Baseball Leagues from 1964 through 1971. He was born in Columbus, Ohio.

== Early life ==
Piton was a valuable collaborator to baseball commissioner Kenesaw Mountain Landis during 15 years. In this lapse of time, Piton excelled as an operator within the professional baseball industry. He retired temporarily from the commissioner’s office during World War II, but returned to the baseball activities when George Trautman was elected as the National Association of Professional Baseball Leagues president in 1947.

Following his retirement in 1971, Piton turned over 20 leagues and 155 clubs to his successor Hank Peters and, while attendance still was not improving, the downward slide had ended and the upward progression began its call.

Piton died in 1983 in Columbus, Ohio, just nine days after his 80th birthday.
