= 1903 in baseball =

The following are the baseball events of the year 1903 throughout the world.

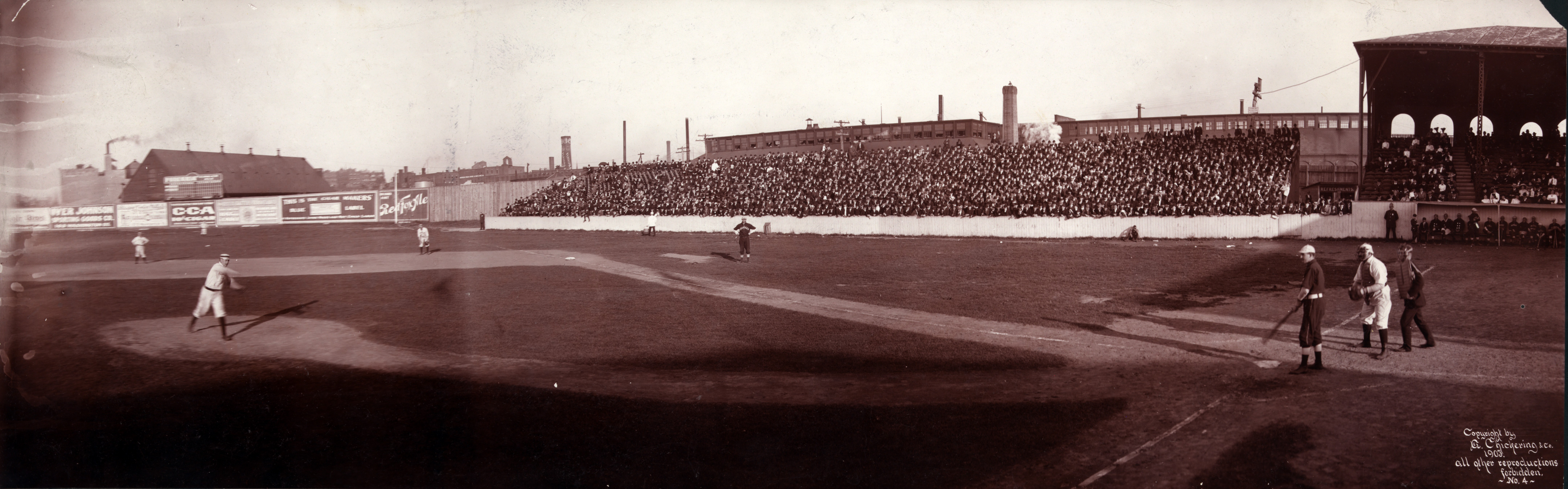
1903 Boston vs Chicago at Huntington Avenue Grounds

== Champions ==
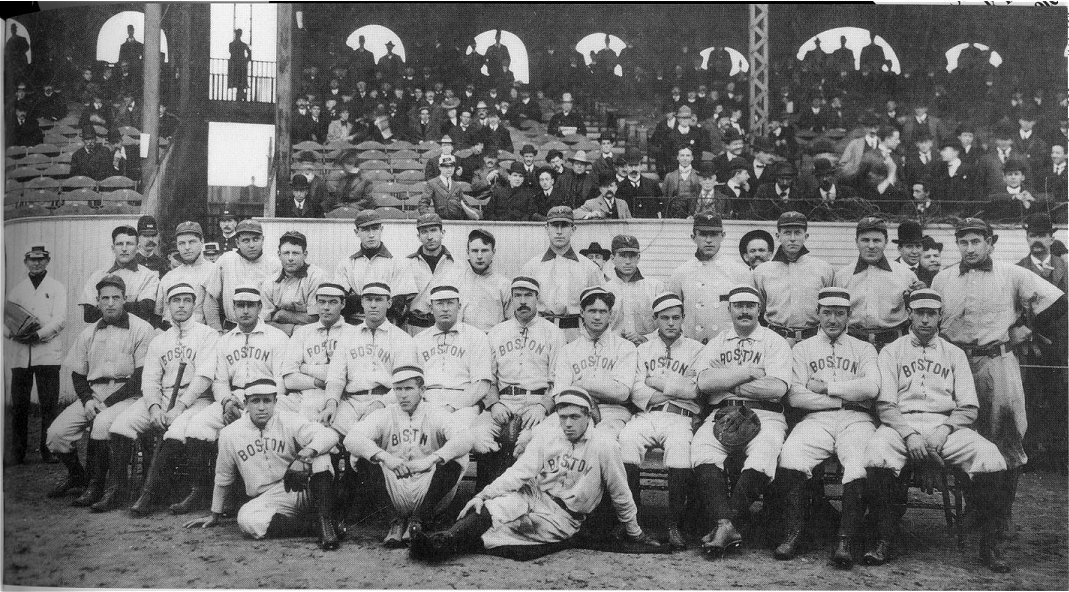
The Boston Americans and Pittsburgh Pirates during the 1903 World Series at Huntington Avenue Grounds.

=== Major League Baseball ===
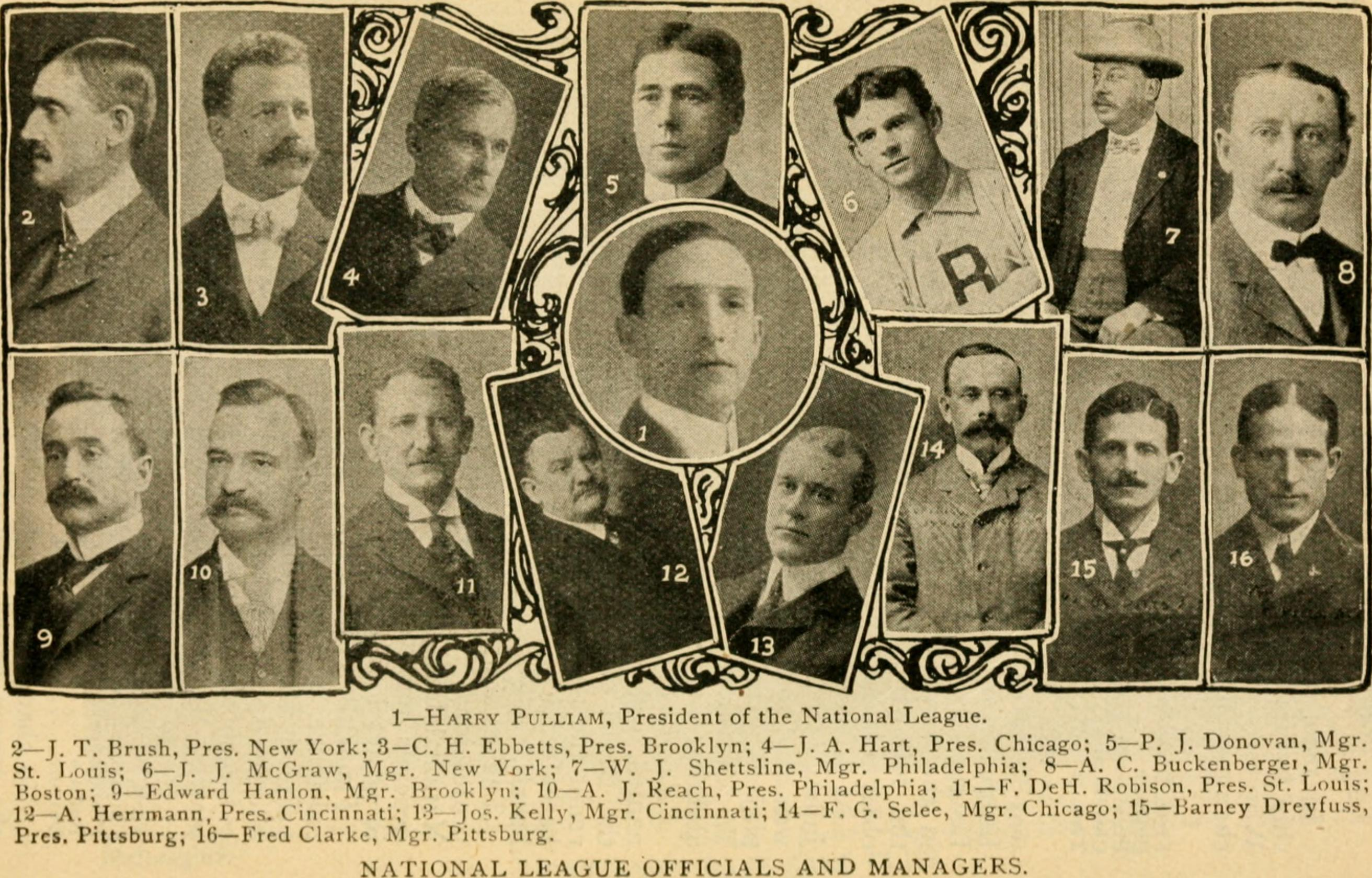
National League officials and managers in 1903

American League

- Boston Americans

National League

- Pittsburgh Pirates

World Series

- World Series: Boston Americans over Pittsburgh Pirates (5–3), in the first modern World Series

=== Minor League Baseball ===
American Association

- St. Paul Saints

Central League

- Fort Wayne Railroaders

Connecticut League

- Holyoke Paperweights

Cotton States League

- Baton Rouge Red Sticks

Eastern League

- Jersey City Skeeters

Hudson River League

- Hudson Marines

Illinois–Indiana–Iowa League

- Bloomington Bloomers

Kentucky–Illinois–Tennessee League

- Cairo Egyptians

Missouri Valley League

- Sedalia Goldbugs

New England League

- Lowell Tigers

New York State League

- Schenectady Frog Alleys

Northern League

- Winnipeg Maroons

Pacific Coast League

- Los Angeles Angels

Pacific National League

- Butte Miners

Southern Association

- Memphis Egyptians

Southwest Washington League

- Aberdeen Pippins

Texas League

- Dallas Giants

Western League

- Milwaukee Creams

=== College baseball ===
National title

- Princeton Tigers

Western Conference

- Illinois Fighting Illini

== Statistical leaders ==
	American League		National League	
Stat	Player	Total	Player	Total
AVG	Nap Lajoie (CLE)	.344	Honus Wagner (PIT)	.355
HR	Buck Freeman (BOS)	13	Jimmy Sheckard (BRO)	9
RBI	Buck Freeman (BOS)	104	Sam Mertes (NYG)	104
W	Cy Young (BOS)	28	Joe McGinnity (NYG)	31
ERA	Earl Moore (CLE)	1.74	Sam Leever (PIT)	2.06
K	Rube Waddell (PHA)	302	Christy Mathewson (NYG)	267

== Major league baseball final standings ==
=== American League final standings ===
American League
Team	W	L	Pct.	GB	Home	Road
Boston Americans	91	47	.659	—	49‍–‍20	42‍–‍27
Philadelphia Athletics	75	60	.556	14½	44‍–‍21	31‍–‍39
Cleveland Naps	77	63	.550	15	49‍–‍25	28‍–‍38
New York Highlanders	72	62	.537	17	41‍–‍26	31‍–‍36
Detroit Tigers	65	71	.478	25	37‍–‍28	28‍–‍43
St. Louis Browns	65	74	.468	26½	38‍–‍32	27‍–‍42
Chicago White Stockings	60	77	.438	30½	41‍–‍28	19‍–‍49
Washington Senators	43	94	.314	47½	29‍–‍40	14‍–‍54

Locations of teams for the 1903 American League season
American League

=== National League final standings ===
National League
Team	W	L	Pct.	GB	Home	Road
Pittsburgh Pirates	91	49	.650	—	46‍–‍24	45‍–‍25
New York Giants	84	55	.604	6½	41‍–‍27	43‍–‍28
Chicago Cubs	82	56	.594	8	45‍–‍28	37‍–‍28
Cincinnati Reds	74	65	.532	16½	41‍–‍35	33‍–‍30
Brooklyn Superbas	70	66	.515	19	40‍–‍33	30‍–‍33
Boston Beaneaters	58	80	.420	32	31‍–‍35	27‍–‍45
Philadelphia Phillies	49	86	.363	39½	25‍–‍33	24‍–‍53
St. Louis Cardinals	43	94	.314	46½	22‍–‍45	21‍–‍49

Locations of teams for the 1903–1906 National League seasons
National League

== Events ==
- January 3 – Frank J. Farrell and Bill Devery pay $18,000 ($645,000 in 2025) for the defunct American League franchise in Baltimore and relocate the team to New York and called them the Highlanders. The Highlanders would years later receive a new team name and become the New York Yankees.
- January 10 – the National Agreement of 1903 is reached between the National League and American League thus ending the baseball "war" between the leagues—they agree to recognize each other as major leagues, and codify the reserve clause system that remains in place for the next seven decades.
- January 13 – Win Mercer, recently appointed player-manager of the Detroit Tigers, dies by suicide on January 13, 1903, in San Francisco during a barnstorming tour. Mercer reportedly had a gambling problem.
- February 17 – The Brooklyn Superbas purchase the contracts of pitcher Rube Vickers and outfielder Henry Thielman from the Cincinnati Reds.
- March 7 – The Detroit Tigers trade pitcher/infielder Kid Gleason to the New York Giants for second baseman Heinie Smith
- April 20 – Future hall of fame pitcher Chief Bender makes his major league debut for the Philadelphia Athletics at the age of 18.
- May 6 – The Chicago White Stockings committed twelve errors, and the Detroit Tigers answered back with six of their own. The combined "18-E debacle" set a modern Major League record for the most errors (by two teams) in a single game.
- May 7 – Pittsburgh Pirates outfielder Fred Clarke hits for the cycle for the second time in his career. The Pirates lose to the Cincinnati Reds, however, 11–8.
- June 21 – Boston Americans outfielder Buck Freeman hits for the cycle in a 12–7 Boston win over the Cleveland Naps.
- June 25 – Wiley Piatt of the Boston Beaneaters became the only pitcher in the 20th century to lose two complete games in one day. Piatt allowed fourteen hits, while striking out twelve, en route to 1–0 and 5–3 St. Louis Cardinals victories.
- June 29 – Patsy Dougherty, outfielder for the Boston Americans, hits for the cycle against the Chicago White Stockings leading Boston to a 7–2 win.
- July 1 – Cy Young drives in the lone run to lead Boston to a 1–0 victory over Chicago.
- July 2 – Jack Doscher, a pitcher for the Chicago Cubs, becomes the first son of a former major league player to play in the majors. His father, Herm Doscher, played from 1872–1882 as a journeyman outfielder/infielder.
- July 16 – The Detroit Tigers acquired Paddy Greene from the New York Highlanders in exchange for John Deering.
- August 1 – Joe McGinnity becomes the first pitcher to win two complete games in one day, with 4–1 and 5–2 victories for the New York Giants over the Boston Beaneaters in a doubleheader.
- August 17 – The Detroit Tigers release second baseman Heinie Smith, whom they acquired via trade prior to the start of the season.
- September 3 – Cleveland Naps rookie Jesse Stovall tosses an 11-inning shutout, 1–0, over the Detroit Tigers. The feat still remains as the longest shutout ever for a major league pitching debut.
- September 18 – Chick Fraser pitches a no-hitter for the Philadelphia Phillies in the second game of a doubleheader against the Chicago Cubs. The Phillies win, 10–0.
- September 24 – Cleveland Naps third baseman Bill Bradley hits for the cycle against the Washington Senators in a 12–2 Cleveland win.
- October 1 – In Game 1 of the first modern World Series in Major League Baseball, Pittsburgh Pirates outfielder Jimmy Sebring becomes the first player to hit a home run in the World Series when he connects for a solo shot off of Boston's Cy Young in the seventh inning. The Pirates beat the Americans, 7–3.
- October 2 – Boston Americans outfielder Patsy Dougherty becomes the first player to hit multiple home runs in a World Series game when he hits solo home runs in the first and sixth inning of Game 2 in Boston's 3–0 win over the Pittsburgh Pirates.
- October 13 – The Boston Americans defeat the Pittsburgh Pirates, 3–0, in Game 8 of the first World Series. Boston wins the series, five games to three.

== Births ==
=== January ===
- January 3 – Herb Bradley
- January 4 – Alex Metzler
- January 6 – Ike Eichrodt
- January 6 – George Grant
- January 6 – Mul Holland
- January 14 – Phil Piton
- January 14 – Russ Scarritt
- January 15 – Tom Oliver
- January 18 – Nolen Richardson
- January 19 – Fred Lucas
- January 19 – Merle Settlemire
- January 23 – Jack Saltzgaver
- January 24 – Clay Touchstone
- January 27 – Art Reinholz
- January 27 – Earl Williams
- January 31 – Abie Hood

=== February ===
- February 1 – Carl Reynolds
- February 3 – Joe Stripp
- February 10 – Walt Lerian
- February 10 – Johnny Lucas
- February 10 – George Quellich
- February 12 – Chick Hafey
- February 12 – Andy Harrington
- February 14 – Uel Eubanks
- February 21 – Tom Yawkey
- February 23 – Roy Johnson

=== March ===
- March 2 – Art Mills
- March 5 – Chick Autry
- March 11 – Buster Ross
- March 11 – Art Ruble
- March 27 – Joe Dwyer

=== April ===
- April 4 – Les Bartholomew
- April 6 – Mickey Cochrane
- April 8 – Frank Mulroney
- April 13 – Ken Jones
- April 16 – Paul Waner
- April 17 – Elmer Miller
- April 17 – Bob Osborn
- April 24 – Jimmy Moore
- April 25 – John Wilson
- April 26 – Dale Alexander
- April 28 – Fred Schemanske

=== May ===
- May 1 – Fritz Knothe
- May 11 – Charlie Gehringer
- May 14 – Doc Land
- May 17 – Cool Papa Bell
- May 22 – Mel Kerr
- May 23 – Charlie Sullivan
- May 24 – Jack Berly

=== June ===
- June 3 – Chappie Geygan
- June 5 – Billy Urbanski
- June 9 – Mike Ryba
- June 13 – Carroll Yerkes
- June 17 – Ben Shields
- June 19 – Lou Gehrig
- June 22 – Carl Hubbell
- June 26 – Babe Herman
- June 26 – George Milstead

=== July ===
- July 8 – Clint Brown
- July 10 – Johnny Niggeling
- July 12 – George Darrow
- July 18 – Hod Kibbie
- July 20 – Howard Maple
- July 28 – George Gerken

=== August ===
- August 6 – Jim Turner
- August 6 – Hal Wiltse
- August 8 – Clise Dudley
- August 13 – Steve Swetonic
- August 19 – Estel Crabtree
- August 27 – Charlie Engle
- August 27 – Marv Gudat
- August 29 – Jack Warner

=== September ===
- September 1 – Foster Edwards
- September 1 – Freddie Moncewicz
- September 6 – Tommy Thevenow
- September 7 – Curt Davis
- September 7 – Nap Kloza
- September 7 – Al Van Camp
- September 12 – Len Dondero
- September 13 – Rabbit Warstler
- September 19 – Carl Lind
- September 22 – Chuck Hostetler
- September 28 – Jim Brillheart
- September 28 – Hank Grampp

=== October ===
- October 4 – Lefty Thomas
- October 7 – Bill Walker
- October 9 – Walter O'Malley
- October 9 – Jack Tising
- October 10 – Fay Thomas
- October 12 – Jack Crouch
- October 12 – Dutch Holland
- October 15 – Mule Haas
- October 18 – Yats Wuestling
- October 20 – Archie Campbell
- October 28 – Hank Boney
- October 30 – Mickey Heath

=== November ===
- November 2 – Elon Hogsett
- November 2 – Travis Jackson
- November 13 – Si Rosenthal
- November 18 – George Blackerby
- November 23 – Joe Muich
- November 25 – Jim Weaver
- November 27 – Bill Hohman

=== December ===
- December 2 – Don Brennan
- December 6 – Tony Lazzeri
- December 11 – Ray Phelps
- December 13 – Al Smith
- December 14 – Jim Moore
- December 17 – Ted Trent
- December 25 – Red Barnes

== Deaths ==
- January 12 – Win Mercer, 28, pitcher for four teams from 1894 to 1902, who posted two 20-win seasons and led the National League in games started, shutouts, and saves in the 1897 season.
- January 13 – Pete Conway, 36, pitcher who posted a 61–61 record for four teams from 1885 to 1889.
- February 6 – Hardie Henderson, 40, pitcher who went 81–121 with four teams between 1883 and 1888.
- February 11 – Sam McMackin, [?], pitcher who played with the Chicago White Stockings and Detroit Tigers in the 1902 season.
- February 15 – Phil Reccius, 40, played third base for eight seasons, most notably for the Louisville Eclipse/Colonels.
- February 20 – Al Dwight, 47, pitcher for the 1884 Kansas City Cowboys.
- March 19 – John Conkey, 83, Boston businessman who co-founded the Boston Red Stockings of the National Association, predecessor of the modern Braves franchise, in 1871 and served as its president in 1871–1872.
- May 2 – Odie Porter, 25, pitcher who played briefly for the 1902 Philadelphia Athletics.
- May 3 – Count Sensenderfer, 55, played for the Philadelphia Athletics from 1871 to 1874. Later became a politician.
- May 13 – Thomas Lynch, 40, pitcher who played for the Chicago White Stockings in the 1884 season.
- May 16 – Chicken Wolf, 41, right fielder for 11 years, 10 with the Louisville Colonels.
- June 22 – Fatty Briody, 44, catcher for eight seasons from 1880 to 1888.
- July 1 – Jimmy Cooney, 37, shortstop for the Chicago Colts and Washington Senators National League teams from 1890 to 1892.
- July 2 – Ed Delahanty, 35, slugging left fielder since 1888, a three-time .400 hitter who ranked second only to Cap Anson in career hits; died after falling from a railroad trestle crossing the Niagara River.
- August 1 – Charlie Bohn, 47, outfielder/pitcher who played for the 1882 Louisville Eclipse.
- August 2 – Bill Sweeney, [?], pitcher/outfielder for the 1882 Philadelphia Athletics and the 1884 Baltimore Monumentals.
- August 21 – Andy Leonard, 57, left fielder for the original Cincinnati Red Stockings, the first fully professional baseball team.
- October 10 – John Valentine, 47, umpire from 1884 to 1888, who previously pitched for the 1883 Columbus Buckeyes.
- October 22 – Joe Yingling, 36, pitcher for the 1886 Washington Nationals.
- November 5 – Harrison Peppers, 37, pitcher for the Louisville Colonels during the 1894 season.
- November 12 – John Gilbert, 39, shortstop for the 1890 Pittsburgh Alleghenys.
- November 28 – Jack Easton, 38, pitcher who posted a 26–29 record in 76 games for the Columbus Solons, St. Louis Browns, and Pittsburgh Pirates from 1889 to 1894.
- December 30 – Dan Leahy, 33, shortstop for the 1896 Philadelphia Phillies.
- December 31 – Joe McGuckin, 41, outfielder for the 1890 Baltimore Orioles of the American Association.
