= 1903 Major League Baseball season =

1903 MLB season
- League: American League (AL); National League (NL)
- Sport: Baseball
- Duration: Regular season: April 20 – September 27, 1903 (AL); April 16 – September 29, 1903 (NL); World Series: October 1–13, 1903
- Games: 140
- Teams: 16 (8 per league)

Pennant winners
- AL champions: Boston Americans
- AL runners-up: Philadelphia Athletics
- NL champions: Pittsburgh Pirates
- NL runners-up: New York Giants

World Series
- Champions: Boston Americans
- Runners-up: Pittsburgh Pirates

MLB seasons
- ← 1902 1904 →

Locations of teams for the 1903 American League season
American League
Locations of teams for the 1903–1906 National League seasons
National League

The 1903 major league baseball season began on April 16, 1903. The regular season ended on September 29, with the Pittsburgh Pirates and the Boston Americans as regular season champions of the National League and American League, respectively. The postseason began with Game 1 of the first modern World Series on October 1 and ended with Game 8 on October 13. The Americans defeated the Pirates, five games to three, capturing their first championship in franchise history.

The 1903 season saw the return of a postseason championship series, the World Series, following the one-off 1900 Chronicle-Telegraph Cup. It was also the first inter-league series since the 1890 World's Championship Series between the National League and defunct-since-1891 American Association. The 1903 World Series would also mark the first championship series that is still celebrated today, as all previous series are considered pre-modern and these early contests are discussed by MLB and baseball historians separately. However, the 1903 arrangement was primarily between the two participating clubs rather than a formal arrangement between the leagues, essentially making this season's World Series a voluntary event.

The defunct Baltimore Orioles were replaced by a new franchise in New York City known as the New York Highlanders; it was the last change to the lineup of AL and NL franchises until 1953. The American League would not return to Baltimore until the St. Louis Browns relocated there as a new Baltimore Orioles in 1954. The Chicago Orphans and Cleveland Bronchos were renamed as the Chicago Cubs and Cleveland Naps, respectively.

== Schedule ==
The 1903 schedule consisted of 140 games for all teams in the American League and National League, each of which had eight teams. Each team was scheduled to play 20 games against the other seven teams of their respective league. This continued the format put in place for the 1901 season. This would be the last season with this format, as the following season would see an increase of games played.

National League Opening Day took place on April 16 with four teams playing, while American League Opening Day did not take place until April 20, with a doubleheader between the Philadelphia Athletics and the Boston Americans. The National League would see its final day of the regular season on September 27, while the American League would see its final day of the season on September 29. The inaugural World Series took place between October 1 and October 13.

== Rule changes ==
The 1903 season saw the following rule changes:

- The pitcher's mound height was capped at 15 inches.
- Previously adopted by the National league in 1901, the American League adopted the rule that foul balls are to count as strike balls, except after two strikes. Previously, foul balls would not affect the count. To cut the cost of lost foul balls, the committee urges that batters who foul off good strikes are to be disciplined.
- A unified balk rule was agreed on, stating "a balk shall constitute any delivery of the ball to the batsman by the pitcher while either foot of the pitcher is back of the plate."

== Teams ==
An asterisk (*) denotes the ballpark a team played the minority of their home games at

League	Team	City	Ballpark	Capacity	Manager
American League	Boston Americans	Boston, Massachusetts	Huntington Avenue Grounds	11,500	Jimmy Collins
American League	Chicago White Stockings	Chicago, Illinois	South Side Park	14,000	Jimmy Callahan
American League	Cleveland Naps	Cleveland, Ohio	League Park (Cleveland)	9,000	Bill Armour
American League	Detroit Tigers	Detroit, Michigan	Bennett Park	8,500	Ed Barrow
American League	New York Highlanders	New York, New York	Hilltop Park	16,000	Clark Griffith
American League	Philadelphia Athletics	Philadelphia, Pennsylvania	Columbia Park	9,500	Connie Mack
American League	St. Louis Browns	St. Louis, Missouri	Sportsman's Park	8,000	Jimmy McAleer
American League	Washington Senators	Washington, D.C.	American League Park	7,000	Tom Loftus
National League	Boston Beaneaters	Boston, Massachusetts	South End Grounds	6,600	Al Buckenberger
National League	Brooklyn Superbas	New York, New York	Washington Park	12,000	Ned Hanlon
National League	Chicago Cubs	Chicago, Illinois	West Side Park	13,000	Frank Selee
National League	Cincinnati Reds	Cincinnati, Ohio	Palace of the Fans	12,000	Joe Kelley
National League	New York Giants	New York, New York	Polo Grounds	16,000	John McGraw
National League	Philadelphia Phillies	Philadelphia, Pennsylvania	National League Park	18,000	Chief Zimmer
National League	Philadelphia Phillies	Philadelphia, Pennsylvania	Columbia Park*	9,500*	Chief Zimmer
National League	Pittsburgh Pirates	Allegheny, Pennsylvania	Exposition Park	16,000	Fred Clarke
National League	St. Louis Cardinals	St. Louis, Missouri	League Park (St. Louis)	15,200	Patsy Donovan

=== Sunday games ===
Blue laws restricted Sunday activities in several localities, causing several teams to play at ballparks in a different locality.

Team	City	Ballpark	Capacity	Games played
Boston Beaneaters	Warwick, Rhode Island	Rocky Point State Park	Unknown	1
Cleveland Naps	Canton, Ohio	Mahaffey Park	Unknown	2
Cleveland Naps	Columbus, Ohio	Neil Park	6,000	1
Detroit Tigers	Toledo, Ohio	Armory Park	Unknown	2
Detroit Tigers	East Grand Rapids, Michigan	Ramona Park	Unknown	1

1. In today's Pittsburgh, Pennsylvania.

== Standings ==
=== American League ===
American League
Team	W	L	Pct.	GB	Home	Road
Boston Americans	91	47	.659	—	49‍–‍20	42‍–‍27
Philadelphia Athletics	75	60	.556	14½	44‍–‍21	31‍–‍39
Cleveland Naps	77	63	.550	15	49‍–‍25	28‍–‍38
New York Highlanders	72	62	.537	17	41‍–‍26	31‍–‍36
Detroit Tigers	65	71	.478	25	37‍–‍28	28‍–‍43
St. Louis Browns	65	74	.468	26½	38‍–‍32	27‍–‍42
Chicago White Stockings	60	77	.438	30½	41‍–‍28	19‍–‍49
Washington Senators	43	94	.314	47½	29‍–‍40	14‍–‍54

=== National League ===
National League
Team	W	L	Pct.	GB	Home	Road
Pittsburgh Pirates	91	49	.650	—	46‍–‍24	45‍–‍25
New York Giants	84	55	.604	6½	41‍–‍27	43‍–‍28
Chicago Cubs	82	56	.594	8	45‍–‍28	37‍–‍28
Cincinnati Reds	74	65	.532	16½	41‍–‍35	33‍–‍30
Brooklyn Superbas	70	66	.515	19	40‍–‍33	30‍–‍33
Boston Beaneaters	58	80	.420	32	31‍–‍35	27‍–‍45
Philadelphia Phillies	49	86	.363	39½	25‍–‍33	24‍–‍53
St. Louis Cardinals	43	94	.314	46½	22‍–‍45	21‍–‍49

=== Tie games ===
15 tie games (6 in AL, 9 in NL), which are not factored into winning percentage or games behind (and were often replayed again), occurred throughout the season.

==== American League ====
- Boston Americans, 3
- Chicago White Stockings, 1
- Detroit Tigers, 1
- New York Highlanders, 2
- Philadelphia Athletics, 2
- Washington Senators, 3

==== National League ====
- Boston Beaneaters, 2
- Brooklyn Superbas, 3
- Chicago Cubs, 1
- Cincinnati Reds, 2
- New York Giants, 3
- Philadelphia Phillies, 4
- Pittsburgh Pirates, 1
- St. Louis Cardinals, 2

== Postseason ==
The postseason began on October 1 and ended on October 13 with the Boston Americans defeating the Pittsburgh Pirates in the 1903 World Series in eight games.

=== Bracket ===
World Series
AL	Boston Americans	5
NL	Pittsburgh Pirates	3

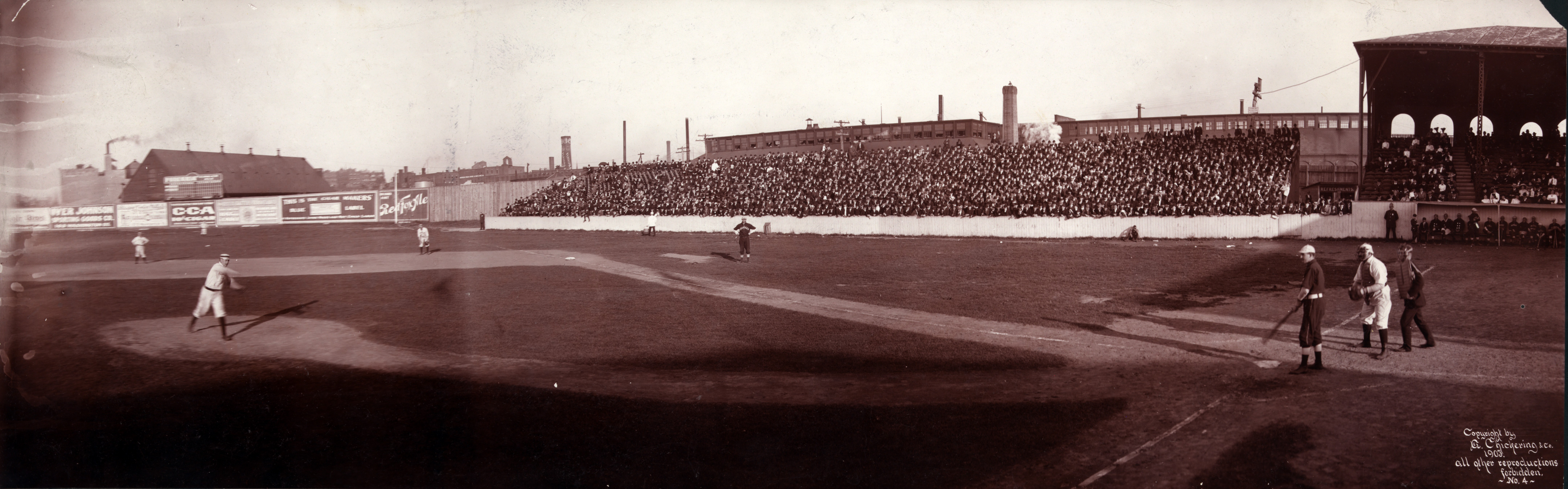
Tom Hughes of the Boston Americans pitches to Nixey Callahan of the Chicago White Stockings in the top of the 5th inning at the Huntington Avenue Grounds, September 22.

== "Battle of Ohio" ==
Termed the "Battle of Ohio", the Cincinnati Reds and Cleveland Naps played an unofficial best of 11-game exhibition series after the regular season, with Cleveland winning the series six games to three.

== Managerial changes ==
=== Off-season ===
Team	Former Manager	New Manager
Baltimore Orioles	Wilbert Robinson	Team folded
Chicago White Stockings	Clark Griffith	Jimmy Callahan
Detroit Tigers	Frank Dwyer	Ed Barrow
New York Highlanders	Team enfranchised	Clark Griffith
Philadelphia Phillies	Bill Shettsline	Chief Zimmer

== League leaders ==
=== American League ===
Hitting leaders
Stat	Player	Total
AVG	Nap Lajoie (CLE)	.344
OPS	Nap Lajoie (CLE)	.896
HR	Buck Freeman (BOS)	13
RBI	Buck Freeman (BOS)	104
R	Patsy Dougherty (BOS)	107
H	Patsy Dougherty (BOS)	195
SB	Harry Bay (CLE)	45

Pitching leaders
Stat	Player	Total
W	Cy Young (BOS)	28
L	Patsy Flaherty (CWS)	25
ERA	Earl Moore (CLE)	1.74
K	Rube Waddell (PHA)	302
IP	Cy Young (BOS)	341.2
SV	Bill Dinneen (BOS); George Mullin (DET); Al Orth (WSH); Jack Powell (SLB); Cy Young (BOS)	2
WHIP	Addie Joss (CLE)	0.948

=== National League ===
Hitting leaders
Stat	Player	Total
AVG	Honus Wagner (PIT)	.355
OPS	Fred Clarke (PIT)	.946
HR	Jimmy Sheckard (BRO)	9
RBI	Sam Mertes (NYG)	104
R	Ginger Beaumont (PIT)	137
H	Ginger Beaumont (PIT)	209
SB	Jimmy Sheckard (BRO); Frank Chance (CHC)	67

Pitching leaders
Stat	Player	Total
W	Joe McGinnity (NYG)	31
L	Togie Pittinger (BSN)	22
ERA	Sam Leever (PIT)	2.06
K	Christy Mathewson (NYG)	267
IP	Joe McGinnity (NYG)	434.0
SV	Carl Lundgren (CHC); Roscoe Miller (NYG)	3
WHIP	Deacon Phillippe (PIT)	1.030

== Milestones ==
=== Batters ===
==== Cycles ====
- Fred Clarke (PIT):
  - Clarke hit for his second cycle and third in franchise history, on May 7 against the Cincinnati Reds.
- Buck Freeman (BOS):
  - Freeman hit for his first cycle and the first cycle in franchise history, on June 21 against the Cleveland Naps.
- Patsy Dougherty (BOS):
  - Dougherty hit for his first cycle and the second cycle in franchise history, on July 29 against the New York Highlanders.
- Bill Bradley (CLE):
  - Bradley hit for his first cycle and the first cycle in franchise history, September 24 against the Washington Senators.

==== Other batting accomplishments ====
- Jack Doyle (BRO):
  - Recorded his 500th career stolen base against the Philadelphia Phillies on July 29. He became the 11th player to reach this mark.
- Patsy Donovan (STL):
  - Recorded his 500th career stolen base against the Brooklyn Superbas in game one of a doubleheader on August 17. He became the 12th player to reach this mark.

=== Pitchers ===
==== No-hitters ====
- Chick Fraser (PHI):
  - Fraser threw his first career no-hitter and the third no-hitter in franchise history, by defeating the Chicago Cubs 10–0 in game two of a doubleheader on September 18. Fraser walked five and struck out four.

==== Other pitching accomplishments ====
- Joe McGinnity (NYG):
  - Became the first pitcher to win two complete games in one day on August 1, with 4–1 and 5–2 victories over the Boston Beaneaters in a doubleheader.

=== Miscellaneous ===
- Chicago White Stockings / Detroit Tigers:
  - Set a major league record for most errors in a game at 18 (twelve committed by Chicago, and six by Detroit).

== Home field attendance ==
Team name	Wins	%±	Home attendance	%±	Per game
New York Giants	84	75.0%	579,530	91.3%	8,279
Philadelphia Athletics	75	−9.6%	422,473	0.6%	6,306
Chicago Cubs	82	20.6%	386,205	46.5%	5,290
St. Louis Browns	65	−16.7%	380,405	39.7%	5,434
Boston Americans	91	18.2%	379,338	8.8%	5,419
Cincinnati Reds	74	5.7%	351,680	61.8%	4,627
Pittsburgh Pirates	91	−11.7%	326,855	34.1%	4,669
Cleveland Naps	77	11.6%	311,280	13.0%	4,206
Chicago White Stockings	60	−18.9%	286,183	−15.3%	4,088
St. Louis Cardinals	43	−23.2%	226,538	0.1%	3,283
Brooklyn Superbas	70	−6.7%	224,670	12.4%	3,078
Detroit Tigers	65	25.0%	224,523	18.5%	3,454
New York Highlanders	72		211,808		3,161
Philadelphia Phillies	49	−12.5%	151,729	35.4%	2,487
Boston Beaneaters	58	−20.5%	143,155	22.4%	2,105
Washington Senators	43	−29.5%	128,878	−31.5%	1,815

== Venues ==
The 1903 season saw the enfranchisement of the New York Highlanders, in place of the folded Baltimore Orioles, playing at Hilltop Park in New York City, New York, where they would play for ten seasons through 1912.

Regarding games that were rescheduled to Sunday, and existing blue laws:

- For 1903 only, the Boston Beaneaters, played one game at Rocky Point State Park in Warwick, Rhode Island on September 6.
- The Cleveland Naps continue playing a few Sunday games at Mahaffey Park in Canton, Ohio (two games on May 10 and June 21) and at Neil Park (one game on May 17). Previously, the Naps played Sunday games at Jail Flats in Fort Wayne, Indiana and Fairview Park in Dayton, Ohio. This would be the last season of separate Sunday games.
- The Detroit Tigers ceased playing at their prior Sunday home game venue, Burns Park in Springwells Township (outside of Detroit city limits), and played at Armory Park in Toledo, Ohio (two games on June 28 and August 16) and Ramona Park in East Grand Rapids, Michigan (one game on May 24).

On August 8, in what is known as the worst disaster in American sports spectating history, Black Saturday, a section of balcony at the Philadelphia Phillies' home at the Baker Bowl collapsed, killing 12 spectators and injuring 232. The Philadelphia Phillies played the last 16 of their 61 home games at the home of the American League crosstown Philadelphia Athletics, Columbia Park from August 20.

== See also ==
- 1903 in baseball (Events, Births, Deaths)
