= 1900 Cincinnati Reds season =

1900 Cincinnati Reds
- League: National League
- Ballpark: League Park
- City: Cincinnati
- Record: 62–77 (.446)
- League place: 7th
- Owners: John T. Brush
- Managers: Bob Allen

The 1900 Cincinnati Reds season was a season in American baseball. The team finished seventh in the National League with a record of 62–77, 21.5 games behind the Brooklyn Superbas.

== Regular season ==
After a disappointing sixth-place finish in 1899, the Reds began to rebuild for the future in 1900. Manager Buck Ewing was replaced after leading the Reds for five seasons, in which the team had a 394–297 record. However, they never finished above third place in the National League during Ewing's tenure. The team named Bob Allen as manager. Allen was a player-manager for the Philadelphia Phillies for their last thirty-five games in 1890, in which the team went 25–10. He last played in the National League in 1897 with the Boston Beaneaters, and played for the Phillies between 1890 and 1894.

During the off-season, the Reds' longtime second baseman, Bid McPhee, retired from playing. McPhee played with the Reds since their inception in 1882, and in his hall of fame career, he batted .272 with 53 home runs and 1072 RBI while scoring 1684 runs with 2258 hits. McPhee led the American Association in home runs in 1886 with eight, and in triples in 1887 with nineteen. To replace McPhee, the Reds moved third baseman Harry Steinfeldt over to second before they acquired Joe Quinn in the early part of the 1900 season.

The team acquired pitchers Ed Scott and Doc Newton from the Indianapolis Hoosiers of the Western League. Neither the 29-year-old Scott nor the 22-year-old Newton had any major league experience.

Offensively, Jake Beckley once again proved to be the leader, as he hit a team high .341 with two home runs and 94 RBI. Jimmy Barrett had a breakout season, batting .316 with five home runs and 42 RBI, while having the team lead in runs with 114 and stolen bases with 44. Sam Crawford, in his first season as a regular, hit .260 with a team high seven home runs and drove in 59 runs.

Scott led the pitching staff with 17 wins, 31 complete games and 315 innings pitched in 42 games. Noodles Hahn finished just behind Scott in wins with 16, while he had a team best 3.20 ERA in 39 games. Hahn led the league with four shutouts, and 132 strikeouts.

=== Season summary ===
The Reds started off the year on a good note, going 6–3 in their first nine games to sit in a first place tie with the Philadelphia Phillies. That would be the high point of the season, as Cincinnati would eventually going into a 3–18 slump to completely fall out of the pennant race and well below the .500 level. Wins would be scarce for the Reds, as they finished the year with a 62–77 record, which placed them in seventh place in the eight team National League, 21.5 games behind the Brooklyn Superbas.

On July 5–6, 1900, the Reds only had one hit each in consecutive games at League Park against the Superbas. Jerry Nops threw the one-hitter on July 5, while Frank Kitson tossed the second one-hitter the next day. The Reds would not endure such a feat until April 25–26, 2013 against the Washington Nationals. On July 12, Hahn threw a no-hitter against the Phillies.

=== Season standings ===
National League
Team	W	L	Pct.	GB	Home	Road
Brooklyn Superbas	82	54	.603	—	43‍–‍26	39‍–‍28
Pittsburgh Pirates	79	60	.568	4½	42‍–‍28	37‍–‍32
Philadelphia Phillies	75	63	.543	8	45‍–‍23	30‍–‍40
Boston Beaneaters	66	72	.478	17	42‍–‍29	24‍–‍43
St. Louis Cardinals	65	75	.464	19	40‍–‍31	25‍–‍44
Chicago Orphans	65	75	.464	19	45‍–‍30	20‍–‍45
Cincinnati Reds	62	77	.446	21½	27‍–‍34	35‍–‍43
New York Giants	60	78	.435	23	38‍–‍31	22‍–‍47

=== Record vs. opponents ===
1900 National League record Sources:
Team	BSN	BRO	CHI	CIN	NYG	PHI	PIT	STL
Boston	—	4–16–2	12–8	13–7	11–7–2	9–11	5–15	12–8
Brooklyn	16–4–2	—	10–10–1	15–4–2	10–10	10–8	8–11–1	13–7
Chicago	8–12	10–10–1	—	9–11–1	12–8–1	9–11–1	8–12	9–11–2
Cincinnati	7–13	4–15–2	11–9–1	—	7–13	9–11–2	12–8	12–8
New York	7–11–2	10–10	8–12–1	13–7	—	7–13	9–11	6–14
Philadelphia	11–9	8–10	11–9–1	11–9–2	13–7	—	9–11	12–18
Pittsburgh	15–5	11–8–1	12–8	8–12	11–9	11–9	—	11–9
St. Louis	8–12	7–13	11–9–2	8–12	14–6	8–12	9–11	—

=== Roster ===
1900 Cincinnati Reds
Roster
Pitchers: Ted Breitenstein; Noodles Hahn; Doc Newton; Bill Phillips; Ed Scott; Archie Stimmel	Catchers: Mike Kahoe; Heinie Peitz; Bob Wood; Infielders: Bob Allen; Jake Beckley; Tommy Corcoran; Charlie Irwin; Joe Quinn; Harry Steinfeldt	Outfielders: Jimmy Barrett; Sam Crawford; Phil Geier; Dick Harley; Topsy Hartsel; Algie McBride; Mike Smith	Manager: Bob Allen

== Player stats ==
=== Batting ===
==== Starters by position ====
Note: Pos = Position; G = Games played; AB = At bats; H = Hits; Avg. = Batting average; HR = Home runs; RBI = Runs batted in

Pos	Player	G	AB	H	Avg.	HR	RBI
C	Heinie Peitz	91	294	75	.255	2	34
1B	Jake Beckley	141	558	190	.341	2	94
2B	Joe Quinn	74	266	73	.274	0	25
SS	Tommy Corcoran	127	523	128	.245	1	54
3B	Harry Steinfeldt	134	510	125	.245	2	66
OF	Sam Crawford	101	389	101	.260	7	59
OF	Algie McBride	112	436	120	.275	4	59
OF	Jimmy Barrett	137	545	172	.316	5	42

==== Other batters ====
Note: G = Games played; AB = At bats; H = Hits; Avg. = Batting average; HR = Home runs; RBI = Runs batted in

Player	G	AB	H	Avg.	HR	RBI
Charlie Irwin	87	333	91	.273	1	44
Mike Kahoe	52	175	33	.189	1	9
Bob Wood	45	139	37	.266	0	22
Phil Geier	30	113	29	.257	0	10
Mike Smith	29	111	31	.279	1	18
Topsy Hartsel	18	64	21	.328	2	5
Dick Harley	5	21	9	.429	0	5
Bob Allen	5	15	2	.133	0	1

=== Pitching ===
==== Starting pitchers ====
Note: G = Games pitched; IP = Innings pitched; W = Wins; L = Losses; ERA = Earned run average; SO = Strikeouts

Player	G	IP	W	L	ERA	SO
Ed Scott	42	315.0	17	20	3.86	87
Noodles Hahn	39	311.1	16	20	3.27	132
Doc Newton	36	235.2	9	15	4.12	89
Bill Phillips	29	207.1	9	11	4.30	50
Ted Breitenstein	24	192.1	10	10	3.65	39

==== Other pitchers ====
Note: G = Games pitched; IP = Innings pitched; W = Wins; L = Losses; ERA = Earned run average; SO = Strikeouts

Player	G	IP	W	L	ERA	SO
Archie Stimmel	2	13.0	1	1	6.92	2
