= 1900 New York Giants season =

1900 New York Giants
- League: National League
- Ballpark: Polo Grounds
- City: New York City
- Record: 60–78 (.435)
- League place: 8th
- Owners: Andrew Freedman
- Managers: Buck Ewing, George Davis

The 1900 New York Giants season was the franchise's 18th season. The team finished in last and eighth place in the National League with a 60–78 record, 23 games behind the Brooklyn Superbas.

== Regular season ==
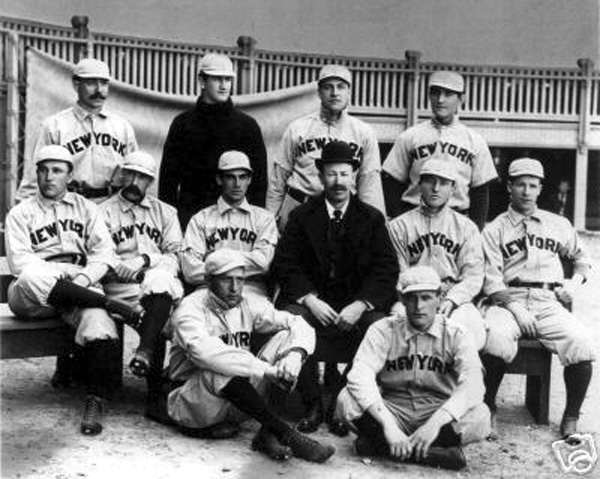
1900 New York Giants

=== Season standings ===
National League
Team	W	L	Pct.	GB	Home	Road
Brooklyn Superbas	82	54	.603	—	43‍–‍26	39‍–‍28
Pittsburgh Pirates	79	60	.568	4½	42‍–‍28	37‍–‍32
Philadelphia Phillies	75	63	.543	8	45‍–‍23	30‍–‍40
Boston Beaneaters	66	72	.478	17	42‍–‍29	24‍–‍43
St. Louis Cardinals	65	75	.464	19	40‍–‍31	25‍–‍44
Chicago Orphans	65	75	.464	19	45‍–‍30	20‍–‍45
Cincinnati Reds	62	77	.446	21½	27‍–‍34	35‍–‍43
New York Giants	60	78	.435	23	38‍–‍31	22‍–‍47

=== Record vs. opponents ===
1900 National League record Sources:
Team	BSN	BRO	CHI	CIN	NYG	PHI	PIT	STL
Boston	—	4–16–2	12–8	13–7	11–7–2	9–11	5–15	12–8
Brooklyn	16–4–2	—	10–10–1	15–4–2	10–10	10–8	8–11–1	13–7
Chicago	8–12	10–10–1	—	9–11–1	12–8–1	9–11–1	8–12	9–11–2
Cincinnati	7–13	4–15–2	11–9–1	—	7–13	9–11–2	12–8	12–8
New York	7–11–2	10–10	8–12–1	13–7	—	7–13	9–11	6–14
Philadelphia	11–9	8–10	11–9–1	11–9–2	13–7	—	9–11	12–18
Pittsburgh	15–5	11–8–1	12–8	8–12	11–9	11–9	—	11–9
St. Louis	8–12	7–13	11–9–2	8–12	14–6	8–12	9–11	—

=== Roster ===
1900 New York Giants
Roster
Pitchers: Bill Carrick; Dick Cogan; Ed Doheny; Pink Hawley; Christy Mathewson; Win Mercer; Cy Seymour; Dummy Taylor	Catchers: Frank Bowerman; Mike Grady; Jack Warner; Infielders: George Davis; Jack Doyle; Kid Gleason; Charlie Hickman; Danny Murphy; Tommy Sheehan	Outfielders: Curt Bernard; Pop Foster; Charlie Frisbee; Kip Selbach; Mike Smith; George Van Haltren	Manager: George Davis; Buck Ewing

== Player stats ==
=== Batting ===
==== Starters by position ====
Note: Pos = Position; G = Games played; AB = At bats; H = Hits; Avg. = Batting average; HR = Home runs; RBI = Runs batted in

Pos	Player	G	AB	H	Avg.	HR	RBI
C	Frank Bowerman	80	270	65	.241	1	42
1B	Jack Doyle	133	505	135	.267	1	66
2B	Kid Gleason	111	420	104	.248	1	29
SS	George Davis	114	426	136	.319	3	61
3B	Charlie Hickman	127	473	148	.313	9	91
OF	Kip Selbach	141	523	176	.337	4	68
OF	George Van Haltren	141	571	180	.315	1	51
OF	Mike Smith	85	312	81	.260	2	34

==== Other batters ====
Note: G = Games played; AB = At bats; H = Hits; Avg. = Batting average; HR = Home runs; RBI = Runs batted in

Player	G	AB	H	Avg.	HR	RBI
Mike Grady	83	251	55	.219	0	27
Jack Warner	34	108	27	.250	0	13
Pop Foster	31	84	22	.262	0	11
Danny Murphy	22	74	20	.270	0	6
Curt Bernard	20	71	18	.254	0	8
Charlie Frisbee	4	13	2	.154	0	3
Dick Cogan	3	8	1	.125	0	0
Tommy Sheehan	1	2	0	.000	0	0

=== Pitching ===
==== Starting pitchers ====
Note: G = Games pitched; IP = Innings pitched; W = Wins; L = Losses; ERA = Earned run average; SO = Strikeouts

Player	G	IP	W	L	ERA	SO
Bill Carrick	45	341.2	19	22	3.53	63
Pink Hawley	41	329.1	18	18	3.53	80
Win Mercer	33	242.2	13	17	3.86	39
Ed Doheny	20	133.2	4	14	5.45	44

==== Other pitchers ====
Note: G = Games pitched; IP = Innings pitched; W = Wins; L = Losses; ERA = Earned run average; SO = Strikeouts

Player	G	IP	W	L	ERA	SO
Luther Taylor	11	62.1	4	3	2.45	16
Cy Seymour	13	53.0	2	1	6.96	19
Christy Mathewson	6	33.2	0	3	5.08	15

==== Relief pitchers ====
Note: G = Games pitched; W = Wins; L = Losses; SV = Saves; ERA = Earned run average; SO = Strikeouts

Player	G	W	L	SV	ERA	SO
Dick Cogan	2	0	0	0	6.75	1
George Van Haltren	1	0	0	0	0.00	0
