= 1900 Pittsburgh Pirates season =

1900 Pittsburgh Pirates
- League: National League
- Ballpark: Exposition Park
- City: Allegheny, Pennsylvania
- Record: 79–60 (.568)
- League place: 2nd
- Owners: Barney Dreyfuss
- Managers: Fred Clarke

The 1900 Pittsburgh (Note: In the early 20th century and earlier, the name of Pittsburgh was spelled with and without the final 'h'.) Pirates season was the 19th season of the Pittsburgh Pirates franchise. The Pirates finished second in the National League with a record of 79–60.

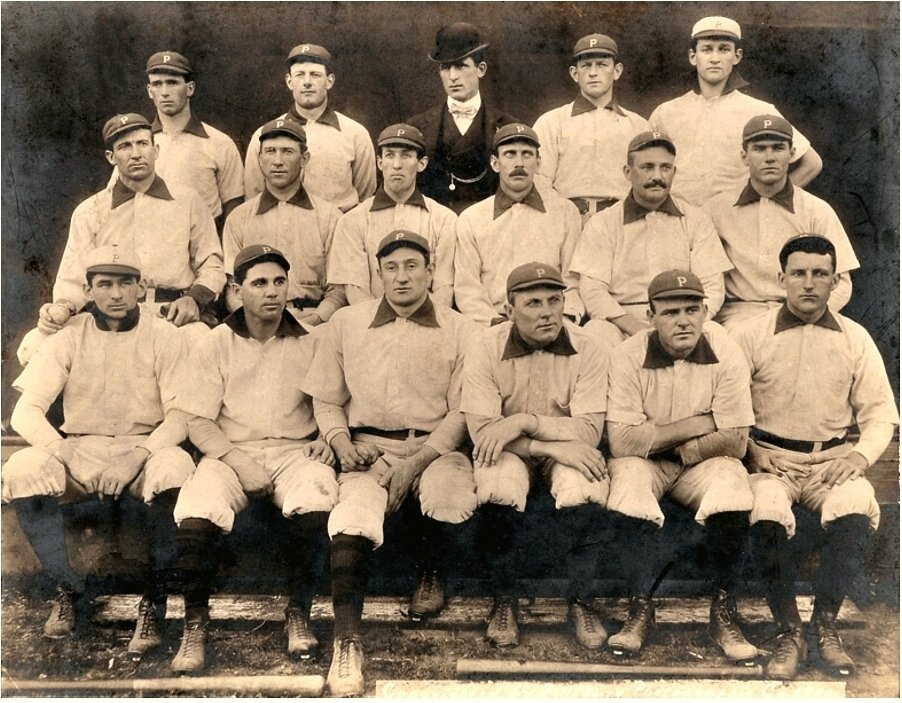
1900 Pittsburgh Pirates team photograph

== Regular season ==
=== Season standings ===
National League
Team	W	L	Pct.	GB	Home	Road
Brooklyn Superbas	82	54	.603	—	43‍–‍26	39‍–‍28
Pittsburgh Pirates	79	60	.568	4½	42‍–‍28	37‍–‍32
Philadelphia Phillies	75	63	.543	8	45‍–‍23	30‍–‍40
Boston Beaneaters	66	72	.478	17	42‍–‍29	24‍–‍43
St. Louis Cardinals	65	75	.464	19	40‍–‍31	25‍–‍44
Chicago Orphans	65	75	.464	19	45‍–‍30	20‍–‍45
Cincinnati Reds	62	77	.446	21½	27‍–‍34	35‍–‍43
New York Giants	60	78	.435	23	38‍–‍31	22‍–‍47

=== Game log ===
1900 Game Log: 79–60 (Home: 42–28; Away: 37–32)
April: 4–6 (Home: 0–3; Away: 4–3)

#	Date	Opponent	Score	Win	Loss	Save	Attendance	Record
1	April 19	@ Cardinals	0–3			—	12,000	0–1
2	April 21	@ Cardinals	4–3			—	—	1–1
3	April 22	@ Cardinals	5–6			—	20,000	1–2
4	April 23	@ Reds	6–0			—	—	2–2
5	April 24	@ Reds	5–3			—	—	3–2
6	April 25	@ Reds	8–9			—	—	3–3
7	April 26	Reds	11–12			—	—	3–4
8	April 27	Reds	5–19			—	—	3–5
9	April 28	Reds	4–7			—	—	3–6
10	April 29	@ Reds	8–6			—	—	4–6

May: 16–10 (Home: 12–7; Away: 4–3)

#	Date	Opponent	Score	Win	Loss	Save	Attendance	Record
11	May 2	Cardinals	6–5			—	—	5–6
12	May 3	Cardinals	2–9			—	—	5–7
13	May 5	Cardinals	5–1			—	—	6–7
14	May 6	@ Orphans	6–7			—	—	6–8
15	May 7	Orphans	6–4			—	—	7–8
16	May 8	Orphans	1–2			—	—	7–9
17	May 10	Orphans	5–4			—	—	8–9
18	May 12	Beaneaters	5–1			—	—	9–9
19	May 13	@ Reds	7–6			—	—	10–9
20	May 14	Beaneaters	6–3			—	—	11–9
21	May 15	Beaneaters	7–5			—	—	12–9
22	May 16	Phillies	8–3			—	—	13–9
23	May 17	Phillies	3–4			—	—	13–10
24	May 18	Phillies	11–4			—	—	14–10
25	May 20	@ Orphans	3–6			—	—	14–11
26	May 21	Superbas	5–7			—	—	14–12
27	May 22	Superbas	1–4			—	—	14–13
28	May 23	Superbas	8–5			—	—	15–13
29	May 24	Superbas	5–4			—	—	16–13
30	May 25	Giants	3–4			—	—	16–14
31	May 26	Giants	6–13			—	—	16–15
32	May 27	@ Reds	10–2			—	—	17–15
33	May 28	Giants	14–0			—	—	18–15
34	May 30	@ Giants	7–6			—	3,000	19–15
35	May 30	@ Giants	1–9			—	15,000	19–16
36	May 31	@ Giants	6–4			—	—	20–16

June: 9–12 (Home: 4–2; Away: 5–10)

#	Date	Opponent	Score	Win	Loss	Save	Attendance	Record
37	June 1	@ Giants	4–6			—	—	20–17
38	June 2	@ Phillies	2–8			—	—	20–18
39	June 4	@ Phillies	5–4			—	—	21–18
40	June 5	@ Phillies	5–6			—	—	21–19
41	June 6	@ Phillies	6–3			—	—	22–19
42	June 7	@ Superbas	7–4			—	—	23–19
43	June 9	@ Superbas	3–9			—	—	23–20
44	June 11	@ Superbas	7–8			—	—	23–21
45	June 12	@ Beaneaters	1–3			—	—	23–22
46	June 13	@ Beaneaters	0–1			—	—	23–23
47	June 14	@ Beaneaters	3–7			—	—	23–24
48	June 16	Orphans	5–8			—	—	23–25
49	June 17	@ Orphans	1–8			—	—	23–26
50	June 18	@ Orphans	4–1			—	—	24–26
51	June 19	@ Orphans	0–1			—	—	24–27
52	June 20	@ Orphans	8–1			—	—	25–27
53	June 26	Orphans	8–6			—	—	26–27
54	June 27	Orphans	9–2			—	—	27–27
55	June 28	Phillies	3–0			—	—	28–27
56	June 29	Phillies	2–4			—	—	28–28
57	June 30	Phillies	5–3			—	—	29–28

July: 14–10 (Home: 8–3; Away: 6–7)

#	Date	Opponent	Score	Win	Loss	Save	Attendance	Record
58	July 1	@ Reds	6–0			—	—	30–28
59	July 2	Beaneaters	2–1			—	—	31–28
60	July 3	Beaneaters	2–1			—	—	32–28
61	July 4	Beaneaters	8–6			—	—	33–28
62	July 4	Beaneaters	3–1			—	10,500	34–28
63	July 5	Giants	3–7			—	—	34–29
64	July 7	Giants	4–3			—	—	35–29
65	July 8	@ Cardinals	3–17			—	—	35–30
66	July 10	Superbas	2–4			—	—	35–31
67	July 11	Superbas	4–0			—	—	36–31
68	July 12	Superbas	7–6			—	—	37–31
69	July 13	Phillies	8–23			—	—	37–32
70	July 14	@ Orphans	6–1			—	—	38–32
71	July 15	@ Orphans	3–5			—	—	38–33
72	July 16	@ Orphans	7–3			—	—	39–33
73	July 17	Orphans	2–0			—	—	40–33
74	July 19	@ Phillies	3–4			—	—	40–34
75	July 20	@ Phillies	4–7			—	—	40–35
76	July 21	@ Phillies	0–3			—	—	40–36
77	July 24	@ Giants	1–2			—	—	40–37
78	July 25	@ Giants	11–3			—	—	41–37
79	July 27	@ Beaneaters	2–3			—	—	41–38
80	July 28	@ Beaneaters	9–2			—	—	42–38
81	July 31	@ Superbas	17–1			—	—	43–38

August: 13–10 (Home: 12–7; Away: 1–3)

#	Date	Opponent	Score	Win	Loss	Save	Attendance	Record
82	August 1	@ Superbas	6–10			—	—	43–39
83	August 4	Phillies	4–3			—	—	44–39
84	August 5	@ Reds	1–3			—	—	44–40
85	August 6	Phillies	7–3			—	—	45–40
86	August 7	Phillies	9–0			—	—	46–40
87	August 8	Beaneaters	6–3			—	—	47–40
88	August 9	Beaneaters	2–3			—	—	47–41
89	August 11	Beaneaters	5–1			—	—	48–41
90	August 12	@ Orphans	6–2			—	—	49–41
91	August 13	Giants	4–7			—	—	49–42
92	August 14	Giants	5–0			—	—	50–42
93	August 14	Giants	7–1			—	4,600	51–42
94	August 15	Giants	6–2			—	—	52–42
95	August 16	Superbas	0–8			—	—	52–43
96	August 17	Superbas	5–3			—	—	53–43
97	August 18	Superbas	8–4			—	—	54–43
98	August 20	Giants	2–4			—	—	54–44
99	August 23	Reds	2–3			—	—	54–45
100	August 24	Reds	2–11			—	—	54–46
101	August 25	Reds	6–5			—	—	55–46
102	August 26	@ Reds	0–1			—	—	55–47
103	August 30	Cardinals	11–3			—	—	56–47
104	August 31	Cardinals	5–10			—	—	56–48

September: 18–9 (Home: 4–4; Away: 14–5)

#	Date	Opponent	Score	Win	Loss	Save	Attendance	Record
105	September 1	Cardinals	2–1			—	—	57–48
106	September 3	@ Beaneaters	8–7			—	2,500	58–48
107	September 3	@ Beaneaters	14–1			—	5,000	59–48
108	September 4	@ Beaneaters	9–0			—	—	60–48
109	September 4	@ Beaneaters	6–5			—	2,500	61–48
110	September 5	@ Beaneaters	5–2			—	—	62–48
111	September 6	@ Superbas	9–2			—	—	63–48
112	September 7	@ Superbas	6–6			—	—	63–48
113	September 8	@ Superbas	15–7			—	—	64–48
114	September 8	@ Superbas	5–6			—	—	64–49
115	September 10	@ Superbas	6–5			—	—	65–49
116	September 11	@ Phillies	2–0			—	—	66–49
117	September 12	@ Phillies	10–9			—	3,000	67–49
118	September 13	@ Phillies	6–11			—	—	67–50
119	September 15	@ Giants	1–2			—	—	67–51
120	September 17	@ Giants	12–3			—	—	68–51
121	September 18	@ Giants	9–4			—	—	69–51
122	September 19	@ Giants	5–2			—	—	70–51
123	September 20	Cardinals	10–4			—	—	71–51
124	September 21	Cardinals	7–3			—	—	72–51
125	September 22	Cardinals	6–7			—	—	72–52
126	September 23	@ Cardinals	3–1			—	—	73–52
127	September 24	@ Cardinals	0–1			—	—	73–53
128	September 26	Reds	4–6			—	—	73–54
129	September 27	Reds	1–4			—	—	73–55
130	September 28	Reds	8–1			—	—	74–55
131	September 29	Reds	1–2			—	—	74–56
132	September 30	@ Reds	3–4			—	—	74–57

October: 5–3 (Home: 2–2; Away: 3–1)

#	Date	Opponent	Score	Win	Loss	Save	Attendance	Record
133	October 6	Cardinals	3–4			—	—	74–58
134	October 7	@ Cardinals	3–2			—	—	75–58
135	October 8	@ Cardinals	8–0			—	—	76–58
136	October 8	@ Cardinals	8–2			—	1,300	77–58
137	October 9	@ Cardinals	4–8			—	—	77–59
138	October 11	Orphans	2–1			—	—	78–59
139	October 12	Orphans	10–6			—	—	79–59
140	October 13	Orphans	5–7			—	—	79–60

Legend: = Win = Loss = Tie
Bold = Pittsburgh Pirates team member

=== Record vs. opponents ===
1900 National League record Sources:
Team	BSN	BRO	CHI	CIN	NYG	PHI	PIT	STL
Boston	—	4–16–2	12–8	13–7	11–7–2	9–11	5–15	12–8
Brooklyn	16–4–2	—	10–10–1	15–4–2	10–10	10–8	8–11–1	13–7
Chicago	8–12	10–10–1	—	9–11–1	12–8–1	9–11–1	8–12	9–11–2
Cincinnati	7–13	4–15–2	11–9–1	—	7–13	9–11–2	12–8	12–8
New York	7–11–2	10–10	8–12–1	13–7	—	7–13	9–11	6–14
Philadelphia	11–9	8–10	11–9–1	11–9–2	13–7	—	9–11	12–18
Pittsburgh	15–5	11–8–1	12–8	8–12	11–9	11–9	—	11–9
St. Louis	8–12	7–13	11–9–2	8–12	14–6	8–12	9–11	—

=== Detailed records ===
National League
Opponent	W	L	WP	RS	RA
Boston Beaneaters	15	5	0.750	103	56
Brooklyn Superbas	11	8	0.579	126	103
Chicago Orphans	12	8	0.600	97	75
Cincinnati Reds	8	12	0.400	98	104
New York Giants	11	9	0.550	111	82
Philadelphia Phillies	11	9	0.550	103	102
**Pittsburgh Pirates**					
St. Louis Cardinals	11	9	0.550	95	90
Total	79	60	0.568	733	612
Season Total	79	60	0.568	733	612

Month	Games	Won	Lost	Win %	RS	RA
April	10	4	6	0.400	56	68
May	26	16	10	0.615	147	122
June	21	9	12	0.429	88	93
July	24	14	10	0.583	117	103
August	23	13	10	0.565	109	90
September	27	18	9	0.667	173	106
October	8	5	3	0.625	43	30
Total	139	79	60	0.568	733	612

	Games	Won	Lost	Win %	RS	RA
Home	70	42	28	0.600	359	315
Away	69	37	32	0.536	368	291
Total	139	79	60	0.568	733	612

=== Notable transactions ===
- May 22, 1900: Jack O'Connor was purchased by the Pirates from the St. Louis Cardinals for $2,000.

=== Roster ===
1900 Pittsburgh Pirates
**Roster**
**Pitchers**: Jack Chesbro; Patsy Flaherty; Bert Husting; Sam Leever; Jouett Meekin; Deacon Phillippe; Jesse Tannehill; Rube Waddell; Walt Woods	**Catchers**: Jiggs Donahue; Tacks Latimer; Jack O'Connor; Pop Schriver; Chief Zimmer; **Infielders**: Duff Cooley; Pop Dillon; Bones Ely; Tommy Leach; Tom O'Brien; Claude Ritchey; Jimmy Williams	**Outfielders**: Ginger Beaumont; Fred Clarke; Tom McCreery; Ed Poole; Honus Wagner	**Manager**: Fred Clarke

== Player stats ==
=== Batting ===
==== Starters by position ====
Note: Pos = Position; G = Games played; AB = At bats; H = Hits; Avg. = Batting average; HR = Home runs; RBI = Runs batted in

Pos	Player	G	AB	H	Avg.	HR	RBI
C	Chief Zimmer	82	271	80	.295	0	35
1B	Tom O'Brien	102	376	109	.290	3	61
2B	Claude Ritchey	123	476	139	.292	1	67
SS	Bones Ely	130	475	116	.244	0	51
3B	Jimmy Williams	106	416	110	.264	5	68
OF	Ginger Beaumont	138	567	158	.279	5	50
OF	Honus Wagner	135	527	201	.381	4	100
OF	Fred Clarke	106	399	110	.276	3	32

==== Other batters ====
Note: G = Games played; AB = At bats; H = Hits; Avg. = Batting average; HR = Home runs; RBI = Runs batted in

Pos	Player	G	AB	H	Avg.	HR	RBI
1B	Duff Cooley	66	249	50	.201	0	22
3B	Tommy Leach	51	160	34	.213	1	16
C	Jack O'Connor	43	147	35	.238	0	19
OF	Tom McCreery	43	132	29	.220	1	13
C	Pop Schriver	37	92	27	.293	1	12
1B	Pop Dillon	5	18	2	.111	0	1
C	Tacks Latimer	4	12	4	.333	0	2
UT	Jiggs Donahue	3	10	2	.200	0	3
OF	Ed Poole	2	4	2	.500	1	3

=== Pitching ===
==== Starting pitchers ====
Note: G = Games pitched; IP = Innings pitched; W = Wins; L = Losses; ERA = Earned run average; SO = Strikeouts

Player	G	IP	W	L	ERA	SO
Deacon Phillippe	38	279.0	20	13	2.84	75
Jesse Tannehill	29	234.0	20	6	2.88	50
Sam Leever	30	232.2	15	13	2.71	84
Jack Chesbro	32	215.2	15	13	3.67	56
Rube Waddell	29	208.2	8	13	2.37	130
Jouett Meekin	2	13.0	0	2	6.92	3

==== Other pitchers ====
Note: G = Games pitched; IP = Innings pitched; W = Wins; L = Losses; ERA = Earned run average; SO = Strikeouts

Player	G	IP	W	L	ERA	SO
Patsy Flaherty	4	22.0	0	0	6.14	5

==== Relief pitchers ====
Note: G = Games pitched; W = Wins; L = Losses; SV = Saves; ERA = Earned run average; SO = Strikeouts

Player	G	W	L	SV	ERA	SO
Bert Husting	2	0	0	0	5.63	7
Ed Poole	1	1	0	0	1.29	3
Walt Woods	1	0	0	0	21.00	1
Honus Wagner	1	0	0	0	0.00	0
Tom McCreery	1	0	0	0	12.00	0

== Postseason ==
=== 1900 Chronicle Telegraph Cup ===
The Chronicle Telegraph Cup was held just once, in 1900, and was sponsored by the Pittsburgh Chronicle Telegraph, a newspaper in the hometown of the National League's second-place finisher, the Pirates. It pitted the Pirates against the first-place Brooklyn Superbas in a best-of-five postseason series. The Superbas won the series, 3 games to 1.
