= 1900 Philadelphia Phillies season =

National League season

1900 Philadelphia Phillies
- League: National League
- Ballpark: National League Park
- City: Philadelphia, Pennsylvania
- Record: 75–63 (.543)
- League place: 3rd
- Owners: Al Reach, John Rogers
- Managers: Bill Shettsline

The 1900 Philadelphia Phillies season was the 18th season for the National League franchise. The Phillies finished the season in third place in the National League with a record of 75–63.

Bill Shettsline managed the Phillies, which played its home games at National League Park. The Phillies' lineup featured three future Hall of Famers in Ed Delahanty, Nap Lajoie, and Elmer Flick.

The team finished second in hitting (.290) and first in attendance with 4,313 fans per game.

== Regular season ==
=== Sign Stealing and Discovery ===
On September 17, 1900, at home in game 1 of a doubleheader against the Cincinnati Reds, members of the Phillies were discovered to have been stealing opponents' signs using hidden wires and an electronic device.

Phillies’ backup catcher Morgan Murphy sat in center field by the team’s centfielder lockers and offices at the Phillies' ball park. The Phillies ran wires under the field from the seat to a battery-powered device buried in the dirt beneath the third-base coach’s box. Murphy spotted the opposing catcher’s signals to the pitcher and signaled once for a fastball and twice for a breaking ball. Phillies infielder Pearce Chiles coached third-base, received the signal beneath his feet, and then signaled to the batter.

During the third inning, Cincinnati’s Tommy Corcoran walked to the third-base coach’s box and began digging at the dirt with his cleats. Before the Phillies' groundskeeper could stop him, Corcoran had unearthed the electronic box and showed it to umpire Tim Hurst. Hurst disciplined no one, signaled the game to continue, and is reported to have shouted, “Back to the mines, men!”.

=== Season standings ===
National League
Team	W	L	Pct.	GB	Home	Road
Brooklyn Superbas	82	54	.603	—	43‍–‍26	39‍–‍28
Pittsburgh Pirates	79	60	.568	4½	42‍–‍28	37‍–‍32
Philadelphia Phillies	75	63	.543	8	45‍–‍23	30‍–‍40
Boston Beaneaters	66	72	.478	17	42‍–‍29	24‍–‍43
St. Louis Cardinals	65	75	.464	19	40‍–‍31	25‍–‍44
Chicago Orphans	65	75	.464	19	45‍–‍30	20‍–‍45
Cincinnati Reds	62	77	.446	21½	27‍–‍34	35‍–‍43
New York Giants	60	78	.435	23	38‍–‍31	22‍–‍47

=== Record vs. opponents ===
1900 National League record Sources:
Team	BSN	BRO	CHI	CIN	NYG	PHI	PIT	STL
Boston	—	4–16–2	12–8	13–7	11–7–2	9–11	5–15	12–8
Brooklyn	16–4–2	—	10–10–1	15–4–2	10–10	10–8	8–11–1	13–7
Chicago	8–12	10–10–1	—	9–11–1	12–8–1	9–11–1	8–12	9–11–2
Cincinnati	7–13	4–15–2	11–9–1	—	7–13	9–11–2	12–8	12–8
New York	7–11–2	10–10	8–12–1	13–7	—	7–13	9–11	6–14
Philadelphia	11–9	8–10	11–9–1	11–9–2	13–7	—	9–11	12–18
Pittsburgh	15–5	11–8–1	12–8	8–12	11–9	11–9	—	11–9
St. Louis	8–12	7–13	11–9–2	8–12	14–6	8–12	9–11	—

=== Roster ===
1900 Philadelphia Phillies
Roster
Pitchers: Bill Bernhard; Bert Conn; Red Donahue; Jack Dunn; Chick Fraser; Al Maul; Warren McLaughlin; Al Orth; Wiley Piatt	Catchers: Klondike Douglass; Fred Jacklitsch; Ed McFarland; Morgan Murphy; Infielders: Pearce Chiles; Monte Cross; Ed Delahanty; Joe Dolan; Nap Lajoie; Bert Myers; Harry Wolverton; Charlie Ziegler	Outfielders: Elmer Flick; Jimmy Slagle; Roy Thomas	Manager: Bill Shettsline

== Player stats ==
=== Batting ===
==== Starters by position ====
Note: Pos = Position; G = Games played; AB = At bats; H = Hits; Avg. = Batting average; HR = Home runs; RBI = Runs batted in

Pos	Player	G	AB	H	Avg.	HR	RBI
C	Ed McFarland	94	344	105	.305	0	38
1B	Ed Delahanty	131	539	174	.323	2	109
2B	Nap Lajoie	102	451	152	.337	7	92
SS	Monte Cross	131	466	94	.202	3	62
3B	Harry Wolverton	101	383	108	.282	3	58
OF	Roy Thomas	140	531	168	.316	0	33
OF	Elmer Flick	138	545	200	.367	11	110
OF	Jimmy Slagle	141	574	165	.287	0	45

==== Other batters ====
Note: G = Games played; AB = At bats; H = Hits; Avg. = Batting average; HR = Home runs; RBI = Runs batted in

Player	G	AB	H	Avg.	HR	RBI
Joe Dolan	74	257	51	.198	1	27
Klondike Douglass	50	160	48	.300	0	25
Pearce Chiles	33	111	24	.216	1	23
Morgan Murphy	11	36	10	.278	0	3
Bert Myers	7	28	5	.179	0	2
Charlie Ziegler	3	11	3	.273	0	1
Fred Jacklitsch	5	11	2	.182	0	3

=== Pitching ===
==== Starting pitchers ====
Note: G = Games pitched; IP = Innings pitched; W = Wins; L = Losses; ERA = Earned run average; SO = Strikeouts

Player	G	IP	W	L	ERA	SO
Al Orth	33	262.0	14	14	3.78	68
Red Donahue	32	240.0	15	10	3.60	41
Chick Fraser	29	223.1	15	9	3.14	58
Bill Bernhard	32	218.2	15	10	4.77	49
Wiley Piatt	22	160.2	9	10	4.65	47
Jack Dunn	10	80.0	5	5	4.84	12
Al Maul	5	38.0	2	3	6.16	6

==== Other pitchers ====
Note: G = Games pitched; IP = Innings pitched; W = Wins; L = Losses; ERA = Earned run average; SO = Strikeouts

Player	G	IP	W	L	ERA	SO
Bert Conn	4	17.1	0	2	8.31	2

==== Relief pitchers ====
Note: G = Games pitched; W = Wins; L = Losses; SV = Saves; ERA = Earned run average; SO = Strikeouts

Player	G	W	L	SV	ERA	SO
Warren McLaughlin	1	0	0	0	4.50	1
Roy Thomas	1	0	0	0	3.38	0
