= 1900 St. Louis Cardinals season =

Major League Baseball season

1900 St. Louis Cardinals
- League: National League
- Ballpark: League Park
- City: St. Louis, Missouri
- Record: 65–75 (.464)
- League place: 5th
- Owners: Frank Robison and Stanley Robison
- Managers: Patsy Tebeau (42–50); Louie Heilbroner (23–25)

The 1900 St. Louis Cardinals season was the team's 19th season in St. Louis, Missouri and the ninth season in the National League. The Cardinals went 65–75 during the season and finished fifth in the National League.

== Regular season ==
=== Season standings ===
National League
Team	W	L	Pct.	GB	Home	Road
Brooklyn Superbas	82	54	.603	—	43‍–‍26	39‍–‍28
Pittsburgh Pirates	79	60	.568	4½	42‍–‍28	37‍–‍32
Philadelphia Phillies	75	63	.543	8	45‍–‍23	30‍–‍40
Boston Beaneaters	66	72	.478	17	42‍–‍29	24‍–‍43
St. Louis Cardinals	65	75	.464	19	40‍–‍31	25‍–‍44
Chicago Orphans	65	75	.464	19	45‍–‍30	20‍–‍45
Cincinnati Reds	62	77	.446	21½	27‍–‍34	35‍–‍43
New York Giants	60	78	.435	23	38‍–‍31	22‍–‍47

=== Record vs. opponents ===
1900 National League record Sources:
Team	BSN	BRO	CHI	CIN	NYG	PHI	PIT	STL
Boston	—	4–16–2	12–8	13–7	11–7–2	9–11	5–15	12–8
Brooklyn	16–4–2	—	10–10–1	15–4–2	10–10	10–8	8–11–1	13–7
Chicago	8–12	10–10–1	—	9–11–1	12–8–1	9–11–1	8–12	9–11–2
Cincinnati	7–13	4–15–2	11–9–1	—	7–13	9–11–2	12–8	12–8
New York	7–11–2	10–10	8–12–1	13–7	—	7–13	9–11	6–14
Philadelphia	11–9	8–10	11–9–1	11–9–2	13–7	—	9–11	12–18
Pittsburgh	15–5	11–8–1	12–8	8–12	11–9	11–9	—	11–9
St. Louis	8–12	7–13	11–9–2	8–12	14–6	8–12	9–11	—

=== Notable transactions ===
- May 22, 1900: Jack O'Connor was purchased from the Cardinals by the Pittsburgh Pirates for $2,000.

=== Roster ===
1900 St. Louis Cardinals
Roster
Pitchers: Jack Harper; Jim Hughey; Cowboy Jones; Jack Powell; Willie Sudhoff; Tom Thomas; Gus Weyhing; Cy Young	Catchers: Fritz Buelow; Lou Criger; Jack O'Connor; Wilbert Robinson; Henry Stein; Infielders: Lave Cross; Bill Keister; Otto Krueger; Dan McGann; John McGraw; Joe Quinn; Patsy Tebeau; Bobby Wallace	Outfielders: Jesse Burkett; Pat Dillard; Mike Donlin; Patsy Donovan; Emmet Heidrick	Manager: Patsy Tebeau; Louie Heilbroner

== Player stats ==
=== Batting ===
==== Starters by position ====
Note: Pos = Position; G = Games played; AB = At bats; H = Hits; Avg. = Batting average; HR = Home runs; RBI = Runs batted in

Pos	Player	G	AB	H	Avg.	HR	RBI
C	Lou Criger	80	288	78	.271	2	38
1B	Dan McGann	121	444	132	.297	4	58
2B	Bill Keister	126	497	149	.300	1	72
SS	Bobby Wallace	126	485	130	.268	4	70
3B	John McGraw	99	334	115	.344	2	33
OF	Jesse Burkett	141	559	203	.363	7	68
OF	Emmet Heidrick	85	339	102	.301	2	45
OF	Patsy Donovan	126	503	159	.316	0	61

==== Other batters ====
Note: G = Games played; AB = At bats; H = Hits; Avg. = Batting average; HR = Home runs; RBI = Runs batted in

Player	G	AB	H	Avg.	HR	RBI
Mike Donlin	78	276	90	.326	10	48
Wilbert Robinson	60	224	52	.248	0	28
Pat Dillard	57	183	42	.230	0	12
Willie Sudhoff	35	106	20	.189	0	6
Joe Quinn	22	80	21	.263	1	11
Lave Cross	16	61	18	.295	0	6
Otto Krueger	12	35	14	.400	1	3
Jack O'Connor	10	32	7	.219	0	6
Fritz Buelow	6	17	4	.235	0	3
Patsy Tebeau	1	4	0	.000	0	0
Henry Stein	1	0	0	----	0	0

=== Pitching ===
==== Starting pitchers ====
Note: G = Games pitched; IP = Innings pitched; W = Wins; L = Losses; ERA = Earned run average; SO = Strikeouts

Player	G	IP	W	L	ERA	SO
Cy Young	41	321.1	19	19	3.00	115
Cowboy Jones	39	292.2	13	19	3.57	68
Jack Powell	38	287.2	17	16	4.44	77
Willie Sudhoff	16	127.0	6	8	2.76	29
Jim Hughey	20	112.2	5	7	5.19	23

==== Other pitchers ====
Note: G = Games pitched; IP = Innings pitched; W = Wins; L = Losses; ERA = Earned run average; SO = Strikeouts

Player	G	IP	W	L	ERA	SO
Gus Weyhing	7	46.2	3	2	4.63	6
Tom Thomas	5	26.1	2	2	3.76	7
Jack Harper	1	3.0	0	1	12.00	0
