= 1900 Chicago Orphans season =

1900 Chicago Orphans
- League: National League
- Ballpark: West Side Park
- City: Chicago
- Record: 65–75 (.464)
- League place: 6th
- Owners: Albert Spalding
- Managers: Tom Loftus

The 1900 Chicago Orphans season was the 29th season of the Chicago Orphans franchise, the 25th in the National League and the eighth at West Side Park. The Orphans tied with the St. Louis Cardinals for fifth in the National League with a record of 65–75.

== Regular season ==
=== Season standings ===
National League
Team	W	L	Pct.	GB	Home	Road
Brooklyn Superbas	82	54	.603	—	43‍–‍26	39‍–‍28
Pittsburgh Pirates	79	60	.568	4½	42‍–‍28	37‍–‍32
Philadelphia Phillies	75	63	.543	8	45‍–‍23	30‍–‍40
Boston Beaneaters	66	72	.478	17	42‍–‍29	24‍–‍43
St. Louis Cardinals	65	75	.464	19	40‍–‍31	25‍–‍44
Chicago Orphans	65	75	.464	19	45‍–‍30	20‍–‍45
Cincinnati Reds	62	77	.446	21½	27‍–‍34	35‍–‍43
New York Giants	60	78	.435	23	38‍–‍31	22‍–‍47

=== Record vs. opponents ===
1900 National League record Sources:
Team	BSN	BRO	CHI	CIN	NYG	PHI	PIT	STL
Boston	—	4–16–2	12–8	13–7	11–7–2	9–11	5–15	12–8
Brooklyn	16–4–2	—	10–10–1	15–4–2	10–10	10–8	8–11–1	13–7
Chicago	8–12	10–10–1	—	9–11–1	12–8–1	9–11–1	8–12	9–11–2
Cincinnati	7–13	4–15–2	11–9–1	—	7–13	9–11–2	12–8	12–8
New York	7–11–2	10–10	8–12–1	13–7	—	7–13	9–11	6–14
Philadelphia	11–9	8–10	11–9–1	11–9–2	13–7	—	9–11	12–18
Pittsburgh	15–5	11–8–1	12–8	8–12	11–9	11–9	—	11–9
St. Louis	8–12	7–13	11–9–2	8–12	14–6	8–12	9–11	—

== Roster ==
1900 Chicago Orphans
Roster
Pitchers: Nixey Callahan; Bert Cunningham; Mal Eason; Ned Garvin; Clark Griffith; Zaza Harvey; Tom Hughes; Frank Killen; Jock Menefee; Jack Taylor	Catchers: Roger Bresnahan; Frank Chance; Charlie Dexter; Tim Donahue; Johnny Kling; Art Nichols; Infielders: Bill Bradley; Cupid Childs; Billy Clingman; Bill Everitt; John Ganzel; Barry McCormick; Sammy Strang; Harry Wolverton	Outfielders: Cozy Dolan; Sam Dungan; Danny Green; Jack McCarthy; Sam Mertes; Jimmy Ryan	Manager: Tom Loftus

== Player stats ==
=== Batting ===
==== Starters by position ====
Note: Pos = Position; G = Games played; AB = At bats; H = Hits; Avg. = Batting average; HR = Home runs; RBI = Runs batted in

Pos	Player	G	AB	H	Avg.	HR	RBI
C	Tim Donahue	67	216	51	.236	0	17
1B	John Ganzel	78	284	78	.275	4	32
2B	Cupid Childs	137	531	128	.241	0	44
SS	Barry McCormick	110	379	83	.219	3	48
3B	Bill Bradley	122	444	125	.282	5	49
OF	Jack McCarthy	124	503	148	.294	0	48
OF	Jimmy Ryan	105	415	115	.277	5	59
OF	Danny Green	103	389	116	.298	5	49

==== Other batters ====
Note: G = Games played; AB = At bats; H = Hits; Avg. = Batting average; HR = Home runs; RBI = Runs batted in

Player	G	AB	H	Avg.	HR	RBI
Sam Mertes	127	481	142	.295	7	60
Billy Clingman	47	159	33	.208	0	11
Frank Chance	56	149	44	.295	0	13
Charlie Dexter	40	125	25	.200	2	20
Sammy Strang	27	102	29	.284	0	9
Bill Everitt	23	91	24	.264	0	17
Johnny Kling	15	51	15	.294	0	7
Cozy Dolan	13	48	13	.271	0	2
Art Nichols	8	25	5	.200	0	0
Sam Dungan	6	15	4	.267	0	1
Harry Wolverton	3	11	2	.182	0	0
Roger Bresnahan	2	2	0	.000	0	0

=== Pitching ===
==== Starting pitchers ====
Note: G = Games pitched; IP = Innings pitched; W = Wins; L = Losses; ERA = Earned run average; SO = Strikeouts

Player	G	IP	W	L	ERA	SO
Nixey Callahan	32	285.1	13	16	3.82	77
Clark Griffith	30	248.0	14	13	3.05	61
Ned Garvin	30	246.1	10	18	2.41	107
Jack Taylor	28	222.1	10	17	2.55	57
Jock Menefee	16	117.0	9	4	3.85	30
Bert Cunningham	8	64.0	4	3	4.36	7
Frank Killen	6	54.0	3	3	4.67	4
Tom Hughes	3	21.0	1	1	5.14	12
Mal Eason	1	9.0	1	0	1.00	2

==== Relief pitchers ====
Note: G = Games pitched; W = Wins; L = Losses; SV = Saves; ERA = Earned run average; SO = Strikeouts

Player	G	W	L	SV	ERA	SO
Zaza Harvey	1	0	0	0	0.00	0
