= Thomas McCreery =

Thomas McCreery may refer to:

- Thomas C. McCreery (1816–1890), U.S. senator from Kentucky
- Tom McCreery (1874–1941), American baseball player
