= 1900 Major League Baseball season =

1900 MLB season
- League: National League (NL)
- Sport: Baseball
- Duration: Regular season: April 19 – October 14, 1900; Chronicle-Telegraph Cup: October 15–18, 1900
- Games: 140
- Teams: 8

Pennant winner
- NL champions: Brooklyn Superbas
- NL runners-up: Pittsburgh Pirates

Chronicle-Telegraph Cup
- Venue: Exposition Park, Allegheny, Pennsylvania
- Champions: Brooklyn Superbas
- Runners-up: Pittsburgh Pirates

MLB seasons
- ← 1899 1901 →

Locations of teams for the 1900–1901 National League seasons
National League

The 1900 major league baseball season began on April 19, 1900. The regular season ended on October 14, with the Brooklyn Superbas as the regular season champion of the National League. The Superbas and runner-up Pittsburgh Pirates competed in the Chronicle-Telegraph Cup, a precursor to the current World Series, over four days, with Game 1 on October 15 and ended with Game 4 on October 18. The Superbas defeated the Pirates in the best-of-five series in four games.

The 1900 season saw the return of a postseason championship series (albeit as a one-off), the Chronicle-Telegraph Cup, following the end of the Temple Cup in 1897.

The 1900 season saw the aftermath of the National League contracting from 12 to 8 teams, eliminating the Baltimore Orioles, Cleveland Spiders, Louisville Colonels, and Washington Senators. The elimination of major-league baseball from these cities prompted the minor league American League to declare themselves as a major league the following year.

The St. Louis Perfectos were renamed the St. Louis Cardinals.

== Schedule ==
The 1900 schedule consisted of 140 games for the eight teams of the National League. Each team was scheduled to play 20 games against the other seven teams in the league. This format had previously been used by the National League during their 1888–1891 seasons. This format would last until 1904, which saw an increase of games played.

Opening Day took place on April 19 featuring all eight teams. The final day of the season on October 14. The Chronicle-Telegraph Cup, a precursor to the current World Series, took place between October 15 and October 18.

== Rule change ==
The 1900 season saw the following rule change:

- Home plate is changed from a square to a five-sided figure, as developed by Robert M. Keating.
- The balk rule was modified so that a batter was no longer rewarded first base. Runners already on base will move up.

== Teams ==
League	Team	City	Ballpark	Capacity	Manager
National League	Boston Beaneaters	Boston, Massachusetts	South End Grounds	6,600	Frank Selee
National League	Brooklyn Superbas	New York, New York	Washington Park	12,000	Ned Hanlon
National League	Chicago Orphans	Chicago, Illinois	West Side Park	13,000	Tom Loftus
National League	Cincinnati Reds	Cincinnati, Ohio	League Park (Cincinnati)	9,000	Bob Allen
National League	New York Giants	New York, New York	Polo Grounds	16,000	Buck Ewing
National League	New York Giants	New York, New York	Polo Grounds	16,000	George Davis
National League	Philadelphia Phillies	Philadelphia, Pennsylvania	National League Park	18,000	Bill Shettsline
National League	Pittsburgh Pirates	Allegheny, Pennsylvania	Exposition Park	16,000	Fred Clarke
National League	St. Louis Cardinals	St. Louis, Missouri	League Park (St. Louis)	15,200	Patsy Tebeau
National League	St. Louis Cardinals	St. Louis, Missouri	League Park (St. Louis)	15,200	Louie Heilbroner

1. In today's Pittsburgh, Pennsylvania.

== Standings ==
=== National League ===
National League
Team	W	L	Pct.	GB	Home	Road
Brooklyn Superbas	82	54	.603	—	43‍–‍26	39‍–‍28
Pittsburgh Pirates	79	60	.568	4½	42‍–‍28	37‍–‍32
Philadelphia Phillies	75	63	.543	8	45‍–‍23	30‍–‍40
Boston Beaneaters	66	72	.478	17	42‍–‍29	24‍–‍43
St. Louis Cardinals	65	75	.464	19	40‍–‍31	25‍–‍44
Chicago Orphans	65	75	.464	19	45‍–‍30	20‍–‍45
Cincinnati Reds	62	77	.446	21½	27‍–‍34	35‍–‍43
New York Giants	60	78	.435	23	38‍–‍31	22‍–‍47

=== Tie games ===
15 tie games, which are not factored into winning percentage or games behind (and were often replayed again), occurred throughout the season.

- Boston Beaneaters, 4
- Brooklyn Superbas, 6
- Chicago Orphans, 6
- Cincinnati Reds, 5
- New York Giants, 3
- Pittsburgh Pirates, 1
- St. Louis Cardinals, 2

== Postseason ==
=== Bracket ===
Chronicle-Telegraph Cup
NL1	Brooklyn Superbas	5	4	0	6
NL2	Pittsburgh Pirates	2	2	10	1

== Managerial changes ==
=== Off-season ===
Team	Former Manager	New Manager
Baltimore Orioles	John McGraw	Team folded
Chicago Orphans	Tom Burns	Tom Loftus
Cincinnati Reds	Buck Ewing	Bob Allen
Cleveland Spiders	Joe Quinn	Team folded
Louisville Colonels	Fred Clarke	Team folded
New York Giants	Fred Hoey	Buck Ewing
Pittsburgh Pirates	Patsy Donovan	Fred Clarke
Washington Senators	Arthur Irwin	Team folded

=== In-season ===
Team	Former Manager	New Manager
New York Giants	Buck Ewing	George Davis
St. Louis Cardinals	Patsy Tebeau	Louie Heilbroner

== League leaders ==
=== National League ===
Hitting leaders
Stat	Player	Total
AVG	Honus Wagner (PIT)	.381
OPS	Honus Wagner (PIT)	1.007
HR	Herman Long (BSN)	12
RBI	Elmer Flick (PHI)	110
R	Roy Thomas (PHI)	132
H	Willie Keeler (BRO)	204
SB	Patsy Donovan (STL); George Van Haltren (NYG)	45

Pitching leaders
Stat	Player	Total
W	Joe McGinnity (BRO)	28
L	Bill Carrick (NYG)	22
ERA	Rube Waddell (PIT)	2.37
K	Noodles Hahn (CIN)	132
IP	Joe McGinnity (BRO)	343.0
SV	Frank Kitson (BRO)	4
WHIP	Rube Waddell (PIT)	1.107

== Milestones ==
=== Batters ===
- George Van Haltren (NYG):
  - Recorded his 500th career stolen base against the Cincinnati Reds on June 4. He became the ninth player to reach this mark.

=== Pitchers ===
==== No-hitters ====
- Noodles Hahn (CIN):
  - Hahn threw his first career no-hitter and the third no-hitter in franchise history, by defeating the Philadelphia Phillies 4–0 on July 12. Hahn walked two, hit one by pitch, and struck out eight.

==== Other pitching accomplishments ====
- Kid Nichols (BSN):
  - Became the sixth member of the 300-win club, defeating the Chicago Orphans on July 7, winning 11–4.

== Home field attendance ==
Team name	Wins	%±	Home attendance	%±	Per game
Philadelphia Phillies	75	−20.2%	301,913	−22.4%	4,313
St. Louis Cardinals	65	−22.6%	270,000	−27.8%	3,750
Pittsburgh Pirates	79	3.9%	264,000	4.8%	3,771
Chicago Orphans	65	−13.3%	248,577	−29.4%	3,228
Boston Beaneaters	66	−30.5%	202,000	0.8%	2,767
New York Giants	60	0.0%	190,000	56.5%	2,676
Brooklyn Superbas	82	−18.8%	183,000	−32.1%	2,507
Cincinnati Reds	62	−25.3%	170,000	−34.5%	2,698

== See also ==
- 1900 in baseball (Events, Births, Deaths)
