= Sam Dungan =

American baseball player (1866–1939)

- Outfielder
- Born: July 29, 1866; Ferndale, California, US
- Died: March 16, 1939 (aged 72); Santa Ana, California, US
- Batted: Right Threw: Unknown

MLB debut
- April 12, 1892, for the Chicago Colts

Last MLB appearance
- September 27, 1901, for the Chicago Colts

MLB statistics
- Batting average: .301
- Home runs: 3
- Runs batted in: 197
- Stats at Baseball Reference

Teams
- Chicago Colts (1892–1894); Louisville Colonels (1894); Chicago Orphans (1900); Washington Senators (1901)

Samuel Morrison Dungan (July 29, 1866 – March 16, 1939) was a professional baseball player, principally an outfielder, but also a catcher and first baseman, for 16 years from 1890 to 1905.

A California native, he attended Michigan State Normal School from 1886 to 1888 and began playing professional baseball with the Oakland Colonels in 1890. After winning the California League batting title in 1890, he played in Major League Baseball for Cap Anson's Chicago Colts from 1892 to 1894.

He played six seasons from 1894 to 1899 for the Detroit Tigers of the Western League, led the team in batting each year, hit .447 in 1894, .424 in 1895, .372 in 1897, and won the Western League batting title in 1899. In 1900, he played for the Kansas City Blues of the newly established American League, compiling a .350 batting average to become the first American League batting champion. In 1901, the American League became a major league, and Dungan hit .320 (10th best in the league) for the Washington Senators. He concluded his professional baseball career playing for the Milwaukee Brewers of the American Association (1902–1903) and Memphis Egyptians of the Southern Association (1903–1905).

After retiring from baseball, Dungan returned to Orange County, California, where he lived for the rest of his life, having homes in Laguna Beach and Santa Ana. He was an orange grower and owned property in Talbert (now known as Fountain Valley) and Lemon Heights (now known as North Tustin). He died in 1939 at age 72.

== Early years ==
Dungan was born on July 29, 1866 in Ferndale, California. He was the son of boat builder Robert M. Dungan and Joanna (Jenkins) Dungan. He attended Ferndale High School. The family moved to Los Angeles County in 1877 and eventually settled in a section of Orange County (between southern Santa Ana and Fountain Valley) known as "Gospel Swamp". From 1886 to 1888, Dungan attended the Michigan State Normal School (later renamed Eastern Michigan University) in Ypsilanti, Michigan. When he returned from college, he played baseball for a team in Fairview, California, starting in July 1888. In 1889, he played for baseball teams in Pasadena, San Bernardino, and San Diego.

== Professional baseball ==
=== San Diego and Oakland ===
After starting the 1890 season with San Diego, Dungan joined the Oakland Colonels in March 1890. Oakland manager T.P. Robinson said at the time, "I believe Dungan is the best hitter we've ever had here." After one of his first games with the club, The San Francisco Call described him as "a great outfielder" and "a vicious hitter". He finished the season with a .332 batting average, 174 hits, 159 runs scored, and 65 stolen bases in 533 at bats. He was the batting champion of the California League with an average 17 points higher than any other player.

=== Milwaukee and Omaha ===
Dungan began the 1891 season with the Milwaukee Brewers of the Western League. In late July, the Omaha club was reorganized, and each team in the league was required to release a number of players to the Omaha club. Milwaukee released Dungan to Omaha.

=== Chicago ===
In 1892, Dungan made it to the major leagues with Cap Anson's Chicago Colts of the National League. He appeared in 113 games as an outfielder for the 1892 Colts and compiled a .284 batting average with 19 doubles, seven triples, and 15 stolen bases.

Dungan remained with the Colts in 1893, appearing in 107 games as an outfielder, raising his batting average to .297 with 23 doubles and 7 triples. His 138 hits in 1893 was second to Bill Dahlen on the 1893 Colts.

Dungan appeared in only 10 games for the Colts in 1894, as his batting average dropped to .231 in 46 plate appearances. He was farmed out to the Detroit team in the Western League and then traded to the Louisville Colonels for pitcher Scott Stratton. He appeared in 10 games for the Colonels in 1894, compiling a .344 batting average in 37 plate appearances.

=== Detroit ===
In July 1894, Dungan rejoined the Detroit club of the Western League (known as the Creams in 1894 and the Tigers thereafter) after being released by Louisville. Dungan was popular in Detroit from the start. On July 12, when he made his return to the club following his stint in Louisville, Dungan was greeted warmly by the Detroit fans. The Detroit Free Press wrote:

The feature of the game was the reappearance of Sam Dungan in a Detroit uniform. On the third base bleacher fence was a banner, "Welcome home. This push is for Dungan." Behind it were a dozen or more men armed with horns, which they used heroically at times. . . . Dungan marched up to the plate. He was cheered to the echo and displayed a small portion of his shiny skull in recognition of the applause. Then a man advanced and handed him a floral bat from some local admirers and the yelling was louder than ever. [Dungan then hit an inside-the-park home run.] Men and women arose and cheered the sturdy fielder, players slapped him on the back, and the horns on the bleachers testified that there wasn't a happier "push" in the whole town.

During the 1894 season, Dungan compiled a .447 batting average for Detroit, 76 points higher than the second best hitter on the club.

Dungan remained with the Detroit baseball club for six years from 1894 to 1899 and appeared in every game played by the club from 1895 to 1899. He led Detroit in batting in 1894 (.447), 1895 (.424), 1897 (.372), 1898 (.325), and 1899 (.347). He won the Western League batting championship in 1899, and finished second in 1894, third in 1895, sixth in 1897, and fourth in 1898. Though generally not considered to be a great defensive outfielder, he also led all outfielders in the league with 42 assists in 1896.

During the 1897 season, Detroit teammate Harry Steinfeldt developed bad shins from being hit by the ball. Dungan gave Steinfeldt football shin guards to wear under his socks, which helped the shins heal. One of Detroit's catchers then began using the shin guards, and Dungan was later credited as the person who introduced the use of shin guards to baseball. Roger Bresnahan also claimed credit for the innovation, but Dungan noted that Bresnahan was pitching in the minor leagues when Dungan introduced the device.

In July 1897, Dungan was arrested for alienating the affections of the wife of Dr. W. D. MacQuisten. MacQuisten withdrew the criminal charges two days later.

=== Chicago and Kansas City ===
Dungan returned to Chicago briefly in 1900, appearing in six games and compiling a .267 batting average. On May 17, 1900, he was traded to Kansas City Blues of the newly established American League as part of a trade that sent John Ganzel to Chicago in exchange for Dungan, Bill Phyle, and Bill Everitt.

Dungan played first base appeared in 112 games for Kansas City during the 1900 season. He compiled a .350 batting average, reported in some sources as .337, best in the American League among players with at least 50 games played. He is remembered as the first American League batting champion.

=== Washington ===
In 1901, as the American League gained designation as a major league, the Kansas City Blues became the Washington Senators. Dungan appeared in 138 games for the 1901 Senators, 104 as an outfielder and 35 as a first baseman. He compiled a .320 batting average, 10th highest in the American League. His tally of 179 hits in 1901 was fifth highest in the league. He appeared in his last major league game on September 27, 1901, at age 35.

=== Milwaukee and Memphis ===
Dungan remained active in professional baseball for four more years, playing for the Milwaukee Brewers of the American Association (1902–1903) and Memphis Egyptians of the Southern Association (1903–1905). He compiled a .342 batting average in his first season with Memphis. He helped Memphis win Southern Association championships in 1903 and 1904, but saw his batting average drop to .288 in 1904 and .286 in 1905.

In 1902, Dungan reportedly discovered Gavvy Cravath while playing a game of Sunday ball in Southern California. Dungan set up a tryout for Cravath with Jim Morley of the Los Angeles Angels. Cravath went on to lead the National League six times in RBIs.

Dungan announced his retirement from baseball in January 1906 at age 39. Dungan later recalled: "I was fed up on baseball although I had one of my best years in 1905. I made up my mind I didn't want to follow the game indefinitely, limping from one place to another as my ability declined. And I had no managerial aspirations. So I just up and quit."

== Family and later years ==
During the 1890 season in Oakland, Dungan became acquainted with Mamie Bodgard, a fan of the Oakland club. The two were married in Los Angeles in March 1891. However, Dungan left her two hours after the ceremony, reportedly after discovering that she had previously been married and widowed. Dungan's flight from his bride became the subject of newspaper stories published across the country. The marriage ended in divorce; sources are in dispute as to whether Bodgard's request for alimony was granted or denied.

In 1900, Dungan was married to Laura B. Lippy. They had two children, Dorothy Eleanor and Myron Robert.

After retiring from baseball, Dungan returned to his home town of Santa Ana, California, where he was employed as a rancher and citrus grower. He purchased 20 acres of land in Talbert, California (now known as Fountain Valley), in 1893; he leased the land for farming of potatoes, celery, beets, and beans. In 1907, Dungan built a cottage home in Laguna Beach where he lived for several years. He also bought 12 acres in Lemon Heights (now known as North Tustin) in 1912. In 1917, he built a house at 221 South Broadway in Santa Ana, where he lived for the rest of his life.

Dungan's wife, Laura, died in December 1928 at their home in Santa Ana. Dungan remarried in September 1933 to Lula Mary Lewis.

In March 1939, Dungan died at his home in Santa Ana. The cause of his death was a heart attack that followed uremic poisoning. He was buried at Fairhaven Cemetery (now known as Santa Ana Cemetery). He left his estate in equal shares to his widow, Lulu Mary, and two children.
