= 1900 Boston Beaneaters season =

1900 Boston Beaneaters
- League: National League
- Ballpark: South End Grounds
- City: Boston, Massachusetts
- Record: 66–72–4 (.478)
- League place: 4th
- Owners: Arthur Soden
- Managers: Frank Selee (11th season)

The 1900 Boston Beaneaters season was the 30th season of the franchise. They finished fourth in the National League with a record of 66–72–4 (.478), 17.0 games behind the first-place Brooklyn Superbas.

== Regular season ==
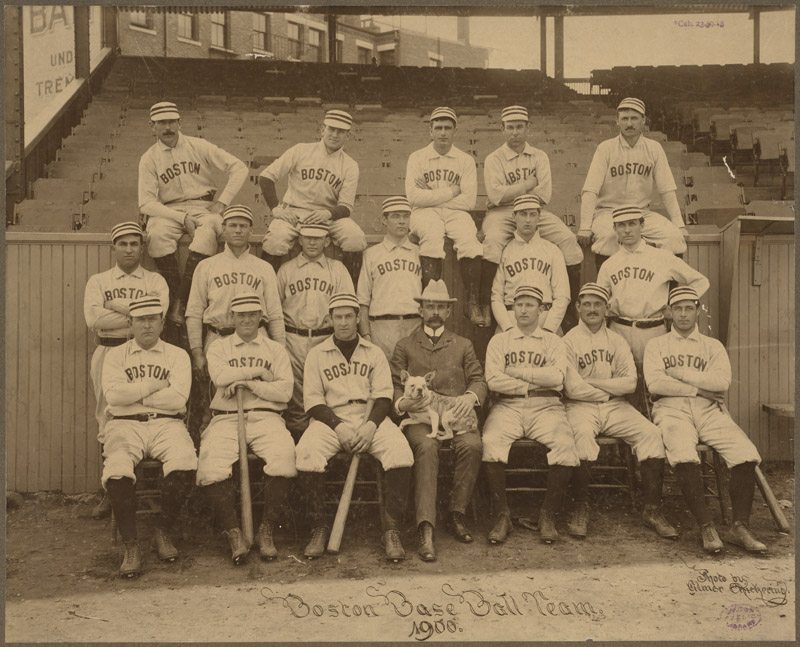
1900 Boston Beaneaters

=== Season standings ===
National League
Team	W	L	Pct.	GB	Home	Road
Brooklyn Superbas	82	54	.603	—	43‍–‍26	39‍–‍28
Pittsburgh Pirates	79	60	.568	4½	42‍–‍28	37‍–‍32
Philadelphia Phillies	75	63	.543	8	45‍–‍23	30‍–‍40
Boston Beaneaters	66	72	.478	17	42‍–‍29	24‍–‍43
St. Louis Cardinals	65	75	.464	19	40‍–‍31	25‍–‍44
Chicago Orphans	65	75	.464	19	45‍–‍30	20‍–‍45
Cincinnati Reds	62	77	.446	21½	27‍–‍34	35‍–‍43
New York Giants	60	78	.435	23	38‍–‍31	22‍–‍47

=== Record vs. opponents ===
1900 National League record Sources:
Team	BSN	BRO	CHI	CIN	NYG	PHI	PIT	STL
Boston	—	4–16–2	12–8	13–7	11–7–2	9–11	5–15	12–8
Brooklyn	16–4–2	—	10–10–1	15–4–2	10–10	10–8	8–11–1	13–7
Chicago	8–12	10–10–1	—	9–11–1	12–8–1	9–11–1	8–12	9–11–2
Cincinnati	7–13	4–15–2	11–9–1	—	7–13	9–11–2	12–8	12–8
New York	7–11–2	10–10	8–12–1	13–7	—	7–13	9–11	6–14
Philadelphia	11–9	8–10	11–9–1	11–9–2	13–7	—	9–11	12–18
Pittsburgh	15–5	11–8–1	12–8	8–12	11–9	11–9	—	11–9
St. Louis	8–12	7–13	11–9–2	8–12	14–6	8–12	9–11	—

=== Roster ===
1900 Boston Beaneaters
Roster
Pitchers: Harvey Bailey; Rome Chambers; George Cuppy; Bill Dinneen; Ted Lewis; Kid Nichols; Togie Pittinger; Vic Willis	Catchers: Boileryard Clarke; Jack Clements; Joe Connor; Billy Sullivan; Infielders: Jimmy Collins; Herman Long; Bobby Lowe; Fred Tenney	Outfielders: Shad Barry; Hugh Duffy; Buck Freeman; Billy Hamilton; Chick Stahl	Manager: Frank Selee

== Player stats ==
=== Batting ===
==== Starters by position ====
Note: Pos = Position; G = Games played; AB = At bats; H = Hits; Avg. = Batting average; HR = Home runs; RBI = Runs batted in

Pos	Player	G	AB	H	Avg.	HR	RBI
C	Boileryard Clarke	81	270	85	.315	1	30
1B	Fred Tenney	112	437	122	.279	1	56
2B	Bobby Lowe	127	474	132	.278	3	71
SS	Herman Long	125	486	127	.261	12	66
3B	Jimmy Collins	142	586	178	.304	6	95
OF	Buck Freeman	117	418	126	.301	6	65
OF	Chick Stahl	136	553	163	.295	5	82
OF	Billy Hamilton	136	520	173	.333	1	47

==== Other batters ====
Note: G = Games played; AB = At bats; H = Hits; Avg. = Batting average; HR = Home runs; RBI = Runs batted in

Player	G	AB	H	Avg.	HR	RBI
Shad Barry	81	254	66	.260	1	37
Billy Sullivan	72	238	65	.273	8	41
Hugh Duffy	55	181	55	.304	2	31
Jack Clements	16	42	13	.310	1	10
Joe Connor	7	19	4	.211	0	4

=== Pitching ===
==== Starting pitchers ====
Note: G = Games pitched; IP = Innings pitched; W = Wins; L = Losses; ERA = Earned run average; SO = Strikeouts

Player	G	IP	W	L	ERA	SO
Bill Dinneen	40	320.2	20	14	3.12	107
Vic Willis	32	236.0	10	17	4.19	53
Kid Nichols	29	231.1	13	16	3.07	53
Edward M. Lewis	30	209.0	13	12	4.13	66
Togie Pittinger	18	114.0	2	9	5.13	27
George Cuppy	17	105.1	8	4	3.08	23

==== Other pitchers ====
Note: G = Games pitched; IP = Innings pitched; W = Wins; L = Losses; ERA = Earned run average; SO = Strikeouts

Player	G	IP	W	L	ERA	SO
Harvey Bailey	4	20.0	0	0	4.95	9

==== Relief pitchers ====
Note: G = Games pitched; W = Wins; L = Losses; SV = Saves; ERA = Earned run average; SO = Strikeouts

Player	G	W	L	SV	ERA	SO
Rome Chambers	1	0	0	1	11.25	2
