= Mike Grady (baseball) =

American baseball player (1869–1943)

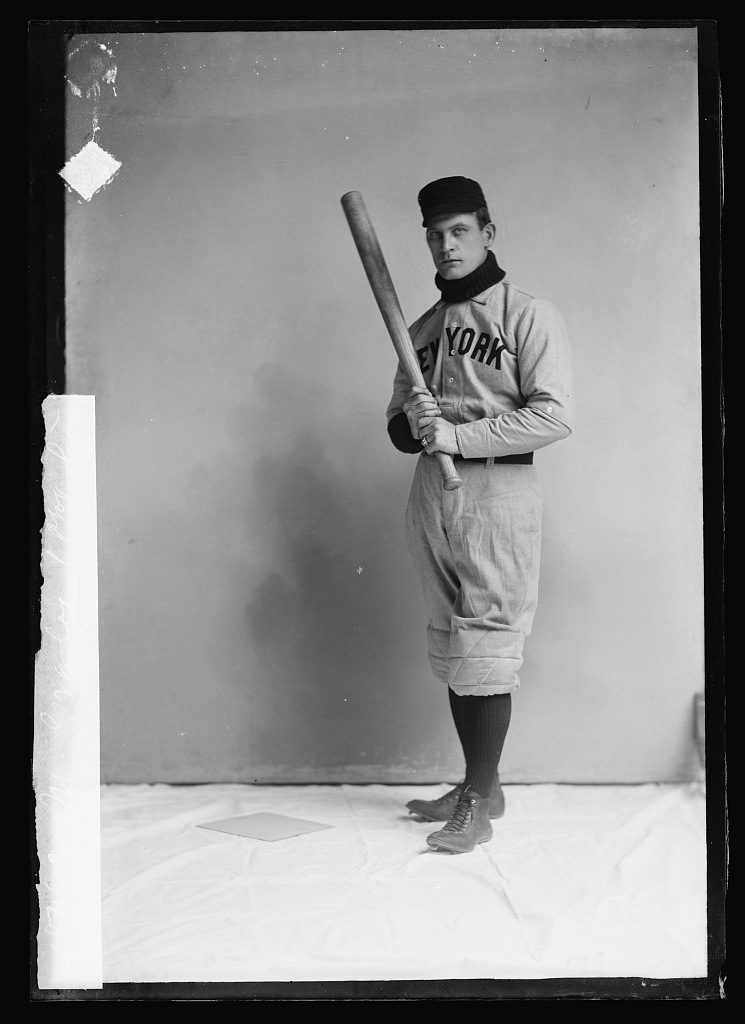
- Mike Grady c. 1895
- Catcher / First baseman
- Born: December 23, 1869; Kennett Square, Pennsylvania, U.S.
- Died: December 3, 1943 (aged 73); Kennett Square, Pennsylvania, U.S.
- Batted: Left Threw: Right

MLB debut
- April 24, 1894, for the Philadelphia Phillies

Last MLB appearance
- September 19, 1906, for the St. Louis Cardinals

MLB statistics
- Batting average: .294
- Home runs: 35
- Runs batted in: 461
- Stats at Baseball Reference

Teams
- Philadelphia Phillies (1894–1897); St. Louis Browns (1897); New York Giants (1898–1900); Washington Senators (1901); St. Louis Cardinals (1904–1906)

Michael William Grady (December 23, 1869 – December 3, 1943) was an American professional baseball player who played catcher in the Major Leagues from 1894 to 1906. Grady played for the Philadelphia Phillies, New York Giants, Washington Senators, and St. Louis Cardinals.

Grady was one of the first players from Chester County, Pennsylvania, to play Major League Baseball. Before signing with the Phillies, he played in the Brandywine AA League of West Chester.

Grady made his major league debut on April 24, 1894 as a member of the Phillies. Grady hit .363 over the course of his rookie season, during which the pitching mound was moved back to its current distance of 60 feet, 6 inches from the plate and three Phillies outfielders batted over .400.

Grady is largely famous for an apocryphal story about his committing four fielding errors on a single play, a story he would repeatedly tell long after his playing days were over; however, there is no contemporaneous record of this.

Grady compiled a .294 career average over his 11 major league seasons. He led the league in OPS (a commonly used stat today that adds on-base percentage with slugging percentage) for a catcher in 1904 and 1905, and finished third in that category in his final season in 1906.

All told, Grady finished his career with 884 hits, 35 home runs and 461 RBIs. After a shaky rookie season during which he posted a .900 fielding percentage, he improved his defense considerably, rounding out his career with a .950 mark in that category.

He later was a player/manager in 1907 and 1908 in the Tri-State League.
