= Ed Scott (pitcher) =

American baseball player (1870–1933)

- Pitcher
- Born: August 12, 1870; Walbridge, Ohio
- Died: November 1, 1933 (aged 63); Toledo, Ohio
- Batted: Right Threw: Right

MLB debut
- April 19, 1900, for the Cincinnati Reds

Last MLB appearance
- August 3, 1901, for the Cleveland Blues

MLB statistics
- Win–loss record: 23–26
- Strikeouts: 110
- Earned run average: 4.01
- Stats at Baseball Reference

Teams
- Cincinnati Reds (1900); Cleveland Blues (1901)

Phillip Edwin Scott (August 12, 1870 – November 1, 1933) was a Major League Baseball player who played pitcher from 1900-1901. He would play for the Cincinnati Reds and Cleveland Blues.

He is notable for becoming only the second Major League pitcher (and fourth MLB player overall) in history to hit a home run in their final at-bat, doing so on August 3, 1901 for Cleveland, which also made him the first to do so in the American League.

== Personal life ==
Son of James C. and Sarah F. (Loop) Scott, Ed Scott married about 1890 Olive Faneuff, daughter of Maxim and Hermine (Beaugrand) Faneuff.
