= Pearce Chiles =

American baseball player (1867–1933)

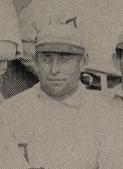
- Outfielder/Infielder
- Born: May 28, 1867; Deepwater, Missouri, U.S.
- Died: December 11, 1933 (aged 66); Talmage, California, U.S.
- Batted: Right Threw: Right

MLB debut
- April 18, 1899, for the Philadelphia Phillies

Last MLB appearance
- October 13, 1900, for the Philadelphia Phillies

MLB statistics
- Batting average: .294
- Home runs: 3
- Runs batted in: 99
- Stats at Baseball Reference

Teams
- Philadelphia Phillies (1899–1900)

Pearce Nuget Chiles (May 28, 1867 – December 11, 1933), nicknamed "What's The Use", was an American professional baseball player who played as both an outfielder and infielder in the Major Leagues from 1899-1900 for the Philadelphia Phillies.

During his time with the Phillies as a 3rd base coach, he became infamous for his role in sign stealing. Among others, Cincinnati Reds shortstop Tommy Corcoran noticed that Chiles' leg twitched, but only at the Baker Bowl and only when he stood in the same omnipresent puddle which seemed to persist even when it didn't rain. On September 17, 1900, Corcoran ran to where Chiles was standing and kicked his cleats in the dirt until he found a wooden box with protruding wires. Through this device, someone in the stadium was stealing opponents’ pitch signs and signaling Chiles via electrical pulses from the box. Chiles then verbally fed the pitch to the batter. Upon discovery, the umpire made Chiles change places, but no further penalties or fines were ever assessed. Chiles is a distant cousin of former US President John Tyler.
