= Walt Woods =

American baseball player (1875–1951)

- Pitcher / Second baseman
- Born: April 28, 1875; Rye, New Hampshire, U.S.
- Died: October 30, 1951 (aged 76); Portsmouth, New Hampshire, U.S.
- Batted: Right Threw: Right

MLB debut
- April 20, 1898, for the Chicago Orphans

Last MLB appearance
- April 27, 1900, for the Pittsburgh Pirates

MLB statistics
- Win–loss record: 18–26
- Earned run average: 3.34
- Strikeouts: 48
- Batting average: .164
- Home runs: 1
- Runs batted in: 22
- Stats at Baseball Reference

Teams
- Chicago Orphans (1898); Louisville Colonels (1899); Pittsburgh Pirates (1900)

Walter Sydney Woods (April 28, 1875 – October 30, 1951) was a professional baseball player. He played all or part of three seasons in Major League Baseball from 1898 to 1900. While he was primarily a pitcher, he also appeared at second base, shortstop, third base, and all three outfield positions. He also had an extensive career in minor league baseball, playing from 1895 to 1914.
