= Harvey Bailey (baseball) =

American baseball player (1876–1922)

- Pitcher
- Born: November 24, 1876; Palmyra, Michigan, U.S.
- Died: July 10, 1922 (aged 45); Toledo, Ohio, U.S.
- Batted: Unknown Threw: Left

MLB debut
- June 30, 1899, for the Boston Beaneaters

Last MLB appearance
- May 21, 1900, for the Boston Beaneaters

MLB statistics
- Win–loss record: 6–4
- Earned run average: 4.13
- Strikeouts: 35
- Stats at Baseball Reference

Teams
- Boston Beaneaters (1899–1900)

Harvey Francis Bailey (November 24, 1876 – July 10, 1922) was an American Major League Baseball pitcher who played for two seasons. He played for the Boston Beaneaters in 1899 and 1900. He played in the minor leagues through 1908.
