= 1900 Brooklyn Superbas season =

1900 Brooklyn Superbas
- League champions Chronicle-Telegraph Cup champions
- League: National League
- Ballpark: Washington Park
- City: Brooklyn, New York
- Record: 82–54 (.603)
- League place: 1st
- Owners: Charles Ebbets, Ferdinand Abell, Harry Von der Horst, Ned Hanlon
- President: Charles Ebbets
- Managers: Ned Hanlon

The 1900 Brooklyn Superbas captured their second consecutive National League championship by four and a half games. The Baltimore Orioles, which had been owned by the same group, folded after the 1899 season when such arrangements were outlawed, and a number of the Orioles' players, including star pitcher Joe McGinnity, were reassigned to the Superbas.

== Offseason ==
- January 1900: Farmer Steelman was purchased by the Superbas from the Louisville Colonels.
- March 1900: Kit McKenna, Pat Crisham and Candy LaChance were purchased from the Superbas by the Cleveland Blues.
- March 10, 1900: Bill Keister, John McGraw and Wilbert Robinson were purchased from the Superbas by the St. Louis Cardinals.

Before opening day in April 1900, Brooklyn manager Ned Hanlon made a public offer of $10,000 to purchase Nap Lajoie from the Phillies which would be rebuffed by the Phillies ownership.

== Regular season ==
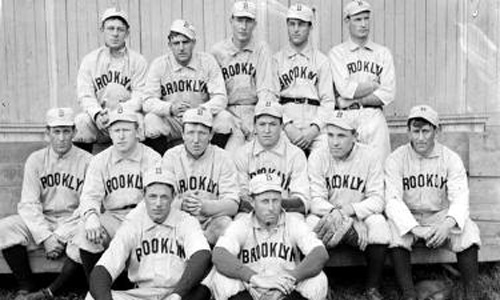
The 1900 Brooklyn Superbas

=== Season standings ===
National League
| Team | W | L | Pct. | GB | Home | Road |
|---|---|---|---|---|---|---|
| Brooklyn Superbas | 82 | 54 | .603 | — | 43‍–‍26 | 39‍–‍28 |
| Pittsburgh Pirates | 79 | 60 | .568 | 4½ | 42‍–‍28 | 37‍–‍32 |
| Philadelphia Phillies | 75 | 63 | .543 | 8 | 45‍–‍23 | 30‍–‍40 |
| Boston Beaneaters | 66 | 72 | .478 | 17 | 42‍–‍29 | 24‍–‍43 |
| St. Louis Cardinals | 65 | 75 | .464 | 19 | 40‍–‍31 | 25‍–‍44 |
| Chicago Orphans | 65 | 75 | .464 | 19 | 45‍–‍30 | 20‍–‍45 |
| Cincinnati Reds | 62 | 77 | .446 | 21½ | 27‍–‍34 | 35‍–‍43 |
| New York Giants | 60 | 78 | .435 | 23 | 38‍–‍31 | 22‍–‍47 |

=== Record vs. opponents ===
1900 National League record Sources:
| Team | BSN | BRO | CHI | CIN | NYG | PHI | PIT | STL |
|---|---|---|---|---|---|---|---|---|
| Boston | — | 4–16–2 | 12–8 | 13–7 | 11–7–2 | 9–11 | 5–15 | 12–8 |
| Brooklyn | 16–4–2 | — | 10–10–1 | 15–4–2 | 10–10 | 10–8 | 8–11–1 | 13–7 |
| Chicago | 8–12 | 10–10–1 | — | 9–11–1 | 12–8–1 | 9–11–1 | 8–12 | 9–11–2 |
| Cincinnati | 7–13 | 4–15–2 | 11–9–1 | — | 7–13 | 9–11–2 | 12–8 | 12–8 |
| New York | 7–11–2 | 10–10 | 8–12–1 | 13–7 | — | 7–13 | 9–11 | 6–14 |
| Philadelphia | 11–9 | 8–10 | 11–9–1 | 11–9–2 | 13–7 | — | 9–11 | 12–18 |
| Pittsburgh | 15–5 | 11–8–1 | 12–8 | 8–12 | 11–9 | 11–9 | — | 11–9 |
| St. Louis | 8–12 | 7–13 | 11–9–2 | 8–12 | 14–6 | 8–12 | 9–11 | — |

=== Notable transactions ===
- April 1900: Steve Brodie was purchased from the Superbas by the Chicago White Sox.
- May 15, 1900: Lave Cross was purchased by the Superbas from the St. Louis Cardinals.

=== Roster ===
1900 Brooklyn Superbas
Roster
| Pitchers: Bill Donovan; Jack Dunn; Harry Howell; Brickyard Kennedy; Frank Kitson; Joe McGinnity; Jerry Nops; Gus Weyhing; Joe Yeager | Catchers: Duke Farrell; Deacon McGuire; Farmer Steelman; Infielders: Doc Casey; Lave Cross; Bill Dahlen; Tom Daly; Gene DeMontreville; Hughie Jennings; Aleck Smith | Outfielders: Fielder Jones; Willie Keeler; Joe Kelley; Jimmy Sheckard | Manager: Ned Hanlon |

== Player stats ==
=== Batting ===
==== Starters by position ====
Note: Pos = Position; G = Games played; AB = At bats; R = runs; H = Hits; Avg. = Batting average; HR = Home runs; RBI = Runs batted in; SB = Stolen bases

| Pos | Player | G | AB | R | H | Avg. | HR | RBI | SB |
|---|---|---|---|---|---|---|---|---|---|
| C | Duke Farrell | 76 | 273 | 33 | 75 | .275 | 0 | 39 | 3 |
| 1B | Hughie Jennings | 115 | 441 | 61 | 120 | .272 | 1 | 69 | 31 |
| 2B | Tom Daly | 97 | 343 | 72 | 107 | .312 | 4 | 55 | 27 |
| 3B | Lave Cross | 117 | 461 | 73 | 135 | .293 | 4 | 67 | 20 |
| SS | Bill Dahlen | 133 | 483 | 87 | 125 | .259 | 1 | 69 | 31 |
| OF | Fielder Jones | 136 | 552 | 106 | 171 | .310 | 4 | 54 | 33 |
| OF | Willie Keeler | 136 | 563 | 106 | 204 | .362 | 4 | 68 | 41 |
| OF | Jimmy Sheckard | 85 | 273 | 74 | 82 | .300 | 1 | 39 | 30 |

==== Other batters ====
Note: G = Games played; AB = At bats; R = runs; H = Hits; Avg. = Batting average; HR = Home runs; RBI = Runs batted in; SB = Stolen bases

| Player | G | AB | R | H | Avg. | HR | RBI | SB |
|---|---|---|---|---|---|---|---|---|
| Joe Kelley | 121 | 454 | 90 | 145 | .319 | 6 | 91 | 26 |
| Deacon McGuire | 71 | 241 | 20 | 69 | .286 | 0 | 34 | 2 |
| Gene DeMontreville | 69 | 234 | 34 | 57 | .244 | 0 | 28 | 21 |
| Aleck Smith | 7 | 25 | 2 | 6 | .240 | 0 | 3 | 2 |
| Farmer Steelman | 1 | 4 | 0 | 0 | .000 | 0 | 0 | 0 |
| Doc Casey | 1 | 3 | 0 | 1 | .333 | 0 | 1 | 0 |

=== Pitching ===
==== Starting pitchers ====
Note: G = Games pitched; GS = Games started; IP = Innings pitched; W = Wins; L = Losses; ERA = Earned run average; BB = Bases on balls; SO = Strikeouts; CG = Complete games

| Player | G | GS | IP | W | L | ERA | BB | SO | CG |
|---|---|---|---|---|---|---|---|---|---|
| Joe McGinnity | 44 | 37 | 343.0 | 28 | 8 | 2.94 | 113 | 93 | 32 |
| Brickyard Kennedy | 42 | 35 | 292.0 | 20 | 13 | 3.91 | 111 | 75 | 26 |
| Frank Kitson | 40 | 30 | 253.1 | 15 | 13 | 4.19 | 56 | 55 | 21 |
| Jerry Nops | 9 | 8 | 68.0 | 4 | 4 | 3.84 | 18 | 22 | 6 |
| Gus Weyhing | 8 | 8 | 48.0 | 3 | 4 | 4.31 | 20 | 8 | 3 |
| Jack Dunn | 10 | 7 | 63.0 | 3 | 4 | 5.57 | 28 | 6 | 5 |
| Bill Donovan | 5 | 4 | 31.0 | 1 | 2 | 6.68 | 18 | 13 | 2 |
| Joe Yeager | 2 | 2 | 17.0 | 1 | 1 | 6.88 | 5 | 2 | 2 |

==== Other pitchers ====
Note: G = Games pitched; GS = Games started; IP = Innings pitched; W = Wins; L = Losses; ERA = Earned run average; BB = Bases on balls; SO = Strikeouts; CG = Complete games

| Player | G | GS | IP | W | L | ERA | BB | SO | CG |
|---|---|---|---|---|---|---|---|---|---|
| Harry Howell | 21 | 10 | 110.1 | 6 | 5 | 3.75 | 36 | 26 | 7 |

== Postseason ==
=== Chronicle-Telegraph Cup ===
The Chronicle-Telegraph Cup was held just once, in 1900, and was sponsored by the Pittsburgh Chronicle Telegraph, a newspaper in the hometown of the National League's second-place finisher, the Pittsburgh Pirates. It pitted the Pirates against the Superbas in a best-of-five postseason series, with all the games taking place in Pittsburgh. The Superbas won the series, 3 games to 1.

==== Game 1 ====
October 15, 1900

| Team | 1 | 2 | 3 | 4 | 5 | 6 | 7 | 8 | 9 | R | H | E |
|---|---|---|---|---|---|---|---|---|---|---|---|---|
| Brooklyn | 0 | 0 | 3 | 1 | 0 | 1 | 0 | 0 | 0 | 5 | 13 | 1 |
| Pittsburgh | 0 | 0 | 0 | 0 | 0 | 0 | 0 | 0 | 2 | 2 | 5 | 4 |
W: Joe McGinnity (1–0) L: Rube Waddell (0–1) Att.: 4,000

==== Game 2 ====
October 16, 1900

| Team | 1 | 2 | 3 | 4 | 5 | 6 | 7 | 8 | 9 | R | H | E |
|---|---|---|---|---|---|---|---|---|---|---|---|---|
| Brooklyn | 0 | 1 | 0 | 0 | 0 | 3 | 0 | 0 | 0 | 4 | 7 | 0 |
| Pittsburgh | 0 | 0 | 0 | 1 | 0 | 0 | 1 | 0 | 0 | 2 | 4 | 6 |
W: Frank Kitson (1–0) L: Sam Leever (0–1) Att.: 1,800

==== Game 3 ====
October 17, 1900

| Team | 1 | 2 | 3 | 4 | 5 | 6 | 7 | 8 | 9 | R | H | E |
|---|---|---|---|---|---|---|---|---|---|---|---|---|
| Brooklyn | 0 | 0 | 0 | 0 | 0 | 0 | 0 | 0 | 0 | 0 | 6 | 3 |
| Pittsburgh | 3 | 1 | 0 | 0 | 2 | 0 | 1 | 3 | x | 10 | 13 | 1 |
W: Deacon Phillippe (1–0) L: Harry Howell (0–1) Att.: 2,500

==== Game 4 ====
October 18, 1900

| Team | 1 | 2 | 3 | 4 | 5 | 6 | 7 | 8 | 9 | R | H | E |
|---|---|---|---|---|---|---|---|---|---|---|---|---|
| Brooklyn | 1 | 0 | 0 | 3 | 1 | 1 | 0 | 0 | 0 | 6 | 8 | 0 |
| Pittsburgh | 0 | 0 | 0 | 0 | 0 | 1 | 0 | 0 | 0 | 1 | 9 | 3 |
W: Joe McGinnity (2–0) L: Sam Leever (0–2) Att.: 2,335
