= Tom O'Brien (outfielder) =

American baseball player (1873–1901)

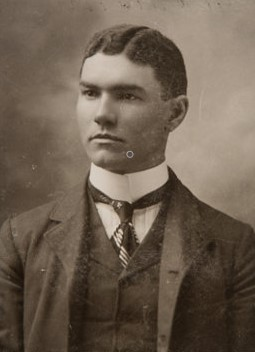
- Outfielder / First baseman
- Born: February 20, 1873; Verona, Pennsylvania, U.S.
- Died: February 3, 1901 (aged 27); Phoenix, Arizona, U.S.
- Batted: Unknown Threw: Unknown

MLB debut
- May 10, 1897, for the Baltimore Orioles

Last MLB appearance
- October 13, 1900, for the Pittsburgh Pirates

MLB statistics
- Batting average: .278
- Home runs: 10
- Runs batted in: 229
- Stats at Baseball Reference

Teams
- Baltimore Orioles (1897–1898); Pittsburgh Pirates (1898); New York Giants (1899); Pittsburgh Pirates (1900)

Thomas J. O'Brien (February 20, 1873 – February 3, 1901) was an American professional baseball outfielder and first baseman. He played in Major League Baseball (MLB) from 1897 through 1900 for the Baltimore Orioles, Pittsburgh Pirates, and New York Giants.

== Biography ==
A valuable utility man, O'Brien was able to play all positions except pitcher and catcher, although he played mostly in the outfield or at first base. He reached the majors in 1897 with the Baltimore Orioles, spending one and a half years with them before moving to the Pittsburgh Pirates (1898), New York Giants (1899), and again with Pittsburgh (1900).

His most productive season came in 1899 with the Giants, when he posted career-highs in batting average (.297), home runs (6), runs batted in (77), runs (100), and games played (150).

In a four-season career, O'Brien was a .278 hitter (436-for-1569) with 10 home runs and 229 RBI in 427 games.

== Death ==
O'Brien died in Phoenix, Arizona at the age of 27, from pneumonia resulting from lung disease. He believed his disease was caused by his drinking a large amount of salty seawater after having been told that it would cure his seasickness.

== See also ==
- List of baseball players who died during their careers
