= Warren McLaughlin =

American baseball player (1876–1923)

- Pitcher
- Born: January 22, 1876; North Plainfield, New Jersey, U.S.
- Died: October 22, 1923 (aged 47); Plainfield, New Jersey, U.S.
- Batted: Unknown Threw: Left

MLB debut
- July 7, 1900, for the Philadelphia Phillies

Last MLB appearance
- May 21, 1903, for the Philadelphia Phillies

MLB statistics
- Win–loss record: 3–3
- Earned run average: 4.75
- Strikeouts: 17
- Stats at Baseball Reference

Teams
- Philadelphia Phillies (1900); Pittsburgh Pirates (1902); Philadelphia Phillies (1903)

Warren A. McLaughlin (January 22, 1876 – October 22, 1923) was an American Major League Baseball pitcher with the Philadelphia Phillies and Pittsburgh Pirates from 1900–1903.

He began pitching for the Phillies in July 1900, after playing for semi-pro teams in New Jersey. He spent some time with New London in the Connecticut League, before signing with Pittsburgh in September 1902. He was released in March 1903.

A resident of Plainfield, New Jersey, he died at Muhlenberg Hospital on October 22, 1923, following an operation to treat emphysema as a complication of pleurisy. He is interred in Hillside Cemetery in Scotch Plains, New Jersey.
