= Henry Stein =

American baseball player (1869–1927)

- Catcher
- Born: September 22, 1869; Hannibal, Missouri
- Died: April 1, 1927 (aged 57); Hannibal, Missouri
- Batted: Unknown Threw: Left

MLB debut
- October 14, 1900, for the St. Louis Cardinals

Last MLB appearance
- October 14, 1900, for the St. Louis Cardinals

MLB statistics
- Games played: 1
- At bats: 0
- Hits: 0

Teams
- St. Louis Cardinals (1900)

Henry Edward Stein (September 22, 1869 – April 1, 1927) was an American catcher in Major League Baseball. He played one game for the St. Louis Cardinals in 1900.
