= Rome Chambers =

American baseball player (1875–1902)

- Pitcher
- Born: August 31, 1875; Weaverville, North Carolina, U.S.
- Died: August 30, 1902 (aged 26); Weaverville, North Carolina, U.S.
- Batted: Left Threw: Left

MLB debut
- May 7, 1900, for the Boston Beaneaters

Last MLB appearance
- May 7, 1900, for the Boston Beaneaters

MLB statistics
- Win–loss record: 0-0
- Earned run average: 11.25
- Strikeouts: 2
- Stats at Baseball Reference

Teams
- Boston Beaneaters (1900)

Richard Jerome "Rome" Chambers (August 31, 1875 – August 30, 1902) was a Major League Baseball pitcher who appeared in one game in 1900 with the Boston Beaneaters. He batted and threw left-handed.

He was born and died in Weaverville, North Carolina. His nickname of Rome came from a stint with an independent baseball team based out of Rome, Georgia in 1899.

== Career ==
Chambers gained recognition for his skills on the Weaverville College baseball team in the late 1890s. Following his collegiate season in 1899, Chambers attended spring training with the Boston Beaneaters in 1900 but did not secure a spot in the starting rotation. That year, Chambers had his sole major league appearance, pitching for the National League team.

He was one of only 195 players in big league baseball that year, as the National League was the sole major league, comprising eight teams. In that game, Chambers pitched four innings and gave up five earned runs. He relieved pitcher Bill Dinneen during the sixth inning of a game against the New York Gothams, but faced control issues, as indicated by a summary from the National Baseball Hall of Fame and Museum.

Following his brief stint in the majors, Chambers played with minor league teams in Toronto and Indianapolis.

He has been described as being Western North Carolina's first homegrown athlete to play Major League Baseball.
