= Tom Thomas (baseball) =

American baseball player (1873–1942)

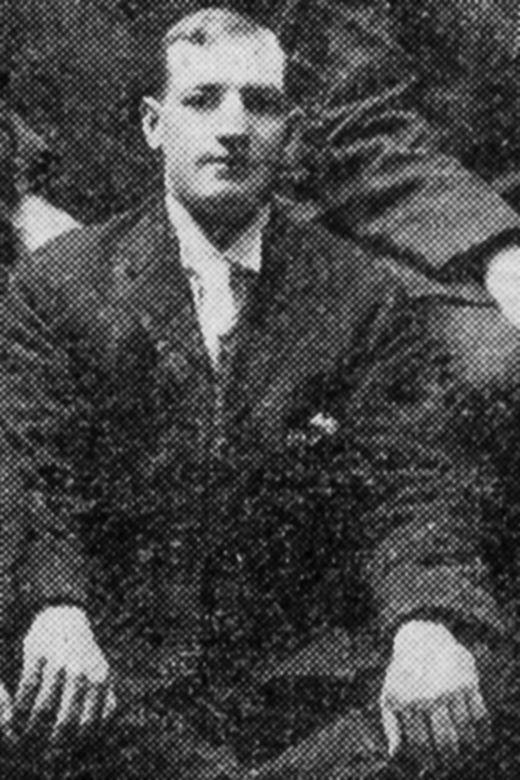
- Pitcher
- Born: December 27, 1873; Shawnee, Ohio, U.S.
- Died: September 23, 1942 (aged 68); Shawnee, Ohio, U.S.
- Batted: Right Threw: Right

MLB debut
- September 20, 1894, for the Cleveland Spiders

Last MLB appearance
- June 18, 1900, for the St. Louis Cardinals

MLB statistics
- Win–loss record: 3-3
- Earned run average: 3.31
- Strikeouts: 15
- Stats at Baseball Reference

Teams
- Cleveland Spiders (1894); St. Louis Perfectos/Cardinals (1899–1900)

Thomas Robert "Savage Tom" Thomas (December 27, 1873 – September 23, 1942) was an American pitcher in Major League Baseball. He played for the Cleveland Spiders and St. Louis Perfectos/Cardinals.
