= Tim Donahue =

American baseball player (1870–1902)

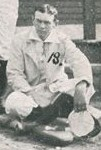
- Catcher
- Born: June 8, 1870; Raynham, Massachusetts, U.S.
- Died: June 12, 1902 (aged 32); Taunton, Massachusetts, U.S.
- Batted: Left Threw: Right

MLB debut
- July 28, 1891, for the Boston Reds

Last MLB appearance
- May 17, 1902, for the Washington Senators

MLB statistics
- Batting average: .236
- Home runs: 2
- Runs batted in: 163
- Stats at Baseball Reference

Teams
- Boston Reds (1891); Chicago Colts/Orphans (1895–1900); Washington Senators (1902)

Timothy Cornelius Donahue (June 8, 1870 – June 12, 1902) was an American catcher in both the National League and briefly the American Association, which would be absorbed into the Major League. He was nicknamed "Bridget" for unknown reasons.

He debuted in 1891 with the Boston Reds, their final season, for only 7 bats. He would appear most prominently with the Chicago Colts starting in the 1895 season, the predecessor to the Chicago Cubs.

Donahue died shortly after the season. He is buried at St. Joseph Cemetery in Taunton.
