= Bert Conn =

American baseball player (1879–1944)

- Pitcher/Second baseman
- Born: September 22, 1879; Philadelphia, Pennsylvania, U.S.
- Died: November 2, 1944 (aged 65); Philadelphia, Pennsylvania, U.S.
- Batted: Unknown Threw: Right

MLB debut
- September 16, 1898, for the Philadelphia Phillies

Last MLB appearance
- May 8, 1901, for the Philadelphia Phillies

MLB statistics
- Win–loss record: 0–3
- strikeouts: 3
- Earned run average: 7.77
- Stats at Baseball Reference

Teams
- Philadelphia Phillies (1898; 1900-1901)

Albert Thomas Conn (September 22, 1879 – November 2, 1944) was an American former Major League Baseball pitcher/second baseman. He was born on September 22, 1879, in Philadelphia, Pennsylvania. Bert played three seasons in MLB. In 1898 and 1900, he was a pitcher with the Philadelphia Phillies, and in 1901 he was a second baseman with the Phillies. Conn had an 0–3 career record with 17.3 innings, and had 8 career hits in 30 at bats for a .267 average. He died on November 2, 1944, in Philadelphia.
