= Jute Bell =

- Pitcher
- Born: May 30, 1900; Jellico, Tennessee, U.S.
- Died: December 7, 1991 (aged 91); Nashville, Tennessee, U.S.
- Batted: Right Threw: Right

Negro league baseball debut
- 1923, for the Birmingham Black Barons

Last appearance
- 1931, for the Louisville White Sox
- Stats at Baseball Reference

Teams
- Birmingham Black Barons (1923, 1929–1930); Detroit Stars (1924); Memphis Red Sox (1927–1928); Louisville White Sox (1931)

Julian "Jute" Bell (May 30, 1900 – December 7, 1991) was an American professional baseball pitcher in the Negro leagues. He played from 1923 to 1931 with several teams.
