= Mike Smith (1890s outfielder) =

American baseball player (1868–1945)

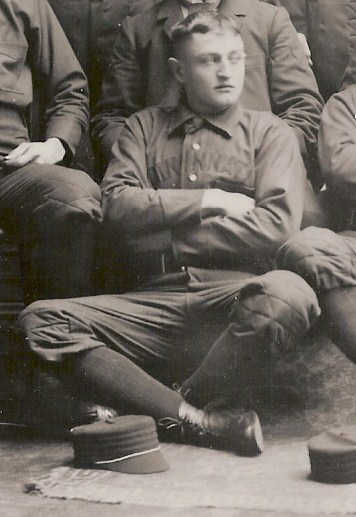
- Outfielder / Pitcher
- Born: March 23, 1868; Pittsburgh, Pennsylvania
- Died: November 3, 1945 (aged 77); Pittsburgh, Pennsylvania
- Batted: Left Threw: Left

MLB debut
- September 10, 1886, for the Cincinnati Red Stockings

Last MLB appearance
- June 15, 1901, for the Boston Beaneaters

MLB statistics
- Batting average: .310
- Home runs: 37
- Hits: 1,456
- Runs batted in: 665
- Win–loss record: 75–57
- Earned run average: 3.35
- Strikeouts: 525
- Stats at Baseball Reference

Teams
- Cincinnati Red Stockings (1886–1889); Pittsburgh Pirates (1892–1897); Cincinnati Reds (1898–1900); New York Giants (1900); Pittsburgh Pirates (1901); Boston Beaneaters (1901)

Elmer Ellsworth "Mike" Smith (March 23, 1868 – November 3, 1945) was an American professional baseball player who played as a pitcher and as an outfielder for 14 seasons in the major leagues from 1886 to 1901. He began his career as a pitcher for the Cincinnati Red Stockings, leading the AA in earned run average in 1887, then switched to playing the outfield when he began playing for the Pittsburgh Pirates in 1892. He returned the Reds for three seasons from 1898 to 1900, and then played one partial season with the New York Giants. He appeared in four games for the Pirates in 1901, then finished the season, and his career, with the Boston Beaneaters.

== See also ==
- List of Major League Baseball career triples leaders
- List of Major League Baseball career stolen bases leaders
- List of Major League Baseball annual ERA leaders
