= John Cavanaugh (baseball) =

American baseball player (1900-1961)

- Third baseman
- Born: June 5, 1900; Reading, Pennsylvania, U.S.
- Died: January 14, 1961 (aged 60); New Brunswick, New Jersey, U.S.
- Batted: Right Threw: Right

MLB debut
- July 7, 1919, for the Philadelphia Phillies

Last MLB appearance
- July 7, 1919, for the Philadelphia Phillies

MLB statistics
- Batting average: .000
- At-bats: 1
- Stats at Baseball Reference

Teams
- Philadelphia Phillies (1919)

John Joseph Cavanaugh (June 5, 1900 – January 14, 1961) was an American Major League Baseball third baseman. He played in one game for the Philadelphia Phillies on July 7 during the 1919 Philadelphia Phillies season, and was the first player born in the 1900s to appear in a Major League Baseball game.

== Career ==
Following his one game played during the 1919 season as a 19-year-old, Cavanaugh played in parts of 3 minor league seasons. He spent 1921 and 1922 with the Reading Aces of the International League and 1924 with the Wilkes-Barre Barons of the New York-Penn League.
