= Bill Everitt (baseball) =

American baseball player (1868–1938)

- First baseman / Third baseman
- Born: December 13, 1868; Fort Wayne, Indiana, U.S.
- Died: January 19, 1938 (aged 69); Denver, Colorado, U.S.
- Batted: Left Threw: Right

MLB debut
- April 18, 1895, for the Chicago Colts

Last MLB appearance
- June 24, 1901, for the Washington Senators

MLB statistics
- Batting average: .317
- Home runs: 11
- Runs batted in: 341
- Stolen bases: 186
- Stats at Baseball Reference

Teams
- Chicago Colts/Orphans (1895–1900); Washington Senators (1901)

William Lee "Wild Bill" Everitt (December 13, 1868 – January 19, 1938) was an American infielder in Major League Baseball from 1895 to 1901. Everitt played for the Chicago Colts/Orphans and the Washington Senators.

In 698 games over seven seasons, Everitt posted a .317 batting average (902-for-2,842) with 535 runs, 11 home runs, 341 RBIs, 186 stolen bases and 212 bases on balls. He finished his career with a .946 fielding percentage.

== See also ==
- List of Major League Baseball career stolen bases leaders
