= Louie Heilbroner =

American baseball manager

- Manager
- Born: July 4, 1861; Fort Wayne, Indiana, U.S.
- Died: December 21, 1933 (aged 72); Fort Wayne, Indiana, U.S.
- Batted: Unknown Threw: Unknown

MLB statistics
- Games managed: 50
- Managerial record: 23–25
- Winning percentage: .479

Teams
- St. Louis Cardinals (1900)

Louis Wilbur Heilbroner (July 4, 1861 – December 21, 1933) was an American professional baseball secretary and business manager who managed the St. Louis Cardinals during the 1900 season.

In the middle of the season, Patsy Tebeau resigned as the Cardinals' manager and team president Frank Robison publicly offered the job to third baseman John McGraw, who declined despite his boss' insistence. Robinson then gave the manager title to Heilbroner who was serving as his secretary and who had no particular baseball qualifications. By many accounts, the diminutive Heilbroner (4'9 or 1,44m) never imposed his authority and McGraw was the de facto manager of the team and this was candidly acknowledged by the team owners. After managing the last 50 games in 1900, Heilbroner was replaced by Patsy Donovan at the start of 1901. During his short stint as manager, Heilbroner led the Cardinals to 23 wins, 25 losses and 2 ties. He remained with the team as a business manager until 1908 and later served a two-year term (1912–1914) as president of the Central League.

Heilbroner was also a pioneer in baseball statistics. In 1909, he founded Heilbroner's Baseball Bureau Service, the first commercial statistical bureau dedicated to baseball, and began publishing the Baseball Blue Book.

He died on December 21, 1933, in Fort Wayne, Indiana.
