= Jerry Nops =

American baseball player (1875–1937)

- Pitcher
- Born: June 23, 1875; Toledo, Ohio, U.S.
- Died: March 26, 1937 (aged 61); Camden, New Jersey, U.S.
- Batted: Left Threw: Left

MLB debut
- September 7, 1896, for the Philadelphia Phillies

Last MLB appearance
- September 23, 1901, for the Baltimore Orioles

MLB statistics
- Win–loss record: 72–41
- Earned run average: 3.70
- Strikeouts: 294
- Stats at Baseball Reference

Teams
- Philadelphia Phillies (1896); Baltimore Orioles (NL) (1896–1899); Brooklyn Superbas (1900); Baltimore Orioles (AL) (1901)

Jeremiah Henry Nops (June 23, 1875 – March 26, 1937) was an American left-handed pitcher in Major League Baseball. From 1896 to 1901, he played for the Philadelphia Phillies, Baltimore Orioles (NL), Brooklyn Superbas, and Baltimore Orioles (AL). He was 5 feet, 8 inches tall and weighed 168 pounds.

== Career ==
Nops was born in Toledo, Ohio, in 1875. He started his professional baseball career in 1895; that season, he went 12–21 with a 4.01 earned run average in the Western League. The following year, Nops moved on to the Atlantic League's Wilmington Peaches. Pitching 349.2 innings, he went 23–16 with a 2.08 ERA and had a league-leading 199 strikeouts. He then made four late-season starts in the National League and went 3–1.

From 1897 to 1899, Nops pitched for the Baltimore Orioles. He went 20–6 in 1897 and ranked second in the league in winning percentage (.769) and third in ERA (2.81). In 1898, he won 16 games and his ERA rose to 3.56, and in 1899, it went up again to 4.03.

Nops joined the Brooklyn Superbas in 1900 but appeared in just nine games for them. He jumped to the American League's Orioles for the 1901 season and went 12–10. That was his last year in the major leagues. He pitched in the minors from 1904 to 1908.

Nops died in Camden, New Jersey, in 1937.
