= Tom McCreery =

American baseball player (1874–1941)

- Outfielder
- Born: October 19, 1874; Beaver, Pennsylvania, U.S.
- Died: July 3, 1941 (aged 66); Beaver, Pennsylvania, U.S.
- Batted: Switch Threw: Right

MLB debut
- June 8, 1895, for the Louisville Colonels

Last MLB appearance
- September 27, 1903, for the Boston Beaneaters

MLB statistics
- Batting average: .289
- Home runs: 27
- Runs batted in: 388
- Earned run average: 6.32
- Stats at Baseball Reference

Teams
- Louisville Colonels (1895–1897); New York Giants (1897–1898); Pittsburgh Pirates (1898–1900); Brooklyn Superbas (1901–1903); Boston Beaneaters (1903)

Thomas Livingston McCreery (October 19, 1874 – July 3, 1941) was an American outfielder and pitcher in Major League Baseball. He played for the Louisville Colonels (1895–1897), New York Giants (1897–1898), Pittsburgh Pirates (1898–1900), Brooklyn Superbas (1901–1903) and Boston Beaneaters (1903). McCreery was a switch hitter and threw right-handed.

McCreery was born in Beaver, Pennsylvania, and debuted with the Louisville Colonels in 1895, primarily as a starting pitcher, and posted a 3–1 record with a shutout. In 1896 McCreery switched to outfield, and he responded with a .351 batting average, 65 runs batted in, 91 runs, 26 stolen bases, a .546 slugging percentage, and led the National League with 21 triples.

In 1897, McCreery posted career-highs in runs (91), stolen bases (28), RBI (67), games played (138), and hit .289. On July 12, he hit three inside-the-park home runs, becoming the second and, to date, final player in major-league history to hit three inside-homers in a single game (Guy Hecker was the first, having hit three on August 15, 1886). He also played in part of seven seasons with the New York Giants, Pittsburgh Pirates and Brooklyn Superbas, hitting .323 for Pittsburgh in 1899. He played his final major league game with the Boston Beaneaters in 1903.

In a nine-season career, McCreery was a .289 hitter with 27 home runs and 388 RBI in 802 games.

An alumnus of Georgetown University, McCreery served as the head coach of the University of Pittsburgh's baseball team in 1912. McCreery died in Beaver, Pennsylvania, at the age of 66.

== See also ==
- List of Major League Baseball annual triples leaders
