= Bob Allen (shortstop) =

American baseball player (1867–1943)

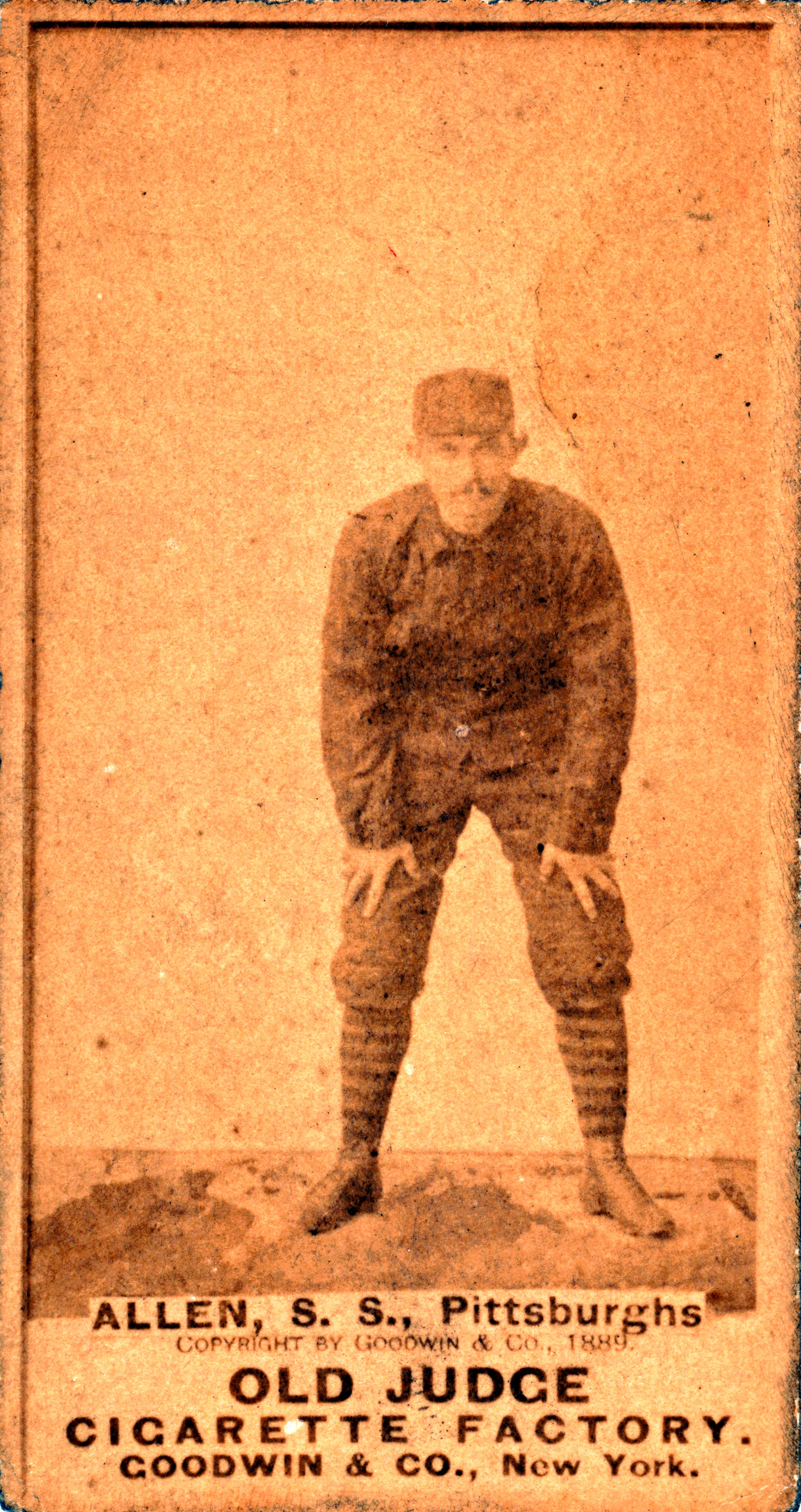
- Bob Allen in 1889
- Shortstop
- Born: July 10, 1867; Marion, Ohio, U.S.
- Died: May 14, 1943 (aged 75); Little Rock, Arkansas, U.S.
- Batted: Right Threw: Right

MLB debut
- April 19, 1890, for the Philadelphia Phillies

Last MLB appearance
- June 1, 1900, for the Cincinnati Reds

MLB statistics
- Batting average: .241
- Home runs: 14
- Runs batted in: 306
- Stats at Baseball Reference

Teams
- As player: Philadelphia Phillies (1890–1894); Boston Beaneaters (1897); Cincinnati Reds (1900); As manager: Philadelphia Phillies (1890); Detroit Tigers (1897); Cincinnati Reds (1900)

Robert Gilman Allen (July 10, 1867 – May 14, 1943) was an American shortstop for the Philadelphia Phillies, the Boston Beaneaters and the Cincinnati Reds, as well as a manager for two brief stints with the Phillies and Reds.

== Early life ==
He was born in Marion, Ohio, and played youth baseball with future president Warren G. Harding.

== Career ==
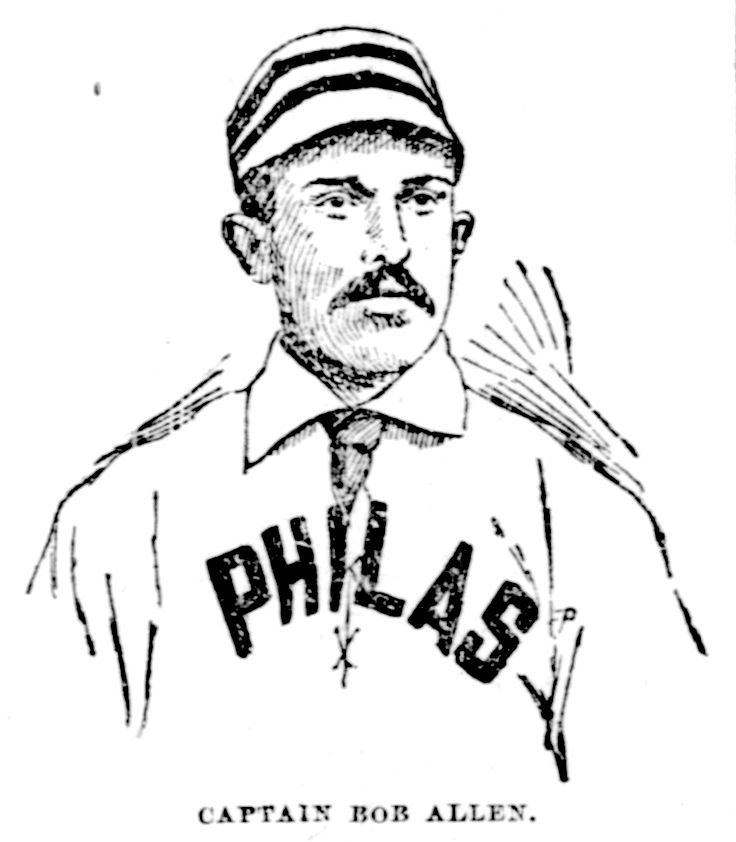
Captain Bob Allen, Philadelphia Phillies, Philadelphia Inquirer, 1893

Allen made his NL debut in 1890 with the Phillies, and in his day was considered a power hitter, hitting a career-high eight home runs in 1893. In 1894, he was struck in the face with a pitch, sustaining a broken cheekbone. The Chicago Tribune reported that cheekbone fragments had entered Allen's brain. The paper suggested that Allen had sustained permanent damage to his eyesight and his mind.

When Allen's contract was up, he took a three-year hiatus from baseball, but he later joined the Beaneaters. His playing time diminished and he walked away from baseball again after the 1897 season. In 1900, he was hired as manager of the Reds, occasionally inserting himself into the game as a shortstop. He finished 62–77 and in seventh place. He was fired after one season at the helm.

== Later life ==
He died in Little Rock, Arkansas, at age 75.

== See also ==
- List of Major League Baseball player–managers
