= Win Mercer =

American baseball player (1874–1903)

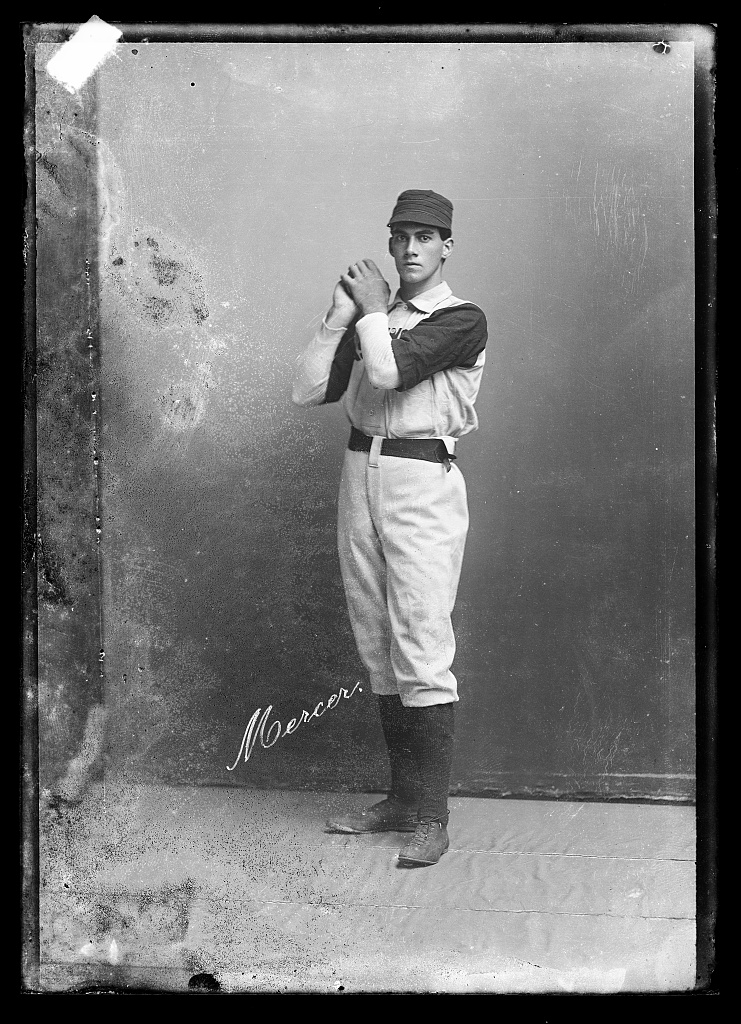
- Mercer photographed by C. M. Bell Studio
- Pitcher
- Born: June 20, 1874; Chester, West Virginia, U.S.
- Died: January 12, 1903 (aged 28); San Francisco, California, U.S.
- Batted: Right Threw: Right

MLB debut
- April 21, 1894, for the Washington Senators

Last MLB appearance
- September 27, 1902, for the Detroit Tigers

MLB statistics
- Win–loss record: 131–164
- Earned run average: 3.99
- Strikeouts: 528
- Stats at Baseball Reference

Teams
- Washington Senators (NL) (1894–1899); New York Giants (1900); Washington Senators (AL) (1901); Detroit Tigers (1902)

George Barclay "Win" Mercer (June 20, 1874 – January 12, 1903) was an American pitcher in Major League Baseball from 1894 to 1902. Born in Chester, West Virginia, he played primarily with the National League Washington Senators (1894–1899), winning 20 games twice with the club. He also played with the New York Giants (1900), the American League Washington Senators (1901), and the Detroit Tigers (1902). Mercer led the National League in games started (41), shutouts (3), and saves (3) in 1897. His career record of 251 complete games ranks No. 77 in Major League history.

Appointed player-manager of the Detroit Tigers for the 1903 season, Mercer's baseball career was terminated when he took his own life on January 13, 1903, in San Francisco.

== Washington Senators: 1894–1899 ==
Mercer spent the first seven years of his major league career, 1894–1899, with the Washington Senators. The Senators were one of the worst teams in baseball during Mercer's years with them. During Mercer's tenure, the Senators were 45–87 (1894); 43–85 (1895); 58–73 (1896); 61–71 (1897); 51–101 (1898) and 54–98 (1899).

While Mercer's career record is 131–164, these figures do not reflect Mercer's talents. In Mercer's rookie season, 1894, he pitched 336 1/3 innings and had 29 complete games at age 20. His ERA of 3.85 was third best in the National League. Yet, his win–loss record for the hapless Senators was 17–23. In 1896, Mercer managed to win 25 games (5th best in the National League) despite playing for a losing team. If Mercer's decisions were removed from the Senators’ 1896 season, they would have finished 23–55 – a .294 winning percentage.

A game played on August 31, 1896, demonstrates how difficult it was for Mercer to secure wins for the Senators. On that day, Mercer shut out Chicago for 11 innings, but the Senators also failed to score a run against opposing pitcher Cy Young. The Senators finally scored a run in the 11th inning to give Mercer the win, but Mercer lacked the support to achieve the win totals he could have secured on a better hitting team.

== Ladies' Day Riot of 1897 ==
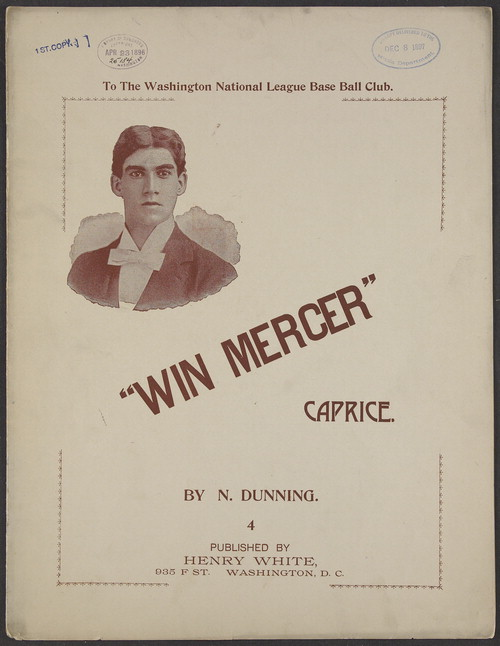
Win Mercer Sheet Music

Mercer was a fan favorite in Washington and was described by contemporary accounts as good-looking. His popularity extended beyond his performance on the field; a local musician wrote "The Win Mercer Caprice" in his honor, which was sometimes performed at games. Washington regularly held Ladies' Days, normally on Tuesdays and Fridays, during which female fans were admitted to the ballpark free of charge.

A September 13, 1897, Ladies' Day game against the Cincinnati Reds later became the subject of a frequently repeated baseball legend. Mercer was ejected in the third inning after objecting to umpire Bill Carpenter's ball-and-strike calls, producing a pair of eyeglasses and attempting to place them on Carpenter.

The famous legend goes that following Mercers ejection the women at ladies night responded with fury and began to rip out seats, bent railings, and broke windows. The police were called to break up the riot and the umpire, who feared for his life, was smuggled out of the ballpark in disguise. It was decades before Washington held another Ladies' Day.1

Research published by the Society for American Baseball Research in 2025 found that contemporary newspaper accounts do not support the famous legend. Reports of the game did not describe any unusual crowd reaction to Mercer's ejection. Instead, spectators became angry later in the game after several disputed seventh-inning calls by Carpenter contributed to Cincinnati tying the score. After Washington lost 2–1, a group of female fans waited near Carpenter's exit from the field "with drawn parasols and upraised fans." Carpenter was struck or threatened with objects the women were carrying, and one woman reportedly attempted to hit him with her fist. Some women also poked Cincinnati players with their parasols as they left the field. Contemporary accounts reported no property damage, torn clothing, or police intervention nor were there any contemporary mentions for a riot.

The legend of the "Ladies' Day Riot" appears to have developed decades afterward. SABR researcher Gary Belleville found the earliest book account of the supposed riot in Mac Davis's 1953 Lore and Legends of Baseball, more than half a century after the game; versions of the story were subsequently repeated in many other books and articles as well.

== Talents as a batter ==
Mercer also proved himself to be a solid hitter with the Senators. He hit .291 in his rookie season with 29 runs, 29 RBIs, 9 extra base hits, and 9 stolen bases. After Mercer hit .317 in 1897, the Senators began using him as a position player starting in 1898 on days when he wasn’t pitching. As a result, Mercer played at every position except catcher in his career, including 90 games at 3rd base, 75 games in the outfield, 39 games at shortstop, 8 games at first base, and 5 at 2nd base. With increased at bats in 1898, Mercer batted .321 with a .369 on-base percentage. The rest of the Senators’ team batted .271 for the 1898 season – 50 points lower than Mercer. And in 1899, he hit .299 and achieved career highs with 73 runs, 35 RBIs, 112 hits, and 16 stolen bases.

== New York Giants: 1900 ==
On January 10, 1900, the New York Giants purchased Mercer from Washington. Mercer had the misfortune of playing for the Giants in a year when they finished 18 games under .500 and in 8th place. Mercer finished the 1900 season with a 13–17 record and a 3.86 ERA

== American League: 1901–1902 ==
Before the 1901 season, Mercer jumped to the newly formed American League. He played the 1901 season with the new American League Washington Senators. The team finished 11 games under .500 and in 6th place. Mercer was 9–13 as a pitcher, but batted .300 with 10 steals. On August 8, 1901, Mercer stole home against the Athletics, becoming the first American League pitcher to accomplish the feat.

Mercer played for the Detroit Tigers in 1902 and had one of his best seasons. Though he had eight major league seasons behind him, Mercer was only 27 years old at the start of the 1902 season. He started 33 games for the Tigers and had 28 complete games. His ERA of 3.04 was the best of his career. His four shutouts in 1902 were second in the American League to Addie Joss.

== Death ==
After the conclusion of the 1902 season, the Tigers appointed the 28-year-old Mercer to be their player-manager for 1903. However, on January 12, 1903, after a barnstorming tour through the west, Mercer checked into the Occidental Hotel in San Francisco and killed himself by inhaling illuminating gas at age 28. Mercer's suicide gained national attention, and there were conflicting reports about the reasons for the suicide. The Sporting News reported that Mercer had been gambling and apparently saw no way to make the deficit good. According to this version, his losses included not only his own money but the funds of other players, with estimates ranging from $3,000 to $8,000. Another report rejected the idea of gambling debts and blamed the suicide on a relationship with a woman. Some reports indicated that Mercer left a suicide note warning of the evils of women and gambling. There is no known substantiation for these reports, and The New York Times reported on Mercer's death as follows: "[Mercer] registered at the Occidental Hotel last evening. He was found asphyxiated in his room to-day. Mercer registered under the name George Murray and gave his residence as Philadelphia. The watchman of the hotel in making his rounds detected the odor of gas coming from Mercer's room and broke down the door. Mercer was on the bed with his coat and waistcoat covering his head; and a tube ran from the gas jet into his mouth. Among the papers found in the room was one which read: 'Tell Mr. Van Horn of the Langham Hotel that Winnie Mercer has taken his life.' Mercer was a sufferer of pulmonary troubles, and as the disease refused to yield to treatment he became despondent. He left a statement of his financial accounts, showing that he owed no money. He was twenty-eight years old...."

Mercer was laid to rest at Riverview Cemetery in East Liverpool, Ohio.

== See also ==
- List of Major League Baseball annual saves leaders
- List of Major League Baseball career hit batsmen leaders
- List of baseball players who died during their careers
