= Frank Kitson (baseball) =

American baseball player (1869–1930)

- Pitcher
- Born: September 11, 1869; Hopkins, Michigan, U.S.
- Died: April 14, 1930 (aged 60); Allegan, Michigan, U.S.
- Batted: Left Threw: Right

MLB debut
- May 19, 1898, for the Baltimore Orioles

Last MLB appearance
- July 22, 1907, for the New York Highlanders

MLB statistics
- Win–loss record: 128–117
- Earned run average: 3.18
- Strikeouts: 729
- Stats at Baseball Reference

Teams
- Baltimore Orioles (1898–1899); Brooklyn Superbas (1900–1902); Detroit Tigers (1903–1905); Washington Senators (1906–1907); New York Highlanders (1907)

Career highlights and awards
- National League pennant (1900)

Frank R. Kitson (September 11, 1869 – April 14, 1930) was an American baseball pitcher.

A native of Michigan, Kitson played 10 seasons in Major League Baseball with the Baltimore Orioles (1898–1899), Brooklyn Superbas (1900–1902), Detroit Tigers (1903–1905), Washington Senators (1906–1907), and New York Highlanders (1907).

Kitson helped lead the 1900 Brooklyn Superbas to the National League pennant. He had 22 wins in 1899 and won at least 15 games five consecutive years from 1899 to 1903. He compiled a career record of 128–117 with a 3.18 earned run average (ERA) and 729 strikeouts. He appeared in 304 games and threw 211 complete games.

== Early years ==
Kitson was born in 1869 at Hopkins, Michigan.

== Professional baseball player ==
=== Minor leagues ===
The first record of Kitson's professional baseball career is in 1895 when he played for the Grand Rapids Gold Bugs in the Western League. He played in the Virginia League in 1896 and then in 1897 for the Burlington Colts of the Western Association. He compiled a 14–17 record for Burlington.

=== Baltimore and Brooklyn ===
In August 1897, the Baltimore Orioles purchased Kitson from Burlington. Ned Hanlon, manager of the Orioles, later recalled that he arranged the purchase of Kitson without having seen him. Interviewed in 1900, Hanlon recalled: "I'll never take another man without first seeing him work. It took over a year to teach Kitson to earn the $500 that we gave for him, but it cost me enough worry to last a lifetime. He is now one of the best pitchers in the league, but when I got him he couldn't pitch a little bit, and as for fielding his position, that was out of the question."

Kitson's major league career got off to a roller coaster start in Baltimore. In his first start on May 19, 1898, he shut out the Pittsburgh Pirates. Six days later, the Cubs scored 20 runs off him; the game was called after seven innings with the Cubs ahead 20–4. In his second season in Baltimore, Kitson appeared in 40 games and compiled a 22-16 record in 326 2/3 innings pitched. He ranked among the National League leaders with a 2.77 ERA (sixth), 22 wins (10th), and 34 complete games (10th). Kitson also contributed with a .314 batting average, three triples, and 16 RBIs.

The Orioles folded after the 1899 season, and a number of players, including Kitson, were transferred the Brooklyn Superbas. He was a key player for the 1900 Brooklyn team that compiled an 82-54 to win the National League pennant. He appeared in 40 games in 1900, compiling a 15-13 record with a 4.19 ERA in 253 innings pitched. He also helped his cause with a .294 batting average.

He improved in 1901, compiling a 19-11 record with a 2.98 ERA in 38 games pitched. He also led the National League with four saves. On July 25, he pitched a one-hitter against Christy Mathewson and the New York Giants, and The Brookly Daily Eagle reported that Kitson's "speed, curves and command was perfect and the Giants were helpless in his hands."

In 1902, Kitson again won 19 games for Brooklyn, compiling a 19-13 record with a 2.85 ERA in 32 games pitched. He ranked among the National League's leaders with 19 wins (eighth), 109 strikeouts (ninth), and 29 complete games (10th).

=== Detroit Tigers ===
On October 25, 1902, he left Brooklyn to sign with the Detroit Tigers in the American League. In his first season in Detroit, he compiled a 15-16 record with a career-best 2.58 ERA. He remained with the Tigers for two more seasons, compiling a 9-13 record, 3.07 ERA in 1904, and a 12-14 record, 3.47 ERA in 1905.

=== Washington and New York ===
On December 5, 1905, the Tigers traded Kitson to the Washington Senators in exchange for Happy Townsend. He compiled a 6-14 record and 3.65 for the Senators in 1906. He began the 1907 with the Senators and lost his first three decisions with a 3.94 ERA.

On May 30, 1907, the Senators sold Kitson to the New York Highlanders. He compiled a 4-0 record for the Highlanders with a 3.00 ERA. He pitched his final major league game on July 22, 1907.

In 249 major league games, Kitson posted a 128–117 record with a 3.18 ERA. He also compiled a respectable .240 batting average (235-for-979) with 4 home runs and 95 RBI.

== Later years ==
Kitson died in April 1930 at his farm located two-and-a-half miles north of Allegan, Michigan. He had been suffering from a heart ailment for several years before his death. He was interred in Hudson Corners Cemetery.
