= 1900 in baseball =

The following are the baseball events of the year 1900 throughout the world.

== Champions ==
- Chronicle-Telegraph Cup: Brooklyn Superbas over Pittsburgh Pirates (3–1)
- National League: Brooklyn Superbas

== Statistical leaders ==
National League
Stat	Player	Total
AVG	Honus Wagner (PIT)	.381
HR	Herman Long (BSN)	12
RBI	Elmer Flick (PHI)	110
W	Joe McGinnity (BRO)	28
ERA	Rube Waddell (PIT)	2.37
K	Noodles Hahn (CIN)	132

== National League final standings ==
National League
Team	W	L	Pct.	GB	Home	Road
Brooklyn Superbas	82	54	.603	—	43‍–‍26	39‍–‍28
Pittsburgh Pirates	79	60	.568	4½	42‍–‍28	37‍–‍32
Philadelphia Phillies	75	63	.543	8	45‍–‍23	30‍–‍40
Boston Beaneaters	66	72	.478	17	42‍–‍29	24‍–‍43
St. Louis Cardinals	65	75	.464	19	40‍–‍31	25‍–‍44
Chicago Orphans	65	75	.464	19	45‍–‍30	20‍–‍45
Cincinnati Reds	62	77	.446	21½	27‍–‍34	35‍–‍43
New York Giants	60	78	.435	23	38‍–‍31	22‍–‍47

Locations of teams for the 1900–1901 National League seasons
National League

== Events ==
- January 10 – The New York Giants purchased the contract of Win Mercer from the Washington Senators.
- January 19 – Boston Beaneaters catcher Marty Bergen, reportedly depressed by his son's death in 1898, allegedly kills his family with an ax and then commits suicide in Brookfield, Massachusetts.
- February 17 – Due to unpaid alimony, Mary H. Vanderbeck takes possession of the American League franchise in Detroit. Her ex-husband, George Vanderbeck, will later regain control of the team.
- March 8 – The National League decides to downsize to eight teams for the upcoming season by eliminating the circuit's franchises in Baltimore, Cleveland, Louisville, and Washington.
- March 9 – Infielders John O'Brien, Art Madison, George Fox, and pitcher Jack Chesbro are transferred from the defunct Louisville Colonels franchise to the Pittsburgh Pirates.
- March 10 – The Brooklyn Superbas sell the contracts of John McGraw, Wilbert Robinson and Bill Keister to the St. Louis Cardinals.
- March 27 – The Cincinnati Reds sell the contract of Kip Selbach to the New York Giants.
- April 19 – In Boston, the Phillies win 19–17 in the NL's highest scoring opening day game. Boston tied the game with 9 runs in the ninth. Philadelphia, once up 16–4, scores 2 in the 10th for the win.
- May 5 – The Orphans' Jimmy Ryan hits his 20th career leadoff homer against the visiting Cincinnati Reds and Noodles Hahn. Chicago wins 4–3.
- June 5 – Pirates' first baseman Duff Cooley has only two putouts in a 6–5 loss to the Phillies
- June 19 – Clark Griffith and Rube Waddell have a duel for the ages. Each throw 13 shut out innings before Griffith hits a walk off double in the 14th.
- June 21 – Citing the Superbas' poor attendance at Brooklyn's Washington Park, National League president Ned Young discusses the possibility of moving the franchise to Washington, D.C. The reigning NL champions, en route to their second consecutive title, are averaging only a thousand fans on non-holiday dates.
- June 22 – Umpire Hank O'Day forfeits the game to the Brooklyn Superbas when the Philadelphia Phillies stall in the bottom of the 11th inning, hoping the delay postpones the game due to darkness. Brooklyn had scored seven runs in the top of the frame to pull ahead 20–13.
- July 4 – At the West Side Grounds, about 1,000 of the 10,000 fans at the game fire pistols to celebrate July 4. No injuries were reported. Meanwhile, Chicago beats Philadelphia, 5–4, in 12 innings.
- July 7 – Kid Nichols of the Boston Beaneaters records his 300th career win.
- July 12 – Noodles Hahn pitches a no-hitter for the Cincinnati Reds against the Philadelphia Phillies. The Reds win, 4–0.
- July 13 – The Phillies' third baseman, Harry Wolverton, has 3 triples among his 5 hits in a 23–8 win over the Pirates.
- July 17 – The Giants' Christy Mathewson, acquired from Norfolk of the North Carolina League, makes his major league debut, relieving in the 5th inning against Brooklyn at Washington Park with the score tied, 5–5. The results are less than glowing: 2 walks, 3 hit batters, 5 runs. Ed Doheny relieves Mathewson after 4; the Superbas win the game, 13–7.
- July 26 – In Brooklyn, a sheriff seizes the St. Louis Cardinals share of the gate receipts in order to pay former Cardinals pitcher Gus Weyhing, who'd claimed the Cardinals had not paid him for his services before releasing him. Weyhing would later sign with Brooklyn as a free agent.
- August 17 – Reds pitcher Bill Phillips punches Phillies hitter Roy Thomas after Thomas fouled off 12 straight pitches. Phillips is ejected, but the Reds win in extra innings.
- August 19 – After being promised by manager Connie Mack that he could take the next few days off, Rube Waddell pitches both games in a double header for Milwaukee of the Western League. In game one, Waddell threw for 17 innings, and followed that up by taking a one hitter into the fifth inning of the second game, in total, Waddell pitched 22 innings worth of baseball in one day.
- August 22 – The Chicago Orphans acquire catcher Roger Bresnahan, only to release him after he appeared in two games. Bresnahan would go on to have a hall of fame career catching for the New York Giants.
- September 11 Catcher Johnny Kling makes his MLB debut for the Chicago Orphans. Kling doesn't get a hit in his debut, but he'd go on to be the Orphans (later re-named the Cubs) starting catcher for the next several seasons.
- September 17 – Tommy Corcoran leaves his shortstop position and begins digging around the third base coaching box with his spikes. The Reds' captain uncovers a metal box with an electrical device inside with attached wires which is most likely being used by the Phillies in a sophisticated scheme to steal signs.
- December 15 – The Cincinnati Reds trade pitcher Christy Mathewson to the New York Giants for pitcher Amos Rusie, who hadn't pitched in a game since 1898. This trade becomes one of the first ever "flops": Mathewson goes on to a Hall of Fame career with the Giants, while Rusie doesn't even last a full season in Cincinnati.

== Births ==
=== January ===
- January 1 – Teddy Kearns
- January 1 – Al Stokes
- January 6 – Clyde Beck
- January 7 – John Beckwith
- January 7 – Johnny Grabowski
- January 7 – Carlton Lord
- January 9 – Frank Barnes
- January 11 – Lefty Taber
- January 16 – Joe Rabbitt
- January 21 – Willie Ludolph
- January 26 – Lefty Jamerson
- January 28 – Emil Yde
- January 31 – Honey Barnes

=== February ===
- February 2 – Willie Kamm
- February 2 – Frank Mack
- February 7 – Bill Riggins
- February 9 – Tom Gee
- February 15 – George Earnshaw
- February 19 – John Kane
- February 19 – Oscar Roettger
- February 20 – Al Williamson
- February 22 – Roy Spencer
- February 25 – Joe Burns
- February 25 – John Gillespie
- February 28 – Doc Wood

=== March ===
- March 6 – Lefty Grove
- March 9 – Bill Narleski
- March 11 – Rusty Pence
- March 14 – Marty McManus
- March 22 – Grady Orange
- March 25 – Russ Miller
- March 29 – Red Schillings
- March 31 – Mule Suttles

=== April ===
- April 4 – Jule Mallonee
- April 6 – Joe Wyatt
- April 11 – John Middleton
- April 12 – Mickey O'Neil
- April 13 – Rufe Clarke
- April 16 – Walt Schulz
- April 22 – Paul Florence
- April 23 – Jim Bottomley
- April 23 – Joe Kelly
- April 25 – Jake Freeze
- April 26 – Hack Wilson

=== May ===
- May 12 – Phil Voyles
- May 20 – Claral Gillenwater
- May 20 – George Grantham
- May 20 – Ollie Klee
- May 21 – Sam Langford
- May 22 – Hooks Cotter
- May 23 – Duke Brett
- May 24 – Wally Shaner
- May 24 – Al Shealy
- May 24 – Clay Van Alstyne
- May 28 – Bill Barrett
- May 30 – Jute Bell

=== June ===
- June 1 – Dutch Schesler
- June 3 – Harry Baldwin
- June 4 – George Watkins
- June 5 – John Cavanaugh
- June 7 – Ed Wells
- June 9 – Marty Callaghan
- June 10 – Garland Braxton
- June 10 – Lefty Wolf
- June 12 – Charlie Barnabe
- June 13 – Chief Youngblood
- June 21 – Red Barron
- June 22 – Joe Poetz
- June 23 – Bill Harris
- June 26 – Lum Davenport
- June 26 – Elmer Yoter

=== July ===
- July 1 – Louis Brower
- July 1 – Mel Simons
- July 2 – Joe Bennett
- July 2 – Ernie Vick
- July 3 – Joe Brown
- July 4 – Dot Fulghum
- July 4 – Wes Kingdon
- July 12 – Rudy Miller
- July 13 – Footsie Blair
- July 14 – Dave Harris
- July 20 – Hunter Lane
- July 23 – Jimmie Wilson
- July 24 – Jim Lyle
- July 30 – Paul Fitzke
- July 31 – Heinie Scheer

=== August ===
- August 12 – Spence Harris
- August 16 – Billy Rhiel
- August 17 – Elmer Pence

=== September ===
- September 1 – Hub Pruett
- September 2 – Joe Heving
- September 5 – Ike Kamp
- September 5 – Merv Shea
- September 15 – Bud Clancy
- September 15 – Roy Meeker
- September 17 – Hughie Critz
- September 17 – Roy Luebbe
- September 17 – Sam Streeter
- September 19 – Jim Wright
- September 21 – John Bogart
- September 22 – Bud Heine
- September 23 – Lefty Stewart

=== October ===
- October 3 – Red Dorman
- October 9 – Freddy Spurgeon
- October 13 – Heinie Odom
- October 16 – Nick Cullop
- October 16 – Goose Goslin
- October 17 – Ernie Wingard
- October 19 – Herb Welch
- October 20 – Jimmy Uchrinscko
- October 22 – Bill Bishop
- October 22 – Jumbo Elliott
- October 24 – Ossie Bluege
- October 27 – Red Proctor
- October 28 – Johnny Neun
- October 31 – Cal Hubbard

=== November ===
- November 5 – Pete Donohue
- November 11 – Boob Fowler
- November 12 – Herm Merritt
- November 17 – Ossie Orwoll
- November 18 – Jim Marquis
- November 18 – Vince Shields
- November 26 – John Churry

=== December ===
- December 1 – Eppie Barnes
- December 1 – Mike Cvengros
- December 8 – Mose Solomon
- December 10 – Roy Carlyle
- December 14 – Harry Wilke
- December 16 – Tony Kaufmann
- December 17 – Karl Swanson
- December 19 – Wally Gilbert
- December 19 – Tex Jeanes
- December 20 – Gabby Hartnett
- December 21 – Doc Hamann
- December 23 – Danny Taylor
- December 28 – Ted Lyons
- December 31 – Syl Johnson

== Deaths ==
- January 9 – Henry Kessler, 53, shortstop who hit .253 for the Brooklyn Atlantics and Cincinnati Reds from 1873 to 1877.
- January 19 – Marty Bergen, 28, catcher for the Boston Beaneaters since 1896 who batted .280 for the 1898 championship team
- January 21 – Jim Rogers, 27, played two seasons and managed one from 1896 to 1897.
- February 7 – "Brewery Jack" Taylor, 26, pitcher for the Cincinnati Reds (among others), who had three 20-win seasons from 1894–'96, and led the National League in games and innings in the 1898 season.
- February 23 – Nate Berkenstock, 69[?], played right field for one game with the 1871 Philadelphia Athletics.
- March 31 – Foghorn Bradley, 44, pitcher for the 1876 Boston Red Caps who went on to umpire for six major league seasons.
- April 28 – Walter Plock, 30, center fielder for the 1891 Philadelphia Phillies.
- May 14 – Billy Taylor, 45[?], player for seven seasons, mostly as a pitcher and outfielder, from 1881 to 1887.
- May 15 – John Traffley, 38[?], right fielder who appeared in two games with the 1889 Louisville Colonels.
- May 31 – Tom Patterson, 55[?], outfielder for four seasons in the National Association.
- June 1 – Charlie Gray, 36[?], pitcher who went 1–4 for the 1890 Pittsburgh Alleghenys.
- June 12 – Mox McQuery, 38, first baseman who hit .271 with 13 home runs and 160 RBI in 417 games, and the National League in putouts in 1886.
- June 13 – Frank Fleet, 52[?], utility player for five seasons in the National Association.
- July 15 – Billy Barnie, 47, manager of the Orioles from 1883 to 1891, and later of three other teams; pilot of Hartford team in Eastern League since 1899.
- July 22 – Harry Jacoby, [?], infielder/outfielder for two seasons with the Baltimore Orioles of the American Association.
- July 24 – Fred Zahner, 30, backup catcher who hit .214 with the Louisville Colonels from 1894 to 1895.
- August 24 – John Puhl, 24, third baseman who played briefly for the New York Giants in 1898 and 1899.
- September 14 – Ed Knouff, 33, pitcher/outfielder who posted a 20–20 record and hit a .187 average in the American Association from 1885 to 1889.
- October 7 – Bill Phillips, 43, first baseman for Cleveland and Brooklyn who was the first Canadian in the major leagues; batted. 302 in 1885.
- October 9 – Harry Wheeler, 42, pitcher and outfielder for eight different teams between 1878 and 1884.
- December 14 – Jim Devlin, 34, pitcher who posted an 11–10 record with a 3.38 ERA for the New York Giants, Philadelphia Quakers and St. Louis Browns from 1886 to 1889.
