= 1939 Baseball Hall of Fame balloting =

Elections to the Baseball Hall of Fame

National Baseball

Hall of Fame and Museum
- New inductees: 10
- via BBWAA: 3
- via Special Election: 1
- via Old Timers Committee: 6
- Total inductees: 26
- Induction date: June 12, 1939

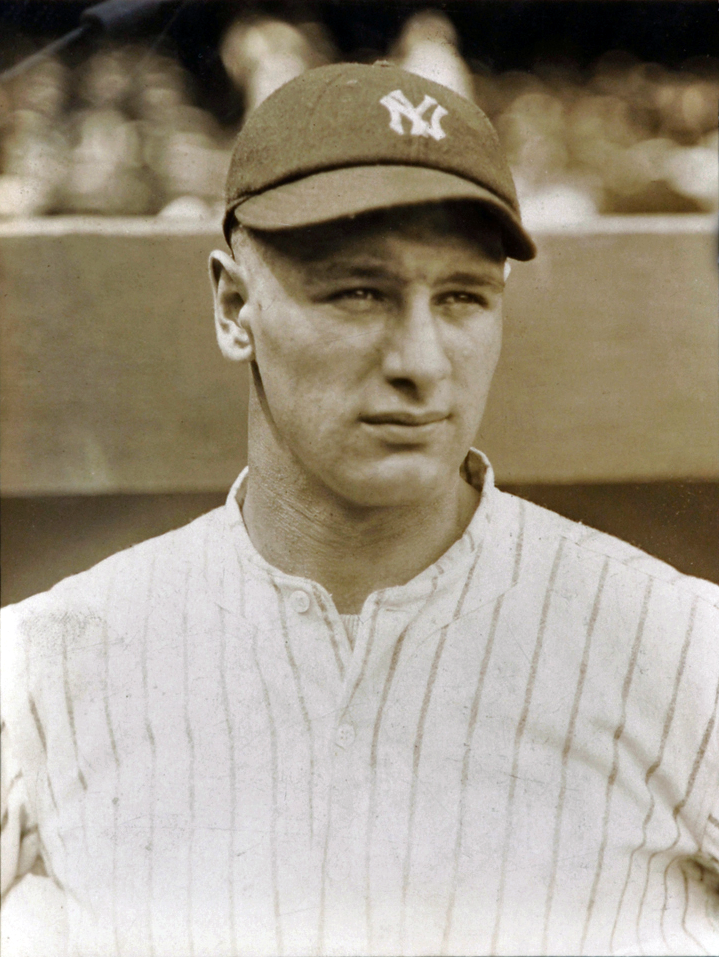
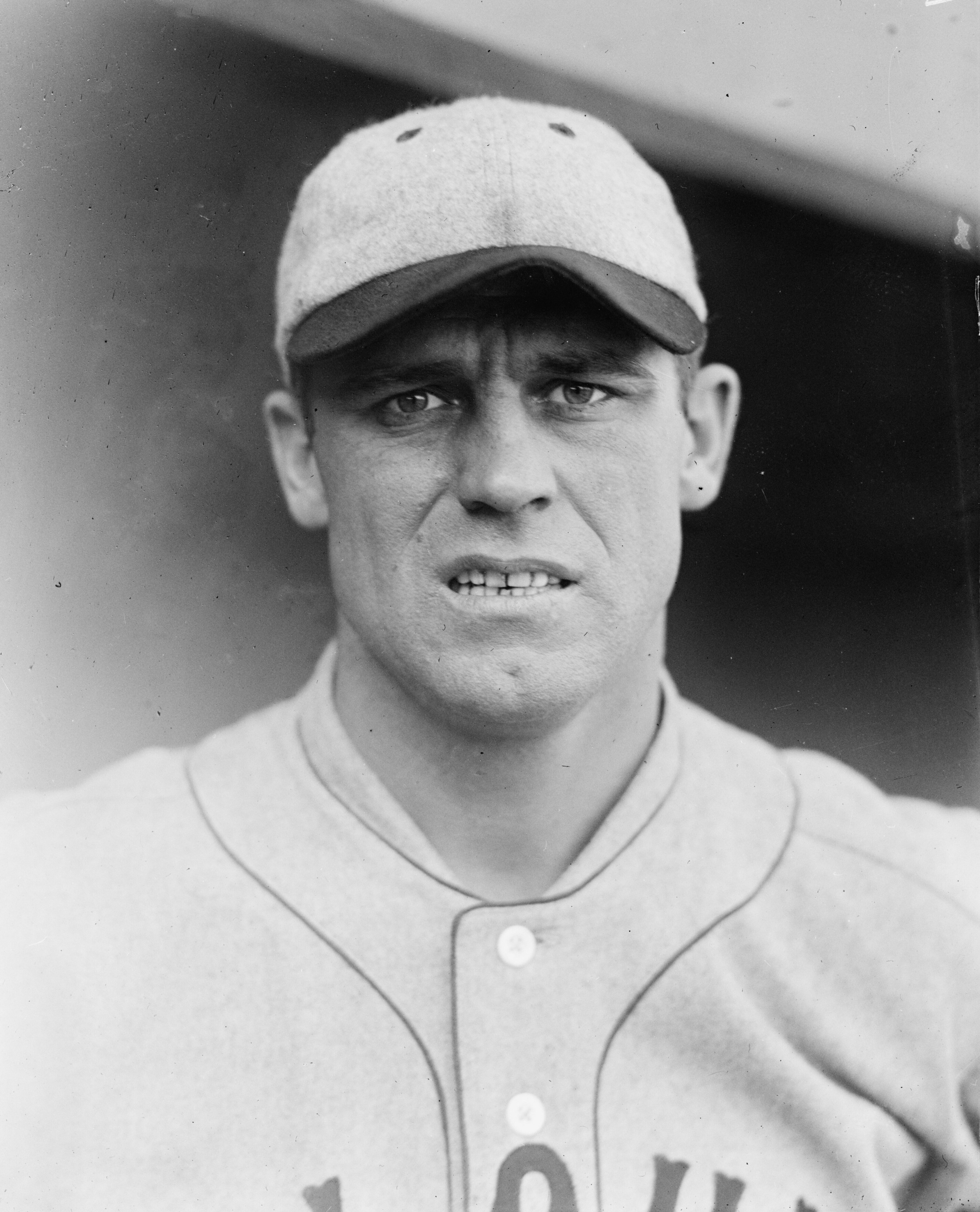
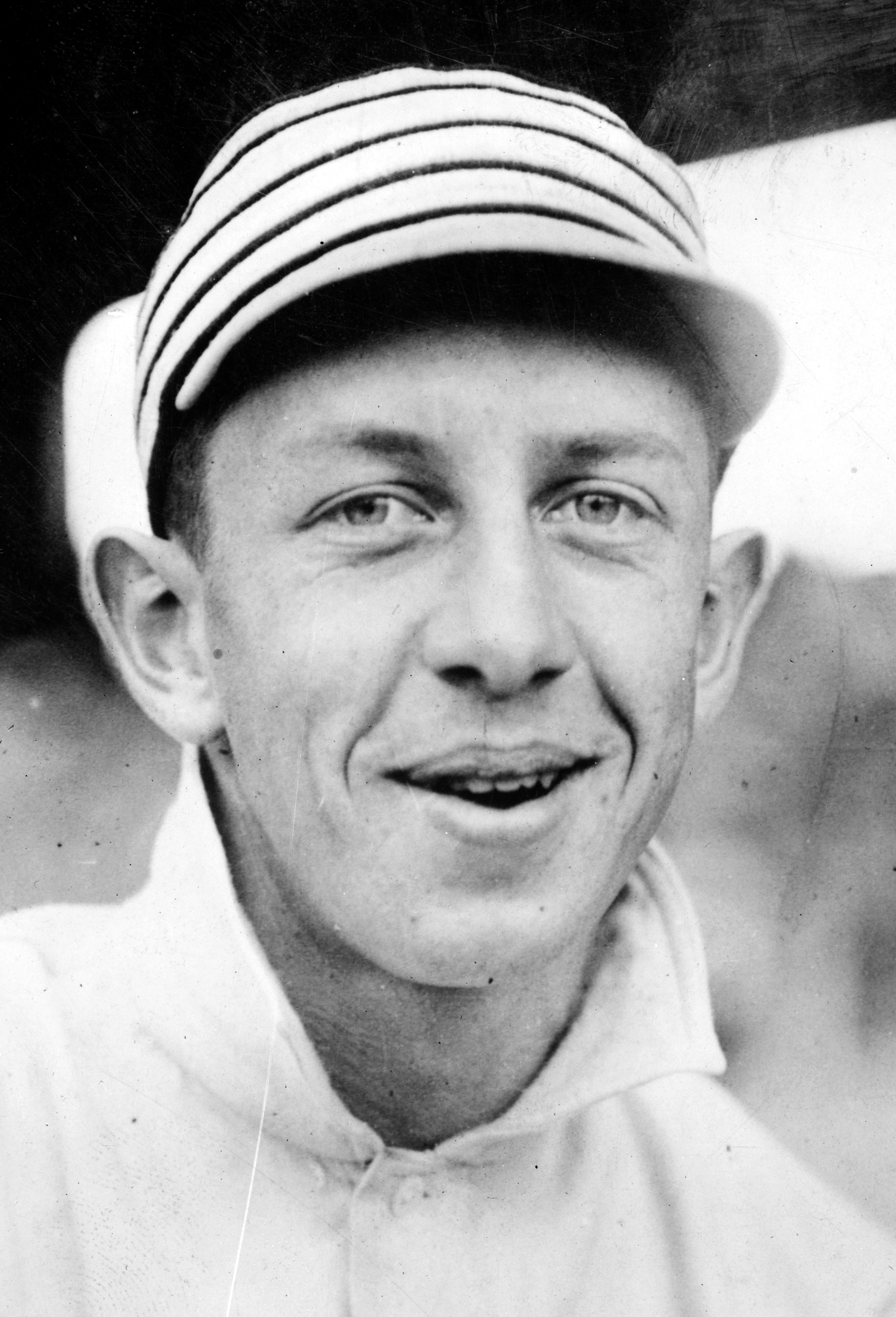
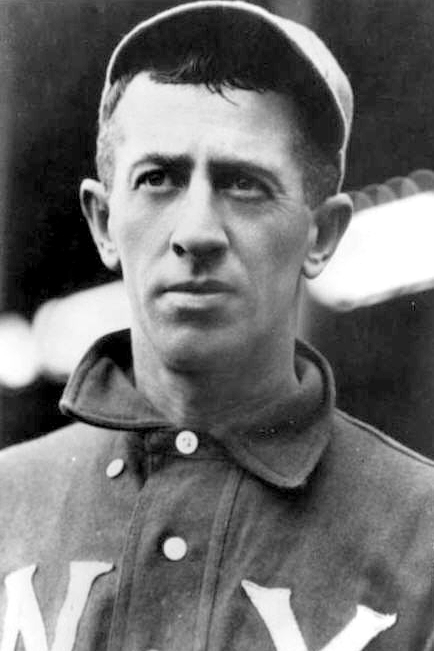
1939 BBWAA inductees (L-R): Lou Gehrig, George Sisler, Eddie Collins, and Willie Keeler

The 1939 elections to select inductees to the Baseball Hall of Fame were the last ones conducted prior to the Hall's opening that year. Needing just one addition to complete the initial goal of 10 inductees from the 20th century, members of the Baseball Writers' Association of America (BBWAA) were once again given authority to select any players active in the 20th century, excepting active players. Difficulties in convening the Centennial Commission of the previous two years led to an even smaller Old-Timers Committee selecting inductees from the 19th century – a cause of particular urgency to many who had been anticipating the five promised but unfulfilled selections in that area for over three years.

In the BBWAA election, voters were instructed to cast votes for 10 candidates; any candidate receiving votes on at least 75% of the ballots would be honored with induction to the Hall upon its opening in Cooperstown, New York, on June 12 of that year. After the Hall's opening, a special election was also held in December. Because the initial goal for the Hall's opening of selecting 10 players from the 20th century had now been met, it was further decided to delay the next election until 1942, even though observers widely believed that electing three players per year (12 had been elected in four regular BBWAA elections) had turned out to be an ideal rate.

== BBWAA regular election ==
A total of 274 ballots were cast, with 2,710 individual votes for 108 specific candidates, an average of 9.89 per ballot; 206 votes were required for election. Although three stars of the 1920s did very well, the balloting was otherwise dominated by players of the 1900s and 1910s, who many voters felt should be given priority. Players who had been retired over 20 years received 60% of the votes, and accounted for 14 of the top 20 in the balloting. Due to frustration over the fact that no 19th century players had yet been selected, a number of players from that era whose careers extended into the 20th century only briefly (or not at all) even received some votes, as did some managers. The results were announced in January 1939. The three candidates who received at least 75% of the vote and were elected are indicated in bold italics; candidates who have since been selected in subsequent elections are indicated in italics:

Key to colors
| Elected to the Hall. These individuals are also indicated in **bold italics**. |
| Players who were elected in future elections. These individuals are also indicated in plain italics. |

| Players | Votes | Percent | Change |
|---|---|---|---|
| **George Sisler** | 235 | 85.8 | ▲17.5% |
| **Eddie Collins** | 213 | 77.7 | ▲10.9% |
| **Willie Keeler** | 207 | 75.5 | ▲7.9% |
| Rube Waddell | 179 | 65.3 | ▲8.8% |
| Rogers Hornsby | 176 | 64.2 | ▲46.6% |
| Frank Chance | 158 | 57.7 | ▲6.9% |
| Ed Delahanty | 145 | 52.9 | ▲2.5% |
| Ed Walsh | 132 | 48.2 | ▲6.2% |
| Johnny Evers | 107 | 39.1 | ▲4.4% |
| Miller Huggins | 97 | 35.4 | ▲17.1% |
| Rabbit Maranville | 82 | 29.9 | ▲2.0% |
| Jimmy Collins | 72 | 26.3 | ▼3.9% |
| Roger Bresnahan | 67 | 24.5 | ▼1.1% |
| Fred Clarke | 59 | 21.5 | ▼2.5% |
| Mordecai Brown | 54 | 19.7 | ▼0.9% |
| Wilbert Robinson | 46 | 16.8 | ▼10.3% |
| Chief Bender | 40 | 14.6 | ▼2.0% |
| Herb Pennock | 40 | 14.6 | ▲0.5% |
| Ray Schalk | 35 | 12.8 | ▼4.4% |
| Hugh Duffy | 34 | 12.4 | ▲3.2% |
| Ross Youngs | 34 | 12.4 | ▼2.9% |
| Hughie Jennings | 33 | 12.0 | ▲3.2% |
| Joe McGinnity | 32 | 11.7 | ▼2.0% |
| Frank Baker | 30 | 10.9 | ▼1.3% |
| Mickey Cochrane | 28 | 10.2 | - |
| Addie Joss | 28 | 10.2 | ▲3.3% |
| Eddie Plank | 28 | 10.2 | ▼4.3% |
| Frankie Frisch | 26 | 9.5 | - |
| Clark Griffith | 20 | 7.3 | ▲3.5% |
| Bill Terry | 16 | 5.8 | ▲3.1% |
| Dazzy Vance | 15 | 5.5 | ▲1.7% |
| Johnny Kling | 14 | 5.1 | ▼4.8% |
| Nap Rucker | 13 | 4.7 | ▲0.1% |
| Joe Tinker | 12 | 4.4 | ▼1.7% |
| Babe Adams | 11 | 4.0 | ▼0.2% |
| Pie Traynor | 10 | 3.6 | ▲2.5% |
| Harry Heilmann | 8 | 2.9 | ▼2.4% |
| Edd Roush | 8 | 2.9 | ▼0.5% |
| Max Carey | 7 | 2.6 | ▲0.3% |
| Bill Dinneen | 7 | 2.6 | ▲1.1% |
| Kid Nichols | 7 | 2.6 | ▲1.5% |
| Nick Altrock | 6 | 2.2 | ▼0.5% |
| Jack Chesbro | 6 | 2.2 | ▲1.4% |
| Sam Crawford | 6 | 2.2 | ▼2.0% |
| Duffy Lewis | 6 | 2.2 | ▲0.3% |
| Amos Rusie | 6 | 2.2 | ▼0.9% |
| Casey Stengel | 6 | 2.2 | ▲1.4% |
| Mike Donlin | 5 | 1.8 | ▼0.1% |
| Harry Hooper | 5 | 1.8 | ▲0.3% |
| Dickey Kerr | 5 | 1.8 | ▲0.7% |
| Bobby Wallace | 5 | 1.8 | ▼0.9% |
| Hank Gowdy | 4 | 1.5 | ▼1.6% |
| Rube Marquard | 4 | 1.5 | ▼2.3% |
| Stuffy McInnis | 4 | 1.5 | Steady |
| Zack Wheat | 4 | 1.5 | ▼1.2% |
| Jimmy Archer | 3 | 1.1 | ▼1.6% |
| Earle Combs | 3 | 1.1 | ▼1.6% |
| Red Faber | 3 | 1.1 | ▲0.7% |
| Joe McCarthy | 3 | 1.1 | - |
| Fred Tenney | 3 | 1.1 | ▼2.0% |
| Donie Bush | 2 | 0.7 | - |
| Bill Carrigan | 2 | 0.7 | ▼0.8% |
| Gavvy Cravath | 2 | 0.7 | ▼0.1% |
| Lou Criger | 2 | 0.7 | ▼3.5% |
| Wild Bill Donovan | 2 | 0.7 | ▲0.3% |
| Buck Ewing | 2 | 0.7 | - |
| Eddie Grant | 2 | 0.7 | ▲0.3% |
| Hans Lobert | 2 | 0.7 | ▲0.3% |
| Sherry Magee | 2 | 0.7 | ▼0.1% |
| Ossee Schreckengost | 2 | 0.7 | ▼0.1% |
| Smoky Joe Wood | 2 | 0.7 | ▼1.6% |
| Dave Bancroft | 1 | 0.4 | ▼0.4% |
| Jack Barry | 1 | 0.4 | ▼0.7% |
| Marty Bergen | 1 | 0.4 | Steady |
| Bill Bradley | 1 | 0.4 | ▼0.4% |
| George Burns | 1 | 0.4 | ▼0.7% |
| Wilbur Cooper | 1 | 0.4 | Steady |
| Lave Cross | 1 | 0.4 | - |
| Jake Daubert | 1 | 0.4 | Steady |
| Larry Doyle | 1 | 0.4 | ▼1.1% |
| Art Fletcher | 1 | 0.4 | ▼0.7% |
| Chick Fraser | 1 | 0.4 | - |
| Kid Gleason | 1 | 0.4 | Steady |
| Burleigh Grimes | 1 | 0.4 | Steady |
| Charlie Grimm | 1 | 0.4 | - |
| Noodles Hahn | 1 | 0.4 | - |
| Jesse Haines | 1 | 0.4 | - |
| Bucky Harris | 1 | 0.4 | Steady |
| Waite Hoyt | 1 | 0.4 | - |
| Charlie Irwin | 1 | 0.4 | Steady |
| Sam Jones | 1 | 0.4 | - |
| Joe Kelley | 1 | 0.4 | - |
| Otto Knabe | 1 | 0.4 | - |
| Tommy Leach | 1 | 0.4 | - |
| Herman Long | 1 | 0.4 | Steady |
| Dolf Luque | 1 | 0.4 | Steady |
| Pat Moran | 1 | 0.4 | Steady |
| Art Nehf | 1 | 0.4 | ▼1.5% |
| Hub Perdue | 1 | 0.4 | Steady |
| Deacon Phillippe | 1 | 0.4 | - |
| Al Schacht | 1 | 0.4 | - |
| Everett Scott | 1 | 0.4 | ▼0.4% |
| Urban Shocker | 1 | 0.4 | Steady |
| Jake Stahl | 1 | 0.4 | Steady |
| Harry Steinfeldt | 1 | 0.4 | - |
| Hack Wilson | 1 | 0.4 | - |

== Old-Timers Committee ==
As the opening of the Hall approached, criticism mounted that no 19th century figures who were known primarily as players had yet been selected, when basic plans nearly four years earlier had promised five as an ideal initial number. In addition, the six-member Centennial Commission which had selected honorees in the previous two years never had an opportunity to meet. As a result, a smaller "Hall of Fame Committee" (also known as the Old-Timers Committee) of only three members—Commissioner Kenesaw Mountain Landis, National League president Ford Frick, and American League president Will Harridge—was formed to choose appropriate honorees; their selections were announced on May 2, less than six weeks before the Hall's opening. They chose six inductees, all of whom were deceased; of the 13 committee selections between 1937 and 1939, only Connie Mack was still living at the time of the Hall's opening (his Athletics played in the inaugural Hall of Fame game). The committee's choices included the two players who had tied for first in the failed 1936 Veterans vote (the third- and fourth-place finishers had by this time been selected by the BBWAA; the sixth-place choice had been selected by an earlier committee):

- Cap Anson, a star first baseman from the 1870s through the late 1890s, and also a successful manager, who is now widely recognized as the first player to collect 3000 hits in the topmost professional leagues.
- Buck Ewing, the game's premier catcher in the 1880s and early 1890s.

The remaining inductees were:

- Charles "Old Hoss" Radbourn, who won 309 games in an 11-year career in the 1880s, including a record 60 wins in 1884; he had finished seventh in the 1936 vote.
- Albert Spalding, the game's best pitcher in the 1870s (252 wins from 1871 to 1876), who managed Chicago to the first NL pennant and later became not only part owner of the team and the club president, but also the founder of a major sporting goods company.
- Charles Comiskey, a defensive standout at first base in the 1880s who also managed his team to four consecutive pennants and later became owner of the Chicago White Sox, elected more for his overall influence on the game than for his playing days.
- William "Candy" Cummings, who the committee members decided had the strongest claim to having invented the curveball.

== Special election of Lou Gehrig ==
At the major league winter meetings in Cincinnati in December 1939, the BBWAA held a special election to act on Lou Gehrig, who had announced his retirement that summer after being diagnosed with amyotrophic lateral sclerosis. The writers elected Gehrig to the Hall of Fame (the results of that election are unknown) and also determined to postpone the next regular election until 1942, as the initial quota of 10 inductees from the 20th century had been met.
