= 1936 Baseball Hall of Fame balloting =

Elections to the Baseball Hall of Fame

National Baseball

Hall of Fame and Museum
- New inductees: 5
- via BBWAA: 5
- Total inductees: 5
- Induction date: June 12, 1939

The first elections to select inductees to the Baseball Hall of Fame were held in 1936. Five players were selected—Ty Cobb, Babe Ruth, Honus Wagner, Christy Mathewson, and Walter Johnson—with an induction ceremony held in 1939 when the facility was dedicated in Cooperstown, New York.

== Inaugural inductees ==
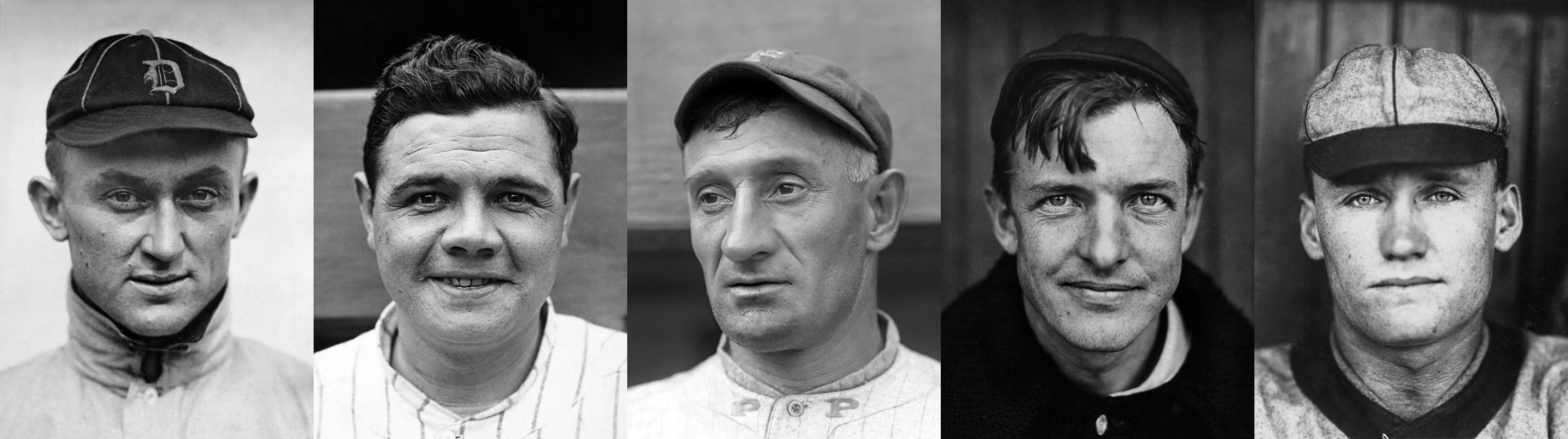
1936 inductees (L–R): Ty Cobb, Babe Ruth, Honus Wagner, Christy Mathewson, and Walter Johnson

== Process ==
Members of the Baseball Writers' Association of America (BBWAA) were given authority to select individuals from the 20th century; while a special Veterans Committee, made up of individuals with greater familiarity with the 19th century game, were polled to select deserving individuals from that era.

The intent was for 15 honorees to be selected before the 1939 ceremonies: 10 from the 20th century and 5 from the 19th century; additional players from both eras would be selected in later years. Voters were given free rein to decide for themselves in which group a candidate belonged, with neither group knowing the outcome of the other election. Thus, some candidates had their vote split between the elections as a result—Cy Young, the pitcher with the most wins in major-league history, finished eighth in the BBWAA vote and fourth in the Veterans vote. In addition, there was no prohibition on voting for active players, a number of whom received votes. Individuals who had been banned from baseball, such as Shoeless Joe Jackson and Hal Chase, were also not formally excluded, though few voters chose to include them on ballots.

In the BBWAA election, voters were instructed to cast votes for 10 candidates, the same number of desired selections; in the Veterans' election, voters were also instructed to vote for 10, although the desire for only 5 initial selections led to revisions in the way the votes were counted. Any candidate receiving votes on at least 75% of the ballots in either election would be honored with induction to the Hall upon its opening in the sport's supposed centennial year of 1939.

== BBWAA vote ==
A total of 226 ballots were cast, with 2,231 individual votes for 47 specific candidates, an average of 9.87 per ballot; 170 votes were required for election. Initial ballots included 33 players listed as suggestions, although revised ballots were later sent with an additional seven names; when questions arose about players who had been omitted, voters needed to be reminded that these names were simply intended as suggestions rather than the entire field of possibilities, and that write-in votes were fully allowed. Candidates who were listed on the ballot as suggestions are indicated here with a dagger (†). The five candidates who received at least 75% of the vote and were elected are indicated in bold italics; candidates who have since been selected in subsequent elections are indicated in italics: Ty Cobb received the most votes, 222, or inclusion on 98.2% of the ballots cast, and thus enjoys the distinction of being the first player elected to the Baseball Hall of Fame. Babe Ruth and Honus Wagner finished in a tie for second with 215 votes apiece.

Player	Votes	Percent
**Ty Cobb**†	**222**	**98.2**
**Babe Ruth**†	**215**	**95.1**
**Honus Wagner**†	**215**	**95.1**
**Christy Mathewson**†	**205**	**90.7**
**Walter Johnson**†	**189**	**83.6**
Nap Lajoie†	146	64.6
Tris Speaker†	133	58.8
Cy Young†	111	49.1
Rogers Hornsby†	105	46.4
Mickey Cochrane†	80	35.3
George Sisler†	77	34.0
Eddie Collins†	60	26.5
Jimmy Collins†	58	25.6
Grover Cleveland Alexander†	55	24.3
Lou Gehrig†	51	22.5
Roger Bresnahan†	47	20.7
Willie Keeler†	40	17.6
Rube Waddell†	33	14.6
Jimmie Foxx†	21	9.2
Ed Walsh†	20	8.8
Ed Delahanty†	17	7.5
Pie Traynor†	16	7.1
Frankie Frisch†	14	6.1
Lefty Grove†	12	5.3
Hal Chase	11	4.8
Ross Youngs†	10	4.4
Bill Terry†	9	3.9
Johnny Kling†	8	3.5
Lou Criger†	7	3.1
Mordecai Brown†	6	2.6
Johnny Evers†	6	2.6
Frank Chance	5	2.2
John McGraw	4	1.7
Ray Schalk†	4	1.7
Al Simmons†	4	1.7
Chief Bender†	2	0.8
Joe Jackson	2	0.8
Edd Roush†	2	0.8
Frank Baker	1	0.4
Bill Bradley†	1	0.4
Fred Clarke	1	0.4
Sam Crawford	1	0.4
Kid Elberfeld	1	0.4
Connie Mack	1	0.4
Rube Marquard†	1	0.4
Nap Rucker	1	0.4
Dazzy Vance†	1	0.4
Charlie Gehringer†	0	0
Gabby Hartnett†	0	0
Billy Sullivan†	0	0

Key to colors
Elected to the Hall. These individuals are also indicated in **bold italics**.
Players who were elected in future elections. These individuals are also indicated in plain italics.

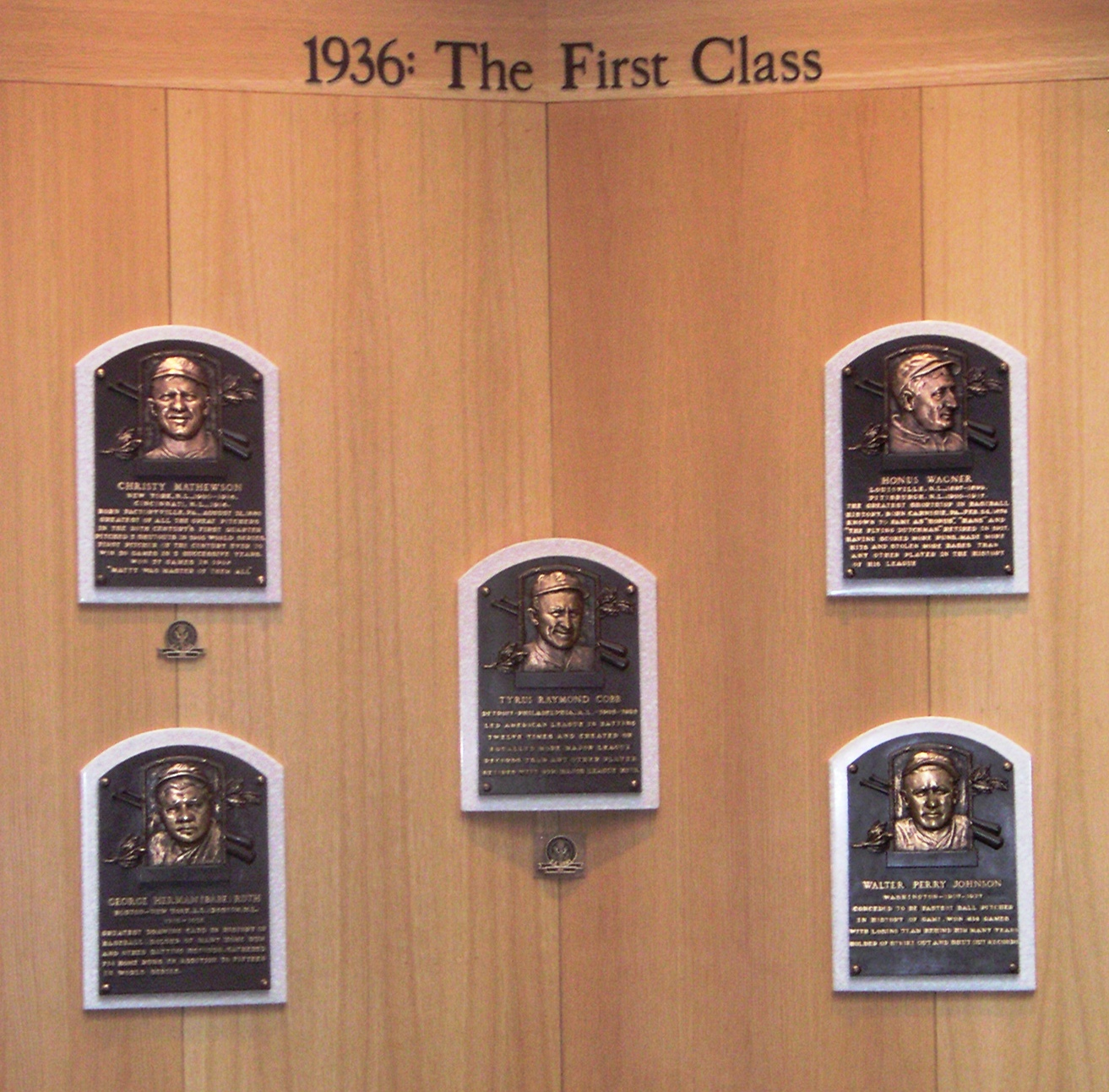
Plaques of the 1936 selections in Cooperstown

== Veterans vote ==
A total of 78 ballots were cast by players, writers, managers and officials who had first-hand familiarity with 19th-century baseball, resulting in 371 individual votes for 57 specific candidates; 59 votes were required for election. No candidates were elected, possibly because of a great deal of confusion regarding the voting procedure. The ballots which were issued in this vote also featured a list of suggested candidates, which was amended after complaints that Ed Delahanty, Willie Keeler and Cy Young should be on this ballot as well as that for the 20th century; but when some voters expressed doubts regarding the possibility of write-in votes, a letter including clearer instructions specifically allowing for write-ins had to be mailed. Many voters were also under the impression that they were to select an "All-Star team" of 10 players, with one at each position; 58 ballots cast in this manner were sent back to the voters to be re-cast, although 10 voters returned the ballots unaltered, stating that was the way they wished to vote regardless of the instructions. The results were delayed for several days until early February while these reminders and revisions took place.

It was further decided, during the tabulations and after the voting, that voters would each be restricted to 5 total votes in order to limit the initial 19th century selections to 5 players; but since most voters had cast votes for 10, it was ruled that each vote would only count as ^{1}/_{2} in the total for that candidate – making a 75% tally nearly mathematically impossible. When the votes were tabulated with this method, only two candidates had totals reaching even 50% of the required number. Plans for a runoff election featuring only the top 12 finishers, to be held prior to the 1939 opening of the Hall, never materialized; even with all the problems, the 1936 vote would remain the Hall's most successful attempt to seek a wide vote from experts on the era regarding candidates from that period.

Candidates who were listed as suggestions on the ballot are indicated here with a †. Candidates who have since been selected in subsequent elections are indicated in italics, as is Honus Wagner, who was elected in the BBWAA vote:

- Cap Anson† – 39^{1}/_{2}
- Buck Ewing† – 39^{1}/_{2}
- Willie Keeler† – 33
- Cy Young† – 32^{1}/_{2}
- Ed Delahanty† – 21^{1}/_{2}
- John McGraw† – 17
- Charles Radbourn† – 16
- Herman Long† – 15^{1}/_{2}
- Mike "King" Kelly† – 15
- Amos Rusie† – 11^{1}/_{2}
- Hughie Jennings† – 11
- Fred Clarke† – 9
- Jimmy Collins† – 8
- Charles Comiskey† – 6
- Jerry Denny† – 6
- Bill Lange – 6
- Wilbert Robinson† – 6
- Harry Stovey – 6
- George Wright† – 6
- John Clarkson† – 5
- Honus Wagner† – 5
- Albert Spalding† – 4
- Hugh Duffy† – 3^{1}/_{2}
- Ross Barnes† – 3
- Charlie Bennett† – 3
- Kid Nichols† – 3
- John Montgomery Ward† – 3
- Fred Dunlap† – 2^{1}/_{2}
- Dan Brouthers† – 2
- Jack Glasscock – 2
- Billy Hamilton† – 2
- Nap Lajoie† – 2
- Ned Williamson – 2
- Bobby Lowe – 1^{1}/_{2}
- Doug Allison – 1
- Joe Battin – 1
- Jake Beckley† – 1
- Tommy Bond – 1
- Jesse Burkett† – 1
- Lou Criger – 1
- Bill Dahlen – 1
- Jake Daubert – 1
- Jack Doyle – 1
- Tim Keefe† – 1
- Matt Kilroy† – 1
- Arlie Latham – 1
- Jimmy McAleer – 1
- Tommy McCarthy† – 1
- Cal McVey – 1
- Charlie Pabor – 1
- Lip Pike – 1
- Jack Remsen – 1
- Hardy Richardson – 1
- Fred Tenney – 1
- George Van Haltren – 1
- Bobby Wallace† – 1
- Deacon White† – 1
- Candy Cummings† – 0
- Silver Flint† – 0
- Lee Richmond† – 0

== See also ==
- List of members of the Baseball Hall of Fame
