= Roger Bresnahan =

American baseball player and manager (1879–1944)

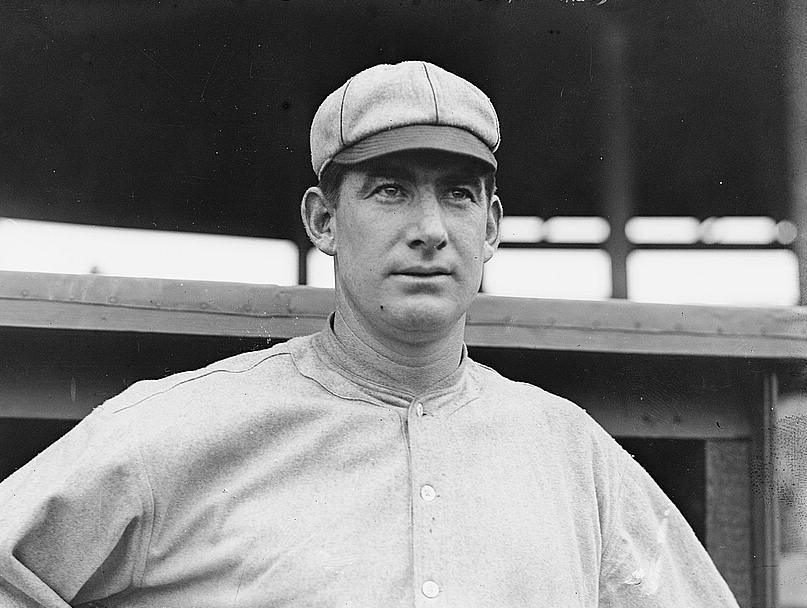
- Catcher / Outfielder / Manager
- Born: June 11, 1879; Toledo, Ohio, U.S.
- Died: December 4, 1944 (aged 65); Toledo, Ohio, U.S.
- Batted: Right Threw: Right

MLB debut
- August 27, 1897, for the Washington Senators

Last MLB appearance
- October 3, 1915, for the Chicago Cubs

MLB statistics
- Batting average: .279
- Home runs: 26
- Runs batted in: 530
- Managerial record: 328–432
- Winning %: .432
- Stats at Baseball Reference
- Managerial record at Baseball Reference

Teams
- As player: Washington Senators (1897); Chicago Orphans (1900); Baltimore Orioles (1901–1902); New York Giants (1902–1908); St. Louis Cardinals (1909–1912); Chicago Cubs (1913–1915); As manager: St. Louis Cardinals (1909–1912); Chicago Cubs (1915)

Career highlights and awards
- World Series champion (1905)

Member of the National

Baseball Hall of Fame
- Induction: 1945
- Election method: Old-Timers Committee

Roger Philip Bresnahan (June 11, 1879 – December 4, 1944), nicknamed "the Duke of Tralee", was an American baseball player and manager in Major League Baseball (MLB). As a major-league player, Bresnahan competed for the Washington Senators (1897), Chicago Orphans (1900), Baltimore Orioles (1901–02), New York Giants (1902–1908), St. Louis Cardinals (1909–1912) and Chicago Cubs (1913–1915). Bresnahan also managed the Cardinals (1909–1912) and Cubs (1915). He was a member of the 1905 World Series champions.

Bresnahan began his career as a pitcher. He also served as an outfielder, before becoming a regular catcher. For his major-league career, Bresnahan had a .279 batting average in 4,480 at bats and a 328–432 managerial win–loss record. Bresnahan popularized the use of protective equipment in baseball by introducing shin guards, to be worn by catchers, in 1907. He also developed the first batting helmet.

After retiring as a player, Bresnahan remained active in professional baseball. He owned the minor league Toledo Mud Hens and coached for the Giants and Detroit Tigers. In 1945, Bresnahan was elected to the National Baseball Hall of Fame.

== Early life ==
Roger Philip Bresnahan was born on June 11, 1879, in Toledo, Ohio. He was the seventh child of Michael and Mary Bresnahan, who had immigrated to the United States from Tralee, Ireland. Bresnahan used to claim that he was also from Tralee, and early in his life, he earned the nickname "The Duke of Tralee".

Bresnahan began playing baseball in grade school, becoming one of the best known sandlot baseball players. He continued to play baseball at Toledo's Central High School.

At 16, Bresnahan signed with a semi-professional team from Manistee, Michigan. After he graduated high school, Bresnahan signed with Lima of the Ohio State League, where he played primarily as a pitcher, but also as a catcher in 1895 and 1896.

== Professional career ==
=== Washington Senators (1897) ===
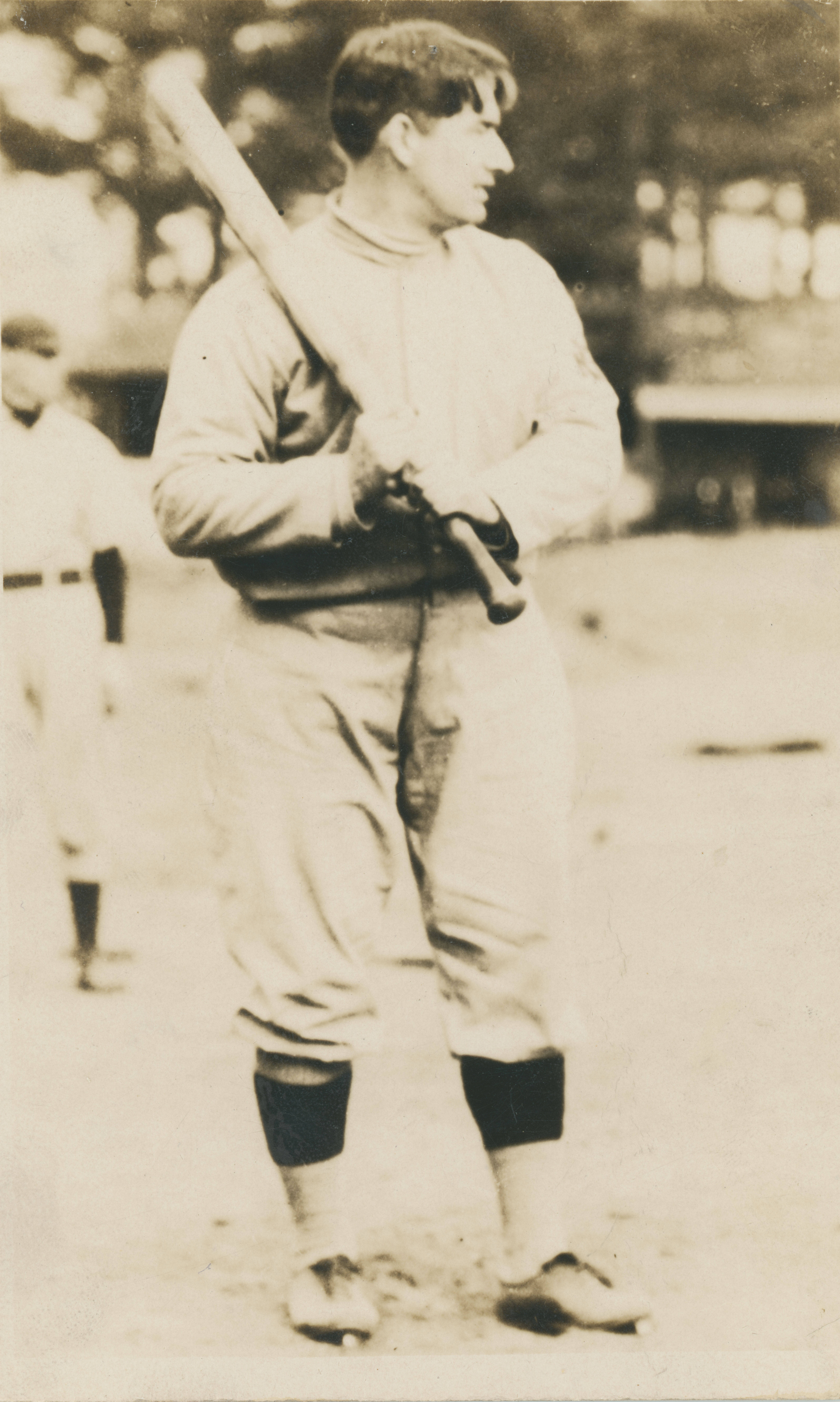
Bresnahan with Toledo, date unknown

On August 10, 1897, the Washington Senators of the National League (NL) purchased Bresnahan from Lima. He began his major-league career as a pitcher, throwing a six-hit shutout in his debut against the St. Louis Browns on August 27, 1897, recording three strikeouts and walking two batters. He had six hits in 16 at bats (a .375 batting average) and had a 4–0 win–loss record for the 1897 Senators. However, the Senators released Bresnahan after the season over a salary dispute, when he attempted to hold out for more money. The Senators offered Bresnahan $2,000 ($77,400 in current dollar terms), but Bresnahan wanted $2,400 ($92,880 in current dollar terms).

Bresnahan played for the Toledo Mud Hens of the Interstate League and the Minneapolis Millers of the Western League in 1898, and the Millers and Buffalo Bisons of the Western League in 1899.

=== Chicago Orphans (1900) ===
Bresnahan appeared in two games at catcher for the Chicago Orphans of the NL in 1900, which served as a tryout.

With the formation of the American League (AL) as a competitor to the NL, Bresnahan, among others, jumped to the AL from the NL. John McGraw, manager of the Baltimore Orioles of the AL saw Bresnahan pitch for Chicago, and decided to sign him for the Orioles before the 1901 season. For the Orioles, Bresnahan filled in at catcher behind Wilbert Robinson, and also appeared in the outfield. A faster baserunner than the average catcher, Bresnahan had two inside-the-park home runs on May 30, 1902.

=== New York Giants (1902–1908) ===
With the Orioles reportedly in significant debt, part-owner John Mahon purchased shares of the team from star players Joe Kelley and John McGraw, who had resigned from the team and signed with the New York Giants of the NL, becoming the majority shareholder. On July 17, 1902, he sold his interest in the Orioles to Andrew Freedman, principal owner of the Giants, and John T. Brush, principal owner of the Cincinnati Reds, also of the NL. That day, Freedman and Brush released Bresnahan, Kelley, Joe McGinnity, Jack Cronin, Cy Seymour, and Dan McGann from their contracts. Brush then signed Kelley and Seymour to the Reds, while Freedman signed McGinnity, Bresnahan, Cronin, Gilbert, and McGann, joining McGraw, his new player-manager, on the Giants.

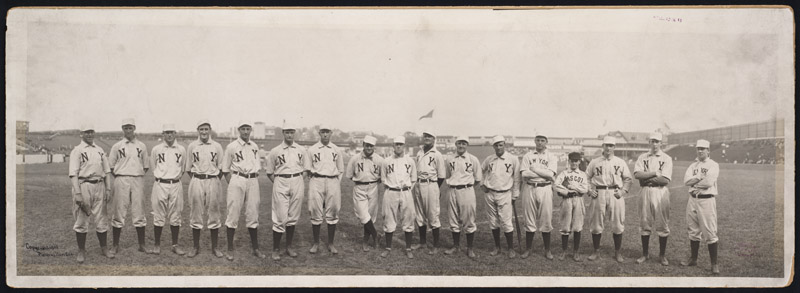
Bresnahan (third from right) with the New York Giants before playing in the 1905 World Series

With Frank Bowerman and Jack Warner established as the Giants' catchers, McGraw played Bresnahan as the center fielder for the Giants. In 1903, Bresnahan batted .350, trailing Honus Wagner's .355 average atop the NL. Bresnahan batted .284 in the 1904 season, playing 96 games in the outfield, ten games at first base, four games at shortstop, and one game apiece at second base and third base, as the Giants were champions of the NL.

Bresnahan shifted to catcher full-time in 1905, as Bowerman became less effective and Warner left the Giants. Christy Mathewson preferred pitching to Bresnahan. Bresnahan caught all five games in the 1905 World Series, including three shutouts by Mathewson, and one shutout thrown by Joe McGinnity. Bresnahan led the Giants with a .313 batting average in the World Series.

Bresnahan had a memory almost as good as [Christy] Mathweson or [Joe] McGinnity. He never had to be told twice. Once we had discovered a weak spot in the opposition and had discussed a plan for attacking it I could depend absolutely on Bresnahan to carry it out. He did not forget. His whole mind was concentrated on winning that particular game and it was rarely that he overlooked anything.

— John McGraw

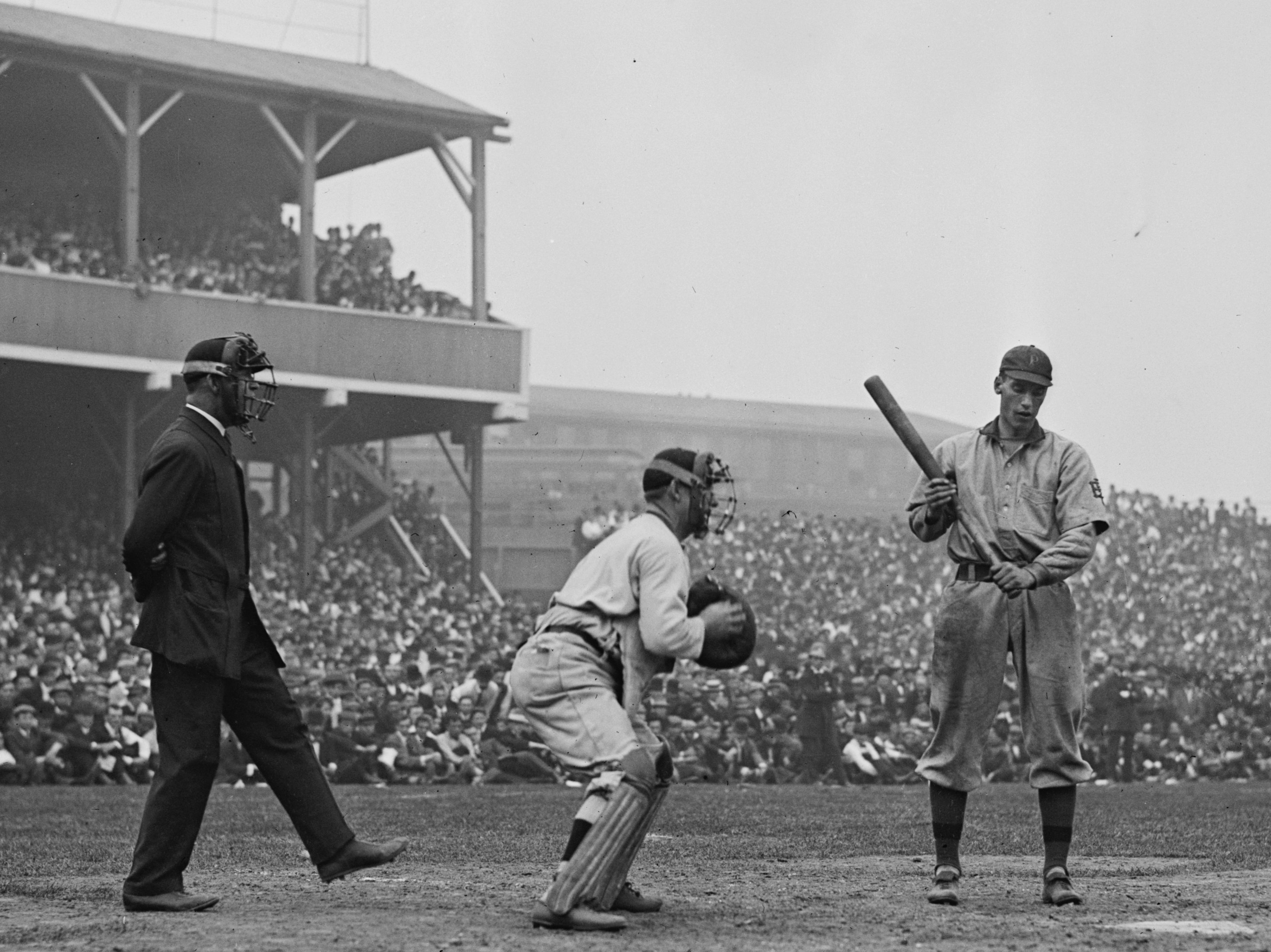
Roger Bresnahan catching at a York Giants vs. Pittsburgh Pirates game in 1908

On Opening Day in 1907, Bresnahan began to experiment with protective gear. Though Negro league catcher Chappie Johnson wore protective gear and Nig Clarke wore similar gear in 1905, most catchers did not wear any protective equipment at that time. Bresnahan practiced in shin guards that are worn in cricket during spring training, and debuted them on April 11, 1907. Fans, used to seeing catchers play without protective equipment, threw snowballs on the field, and without police at the game, umpire Bill Klem called off the game, with the Giants forfeiting to the Philadelphia Phillies. The press also criticized the use of shin guards. However, other catchers began to adopt Bresnahan's idea. Though Pittsburgh Pirates manager Fred Clarke protested Bresnahan's gear to the league, the protest was denied and the equipment was approved. Bresnahan caught a career-high 138 games in 1908, batting .283 and leading the NL in walks.

Bresnahan also developed the first batting helmet. He was hit in the head with a pitch by Andy Coakley of the Cincinnati Reds on June 18, 1907. Bresnahan was unconscious, and a Catholic priest read him his last rites. Bresnahan was hospitalized for ten days, during which time he developed schematics for a plastic batting helmet, though this piece of equipment did not become commonplace until the 1940s. Bresnahan was also the first catcher to wear a padded facemask while catching.

== Managerial career ==
=== St. Louis Cardinals (1909–1912) ===
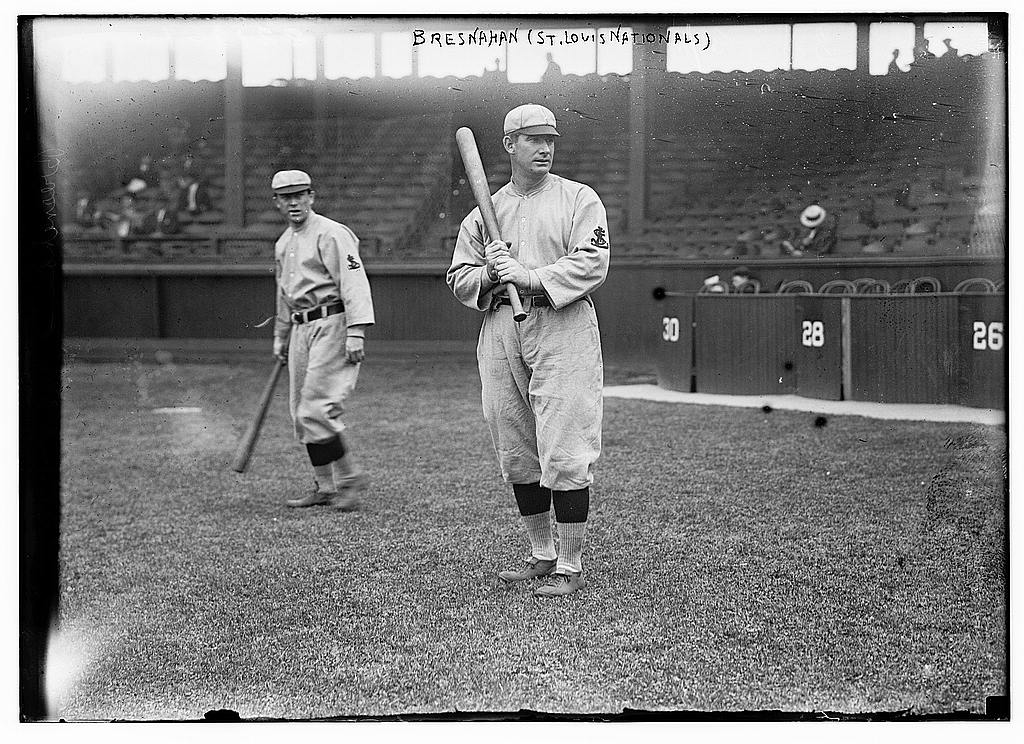
Miller Huggins (left) and Bresnahan with the Cardinals, c. 1911

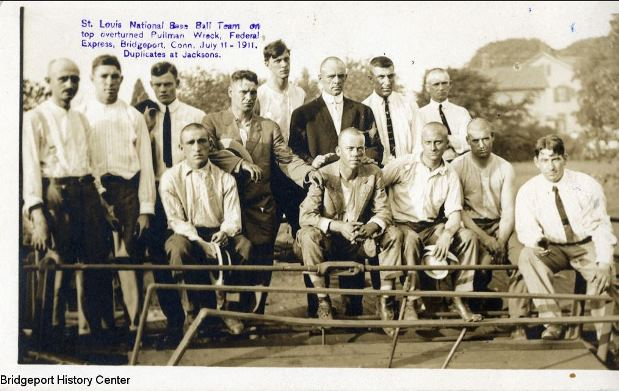
Members of the 1911 Cardinals at the site of the Bridgeport train wreck; Bresnahan is at front-right, seated

The Giants obtained younger and faster players in 1909; McGraw had Chief Meyers ready to succeed Bresnahan at catcher. Stanley Robison of the St. Louis Cardinals became interested in hiring Bresnahan to be a player-manager. As McGraw did not want to block Bresnahan from the opportunity, the Giants traded Bresnahan to the Cardinals for Red Murray, Bugs Raymond and Admiral Schlei after the 1908 season. Bresnahan led the Cardinals, who won only 49 games in 1908, to 54 wins in 1909 and 63 wins in 1910. Attendance increased from 205,000 fans in 1908 to 299,000 fans in 1909, and 355,000 fans in 1910.

Grateful for the improvement at the box office, Robison signed Bresnahan to a five-year contract to manage the team for a salary of $10,000 per season ($345,536 in current dollar terms), plus ten percent of the club's profits. Robison died in March 1911, and ownership of the team transferred to Helene Hathaway Britton, his niece.

On July 11, 1911, with the Cardinals only 4.5 games out of first place, the team was involved in a train wreck while riding the Federal Express to Boston. Fourteen people were killed after the train derailed and plunged down an 18-foot (5.5 m) embankment outside Bridgeport, Connecticut. None of the Cardinals were seriously injured, due to a fortuitous change in the location of their two Pullman cars, requested by Bresnahan. The Cardinals helped rescue the injured and remove bodies.

Bresnahan and Britton feuded publicly in 1912, as the Cardinals fell to sixth place in the NL. The Cardinals fired Bresnahan after the 1912 season due to various arguments Bresnahan had with Britton, including over Bresnahan's desire to sell Miller Huggins to another franchise. Britton cited decreased profits as a sign that Bresnahan was uninterested in the job. Huggins succeeded Bresnahan as Cardinals' manager, as she preferred Huggins' "gentlemanly" manner, as opposed to Bresnahan's rougher personality. Bresnahan hired an attorney to obtain the remainder of his salary. He eventually settled the lawsuit against Britton for $20,000 ($667,241 in current dollar terms).

=== Chicago Cubs (1913–1915) ===
Following his termination by the Cardinals, the NL declared Bresnahan a free agent. He signed a three-year contract with the Cubs, receiving $10,000 ($325,758 in current dollar terms) per season with a $25,000 signing bonus ($814,394 in current dollar terms). He served as player-manager for the Cubs in 1915, but was released when his batting average slipped.

== Later career ==
As the rival Federal League collapsed and the Cubs merged with the Chicago Whales of the Federal League, the Cubs decided to replace Bresnahan with Whales manager Joe Tinker.

The Cubs paid Bresnahan for the remaining two years on his contract and aided Bresnahan in purchasing the Toledo Mud Hens, then in the American Association, in 1916. The club had moved to Cleveland to block the Federal League from placing a team there, but returned to Toledo under Bresnahan's control. Bresnahan played for the team until 1918, when he announced his retirement. He played for a semi-professional team in 1919, and appeared in five games for the Mud Hens in 1921. Bresnahan worked to add lights to Toledo's stadium, so that they could play night games.

Bresnahan sold the Mud Hens before the 1924 season. McGraw then hired Bresnahan as a coach for the Giants, a position he held from 1925 through 1928. He coached for the Detroit Tigers in 1930 and 1931.

== Post-baseball career ==
During the offseasons, Bresnahan returned to Toledo. He worked as a hotel detective at the Boody House, which he later purchased. Bresnahan lost much of his money in the stock market crash of 1929. He worked as a manual laborer, as a guard at the Toledo Workhouse, and as a salesman for Toledo's Buckeye Brewing Company.

Bresnahan ran for sheriff of Lucas County as a member of the Democratic Party in 1932. He lost, and endorsed the victorious candidate in his reelection bid two years later. Bresnahan ran for county commissioner in 1944, winning the Democratic Party nomination, but losing in the general election by a few hundred votes out of 140,000 votes cast.

Bresnahan died of a heart attack at his home in Toledo on December 4, 1944, at the age of 65. He was survived by his wife, Gertrude, and his daughter, Marian. He was buried in Calvary Cemetery in Toledo.

== Profile and legacy ==
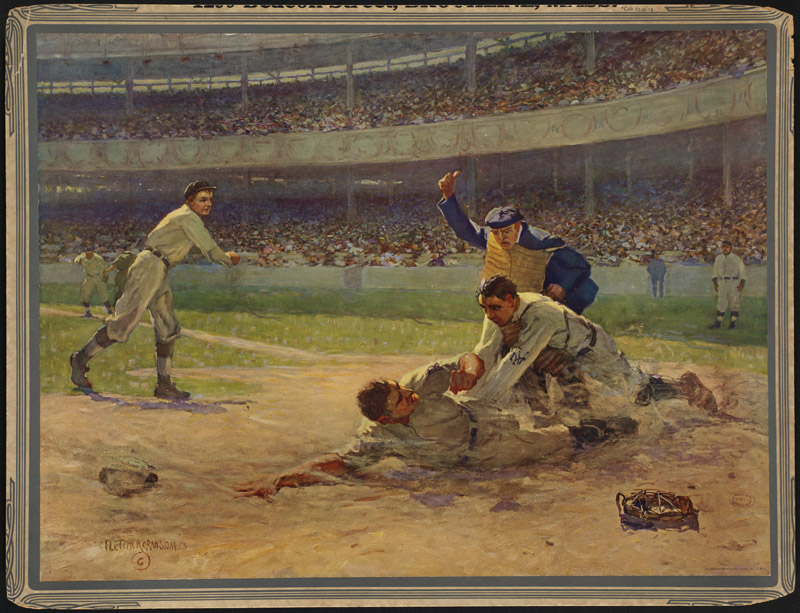
Bresnahan tagging out a runner while Christy Mathewson and John McGraw watch in Out at Home, by Fletcher C. Ransom

In 1,446 games, he had a batting average of .279 with 26 home runs and 530 runs batted in in 4,480 at-bats. His overall managerial record was 328–432 (.432). Miller Huggins named Bresnahan the catcher on his all-time team.

Bresnahan stood approximately 5 feet 9 inches (1.75 m). He was described as "highly strung and almost abnormally emotional" by a reporter. Bill James wrote that Bresnahan "was one of those guys that if you were on his team and played hard he was as nice to you as could be, but if you got on his bad side you'd think he was the Breath of Hell."

Bresnahan was known for baiting umpires. He and McGraw were often ejected from games, suspended, and on a few occasions escorted from the field by police. A 1911 directive by NL president Thomas Lynch, compelling umpires to prevent catchers from antagonizing batters with verbal abuse, mentioned only Bresnahan by name.

Bresnahan was elected to the Hall of Fame the year after his death. He had received 47 votes of the 226 electors in the 1936 Hall of Fame balloting, and between 43 and 67 votes each time from 1937 through 1942. In the 1945 balloting, occurring one month after Bresnahan's death, he received 133 votes, still falling short of enshrinement. However, the Permanent Committee noticed the surge in votes and elected him in April 1945.

Regarding his Hall of Fame induction, James has criticized the election, saying that Bresnahan "wandered in the Hall of Fame on a series of miscalculations", and regarding his election, that "the Hall of Fame had, for the first time, selected a player who clearly had no damn business being there".

=== Commemorations ===
Bresnahan was mentioned in the 1949 poem "Line-Up for Yesterday" by Ogden Nash:

Baseball Hall of Fame plaque

Battery mate of Christy Mathewson with the New York Giants, he was one of the games most natural players and might have starred at any position. The "Duke of Tralee" was one of the few major league catchers fast enough to be used as a leadoff man

Line-Up for Yesterday

B is for Bresnahan
Back of the plate;
The Cubs were his love,
and McGraw his hate.

— Ogden Nash, Sport magazine (January 1949)

== See also ==
- List of Major League Baseball career stolen bases leaders
- List of Major League Baseball player-managers
