= 1945 Baseball Hall of Fame balloting =

Elections to the Baseball Hall of Fame

National Baseball

Hall of Fame and Museum
- New inductees: 10
- via Old Timers Committee: 10
- Total inductees: 38

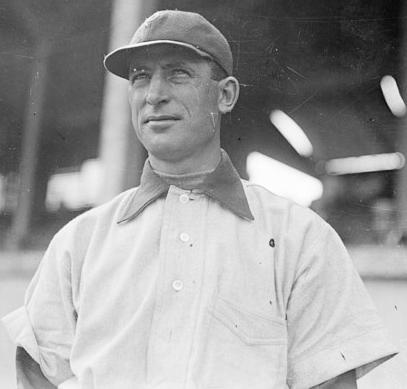
Inductees Fred Clarke (left) and Hugh Duffy, the only two players who were still living when elected in 1945.

Elections to the Baseball Hall of Fame for 1945 included the first regular election conducted in three years and a strong response to criticism of the slow pace of honors. The Baseball Writers' Association of America (BBWAA) voted by mail to select from recent players, and elected no one. The Old Timers Committee responded by electing the biggest class yet, ten people. The selections by the Committee, announced in April 1945, were: Roger Bresnahan, Dan Brouthers, Fred Clarke, Jimmy Collins, Ed Delahanty, Hugh Duffy, Hughie Jennings, King Kelly, Jim O'Rourke, and Wilbert Robinson.

After the baseball centennial and grand opening of the Hall of Fame in 1939, the BBWAA had determined to vote only every third year. After electing three players that year, it elected one in 1942 and none in 1945. New rules now provided that the writers would return to voting on recent players annually.

== 1944 background ==
In response to increasing complaints that the stars of the 19th century were being ignored, commissioner Kenesaw Mountain Landis had in August 1944 enlarged the Hall of Fame Committee from four members to seven. He had instructed them to elect a minimum of 10 players from the 1876–1900 period when they met as the Old-Timers Committee in early 1945—a goal the committee members believed would be relatively easy to meet, as some among them stated that the number of qualified candidates was likely over two dozen. After Landis' death in November 1944, the committee met briefly and elected Landis to the Hall of Fame. They also suggested that if the January 1945 election by the BBWAA failed to select any players whose careers extended into the initial years of the 20th century, some would be selected by the committee when they met in February.

== BBWAA election ==
Members of the BBWAA again had the authority to select any players active in the 20th century (after 1900), provided they had not appeared in a major league game in 1944. Voters were instructed to cast votes for 10 candidates; any candidate receiving votes on at least 75% of the ballots would be honored with induction to the Hall.

A total of 247 ballots were cast, with 2,362 individual votes for 95 specific candidates, an average of 9.56 per ballot; 186 votes were required for election. The results were announced on January 28, 1945. The emphasis on the players of the 1900s and 1910s, who many voters felt should be given priority, again continued to increase beyond the levels seen in 1939 and 1942. Only five of the top 22 candidates in the voting, and none of the top six, had seen any substantial play since 1917; only three of the top 36, and none of the top 22, had played their final season anytime between 1918 and 1933. Eight of the top 13 candidates were deceased. Players who had been retired over 27 years – 48 of the 94 named – received 72% of the votes.

For the first time in the three BBWAA elections, no candidate received at least 75% of the vote. Particularly since the next election was not scheduled to be held until 1948, that a new generation of players was quickly becoming eligible, and that increasingly fractured voting patterns would make selections more improbable, criticism became widespread that the election system needed to be reviewed and quickly revised; it was suggested that the Old-Timers Committee might select some of the earliest popular candidates to help clear the top of the ballot. At its September 1945 meeting, the Hall of Fame Committee ordered that the three-year wait between elections be abolished, and that annual elections resume under a revised format.

Candidates who have since been selected in subsequent elections are indicated in italics; players chosen by the Old-Timers Committee in 1945 are marked with an asterisk (*).

Player	Votes	Percent	Change
Frank Chance	179	72.5	▲14.1%
Rube Waddell	154	62.3	▲3.9%
Ed Walsh	137	55.5	▲7.0%
Johnny Evers	134	54.3	▲15.2%
Roger Bresnahan*	133	53.8	▲29.3%
Miller Huggins	133	53.8	▲6.2%
Mickey Cochrane	125	50.6	▲12.8%
Jimmy Collins*	121	49.0	▲19.8%
Ed Delahanty*	111	44.9	▲0.3%
Clark Griffith	108	43.7	▲13.2%
Frankie Frisch	101	40.9	▲4.8%
Hughie Jennings*	92	37.2	▲9.7%
Wilbert Robinson	81	32.8	▼5.4%
Pie Traynor	81	32.8	▲13.5%
Hugh Duffy*	64	25.9	▼7.1%
Fred Clarke*	53	21.5	▼3.4%
Rabbit Maranville	51	20.6	▼7.7%
Joe Tinker	49	19.8	▲4.3%
Mordecai Brown	46	18.6	▼8.4%
Herb Pennock	45	18.2	▼12.7%
Joe McGinnity	44	17.8	▼7.5%
Chief Bender	40	16.2	▼7.4%
Eddie Plank	33	13.4	▼13.6%
Ray Schalk	33	13.4	▼9.3%
Bill Terry	32	13.0	▼2.5%
Lefty Grove	28	11.3	-
Frank Baker	26	10.5	▼6.2%
Carl Hubbell	24	9.7	-
Addie Joss	23	9.3	▼4.9%
Ross Youngs	22	8.9	▼10.0%
Dazzy Vance	18	7.3	▼8.6%
Dizzy Dean	17	6.9	-
Bill Dickey (Note: These players received votes despite not yet being retired; they had not appeared in any major league games during 1944 due to military service, and later resumed their major league careers.)	17	6.9	-
Johnny Kling	12	4.9	▼1.5%
Charlie Gehringer	10	4.0	-
Nap Rucker	10	4.0	▼2.4%
Babe Adams	7	2.8	▼1.9%
Lefty Gomez	7	2.8	-
Harry Heilmann	5	2.0	▲0.3%
Kid Nichols	5	2.0	▼0.1%
Edd Roush	5	2.0	▲1.6%
Sam Crawford	4	1.6	▲0.7%
Ted Lyons	4	1.6	-
Bill Carrigan	3	1.2	-
Wild Bill Donovan	3	1.2	-
Hank Gowdy	3	1.2	▼2.2%
Hank Greenberg	3	1.2	-
Bobby Wallace	3	1.2	▲0.3%
Jesse Burkett	2	0.8	▼0.9%
Kid Elberfeld	2	0.8	▲0.4%
Eddie Grant	2	0.8	▼0.5%
Gabby Hartnett	2	0.8	-
Bobby Lowe	2	0.8	▲0.4%
Bill McKechnie	2	0.8	-
Deacon Phillippe	2	0.8	▲0.4%
Branch Rickey	2	0.8	-
Casey Stengel	2	0.8	-
Zack Wheat	2	0.8	▼0.5%
Ginger Beaumont	1	0.4	Steady
Donie Bush	1	0.4	▼0.5%
Howie Camnitz	1	0.4	-
Max Carey	1	0.4	-
Earle Combs	1	0.4	-
Wid Conroy	1	0.4	-
Harry Davis	1	0.4	-
Joe DiMaggio	1	0.4	-
Bill Dinneen	1	0.4	Steady
Mike Donlin	1	0.4	-
Jack Dunn	1	0.4	Steady
Kid Gleason	1	0.4	-
Joe Gordon	1	0.4	-
Charlie Grimm	1	0.4	-
Heinie Groh	1	0.4	-
Dickey Kerr	1	0.4	Steady
Tony Lazzeri	1	0.4	-
Duffy Lewis	1	0.4	-
Herman Long	1	0.4	-
Sherry Magee	1	0.4	Steady
Pepper Martin (Note: Martin had retired after the 1940 season, and received votes in 1942 balloting, then came back from retirement and played 40 major league games in 1944.)	1	0.4	▼0.5%
Bob Meusel	1	0.4	-
Pat Moran	1	0.4	-
Van Mungo	1	0.4	-
Danny Murphy	1	0.4	-
Claude Ritchey	1	0.4	-
Eppa Rixey	1	0.4	-
Charlie Root	1	0.4	-
Amos Rusie	1	0.4	Steady
Cy Seymour	1	0.4	-
Jimmy Sheckard	1	0.4	-
Billy Southworth	1	0.4	-
Bill Sweeney	1	0.4	-
Jesse Tannehill	1	0.4	-
Johnny Vander Meer	1	0.4	-
Cy Williams	1	0.4	-
Steve Yerkes	1	0.4	-

Key to colors
Players who were elected in future elections. These individuals are also indicated in plain italics.

== Old-Timers Committee ==
In response to the failure of the BBWAA to select any inductees, the Old-Timers Committee was encouraged to assist the BBWAA in clearing the congestion at the top of its ballot by including, among their 10 requested selections from the period 1876–1900, some players whose careers extended into the early 20th century – in particular, the three players gaining over 100 votes in the BBWAA election whose careers had peaked before 1905.

The committee members were: Hall of Fame president Stephen C. Clark, who chaired the committee; Hall of Fame treasurer Paul S. Kerr, the committee secretary; Yankees president Ed Barrow; Athletics owner/manager Connie Mack; New York sportswriter Sid Mercer; Braves president Bob Quinn; and Boston sportswriter Mel Webb. The committee had initially planned to meet in February; but the long search for a successor to Landis, along with the retirements of Barrow and Quinn as club presidents, delayed the meeting until April 25, one day after Albert "Happy" Chandler was elected as the new commissioner. On that day, in the offices of the New York Yankees, six members of the committee met to make their selections; Sid Mercer could not attend due to a long illness which took his life 8 weeks later.

=== Selections ===
The committee, as requested, selected 10 inductees, the first three by unanimous vote:

- Fred Clarke, a left fielder, primarily with the Pittsburgh Pirates, from 1894 to 1911; he compiled a .312 career batting average, and also led the team to four pennants in 16 seasons as manager, as well as the 1909 World Series title. He retired in 1915 with a major league record 1602 career wins as a manager.
- Jimmy Collins, widely regarded as the greatest third baseman in the major leagues' first 70 years; he batted over .300 five times, finishing with a .294 average, and also managed the Boston Americans to a victory in the first World Series in 1903.
- Wilbert Robinson, a catcher for 17 seasons; he caught a record 1108 games before 1900. He later served as the New York Giants' pitching coach for 11 years, then managed Brooklyn for 18 seasons, winning two pennants; upon his retirement, his win total as a manager trailed those of only John McGraw and Clarke in National League history.
- Roger Bresnahan, often regarded as the game's best catcher of the 1900s, and described by both McGraw and Branch Rickey as the greatest catcher they had ever seen; in 1907 he became the first major league catcher to wear shinguards, and was a capable player at every position. He was fast enough to bat leadoff, and remains the only catcher to steal over 200 bases in his career. He managed the Cardinals and Cubs for a total of five seasons, and was later a coach with the Giants and Tigers.
- Dan Brouthers, a star first baseman from 1879 to 1896 who won five batting titles (a 19th-century record) and retired with a .342 career average; the game's greatest power hitter of the 1880s, he was the only 19th century player to have a career slugging percentage over .500. He later became a scout for the Giants.
- Ed Delahanty, a left fielder from 1888 to 1903, and the sport's greatest slugger of the 1890s, batting over .400 three times; he won batting titles in both leagues and had a .346 career average. He hit four home runs in one game in 1896, and had a 31-game hitting streak in 1899. He died at age 35 in 1903 when he fell from a bridge into the Niagara River after being put off a train.
- Hugh Duffy, a center fielder from 1888 to 1905 who starred primarily with the Boston Beaneaters; his .438 batting average in 1894 remains the major league record for a single season, and he retired with a career average of .324. Perhaps the best defensive outfielder of the era, as well as the first recognized triple crown winner, he later became a hitting coach for the Red Sox for a number of years, tutoring the young Ted Williams.
- Hughie Jennings, the fiery shortstop and team captain of the Baltimore Orioles in the 1890s; he batted .401 in 1896 and retired with a .311 average. He later managed the Tigers from 1907 to 1920, winning pennants in his first three years; he left the Tigers trailing only Connie Mack and Clark Griffith in career wins among AL managers. Afterward, he was a coach for the Giants on four consecutive pennant winners.
- Mike "King" Kelly, who starred as an outfielder and catcher with several teams from 1878 to 1893, and was an extraordinary baserunner; he led the Chicago White Stockings to 5 pennants in the 1880s, and retired with a .308 batting average. He was always aware of the loopholes in the official rules, and some prominent figures in the game estimated that half of all the rules in baseball had been created in response to his exploiting their oversights. Along with manager-teammate Cap Anson, he is often credited with devising the hit-and-run and the double steal.
- Jim O'Rourke, an outfielder from 1872 to 1893, and one of the game's earliest stars, played for six pennant winners in the 1870s. Along with Cap Anson, he was one of two players to collect over 2000 hits in the major leagues before 1893; he later played in the minor leagues until he was past 50.

Of the 10 selections, only Clarke and Duffy were still living. The committee intended to consider the pitchers of the era at their next meeting in September, and to elect additional members at that time. When they met in Cooperstown on September 6, however, they focused instead on revising the widely criticized election process, and ordered that the BBWAA resume annual elections under a revised format which was hoped to facilitate more selections (the BBWAA having selected only one player in six years). Former National League president John Heydler participated in the meeting to replace those members who were deceased or otherwise unable to attend. Once the decision was made to hold the next election in 1946 rather than in 1948, the committee agreed to postpone the selection of pitchers and other candidates until they met in spring 1946.

=== Other candidates ===
Among those candidates who were not elected by the Old-Timers Committee at their April 1945 meeting, there were five who received particularly strong support or attention:

- The committee chose not to consider Clark Griffith and Charles "Kid" Nichols until pitchers were more completely reviewed at their next meeting.
- Popular support to elect recently deceased President Franklin Roosevelt, in recognition of his support for baseball's continuation for morale purposes during World War II, was met with uncertainty on the committee's part as to whether they had the authority to elect someone who was never a major league player, manager or executive. They opted to seek advice on this point before taking action in his case.
- The candidacy of Abner Doubleday, based on his supposed invention of baseball at Cooperstown in 1839, had become more controversial due to increasing skepticism regarding the historical basis for that belief. It was widely believed that the committee intended to seek further information either supporting or refuting the story before taking action.
- There was support for electing Jim "Deacon" White, a star catcher and third baseman of the 1870s and 1880s; but after choosing several candidates from the turn of the century and adding three stars of the 1880s, the committee had fulfilled its initial obligation of 10 selections and chose to postpone further choices until meeting again.

=== Criticism and rationale ===
Although the committee's selections were roundly applauded at the time, in later years many baseball historians and writers came to believe strongly that the committee erred in some of its 1945 selections, and that too many individuals had been elected; however, this view does not consider the fact that the committee had been required to select 10 inductees that year. There are also several factors which make the reasons for their choices clearly discernible:

1. After the failed BBWAA election, the committee was primarily focused on assisting the BBWAA in relieving the congestion at the top of its ballot, and was encouraged to select some players who had played into the early 20th century and were receiving support in the BBWAA vote. Therefore, their selections that year tended to strongly favor the period between 1893 (when baseball moved the pitcher back 10 feet from the plate) and 1910; all ten of their selections were active players in 1893 or later, and seven were active after 1900.
2. Of all the non-pitchers who had retired before 1910, only 5 had received more than 2 votes (1% of the vote) in the 1945 BBWAA election: Jimmy Collins (121), Ed Delahanty (111), Hughie Jennings (92), Wilbert Robinson (81) and Hugh Duffy (64). All five were stars prior to 1900, with only Collins playing regularly after 1903, and each had received over 25% of the BBWAA vote; every other non-pitcher retired before 1910 who had ever received over 2% of the BBWAA vote had already been elected. The committee elected all five, and criticism of any of these choices is more appropriately directed at the BBWAA voters who supported their selection, as the Old-Timers Committee was acting simply out of agreement with their vote.
3. The committee apparently made an attempt to elect players at positions which were not yet represented in the Hall; by 1945, the BBWAA had elected 20th century players at every position except catcher, third base and left field. The committee's election of Jimmy Collins corrected the absence of a third baseman, as he was generally regarded as the game's greatest player at the position to that time and had consistently finished first among third basemen in the BBWAA voting, usually outpolling the combined totals of all others at the position. His career spanned the years 1894 to 1908, easily allowing him to be considered a star in both centuries. The committee's choices at the other two positions also followed the BBWAA vote closely. Catcher Roger Bresnahan had finished first among catchers in most of the BBWAA elections, with only the recently retired Mickey Cochrane competing for the top spot. In the voting since 1937, Fred Clarke had trailed only Ed Delahanty – who died in 1903 – among left fielders. Both Bresnahan and Clarke were stars of the 1900s who had made their major league debuts in the 1890s, making them eligible for selection by the Old-Timers.
4. Among most of those following the elections, there was very strong sentiment to choose players who had remained in the sport as managers, coaches or executives after retiring. Eight of the selections were major league managers at some point, with five (Clarke, Collins, Jennings, King Kelly and Robinson) leading their teams to pennants. Bresnahan, Jennings and Robinson each served at least five seasons as coaches in the major leagues, and Duffy worked as a scout for many years. With the elections of Clarke, Robinson and Jennings, 5 of the 9 retired managers with over 1000 wins were now in the Hall (as well as the still-active Connie Mack), with Clark Griffith's candidacy deferred. There were 14 managers with at least 1000 wins before 1945; all have since been elected, the last being Frank Selee in 1999.
5. There was a strong emphasis on those who had played central roles on championship teams, particularly the three-time champion Baltimore Orioles of 1894-95-96 which were regarded by many as the greatest baseball dynasty of the 19th century; Dan Brouthers, Jennings and Robinson were all regulars on that team, with Jennings also playing for a later Brooklyn champion and Brouthers starring for 3 earlier champions. Bresnahan had starred on the 1905 New York Giants; Collins was the playing manager of the 1903 Boston Americans, and a star player for two NL champions of the late 1890s; Duffy starred on 5 pennant winners in Boston in the 1890s; and Clarke was the playing manager of 4 pennant winners in Pittsburgh. Kelly and Jim O'Rourke each starred on several pennant winners in the era before 1893. Of the 10 selections, 8 had been a starting player and/or manager on at least four pennant winners.
