= Hoagland, Ohio =

Unincorporated community in Ohio, U.S.

Coordinates: 39°12′15″N 83°40′53″W

Hoagland is an unincorporated community in Highland County, in the U.S. state of Ohio.

== History ==
The community was named after the local Hoagland family. A variant name was Ludwick. A post office called Ludwick was established in 1890, and remained in operation until 1906.

== Notable people ==
- Buck Ewing (1859–1906), Hall of fame catcher for the New York Giants (MLB).
