= Buck Ewing =

American baseball player and manager (1859–1906)

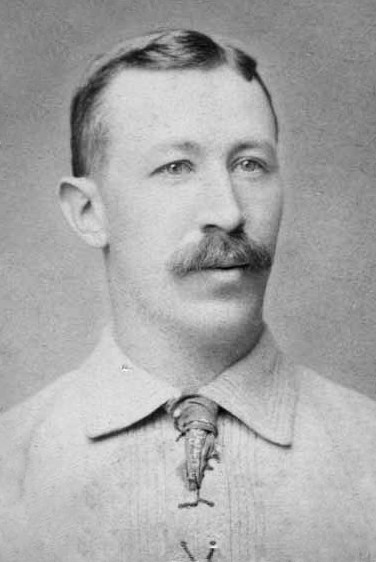
- Catcher / Infielder / Outfielder / Manager
- Born: October 17, 1859; Hoagland, Ohio, U.S.
- Died: October 20, 1906 (aged 47); Cincinnati, Ohio, U.S.
- Batted: Right Threw: Right

MLB debut
- September 9, 1880, for the Troy Trojans

Last MLB appearance
- May 27, 1897, for the Cincinnati Reds

MLB statistics
- Batting average: .303
- Home runs: 71
- Runs batted in: 883
- Stats at Baseball Reference

Teams
- As player: Troy Trojans (1880–1882); New York Gothams / Giants (1883–1889); New York Giants (PL) (1890); New York Giants (1891–1892); Cleveland Spiders (1893–1894); Cincinnati Reds (1895–1897); As manager: New York Giants (PL) (1890); Cincinnati Reds (1895–1899); New York Giants (1900)

Career highlights and awards
- NL home run leader (1883)

Member of the National

Baseball Hall of Fame
- Induction: 1939
- Election method: Old-Timers Committee

William "Buck" Ewing (October 17, 1859 – October 20, 1906) was an American Major League Baseball player and manager. He was renowned for both his offensive and defensive skills during his playing career. In 1939, Ewing was elected to the Baseball Hall of Fame, becoming the first catcher to receive the honor.

== Career ==
Born in Hoagland, Ohio, in 1859, Ewing joined the National League in 1880 as a member of the Troy Trojans, but rose to stardom in 1883 as a member of the New York Gothams, later known as the Giants. That year he hit 10 home runs (a feat he would never repeat), while batting .303. Playing in an era when triples were more common than home runs due to the spacious parks and poor quality of the balls used, he led the league in 1884 with 20 triples, and was often among the league leaders.

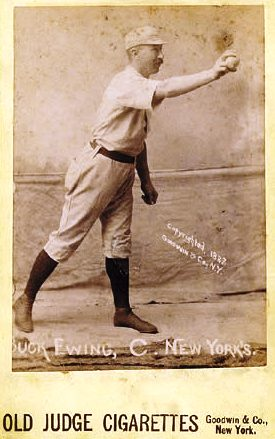
Buck Ewing in 1887. Notice the lack of glove.

Ewing was equally renowned for his defensive abilities. Writing in the 1938 Spalding Guide, John Foster said of him, "As a thrower to bases Ewing never had a superior, and there are not to exceed ten men who could come anywhere near being equal to him. Ewing was the man of whom it was said, "He handed the ball to the second baseman from the batter's box." Primarily a catcher, Ewing was versatile enough to play all nine positions and fast enough to steal 354 bases. He hit .300 in ten different seasons.

Playing until 1897 with the Giants, Cleveland Spiders and Cincinnati Reds, Ewing posted consistently superb offensive numbers. Arguably his best season was in 1893 with the Spiders when he batted .344 with 6 home runs, 117 runs, 122 RBI, and 47 stolen bases.

In 1890, when a player revolt led to the formation of the short-lived Players' League, Ewing led the New York franchise as both star player and manager. Lingering resentment in the wake of the league's establishment and demise has been suspected as a reason for his limited play in 1891 and subsequent move to Cleveland following the 1892 season. Ewing finished his career with a .303 lifetime batting average, 1129 runs, 883 RBI, 250 doubles, 178 triples, and 71 home runs – totals made more impressive by the fact he was playing annual seasons only 100-130 games long.

In addition to playing, Ewing managed for seven seasons: the 1890 (Players' League) Giants, the 1895–1899 Cincinnati Reds, and the first half of the season with the 1900 Giants. He compiled a 489-395 record for a .553 winning percentage. Ewing also was used as an American Association umpire for two games on June 28 and July 4, 1882.

Ewing died of diabetes in Cincinnati in 1906.

== Legacy ==
In the first elections to the Baseball Hall of Fame, Ewing and Cap Anson led all 19th century players. Three years later, in 1939, they were among the first 19th century players elected and Ewing became the first member who was primarily a catcher. He was named one of the top five players from the 19th century in a 1999 poll by the Society for American Baseball Research.

In the 1947 film Life with Father, set in the late 1800s, Clarence Day's son Clarence, Jr. announces to everyone that the morning paper noted Buck Ewing had hit a home run for the Giants the day before.

== See also ==
- List of Major League Baseball player-managers
- List of Major League Baseball career runs scored leaders
- List of Major League Baseball career triples leaders
- List of Major League Baseball annual triples leaders
- List of Major League Baseball annual home run leaders
