= Hughie Jennings =

American baseball player, coach, and manager (1869–1928)

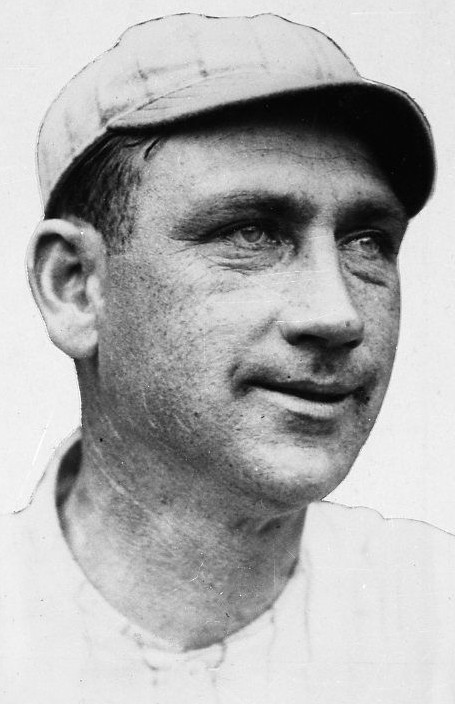
- Shortstop / First baseman / Manager
- Born: April 2, 1869; Pittston, Pennsylvania, U.S.
- Died: February 1, 1928 (aged 58); Scranton, Pennsylvania, U.S.
- Batted: Right Threw: Right

MLB debut
- June 1, 1891, for the Louisville Colonels

Last MLB appearance
- September 2, 1918, for the Detroit Tigers

MLB statistics
- Batting average: .311
- Home runs: 18
- Runs batted in: 840
- Managerial record: 1,184–995
- Winning %: .543
- Stats at Baseball Reference
- Managerial record at Baseball Reference

Teams
- As player: Louisville Colonels (1891–1893); Baltimore Orioles (1893–1899); Brooklyn Superbas (1899–1900); Philadelphia Phillies (1901–1902); Brooklyn Superbas (1903); Detroit Tigers (1907, 1909–1910, 1912, 1918); As manager: Detroit Tigers (1907–1920); New York Giants (1924–1925)

Career highlights and awards
- 2× World Series champion (1921, 1922); Name honored by the Tigers

Member of the National

Baseball Hall of Fame
- Induction: 1945
- Election method: Old-Timers Committee

Hugh Ambrose Jennings (April 2, 1869 – February 1, 1928) was an American professional baseball player, coach and manager from 1891 to 1925. Jennings was a leader, both as a batter and as a shortstop, with the Baltimore Orioles teams that won National League championships in 1894, 1895, and 1896. During those three seasons, Jennings had 355 runs batted in and hit .335, .386, and .401.

Jennings was a fiery, hard-nosed player who was not afraid to be hit by a pitch to get on base. In 1896, he was hit by pitches 51 times – a major league record that has never been broken. Jennings also holds the career record for being hit by pitches with 287, with Craig Biggio (who retired in 2007) holding the modern-day career record of 285. Jennings also played on the Brooklyn Superbas teams that won National League pennants in 1899 and 1900. From 1907 to 1920, Jennings was the manager of the Detroit Tigers, where he was known for his colorful antics, hoots, whistles, and his famous shouts of "Ee-Yah!" from the third base coaching box. Jennings suffered a nervous breakdown in 1925 that forced him to leave Major League Baseball. In 1945, Jennings was posthumously inducted into the Baseball Hall of Fame.

== Early years ==
Born in Pittston, Pennsylvania, Jennings was the son of Irish immigrants, James and Nora, who according to Jack Smiles's biography of Jennings, Ee-yah: The Life and Times of Hughie Jennings, Baseball Hall of Famer (page 7), arrived in Pittston in 1851.

Jennings worked as a breaker boy (young boys who separated the coal from the slate) in the local anthracite coal mines. He drew attention playing shortstop for a semi-professional baseball team in Lehighton, Pennsylvania in 1890. He was signed by the Louisville Colonels of the American Association in 1891. He stayed with the Colonels when they joined the National League in 1892 and was traded on June 7, 1893 to the Baltimore Orioles.

== Baltimore Orioles: 1893–1899 ==
Jennings played with the Orioles for parts of seven seasons and became a star during his years in Baltimore. The Baltimore Orioles teams of 1894, 1895, and 1896 are regarded as one of the greatest teams of all time. The teams featured Hall of Fame manager Ned Hanlon and a lineup with six future Hall of Famers: first baseman Dan Brouthers, second baseman John McGraw, shortstop Jennings, catcher Wilbert Robinson, right fielder "Wee Willie" Keeler, and left fielder Joe Kelley. Amidst all those great players, Jennings was appointed captain in 1894, his first full season with the team.

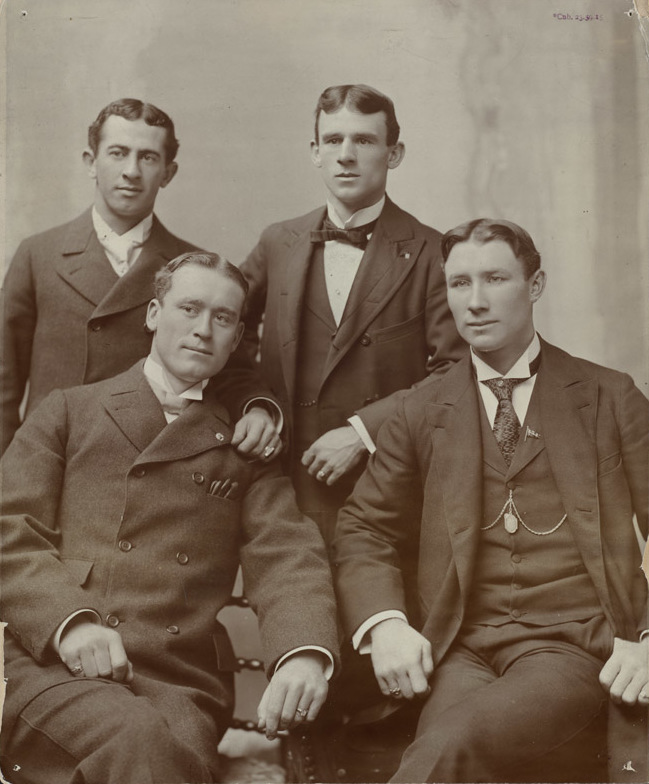
Baltimore Orioles' Hall of Fame players "Wee Willie" Keeler, Joe Kelley, John McGraw, and Hughie Jennings, circa 1894

During the Orioles' championship years, Jennings had some of the best seasons ever by a major league shortstop. In 1895, he hit .386, scored 159 runs, collected 204 hits, knocked in 125 runs, and stole 53 bases. In 1896, his performance was even better, as he hit .401 (2nd best in the National League) with 209 hits, 121 RBI, and 70 stolen bases.

The fiery Jennings was also known as one of the most fearless players of his time, allowing himself to be hit by pitches more than any other player. In one game, he was hit by a pitch three times. In 1896, he was hit by pitches 51 times—a Major League record that still stands. In just five seasons with the Orioles from 1894 to 1898, Jennings was hit by pitches an unprecedented 202 times. During one game, Jennings was hit in the head by a pitch from Amos Rusie in the 3rd inning, but managed to finish the game. As soon as the game ended, Jennings collapsed and was unconscious for three days.

Jennings was also one of the best fielding shortstops of the era. He led the National League in fielding percentage and putouts three times each. He had as many as 537 assists and 425 putouts in single seasons during his prime. His 425 putouts ties him with Donie Bush for the single season record for a shortstop. In 1895, he had a career-high range factor of 6.73–1.19 points higher than the league average (5.54) for shortstops that year. He once handled 20 chances in a game, and on another occasion had 10 assists in a game. In 1898, he threw his arm out, and his career as a shortstop came to an end. After that, Jennings was forced to move to first base.

== Brooklyn Superbas and Philadelphia Phillies: 1899–1903 ==
In 1899, when manager Ned Hanlon moved to the Brooklyn Superbas, several of his star players, including Jennings, Joe Kelley, and Willie Keeler followed. While Jennings was never the same after the injury to his arm in 1898, he contributed to Brooklyn's National League pennants in 1899 and 1900.

In 1901, Jennings was traded to the Philadelphia Phillies. However, his failing arm cut his career short, as he never played in more than 82 games or hit above .272 in two seasons with the Phillies. Jennings played 6 games for the Superbas in 1903, effectively ending his playing career, with the exception of 9 at bats during his tenure as the manager of the Detroit Tigers.

== Cornell Law School and an off-season law practice ==
While playing for the Orioles in the 1890s, Jennings and John McGraw both attended classes at St. Bonaventure University. After the 1899 season, Jennings was accepted to Cornell Law School. He managed the Cornell University baseball team while studying law and concluded that he was well-suited to being a manager. While at Cornell, he joined the Phi Delta Theta fraternity chapter there. Jennings continued as a scholar-athlete until the spring of 1904, when he left campus early to manage the Orioles. Though he never finished his law degree at Cornell, Jennings passed the Maryland bar exam in 1905 and started a law practice. Jennings practiced law in Baltimore and in Scranton, Pennsylvania. He continued to work at his law practice during the off-seasons through the remainder of his baseball career.

== The "Ee-Yah" years: 1907–1920 ==
Jennings's antics

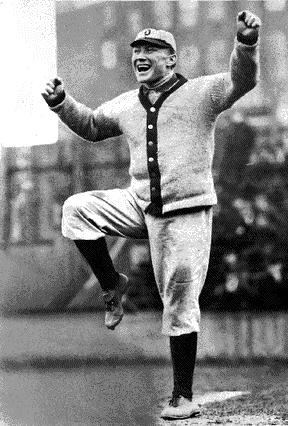
As Detroit's third base coach, Jennings would shout "Ee-yah!" and other loud sounds while throwing his arms up and lifting his right leg.

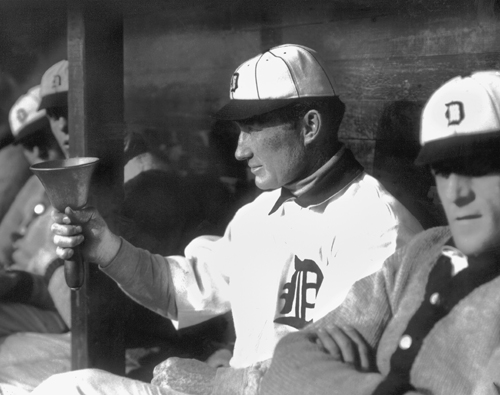
Hughie Jennings with a bell in the Tigers dugout

In 1907, Jennings was hired as manager of a talented Detroit Tigers team that included future Hall of Famers Ty Cobb and Sam Crawford. Jennings led the Tigers to three consecutive American League pennants, in 1907–1908-1909. However, Jennings's teams lost the 1907 and 1908 World Series to the "Tinker to Evers to Chance" Chicago Cubs and the 1909 Series to Honus Wagner's Pittsburgh Pirates. Jennings continued to manage the Tigers through the 1920 season, though his teams never won another pennant.

During his years as Detroit's manager, Jennings became famous for his antics, mostly in the third base coaching box, which variously included shouts of "Ee-Yah", and other whoops, whistles, horns, gyrations, jigs, and grass-plucking. The "Ee-Yah" whoop became his trademark and was accompanied with waves of both arms over his head and a sharp raising of his right knee. In 1907, he was suspended for taunting opponents with a tin whistle. The "Ee-Yah" shouts continued and became such a trademark that Jennings became known as Hughie "Ee-Yah" Jennings, and Detroit fans would shout "Ee-Yah" when Jennings appeared on the field. (See also Jack Smiles, Ee-yah: The Life And Times Of Hughie Jennings, Baseball Hall Of Famer)

Hughie Jennings was honored alongside the retired numbers of the Detroit Tigers in 2000.

Behind the antics was a great coaching mind. Connie Mack called Jennings one of the three greatest managers in history, along with John McGraw and Joe McCarthy. One of his greatest challenges, and accomplishments, during his years in Detroit was to manage the unmanageable—Ty Cobb. Jennings recognized Cobb's talent and his complicated psychological makeup and concluded the best strategy would be to let Cobb be Cobb. Jennings reportedly called Cobb aside one day and said, "There isn't anything about baseball I can teach you. Anything I might say to you would merely hinder you in your development. The only thing for you to do is go ahead and do as you please. Use your own judgment.. . . . . Do what you think is best and I'll back you up."

In 1912, during a game in which "pick-ups" played for the Tigers when the regular team went on strike to protest the suspension of Cobb after an incident involving a fan in the stands whom Cobb assaulted, Jennings, who also sent his coaches in as substitute players, came to bat himself once as a pinch hitter. According to one source, when the umpire asked him for whom he was batting, Jennings answered, "None of your business." The umpire noted on his lineup sheet, "Jennings--batted for exercise."

While Jennings was fiery, hard-nosed, colorful, and even eccentric, he insisted he had always played the game honestly. When a scandal arose in 1926 concerning whether Ty Cobb and Tris Speaker had fixed a 1919 game between the Detroit and the Cleveland Indians while Jennings was the manager, Jennings initially spoke of how easy it would be to fix a game and issued a "no comment" on the specific game. After his "no comment" drew negative publicity, Jennings issued a statement to the press in December 1926 denying knowledge of the matter and adding, "My slate has been clean base ball for 35 years... Whatever I have done in base ball has been of such a nature that I would be ready any time to go before anyone and place my case before them." After the 1920 season, Jennings stepped down as the Tigers' manager. His 1,131 wins was the most in Tigers history until Sparky Anderson passed him in 1992.

== New York Giants: 1921–1925 ==
Jennings signed on as a coach with his old friend, John McGraw, who was managing the New York Giants. Jennings and McGraw, who met while working as coaches at St. Bonaventure University (which later named their baseball field after the two), became close friends. Jennings was the best man at McGraw's wedding and a pallbearer following the death of McGraw's 23-year-old wife in 1899. McGraw and Jennings staged a reunion year after year on their birthdays. Jennings won two World Series as a coach in 1921 and 1922. When McGraw became ill, Jennings filled in as the Giants' manager for parts of 1924 and 1925. His overall managing record was 1184–995.

== Managerial record ==
Team	Year	Regular season					Postseason			
Team	Year	Games	Won	Lost	Win %	Finish	Won	Lost	Win %	Result
DET	1907	150	92	58	.613	1st in AL	0	4	.000	Lost World Series (CHC)
DET	1908	153	90	63	.588	1st in AL	1	4	.200	Lost World Series (CHC)
DET	1909	152	98	54	.645	1st in AL	3	4	.429	Lost World Series (PIT)
DET	1910	154	86	68	.558	3rd in AL	–	–	–	
DET	1911	154	89	65	.578	2nd in AL	–	–	–	
DET	1912	153	69	84	.451	6th in AL	–	–	–	
DET	1913	153	66	87	.431	6th in AL	–	–	–	
DET	1914	153	80	73	.523	4th in AL	–	–	–	
DET	1915	154	100	54	.649	2nd in AL	–	–	–	
DET	1916	154	87	67	.565	3rd in AL	–	–	–	
DET	1917	153	78	75	.510	4th in AL	–	–	–	
DET	1918	126	55	71	.437	7th in AL	–	–	–	
DET	1919	140	80	60	.571	4th in AL	–	–	–	
DET	1920	154	61	93	.396	7th in AL	–	–	–	
DET total		2103	1131	972	.538		4	12	.250	
NYG	1924	44	32	12	.727	Interim	–	–	–	
NYG	1925	32	21	11	.656	Interim	–	–	–	
NYG total		76	53	23	.697		0	0	–	
Total		2179	1184	995	.543		4	12	.250	

== A lifetime of tragic accidents ==
Jennings's life was filled with several tragic accidents. There was the beaning incident in Philadelphia that left him unconscious for three days. While attending Cornell, he fractured his skull diving head-first into a swimming pool at night, only to find the pool had been emptied. In December 1911, Jennings came close to death after an off-season automobile accident. While driving a car given to him by admirers, Jennings's car overturned while crossing a bridge over the Lehigh River near Gouldsboro, 23 miles (37 km) southeast of Scranton. In the crash, Jennings again fractured his skull, suffered a concussion of the brain, and broke both legs and his left arm. For several days after the accident, doctors were unsure if Jennings would survive.

The physical abuse and blows to the head undoubtedly took their toll. During the 1925 season, McGraw was ill, and Jennings was put in full charge of the Giants. The team finished in second place and the strain caught up with Jennings, who suffered a nervous breakdown when the season ended. According to his obituary, Jennings "was unable to report" to spring training in 1926 due to his condition. Jennings retired to the Winyah Sanatorium in Asheville, North Carolina. He did return home to Scranton, Pennsylvania, spending much of his time recuperating in the Pocono Mountains.

On February 1, 1928, Jennings died at age 58 at his home at 530 Vine Street in Scranton, Pennsylvania. The cause of death was spinal meningitis with tuberculosis as a contributory cause.

Jennings was posthumously elected to the Baseball Hall of Fame in 1945 as a player.

== See also ==
- List of Major League Baseball career stolen bases leaders
- List of Major League Baseball managerial wins and winning percentage leaders
- List of Major League Baseball player-managers
- 1909 Detroit Tigers season
