= Fred Clarke =

American baseball player and manager (1872–1960)

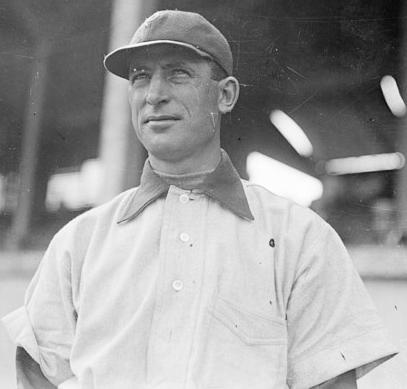
- Clarke in 1903
- Outfielder / Manager
- Born: October 3, 1872; Winterset, Iowa, U.S.
- Died: August 14, 1960 (aged 87); Winfield, Kansas, U.S.
- Batted: Left Threw: Right

MLB debut
- June 30, 1894, for the Louisville Colonels

Last MLB appearance
- September 23, 1915, for the Pittsburgh Pirates

MLB statistics
- Batting average: .312
- Hits: 2,678
- Home runs: 67
- Runs batted in: 1,015
- Stolen bases: 506
- Managerial record: 1,602–1,181
- Winning %: .576
- Stats at Baseball Reference
- Managerial record at Baseball Reference

Teams
- As player: Louisville Colonels (1894–1899); Pittsburgh Pirates (1900–1911, 1913–1915); As manager: Louisville Colonels (1897–1899); Pittsburgh Pirates (1900–1915)

Career highlights and awards
- World Series champion (1909); Pittsburgh Pirates Hall of Fame

Member of the National

Baseball Hall of Fame
- Induction: 1945
- Election method: Old-Timers Committee

Fred Clifford Clarke (October 3, 1872 – August 14, 1960) was an American Major League Baseball player from 1894 to 1915 and manager from 1897 to 1915. Clarke played for and managed both the Louisville Colonels and Pittsburgh Pirates. He was a left fielder and left-handed batter.

Of the nine pennants in Pittsburgh franchise history, Clarke was the player-manager for four of them. He and fellow Hall of Famers Honus Wagner and Vic Willis led Pittsburgh to a victory over Ty Cobb and the Detroit Tigers in the 1909 World Series. Clarke batted over .300 in 11 different seasons. His 35-game hitting streak in 1895 was the second-longest in Major League history at the time. For six years, Clarke held the Major League record for wins by a manager. In 1945, Clarke was inducted into the National Baseball Hall of Fame.

Clarke recorded the first official cycle on July 23, 1901, vs. the Cincinnati Reds, going 4–5 with two runs batted in (RBI). Nap Lajoie would become the second player to accomplish the feat seven days later, in a July 30, 1901, game between Lajoie's Philadelphia Athletics and the Cleveland Blues.

== Early life and career ==
Fred Clarke was born on a farm near Winterset, Iowa. At age two, his family moved as part of a covered wagon caravan from Iowa to Kansas before relocating to Des Moines, Iowa, five years later. As a child in Des Moines, Clarke sold newspapers for the Iowa State Register where his boss was future Baseball Hall of Fame member, Ed Barrow. In 1892, a professional team in Hastings, Nebraska sent a railroad ticket to Des Moines semiprofessional player Byron McKibbon, but McKibbon backed out and gave the ticket to Clarke instead. Clarke impressed the Hastings team and he signed his first professional contract. He was in the Southern League at age 21 and played for teams in Montgomery, Alabama, and Savannah, Georgia.

Clarke was discovered in the minor leagues by Louisville part-owner, Barney Dreyfuss, and joined the Colonels in 1894. In his first game, he collected five hits in five at bats which is still a Major League record. In his second season, he asserted himself with a batting average of .347, 191 hits and 96 runs, which were all best on the team by far. In 1897, Clarke took over managerial duties while only 24 years old. As a player, he hit a career-high .390. Only the best average of Willie Keeler's career stopped Clarke from winning his only batting title. (For many years, Clarke's 1897 average was listed as .406, but further research led most official sources, including MLB.com, to list it at .390.) Despite Clarke's excellent hitting and the presence of fellow Hall of Famers Honus Wagner and Rube Waddell, the team struggled for several years. While in Louisville, Clarke was teamed up with pitcher Chick Fraser. Clarke and Fraser became brothers-in-law when they married sisters. When the Colonels folded, Barney Dreyfuss became the owner of the Pittsburgh franchise and tapped Clarke, Wagner, Waddell, Deacon Phillippe, and others to accompany him.

== Pittsburgh ==
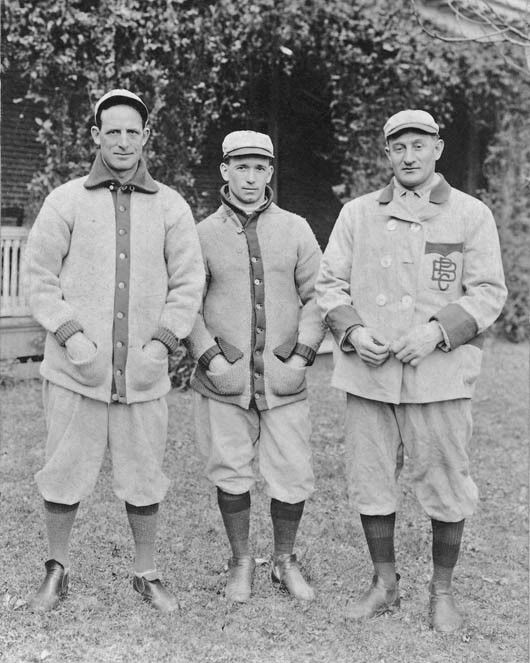
Clarke (left) with Pirates teammates Tommy Leach and Honus Wagner

In 1900, Clarke joined the Pittsburgh Pirates as a player and manager, roles he would embrace until his retirement in 1915. 1903 was arguably the best hitting season of Clarke's career as he led the Major Leagues in slugging average and OPS and led the National League in doubles. He finished second only to his teammate, Honus Wagner, for the National League batting title. In the first World Series, Clarke hit .265 but Boston's Cy Young and Bill Dinneen outpitched Pittsburgh overall and won the series in eight games.

In the 1909 World Series, Clarke batted only .211 but hit both of Pittsburgh's home runs and had more home runs and RBI than any player on either team. Clarke also set a record for most walks for one player in a World Series game with four in Game 7.

On August 23, 1910, Clarke recorded four assists from the outfield in one game, tying a Major League record. The following season, his last as a regular player, 38-year-old Clarke made 10 putouts in left field in one game on April 25, 1911. Clarke played just 12 more games after 1911, the last three as the oldest active player in the majors.

Clarke finished his career with a .312 batting average and is seventh on the all-time triples list with 220. He led his team to four National League pennants (1901, 1902, 1903 and 1909) and one World Series championship (1909). The 1902 Pirates lost only 36 games under Clarke's guidance, tying a modern-era record. In 1912, Clarke passed Cap Anson and Frank Selee, giving him the Major League record for wins by a manager. Clarke's record, in turn, was broken by John McGraw in 1918. In addition to the four pennants and one World Series, Clarke managed Pittsburgh to five second-place seasons, three third-place seasons, and two 100-win seasons.

== After his playing days ==
After his managing days ended in 1915, Clarke returned to his "Little Pirate Ranch" near Winfield, Kansas, which he had purchased with a down payment during his first year in the majors. He made a considerable fortune when oil was discovered on his property. In 1924, he bought a minority stake in the Pirates and was named the team's vice president. He was also allowed to sit in the dugout during games, making him manager Bill McKechnie's bench coach in all but name. The Pirates won the World Series the following year.

During the 1926 season, several players felt that Clarke was trying to undermine McKechnie and become manager once again. When slumping veteran (and eventual Hall of Famer) Max Carey got word that Clarke tried to pressure McKechnie into benching him, Carey demanded that Clarke be removed from the bench. He was supported by Babe Adams, the only player on the 1909 world champions still on the team, as well as another veteran, Carson Bigbee. McKechnie initially appeared to side with Carey, Adams and Bigbee, but was forced to recant rather than risk appearing to criticize the front office. A resolution calling for Clarke's removal from the bench only garnered the support of three other players. Ownership struck fast and hard; on August 13, the Pirates released Adams and Bigbee, and waived Carey. They finished 84–69, third in the league behind the St. Louis Cardinals and the Cincinnati Reds, and McKechnie lost his job.

Clarke was selected to the Baseball Hall of Fame in 1945 as one of the first to be elected by the Old-Timers Committee. He was one of 24 original inductees into the Iowa Sports Hall of Fame in 1951. Clarke remained active and seemingly indestructible into his 70s. In 1947, while fishing in northern Minnesota, he and his wife were thrown into icy northern Minnesota waters by a storm, but he was back out fishing the next day. Soon after, he was nearly shot accidentally while quail hunting. He then survived a gas furnace explosion in his basement. While in Winfield he started the Winfield Country Club that is still in operation to this day. Clarke died in Winfield at age 87.

=== Hall of Fame voting ===
Year	Votes		Percent
1936	BBWAA	1	0.4%
1936	Veterans	9	
1937	22		10.9%
1938	63		24.0%
1939	59		21.5%
1942	58		24.9%
1945	BBWAA	53	21.5%
1945	Old-Timers	Unanimous	

== Managerial record ==
Team	Year	Regular season					Postseason			
Team	Year	Games	Won	Lost	Win %	Finish	Won	Lost	Win %	Result
LOU	1897	92	35	54	.393	11th in NL	–	–	–	–
LOU	1898	154	70	81	.464	9th in NL	–	–	–	–
LOU	1899	156	75	77	.493	9th in NL	–	–	–	–
LOU total		402	180	212	.459		0	0	–	
PIT	1900	140	79	60	.568	2nd in NL	–	–	–	–
PIT	1901	140	90	49	.647	1st in NL	0	0	.000	National League Champions
PIT	1902	142	103	36	.741	1st in NL	0	0	.000	National League Champions
PIT	1903	141	91	49	.650	1st in NL	3	5	.375	Lost World Series (BOS)
PIT	1904	156	87	66	.569	4th in NL	–	–	–	–
PIT	1905	155	96	57	.627	2nd in NL	–	–	–	–
PIT	1906	154	93	60	.608	3rd in NL	–	–	–	–
PIT	1907	157	91	63	.591	2nd in NL	–	–	–	–
PIT	1908	155	98	56	.636	2nd in NL	–	–	–	–
PIT	1909	154	110	42	.724	1st in NL	4	3	.571	Won World Series (DET)
PIT	1910	154	86	67	.562	3rd in NL	–	–	–	–
PIT	1911	155	85	69	.552	3rd in NL	–	–	–	–
PIT	1912	152	93	68	.578	2nd in NL	–	–	–	–
PIT	1913	155	78	71	.523	4th in NL	–	–	–	–
PIT	1914	158	69	85	.448	7th in NL	–	–	–	–
PIT	1915	156	73	81	.474	5th in NL	–	–	–	–
PIT total		2,424	1,422	969	.595		7	8	.467	
Total		2,826	1,602	1,181	.576		7	8	.467	

== See also ==
- List of Major League Baseball annual doubles leaders
- List of Major League Baseball annual triples leaders
- List of Major League Baseball career hits leaders
- List of Major League Baseball career triples leaders
- List of Major League Baseball career runs scored leaders
- List of Major League Baseball career runs batted in leaders
- List of Major League Baseball career stolen bases leaders
- List of Major League Baseball player-managers
- List of Major League Baseball managers with most career ejections
- List of Major League Baseball managerial wins and winning percentage leaders
- List of Major League Baseball players to hit for the cycle

Preceded by Harry Davis; Nap Lajoie	Hitting for the cycle July 23, 1901; May 7, 1903	Succeeded by Nap Lajoie; Buck Freeman
