= Jimmy Collins =

American baseball player (1870–1943)

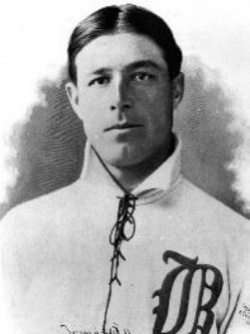
- Collins c. 1896–1900
- Third baseman / Manager
- Born: January 16, 1870; Niagara Falls, New York, U.S.
- Died: March 6, 1943 (aged 73); Buffalo, New York, U.S.
- Batted: Right Threw: Right

MLB debut
- April 19, 1895, for the Louisville Colonels

Last MLB appearance
- August 29, 1908, for the Philadelphia Athletics

MLB statistics
- Batting average: .294
- Home runs: 65
- Runs batted in: 983
- Managerial record: 455–376
- Winning %: .548
- Stats at Baseball Reference
- Managerial record at Baseball Reference

Teams
- As player: Boston Beaneaters (1895); Louisville Colonels (1895); Boston Beaneaters (1896–1900); Boston Americans (1901–1907); Philadelphia Athletics (1907–1908); As manager: Boston Americans (1901–1906)

Career highlights and awards
- World Series champion (1903); NL home run leader (1898); Boston Red Sox Hall of Fame

Member of the National

Baseball Hall of Fame
- Induction: 1945
- Election method: Old-Timers Committee

James Joseph Collins (January 16, 1870 – March 6, 1943) was an American professional baseball player. He played 14 seasons in Major League Baseball. In 1945, Collins was elected to the Baseball Hall of Fame. He played for the Boston Beaneaters, Louisville Colonels, Boston Americans, and Philadelphia Athletics. He also managed the Americans.

Collins was especially regarded for his defense. He was best known for his ability to field a bunt—prior to his debut, it was the shortstop who fielded bunts down the third base line—and is regarded as a pioneer of the modern defensive play of a third baseman. He is second all-time in putouts by a third baseman, behind only Brooks Robinson. At the plate, Collins finished his career with 65 home runs, 1055 runs scored, 983 RBI and a .294 batting average.

Collins was also the first manager of the Boston Red Sox franchise, then known as the Boston Americans. He was the winning manager in the first World Series, as Boston defeated the Pittsburgh Pirates in the 1903 World Series, five games to three.

== Early life ==
Jimmy Collins was born in Niagara Falls, New York. After graduating from St. Joseph's Collegiate Institute, then known as St. Joseph's College, he went to work for the Delaware, Lackawanna and Western Railroad and played baseball in the Buffalo City League.

== Playing career ==
=== Minor leagues ===
Collins began his professional baseball career with the minor league Buffalo Bisons of the Eastern League, the forerunner of the current International League, in 1893. That season, he was used primarily as a shortstop, batting .286 in 76 games.

In 1894, Collins was moved to the outfield by the Bisons. He batted .352 with nine home runs in 125 games, and after the season his contract was purchased by the Boston Beaneaters for $500.

=== Major league debut ===
Collins began his major league career as a right fielder, playing ten games at the position with the Beaneaters in 1895. On May 19, 1895, he was loaned to the Louisville Colonels, again for $500. He was soon made the team's starting third baseman, batting .279 over the remainder of the season. His larger impact was on defense, where he played in on the grass rather than back to cut down on the number of bunt hits.

=== National League star ===
Collins was returned to the Beaneaters after the 1895 season. Joe Harrington was the club's starting third baseman at the beginning of the season, but Collins soon asserted himself as the starter, and Harrington was released in July.

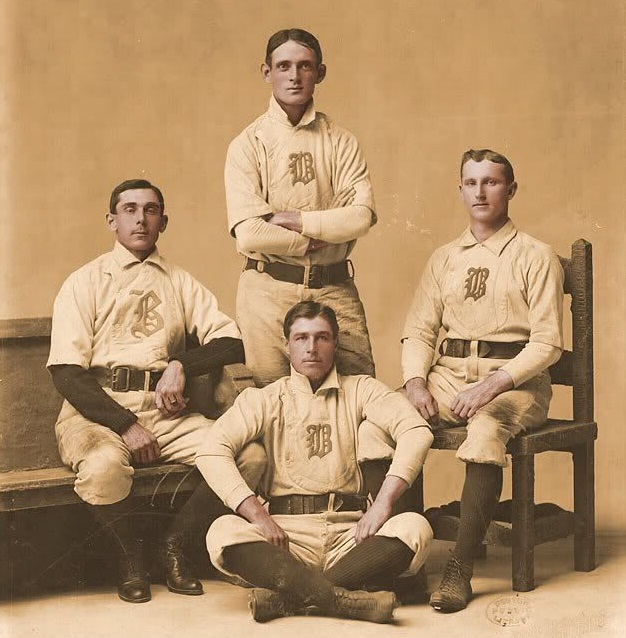
Jimmy Collins (center, below) with infielders Bobby Lowe, Fred Tenney and Herman Long.

Collins asserted himself as a skilled player in 1897 when he held a .346 batting average and knocked in 132 runs. He led the league in both putouts and assists as well, a feat he would duplicate in 1900. He followed with an equally impressive 1898 season, in which he hit .328—seventh in the league—drove in 111 runs and belted a league-high 15 home runs.

=== Jumping to the American League ===
Following the 1900 season, Collins, who was by now regarded as the best third baseman in the game, was offered the manager's job with the Boston Americans of the new American League. He accepted the job, which came with a salary of $5,500, a $3,500 signing bonus, and a cut of the team's profits, despite efforts by Beaneaters owner Arthur Soden to keep him. The two traded accusations in the press, and Collins went further, accusing National League owners of conspiring to hold down salaries, stating "I would not go back now if they offered me the whole outfit." Collins recruited other National League stars for the Americans' roster, including Cy Young, and in his first season as player-manager guided the team to a second-place finish, four games behind the Chicago White Sox.

=== First World Series ===
In 1902, Collins was limited to 108 games by injury, and the Americans finished third. He did hit the team's first ever inside-the-park grand slam home run. The next season, Collins led the Americans to their first American League pennant, winning the league by 14 1/2 games over the Philadelphia Athletics.

With an agreement in place for the champions of the American and National Leagues to meet in a best-of-nine "World Series", Boston represented the Junior Circuit. After losing two out of three at home to start the series, then losing the first game in Pittsburgh, the Americans won the next three in Pittsburgh, then returned home to win Game Eight in Boston to become the first-ever World Series Champions. Collins himself batted .250 in the Series, with a pair of triples and five runs scored.

=== Remaining career ===
The Americans won the pennant again in 1904, with Collins batting .271 and leading the league in putouts for the fifth time in eight seasons. However, the Americans would not get the opportunity to defend their title, as John McGraw and the New York Giants refused to play them in the postseason. Collins was instead presented by the Boston fans during the final series of the season with a loving cup to honor him as "a great third baseman, a great captain and a good fellow."

In 1905, the Americans slipped to fourth place, and Collins clashed with team president John I. Taylor, reportedly quitting on the team during the season. As a player, Collins batted .276, but again missed time due to injury. In 1906, Collins found himself in hot water, as not only were the Americans in last, but he himself was suspended twice, and was eventually replaced as manager by Chick Stahl. He also missed the end of the season with a knee injury.

Collins began the 1907 season with Boston, but it was only a matter of time before he departed. For reasons that have never become clear, Stahl had committed suicide during spring training; instead of Collins, the Americans turned to Cy Young as manager, following by George Huff, and then Bob Unglaub, all within the first three months of the season. After playing 41 games with the Americans, Collins was traded to the Philadelphia Athletics in June for infielder John Knight. While he batted .278, he had a career-low (to that point) .330 slugging percentage, and failed to hit a home run for the first time in his career. In 1908, he slumped even further, batting just .217, and was let go.

After his major league career ended, Collins continued to play and manage in the minor leagues. He spent 1909 with the Minneapolis Millers of the American Association, then spent two seasons with the Providence Grays in the Eastern League before retiring.

== Honors ==
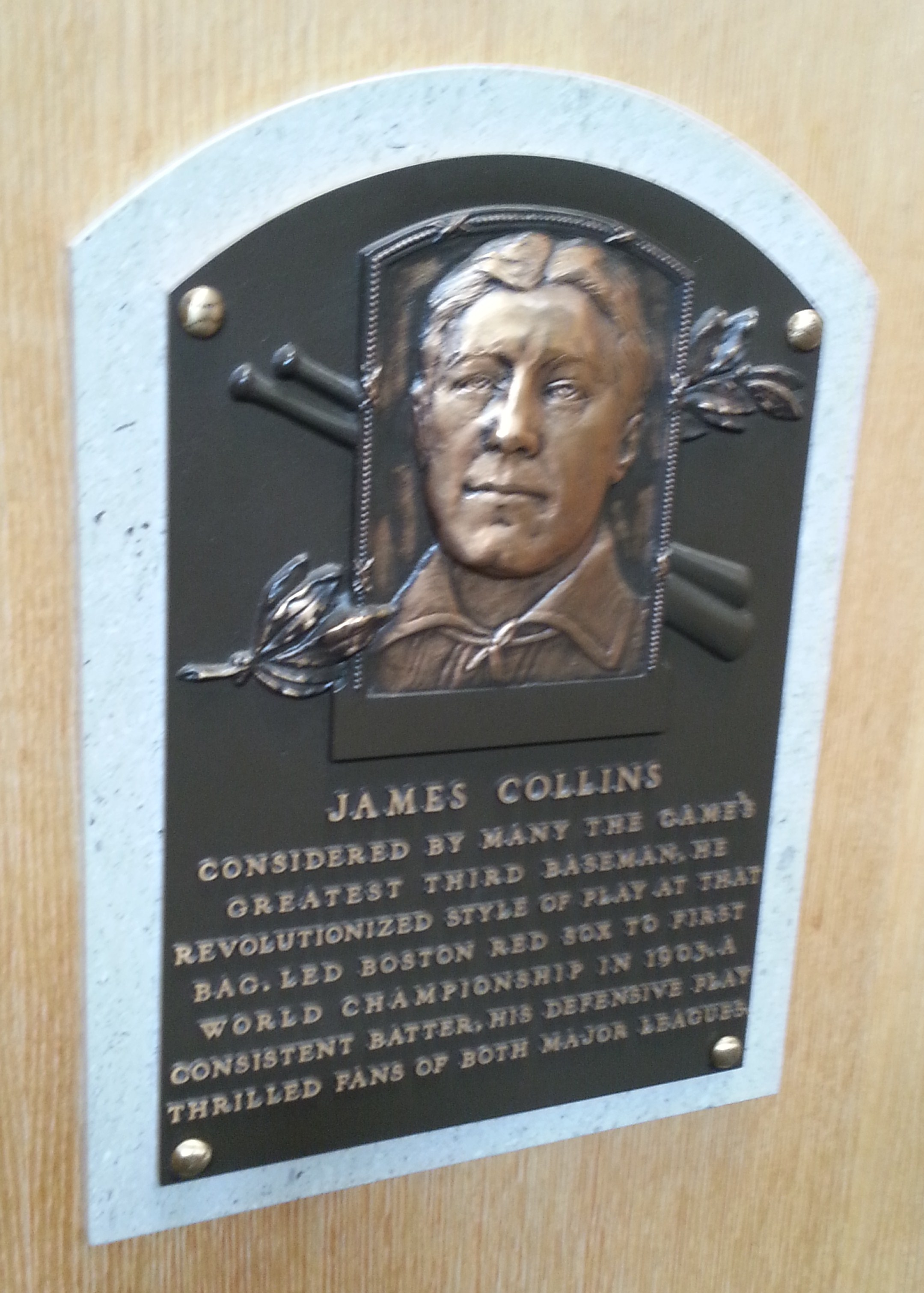
Collins' plaque at the Baseball Hall of Fame

When Collins was inducted into the Hall of Fame in 1945, he was the first to be chosen primarily as a third baseman. In 1981, Lawrence Ritter and Donald Honig included him in their book The 100 Greatest Baseball Players of All Time. Collins became a charter member of the Buffalo Baseball Hall of Fame in 1985.

== Managerial record ==
Team	Year	Regular season					Postseason			
Team	Year	Games	Won	Lost	Win %	Finish	Won	Lost	Win %	Result
BOA	1901	136	79	57	.581	2nd in AL	–	–	–	–
BOA	1902	137	77	60	.562	3rd in AL	–	–	–	–
BOA	1903	70	40	30	.571	1st in AL	5	3	.625	Won World Series (PIT)
BOA	1904	153	91	62	.595	1st in AL	0	0	–	World Series not played (NYG)
BOA	1905	152	78	74	.513	4th in AL	–	–	–	–
BOA	1906	114	35	79	.307	fired*	–	–	–	–
Total		831	455	376	.548		5	3	.625	

* Remained as a player only

== Personal life ==
Jimmy Collins married Sarah Murphy in 1907, and the couple had three daughters, though their first died at a very young age. After his retirement from baseball, they moved back to Buffalo, where Collins worked for the Buffalo Parks Department as the head of the Municipal League. Collins died of pneumonia on March 6, 1943, at the age of 73.

== In popular culture ==
Boston-based Celtic punk band Dropkick Murphys recorded the song "Jimmy Collins' Wake" on their 2013 album Signed and Sealed in Blood. The song, originally written by Richard Johnson, recounts Collins' wake in Buffalo, New York.

== See also ==
- Boston Red Sox Hall of Fame
- List of Major League Baseball career triples leaders
- List of Major League Baseball career runs scored leaders
- List of Major League Baseball career stolen bases leaders
- List of Major League Baseball annual home run leaders
- List of Major League Baseball player-managers
