= Wilbert Robinson =

American baseball player and manager (1864–1934)

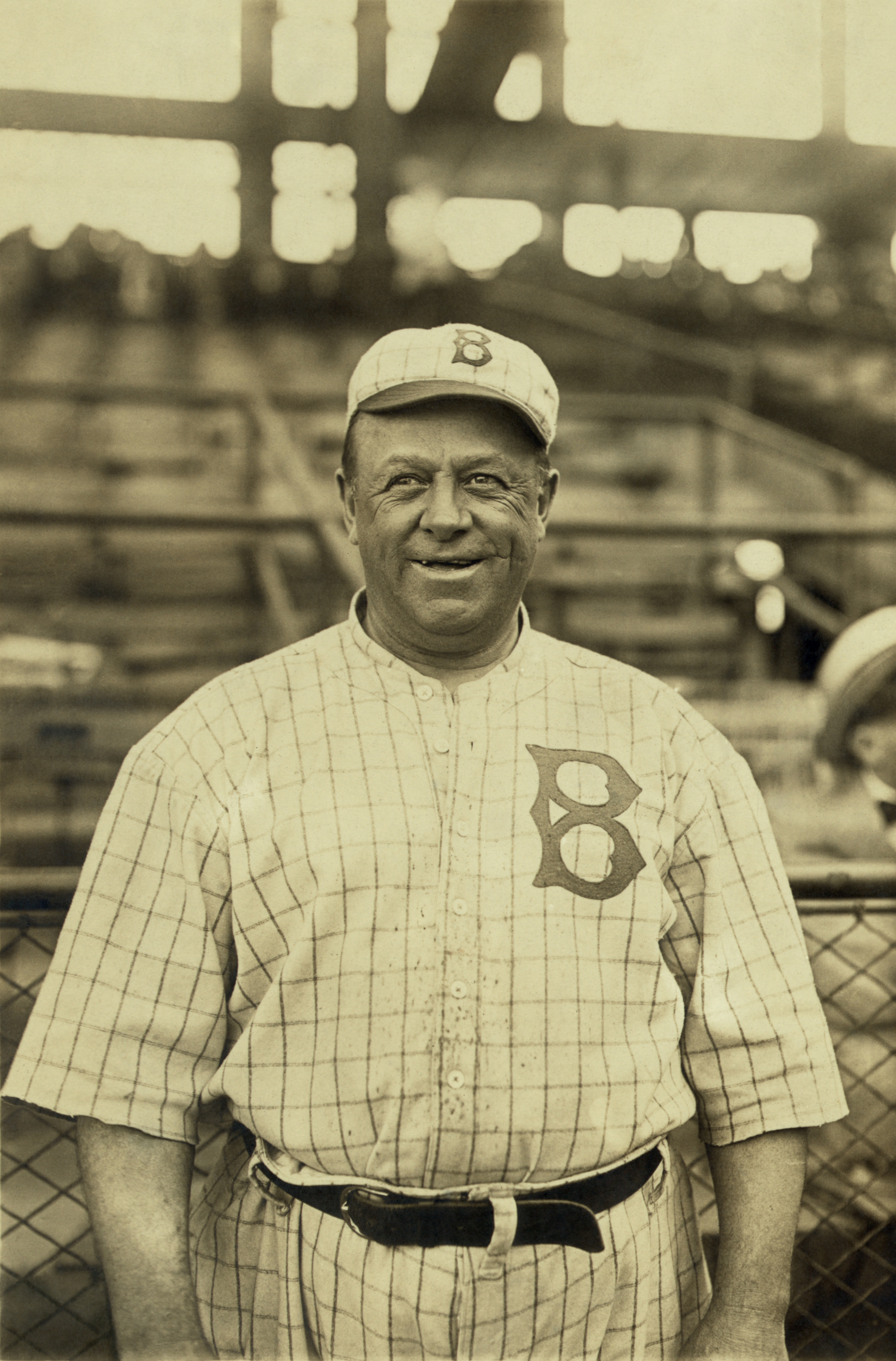
- Robinson in 1916
- Catcher / Manager
- Born: June 29, 1864; Bolton, Massachusetts, U.S.
- Died: August 8, 1934 (aged 70); Atlanta, Georgia, U.S.
- Batted: Right Threw: Right

MLB debut
- April 19, 1886, for the Philadelphia Athletics

Last MLB appearance
- September 29, 1902, for the Baltimore Orioles

MLB statistics
- Batting average: .273
- Home runs: 18
- Runs batted in: 722
- Managerial record: 1,399–1,398–21
- Winning %: .500
- Stats at Baseball Reference
- Managerial record at Baseball Reference

Teams
- As player: Philadelphia Athletics (1886–1890); Baltimore Orioles (AA/NL) (1890–1899); St. Louis Cardinals (1900); Baltimore Orioles (AL) (1901–1902); As manager: Baltimore Orioles (AL) (1902); Brooklyn Robins (1914–1931)

Member of the National

Baseball Hall of Fame
- Induction: 1945
- Election method: Old-Timers Committee

Wilbert Robinson (June 29, 1864 – August 8, 1934), nicknamed "Uncle Robbie", was an American catcher, coach and manager in Major League Baseball (MLB). He played in MLB for the Philadelphia Athletics, Baltimore Orioles, and St. Louis Cardinals. As a player, he played 1,371 games, primarily with Baltimore that saw him take part of three consecutive teams that won the National League pennant from 1894 to 1896.

In the final season of his playing career in 1902, he was named player-manager of the Orioles for 81 games. In 1914, he was hired to manage the Brooklyn Robins. In seventeen seasons with the team, he managed the team to two National League pennants and ultimately finished his career with 1,399 wins in 2,818 games. Robinson was inducted into the Baseball Hall of Fame in 1945.

== Life and playing career ==
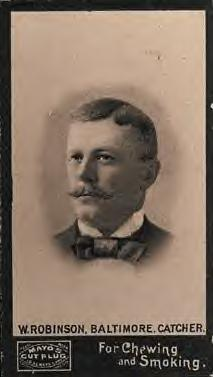
1895 Baseball Card

Born in Bolton, Massachusetts, Robinson was a catcher in the minor New England League in 1885 and made it to the major leagues in 1886 with the Philadelphia Athletics of the American Association, where he remained until 1890. He lasted in the majors until 1902, playing much of his career with two separate Baltimore Orioles franchises – from 1890 to 1899 with the Orioles team which folded after the 1899 National League season, and in 1901–02 with the American League team which moved to New York City in 1903 and became the Yankees. He also spent one season, 1900, with the St. Louis Cardinals.

Over the course of his career, Robinson played 1,316 games as a catcher, which prepared him for his second baseball career as a manager. The star catcher of the Orioles dynasty, which won three straight titles from 1894 to 1896, he compiled a career batting average of .273, with a peak of .353 in the heavy-hitting season of 1894. Durable behind the plate, he caught a triple-header in 1896, followed by a double-header the following day. He also was the first catcher to play directly behind the batter at all times, as the previous practice had been to play farther back when there were fewer than two strikes. A highlight of his career was a seven-hit game June 10, 1892. He also batted in 11 runs in that game; on September 16, 1924, as manager of the Brooklyn Dodgers, he saw that record eclipsed as Jim Bottomley of the St. Louis Cardinals batted in 12 runs. (Robinson, whose team was in contention for the pennant at the time, lamented, "Why did he have to save all those hits for us? Couldn't he have made some of them against [Giants manager] McGraw?")

== Managerial career ==
=== Baltimore and New York ===
Robinson and McGraw joined as business partners in the Baltimore Orioles, a team that would debut in the new American League (AL) in 1901. McGraw served as player-manager of the AL Orioles in 1901 and the beginning of the 1902 season, at which point he departed to the New York Giants. There were rumblings of a move to New York City to counter the Giants to help the fledgling League before the season had started, but nothing came to pass yet. The 1902 season was the last for the Orioles in the American League. Robinson took over after McGraw had gone 26–31 to manage the last 83 games. He won 24 while losing 57 (with two ties). The team had been plagued by the debt suffered by owner John Mahon. Andrew Freedman and John T. Brush, principal owners of the Giants and Cincinnati Reds, respectively, purchased the team and raided the roster by releasing certain players to be claimed by the two teams. A.L. President Ban Johnson seized control of the Orioles not long after and loaned several players from other A.L. teams, but the damage was done. After the season, McGraw enticed Robinson to be his pitching coach from 1903 to 1913 (although he would also do some coaching at third base), during which time the Giants won five NL pennants and a World Series title in 1905. As for the Orioles, they moved to New York for 1903. An argument between the two after the 1913 World Series over alleged bad coaching by either man in a saloon (meant to reunite old Oriole teammates) meant the beginning of a feud between the two that never formally healed, and Robinson left to manage Brooklyn in 1914.

=== Brooklyn Dodgers ===
In 1914, Robinson took over the National League Brooklyn franchise. The team was known by various nicknames, including Bridegrooms, Superbas, and Dodgers, but during Robinson's managerial tenure, which lasted until 1931, the club was as often referred to as the "Robins" in honor of their manager, who had acquired the nickname "Uncle Robbie." (The frequently error-prone Dodger teams of this era were also sometimes derisively known as "Uncle Robbie's Daffiness Boys.") The Dodgers had finished the previous year with a 65-84 record that was buoyed by stars such as Zack Wheat and Jake Daubert (with the latter having won the National League's MVP award). Robinson would lead them to a 75-79 record in 1914, 19 1/2 games behind first while finishing 5th for the first time since 1907. He followed it up with an 80-72-2 second season that had them finish third in the League while acquiring future Hall of Fame pitcher Rube Marquard from New York.

By the halfway point of the 1916 season, the Robins were already 15 games above .500. By the time of October, the Robins were holding firm with 91 wins and a bare lead over the Philadelphia Phillies. Facing New York for the final four-game series, they won three to clinch the pennant. It was the first time Brooklyn had won the pennant since 1900, and they would compete in their first ever World Series. They would face the Boston Red Sox, managed by Bill Carrigan, that had future Hall of Famers with Babe Ruth and Harry Hooper while making their fourth appearance in the World Series in thirteen years. The Red Sox would win the title, which was the third in four that they would win from 1912 to 1918. Marquard was outmatched in Game 1 by Ernie Shore, as Boston had a 6-1 lead before Brooklyn came close to rallying in the ninth inning, when Carl Mays was brought in to curtail a bases-loaded situation that led to Brooklyn scoring four runs but falling one run short. Boston then won Game 2 in fourteen innings, which featured no scoring for ten straight innings until Boston had a walk-off single. Brooklyn scored in the first inning of that game and promptly did not score again until the 3rd inning of the next game. Brooklyn held on to bounce back in Game 3 after nearly blowing a 4-0 lead, but Boston rallied in Game 4 with a three-run inside-the-park home run by Larry Gardner proving the difference in a 6-2 game. Game 5 featured Boston scoring four unanswered after Brooklyn had a brief lead in the second inning, as Boston won the series in five games (they batted .238 for the series, but Brooklyn batted .200). Brooklyn slumped in the next three seasons, finishing 70-81-5 for a seventh-place finish in 1917 before finishing 5th in the next two years. However, a trade for Burleigh Grimes (a fellow future Hall of Famer) in 1918 would be a helping hand soon enough. However, in 1920, he led them to a 24-game improvement with 93 wins in 155 games for a seven-game cushion over New York for Brooklyn's second pennant in four years. However, the Cleveland Indians (led by player/manager Tris Speaker) would win the World Series five games to two in a series that saw no lead changes at any point, as the team that scored first won the game, with Cleveland scoring as early as the first inning (twice) and as late as the sixth (Game 6). Brooklyn was outscored 21-8.

Robinson continued to manage the Robins for eleven more seasons, with five winning seasons in the mix. His best finish was the 1924 team, which finished 2nd with a 92-62 record while being buoyed by NL MVP Dazzy Vance, who had completed the Triple Crown in leading the NL in wins (28), strikeouts (262) and ERA (2.16). The Robins had a slow run going into August, which included being down by as many as 13 games for first on the 9th. However, the Robins went on a 13-game winning streak from August 25 to September 6, and they were tied for the NL lead three times in the month. On September 23, with four games to play, the Robins were tied for the lead with the Giants before facing the Chicago Cubs (soon tabbed to finish 5th in the standings) and the Boston Braves (the league doormat) for two games each, with Vance tabbed to start two of them (the Giants, however, had five games left to play). However, they would win and lose twice, which included a 10th inning home run off Vance by Gabby Hartnett on the 23rd that doomed the Robins. The Giants finished at 93-60 to finish 1 1/2 games in first.

The Robins also had their share of struggles, which included seven times of finishing in the second division (below 4th), including five in a row from 1925 to 1929, which coincided with Robinson serving as both manager and team president (having been named after owner Charles Ebbets had died). Robinson finished his career with two fourth-place finishes in 1930 and 1931. He closed out his career on September 27, 1931, in Ebbets Field, fittingly against McGraw and his New York Giants. Robinson's Robins won 12-3. He was replaced by Max Carey as manager while hunting at his camp in Brunswick, Georgia.

In his 18 years at the helm of the Robins, Robinson compiled a record of 1,375–1,341–19, including National League championships in 1916 and 1920 – Brooklyn's only pennants between 1901 and 1940. His 1,375 NL victories were, at the time, the 3rd-highest total in National League history, trailing only the totals of John McGraw (then with 2,652) and Fred Clarke (1,602).

Robinson was highly regarded for his ability to draw outstanding performances from his pitching staff, a result of his many years as a catcher. Among the pitchers he guided to success were Joe McGinnity with both Orioles teams and the Giants, Rube Marquard with the Giants, and Dazzy Vance and Burleigh Grimes with the Dodgers. Another pitcher who would later recall Robinson's excellent advice, although they never played together during a regular season, was John Tener, who in the 1910s served simultaneously as NL president and Governor of Pennsylvania.

Robinson was manager when Al López started as a catcher in the majors, as Lopez made his debut in 1928 before becoming a regular in 1930, who spent the first six seasons of a 19-year career with Brooklyn. Robinson watched Lopez's style and finally hollered, "Tell that punk he got two hands to catch with! Never mind the Fancy Dan stuff." Lopez went on to eventually surpass Robinson in the number of games played as catcher (1,316) and in the most games caught at 1,918 in 1945. That record was not broken for four decades; in 1951, Lopez became a manager and won two pennants and 1,410 games in seventeen seasons, which led to his induction into the Hall of Fame.

== Managerial record ==
Team	Year	Regular season					Postseason			
Team	Year	Games	Won	Lost	Win %	Finish	Won	Lost	Win %	Result
BAL	1902	81	24	57	.296	8th in AL	–	–	–	–
BAL total		81	24	57	.296		0	0	–	
BKN	1914	154	75	79	.487	5th in NL	–	–	–	–
BKN	1915	152	80	72	.526	3rd in NL	–	–	–	–
BKN	1916	154	94	60	.610	1st in NL	1	4	.200	Lost World Series (BOS)
BKN	1917	151	70	81	.464	7th in NL	–	–	–	–
BKN	1918	126	57	69	.452	5th in NL	–	–	–	–
BKN	1919	140	69	71	.493	5th in NL	–	–	–	–
BKN	1920	154	93	61	.604	1st in NL	2	5	.286	Lost World Series (CLE)
BKN	1921	152	77	75	.507	5th in NL	–	–	–	–
BKN	1922	154	76	78	.494	6th in NL	–	–	–	–
BKN	1923	154	76	78	.494	6th in NL	–	–	–	–
BKN	1924	154	92	62	.597	2nd in NL	–	–	–	–
BKN	1925	153	68	85	.444	7th in NL	–	–	–	–
BKN	1926	153	71	82	.464	6th in NL	–	–	–	–
BKN	1927	153	65	88	.425	6th in NL	–	–	–	–
BKN	1928	153	77	76	.503	6th in NL	–	–	–	–
BKN	1929	153	70	83	.458	6th in NL	–	–	–	–
BKN	1930	154	86	68	.558	4th in NL	–	–	–	–
BKN	1931	152	79	73	.520	4th in NL	–	–	–	–
BKN total		2,716	1375	1341	.506		3	9	.250	
Total		2,818 (Note: Robinson also managed in 21 games that ended in ties)	1399	1398	.500		3	9	.250	

== Retirement and death ==
After he retired from managing, Robinson became the president of the Atlanta Crackers minor league team. He suffered a fall in his hotel room in August 1934, resulting in a broken arm and a head injury. On August 8, he suffered a brain hemorrhage and died in Atlanta, Georgia at the age of 70. He was buried in the New Cathedral Cemetery in Baltimore. His resting place is located near the grave of John McGraw, who had died in February of that year.

== Family ==
Robinson's brother, Fred Robinson, also played briefly in the majors, appearing in 3 games for the 1884 Cincinnati Outlaw Reds of the Union Association.

== Legacy ==
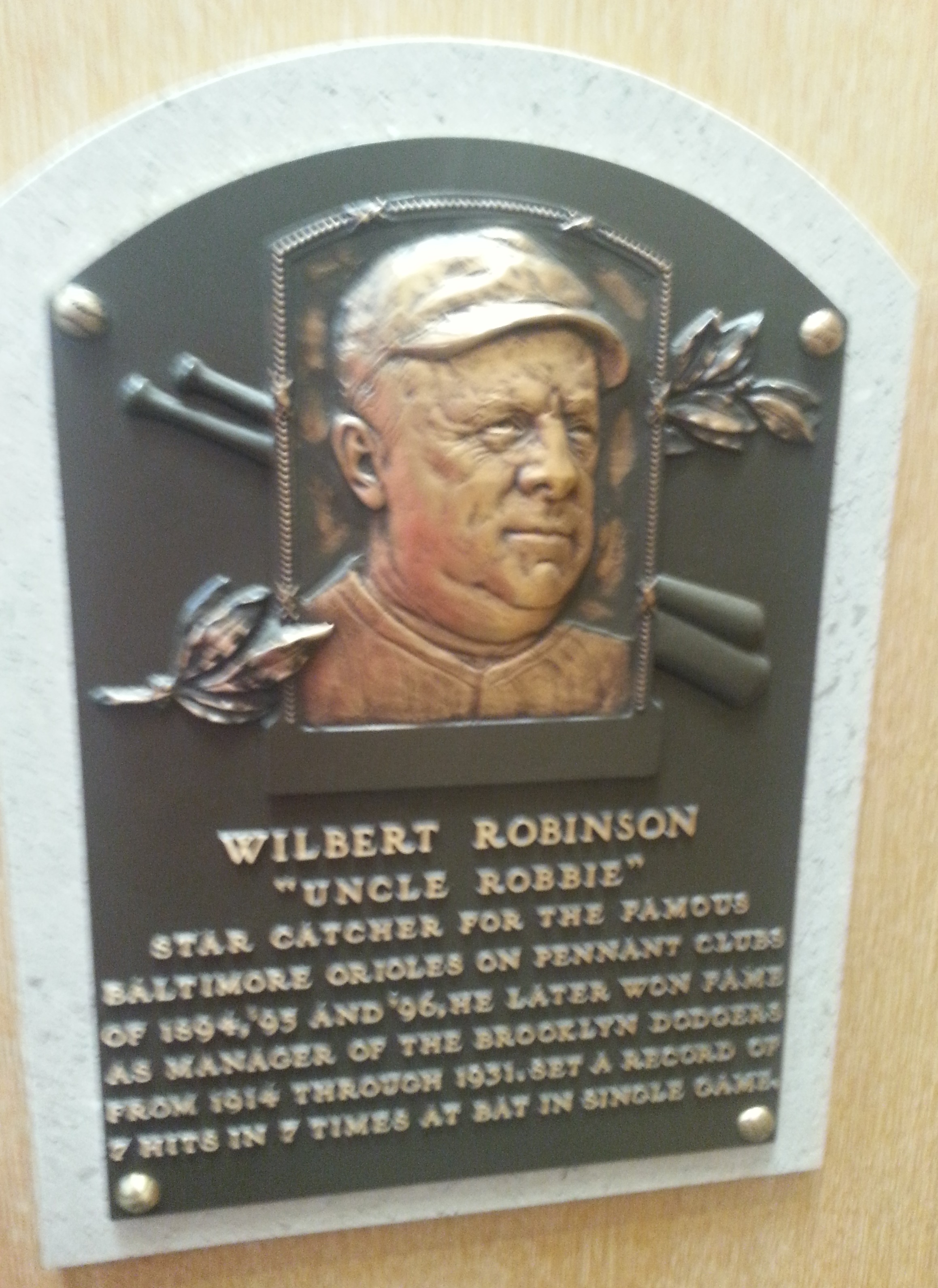
Plaque of Wilbert Robinson at the Baseball Hall of Fame

Robinson was elected to the Baseball Hall of Fame in 1945 by the Old-Timers Committee. One reporter had described him as a "Rule-of-thumb manager, a gentle Falstaff, who could get more out of less material than any manager before or since." Noted baseball analyst Bill James, looking at all elected managers in the Hall of Fame based on meeting expectations in regards to record, described his election as "capricious".

=== Robinson and Ruth Law ===
On March 13, 1915, at spring training in Daytona Beach, Florida, Robinson decided to try to set a record of sorts by catching a baseball dropped from an airplane being flown 525 feet (160 m) overhead, being inspired by aviator Ruth Law's penchant for dropping golf balls from the plane onto the nearby golf course. This was not the first stunt involving catching a fly ball from a considerable distance, as Gabby Street had caught a ball dropped from the Washington Monument on August 21, 1908, after 14 misses. Law and team trainer Fred Kelly would be on the plane for the stunt. However, Law had somehow forgotten to bring the baseball and instead dropped a grapefruit, which splattered all over the manager. (Note: A contemporaneous account, published in The Daytona Daily News on March 17, 1915, reported that Robinson misjudged the catch, resulting in the grapefruit hitting him on the arm.) The grapefruit made such a mess that Robinson thought he had lost his eye because of the acid and the bloodlike splatter that covered him, and he began screaming before his teammates began to laugh at the sight of a grapefruit-covered teammate and he realized that it was a joke. From this point on, Robinson referred to airplanes as fruit flies, and according to legend, it is the reason that the spring training Grapefruit League got its nickname.

== See also ==
- List of Major League Baseball career stolen bases leaders
- List of Major League Baseball runs batted in records
- List of Major League Baseball managers with most career wins
- List of Major League Baseball player-managers
- List of Major League Baseball single-game hits leaders

== Popular culture ==
- R. M. Stults dedicated the song Our Orioles March to Capt. Robinson in 1894.
