= Fielding error =

Baseball statistic

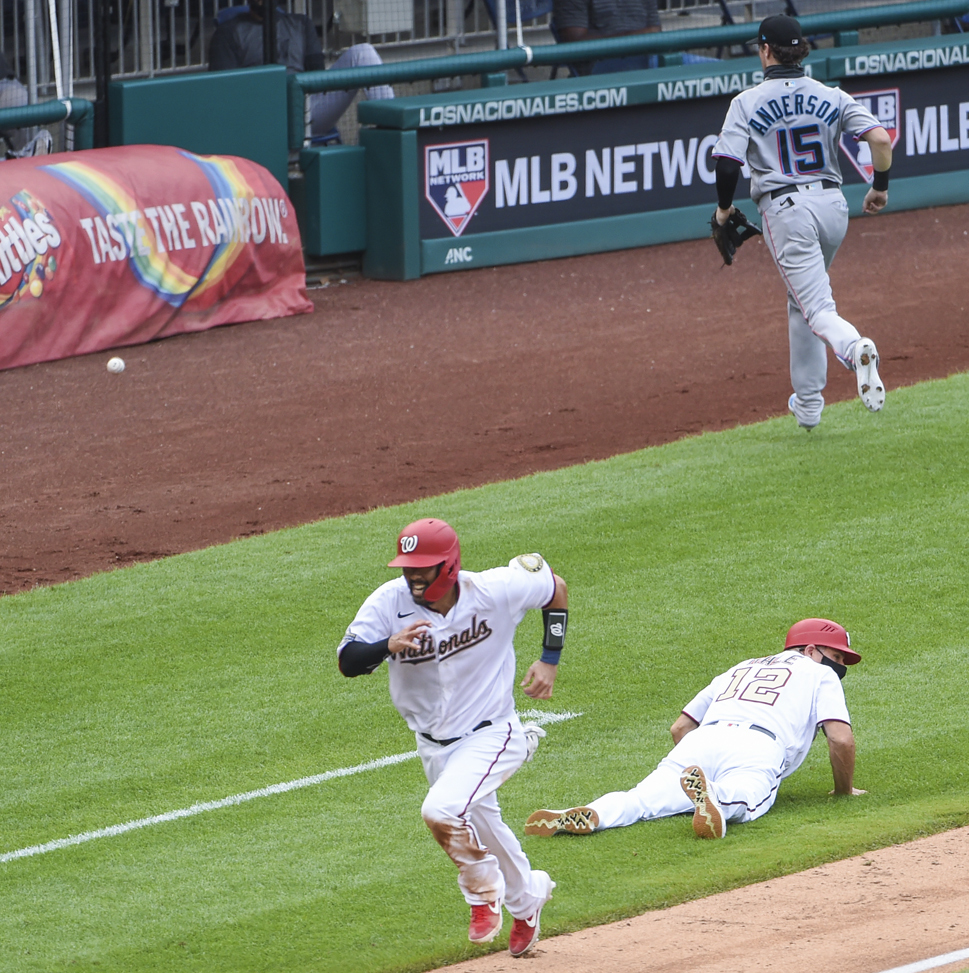
Kurt Suzuki scores while Brian Anderson (background) chases down a throwing error made by a teammate

In baseball and softball statistics, an error is an act, in the judgment of the official scorer, of a fielder misplaying a ball in a manner that allows a batter or baserunner to advance one or more bases or allows a plate appearance to continue after the batter should have been put out. The term error is sometimes used to refer to the play during which an error was committed.

== Relationship to other statistical categories ==
An error that allows a batter to reach first base does not count as a hit but still counts as an at bat for the batter unless, in the scorer's judgment, the batter would have reached first base safely but one or more of the additional bases reached was the result of the fielder's mistake. In that case, the play will be scored both as a hit (for the number of bases the fielders should have limited the batter to) and an error.

However, if a batter is judged to have reached base solely because of a fielder's mistake, it is scored as a "reach on error (ROE)," and treated the same as if the batter had been put out, hence lowering his batting average.

Similarly, a batter does not receive credit for a run batted in (RBI) when runs score on an error, unless the scorer rules that a run would have scored even if the fielder had not made a mistake. For example, if a batter hits a ball to the outfield for what should be a sacrifice fly and the outfielder drops the ball for an error, the batter will still receive credit for the sacrifice fly and the run batted in.

If a play should have resulted in a fielder's choice with a runner being put out and the batter reaching base safely but the runner is safe due to an error, the play will be scored as a fielder's choice, with no hit being awarded to the batter and an error charged against the fielder.

Passed balls and wild pitches are separate statistical categories and are not scored as errors.

If a batted ball were hit on the fly into foul territory, with the batting team having no runners on base, and a fielder misplayed such ball for an error, it is possible for a team on the winning side of a perfect game to commit at least one error, yet still qualify as a perfect game.

There is a curious loophole in the rules on errors for catchers. If a catcher makes a "wild throw" in an attempt to prevent a stolen base and the runner is safe, the catcher is not charged with an error even if it could be argued that the runner would have been put out with "ordinary effort." There is therefore a "no fault" condition for the catcher attempting to prevent a steal. However, when considering that the majority of stolen base attempts are successful (around 2 successes per failure), this "no fault rule" is understandable due to the difficulty of throwing out runners. If the runner takes an additional base due to the wild throw, an error is charged for that advance. The other scenario where catchers may be given an error unrelated to fielding a ball in play is catcher’s interference, when the catcher's glove is hit by the bat during the swing. The catcher is not given an error in that scenario if the batter gets a hit off the play.

If a run scores by the end of the inning that would not have scored in the absence of the error, the run is categorized as unearned, meaning that it is not treated in the statistics as having been the responsibility of the pitcher.

== Statistical significance ==
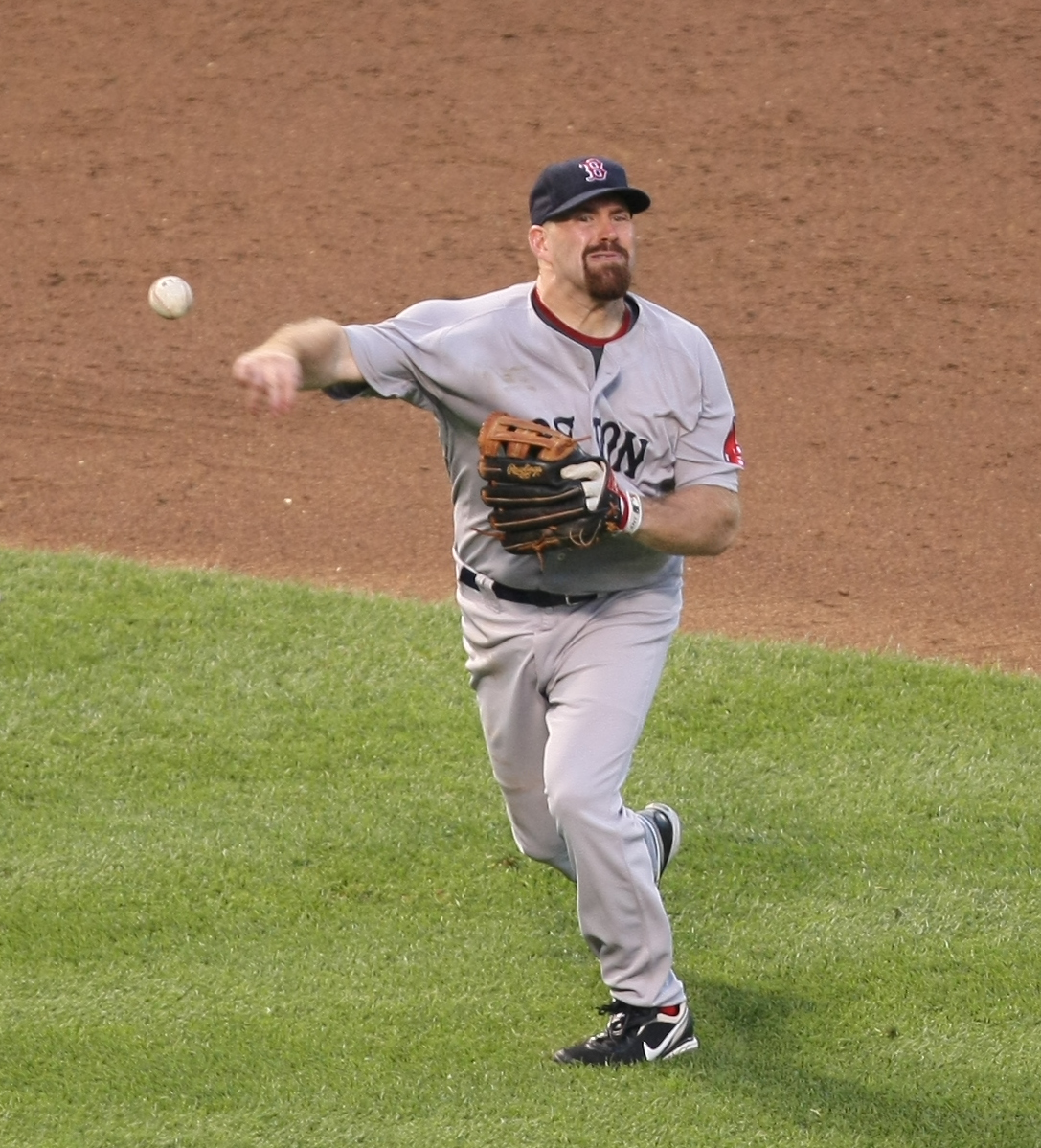
Kevin Youkilis played 1,094 innings at first base during the 2007 season without committing an error.

Traditionally, the number of errors was a statistic used to quantify the skill of a fielder. Research has shown that the error rate is higher when the quality of fielding is suspect, e.g., the performance of an expansion team in its first year, or the fielding done by replacement players during World War II, and is lower when playing conditions are better, e.g. on artificial turf and during night games.

However, fans and analysts have questioned the usefulness and significance of errors as a metric for fielding skill. Notably, mental misjudgments, such as failure to cover a base or attempting a force out when such a play is not available, are not considered errors.

A more subtle, though more significant objection to the error, as sabermetricians have noted, is more conceptual. In order for a fielder to be charged with an error, he must have done something right by being in the correct place to be able to attempt the play. A poor fielder may "avoid" many errors simply by being unable to reach batted or thrown balls that a better fielder could successfully reach. Thus, it is possible that a poor fielder will have fewer errors than any fielder with higher expectancies.

In recent times, official scorers have made some attempt to take a fielder's supposed "extraordinary" effort or positioning into account when judging whether the play should have been successful given ordinary effort. However, this still leaves statistics, such as fielding percentage, that are based on errors as a way to compare the defensive abilities of players.

Errors also hold significance in calculating the earned run average (ERA) of a pitcher. Runs scored due to an error are unearned and do not count toward a pitcher's ERA.

== Statistical records for errors ==
In Major League Baseball (MLB), Herman Long holds the record with 1,096 career errors; he played from 1889 to 1904. Bill Dahlen, Deacon White, and Germany Smith are the only other players to commit at least 1,000 errors during their MLB careers. All of these players played at least one season before 1900. The 20th century record is held by Rabbit Maranville, with 711 errors. Among active players, Brandon Crawford, who has won four Gold Glove Awards, leads with 174 errors.

=== Pitchers ===
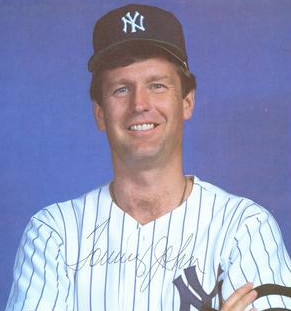
Tommy John is one of four pitchers who committed three errors in a single inning.

The major league record for errors by a pitcher in a career is held by Hippo Vaughn, with 64 errors. That also is the National League record. The American League career record is held by Ed Walsh. The most errors committed by a pitcher in a season is 28 by Jim Whitney, which also is the National League record. The American League record of 15 is held by three pitchers, Jack Chesbro, Rube Waddell, and Ed Walsh. The record for most errors committed by a pitcher in one inning is three, first set by Cy Seymour in 1898. That feat was matched by Tommy John in 1988, Jaime Navarro in 1996, and Mike Sirotka in 1999.

=== Catchers ===
Ivey Wingo holds the major league and National League records for most errors committed by a catcher, with 234. He committed 59 errors while playing for the Cardinals and 175 for the Reds. The American League record is held by Wally Schang, who committed 218 errors playing for five teams. Mike Redmond's streak of 253 games without an error between 2004 and 2010 set a new MLB record for catchers.

=== First basemen ===
The MLB and National League records for errors by a first baseman is held by Cap Anson, who committed 568 errors. Hal Chase holds the American League record with 285, 240 for the New York Highlanders and 40 for the Chicago White Sox. Anson also holds the single season record for most errors by a first baseman 58 while Steve Garvey holds the record for fewest in season, with zero.

=== Second basemen ===
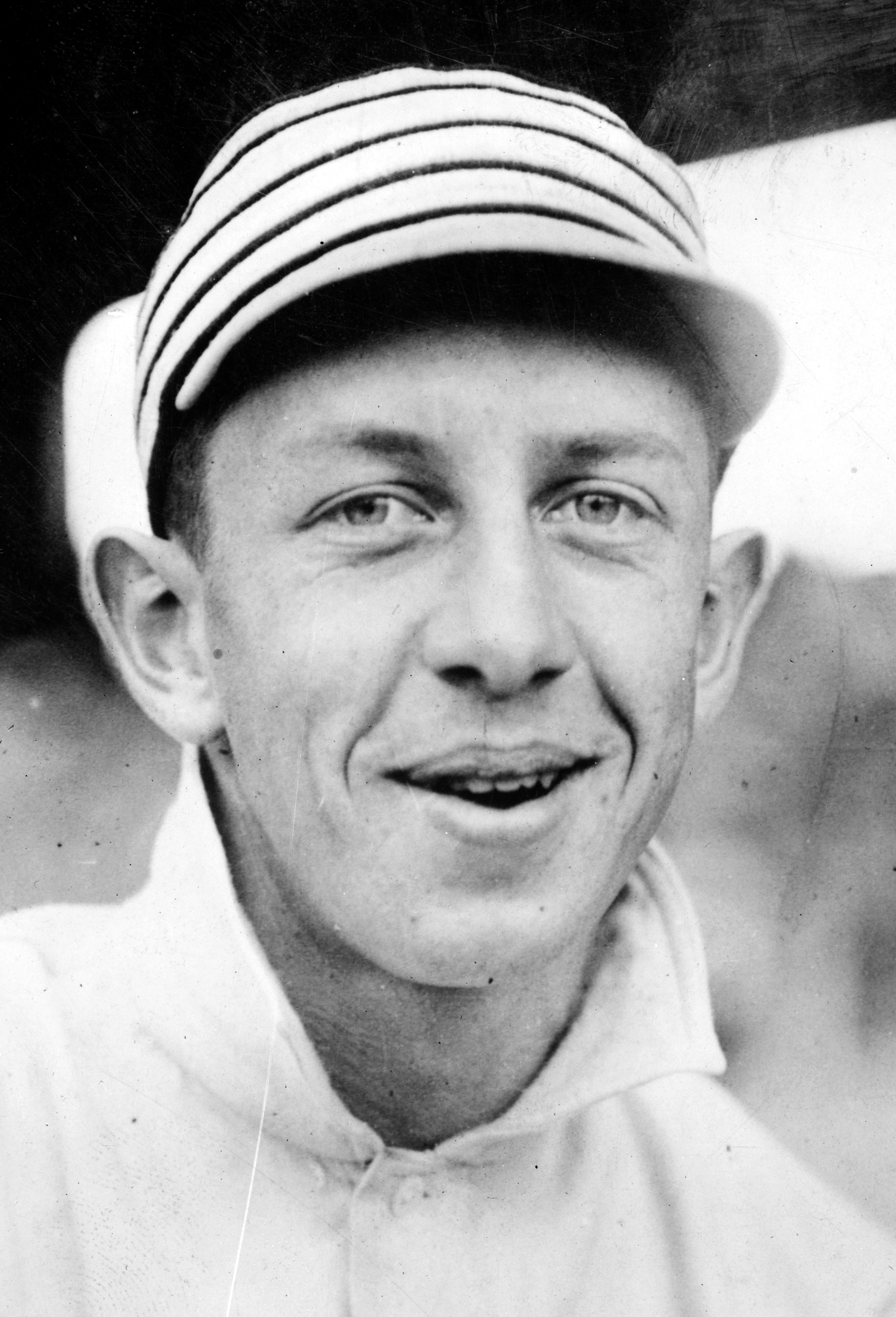
Hall of Famer Eddie Collins holds the American League record for most career errors by a second baseman.

Fred Pfeffer holds the MLB and National League records for most errors committed by a second baseman, with 857 and 781, respectively. The American League record is 435, held by Hall of Famer Eddie Collins.

=== Third basemen ===
Jerry Denny holds the MLB and National League records for most errors by third basemen in a career with 533. Jimmy Austin holds the American League record with 359.

=== Shortstops ===
Long committed 1,070 errors at shortstop, which included games in the American League, National League, and American Association. He is also the only player to commit more than 1,000 errors at one position.

Bill Dahlen holds the National League record for shortstops, with 975 errors in 20 seasons. He committed 443 errors with the Chicago Cubs, 260 with the Brooklyn Dodgers, 200 with the New York Giants and 72 with the Boston Braves. He also committed 89 errors as a third baseman, and eight errors at both second base and as an outfielder, for a total of 1,080 errors in his career.

Donie Bush holds the American League record, with 689 errors. He committed 682 errors with the Detroit Tigers, and recorded 7 with the Washington Senators.

=== Outfielders ===
Nineteenth-century player Tom Brown established the MLB record with 490 errors committed as an outfielder. He racked up 222 errors in the American Association, 238 in the National League, and 30 in the Players' League. Brown also committed six errors as a pitcher, for a total of 496 errors in his career. The National League record is held by 19th-century player George Gore with 346 errors and the American League record by Ty Cobb with 271.

== See also ==
- List of Major League Baseball career fielding errors leaders
