= Herman Long (baseball) =

American baseball player (1866–1909)

- Long in 1903
- Shortstop
- Born: April 13, 1866; Chicago, Illinois, U.S.
- Died: September 16, 1909 (aged 43); Denver, Colorado, U.S.
- Batted: Left Threw: Right

MLB debut
- April 17, 1889, for the Kansas City Cowboys

Last MLB appearance
- July 13, 1904, for the Philadelphia Phillies

MLB statistics
- Batting average: .277
- Hits: 2,129
- Home runs: 91
- Runs batted in: 1,055
- Stolen bases: 537
- Stats at Baseball Reference

Teams
- Kansas City Cowboys (1889); Boston Beaneaters (1890–1902); New York Highlanders (1903); Detroit Tigers (1903); Philadelphia Phillies (1904)

Career highlights and awards
- NL home run leader (1900); Braves Hall of Fame

Herman C. Long (April 13, 1866 – September 16, 1909) was an American shortstop in Major League Baseball (MLB) who played for the Kansas City Cowboys, Boston Beaneaters, New York Highlanders, Detroit Tigers, and Philadelphia Phillies. Long was known for his great fielding range as a shortstop, but he also holds the MLB career record for errors.

== Early life ==
Born in 1866, Long was a native of Chicago. His parents are thought to have been German immigrants, as Long spoke fluent German. Little else is known about Long's life up until he began playing minor league baseball in 1887 for a team in Arkansas City, Kansas. He played in Kansas City in 1888. After that season, the Kansas City team merged with the major league team in the same city.

== Major League Baseball career ==
Long played for the Kansas City Cowboys (1889), Boston Beaneaters (1890–1902), New York Highlanders (1903), Detroit Tigers (1903), and Philadelphia Phillies (1904). From 1889 to 1902, he played over 100 games every year, had a batting average over .300 four times, and had an OPS+ over 100 seven times. He led the NL in runs scored in 1893 with 149, and he led the NL in home runs in 1900 with 12. Long helped the Beaneaters win National League championships in 1891, 1892, 1893, 1897, and 1898. During his time with the Beaneaters, he played in the infield along with first baseman Fred Tenney, second baseman Bobby Lowe, and third baseman Jimmy Collins; some considered that to be the greatest infield in baseball history. Between 1904 and 1906, Long was a player and player-manager in minor league baseball.

Long twice hit for the cycle, in 1896 and 1900, the first player in the Braves franchise to accomplish the feat. It was not matched for 121 years, until first baseman Freddie Freeman hit his second cycle during the 2021 season. (Note: Despite limited game logs during the 1900 season, research by the Elias Sports Bureau has verified an uncredited cycle to Herman Long.)

Tim Murnane, a former player-turned-baseball writer, wrote in 1894, "Long is the most brilliant ball player on the field at the present time." In 1903, future Hall of Fame pitcher Kid Nichols said of Long, "Herman Long is the greatest shortstop of them all. You can speak of your [Hughie] Jennings, and write of your [Jack] Glasscocks all you want, but this man Long at his best had them beat by a city block. Jennings was a brilliant ball player, and without doubt one of the leading players of the age, but this talk of his being better than Herman Long is all rot."

In the 2001 book The New Bill James Historical Baseball Abstract, writer Bill James ranked Long as the 34th greatest shortstop of all-time. Long is the Braves' all-time leader with 434 stolen bases.

=== Fielding ===
Long holds the major league record for most errors in a career with 1,096. Only three other players have made more than 1,000 errors in their careers: Bill Dahlen, Deacon White, and Germany Smith. Of these four, White is in the Baseball Hall of Fame and Dahlen has been nominated for induction several times. Long's total includes a record 1,070 errors committed while playing shortstop, making him the only player to commit more than 1,000 errors at one position. Despite the errors, Long fielded slightly better than the league average for a shortstop during his career, and he was considered an excellent fielder by his contemporaries. He led National League shortstops in fielding percentage in 1901 and 1902.

The seeming contradiction between a high number of errors and exceptional fielding skill is attributable to the fact that Long had a greater fielding range than most shortstops. He could get to balls batted to his left and right that other fielders would not have reached; a certain percentage of these difficult plays were mishandled, resulting in Long being charged with errors on grounders and flies that less mobile shortstops would not have touched (and on which they would not be charged with errors).

Another key factor contributing to Long's relatively large total of career errors was the relative abundance of errors in 19th century professional baseball. In a typical game played in the 1800s, each team committed about ten errors (for a one-game combined total of about 20). The number of errors in MLB games declined throughout the 20th century, with less than one error per game in 2023.

== Death ==
In August 1909, The New York Times reported that Long was very sick. Several months earlier, he had moved to Denver, Colorado, because he was suffering from a lung condition. He died of tuberculosis the next month in Denver.

== See also ==
- List of Major League Baseball career hits leaders
- List of Major League Baseball career runs scored leaders
- List of Major League Baseball career runs batted in leaders
- List of Major League Baseball career stolen bases leaders
- List of Major League Baseball annual home run leaders
- List of Major League Baseball annual runs scored leaders
- List of Major League Baseball players to hit for the cycle

== Notes ==
Achievements
Preceded by Ed Cartwright	Hitting for the cycle May 9, 1896	Succeeded by Bill Joyce
