= List of Major League Baseball career fielding errors leaders =

Herman Long, the all-time leader in fielding errors.

In baseball statistics, an error is an act, in the judgment of the official scorer, of a fielder misplaying a ball in a manner that allows a batter or baserunner to advance one or more bases or allows an at bat to continue after the batter should have been put out.

Herman Long is the all-time leader in errors, committing 1,096 in his career. Bill Dahlen (1,080), Deacon White (1,018), and Germany Smith (1,009) are the only other players to commit over 1,000 career errors. Tommy Corcoran (992), Fred Pfeffer (980), Cap Anson (976), and John Montgomery Ward (952) are the only other players to commit over 900 career errors.

== Key ==
Rank	Rank amongst leaders in career errors committed. A blank field indicates a tie.
Player	Name of player.
E	Total career errors committed.
*	denotes elected to National Baseball Hall of Fame.

== List ==
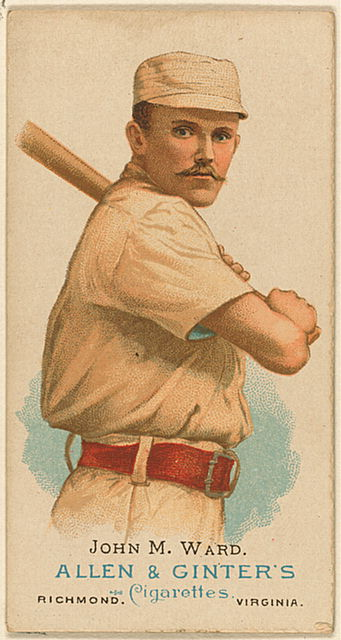
John Montgomery Ward, 8th all-time in career fielding errors.

- Stats updated as of April 3, 2026.

Rank	Player (2025 Es)	E
1	Herman Long	1,096
2	Bill Dahlen	1,080
3	Deacon White*	1,018
4	Germany Smith	1,009
5	Tommy Corcoran	992
6	Fred Pfeffer	980
7	Cap Anson*	976
8	John Montgomery Ward*	952
9	Jack Glasscock	895
10	Ed McKean	892
11	King Kelly*	851
12	Arlie Latham	844
13	Honus Wagner*	828
14	Bobby Wallace*	814
15	Monte Cross	813
16	George Davis*	803
17	Bob Ferguson	798
18	Bid McPhee*	796
19	Sam Wise	795
20	Jack Burdock	793
21	Ezra Sutton	782
22	Cub Stricker	748
23	Tom Burns	739
24	Joe Gerhardt	725
25	Rabbit Maranville*	711
26	Pop Snyder	708
27	Billy Shindle	705
28	Donie Bush	704
29	Jim O'Rourke*	700
30	Pop Smith	699
31	Ned Williamson	684
32	Luke Appling*	672
33	Kid Gleason	672
34	Billy Nash	669
35	Dave Bancroft*	666
36	Tom Daly	657
37	Yank Robinson	655
38	Joe Tinker*	648
39	Cupid Childs	647
40	Arthur Irwin	647
41	Hick Carpenter	625
42	Deacon McGuire	621
43	Shorty Fuller	615
44	Davy Force	613
45	Doggie Miller	613
46	Jerry Denny	609
47	Bones Ely	606
48	Joe Quinn	604
49	Frank Fennelly	602
50	Roger Connor*	596

Rank	Player (2025 Es)	E
51	Lave Cross	590
52	Paul Hines	590
53	Mickey Doolan	589
54	Lou Bierbauer	585
55	Buck Ewing*	572
56	Jack Farrell	570
57	Jack Rowe	568
58	Duke Farrell	562
59	Roger Peckinpaugh	554
60	Hughie Jennings*	552
61	Hardy Richardson	552
62	Jack Doyle	546
63	Chick Fulmer	545
64	Bill McClellan	542
65	Kid Elberfeld	538
66	Art Fletcher	537
67	Bill Gleason	537
68	Bill Hallman	534
69	Ivy Olson	534
70	Dan Brouthers*	531
71	Paul Radford	522
72	John Morrill	520
73	Bill Kuehne	519
74	Candy Nelson	519
75	Nap Lajoie*	518
76	Denny Lyons	514
77	Dick Bartell	512
78	Joe Cronin*	510
79	Bill Joyce	510
80	Bobby Lowe	508
81	Rogers Hornsby*	500
82	Fred Dunlap	499
83	Tom Brown	497
84	George McBride	489
85	Freddy Parent	488
86	Jake Beckley*	482
87	Joe Mulvey	479
88	Jimmy Collins*	478
89	Silver Flint	471
90	Harry Stovey	470
91	Al Myers	463
92	Harry Steinfeldt	463
93	Doc Lavan	461
94	Mike McGeary	460
95	Ross Barnes	459
96	Tommy Leach	459
97	George Pinkney	458
98	George Van Haltren	458
99	John Peters	455
100	Eddie Collins*	452

== By position ==
=== Pitchers ===
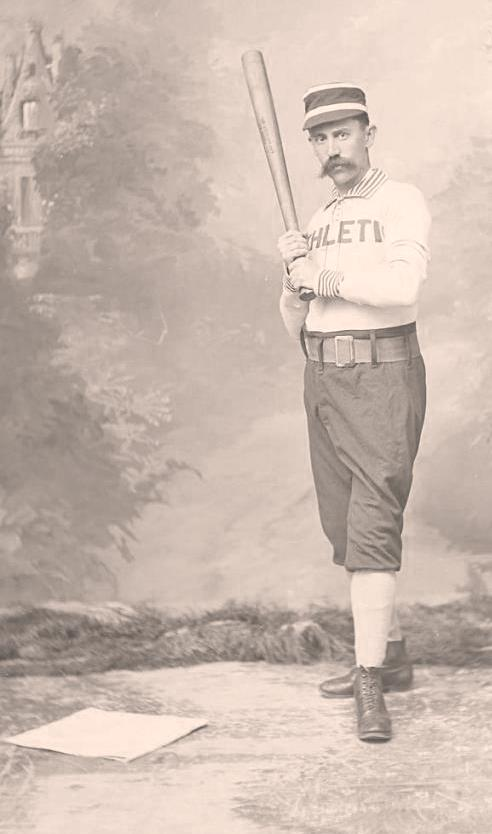
Bobby Mathews, the all-time leader in fielding errors as a pitcher.

The pitcher is the player who pitches the baseball from the pitcher's mound toward the catcher to begin each play, with the goal of retiring a batter, who attempts to either make contact with the pitched ball or draw a walk. The pitcher is often considered the most important player on the defensive side of the game, playing the most difficult and specialized position, and as such is regarded as being at the right end of the defensive spectrum. Pitchers play far less than players at other positions, generally appearing in only two or three games per week; only one pitcher in major league history has appeared in 100 games in a single season. There are many different types of pitchers, generally divided between starting pitchers and relief pitchers, which include the middle reliever, lefty specialist, setup man, and closer. In the scoring system used to record defensive plays, the pitcher is assigned the number 1.

The list of career leaders is dominated by players from the 19th century when fielding equipment was very rudimentary; baseball gloves only began to gain acceptance in the 1880s steadily, and were not uniformly worn until the mid-1890s, resulting in a much lower frequency of defensive miscues. The top 25 players in career errors began playing in the 19th century, most of them playing their entire careers before 1900; only four were active after 1901, and none after 1911. Most of the top 92 played entirely in the 19th century, with only 19 making their major league debut after 1900; only six made their debut after 1940. The top 16 single-season totals were all recorded before 1890, the top 95 were recorded before 1904, and the top 297 were recorded before 1924. To a large extent, the leaders reflect longevity rather than lower skill. Jim Kaat and Greg Maddux, whose error totals of 56 and 53 rank fifth and seventh among pitchers since 1940, won sixteen and eighteen Gold Glove Awards respectively for defensive excellence.

Bobby Mathews is the all-time leader in career errors committed by a pitcher with 220, more than twice as many as any pitcher who began playing after 1900; he is the only pitcher to commit more than 200 career errors. Tim Keefe is second with 166 career errors as a pitcher. Seventeen players have committed more than 100 career errors as pitchers. Justin Verlander, who had 35 errors through the end of the 2025 season to place him tied for 221st all-time, is the leader among active players.

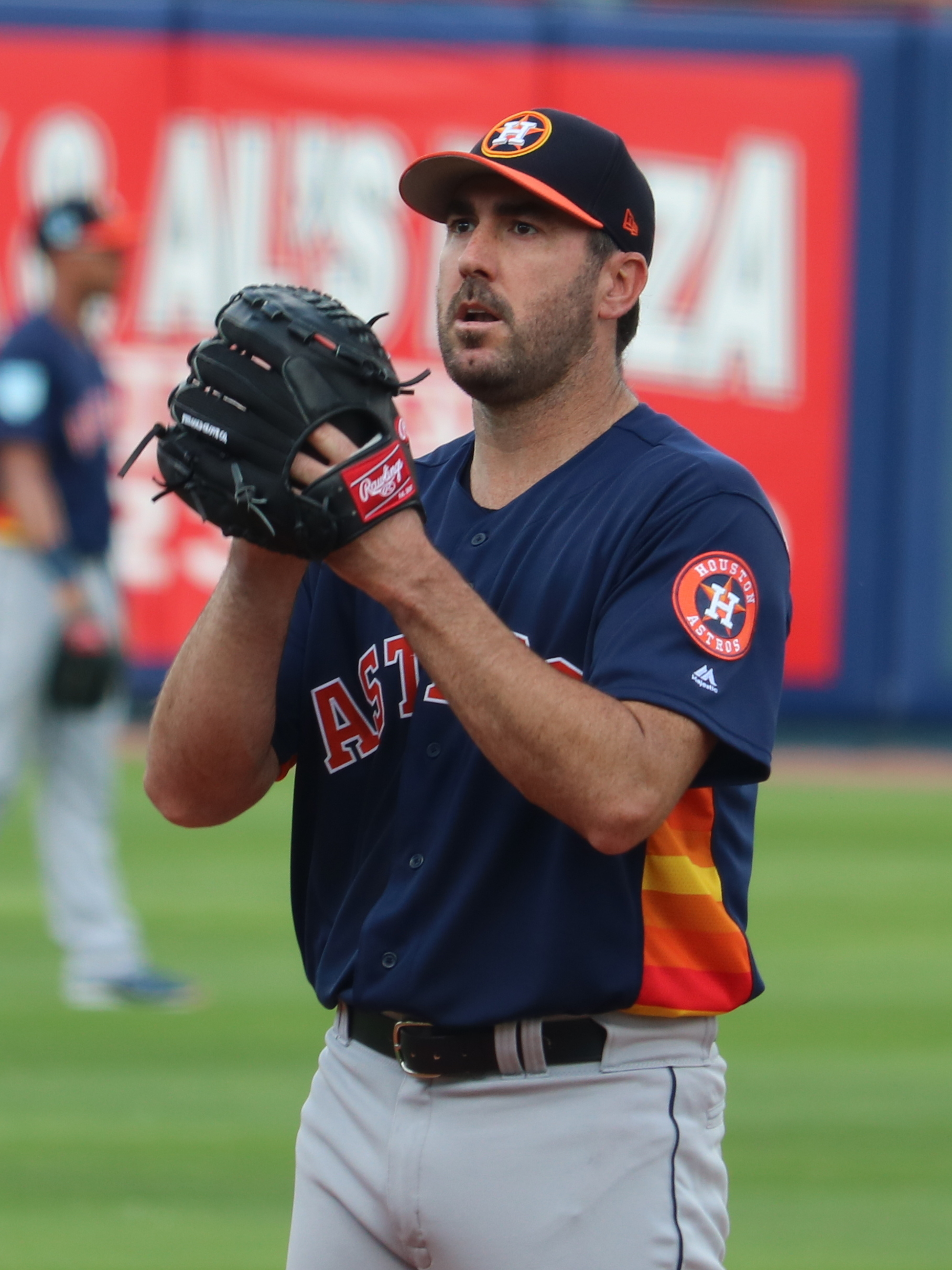
Justin Verlander, the active leader and is tied for 221st all-time in fielding errors as a pitcher.

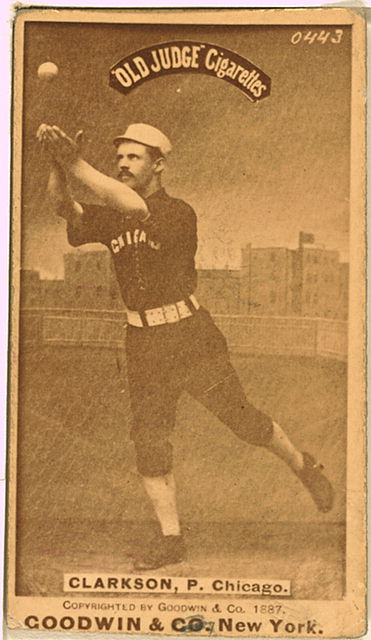
John Clarkson holds the National League record of 162 errors; he also set the league record for assists in a season with 174 in 1885.

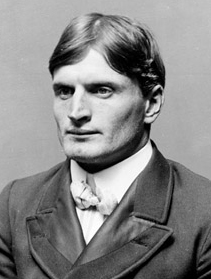
Rube Waddell holds the American League record of 79 errors.

- Stats updated as of April 3, 2026.

Rank	Player (2025 Es)	Throws	E as P
1	Bobby Mathews	R	220
2	Tim Keefe*	R	166
3	Pud Galvin*	R	163
4	John Clarkson*	R	162
5	Cy Young*	R	146
6	Mickey Welch*	R	133
7	Gus Weyhing	R	128
8	Tony Mullane	R	122
	Amos Rusie*	R	122
10	Bert Cunningham	R	111
	Charles Radbourn*	R	111
12	Albert Spalding*	R	110
13	Tommy Bond	R	109
14	Toad Ramsey	L	107
15	Will White	R	106
16	Adonis Terry	R	104
17	Joe McGinnity*	R	100
18	Jim McCormick	R	99
	Jim Whitney	R	99
20	George Bradley	R	98
21	Charlie Buffinton	R	94
	Red Ehret	R	94
	Chick Fraser	R	94
24	Matt Kilroy	L	91
	Rube Waddell*	L	91
26	Nolan Ryan*	R	90
27	George Zettlein	R	88
28	Win Mercer	R	84
29	Al Orth	R	83
30	Frank Killen	L	82
	George Mullin	R	82
32	Mark Baldwin	R	77
	Jack Taylor	R	77
34	Stump Weidman	R	76
35	Red Ames	R	74
	Bill Hutchison	R	74
	Hippo Vaughn	L	74
38	Ed Doheny	L	72
	Jack Powell	R	72
40	Jersey Bakley	R	71
	Ed Crane	R	71
	Red Faber*	R	71
	Burleigh Grimes*	R	71
	Jack Lynch	R	71
45	Eddie Cicotte	R	70
	Pink Hawley	R	70
	Sadie McMahon	R	70
	Ed Morris	L	70
49	Pretzels Getzien	R	68
	Dick McBride	R	68

Rank	Player (2025 Es)	Throws	E as P
51	Kid Carsey	R	67
	Larry Corcoran	R	67
	Kid Nichols*	R	67
	Vic Willis*	R	67
55	Kid Gleason	R	66
	Cy Seymour	L	66
57	Hardie Henderson	R	65
58	Bob Barr	R	64
	Clark Griffith*	R	64
60	Tom Hughes	R	63
61	Jumbo McGinnis		62
	Jack Stivetts	R	62
63	Bob Caruthers	R	61
	Egyptian Healy	R	61
	Bill Stearns	R	61
66	Fred Goldsmith	R	60
	Guy Hecker	R	60
	Jouett Meekin	R	60
	Earl Moore	R	60
70	Candy Cummings*	R	59
	Don Drysdale*	R	59
72	Cherokee Fisher	R	58
	Bill Lee	R	58
	Warren Spahn*	L	58
75	Ted Breitenstein	L	57
	Randy Johnson*	L	57
	Brickyard Kennedy	R	57
78	Jack Chesbro*	R	56
	Bill Dinneen	R	56
	Jim Kaat*	L	56
	Silver King	R	56
	Allan Sothoron	R	56
	Willie Sudhoff	R	56
	Ed Walsh*	R	56
85	Chief Bender*	R	55
86	Joaquín Andújar	R	54
	Ice Box Chamberlain	R	54
	Frank Dwyer	R	54
	Noodles Hahn	L	54
	Casey Patten	L	54
	Ed Reulbach	R	54
	John Montgomery Ward*	R	54
93	Frank Foreman	R	53
	Greg Maddux*	R	53
	Christy Mathewson*	R	53
	Doc Newton	L	53
	Wiley Piatt	L	53
98	Cy Falkenberg	R	52
	Bob Groom	R	52
	Walter Johnson*	R	52
	Sad Sam Jones	R	52

=== Catchers ===
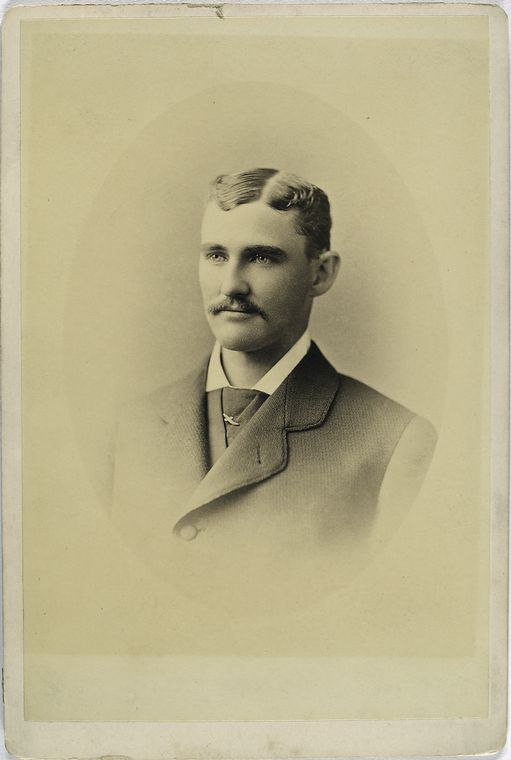
Pop Snyder, the all-time leader in fielding errors by a catcher.

The catcher is a position for a baseball or softball player. When a batter takes his/her turn to hit, the catcher crouches behind home plate, in front of the (home) umpire, and receives the ball from the pitcher. In addition to these primary duties, the catcher is also called upon to master many other skills in order to field the position well. The role of the catcher is similar to that of the wicket-keeper in cricket. In the numbering system used to record defensive plays, the catcher is assigned the number 2.

The list of career leaders is dominated by players from the 19th century, when fielding equipment was very rudimentary; baseball gloves only began to gain acceptance in the 1880s steadily, and were not uniformly worn until the mid-1890s, resulting in a much lower frequency of defensive miscues. Other protective equipment for catchers were also gradually introduced; the first masks were developed in the late 1870s, with improvements in the 1890s, but shin guards were not introduced to the major leagues until 1907. The top 15 players in career errors all played primarily in the 19th century, and half of the top 52 played their entire careers prior to 1894; only five were active after 1920, and none were active after 1931. To a large extent, the leaders reflect longevity rather than lower skill; of the six catchers in the top 100 who were active after 1960, most were winners of Gold Glove Awards; Bob Boone, who leads all post-1931 catchers with 178 errors, won seven Gold Glove Awards for defensive excellence.

Pop Snyder, who retired in 1891 with a record 877 games as a catcher, is the all-time leader in career fielding errors by a catcher with 685, nearly four times as many as any catcher who began their career after 1915. Deacon McGuire, who ended his career in 1912 with a record 1,612 games caught, is second with 577 and is the only other catcher to commit more than 500 errors. Yan Gomes, who had 68 errors through the 2025 season to place him tied for 266th all-time, is the leader among active players.

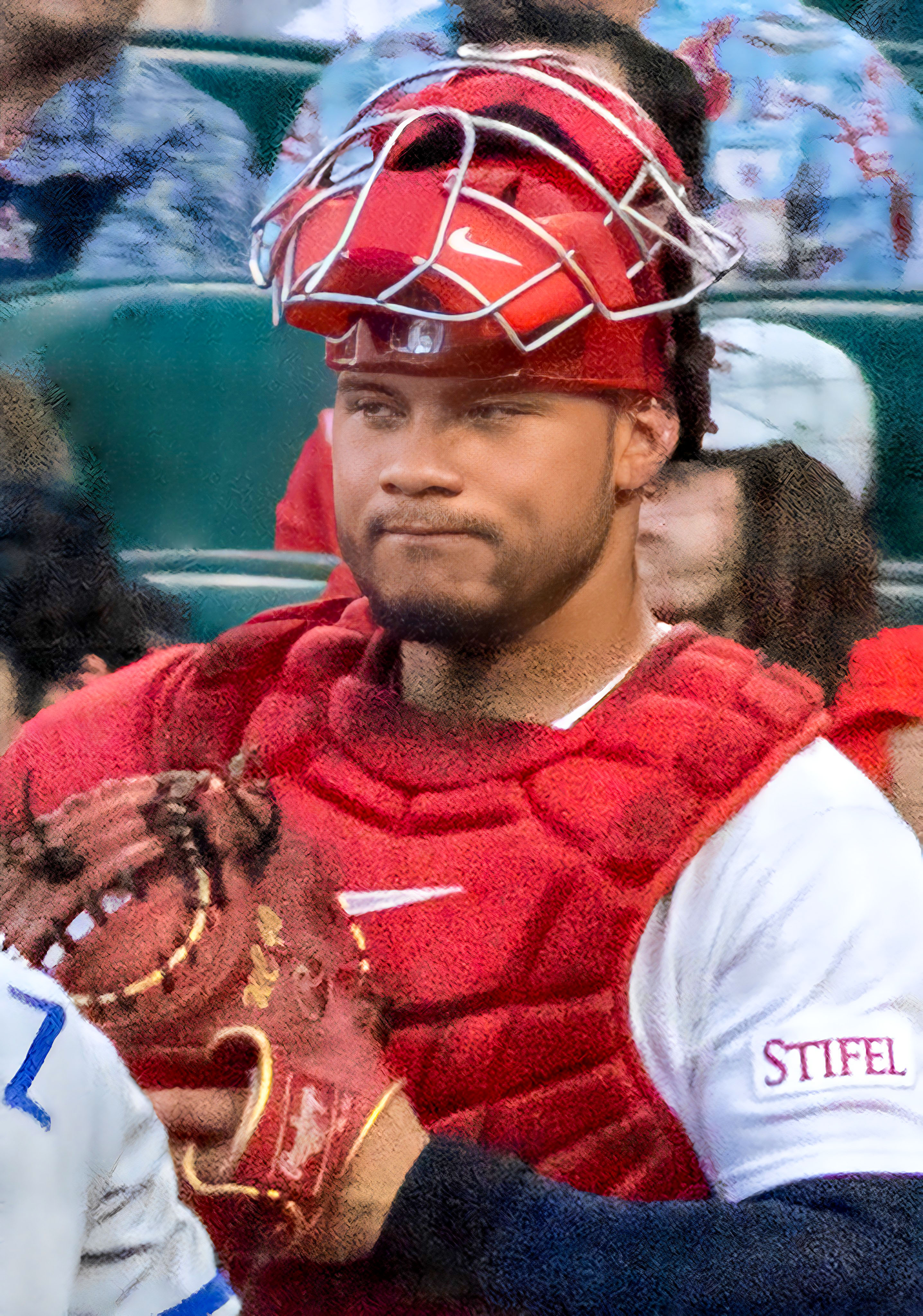
Willson Contreras, the active leader and is tied for 275th all-time in fielding errors as a catcher.

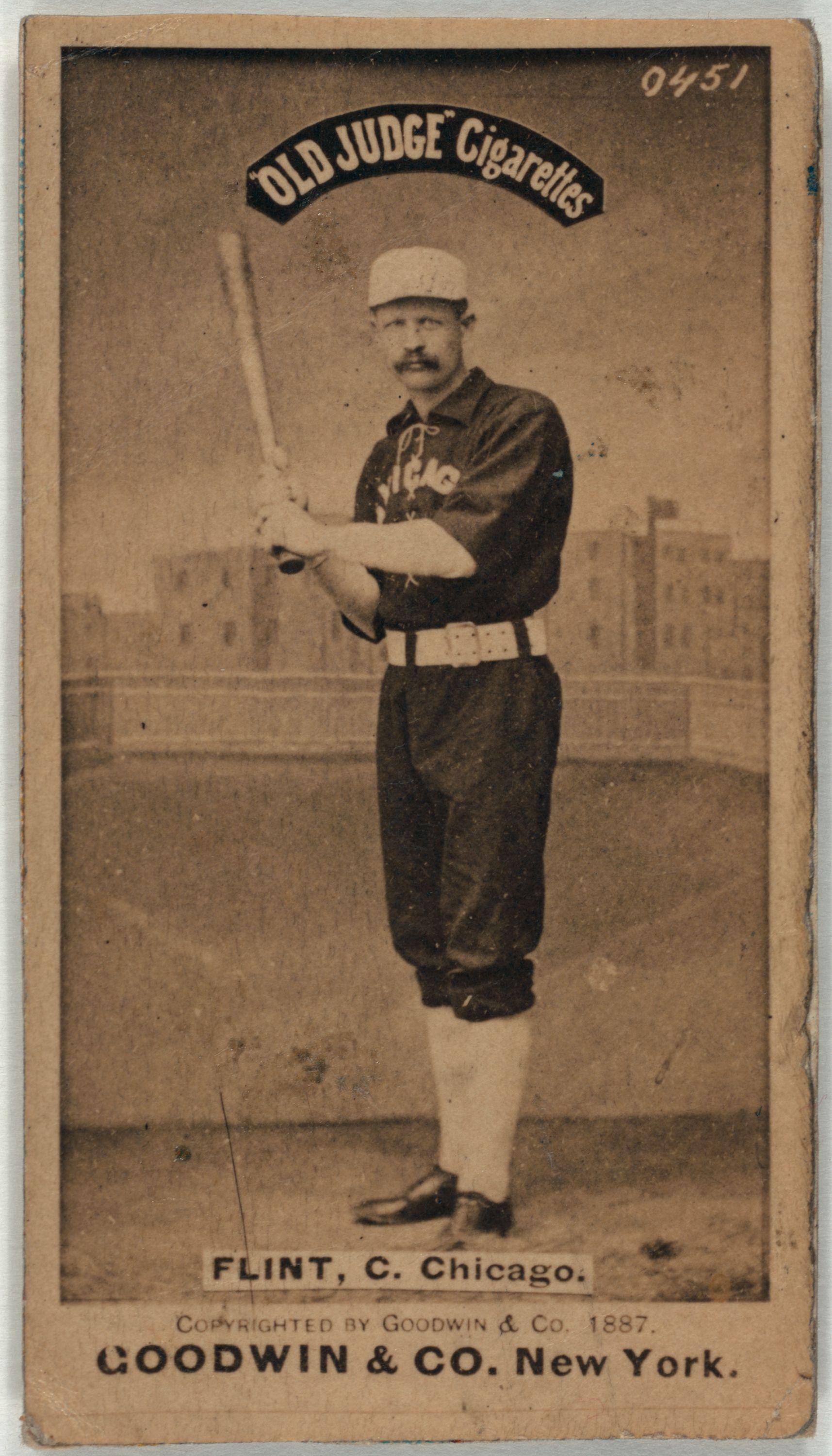
Silver Flint holds the National League record of 436 errors as a catcher, but also held the league record for career assists for 15 years.

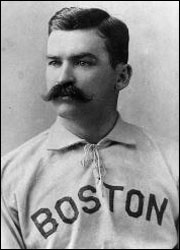
King Kelly, 10th all-time in fielding errors by a catcher despite playing over 60% of his career at other positions.

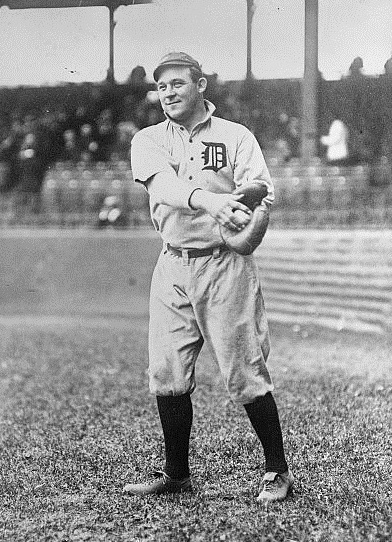
Oscar Stanage holds the American League record of 229 errors as a catcher; he also holds the league record for assists in a season.

- Stats updated as of April 3, 2026.

Rank	Player (2025 Es)	E as C
1	Pop Snyder	685
2	Deacon McGuire	577
3	Silver Flint	456
4	Doc Bushong	412
	Wilbert Robinson*	412
6	Deacon White*	399
7	Jack Clements	394
8	Bill Holbert	393
9	Charlie Bennett	379
10	King Kelly*	368
11	Duke Farrell	366
12	John Clapp	364
13	Nat Hicks	352
14	Chief Zimmer	328
15	Buck Ewing*	322
16	Red Dooin	320
17	Jocko Milligan	304
18	Kid Baldwin	302
19	Barney Gilligan	299
20	Doggie Miller	285
21	Con Daily	283
22	Connie Mack*	281
23	Malachi Kittridge	264
24	Lew Brown	245
25	Emil Gross	242
26	Jack Boyle	237
27	Pop Schriver	235
28	Ivey Wingo	234
29	Fred Carroll	231
30	Charlie Ganzel	229
	Oscar Stanage	229
32	Doug Allison	225
33	Bob Clark	223
	Wally Schang	223
35	Steve O'Neill	217
36	Sam Trott	211
	Farmer Vaughn	211
38	Johnny Kling	210
39	Jack Warner	205
40	Fatty Briody	204
41	Dick Buckley	198
42	Jimmy Peoples	197
43	George Myers	195
	Charlie Reipschlager	195
45	Eddie Ainsmith	195
46	Boileryard Clarke	190
47	Jim Keenan	187
	Heinie Peitz	187
49	Pat Deasley	186
50	Frank Bowerman	185

Rank	Player (2025 Es)	E as C
51	Jack O'Brien	183
52	Scott Hastings	182
53	Bob Boone	178
54	Jack O'Connor	177
55	Morgan Murphy	175
	Ray Schalk*	175
57	Lou Criger	170
58	Rudy Kemmler	169
59	Fergy Malone	168
60	Roger Bresnahan*	167
61	Paul Cook	166
	Ossee Schreckengost	166
	Joe Sugden	166
64	Tom Kinslow	163
65	Bill Bergen	161
66	John Grim	158
67	Dick Higham	157
68	Carlton Fisk*	155
69	Rollie Hemsley	154
	Jack Ryan	154
71	George Gibson	153
72	Benito Santiago	151
	Ed Whiting	151
74	Bill Rariden	150
	Luke Sewell	150
76	Tom Daly	148
	Bill Killefer	148
	Gus Mancuso	148
	Jack Rowe	148
	Billy Sullivan	148
81	Jim Donahue	146
	Chief Meyers	146
83	Bill Harbridge	145
84	Jason Kendall	144
	Ed McFarland	144
86	Mert Hackett	143
	Ernie Lombardi*	143
88	Iván Rodríguez*	142
89	Gabby Hartnett*	139
90	Walker Cooper	138
	Lave Cross	138
	Ed Sweeney	138
93	Jimmie Wilson	136
94	Rick Ferrell*	135
	Otto Miller	135
96	Darrell Porter	134
97	John Kelly	133
	Andy Seminick	133
99	Sam Agnew	132
	Mike Grady	132

=== First Basemen ===
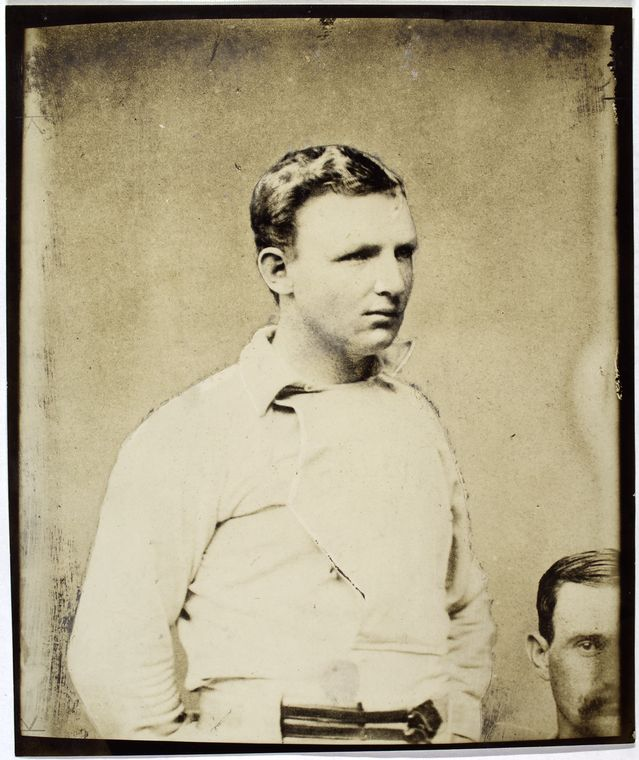
Cap Anson, the all-time leader in fielding errors as a first baseman.

First base, or 1B, is the first of four stations on a baseball diamond which must be touched in succession by a baserunner to score a run for that player's team. A first baseman is the player on the team playing defense who fields the area nearest first base, and is responsible for the majority of plays made at that base. In the numbering system used to record defensive plays, the first baseman is assigned the number 3.

The list of career leaders is dominated by players from the 19th century when fielding equipment was very rudimentary; baseball gloves only began to gain acceptance in the 1880s steadily, and were not uniformly worn until the mid-1890s, resulting in a much lower frequency of defensive miscues. Additional modifications were made to first basemen's gloves in the 1930s which further reduced errors. All but one of the top 14 players in career errors began playing in the 19th century, and most played their entire careers before 1900; none were active after 1919. None of the top 20 were active after 1930, and only 10 of the top 64 were active after 1950. The top 48 single-season totals were all recorded before 1900, and the top 179 were recorded before 1920. To a large extent, the leaders reflect longevity rather than lower skill. George Sisler, whose 269 errors are the most by any first baseman whose career began after 1910, is often regarded as the greatest defensive first baseman in history; George Scott, whose 165 errors are the most by an American League first baseman since the Gold Glove Awards for fielding excellence were introduced in 1957, won the award eight times – including 1967, when he led the AL with 19 errors.

Cap Anson, whose career began in 1871 and who played nearly 400 more games at first base than any other player in the 19th century, is the all-time leader in career errors as a first baseman with 658, nearly three times as many as any first baseman whose career began after 1920; he also holds the National League record of 583. Dan Brouthers, who played only one game at first base after 1896, is second all-time with 513 and is the only other first baseman to commit more than 500 errors. Freddie Freeman, who had 76 errors through the end of the 2025 season to place him tied for 176th all-time, is the leader among active players.

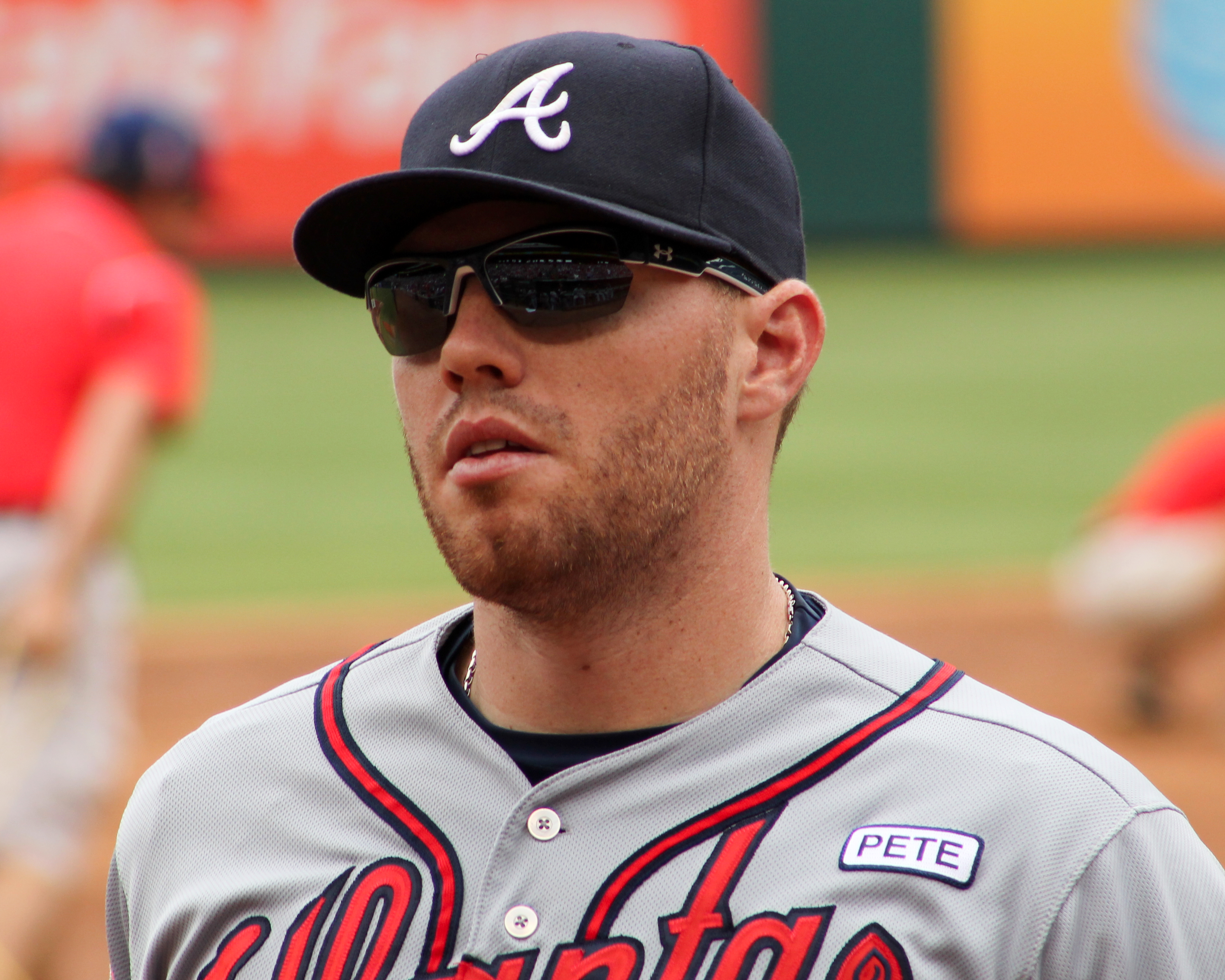
Freddie Freeman, the active leader and is tied for 176th all-time in fielding errors as a first baseman.

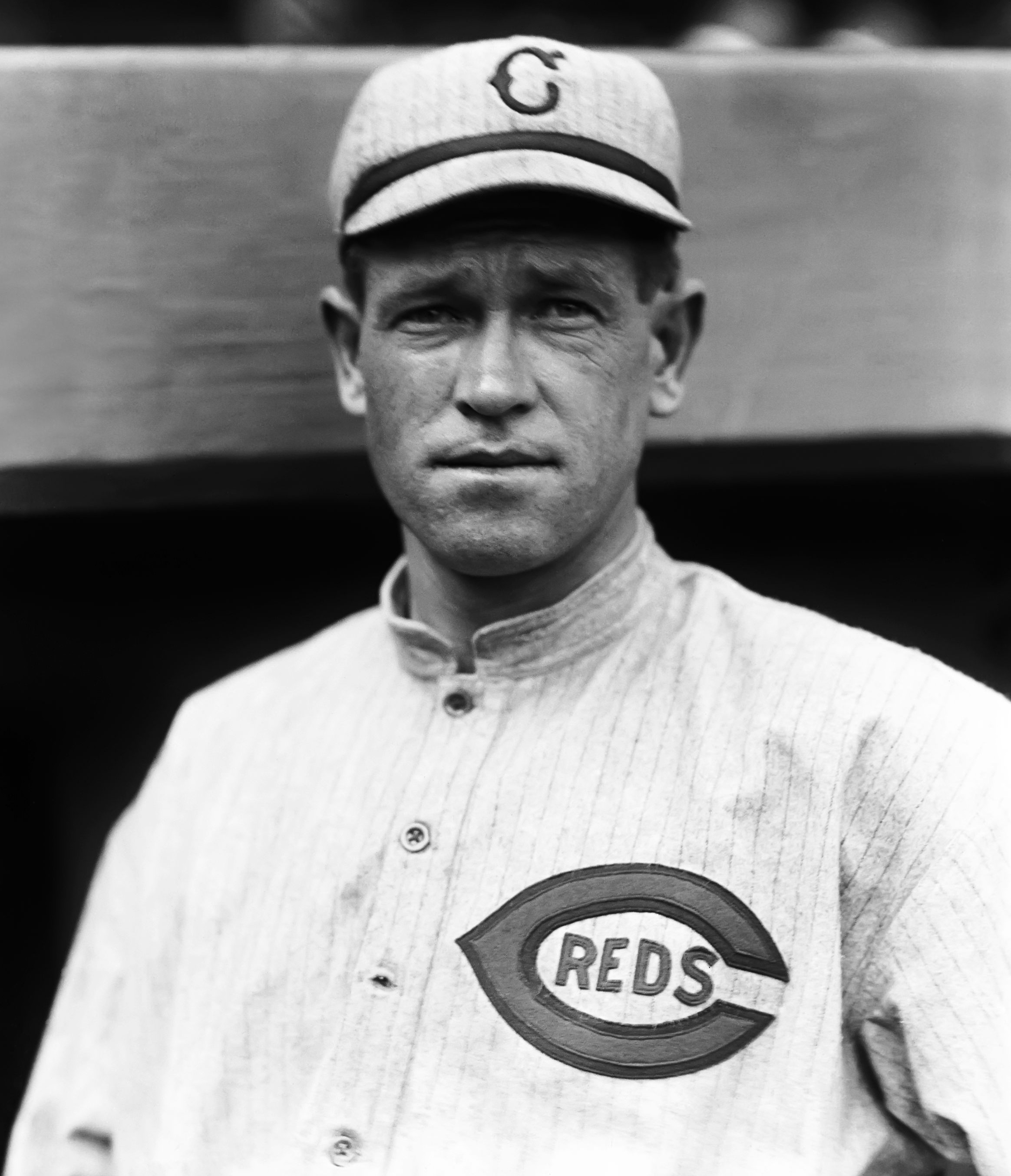
Hal Chase holds the American League record of 285 errors, but was highly regarded for his defense.

- Stats updated as of April 3, 2026.

Rank	Player (2025 Es)	E as 1B
1	Cap Anson*	658
2	Dan Brouthers*	513
3	Jake Beckley*	481
4	Joe Start	433
5	Roger Connor*	419
6	Charlie Comiskey*	403
7	Hal Chase	402
8	Tommy Tucker	393
9	Harry Davis	343
10	Fred Tenney	327
11	Bill Phillips	324
12	John Reilly	316
13	John Morrill	285
14	Jack Doyle	277
15	George Sisler*	269
16	Sid Farrar	262
17	Fred Merkle	252
18	George Burns	245
19	Harry Stovey	241
20	Kitty Bransfield	236
21	Willie McCovey*	233
22	Herman Dehlman	230
23	Dave Orr	227
24	Ed Konetchy	224
25	Jim Bottomley*	223
26	Mickey Vernon	211
27	Henry Larkin	209
28	Jack Fournier	208
29	Candy LaChance	207
	Everett Mills	207
31	Dan Stearns	206
32	Fred Luderus	201
33	Tim Murnane	195
34	George Stovall	194
35	Lou Gehrig*	193
36	Lu Blue	191
37	Tom Jones	183
38	Jake Daubert	181
39	Dick Hoblitzell	180
40	Andrés Galarraga	176
41	Joe Kuhel	173
42	Charlie Gould	169
	Dan McGann	169
	Dick Stuart	169
45	Wally Pipp	168
46	Fred McGriff*	167
	Eddie Murray*	167
48	George Scott	165
49	Orlando Cepeda*	162
	Charlie Grimm	162

Rank	Player (2025 Es)	E as 1B
51	Jim Field	161
52	Stuffy McInnis	160
53	Martin Powell	159
	Perry Werden	159
55	Jimmie Foxx*	155
56	Jake Stahl	150
57	Dave Foutz	150
58	Donn Clendenon	146
	Juice Latham	146
60	Earl Torgeson	143
61	Charlie Hickman	142
	Joe Judge	142
63	Dolph Camilli	141
	Guy Hecker	141
65	Mo Vaughn	139
66	Ferris Fain	138
	Bill Terry*	138
68	Will Clark	136
	Alex McKinnon	136
	Jim O'Rourke*	136
71	Frank Chance*	135
72	Johnny Mize*	133
73	John Kerins	132
74	Norm Cash	131
75	Chris Chambliss	130
76	Jeff Bagwell*	129
	Carlos Delgado	129
	Vic Saier	129
79	Bill Buckner	128
	Denny Mack	128
81	Gil Hodges*	126
82	Phil Cavarretta	123
83	Rudy York	122
84	Cecil Cooper	121
	George Kelly*	121
	Hal Trosky	121
87	Mox McQuery	120
88	Ryan Howard	119
89	John Anderson	117
	Tony Pérez*	117
91	Boog Powell	116
	Albert Pujols	116
	Gus Suhr	116
94	Ed Cartwright	115
	Mike Hargrove	115
	Keith Hernandez	115
97	John Glenn	113
	Doc Johnston	113
	George McQuinn	113
	Earl Sheely	113

=== Second Basemen ===
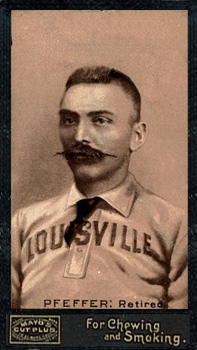
Fred Pfeffer, the all-time leader in fielding errors as a second baseman.

In baseball and softball, the second baseman is a fielding position in the infield, commonly stationed between second and first base. The second baseman often possesses quick hands and feet, needs the ability to get rid of the ball quickly, and must be able to make the pivot on a double play. In addition, second basemen are almost always right-handed. Only four left-handed throwing players have appeared as second basemen in the major leagues since 1950; one of the four, Gonzalo Márquez, was listed as the second baseman in the starting lineup for two games in 1973, batting in the first inning, but was replaced before his team took the field on defense, and none of the other three players lasted even a complete inning at the position. In the numbering system used to record defensive plays, the second baseman is assigned the number 4.

The list of career leaders is dominated by players from the 19th century, when fielding equipment was very rudimentary; baseball gloves only began to gain acceptance in the 1880s steadily, and were not uniformly worn until the mid-1890s, resulting in a much lower frequency of defensive miscues. All but three of the top 21 players in career errors began playing in the 19th century – including the top 13, ten of whom played their entire careers before 1900; only one of the top 21 played more than two games after 1920. None of the top 25 were active after 1930, with the top eight players active after 1926 all being members of the Baseball Hall of Fame; none of the top 49, and only eight of the top 77, were active after 1953. The top 59 single-season totals were all recorded before 1895, the top 192 were recorded before 1928, and the top 410 were recorded before 1946. To a large extent, the leaders reflect longevity rather than lower skill. Joe Morgan, whose 244 errors are the most by any second baseman since 1945, won five Gold Glove Awards for defensive excellence.

Fred Pfeffer, who retired in 1897 after having set National League (NL) records for career games, putouts and assists as a second baseman, is the all-time leader in career errors as a second baseman with 857 – nearly twice as many as any player whose career began after 1900, and over three times as many as any player who reached the major leagues after 1930; he is the only second baseman with over 800, and also holds the NL record of 781. Bid McPhee (792) and Cub Stricker (701), whose careers ended in 1899 and 1893 respectively, are the only other second basemen to commit more than 700 career errors. Jose Altuve, who had 109 errors through the end of the 2025 season to place him tied for 181st all-time, is the leader among active players.

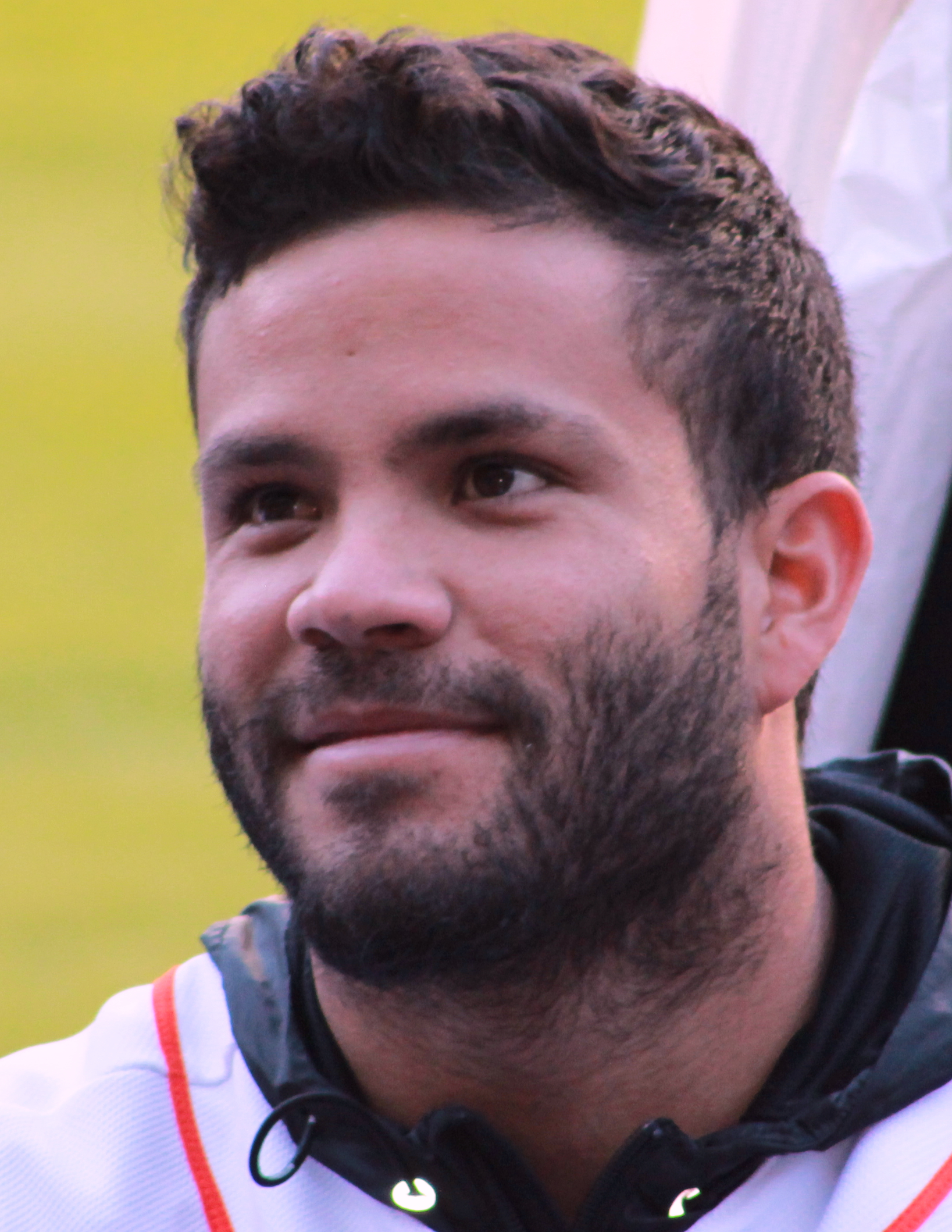
Jose Altuve, the active leader and is tied for 176th all-time in errors as a second baseman.

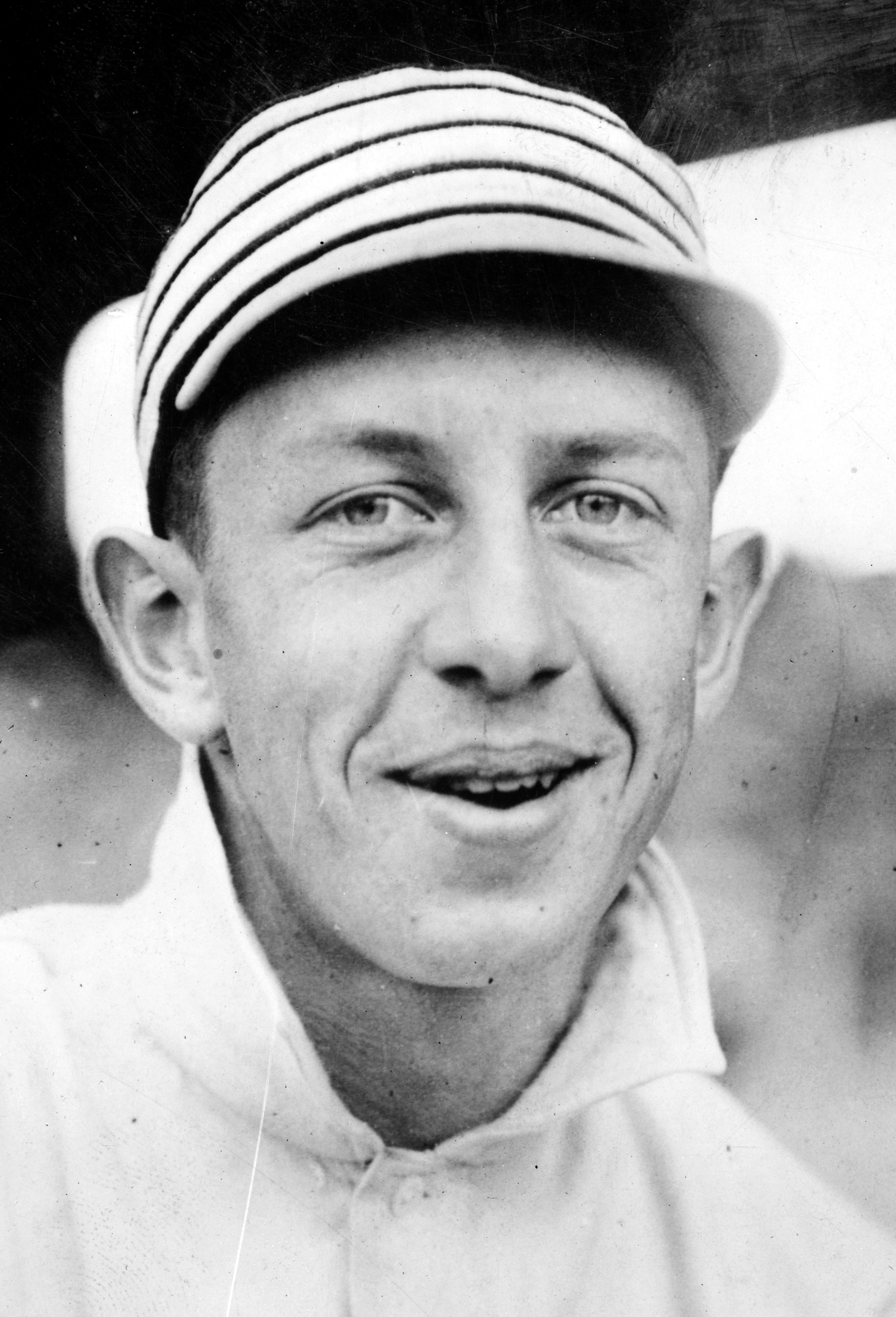
Eddie Collins holds the American League record of 435 errors, as well as the league records for games, putouts, and assists at second base.

- Stats updated as of April 24, 2026.

Rank	Player (2025 Es)	E as 2B
1	Fred Pfeffer	857
2	Bid McPhee*	792
3	Cub Stricker	701
4	Jack Burdock	664
5	Cupid Childs	646
6	Lou Bierbauer	574
7	Kid Gleason	571
8	Joe Gerhardt	558
9	Fred Dunlap	498
10	Jack Farrell	477
11	Yank Robinson	475
12	Pop Smith	469
13	Nap Lajoie*	451
14	Larry Doyle	443
15	Eddie Collins*	435
16	Al Myers	430
17	Johnny Evers*	423
18	Tom Daly	418
19	Joe Quinn	410
20	Bobby Lowe	389
21	Bill Hallman	385
22	Del Pratt	381
23	Miller Huggins*	376
24	Joe Quest	370
25	Claude Ritchey	355
26	Billy Herman*	354
27	Hardy Richardson	349
28	Reddy Mack	330
29	George Creamer	324
30	Ross Barnes	310
31	Charlie Gehringer*	309
32	Rogers Hornsby*	307
33	Bill McClellan	302
34	George Cutshaw	299
35	Bill Wambsganss	292
	Jimmy Williams	292
37	Otto Knabe	287
38	Sam Wise	282
39	Frankie Frisch*	280
40	Bill Greenwood	273
41	Hobe Ferris	270
42	Bob Ferguson	267
43	Sam Crane	264
44	Bucky Harris*	263
	Tony Lazzeri*	263
	John Montgomery Ward*	263
47	Joe Gordon*	260
48	George Grantham	250
49	Danny Richardson	245
50	Joe Morgan*	244

Rank	Player (2025 Es)	E as 2B
51	Billy Gilbert	237
52	Sam Barkley	235
53	Willie Randolph	234
54	Charley Bassett	232
55	Hughie Critz	231
56	Ralph Young	228
57	Dick Padden	224
58	Julián Javier	219
59	Ski Melillo	215
60	Bobby Doerr*	214
61	Nellie Fox*	209
62	Jack Crooks	204
	Bill Mazeroski*	204
64	Buddy Myer	200
65	Danny Murphy	199
66	Dasher Troy	195
67	Jeff Kent*	194
	Marty McManus	194
69	Tony Cuccinello	190
	Jerry Priddy	190
71	John Farrell	189
	Lou Whitaker	189
73	John O'Brien	188
74	Steve Sax	187
75	Bill Craver	186
	Tommy Dowd	186
77	Jimmy Dykes	183
78	Tito Fuentes	182
79	Roberto Alomar*	181
	Ray Durham	181
81	Frank LaPorte	180
	Heinie Reitz	180
83	Glenn Beckert	179
	Frank White	179
85	Charlie Sweasy	178
	Tony Taylor	178
87	Johnny Temple	172
88	Red Schoendienst*	170
89	Bill Sweeney	169
90	Ian Kinsler	168
	Dots Miller	168
92	Hub Collins	164
	Mike McGeary	164
	Connie Ryan	164
	Juan Samuel	164
96	Max Bishop	163
97	Davey Lopes	162
	Eddie Stanky	162
99	Dick Egan	160
100	Manny Trillo	157

=== Third basemen ===
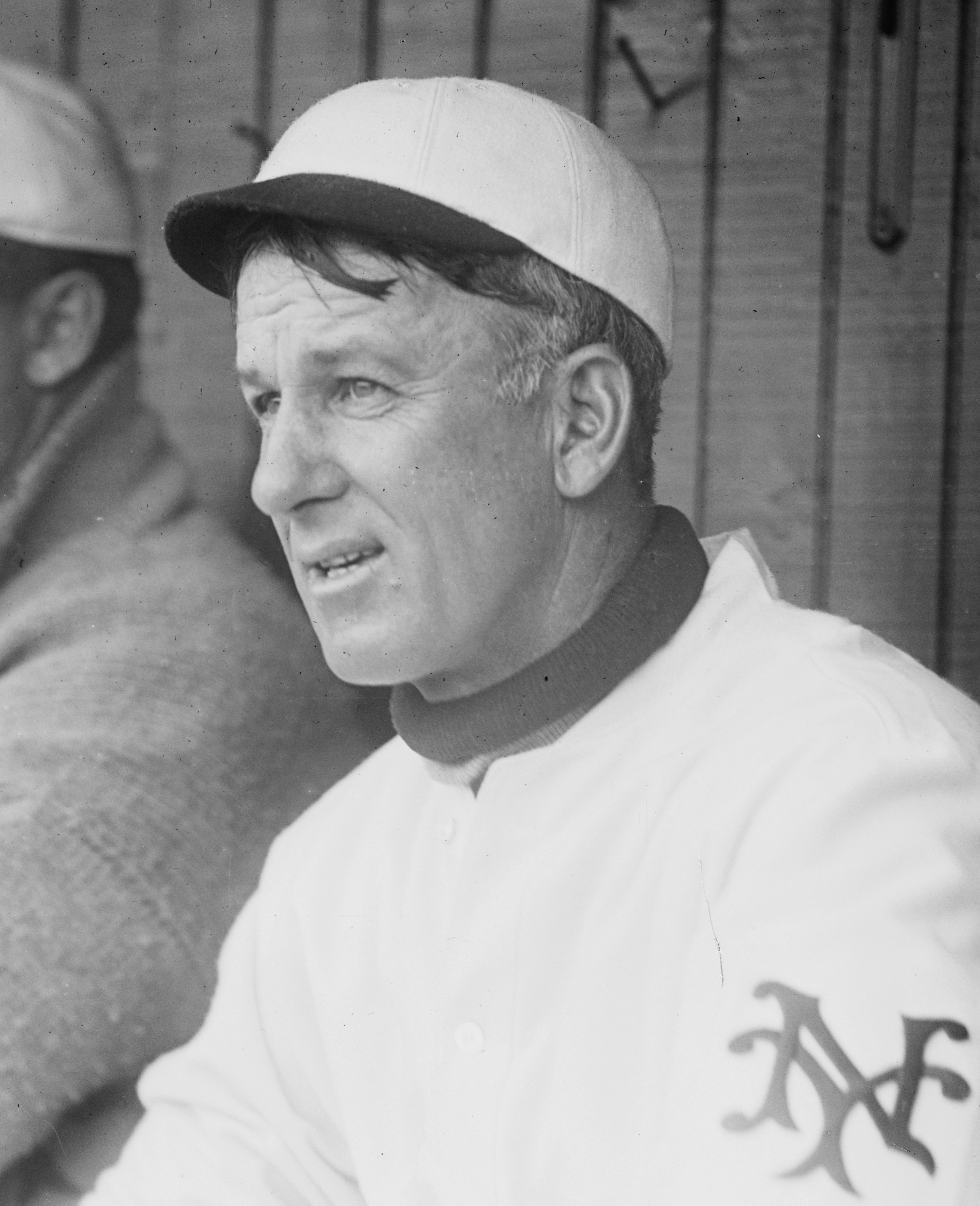
Arlie Latham, the all-time leader in fielding errors as a third baseman

Third base is the third of four stations on a baseball diamond which must be touched in succession by a baserunner in order to score a run for that player's team. A third baseman, abbreviated 3B, is the player on the team playing defense who fields the area nearest third base, and is responsible for the majority of plays made at that base. The third baseman requires good reflexes in reacting to batted balls, often being the closest infielder (roughly 90–120 feet) to the batter. The third base position requires a strong and accurate arm, as the third baseman often makes long throws to first base. The third baseman sometimes must throw quickly to second base in time to start a double play, and must also field fly balls in both fair and foul territory. In the scoring system used to record defensive plays, the third baseman is assigned the number 5.

The list of career leaders is dominated by players from the 19th century, when fielding equipment was very rudimentary; baseball gloves only began to gain acceptance in the 1880s steadily, and were not uniformly worn until the mid-1890s, resulting in a much lower frequency of defensive miscues. The top 19 players in career errors all began playing in the 19th century, all but four of them playing their entire careers before 1900; none were active in the major leagues after 1911. Only two of the top 29 were active after 1929, and none were active after 1946. Through 2021, the top 129 single-season totals were all recorded before 1906, and only five of the top 316 were recorded after 1942. To a large extent, the leaders reflect longevity rather than lower skill. Ron Santo, who leads all post-1950 third basemen with 317 errors, won five Gold Glove Awards for fielding excellence.

Arlie Latham, who set a major league record with 1,573 career games at third base – none of them after 1896 – is the all-time leader in career errors committed as a third baseman with 822, more than twice as many as any player who reached the major leagues after 1900; he is the only third baseman to commit more than 700 career errors. Billy Nash, whose career ended in 1898 after setting the National League record for games at third base, is second all-time; he is the only other third baseman to commit more than 600 errors. Rafael Devers, who had 141 errors through the 2025 season to place him tied for 143rd all-time, is the leader among active players.

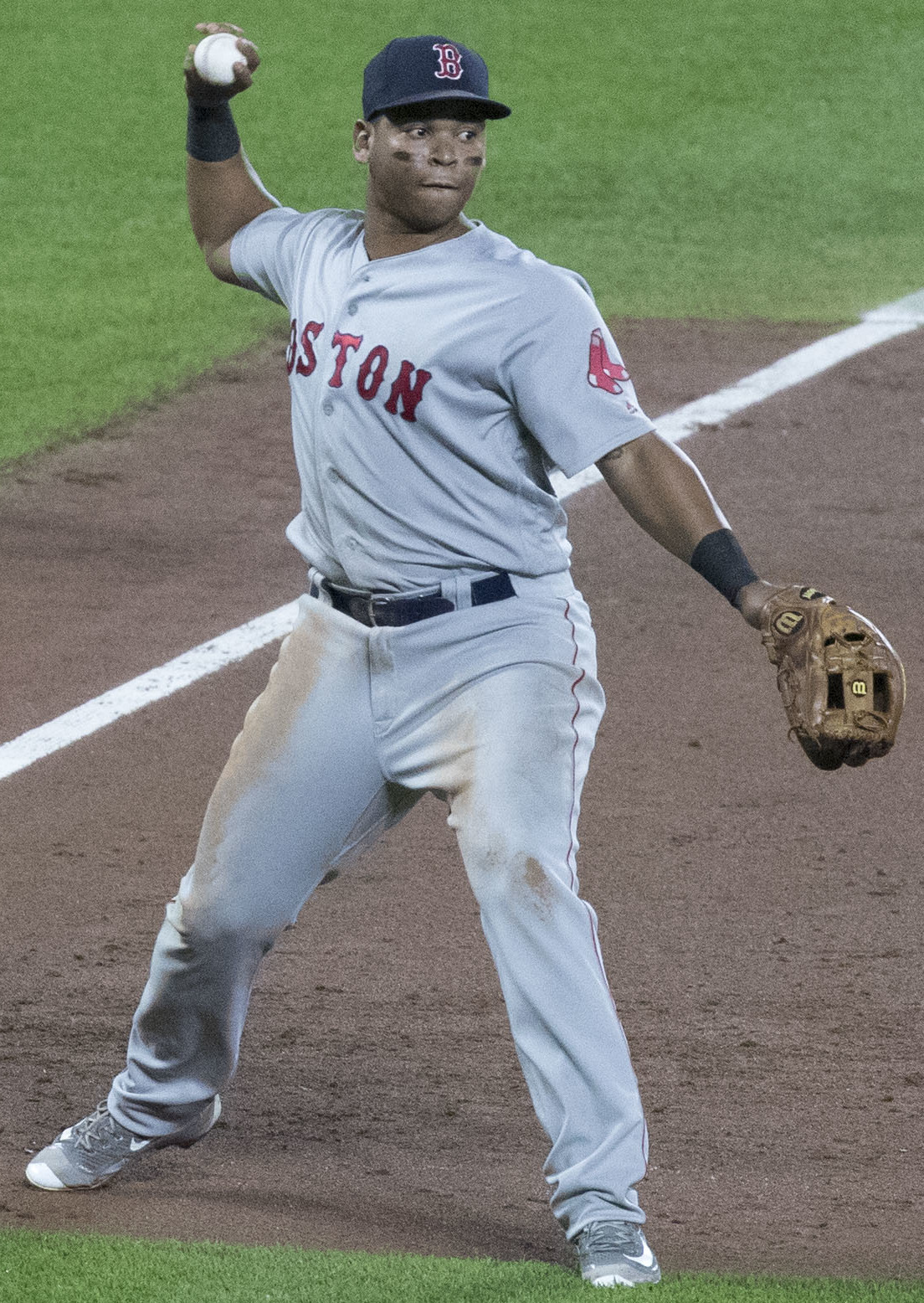
Rafael Devers, the active leader and is tied for 143rd all-time in fielding errors as a third baseman.

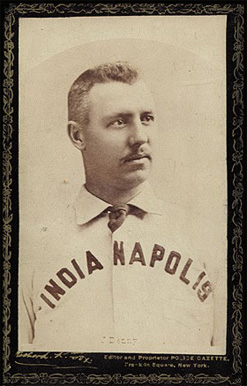
Jerry Denny, who also set National League records for games, putouts and assists at third base, holds the NL record of 552 errors.

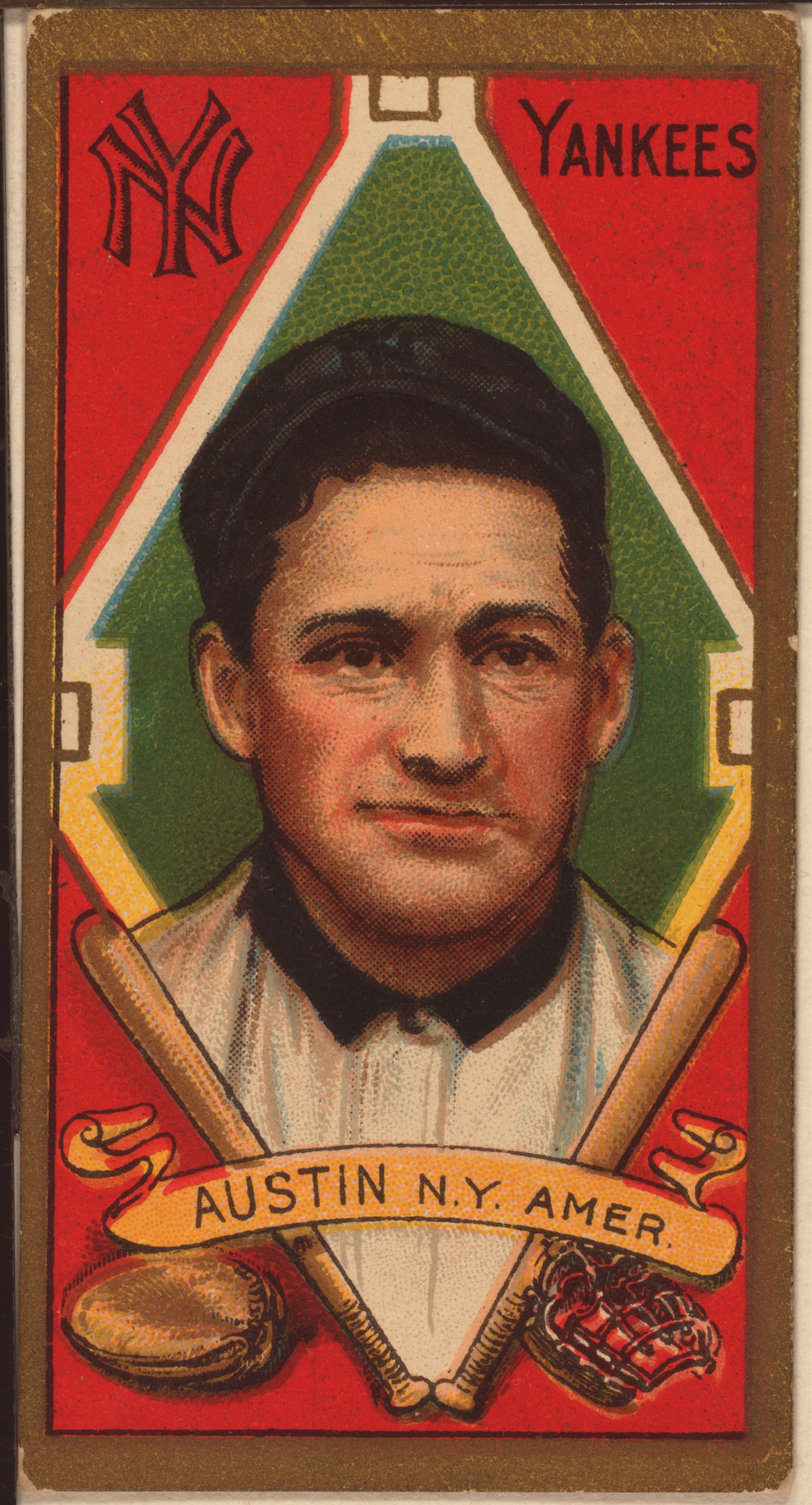
Jimmy Austin holds the American League record of 358 errors.

- Stats updated as of April 3, 2026.

Rank	Player (2025 Es)	E as 3B
1	Arlie Latham	822
2	Billy Nash	615
3	Hick Carpenter	591
4	Billy Shindle	570
5	Jerry Denny	552
6	Ezra Sutton	516
7	Denny Lyons	509
8	Joe Mulvey	475
9	Bob Ferguson	466
10	Jimmy Collins*	465
11	Deacon White*	444
12	Bill Joyce	439
13	Ned Williamson	401
14	Lave Cross	397
15	George Pinkney	387
16	Harry Schafer	380
17	Frank Hankinson	373
	Bill Kuehne	373
19	Harry Steinfeldt	365
20	Jimmy Austin	358
21	Pinky Higgins	356
22	Tommy Leach	344
	Art Whitney	244
24	Bill Bradley	336
25	Tom Burns	327
26	Doc Casey	325
27	Pie Traynor*	324
28	Home Run Baker*	322
29	Jim Donnelly	318
30	Jumbo Davis	317
	Ron Santo*	317
32	Mike Schmidt*	313
33	Adrián Beltré*	311
34	Graig Nettles	295
35	Eddie Mathews*	293
36	Larry Gardner	287
37	John McGraw*	280
38	Harlond Clift	279
39	Eddie Foster	278
40	Jack Gleason	273
41	Eddie Yost	270
42	Ken Boyer	264
43	Charlie Reilly	263
	Brooks Robinson*	263
	Harry Wolverton	263
46	George Brett*	261
47	Bobby Byrne	258
48	Art Devlin	257
49	Buddy Bell	254
50	Darrell Evans	253

Rank	Player (2025 Es)	E as 3B
51	Fred Hartman	251
	Charlie Irwin	251
53	Ken Caminiti	249
54	Stan Hack	246
55	Aramis Ramírez	244
	Red Smith	244
57	Tim Wallach	240
58	Terry Pendleton	238
59	Bob Elliott	236
60	Bill Coughlin	231
	Heinie Zimmerman	231
62	Wade Boggs*	229
63	Sal Bando	228
	Mike Muldoon	228
	Milt Stock	228
	Patsy Tebeau	228
	Todd Zeile	228
68	Gary Gaetti	224
69	Ron Cey	223
	Chipper Jones*	223
	Joe Werrick	223
72	Mike Mowrey	221
73	Jim Tabor	220
	Robin Ventura	220
	Billy Werber	220
76	Harry Lord	217
77	Aurelio Rodríguez	215
78	Warren White	214
79	George Davis*	211
80	Ossie Bluege	208
81	Joe Battin	207
82	Levi Meyerle	205
83	Bill Hague	200
84	George Moriarty	199
85	Doug DeCinces	198
86	Cap Anson*	196
	Frank Malzone	196
88	Bill Madlock	193
89	Willie Jones	192
90	Billy Lauder	190
	David Wright	190
92	Chippy McGarr	189
93	Jimmy Dykes	188
94	Doug Rader	187
95	Scott Rolen*	186
96	Willie Kamm	185
	Dean Palmer	185
98	Richie Hebner	182
99	Bobby Bonilla	181
100	Matt Williams	177

=== Shortstop ===
Herman Long, the all-time leader in fielding errors as a shortstop.

Shortstop, abbreviated SS, is a baseball or softball fielding position in the infield, commonly stationed between second and third base, which is considered to be among the most demanding defensive positions. Defensive specialists mostly fill the position, so shortstops are generally relatively poor batters who typically hit lower in the batting order. In the numbering system used to record defensive plays, the shortstop is assigned the number 6.

The list of career leaders is dominated by players from the 19th century when fielding equipment was very rudimentary; baseball gloves only began to gain acceptance in the 1880s steadily, and were not uniformly worn until the mid-1890s, resulting in a much lower frequency of defensive miscues. 13 of the top 18 players in career errors began playing in the 19th century, six of whom played their entire careers before 1900; only one of the top 24 made their major league debut after 1915, and none of the top 38 were active after 1950. The top 12 single-season totals were all recorded before 1894, the top 61 were recorded before 1909, and the top 187 were recorded before 1919; none of the top 500 have been recorded since 1951. To a large extent, the leaders reflect longevity rather than lower skill. Luis Aparicio, whose 366 errors are the most by any American League (AL) shortstop since 1940, won nine Gold Glove Awards for defensive excellence and retired with the second highest fielding percentage in AL history.

Herman Long, who retired in 1904 after setting major league records for games and putouts as a shortstop, is the all-time leader in errors committed as a shortstop with 1,070, nearly three times as many as any shortstop active since 1960, and the most by any player at a single position in major league history; he is the only shortstop to commit over 1,000 career errors. Bill Dahlen (975), Germany Smith (973), and Tommy Corcoran (961) are the only other shortstops to commit over 900 career errors. Tim Anderson, with 141 errors through the end of the 2025 season, is the active leader in errors by a shortstop, followed by Javier Báez with 130.

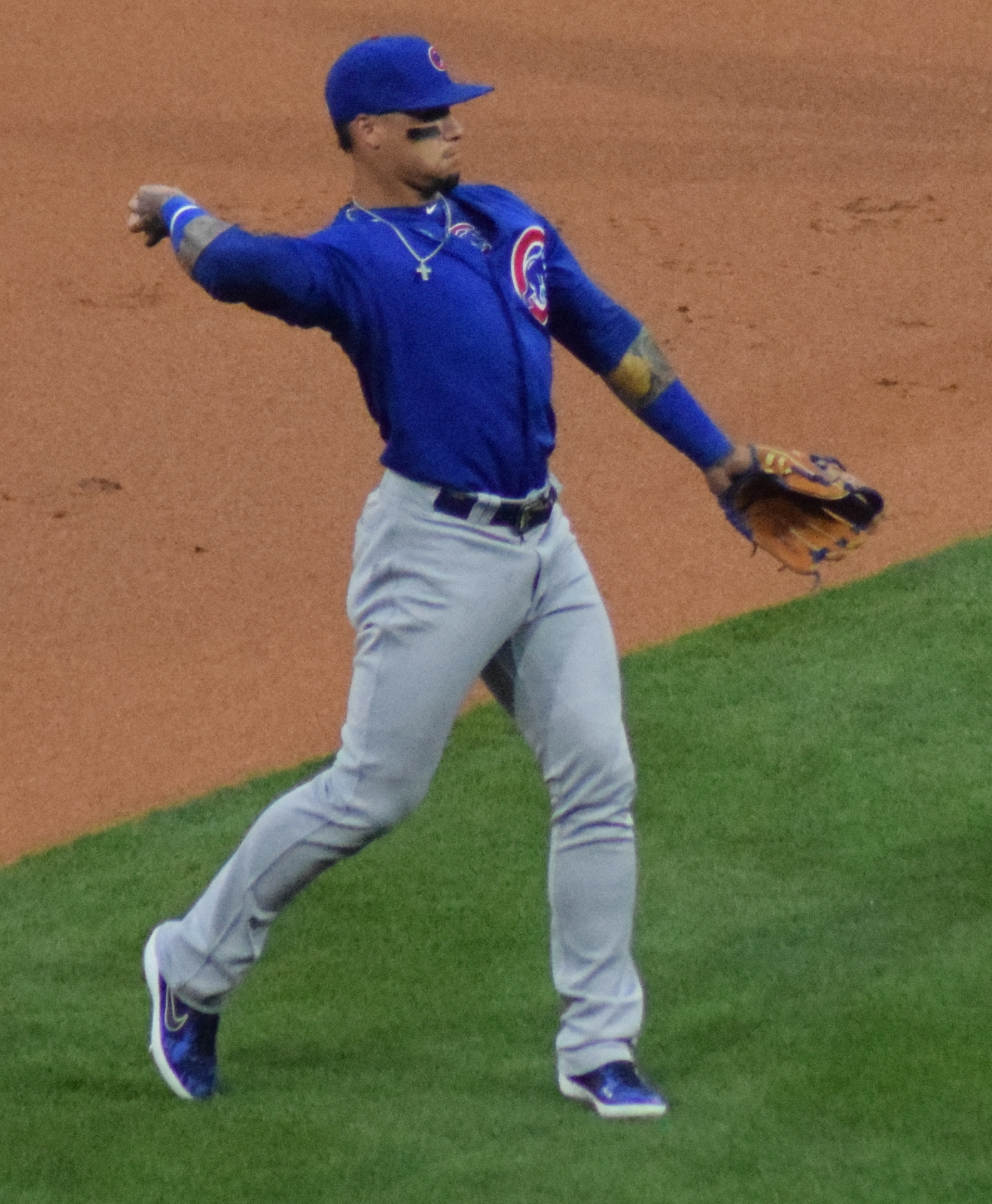
Javier Báez, the active leader and is tied for 247th in fielding errors as a shortstop.

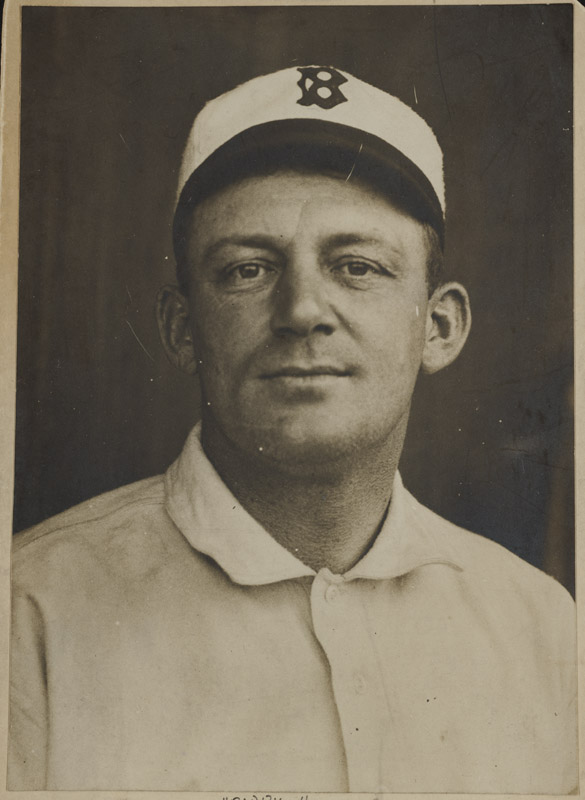
Bill Dahlen, second all-time in errors as a shortstop, holds the National League record of 975.

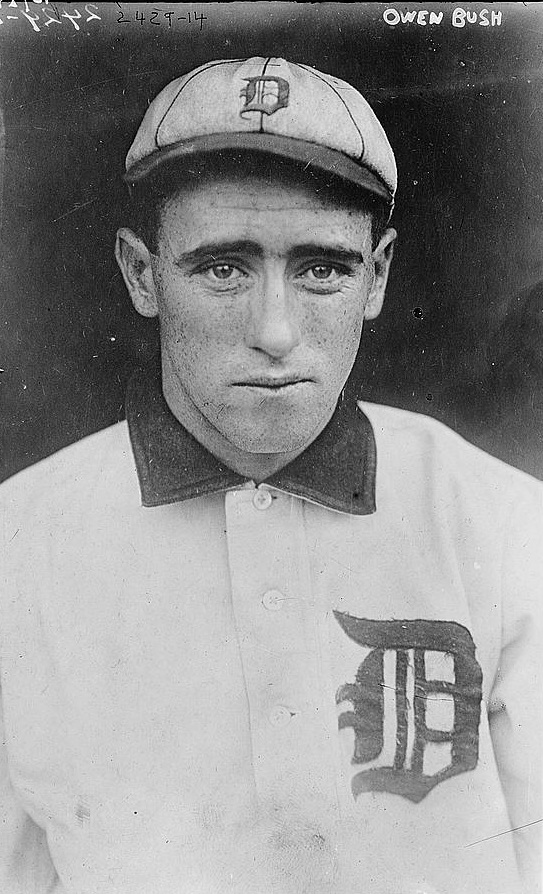
Donie Bush holds the American League record of 689 errors as a shortstop.

- Stats updated as of April 3, 2026.

Rank	Player (2025 Es)	E as SS
1	Herman Long	1,070
2	Bill Dahlen	975
3	Germany Smith	973
4	Tommy Corcoran	961
5	Ed McKean	857
6	Jack Glasscock	832
7	Monte Cross	812
8	Donie Bush	689
9	Bobby Wallace*	685
10	Honus Wagner*	676
11	Dave Bancroft*	660
12	Luke Appling*	643
13	Joe Tinker*	635
14	Rabbit Maranville*	631
15	Shorty Fuller	595
16	Arthur Irwin	594
17	Frank Fennelly	590
18	Bones Ely	578
19	Mickey Doolin	570
20	Roger Peckinpaugh	553
21	Bill Gleason	535
22	John Montgomery Ward*	530
23	Art Fletcher	521
24	George Davis*	511
25	Joe Cronin*	485
26	George McBride	484
27	Freddy Parent	473
28	Dick Bartell	471
29	Hughie Jennings*	470
30	Kid Elberfeld	458
31	Doc Lavan	455
32	Wally Gerber	439
33	Sam Wise	422
34	Ivy Olson	417
35	Frankie Crosetti	402
36	Arky Vaughan*	397
37	Frank Shugart	391
38	Chick Fulmer	389
39	Davy Force	388
	Pee Wee Reese*	388
	George Wright*	388
42	Sadie Houck	386
43	Garry Templeton	384
44	Travis Jackson*	381
45	John Peters	379
46	Dick Groat	374
47	Luis Aparicio*	366
	Al Bridwell	366
49	Bert Campaneris	365
50	Jack Rowe	364

Rank	Player (20025 Es)	E as SS
51	Heinie Wagner	356
52	Tom Burns	355
53	Glenn Wright	351
54	Candy Nelson	346
55	Alfredo Griffin	340
56	Bill Russell	339
57	Ray Chapman	336
58	Don Kessinger	334
59	Joe Sewell*	333
60	Bill White	332
61	Bob Allen	330
62	Lou Say	319
63	Dave Concepción	311
	Buck Weaver	311
65	Tom Carey	309
66	Leo Durocher*	307
67	Everett Scott	306
68	Billy Jurges	305
69	Rafael Ramírez	301
70	Chick Galloway	296
71	Rudy Hulswitt	294
72	Freddie Patek	293
73	Eddie Joost	291
74	Jack Berry	290
	Roy McMillan	290
76	Billy Rogell	287
77	Alvin Dark	286
	Mark Koenig	286
79	Maury Wills	284
80	Ozzie Smith*	281
81	Dickey Pearce	279
82	Paul Radford	276
83	Chris Speier	275
84	Charley O'Leary	273
85	Édgar Rentería	272
	Robin Yount*	272
87	Gene DeMontreville	270
88	Vern Stephens	269
89	Lyn Lary	268
	Zoilo Versalles	268
91	Larry Kopf	266
92	Phil Rizzuto*	263
93	Ed Brinkman	259
	Leo Cárdenas	259
95	Heinie Sand	258
96	Johnny Logan	256
97	Miguel Tejada	255
	Ned Williamson	255
99	Derek Jeter*	254
100	Marty Marion	252

=== Left fielders ===
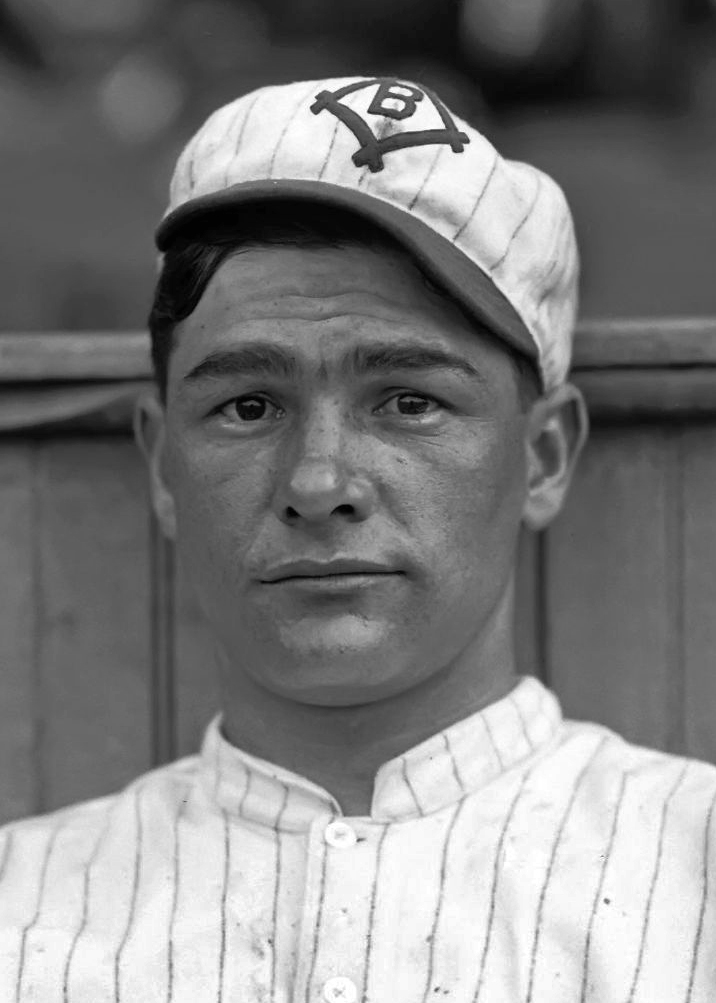
Zack Wheat, the modern leader in fielding errors as a left fielder.

The left fielder (LF) is one of the three outfielders, the defensive positions in baseball farthest from the batter. Left field is the area of the outfield to the left of a person standing at home plate and facing toward the pitcher's mound. The outfielders' duty is to try to catch long fly balls before they hit the ground or to quickly catch or retrieve and return to the infield any other balls entering the outfield. The left fielder must also be adept at navigating the area of left field where the foul line approaches the corner of the playing field and the walls of the seating areas. Being the outfielder closest to third base, the left fielder generally does not have to throw as far as the other outfielders to throw out runners advancing around the bases, so they often do not have the strongest throwing arm, but their throws need to be accurate. The left fielder normally plays behind the third baseman and shortstop, who play in or near the infield; unlike catchers and most infielders (excepting first basemen), who are virtually exclusively right-handed, left fielders can be either right- or left-handed. In the scoring system used to record defensive plays, the left fielder is assigned the number 7.

The list of career leaders is dominated by players from the early 20th century; only two of the top 16 players were active after 1945. Only four of the top 28 single-season totals were recorded after 1916, none after 1935; only four of the top 81 totals were recorded after 1940. To a large extent, the leaders reflect longevity rather than lower skill. Barry Bonds, whose 89 errors are the most by a National League (NL) left fielder since 1971, won eight Gold Glove Awards for defensive excellence.

Because game accounts and box scores often did not distinguish between the outfield positions, there has been some difficulty in determining precise defensive statistics prior to 1901; because of this, and because of the similarity in their roles, defensive statistics for the three positions are frequently combined. Although efforts to distinguish between the three positions regarding games played during this period and reconstruct the separate totals have been largely successful, separate error totals are unavailable; players whose totals are missing the figures for pre-1901 games are notated in the table below. Zack Wheat, who held the major league records for career games and putouts in left field for over 70 years, is the modern (post-1900) leader in career errors committed by a left fielder with 186, including the modern National League record of 184. Goose Goslin (184), Lou Brock (168), Bobby Veach (146), Jimmy Sheckard (139), Patsy Dougherty (133), Duffy Lewis (123), Bob Johnson (121), Jack Graney (114), Rickey Henderson (113), Ken Williams (109), Jesse Burkett (108), and Charlie Jamieson (103) are the only other left fielders charged with over 100 career errors after 1900. Eddie Rosario, who had 34 errors through the 2025 season to place him tied for 135th all-time, is the leader among active players.

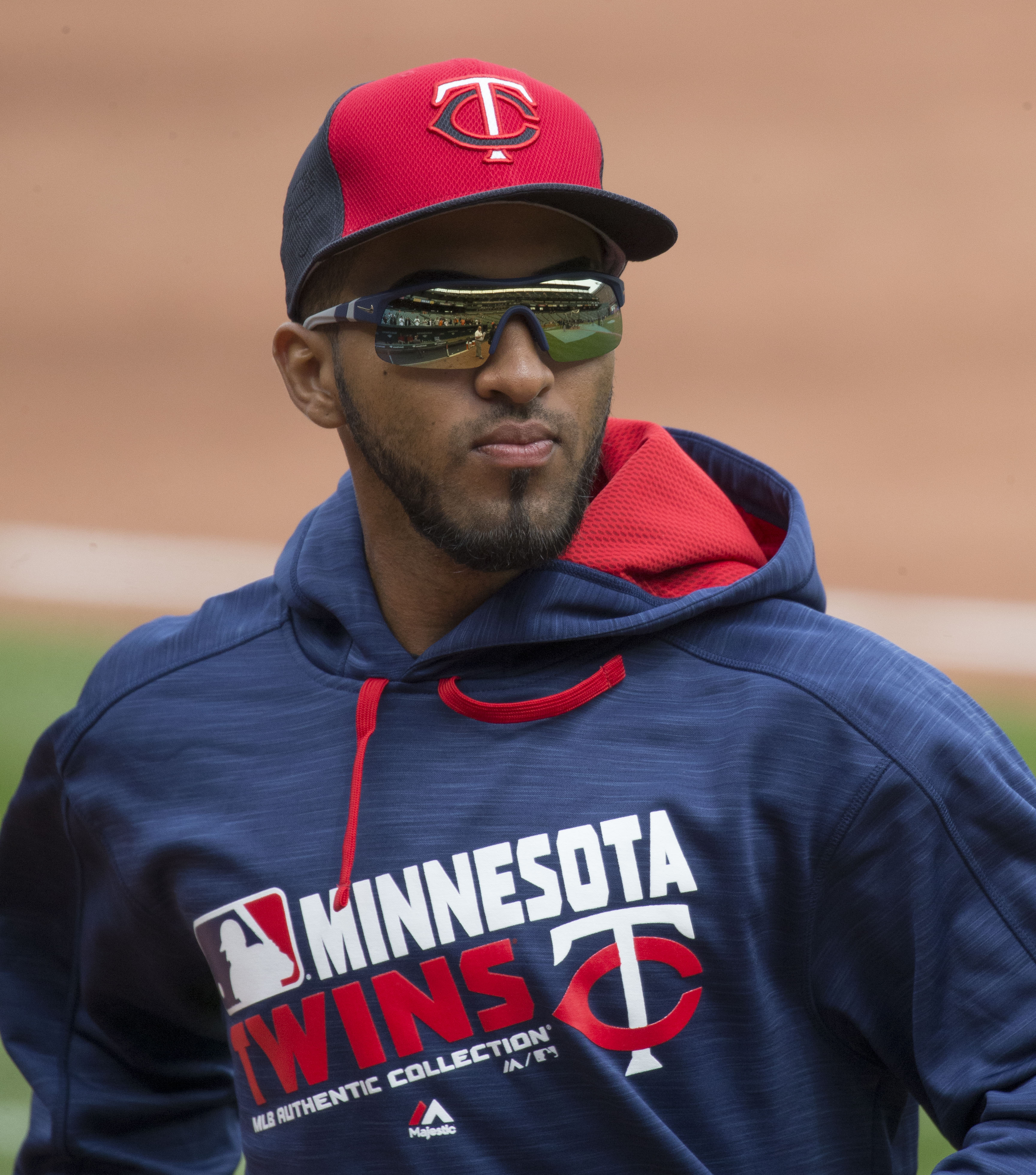
Eddie Rosario, the active leader and is tied for 135th all-time in fielding errors as a left fielder.

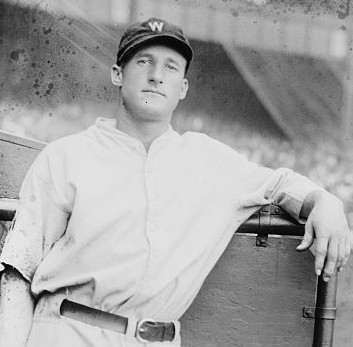
Goose Goslin holds the American League record.

- Stats updated through the end of the 2025 season.

Rank	Player (2025 Es)	E as LF
1	Zack Wheat*	186
2	Goose Goslin*	184
3	Lou Brock*	168
4	Bobby Veach	146
5	Jimmy Sheckard †	139
6	Patsy Dougherty	133
7	Duffy Lewis	123
8	Bob Johnson	121
9	Jack Graney	114
10	Rickey Henderson*	113
11	Ken Williams	109
12	Jesse Burkett* †	108
13	Charlie Jamieson	103
14	Bob Bescher	99
	Sherry Magee	99
16	Topsy Hartsel †	93
17	Ted Williams*	92
18	Barry Bonds	89
19	Joe Medwick*	86
	Minnie Miñoso*	86
	Burt Shotton	86
	Lonnie Smith	86
23	Gary Matthews	85
24	George Bell	83
25	Irish Meusel	82
	Tillie Walker	82
27	Bibb Falk	80
	Alex Johnson	80
	Willie Stargell*	80
30	George Burns	79
	Del Ennis	79
32	José Cruz	78
	Billy Williams*	78
34	Fred Clarke* †	76
35	Roy Johnson	74
36	Ralph Kiner*	73
37	Carson Bigbee	72
38	Gus Zernial	71
39	Jeff Heath	68
	George Stone	68
	Carl Yastrzemski*	68
42	George Barclay	67
	Rube Ellis	67
44	Luis Gonzalez	64
	Jo-Jo Moore	64
46	Matty McIntyre	63
	Joe Vosmik	63
	Gee Walker	63
49	Jim Rice*	62
	Kip Selbach †	62

Rank	Player (2025 Es)	E as LF
51	Babe Ruth*	61
	Moose Solters	61
53	Adam Dunn	60
	Sam Mertes †	60
55	Vince Coleman	59
	Leon Wagner	59
57	Albert Belle	58
58	Mike Donlin †	57
	Lefty O'Doul	57
60	Jimmy Slagle †	56
61	Willie Horton	55
	Greg Luzinski	55
63	Ralph Garr	54
	Heinie Manush*	54
	Alfonso Soriano	54
66	Pat Burrell	53
67	Ron Gant	52
	Steve Henderson	52
	Bob Meusel	52
	Hank Sauer	52
71	Max Carey*	50
	Tommy Davis	50
	George Foster	50
	Matt Holliday	50
	Carlos Lee	50
76	Cliff Floyd	49
	Dick Harley †	49
	Davy Jones	49
	Al Martin	49
	Ben Oglivie	49
	Rip Radcliff	49
	Bob Skinner	49
83	Bob Fothergill	48
	Chick Hafey*	48
	Tim Raines*	48
86	Joe Carter	47
	Pat Duncan	47
	Larry Herndon	47
	Al Simmons*	47
	Dick Wakefield	47
91	Augie Galan	46
	Jack McCarthy †	46
93	Moisés Alou	45
	Rube Bressler	45
	Les Mann	45
96	Rico Carty	44
97	Gil Coan	43
	Pete Incaviglia	43
	Mike Menosky	43
	John Stone	43

=== Center fielders ===
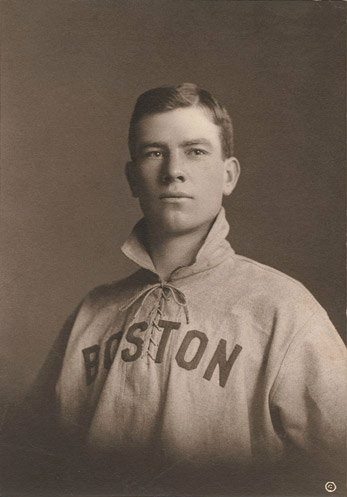
Tris Speaker, the modern leader in fielding errors as a center fielder.

The center fielder (CF) is one of the three outfielders, the defensive positions in baseball farthest from the batter. Center field is the area of the outfield directly in front of a person standing at home plate and facing beyond the pitcher's mound. The outfielders' duty is to try to catch long fly balls before they hit the ground or to quickly catch or retrieve and return to the infield any other balls entering the outfield. Generally having the most territory to cover, the center fielder is usually the fastest of the three outfielders, although this can also depend on the relative strength of their throwing arms and the configuration of their home field, due to the deepest part of center field being the farthest point from the infield and home plate. The center fielder normally plays behind the shortstop and second baseman, who play in or near the infield; unlike catchers and most infielders (excepting first basemen), who are virtually exclusively right-handed, center fielders can be either right- or left-handed. In the scoring system used to record defensive plays, the center fielder is assigned the number 8.

The list of career leaders is dominated by players from the early 20th century; only three of the top 25 players were active after 1953. Only nine of the top 71 single-season totals were recorded after 1927, only one after 1939; only five of the top 183 totals were recorded after 1964. To a large extent, the leaders reflect longevity rather than lower skill. Tris Speaker, who holds the modern (post-1900) record of 227 errors committed as a center fielder, is often regarded as the greatest outfielder in history, setting records for putouts and assists; Willie Mays, whose 139 errors are the most by a center fielder since 1930, won twelve Gold Glove Awards for defensive excellence.

Because game accounts and box scores often did not distinguish between the outfield positions, there has been some difficulty in determining precise defensive statistics prior to 1901; because of this, and because of the similarity in their roles, defensive statistics for the three positions are frequently combined. Although efforts to distinguish between the three positions regarding games played during this period and reconstruct the separate totals have been largely successful, separate error totals are unavailable; players whose totals are missing the figures for pre-1901 games are notated in the table below. Tris Speaker is the post-1900 leader in career errors committed as a center fielder with 227; Ty Cobb (208) is second, and is the only other center fielder to commit over 200 career errors. Andrew McCutchen, who had 37 errors through the 2025 season to place him tied for 140th all-time, is the leader among active players.

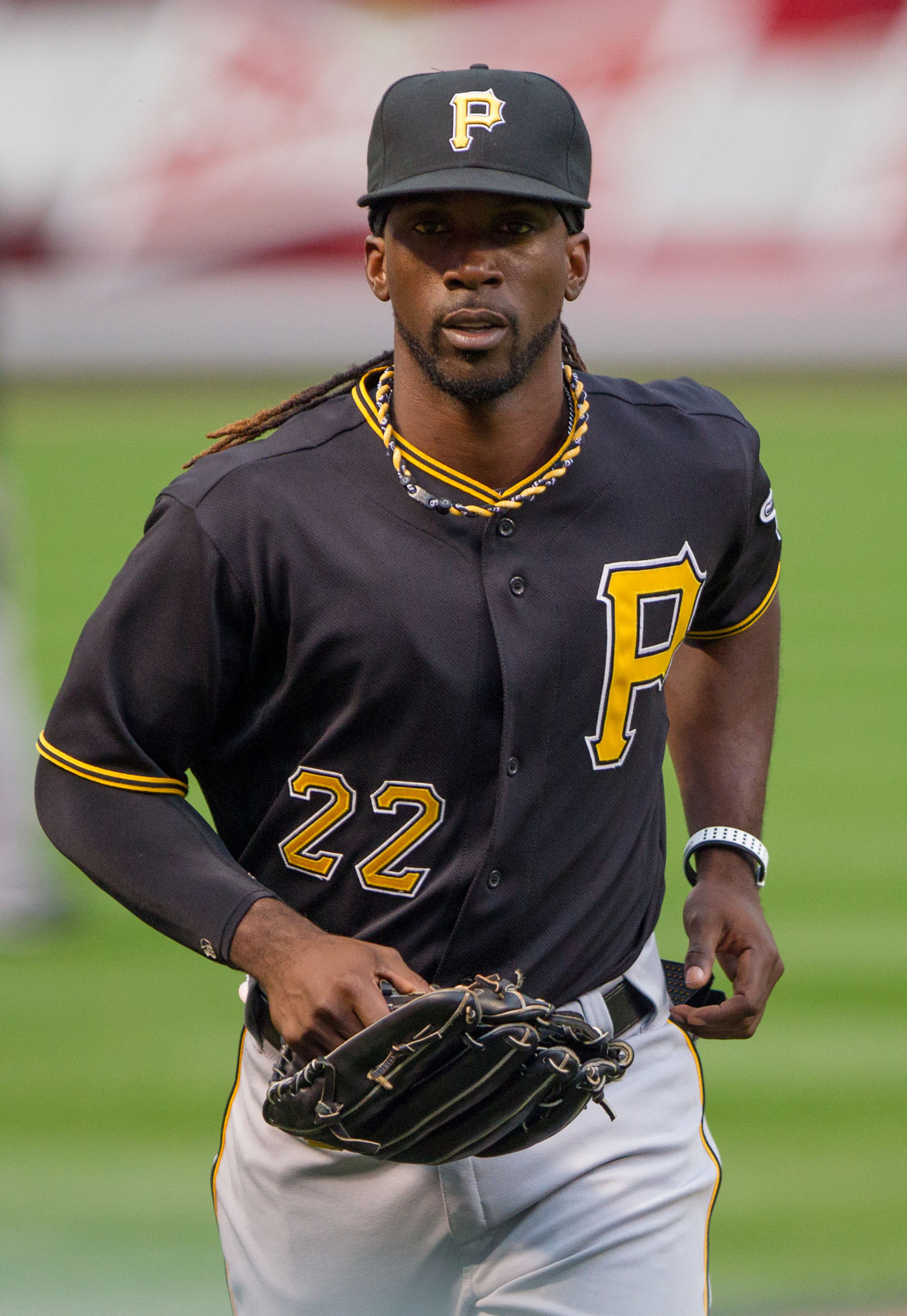
Andrew McCutchen, the active leader and is tied for 140th all-time in errors as a center fielder.

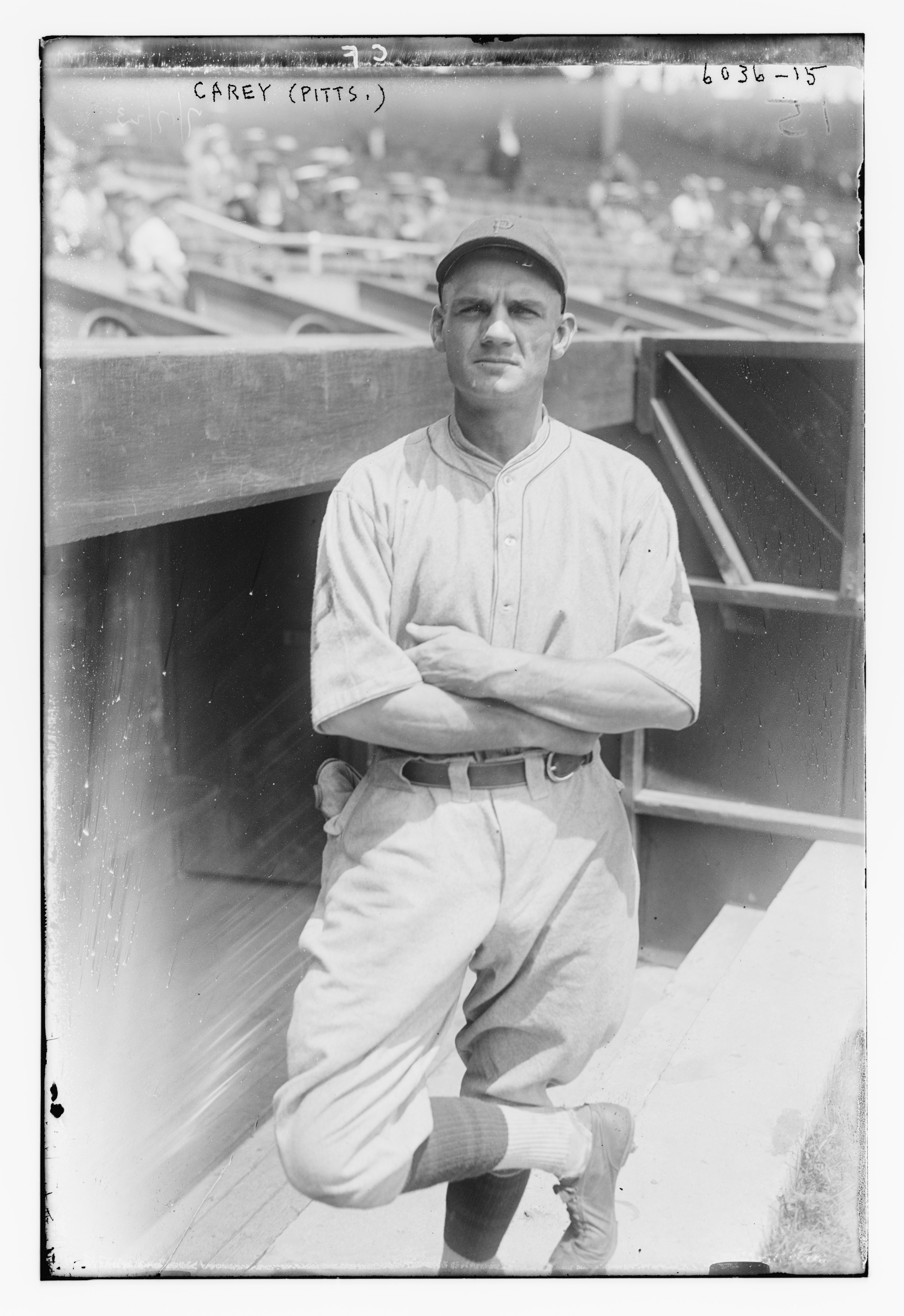
Max Carey holds the modern National League record.

- Stats updated through the end of the 2025 season.

Rank	Player	E as LF
1	Tris Speaker*	227
2	Ty Cobb*	208
3	Clyde Milan	192
4	Max Carey*	179
5	Cy Seymour †	143
6	Willie Mays*	139
7	Edd Roush*	134
8	Earl Averill*	122
9	Willie Davis	121
10	Dode Paskert	111
11	Richie Ashburn*	106
	Doc Cramer	106
13	Cy Williams	102
14	Joe DiMaggio*	100
15	Ginger Beaumont †	99
16	Rebel Oakes	92
	Burt Shotton	92
18	Sam Chapman	91
19	Taylor Douthit	90
20	Dom DiMaggio	89
21	Earle Combs*	88
22	Hy Myers	87
23	Baby Doll Jacobson	86
24	Hack Wilson*	84
25	Sam Rice*	80
26	Kenny Lofton	78
	Willie McGee	78
	Lloyd Waner*	78
29	Bill Bruton	77
	Johnny Mostil	77
	Vada Pinson	77
	Ray Powell	77
33	Ken Griffey Jr.*	76
	Garry Maddox	76
35	Benny Kauff	75
	Tilly Walker	75
37	Sam West	72
38	Wally Berger	71
	Fred Schulte	71
40	Johnny Bates	70
	Ron LeFlore	70
	Bill Virdon	70
43	Mickey Mantle*	67
	Homer Smoot	67
	Roy Thomas †	67
46	Tommy Leach †	66
47	Joe Birmingham	65
	Rick Monday	65
	Devon White	65
50	Mike Cameron	64

Rank	Player	E as LF
	Chick Stahl †	64
52	Steve Finley	63
	Charlie Hemphill †	63
	Danny Hoffman	63
55	Jimmy Barrett †	61
	Emmet Heidrick †	61
57	Carlos Beltrán*	60
58	Tommie Agee	59
	Lance Johnson	59
60	Marquis Grissom	58
	Chet Lemon	58
	Jack Smith	58
	Duke Snider*	58
64	Vince DiMaggio	57
	Mike Kreevich	57
	Nemo Leibold	57
	Fred Snodgrass	57
68	Adam Jones	56
	Fielder Jones †	56
	Omar Moreno	56
	Jigger Statz	56
72	Ben Chapman	55
	Mickey Rivers	55
74	César Cedeño	54
	Kiki Cuyler*	54
	Jim Edmonds	54
	Curt Flood	54
	Billy North	54
	Turkey Stearnes*	54 (includes incomplete Negro league totals)
	Jimmy Wynn	54
81	Paul Blair	53
82	John Dobbs	52
83	Vin Campbell	51
	Happy Felsch	51
	Harry Rice	51
86	Ping Bodie	50
	Larry Doby*	50
	Rick Manning	50
	Lloyd Moseby	50
90	Dave Fultz †	49
	Fred Lynn	49
92	Terry Moore	48
	Reggie Smith	48
	Amos Strunk	48
95	Al Simmons*	47
	Jo-Jo White	47
	Bernie Williams	47
98	Andre Dawson *	46
	Ira Flagstead	46
	Cliff Heathcote	46
	Dwayne Murphy	46
	Gee Walker	46

=== Right fielders ===
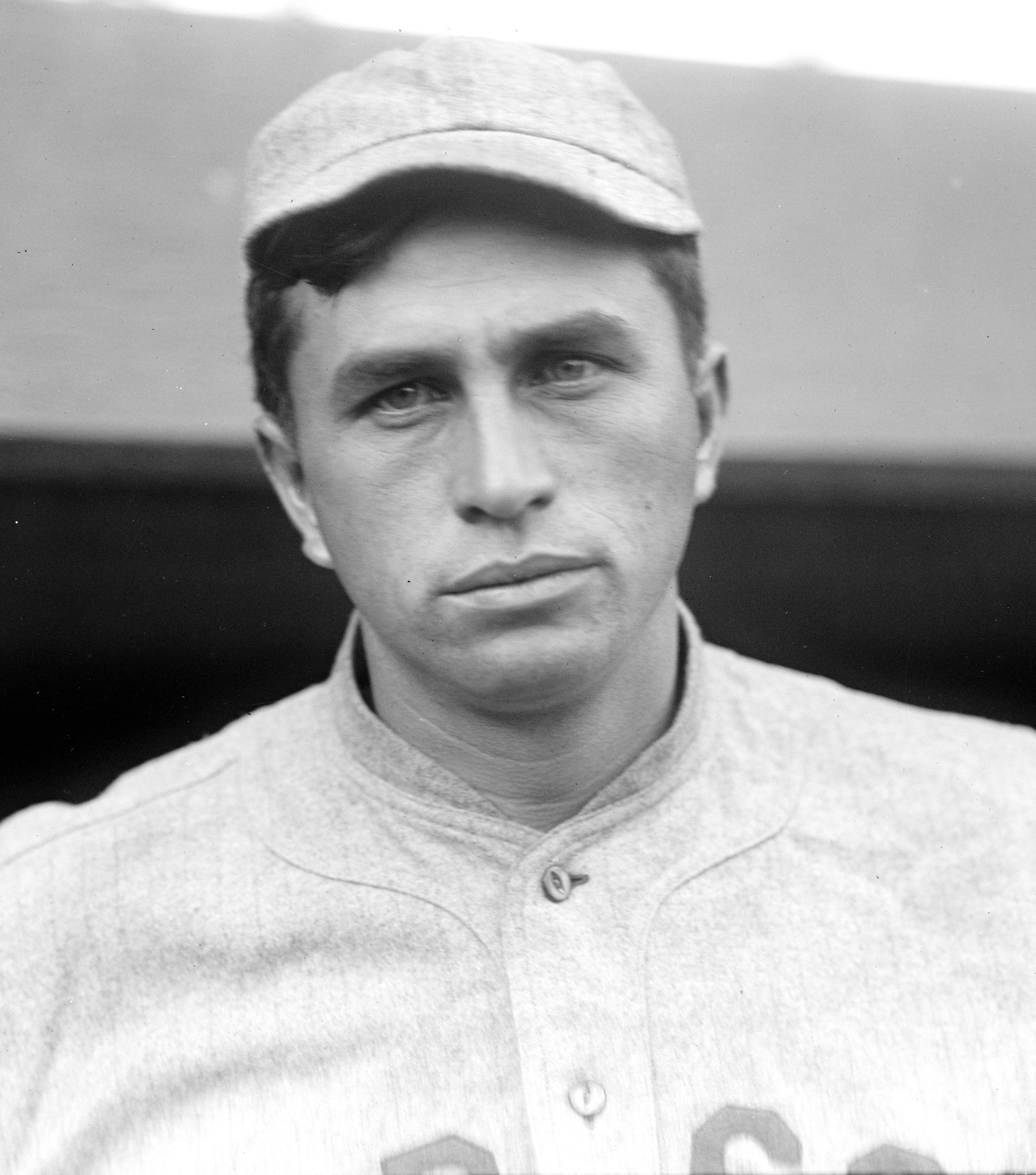
Harry Hooper, the modern leader in fielding errors as a right fielder.

The right fielder (RF) is one of the three outfielders, the defensive positions in baseball farthest from the batter. Right field is the area of the outfield to the right of a person standing at home plate and facing toward the pitcher's mound. The outfielders must try to catch long fly balls before they hit the ground or to quickly catch or retrieve and return to the infield any other balls entering the outfield. The right fielder must also be adept at navigating the area of right field where the foul line approaches the corner of the playing field and the walls of the seating areas. Being the outfielder farthest from third base, the right fielder often has to make longer throws than the other outfielders to throw out runners advancing around the bases, so they often have the strongest or most accurate throwing arm. The right fielder normally plays behind the second baseman and first baseman, who play in or near the infield; unlike catchers and most infielders (excepting first basemen), who are virtually exclusively right-handed, right fielders can be either right- or left-handed. In the scoring system used to record defensive plays, the right fielder is assigned the number 9, the highest number.

The list of career leaders is dominated by players from the early 20th century; only six of the top 20 players were active after 1951, only one of whom played primarily in the American League. Only nine of the top 91 single-season totals were recorded after 1939, only four after 1979. To a large extent, the leaders reflect longevity rather than lower skill.

Because game accounts and box scores often did not distinguish between the outfield positions, there has been some difficulty in determining precise defensive statistics prior to 1901; because of this, and because of the similarity in their roles, defensive statistics for the three positions are frequently combined. Although efforts to distinguish between the three positions regarding games played during this period and reconstruct the separate totals have been largely successful, separate error totals are unavailable. Players whose totals are missing the figures for pre-1901 games are noted in the table below. Harry Hooper is the modern (post-1900) leader in career errors committed by a right fielder with 144. Dave Parker is second all-time and holds the modern National League record with 134 career errors in right field. Only fourteen right fielders have committed more than 100 career errors at the position since 1900. Giancarlo Stanton, who had 46 errors through the end of the 2025 season to place him tied for 90th all-time, is the leader among active players.

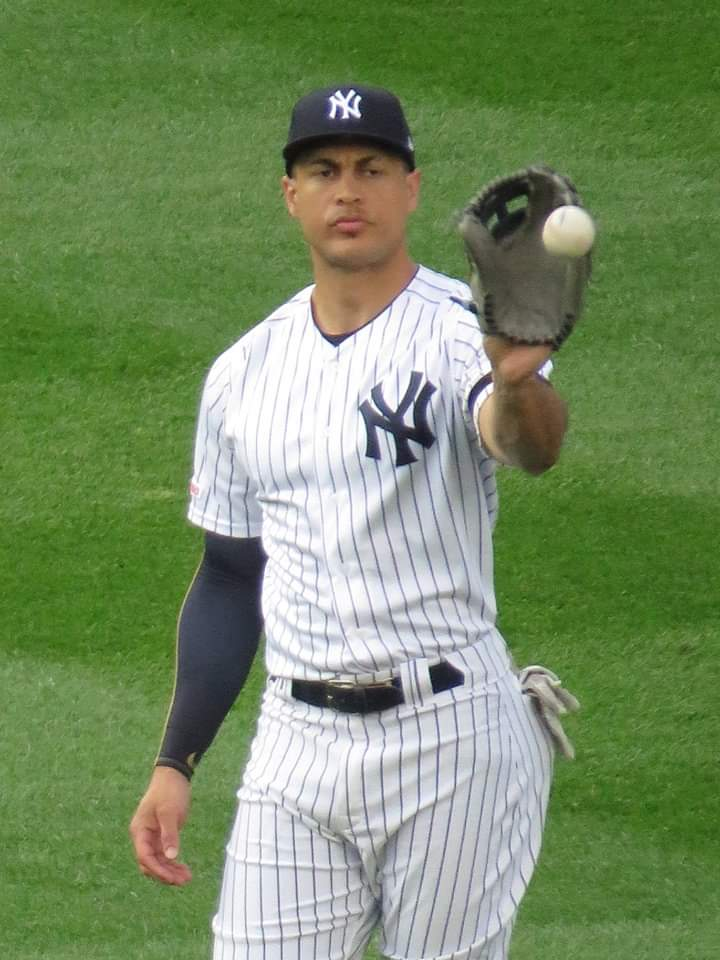
Giancarlo Stanton, the active leader and tied for 90th all-time in fielding errors as a right fielder.

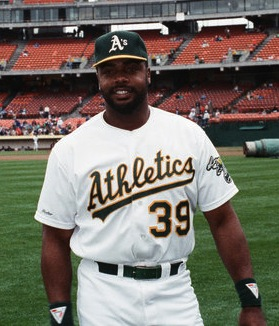
Dave Parker hold the National League record of 134 errors, as well hold the single-season record for putouts at right field.

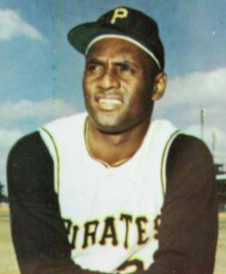
Roberto Clemente commit 131 career errors, as well hold the league record for assists at right field.

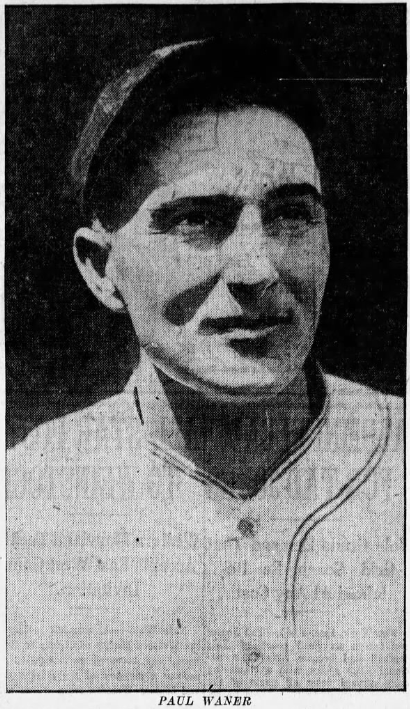
Paul Waner commit 131 errors in his career.

- Stats updated through the end of the 2025 season.

Rank	Player (2025 Es)	E as RF
1	Harry Hooper*	144
2	Dave Parker*	134
3	Roberto Clemente*	131
	Paul Waner*	131
5	Reggie Jackson*	126
6	Vladimir Guerrero*	125
7	Ross Youngs*	116
8	Sammy Sosa	111
9	Harry Heilmann*	109
10	Chuck Klein*	107
11	Bruce Campbell	104
	Tommy Griffith	104
13	Sam Rice*	101
	Curt Walker	101
15	Wally Moses	99
16	George Browne	96
17	Rusty Staub	95
	Jack Tobin	95
19	Gavvy Cravath	93
20	Sam Crawford* †	92
21	Hank Aaron*	88
	Mel Ott*	88
23	John Titus	87
24	Rubén Sierra	86
25	Babe Herman	85
26	Babe Ruth*	84
27	Elmer Flick* †	77
28	Bobby Abreu	71
	Bobby Bonds	71
	Dixie Walker	71
31	Steve Evans	68
32	José Guillén	67
	Mike Mitchell	67
34	Harry Lumley	66
35	Roy Johnson	65
	Raúl Mondesí	65
	Tim Salmon	65
	Chief Wilson	65
39	Frank Schulte	64
40	Willie Keeler* †	63
	Bill Nicholson	63
	Casey Stengel*	63
	Claudell Washington	63
44	Dave Winfield*	62
45	Jeromy Burnitz	61
	Shano Collins	61
	Jermaine Dye	61
	Al Kaline*	61
49	Dwight Evans	60
	Max Flack	60

Rank	Player (2025 Es)	E as RF
51	Carl Furillo	59
	Jackie Jensen	59
	Bing Miller	59
	Danny Moeller	59
	Tony Oliva*	59
56	Cozy Dolan †	58
	Billy Southworth*	58
	Darryl Strawberry	58
59	Jesse Barfield	57
	Ty Cobb*	57
	Bob Meusel	57
	Red Murray	57
63	Pete Fox	56
	Tony Gwynn*	56
	Enos Slaughter*	56
	Homer Summa	56
67	Rocky Colavito	55
68	Elmer Valo	54
69	Elmer Smith	53
70	Tom Brunansky	52
	Mike Davis	52
72	Wally Post	51
	Socks Seybold †	51
74	Rob Deer	50
	Ival Goodman	50
	Eddie Murphy	50
	Ken Singleton	50
	Justin Upton	50
79	Mark Whiten	49
80	Jay Bruce	48
	Johnny Callison	48
	Shoeless Joe Jackson	48
	Dave Robertson	48
	Braggo Roth	48
85	Wilbur Good	47
	Danny Green †	47
	Gene Moore	47
	Reggie Smith	47
	Larry Walker*	47
90	Harold Baines*	46
	Jack Clark	46
	Shawn Green	46
	Giancarlo Stanton (0)	46
94	Kiki Cuyler*	45
	Dan Ford	45
	Jeff Francoeur	45
	Lance Richbourg	45
	George Watkins	45
	Earl Webb	45
	Glenn Wilson	45
