= Germany Smith =

American baseball player (1863–1927)

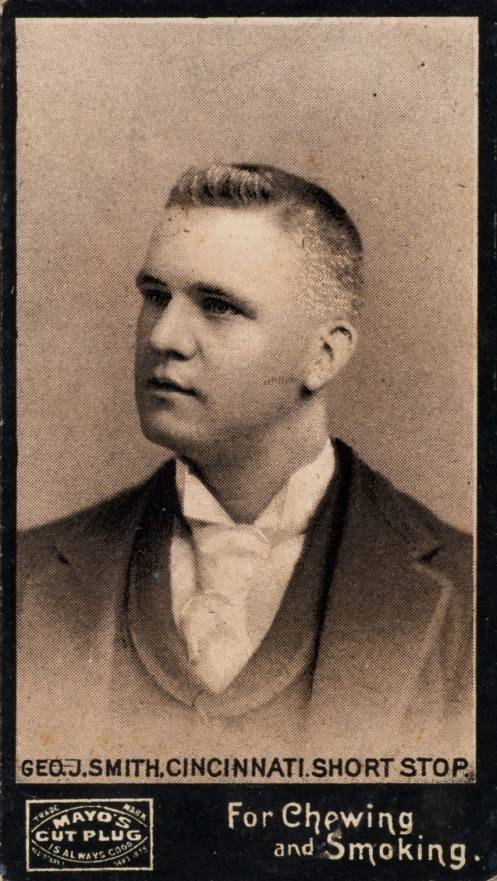
- 1895 baseball card of Smith
- Shortstop
- Born: April 21, 1863; Pittsburgh, Pennsylvania, U.S.
- Died: December 1, 1927 (aged 64); Altoona, Pennsylvania, U.S.
- Batted: Right Threw: Right

MLB debut
- April 17, 1884, for the Altoona Mountain City

Last MLB appearance
- October 9, 1898, for the St. Louis Browns

MLB statistics
- Batting average: .243
- Home runs: 47
- Runs batted in: 800
- Stats at Baseball Reference

Teams
- Altoona Mountain City (1884); Cleveland Blues (1884); Brooklyn Grays / Bridegrooms (1885–1890); Cincinnati Reds (1891–1896); Brooklyn Bridegrooms (1897); St. Louis Browns (1898)

George J. "Germany" Smith (April 21, 1863 – December 1, 1927) was an American Major League Baseball player from Pittsburgh, Pennsylvania. Primarily a shortstop, Smith played for five teams in 15 seasons. He is fourth all time in Major League Baseball in errors committed with 1,009.

Smith made his major league debut for Altoona Mountain City of the Union Association in 1884. After Altoona's team folded after just 25 games, he jumped to the Cleveland Blues of the National League. After the 1884 season, Cleveland then sold him, along with six other players, to the Brooklyn Bridegrooms for $4,000.

On June 17, 1885, Smith reportedly committed seven errors intentionally when his team decided to punish new pitcher Phenomenal Smith, losing the game 18–5. All 18 runs against the brash left-hander were unearned‚ due to a total of 14 Brooklyn "errors." "Phenomenal" gave himself his nickname before he joined the team‚ saying that he was so good that he did not need his teammates to win. The intentional misplays of his teammates caused club president Lynch to fine the guilty players $500 each‚ but he reluctantly agreed to release "Phenomenal" to ensure team harmony.

A reliable shortstop in the days when a fielding average below .900 could lead the league, Smith led American Association shortstops in 1887 with an .886 average. That was also his most productive offensive season, relative to his peers, with an OPS+ of 107. When the AA folded in 1890, Smith and most of his teammates transferred to the National League's new Brooklyn franchise. In 1891, John Montgomery Ward took over as manager and shortstop, effectively ending Smith's career with Brooklyn, so he left and joined the Cincinnati Reds. There, he led NL shortstops in assists each year from 1891 to 1894. Smith returned to the Brooklyn in 1897, when the Reds and Grooms swapped shortstops, with Tommy Corcoran moving to Cincinnati.

Smith's major league career came to an end after the 1898 season, when he played just 51 games for the St. Louis Browns. He moved on to play for the minor league Minneapolis Millers for the 1899 and 1900 seasons.

Smith died at the age of 64 in Altoona, Pennsylvania, from injuries when struck by a motorist. He is interred at Calvary Cemetery in Altoona.
