= Columbus Solons all-time roster =

List of baseball players

The following is a list of players and who appeared in at least one game for the Columbus Solons Major League Baseball franchise of the American Association from 1889 through 1891.

== B ==
- Mark Baldwin
- Ned Bligh

== C ==
- Elton Chamberlain
- Ed Clark
- Dad Clarke
- Elmer Cleveland
- Jack Crooks

== D ==
- Ed Daily
- John Dolan
- Jim Donahue
- Tom Dowse
- Jack Doyle
- Charlie Duffee

== E ==
- Henry Easterday
- Jack Easton

== F ==
- Tom Ford

== G ==
- Hank Gastright
- Bill George
- Bill Greenwood

== J ==
- Spud Johnson

== K ==
- Heinie Kappel
- Rudy Kemmler
- Frank Knauss
- Phil Knell
- Bill Kuehne

== L ==
- Mike Lehane
- Jack Leiper
- John Lyston

== M ==
- Lefty Marr
- Al Mays
- Sparrow McCaffrey
- Jim McTamany
- John Munyan

== N ==
- Sam Nicholl

== O ==
- Jack O'Connor
- Tim O'Rourke
- Dave Orr

== P ==
- Jimmy Peoples

== R ==
- Charlie Reilly

== S ==
- John Sneed
- Jim Sullivan

== T ==
- Larry Twitchell

== W ==
- John Weyhing
- Bobby Wheelock
- Wild Bill Widner
