= 1890 Columbus Solons season =

1890 Columbus Solons
- League: American Association
- Ballpark: Recreation Park
- City: Columbus, Ohio
- Record: 79–55 (.590)
- League place: 2nd
- Managers: Al Buckenberger, Gus Schmelz, Pat Sullivan

The 1890 Columbus Solons season was a season in American baseball. The team finished with a 79–55 record, second place in the American Association.

== Regular season ==
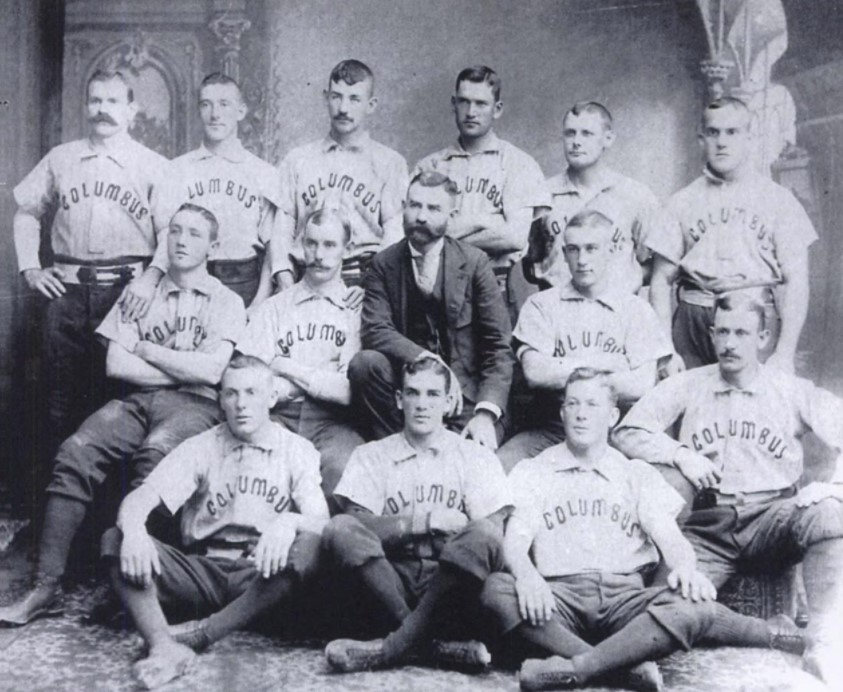
1890 Columbus Solons

=== Season standings ===
American Association
Team	W	L	Pct.	GB	Home	Road
Louisville Colonels	88	44	.667	—	57‍–‍13	31‍–‍31
Columbus Solons	79	55	.590	10	47‍–‍22	32‍–‍33
St. Louis Browns	78	58	.574	12	45‍–‍25	33‍–‍33
Toledo Maumees	68	64	.515	20	40‍–‍27	28‍–‍37
Rochester Broncos	63	63	.500	22	40‍–‍22	23‍–‍41
Baltimore Orioles	15	19	.441	24	8‍–‍11	7‍–‍8
Syracuse Stars	55	72	.433	30½	30‍–‍30	25‍–‍42
Philadelphia Athletics	54	78	.409	34	36‍–‍36	18‍–‍42
Brooklyn Gladiators	26	73	.263	45½	15‍–‍22	11‍–‍51

=== Record vs. opponents ===
1890 American Association record Sources:
Team	BAL	BKG	COL	LOU	PHA	RCH	STL	SYR	TOL
Baltimore	—	0–0	2–4–2	1–2–1	2–2	5–1	2–5	1–2	2–3–1
Brooklyn	0–0	—	5–9	2–13	2–10	3–10–1	4–10	5–12	5–9
Columbus	4–2–2	9–5	—	10–8–1	11–9	10–9–1	12–8–2	10–7	13–7
Louisville	2–1–1	13–2	8–10–1	—	17–3	11–6–2	9–11	14–5	14–6
Philadelphia	2–2	10–2	9–11	3–17	—	7–12	7–13	10–7	6–14
Rochester	1–5	10–3–1	9–10–1	6–11–2	12–7	—	8–12–1	11–4–1	6–11–1
St. Louis	5–2	10–4	8–12–2	11–9	13–7	12–8–1	—	10–9	9–7
Syracuse	2–1	12–5	7–10	5–14	7–10	4–11–1	9–10	—	9–11
Toledo	3–2–1	9–5	7–13	6–14	14–6	11–6–1	7–9	11–9	—

=== Notable transactions ===
- May 8, 1890: John Munyan was released by the Solons.

=== Roster ===
1890 Columbus Solons
Roster
Pitchers: Ice Box Chamberlain; Jack Easton; Tom Ford; Hank Gastright; Frank Knauss; Al Mays; Wild Bill Widner	Catchers: Ned Bligh; Jack Doyle; Jack O'Connor; Infielders: Jack Crooks; Henry Easterday; Mike Lehane; Charlie Reilly; Bobby Wheelock	Outfielders: Spud Johnson; Jim McTamany; John Munyan; Sam Nicholl; John Sneed	Manager: Al Buckenberger; Gus Schmelz; Pat Sullivan

== Player stats ==
=== Batting ===
==== Starters by position ====
Note: Pos = Position; G = Games played; AB = At bats; H = Hits; Avg. = Batting average; HR = Home runs; RBI = Runs batted in

Pos	Player	G	AB	H	Avg.	HR	RBI
C	Jack O'Connor	121	457	148	.324	2	66
1B	Mike Lehane	140	512	108	.211	0	56
2B	Jack Crooks	135	485	107	.221	1	62
SS	Henry Easterday	58	197	31	.157	1	17
3B	Charlie Reilly	137	530	141	.266	4	77
OF	Spud Johnson	135	538	186	.346	1	113
OF	John Sneed	128	484	141	.291	2	65
OF	Jim McTamany	125	466	120	.258	1	48

==== Other batters ====
Note: G = Games played; AB = At bats; H = Hits; Avg. = Batting average; HR = Home runs; RBI = Runs batted in

Player	G	AB	H	Avg.	HR	RBI
Jack Doyle	77	298	80	.268	2	44
Bobby Wheelock	52	190	45	.237	1	16
Sam Nicholl	14	56	9	.161	0	4
Ned Bligh	8	29	6	.207	0	5
John Munyan	2	7	1	.143	0	0

=== Pitching ===
==== Starting pitchers ====
Note: G = Games pitched; IP = Innings pitched; W = Wins; L = Losses; ERA = Earned run average; SO = Strikeouts

Player	G	IP	W	L	ERA	SO
Hank Gastright	48	401.1	30	14	2.94	199
Frank Knauss	37	275.2	17	12	2.81	148
Jack Easton	37	255.2	15	14	3.52	147
Ice Box Chamberlain	25	175.0	12	6	2.21	114
Wild Bill Widner	13	96.0	4	8	3.28	14
Al Mays	1	9.0	0	1	8.00	2

==== Relief pitchers ====
Note: G = Games pitched; W = Wins; L = Losses; SV = Saves; ERA = Earned run average; SO = Strikeouts

Player	G	W	L	SV	ERA	SO
Tom Ford	1	0	0	0	0.00	0
