= 1890 St. Louis Browns season =

Major League Baseball season

1890 St. Louis Browns
- League: American Association
- Ballpark: Sportsman's Park
- City: St. Louis, Missouri
- Record: 78–58 (.574)
- League place: 3rd
- Owner: Chris von der Ahe
- Managers: Tommy McCarthy (15–12); John Kerins (9–8); Chief Roseman (7–8); Count Campau (27–14); Joe Gerhardt (20–16)
- Stats: ESPN.com; Baseball Reference

The 1890 St. Louis Browns season was the team's ninth season in St. Louis, Missouri and its ninth season in the American Association. The Browns went 78–58 during the season and finished third in the American Association.

== Regular season ==
=== Season standings ===
American Association
| Team | W | L | Pct. | GB | Home | Road |
|---|---|---|---|---|---|---|
| Louisville Colonels | 88 | 44 | .667 | — | 57‍–‍13 | 31‍–‍31 |
| Columbus Solons | 79 | 55 | .590 | 10 | 47‍–‍22 | 32‍–‍33 |
| St. Louis Browns | 78 | 58 | .574 | 12 | 45‍–‍25 | 33‍–‍33 |
| Toledo Maumees | 68 | 64 | .515 | 20 | 40‍–‍27 | 28‍–‍37 |
| Rochester Broncos | 63 | 63 | .500 | 22 | 40‍–‍22 | 23‍–‍41 |
| Baltimore Orioles | 15 | 19 | .441 | 24 | 8‍–‍11 | 7‍–‍8 |
| Syracuse Stars | 55 | 72 | .433 | 30½ | 30‍–‍30 | 25‍–‍42 |
| Philadelphia Athletics | 54 | 78 | .409 | 34 | 36‍–‍36 | 18‍–‍42 |
| Brooklyn Gladiators | 26 | 73 | .263 | 45½ | 15‍–‍22 | 11‍–‍51 |

=== Record vs. opponents ===
1890 American Association record Sources:
| Team | BAL | BKG | COL | LOU | PHA | RCH | STL | SYR | TOL |
|---|---|---|---|---|---|---|---|---|---|
| Baltimore | — | 0–0 | 2–4–2 | 1–2–1 | 2–2 | 5–1 | 2–5 | 1–2 | 2–3–1 |
| Brooklyn | 0–0 | — | 5–9 | 2–13 | 2–10 | 3–10–1 | 4–10 | 5–12 | 5–9 |
| Columbus | 4–2–2 | 9–5 | — | 10–8–1 | 11–9 | 10–9–1 | 12–8–2 | 10–7 | 13–7 |
| Louisville | 2–1–1 | 13–2 | 8–10–1 | — | 17–3 | 11–6–2 | 9–11 | 14–5 | 14–6 |
| Philadelphia | 2–2 | 10–2 | 9–11 | 3–17 | — | 7–12 | 7–13 | 10–7 | 6–14 |
| Rochester | 1–5 | 10–3–1 | 9–10–1 | 6–11–2 | 12–7 | — | 8–12–1 | 11–4–1 | 6–11–1 |
| St. Louis | 5–2 | 10–4 | 8–12–2 | 11–9 | 13–7 | 12–8–1 | — | 10–9 | 9–7 |
| Syracuse | 2–1 | 12–5 | 7–10 | 5–14 | 7–10 | 4–11–1 | 9–10 | — | 9–11 |
| Toledo | 3–2–1 | 9–5 | 7–13 | 6–14 | 14–6 | 11–6–1 | 7–9 | 11–9 | — |

=== Roster ===
1890 St. Louis Browns
Roster
| Pitchers: Ice Box Chamberlain; Billy Hart; Joe Neale; George Nicol; Toad Ramsey; Jack Stivetts; Bill Whitrock; Catchers: Jim Adams; Billy Earle; Dad Meek; John Munyan; Mike Trost; Jake Wells | Infielders: Joe Burke; Ed Cartwright; Gus Creely; Jumbo Davis; Jim Donnelly; Shorty Fuller; Joe Gerhardt; Pat Hartnett; Joseph Herr; Bill Higgins; Jerry Kane; John Kerins; Billy Klusman; Frank Millard; Pete Sweeney | Outfielders: Count Campau; Charlie Duffee; Tom Gettinger; Tommy McCarthy; Dusty Miller; Ed Pabst; Chief Roseman | Manager: Count Campau; Joe Gerhardt; John Kerins; Tommy McCarthy; Chief Roseman |

== Player stats ==
=== Batting ===
==== Starters by position ====
Note: Pos = Position; G = Games played; AB = At bats; H = Hits; Avg. = Batting average; HR = Home runs; RBI = Runs batted in

| Pos | Player | G | AB | H | Avg. | HR | RBI |
|---|---|---|---|---|---|---|---|
| C | John Munyan | 96 | 342 | 91 | .266 | 4 | 42 |
| 1B | Ed Cartwright | 75 | 300 | 90 | .300 | 8 | 60 |
| 2B | Bill Higgins | 67 | 258 | 65 | .252 | 0 | 35 |
| SS | Shorty Fuller | 130 | 526 | 146 | .278 | 1 | 40 |
| 3B | Jumbo Davis | 21 | 71 | 18 | .254 | 0 | 13 |
| OF | Count Campau | 75 | 314 | 101 | .322 | 9 | 75 |
| OF | Charlie Duffee | 98 | 378 | 104 | .275 | 3 | 54 |
| OF | Tommy McCarthy | 133 | 548 | 192 | .350 | 6 | 69 |

==== Other batters ====
Note: G = Games played; AB = At bats; H = Hits; Avg. = Batting average; HR = Home runs; RBI = Runs batted in

| Player | G | AB | H | Avg. | HR | RBI |
|---|---|---|---|---|---|---|
| Chief Roseman | 80 | 302 | 103 | .341 | 2 | 58 |
| Tom Gettinger | 58 | 227 | 54 | .238 | 3 | 30 |
| Pete Sweeney | 49 | 190 | 34 | .179 | 0 | 10 |
| Joe Gerhardt | 37 | 125 | 32 | .256 | 1 | 11 |
| Jake Wells | 30 | 105 | 25 | .238 | 0 | 12 |
| Dusty Miller | 26 | 96 | 21 | .219 | 1 | 10 |
| Billy Earle | 22 | 73 | 17 | .233 | 0 | 12 |
| Billy Klusman | 15 | 65 | 18 | .277 | 1 | 11 |
| John Kerins | 18 | 63 | 8 | .127 | 0 | 3 |
| Pat Hartnett | 14 | 53 | 10 | .189 | 0 | 4 |
| Mike Trost | 17 | 51 | 13 | .255 | 1 | 7 |
| Jim Donnelly | 11 | 42 | 14 | .333 | 0 | 13 |
| Joseph Herr | 12 | 41 | 9 | .220 | 0 | 1 |
| Jerry Kane | 8 | 25 | 5 | .200 | 0 | 2 |
| Dad Meek | 4 | 16 | 5 | .313 | 0 | 1 |
| Gus Creely | 4 | 15 | 0 | .000 | 0 | 0 |
| Ed Pabst | 4 | 14 | 2 | .143 | 0 | 0 |
| Joe Burke | 2 | 6 | 4 | .667 | 0 | 2 |
| Jim Adams | 1 | 4 | 1 | .250 | 0 | 0 |
| Frank Millard | 1 | 1 | 0 | .000 | 0 | 0 |

=== Pitching ===
==== Starting pitchers ====
Note: G = Games pitched; IP = Innings pitched; W = Wins; L = Losses; ERA = Earned run average; SO = Strikeouts

| Player | G | IP | W | L | ERA | SO |
|---|---|---|---|---|---|---|
| Jack Stivetts | 54 | 419.1 | 27 | 21 | 3.52 | 289 |
| Toad Ramsey | 44 | 348.2 | 23 | 17 | 3.69 | 257 |
| Billy Hart | 26 | 201.1 | 12 | 8 | 3.67 | 95 |
| Bill Whitrock | 16 | 105.0 | 5 | 6 | 3.51 | 39 |
| Joe Neale | 10 | 69.0 | 5 | 3 | 3.39 | 23 |
| Ice Box Chamberlain | 5 | 35.0 | 3 | 1 | 5.91 | 14 |
| George Nicol | 3 | 17.0 | 2 | 1 | 4.76 | 16 |
