= 1890 Louisville Colonels season =

1890 Louisville Colonels
- 1890 American Association Champions
- League: American Association
- Ballpark: Eclipse Park
- City: Louisville, Kentucky
- Record: 88–44 (.667)
- League place: 1st
- Manager: Jack Chapman

The 1890 Louisville Colonels baseball team finished with an 88–44 record and won the American Association championship. The previous season, the Colonels had lost 111 games, the most any team in the Major Leagues had lost up to that point (the record was broken during the 1890 season by the Pittsburgh Alleghenys, who lost 113 games). When the Colonels won the 1890 pennant, it was the first time in major league history that a team had moved from last place to first place in the span of a single year. This remarkable achievement is extensively documented in a 2026 book, The 1890 Louisville Cyclones, written by Perry T. Cooper and published by McFarland & Company, Publishers.

The Louisville club's sudden ascension from last place to first place was accomplished largely because of the contributions of two young pitchers, Scott Stratton and Red Ehret, with strong support from outfielder Jimmy Wolf (who hit .363 and won the American Association's batting title), shortstop Phil Tomney (an outstanding defensive player) and veteran manager Jack Chapman.

Note that, although the Louisville club is usually listed as the Louisville Colonels in baseball literature, most newspapers in 1890 referred to the club as the Louisville Cyclones. This was prompted by the Tornado outbreak of March 27, 1890. During that multi-state outbreak, a deadly tornado (referred to as a cyclone in 1890 parlance) swept through downtown Louisville, causing widespread devastation and killing between 76 and 120 people (accounts vary). The club's nickname reverted to "Colonels" the following year.

After the season, Louisville played the National League champions, the Brooklyn Bridegrooms, in the 1890 World Series. After seven games, the World Series ended in a tie; each team won three games, with the remaining game being called off on account of darkness with the score deadlocked at seven runs apiece.

== Regular season ==
=== Season standings ===
American Association
Team	W	L	Pct.	GB	Home	Road
Louisville Colonels	88	44	.667	—	57‍–‍13	31‍–‍31
Columbus Solons	79	55	.590	10	47‍–‍22	32‍–‍33
St. Louis Browns	78	58	.574	12	45‍–‍25	33‍–‍33
Toledo Maumees	68	64	.515	20	40‍–‍27	28‍–‍37
Rochester Broncos	63	63	.500	22	40‍–‍22	23‍–‍41
Baltimore Orioles	15	19	.441	24	8‍–‍11	7‍–‍8
Syracuse Stars	55	72	.433	30½	30‍–‍30	25‍–‍42
Philadelphia Athletics	54	78	.409	34	36‍–‍36	18‍–‍42
Brooklyn Gladiators	26	73	.263	45½	15‍–‍22	11‍–‍51

=== Record vs. opponents ===
1890 American Association record Sources:
Team	BAL	BKG	COL	LOU	PHA	RCH	STL	SYR	TOL
Baltimore	—	0–0	2–4–2	1–2–1	2–2	5–1	2–5	1–2	2–3–1
Brooklyn	0–0	—	5–9	2–13	2–10	3–10–1	4–10	5–12	5–9
Columbus	4–2–2	9–5	—	10–8–1	11–9	10–9–1	12–8–2	10–7	13–7
Louisville	2–1–1	13–2	8–10–1	—	17–3	11–6–2	9–11	14–5	14–6
Philadelphia	2–2	10–2	9–11	3–17	—	7–12	7–13	10–7	6–14
Rochester	1–5	10–3–1	9–10–1	6–11–2	12–7	—	8–12–1	11–4–1	6–11–1
St. Louis	5–2	10–4	8–12–2	11–9	13–7	12–8–1	—	10–9	9–7
Syracuse	2–1	12–5	7–10	5–14	7–10	4–11–1	9–10	—	9–11
Toledo	3–2–1	9–5	7–13	6–14	14–6	11–6–1	7–9	11–9	—

=== Roster ===
1890 Louisville Colonels
Roster
Pitchers: Ed Daily; Red Ehret; Herb Goodall; Mike Jones; George Meakim; Scott Stratton; Catchers: Ned Bligh; Jack Ryan; Pete Weckbecker	Infielders: Henry Easterday; Dan O'Connor; Dan Phelan; Harry Raymond; Chief Roseman; Tim Shinnick; Pete Sweeney; Harry Taylor; Phil Tomney	Outfielders: Charlie Hamburg; Farmer Weaver; Jimmy Wolf	Manager: Jack Chapman

== Player stats ==
=== Batting ===
==== Starters by position ====
Note: Pos = Position; G = Games played; AB = At bats; H = Hits; Avg. = Batting average; HR = Home runs; RBI = Runs batted in

Pos	Player	G	AB	H	Avg.	HR	RBI
C	Jack Ryan	93	337	73	.217	0	35
1B	Harry Taylor	134	553	169	.306	0	53
2B	Tim Shinnick	133	493	126	.256	1	82
3B	Harry Raymond	123	521	135	.259	2	51
SS	Phil Tomney	108	386	107	.277	1	58
OF	Charlie Hamburg	133	485	132	.272	3	77
OF	Farmer Weaver	130	557	161	.289	3	67
OF	Jimmy Wolf	134	543	197	.363	4	98

==== Other batters ====
Note: G = Games played; AB = At bats; H = Hits; Avg. = Batting average; HR = Home runs; RBI = Runs batted in

Player	G	AB	H	Avg.	HR	RBI
Pete Weckbecker	32	101	24	.238	0	11
Ned Bligh	24	73	15	.205	1	9
Dan Phelan	8	32	8	.250	0	4
Dan O'Connor	6	26	12	.462	0	5
Henry Easterday	7	24	2	.083	0	1
Chief Roseman	2	8	2	.250	0	0
Pete Sweeney	2	7	1	.143	0	1

=== Pitching ===
==== Starting pitchers ====
Note: G = Games pitched; GS = Games started; IP = Innings pitched; W = Wins; L = Losses; ERA = Earned run average; SO = Strikeouts

Player	G	GS	IP	W	L	SV	ERA	SO
Scott Stratton	50	49	431.0	34	14	0	2.36	207
Red Ehret	43	38	359.0	25	14	2	2.53	174
George Meakim	28	21	192.0	12	7	1	2.91	123
Herb Goodall	18	13	109.0	8	5	4	3.39	46
Ed Daily	12	10	93.0	6	3	0	1.94	31
Mike Jones	3	3	22.0	2	0	0	3.27	6

== 1890 World Series ==
Louisville, champions of the American Association, played the National League champions, the Brooklyn Bridegrooms in the 1890 World Series. The series pitted the two most recent American Association champions against each other.

The series winner was to be the first to win four games. Brooklyn started strong, winning the first two games in Louisville, with game 3 called after eight innings with the score tied. Louisville salvaged the fourth game, which was the last one played in Louisville. After Brooklyn won the first game at home to take a 3–1 lead, Louisville came back to win two straight. After that, bad weather and poor attendance forced the remaining games to be canceled, with the plan that a deciding game would be played before the 1891 season began. However, due to inter-league disputes, that never occurred, and the series officially ended in a 3–3–1 tie.
