= List of Major League Baseball annual putouts leaders =

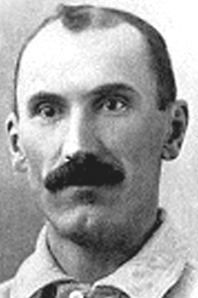
Jake Beckley, the all-time leader in career putouts.

The following is a list of annual leaders in putouts in Major League Baseball (MLB), with separate lists for the American League and the National League. The list also includes several professional leagues and associations that were never part of MLB.

In baseball statistics, a putout (denoted by PO or fly out when appropriate) is given to a defensive player who records an out by a Tagging a runner with the ball when he is not touching a base (a tagout), catching a batted or thrown ball and tagging a base to put out a batter or runner (a Force out), catching a thrown ball and tagging a base to record an out on an appeal play, catching a third strike (a strikeout), catching a batted ball on the fly (a flyout), or being positioned closest to a runner called out for interference.

Jake Beckley is the all-time leader in career putouts with 23,743. Jiggs Donahue holds the record for most putouts in a season with 1,846 in 1907. Frank McCormick, Steve Garvey, Bill Terry, and Ernie Banks have all led the league in putouts 5 times. Freddie Freeman is the active leader in putouts.

== American League ==
| Year | Player | Team(s) | Putouts |
|---|---|---|---|
| 1901 | Frank Isbell | Chicago White Sox | 1,389 |
| 1902 | Candy LaChance | Boston Americans | 1,544 |
| 1903 | Candy LaChance | Boston Americans | 1,471 |
| 1904 | Candy LaChance | Boston Americans | 1,691 |
| 1905 | Jiggs Donahue | Chicago White Sox | 1,645 |
| 1906 | Jiggs Donahue | Chicago White Sox | 1,697 |
| 1907 | Jiggs Donahue | Chicago White Sox | 1,846 |
| 1908 | Tom Jones | St. Louis Browns | 1,616 |
| 1909 | George Stovall | Cleveland Naps | 1,478 |
| 1910 | Jake Stahl | Boston Red Sox | 1,488 |
| 1911 | Hal Chase | New York Yankees | 1,271 |
| 1912 | Stuffy McInnis | Philadelphia Athletics | 1,533 |
| 1913 | Stuffy McInnis | Philadelphia Athletics | 1,504 |
| 1914 | George Burns | Detroit Tigers | 1,579 |
| 1915 | Wally Pipp | New York Yankees | 1,396 |
| 1916 | Chick Gandil | Cleveland Indians | 1,557 |
| 1917 | Stuffy McInnis | Philadelphia Athletics | 1,638 |
| 1918 | George Burns | Philadelphia Athletics | 1,389 |
| 1919 | Wally Pipp | New York Yankees | 1,488 |
| 1920 | Wally Pipp | New York Yankees | 1,649 |
| 1921 | Earl Sheely | Chicago White Sox | 1,637 |
| 1922 | Wally Pipp | New York Yankees | 1,667 |
| 1923 | Earl Sheely | Chicago White Sox | 1,563 |
| 1924 | Joe Hauser | Philadelphia Athletics | 1,513 |
| 1925 | Earl Sheely | Chicago White Sox | 1,565 |
| 1926 | Phil Todt | Boston Red Sox | 1,755 |
| 1927 | Lou Gehrig | New York Yankees | 1,662 |
| 1928 | Lou Gehrig | New York Yankees | 1,488 |
| 1929 | Lu Blue | St. Louis Browns | 1,491 |
| 1930 | Jimmie Foxx | Philadelphia Athletics | 1,362 |
| 1931 | Lu Blue | Chicago White Sox | 1,452 |
| 1932 | Ed Morgan | Cleveland Indians | 1,430 |
| 1933 | Joe Kuhel | Washington Senators | 1,498 |
| 1934 | Hal Trosky | Cleveland Indians | 1,487 |
| 1935 | Hal Trosky | Cleveland Indians | 1,567 |
| 1936 | Zeke Bonura | Chicago White Sox | 1,500 |
| 1937 | Hank Greenberg | Detroit Tigers | 1,477 |
| 1938 | Hank Greenberg | Detroit Tigers | 1,484 |
| 1939 | George McQuinn | St. Louis Browns | 1,377 |
| 1940 | Babe Dahlgren | New York Yankees | 1,488 |
| 1941 | Joe Kuhel | Chicago White Sox | 1,444 |
| 1942 | Les Fleming | Cleveland Indians | 1,503 |
| 1943 | Tony Lupien | Boston Red Sox | 1,487 |
| 1944 | Mickey Rocco | Cleveland Indians | 1,467 |
| 1945 | Rudy York | Detroit Tigers | 1,464 |
| 1946 | Rudy York | Boston Red Sox | 1,327 |
| 1947 | Jake Jones | Chicago White Sox; Boston Red Sox | 1,462 |
| 1948 | Tony Lupien | Chicago White Sox | 1,436 |
| 1949 | Mickey Vernon | Cleveland Indians | 1,438 |
| 1950 | Eddie Robinson | Washington Senators; Chicago White Sox | 1,300 |
| 1951 | Eddie Robinson | Chicago White Sox | 1,296 |
| 1952 | Eddie Robinson | Chicago White Sox | 1,329 |
| 1953 | Mickey Vernon | Washington Senators | 1,376 |
| 1954 | Mickey Vernon | Washington Senators | 1,365 |
| 1955 | Vic Power | Kansas City Athletics | 1,281 |
| 1956 | Vic Wertz | Cleveland Indians | 971 |
| 1957 | Bob Boyd | Baltimore Orioles | 1,073 |
| 1958 | Dick Gernert | Boston Red Sox | 1,101 |
| 1959 | Vic Power | Cleveland Indians | 1,094 |
| 1960 | Bill Skowron | New York Yankees | 1,202 |
| 1961 | Norm Cash | Detroit Tigers | 1,231 |
| 1962 | Norm Siebern | Kansas City Athletics | 1,405 |
| 1963 | Norm Siebern | Kansas City Athletics | 1,223 |
| 1964 | Joe Pepitone | New York Yankees | 1,346 |
| 1965 | Bill Skowron | Chicago White Sox | 1,297 |
| 1966 | George Scott | Boston Red Sox | 1,362 |
| 1967 | George Scott | Boston Red Sox | 1,321 |
| 1968 | Boog Powell | Baltimore Orioles | 1,293 |
| 1969 | Joe Pepitone | New York Yankees | 1,254 |
| 1970 | Jim Spencer | California Angels | 1,212 |
| 1971 | Jim Spencer | California Angels | 1,296 |
| 1972 | John Mayberry | Kansas City Royals | 1,338 |
| 1973 | John Mayberry | Kansas City Royals | 1,457 |
| 1974 | George Scott | Milwaukee Brewers | 1,345 |
| 1975 | Lee May | Baltimore Orioles | 1,312 |
| 1976 | John Mayberry | Kansas City Royals | 1,484 |
| 1977 | Jason Thompson | Detroit Tigers | 1,599 |
| 1978 | Eddie Murray | Baltimore Orioles | 1,507 |
| 1979 | Eddie Murray | Baltimore Orioles | 1,456 |
| 1980 | Mike Hargrove | Cleveland Indians | 1,391 |
| 1981 | Cecil Cooper | Milwaukee Brewers | 987 |
| 1982 | Willie Upshaw | Toronto Blue Jays | 1,438 |
| 1983 | Cecil Cooper | Milwaukee Brewers | 1,452 |
| 1984 | Eddie Murray | Baltimore Orioles | 1,538 |
| 1985 | Steve Balboni | Kansas City Royals | 1,573 |
| 1986 | Don Mattingly | New York Yankees | 1,378 |
| 1987 | Greg Walker | Chicago White Sox | 1,402 |
| 1988 | Wally Joyner | California Angels | 1,369 |
| 1989 | Wally Joyner | California Angels | 1,487 |
| 1990 | Mark McGwire | Oakland Athletics | 1,329 |
| 1991 | Wally Joyner | California Angels | 1,335 |
| 1992 | Frank Thomas | Chicago White Sox | 1,428 |
| 1993 | Rafael Palmeiro | Texas Rangers | 1,388 |
| 1994 | Will Clark | Texas Rangers | 968 |
| 1995 | Mo Vaughn | Boston Red Sox | 1,262 |
| 1996 | Rafael Palmeiro | Baltimore Orioles | 1,383 |
| 1997 | Tony Clark | Detroit Tigers | 1,423 |
| 1998 | Rafael Palmeiro | Baltimore Orioles | 1,435 |
| 1999 | Carlos Delgado | Toronto Blue Jays | 1,306 |
| 2000 | Carlos Delgado | Toronto Blue Jays | 1,416 |
| 2001 | Carlos Delgado | Toronto Blue Jays | 1,518 |
| 2002 | Carlos Delgado | Toronto Blue Jays | 1,232 |
| 2003 | Carlos Delgado | Toronto Blue Jays | 1,355 |
| 2004 | Scott Hatteberg | Oakland Athletics | 1,281 |
| 2005 | Mark Teixeira | Texas Rangers | 1,377 |
| 2006 | Mark Teixeira | Texas Rangers | 1,480 |
| 2007 | Justin Morneau | Minnesota Twins | 1,189 |
| 2008 | Justin Morneau; Lyle Overbay | Minnesota Twins; Toronto Blue Jays | 1,316 |
| 2009 | Kendrys Morales | Los Angeles Angels of Anaheim | 1,274 |
| 2010 | Daric Barton | Oakland Athletics | 1,404 |
| 2011 | Mark Trumbo | Los Angeles Angels of Anaheim | 1,284 |
| 2012 | Prince Fielder | Detroit Tigers | 1,256 |
| 2013 | Chris Davis | Baltimore Orioles | 1,339 |
| 2014 | James Loney | Tampa Bay Rays | 1,111 |
| 2015 | Eric Hosmer | Kansas City Royals | 1,261 |
| 2016 | Chris Davis | Baltimore Orioles | 1,325 |
| 2017 | Justin Smoak | Toronto Blue Jays | 1,244 |
| 2018 | Matt Olson | Oakland Athletics | 1,403 |
| 2019 | Roberto Pérez | Cleveland Indians | 1,082 |
| 2020 | José Abreu | Chicago White Sox | 430 |
| 2021 | Nathaniel Lowe | Texas Rangers | 1,164 |
| 2022 | Nathaniel Lowe | Texas Rangers | 1,252 |
| 2023 | Nathaniel Lowe | Texas Rangers | 1,221 |
| 2024 | Cal Raleigh | Seattle Mariners | 1,138 |
| 2025 | Christian Walker | Houston Astros | 1,100 |
| 2026 | Spencer Torkelson | Detroit Tigers | 1,142 |

== National League ==
| Year | Player | Team(s) | Putouts |
|---|---|---|---|
| 1876 | Herman Dehlman | St. Louis Brown Stockings | 750 |
| 1877 | Joe Start | Brooklyn Hartfords | 704 |
| 1878 | Joe Start | Chicago White Stockings | 719 |
| 1879 | Oscar Walker | Buffalo Bisons | 828 |
| 1880 | Joe Start | Providence Grays | 954 |
| 1881 | Cap Anson | Chicago White Stockings | 894 |
| 1882 | Joe Start | Providence Grays | 905 |
| 1883 | Dan Brouthers | Buffalo Bisons | 1,041 |
| 1884 | Cap Anson | Chicago White Stockings | 1,216 |
| 1885 | Cap Anson | Chicago White Stockings | 1,255 |
| 1886 | Mox McQuery | Kansas City Cowboys | 1,295 |
| 1887 | Roger Connor | New York Giants | 1,325 |
| 1888 | John Morrill | Boston Beaneaters | 1,401 |
| 1889 | Cap Anson | Chicago White Stockings | 1,409 |
| 1890 | John Reilly | Cincinnati Reds | 1,393 |
| 1891 | Jake Virtue | Cleveland Spiders | 1,465 |
| 1892 | Jake Beckley | Pittsburgh Pirates | 1,523 |
| 1893 | Roger Connor | New York Giants | 1,423 |
| 1894 | Jake Beckley | Pittsburgh Pirates | 1,230 |
| 1895 | Jake Beckley | Pittsburgh Pirates | 1,394 |
| 1896 | Patsy Tebeau | Cleveland Spiders | 1,372 |
| 1897 | Perry Werden | Louisville Colonels | 1,335 |
| 1898 | Tommy Tucker | Boston Beaneaters; Washington Senators | 1,552 |
| 1899 | Bill Everitt | Chicago Orphans | 1,491 |
| 1900 | Jake Beckley | Cincinnati Reds | 1,389 |
| 1901 | John Ganzel | New York Giants | 1,421 |
| 1902 | Jake Beckley | Cincinnati Reds | 1,269 |
| 1903 | Jack Doyle | Brooklyn Superbas | 1,418 |
| 1904 | Jake Beckley | St. Louis Cardinals | 1,526 |
| 1905 | Fred Tenney | Boston Beaneaters | 1,557 |
| 1906 | Joe Nealon | Pittsburgh Pirates | 1,592 |
| 1907 | Fred Tenney | Boston Beaneaters | 1,587 |
| 1908 | Fred Tenney | New York Giants | 1,624 |
| 1909 | Ed Konetchy | St. Louis Cardinals | 1,584 |
| 1910 | Ed Konetchy | St. Louis Cardinals | 1,499 |
| 1911 | Ed Konetchy | St. Louis Cardinals | 1,652 |
| 1912 | Fred Luderus | Philadelphia Phillies | 1,421 |
| 1913 | Fred Luderus | Philadelphia Phillies | 1,533 |
| 1914 | Ed Konetchy | Pittsburgh Pirates | 1,576 |
| 1915 | Fritz Mollwitz | Cincinnati Reds | 1,545 |
| 1916 | Ed Konetchy | Boston Braves | 1,626 |
| 1917 | Walter Holke | New York Giants | 1,635 |
| 1918 | Fred Merkle | Chicago Cubs | 1,388 |
| 1919 | Fred Merkle | Chicago Cubs | 1,494 |
| 1920 | George Kelly | New York Giants | 1,759 |
| 1921 | George Kelly | New York Giants | 1,552 |
| 1922 | Jake Daubert | Cincinnati Reds | 1,652 |
| 1923 | George Kelly | New York Giants | 1,568 |
| 1924 | Charlie Grimm | Pittsburgh Pirates | 1,596 |
| 1925 | Jim Bottomley | St. Louis Cardinals | 1,466 |
| 1926 | Wally Pipp | Cincinnati Reds | 1,710 |
| 1927 | Jim Bottomley | St. Louis Cardinals | 1,656 |
| 1928 | Bill Terry | New York Giants | 1,584 |
| 1929 | Bill Terry | New York Giants | 1,575 |
| 1930 | Bill Terry | New York Giants | 1,538 |
| 1931 | Del Bissonette | Brooklyn Robins | 1,460 |
| 1932 | Bill Terry | New York Giants | 1,493 |
| 1933 | Buck Jordan | Boston Braves | 1,513 |
| 1934 | Bill Terry | New York Giants | 1,592 |
| 1935 | Dolph Camilli | Philadelphia Phillies | 1,442 |
| 1936 | Dolph Camilli | Philadelphia Phillies | 1,446 |
| 1937 | Elbie Fletcher | Boston Bees | 1,587 |
| 1938 | Gus Suhr | Pittsburgh Pirates | 1,512 |
| 1939 | Frank McCormick | Cincinnati Reds | 1,518 |
| 1940 | Frank McCormick | Cincinnati Reds | 1,587 |
| 1941 | Frank McCormick | Cincinnati Reds | 1,464 |
| 1942 | Frank McCormick | Cincinnati Reds | 1,403 |
| 1943 | Elbie Fletcher | Pittsburgh Pirates | 1,541 |
| 1944 | Frank McCormick | Cincinnati Reds | 1,508 |
| 1945 | Frank McCormick | Cincinnati Reds | 1,469 |
| 1946 | Elbie Fletcher | Pittsburgh Pirates | 1,356 |
| 1947 | Johnny Mize | New York Giants | 1,381 |
| 1948 | Johnny Mize | New York Giants | 1,359 |
| 1949 | Gil Hodges | Brooklyn Dodgers | 1,336 |
| 1950 | Eddie Waitkus | Philadelphia Phillies | 1,387 |
| 1951 | Ted Kluszewski | Cincinnati Reds | 1,381 |
| 1952 | Whitey Lockman | New York Giants | 1,435 |
| 1953 | Steve Bilko | St. Louis Cardinals | 1,446 |
| 1954 | Gil Hodges | Brooklyn Dodgers | 1,381 |
| 1955 | Ted Kluszewski | Cincinnati Reds | 1,388 |
| 1956 | Bill White | New York Giants | 1,256 |
| 1957 | Gil Hodges | Brooklyn Dodgers | 1,319 |
| 1958 | Orlando Cepeda | San Francisco Giants | 1,322 |
| 1959 | Ed Bouchee | Philadelphia Phillies | 1,127 |
| 1960 | Joe Adcock | Milwaukee Braves | 1,229 |
| 1961 | Joe Adcock | Milwaukee Braves | 1,471 |
| 1962 | Ernie Banks | Chicago Cubs | 1,462 |
| 1963 | Donn Clendenon | Pittsburgh Pirates | 1,450 |
| 1964 | Ernie Banks | Chicago Cubs | 1,565 |
| 1965 | Ernie Banks | Chicago Cubs | 1,682 |
| 1966 | Donn Clendenon | Pittsburgh Pirates | 1,587 |
| 1967 | Ernie Banks | Chicago Cubs | 1,383 |
| 1968 | Donn Clendenon | Pittsburgh Pirates | 1,587 |
| 1969 | Ernie Banks | Chicago Cubs | 1,419 |
| 1970 | Wes Parker | Los Angeles Dodgers | 1,498 |
| 1971 | Nate Colbert | San Diego Padres | 1,372 |
| 1972 | Lee May | Houston Astros | 1,318 |
| 1973 | Tony Pérez | Cincinnati Reds | 1,318 |
| 1974 | Steve Garvey | Los Angeles Dodgers | 1,536 |
| 1975 | Steve Garvey | Los Angeles Dodgers | 1,500 |
| 1976 | Steve Garvey | Los Angeles Dodgers | 1,583 |
| 1977 | Steve Garvey | Los Angeles Dodgers | 1,606 |
| 1978 | Steve Garvey | Los Angeles Dodgers | 1,546 |
| 1979 | Keith Hernandez | St. Louis Cardinals | 1,489 |
| 1980 | Chris Chambliss | Atlanta Braves | 1,626 |
| 1981 | Keith Hernandez | St. Louis Cardinals | 1,056 |
| 1982 | Keith Hernandez | St. Louis Cardinals | 1,591 |
| 1983 | Keith Hernandez | St. Louis Cardinals; New York Mets | 1,418 |
| 1984 | Jason Thompson | Pittsburgh Pirates | 1,337 |
| 1985 | Steve Garvey | San Diego Padres | 1,442 |
| 1986 | Bob Horner | Atlanta Braves | 1,378 |
| 1987 | Andrés Galarraga | Montreal Expos | 1,300 |
| 1988 | Will Clark | San Francisco Giants | 1,492 |
| 1989 | Will Clark; Pedro Guerrero | San Francisco Giants; St. Louis Cardinals | 1,445 |
| 1990 | Will Clark | San Francisco Giants | 1,456 |
| 1991 | Mark Grace | Chicago Cubs | 1,520 |
| 1992 | Mark Grace | Chicago Cubs | 1,580 |
| 1993 | Mark Grace | Chicago Cubs | 1,456 |
| 1994 | Fred McGriff | Atlanta Braves | 1,004 |
| 1995 | Andrés Galarraga | Colorado Rockies | 1,299 |
| 1996 | Andrés Galarraga | Colorado Rockies | 1,528 |
| 1997 | Andrés Galarraga | Colorado Rockies | 1,458 |
| 1998 | Kevin Young | Pittsburgh Pirates | 1,334 |
| 1999 | Kevin Young | Pittsburgh Pirates | 1,413 |
| 2000 | Todd Helton | Colorado Rockies | 1,326 |
| 2001 | Richie Sexson | Milwaukee Brewers | 1,356 |
| 2002 | Todd Helton | Colorado Rockies | 1,357 |
| 2003 | Todd Helton | Colorado Rockies | 1,418 |
| 2004 | Albert Pujols | St. Louis Cardinals | 1,458 |
| 2005 | Albert Pujols | St. Louis Cardinals | 1,597 |
| 2006 | Ryan Howard | Philadelphia Phillies | 1,373 |
| 2007 | Adrián González | San Diego Padres | 1,470 |
| 2008 | Ryan Howard | Philadelphia Phillies | 1,408 |
| 2009 | Albert Pujols | St. Louis Cardinals | 1,473 |
| 2010 | Albert Pujols | St. Louis Cardinals | 1,458 |
| 2011 | Joey Votto | Cincinnati Reds | 1,341 |
| 2012 | Freddie Freeman | Atlanta Braves | 1,295 |
| 2013 | Paul Goldschmidt | Arizona Diamondbacks | 1,494 |
| 2014 | Adrián González | Los Angeles Dodgers | 1,318 |
| 2015 | Paul Goldschmidt | Arizona Diamondbacks | 1,378 |
| 2016 | Paul Goldschmidt | Arizona Diamondbacks | 1,378 |
| 2017 | Wil Myers | San Diego Padres | 1,295 |
| 2018 | Paul Goldschmidt | Arizona Diamondbacks | 1,323 |
| 2019 | Freddie Freeman | Atlanta Braves | 1,296 |
| 2020 | Freddie Freeman | Atlanta Braves | 427 |
| 2021 | Freddie Freeman | Atlanta Braves | 1,248 |
| 2022 | Matt Olson | Atlanta Braves | 1,209 |
| 2023 | Matt Olson | Atlanta Braves | 1,194 |
| 2024 | Matt Olson | Atlanta Braves | 1,259 |
| 2025 | J.T. Realmuto | Philadelphia Phillies | 1,216 |
| 2026 | Michael Busch | Chicago Cubs | 1,218 |

== American Association ==
| Year | Player | Team(s) | Putouts |
|---|---|---|---|
| 1882 | Charles Comiskey | St. Louis Brown Stockings | 861 |
| 1883 | Charles Comiskey | St. Louis Brown Stockings | 1,085 |
| 1884 | Charles Comiskey | St. Louis Brown Stockings | 1,193 |
| 1885 | Bill Phillips | Brooklyn Grays | 1,109 |
| 1886 | Dave Orr | New York Metropolitans | 1,445 |
| 1887 | Tommy Tucker | Baltimore Orioles | 1,346 |
| 1888 | Bill Phillips | Kansas City Cowboys | 1,476 |
| 1889 | Dan Stearns | Kansas City Cowboys | 1,400 |
| 1890 | Mike Lehane | Columbus Solons | 1,430 |
| 1891 | Charles Comiskey; Perry Werden | St. Louis Brown Stockings; Baltimore Orioles | 1,422 |

== National Association ==
| Year | Player | Team(s) | Putouts |
|---|---|---|---|
| 1871 | Charlie Gould | Boston Red Stockings | 345 |
| 1872 | Charlie Gould | Boston Red Stockings | 516 |
| 1873 | Herman Dehlman | Brooklyn Atlantics | 682 |
| 1874 | Jim O'Rourke | Boston Red Stockings | 755 |
| 1875 | Herman Dehlman | St. Louis Brown Stockings | 851 |

== Union Association ==
| Year | Player | Team(s) | Putouts |
|---|---|---|---|
| 1884 | Jumbo Schoeneck | Chicago Browns/Pittsburgh Stogies; Baltimore Monumentals | 1,063 |

== Player's League ==
| Year | Player | Team(s) | Putouts |
|---|---|---|---|
| 1890 | Roger Connor | New York Giants | 1,335 |

== Federal League ==
| Year | Player | Team(s) | Putouts |
|---|---|---|---|
| 1914 | Harry Swacina | Baltimore Terrapins | 1,616 |
| 1915 | Babe Borton | St. Louis Terriers | 1,571 |
