= Detroit Wolverines (minor league baseball) =

Detroit Wolverines (minor league)
- 1889–1891; Detroit, Michigan

Minor league affiliations
- Class: Independent (1889–1891)
- League: International Association (1889–1890); Northwestern League (1891)

Major league affiliations
- Team: None

Minor league titles
- League titles (2): 1889; 1890

Team data
- Name: Detroit Wolverines (1889–1891)
- Ballpark: Recreation Park (1889–1890); Riverside Park (1891)

The Detroit Wolverines were a minor league baseball team based in Detroit, Michigan. From 1889 to 1891, the Wolverines played as minor league baseball, first as members of the Independent level International Association in 1889 and 1890, winning the league championship in both seasons, while hosting home games at Recreation Park. The 1891 Wolverines continued play as members of the Northwestern League, moving home games to Riverside Park.

The minor league Detroit "Wolverines" were immediately preceded by the major league Detroit Wolverines, who played from 1881 to 1888 as members of the National League.

== History ==
The minor league "Detroit Wolverines" were immediately preceded by the Detroit Wolverines of 1881 to 1888, who played as a major league team in the National League. In 1888, the team was managed by Bill Watkins and Bob Leadley. The Detroit franchise was replaced by the Cleveland Spiders in the eight–team 1889 National League. Leadley remained in Detroit to manage the 1889 and 1890 minor league Wolverine teams.

In 1889, the Detroit Wolverines became members of the International Association. Joining Detroit in the eight–team league were the Buffalo Bisons, Hamilton Hams, London Tecumsehs, Rochester Jingoes, Syracuse Stars, Toledo Black Pirates and Toronto Canucks.

In their first season of minor league play, the Wolverines won the 1889 International Association championship. With a regular season record of 72–39, Detroit placed first in the eight–team International Association league standings, playing under manager Bob Leadley. Detroit finished 6.5 games ahead of the second place Syracuse Stars in the final league standings.

After the 1889 Detroit club compiled a their 72–39 record, outfielder Count Campau, called the team "one of the greatest minor league teams gathered" and stated the team "won the flag so easy that fans stopped going out to see the games."

Continuing International Association play in 1890, the Detroit Wolverines won their season opener at Toronto on May 1, 1890. After a parade and ceremonies before the opener, Toronto committed 7 errors in the game, as Detroit won by a score of 10–6.

The 1890 Detroit Wolverines played their final International Association season, winning a second consecutive championship in a shortened season. The league began play reduced to six teams and when the International Association folded on July 10, 1890, the Detroit Wolverines were in first place. The Wolverines had continued play under manager Bob Leadley and had a record of 31–19 when the league folded. The Wolverines finished 1.0 game ahead of the second place Saginaw-Bay City Hyphens (32–20) and 1.5 game ahead of the third place Toronto Canucks (30–20) when the International Association folded. After the league folded, Bob Leadley immediately left the Wolverines to become the manager of the Cleveland Spiders for the remainder of the 1890 season.

In 1891, the Detroit Wolverines continued minor league play in a new league, before folding during the season. The Wolverines began the season as members of the eight–team Northwestern League. The Bay City, Dayton, Evansville Hoosiers, Fort Wayne, Grand Rapids Shamrocks, Peoria Distillers and Terre Haute Hottentots teams joined Detroit in beginning 1891 league play on May 9, 1891. On June 6, 1891, the Wolverines had compiled a 10–19 record playing under player/manager Rasty Wright when the franchise folded.

In 1894, the minor league Detroit Wolverines were succeeded in Detroit by the Detroit Creams of the Western League, who evolved to become today's Detroit Tigers.

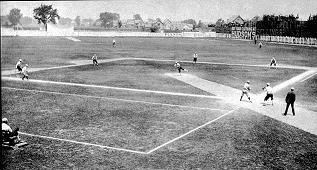
Recreation Park. Detroit, Michigan

== The ballparks ==
The Detroit Wolverines of 1889 and 1890 played minor league home games at Recreation Park. The ballpark had hosted the major league Detroit Wolverines in previous seasons. The ballpark was noted to have had a capacity: 7,500 with field dimensions of (Left, Center, Right): 215–325–215 with a 9–foot fence. The ballpark was reportedly built in 1879 and torn down in 1894 and was reportedly located at Willis, John R, Brady, & Beaubien Streets, Detroit, Michigan. The site today is behind Harper University Hospital, with a historical marker in place identifying Recreation Park.

The 1891 Detroit Wolverines hosted minor league games at Riverside Park. The ballpark was located between Jefferson & the Detroit River, Detroit, Michigan. Today, Riverside Park is still in use as a public park.

== Timeline ==
Year(s)	# Yrs.	Team	Level	League	Ballpark
1889–1890	2	Detroit Wolverines	Independent	International Association	Recreation Park
1891	1	Detroit Wolverines	Independent	Northwestern League	Riverside Park

== Year–by–year records ==
Year	Record	Finish	Manager	Playoffs/Notes
1889	72–39	1st	Bob Leadley	League champions
1890	31–19	1st	Bob Leadley	League folded July 10; League champions
1891	10–19	NA	Rasty Wright	Team folded June 6

== Notable alumni ==
- Varney Anderson (1889)
- Tug Arundel (1889, 1891)
- Jim Banning (1889–1890)
- Count Campau (1889–1890)
- Bill Delaney (1889–1891)
- Jim Donnelly (1889)
- Mike Goodfellow (1889–1890)
- Frank Harris (1889)
- Bill Higgins (1889–1890)
- Frank Knauss (1889–1890)
- Bob Leadley (1889–1890, MGR)
- Tom Lynch (1889, 1891)
- Mac MacArthur (1889)
- John McCarty (1889–1890)
- John McGlone (1889, 1891)
- Mike Morrison (1889, 1891)
- Fred O'Neill (1889–1891)
- John Rainey (1889, 1891)
- George Rooks (1889)
- Lev Shreve (1889)
- Edgar Smith (1889–1890)
- Jake Virtue (1889–1890)
- Jake Wells (1890)
- Bobby Wheelock (1889–1890)
- Rasty Wright (1889–1890), (1891, MGR)
- Henry Yaik (1889)

== See also ==
Detroit Wolverines (minor league) players
