= List of Cleveland Spiders managers =

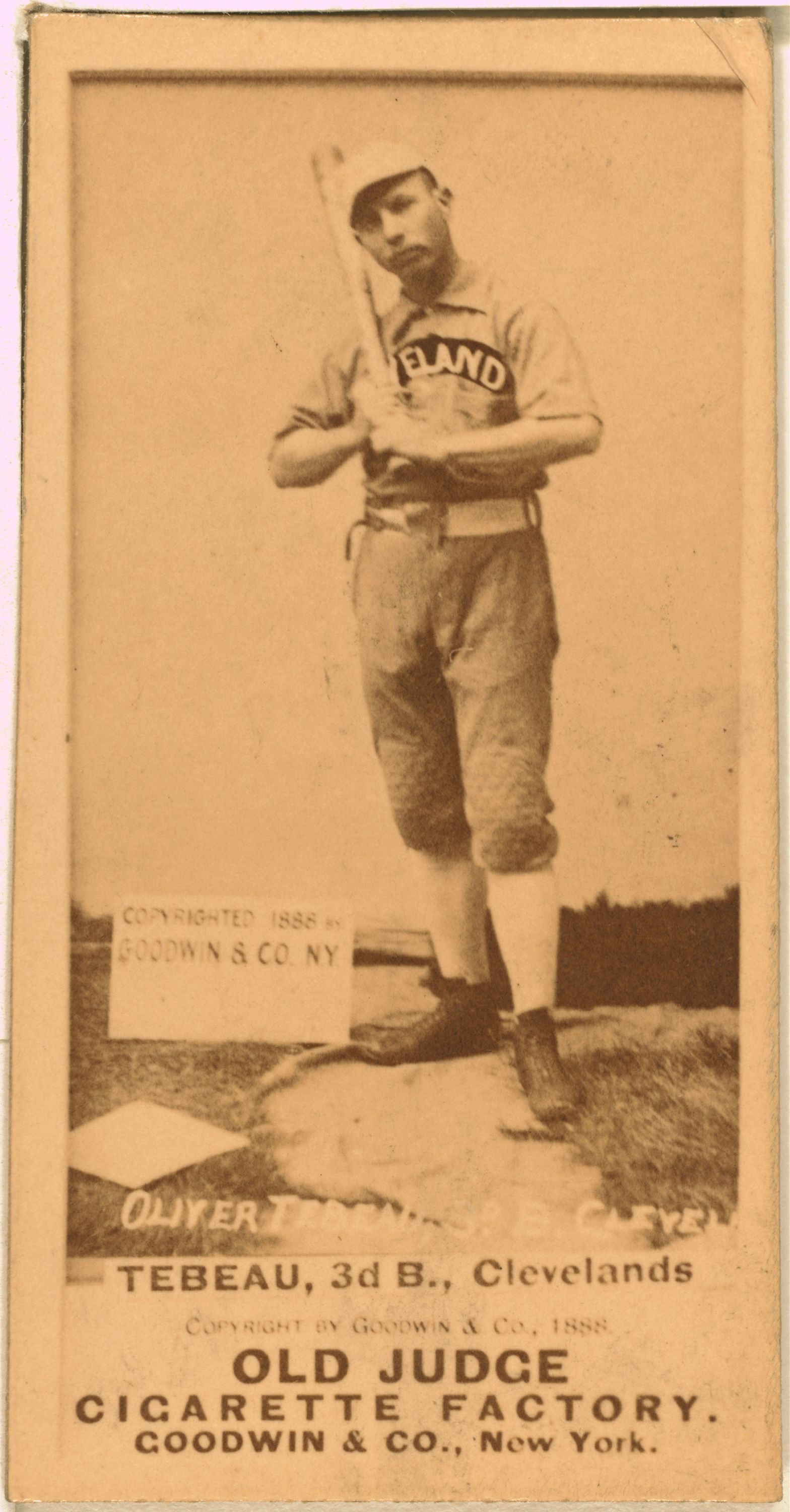
Patsy Tebeau managed the most games in Cleveland Spiders history, and is the only manager with a winning record.

The Cleveland Spiders were a Major League Baseball team that played in Cleveland, Ohio. They played in the American Association when it was considered a major league from 1887 through 1888 and in the National League from 1889 through 1899. From 1887 through 1888 the team was named the Cleveland Blues. During their time as a Major League team, the Spiders employed 7 managers. The duties of the team manager include team strategy and leadership on and off the field.

The Spiders' first manager was Jimmy Williams, who managed the team as the Cleveland Blues in 1887 and the beginning of the 1888 season. Williams managed a total of 197 games for the team, winning just 59 against 136 losses for a winning percentage of .303. This low winning percentage would prove one of the best in team history.

After Tom Loftus, Gus Schmelz and Robert Leadley handled the managerial duties from the middle of the 1888 season through the middle of the 1891 season, first baseman Patsy Tebeau became the Spiders' player-manager 69 games into the 1891 season. Tebeau would manage the Spiders through the end of the 1898 season. Tebeau holds the Spiders' records for most games managed, with 1040, most wins as manager, with 579, most losses as manager, with 436, and highest winning percentage, with .570. Tebeau is in fact the only Spiders' manager to have won more games than he lost. In 1894 and 1895, Tebeau had the distinction of managing his brother George Tebeau, who played outfield and first base for the team.

In 1899, third baseman Lave Cross became the Spiders' player-manager. The Spiders won just 8 of 38 games under Cross, for a winning percentage of just .211, before Cross was replaced as player-manager by second baseman Joe Quinn. The Spiders performed even more poorly under Quinn, winning just 12 games and losing 104, for a winning percentage of .103. The Spiders' 1899 record of 20 wins and 134 losses under Cross and Quinn is the worst in professional baseball history, and the team was dropped from the Major Leagues after the season.

== Table key ==
#	A running total of the number of Spiders managers. Any manager who has two or more separate terms is only counted once.
G	Number of regular season games managed; may not equal sum of wins and losses due to tie games
W	Number of regular season wins in games managed
L	Number of regular season losses in games managed
WPct	Winning percentage: number of wins divided by number of games managed
PA	Playoff appearances: number of years this manager has led the franchise to the playoffs
PW	Playoff wins: number of wins this manager has accrued in the playoffs
PL	Playoff losses: number of losses this manager has accrued in the playoffs
LC	League Championships: number of League Championships, or pennants, achieved by the manager
WS	World Series: number of World Series victories achieved by the manager
†	Elected to the National Baseball Hall of Fame

== Managers ==
#	Image	Manager	Seasons	G	W	L	WPct	PA	PW	PL	LC	WS	Ref
1		Jimmy Williams	1887–1888	197	59	136	.303	—	—	—	—	—	
2		Tom Loftus	1888–1889	207	91	110	.453	—	—	—	—	—	
3		Gus Schmelz	1890	78	21	55	.276	—	—	—	—	—	
4		Robert Leadley	1890–1891	126	57	67	.460	—	—	—	—	—	
5		Patsy Tebeau	1891–1898	1040	579	436	.570	—	—	—	—	—	
6		Lave Cross	1899	38	8	30	.211	—	—	—	—	—	
7		Joe Quinn	1899	116	12	104	.103	—	—	—	—	—	
