= Gettinger =

Gettinger is a surname of German origin. Notable people with the surname include:

- Tim Gettinger (born 1998), American ice hockey player
- Tom Gettinger (1868–1943), American baseball player
