= List of Detroit Wolverines managers =

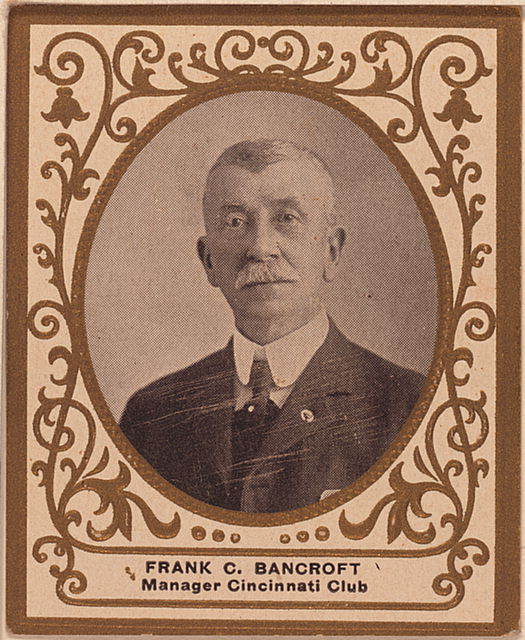
Frank Bancroft was the Detroit Wolverines' first manager.

The Detroit Wolverines were a 19th-century Major League Baseball team that played in Detroit, Michigan. They played in the National League from 1882 through 1888. During their history, the Detroit Wolverines employed five managers. The duties of the team manager include team strategy and leadership on and off the field.

The Wolverines' first manager was Frank Bancroft, who managed the team in 1882 and 1883. Bancroft managed 170 games for the Wolverines, with 83 wins and 84 losses. Bancroft was replaced by Frank Chapman, who managed the team in 1884 and 1885. Chapman managed 215 games for the Wolverines, with 68 wins and 142 losses. Both Bancroft and Chapman would manage teams to the World Series after leaving the Wolverines: Bancroft with the 1884 Providence Grays and Chapman with the 1890 Louisville Colonels. The 19th century World Series was considered an exhibition contest between the champion of the National League and the champion of the American Association.

Charlie Morton began the 1885 season as the Wolverines' manager. Morton managed the Wolverines for 38 games in 1885 before being replaced by Bill Watkins. Morton won just 7 games against 31 losses for a winning percentage of .184, the lowest of any Wolverines' manager. Watkins managed the team from the middle of the 1885 season through the middle of the 1888 season. Watkins managed the Wolverines for 417 games, the most in Wolverines' history. Watkins won 249 games and lost 161, both the most in Wolverines' history. Watkins' .607 winning percentage is the highest of any Wolverines' manager. In 1887, Watkins managed the Wolverines' the National League championship with a record of 79 wins and 45 losses, with 3 ties. Watkins also led the Wolverines to the 1887 World Series championship. The Wolverines defeated the American Association champion St. Louis Browns in the 1887 World Series winning 10 games and losing 5. That was the only World Series championship in Wolverines' history.

Robert Leadley was the last Wolverines' manager. Leadley replaced Watkins midway through the 1888 season, managing 40 games with 19 wins and 19 losses. The Wolverines folded after the 1888 season.

== Table key ==
| # | A running total of the number of Wolverines' managers. Any manager who has two or more separate terms is only counted once. |
| G | Number of regular season games managed; may not equal sum of wins and losses due to tie games |
| W | Number of regular season wins in games managed |
| L | Number of regular season losses in games managed |
| WPct | Winning percentage: number of wins divided by number of games managed |
| PA | Playoff appearances: number of years this manager has led the franchise to the playoffs |
| PW | Playoff wins: number of wins this manager has accrued in the playoffs |
| PL | Playoff losses: number of losses this manager has accrued in the playoffs |
| LC | League Championships: number of League Championships, or pennants, achieved by the manager |
| WS | World Series: number of World Series victories achieved by the manager |
| † | Elected to the National Baseball Hall of Fame |

== Managers ==
| # | Images | Manager | Seasons | G | W | L | WPct | PA | PW | PL | LC | WS | Ref |
|---|---|---|---|---|---|---|---|---|---|---|---|---|---|
| 1 | | Frank Bancroft | 1881–1882 | 170 | 83 | 84 | .497 | — | — | — | — | — | |
| 2 | | Jack Chapman | 1883–1884 | 215 | 68 | 142 | .324 | — | — | — | — | — | |
| 3 | | Charlie Morton | 1885 | 38 | 7 | 31 | .184 | — | — | — | — | — | |
| 4 | | Bill Watkins | 1885–1888 | 417 | 249 | 161 | .607 | 1 | 10 | 5 | 1 | 1^{[a]} | |
| 5 | | Robert Leadley | 1888 | 40 | 19 | 19 | .500 | — | — | — | — | — | |

== Footnotes ==
- ^{a} Although the Wolverines won the tournament called the World Series in 1887, the 19th century World Series was a very different event from the current World Series, which began in 1903. The 19th century World Series was considered an exhibition contest between the champion of the National League and the champion of the American Association. The Wolverines defeated the St. Louis Browns in the 1887 World Series winning 10 games and losing 5.
