= Pat Sullivan (baseball manager) =

American baseball manager

- Manager
- Born: March 24, 1854; Lewisburg, Virginia
- Died: February 26, 1896 (aged 41); Columbus, Ohio
- Batted: Unknown Threw: Unknown

MLB debut
- July 30, 1890, for the Columbus Solons

Last MLB appearance
- August 2, 1890, for the Columbus Solons

MLB statistics
- Games managed: 3
- Win–loss record: 2–1
- Winning %: .667

Teams
- Columbus Solons (1884)

Patrick Joseph Sullivan (March 24, 1854 – February 26, 1896) was professional baseball manager for a period of three games for the Columbus Solons of the American Association. During this period, his team won two games and lost one. He replaced Al Buckenberger, and Gus Schmelz replaced Sullivan, and remained their manager until the team folded following the 1891 season.

Sullivan died in Columbus, Ohio at the age of 41.
