= Count Campau =

American baseball player and manager (1863–1938)

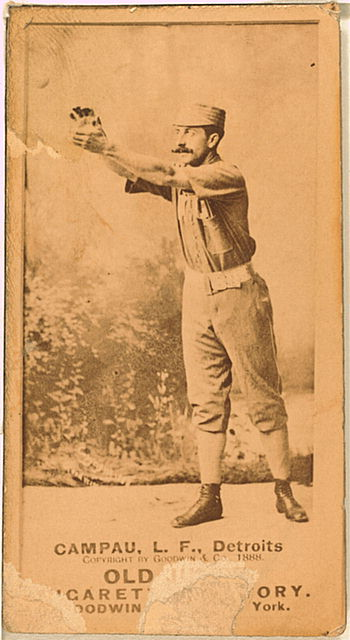
- Outfielder
- Born: October 17, 1863; Detroit, Michigan, U.S.
- Died: April 3, 1938 (aged 74); New Orleans, Louisiana, U.S.
- Batted: Left Threw: Right

MLB debut
- July 7, 1888, for the Detroit Wolverines

Last MLB appearance
- July 17, 1894, for the Washington Senators

MLB statistics
- Batting average: .267
- Home runs: 10
- Runs batted in: 93
- Stats at Baseball Reference

Teams
- As player: Detroit Wolverines (1888); St. Louis Browns (1890); Washington Senators (1894); As manager: St. Louis Browns (1890)

Career highlights and awards
- AA home run leader (1890)

Charles Columbus "Count" Campau (October 17, 1863 – April 3, 1938) was an American professional baseball outfielder. He played in Major League Baseball (MLB) from 1888 through 1894 for the Detroit Wolverines, St. Louis Browns, and Washington Senators. He was the American Association's home run leader in 1890 and was also the Browns' manager for 41 games that season.

Campau was also a player and sometimes a manager in minor league baseball for 19 years, including stints with the New Orleans Pelicans (1887, 1892–94, 1903), Kansas City Blues (1888, 1896, 1898), Detroit Tigers/Detroit Wolverines (1889–90, 1894–95), Seattle Yannigans/Rainmakers (1896), Grand Rapids Bob-o-links (1897), Rochester Bronchos (1899–1900), and Binghamton Bingoes (1901, 1903–05). Although minor league records from the 1880s and 1890s are incomplete, Campau is known to have tallied at least 2,115 hits, 1,305 runs, 597 stolen bases, 157 triples, and 125 home runs in his minor league career.

== Early years ==
Charles Columbus Campau was born in Detroit in 1863. He was a descendant of the prominent Campau family that was among the earliest settlers of Michigan.

Campau was educated at Notre Dame. He stated that he first played baseball while attending Notre Dame in 1875, at which time he would have been 11 years old. After leaving Notre Dame, He helped Detroit's Cass Club team win several Michigan championships.

== Professional baseball career ==
=== Power and speed ===
Campau's success as a baseball player is largely attributed to two talents: power and speed. He is probably most referenced in baseball's record books for having won the American Association's home run championship in 1890. Although minor records from the 1880s and 1890s are incomplete, he hit at least 135 home runs in his professional baseball career, including a high of 20 home runs in 1894. This he accomplished during a deadball era before the home run became a major offensive weapon in baseball. His power was surprising, too, given his slight build at 5 feet, 11 inches, and 160 pounds. In its obituary of Campau, the 1939 Spalding Guide wrote that, despite his slight build, Campau "seemed to get extraordinary power from his wrists and arms".

Although less well reported, Campau also played the game with exceptional speed. While records were not kept for stolen bases during some of his minor league seasons, Campau is known to have stolen at least 660 bases during his career, including 100 stolen bases in 1887. According to at least one account, Campau and two other players held the world record for the fastest time, 14 seconds, in rounding the bases on a baseball diamond. In 1891, Campau began competing for money in foot races against other players and never lost a race. In a race against Tom Messitt, Campau won with a time of 11 seconds.

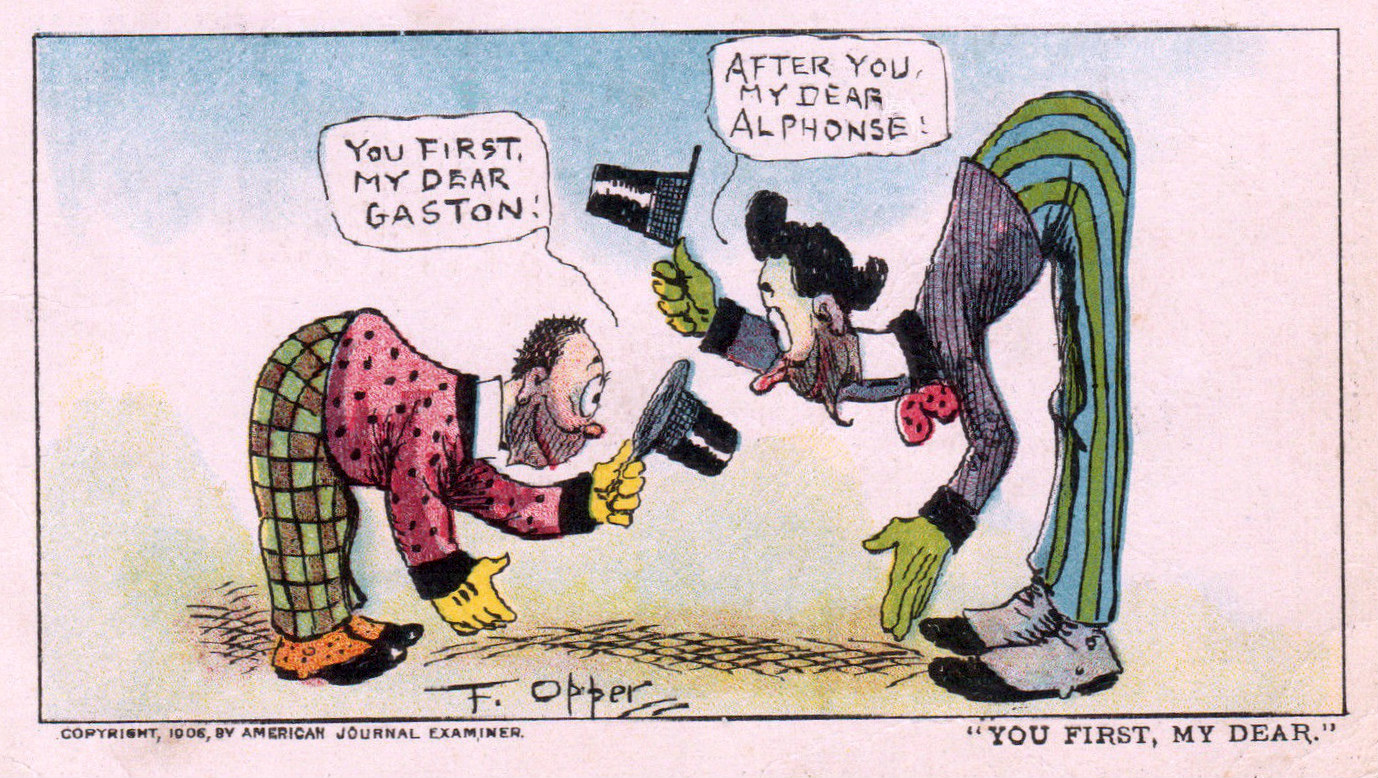
"Alphonse and Gaston"

The best evidence of Campau's speed and base-running intelligence may lie in a 1906 historical account by sportswriter Revere Rodgers. In an article on remarkable incidents in baseball history, Rodgers wrote that Campau once scored a home run on an infield pop-up. According to Rodgers, Campau hit a high pop fly about 10 feet (3.0 m) in front of home plate. The pitcher and catcher converged on the ball, but in what was described by Rodgers as "an Alphonse and Gaston act", no one took control. Campau saw their confusion and rounded first base. The ball fell between them, took a "sudden twist", and rolled into foul territory. Campau kept running and crossed home plate one foot ahead of the player with the ball.

=== Early years in the minors ===
Campau began his professional baseball career with the Erie, Pennsylvania team in the Interstate League. Campau later recalled that he had caught "western fever" and planned to travel west, but he remained in Detroit until Al Buckenberger, a prominent Detroit baseball man, secured a post as the manager in Erie and advised Campau to head east with him. Campau joined Buckenberger in Erie for the 1884 season and helped lead Erie to the Interstate League pennant.

In 1885, Buckenberger was hired as the manager of an independent baseball team in Guelph, Ontario, and Campau followed him there. The following year, Campau played for a team in London, Ontario that won the Canadian championship in 1886.

=== Savannah and New Orleans ===
In 1887, Campau signed with Charlie Morton, who had managed the Detroit Wolverines in 1885 and was in 1887 the manager of the Savannah team in the Southern League. Campau joined Morton in Savannah, but the team disbanded in June 1887. Before the collapse, Campau appeared in 29 games for Savannah and compiled a .379 batting average with five doubles, six triples, three home runs, and 17 stolen bases.

After the Savannah team collapsed, Campau joined the New Orleans Pelicans mid-season. In 84 games with New Orleans in the second half of the 1887 season, Campau compiled a .398 batting average and .626 slugging percentage with 19 doubles, 12 triples, 14 home runs and 83 stolen bases. Combining his season totals from Savannah and New Orleans, Campau stole 100 bases and had 59 extra base hits (17 of them home runs).

With Campau's help, New Orleans won the Southern Association pennant. Campau's best game in New Orleans was on June 7, 1887, when he hit three home runs in one game. He later recalled his favorable treatment by the fans in New Orleans

I will say that my luck commenced from this city. I was kindly treated by the people. I had the pleasant experience of having $90 thrown to me from the grand stand for making three home runs.

=== Detroit Wolverines ===
After his outstanding performance in Savannah and New Orleans, Campau had an opportunity to sign with Philadelphia, but he later recalled that he did not think he was "strong enough" and accepted an offer from Jim Manning, manager of the Kansas City team in the Class A Western Association. Campau appeared in 42 games for Kansas City, compiling a .227 batting average but showed great speed with seven triples and 17 stolen bases.

Kansas City released Campau in June 1888, and he then signed with the Detroit Wolverines, a team that had won the National League pennant in 1887 but had lost its star right fielder, Sam Thompson, to injury. Campau made his major league debut on July 7, 1888, and appeared in 70 games in the outfield for Detroit. Campau proved to be a capable defensive replacement, compiling a .933 fielding percentage (16 points higher that the National League average) and contributing 10 outfield assists and 3 double plays. At the plate, Campau's major league debut was less auspicious as he compiled a .203 batting average. His speed continued to help his cause, as he stole 27 bases and had three triples and a home run. His 27 stolen bases led the team, and he was the recipient of a prize from a local business as the team's leading base-runner. Campau later expressed his gratitude to Detroit first baseman Dan Brouthers who he recalled was "like a father to me" in Campau's first major league season.

At the end of the 1888 season, the Detroit Wolverines left the National League, and most of the players were sold to other clubs. A new Detroit Wolverines team was formed for the 1889 as part of the International League. Campau joined the new Detroit club, appeared in 111 games in left field and stole 69 bases. The 1889 Detroit club was, according to Campau, "one of the greatest minor league teams gathered" and "won the flag so easy that fans stopped going out to see the games."

Campau began the 1890 season in Detroit. He appeared in 39 games, primarily in right field, and compiled a .310 batting average with three home runs.

=== St. Louis Browns ===
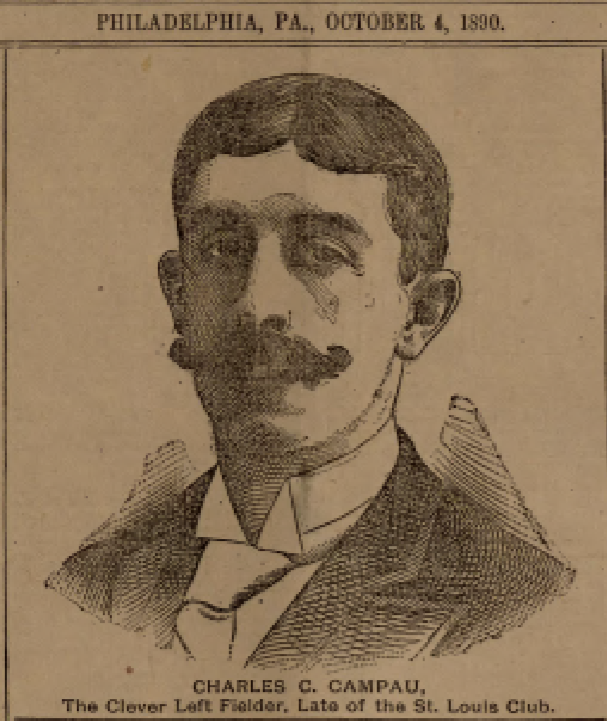
Charles C. Campau on the front page of The Sporting Life, October 4, 1890

After beginning the 1890 season with Detroit, Campau returned to the major leagues with the St. Louis Browns of the American Association. He appeared in 75 games for the Browns, all but one in the outfield. Campau led the league with nine home runs and was among the league leaders with a .513 slugging percentage (2nd), .322 batting average (9th), 12 triples (8th), and 75 RBIs (9th). He also stole 36 bases, contributing to his having the best sabermetric power-speed number in the league. During the month of July, Campau established a major league record (still intact) with 15 consecutive multi-hit games.

In July 1890, Campau was named player-manager. In late July, team owner Chris von der Ahe praised Campau as "the best captain I have ever had", "a general on the field and a gentleman off of it." Camapu compiled a 27-14 record as the team's manager but was stripped of the title in late August. According to an account published at the time in the Sporting Life, Campau took seriously his responsibility to look after the players while they were off the field. He stayed up late, watching over the club, and fined several players heavily for violations of the rules. The fines caused dissent, and ultimately Campau's "resignation was asked for, more to make peace in the family than anything else." At least one baseball writer perceived the unfairness of von der Ahe's removing Campau for enforcing rules established by von der Ahe

There is gratitude for you. Von der Ahe tells his manager to do certain things and because he does it he is humiliated by being removed and a more 'agreeable' man put in his place. I know Charley Campau, and a bigger-hearted or more honorable man never lived.

Shortly after being removed as manager, Campau hit an inside-the-park grand slam against the first-place Louisville Colonels that prompted a tremendous show of support from the St. Louis crowd. When Campau stepped to the plate a fan called out for a home run, and Campau smiled and complied. A fan threw a cigar to Campau, and "then the fun commenced." The crowd of 13,000 showed their appreciation as it "rained cigars steadily for ten minutes. Long ones, short ones, thin ones, thick ones, good ones and bad ones were all mixed up on the grass together." Campau joked that he would pack them away and start a store of his own.

After the season ended, St. Louis team owner von der Ahe released Campau in an attempt to cut costs, leading the Sporting Life to write

The St. Louis Club has released that excellent player, Count Campau, to reduce expenses. Von der Ahe can't reach first place now, and is cutting off his highest salaried men. With Fuller, McCarthy and others missing next year, he'll regret letting such a man as Campau go.

Three weeks later, Campau announced that he had secured a job as a brakeman with the Michigan Central Railroad.

=== Return to the minors ===
Campau returned to the minor leagues in 1891. He spent the season as player/manager of the Troy Trojans in the Eastern Association. In 122 games for Troy, Campau hit .236 with 18 doubles, 10 triples, three home runs and 45 stolen bases. Although he had already shown great speed (100 stolen bases in 1887), Campau wrote that it was while playing at Troy that he "developed as a fast runner", often competing in foot races against other players. Campau recalled that he won all his races and backed himself in bets on the races.

In 1892, he signed with Gus Schmelz to play for the Columbus Reds and won the Western League championship. In 46 games for Columbus, he hit .262 with eight doubles, seven triples, two home runs and 35 RBIs.

In November 1892, Campau entered the fray in the debate over moving the pitcher's box. Campau sided with those advocating moving the pitcher back by five feet. Campau argued that batting averages had suffered and that moving the pitcher back would "electrify" the crowds and "enliven" the game with more hitting. Campau's side prevailed, and the pitcher's box was moved back for the 1893 season.

In 1893, Campau was back in New Orleans with the Pelicans. In 96 games, he hit .337 and scored 98 runs.

In 1894, Campau returned to his hometown of Detroit, this time playing for the Detroit Tigers in the Western League. He also appeared in two games in the major leagues in July 1894 season for the Washington Senators, but spent most of the 1894 season with the Detroit club. He remained in Detroit for two seasons and had one of the best seasons of his career in 1895. That year, he hit .359, scored 115 runs and had 40 doubles, seven triples, 13 home runs and 44 stolen bases.

In 1896, Campau moved to the west coast as the player/manager of the Seattle Yannigans/Rainmakers in the New Pacific League. In 32 games at Seattle, Campau had career highs in batting average (.403) and slugging percentage (.887) with 55 runs, 13 home runs and 19 stolen bases. The league folded before the season ended, and Campau was the league leader in slugging percentage, runs and home runs.

Campau returned in 1897 to the Western League with the Grand Rapids Bob-o-links. He batted .303 in 130 games, scored 109 runs, and had 26 doubles, 10 triples, 12 home runs and 25 stolen bases.

In 1898, Campau was reunited with Gus Schmelz, who was then managing the Minneapolis Millers. He was released by Minneapolis in June and immediately signed with Charles Comiskey, owner of the St. Paul Apostles. He played only two months at St. Paul before he was released and then signed by the Kansas City Blues. Kansas City won the Western League championship that year. Campau's fielding error in the second game of the three-game championship series nearly cost Kansas City the championship. Campau later recalled that the costly error occurred when the sun was directly in his eyes in right field, and he had not even seen the ball until it was past him.

=== Rochester and Binghamton ===
In 1899, Campau was reunited with his first manager, Al Buckenberger. Buckenberger had taken over as manager of the Rochester Bronchos and persuaded Campau to play for him. Campau played the 1899 and 1900 seasons in Rochester, appearing in 243 games, scoring 164 runs and stealing 61 bases.

In 1901, Campau became a player/manager for the Binghamton, New York team in the New York State League. In 1902, he led Binghamton to a disputed pennant. At the end of the season, Binghamton was ahead in a tight pennant race, but the Albany team played and won an extra, unscheduled game and thereupon claimed it had won the pennant. With the exception of 64 games with the New Orleans club in 1903, Campau spent the rest of his career at Binghamton, finally retiring after the 1905 season. His brief excursion to New Orleans in 1903, however, resulted in a lawsuit by the Binghamton team seeking to enjoin him from playing for the Pelicans. He was lured to sign with New Orleans with a promise of part ownership of the club. The Binghamton team alleged that, although there was not a signed contract, it had personal letters from Campau agreeing to manage the team in 1903. In the end, Campau played nine games for New Orleans in 1903 and returned to Binghamton for the 1904 and 1905 seasons.

=== Umpire ===
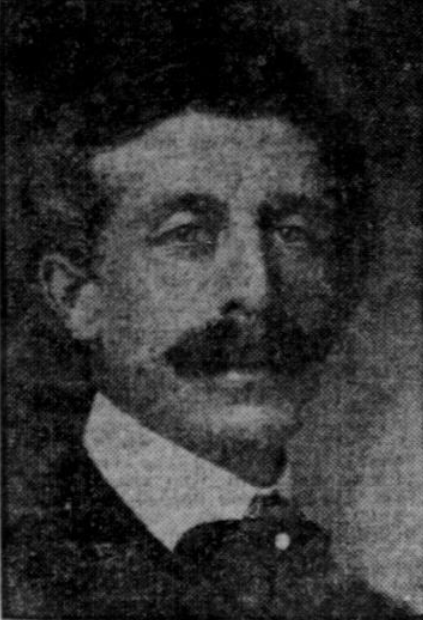
Charley (Count) Campau, c. 1910

In December 1905, after his playing career ended, Campau signed to become an umpire in the Eastern League. He was released by the Eastern League and hired by the Southern League. In August 1906, he was attacked by "an angry army of fans" during a game in Memphis, Tennessee. Three fans were arrested, but then released "when no one appeared to prosecute them". Campau initially announced he would be tendering his resignation shortly after his escape, but reconsidered and reported for his umpiring assignment the next day. It is unknown how many more games Campau umpired, but his umpiring career ended in 1906.

== Later years ==
After his baseball career ended, Campau became involved in the horse racing business. Between 1906 and 1910, he handled the finances of horse racing tracks in Texas, Havana, Seattle, Jacksonville, Florida, and Salt Lake City. He later moved to New Orleans, where he worked as a "clerk of scales and placing judge" at local race tracks. Campau died in New Orleans in 1938 at age 74. He was interred at Metairie Cemetery.

== See also ==
- List of Major League Baseball player-managers

Preceded by Bug Holliday, Harry Stovey	American Association Home Run Champion; 1890	Succeeded by Duke Farrell
