= Robert Leadley =

American baseball executive and manager

Bob Leadley
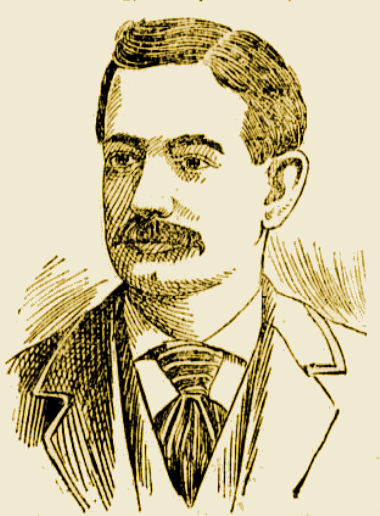
- Manager, owner
- Born: November 11, 1858; Brooklyn, New York, U.S.
- Died: May 19, 1936 (aged 77); Los Angeles, California, U.S.
- Batted: Right Threw: Unknown

MLB statistics
- Managerial record: 76-86

Teams
- As manager: Detroit Wolverines (1888); Cleveland Spiders (1890–91); As owner: Seattle Yannigans/Rainmakers (1896); Grand Rapids Bob-o-links (1897)

Robert H. Leadley (November 11, 1858 – May 19, 1936) was an American professional baseball manager, administrator, and team owner whose career spanned from 1884 to 1897. He was a manager in Major League Baseball for the last portion of the 1888 season with the Detroit Wolverines and for parts of the 1890 and 1891 seasons with the Cleveland Spiders. Over those three seasons, Leadley compiled a record of 76–86 and a winning percentage of .469.

Leadley was also one of the organizers of the New Pacific League, one of the first baseball leagues on the west coast, and co-owner with Bob Glenalvin of the short-lived Seattle Yannigans/Rainmakers in 1896 and the Grand Rapids Bob-o-links in 1897.

In 1899, Leadley was removed from his position as clerk of the Police Court in Detroit after $10,000 was discovered missing. A warrant was issued for Leadley's arrest, but he fled to Mexico City as a fugitive where he lived for at least the next ten years.

== Early years ==
Leadley was born in Brooklyn, New York, in 1858. He moved to Detroit where he worked as an accountant and also managed the Cass Club baseball team in the early 1880s. In December 1881, he was married to Mattie Jane Long in Detroit.

== Professional baseball ==
=== Detroit Wolverines ===
Leadley served as the Secretary of the Detroit Wolverines baseball club from 1884 to 1888 with principal responsibility for handling the club's finances. He was also the head of the Cass Club baseball club in Detroit.

In late August 1888, the Detroit Wolverines fired, or accepted the resignation of, Bill Watkins as their manager; Leadley was hired as "acting manager" in his place. When asked what he was going to do about the team's downward spiral, he replied, "I hardly know. The outlook is not very brilliant, but I shall take hold and do the best I can and trust the rest to fortune." Leadley managed the team for the last 38 games of the season and compiled a 19–19 record.

At the end of the 1888 season, the Detroit Wolverines left the National League, and most of the players were sold to other clubs. A new Detroit Wolverines team was formed for the 1889 as part of the International Association. Leadley served as the Wolverines' manager in 1889 and 1890. The 1889 Detroit club compiled a 72–39 record, and was, according to its star outfielder Count Campau, "one of the greatest minor league teams gathered" and "won the flag so easy that fans stopped going out to see the games." He continued to manage the Detroit team until it disbanded part way through the 1890 season.

=== Cleveland Spiders ===
After the Detroit team disbanded, Leadley was hired as the manager of the Cleveland Spiders. With pitcher Cy Young learning the ropes in his first major league season, the Spiders compiles a 23–33 record under Leadley and finished in seventh place in the National League.

Leadley returned as the Spiders' manager in 1891 and compiled a 34–34 record through the first 68 games. On July 11, 1891, Leadley resigned as manager of the Spiders, and his resignation was accepted. He was replaced as manager by the team's third baseman, Patsy Tebeau.

=== Minor leagues and civil service ===
In August 1891, shortly after being removed as Cleveland's manager, Leadley was hired as manager of the Omaha, Nebraska club in the Western Association. At the time, the Omaha Daily Bee wrote: "In Manager Leadley Omaha has a manager she can feel proud of. He is an educated, cultured gentleman, and ranks high in the estimation of the base ball world."

In April 1892, Leadley was hired as manager of the Buffalo team in the Eastern League. The Sun newspaper from New York wrote at the time: "In Bob Leadley Buffalo has secured a shrewd and able manager." However, a short time after the announcement, Leadley stated that he would not move to Buffalo and would keep his position in Detroit with the United States internal revenue office.

Leadley remained in the civil service in 1893 and 1894. He served as the assistant cashier at the revenue office during those years. In July 1894, he was appointed as the chief clerk of the Police Court in Detroit.

=== Team owner in Seattle and Grand Rapids ===
In 1896, Leadley formed a partnership with Bob Glenalvin, manager of the Detroit Tigers in 1894, and others to re-establish the Pacific Northwest League as the New Pacific League. Leadley became the owner of the Seattle Yannigans/Rainmakers franchise and hired Count Campau, who he had managed in Detroit, as Seattle's player/manager. However, the league folded by the middle of June 1896. After the collapse of the New Pacific League, Leadley returned to Detroit.

In November 1896, Leadley and Glenalvin purchased the Western Association baseball franchise in Grand Rapids, Michigan. The two owned the team, known as the Grand Rapids Bob-o-links, during the 1897 season and hired Count Campau as player-manager with Glenalvin playing at second base. Late in the 1897 season, Leadley bought Glenalvin's interest and became sole owner of the club.

== Embezzlement and fugitive ==
In the late 1890s, even as he was the owner of the Grand Rapids baseball club, Leadley continued to serve as the clerk of Detroit's Police Court. In August 1897, an audit revealed he owed the county the sum of $4,208, admitted he had been neglectful, and promptly paid the sum owed. He continued in his position as clerk despite a call by the Detroit Free Press in September 1897 for his discharge.

In January 1899, Leadley was removed as the Police Court clerk after an investigation revealed a new shortage of approximately $10,000 in his books. When the shortage was discovered, Leadley was reported to be missing, and a warrant was issued for his arrest. By March 1899, Leadley was still in hiding as the city accountant reported that, even as the investigation was nearing its end, additional funds had been embezzled during Leadley's final days in office.

In 1900, Leadley remained on the run and was reported to be living with his wife in Mexico City. In 1907, a report was published that Leadley was tired of living in Mexico City, and his friends offered to pay the city $2,000 in exchange for a grant of immunity. No deal was struck, and friends of Leadley, including Frank Bowerman, continued in their efforts to negotiate a deal on his behalf into 1909. In 1910, he was reported to be living in Torion, Mexico.

== Later years ==
Leadley died in Los Angeles in 1936. According to California death records, he had been living in Los Angeles since 1922 with his wife who was identified as "Matha" Leadley.
