= George Meakim =

American baseball player (1865–1923)

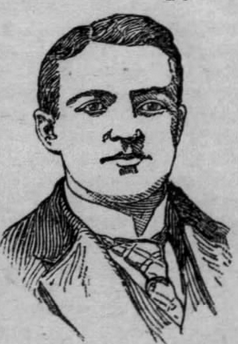
- Pitcher
- Born: July 11, 1865; Brooklyn, New York, U.S.
- Died: February 17, 1923 (aged 57); Queens, New York, U.S.
- Batted: Right Threw: Right

MLB debut
- May 2, 1890, for the Louisville Colonels

Last MLB appearance
- September 3, 1895, for the Louisville Colonels

MLB statistics
- Win–loss record: 15–13
- Earned run average: 4.03
- Strikeouts: 142
- Stats at Baseball Reference

Teams
- Louisville Colonels (1890); Philadelphia Athletics (1891); Chicago Colts (1892); Cincinnati Reds (1892); Louisville Colonels (1895)

George Clinton Meakim (July 15, 1865 – February 17, 1923) was an American Major League Baseball pitcher. He played in the Major Leagues from 1890 to 1895, for the Louisville Colonels, Chicago Colts, Philadelphia Athletics, and Cincinnati Reds. He returned to baseball after a three-year hiatus, retiring after his age twenty-nine season.

Meakim's rookie season in the major leagues in 1890 was a memorable one. He pitched for the Louisville Colonels, who had finished in last place in 1889, but the 1890 Louisville Colonels season was historic, as the Colonels became the first major league team to go from "worst to first." Meakim pitched well for the Colonels in that amazing season, and on 9 July 1890 he came within one out of a no-hitter. But it was on the whole a tumultuous year for Meakim. His manager, Jack Chapman, disliked him so intensely that he frequently refused to let him pitch. Meakim was suspended at one point during the 1890 season for consorting with prostitutes, and he narrowly avoided another suspension when he punched a teammate in the eye during a card game. His involvement in Louisville's 1890 championship season is chronicled in detail in a 2026 book, The 1890 Louisville Cyclones, written by Perry T. Cooper and published by McFarland & Company, Publishers.

After the 1890 season, Meakim had arm problems. He won only three more major league games. After his baseball career he became an inventor, receiving U.S. patent 1,155,258 for a "toe or heel plate" designed for baseball cleats. He died suddenly at age 57; his obituary stated that he died after a short illness, but a relative later revealed that he had committed suicide.
