= John Lyston =

American baseball player (1867–1909)

- Pitcher
- Born: May 28, 1867; Baltimore, Maryland, U.S.
- Died: October 29, 1909 (aged 42); Baltimore, Maryland, U.S.
- Batted: Right Threw: Right

MLB debut
- August 29, 1891, for the Columbus Solons

Last MLB appearance
- June 15, 1894, for the Cleveland Spiders

MLB statistics
- Win–loss record: 0–1
- Earned run average: 10.24
- Strikeouts: 1
- Stats at Baseball Reference

Teams
- Columbus Solons (1891); Cleveland Spiders (1894)

John Michael Lyston (May 28, 1867 – October 29, 1909) was an American professional baseball player who played in one game for the Columbus Solons during the 1891 season and one game for the Cleveland Spiders during the 1894 season. He was born in Baltimore, Maryland, and died there at the age of 42.
