= Mac MacArthur =

Scottish baseball player (1862–1932)

- Pitcher
- Born: January 19, 1862; Glasgow, Scotland
- Died: October 18, 1932 (aged 70); Detroit, Michigan, U.S.
- Batted: Unknown Threw: Right

MLB debut
- May 2, 1884, for the Indianapolis Hoosiers

Last MLB appearance
- June 9, 1884, for the Indianapolis Hoosiers

MLB statistics
- Games pitched: 6
- Win–loss record: 1–5
- Earned run average: 5.02
- Stats at Baseball Reference

Teams
- Indianapolis Hoosiers (1884)

Malcolm M. MacArthur (January 19, 1862 – October 18, 1932) was a Scottish professional baseball player, who played for the Indianapolis Hoosiers of the American Association from May 2, 1884, to June 9, 1884. He was born in Glasgow, Scotland, and is one of only nine individuals in Major League Baseball history to be a Scottish native. MacArthur was a starting pitcher for six games with the Hoosiers, completed each game, and had a win–loss record of 1–5 in 52 innings pitched. In those six starts, he gave up 49 runs, 29 of them were earned, on 57 hits, and had 21 walks, and hit two batsmen. He had his only major league victory, and 8–2 defeat of the Louisville Colonels on May 9 at Eclipse Park in Louisville, Kentucky.

Before his time with the Hoosiers, he had played professionally for the East Saginaw Grays of the Northwestern League in 1883. After his departure from the Hoosiers, he finished the 1884 season the Minneapolis Millers, also of the Northwestern league. He also played minor league baseball with the Syracuse Stars of the New York State League in 1885, the Toledo Avengers of the Western League in 1885, the Hamilton Clippers of the International Association in 1886, the Savannah team of the Southern Association in 1887, the Detroit Wolverines of the International Association in 1889, and the Lansing team of the Michigan State League in 1889.

MacArthur died at the age of 70 in Detroit, Michigan, and is interred at Elmwood Cemetery.
