= Tom Ford (baseball) =

American baseball player (1866–1917)

- Pitcher
- Born: October 1866; Chattanooga, Tennessee, US
- Died: May 27, 1917 (aged 50); Chattanooga, Tennessee, US
- Batted: unknown Threw: unknown

MLB debut
- May 6, 1890, for the Columbus Solons

Last MLB appearance
- May 27, 1890, for the Brooklyn Gladiators

MLB statistics
- Record: 0–6
- ERA: 4.94
- Strikeouts: 12
- Stats at Baseball Reference

Teams
- Columbus Solons (1890); Brooklyn Gladiators (1890)

Thomas Walter Ford (October 1866 – May 27, 1917) was an American Association pitcher. Ford played for Columbus Solons and the Brooklyn Gladiators in the 1890 season. He played in 8 games in his one-year career, having a 0–6 record.

Ford was born and died in Chattanooga, Tennessee.
