= Dan Phelan =

American baseball player (1861–1934)

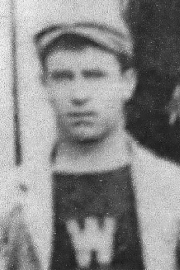
- Phelan with Waterbury, of the Connecticut State League
- First baseman
- Born: November 5, 1861; Waterbury, Connecticut, U.S.
- Died: July 28, 1934 (aged 72); Waterbury, Connecticut, U.S.
- Batted: Left Threw: Unknown

MLB debut
- April 18, 1890, for the Louisville Colonels

Last MLB appearance
- May 11, 1890, for the Louisville Colonels

MLB statistics
- Batting average: .250
- Hits: 8
- RBI: 4
- Stats at Baseball Reference

Teams
- Louisville Colonels (1890)

Daniel Phelan (November 5, 1861 – July 28, 1934) was an American Major League Baseball first baseman who played for the Louisville Colonels of the American Association in 1890.
