= Al Mays =

American baseball player (1865–1905)

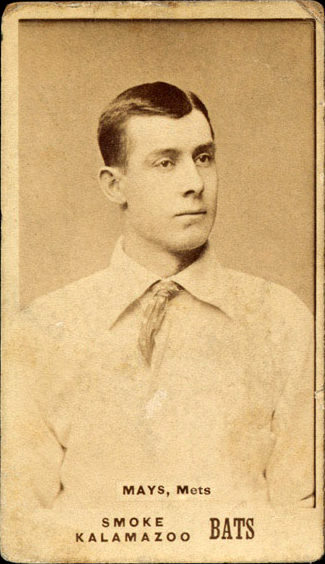
- 1887 baseball card of Mays
- Pitcher
- Born: May 17, 1865; Canal Dover, Ohio, U.S.
- Died: May 7, 1905 (aged 39); Parkersburg, West Virginia, U.S.
- Batted: Right Threw: Right

MLB debut
- May 10, 1885, for the Louisville Colonels

Last MLB appearance
- May 2, 1890, for the Columbus Solons

MLB statistics
- Win–loss record: 53–89
- Earned run average: 3.91
- Strikeouts: 469
- Stats at Baseball Reference

Teams
- Louisville Colonels (1885); New York Metropolitans (1886–1887); Brooklyn Bridegrooms (1888); Columbus Solons (1889–1890)

Albert C. Mays (May 17, 1865 – May 7, 1905) was an American professional baseball pitcher. He played five seasons in Major League Baseball for the Louisville Colonels (1885), New York Metropolitans (1886–1887), Brooklyn Bridegrooms (1888), Columbus Solons (1889–1890), all in the American Association. In 1887, he appeared in a career-high 52 games, threw 50 complete games, and led the American Association that year with 34 losses and 232 earned runs allowed. Mays concluded his pitching career in the minor leagues, including stints with Erie (1891, 1893, 1894), Wilkes-Barre (1892), and Peoria (1892).

Mays was born in 1865 in Canal Dover, Ohio. He died at age 39 in an accidental drowning in 1905 near Blennerhasset Island in the Ohio River.
