= Jerry Kane =

American baseball player (1865–1948)

- First baseman / Catcher
- Born: October 11, 1865; East St. Louis, Illinois, U.S.
- Died: October 27, 1948 (aged 83); East St. Louis, Illinois, U.S.
- Batted: Right Threw: Right

MLB debut
- May 2, 1888, for the St. Louis Browns

Last MLB appearance
- June 25, 1890, for the St. Louis Browns

MLB statistics
- Batting average: .200
- Home runs: 0
- Runs batted in: 2
- Stats at Baseball Reference

Teams
- St. Louis Browns (1890)

Jeremiah Kane (October 11, 1865 – October 25, 1948) was an American professional baseball player. He played from 1888–1890 in Major League Baseball as a first baseman and catcher for the St. Louis Browns in 1890. After his playing career, Kane was a minor league baseball manager for several teams. He went on to have a career in politics in his hometown of East St. Louis, Illinois.

Kane served as chairman for the Illinois State Democratic Committee from 1906 to 1914, after completing two four-year terms as the comptroller for East St. Louis.
