= Mike Jones (1890s pitcher) =

Canadian baseball player (1865–1894)

- Pitcher
- Born: July 6, 1865; Hamilton, Canada West
- Died: March 24, 1894 (aged 28); Hamilton, Ontario
- Batted: Left Threw: Left

MLB debut
- August 1, 1890, for the Louisville Colonels

Last MLB appearance
- August 12, 1890, for the Louisville Colonels

MLB statistics
- Win–loss record: 2-0
- Earned run average: 3.27
- Strikeouts: 6
- Stats at Baseball Reference

Teams
- Louisville Colonels (1890)

Michael Jones (July 5, 1865 – March 24, 1894) was a Canadian Major League Baseball pitcher. He made three starts for the American Association champion Louisville Colonels in 1890, earning the win in two of them. He also had four hits and two walks in his eleven career plate appearances.

== Sources ==
- Career statistics from Baseball Reference · Baseball Reference (Minors) · Retrosheet · Baseball Almanac
