= Frank Meek =

American baseball player (1867–1922)

Dad Meek
- Catcher
- Born: March 14, 1867; Dolní Lukavice, Bohemia, Austria-Hungary
- Died: December 22, 1922 (aged 55); St. Louis, Missouri, U.S.
- Batted: Unknown Threw: Unknown

debut
- May 10, 1889, for the St. Louis Browns

Last appearance
- April 24, 1890, for the St. Louis Browns

Career statistics
- Batting average: .333
- Home runs: 0
- Runs batted in: 1
- Stats at Baseball Reference

Teams
- St. Louis Browns (1889–1890)

Frank James Meek (born Franz James Mik; March 14, 1867 – December 22, 1922) was a Major League Baseball catcher who played in six games for the St. Louis Browns of the American Association in 1889–90.

Meek was previously known in some sources by the nickname "Dad" Meek. Per the Society for American Baseball Research, Frank Meek was not called "Dad" during his lifetime—the confusion arose because another baseball player, Harry Meek, had that nickname and the two were conflated at some point in 1915–1916.
