= Jack Crooks =

American baseball player (1865–1918)

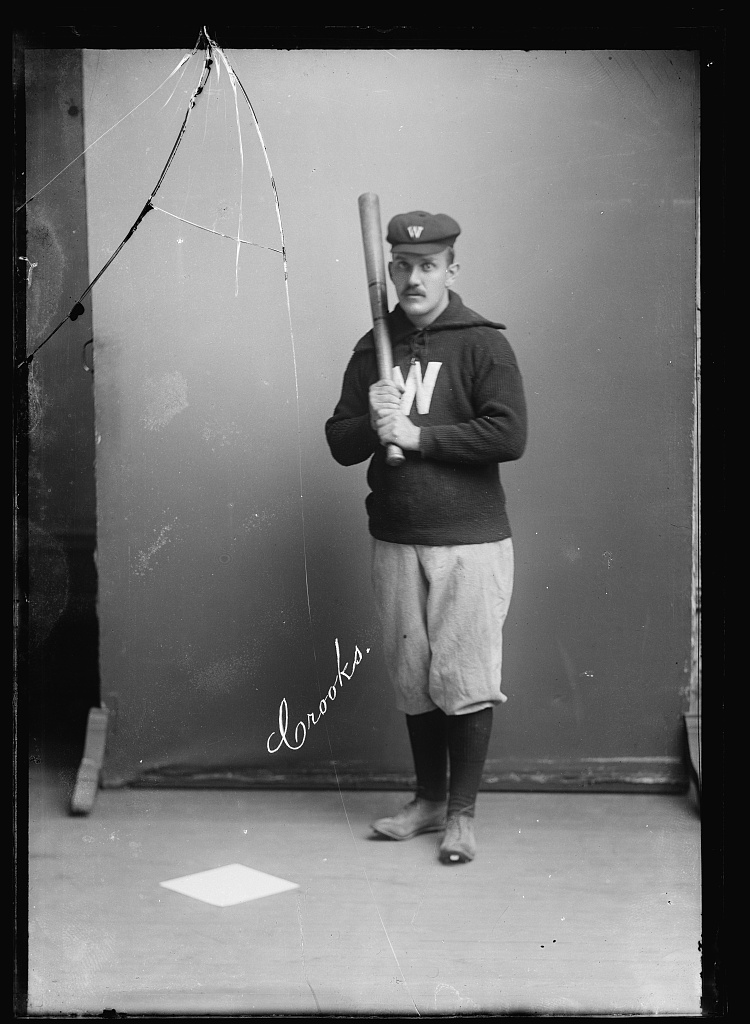
- Jack Crooks photographed by C. M. Bell Studio in 1894
- Second baseman / Manager
- Born: November 9, 1865; Saint Paul, Minnesota, U.S.
- Died: February 2, 1918 (aged 52); St. Louis, Missouri, U.S.
- Batted: Right Threw: Right

MLB debut
- September 26, 1889, for the Columbus Solons

Last MLB appearance
- August 3, 1898, for the St. Louis Browns

MLB statistics
- Batting average: .240
- Home runs: 21
- Runs batted in: 313
- Stats at Baseball Reference

Teams
- As player: Columbus Solons (1889–1891); St. Louis Browns (1892–1893); Washington Senators (1895–1896); Louisville Grays (1896); St. Louis Browns (1898); As manager: St. Louis Browns (1892)

John Charles Crooks (November 9, 1865 – February 2, 1918) was an American Major League Baseball infielder born in St. Paul, Minnesota. He played mainly as a second baseman, but did spend some time playing third base for four teams during his eight seasons ranging from 1889 to 1898. Crooks also amassed a career on-base percentage of .386 despite a Batting average of just .240, due to large part to the high walks totals he compiled.

Crooks was well known in his era as an extremely patient hitter, often fouling off many pitches until he got one that he could hit. This approach led him to draw many walks (also, "bases on balls", or BB), in fact, he held the record for walks by rookie second basemen as well, when he walked 96 times for the Columbus Solons of the American Association in 1890. He held this record until Jim Gilliam of the Brooklyn Dodgers walked 100 times in 1953. Despite hitting just .213 in 1892, he walked a league-leading 136 times put his on-base percentage (OBP) at .400, good for fifth in National League. He also became the Major League single-season record holder in that category, a title he held until Jimmy Sheckard walked 147 times in 1911. That total remained the St Louis Browns/Cardinals single-season franchise record until 1998, when Mark McGwire walked 162 times. The next season, while batting just .237, Crooks' league-leading 121 BB put his OBP at .408. Crooks' career walk rate of 17.6% was the highest among all major leaguers between 1871 and the advent of the live-ball era in 1920.

In addition to playing for Columbus, Crooks also had stints with the Washington Senators, Louisville Colonels, and the St. Louis Browns on two occasions. During his first tenure, he was named as their player-manager, in 1892 on an interim basis twice that season. His short managerial career produced a record of 27 wins and 33 losses, with the team finishing a distant 11th place in the National League standings.

Jack died at the age of 52 in St. Louis, Missouri and was interred at Valhalla Cemetery.

== See also ==
- List of Major League Baseball career stolen bases leaders
- List of Major League Baseball player-managers
- List of St. Louis Cardinals team records
