= Herb Goodall =

American baseball player (1870–1938)

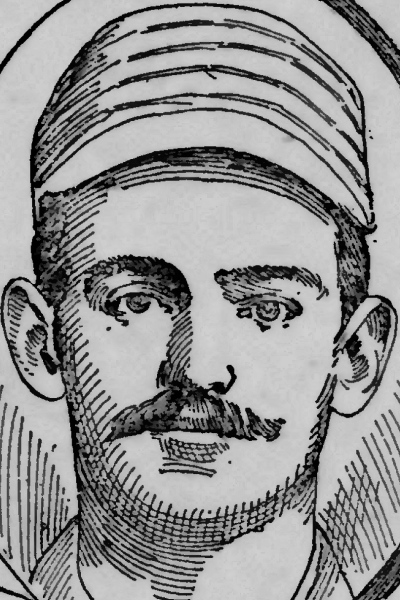
- Pitcher
- Born: August 10, 1870; Mansfield, Pennsylvania, U.S.
- Died: January 20, 1938 (aged 67); Mansfield, Pennsylvania, U.S.
- Batted: Right Threw: Right

MLB debut
- April 29, 1890, for the Louisville Colonels

Last MLB appearance
- October 9, 1890, for the Louisville Colonels

MLB statistics
- Win–loss record: 8–5
- Earned run average: 3.39
- Strikeouts: 46
- Stats at Baseball Reference

Teams
- Louisville Colonels (1890)

Herbert Frank Goodall (March 10, 1870 – January 20, 1938) was an American professional baseball player who played as pitcher in the Major Leagues in 1890. He played for the Louisville Colonels.

== See also ==
- List of Major League Baseball annual saves leaders
