= Jack Easton =

American baseball player (1865–1903)

- Pitcher/Outfielder
- Born: February 28, 1865; Bridgeport, Ohio, U.S.
- Died: November 28, 1903 (aged 38); Steubenville, Ohio, U.S.
- Batted: Unknown Threw: Unknown

MLB debut
- September 2, 1889, for the Columbus Solons

Last MLB appearance
- July 7, 1894, for the Pittsburgh Pirates

MLB statistics
- Win–loss record: 26–29
- Earned run average: 4.12
- Strikeouts: 246
- Stats at Baseball Reference

Teams
- Columbus Solons (1889–1891); St. Louis Browns (1891–1892); Pittsburgh Pirates (1894)

John S. Easton (February 28, 1865 – November 28, 1903) was an American baseball pitcher. He played in Major League Baseball from 1889 to 1894.

Easton was born in Bridgeport, Ohio, in 1865. He began his baseball career in 1887 with a team from Zanesville, Ohio. He then played for teams in Sandusky and Springfield, Ohio.

Easton made his major-league debut with the Columbus Solons in 1889. He had his best season in 1890, appearing in 37 games, throwing 23 complete games, and compiling a 15–14 record with a 3.52 earned run average (ERA). He also played for the St. Louis Browns (1891–1892) and Pittsburgh Pirates (1894). He appeared in 76 major-league games and compiled a 26–29 win–loss record with a 4.12 ERA, 246 strikeouts, and 46 complete games.

He continued pitching in the minor leagues for teams in Chattanooga, Minneapolis, Green Bay, Oil City, and Wheeling. After his career as a baseball player ended, Easton worked as a glassblower. He was arrested for murder in 1897, but he was released within days after it was determined to be a case of mistaken identity. He died from consumption at his home in Steubenville, Ohio.
