= Wild Bill Widner =

American baseball player (1867–1908)

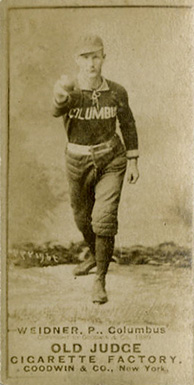
- Pitcher
- Born: June 3, 1867; Cincinnati, Ohio, U.S.
- Died: December 10, 1908 (aged 41); Cincinnati, Ohio, U.S.
- Batted: Right Threw: Right

MLB debut
- June 8, 1887, for the Cincinnati Red Stockings

Last MLB appearance
- July 23, 1891, for the Cincinnati Kelly's Killers

MLB statistics
- Win–loss record: 22-36
- Strikeouts: 110
- Earned run average: 4.36
- Stats at Baseball Reference

Teams
- Cincinnati Red Stockings (1887); Washington Nationals (1888); Columbus Solons (1889–90); Cincinnati Kelly's Killers (1891)

William Waterfield "Wild Bill" Widner (June 3, 1867 – December 10, 1908) was an American professional baseball pitcher. He pitched all or part of five seasons in the majors, from 1887 until 1891, for the Cincinnati Red Stockings, Washington Nationals, Columbus Solons, and Cincinnati Kelly's Killers.

== Sources ==
- Career statistics from Baseball Reference · Baseball Reference (Minors) · Retrosheet · Baseball Almanac
