= Frank Millard (baseball) =

American baseball player (1865–1892)

- Second baseman
- Born: July 4, 1865; East St. Louis, Illinois
- Died: July 4, 1892 (aged 27); Dallas, Texas
- Batted: Unknown Threw: Unknown

MLB debut
- May 4, 1890, for the St. Louis Browns

Last MLB appearance
- May 4, 1890, for the St. Louis Browns

MLB statistics
- Batting average: .000
- Home runs: 0
- Runs batted in: 0
- Stats at Baseball Reference

Teams
- St. Louis Browns (1890)

Frank E. Millard (July 4, 1865 – July 4, 1892) was a Major League Baseball player. He played second base in one game for the St. Louis Brows of the American Association on May 4, 1890. He died two years later, while playing for the Galveston Sand Crabs in the Texas League.

== Sources ==
- Career statistics from Baseball Reference · Baseball Reference (Minors) · Retrosheet · Baseball Almanac
