= Sam Nicholl =

Irish baseball player (1869–1937)

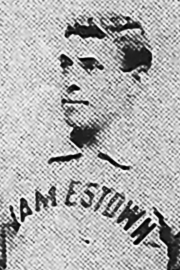
- Outfielder
- Born: April 20, 1869; County Antrim, Ireland
- Died: April 19, 1937 (aged 67); Steubenville, Ohio, U.S.
- Batted: Right Threw: Right

MLB debut
- October 5, 1888, for the Pittsburgh Alleghenys

Last MLB appearance
- May 4, 1890, for the Columbus Solons

MLB statistics
- Batting average: .128
- Hits: 10
- Runs scored: 10
- Stats at Baseball Reference

Teams
- Pittsburgh Alleghenys (1888); Columbus Solons (1890)

Samuel Anderson Nicholl (April 20, 1869 – April 19, 1937) was an Irish-born Major League Baseball player. He played for the Pittsburgh Alleghenys of the National League during the 1888 baseball season and the Columbus Solons of the American Association during the 1890 season.
