= Dan O'Connor (baseball) =

Canadian baseball player (1868–1942)

- First baseman
- Born: August 11, 1868; Guelph, Ontario, Canada
- Died: March 3, 1942 (aged 73); Guelph, Ontario, Canada
- Batted: Left Threw: Right

MLB debut
- June 3, 1890, for the Louisville Colonels

Last MLB appearance
- July 19, 1890, for the Louisville Colonels

MLB statistics
- Batting average: .462
- Hits: 12
- RBI: 5
- Stats at Baseball Reference

Teams
- Louisville Colonels (1890)

Daniel Cornelius O'Connor (August 11, 1868 – March 3, 1942) was a Canadian Major League Baseball first baseman who played for the Louisville Colonels of the American Association in 1890. The 21-year-old rookie stood 6'2" and weighed 185 lbs.

O'Connor played in 6 games for the Colonels, who won the 1890 AA pennant with a record of 88–44. His first appearance was on June 3 and his last on July 19. He hit .462 (12-for-26) with 5 runs batted in and 3 runs scored. At first base he handled 58 chances without an error and participated in 3 double plays.

O'Connor died in his hometown of Guelph, Ontario, Canada at the age of 73.
