= Pat Hartnett (baseball) =

American baseball player (1863–1935)

- First baseman
- Born: October 20, 1863; Boston, Massachusetts, U.S.
- Died: April 10, 1935 (aged 71); Boston, Massachusetts, U.S.
- Batted: Right Threw: Unknown

MLB debut
- April 18, 1890, for the St. Louis Browns

Last MLB appearance
- May 15, 1890, for the St. Louis Browns

MLB statistics
- Batting average: .189
- Runs: 6
- Runs batted in: 4
- Stats at Baseball Reference

Teams
- St. Louis Browns (1890)

Patrick J. Hartnett (October 20, 1863 – April 10, 1935) was an American professional baseball player. Nicknamed "Happy", he played part of one season in Major League Baseball for the St. Louis Browns in 1890.
