= Jim McTamany =

American baseball player (1863–1916)

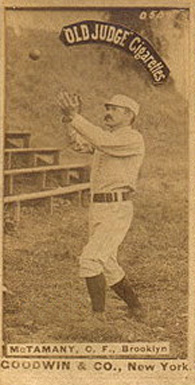
- Outfielder
- Born: July 1, 1863; Philadelphia, Pennsylvania, U.S.
- Died: April 16, 1916 (aged 52); Lenni, Pennsylvania, U.S.
- Batted: Right Threw: Right

MLB debut
- August 15, 1885, for the Brooklyn Grays

Last MLB appearance
- October 5, 1891, for the Philadelphia Athletics

MLB statistics
- Batting average: .256
- Home runs: 19
- Runs batted in: 334
- Stats at Baseball Reference

Teams
- Brooklyn Grays (1885–1887); Kansas City Cowboys (1888); Columbus Solons (1889–1891); Philadelphia Athletics (1891)

Career highlights and awards
- Four seasons with 100+ runs scored

James Edward McTamany (born July 4, 1863 – April 16, 1916) was an American outfielder in Major League Baseball from 1885 to 1891. McTamany played for the Brooklyn Grays, Kansas City Cowboys, Columbus Solons, and the Philadelphia Athletics.

As a hitter, McTamany drew a lot of walks, finishing in the top three of the American Association each year from 1888 to 1891. He led the league with 140 runs scored in 1890.

McTamany was also a good defensive outfielder. He played mostly center field and was among the league leaders in putouts and assists for several seasons.

== See also ==
- List of Major League Baseball career stolen bases leaders
- List of Major League Baseball annual runs scored leaders
- List of Major League Baseball single-game hits leaders
