= John Sneed =

American baseball player (1861–1898)

- Outfielder
- Born: 1861; Shelby County, Tennessee, U.S.
- Died: December 27, 1898; Jackson, Tennessee, U.S.
- Batted: Left

MLB debut
- May 1, 1884, for the Indianapolis Hoosiers

Last MLB appearance
- September 22, 1891, for the Columbus Solons

MLB statistics
- Batting average: .268
- Home runs: 4
- Runs scored: 197
- Stats at Baseball Reference

Teams
- Indianapolis Hoosiers (1884); Toledo Maumees (1890); Columbus Solons (1890–91)

John Law Sneed (1861 in Shelby County, Tennessee – December 27, 1898 in Jackson, Tennessee) was an American Major League Baseball outfielder. He played all or part of three seasons in the major leagues.

Sneed debuted in the major leagues in 1884, appearing in 27 games for the Indianapolis Hoosiers of the American Association.

After playing several years of minor league baseball, Sneed returned to the AA in 1890 with the Toledo Maumees. After just nine games, he was picked up by the Columbus Solons, where he was installed as the team's regular right fielder. Overall, 1890 was Sneed's best season statistically, as he batted .286 with 2 home runs and 69 RBI.

In 1891, Sneed remained the Solons' regular right fielder for most of the season. He played 99 games, but his batting average slipped to .257. The Solons and the AA folded at the end of the season, and Sneed never played in the majors after that.

== Sources ==
- Career statistics from Baseball Reference · Baseball Reference (Minors) · Retrosheet · Baseball Almanac
