= Seattle Yannigans/Rainmakers =

Minor league baseball team (1896)

- (1896); Seattle, Washington

Minor league affiliations
- Previous classes: Class C
- League: New Pacific League

Major league affiliations
- Teams: none

Minor league titles
- League titles: None

Team data
- Ballpark: YMCA Field

The Seattle Yannigans/Rainmakers were a Minor League Baseball team in the New Pacific League. They were based in Seattle, Washington and lasted only one season, folding along with the league in June 1896. League play was greatly affected by spring rain, which led to cancellations and poor revenues for owners. The Portland Gladiators folded first, which led to the league disbanding. Seattle's owners stated they were bringing in east coast players, though the Tacoma Daily Ledger reported Seattle's owners were starting to drop support for their team, as well.

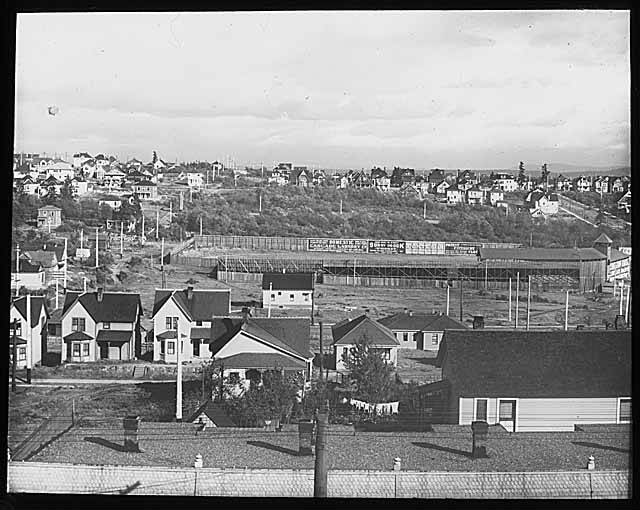
YMCA Field in 1902

Seattle played at YMCA Field, which was improved prior to the start of the season. Sunday games were played at Madison Park. Seattle finished in last place out of four teams.

== Record ==
| Year | League | Affiliation | Record | Finish | Manager | Ref |
|---|---|---|---|---|---|---|
| 1896 | New Pacific League | none | 13–19 | 4th | Count Campau | |

== Notable players ==
- William Brown
- Ike Butler
- Count Campau (player/manager)
