= Charlie Duffee =

American baseball player (1866–1894)

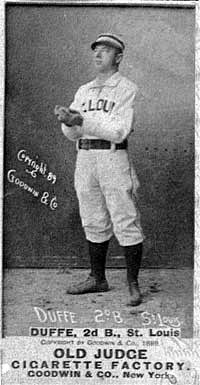
- Outfielder
- Born: January 27, 1866; Mobile, Alabama, U.S.
- Died: December 24, 1894 (aged 28); Mobile, Alabama, U.S.
- Batted: Right Threw: Right

MLB debut
- April 17, 1889, for the St. Louis Browns

Last MLB appearance
- April 30, 1893, for the Cincinnati Reds

MLB statistics
- Batting average: .267
- Home runs: 35
- Runs batted in: 281
- Stats at Baseball Reference

Teams
- St. Louis Browns (1889–1890); Columbus Solons (1891); Washington Senators (1892); Cincinnati Reds (1893)

Charles Edward Duffee (January 27, 1866 – December 24, 1894) was an American Major League Baseball outfielder from 1889–1893, for the St. Louis Browns, Cincinnati Reds, Columbus Solons, and Washington Senators. He left baseball because he was in poor health. He died on Christmas Eve of 1894 at age 28 of "consumption" (tuberculosis).
