= Chief Roseman =

American baseball player (1856–1938)

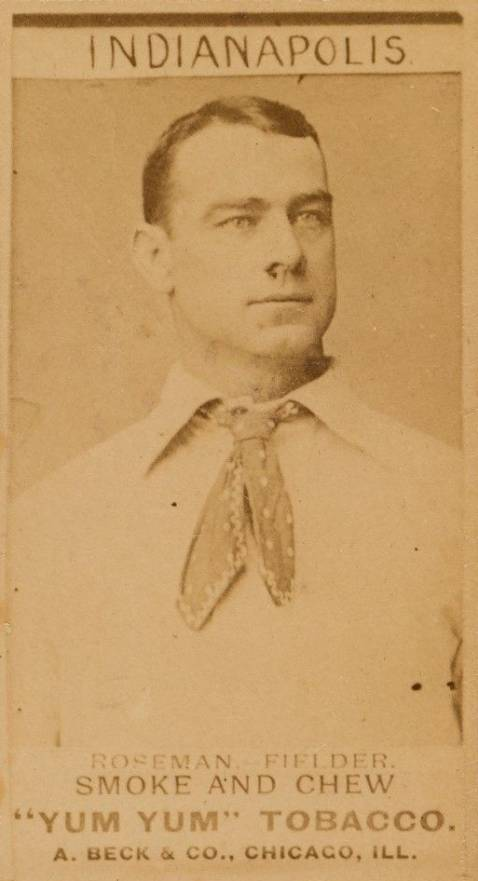
- 1888 baseball card of Roseman
- Outfielder
- Born: July 4, 1856; Brooklyn, New York, U.S.
- Died: July 4, 1938 (aged 82); Brooklyn, New York, U.S.
- Batted: Right Threw: Right

MLB debut
- May 1, 1882, for the Troy Trojans

Last MLB appearance
- August 25, 1890, for the Louisville Colonels

MLB statistics
- Batting average: .263
- Home runs: 17
- Runs batted in: 222
- Stats at Baseball Reference

Teams
- As player: Troy Trojans (1882); New York Metropolitans (1883–1887); Philadelphia Athletics (1887); Brooklyn Grays (1887); St. Louis Browns (1890); Louisville Colonels (1890); As manager: St. Louis Browns (1890)

James John "Chief" Roseman (July 4, 1856 – July 4, 1938) was an American Major League Baseball player from Brooklyn, New York. He played in the outfield for six teams, mainly in American Association, during his seven-season career. In 1890 he was the player-manager over a short period for the St. Louis Browns.

Roseman died on his 82nd birthday in 1938 in Brooklyn, New York, and is interred at St. John Cemetery in Middle Village, New York.

== See also ==
- List of Major League Baseball player-managers
