= Frank Knauss =

American baseball player (born 1868)

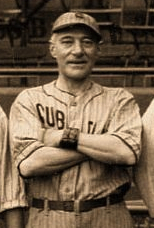
- Knauss at a 1921 Old Timers game at League Park, Cleveland.
- Pitcher
- Born: 1868; Cleveland, Ohio, U.S.
- Died: Unknown
- Batted: Left Threw: Left

MLB debut
- June 25, 1890, for the Columbus Solons

Last MLB appearance
- May 29, 1895, for the New York Giants

MLB statistics
- Win–loss record: 17-16
- Earned run average: 3.30
- Strikeouts: 159
- Stats at Baseball Reference

Teams
- Columbus Solons (1890); Cleveland Spiders (1891); Cincinnati Reds (1892); Cleveland Spiders (1894); New York Giants (1895)

Frank H. Knauss (born 1868) was a 19th-century American Major League Baseball pitcher from 1890 to 1895.
