= John Munyan =

American baseball player (1860-1945)

- Catcher
- Born: November 14, 1860; Chester, Pennsylvania, U.S.
- Died: February 18, 1945 (aged 84); Endicott, New York, U.S.

MLB debut
- July 12, 1887, for the Cleveland Blues

Last MLB appearance
- October 4, 1891, for the St. Louis Browns

MLB statistics
- Batting average: .251
- Home runs: 4
- Runs batted in: 68
- Stats at Baseball Reference

Teams
- Cleveland Blues (1887); Columbus Solons (1890); St. Louis Browns (1890–91)

John B. Munyan (November 14, 1860 – February 18, 1945) was an American Major League Baseball catcher. He played all or part of three seasons in the majors, between 1887 and 1891, for the Cleveland Blues, Columbus Solons, and St. Louis Browns. His career in the minor leagues spanned 12 years, from 1884 until 1895.

== Sources ==
- Career statistics from Baseball Reference · Baseball Reference (Minors) · Retrosheet · Baseball Almanac
