= Mike Lehane =

American baseball player (1865–1903)

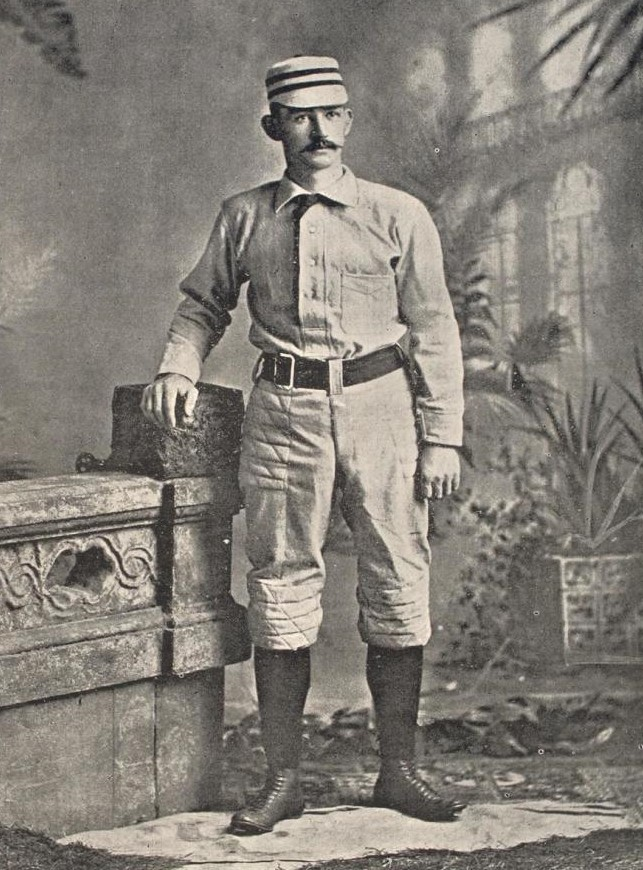
- First baseman
- Born: April 15, 1865; New York City, U.S.
- Died: February 28, 1903 (aged 37); New York City, U.S.
- Batted: Right Threw: Unknown

MLB debut
- April 15, 1890, for the Columbus Solons

Last MLB appearance
- October 4, 1891, for the Columbus Solons

MLB statistics
- Batting average: .213
- Home runs: 1
- Runs batted in: 108
- Stats at Baseball Reference

Teams
- Columbus Solons (1890–1891)

Michael M. Lehane (April 15, 1865 – February 28, 1903) was an American first baseman in Major League Baseball. He played for the Columbus Solons of the American Association during the 1890 and 1891 seasons. Lehane also played in the minor leagues from 1887 to 1896. He died from chronic nephritis.
