= Tom Gettinger =

American baseball player (1868–1943)

- Outfielder
- Born: December 11, 1868; Frederick, Maryland, U.S.
- Died: July 26, 1943 (aged 74); Pensacola, Florida, U.S.
- Batted: Left Threw: Left

MLB debut
- September 21, 1889, for the St. Louis Brown Stockings

Last MLB appearance
- September 25, 1895, for the Louisville Colonels

MLB statistics
- At bats: 503
- RBI: 64
- Home Runs: 6
- Batting average: .260
- Stats at Baseball Reference

Teams
- St. Louis Brown Stockings (1889 – 1890); Louisville Colonels (1895)

Lewis Thomas Leyton Gettinger (December 11, 1868 – July 26, 1943) was an American professional baseball player who played two seasons for the St. Louis Brown Stockings and one season with the Louisville Colonels. He was born in Baltimore, Maryland and died at the age of 74 in Pensacola, Florida.
