= Bobby Wheelock =

American baseball player (1864–1928)

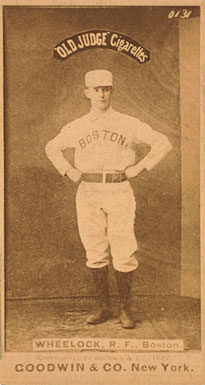
- 1887 baseball card of Wheelock
- Shortstop
- Born: August 6, 1864; Charlestown, Massachusetts, U.S.
- Died: March 13, 1928 (aged 63); Boston, Massachusetts, U.S.
- Batted: Right Threw: Right

MLB debut
- May 19, 1887, for the Boston Beaneaters

Last MLB appearance
- September 27, 1891, for the Columbus Solons

MLB statistics
- Batting average: .235
- Home runs: 3
- Runs batted in: 70
- Stats at Baseball Reference

Teams
- Boston Beaneaters (1887); Columbus Solons (1890–1891)

Warren Henry "Bobby" Wheelock (August 6, 1864 – March 13, 1928) was an American shortstop in Major League Baseball who played for the Boston Beaneaters in 1887 and the Columbus Solons from 1890 to 1891. He was 5 ft 8 in (1.73 m) and weighed 160 pounds (73 kg). He batted right-handed and threw right-handed. His first game was on May 19, 1887, and his final game was on September 27, 1891. Following his Major League postings, Wheelock played the better part of all four seasons of the existence of Grand Rapids' first (of two) Western League franchises from 1894-1897, briefly serving as captain. Wheelock was born on August 6, 1864, in Charlestown, Massachusetts, and died on March 13, 1928, in Boston, Massachusetts.
