= Hank Gastright =

American baseball player (1865–1937)

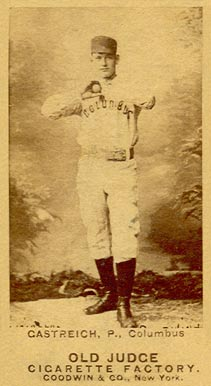
- Pitcher
- Born: March 29, 1865; Covington, Kentucky, U.S.
- Died: October 9, 1937 (aged 72); Cold Spring, Kentucky, U.S.
- Batted: Right Threw: Right

MLB debut
- April 19, 1889, for the Columbus Solons

Last MLB appearance
- June 5, 1896, for the Cincinnati Reds

MLB statistics
- Win–loss record: 72–63
- Earned run average: 4.20
- Strikeouts: 514
- Stats at Baseball Reference

Teams
- Columbus Solons (1889–1891); Washington Senators (1892); Pittsburgh Pirates (1893); Boston Beaneaters (1893); Brooklyn Grooms (1894); Cincinnati Reds (1896)

Henry Carl Gastright (March 29, 1865 – October 9, 1937) was an American 19th-century professional baseball pitcher. He first played Major League Baseball in the American Association, for the Columbus Solons (1889–91), then moved to the National League. He was with the Washington Senators (1892), Pittsburgh Pirates (1893), Boston Beaneaters (1893), Brooklyn Grooms (1894), and Cincinnati Reds (1896). A native of Covington, Kentucky, the right-hander stood 6 ft 2 in (1.88 m) and weighed 190 lbs.

Gastright's best season was 1890 when he won 30, lost 14, and had a 2.94 earned run average for Columbus. His ERA was seventh best in the American Association, his 30 wins were third best, and his four shutouts placed him second. On October 12, he pitched an 8-inning no-hitter against the Toledo Maumees, winning 6–0.

Another notable season for Gastright was 1893, when his combined mark of 15–5 while pitching for Pittsburgh and Boston gave him a winning percentage of .750, best in the National League.

Career totals for 173 games played (171 as a pitcher) include a 72–63 record, 142 games started, 121 complete games, 6 shutouts, 27 games finished, and 2 saves. His lifetime ERA was 4.20. At the plate he was 101-for-544 (.186) with 56 runs batted in and 52 runs scored.

Gastright died at the age of 72 in Cold Spring, Kentucky.
