= Al Buckenberger =

American baseball manager (1861–1917)

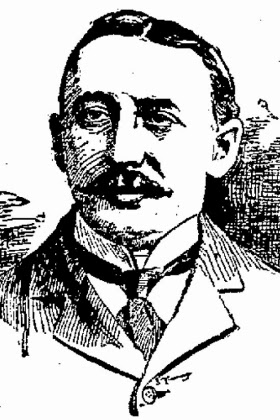
- Manager
- Born: January 31, 1861; Detroit, Michigan, U.S.
- Died: July 1, 1917 (aged 56); Syracuse, New York, U.S.
- Batted: Unknown Threw: Unknown

MLB debut
- April 18, 1889, for the Columbus Solons

Last MLB appearance
- April 8, 1904, for the Boston Beaneaters

MLB statistics
- Games managed: 1,043
- Win–loss record: 488–539–16
- Winning %: .475

Teams
- Columbus Solons (1889–1890); Pittsburgh Pirates (1892–1894); St. Louis Browns (1895); Boston Beaneaters (1902–1904)

Albert C. Buckenberger (January 31, 1861 – July 1, 1917) was an American manager in Major League Baseball.

== Early life ==
Buckenberger was born in Detroit, Michigan, and began his career as an infielder, and then manager for minor league teams in the Midwest.

== Major career ==
In 1889 he became manager of the Columbus Solons of the American Association for two seasons.

After a year at the minor league Sioux City, Iowa based Sioux City Cornhuskers he joined the National League Pittsburgh Pirates from 1892 to 1894, and then the St. Louis Browns for a year. He managed the Toronto Maple Leafs, and the Syracuse Stars of the Eastern League for a year each, taking Syracuse to a first place finish in 1897. He then managed the Eastern League Rochester Bronchos from 1899 to 1901, finishing first-second-first.

Following this he rejoined the National League as manager of the Boston Beaneaters from 1902 to 1904. He returned to Rochester between 1905 and 1908.

Al Buckenberger also served as club president at Pittsburgh. His biggest successes were finishing second in the American Association in 1890 and finishing second in the National League at Pittsburgh in 1893.

== Later life ==
After his major league days he was part of a group, together with Francis Richter, editor of Sporting Life, and fellow manager Billy Barnie that tried and failed to resurrect the American Association.

Buckenberger died at age 56 in Syracuse, New York.

== Managerial record ==
Team	Year	Regular season					Postseason			
Team	Year	Games	Won	Lost	Win %	Finish	Won	Lost	Win %	Result
COL	1889	140	60	78	.435	6th in AA	–	–	–	
COL	1890	80	41	39	.513	Replaced	–	–	–	
COL total		220	99	119	.454		-	-	-	
PIT	1892	29	15	14	.517	6th in NL	–	–	–	–
PIT	1892	66	38	27	.585	4th in NL	–	–	–	–
PIT	1893	131	81	48	.628	2nd in NL	–	–	–	
PIT	1894	110	53	55	.491	7th in NL	–	–	–	
PIT total		336	187	144	.565		-	-	-	
STL	1895	50	16	34	.320	Replaced	–	–	–	
BOS	1902	142	73	64	.533	3rd in NL	–	–	–	
BOS	1903	140	58	80	.420	6th in NL	–	–	–	
BOS	1904	155	55	98	.359	7th in NL	–	–	–	
BOS total		437	186	242	.435		-	-	-	
Total		1,043 (Note: Buckenberger also managed in sixteen games that ended in a tie)	488	539	.475		-	-	-	
