= Ned Bligh =

American baseball player (1864–1892)

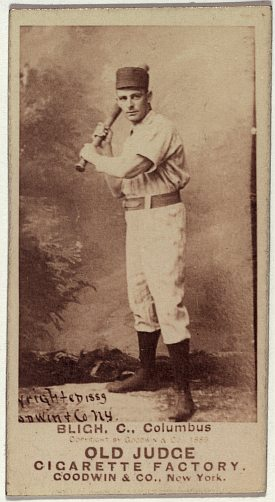
- Catcher
- Born: June 30, 1864; Brooklyn, New York, U.S.
- Died: April 18, 1892 (aged 27); Brooklyn, New York, U.S.
- Batted: Right Threw: Right

MLB debut
- June 26, 1886, for the Baltimore Orioles

Last MLB appearance
- October 14, 1890, for the Louisville Colonels

MLB statistics
- Batting average: .163
- Home runs: 1
- Runs batted in: 19
- Stats at Baseball Reference

Teams
- Baltimore Orioles (1886); Cincinnati Red Stockings (1888); Columbus Solons (1889–1890); Louisville Colonels (1890)

Edwin Forrest Bligh (June 30, 1864 – April 18, 1892) was an American catcher in Major League Baseball player from Brooklyn, New York, who played for four teams during his four-season career. He didn't collect his first base hit until his third season, and fourteenth at bat, when he was purchased by the Columbus Solons from the Cincinnati Red Stockings for $1500 on December 14, 1888. He played in a total of 66 games, collecting 34 hits in 209 at bats for a .163 career batting average.

Ned died of asthenia at the age of 27 in his hometown of Brooklyn, and is interred at Holy Cross Cemetery.
