= Spud Johnson =

American baseball player (1856–1928)

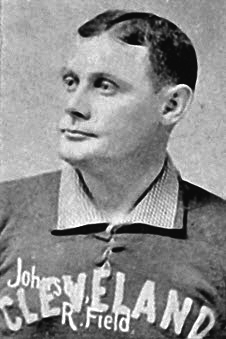
- Outfielder
- Born: December 1856; Canada
- Died: February 1928 (aged 71); Chicago, Illinois, U.S.
- Batted: Left Threw: Left

MLB debut
- April 18, 1889, for the Columbus Solons

Last MLB appearance
- August 8, 1891, for the Cleveland Spiders

MLB statistics
- Batting average: .302
- Home runs: 4
- Runs batted in: 238
- Stats at Baseball Reference

Teams
- Columbus Solons (1889–1890); Cleveland Spiders (1891)

Career highlights and awards
- American Association RBI champion: 1890

James Ralph "Spud" Johnson (December 1856 – February 1928) was a 19th-century Canadian Major League Baseball player for three seasons, two for the Columbus Solons of the American Association and one season for the Cleveland Spiders of the National League. Johnson played mainly in the outfield during his career, but played the third base position in his rookie season of 1889.

== Career ==
Johnson was signed by the Solons on January 15, 1889, when after the 1888 season the Kansas City team of the Western Association folded and was sold to the Kansas City team of the American Association. A dispute quickly surfaced between the two teams about Johnson and his rights. On March 19, Columbus settled the dispute by paying Kansas City $500. His best season came in 1890 when he led the Association in runs batted in with 113, while finishing in the top five in most offensive categories including his .346 batting average, 18 triples, and 186 hits.

In 381 games over three seasons, Johnson posted a .302 batting average (400-for-1,324) with 246 runs, 4 home runs, 238 RBI and 93 stolen bases.

Nothing much is known of his whereabouts after he left organized baseball.

== See also ==
- List of Major League Baseball annual runs batted in leaders
