= Henry Easterday =

American baseball player (1864–1895)

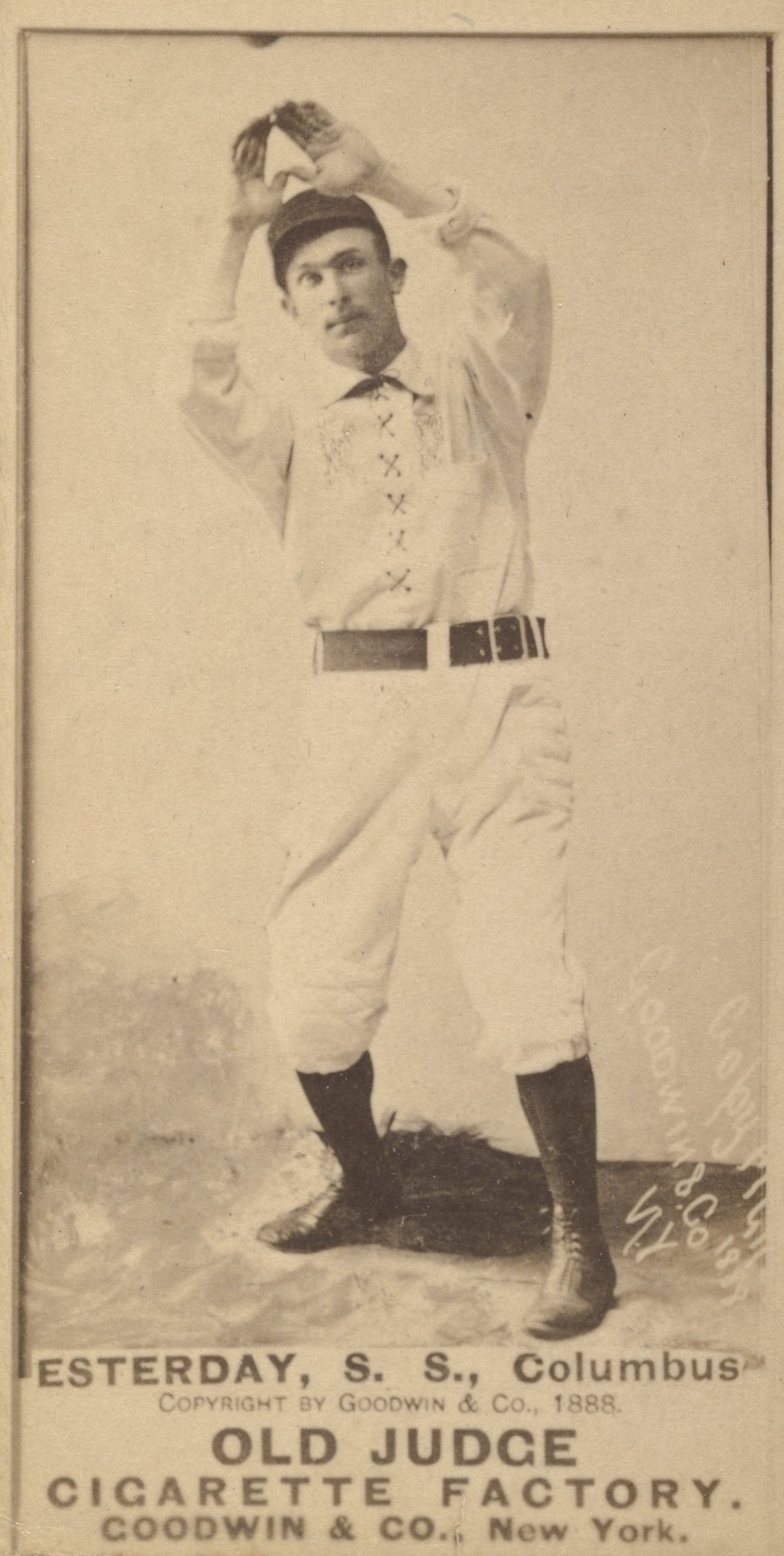
- 1888 baseball card of Easterday
- Shortstop
- Born: September 16, 1864; Philadelphia, Pennsylvania, U.S.
- Died: March 30, 1895 (aged 30); Philadelphia, Pennsylvania, U.S.
- Batted: Right Threw: Right

MLB debut
- June 23, 1884, for the Philadelphia Keystones

Last MLB appearance
- September 21, 1890, for the Louisville Colonels

MLB statistics
- Batting average: .180
- Home runs: 9
- Runs batted in: 92
- Stats at Baseball Reference

Teams
- Philadelphia Keystones (1884); Kansas City Cowboys (1888); Columbus Solons (1889–1890); Philadelphia Athletics (1890); Louisville Colonels (1890)

Henry Propert Easterday (September 16, 1864 – March 30, 1895) was an American professional baseball player. He played all or part of four seasons in Major League Baseball between 1884 and 1890, primarily as a shortstop.

Easterday began his career with the Philadelphia Keystones of the Union Association during the 1884 season. When the league folded he played in the Southern League in 1885, the Eastern League in 1886, and the International Association in 1887 before rejoining the major leagues with the Kansas City Cowboys of the American Association in 1888. He remained in the AA through 1890 with the Columbus Solons, Philadelphia Athletics, and Louisville Colonels. Easterday then played in the minor leagues until he died in 1895.

== Sources ==
- Career statistics from Baseball Reference · Baseball Reference (Minors) · Retrosheet · Baseball Almanac
- Henry Easterday at SABR (Baseball BioProject)
