= Gus Schmelz =

American baseball manager

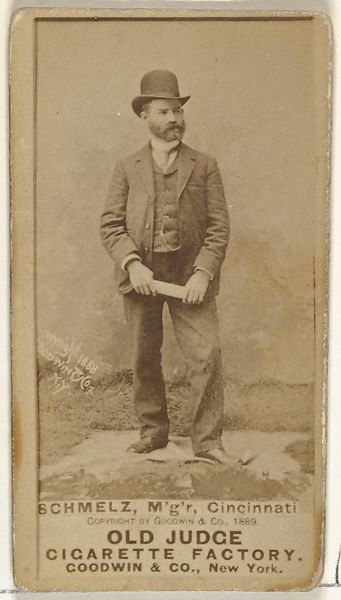
1889 baseball card of Schmelz

Gustavus Heinrich Schmelz (September 26, 1850 – October 14, 1925) was an American manager in Major League Baseball for the Columbus Buckeyes (1884), Cincinnati Red Stockings (1887–89), and Columbus Solons (1890–91) of the American Association. He was also the manager for the St. Louis Maroons (1886), Cleveland Spiders (1890), and Washington Senators (1894–97) of the National League.

According to baseball historian Peter Morris, Schmelz was the first to capitalize on bunting, earning him the nickname "the Father of the Bunt". In 1891, Sporting Life referred to a player's habit of bunting as the "Schmelz system".

He was regarded as a player's manager, but his camaraderie with his players did not translate to pennants, as he never finished higher than second place. His lifetime managerial record was 624–703 (.470).

Schmelz died in his birthplace of Columbus, Ohio at age 75 and is buried at Green Lawn Cemetery.
