= Columbus Solons =

American professional baseball team

Information
- League: American Association (1889–1891)
- Location: Columbus, Ohio
- Ballpark: Recreation Park (1889–1891)
- Founded: 1889
- Folded: 1891
- Ownership: Harry Von der Horst
- Manager: Gus Schmelz (1891); Pat Sullivan (1890); Gus Schmelz (1890); Al Buckenberger (1889–1890)

The Columbus Solons were a professional baseball team in the American Association from 1889 to 1891. In three seasons, they won 200 games and lost 209 for a winning percentage of .489. Their home games were played at Recreation Park in Columbus, Ohio.

The Solons were managed by Al Buckenberger (99–119), Gus Schmelz (99–89), and Pat Sullivan (2–1). Some of their top players were pitchers Mark Baldwin, Ice Box Chamberlain, and Hank Gastright, catcher Jack O'Connor, first baseman Dave Orr, third baseman Lefty Marr, and outfielders Charlie Duffee and Spud Johnson.

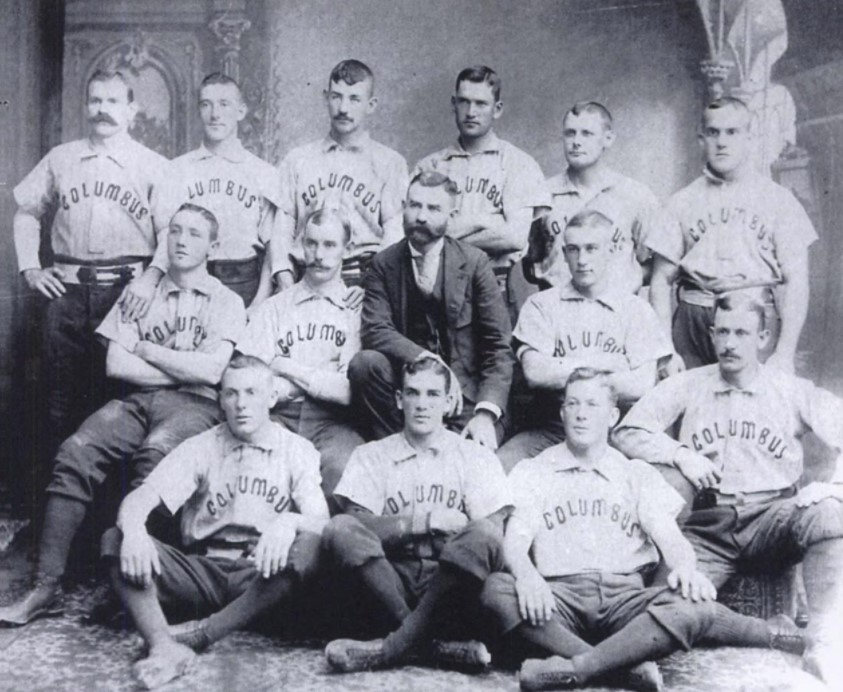
1890 team photo

== See also ==
- 1889 Columbus Solons season
- 1890 Columbus Solons season
- 1891 Columbus Solons season
- Columbus Solons all-time roster
