= 1891 Washington Statesmen season =

1891 Washington Statesmen
- League: American Association
- Ballpark: Boundary Field
- City: Washington D.C.
- Record: 44–91 (.326)
- League place: 9th
- Managers: Sam Trott, Pop Snyder, Dan Shannon, Sandy Griffin

The 1891 Washington Statesmen baseball team finished the season with a 44–91 record in the American Association in their first season. After the season, the AA disbanded and the Washington club, renamed the "Senators," joined the National League.

== Regular season ==
=== Season standings ===
American Association
Team	W	L	Pct.	GB	Home	Road
Boston Reds	93	42	.689	—	51‍–‍17	42‍–‍25
St. Louis Browns	85	51	.625	8½	52‍–‍21	33‍–‍30
Baltimore Orioles	71	64	.526	22	44‍–‍24	27‍–‍40
Philadelphia Athletics	73	66	.525	22	43‍–‍26	30‍–‍40
Milwaukee Brewers	21	15	.583	22½	16‍–‍5	5‍–‍10
Cincinnati Kelly's Killers	43	57	.430	32½	24‍–‍21	19‍–‍36
Columbus Solons	61	76	.445	33	33‍–‍29	28‍–‍47
Louisville Colonels	54	83	.394	40	39‍–‍32	15‍–‍51
Washington Statesmen	44	91	.326	49	28‍–‍40	16‍–‍51

=== Record vs. opponents ===
1891 American Association record Sources:
Team	BAL	BSR	CKE	COL	LOU	MIL	PHA	STL	WAS
Baltimore	—	8–12–1	7–5	12–7	14–6	3–3	9–10–2	7–12–1	11–9
Boston	12–8–1	—	8–5	15–5	14–3–2	5–2	13–7–1	8–10	18–2
Cincinnati	5–7	5–8	—	8–7	7–9	0–0	4–8	5–14–1	9–4–1
Columbus	7–12	5–15	7–8	—	12–8	0–5	9–11	9–11	12–6–1
Louisville	6–14	3–14–2	9–7	8–12	—	1–3	8–12	9–11	10–10
Milwaukee	3–3	2–5	0–0	5–0	3–1	—	3–5	1–0	4–1
Philadelphia	10–9–2	7–13–1	8–4	11–9	12–8	5–3	—	10–10	10–10–1
St. Louis	12–7–1	10–8	14–5–1	11–9	11–9	0–1	10–10	—	17–2–1
Washington	9–11	2–18	4–9–1	6–12–1	10–10	1–4	10–10–1	2–17–1	—

=== Roster ===
1891 Washington Statesmen
Roster
Pitchers: Jersey Bakely; Kid Carsey; Ed Cassian; Martin Duke; Ed Eiteljorge; Frank Foreman; Buck Freeman; George Keefe; Harry Mace; Bob Miller; Bill Quarles	Catchers: Tom Hart; Pete Lohman; Deacon McGuire; Miah Murray; Infielders: Billy Alvord; Jumbo Davis; Tommy Dowd; Fred Dunlap; Gil Hatfield; Al McCauley; Tom McLaughlin; Mox McQuery; Dan Shannon; Will Smalley; Pop Smith; Pop Snyder	Outfielders: Ed Beecher; Jim Burns; Jim Curtiss; Ed Daily; Patsy Donovan; Sandy Griffin; Paul Hines; Larry Murphy; Mike Slattery; Sy Sutcliffe; Joe Visner	Manager: Sandy Griffin; Dan Shannon; Pop Snyder; Sam Trott

== Player stats ==
=== Batting ===
==== Starters by position ====
Note: Pos = Position; G = Games played; AB = At bats; H = Hits; Avg. = Batting average; HR = Home runs; RBI = Runs batted in

Pos	Player	G	AB	H	Avg.	HR	RBI
C	Deacon McGuire	114	413	125	.303	3	66
1B	Mox McQuery	68	261	63	.241	2	37
2B	Tommy Dowd	112	464	120	.259	1	44
SS	Gil Hatfield	134	500	128	.256	1	48
3B	Billy Alvord	81	312	73	.234	0	30
OF	Paul Hines	54	206	58	.282	0	31
OF	Ed Beecher	58	235	57	.243	2	28
OF	Larry Murphy	101	400	106	.265	1	35

==== Other batters ====
Note: G = Games played; AB = At bats; H = Hits; Avg. = Batting average; HR = Home runs; RBI = Runs batted in

Player	G	AB	H	Avg.	HR	RBI
Al McCauley	59	206	58	.282	1	31
Sy Sutcliffe	53	201	71	.353	2	33
Pete Lohman	32	109	21	.193	1	11
Jim Curtiss	29	103	26	.252	0	12
Pop Smith	27	90	16	.178	0	13
Jim Burns	20	82	26	.317	0	10
Ed Daily	21	79	18	.228	0	6
Patsy Donovan	17	70	14	.200	0	3
Sandy Griffin	20	69	19	.275	0	10
Joe Visner	18	68	19	.279	1	7
Dan Shannon	19	67	9	.134	0	3
Mike Slattery	15	60	17	.283	0	5
Jumbo Davis	12	44	14	.318	0	9
Tom McLaughlin	14	41	11	.268	0	3
Will Smalley	11	38	6	.158	0	3
Pop Snyder	8	27	5	.185	0	2
Fred Dunlap	8	25	5	.200	0	4
Tom Hart	8	24	3	.125	0	2
Miah Murray	2	8	0	.000	0	0

=== Pitching ===
==== Starting pitchers ====
Note: G = Games pitched; IP = Innings pitched; W = Wins; L = Losses; ERA = Earned run average; SO = Strikeouts

Player	G	IP	W	L	ERA	SO
Kid Carsey	54	413.0	14	37	4.99	174
Frank Foreman	43	345.1	18	20	3.73	170
Jersey Bakely	13	104.1	2	10	5.35	32
Ed Eiteljorge	8	61.1	1	5	6.16	23
Ed Cassian	7	53.0	2	4	5.60	14
Buck Freeman	5	44.0	3	2	3.89	28
Bob Miller	7	42.0	2	5	4.29	13
George Keefe	5	37.0	0	3	2.68	11
Martin Duke	4	23.0	0	3	7.43	5

==== Other pitchers ====
Note: G = Games pitched; IP = Innings pitched; W = Wins; L = Losses; ERA = Earned run average; SO = Strikeouts

Player	G	IP	W	L	ERA	SO
Bill Quarles	3	22.0	1	1	8.18	10
Harry Mace	3	16.0	0	1	7.31	3

==== Relief pitchers ====
Note: G = Games pitched; W = Wins; L = Losses; SV = Saves; ERA = Earned run average; SO = Strikeouts

Player	G	W	L	SV	ERA	SO
Gil Hatfield	4	0	0	0	11.00	3
