= Philadelphia Athletics (1890–1891) all-time roster =

List of baseball players

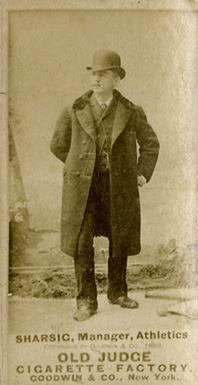
1891 Athletics manager Bill Sharsig

The Philadelphia Athletics were a professional baseball team that existed for two seasons from 1890 to 1891. Known alternatively as the Philadelphia Quakers, and sometimes informally as "Buffinton's Beauties", they played their first season in the newly created Players' League (PL) of 1890, and were managed by Jim Fogarty and Charlie Buffinton. After the demise of the PL following the 1890 season, the team joined the American Association (AA) for the 1891 season, and were managed by Bill Sharsig and George Wood. For each season, the franchise used Forepaugh Park as their home field.

Despite the existence of established major league representation in Philadelphia, the Phillies of the National League (NL) and the Athletics of the AA, the new PL franchise was able to sign veteran players, including Buffinton, Billy Shindle, George Wood, and Ben Sanders. The Quakers finished the season with a 68–63 win–loss record, with one tie, placing them fifth among the eight PL teams.

Following the 1890 season, many players returned to their previous teams; however, the Athletics were able to sign quality veteran players, including Gus Weyhing, Elton Chamberlain, and Pop Corkhill. The team completed the season with a 73–66 win–loss record, with four ties, placing them fifth among nine teams. Following the 1891 season, the AA could no longer operate because of great financial losses, and was forced to fold; four of its teams became part of the NL, and the others, including the Athletics, accepted buyouts. George Wood led the franchise in many batting categories, including; batting average with .299, at bats with 1067, hits with 319, and runs scored with 220. Jocko Milligan's 44 doubles and 14 home runs led the franchise, while Weyhing's 31 wins in 1891 is tops among the pitching leaders, as well as his 3.18 earned run average.

== Keys ==
Abbreviations
| Name | Name of the player by official records |
| Position | Position that player played in the field |
| Seasons | The seasons played for this franchise by the player |
| § | Player was a player-manager |

Position
| C | Catcher | 1B | First baseman |
| 2B | Second baseman | 3B | Third baseman |
| SS | Shortstop | LF | Left fielder |
| CF | Center fielder | RF | Right fielder |
| OF | Outfielder | SP | Starting pitcher |

== Players ==
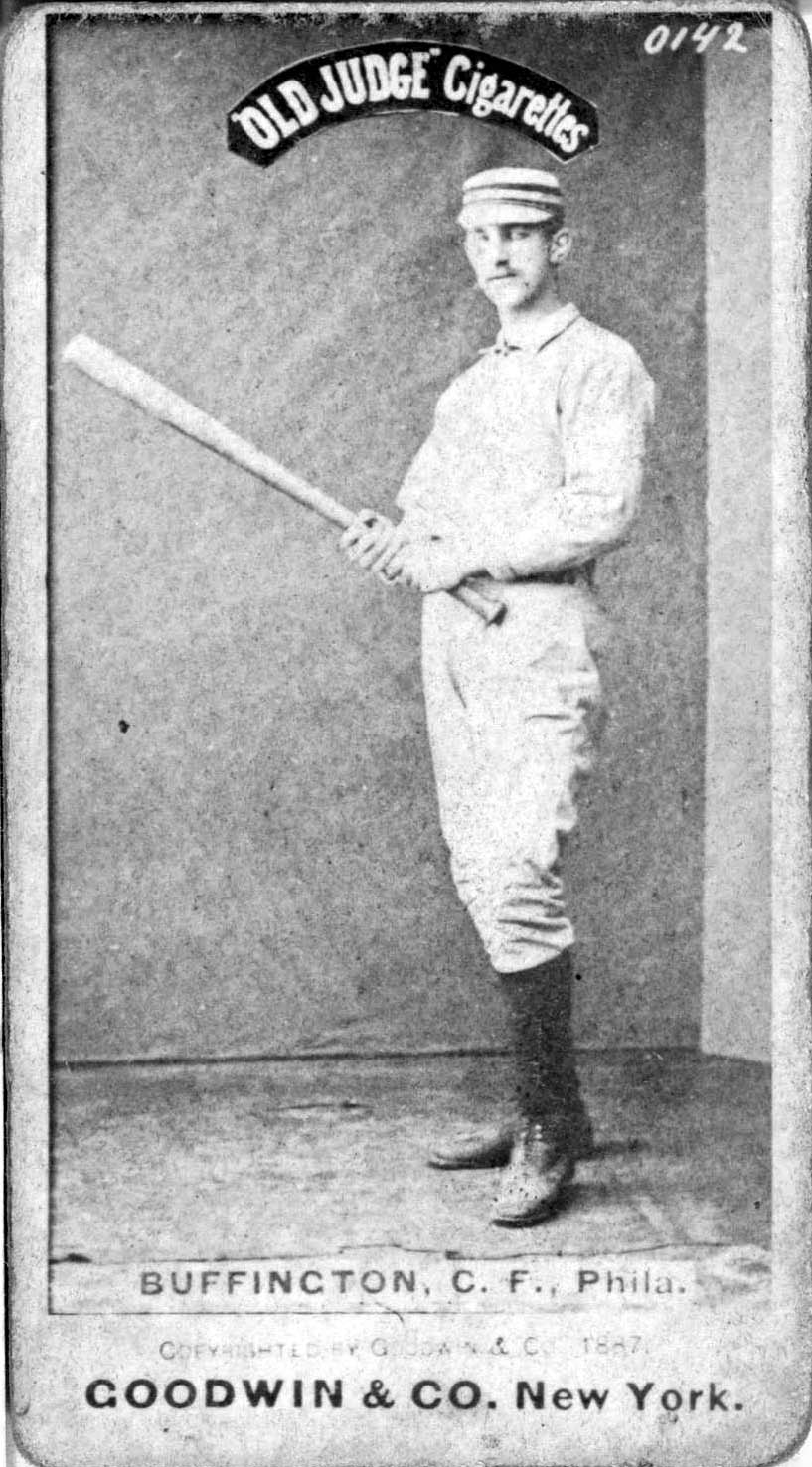
Starting pitcher, and manager, Charlie Buffinton

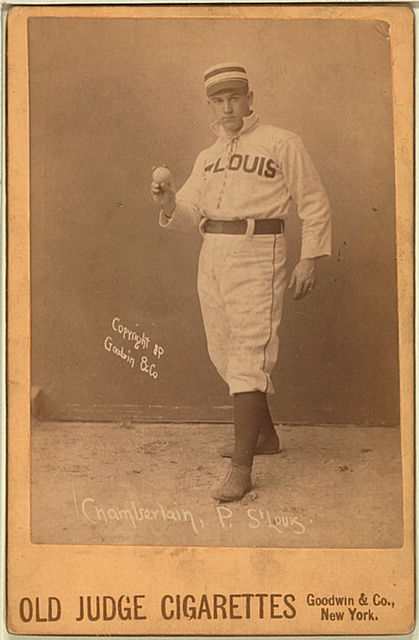
Starting pitcher Elton "Ice Box" Chamberlain

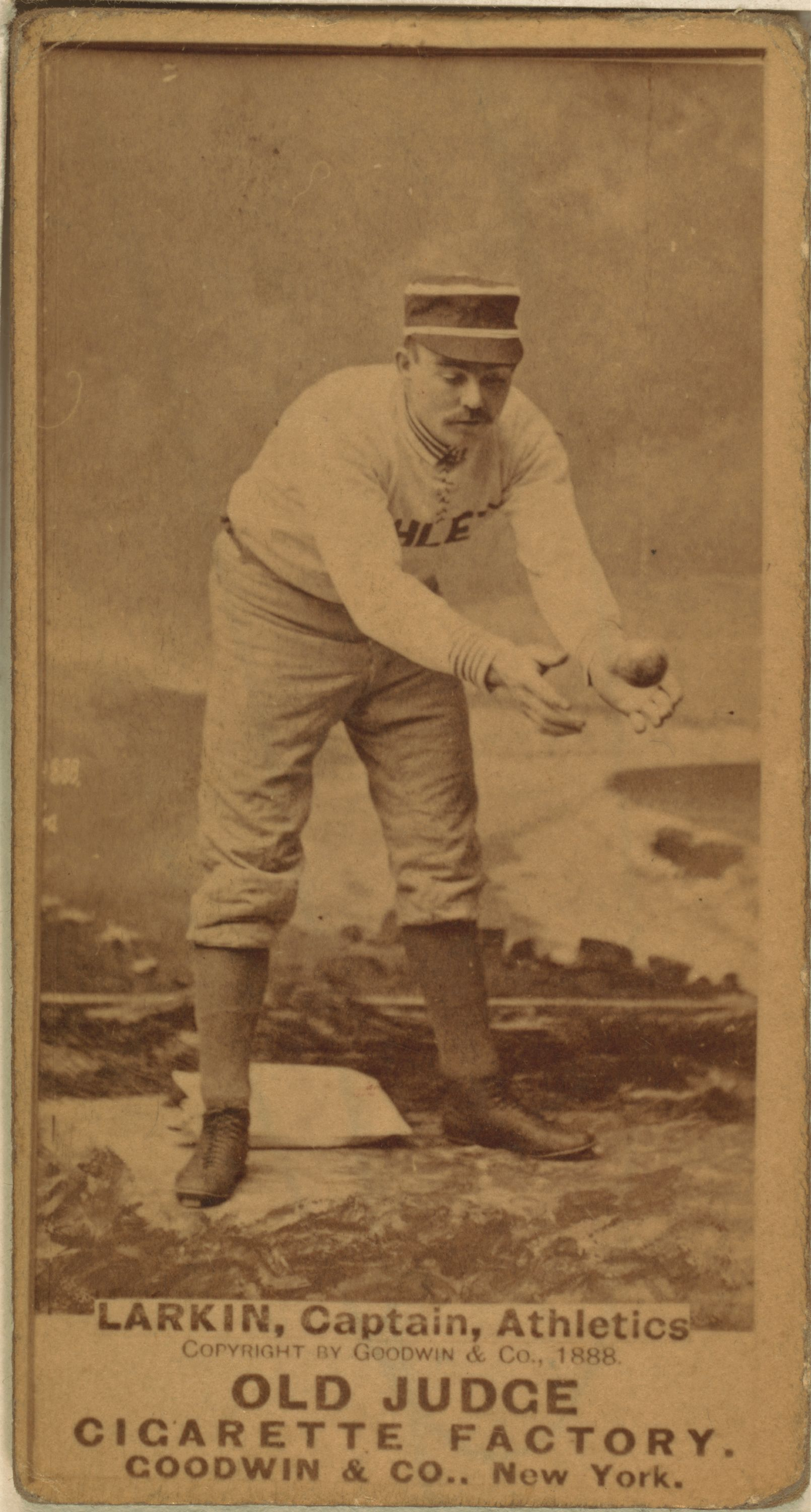
First baseman Henry Larkin

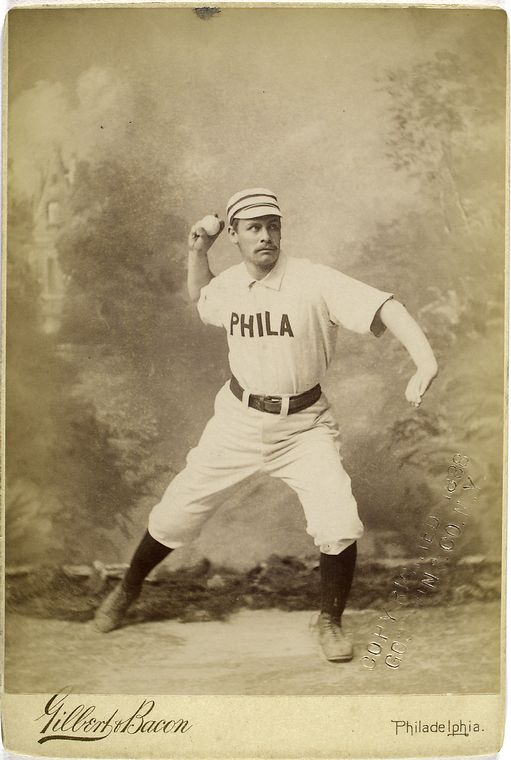
Starting pitcher Ben Sanders

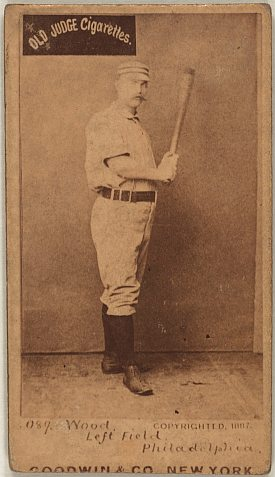
Left fielder, and manager, George Wood

| Player | Position | Seasons | Notes | Ref. |
|---|---|---|---|---|
| Ed Beecher | RF | 1891 | After being signed on June 29, Beecher, in his final major league season, played in 16 games before being released on July 28. | |
| Sumner Bowman | SP / OF | 1891 | In his final major league season, Bowman was signed on August 24, and finished with a 2–5 win–loss record in eight games pitched, while also playing six games in the outfield. | |
| Charlie Buffinton^{§} | SP | 1890 | During his lone season with the franchise, Buffinton had a 19–15 win–loss record as a pitcher, and a 3.81 earned run average. He was the team's player-manager for 116 games, taking over for Jim Fogarty after 16 games, and the team finished the season with a 61–54 win–loss record, for a .530 winning percentage. | |
| Will Calihan | SP | 1891 | During his final major league season, Calihan had a 6–6 win–loss record, and a 6.43 earned run average in 13 games pitched. | |
| Elton Chamberlain | SP | 1891 | Also known as Ice Box Chamberlain, he collected 22 of his 157 career victories during his lone season with the Athletics. | |
| Bill Clymer | SS | 1891 | Signed as an amateur free agent, Clymer's major league career consisted of three appearances with the Athletics. In 11 at bats, he did not collect a hit. | |
| Tommy Corcoran | SS | 1891 | Corcoran appeared in 133 games played for the Athletics, had a batting average of .254, scored 84 runs, and hit 15 triples in 511 at bats, while leading all shortstops with 300 putouts. | |
| Pop Corkhill | CF | 1891 | Corkhill had a batting average of .209 in 83 games before being released by the Athletics on July 28. | |
| Lave Cross | C / RF | 1890–1891 | Cross spent most of his first season with the team as a catcher, while playing sparingly in right field. However, he split time between the two evenly the following season. In 1891, he had a batting average of .301 in 110 games. | |
| Bert Cunningham | SP | 1890 | Cunningham pitched in 14 games, had a 5.22 earned run average, and a 3–9 win–loss record before being sold on July 15 to the Buffalo Bisons. | |
| Sid Farrar | 1B | 1890 | In 127 games played, Farrar had a .256 batting average, and scored 84 runs. It was his last major league season. | |
| Jim Fogarty^{§} | OF | 1890 | In his last major league season, Fogarty played in 91 games, and was the team's initial manager. After 16 games, and a 7–9 win–loss record, he was replaced by Charlie Buffinton for the remainder of the season. | |
| Pat Friel | RF | 1891 | Friel appeared in two games for the Athletics, collecting two hits in eight at bats, for a .250 batting average. It was the last of his two major league seasons. | |
| Mike Griffin | CF | 1890 | During his lone season with the Quakers, Griffin appeared in 115 games, collecting 140 hits, scored 127 runs, and had a .286 batting average in 489 at bats. | |
| Bill Hallman | 2B | 1890–1891 | After appearing in 84 games for the 1890 team as a utility player, Hallman was the everyday second baseman for 1891 team, leading the league in games played. | |
| Bill Husted | SP | 1890 | During his only major league season, Husted pitched in 18 games, had a 4.88 earned run average, and a 5–10 win–loss record. | |
| Phil Knell | SP | 1890 | In his lone season with the team, Knell pitched in 35 games, and had a 22–11 win–loss record, with a 3.83 earned run average. | |
| Henry Larkin | 1B | 1891 | Larkin played in 133 games, had a .279 batting average, while collecting 14 triples, and 10 home runs. | |
| Charles Matthews | RF | 1891 | Matthews' career consisted of one game, in which he collected one hit in three at bats. | |
| Jack McGeachey | OF | 1891 | McGeachey played with the Athletics in two different stints during the 1891 season; he began the season playing 46 games before moving onto the Boston Reds for 41 more. He later returned to play four games in Philadelphia to finish the season, his last in the major leagues. | |
| Dave McKeough | C | 1891 | In his second and final major league season, McKeough appeared in 15 games, 14 as a catcher, and collected 14 hits in 54 at bats for a .259 batting average. | |
| Jim McTamany | CF | 1891 | McTamany was signed on July 24, after having previously played for the Columbus Solons during the 1891 season. Although he led the league's outfielders in games played, it was his final major league season. | |
| George Meakim | SP | 1891 | Meakim appeared in six games, and had a 1–4 win–loss record, with a 6.94 earned run average. | |
| Jocko Milligan | C | 1890–1891 | After playing for the 1890 team, he returned to his previous team, the St. Louis Browns, but was purchased by Philadelphia in February. He led the AA with 35 doubles, but led the league with 40 passed balls as well. | |
| Joe Mulvey | 3B | 1890–1891 | Mulvey was the franchise's starting third baseman for both seasons, and had a .287 batting average and 16 triples in 1890. | |
| John Pickett | 2B | 1890 | In his lone season with the Quakers, he appeared in 100 games, had a .280 batting average, and scored 84 runs. | |
| Ben Sanders | SP | 1890–1891 | Sanders pitched in both of the franchise's seasons, and had win–loss records of 19–18 and 11–5, with earned run averages of 3.79 and 3.76 respectively. | |
| Dan Shannon | 2B | 1890 | Shannon began the 1890 season as the team's second baseman until he was sold on May 29 to another PL team, the New York Giants. | |
| Billy Shindle | SS | 1890 | As the starting shortstop for his lone season with the franchise, Shindle had a batting average of .324, collected 21 doubles, 21 triples, 10 home runs, and 189 hits, and scored 127 runs. | |
| Mike Sullivan | SP | 1891 | Sullivan began the season with the Athletics, appearing in two games and had a 0–2 win–loss record before finishing the season with the New York Giants of the NL. | |
| Gus Weyhing | SP | 1891 | Weyhing had a 31–20 win–loss record for the Quakers, the third of his four consecutive 30-win seasons. | |
| George Wood^{§} | LF | 1890–1891 | Wood was the franchise's starting left fielder for both seasons. He had batting averages of .289 and .309, and collected 109 runs batted in in 1890. In 1891, he became the team's manager, taking over for Bill Sharsig 27 games into the season. | |
