= 1891 Louisville Colonels season =

1891 Louisville Colonels
- League: American Association
- Ballpark: Eclipse Park
- City: Louisville, Kentucky
- Record: 54–83 (.394)
- League place: 5th
- Owner: Barney Dreyfuss
- Manager: Jack Chapman

The 1891 Louisville Colonels baseball team finished with a 54–83 record, collapsing back into mediocrity after their pennant winning season of 1890. They finished the season in eighth place in the American Association. After the season, the Association folded and four teams, including Louisville, were admitted into the National League.

== Regular season ==
=== Season standings ===
American Association
Team	W	L	Pct.	GB	Home	Road
Boston Reds	93	42	.689	—	51‍–‍17	42‍–‍25
St. Louis Browns	85	51	.625	8½	52‍–‍21	33‍–‍30
Baltimore Orioles	71	64	.526	22	44‍–‍24	27‍–‍40
Philadelphia Athletics	73	66	.525	22	43‍–‍26	30‍–‍40
Milwaukee Brewers	21	15	.583	22½	16‍–‍5	5‍–‍10
Cincinnati Kelly's Killers	43	57	.430	32½	24‍–‍21	19‍–‍36
Columbus Solons	61	76	.445	33	33‍–‍29	28‍–‍47
Louisville Colonels	54	83	.394	40	39‍–‍32	15‍–‍51
Washington Statesmen	44	91	.326	49	28‍–‍40	16‍–‍51

=== Record vs. opponents ===
1891 American Association record Sources:
Team	BAL	BSR	CKE	COL	LOU	MIL	PHA	STL	WAS
Baltimore	—	8–12–1	7–5	12–7	14–6	3–3	9–10–2	7–12–1	11–9
Boston	12–8–1	—	8–5	15–5	14–3–2	5–2	13–7–1	8–10	18–2
Cincinnati	5–7	5–8	—	8–7	7–9	0–0	4–8	5–14–1	9–4–1
Columbus	7–12	5–15	7–8	—	12–8	0–5	9–11	9–11	12–6–1
Louisville	6–14	3–14–2	9–7	8–12	—	1–3	8–12	9–11	10–10
Milwaukee	3–3	2–5	0–0	5–0	3–1	—	3–5	1–0	4–1
Philadelphia	10–9–2	7–13–1	8–4	11–9	12–8	5–3	—	10–10	10–10–1
St. Louis	12–7–1	10–8	14–5–1	11–9	11–9	0–1	10–10	—	17–2–1
Washington	9–11	2–18	4–9–1	6–12–1	10–10	1–4	10–10–1	2–17–1	—

=== Roster ===
1891 Louisville Colonels
Roster
Pitchers: Charlie Bell; George Boone; Ed Daily; John Doran; Red Ehret; Warren Fitzgerald; Jouett Meekin; Scott Stratton; Catchers: Grant Briggs; Tom Cahill; Paul Cook; Jack Ryan; Al Schellhase	Infielders: Ollie Beard; Jack Darragh; George Fox; Joe Gerhardt; John Irwin; Hughie Jennings; Bill Kuehne; Sam LaRocque; Pat Pettee; Harry Raymond; Nick Reeder; Tim Shinnick; Harry Taylor; Jack Wentz	Outfielders: Monk Cline; Patsy Donovan; Jim Long; Farmer Weaver; Jimmy Wolf	Manager: Jack Chapman

== Player stats ==
=== Batting ===
==== Starters by position ====
Note: Pos = Position; G = Games played; AB = At bats; H = Hits; Avg. = Batting average; HR = Home runs; RBI = Runs batted in

Pos	Player	G	AB	H	Avg.	HR	RBI
C	Tom Cahill	120	433	111	.256	3	47
1B	Harry Taylor	93	356	105	.295	2	37
2B	Tim Shinnick	126	436	96	.220	1	52
SS	Hughie Jennings	88	351	103	.293	1	58
3B	Ollie Beard	68	257	62	.241	0	24
OF	Chicken Wolf	136	528	135	.256	1	81
OF	Farmer Weaver	133	556	157	.282	1	53
OF	Patsy Donovan	105	439	141	.321	2	53

==== Other batters ====
Note: G = Games played; AB = At bats; H = Hits; Avg. = Batting average; HR = Home runs; RBI = Runs batted in

Player	G	AB	H	Avg.	HR	RBI
Jack Ryan	75	253	57	.225	2	25
Paul Cook	45	153	35	.229	0	23
Bill Kuehne	39	152	41	.270	1	17
Monk Cline	19	70	21	.300	0	11
Harry Raymond	14	59	12	.203	0	2
John Irwin	14	55	15	.273	0	7
Sam LaRocque	10	35	11	.314	1	8
Jim Long	30	25	6	.240	0	4
George Fox	6	19	2	.105	0	2
Al Schellhase	6	16	2	.125	0	0
Joe Gerhardt	2	6	0	.000	0	0
Pat Pettee	2	5	0	.000	0	0
Jack Wentz	1	4	1	.250	0	0
Grant Briggs	1	4	1	.250	0	0
Nick Reeder	1	2	0	.000	0	0
Jack Darragh	1	2	1	.500	0	0

=== Pitching ===
==== Starting pitchers ====
Note: G = Games pitched; IP = Innings pitched; W = Wins; L = Losses; ERA = Earned run average; SO = Strikeouts

Player	G	IP	W	L	ERA	SO
Warren Fitzgerald	33	276.0	14	17	3.59	111
Jouett Meekin	28	221.0	9	16	4.28	141
Red Ehret	26	220.2	13	13	3.47	76
Scott Stratton	20	172.0	6	13	4.08	52
John Doran	15	126.0	5	10	5.43	55
Ed Daily	15	111.1	4	8	5.74	27
Charlie Bell	10	77.0	2	6	4.68	16

==== Other pitchers ====
Note: G = Games pitched; IP = Innings pitched; W = Wins; L = Losses; ERA = Earned run average; SO = Strikeouts

Player	G	IP	W	L	ERA	SO
George Boone	4	15.0	0	0	7.80	4
