= 1891 St. Louis Browns season =

Major League Baseball season

1891 St. Louis Browns
- League: American Association
- Ballpark: Sportsman's Park
- City: St. Louis, Missouri
- Record: 85–51 (.625)
- League place: 2nd
- Owner: Chris von der Ahe
- Manager: Charlie Comiskey
- Stats: ESPN.com; Baseball Reference

The 1891 St. Louis Browns season was the team's tenth season in St. Louis, Missouri and the tenth season in the American Association. The Browns went 85–51 during the season and finished second in the American Association.

This was the Browns final season in the American Association. The league folded after the season, and the Browns moved to the National League where they remain today as the St. Louis Cardinals.

== Regular season ==
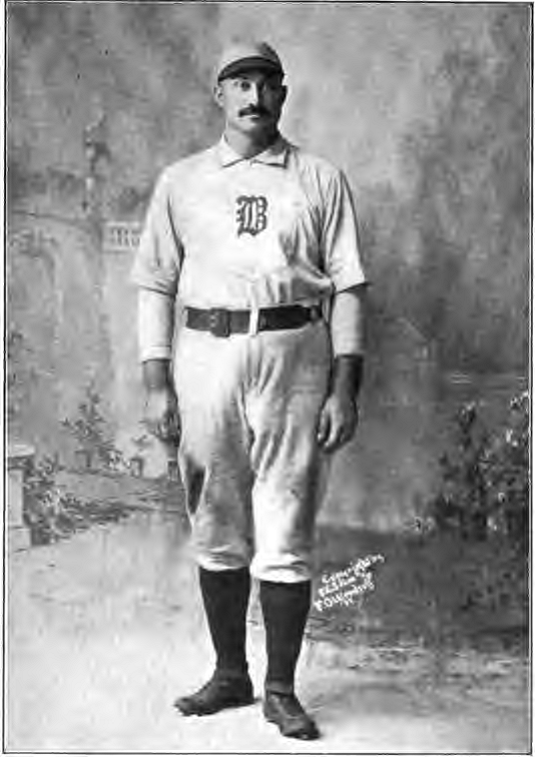
Pitcher Jack Stivetts

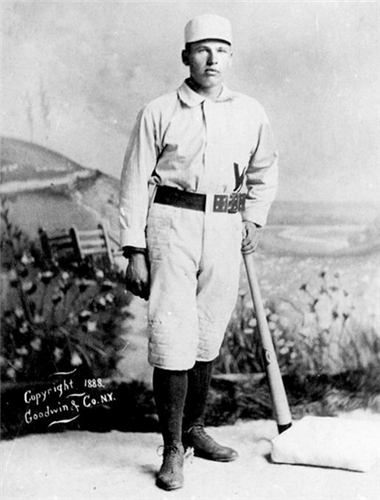
Center fielder Dummy Hoy

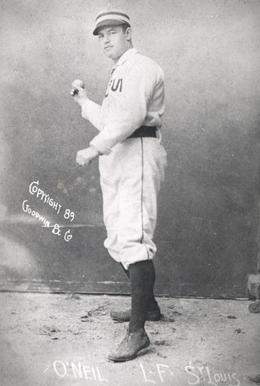
Left fielder Tip O'Neill

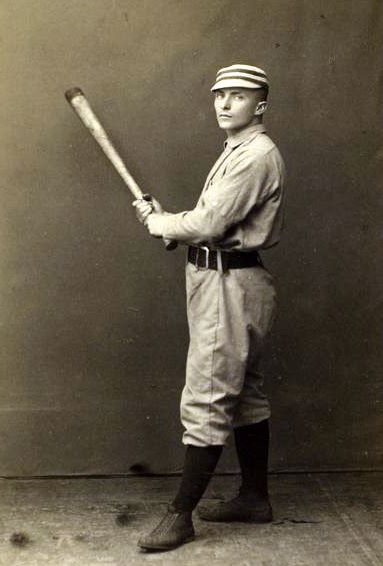
Right fielder Tommy McCarthy

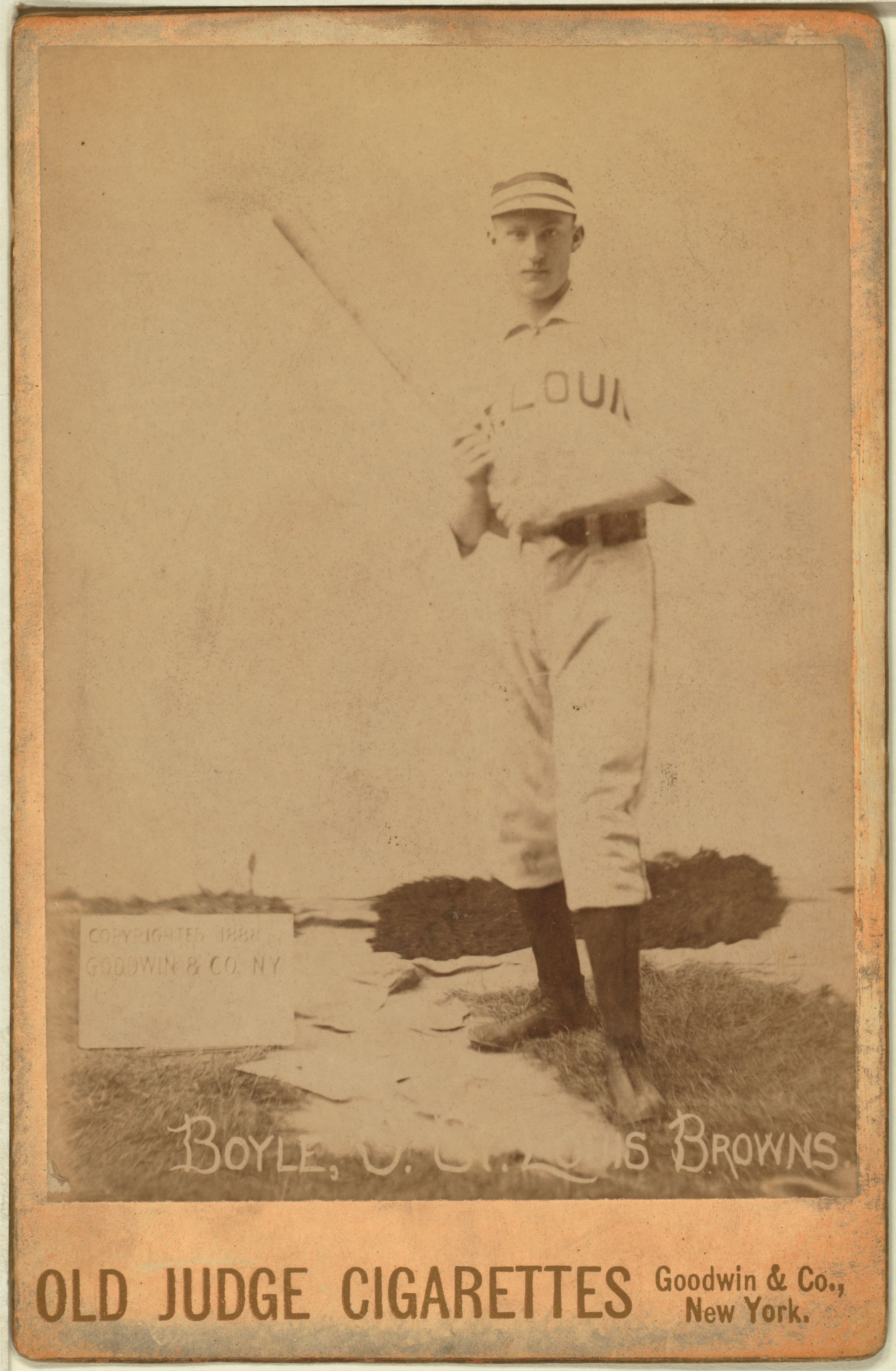
Catcher Jack Boyle

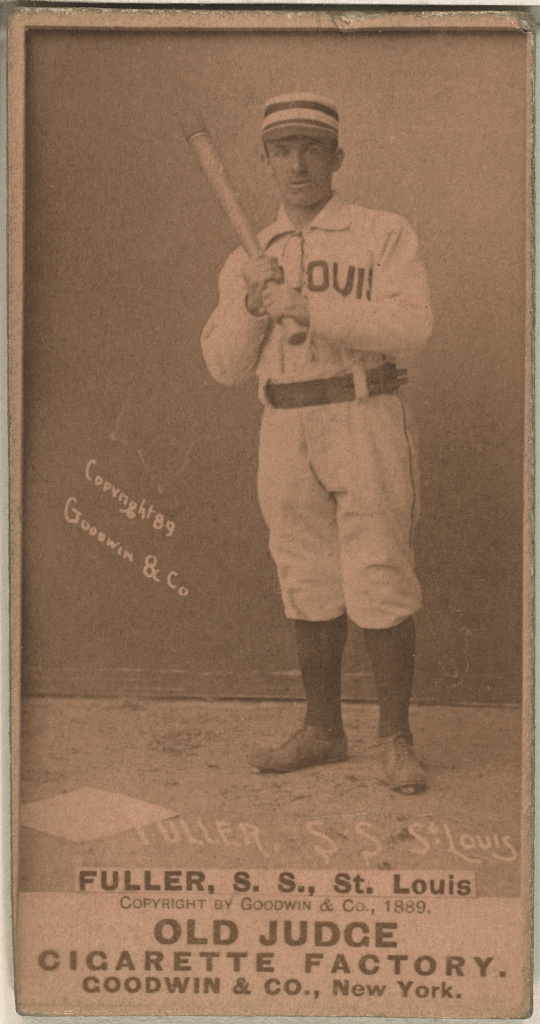
Shortstop Shorty Fuller

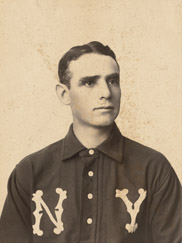
Pitcher Clark Griffith

=== Season standings ===
American Association
Team	W	L	Pct.	GB	Home	Road
Boston Reds	93	42	.689	—	51‍–‍17	42‍–‍25
St. Louis Browns	85	51	.625	8½	52‍–‍21	33‍–‍30
Baltimore Orioles	71	64	.526	22	44‍–‍24	27‍–‍40
Philadelphia Athletics	73	66	.525	22	43‍–‍26	30‍–‍40
Milwaukee Brewers	21	15	.583	22½	16‍–‍5	5‍–‍10
Cincinnati Kelly's Killers	43	57	.430	32½	24‍–‍21	19‍–‍36
Columbus Solons	61	76	.445	33	33‍–‍29	28‍–‍47
Louisville Colonels	54	83	.394	40	39‍–‍32	15‍–‍51
Washington Statesmen	44	91	.326	49	28‍–‍40	16‍–‍51

=== Record vs. opponents ===
1891 American Association record Sources:
Team	BAL	BSR	CKE	COL	LOU	MIL	PHA	STL	WAS
Baltimore	—	8–12–1	7–5	12–7	14–6	3–3	9–10–2	7–12–1	11–9
Boston	12–8–1	—	8–5	15–5	14–3–2	5–2	13–7–1	8–10	18–2
Cincinnati	5–7	5–8	—	8–7	7–9	0–0	4–8	5–14–1	9–4–1
Columbus	7–12	5–15	7–8	—	12–8	0–5	9–11	9–11	12–6–1
Louisville	6–14	3–14–2	9–7	8–12	—	1–3	8–12	9–11	10–10
Milwaukee	3–3	2–5	0–0	5–0	3–1	—	3–5	1–0	4–1
Philadelphia	10–9–2	7–13–1	8–4	11–9	12–8	5–3	—	10–10	10–10–1
St. Louis	12–7–1	10–8	14–5–1	11–9	11–9	0–1	10–10	—	17–2–1
Washington	9–11	2–18	4–9–1	6–12–1	10–10	1–4	10–10–1	2–17–1	—

=== Roster ===
1891 St. Louis Browns
Roster
Pitchers: Ted Breitenstein; Harry Burrell; Jesse Duryea; Jack Easton; Clark Griffith; Willie McGill; Joe Neale; George Rettger; Jack Stivetts	Catchers: Jack Boyle; Paul Cook; Dell Darling; John Munyan; John Schulze; Bill Zies; Infielders: Charlie Comiskey; Bill Eagan; Harry Fuller; Shorty Fuller; Denny Lyons; Mart McQuaid; Paul McSweeney; John Ricks; Yank Robinson; Art Whitney	Outfielders: Dummy Hoy; Tommy McCarthy; Tip O'Neill; Joe Visner	Manager: Charlie Comiskey

== Player stats ==
=== Batting ===
==== Starters by position ====
Note: Pos = Position; G = Games played; AB = At bats; H = Hits; Avg. = Batting average; HR = Home runs; RBI = Runs batted in

Pos	Player	G	AB	H	Avg.	HR	RBI
C	Jack Boyle	121	434	122	.281	5	79
1B	Charlie Comiskey	139	572	148	.259	2	88
2B	Bill Eagan	82	297	65	.219	4	43
3B	Denny Lyons	120	451	142	.315	11	84
SS	Shorty Fuller	135	576	122	.212	2	61
OF	Dummy Hoy	139	559	163	.292	5	64
OF	Tip O'Neill	127	514	166	.323	10	95
OF	Tommy McCarthy	134	570	176	.309	8	92

==== Other batters ====
Note: G = Games played; AB = At bats; H = Hits; Avg. = Batting average; HR = Home runs; RBI = Runs batted in

Player	G	AB	H	Avg.	HR	RBI
John Munyan	60	176	41	.233	0	19
Dell Darling	17	53	7	.132	0	9
Joe Visner	6	27	4	.148	0	1
Paul Cook	7	25	5	.200	0	1
John Ricks	5	18	3	.167	0	0
Paul McSweeney	3	12	3	.250	0	2
Mart McQuaid	4	11	4	.364	0	1
Art Whitney	3	11	0	.000	0	0
Yank Robinson	1	3	0	.000	0	0
Bill Zies	2	3	1	.333	0	0
Harry Fuller	1	2	0	.000	0	0
John Schulze	1	2	0	.000	0	0

=== Pitching ===
==== Starting pitchers ====
Note: G = Games pitched; IP = Innings pitched; W = Wins; L = Losses; ERA = Earned run average; SO = Strikeouts

Player	G	IP	W	L	ERA	SO
Jack Stivetts	64	440.0	33	22	2.86	259
Willie McGill	33	233.0	18	9	2.70	146
Joe Neale	15	110.1	6	4	4.24	24
George Rettger	14	92.2	7	3	3.40	49
Jack Easton	7	47.2	3	2	5.10	22
Jesse Duryea	3	24.0	1	1	3.38	13

==== Other pitchers ====
Note: G = Games pitched; IP = Innings pitched; W = Wins; L = Losses; ERA = Earned run average; SO = Strikeouts

Player	G	IP	W	L	ERA	SO
Clark Griffith	27	186.1	11	8	3.33	68
Harry Burrell	7	43.0	4	2	4.81	19
Ted Breitenstein	6	28.2	2	0	2.20	13

==== Relief pitchers ====
Note: G = Games pitched; W = Wins; L = Losses; SV = Saves; ERA = Earned run average; SO = Strikeouts

Player	G	W	L	SV	ERA	SO
Tommy McCarthy	1	0	0	0	9.00	0
