= 1891 Baltimore Orioles season =

1891 Baltimore Orioles
- League: American Association
- Ballpark: Union Park
- City: Baltimore, Maryland
- Record: 71–64 (.526)
- League place: 3rd
- Owner: Harry Von der Horst
- Manager: Billy Barnie

In their last season in the American Association, the 1891 Baltimore Orioles finished in fourth place (third among teams that played a full schedule) with a record of 71–64. After the season, the AA folded, and the Orioles joined the National League.

== Regular season ==
=== Season standings ===
American Association
Team	W	L	Pct.	GB	Home	Road
Boston Reds	93	42	.689	—	51‍–‍17	42‍–‍25
St. Louis Browns	85	51	.625	8½	52‍–‍21	33‍–‍30
Baltimore Orioles	71	64	.526	22	44‍–‍24	27‍–‍40
Philadelphia Athletics	73	66	.525	22	43‍–‍26	30‍–‍40
Milwaukee Brewers	21	15	.583	22½	16‍–‍5	5‍–‍10
Cincinnati Kelly's Killers	43	57	.430	32½	24‍–‍21	19‍–‍36
Columbus Solons	61	76	.445	33	33‍–‍29	28‍–‍47
Louisville Colonels	54	83	.394	40	39‍–‍32	15‍–‍51
Washington Statesmen	44	91	.326	49	28‍–‍40	16‍–‍51

=== Record vs. opponents ===
1891 American Association record Sources:
Team	BAL	BSR	CKE	COL	LOU	MIL	PHA	STL	WAS
Baltimore	—	8–12–1	7–5	12–7	14–6	3–3	9–10–2	7–12–1	11–9
Boston	12–8–1	—	8–5	15–5	14–3–2	5–2	13–7–1	8–10	18–2
Cincinnati	5–7	5–8	—	8–7	7–9	0–0	4–8	5–14–1	9–4–1
Columbus	7–12	5–15	7–8	—	12–8	0–5	9–11	9–11	12–6–1
Louisville	6–14	3–14–2	9–7	8–12	—	1–3	8–12	9–11	10–10
Milwaukee	3–3	2–5	0–0	5–0	3–1	—	3–5	1–0	4–1
Philadelphia	10–9–2	7–13–1	8–4	11–9	12–8	5–3	—	10–10	10–10–1
St. Louis	12–7–1	10–8	14–5–1	11–9	11–9	0–1	10–10	—	17–2–1
Washington	9–11	2–18	4–9–1	6–12–1	10–10	1–4	10–10–1	2–17–1	—

=== Roster ===
1891 Baltimore Orioles
Roster
Pitchers: Jersey Bakely; Bert Cunningham; Egyptian Healy; Kid Madden; Sadie McMahon	Catchers: Wilbert Robinson; George Townsend; Infielders: Pete Gilbert; John McGraw; John O'Connell; Joe Walsh; Perry Werden; Sam Wise	Outfielders: Lou Hardie; Lefty Johnson; Irv Ray; George Van Haltren; Curt Welch	Manager: Billy Barnie

== Player stats ==
=== Batting ===
==== Starters by position ====
Note: Pos = Position; G = Games played; AB = At bats; H = Hits; Avg. = Batting average; HR = Home runs; RBI = Runs batted in

Pos	Player	G	AB	H	Avg.	HR	RBI
C	Wilbert Robinson	93	334	72	.216	2	46
1B	Perry Werden	139	552	160	.290	6	104
2B	Sam Wise	103	388	96	.247	1	48
SS	Irv Ray	103	418	116	.278	0	58
3B	Pete Gilbert	139	513	118	.230	3	72
OF	Curt Welch	132	514	138	.268	3	55
OF	Lefty Johnson	129	480	130	.271	2	79
OF	George Van Haltren	139	566	180	.318	9	83

==== Other batters ====
Note: G = Games played; AB = At bats; H = Hits; Avg. = Batting average; HR = Home runs; RBI = Runs batted in

Player	G	AB	H	Avg.	HR	RBI
George Townsend	61	204	39	.191	0	18
John McGraw	33	115	31	.270	0	14
Joe Walsh	26	100	21	.210	1	10
Lou Hardie	15	56	13	.232	0	1
John O'Connell	8	29	5	.172	0	7

=== Pitching ===
==== Starting pitchers ====
Note: G = Games pitched; IP = Innings pitched; W = Wins; L = Losses; ERA = Earned run average; SO = Strikeouts

Player	G	IP	W	L	ERA	SO
Sadie McMahon	61	503.0	35	24	2.81	219
Bert Cunningham	30	237.2	11	14	4.01	59
Kid Madden	32	224.0	13	12	4.10	56
Egyptian Healy	23	170.1	8	10	3.75	54
Jersey Bakely	8	59.0	4	2	2.29	13

==== Other pitchers ====
Note: G = Games pitched; IP = Innings pitched; W = Wins; L = Losses; ERA = Earned run average; SO = Strikeouts

Player	G	IP	W	L	ERA	SO
George Van Haltren	6	23.0	0	1	5.09	7
