= 1891 Boston Reds season =

1891 Boston Reds
- 1891 American Association Championship
- League: American Association
- Ballpark: Congress Street Grounds
- City: Boston, Massachusetts
- Record: 93–42 (.689)
- League place: 1st
- Manager: Arthur Irwin
- Captain: Hugh Duffy

The 1891 Boston Reds baseball team finished the season with a 93–42 record and won the American Association championship in their first season in the new league after the demise of the Players' League. Thus they became only the second team (after the 1889–1890 Brooklyn Bridegrooms) to win championships in two different leagues in successive seasons, as well as the only team to win the pennant every single season of its existence. After the season, the AA also disbanded, and the Reds team folded with the league.

== Regular season ==
=== Season standings ===
American Association
| Team | W | L | Pct. | GB | Home | Road |
|---|---|---|---|---|---|---|
| Boston Reds | 93 | 42 | .689 | — | 51‍–‍17 | 42‍–‍25 |
| St. Louis Browns | 85 | 51 | .625 | 8½ | 52‍–‍21 | 33‍–‍30 |
| Baltimore Orioles | 71 | 64 | .526 | 22 | 44‍–‍24 | 27‍–‍40 |
| Philadelphia Athletics | 73 | 66 | .525 | 22 | 43‍–‍26 | 30‍–‍40 |
| Milwaukee Brewers | 21 | 15 | .583 | 22½ | 16‍–‍5 | 5‍–‍10 |
| Cincinnati Kelly's Killers | 43 | 57 | .430 | 32½ | 24‍–‍21 | 19‍–‍36 |
| Columbus Solons | 61 | 76 | .445 | 33 | 33‍–‍29 | 28‍–‍47 |
| Louisville Colonels | 54 | 83 | .394 | 40 | 39‍–‍32 | 15‍–‍51 |
| Washington Statesmen | 44 | 91 | .326 | 49 | 28‍–‍40 | 16‍–‍51 |

=== Record vs. opponents ===
1891 American Association record Sources:
| Team | BAL | BSR | CKE | COL | LOU | MIL | PHA | STL | WAS |
|---|---|---|---|---|---|---|---|---|---|
| Baltimore | — | 8–12–1 | 7–5 | 12–7 | 14–6 | 3–3 | 9–10–2 | 7–12–1 | 11–9 |
| Boston | 12–8–1 | — | 8–5 | 15–5 | 14–3–2 | 5–2 | 13–7–1 | 8–10 | 18–2 |
| Cincinnati | 5–7 | 5–8 | — | 8–7 | 7–9 | 0–0 | 4–8 | 5–14–1 | 9–4–1 |
| Columbus | 7–12 | 5–15 | 7–8 | — | 12–8 | 0–5 | 9–11 | 9–11 | 12–6–1 |
| Louisville | 6–14 | 3–14–2 | 9–7 | 8–12 | — | 1–3 | 8–12 | 9–11 | 10–10 |
| Milwaukee | 3–3 | 2–5 | 0–0 | 5–0 | 3–1 | — | 3–5 | 1–0 | 4–1 |
| Philadelphia | 10–9–2 | 7–13–1 | 8–4 | 11–9 | 12–8 | 5–3 | — | 10–10 | 10–10–1 |
| St. Louis | 12–7–1 | 10–8 | 14–5–1 | 11–9 | 11–9 | 0–1 | 10–10 | — | 17–2–1 |
| Washington | 9–11 | 2–18 | 4–9–1 | 6–12–1 | 10–10 | 1–4 | 10–10–1 | 2–17–1 | — |

=== Roster ===
1891 Boston Reds
Roster
| Pitchers: Charlie Buffinton; Bill Daley; John Fitzgerald; Clark Griffith; George Haddock; Kid Madden; Darby O'Brien | Catchers: Tom Cotter; Tim Donahue; Mike Flynn; King Kelly; Morgan Murphy; Frank Quinlan; Infielders: Dan Brouthers; Duke Farrell; Arthur Irwin; Bill Joyce; Paul Radford; Cub Stricker | Outfielders: Tom Brown; Tommy Dowd; Hugh Duffy; John Irwin; Jack McGeachey; Hardy Richardson | Manager: Arthur Irwin |

== Player stats ==
=== Batting ===
==== Starters by position ====
Note: Pos = Position; G = Games played; AB = At bats; H = Hits; Avg. = Batting average; HR = Home runs; RBI = Runs batted in

| Pos | Player | G | AB | H | Avg. | HR | RBI |
|---|---|---|---|---|---|---|---|
| C | Morgan Murphy | 106 | 402 | 87 | .216 | 4 | 54 |
| 1B | Dan Brouthers | 130 | 486 | 170 | .350 | 5 | 109 |
| 2B | Cub Stricker | 139 | 514 | 111 | .216 | 0 | 46 |
| SS | Paul Radford | 133 | 456 | 118 | .259 | 0 | 65 |
| 3B | Duke Farrell | 122 | 473 | 143 | .302 | 12 | 110 |
| OF | Hugh Duffy | 127 | 536 | 180 | .336 | 9 | 110 |
| OF | Tom Brown | 137 | 589 | 189 | .321 | 5 | 72 |
| OF | Hardy Richardson | 74 | 278 | 71 | .255 | 7 | 52 |

==== Other batters ====
Note: G = Games played; AB = At bats; H = Hits; Avg. = Batting average; HR = Home runs; RBI = Runs batted in

| Player | G | AB | H | Avg. | HR | RBI |
|---|---|---|---|---|---|---|
| Bill Joyce | 65 | 243 | 75 | .309 | 3 | 51 |
| Jack McGeachey | 41 | 178 | 45 | .253 | 1 | 21 |
| John Irwin | 19 | 72 | 16 | .222 | 0 | 15 |
| Arthur Irwin | 6 | 17 | 2 | .118 | 0 | 0 |
| King Kelly | 4 | 15 | 4 | .267 | 1 | 4 |
| Tom Cotter | 6 | 12 | 3 | .250 | 0 | 4 |
| Tommy Dowd | 4 | 11 | 1 | .091 | 0 | 0 |
| Tim Donahue | 4 | 7 | 0 | .000 | 0 | 0 |
| Frank Quinlan | 2 | 5 | 0 | .000 | 0 | 0 |
| Mike Flynn | 1 | 2 | 0 | .000 | 0 | 0 |

=== Pitching ===
==== Starting pitchers ====
Note: G = Games pitched; IP = Innings pitched; W = Wins; L = Losses; ERA = Earned run average; SO = Strikeouts

| Player | G | IP | W | L | ERA | SO |
|---|---|---|---|---|---|---|
| George Haddock | 51 | 379.2 | 34 | 11 | 2.49 | 169 |
| Charlie Buffinton | 48 | 363.2 | 29 | 9 | 2.55 | 158 |
| Cinders O'Brien | 40 | 268.2 | 18 | 13 | 3.65 | 87 |
| Kid Madden | 1 | 8.0 | 0 | 1 | 6.75 | 6 |

==== Other pitchers ====
Note: G = Games pitched; IP = Innings pitched; W = Wins; L = Losses; ERA = Earned run average; SO = Strikeouts

| Player | G | IP | W | L | ERA | SO |
|---|---|---|---|---|---|---|
| Bill Daley | 19 | 126.2 | 8 | 6 | 2.98 | 68 |
| Clark Griffith | 7 | 40.0 | 3 | 1 | 5.63 | 20 |
| John Fitzgerald | 6 | 32.0 | 1 | 1 | 5.63 | 16 |

==== Relief pitchers ====
Note: G = Games pitched; W = Wins; L = Losses; SV = Saves; ERA = Earned run average; SO = Strikeouts

| Player | G | W | L | SV | ERA | SO |
|---|---|---|---|---|---|---|
| Paul Radford | 1 | 0 | 0 | 0 | 0.00 | 0 |
