= John Schulze (baseball) =

American baseball player (1866–1941)

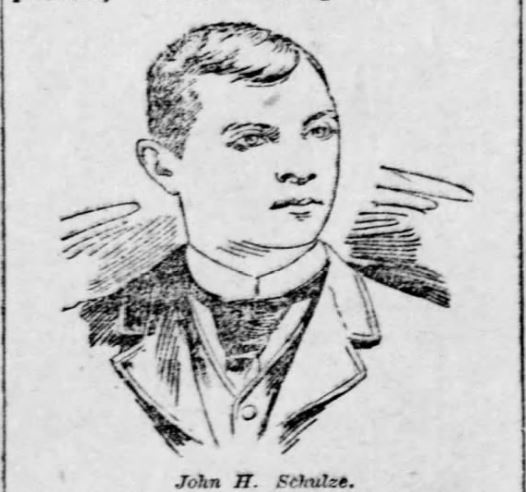
- Catcher
- Born: April 4, 1866; St. Louis, Missouri, U.S.
- Died: May 19, 1941 (aged 75); St. Louis, Missouri, U.S.
- Batted: Unknown Threw: Unknown

MLB debut
- August 7, 1891, for the St. Louis Browns

Last MLB appearance
- August 7, 1891, for the St. Louis Browns

MLB statistics
- Games played: 1
- At bats: 2
- Hits: 0
- Stats at Baseball Reference

Teams
- St. Louis Browns (1891)

John H. Schulze (April 4, 1866 – May 19, 1941) was an American catcher in Major League Baseball who played for the 1891 St. Louis Browns of the American Association. He was born in St. Louis, Missouri.

Schulze was a major league player whose career, statistically speaking, was only slightly different from that of Eddie Gaedel or Moonlight Graham. On August 7, 1891, he debuted with the Browns and went hit-less in two at-bats. He did not have a fielding chance, and never appeared in a major league game again.

Schulze died in his native St. Louis at the age of 75.

== See also ==
- 1891 St. Louis Browns season
- Cup of coffee
