= Harry Fuller (baseball) =

American baseball player (1862–1895)

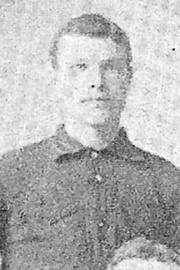
- Third baseman
- Born: December 5, 1862; Cincinnati, Ohio, U.S.
- Died: December 12, 1895 (aged 33); Cincinnati, Ohio, U.S.
- Batted: Unknown Threw: Unknown

MLB debut
- September 19, 1891, for the St. Louis Browns

Last MLB appearance
- September 19, 1891, for the St. Louis Browns

MLB statistics
- Batting average: .000
- Home runs: 0
- Runs batted in: 0
- Stats at Baseball Reference

Teams
- St. Louis Browns (1891)

Henry W. Fuller (December 5, 1862 – December 12, 1895) was an American professional baseball player who played third base in the Major Leagues for the 1891 St. Louis Browns. His brother, Shorty Fuller, also played professional baseball.
