= John Ricks =

American baseball player (1867–1920)

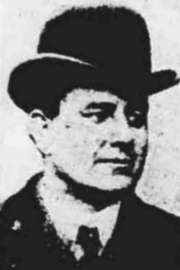
- Third baseman
- Born: September 26, 1867; St. Louis, Missouri
- Died: August 31, 1920 (aged 52); St. Louis, Missouri
- Batted: Unknown Threw: Unknown

MLB debut
- September 21, 1891, for the St. Louis Browns

Last MLB appearance
- July 4, 1894, for the St. Louis Browns

MLB statistics
- Batting average: .158
- Home runs: 0
- Runs batted in: 0
- Stats at Baseball Reference

Teams
- St. Louis Browns (1891, 1894)

John J. Ricks (September 26, 1867 – August 31, 1920) was a professional baseball player who played third base in the Major Leagues for the 1891 and 1894 St. Louis Browns.
