= Larry Murphy (baseball) =

Canadian baseball player (1857–1911)

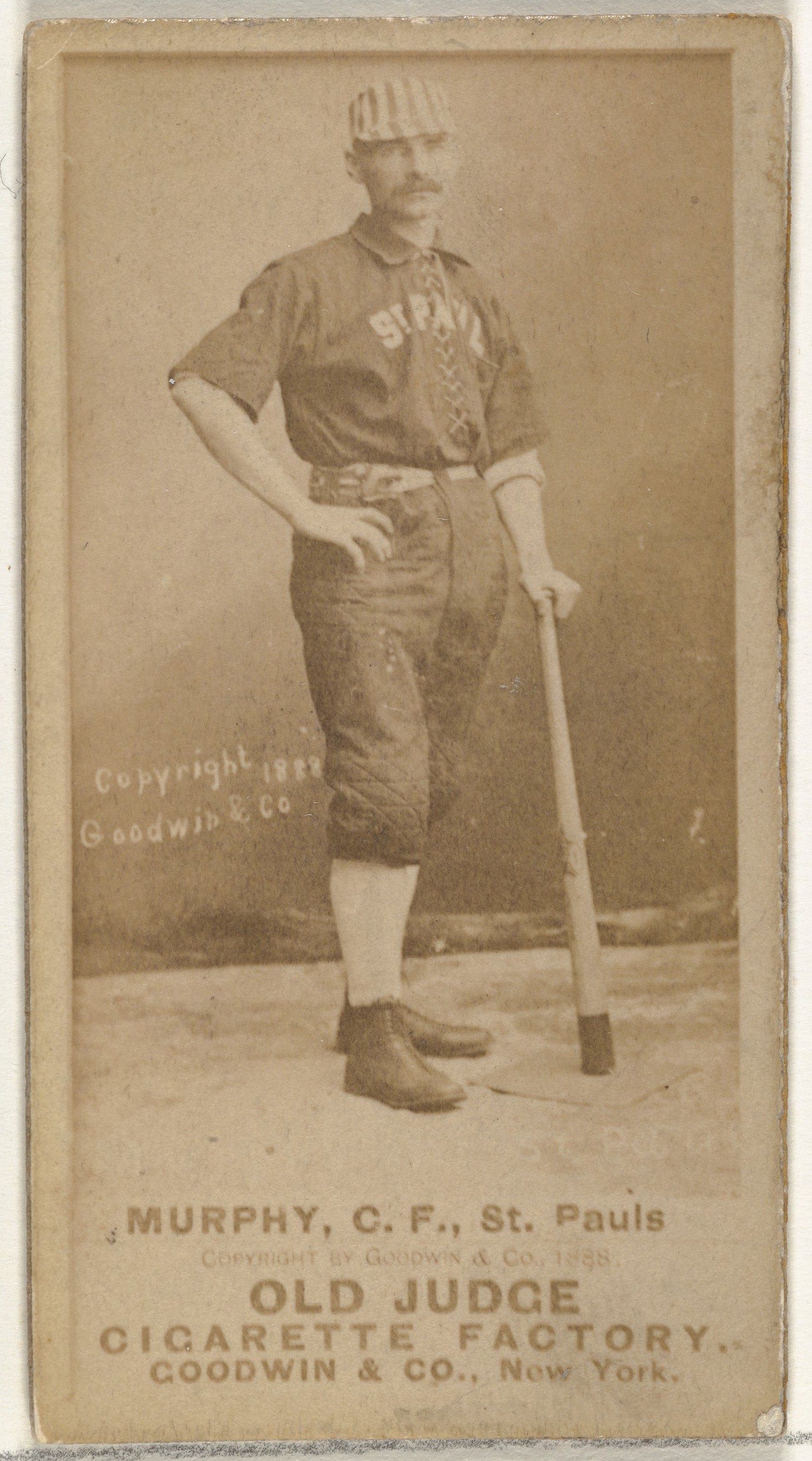
- Outfielder
- Born: March 17, 1857; Toronto, Ontario, Canada
- Died: October 6, 1911 (aged 54); Indianapolis, Indiana, US
- Batted: Left Threw: Unknown

MLB debut
- May 30, 1891, for the Washington Statesmen

Last MLB appearance
- October 6, 1891, for the Washington Statesmen

MLB statistics
- Batting average: .265
- Home runs: 1
- Runs batted in: 35
- Stats at Baseball Reference

Teams
- Washington Statesmen (1891)

Patrick Lawrence Murphy (March 17, 1857 – October 6, 1911) was a Canadian outfielder in Major League Baseball for the Washington Statesmen.

Born in Toronto, Ontario, he made his major league debut on May 30, 1891, at the age of 34. He would only play that one season. He played in 101 games with an .265 batting average, 1 home run, 35 runs batted in and 29 stolen bases.
