= John Slagle =

American baseball player (1869–1915)

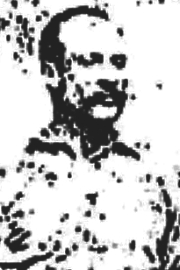
- Pitcher
- Born: November 1869; Lawrence, Indiana, U.S.
- Died: February 19, 1915 (aged 45); Indianapolis, Indiana, U.S.
- Batted: Left Threw: Right

MLB debut
- April 30, 1891, for the Cincinnati Kelly's Killers

Last MLB appearance
- April 30, 1891, for the Cincinnati Kelly's Killers

MLB statistics
- Win–loss record: 0–0
- Earned run average: 0.00
- Strikeouts: 1
- Stats at Baseball Reference

Teams
- Cincinnati Kelly's Killers (1891)

John A. Slagle (November 1869 – February 19, 1915) was an American pitcher in Major League Baseball. He pitched one game, 1 1/3 scoreless innings, being credited with a save, for the Cincinnati Kelly's Killers of the American Association on April 30, 1891. After his brief major league appearance, Slagle pitched through 1896 in the minor leagues.
