= 1891 Cincinnati Kelly's Killers season =

1891 Cincinnati Kelly's Killers
- Also known as the Cincinnati Reds
- League: American Association
- Ballpark: East End Park
- City: Cincinnati, Ohio
- Record: 43–57 (.430)
- League place: 6th
- Owner: Chris von der Ahe
- Manager: King Kelly
- Captain: King Kelly

The 1891 Cincinnati Kelly's Killers season was a season in American baseball. The "Kelly" in the name came from manager King Kelly, who was also the team's starting catcher. In 1891, their only season of existence, they finished with a record of 43–57, good for sixth place in the American Association, 32½ games behind the Boston Reds.

The team, which was also called the Cincinnati Reds, folded on August 17, and was replaced by the Milwaukee Brewers, brought in from the Western League. Kelly himself moved on to the Boston Reds. After the season, the American Association itself folded.

== Regular season ==
=== Season standings ===
American Association
Team	W	L	Pct.	GB	Home	Road
Boston Reds	93	42	.689	—	51‍–‍17	42‍–‍25
St. Louis Browns	85	51	.625	8½	52‍–‍21	33‍–‍30
Baltimore Orioles	71	64	.526	22	44‍–‍24	27‍–‍40
Philadelphia Athletics	73	66	.525	22	43‍–‍26	30‍–‍40
Milwaukee Brewers	21	15	.583	22½	16‍–‍5	5‍–‍10
Cincinnati Kelly's Killers	43	57	.430	32½	24‍–‍21	19‍–‍36
Columbus Solons	61	76	.445	33	33‍–‍29	28‍–‍47
Louisville Colonels	54	83	.394	40	39‍–‍32	15‍–‍51
Washington Statesmen	44	91	.326	49	28‍–‍40	16‍–‍51

=== Record vs. opponents ===
1891 American Association record Sources:
Team	BAL	BSR	CKE	COL	LOU	MIL	PHA	STL	WAS
Baltimore	—	8–12–1	7–5	12–7	14–6	3–3	9–10–2	7–12–1	11–9
Boston	12–8–1	—	8–5	15–5	14–3–2	5–2	13–7–1	8–10	18–2
Cincinnati	5–7	5–8	—	8–7	7–9	0–0	4–8	5–14–1	9–4–1
Columbus	7–12	5–15	7–8	—	12–8	0–5	9–11	9–11	12–6–1
Louisville	6–14	3–14–2	9–7	8–12	—	1–3	8–12	9–11	10–10
Milwaukee	3–3	2–5	0–0	5–0	3–1	—	3–5	1–0	4–1
Philadelphia	10–9–2	7–13–1	8–4	11–9	12–8	5–3	—	10–10	10–10–1
St. Louis	12–7–1	10–8	14–5–1	11–9	11–9	0–1	10–10	—	17–2–1
Washington	9–11	2–18	4–9–1	6–12–1	10–10	1–4	10–10–1	2–17–1	—

=== Roster ===
1891 Cincinnati Kelly's Killers
Roster
Pitchers: Charlie Bell; Ed Crane; Frank Dwyer; Jack Keenan; Matt Kilroy; Willard Mains; Willie McGill; John Slagle; Wild Bill Widner	Catchers: Jerry Hurley; King Kelly; Farmer Vaughn; Infielders: Charlie Bastian; Joe Burke; Jim Canavan; Jack Carney; Billy Clingman; Yank Robinson; Art Whitney	Outfielders: Ed Andrews; Dick Johnston; Lefty Marr; Emmett Seery	Manager: King Kelly

== Player stats ==
=== Batting ===
==== Starters by position ====
Note: Pos = Position; G = Games played; AB = At bats; H = Hits; Avg. = Batting average; HR = Home runs; RBI = Runs batted in

Pos	Player	G	AB	H	Avg.	HR	RBI
C	King Kelly	82	283	84	.297	1	53
1B	John Carney	99	367	102	.278	3	43
2B	Yank Robinson	97	342	61	.178	1	37
SS	Jim Canavan	101	426	97	.228	7	66
3B	Art Whitney	93	347	69	.199	3	33
OF	Emmett Seery	97	372	106	.285	4	36
OF	Ed Andrews	83	356	75	.211	0	26
OF	Dick Johnston	99	376	83	.221	6	51

==== Other batters ====
Note: G = Games played; AB = At bats; H = Hits; Avg. = Batting average; HR = Home runs; RBI = Runs batted in

Player	G	AB	H	Avg.	HR	RBI
Farmer Vaughn	51	175	45	.257	1	14
Jerry Hurley	24	66	14	.212	0	6
Lefty Marr	14	57	11	.193	0	4
Billy Clingman	1	5	1	.200	0	0
Joe Burke	1	4	1	.250	0	1
Charlie Bastian	1	4	0	.000	0	0

=== Pitching ===
==== Starting pitchers ====
Note: G = Games pitched; IP = Innings pitched; W = Wins; L = Losses; ERA = Earned run average; SO = Strikeouts

Player	G	IP	W	L	ERA	SO
Frank Dwyer	35	289.0	13	19	4.52	101
Ed Crane	32	250.0	14	14	2.55	122
Willard Mains	30	204.0	12	12	2.69	76
Willie McGill	8	65.0	2	5	4.98	19
Matt Kilroy	7	45.1	1	4	2.98	6
Charlie Bell	1	9.0	1	0	0.00	1
Wild Bill Widner	1	8.0	0	1	7.88	0
Jack Keenan	1	8.0	0	1	0.00	5

==== Relief pitchers ====
Note: G = Games pitched; W = Wins; L = Losses; SV = Saves; ERA = Earned run average; SO = Strikeouts

Player	G	W	L	SV	ERA	SO
King Kelly	3	0	1	0	5.28	0
Farmer Vaughn	1	0	0	0	3.86	0
John Slagle	1	0	0	1	0.00	1
