= Joe Walsh (second baseman/shortstop) =

American baseball player (1864–1911)

- Shortstop/Second baseman
- Born: November 5, 1864; Chicago, Illinois, U.S.
- Died: August 8, 1911 (aged 46); Omaha, Nebraska, U.S.
- Batted: Left Threw: Right

MLB debut
- September 3, 1891, for the Baltimore Orioles

Last MLB appearance
- October 6, 1891, for the Baltimore Orioles

MLB statistics
- Batting average: .210
- Home runs: 1
- Runs batted in: 10
- Stats at Baseball Reference

Teams
- Baltimore Orioles (1891)

Joseph R. Walsh (November 5, 1864 – August 8, 1911) was an American Major League Baseball player. Walsh played for the Baltimore Orioles in 1891. He batted left and threw right-handed.

He was born in Chicago, Illinois, and died in Omaha, Nebraska.
