= Ed Cassian =

American baseball player (1867–1918)

- Pitcher
- Born: November 28, 1867; Wilbraham, Massachusetts, U.S.
- Died: September 10, 1918 (aged 50); Meriden, Connecticut, U.S.
- Threw: Right

MLB debut
- June 26, 1891, for the Philadelphia Phillies

Last MLB appearance
- September 10, 1891, for the Washington Statesmen

MLB statistics
- Earned run average: 4.45
- Strikeouts: 24
- Stats at Baseball Reference

Teams
- Philadelphia Phillies (1891); Washington Statesmen (1891)

Edwin T. Cassian (November 28, 1867 – September 10, 1918) was an American Major League Baseball pitcher. He was born on November 8, 1867, in Wilbraham, Massachusetts. He played just one season in the Major League Baseball, with the Philadelphia Phillies and Washington Senators in 1891 at the age of 23. Cassian had a 3–7 career record in 13 games and an ERA of 4.45. He died on September 10, 1918, in Meriden, Connecticut.
