= George Boone =

American baseball player (1871–1910)

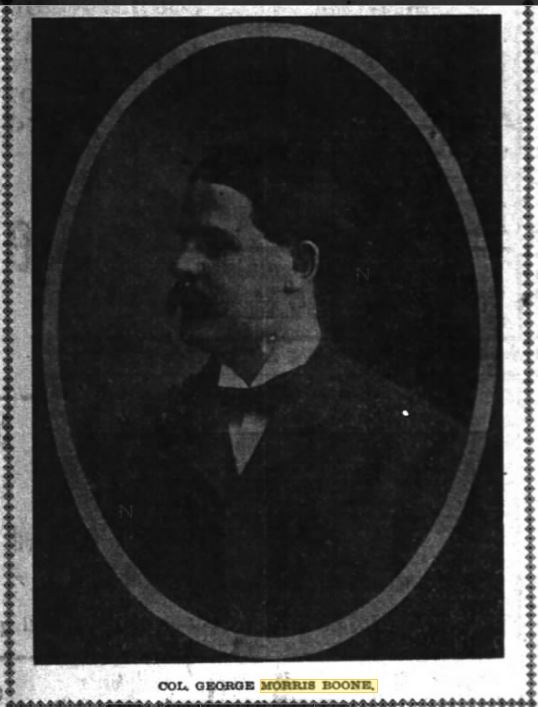
- Pitcher
- Born: March 1, 1871; Louisville, Kentucky
- Died: September 24, 1910 (aged 39); Louisville, Kentucky
- Batted: Unknown Threw: Unknown

MLB debut
- April 23, 1891, for the Louisville Colonels

Last MLB appearance
- May 13, 1891, for the Louisville Colonels

MLB statistics
- Win–loss record: 0–0
- Earned run average: 7.80
- Strikeouts: 4
- Stats at Baseball Reference

Teams
- Louisville Colonels (1891)

George Morris Boone (March 1, 1871 – September 24, 1910) was a Major League Baseball pitcher. He played in the majors for the Louisville Colonels of the American Association during the 1891 season.

In 1910, Boone died from an accidental overdose of medication taken to relieve insomnia.
