= Jack Darragh (baseball) =

American baseball player (1866–1939)

- First baseman
- Born: July 17, 1866; Ebensburg, Pennsylvania
- Died: August 12, 1939 (aged 73); Rochester, Pennsylvania
- Batted: Unknown Threw: Unknown

MLB debut
- May 13, 1891, for the Louisville Colonels

Last MLB appearance
- May 13, 1891, for the Louisville Colonels

MLB statistics
- Batting average: .500
- Home runs: 0
- Runs scored: 0
- Stats at Baseball Reference

Teams
- Louisville Colonels (1891)

James S. "Jack" Darragh (July 17, 1866 – August 12, 1939) was a first baseman in Major League Baseball in the 19th century. He played for the Louisville Colonels of the American Association in 1891. He went to the University of Pennsylvania.

== Minor League career ==
After the 1891 Colonels season, Darragh played for the Philadelphia Athletics in the Eastern League in 1892. He then played for and managed the East Liverpool East End All Stars in the Ohio-Michigan League in 1893.

== Sources ==
- Career statistics from Baseball Reference · Baseball Reference (Minors) · Retrosheet · Baseball Almanac
