= Lou Hardie =

American baseball player (1864–1929)

- Catcher / Outfielder
- Born: August 24, 1864; New York City, New York, U.S.
- Died: March 5, 1929 (aged 64); Oakland, California, U.S.
- Batted: Right Threw: Unknown

MLB debut
- May 22, 1884, for the Philadelphia Quakers

Last MLB appearance
- August 5, 1891, for the Baltimore Orioles

MLB statistics
- Batting average: .223
- Runs scored: 28
- Runs batted in: 21
- Stats at Baseball Reference

Teams
- Philadelphia Quakers (1884); Chicago White Stockings (1886); Boston Beaneaters (1890); Baltimore Orioles (1891)

Louis Winfred Hardie (August 24, 1864 in New York – March 5, 1929 in Oakland, California) was an American professional baseball catcher in Major League Baseball from 1884 to 1891. He played for the Chicago White Stockings, Philadelphia Quakers, Boston Beaneaters, and Baltimore Orioles.
