= John Fitzgerald (Boston Reds pitcher) =

American baseball player (1870–1921)

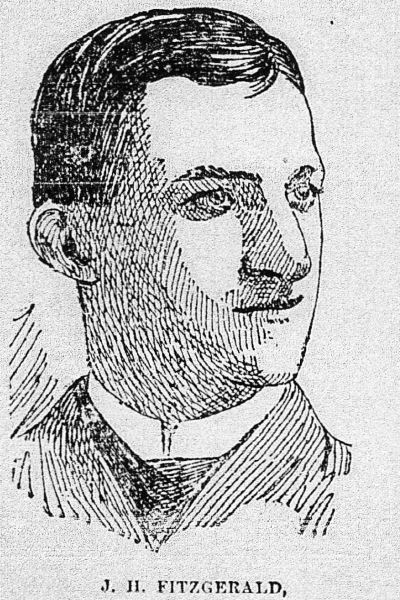
- Pitcher
- Born: May 30, 1870; Natick, Massachusetts, U.S.
- Died: March 31, 1921 (aged 50); Boston, Massachusetts, U.S.
- Batted: Unknown Threw: Unknown

MLB debut
- July 18, 1891, for the Boston Reds

Last MLB appearance
- October 5, 1891, for the Boston Reds

MLB statistics
- Win–loss record: 1–1
- Earned run average: 5.62
- Innings pitched: 32
- Stats at Baseball Reference

Teams
- Boston Reds (1891)

John H. Fitzgerald (May 30, 1870 – March 31, 1921) was an American Major League Baseball player who pitched one season in the majors with the 1891 Boston Reds. He pitched in a total of six games, started three, completed two of them. He struck out 16 batters in 32 innings pitched.
