= Bill Zies =

American baseball player (1867–1907)

- Catcher
- Born: June 16, 1867; Rock Island, Illinois, U.S.
- Died: April 16, 1907 (aged 39); Beardstown, Illinois, U.S.
- Batted: Left Threw: Unknown

MLB debut
- August 9, 1891, for the St. Louis Browns

Last MLB appearance
- August 10, 1891, for the St. Louis Browns

MLB statistics
- Games played: 2
- At bats: 3
- Hits: 1
- Stats at Baseball Reference

Former teams
- Monmouth Maple Cities (minor league) (1890)

Teams
- St. Louis Browns (1891)

William Zies (June 16, 1867 – April 16, 1907) was an American professional baseball catcher. He played two games in Major League Baseball in 1891 for the St. Louis Browns of the American Association. He had one hit in three at bats.

He earlier played for the minor league Monmouth Maple Cities (Illinois-Iowa League) in 1890.
