= 1891 Philadelphia Athletics season =

1891 Philadelphia Athletics
- League: American Association
- Ballpark: Forepaugh Park
- City: Philadelphia, Pennsylvania
- Record: 73–66 (.525)
- League place: 4th
- Owner: J. Earl Wagner
- Managers: Bill Sharsig, George Wood

The 1891 Philadelphia Athletics season was a season in American baseball. The team, which had played the 1890 season in the defunct Players' League, joined the American Association as a replacement for the previous version of the Philadelphia Athletics, which was expelled after the 1890 season.

The team finished with a 73–66 record and was fourth place in the AA. The league folded after the 1891 season; the team disbanded with it. It was reported that Athletics ownership earned a $5,000 profit on the season in addition to the rents they charged the Forepaugh and Barnum circuses for use of Forepaugh Park.

== Regular season ==
=== Season standings ===
American Association
Team	W	L	Pct.	GB	Home	Road
Boston Reds	93	42	.689	—	51‍–‍17	42‍–‍25
St. Louis Browns	85	51	.625	8½	52‍–‍21	33‍–‍30
Baltimore Orioles	71	64	.526	22	44‍–‍24	27‍–‍40
Philadelphia Athletics	73	66	.525	22	43‍–‍26	30‍–‍40
Milwaukee Brewers	21	15	.583	22½	16‍–‍5	5‍–‍10
Cincinnati Kelly's Killers	43	57	.430	32½	24‍–‍21	19‍–‍36
Columbus Solons	61	76	.445	33	33‍–‍29	28‍–‍47
Louisville Colonels	54	83	.394	40	39‍–‍32	15‍–‍51
Washington Statesmen	44	91	.326	49	28‍–‍40	16‍–‍51

=== Record vs. opponents ===
1891 American Association record Sources:
Team	BAL	BSR	CKE	COL	LOU	MIL	PHA	STL	WAS
Baltimore	—	8–12–1	7–5	12–7	14–6	3–3	9–10–2	7–12–1	11–9
Boston	12–8–1	—	8–5	15–5	14–3–2	5–2	13–7–1	8–10	18–2
Cincinnati	5–7	5–8	—	8–7	7–9	0–0	4–8	5–14–1	9–4–1
Columbus	7–12	5–15	7–8	—	12–8	0–5	9–11	9–11	12–6–1
Louisville	6–14	3–14–2	9–7	8–12	—	1–3	8–12	9–11	10–10
Milwaukee	3–3	2–5	0–0	5–0	3–1	—	3–5	1–0	4–1
Philadelphia	10–9–2	7–13–1	8–4	11–9	12–8	5–3	—	10–10	10–10–1
St. Louis	12–7–1	10–8	14–5–1	11–9	11–9	0–1	10–10	—	17–2–1
Washington	9–11	2–18	4–9–1	6–12–1	10–10	1–4	10–10–1	2–17–1	—

=== Roster ===
1891 Philadelphia Athletics
Roster
Pitchers: Sumner Bowman; Will Calihan; Ice Box Chamberlain; George Meakim; Mike Sullivan; Gus Weyhing	Catchers: Dave McKeough; Jocko Milligan; Infielders: Bill Clymer; Tommy Corcoran; Bill Hallman; Henry Larkin; Joe Mulvey	Outfielders: Ed Beecher; Pop Corkhill; Lave Cross; Pat Friel; Charles Matthews; Jack McGeachey; Jim McTamany; Ben Sanders; George Wood	Manager: Bill Sharsig; George Wood

== Player stats ==
=== Batting ===
==== Starters by position ====
Note: Pos = Position; G = Games played; AB = At bats; H = Hits; Avg. = Batting average; HR = Home runs; RBI = Runs batted in

Pos	Player	G	AB	H	Avg.	HR	RBI
C	Jocko Milligan	118	455	138	.303	11	106
1B	Henry Larkin	133	526	147	.279	10	93
2B	Bill Hallman	141	587	166	.283	6	69
SS	Tommy Corcoran	133	511	130	.254	7	71
3B	Joe Mulvey	113	453	115	.254	5	66
OF	Pop Corkhill	83	349	73	.209	0	31
OF	Jim McTamany	58	218	49	.225	3	21
OF	George Wood	132	528	163	.309	3	61

==== Other batters ====
Note: G = Games played; AB = At bats; H = Hits; Avg. = Batting average; HR = Home runs; RBI = Runs batted in

Player	G	AB	H	Avg.	HR	RBI
Lave Cross	110	402	121	.301	5	52
Jack McGeachey	50	201	46	.229	2	13
Ben Sanders	40	156	39	.250	1	19
Ed Beecher	16	71	15	.211	0	7
Dave McKeough	15	54	14	.259	0	3
Bill Clymer	3	11	0	.000	0	0
Pat Friel	2	8	2	.250	0	0
Charles Matthews	1	3	1	.333	0	0

=== Pitching ===
==== Starting pitchers ====
Note: G = Games pitched; IP = Innings pitched; W = Wins; L = Losses; ERA = Earned run average; SO = Strikeouts

Player	G	IP	W	L	ERA	SO
Gus Weyhing	52	450.0	31	20	3.18	219
Ice Box Chamberlain	49	405.2	22	23	4.22	204
Ben Sanders	19	145.0	11	5	3.79	40
Will Calihan	13	112.0	6	6	6.43	28
Sumner Bowman	8	68.0	2	5	3.44	22
George Meakim	6	35.0	1	4	6.94	13
Mike Sullivan	2	18.0	0	2	3.50	7
