= Jack Leiper (baseball) =

American baseball player (1867–1960)

- Pitcher
- Born: December 23, 1867; Chester, Pennsylvania, U.S.
- Died: August 23, 1960 (aged 92); West Goshen Township, Pennsylvania, U.S.
- Batted: Left Threw: Left

MLB debut
- September 4, 1891, for the Columbus Solons

Last MLB appearance
- October 4, 1891, for the Columbus Solons

MLB statistics
- Win–loss record: 2–2
- Earned run average: 5.40
- Strikeouts: 19
- Stats at Baseball Reference

Teams
- Columbus Solons (1891)

John Henry Thomas Leiper (December 23, 1867 – August 23, 1960) was an American professional baseball player who played for the Columbus Solons during the 1891 season.
