= Harry Mace =

American baseball player (1866–1930)

- Pitcher
- Born: August 1866; Washington, D.C., U.S.
- Died: April 26, 1930 (aged 63); Norfolk, Virginia, U.S.
- Batted: Unknown Threw: Right

MLB debut
- May 5, 1891, for the Washington Statesmen

Last MLB appearance
- May 13, 1891, for the Washington Statesmen

MLB statistics
- Win–loss record: 0–1
- Strikeouts: 3
- Earned run average: 7.31
- Stats at Baseball Reference

Teams
- Washington Statesmen (1891)

Harry F. Mace (August 1866 – April 26, 1930) was an American pitcher in Major League Baseball for the 1891 Washington Statesmen. He played in the minors from 1889–1895 and managed in 1902.
