= 1891 Columbus Solons season =

1891 Columbus Solons
- League: American Association
- Ballpark: Recreation Park
- City: Columbus, Ohio
- Record: 61–76 (.445)
- League place: 7th
- Manager: Gus Schmelz

The 1891 Columbus Solons baseball team finished with a 61–76 record, sixth place in the American Association. The team folded at the conclusion of the season.

== Regular season ==
=== Season standings ===
American Association
Team	W	L	Pct.	GB	Home	Road
Boston Reds	93	42	.689	—	51‍–‍17	42‍–‍25
St. Louis Browns	85	51	.625	8½	52‍–‍21	33‍–‍30
Baltimore Orioles	71	64	.526	22	44‍–‍24	27‍–‍40
Philadelphia Athletics	73	66	.525	22	43‍–‍26	30‍–‍40
Milwaukee Brewers	21	15	.583	22½	16‍–‍5	5‍–‍10
Cincinnati Kelly's Killers	43	57	.430	32½	24‍–‍21	19‍–‍36
Columbus Solons	61	76	.445	33	33‍–‍29	28‍–‍47
Louisville Colonels	54	83	.394	40	39‍–‍32	15‍–‍51
Washington Statesmen	44	91	.326	49	28‍–‍40	16‍–‍51

=== Record vs. opponents ===
1891 American Association record Sources:
Team	BAL	BSR	CKE	COL	LOU	MIL	PHA	STL	WAS
Baltimore	—	8–12–1	7–5	12–7	14–6	3–3	9–10–2	7–12–1	11–9
Boston	12–8–1	—	8–5	15–5	14–3–2	5–2	13–7–1	8–10	18–2
Cincinnati	5–7	5–8	—	8–7	7–9	0–0	4–8	5–14–1	9–4–1
Columbus	7–12	5–15	7–8	—	12–8	0–5	9–11	9–11	12–6–1
Louisville	6–14	3–14–2	9–7	8–12	—	1–3	8–12	9–11	10–10
Milwaukee	3–3	2–5	0–0	5–0	3–1	—	3–5	1–0	4–1
Philadelphia	10–9–2	7–13–1	8–4	11–9	12–8	5–3	—	10–10	10–10–1
St. Louis	12–7–1	10–8	14–5–1	11–9	11–9	0–1	10–10	—	17–2–1
Washington	9–11	2–18	4–9–1	6–12–1	10–10	1–4	10–10–1	2–17–1	—

=== Roster ===
1891 Columbus Solons
Roster
Pitchers: Ed Clark; Dad Clarke; John Dolan; Jack Easton; Hank Gastright; Phil Knell; Jack Leiper; John Lyston; Jim Sullivan	Catchers: Jim Donahue; Tom Dowse; Infielders: Elmer Cleveland; Jack Crooks; Jim Donnelly; Bill Kuehne; Mike Lehane; Tim O'Rourke; Bobby Wheelock	Outfielders: Charlie Duffee; Jim McTamany; Jack O'Connor; John Sneed; Larry Twitchell	Manager: Gus Schmelz

== Player stats ==
=== Batting ===
==== Starters by position ====
Note: Pos = Position; G = Games played; AB = At bats; H = Hits; Avg. = Batting average; HR = Home runs; RBI = Runs batted in

Pos	Player	G	AB	H	Avg.	HR	RBI
C	Jim Donahue	77	280	61	.218	0	35
1B	Mike Lehane	137	511	110	.215	1	52
2B	Jack Crooks	138	519	127	.245	0	46
SS	Bobby Wheelock	136	498	114	.229	0	39
3B	Bill Kuehne	68	261	56	.215	2	22
OF	Charlie Duffee	137	552	166	.301	10	90
OF	John Sneed	99	366	94	.257	1	61
OF	Jim McTamany	81	304	76	.250	3	35

==== Other batters ====
Note: G = Games played; AB = At bats; H = Hits; Avg. = Batting average; HR = Home runs; RBI = Runs batted in

Player	G	AB	H	Avg.	HR	RBI
Jack O'Connor	56	229	61	.266	0	37
Larry Twitchell	57	224	62	.277	2	35
Tom Dowse	55	201	45	.224	0	22
Tim O'Rourke	34	136	38	.279	0	12
Jim Donnelly	17	54	13	.241	0	9
Elmer Cleveland	12	41	7	.171	0	4

=== Pitching ===
==== Starting pitchers ====
Note: G = Games pitched; IP = Innings pitched; W = Wins; L = Losses; ERA = Earned run average; SO = Strikeouts

Player	G	IP	W	L	ERA	SO
Phil Knell	58	462.0	28	27	2.92	228
Hank Gastright	35	283.2	12	19	3.78	109
John Dolan	27	203.1	12	11	4.16	68
Jack Easton	20	150.1	5	12	4.43	65
Jack Leiper	6	45.0	2	2	5.40	19
Jim Sullivan	1	9.0	0	1	4.00	1

==== Other pitchers ====
Note: G = Games pitched; IP = Innings pitched; W = Wins; L = Losses; ERA = Earned run average; SO = Strikeouts

Player	G	IP	W	L	ERA	SO
Larry Twitchell	6	31.0	1	1	4.06	8
Dad Clarke	4	21.0	1	2	6.86	2

==== Relief pitchers ====
Note: G = Games pitched; W = Wins; L = Losses; SV = Saves; ERA = Earned run average; SO = Strikeouts

Player	G	W	L	SV	ERA	SO
Ed Clark	1	0	0	0	0.00	1
