= Pat Pettee =

American baseball player (1863–1934)

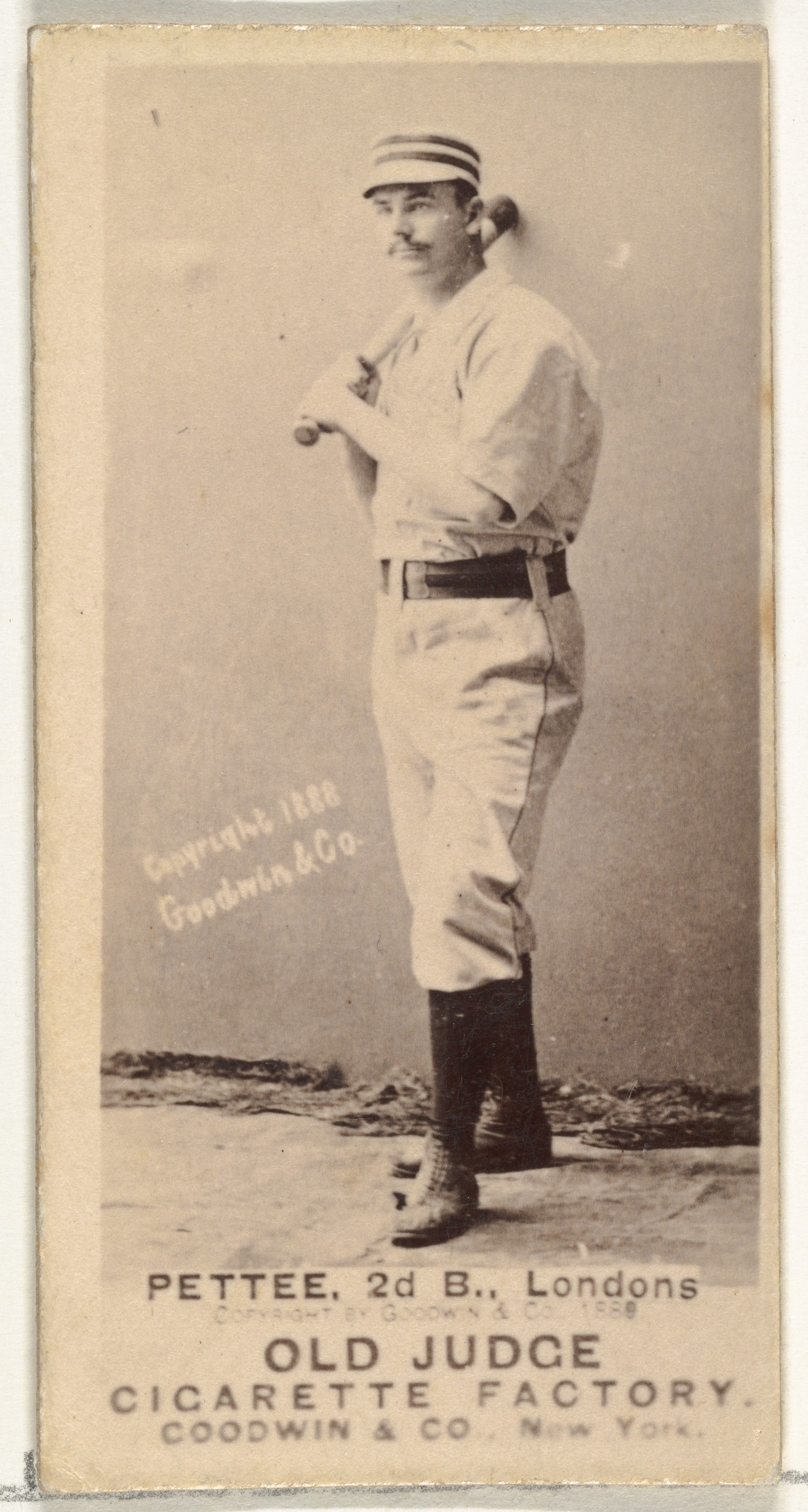
- Second baseman
- Born: January 10, 1863; Natick, Massachusetts, U.S.
- Died: October 9, 1934 (aged 71); Natick, Massachusetts, U.S.
- Batted: Right Threw: Right

MLB debut
- April 8, 1891, for the Louisville Colonels

Last MLB appearance
- April 14, 1891, for the Louisville Colonels

MLB statistics
- Batting average: .000
- Home runs: 0
- Runs scored: 0
- Stats at Baseball Reference

Teams
- Louisville Colonels (1891)

Patrick E. Pettee (January 10, 1863 – October 9, 1934) was an American second baseman in Major League Baseball in the 19th century. He played for the Louisville Colonels of the American Association in 1891. He played in the minor leagues from 1885 to 1896.

== Sources ==
- Career statistics from Baseball Reference · Baseball Reference (Minors) · Retrosheet · Baseball Almanac
