= John Doran (baseball) =

American baseball player (born 1867)

- Pitcher
- Born: 1867; Chicago, Illinois, U.S.
- Died: Unknown
- Batted: Unknown Threw: Left

MLB debut
- April 11, 1891, for the Louisville Colonels

Last MLB appearance
- June 1, 1891, for the Louisville Colonels

MLB statistics
- Win–loss record: 5–10
- Earned run average: 5.43
- Strikeouts: 55
- Stats at Baseball Reference

Teams
- Louisville Colonels (1891)

John F. Doran (born 1867) was an American Major League Baseball pitcher. He played in the majors for the Louisville Colonels of the American Association during the 1891 season. He remained active in the minor leagues through 1895.
