= Jocko Milligan =

American baseball player (1861–1923)

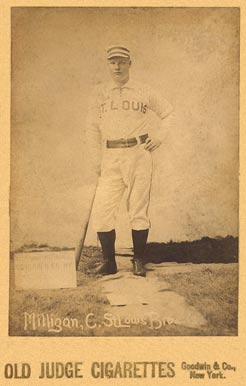
- Catcher / First baseman
- Born: August 8, 1861; Philadelphia, Pennsylvania, U.S.
- Died: August 29, 1923 (aged 62); Philadelphia, Pennsylvania, U.S.
- Batted: Right Threw: Right

MLB debut
- May 1, 1884, for the Philadelphia Athletics

Last MLB appearance
- September 26, 1893, for the New York Giants

MLB statistics
- Batting average: .286
- Home runs: 49
- Runs batted in: 497
- Stats at Baseball Reference

Teams
- Philadelphia Athletics (1884–1887); St. Louis Browns (1888–1889); Philadelphia Athletics (1890–1891); Washington Senators (1892); Baltimore Orioles (1893); New York Giants (1893)

John "Jocko" Milligan (August 8, 1861 – August 29, 1923) was an American professional baseball player who played catcher in Major League Baseball from 1884 to 1893.

== Biography ==
Milligan played for the Philadelphia Athletics, St. Louis Browns, Philadelphia Athletics, Washington Senators, Baltimore Orioles, and New York Giants.

In 772 games over ten seasons, Milligan posted a .286 batting average (848-for-2964) with 440 runs, 189 doubles, fifty triples, forty-nine home runs, 497 runs batted in, 210 bases on balls, .341 on-base percentage, and .433 slugging percentage.

== Death and interment ==
Milligan died on August 29, 1923, in Philadelphia, Pennsylvania and was interred at the Mount Moriah Cemetery.

== See also ==
- List of Major League Baseball annual doubles leaders
