= 1891 Milwaukee Brewers season =

1891 Milwaukee Brewers
- League: American Association
- Ballpark: Athletic Park
- City: Milwaukee
- Record: 21–15 (.583)
- Manager: Charlie Cushman

The Milwaukee Brewers of 1891 were an American professional baseball team. They were brought into the major-league American Association (AA) from the minor-league Western Association in August 1891 to replace the Cincinnati Kelly's Killers, who had ceased operations on August 17. In their only season as a major-league team, the Brewers finished with a record of 21–15 (.583), finishing with a better winning percentage than all but two teams in the AA--albeit with 100 fewer games played than the other teams. After the season, the AA folded, while the Brewers lasted one season in the Western League before they folded.

== Regular season ==
=== Season standings ===
American Association
Team	W	L	Pct.	GB	Home	Road
Boston Reds	93	42	.689	—	51‍–‍17	42‍–‍25
St. Louis Browns	85	51	.625	8½	52‍–‍21	33‍–‍30
Baltimore Orioles	71	64	.526	22	44‍–‍24	27‍–‍40
Philadelphia Athletics	73	66	.525	22	43‍–‍26	30‍–‍40
Milwaukee Brewers	21	15	.583	22½	16‍–‍5	5‍–‍10
Cincinnati Kelly's Killers	43	57	.430	32½	24‍–‍21	19‍–‍36
Columbus Solons	61	76	.445	33	33‍–‍29	28‍–‍47
Louisville Colonels	54	83	.394	40	39‍–‍32	15‍–‍51
Washington Statesmen	44	91	.326	49	28‍–‍40	16‍–‍51

=== Record vs. opponents ===
1891 American Association record Sources:
Team	BAL	BSR	CKE	COL	LOU	MIL	PHA	STL	WAS
Baltimore	—	8–12–1	7–5	12–7	14–6	3–3	9–10–2	7–12–1	11–9
Boston	12–8–1	—	8–5	15–5	14–3–2	5–2	13–7–1	8–10	18–2
Cincinnati	5–7	5–8	—	8–7	7–9	0–0	4–8	5–14–1	9–4–1
Columbus	7–12	5–15	7–8	—	12–8	0–5	9–11	9–11	12–6–1
Louisville	6–14	3–14–2	9–7	8–12	—	1–3	8–12	9–11	10–10
Milwaukee	3–3	2–5	0–0	5–0	3–1	—	3–5	1–0	4–1
Philadelphia	10–9–2	7–13–1	8–4	11–9	12–8	5–3	—	10–10	10–10–1
St. Louis	12–7–1	10–8	14–5–1	11–9	11–9	0–1	10–10	—	17–2–1
Washington	9–11	2–18	4–9–1	6–12–1	10–10	1–4	10–10–1	2–17–1	—

=== Roster ===
1891 Milwaukee Brewers
Roster
Pitchers: George Davies; Frank Dwyer; Jim Hughey; Frank Killen; Willard Mains	Catchers: John Grim; Farmer Vaughn; Infielders: Gus Alberts; Jim Canavan; Jack Carney; Bob Pettit; George Shoch	Outfielders: Eddie Burke; Abner Dalrymple; Howard Earl; Tom Letcher	Manager: Charlie Cushman

== Player stats ==
=== Batting ===
==== Starters by position ====
Note: Pos = Position; G = Games played; AB = At bats; H = Hits; Avg. = Batting average; HR = Home runs; RBI = Runs batted in

Pos	Player	G	AB	H	Avg.	HR	RBI
C	Farmer Vaughn	25	99	33	.333	0	9
1B	John Carney	31	110	33	.300	3	23
2B	Jim Canavan	35	142	38	.268	3	21
SS	George Shoch	34	127	40	.315	1	16
3B	Gus Alberts	12	41	4	.098	0	2
OF	Eddie Burke	35	144	34	.236	2	21
OF	Abner Dalrymple	32	135	42	.311	1	22
OF	Howard Earl	31	129	32	.248	1	17

==== Other batters ====
Note: G = Games played; AB = At bats; H = Hits; Avg. = Batting average; HR = Home runs; RBI = Runs batted in

Player	G	AB	H	Avg.	HR	RBI
John Grim	29	119	28	.235	1	14
Bob Pettit	21	80	14	.175	1	5
Tom Letcher	6	21	4	.190	0	2

=== Pitching ===
==== Starting pitchers ====
Note: G = Games pitched; IP = Innings pitched; W = Wins; L = Losses; ERA = Earned run average; SO = Strikeouts

Player	G	IP	W	L	ERA	SO
George Davies	12	102.0	7	5	2.65	61
Frank Killen	11	96.2	7	4	1.68	38
Frank Dwyer	10	86.0	6	4	2.20	27
Willard Mains	2	10.0	0	2	10.80	2

==== Other pitchers ====
Note: G = Games pitched; IP = Innings pitched; W = Wins; L = Losses; ERA = Earned run average; SO = Strikeouts

Player	G	IP	W	L	ERA	SO
Jim Hughey	2	15.0	1	0	3.00	9
