= Pete Lohman =

American baseball player (1864–1928)

- Catcher
- Born: October 21, 1864; Washington County, Minnesota, U.S.
- Died: November 21, 1928 (aged 64); Los Angeles, California, U.S.
- Batted: Right Threw: Right

MLB debut
- May 11, 1891, for the Washington Statesmen

Last MLB appearance
- July 20, 1891, for the Washington Statesmen

MLB statistics
- Batting average: .193
- Hits: 21
- Runs: 18
- Stats at Baseball Reference

Teams
- Washington Statesmen (1891)

George F. "Pete" Lohman (October 21, 1864 – November 21, 1928), was an American professional catcher in Major League Baseball for the 1891 Washington Statesmen. He played in the minor leagues through 1905 and also managed in the minor leagues in parts of six seasons.
