= Charles Matthews (baseball) =

American baseball player (1863–1926)

- Right fielder
- Born: March 11, 1863; Camden, New Jersey, U.S.
- Died: December 26, 1926 (aged 63); Camden, New Jersey, U.S.
- Batted: Unknown Threw: Unknown

MLB debut
- September 25, 1891, for the Philadelphia Athletics

Last MLB appearance
- September 25, 1891, for the Philadelphia Athletics

MLB statistics
- Games played: 1
- Hits: 1
- Batting average: .333
- Stats at Baseball Reference

Teams
- Philadelphia Athletics (1891)

Charles Matthews (March 11, 1863 – December 26, 1926) was an American Major League Baseball player who played in one Major League game for the 1891 Philadelphia Athletics of the American Association.

== Biography ==
In his only game, Matthews was the starting right fielder for the Athletics on September 25, 1891, in a home game against the Washington Statesmen. In five plate appearances he went 1-for-3 (a single), was hit by pitches twice, and scored one run, helping his team to a 13-4 victory. Elton "Icebox" Chamberlain was the starter and winner for Philadelphia.
