= Dixie Carroll =

American baseball player (1891–1984)

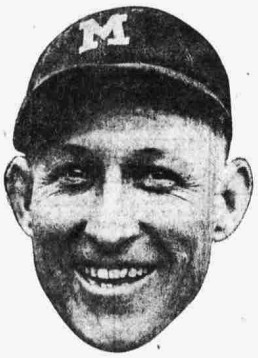
- Carroll with the Memphis Chicks in 1920
- Outfielder
- Born: May 19, 1891; Paducah, Kentucky, U.S.
- Died: October 13, 1984 (aged 93); Jacksonville, Florida, U.S.
- Batted: Left Threw: Right

MLB debut
- September 12, 1919, for the Boston Braves

Last MLB appearance
- September 27, 1919, for the Boston Braves

MLB statistics
- Batting average: .265
- Home runs: 0
- Runs batted in: 7
- Stats at Baseball Reference

Dorsey Lee "Dixie" Carroll (May 19, 1891 – October 13, 1984) is an American former Major League Baseball outfielder who played for the Boston Braves for sixteen days in 1919.
