= Frank Quinlan =

American baseball player (1869–1904)

- Catcher/Left fielder
- Born: March 8, 1869; Marlborough, Massachusetts, U.S.
- Died: May 4, 1904 (aged 35); Brockton, Massachusetts, U.S.
- Batted: Unknown Threw: Unknown

MLB debut
- October 5, 1891, for the Boston Reds

Last MLB appearance
- October 5, 1891, for the Boston Reds

MLB statistics
- Batting average: .000
- At bats: 5
- Stats at Baseball Reference

Teams
- Boston Reds (1891)

Francis Patrick Quinlan (March 9, 1869 – May 4, 1904) was an American Major League Baseball player who played for one season. He played two games for the Boston Reds for two games on October 5, 1891 during the Reds' American Association championship. During the doubleheader, he played one game as a catcher and another game as a left fielder.
