= Jersey Bakley =

American baseball player (1864–1915)

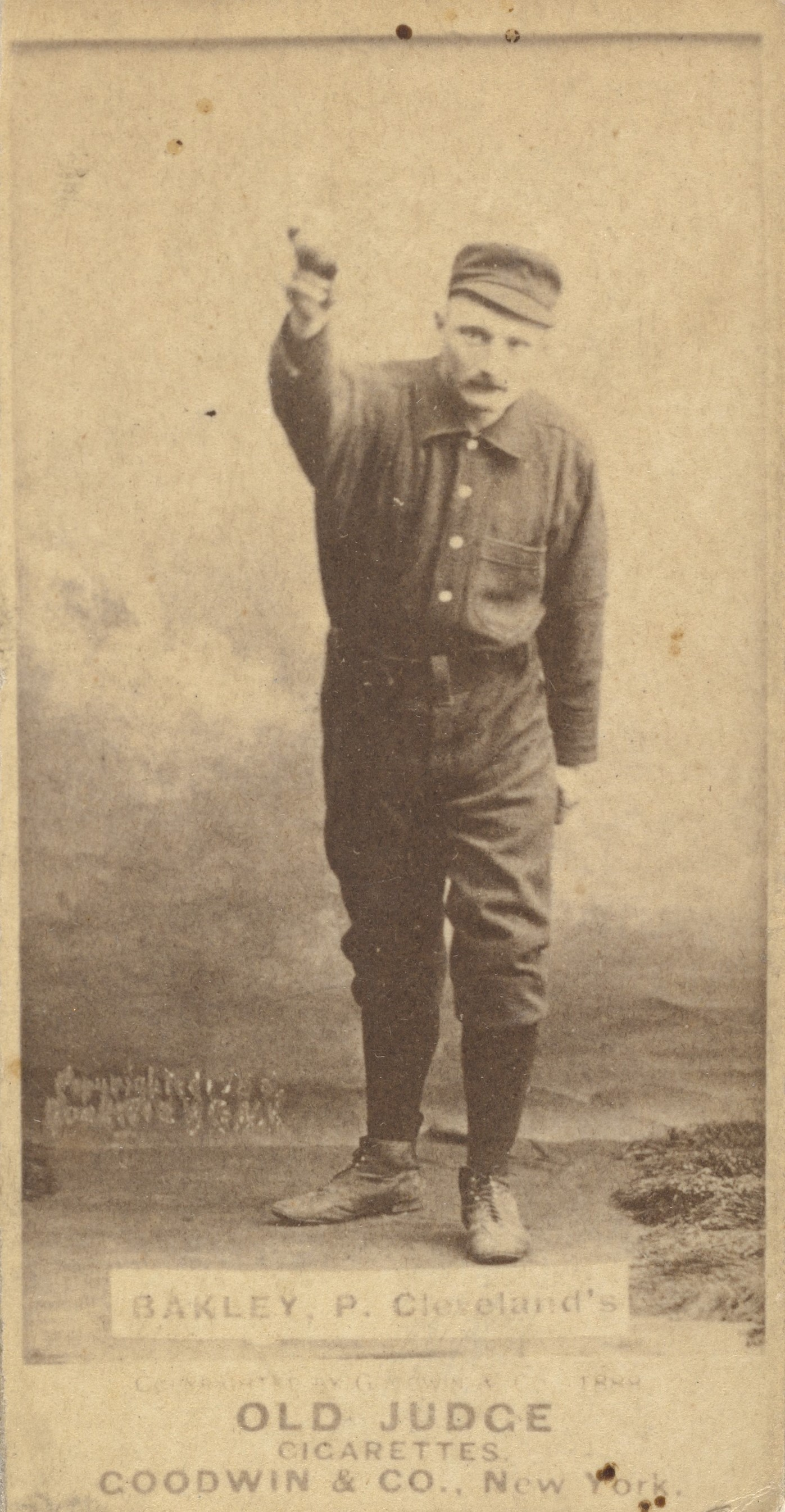
- 1888 baseball card of Bakley
- Pitcher
- Born: April 17, 1864; Blackwood, New Jersey, U.S.
- Died: February 17, 1915 (aged 50); Philadelphia, Pennsylvania, U.S.
- Batted: Right Threw: Right

MLB debut
- May 11, 1883, for the Philadelphia Athletics

Last MLB appearance
- August 20, 1891, for the Baltimore Orioles

MLB statistics
- Win–loss record: 76–125
- Earned run average: 3.66
- Strikeouts: 669
- Stats at Baseball Reference

Teams
- Philadelphia Athletics (1883); Philadelphia Keystones (1884); Wilmington Quicksteps (1884); Kansas City Cowboys (1884); Cleveland Blues (1888); Cleveland Spiders (1889); Cleveland Infants (1890); Washington Statesmen (1891); Baltimore Orioles (1891)

Edward Enoch "Jersey" Bakley (April 17, 1864 – February 17, 1915) was an American Major League Baseball pitcher in the late 19th century. He pitched for nine different teams in six years of play from 1883 to 1891. His last name was sometimes spelled "Bakely" or "Bakeley". He was 5 feet 8 inches (1.73 m) tall and weighed 170 pounds (77 kg).

In 1884, Bakley recorded the worst wins above replacement (WAR) season by any pitcher in professional baseball history, finishing with -5.3 WAR. He appeared in 46 games, starting 45 of them, for the Philadelphia Keystones, Wilmington Quicksteps, and Kansas City Cowboys, all teams in the Union Association. That season, he posted a win–loss record of 16–30, a 4.29 earned run average, and 226 strikeouts across 394 2/3 innings pitched.

== Career ==
Born in the Blackwood section of Gloucester Township, New Jersey, Bakley made his major league debut in 1883 at the age of 19 for the Philadelphia Athletics of the American Association. He went 5–3 for the eventual pennant winners.

Bakley spent the next several years in the minors before returning to the majors in 1888 and was arguably one of the better pitchers in the country in 1888 and 1889. His 532.2 innings pitched in 1888 ranked second in the AA, and he went 25–33 with a 2.97 earned run average. The next season, his 2.96 ERA was the second-best in the National League.

On September 3, 1890, Bakley gave up Harry Stovey's 100th homer, which was the first time that milestone had ever been reached.

Bakley finished his major league career with a 76–125 record, a 3.66 ERA, and 669 strikeouts in 1,782.2 innings pitched.

Bakley served as a first base umpire twice, both times while playing for Cleveland teams; first in August 1888 during a game in Kansas City, and again in July 1890 during a game in Boston where umpire Harry Leach had been knocked unconscious in the prior day's game.
