= 1891 Major League Baseball season =

1891 MLB season
- League: American Association (AA); National League (NL)
- Sport: Baseball
- Duration: April 8 – October 6, 1891 (AA); April 22 – October 3, 1891 (NL)
- Games: 140
- Teams: 17 (8 active per league, 9 AA total)

Pennant winner
- AA champions: Boston Reds
- AA runners-up: St. Louis Browns
- NL champions: Boston Beaneaters
- NL runners-up: Chicago Colts

MLB seasons
- ← 1890 1892 →

Locations of teams for the 1891 American Association season
American Association
Locations of teams for the 1891 National League season
National League

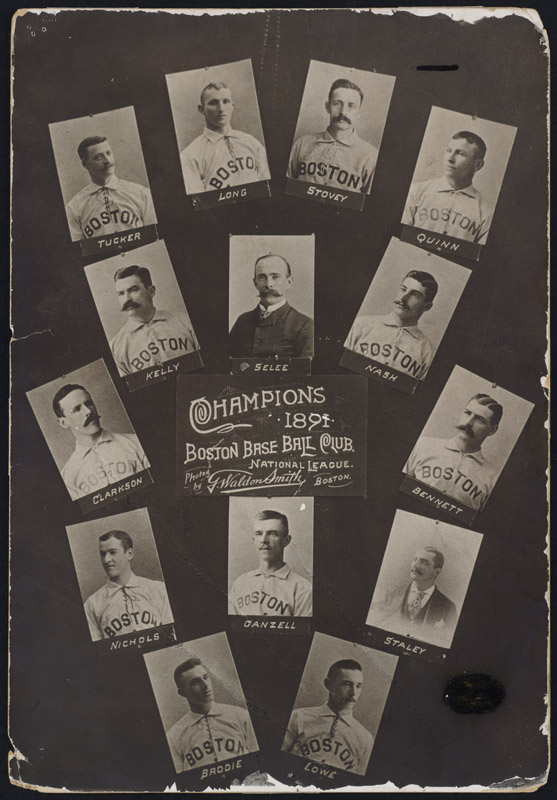
Boston National League Team, 1891

The 1891 major league baseball season was contested from April 8 through October 6, 1891. It was the final season for the American Association (AA), with the Boston Reds winning the AA pennant. In the National League (NL), in operation since 1876, the Boston Beaneaters won the NL pennant. There was no postseason. The Reds, following the 1890 Brooklyn Bridegrooms consecutive pennant wins 1889–1890 in different leagues, also followed such a feat, winning the since folded Players' League's 1890 pennant and becoming the second and last team to win consecutive pennants in different leagues.

This was the first season since 1883 which saw no postseason, due to a breakdown in relations between the American Association and National League prior to the start of the season. The next championship series would take place the following season in a unique split season format, due to negotiations during the merger of the AA into the NL.

The 1891 season saw the aftermath of the single-season Players' League disbanding during the offseason, with most teams either folding or merging with existing American Association and National League teams; the Boston Reds and Philadelphia Athletics would join the AA for the 1891 season, with the latter replacing the financially struggling original AA Philadelphia Athletics.

The unstable American Association would see that 1891 would be its final season, before merging into the National League the following season; the four clubs that would continue on were the Baltimore Orioles, Louisville Colonels, St. Louis Browns, and Washington Statesmen. The other four AA clubs, the Boston Reds, Columbus Solons, Milwaukee Brewers, and Philadelphia Athletics), saw their owners paid $135,000 (equivalent to $4,837,500 in 2025) and their players dispersed to the surviving twelve clubs.

== Schedule ==
The 1891 schedule consisted of 140 games for all teams in the American Association and National League, each of which had eight active teams (the Milwaukee Brewers would finish the Cincinnati Kelly's Killers' schedule once they folded following their last game on August 16). Each team was scheduled to play 20 games against the other seven teams of their respective league. This continued the format put in place by the American Association since the 1886 season and by the National League since the 1888 season, and was the last season this format would be used until the National League contracted from twelve to eight teams in 1900.

American Association Opening Day took place on April 8 featuring all eight teams, while National League Opening Day would not take place for another two weeks on April 22, also featuring all eight teams. The American Association would see its final day of the regular season on October 6, while the National would see its final day of the season on October 3.

== Rule changes ==
The 1891 season saw the following rule changes:

- Rule 28 was amended so that now, substituting players could now happen at any point in the game.
- Large, padded mitts were allowed for catchers.
- Rule 48, regarding baserunning, was changed to allow a baserunner to prepare to round first base towards second on a hit to the outfield. Previously, a baserunner was to stay within a three-foot space demarcated by the baseline and a parallel line that ran halfway from home plate to first base.

== Teams ==
An asterisk (*) denotes the ballpark a team played the minority of their home games at
A dagger (†) denotes a team that folded mid-season
A double dagger (‡) denotes a team joined mid-season

League	Team	City	Ballpark	Capacity	Manager
American Association	Baltimore Orioles	Baltimore, Maryland	Union Park	6,500	Billy Barnie
American Association	Baltimore Orioles	Baltimore, Maryland	Oriole Park*	7,000*	Billy Barnie
American Association	Boston Reds	Boston, Massachusetts	Congress Street Grounds	14,000	Arthur Irwin
American Association	Cincinnati Kelly's Killers†	Cincinnati, Ohio	Pendleton Park	5,000	King Kelly
American Association	Columbus Solons	Columbus, Ohio	Recreation Park	6,500	Gus Schmelz
American Association	Louisville Colonels	Louisville, Kentucky	Eclipse Park	5,860	Jack Chapman
American Association	Milwaukee Brewers‡	Milwaukee, Wisconsin	Brewer Field	10,000	Charlie Cushman
American Association	Philadelphia Athletics	Philadelphia, Pennsylvania	Forepaugh Park	5,000	Bill Sharsig
American Association	Philadelphia Athletics	Philadelphia, Pennsylvania	Forepaugh Park	5,000	George Wood
American Association	St. Louis Browns	St. Louis, Missouri	Sportsman's Park	12,000	Charles Comiskey
American Association	Washington Statesmen	Washington, D.C.	Boundary Field	6,500	Sam Trott
American Association	Washington Statesmen	Washington, D.C.	Boundary Field	6,500	Pop Snyder
American Association	Washington Statesmen	Washington, D.C.	Boundary Field	6,500	Dan Shannon
American Association	Washington Statesmen	Washington, D.C.	Boundary Field	6,500	Sandy Griffin
National League	Boston Beaneaters	Boston, Massachusetts	South End Grounds	6,800	Frank Selee
National League	Brooklyn Grooms	Brooklyn, New York	Eastern Park	12,000	John Montgomery Ward
National League	Chicago Colts	Chicago, Illinois	West Side Park*	6,000*	Cap Anson
National League	Chicago Colts	Chicago, Illinois	South Side Park	6,450	Cap Anson
National League	Cincinnati Reds	Cincinnati, Ohio	League Park (Cincinnati)	3,000	Tom Loftus
National League	Cleveland Spiders	Cleveland, Ohio	League Park (Cleveland)	9,000	Robert Leadley
National League	Cleveland Spiders	Cleveland, Ohio	League Park (Cleveland)	9,000	Patsy Tebeau
National League	New York Giants	New York, New York	Polo Grounds	16,000	Jim Mutrie
National League	Philadelphia Phillies	Philadelphia, Pennsylvania	Philadelphia Base Ball Grounds	12,500	Harry Wright
National League	Pittsburgh Pirates	Allegheny, Pennsylvania	Exposition Park	6,500	Ned Hanlon
National League	Pittsburgh Pirates	Allegheny, Pennsylvania	Exposition Park	6,500	Bill McGunnigle

=== Neutral site game ===
The Milwaukee Brewers hosted a neutral site game in Minneapolis, Minnesota against the Columbus Solons.

Team	City	Ballpark	Capacity	Games played
Milwaukee Brewers	Minneapolis, Minnesota	Athletic Park	Unknown	1

1. In today's New York, New York.
2. In today's Pittsburgh, Pennsylvania.

== Standings ==
=== American Association ===
American Association
Team	W	L	Pct.	GB	Home	Road
Boston Reds	93	42	.689	—	51‍–‍17	42‍–‍25
St. Louis Browns	85	51	.625	8½	52‍–‍21	33‍–‍30
Baltimore Orioles	71	64	.526	22	44‍–‍24	27‍–‍40
Philadelphia Athletics	73	66	.525	22	43‍–‍26	30‍–‍40
Milwaukee Brewers	21	15	.583	22½	16‍–‍5	5‍–‍10
Cincinnati Kelly's Killers	43	57	.430	32½	24‍–‍21	19‍–‍36
Columbus Solons	61	76	.445	33	33‍–‍29	28‍–‍47
Louisville Colonels	54	83	.394	40	39‍–‍32	15‍–‍51
Washington Statesmen	44	91	.326	49	28‍–‍40	16‍–‍51

=== National League ===
National League
Team	W	L	Pct.	GB	Home	Road
Boston Beaneaters	87	51	.630	—	51‍–‍20	36‍–‍31
Chicago Colts	82	53	.607	3½	43‍–‍22	39‍–‍31
New York Giants	71	61	.538	13	39‍–‍28	32‍–‍33
Philadelphia Phillies	68	69	.496	18½	35‍–‍34	33‍–‍35
Cleveland Spiders	65	74	.468	22½	40‍–‍28	25‍–‍46
Brooklyn Grooms	61	76	.445	25½	41‍–‍31	20‍–‍45
Cincinnati Reds	56	81	.409	30½	26‍–‍41	30‍–‍40
Pittsburgh Pirates	55	80	.407	30½	32‍–‍34	23‍–‍46

=== Tie games ===
19 tie games (12 in AA, 7 in NL), which are not factored into winning percentage or games behind (and were often replayed again), occurred throughout the season.

==== American Association ====
- Baltimore Orioles, 4
- Boston Reds, 4
- Cincinnati Kelly's Killers, 2
- Columbus Solons, 1
- Louisville Colonels, 2
- Philadelphia Athletics, 4
- St. Louis Browns, 3
- Washington Statesmen, 4

==== National League ====
- Boston Beaneaters, 2
- Chicago Colts, 2
- Cincinnati Reds, 1
- Cleveland Spiders, 2
- New York Giants, 4
- Philadelphia Phillies, 1
- Pittsburgh Pirates, 2

== Managerial changes ==
=== Off-season ===
Team	Former Manager	New Manager
Boston Reds	King Kelly	Arthur Irwin
Brooklyn Grooms	Bill McGunnigle	John Montgomery Ward
Brooklyn Ward's Wonders	John Montgomery Ward	Team folded
Buffalo Bisons	Jay Faatz	Team folded
Chicago Pirates	Charles Comiskey	Team folded
Cleveland Infants	Patsy Tebeau	Team folded
Columbus Solons	Pat Sullivan	Gus Schmelz
New York Giants (PL)	Buck Ewing	Team folded
Philadelphia Athletics (original AA team)	Bill Sharsig	Team folded
Philadelphia Athletics (formerly PL team)	Charlie Buffinton	Bill Sharsig
Philadelphia Phillies	Bob Allen	Harry Wright
Pittsburgh Burghers	Ned Hanlon	Team folded
Pittsburgh Pirates	Guy Hecker	Ned Hanlon
Rochester Broncos	Patrick Powers	Team transferred to minor league Western League
St. Louis Browns	Joe Gerhardt	Charles Comiskey
Syracuse Stars	Wallace Fessenden	Team folded
Toledo Maumees	Charlie Morton	Team folded

=== In-season ===
Team	Former Manager	New Manager
Cincinnati Kelly's Killers	King Kelly	Team folded
Cleveland Spiders	Robert Leadley	Patsy Tebeau
Milwaukee Brewers	Team transferred from minor league Western Association	Charlie Cushman
Philadelphia Athletics	Bill Sharsig	George Wood
Pittsburgh Pirates	Ned Hanlon	Bill McGunnigle
Washington Statesmen	Sam Trott	Pop Snyder
Washington Statesmen	Pop Snyder	Dan Shannon
Washington Statesmen	Dan Shannon	Sandy Griffin

== League leaders ==
Any team shown in small text indicates a previous team a player was on during the season.
Any team shown in italics indicates a team a player was on from a different league. Any stat from said different league is not calculated to determine the league leader.

=== American Association ===
Hitting leaders
Stat	Player	Total
AVG	Dan Brouthers (BSR)	.350
OPS	Dan Brouthers (BSR)	.983
HR	Duke Farrell (BSR)	12
RBI	Hugh Duffy (BSR); Duke Farrell (BSR)	110
R	Tom Brown (BSR)	177
H	Tom Brown (BSR)	189
SB	Tom Brown (BSR)	106

Pitching leaders
Stat	Player	Total
W	Sadie McMahon (BAL)	35
L	Kid Carsey (WAS)	37
ERA	Ed Crane (CIN/CKE)	2.45
K	Jack Stivetts (STL)	259
IP	Sadie McMahon (BAL)	503.0
SV	Joe Neale (STL)	3
WHIP	Charlie Buffinton (BSR)	1.163

=== National League ===
Hitting leaders
Stat	Player	Total
AVG	Billy Hamilton (PHI)	.340
OPS	Mike Tiernan (NYG)	.882
HR	Harry Stovey (BSN); Mike Tiernan (NYG)	16
RBI	Cap Anson (CHI)	120
R	Billy Hamilton (PHI)	141
H	Billy Hamilton (PHI)	179
SB	Billy Hamilton (PHI)	111

Pitching leaders
Stat	Player	Total
W	Bill Hutchinson (CHI)	44
L	Silver King (PIT)	29
ERA	John Ewing (NYG)	2.27
K	Amos Rusie (NYG)	337
IP	Bill Hutchinson (CHI)	561.0
SV	John Clarkson (BSN); Kid Nichols (BSN)	3
WHIP	Harry Staley (BSN/PIT)	1.213

== Milestones ==
=== Batters ===
==== Cycles ====
- Jimmy Ryan (CHI):
  - Ryan hit for his second cycle and second in franchise history, on July 1 against the Cleveland Spiders.
- Abner Dalrymple (MIL):
  - Dalrymple hit for his first cycle and first in franchise history, on September 12 against the Washington Statesmen.

==== Other batting accomplishments ====
- Arlie Latham (CIN):
  - Recorded his 500th career stolen base, becoming the first player to reach this mark. It is unknown what day this stolen base occurred.

=== Pitchers ===
==== No-hitters ====
- Tom Lovett (BRO):
  - Lovett threw his first career no-hitter and the fourth no-hitter in franchise history, by defeating the New York Giants 4–0 on June 22. Lovett walked three and struck out four.
- Amos Rusie (NYG):
  - Rusie threw his first career no-hitter and the first no-hitter in franchise history, by defeating the Brooklyn Grooms 6–0 on July 31. He is the youngest player to accomplish such a feat in major league history. Rusie walked seven and struck out four.
- Ted Breitenstein (STL):
  - The first player to accomplish this feat, Breitenstein threw his first career no-hitter in his first major league appearance. Breitenstein also threw the first no-hitter in franchise history, by defeating the Louisville Colonels 8–0 in game one of a doubleheader on October 4. Breitenstein walked one and struck out four.

==== Other pitching accomplishments ====
- Charles Radbourn (CIN):
  - Became the fourth member of the 300-win club, defeating the Boston Beaneaters on June 2, winning 10–8.

== Home field attendance ==
Only records for National League teams are available.

Team name	Wins	%±	Home attendance	%±	Per game
Philadelphia Phillies	68	−12.8%	217,282	46.4%	3,149
New York Giants	71	12.7%	210,568	247.1%	3,052
Boston Beaneaters	87	14.5%	184,472	25.0%	2,527
Brooklyn Grooms	61	−29.1%	181,477	49.5%	2,521
Chicago Colts	82	−1.2%	181,431	76.9%	2,708
Cleveland Spiders	65	47.7%	132,000	178.0%	1,913
Pittsburgh Pirates	55	139.1%	128,000	696.8%	1,939
Cincinnati Reds	56	−27.3%	97,500	−26.1%	1,455

== Venues ==
The 1891 season saw five teams relocate to new ballparks, many of which were ballparks of the single-season Players' League the previous season:

- The Baltimore Orioles leave Oriole Park (where they played for eight seasons) and move to Union Park, where they would go on to play for nine seasons until they folded, following the conclusion of the 1899 season.
- The Brooklyn Grooms leave Washington Park (where they played for seven seasons) and move to Eastern Park, the former home of the Players' League Brooklyn Ward's Wonders, where they would go on to play for seven seasons through 1897.
- The Cleveland Spiders leave National League Park (where they played for four seasons) and move to League Park, where they would go on to play for nine seasons until they folded, following the conclusion of the 1899 season.
- The New York Giants leave the second iteration of the Polo Grounds (where they played for two seasons) and move to the adjacent third iteration of the Polo Grounds, the former home of the Players' League New York Giants, where they would go on to play for 67 seasons through 1957.
- The Pittsburgh Pirates leave Recreation Park (where they played for seven seasons) and return to the Exposition Park site, playing at its third iteration, the former home of the Players' League Pittsburgh Burghers, where they would go on to play for 19 seasons midway through 1909.

The Chicago Colts begin playing at South Side Park, splitting their season from West Side Park. They would play their final game at West Side Park on October 2 against the Cincinnati Reds, permanently moving into South Side Park for the start of the 1892 season.

American Park, the home of the Cincinnati Reds, is renamed to League Park.

After the Cincinnati Outlaw Reds folded mid-season, the Milwaukee Brewers withdrew from the Western League as a replacement team, playing at Brewer Field. The team plays one of their 21 home games at a neutral site in Athletic Park in Minneapolis, Minnesota.

== See also ==
- 1891 in baseball (Events, Births, Deaths)
