= Tom Cotter (baseball) =

American baseball player (1866–1906)

- Catcher
- Born: September 30, 1866; Waltham, Massachusetts, U.S.
- Died: November 22, 1906 (aged 40); Brookline, Massachusetts, U.S.
- Batted: Right Threw: Right

MLB debut
- September 3, 1891, for the Boston Reds

Last MLB appearance
- October 5, 1891, for the Boston Reds

MLB statistics
- Batting average: .250
- Hits: 3
- Stats at Baseball Reference

Teams
- Boston Reds (1891)

Thomas Benedict Cotter (September 30, 1866 – November 22, 1906) was an American Major League Baseball catcher who played for one season. He played for the Boston Reds in six games in 1891, helping lead the Reds to the American Association title.
