= Warren Fitzgerald (baseball) =

American baseball player (1868–1930)

- Pitcher
- Born: April 1868; Pennsylvania, U.S.
- Died: November 7, 1930 (aged 62); Phoenix, Arizona, U.S.
- Batted: Unknown Threw: Left

MLB debut
- June 4, 1891, for the Louisville Colonels

Last MLB appearance
- June 8, 1892, for the Louisville Colonels

MLB statistics
- Win–loss record: 15–20
- Earned run average: 3.44
- Strikeouts: 113
- Stats at Baseball Reference

Teams
- Louisville Colonels (1891–1892)

Warren Bartholomew Fitzgerald (April 1868 – November 7, 1930) was an American Major League Baseball pitcher. He played in the majors for the Louisville Colonels during the 1891 and 1892 seasons.
