= Tom Hart (baseball) =

American baseball player (1869–1939)

- Catcher/Outfielder
- Born: June 15, 1869; Canaan, New York, U.S.
- Died: September 17, 1939 (aged 70); Gardner, Massachusetts, U.S.
- Batted: Unknown Threw: Unknown

MLB debut
- April 15, 1891, for the Washington Statesmen

Last MLB appearance
- May 7, 1891, for the Washington Statesmen

MLB statistics
- Batting average: .125
- Hits: 3
- Runs: 1
- Stats at Baseball Reference

Teams
- Washington Statesmen (1891)

Thomas Henry Hart (June 15, 1869 – September 17, 1939), nicknamed "Bushy", was an American professional baseball player who played catcher and outfielder in the Major Leagues for the 1891 Washington Statesmen.
