= 1891 in baseball =

The following are the baseball events of the year 1891 throughout the world.

== Champions ==
- National League: Boston Beaneaters
- American Association: Boston Reds

World Series: Boston (NL) declined to meet Boston (AA)

== Statistical leaders ==
	American Association		National League	
Stat	Player	Total	Player	Total
AVG	Dan Brouthers (BSR)	.350	Billy Hamilton (PHI)	.340
HR	Duke Farrell (BSR)	12	Harry Stovey (BSN); Mike Tiernan (NYG)	16
RBI	Hugh Duffy (BSR); Duke Farrell (BSR)	110	Cap Anson (CHI)	120
W	Sadie McMahon (BAL)	35	Bill Hutchinson (CHI)	44
ERA	Ed Crane (CKE)	2.45	John Ewing (NYG)	2.27
K	Jack Stivetts (STL)	259	Amos Rusie (NYG)	337

== Major league baseball final standings ==
=== American Association final standings ===
American Association
Team	W	L	Pct.	GB	Home	Road
Boston Reds	93	42	.689	—	51‍–‍17	42‍–‍25
St. Louis Browns	85	51	.625	8½	52‍–‍21	33‍–‍30
Baltimore Orioles	71	64	.526	22	44‍–‍24	27‍–‍40
Philadelphia Athletics	73	66	.525	22	43‍–‍26	30‍–‍40
Milwaukee Brewers	21	15	.583	22½	16‍–‍5	5‍–‍10
Cincinnati Kelly's Killers	43	57	.430	32½	24‍–‍21	19‍–‍36
Columbus Solons	61	76	.445	33	33‍–‍29	28‍–‍47
Louisville Colonels	54	83	.394	40	39‍–‍32	15‍–‍51
Washington Statesmen	44	91	.326	49	28‍–‍40	16‍–‍51

Locations of teams for the 1891 American Association season
American Association

=== National League final standings ===
National League
Team	W	L	Pct.	GB	Home	Road
Boston Beaneaters	87	51	.630	—	51‍–‍20	36‍–‍31
Chicago Colts	82	53	.607	3½	43‍–‍22	39‍–‍31
New York Giants	71	61	.538	13	39‍–‍28	32‍–‍33
Philadelphia Phillies	68	69	.496	18½	35‍–‍34	33‍–‍35
Cleveland Spiders	65	74	.468	22½	40‍–‍28	25‍–‍46
Brooklyn Grooms	61	76	.445	25½	41‍–‍31	20‍–‍45
Cincinnati Reds	56	81	.409	30½	26‍–‍41	30‍–‍40
Pittsburgh Pirates	55	80	.407	30½	32‍–‍34	23‍–‍46

Locations of teams for the 1891 National League season
National League

== Notable seasons ==
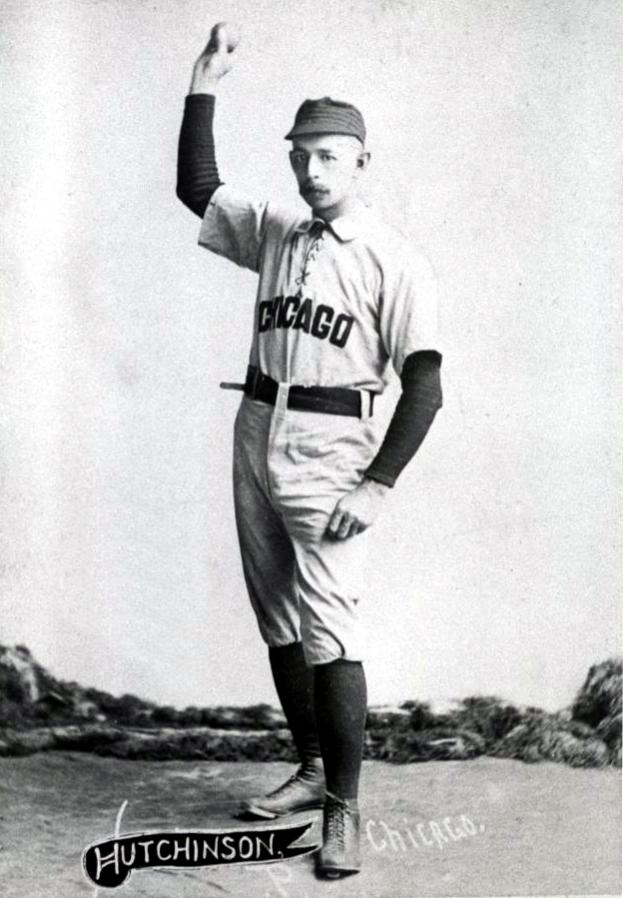
Bill Hutchison

- Philadelphia Phillies left fielder Billy Hamilton leads the NL with 179 hits, 111 stolen bases, 141 runs scored, and a .340 batting average. His .874 OPS and 155 OPS+ both rank second in the league.
- Chicago Colts pitcher Bill Hutchison has a record of 44–19 and leads the NL with 561 innings pitched and 44 wins. His 261 strikeouts rank second in the league. He has a 2.81 earned run average and a 123 ERA+.

== Events ==
=== January–March ===
- January 16 - An agreement is signed between the National League, American Association, and Western Association which creates a three man panel to settle any and all disputes between the three leagues. The agreement occurs two days after the National League allowed the American Association to place a team in Boston, a move the NL's Boston Beaneaters opposed.
- January 30 - The Boston Reds purchase the contract of second baseman Cupid Childs from the Syracuse Stars for $2,000.
- February 1 - The New York Giants sell the contract of Jesse Burkett to the Cleveland Spiders
- February 6 – The New York Giants' salary list is leaked to the press. It shows a total player payroll of $54,600 with Buck Ewing's $5,500 salary topping the scale.

=== April–June ===
- April 11 – Clark Griffith‚ 21 years old‚ makes his Major League debut‚ pitching for the St. Louis Browns to a 13–5 victory over the Cincinnati Kelly's Killers. After spending much of 1892 and 1893 in the minor leagues‚ Griffith will return to remain active in the majors as a pitcher‚ manager‚ and club owner until his death in 1955.
- April 22 – In the first game at the third Polo Grounds, Boston beats the New York Giants, 4–3.
- May 1 – Cleveland's League Park opens with 10,000 fans to see pitcher Cy Young beat Cincinnati, 12–3.
- May 14 – Charles Radbourn of the Cincinnati Reds records his 300th career win.
- May 17 - Hughie Jennings is signed by Louisville Colonels
- May 22 – At Cincinnati's League Park, Mickey Welch of the New York Giants hits into a game-ending triple play. Batting with the bases loaded in the ninth inning, Welch lines one to shortstop Germany Smith, who catches the ball and tosses it to second baseman, Bid McPhee, who tags the runner caught off second, Charley Bassett. McPhee then relay the ball to first baseman, John Reilly, who toes the sack to retire the runner, Artie Clarke, who was running between bases. The Reds won 8–3.
- June 1 - Fred Dunlap is released by the Washington Statesmen.
- June 22 – Tom Lovett throws a no-hitter as the Brooklyn Grooms defeat the New York Giants, 4–0.
- June 30 - The Cincinnati Reds sign former batting champion Pete Browning.

=== July–September ===
- July 1 – Chicago Colts outfielder Jimmy Ryan hits for the cycle in a 9–3 win over the Cleveland Spiders. It's the second time in Ryan's career that he has hit for the cycle.
- July 31 – New York Giants pitcher Amos Rusie no-hits the Brooklyn Grooms 6–0, on 8 walks and 4 K's. At 20 years and 2 months he is the youngest pitcher to toss a no-hitter.
- August 26 – John McGraw debuts with the Baltimore Orioles in the AA. He plays shortstop, makes an error, and he has a hit as the Orioles defeat the Columbus Buckeyes, 6–5.
- September 4 – Responding to writers who claim it's time for him to quit, Chicago's 39-year-old player-manager Cap Anson wears a false white beard against Boston. It doesn't help him at the plate – he is hitless in 3 at-bats. The White Stockings beat Boston, 5–3.
- September 12 – Milwaukee Brewers outfielder Abner Dalrymple hits for the cycle in a 10–4 win over the Washington Statesmen.

=== October–December ===
- October 4 – On the final day of the American Association season, Ted Breitenstein of the St. Louis Browns throws a no-hitter against the Louisville Colonels, in an 8–0 Browns win. It is Breitenstein's first major league start. He faced the minimum number of batters, 27, allowing just one base on balls. It was also the last no-hitter thrown in the American Association, as the league folded following the season.
- November 26 – A series for the championship of the Pacific coast begins between the champions of the California League (the San Jose Dukes) and the Pacific Northwest League pennant winners (the Portland Webfeet). San Jose wins the opener, 8–6. The series will last until January 10 with San Jose winning 10 games to 9. All the games are played in San Jose, California.

== Births ==
=== January ===
- January 1 – Charlie Schmutz
- January 2 – Joe Lotz
- January 3
  - John Dowd
  - Charlie Harding
- January 8 – Bud Weiser
- January 14 – John Shovlin
- January 15
  - Ray Chapman
  - Leo Townsend
- January 16
  - Marv Goodwin
  - Ferdie Schupp
- January 20 – Earl Smith
- January 23
  - Raymond Haley
  - Orie Kerlin
  - King Lear
- January 25 – George Lyons
- January 27 – Al Tesch
- January 28 – Bill Doak
- January 29 – Esty Chaney
- January 31
  - Tim Hendryx
  - Tex McDonald

=== February ===
- February 5 – Roger Peckinpaugh
- February 7 – Bill Dalrymple
- February 18
  - Sherry Smith
  - Zip Zabel
- February 22 – Clarence Mitchell
- February 26 – Jack Hammond

=== March ===
- March 1 – Roy Elsh
- March 2 – William Fischer
- March 4
  - José Acosta
  - Dazzy Vance
- March 5 – Walt Alexander
- March 6
  - Frank Fletcher
  - Clarence Garrett
- March 8 – Ollie O'Mara
- March 12 – Jack Little
- March 14 – Dave Gregg
- March 19 – Rube Schauer
- March 20 – Joe Boehling
- March 24 – Ernie Shore
- March 25 – Polly McLarry
- March 26 – Hardin Barry
- March 27 – Bill Rumler
- March 31
  - Jim Brown
  - Johnny Couch

=== April ===
- April 16
  - Charlie Meara
  - Ricardo Torres
- April 17 – Scott Perry
- April 20 – Dave Bancroft
- April 22 – Billy Orr
- April 24 – Pete Falsey
- April 30 – Tony Brottem

=== May ===
- May 2 – John Leary
- May 3 – Eppa Rixey
- May 4
  - Frank Bruggy
  - Vic Saier
- May 5
  - Bruno Haas
  - Jack McCandless
- May 8 – Red Hoff
- May 10 – Bob Geary
- May 11 – Roger Salmon
- May 15 – Karl Meister
- May 19
  - Dixie Carroll
  - George Clark
  - Dutch Schliebner
- May 20 – Joe Harris
- May 21
  - Doc Ayers
  - Bunny Hearn
- May 22 – Bill Cramer
- May 24 – Pete Sims
- May 26 – Gene Paulette

=== June ===
- June 1
  - Hank Severeid
  - Homer Thompson
- June 2 – Oscar Horstmann
- June 3 – Bill McTigue
- June 8 – Buck Danner
- June 9 – Charlie Kavanagh
- June 13 – Marty Kavanagh
- June 14
  - Jack Reis
  - Frank Withrow
- June 15
  - Frank Crossin
  - Lou North
- June 17 – Zeb Terry
- June 21 – Bert Adams
- June 23
  - Al Clauss
  - Johnny Priest
- June 25 – Pete Lapan
- June 26 – Mike Fitzgerald
- June 26 – Al Huenke

=== July ===
- July 1 – Fritz Scheeren
- July 3 – Joe Houser
- July 4 – Stump Edington
- July 6 – Steve O'Neill
- July 8 – Clyde Barfoot
- July 9 – Jim Scoggins
- July 12 – Hank Schreiber
- July 15 – Jim Breton
- July 17 – Eddie Brown
- July 19 – Earl Hamilton
- July 22
  - George Baumgardner
  - Herb Herring
- July 23 – Jack Theis
- July 28 – Joe Mathes
- July 29 – Fred Smith

=== August ===
- August 1 – Bob Emmerich
- August 4 – Jim Haislip
- August 8 – Chick Keating
- August 11
  - Karl Adams
  - Walter Barbare
- August 12 – Bill Lathrop
- August 15 – Tim Bowden
- August 17
  - Jack Powell
  - Arch Reilly
- August 18 – Wally Gerber
- August 19
  - Al DeVormer
  - Herbert Hill
  - Ike McAuley
- August 20 – Ed Hovlik
- August 21 – Jim Eschen
- August 22 – Happy Felsch
- August 26 – Bill Hopper
- August 28 – Byron Houck
- August 29 – Ray Callahan
- August 30
  - Steve Partenheimer
  - Pol Perritt

=== September ===
- September 1 – Austin Walsh
- September 3 – Katsy Keifer
- September 7 – Fred Blackwell
- September 8 – Verne Clemons
- September 9 – Dan Costello
- September 10 – Joe Evers
- September 12 – Joe Peploski
- September 16
  - Rogelio Crespo
  - George Orme
  - Dick Robertson
- September 21
  - Gil Britton
  - Pete Shields
- September 24 – Paddy Siglin
- September 26 – Tinsley Ginn
- September 27 – Doug Baird
- September 28 – Everett Booe

=== October ===
- October 2 – Eddie Murphy
- October 7 – George Batten
- October 8
  - Doug Neff
  - Monte Pfeffer
- October 13 – Fred McMullin
- October 14 – Bert Gallia
- October 17 – Frank Madden
- October 30 – Charlie Deal

=== November ===
- November 1 – Heinie Stafford
- November 3 – Charles Spearman
- November 5 – Greasy Neale
- November 6
  - Jeff McCleskey
  - Red Torphy
- November 7 – Tracy Baker
- November 11 – Rabbit Maranville
- November 12 – Carl Mays
- November 18 – Arthur Hauger
- November 20 – Leon Cadore
- November 30 – Joe Giebel

=== December ===
- December 1 – Johnny O'Connor
- December 3 – Larry Gilbert
- December 11 – Erwin Renfer
- December 12 – Tom Daly
- December 13 – Bob Wright
- December 14 – Al Tedrow
- December 16 – Fred Tyler
- December 19 – Pep Goodwin
- December 28 – Doc Carroll
- December 29 – Dave Skeels
- December 31 – Charlie Flannigan

== Deaths ==
- January 13 – Joe Connors, age unknown, pitched 3 games in 1884 in the Union Association.
- February 6 – Tom Healey, 38?, pitcher in 1878.
- April 14 – Frank Bell, 28, played for the 1885 Brooklyn Grays.
- May 20 – Jim Fogarty, 27, utility player from 1884 to 1890. Led the National League in stolen bases with 99 in 1889.
- May 21 – Jim Whitney, 33, pitcher who had five 20-win seasons, including 37 for 1883 Boston champions; led NL in wins, games and innings as 1881 rookie, in strikeouts in 1883; good hitter also played center field, batted .323 in 1882.
- June 10 – Jerry Dorgan, 34?, reserve player from 1880 to 1885.
- July 2 – John Cassidy, 34?, right fielder for five teams who batted .378 for the 1877 Hartford Dark Blues.
- July 14 – Bill Crowley, 34, outfielder from 1875 to 1885.
- July 29 – Steve Matthias, 31?, shortstop for the 1884 Chicago Browns/Pittsburgh Stogies of the Union Association.
- August 25 – Jerry Sweeney, 33, 1st baseman for the 1884 Kansas City Cowboys.
- August 28 – Joe Miller, 41, 2nd baseman who played from 1872 to 1875.
- October 11 – Will Smalley, 20, 3rd baseman for the 1890 Cleveland Spiders.
- October 14 – Larry Corcoran, 32, pitcher who won 175 games for the Chicago White Stockings from 1880 to 1885, led NL in wins, strikeouts and ERA once each; first pitcher to coordinate signals with his catcher, threw three no-hitters.
- October 21 – Ed Daily, 29, pitcher from 1885 to 1891. Won 26 games in 1885.
- November 19 – Ernie Hickman, 35, starting pitcher for the Kansas City Cowboys of the Union Association in 1884.
