= 1890 Brooklyn Gladiators season =

1890 Brooklyn Gladiators
- League: American Association
- Ballpark: Ridgewood Park
- City: Brooklyn, New York
- Record: 26–73 (.263)
- League place: 9th
- Manager: Jim Kennedy

The 1890 Brooklyn Gladiators baseball team finished with a 26–73 record, last place in the American Association during their only season in existence. The team failed to finish the season, folding after their game against the Syracuse Stars on August 25. They were replaced by the resurrected Baltimore Orioles franchise, which had left the league at the end of the 1889 season.

== Regular season ==
=== Season standings ===
American Association
Team	W	L	Pct.	GB	Home	Road
Louisville Colonels	88	44	.667	—	57‍–‍13	31‍–‍31
Columbus Solons	79	55	.590	10	47‍–‍22	32‍–‍33
St. Louis Browns	78	58	.574	12	45‍–‍25	33‍–‍33
Toledo Maumees	68	64	.515	20	40‍–‍27	28‍–‍37
Rochester Broncos	63	63	.500	22	40‍–‍22	23‍–‍41
Baltimore Orioles	15	19	.441	24	8‍–‍11	7‍–‍8
Syracuse Stars	55	72	.433	30½	30‍–‍30	25‍–‍42
Philadelphia Athletics	54	78	.409	34	36‍–‍36	18‍–‍42
Brooklyn Gladiators	26	73	.263	45½	15‍–‍22	11‍–‍51

=== Record vs. opponents ===
1890 American Association record Sources:
Team	BAL	BKG	COL	LOU	PHA	RCH	STL	SYR	TOL
Baltimore	—	0–0	2–4–2	1–2–1	2–2	5–1	2–5	1–2	2–3–1
Brooklyn	0–0	—	5–9	2–13	2–10	3–10–1	4–10	5–12	5–9
Columbus	4–2–2	9–5	—	10–8–1	11–9	10–9–1	12–8–2	10–7	13–7
Louisville	2–1–1	13–2	8–10–1	—	17–3	11–6–2	9–11	14–5	14–6
Philadelphia	2–2	10–2	9–11	3–17	—	7–12	7–13	10–7	6–14
Rochester	1–5	10–3–1	9–10–1	6–11–2	12–7	—	8–12–1	11–4–1	6–11–1
St. Louis	5–2	10–4	8–12–2	11–9	13–7	12–8–1	—	10–9	9–7
Syracuse	2–1	12–5	7–10	5–14	7–10	4–11–1	9–10	—	9–11
Toledo	3–2–1	9–5	7–13	6–14	14–6	11–6–1	7–9	11–9	—

=== Roster ===
1890 Brooklyn Gladiators
Roster
Pitchers: Tom Ford; Jack Lynch; Mike Mattimore; Charlie McCullough; Bob Murphy; Jim Powers; Steve Toole; Gus Williams	Catchers: Frank Bowes; Herman Pitz; Jim Toy; Infielders: Peter Connell; Jumbo Davis; Frank Fennelly; Joe Gerhardt; Candy Nelson; Billy O'Brien; Fred Siefke	Outfielders: Hi Church; Ed Daily; John Peltz; Hank Simon	Manager: Jim Kennedy

== Player stats ==
=== Batting ===
==== Starters by position ====
Note: Pos = Position; G = Games played; AB = At bats; H = Hits; Avg. = Batting average; HR = Home runs; RBI = Runs batted in

Pos	Player	G	AB	H	Avg.	HR	RBI
C	Jim Toy	44	160	29	.181	0	7
1B	Billy O'Brien	96	388	108	.278	4	67
2B	Joe Gerhardt	99	369	75	.203	2	40
SS	Candy Nelson	60	223	56	.251	0	12
3B	Jumbo Davis	38	142	43	.303	2	28
OF	Hank Simon	89	373	96	.257	0	38
OF	John Peltz	98	384	87	.227	1	33
OF	Ed Daily	91	394	94	.239	1	39

==== Other batters ====
Note: G = Games played; AB = At bats; H = Hits; Avg. = Batting average; HR = Home runs; RBI = Runs batted in

Player	G	AB	H	Avg.	HR	RBI
Frank Bowes	61	232	51	.220	0	24
Herman Pitz	61	189	26	.138	0	6
Frank Fennelly	45	178	44	.247	2	18
Fred Siefke	16	58	8	.138	0	3
Peter Connell	11	40	9	.225	0	3
Hi Church	3	9	1	.111	0	0

=== Pitching ===
==== Starting pitchers ====
Note: G = Games pitched; IP = Innings pitched; W = Wins; L = Losses; ERA = Earned run average; SO = Strikeouts

Player	G	IP	W	L	ERA	SO
Ed Daily	27	235.2	10	14	4.05	82
Charlie McCullough	26	215.2	4	21	4.59	61
Mike Mattimore	19	178.1	6	13	4.54	33
Bob Murphy	12	96.0	3	9	5.72	26
Steve Toole	6	53.1	2	4	4.05	10
Tom Ford	7	49.0	0	6	5.14	12
Gus Williams	2	12.0	0	1	7.50	2
Jack Lynch	1	9.0	0	1	12.00	1

==== Other pitchers ====
Note: G = Games pitched; IP = Innings pitched; W = Wins; L = Losses; ERA = Earned run average; SO = Strikeouts

Player	G	IP	W	L	ERA	SO
Jim Powers	4	30.0	1	2	5.70	3
