= New York Metropolitans all-time roster =

List of baseball players

The following is a list of players and who appeared in at least one game for the New York Metropolitans Major League Baseball franchise of the American Association from 1883 through 1887.

== B ==
- Ed Bagley
- Buck Becannon
- Steve Behel
- Steve Brady
- Cal Broughton

== C ==
- Bill Collins
- Peter Connell
- Sam Crane
- Clarence Cross
- Doug Crothers
- Joe Crotty
- Ed Cushman

== D ==
- Jim Donahue

== E ==
- Dude Esterbrook

== F ==
- Bill Fagan
- Tom Forster
- Elmer Foster

== G ==
- Joe Gerhardt

== H ==
- Charlie Hall
- Frank Hankinson
- Mortimer Hogan
- Bill Holbert
- Sadie Houck

== J ==
- Jones (third baseman)
- Charley Jones

== K ==
- Tim Keefe
- Ed Kennedy
- Tom Kinslow
- Jimmy Knowles

== L ==
- Jack Lynch

== M ==
- Fred Mauer
- Al Mays
- Tom McLaughlin
- James McMullin
- John Meister
- Jon Morrison
- Tony Murphy

== N ==
- Candy Nelson

== O ==
- Darby O'Brien
- Tom O'Brien
- Fred O'Neill
- John O'Rourke
- Dave Orr
- Henry Oxley

== P ==
- Charlie Parsons
- Gracie Pierce
- Dick Pierson
- Lip Pike

== R ==
- Paul Radford
- Joe Reilly
- Charlie Reipschlager
- Chief Roseman
- Cyclone Ryan

== S ==
- John Shaffer
- Andy Sommers

== T ==
- Dasher Troy

== W ==
- Stump Weidman

== Z ==
- Chief Zimmer
