= Somerville West Ends =

- 1891–1892; Somerville, New Jersey

Minor league affiliations
- Class: Independent (1891–1892)
- League: Central New Jersey League (1891–1892)

Major league affiliations
- Team: None

Minor league titles
- League titles (1): 1892

Team data
- Name: Somerville West Ends (1891–1892)
- Ballpark: Unknown

The Somerville West Ends were a minor league baseball team based in Somerville, New Jersey. In 1891 and 1892, the West Ends played exclusively as members of the Central New Jersey League, winning the 1892 league championship.

== History ==
The Central New Jersey League was formed for the 1891 season as an Independent level minor league. The exact teams and statistics of the 1891 season are unknown, but it is reported the Plainfield Crescent Cities with Baseball Hall of Fame player Willie Keeler won the championship, while Somerville and Westfield played in the league as well.

The Somerville West Ends continued play in the four–team 1892 Central New Jersey League. Somerville began play in the Independent level league on May 26, 1892. The Somerville West Ends joined the Elizabeth team from Elizabeth, New Jersey, Plainfield Crescent Cities, and Westfield Athletics from Westfield, New Jersey in league play.

The season concluded on September 24, 1892, with Somerville tied for 1st place, playing under manager Mack. The Elizabeth and Westfield franchises had both disbanded on September 3, 1892, with 5–11 records. The Somerville West Ends and Plainfield Crescent Cities were in a tie for first place with 12–6 records. However, the Plainfield franchise disbanded before a playoff with Somerville could be played.

Former and future major league players Jack Farrell, Jocko Fields, George Gore, and Jack Sharrott played for the 1892 Somerville West Ends.

The Central New Jersey League permanently folded following the 1892 season. Somerville has not hosted another minor league team.

== The ballpark ==
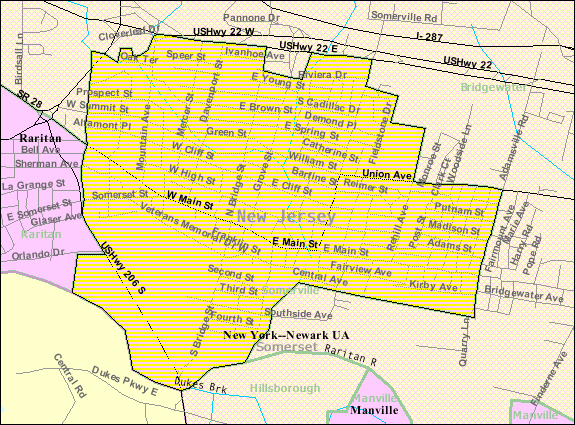
Census Bureau map of Somerville, New Jersey

The name and location of the Somerville West Ends' minor league home ballpark is unknown.

== Timeline ==
Year(s)	# Yrs.	Team	Level	League
1891–1892	2	Somerville West Ends	Independent	Central New Jersey League

== Year–by–year records ==
Year	Record	Finish	Manager	Playoffs/Notes
1891	NA	NA	NA	League records unknown
1892	22–11	1st	Mack	Tie, no playoff held

== Notable alumni ==
- Jack Farrell (1892)
- Jocko Fields (1892)
- George Gore (1892)
- Jack Sharrott (1892)

== See also ==
- Somerville West Ends players
