= Westfield Athletics =

- 1891–1892; Westfield, New Jersey

Minor league affiliations
- Class: Independent (1891–1892)
- League: Central New Jersey League (1891–1892)

Major league affiliations
- Team: None

Minor league titles
- League titles (0): None

Team data
- Name: Westfield Athletics (1891–1892)
- Ballpark: Unknown (1891–1892)

The Westfield Athletics were a minor league baseball team based in Westfield, New Jersey. In the 1891 and 1892 seasons, the "Athletics" played exclusively as a member of the independent Central New Jersey League.

== History ==
Minor league baseball began in Westfield, New Jersey in 1891. The Central New Jersey League was formed for the 1891 season as an Independent level minor league. The exact teams and statistics of the 1891 season are unknown, but it is reported the Plainfield Crescent Cities, with Baseball Hall of Fame player Willie Keeler won the championship and that Westfield and the Somerville team also played in the league.

The Westfield Athletics continued play in the four–team 1892 Central New Jersey League. Westfield began play in the Independent level league as the season began on May 26, 1892. The Westfield Athletics joined the Elizabeth team from Elizabeth, New Jersey, the Plainfield Crescent Cities and Somerville West Ends from Somerville, New Jersey in league play.

The 1892 Central New Jersey League season officially concluded on September 24, 1892. The season ended with the Westfield Athletics in fourth place with a record of 5–11, playing under manager E. E. Codding. But, the Westfield Athletics franchise had folded before the end of the season.

Before the 1892 season schedule was completed, both the Westfield Athletics and Elizabeth franchises disbanded on September 3, 1892. The teams both had 5–11 records when they folded. In the final Central New Jersey League standings, the Somerville West Ends and Plainfield Crescent Cities were in a tie for first place with 12–6 records, with Westfield and Elizabeth 6.0 games behind. However, the Plainfield franchise also disbanded before a playoff with Somerville could be played.

Future major league players Dude Esterbrook and Jack Sharrott played for the 1892 Westfield Athletics.

With three of its franchises folding before the end of the season, the Central New Jersey League permanently folded following the 1892 season. Westfield, New Jersey has not hosted another minor league team.

== The ballpark ==
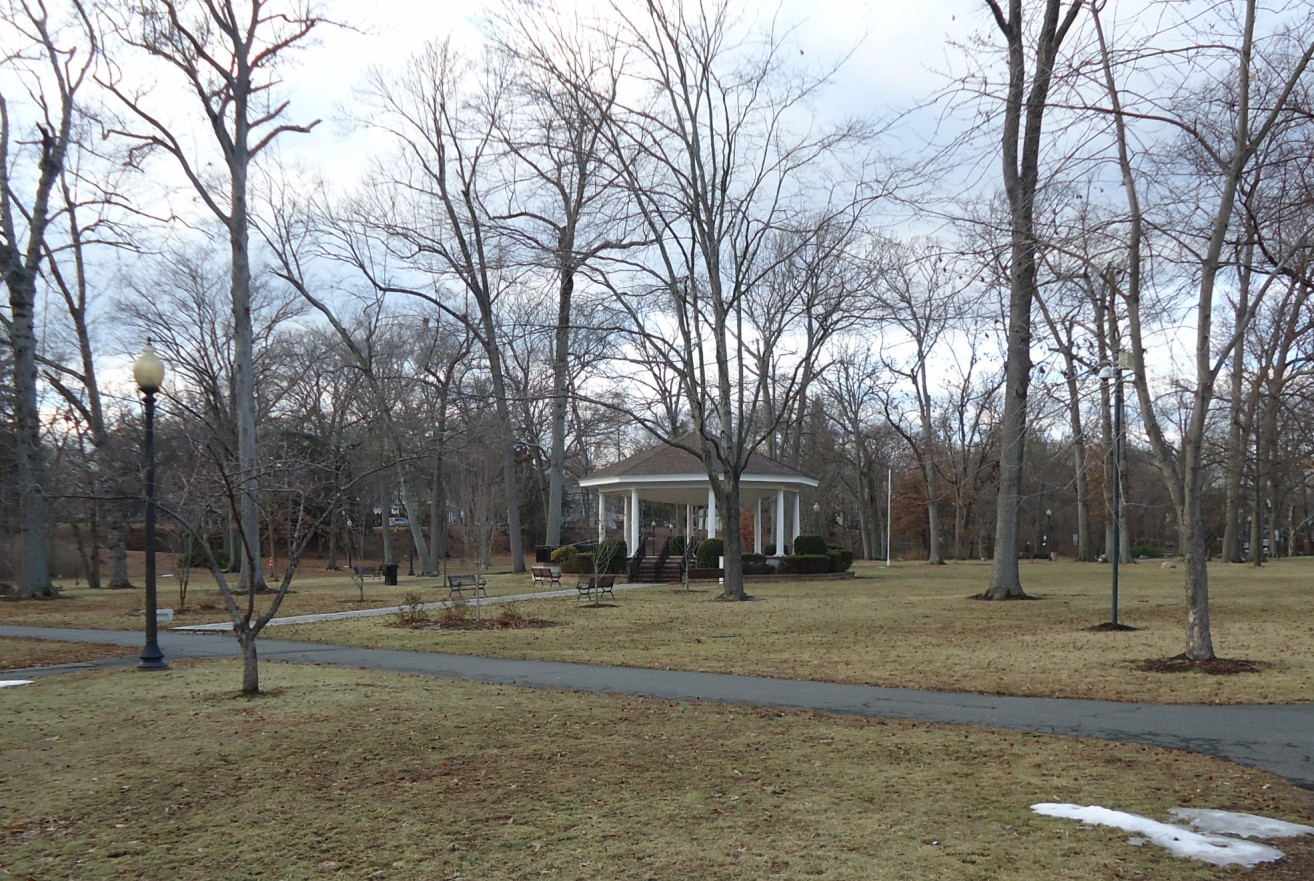
(2014) Westfield, New Jersey. Mindowaskin Park gazebo

The name and location of the Westfield Athletics' home minor league ballpark is not known.

== Timeline ==
Year(s)	# Yrs.	Team	Level	League
1891–1892	2	Westfield Athletics	Independent	Central New Jersey League

== Year–by–year records ==
Year	Record	Finish	Manager	Playoffs/Notes
1891	00–00	NA	NA	League records unknown
1892	5–11	4th	E. E. Codding	Team folded September 3

== Notable alumni ==
- Dude Esterbrook (1892)
- Jack Sharrott (1892)

== See also ==
Central New Jersey League alumni
Westfield Athletics players
