= Central New Jersey League =

Independent level baseball minor league

- Classification: Independent (1891–1892)
- Sport: Minor League Baseball
- First season: 1891
- Folded: 1892
- President: Unknown (1891–1892)
- No. of teams: 4
- Country: United States of America
- Most titles: 2 Plainfield Crescent Cities (1891–1892)
- Related competitions: South New Jersey League (1895–1897)

The Central New Jersey League was a minor league baseball league that played in 1891 and 1892. The Independent level Central New Jersey League member teams were based exclusively in New Jersey.

Baseball Hall of Fame member Willie Keeler played in the 1891 and 1892 league seasons as a member of the Plainfield Crescent Cities, leading the 1891 league in hitting.

== History ==
The Central New Jersey League was formed for the 1891 season as an Independent level minor league. The exact teams, records and statistics of the 1891 season are unknown. The Rahway Athletic Association applied to be a fifth team in the league, but was declined because the league considered five teams too much and that they could not rearrange the schedule to make a fifth team work.

Baseball Hall of Fame member Willie Keeler played as a member of the 1891 Plainfield team and led the team to the championship. It was reported Keeler hit .376 to lead the league while making $60.00 per month.

The Central New Jersey League continued play in the 1892 season, as an Independent level league with four teams beginning league play on May 26, 1892. The Elizabeth team from Elizabeth, New Jersey, the Plainfield Crescent Cities from Plainfield, New Jersey, Somerville West Ends from Somerville, New Jersey and Westfield Athletics from Westfield, New Jersey were the 1892 league members.

The season concluded on September 24, 1892, with the Plainfield Crescent Cities and Somerville West Ends in a tie for first place with both holding 12–6 records. The Elizabeth and Westfield franchises both disbanded on September 3, 1892. Plainfield disbanded before the playoff against Somerville could be played. Elizabeth and the Westfield Athletics were tied with 5–11 records when the franchises disbanded.

Willie Keeler continued play as a member of the 1892 Plainfield Crescent Cities. At age 20, Keeler left the Plainfield team in June to join Birmingham of the Eastern League before making his major league debut later in the 1892 season. Keeler debuted with the New York Giants on September 30, 1892 at the Polo Grounds.

The Central New Jersey League permanently folded as a minor league following the 1892 season. A 1911 league playing as the "Central New Jersey League" had Plainfield and Somerville as members. Likely, this league was a semi–pro league.

== Central New Jersey League teams ==
Team name(s)	City represented	Ballpark	Year
Elizabeth	Elizabeth, New Jersey	Unknown	1891–1892
Plainfield Crescent Cities	Plainfield, New Jersey	Crescent League Base Ball Grounds	1891–1892
Somerville West Ends	Somerville, New Jersey	Unknown	1891–1892
Westfield Athletics	Westfield, New Jersey	Unknown	1891–1892

== Year-by-year standings ==
=== 1892 Central New Jersey League standings ===
Team Standings	W	L	PCT	GB	Manager(s)
Plainfield Crescent Cities	12	6	.667	-	Charles Reed; Tom Keller / J.W. "Chick" Hoffer
Somerville West Ends	12	6	.667	-	Mack
Elizabeth	5	11	.312	6	NA
Westfield Athletics	5	11	.312	6	E. E. Codding

== Notable league alumni ==
=== Baseball Hall of Fame alumni ===
- Willie Keeler (1891–1892), Plainfield. Inducted, 1939

=== Notable alumni ===
- Dude Esterbrook (1892), Westfield
- Jack Farrell (1892), Somerville
- Jocko Fields (1892), Somerville
- George Gore (1892), Somerville
- Charlie Jones (1892), Elizabeth
- Jack Sharrott (1892), Somerville/Westfield
- Tuck Turner (1892), Plainfield
- Bob Murphy (1892), Plainfield
- Willie Murphy (1892), Plainfield
