= Frank Bowes =

American baseball player (1865–1895)

- Catcher/Outfielder/Third Baseman
- Born: 1865; Bath, New York, U.S.
- Died: January 21, 1895 (aged 29–30); Brooklyn, New York, U.S.
- Batted: Unknown Threw: Right

MLB debut
- April 17, 1890, for the Brooklyn Gladiators

Last MLB appearance
- August 25, 1890, for the Brooklyn Gladiators

MLB statistics
- At bats: 232
- RBI: 24
- Home Runs: 0
- Batting average: .220
- Stats at Baseball Reference

Teams
- Brooklyn Gladiators (1890)

Frances M. Bowes (1865 – January 21, 1895) was an American professional baseball player for one season. He appeared in 61 games for the 1890 Brooklyn Gladiators of the American Association. Bowes' father, Patrick, was police officer in the Greenpoint area of Brooklyn. After his baseball career, he was working for Edward C. Smith's box factory on Oakland Street. On January 21, 1895 he confronted his factory manager over his pay. William Snow, his manager, told him to talk to the owner but Bowes began assaulting Snow. Bowes continued though Snow warned him that he was armed. When Bowes did not comply, Snow shot him three times through the heart, killing him. Bowes is interred at Calvary Cemetery in Woodside, Queens, New York.
