= Augustine Williams =

Augustine Williams may refer to:

- Augustine Podmore Williams (1852–1916), English mariner
- Gus Williams (pitcher) (1870–1890), American baseball player
- Augustine Williams (footballer) (born 1997), Sierra Leonean footballer

== See also ==
- August Williams (disambiguation)
- Gus Williams (disambiguation)
