= Gus Williams =

Gus Williams may refer to:

== Sports ==
- Gus Williams (outfielder) (1888–1964), American baseball outfielder
- Gus Williams (pitcher) (1870–1890), American baseball pitcher
- Gus Williams (basketball) (1953–2025), American basketball player

== Others ==
- Gus Williams (vaudeville) (1848–1915), American comedian and songwriter
- Gus Williams (musician) (1937–2010), Australian country singer

== See also ==
- August Williams (disambiguation)
- Augustine Williams (disambiguation)
- Guy Williams (disambiguation)
