= Long Island Suburban Football Association =

19th Century US Soccer Competition

The Long Island Suburban Football Association was a league-style amateur competition involving the association football teams of 12 athletic clubs in Brooklyn and Queens, New York. It was to be an annual event but only lasted one season, 1895. The competition started on 13 January 1895 and concluded on 2 June 1895. Most games were played on Sunday. On Washington's Birthday (22 February), which fell on a Friday that year, each team played two games. Two games were also played on Decoration Day (now called Memorial Day), which fell on a Thursday that year (30 May).

This was not a simple home and home series. Some teams played each other only once or not at all. Some teams played each other multiple times. Two teams played each other 11 times.

== Schedule and results ==
=== Round 1 ===
13 January 1895	Woodside Athletic Club	5-2	Peerless Athletic Club	Woodside, Queens, New York
	Lewis; Newman; Elliott; Graves; McDonald	Report	Tierney; Matthews	Stadium: Woodside A C Grounds; Referee: James W Forster (Olympic A C)

13 January 1895	Glendale Athletic Club	4-3	Hamilton Athletic Club	Glendale, Queens, New York
	Voorhees; Morgan; Phelan; Sloan	Report	O'Donnell; Slaughnessey	Referee: William H Parker (Bay View A C)

13 January 1895	Ridgewood Athletic Club	7-4	Bay View Athletic Club	Ridgewood, Queens, New York
	Barton; Carroll; McCormick; Morris; Higgins; Burns; Valentine	Report	Parsons; Heyward; McGuire; Gulick	Referee: William H Parker (Bay View A C)

13 January 1895	Bushwick Athletic Club	2-3	Olympic Athletic Club	Bushwick, Brooklyn, New York
	Hermann; Carroll	Report	Harrison; Loring; Bahler	Stadium: Bushwick A C Grounds; Referee: John J Kelly (Glendale A C)

13 January 1895	Newtown Athletic Club	1-5	Atlantic Athletic Club	Ridgewood, Queens, New York
	Kraft	Report	Parsons; Callahan; Anderson; Ellery; McGarry	Stadium: Ridgewood Park; Referee: James H Pierce (Hamilton A C)

13 January 1895	Empire Athletic Club	4-2	Dauntless Athletic Club	Fort Hamilton, Brooklyn, New York
	Lowe; Ball; Halsey; Pearce	Report	Reynolds; Horton	Stadium: Fort Hamilton Grounds; Referee: Clark W Martin (Woodside A C)

=== Round 2 ===
20 January 1895	Olympic Athletic Club	4-3	Bay View Athletic Club	Ridgewood, Queens, New York
	Harrison; Blauvelt; Loring; Bahler	Report	Heyward; McGuire; Gulick	Stadium: Ridgewood A C Grounds; Referee: Herman j Schneider (Bushwick A C)

20 January 1895	Peerless Athletic Club	2-4	Woodside Athletic Club	Brooklyn, New York
	Conroy; Dowd	Report	Martin; Graves; Elliott; McDonald	Stadium: Bay View A C Grounds; Referee: James W Foster (Olympic A C)

20 January 1895	Glendale Athletic Club	5-3	Newtown Athletic Club	Glendale, Queens, New York
	Sloan; Burns (2); McGowan; Voorhees	Report	Laney; Hutchinson; Carson	Stadium: Glendale A C Grounds; Referee: James W Foster (Olympic A C)

20 January 1895	Dauntless Athletic Club	3-1	Empire Athletic Club	Ridgewood, Queens, New York
	Reynolds; Blake; Henderson	Report	Heaney	Stadium: Ridgewood Park; Referee: Clarke W Martin (Woodside A C)

20 January 1895	Atlantic Athletic Club	4-2	Bushwick Athletic Club	?
	Travis; Anderson; Ellery; McGarry	Report	Bach; Grace	Stadium: ? Referee: John J Kelly (Glendale A C)

20 January 1895	Hamilton Athletic Club	5-4	Ridgewood Athletic Club	?
	Raymond; O'Donnell (2); Arthur; Dellmore	Report	Carroll; Gregory; McCormick (2)	Stadium: ? Referee: P. Schleuter (Bushwick A C)

=== Round 3 ===
27 January 1895	Hamilton Athletic Club	5-8	Glendale Athletic Club	Fort Hamilton, Brooklyn, New York
	Raymond; Hunter; Claverley; O'Donnell; Arthur	Report	Sloan (2); Byrnes; Watson; Morgan; Pratt (2); Gatgens	Stadium: Hamilton A C Grounds; Referee: William H Parker (Bay View A C)

27 January 1895	Woodside Athletic Club	6-3	Peerless Athletic Club	Woodside, Queens, New York
	Martin (2); Lewis; Newman; Elliott; Crowley	Report	Dowd; Breen; Flaherty	Stadium: Woodside A C Grounds; Referee: James W Foster (Olympic A C)

27 January 1895	Olympic Athletic Club	3-4	Bushwick Athletic Club	Woodside, Queens, New York
	Blake; Jones; Ogden	Report	Bach; Purdy; Fischer; Windell	Stadium: Woodside A C Grounds; Referee: John J Kelley (Glendale A C)

27 January 1895	Bay View Athletic Club	5-6	Ridgewood Athletic Club	Brooklyn, New York
	Heyward; Morse; O'Dell; Terry; Lee	Report	Barton; Gregory; Loomis; Carroll; Higgins; Ballantine	Stadium: Bay View A C Grounds; Referee: Herman J Schneider (Bushwick A C)

27 January 1895	Atlantic Athletic Club	4-2	Newtown Athletic Club	Ridgewood, Queens, New York
	Callahan; Mason; McGarry; Parsons	Report	Hutchinson; Alberts	Referee: John H Pierce (Hamilton A C)

27 January 1895	Dauntless Athletic Club	3-2	Empire Athletic Club	Newtown, Queens, New York
	Reynolds; Horton; Raymond	Report	Wordeen; Pearce	Referee: Clark W Martin (Woodside A C)

=== Round 4 ===
3 February 1895	Woodside Athletic Club	4-2	Olympic Athletic Club	Woodside, Queens, New York
	Cronley; Graves; Bates; Lewis	Report	Denheny; Harrison	Stadium: Woodside A C Grounds; Referee: James W Foster (Glendale A C)

3 February 1895	Ridgewood Athletic Club	3-1	Newtown Athletic Club	?
	Gregory; McCormick; Morris	Report	Kraft	Stadium: ? Referee: Herman J Schneider (Bushwick A C)

3 February 1895	Glendale Athletic Club	5-4	Bay View Athletic Club	Glendale, Queens, New York
	Sloan; Watson (2); Pratt; O'Brien	Report	McGuire; Morse; Parker; Parsons	Stadium: Glendale A C Grounds; Referee: Walter P Barker (Olympic A C)

3 February 1895	Bushwick Athletic Club	1-2	Atlantic Athletic Club	Bushwick, Brooklyn, New York
	Hermann	Report	Morris; Anderson	Stadium: Bushwick A C Grounds; Referee: James H Pierce (Hamilton A C)

3 February 1895	Hamilton Athletic Club	5-4	Empire Athletic Club	?
	Gordon (2); Arthur; Claverley; Fielding	Report	Green; Cantor; Worden; Heaney	Stadium: ? Referee: Henry R Pierce (Riverdale A C)

3 February 1895	Dauntless Athletic Club	2-4	Peerless Athletic Club	Newtown, Queens, New York
	Henderson; Raymond	Report	Buckley; Dowd; Matthews; Ryan	Stadium: Newtown A C Grounds; Referee: John J Clark (Woodside A C)

=== Round 5 ===
10 February 1895	Olympic Athletic Club	3-2	Dauntless Athletic Club	?
	Harrison; Ogden; Bahler	Report	Raymond; Reynolds	Referee: Herman J Schneider (Bushwick A C)

10 February 1895	Empire Athletic Club	4-3	Bushwick Athletic Club	?
	Halsey; Worden; Ball; Pearce	Report	Carroll; Fielding; Honoford	Referee: James H Pierce (Hamilton A C)

10 February 1895	Bay View Athletic Club	4-2	Newtown Athletic Club	?
	Parker; Lee; Parsons; Heyward	Report	Hutchinson; Alberts	Referee: Walter J Oakes (Glendale A C)

10 February 1895	Ridgewood Athletic Club	5-3	Hamilton Athletic Club	?
	Barton; Valentine; Carroll (2); Gregory	Report	Martin; Claverley; Shaughnessey	Referee: Richard D Grant (Glendale A C)

10 February 1895	Glendale Athletic Club	4-5	Peerless Athletic Club	?
	MacGowan; Watson; Voorhees; Pratt	Report	Matthews; Moore; Breen; Dowd; Flaherty	Referee: Thomas V Richardson (Woodside A C)

10 February 1895	Atlantic Athletic Club	5-3	Woodside Athletic Club	?
	P. O'Brien; Worden; McGarry (2); Mason	Report	Cronley; Newman; Bates	Referee: William H Parker (Bay View A C)

=== Round 6 ===
17 February 1895	Woodside Athletic Club	3-4	Atlantic Athletic Club	?
	Cronley; Neuman; Foster	Report	McGarry; Wright; Morris; Mason	Referee: Edward J Pierson (Glendale A C)

17 February 1895	Dauntless Athletic Club	4-2	Olympic Athletic Club	?
	Henderson (2); Gourley; Hoage	Report	Jones; Loring	Referee: Herman J Schneider (Bushwick A C)

17 February 1895	Bushwick Athletic Club	6-3	Empire Athletic Club	?
	Henry; Hermann (3); Fielding; Windell	Report	Worden; Pearce (2)	Referee: Daniel G Loring (Glendale A C)

17 February 1895	Peerless Athletic Club	2-4	Glendale Athletic Club	?
	Matthews; Breen	Report	Phelan; Morgan; Byrnes; Gatgens	Referee: Thomas V Richardson (Woodside A C)

17 February 1895	Ridgewood Athletic Club	6-4	Hamilton Athletic Club	?
	O'Connor (2); Pierson; Bright; Clarke (2)	Report	Kroft; Hart; Martin (2)	Referee: Robert G O'Brien (Atlantic A C)

17 February 1895	Newtown Athletic Club	2-1	Bay View Athletic Club	?
	Hutchinson; Laney	Report	McGuire	Referee: Walter J Oakes (Glendale A C)

=== Round 7 ===
22 February 1895	Atlantic Athletic Club	4-3	Hamilton Athletic Club	?
	Worden (2); McGarry; Morris	Report	Kraft; Hartt; Fielding	Referee: Edward J Pierson (Glendale A C)

22 February 1895	Woodside Athletic Club	2-1	Ridgewood Athletic Club	?
	Elliott; Neuman	Report	Harrison	Referee: Charles J Purdy (Atlantic A C)

22 February 1895	Dauntless Athletic Club	4-2	Bay View Athletic Club	?
	Reynolds; Horton; Blake; Henderson	Report	Parker; McGuire	Referee: Walter J Oakes (Glendale A C)

22 February 1895	Bushwick Athletic Club	6-5	Olympic Athletic Club	?
	Horoford (2); Bach; Hermann; Windell; Fielding	Report	Hanley; Bahler (2); Lowerre; Blauvell	Referee: David W G Loring (Glendale A C)

22 February 1895	Empire Athletic Club	3-6	Glendale Athletic Club	?
	Wardell; Greene; Rollins	Report	Voorhees (2); O'Brien; Freleigh (2); Byrnes	Referee: Thomas V Richardson (Woodside A C)

22 February 1895	Peerless Athletic Club	3-2	Newtown Athletic Club	?
	Harding; Tierney; Daniels	Report	Alberts; Hutchinson	Referee: Charles P Snelder (Bushwick A C)

=== Round 8 ===
22 February 1895	Hamilton Athletic Club	2-5	Atlantic Athletic Club	?
	Pearce; O'Donnell	Report	Clark (2); Coffin; Moore; Herbert	Referee: William H Parker (Woodside A C)

22 February 1895	Ridgewood Athletic Club	5-4	Woodside Athletic Club	?
	Cunningham (2); Kane (2); Raymond	Report	Robinson; MacComber; Graves; Price	Referee: Charles J Purdy

22 February 1895	Bay View Athletic Club	5-3	Dauntless Athletic Club	?
	Parker (2); Morse; Hennessey; Perry	Report	Reynolds; Bennett; Skinner	Referee: Walter J Oakes (Glendale A C)

22 February 1895	Olympic Athletic Club	3-2	Bushwick Athletic Club	?
	Hanley; W Purdy; Connaughton	Report	J Purdy; Christoffers	Referee: David J Long (Williamsburgh A A)

22 February 1895	Glendale Athletic Club	5-2	Empire Athletic Club	?
	Morgan; Sloane; Gatgens; Byrans; O'Brien	Report	Lowe; Canter	Referee: David J Long (Williamsburgh A A)

22 February 1895	Newtown Athletic Club	5-2	Peerless Athletic Club	?
	Hutchinson (2); Carson; Alters (?); Williams	Report	Breen; Matthews	Referee: Charles P Snelder (Bushwick A C)

=== Round 9 ===
24 February 1895	Woodside Athletic Club	8-2	Newtown Athletic Club	?
		Report

24 February 1895	Glendale Athletic Club	5-4	Atlantic Athletic Club	?
		Report

24 February 1895	Ridgewood Athletic Club	5-3	Dauntless Athletic Club	?
		Report

24 February 1895	Bushwick Athletic Club	4-2	Peerless Athletic Club	?
		Report

24 February 1895	Bay View Athletic Club	3-2	Olympic Athletic Club	?
		Report

24 February 1895	Empire Athletic Club	3-7	Hamilton Athletic Club	?
		Report

=== Round 10 ===
3 March 1895	Atlantic Athletic Club	2-4	Glendale Athletic Club	Queens, New York
	Leonard; Kent	Report	Upham; Clay; Claverley; Higgins	Referee: William H Parker (Bay View A C)

3 March 1895	Newtown Athletic Club	2-4	Woodside Athletic Club	?
	Fredericks; Downing	Report	Townsend; Hastings; Grant; Murphy	Referee: James H Grant (Glendale A C)

3 March 1895	Dauntless Athletic Club	1-3	Ridgewood Athletic Club	?
	O'Donnell	Report	McCormick; Shaugnessey; Heyward	Referee: Henry P Schneider (Bushwick A C)

3 March 1895	Peerless Athletic Club	4-3	Bushwick Athletic Club	?
	Lawrence; Roberts; Richards; Loring	Report	Woodsley; McGarry; Carroll	Referee: Richard P Morgan (Woodside A C)

3 March 1895	Bay View Athletic Club	5-2	Olympic Athletic Club	?
	Morris; Dantzberger; Vanentine; Parker; Weed	Report	Reymund; Meyerberger	Referee: Andrew J McDonald (Empire A C)

3 March 1895	Hamilton Athletic Club	6-4	Empire Athletic Club	?
	Freleigh; Edmonds (2); Reynolds; Powell; Martin	Report	Knoebel; Rooney; McTighe; Rice	Referee: Edward J Woodman (Dauntless A C)

=== Round 11 ===
10 March 1895	Glendale Athletic Club	5-2	Peerless Athletic Club	?
	?	Report	?	Referee: Edward J Woodman (Dauntless A C)

10 March 1895	Hamilton Athletic Club	2-5	Atlantic Athletic Club	?
	?	Report	?

10 March 1895	Woodside Athletic Club	6-0	Bay View Athletic Club	?
	?	Report	?

10 March 1895	Newtown Athletic Club	1-4	Ridgewood Athletic Club	?
	?	Report	?

10 March 1895	Bushwick Athletic Club	3-2	Dauntless Athletic Club	?
	?	Report	?

10 March 1895	Olympic Athletic Club	2-4	Empire Athletic Club	?
	?	Report	?

=== Round 12 ===
17 March 1895	Peerless Athletic Club	3-4	Glendale Athletic Club	?
	Lawrence; Williams; Richards	Report	Clay; Higgins; Upham; Claverley	Referee: Edward J Woodman (Dauntless A C)

17 March 1895	Atlantic Athletic Club	4-5	Hamilton Athletic Club	?
	J. Lynch; P. Lynch; Hammond; Reilly	Report	Reynolds; Powell (2); Edwards; Wright	Referee: William H Parker (Bay View A C)

17 March 1895	Bay View Athletic Club	1-5	Woodside Athletic Club	?
	Dantzberger	Report	Townsend; Murphy; Arthur; Cannon; Hastings	Referee: Andrew J McDonald (Empire A C)

17 March 1895	Ridgewood Athletic Club	3-2	Newtown Athletic Club	?
	Shaugnessey; McCormick; Harrison	Report	MacComber; Fredericks	Referee: Richard P Morgan (Woodside A C)

17 March 1895	Dauntless Athletic Club	2-4	Bushwick Athletic Club	?
	McGarry; Lynne	Report	Woodsley; Schlenter; O'Dowd; Tichnor	Referee: James H Grant (Glendale A C)

17 March 1895	Olympic Athletic Club	3-2	Empire Athletic Club	?
	Hanlon; Robinson; Raymond	Report	Knoebel; Woodman	Referee: Henry P Schneider (Bushwick A C)

=== Round 13 ===
24 March 1895	Glendale Athletic Club	5-2	Peerless Athletic Club	?
	Brown; Higgins; Claverley; Koster; Morse	Report	Richards; Lawrence	Referee: Edward J Woodman (Dauntless A C)

24 March 1895	Atlantic Athletic Club	5-3	Hamilton Athletic Club	?
	Wood (2); Hammond; P. Lynch; Reilley	Report	Reynolds; Powell; Hennessey	Referee: William H Parker (Bay View A C)

24 March 1895	Woodside Athletic Club	4-2	Bay View Athletic Club	?
	Murphy; Townsend; Cannon; Keller	Report	Valentine; Raynor	Referee: Andrew J McDonald (Empire A C)

24 March 1895	Newtown Athletic Club	2-4	Ridgewood Athletic Club	?
	Crosby; Fredericks	Report	Carter; McGuire; McCormick; Shaugnessey	Referee: Richard P Morgan (Woodside A C)

24 March 1895	Bushwick Athletic Club	5-3	Dauntless Athletic Club	?
	Tichenor; Woodsley; Carroll; O'Dowd; Porter	Report	O'Donnell; Conant; Marshall	Referee: James H Grant (Glendale A C)

24 March 1895	Empire Athletic Club	3-2	Olympic Athletic Club	?
	Everson; Rooney; Woodman	Report	Rendell; Meyerburg	Referee: Henry P Schneider (Bushwick A C)

=== Round 14 ===
31 March 1895	Glendale Athletic Club	4-2	Dauntless Athletic Club	?
	Upham; Higgins; Claverley; Koster	Report	Edwards; Marshall	Referee: Henry P Schneider (Bushwick A C)

31 March 1895	Peerless Athletic Club	3-5	Woodside Athletic Club	?
	Richards; Lawrence; Roberts	Report	Townsend; Cannon; Murphy; Keller (2)	Referee: Edward J Woodman (Dauntless A C)

31 March 1895	Atlantic Athletic Club	5-2	Empire Athletic Club	?
	Miller; Ennis (2); Hammond; J. Lynch	Report	Hundsmuir; Mangois	Referee: William H Parker (Bay View A C)

31 March 1895	Hamilton Athletic Club	2-3	Ridgewood Athletic Club	?
	Hennessey; Ormsby	Report	Shaugnessey; Harrison; McCormick	Referee: Andrew J MacDonald (Empire A C)

31 March 1895	Bushwick Athletic Club	5-3	Newtown Athletic Club	?
	Woodsley; Magson; Greene; Tichenor; Schleuter	Report	Gatzens; Hesser; MacComber	Referee: Richard P Morgan (Woodside A C)

31 March 1895	Olympic Athletic Club	2-3	Bay View Athletic Club	?
	Raymond; Meyerburg	Report	Dantzberger; Valentine; Luscom	Referee: James H Grant (Glendale A C)

=== Round 15 ===
7 April 1895	Dauntless Athletic Club	3-5	Glendale Athletic Club	?
	Parsons; Mason; McGarry	Report	Upham; Harris; Brown; Claverley (2)	Referee: Richard P Morgan (Woodside A C)

7 April 1895	Woodside Athletic Club	4-2	Peerless Athletic Club	?
	Townsend; Murphy; Leroy; Cannon	Report	Lawrence; Williams	Referee: James H Grant (Glendale A C)

7 April 1895	Empire Athletic Club	3-5	Atlantic Athletic Club	?
	?	Report	?	Referee: William H Parker (Bay View A C)

7 April 1895	Hamilton Athletic Club	3-2	Ridgewood Athletic Club	?
	Reynolds; Hennessey; Lamont	Report	Shaughnessey; Carter	Referee: Andrew J MacDonald (Empire A C)

7 April 1895	Newtown Athletic Club	5-7	Bushwick Athletic Club	?
	Crosby; MacComber; Walthers; Downing; Reynolds	Report	Geisler (2); Oppenheiner; Samuels (2); Schneider; Greene	Referee: James W Barry (Olympic A C)

7 April 1895	Bay View Athletic Club	4-2	Olympic Athletic Club	?
	?	Report	?	Referee: Henry P Schneider (Bushwick A C)

=== Round 16 ===
14 April 1895	Atlantic Athletic Club	4-3	Glendale Athletic Club	?
	Kent; Miller; Young; Hammond	Report	Claverley; Gordon; Higgins	Referee: Andrew J McDonald (Empire A C)

14 April 1895	Woodside Athletic Club	5-4	Hamilton Athletic Club	?
	Brady; Arthur; Leroy; Townsend; Hastings	Report	Reynolds; Martin; Powell; Grant	Referee: William H Parker (Bay View A C)

14 April 1895	Ridgewood Athletic Club	6-2	Newtown Athletic Club	?
	Carter; Scharff; McCormick (2); Shaugnessey; Ryan	Report	Fredericks; MacComber	Referee: Richard P Morgan (Woodside A C)

14 April 1895	Peerless Athletic Club	4-3	Bay View Athletic Club	?
	Lawrence; Williams; Richards; Purdy	Report	Parker; Luscom; Dantzberger	Referee: James H Grant (Glendale A C)

14 April 1895	Bushwick Athletic Club	4-2	Empire Athletic Club	?
	Schleuter; Woodsley; McGarry; O'Dowd	Report	Hendmuir; Woodman	Referee: Edward J Morrison (Dauntless A C)

14 April 1895	Olympic Athletic Club	5-2	Dauntless Athletic Club	?
	Hanlon; Robinson; Redfield; Meyerburg; Watson	Report	Marshall; O'Donnell	Referee: Henry P Schneider (Bushwick A C)

=== Round 17 ===
21 April 1895	Glendale Athletic Club	4-4	Atlantic Athletic Club	?
	Williams; Upham; Lawrence; Ford	Report	Miller; Hammond; P. O'Brien; Kent	Referee: Edward J Woodman (Dauntless A C)

21 April 1895	Hamilton Athletic Club	2-3	Woodside Athletic Club	?
	Reynolds; Ormsby	Report	Townsend; Murphy; Hastings	Referee: William H Parker (Bay View A C)

21 April 1895	Newtown Athletic Club	2-4	Ridgewood Athletic Club	?
	Gatgens; Lennon	Report	Shaugnessey; Scharff; Ryan; Heyward	Referee: Richard P Morgan (Woodside A C)

21 April 1895	Bay View Athletic Club	2-4	Peerless Athletic Club	?
	Dantzberger; Valentine	Report	Roberts; Claverley; Higgins; Richards	Referee: Andrew J MacDonald (Empire A C)

21 April 1895	Dauntless Athletic Club	6-4	Olympic Athletic Club	?
	O'Donnell; Morgan; Lynn; Marshall; Phelan; Webber	Report	Meyerburg; Redfield; Randall; Hanlon	Referee: Henry P Schneider (Bushwick A C)

21 April 1895	Empire Athletic Club	3-5	Bushwick Athletic Club	?
	Everson; Knoebel; Woodman	Report	Carroll; Schneider; Porter; Raymond; Tichenor	Referee: James H Grant (Glendale A C)

=== Round 18 ===
28 April 1895	Atlantic Athletic Club	5-3	Dauntless Athletic Club	?
	Wood; P. Lynch; Hammond; O'Brien; Ennis	Report	Edwards; Marshall; Conant	Referee: Andrew J MacDonald (Empire A C)

28 April 1895	Bay View Athletic Club	1-4	Glendale Athletic Club	?
	Raynor	Report	Upham; Williams; Lawrence; Morse	Referee: Edward J Woodman (Dauntless A C)

28 April 1895	Bushwick Athletic Club	5-3	Olympic Athletic Club	?
	Schneider; Carroll; Heffernan; Woodsley; Greene	Report	Meyerburg; Robinson; Gumbert	Referee: William H Parker (Bay View A C)

28 April 1895	Empire Athletic Club	2-6	Hamilton Athletic Club	?
	Hundmuir; Knoebel	Report	Reynolds; Powell (2); Lamont; Hennessey; Ormsby	Referee: Henry P Schneider (Bushwick A C)

28 April 1895	Woodside Athletic Club	7-3	Newtown Athletic Club	?
	Shaw; Hastings (2); Connors (2); Townsend; Brady	Report	Crosby; Hesser; Fredericks	Referee: James H Grant (Glendale A C)

28 April 1895	Ridgewood Athletic Club	5-2	Peerless Athletic Club	?
	McCormick; Shaugnessey; Heyward; Harrison; Carter	Report	Richards; Claverley	Referee: Richard P Morgan (Woodside A C)

=== Round 19 ===
5 May 1895	Dauntless Athletic Club	2-6	Atlantic Athletic Club	?
	Everett; Foster	Report	J. Lynch; McGrath; P. Lynch; Kent; Hammond; O'Brien	Referee: Andrew J MacDonald (Empire A C)

5 May 1895	Peerless Athletic Club	3-4	Ridgewood Athletic Club	?
	Richards; Carter; Roberts	Report	Carter; Hogan; McCormick; Scharff	Referee: Richard P Morgan (Woodside A C)

5 May 1895	Newtown Athletic Club	4-6	Woodside Athletic Club	?
	MacComber; Winters; Kaalt; Wernberger	Report	Connors; Arthur; Murphy; Leroy; Hunter; Weed	Referee: James H Grant (Glendale A C)

5 May 1895	Hamilton Athletic Club	5-6	Empire Athletic Club	?
	Powell; Neldinger; Ward; Reynolds; Grant	Report	Ryan; McTighe; Knoebel (2); Rooney; Hundmuir	Referee: Henry P Schneider (Bushwick A C)

5 May 1895	Olympic Athletic Club	2-4	Bushwick Athletic Club	?
	Rendell; Mayers	Report	J Schleuter; Greene; Manson; Woodsley	Referee: William H Parker (Bay View A C)

5 May 1895	Glendale Athletic Club	5-2	Bay View Athletic Club	?
	Lawrence; Zahler; Brown; Williams; Worth	Report	McBride; Valentine	Referee: Edward J Woodman (Dauntless A C)

=== Round 20 ===
12 May 1895	Bay View Athletic Club	3-6	Glendale Athletic Club	?
	Pfarrer; Lyons; Seccombe	Report	Morse (2); Lawrence; Purdy; Hough; King	Referee: Edward J Woodman (Dauntless A C)

12 May 1895	Atlantic Athletic Club	8-3	Dauntless Athletic Club	?
	P. Lynch (3); McGrath; Hammond; J. Lynch; Reilley (2)	Report	O'Donnell; Newman; Lyons	Referee: Andrew J MacDonald (Empire A C)

12 May 1895	Woodside Athletic Club	4-2	Newtown Athletic Club	?
	Phillips; Levine; Connors; Townsend	Report	Kraft; MacComber	Referee: James H Grant (Glendale A C)

12 May 1895	Bushwick Athletic Club	3-3	Olympic Athletic Club	?
	J. Schneider; Tichenor; McGarry	Report	Woods; MacMahon; O'Neill	Referee: William H Parker (Bay View A C)

12 May 1895	Empire Athletic Club	5-4	Hamilton Athletic Club	?
	Seegul (2); Knoebel; Rooney; Rice	Report	W. Neldinger; Edwards; Powell; Ward	Referee: Henry P Schneider (Bushwick A C)

12 May 1895	Ridgewood Athletic Club	6-4	Peerless Athletic Club	?
	Hogan; Burns (2); McGuire; Sloane; Ryan	Report	J. Chase; Kelly; Loring; Barton	Referee: Richard P Morgan (Woodside A C)

=== Round 21 ===
19 May 1895	Olympic Athletic Club	3-5	Bushwick Athletic Club	?
	Rendell; Purdey; Meyerberger	Report	Clark; McGarry; O'Dowd; Mason; Murphy	Referee: James H Grant (Glendale A C)

19 May 1895	Ridgewood Athletic Club	4-2	Newtown Athletic Club	?
	Sloane; Burns; Harrison; Ryan	Report	MacComber; Fredericks	Referee: Richard P Morgan (Woodside A C)

19 May 1895	Empire Athletic Club	2-3	Dauntless Athletic Club	?
	Madden; Rice	Report	O'Donnell; Morgan; Conant	Referee: Henry P Schneider (Bushwick A C)

19 May 1895	Woodside Athletic Club	6-4	Hamilton Athletic Club	?
	Keller (2); Leonard; Brady (2); Townsend	Report	Moore; Lamont; Ward; Powell	Referee: Andrew J MacDonald (Empire A C)

19 May 1895	Atlantic Athletic Club	6-2	Bay View Athletic Club	?
	P. Lynch (2); Hammond; Miller; Ennis (2)	Report	Dantzberger; Valentine	Referee: Edward J Woodman (Dauntless A C)

19 May 1895	Peerless Athletic Club	3-7	Glendale Athletic Club	?
	Lawrence; Williams; Roberts	Report	McCarthy (2); Breen; Brown (2); Parker; Gordon	Referee: Edward J Woodman (Dauntless A C)

=== Round 22 ===
26 May 1895	Dauntless Athletic Club	4-3	Empire Athletic Club	?
	Edwards; Moore; Conant; Patterson	Report	Warden; Lewis	Referee: Henry P Schneider (Bushwick A C)

26 May 1895	Bushwick Athletic Club	4-2	Olympic Athletic Club	?
	Work; Mason; Carson; Schleuter	Report	Meyerberger; Floyd	Referee: James H Grant (Glendale A C)

26 May 1895	Glendale Athletic Club	4-1	Peerless Athletic Club	?
	Parker; Coster; Higgins; Breen	Report	Roberts	Referee: Edward J Woodman (Dauntless A C)

26 May 1895	Newtown Athletic Club	3-5	Ridgewood Athletic Club	?
	Moxson; Downing; Bates	Report	Heyward; McGuire (2); Burns; Scharff	Referee: Richard P Morgan (Woodside A C)

26 May 1895	Bay View Athletic Club	2-6	Atlantic Athletic Club	?
	Raynor; Valentine	Report	J. Lynch; Hammond (2); Kent; Young (2)	Referee: Edward J Woodman (Dauntless A C)

26 May 1895	Hamilton Athletic Club	5-5	Woodside Athletic Club	?
	Walsh; Gateson (2); Lamont; Ward	Report	Poole; Porbat (2); Hastings; Keller	Referee: Andrew J MacDonald (Empire A C)

=== Round 23 and 24 ===
30 May 1895	Newtown Athletic Club	2-2	Woodside Athletic Club	?
	?	Report	?	Referee: ?

30 May 1895	Woodside Athletic Club	6-5	Hamilton Athletic Club	?
	?	Report	?	Referee: ?

30 May 1895	Empire Athletic Club	2-3	Dauntless Athletic Club	?
	?	Report	?	Referee: ?

30 May 1895	Dauntless Athletic Club	2-5	Atlantic Athletic Club	?
	?	Report	?	Referee: ?

30 May 1895	Olympic Athletic Club	2-4	Bushwick Athletic Club	?
	?	Report	?	Referee: ?

30 May 1895	Bushwick Athletic Club	4-2	Olympic Athletic Club	?
	?	Report	?	Referee: ?

30 May 1895	Peerless Athletic Club	2-5	Glendale Athletic Club	?
	?	Report	?	Referee: ?

30 May 1895	Peerless Athletic Club	6-5	Ridgewood Athletic Club	?
	?	Report	?	Referee: ?

30 May 1895	Atlantic Athletic Club	8-3	Bay View Athletic Club	?
	?	Report	?	Referee: ?

30 May 1895	Glendale Athletic Club	4-2	Bay View Athletic Club	?
	?	Report	?	Referee: ?

30 May 1895	Hamilton Athletic Club	8-4	Empire Athletic Club	?
	?	Report	?	Referee: ?

30 May 1895	Ridgewood Athletic Club	6-1	Newtown Athletic Club	?
	?	Report	?	Referee: ?

For reasons unknown, the league's Executive Committee ordered all the game from May 30 to be played over again the next day. The replay results have not been found.

=== Round 25 ===
2 June 1895	Atlantic Athletic Club	4-3	Glendale Athletic Club	?
	J. Lynch; O'Brien; Reilley; Wood	Report	Gordon; Lawrence; Zahler	Referee: Edward J Woodman (Dauntless A C)

2 June 1895	Atlantic Athletic Club	5-3	Woodside Athletic Club	?
	Fielding; Hannigan; O'Neill; McMahon; Reilley	Report	Batchelor; Keilier; Hastings	Referee: James H Grant (Glendale A C)

2 June 1895	Ridgewood Athletic Club	5-4	Bushwick Athletic Club	?
	Sloane; Harrison; McCormick; Carter; Hogan	Report	Winters; Heffermann; H. Schleuter; Ellermann	Referee: Edward J Woodman (Dauntless A C)

2 June 1895	Hamilton Athletic Club	3-6	Woodside Athletic Club	?
	Martin; Hennessey; Powell	Report	Hankins (2); Leonard; Parsons; Shaw; Louis	Referee: Andrew J MacDonald (Empire A C)

== Final standings ==
Here are the final standings as calculated from the above matches. This includes the results from May 30.

Pos	Club	P	W	D	L
1	Atlantic Athletic Club	26	22	1	3
2	Glendale Athletic Club	25	21	1	3
3	Ridgewood Athletic Club	25	21	0	4
4	Woodside Athletic Club	26	20	2	4
5	Bushwick Athletic Club	25	17	1	7
6	Hamilton Athletic Club	25	8	1	16
7	Dauntless Athletic Club	24	8	0	16
8	Peerless Athletic Club	24	7	0	17
9	Olympic Athletic Club	24	6	1	17
10	Bay View Athletic Club	24	6	0	18
11	Empire Athletic Club	24	6	0	18
12	Newtown Athletic Club	24	2	1	21

Here are the final standings as they appeared in the New York Sun on 3 June 1895.

Pos	Club	P	W	L
1	Atlantic Athletic Club	25	22	3
2	Glendale Athletic Club	25	21	4
3	Woodside Athletic Club	25	21	4
4	Ridgewood Athletic Club	25	20	5
5	Hamilton Athletic Club	25	10	15
6	Bushwick Athletic Club	25	14	11
7	Bay View Athletic Club	24	9	15
8	Olympic Athletic Club	24	8	16
9	Peerless Athletic Club	24	8	16
10	Dauntless Athletic Club	24	7	17
11	Empire Athletic Club	24	6	18
12	Newtown Athletic Club	24	7	17
