= Herman Pitz =

American baseball player (1865–1924)

- Catcher
- Born: July 18, 1865; Brooklyn, New York, U.S.
- Died: September 3, 1924 (aged 59); Far Rockaway, New York, U.S.
- Batted: Unknown Threw: Unknown

MLB debut
- April 18, 1890, for the Brooklyn Gladiators

Last MLB appearance
- October 12, 1890, for the Syracuse Stars

MLB statistics
- Batting average: .165
- Home runs: 0
- Runs batted in: 9
- Stats at Baseball Reference

Teams
- Brooklyn Gladiators (1890); Syracuse Stars (1890)

Herman Pitz (July 18, 1865 – September 3, 1924) was a 19th-century American Major League Baseball player. Primarily a catcher, he also played third base and outfield with the Syracuse Stars and Brooklyn Gladiators of the American Association in 1890. He remained active in minor league baseball through 1895.

While playing minor league baseball in the Southern Tier of New York, Pitz helped get young John McGraw and Wee Willie Keeler into baseball.
