= Plainfield Crescent Cities =

- 1891–1892; Plainfield, New Jersey

Minor league affiliations
- Class: Independent (1891–1892)
- League: Central New Jersey League (1891–1892)

Major league affiliations
- Team: None

Minor league titles
- League titles (2): 1891*; 1892

Team data
- Name: Plainfield Crescent Cities (1891–1892)
- Ballpark: Crescent League Base Ball Grounds

The Plainfield Crescent Cities were a minor league baseball team based in Plainfield, New Jersey. In 1891 and 1892, the Crescent Cities teams played exclusively as members of the Central New Jersey League, reportedly winning championships in both Seasons. Plainfield hosted home minor league games at the Crescent League Base Ball Grounds.

Baseball Hall of Fame member Willie Keeler played for the Plainfield Crescent Cities in 1891 and 1892, leading the league in hitting in 1891.

== History ==
Minor league baseball play began in Plainfield, New Jersey in 1891. The Plainfield Crescent Cities began play when the Central New Jersey League was formed for the 1891 season as an Independent level minor league. The Westfield and Somerville teams were also among the teams in the league, with statistics of the 1891 season unknown. It was reported that Plainfield won the championship. Baseball Hall of Fame member Willie Keeler played as a member of the 1891 Plainfield team and reportedly helped lead the Crescent Cities to the championship. Keeler hit .376 to lead the league while making $60.00 per month.

The Plainfield Crescent Cities continued play in the four–team 1892 Central New Jersey League. Plainfield began play in the Independent level league on May 26, 1892. The Crescent Cities joined the Elizabeth team from Elizabeth, New Jersey, the Somerville West Ends from Somerville, New Jersey and Westfield Athletics from Westfield, New Jersey in league play.

The season concluded on September 24, 1892, with Plainfield tied for first place, playing under managers Charles Reed and Tom Keller. The Elizabeth and Westfield franchises both disbanded on September 3, 1892, with 5–11 records. The Plainfield Crescent Cities and Somerville West Ends were in a tie for first place with 12–6 records. However, Plainfield disbanded before a playoff with Somerville could be played.

Willie Keeler continued play as a member of the 1892 Plainfield Crescent Cities, at age 20. Keeler left the Plainfield team in June to join Birmingham of the Eastern League before making his major league debut later in the 1892 season. Keeler debuted with the New York Giants on September 30, 1892 at the Polo Grounds.

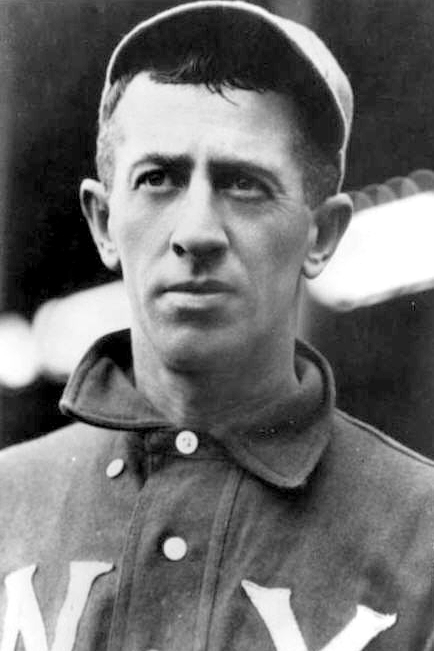
Willie Keeler, 1903

Before his release from the team in August 1892, Crescent Cities player Willie Murphy started and operated a shooting gallery in Plainfield.

The Central New Jersey League permanently folded following the 1892 season. Plainfield has not hosted another minor league team.

On February 21, 1910, Plainfield fans held a banquet and reception for Willie Keeler at the Hotel Iroquis in Plainfield, presenting him with a silver cup. In a speech, Keeler expressed he was thankful for the support of the Plainfield fans and the franchise for being supportive and offering assistance in his career advancement.

== The ballpark ==
The Plainfield Crescent Cities teams were noted to have played minor league home games at the Crescent League Base Ball Grounds. At the time, the ballpark was located at Somerset Street & Grandview Avenue in Plainfield, New Jersey.

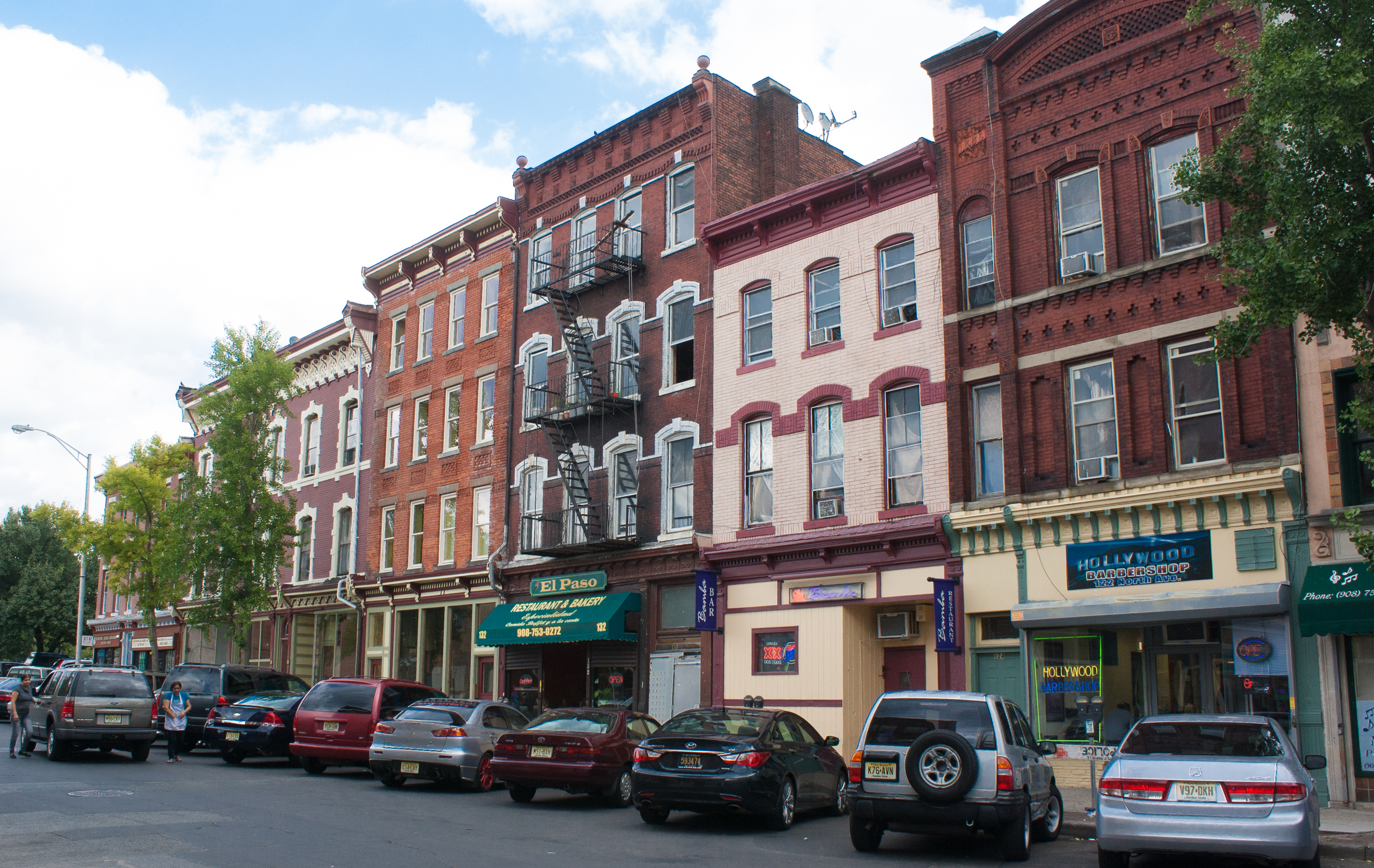
(2014) North Avenue Commercial District, National Register of Historic Places. Plainfield, New Jersey

== Timeline ==
Year(s)	# Yrs.	Team	Level	League	Ballpark
1891–1892	2	Plainfield Crescent Cities	Independent	Central New Jersey League	Crescent League Baseball Grounds

== Year–by–year records ==
Year	Record	Finish	Manager	Playoffs/Notes
1891	00–00	1st*	NA	League records unknown
1892	22–11	1st	Charles Reed / Tom Keller	Tie. No playoff held

== Notable alumni ==
- Willie Keeler (1891–1892) Inducted Baseball Hall of Fame, 1939
- Tuck Turner (1892)
- Bob Murphy (1892)
- Willie Murphy (1892)

== See also ==
- Plainfield Crescent Cities players
