= Jim Powers (baseball) =

American baseball player (born 1868)

- Pitcher
- Born: 1868; New York City
- Died: Unknown
- Batted: Unknown Threw: Unknown

MLB debut
- April 18, 1890, for the Brooklyn Gladiators

Last MLB appearance
- May 11, 1890, for the Brooklyn Gladiators

MLB statistics
- Win–loss record: 1–2
- Earned run average: 5.70
- Strikeouts: 3
- Stats at Baseball Reference

Teams
- Brooklyn Gladiators (1890)

James T. Powers (1868 – after 1890) was a 19th-century Major League Baseball player who was a pitcher for the 1890 Brooklyn Gladiators in the American Association.
