= August Williams =

August Williams may refer to:

- Gus Williams (outfielder) (1888–1964), American baseball player
- August Getty (born 1994), American fashion designer

== See also ==
- Augustine Williams (disambiguation)
- Gus Williams (disambiguation)
