= Fred Siefke =

American baseball player (1870–1893)

- Third baseman
- Born: March 27, 1870; New York, New York
- Died: April 18, 1893 (aged 23); New York, New York
- Batted: Unknown Threw: Unknown

MLB debut
- May 2, 1890, for the Brooklyn Gladiators

Last MLB appearance
- June 1, 1890, for the Brooklyn Gladiators

MLB statistics
- Batting average: .138
- Games played: 16
- Hits: 8
- Stats at Baseball Reference

Teams
- Brooklyn Gladiators (1890)

Frederick Edwin Siefke (March 27, 1870 – April 18, 1893) was an American Major League Baseball player from New York City.

== Career ==
Siefke's only season consisted of 16 games at third base for the 1890 Brooklyn Gladiators during their one and only season in the American Association. In 58 at bats, he collected eight hits for a .138 batting average that included two doubles and one run scored.

== Post-career ==
Siefke died at the age of 23 of Bright's disease in New York City, and is buried in Green-Wood Cemetery in Brooklyn, New York.
