= Peter Connell (baseball) =

American baseball player (1862–1892)

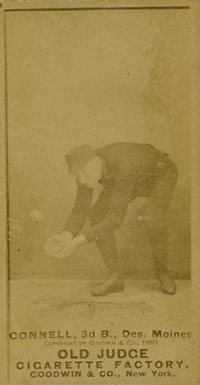
- Third baseman
- Born: 1862; Brooklyn, New York, U.S.
- Died: May 5, 1892 (aged 29–30); Brooklyn, New York, U.S.
- Batted: Unknown Threw: Unknown

MLB debut
- September 3, 1886, for the New York Metropolitans

Last MLB appearance
- May 5, 1890, for the Brooklyn Gladiators

MLB statistics
- At bats: 45
- RBI: 3
- Home runs: 0
- Batting average: .200
- Stats at Baseball Reference

Teams
- New York Metropolitans (1886); Brooklyn Gladiators (1890)

Peter J. Connell (1862 – May 5, 1892) was an American professional baseball player. He played in one game for the 1886 New York Metropolitans and in 11 games for the 1890 Brooklyn Gladiators, both in the American Association.
