= Jim Toy (baseball) =

American baseball player (1858–1919)

- First baseman / Catcher
- Born: February 20, 1858; Beaver Falls, Pennsylvania, US
- Died: March 13, 1919 (aged 61); Cresson, Pennsylvania, US
- Batted: Unknown Threw: Unknown

MLB debut
- April 20, 1887, for the Cleveland Blues

Last MLB appearance
- July 30, 1890, for the Brooklyn Gladiators

MLB statistics
- Batting average: .211
- Runs scored: 67
- RBIs: 63
- Stats at Baseball Reference

Teams
- Cleveland Blues (1887); Brooklyn Gladiators (1890)

James Madison Toy (February 20, 1858 – March 13, 1919) was an early American Major League Baseball player, possibly with Native American ancestry, who had a short two-year career with the Cleveland Blues and the Brooklyn Gladiators, both of the American Association.

== Career ==
Born in Beaver Falls, Pennsylvania, Toy began his professional baseball career in the International League for the Utica, New York team. He showed his versatility by playing many different positions, as well as having a well known good throwing arm. He helped lead the Utica team to the International League championship in 1886.

This showing earned him a spot on the Cleveland Blues for the 1887 season, where he played in 109 games, batted .222, and played mainly at first base, but again showed his ability at other positions, including catcher, and all three outfield positions.

Toy played minor league baseball in Brooklyn, New York for the 1889 and 1890 seasons, mainly as a catcher. He joined the Gladiators later that season, playing in 44 games, batting .181, and gathering only seven RBI. His career ended after suffering an injury when he was hit with a foul tip in the groin. Because of the lack of modern medical attention, the injury plagued him throughout the rest of his life along with cutting his career short.

== Death ==
Toy died at the age of 61 in Cresson, Pennsylvania, and is interred at Beaver Cemetery in Beaver, Pennsylvania.

== Claims of Native American ancestry ==
According to writer Ed Rice, Louis Sockalexis was the first American Indian player in major league baseball. In 1963, baseball writer Lee Allen claimed, without solid evidence, that Toy's father was Lakota. This claim was disputed by Rice, who located Toy's death certificate listing his race as "white".

Modern historians have become less worried about whether the player is a "full-blooded" Native American, but rather if the player identified and aligned himself socially and culturally with his native people. Sockalexis fits this view of history, while Toy did not.
