= Frank Fennelly =

American baseball player (1860–1920)

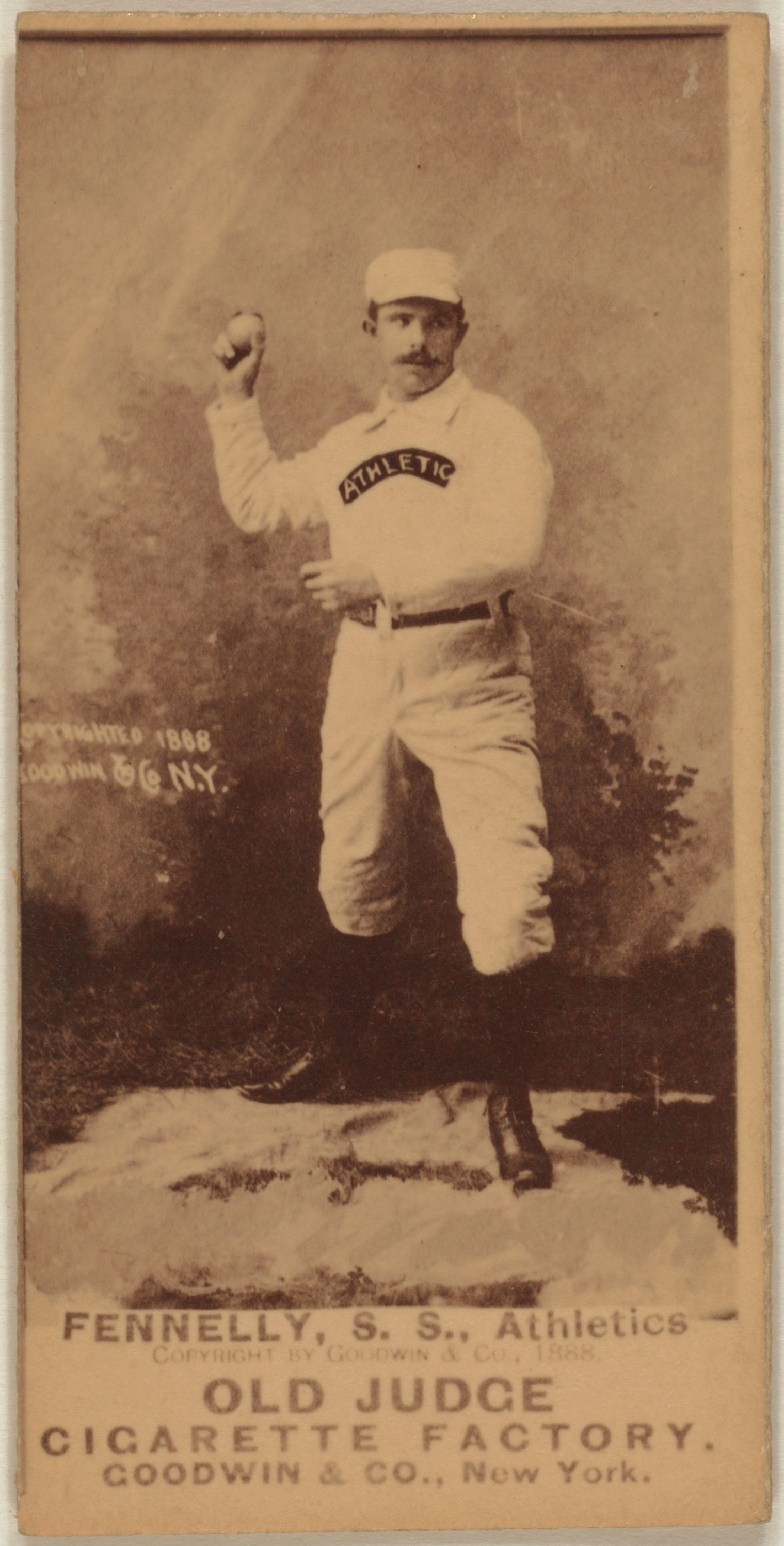
- Shortstop
- Born: February 18, 1860; Fall River, Massachusetts, U.S.
- Died: August 14, 1920 (aged 60); Fall River, Massachusetts, U.S.
- Batted: Right Threw: Right

MLB debut
- May 1, 1884, for the Washington Nationals

Last MLB appearance
- June 18, 1890, for the Brooklyn Gladiators

MLB statistics
- Batting average: .257
- Home runs: 34
- Runs batted in: 408
- Stolen bases: 175
- Stats at Baseball Reference

Teams
- Washington Nationals (1884); Cincinnati Red Stockings (1884–1888); Philadelphia Athletics (1888–1889); Brooklyn Gladiators (1890)

Career highlights and awards
- American Association RBI champion: 1885

Francis John Fennelly (February 18, 1860 – August 4, 1920) was a 19th-century American Major League Baseball shortstop. He played his entire career for American Association teams: the Washington Nationals (1884), Cincinnati Red Stockings (1884–1888), Philadelphia Athletics (1888–1889), and Brooklyn Gladiators (1890). He stood 5 ft 8 in (1.73 m) (1.73 m) and weighed 168 pounds (76.5 kg).

In his rookie season of 1884 he hit .311, good for eighth in the league, and his .367 on-base percentage ranked fourth. He led the league in games played (112) and runs batted in (89) in 1885.

Fennelly finished in the league Top Ten twice for runs and slugging percentage, three times for home runs and RBI, four times for triples, and five times for bases on balls.

The best team he ever played for was the 1887 Red Stockings, who had a record of 81–54 (.600) and finished second in the league, 14 games behind the St. Louis Browns.

Career totals for 786 games played include 781 hits, 34 home runs, 408 RBI, 609 runs scored, and a batting average of .257.

His career OPS+ (118) and Win Shares per 162 games (25.35) are both better than Derek Jeter.

Fennelly died and was buried in his hometown of Fall River, Massachusetts at the age of 60.

== See also ==
- List of Major League Baseball annual runs batted in leaders
- List of Major League Baseball career stolen bases leaders
