= Charlie McCullough =

Irish baseball player (1866–1898)

- Pitcher
- Born: 1866; Dublin, Ireland
- Died: April 13, 1898; Brooklyn, New York, U.S.
- Batted: Unknown Threw: Unknown

MLB debut
- April 23, 1890, for the Brooklyn Gladiators

Last MLB appearance
- August 29, 1890, for the Syracuse Stars

MLB statistics
- Win–loss record: 5–23
- Strikeouts: 69
- Earned run average: 4.88
- Stats at Baseball Reference

Teams
- Brooklyn Gladiators (1890); Syracuse Stars (1890)

Charles F. McCullough (1866 – April 13, 1898) was an Irish born Major League Baseball pitcher for one season. In 1890 he played for the Brooklyn Gladiators and the Syracuse Stars, both of the American Association. He was a native of Dublin, Ireland.

He did complete 27 out of 28 starts in the 1890 season, but allowed 406 baserunners (276 hits, 116 walks, and 13 hit batsmen) in 241.2 innings pitched. He also threw 21 wild pitches, seventh in the league. His earned run average was 4.88, which was a full run over the league average, and his record was 5–23.

At the plate he was 3–for–95 (.032) with one run batted in and three runs scored. He drew six walks, increasing his on-base percentage to .089. On defense, he had a fielding percentage of .885, below the league's average of .907 for pitchers.
