= Guy Williams =

Guy Williams may refer to:

- Sir Guy Williams (British Army officer) (1881–1959), British Army general during World War II
- Guy Williams (politician) (1907–1992), Canadian Senator and First Nations leader
- Guy Williams (actor) (1924–1989), American actor and former fashion model
- Guy Williams (basketball) (born 1960), American basketball player, nicknamed "The Fly"
- Guy Williams (equestrian) (born 1971), British international showjumper
- Guy Williams (rugby league) (born 1984), Australian rugby league player
- Guy Williams (comedian) (born 1987), New Zealand comedian and television personality
- Guy Williams (visual effects), Academy Award-nominated visual effects supervisor
- R. Guy Williams, model railway locomotive modeller, known for his contributions to the Pendon Museum

== See also ==
- Gus Williams (disambiguation)
