= Jim Kennedy (baseball manager) =

American baseball manager

- Manager
- Born: April 1862 (Note: Kennedy's exact date of birth is unknown.); New York City, US
- Died: April 20, 1904 (aged 41–42); Brooklyn, New York, US

MLB statistics
- Games managed: 100 (Note: Kennedy managed the team in 100 games, as one game ended as a tie, which is excluded from baseball win–loss statistics.)
- Managerial record: 26–73
- Winning percentage: .263
- Stats at Baseball Reference
- Managerial record at Baseball Reference

Teams
- Brooklyn Gladiators (1890)

James C. Kennedy (April 1862 – April 20, 1904) was a 19th-century manager in professional baseball. He managed the Brooklyn Gladiators of the American Association, considered a major league, during the 1890 season.

== Biography ==
Kennedy was born in New York City in April 1862; as a young man he worked for The New York Times, becoming a baseball reporter; by 1884, he was also an official scorer. He served as the secretary of the Central League, a minor league that only played one season, 1888. Outside of baseball, Kennedy helped organize some racewalking events.

One effect of the formation of the short-lived Players' League in 1890 was that the American Association needed an eighth team—Kennedy was able to secure a franchise, for which he served as the team's manager. The Brooklyn Gladiators, despite the name, actually played home games at ballparks in Queens and northern Manhattan. The team, using mainly older players or players released from other teams, had a record of 26–73, a .263 winning percentage. The Gladiators did not finish the season, as they disbanded in late August and were replaced by the Baltimore Orioles.

After his brief time with the Gladiators, Kennedy became involved in staging bicycle races and boxing matches. He died in April 1904 from a heart attack, likely related to his obesity, while en route from his home in Brooklyn to Manhattan via train.
