= Tony Murphy (baseball) =

American baseball player (1859–1915)

- Catcher
- Born: July 1859; New York, New York, U.S.
- Died: December 15, 1915 (aged 56); New York, New York, U.S.
- Batted: Unknown Threw: Unknown

MLB debut
- October 15, 1884, for the New York Metropolitans

Last MLB appearance
- October 15, 1884, for the New York Metropolitans

MLB statistics
- Batting average: .333
- Home runs: 0
- Runs batted in: 0
- Stats at Baseball Reference

Teams
- New York Metropolitans (1884)

Francis J. "Tony" Murphy (July 1859 – December 15, 1915) was an American Association catcher who played for the 1884 New York Metropolitans. He appeared in one game on October 15, 1884 and recorded one hit and one run in three at-bats. He remained in the minor leagues through 1889, playing primarily in the Connecticut State League and the New England League.

In July 1883, Murphy became the first professional baseball player to use William Gray's patented inflatable chest protector. Although mocked "unmercifully" for protecting himself, Murphy's adoption of the chest guard eventually made overhand pitching safe and widespread.
