= Hi Church =

American baseball player (1863–1926)

- Outfielder
- Born: November 23, 1863; Central Square, New York, U.S.
- Died: February 23, 1926 (aged 62); Jacksonville, Florida, U.S.
- Batted: Unknown Threw: Unknown

MLB debut
- August 2, 1890, for the Brooklyn Gladiators

Last MLB appearance
- August 25, 1890, for the Brooklyn Gladiators

MLB statistics
- At bats: 9
- RBI: 0
- Home runs: 0
- Batting average: .111
- Stats at Baseball Reference

Teams
- Brooklyn Gladiators (1890)

Hiram Lincoln Church (November 23, 1863 – February 23, 1926) was an American baseball player. He played for the 1890 Brooklyn Gladiators in the American Association. He also played college ball at Syracuse University.
