= Darby O'Brien =

American baseball player (1863–1893)

- Outfielder
- Born: September 1, 1863; Peoria, Illinois, U.S.
- Died: June 15, 1893 (aged 29); Peoria, Illinois, U.S.
- Batted: Right Threw: Right

MLB debut
- April 16, 1887, for the New York Metropolitans

Last MLB appearance
- October 15, 1892, for the Brooklyn Grooms

MLB statistics
- Batting average: .282
- Hits: 805
- Runs: 577
- Stats at Baseball Reference

Teams
- New York Metropolitans (1887); Brooklyn Bridegrooms/Grooms (1888–1892)

William D. "Darby" O'Brien (September 1, 1863 – June 15, 1893) was an American Major League Baseball player in the late 19th century. He played outfield for the New York Metropolitans in 1887 and the Brooklyn Bridegrooms/Grooms from 1888–1892. O'Brien developed lung problems during his playing career and continued to play, despite his ill health. When he reported to spring training for the 1893 season, the team found that he was too ill to play and sent him to Colorado to try to recover. They played a benefit game to raise money for him.

In 709 games over six seasons, O'Brien posted a .282 batting average (805-for-2856) with 577 runs, 20 home runs, 394 runs batted in, 321 stolen bases and 231 bases on balls. He finished his career with a .933 fielding percentage.

O'Brien died later that year of typhoid fever at the age of 29.

== See also ==
- List of Major League Baseball career stolen bases leaders
- List of Major League Baseball single-game hits leaders
