= Ed Daily =

American baseball player (1862–1891)

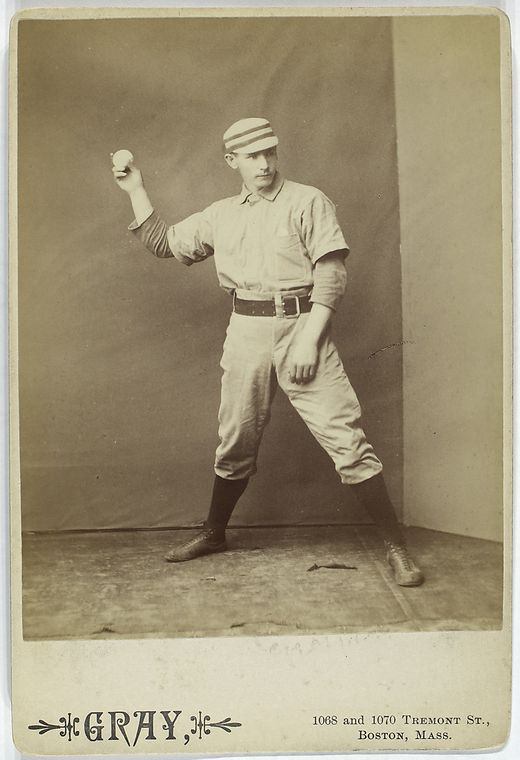
- Outfielder / Pitcher
- Born: September 7, 1862; Providence, Rhode Island, U.S.
- Died: October 21, 1891 (aged 29); Washington, D.C., U.S.
- Batted: Right Threw: Right

MLB debut
- May 4, 1885, for the Philadelphia Quakers

Last MLB appearance
- July 14, 1891, for the Washington Statesmen

MLB statistics
- Batting average: .239
- Home runs: 19
- Runs batted in: 288
- Win–loss record: 66–70
- Earned run average: 3.39
- Strikeouts: 407
- Stats at Baseball Reference

Teams
- Philadelphia Quakers (1885–1887); Washington Nationals (1887–1888); Columbus Solons (1889); Brooklyn Gladiators (1890); New York Giants (1890); Louisville Colonels (1890–1891); Washington Statesmen (1891)

Edward M. Daily (September 7, 1862 – October 21, 1891) was an American Major League Baseball player. He played seven seasons in the majors, from 1885 until 1891, for the Philadelphia Phillies, Washington Nationals, Columbus Solons, Brooklyn Gladiators, New York Giants, Louisville Colonels, and Washington Statesmen.

Daily began his Major League career as a pitcher for the Philadelphia Quakers in 1885. He won 26 games, fifth in the National League. In 1886, he went 16–9, but was already starting to play more often as an outfielder, appearing in 56 games in the outfield and batting .227. From 1887 until 1889, he was almost exclusively an outfielder, but in 1890 he pitched in 41 games for three teams, winning 18 games. He played part of one more season in the majors and retired due to poor health and opened a saloon. Shortly after the end of the season, he died of consumption.

== See also ==
- List of Major League Baseball career stolen bases leaders
