= Jumbo Davis =

American baseball player (1861–1921)

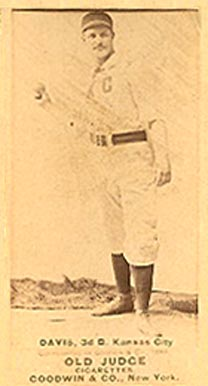
- Third baseman
- Born: September 5, 1861; New York City, New York, U.S.
- Died: February 14, 1921 (aged 59); St. Louis, Missouri, U.S.
- Batted: Left Threw: Right

MLB debut
- July 27, 1884, for the Kansas City Cowboys

Last MLB appearance
- May 22, 1891, for the Washington Statesmen

MLB statistics
- Batting average: .272
- Hits: 468
- Runs batted in: 270
- Stats at Baseball Reference

Teams
- Kansas City Cowboys (UA) (1884); Baltimore Orioles (1886–1887); Kansas City Cowboys (AA) (1888–1889); St. Louis Browns (1889–1890); Brooklyn Gladiators (1890); Washington Statesmen (1891)

Career highlights and awards
- American Association triples leader in 1887

James J. "Jumbo" Davis (September 5, 1861 – February 14, 1921) was an American Major League Baseball third baseman. He played all or part of seven seasons in the majors, between 1884 and 1891, for the Brooklyn Gladiators, St. Louis Browns, Baltimore Orioles, Washington Statesmen, and two different Kansas City Cowboys teams, one in the Union Association and the other in the American Association.

== See also ==
- List of Major League Baseball annual triples leaders
- List of Major League Baseball players to hit for the cycle

Achievements
Preceded by Bill Van Dyke	Hitting for the cycle July 18, 1890	Succeeded by Roger Connor
