= Jack Lynch (baseball) =

American baseball player (1857–1923)

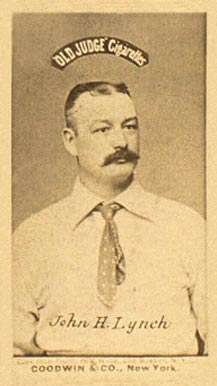
- Pitcher
- Born: February 5, 1857; New York City, New York, U.S.
- Died: April 20, 1923 (aged 66); Bronx, New York, U.S.
- Batted: Right Threw: Right

MLB debut
- May 2, 1881, for the Buffalo Bisons

Last MLB appearance
- April 19, 1890, for the Brooklyn Gladiators

MLB statistics
- Win–loss record: 110-105
- Earned run average: 3.69
- Strikeouts: 859
- Stats at Baseball Reference

Teams
- Buffalo Bisons (1881); New York Metropolitans (1883–1887); Brooklyn Gladiators (1890)

Career highlights and awards
- American Association pennant: 1884

John H. Lynch (February 5, 1857 – April 20, 1923) was an American Major League Baseball pitcher from 1881 to 1890. He played for the Buffalo Bisons, New York Metropolitans, and Brooklyn Gladiators.

His pitch selection included a drop curve and an "inshoot", which was probably the modern screwball.

The New York Clipper wrote of Jack Lynch:

Studying the in-and-out curves, rises, and drop deliveries, he rapidly acquired a reputation as an effective and puzzling pitcher...He has complete control of the ball, with all the curves and varying paces in delivery, and is cool and self-possessed.
