= Joe Gerhardt =

American baseball player (1855–1922)

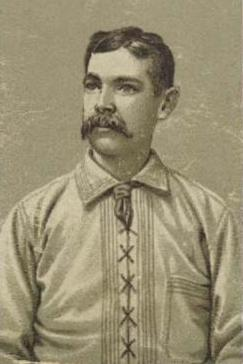
- Second baseman
- Born: February 14, 1855; Washington, D.C., U.S.
- Died: March 11, 1922 (aged 67); Middletown, Orange County, New York, U.S.
- Batted: Right Threw: Right

MLB debut
- September 1, 1873, for the Washington Nationals

Last MLB appearance
- April 29, 1891, for the Louisville Colonels

MLB statistics
- Batting average: .227
- Home runs: 7
- Runs batted in: 382
- Stats at Baseball Reference

Teams
- As player: Washington Blue Legs (1873); Baltimore Canaries (1874); New York Mutuals (1875); Louisville Grays (1876–1877); Cincinnati Reds (1878–1879); Detroit Wolverines (1881); Louisville Eclipse (1883–1884); New York Giants (1885–1887); New York Metropolitans (1887); Brooklyn Gladiators (1890); St. Louis Browns (1890); Louisville Colonels (1891); As manager: Louisville Eclipse (1883); St. Louis Browns (1890)

John Joseph Gerhardt (February 14, 1855 – March 11, 1922) was an American professional baseball second baseman whose career spanned from 1873 to 1893. He played 15 seasons in Major League Baseball (MLB) for 11 major league clubs.

== Early years ==
Gerhardt was born in 1855 in Washington, D.C. His father, Joseph Gerhardt, was an immigrant from Prussia who was in the restaurant business and was a Colonel in the Union Army during the American Civil War. His mother, Dorah, was an immigrant from the Hesse Cassel, which is now part of Germany.

== Professional baseball ==
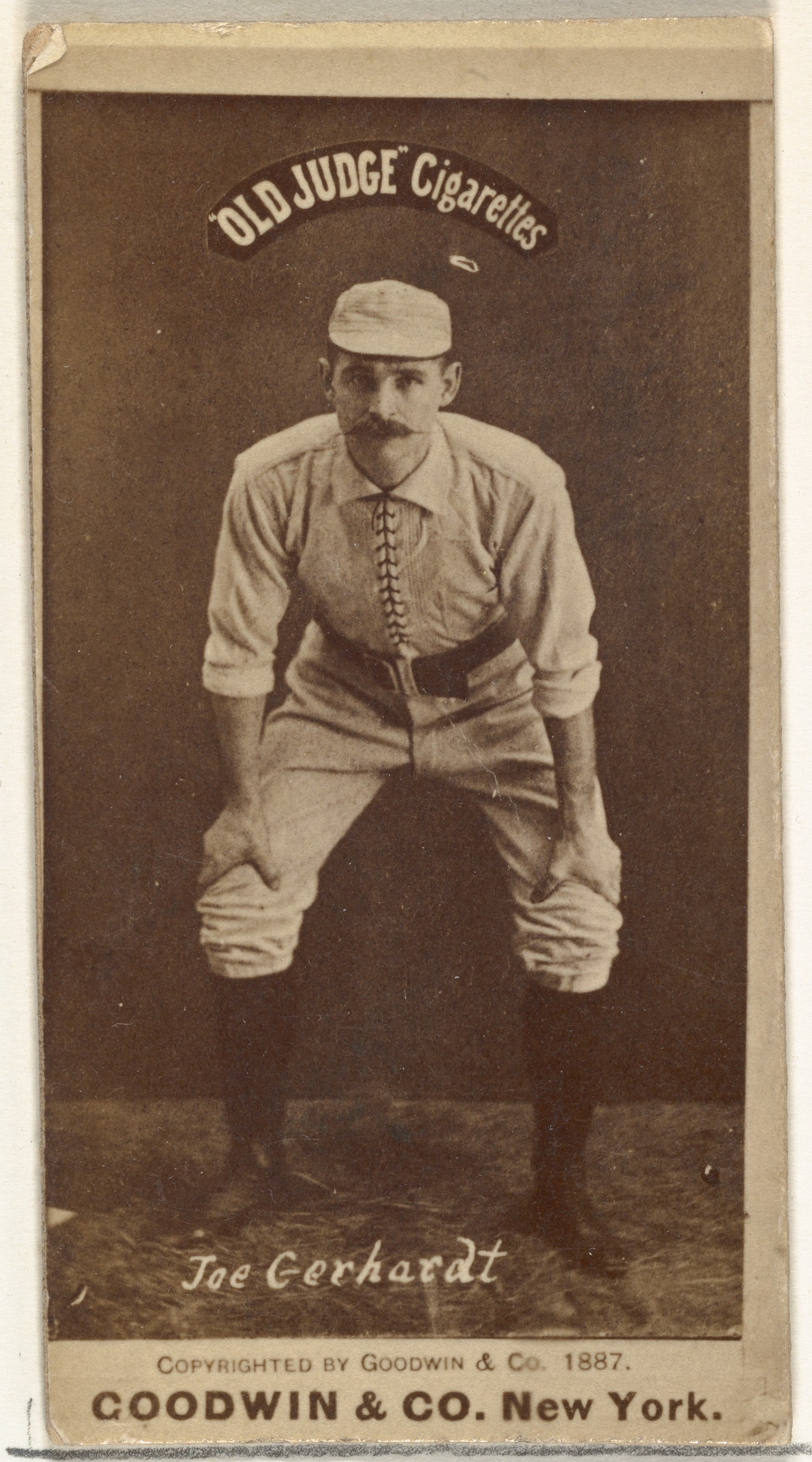
Joe Gerhardt, 1887, Burdick Collection, Metropolitan Museum of Art

Gerhardt played five seasons in Louisville, Kentucky, for the Grays (1876–77), Eclipse (1883–84) and Colonels (1891), and five seasons in New York City for the Mutuals (1875), Giants (1885–87), Metropolitans (1887) and Gladiators (1890). Across all 15 major league seasons, he appeared in 1,078 games, 893 as a second baseman, 85 as a third baseman, 63 as a first baseman, and 33 as a shortstop.

Gerhardt was a weak hitter, compiling a .227 career batting average, but he was known as one of the best defensive second baseman of his era. He twice led his league in assists at any position and regularly ranked among the league leaders in putouts. double plays and fielding percentage by a second baseman between 1877 and 1890. His career range factor of 6.46 remains the highest in major league history for a second baseman. He also ranks eighth among all second basemen in major league history with 558 errors at second base. In a 1922 story on Gerhardt, New York sports writer John M. Foster compared Gerhardt to baseball's other great second basemen and concluded: "None had anything on Move Em Up Joe Gerhardt."

Gerhardt became a player-manager on two occasions: in 1883, for the Louisville Colonels, and in 1890, for the St. Louis Browns. His managerial record totaled 72 wins against 61 losses.

Gerhardt's nickname, "Move 'Em Up Joe" came from his war cry, "Move 'em up", which he would shout from the bench or base line when his teammates were on base. Gerhardt was an early advocate of the sacrifice play to move base runners forward. Upon Gerhardt's death, New York sports writer John M. Foster went so far as to call Gerhardt the "original inventor of the sacrifice theory in baseball."

== Later years ==
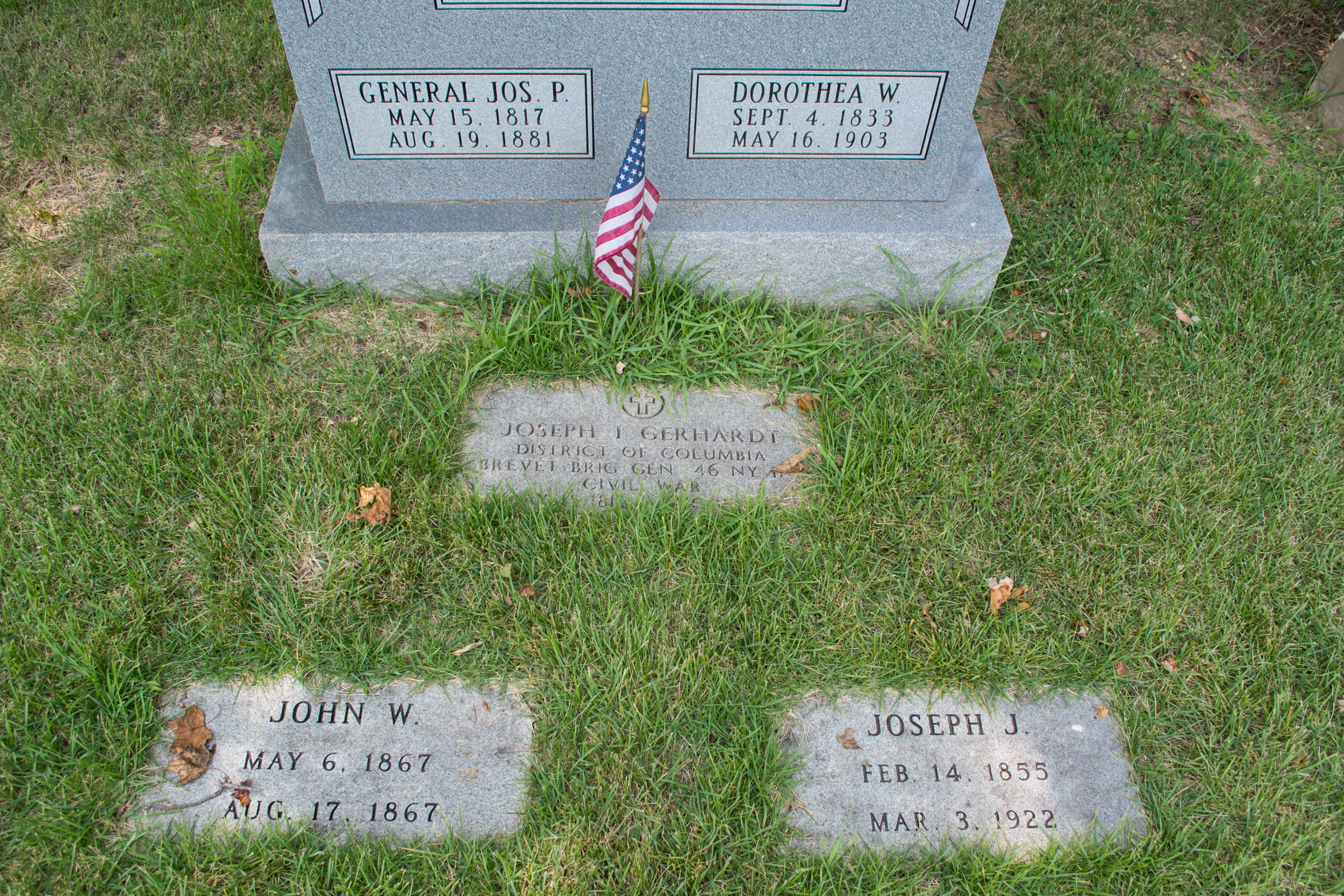
Grave of Joe Gerhardt (lower right), in the Gerhardt family plot at Prospect Hill Cemetery in Washington, D.C.

In 1900, Gerhardt was living in Manhattan with his wife Edith and was employed as a hotel manager. By 1910, Gerhardt and his wife had moved to Liberty, New York, where Gerhardt was the proprietor of a liquor retail business. Gerhardt and his wife at that time had a daughter, Alva, living with them.

Gerhardt later lived in Middletown, Orange County, New York. As of 1919, he was employed in N. D. Mills' cigar store. At the time of the 1920 Census, he was living in Middletown with his wife, Edith, and daughter, Alva, and was employed as a salesman in a cigar store.

Gerhardt died from a sudden heart attack in Middletown at age 67. The attack reportedly struck him in front of the Middletown post office as he was walking to work after having been ill for a week. He was buried at Prospect Hill Cemetery in Washington, D.C.

== See also ==
- List of Major League Baseball player–managers
