= Ridgewood Park (baseball ground) =

Baseball ground in Queens, New York, US

- Wallace Grounds
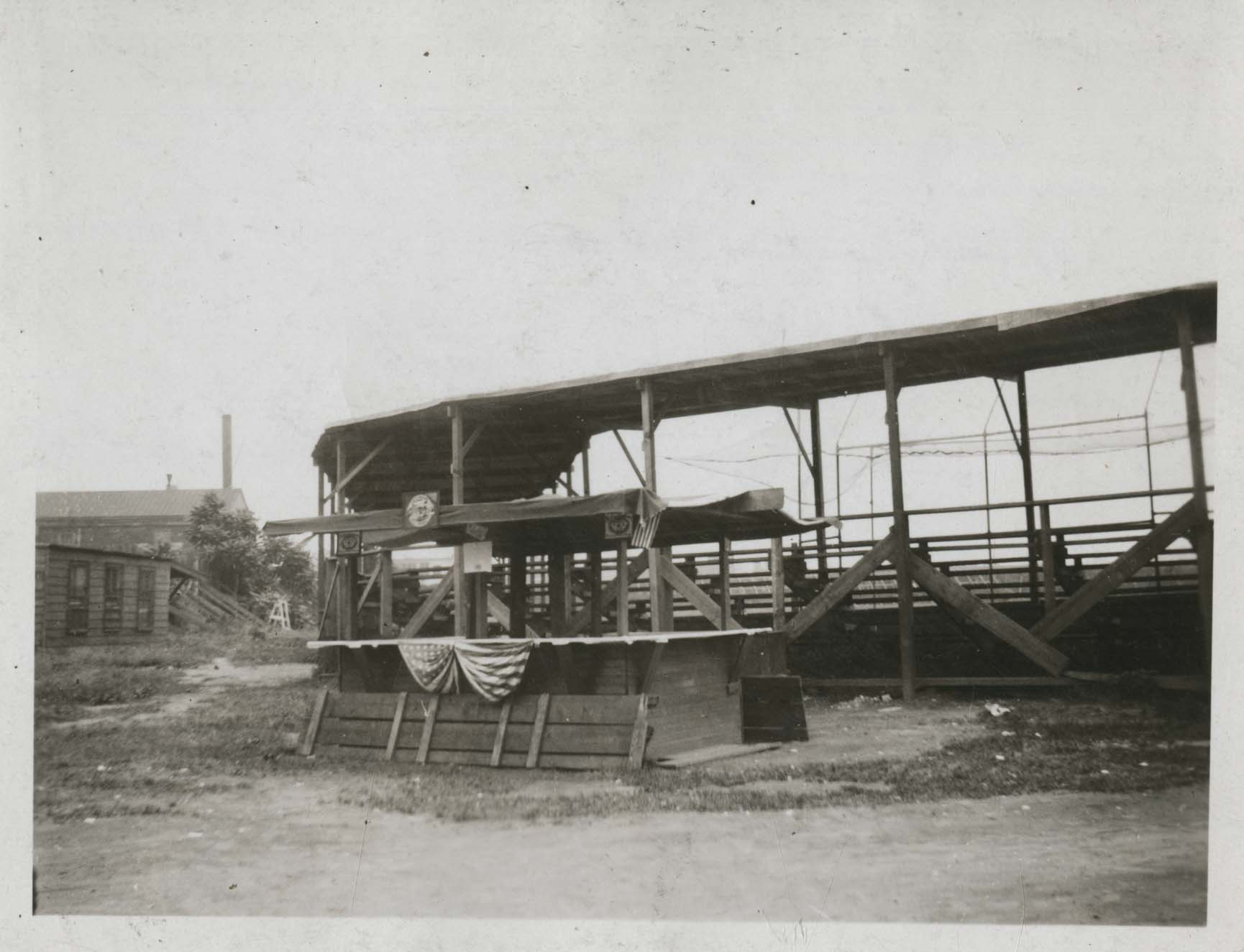
- Ridgewood Park Grandstand, 1922
- Interactive map of Ridgewood Park (baseball ground)
- Full name: Wallace's Ridgewood Park
- Location: Wyckoff Avenue, Covert Street, LIRR (Montauk), Halsey Street, Ridgewood, Queens, New York
- Coordinates: 40°41′41″N 73°54′19″W
- Capacity: 10,000
- Surface: grass

Construction
- Opened: 1885

Tenants
- Brooklyn Grays / Bridegrooms (AA) (1887–1889); Brooklyn Gladiators (AA) (1890); Brooklyn Bushwicks (ind.) (1913–1917); Brooklyn Royal Giants (ind.) (1912–1914, 1916–1917)

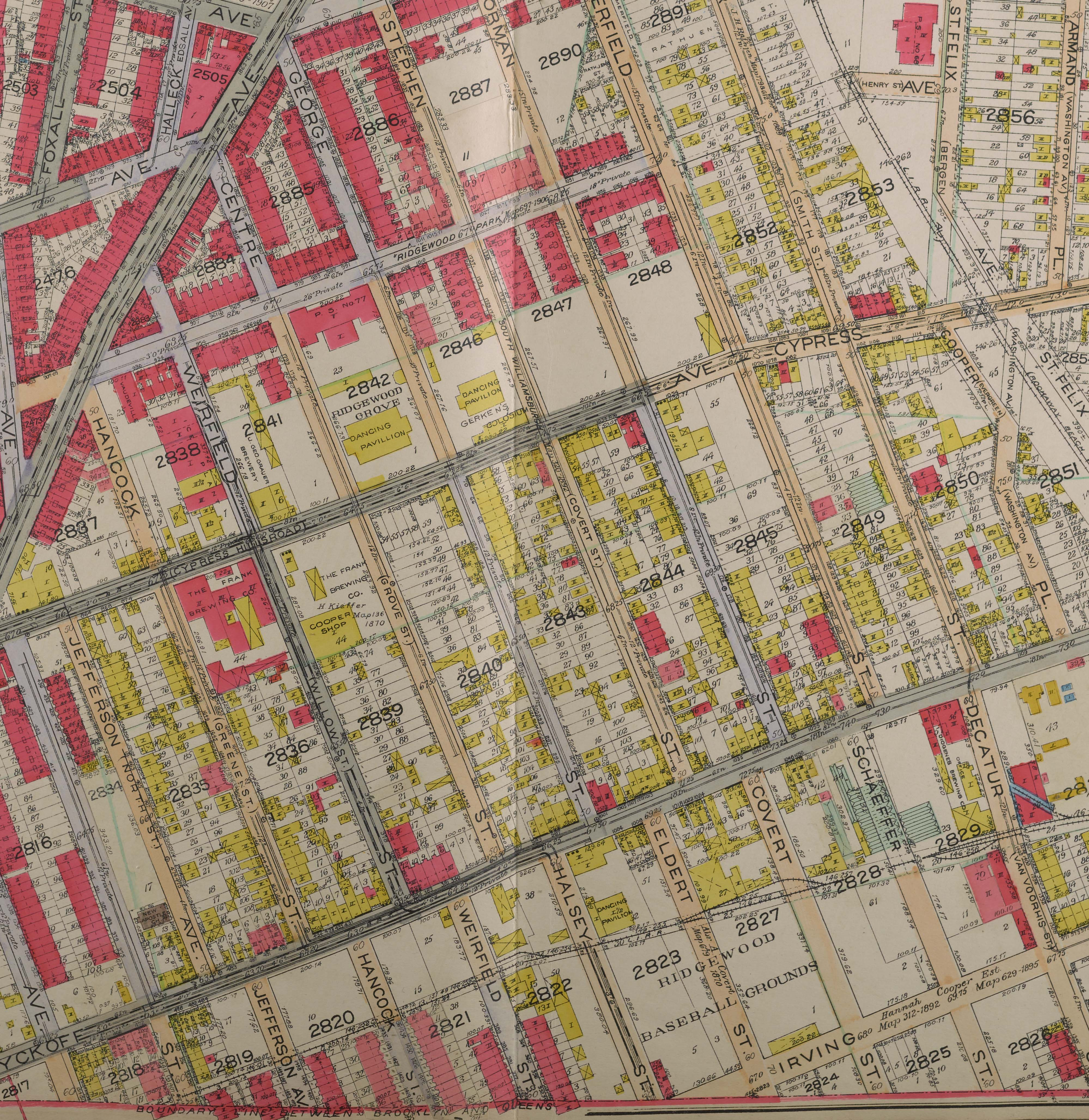
This contemporary map clearly distinguishes the “Ridgewood Baseball Grounds”, near the railroad tracks, from “Ridgewood Grove” (Grauer’s Ridgewood Park) between “J. Geo. Grauer Brewery” and “Gerken’s Colosium”.

Ridgewood Park, also known as Wallace's Ridgewood Park or the Wallace Grounds, and frequently confused with Grauer's Ridgewood Park, was a baseball ground in Ridgewood, Queens, New York. Both Wallace's and Grauer's are shown in Belcher Hyde's Map of Newtown in 1915. The baseball field was part of a larger entertainment area bounded Wyckoff Avenue, Covert Street, Halsey Street, and Irving Avenue. (Halsey Street also bordered the old Capitoline Grounds about 2 miles (3.2 km) west.) The baseball field was southwest of the Long Island Rail Road's Montauk Branch tracks (now a dumpster alley and parking lot between Wyckoff and Irving). Eldert Street, although depicted on the map as running through the baseball grounds, was not cut through southwest of the railroad tracks and the road remains interrupted there today. Originally the park was in Queens County, before its incorporation into New York City in 1899. This facilitated Sunday baseball playing, including the charging of admission, beyond the reach of Sabbath enforcers from the then-city of Brooklyn.

Grauer's Ridgewood Park or Grauer's Woods was a large parkland several blocks north of Wallace's ballpark, bounded by Myrtle Avenue, Cypress Avenue, Seneca Avenue, and Decatur Street. Although some baseball was played here, this area was more of a picnic park. George Schubel in 1913 lyrically describes the pleasures of Grauer's Ridgewood Park: "Here the German families of another generation assembled and enjoyed themselves in innocent recreation very much in the manner that they were accustomed to do across the seas. Most of these parks have been eliminated, owing to the increase in land values and the decline of this sort of amusement." He also notes that "This once beautiful park is now cut up with such streets as Centre Street, George Street, Norman Street, Summerfield Street, and Willow Street, running through the land."

The land that would become Wallace's Ridgewood Park was purchased by William Wallace in 1884. On April 5, 1885, the first game was played between the Brooklyn Atlantics and the Ridgewoods before a reported 3,000 fans. According to Retrosheet, Ridgewood Park was used by the Brooklyn Grays / Bridegrooms from 1887–1889 after they had played some games in the 1886 season at Grauer's. The Dodgers had used it strictly for Sunday games, to get around Brooklyn's blue laws. The Brooklyn Gladiators played their full 1890 schedule at Wallace's. The field was home to the semipro Ridgewoods; later the Brooklyn Bushwicks and the Negro league Brooklyn Royal Giants also played there. The park had a capacity of 10,000 in 1887.

On September 19, 1917, the grandstand burned, precipitating the Bushwicks' move to Dexter Park in 1918. Wallace apparently intended to subdivide the land put it up for sale in that year, but ultimately he would rebuild, and the property was not sold until 1927. Although it was gradually reduced in size, the park survived and hosted soccer and other sports as Grand Stadium until 1959, when it was replaced by industrial buildings.

Grand Stadium once again played host to the Dodgers as a training site in its waning years. The Eagle reported on February 26, 1947, that Branch Rickey "looked refreshed on his arrival at Grand Stadium to watch the 20 who had been tempted [by Mexican promoter Pasquel's contract offers] and 30 other Dodgers go through their long drill." Although this passing reference does not conclusively establish the connection, it seems that the Dodgers returned briefly to their old stomping grounds some 60 years later.

Yet another Ridgewood ballpark was Meyerrose Park, which existed from 1907 through 1911. It was the home of an "outlaw" Brooklyn club for two seasons, in the Atlantic League (1907) and Union League (1908). It was on part of the former Meyerrose Farm, a large block bounded by Myrtle Avenue, Gates Avenue, Covert (now Seneca) Avenue, and Woodward Avenue. After the 1911 season, it was sold to developers, and Onderdonk Avenue was cut through.
