= Gus Williams (pitcher) =

American baseball player (1870–1890)

- Pitcher
- Born: 1870; New York City
- Died: October 14, 1890 (aged 19–20); New York City
- Batted: Unknown Threw: Unknown

MLB debut
- April 18, 1890, for the Brooklyn Gladiators

Last MLB appearance
- April 22, 1890, for the Brooklyn Gladiators

MLB statistics
- Win–loss record: 0-1
- Earned run average: 7.50
- Strikeouts: 2
- Stats at Baseball Reference

Teams
- Brooklyn Gladiators (1890)

Augustine H. Williams (1870 – October 14, 1890) was an American baseball player who was a pitcher for the 1890 Brooklyn Gladiators in the American Association. He died the same year he made his major league appearances.
