= Bob Murphy (pitcher) =

American baseball player (1866–1904)

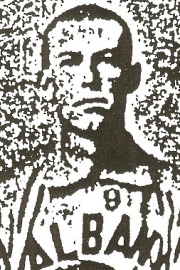
- Pitcher/Outfielder
- Born: December 26, 1866; Dutchess County, New York
- Died: December 13, 1904 (aged 37); Staten Island, New York
- Batted: Unknown Threw: Unknown

MLB debut
- May 27, 1890, for the New York Giants

Last MLB appearance
- August 25, 1890, for the Brooklyn Gladiators

MLB statistics
- Batting average: .169
- Home runs: 1
- Runs batted in: 0

Teams
- New York Giants (1890); Brooklyn Gladiators (1890)

Robert J. Murphy (December 26, 1866 – December 13, 1904) was a pitcher in Major League Baseball in 1890 for the New York Giants and Brooklyn Gladiators.
