= Jack Sharrott =

American baseball player (1869–1927)

- Pitcher / Outfielder
- Born: August 13, 1869; Staten Island, New York, U.S.
- Died: December 31, 1927 (aged 58); Los Angeles, California, U.S.
- Batted: Right Threw: Right

MLB debut
- April 22, 1890, for the New York Giants

Last MLB appearance
- September 30, 1893, for the Philadelphia Phillies

MLB statistics
- Win–loss record: 20–17
- Earned run average: 3.12
- Strikeouts: 137
- Batting average: .237
- Home runs: 2
- Runs batted in: 43
- Stats at Baseball Reference

Teams
- New York Giants (1890–1892); Philadelphia Phillies (1893)

John Henry Sharrott (August 13, 1869 – December 31, 1927) was an American Major League Baseball player. He played in the Majors from 1890 to 1893 and in the minors from 1894 to 1903. He also managed in the minors from 1904 to 1906 in the New York State League and coached at Worcester Polytechnic Institute.

== Sources ==
- Career statistics from Baseball Reference · Retrosheet · Baseball Almanac
