= Willie Keeler =

American baseball player (1872–1923)

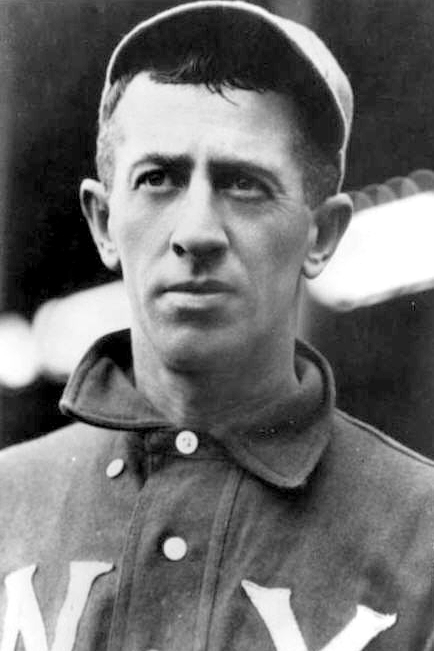
- Keeler, c. 1903
- Right fielder
- Born: March 3, 1872; Brooklyn, New York, U.S.
- Died: January 1, 1923 (aged 50); Brooklyn, New York, U.S.
- Batted: Left Threw: Left

Major league debut
- September 30, 1892, for the New York Giants

Last major league appearance
- September 5, 1910, for the New York Giants

Major league statistics
- Batting average: .341
- Hits: 2,932
- Home runs: 33
- Runs batted in: 810
- Stolen bases: 495
- Stats at Baseball Reference

Teams
- New York Giants (1892–1893); Brooklyn Grooms (1893); Baltimore Orioles (1894–1898); Brooklyn Superbas (1899–1902); New York Highlanders (1903–1909); New York Giants (1910)

Career highlights and awards
- 2× NL batting champion (1897, 1898)

Member of the National

Baseball Hall of Fame
- Induction: 1939
- Vote: 75.5% (fourth ballot)

William Henry Keeler (March 3, 1872 – January 1, 1923), nicknamed "Wee Willie" because of his small stature, was an American professional baseball right fielder who played in the major leagues from 1892 to 1910, primarily for the Baltimore Orioles and Brooklyn Superbas in the National League, and the New York Highlanders in the American League. Keeler was a part of five teams that won the National League pennant (1894–1896, 1899, 1900). One of the greatest contact hitters of all time and notoriously hard to strike out, Keeler has the highest career at bats-per-strikeout ratio in major league history, averaging 63.17 at bats per strikeout. His plate appearance-per-strikeout ratio is also one of the best of all time, with Keeler averaging 70.66 plate appearances between strikeouts, second only to Joe Sewell, another Hall of Famer, who averaged 73.06 plate appearances between each strikeout. In 1939, Keeler was posthumously elected to the National Baseball Hall of Fame.

== Early life ==
William Henry O'Kelleher Jr. (he later Americanized the name to Keeler) was born in Brooklyn, New York, on March 3, 1872, the son of William O'Kelleher Sr., a trolley switch man. He played baseball from an early age, and as a freshman served as captain of his high school team. He quit school the following year, and played semiprofessional baseball in the New York City area.

== Professional baseball career ==
In 1892, after beginning the season playing his second year with the Plainfield Crescent Cities of the Central New Jersey League, he joined the minor league team in Binghamton, New York, then was called up to the New York Giants at the end of the season. After a trip back to the minors because of an injury at the start of the 1893 season, he returned to the Giants later that year. Initially a third baseman, he later moved to the outfield. He quickly established himself as a star, and played until retiring in 1910.

Keeler's advice to hitters was "Keep your eye clear, and hit 'em where they ain't"—"they" being the opposing fielders. (Note: Although the saying, "Hit 'em where they ain't," has from its inception been credited to Keeler, on October 18, 1900 (predating by more than nine months the now-famous catchphrase's first appearance in print), the Wilkes-Barre Record published a less concisely worded but very similar piece of advice, ascribed to an unnamed Milwaukee Brewers fan by the team's then-third-baseman Lew Hartman. Lew Hartman, the third baseman with Wilkes-Barre in 1892, of late with Milwaukee since released by New York, tells funny stories about the German fans in Milwaukee. [...] There is a German fan in Milwaukee who continually calls out "Well! Well!" [...] One of his principal slogans is to call out: "Now shust hit der ball vere dey ain't!" And it's pretty good advice, at that.) His .385 career batting average after the 1898 season is the highest average in history at season's end for a player with more than 1,000 hits (1,147 hits). He compiled a .341 career batting average, tied for 11th with Bill Terry and Pete Browning as of 2022. He hit over .300 16 times in 19 seasons, and hit over .400 once. He twice led his league in batting average and three times in hits. Keeler had an amazing 206 singles during the 1898 season, a record that stood for more than 100 years until broken by Ichiro Suzuki. Additionally, Keeler had an on-base percentage of greater than .400 for seven straight seasons. When Keeler retired in 1910, he was third all-time in hits with 2,932, behind only Cap Anson and Jake Beckley.

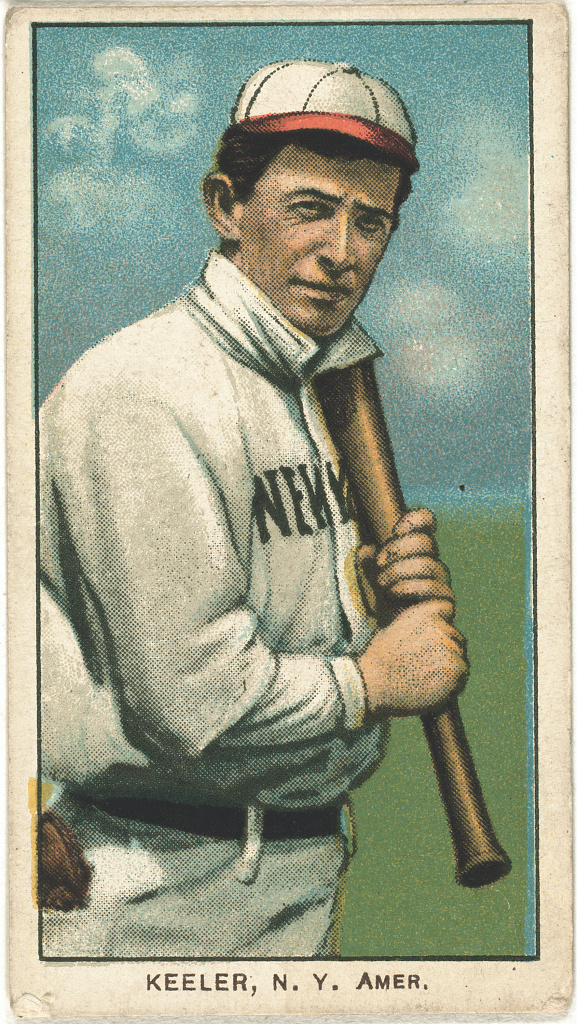
1909 baseball card of Keeler

Keeler had the ability to bunt most balls pitched to him, enabling him to avoid striking out; his skill at prolonging at bats by fouling pitches off with this method was the impetus for the rule change that made a foul bunt with two strikes a strikeout. In the 1899 season for the Brooklyn Superbas, in 570 at bats, Keeler struck out only twice, setting an AB-per-K mark of 285, a major league single-season record. With Ned Hanlon's Baltimore Orioles, he perfected the "Baltimore chop", in which he would chop the ball into the ground hard enough to cause a high bounce, which enabled him to reach first base before a fielder could glove the ball and throw him out. Bill James speculated that Keeler introduced the hit and run strategy to the original Orioles and teammate John McGraw. In James' theory, Boston's Tommy McCarthy was the first manager to make wide use of the hit and run. McCarthy then taught it to John Montgomery Ward, who taught it to Keeler.

In forming the powerful Baltimore Orioles of the late 19th century, manager Ned Hanlon was given an ownership stake in the team and a free rein to form his team. In one of the most one-sided trades in baseball history, Hanlon obtained Dan Brouthers and Keeler from Brooklyn in exchange for Billy Shindle and George Treadway. Keeler and six of his teammates from the Orioles were eventually inducted into the Hall of Fame.

In 1897, Keeler had a 44-game hitting streak to start the season, breaking the previous single season record of 42 set by Bill Dahlen. Keeler had a hit in his final game of the 1896 season, giving him a National League-record 45-game hitting streak. In 1941, this mark was bettered in the American League by Joe DiMaggio, who had a 56-game hitting streak. Keeler also had eight consecutive seasons with 200 hits or more, a record broken by Ichiro Suzuki in 2009.

In 1901, when Ban Johnson formed the American League, one of the first acts was to raid the National League and offer their stars big contracts. In 1901, Keeler received offers from six of the eight new American League clubs, including an offer from Chicago for two years at $4,300 a season ($166,410 in current dollar terms). Keeler remained in Brooklyn and did not play in the new league until 1903, when he signed with the New York Highlanders. In 1905, Keeler set the Highlanders team record for most sacrifice hits in a season with 42. Keeler was the Highlanders' captain during the 1908 and 1909 seasons.

Keeler remained with the Highlanders through 1909, and played the 1910 season with the New York Giants. Keeler played in 1911 for the Eastern League's Toronto Maple Leafs, and had 43 hits in 39 games.

== Later life ==
In 1901 and 1902, while still an active player, Keeler was the head coach of the Manhattan Jaspers baseball team. After his retirement, Keeler was a scout and coach for the Brooklyn Superbas and the Boston Braves, as well as Brooklyn's Federal League team, the Tip-Tops. He was wealthy after retiring as a player, and invested in mining companies, real estate, and other ventures. His real estate lost value in the post-World War I economic recession, and by the time of his death, his brothers and he had to sell their childhood home.

Keeler was a member of the Benevolent and Protective Order of Elks and Knights of Columbus.

Keeler suffered from tuberculosis and endocarditis for the last five years of his life. By late 1922, his condition had worsened and whether he would live into the new year was doubtful. Seriously ill by New Year's Eve, he heard bells and sirens in the streets when the new year arrived. Keeler sat up and said to his brother, "You see, the new year is here and so am I—still." He enjoyed a drink and a smoke, then said that he was ready for a long sleep. A short time later, Keeler died; he was 50. He is buried in Calvary Cemetery in Queens, New York.

== Legacy ==
Keeler was elected to the Baseball Hall of Fame in 1939. He appeared as number 75 on The Sporting News' list of the "100 Greatest Baseball Players". In 1999, he was named as a finalist to the Major League Baseball All-Century Team. Having played his last game in 1910, he was the most chronologically distant player on both Top 100 lists. Keeler was one of the smallest players to play the game, standing 5 feet 4½ inches and weighing 140 pounds (64 kg), resulting in his nickname of "Wee Willie".

Keeler is mentioned in the story "Hit 'em where they ain't" by Robert Ruark and as well in the poem "Line-Up for Yesterday" by Ogden Nash.

Line-Up for Yesterday

K is for Keeler,

As fresh as green paint,
The fastest and mostest
To hit where they ain't.

— Ogden Nash, Sport magazine (January 1949)

== See also ==
- List of Major League Baseball career hits leaders
- List of Major League Baseball career triples leaders
- List of Major League Baseball career runs scored leaders
- List of Major League Baseball career stolen bases leaders
- List of Major League Baseball batting champions
- List of Major League Baseball annual runs scored leaders
- List of Major League Baseball players with a .400 batting average in a season
- List of Major League Baseball single-game hits leaders
