= New York Metropolitans =

Baseball team (1880–1887)

Information
- League: American Association
- Location: New York City
- Ballpark: St. George Cricket Grounds (1886–1887)
- Founded: 1880
- Nickname: The Mets
- 1883–1887: 270–309 W–L
- American Association Pennant (1)
- Former ballparks: Polo Grounds (1885); Metropolitan Park (1884); Polo Grounds (1883)
- Colors: Teal, black, white
- Mascot: None
- Ownership: List of owners: Erastus Wiman (1886); John B. Day & Jim Mutrie (1880–1885)
- Manager: List of managers: O. P. Caylor (1887); Dave Orr (1887); Bob Ferguson (1886–1887); Jim Gifford (1885–1886); Jim Mutrie (1883–1884)

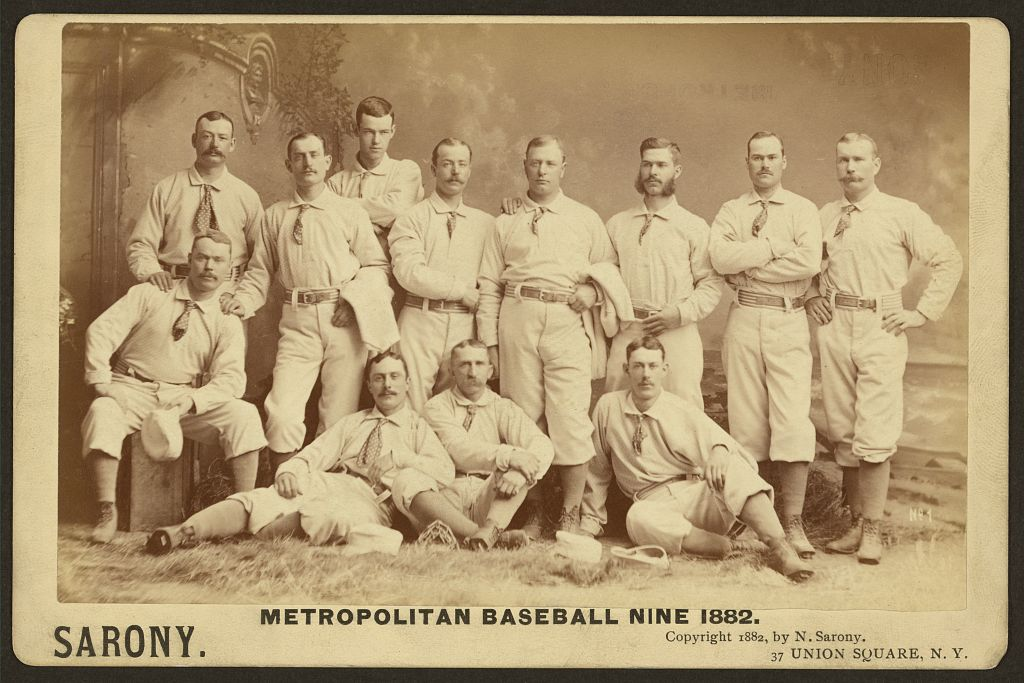
The 1882 New York Metropolitans

The Metropolitan Club (New York Metropolitans or the Mets) was a 19th-century professional baseball team that played in New York City from 1880 to 1887. (The New York Metropolitan Baseball Club was the name chosen in 1961 for the New York Mets, who began play in 1962.)

== History ==
=== Founding ===
A Manhattan-based yachting team known as Metropolitan Club was in existence and covered by The New York Times in the 1850s; it remains unclear whether the name had any connection to the baseball team.

The Metropolitan Club was founded in 1880 as an independent professional team by business entrepreneur John B. Day and baseball manager Jim Mutrie. Unusually for professional teams of the period, the Mets had an actual name and were listed in standings and box scores as "Metropol'n" as opposed to "New York." Initially the team played its games in Brooklyn and in Hoboken, New Jersey as the other New York area clubs did at the time. However, by September, Day had arranged the use of a polo field just north of Central Park in Manhattan, bounded by 5th & 6th Avenues and 110th & 112th Streets. The site became known as the Polo Grounds because polo was initially played there. The Polo Grounds was the first professional baseball park in Manhattan.

The club name, "Metropolitan", had previously been used by an amateur club that played its home games in the Hamilton Square neighborhood of New York as early as 1858.

=== Joining the American Association ===
The National League had expelled the Mutual Club of New York following the 1876 season for failing to make their final road trip of the year and by 1881 had still not replaced them with another New York City franchise. The upstart American Association therefore saw a significant opportunity when it invited the Metropolitan to join the new league for its 1882 inaugural season. Metropolitan declined, however, since joining would have meant forgoing lucrative home exhibition games against National League opponents.

Because of Metropolitan's financial success at the Polo Grounds, and because each league knew that it needed a successful New York City franchise to compete against the other, at the end of 1882 both leagues tendered franchise offers to the Mets. Unbeknownst to the leagues, though, the Mets accepted both invitations. To satisfy these commitments, owners Day and Mutrie acquired the Troy franchise that had been eliminated from the National League (along with Worcester) to make room for new franchises in New York City and Philadelphia. Day and Mutrie entered the Mets into the American Association and a newly created New York team into the National League. The teams shared use of the Polo Grounds, which was reconfigured with two diamonds and two grandstands.

The club's name "Metropolitan" was used in published standings of the Association, while the name "New York" was used for the National League entry. In the style of the day, the clubs were often called the "Metropolitans" and the "New Yorks". The "New Yorks" would eventually acquire the separate nicknames of the "Gothams" and then the "Giants". The Metropolitan club was referred to alternately as the "Metropolitan," "Metropolitans" or the "Mets". They were also referred to, on occasion, as the "Indians".

=== American Association successes ===
Initially, managed by Mutrie, the Metropolitans enjoyed greater success on the field than the Gothams. The Mets finished fourth in 1883, and won the 1884 American Association pennant. The Mets then faced Providence Grays of the National League in the 1884 World Series, but lost 3 games to none. Prominent Metropolitan players included Tim Keefe, Dave Orr, Chief Roseman, Jack Lynch, Candy Nelson and Dude Esterbrook.

A baseball oddity occurred for the Mets on April 30, 1885, when a man whose first name was not recorded played third base for them. With the Mets playing the Philadelphia Athletics at Polo Grounds I in Manhattan, a man listed only as "Jones" played as third baseman for the Metropolitans in his first game in the AA; an article in The New York Times stated that "A new man covered third base for the local team. He is an amateur, and gave his name as "Jones."" The Metropolitans lost to the Athletics 2–1. Jones's first name, date of birth, birthplace, and handedness were not recorded, and are still unknown.

=== Demise ===
Financially, though, the Gothams had more promise due to the National League's stability, quality of play, and higher ticket prices. As early as 1884, the Mets were struggling to establish their own identity, and opened the season in a new ballpark, Metropolitan Park, located on the east side of Manhattan. The move proved unsatisfactory, and by mid-season they had quietly moved back to their original Polo Grounds home.

Prior to the 1885 season, Mutrie shifted over to manage the Gothams and brought along star pitcher Keefe and third baseman Esterbrook. The rechristened New York Giants finished second in the National League in 1885, while the Mets slumped to seventh place in the AA.

Prior to the 1886 season, Day and Mutrie sold the Mets to developer Erastus Wiman who moved the team to the St. George Cricket Grounds on Staten Island. Wiman, who also owned a ferry line, hoped to promote ferry trade across New York Harbor and further development of Staten Island. This business plan did not succeed, though, and the Mets ceased operation following the 1887 season. The team was bought by the Brooklyn Dodgers for $15,000 to gain territorial protection and the contracts of several of the Mets' stars, including Dave Orr and Darby O'Brien. The former minor league Staten Island Yankees played from 2001–2019 in a stadium very near the cricket ground used by the Mets.

== Present-day Mets ==
In 1962, when the National League added a franchise in New York to replace the departed Giants and Dodgers, the owners and the fans of New York selected "Mets" as the nickname for the new club, in part to suggest continuity with the Metropolitans; its original formal name was the "New York Metropolitan Baseball Club." These 20th-century New York Mets played their first two seasons at the final version of the Polo Grounds before it was ultimately torn down in 1964, when the Mets moved to Shea Stadium. They currently play in Citi Field, which was built next to the now-demolished Shea Stadium and opened in 2009.

== Notable alumni ==
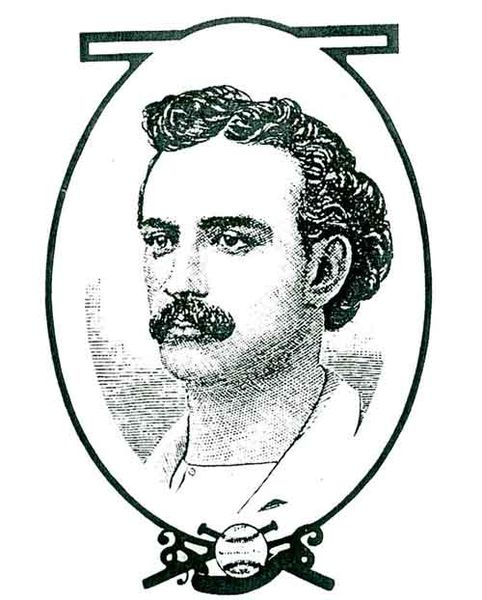
Lip Pike

- Lip Pike, four-time major league home run champion

== See also ==
- New York Metropolitans all-time roster
- 1883 New York Metropolitans season
- 1884 New York Metropolitans season
- 1885 New York Metropolitans season
- 1886 New York Metropolitans season
- 1887 New York Metropolitans season
