= Brooklyn Gladiators =

Information
- League: American Association (1890)
- Location: Ridgewood, Queens County, New York
- Ballpark: Ridgewood Park (1890)
- Founded: 1890
- Folded: August 27, 1890
- Manager: Jim Kennedy

The Brooklyn Gladiators were a Major League Baseball team in the American Association during the 1890 season. They were last in the league with a 26–73 record when the franchise folded on August 27, 1890.

== History ==
The Gladiators were managed by Jim Kennedy and played their home games at Ridgewood Park. Their top-hitting regular was first baseman Billy O'Brien, who had a .278 batting average, a .415 slugging percentage, and led the club by far in RBIs with 67. Their best pitcher was Ed Daily (10-15, 4.05), who was also their starting right fielder when he was not pitching.

The Gladiators lasted for one season only, a year when Brooklyn boasted three professional ballclubs: Also competing for local fans' interest were the National League's first-place Bridegrooms, who had been Brooklyn's American Association club from 1884 to 1889, and the Brooklyn Ward's Wonders of the Players' League, managed by future Hall of Famer John Montgomery Ward. By August, there were rumors that club management, frustrated by a lack of public interest, would move the struggling team to Washington, D.C. That midseason move never came to pass, and while 1891 did see the addition of the Washington Statesmen to the American Association's final season, neither Kennedy nor any Gladiator players were on the squad.

The Gladiators were immediately replaced in the American Association by the Baltimore Orioles (Atlantic Association) when Brooklyn folded from the league on August 27, 1890. Baltimore left the Atlantic Association and played the remainder of the American Association season with a 15–19 record.

Of the 23 men who played for the Gladiators, only three—Daily, second baseman Joe Gerhardt, and third baseman Jumbo Davis—played professionally beyond the 1890 season. None played past July 1891.

== See also ==
- 1890 Brooklyn Gladiators season
