= 1890 Syracuse Stars season =

1890 Syracuse Stars
- League: American Association
- Ballpark: Star Park
- City: Syracuse, New York
- Record: 55–72 (.433)
- League place: 7th
- Owner: George Frazier
- Managers: George Frazier, Wallace Fessenden

The 1890 Syracuse Stars baseball team finished with a 55–72 record, seventh place in the American Association during their only season in Major League baseball. They had previously played in the International Association in 1888 and 1889.

== Regular season ==
=== Season standings ===
American Association
Team	W	L	Pct.	GB	Home	Road
Louisville Colonels	88	44	.667	—	57‍–‍13	31‍–‍31
Columbus Solons	79	55	.590	10	47‍–‍22	32‍–‍33
St. Louis Browns	78	58	.574	12	45‍–‍25	33‍–‍33
Toledo Maumees	68	64	.515	20	40‍–‍27	28‍–‍37
Rochester Broncos	63	63	.500	22	40‍–‍22	23‍–‍41
Baltimore Orioles	15	19	.441	24	8‍–‍11	7‍–‍8
Syracuse Stars	55	72	.433	30½	30‍–‍30	25‍–‍42
Philadelphia Athletics	54	78	.409	34	36‍–‍36	18‍–‍42
Brooklyn Gladiators	26	73	.263	45½	15‍–‍22	11‍–‍51

=== Record vs. opponents ===
1890 American Association record Sources:
Team	BAL	BR	COL	LOU	PHI	ROC	STL	SYR	TOL
Baltimore	—	0–0	2–4–2	1–2–1	2–2	5–1	2–5	1–2	2–3–1
Brooklyn	0–0	—	5–9	2–13	2–10	3–10–1	4–10	5–12	5–9
Columbus	4–2–2	9–5	—	10–8–1	11–9	10–9–1	12–8–2	10–7	13–7
Louisville	2–1–1	13–2	8–10–1	—	17–3	11–6–2	9–11	14–5	14–6
Philadelphia	2–2	10–2	9–11	3–17	—	7–12	7–13	10–7	6–14
Rochester	1–5	10–3–1	9–10–1	6–11–2	12–7	—	8–12–1	11–4–1	6–11–1
St. Louis	5–2	10–4	8–12–2	11–9	13–7	12–8–1	—	10–9	9–7
Syracuse	2–1	12–5	7–10	5–14	7–10	4–11–1	9–10	—	9–11
Toledo	3–2–1	9–5	7–13	6–14	14–6	11–6–1	7–9	11–9	—

=== Notable transactions ===
- August 16, 1890: Rasty Wright was released by the Stars.

=== Roster ===
1890 Syracuse Stars
Roster
Pitchers: Dan Casey; John Keefe; Frank Keffer; Ezra Lincoln; Toby Lyons; Ed Mars; Charlie McCullough; Mike Morrison; Bill Sullivan	Catchers: Grant Briggs; Dan Burke; Pat Dealy; Louis Graff; Tom O'Rourke; Herman Pitz; Infielders: Joe Battin; Cupid Childs; Bill Higgins; Barney McLaughlin; Mox McQuery; Tim O'Rourke	Outfielders: Mike Dorgan; Bones Ely; Pat Friel; Ducky Hemp; John Leighton; John Peltz; George Proeser; Hank Simon; Rasty Wright	Manager: George Frazier; Wallace Fessenden

== Player stats ==
=== Batting ===
==== Starters by position ====
Note: Pos = Position; G = Games played; AB = At bats; H = Hits; Avg. = Batting average; HR = Home runs; RBI = Runs batted in

Pos	Player	G	AB	H	Avg.	HR	RBI
C	Grant Briggs	86	316	57	.180	0	21
1B	Mox McQuery	122	461	142	.308	2	55
2B	Cupid Childs	126	493	170	.345	2	89
3B	Tim O'Rourke	87	332	94	.283	1	46
SS	Barney McLaughlin	86	329	87	.264	2	40
OF	Rasty Wright	88	348	106	.305	0	27
OF	Bones Ely	119	496	130	.262	0	64
OF	Pat Friel	62	261	65	.249	3	21

==== Other batters ====
Note: G = Games played; AB = At bats; H = Hits; Avg. = Batting average; HR = Home runs; RBI = Runs batted in

Player	G	AB	H	Avg.	HR	RBI
Hank Simon	38	156	47	.301	2	23
Tom O'Rourke	41	153	33	.216	0	12
Mike Dorgan	33	139	30	.216	0	18
Joe Battin	29	119	25	.210	0	13
Herman Pitz	29	95	21	.221	0	3
Pat Dealy	18	66	12	.182	0	4
George Proeser	13	53	13	.245	1	6
Ducky Hemp	9	33	5	.152	0	1
John Leighton	7	27	8	.296	0	0
Dan Burke	9	20	0	.000	0	0
John Peltz	5	17	3	.176	0	2
Louis Graff	1	5	2	.400	0	3
Bill Higgins	1	4	1	.250	0	1

=== Pitching ===
==== Starting pitchers ====
Note: G = Games pitched; IP = Innings pitched; W = Wins; L = Losses; ERA = Earned run average; SO = Strikeouts

Player	G	IP	W	L	ERA	SO
Dan Casey	45	360.2	19	22	4.14	169
John Keefe	43	352.1	17	24	4.32	120
Mike Morrison	17	127.0	6	9	5.88	69
Ed Mars	16	121.1	9	5	4.67	59
Bill Sullivan	6	42.0	1	4	7.93	13
Charlie McCullough	3	26.0	1	2	7.27	8
Toby Lyons	3	22.1	0	2	10.48	6
Ezra Lincoln	3	20.0	0	3	10.35	6

==== Other pitchers ====
Note: G = Games pitched; IP = Innings pitched; W = Wins; L = Losses; ERA = Earned run average; SO = Strikeouts

Player	G	IP	W	L	ERA	SO
Frank Keffer	2	16.0	1	1	5.63	4

==== Relief pitchers ====
Note: G = Games pitched; W = Wins; L = Losses; SV = Saves; ERA = Earned run average; SO = Strikeouts

Player	G	W	L	SV	ERA	SO
Bones Ely	1	0	0	0	22.50	0
