= 1890 Toledo Maumees season =

1890 Toledo Maumees
- League: American Association
- Ballpark: Speranza Park
- City: Toledo, Ohio
- Record: 68–64 (.515)
- League place: 4th
- Manager: Charlie Morton

The 1890 Toledo Maumees baseball team finished with a 68–64 record, good for fourth place in the American Association during their only season in existence.

== Regular season ==
=== Season standings ===
American Association
Team	W	L	Pct.	GB	Home	Road
Louisville Colonels	88	44	.667	—	57‍–‍13	31‍–‍31
Columbus Solons	79	55	.590	10	47‍–‍22	32‍–‍33
St. Louis Browns	78	58	.574	12	45‍–‍25	33‍–‍33
Toledo Maumees	68	64	.515	20	40‍–‍27	28‍–‍37
Rochester Broncos	63	63	.500	22	40‍–‍22	23‍–‍41
Baltimore Orioles	15	19	.441	24	8‍–‍11	7‍–‍8
Syracuse Stars	55	72	.433	30½	30‍–‍30	25‍–‍42
Philadelphia Athletics	54	78	.409	34	36‍–‍36	18‍–‍42
Brooklyn Gladiators	26	73	.263	45½	15‍–‍22	11‍–‍51

=== Record vs. opponents ===
1890 American Association record Sources:
Team	BAL	BKG	COL	LOU	PHA	RCH	STL	SYR	TOL
Baltimore	—	0–0	2–4–2	1–2–1	2–2	5–1	2–5	1–2	2–3–1
Brooklyn	0–0	—	5–9	2–13	2–10	3–10–1	4–10	5–12	5–9
Columbus	4–2–2	9–5	—	10–8–1	11–9	10–9–1	12–8–2	10–7	13–7
Louisville	2–1–1	13–2	8–10–1	—	17–3	11–6–2	9–11	14–5	14–6
Philadelphia	2–2	10–2	9–11	3–17	—	7–12	7–13	10–7	6–14
Rochester	1–5	10–3–1	9–10–1	6–11–2	12–7	—	8–12–1	11–4–1	6–11–1
St. Louis	5–2	10–4	8–12–2	11–9	13–7	12–8–1	—	10–9	9–7
Syracuse	2–1	12–5	7–10	5–14	7–10	4–11–1	9–10	—	9–11
Toledo	3–2–1	9–5	7–13	6–14	14–6	11–6–1	7–9	11–9	—

=== Roster ===
1890 Toledo Maumees
Roster
Pitchers: Dan Abbott; Ed Cushman; Babe Doty; Egyptian Healy; Ed O'Neil; Fred Smith	Catchers: Floyd Ritter; Emmett Rogers; Harry Sage; Tub Welch; Infielders: Billy Alvord; Parson Nicholson; Frank Scheibeck; Perry Werden	Outfielders: John Peltz; John Sneed; Charlie Sprague; Ed Swartwood; George Tebeau; Bill Van Dyke	Manager: Charlie Morton

== Player stats ==
=== Batting ===
==== Starters by position ====
Note: Pos = Position; G = Games played; AB = At bats; H = Hits; Avg. = Batting average; HR = Home runs; RBI = Runs batted in

Pos	Player	G	AB	H	Avg.	HR	RBI
C	Harry Sage	81	275	41	.149	2	25
1B	Perry Werden	128	498	147	.295	6	72
2B	Parson Nicholson	134	523	140	.268	4	72
SS	Frank Scheibeck	134	485	117	.241	1	49
3B	Billy Alvord	116	495	135	.273	2	52
OF	Bill Van Dyke	129	502	129	.257	2	54
OF	Ed Swartwood	126	462	151	.327	3	64
OF	George Tebeau	94	389	102	.268	1	36

==== Other batters ====
Note: G = Games played; AB = At bats; H = Hits; Avg. = Batting average; HR = Home runs; RBI = Runs batted in

Player	G	AB	H	Avg.	HR	RBI
Charlie Sprague	55	199	47	.236	1	19
Emmett Rogers	35	110	19	.173	0	7
Tub Welch	35	108	31	.287	1	14
John Peltz	20	73	18	.247	0	13
John Sneed	9	30	6	.200	0	4
Floyd Ritter	1	3	0	.000	0	0

=== Pitching ===
==== Starting pitchers ====
Note: G = Games pitched; IP = Innings pitched; W = Wins; L = Losses; ERA = Earned run average; SO = Strikeouts

Player	G	IP	W	L	ERA	SO
Egyptian Healy	46	389.0	22	21	2.89	225
Ed Cushman	40	315.2	17	21	4.19	125
Babe Doty	1	9.0	1	0	1.00	4

==== Other pitchers ====
Note: G = Games pitched; IP = Innings pitched; W = Wins; L = Losses; ERA = Earned run average; SO = Strikeouts

Player	G	IP	W	L	ERA	SO
Dan Abbott	3	13.0	0	2	6.23	1

==== Relief pitchers ====
Note: G = Games pitched; W = Wins; L = Losses; SV = Saves; ERA = Earned run average; SO = Strikeouts

Player	G	W	L	SV	ERA	SO
George Tebeau	1	0	0	0	9.00	0
Ed Swartwood	1	0	0	0	3.00	1
