= 1890 Baltimore Orioles season =

1890 Baltimore Orioles
- League: American Association
- Ballpark: Oriole Park
- City: Baltimore, Maryland
- Record: 15–19 (.441)
- League place: 6th
- Owner: Harry Von der Horst
- Manager: Billy Barnie

The Baltimore Orioles team left the American Association after the 1889 season and started playing in the minor Atlantic Association. However, when the Brooklyn Gladiators ballclub folded mid-way through the 1890 season, the Orioles returned to the AA to finish out the season.

== Regular season ==
=== Season standings ===
American Association
Team	W	L	Pct.	GB	Home	Road
Louisville Colonels	88	44	.667	—	57‍–‍13	31‍–‍31
Columbus Solons	79	55	.590	10	47‍–‍22	32‍–‍33
St. Louis Browns	78	58	.574	12	45‍–‍25	33‍–‍33
Toledo Maumees	68	64	.515	20	40‍–‍27	28‍–‍37
Rochester Broncos	63	63	.500	22	40‍–‍22	23‍–‍41
Baltimore Orioles	15	19	.441	24	8‍–‍11	7‍–‍8
Syracuse Stars	55	72	.433	30½	30‍–‍30	25‍–‍42
Philadelphia Athletics	54	78	.409	34	36‍–‍36	18‍–‍42
Brooklyn Gladiators	26	73	.263	45½	15‍–‍22	11‍–‍51

=== Record vs. opponents ===
1890 American Association record Sources:
Team	BAL	BKG	COL	LOU	PHA	RCH	STL	SYR	TOL
Baltimore	—	0–0	2–4–2	1–2–1	2–2	5–1	2–5	1–2	2–3–1
Brooklyn	0–0	—	5–9	2–13	2–10	3–10–1	4–10	5–12	5–9
Columbus	4–2–2	9–5	—	10–8–1	11–9	10–9–1	12–8–2	10–7	13–7
Louisville	2–1–1	13–2	8–10–1	—	17–3	11–6–2	9–11	14–5	14–6
Philadelphia	2–2	10–2	9–11	3–17	—	7–12	7–13	10–7	6–14
Rochester	1–5	10–3–1	9–10–1	6–11–2	12–7	—	8–12–1	11–4–1	6–11–1
St. Louis	5–2	10–4	8–12–2	11–9	13–7	12–8–1	—	10–9	9–7
Syracuse	2–1	12–5	7–10	5–14	7–10	4–11–1	9–10	—	9–11
Toledo	3–2–1	9–5	7–13	6–14	14–6	11–6–1	7–9	11–9	—

=== Roster ===
1890 Baltimore Orioles
Roster
Pitchers: Norm Baker; Les German; Sadie McMahon; Mike Morrison; Mike O'Rourke	Catchers: Wilbert Robinson; Pop Tate; George Townsend; Infielders: Pete Gilbert; Belden Hill; Reddy Mack; Tom Power; Irv Ray	Outfielders: Lefty Johnson; Dan Long; Joe McGuckin; Joe Sommer; Curt Welch	Manager: Billy Barnie

== Player stats ==
=== Batting ===
==== Starters by position ====
Note: Pos = Position; G = Games played; AB = At bats; H = Hits; Avg. = Batting average; HR = Home runs; RBI = Runs batted in

Pos	Player	G	AB	H	Avg.	HR	RBI
C	George Townsend	18	67	16	.239	0	9
1B	Tom Power	38	125	26	.208	0	6
2B	Reddy Mack	26	95	27	.284	0	11
3B	Pete Gilbert	29	100	28	.280	1	18
SS	Irv Ray	38	139	50	.360	1	20
OF	Joe Sommer	38	129	33	.256	0	23
OF	Dan Long	21	77	12	.156	0	2
OF	Lefty Johnson	24	95	28	.295	0	6

==== Other batters ====
Note: G = Games played; AB = At bats; H = Hits; Avg. = Batting average; HR = Home runs; RBI = Runs batted in

Player	G	AB	H	Avg.	HR	RBI
Pop Tate	19	71	13	.183	0	6
Curt Welch	19	68	9	.132	0	5
Wilbert Robinson	14	48	13	.271	0	4
Joe McGuckin	11	37	4	.108	0	2
Belden Hill	9	30	5	.167	0	2

=== Pitching ===
==== Starting pitchers ====
Note: G = Games pitched; IP = Innings pitched; W = Wins; L = Losses; ERA = Earned run average; SO = Strikeouts

Player	G	IP	W	L	ERA	SO
Les German	17	132.1	5	11	4.83	37
Sadie McMahon	12	99.0	7	3	3.00	66
Mike O'Rourke	5	41.0	1	2	3.95	8
Mike Morrison	4	26.0	1	2	3.81	13
Norm Baker	2	17.0	1	1	3.71	10

== See also ==
- Baltimore Orioles (Atlantic Association)
