= Camden (baseball) =

- 1889; Camden, Delaware

Minor league affiliations
- Class: Independent (1889)
- League: Delaware State League (1889)

Major league affiliations
- Team: None

Minor league titles
- League titles (0): None

Team data
- Name: Camden (1889)
- Ballpark: Unknown (1889)

The Camden team was a minor league baseball team based in Camden, Delaware. In 1889, the Camden team was a member of the Independent level Delaware State League, finishing in fourth place in a shortened season. The Camden team played without a known nickname, as was common in the era.

== History ==
The Camden team was a charter member when the 1889 Delaware State League began minor league play as an Independent five–team league. The Delaware State League was formed with the Delaware teams of Dover, Milford, Smyrna and Wilmington Peach Growers teams joining Camden as charter members.

Evolving from local semi–professional baseball, the Delaware State League structure allowed each team to pay eight players and the league had no residency requirements. The league began play with controversy over Dover’s signing of Bill Higgins, who had played in 14 major league games for the Boston Beaneaters the previous season. Smyrna claimed they had also signed Higgins. Dover threatened to fold their franchise over the dispute and review of the situation was resolved in favor of Dover.

The Delaware State League began play on July 8, 1889, as a crowd of 600 was on hand to see Dover defeat Wilmington in the league opener. Camden began play under manager J.R. Richardson.

After beginning play two weeks earlier, the Delaware State League permanently folded on July 25, 1889. The league's demise began when the Smyrna franchise reportedly couldn’t compete with other teams in player salaries and folded, with the team in last place. Within two weeks of Smyrna folding, the entire league folded. Camden had a 3–6 record when the league permanently folded. The league records and standings on the folding date of July 25, 1889, were: Dover (8–2), Milford (6–5), Wilmington (5–4) Camden (3–6) and Smyrna (1–6). Camden finished 4.5 games behind first place Dover in the final league standings.

Camden, Delaware has not hosted another minor league team.

== The ballpark ==
The name of the 1889 Camden minor league home ballpark is unknown.

== Year–by–year record ==
Year	Record	Finish	Manager	Playoffs/
1889	3–6	4th	J.R. Richardson	League folded July 29

== Notable alumni ==
- Charlie Hilsey (1889)
- Camden (minor league baseball) players
