= John Wesley Yale =

Colonel from New York

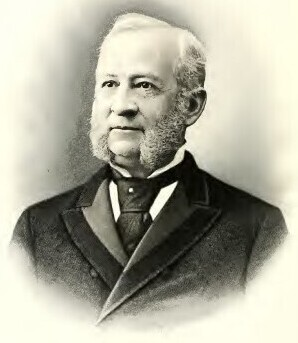
Portrait of Colonel John Wesley Yale of the 51st regiment of New York

Colonel John Wesley Yale (1832 – 1900), of Syracuse, New York, was a paper merchant, military officer and manager and trustee of the New York State Asylum by Gov. Theodore Roosevelt. He served the Democrats under various state and national conventions.

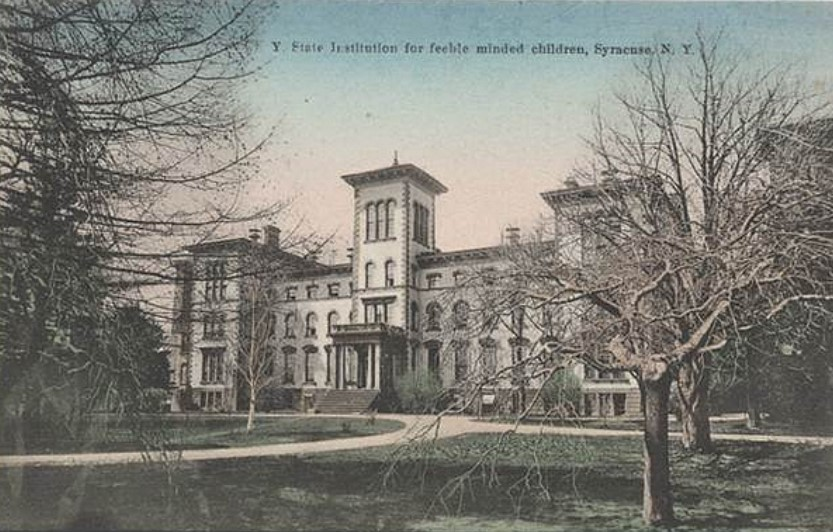
The New York State Asylum, now known as Syracuse State School

== Early life ==
John Wesley Yale was born December 17, 1832, in Scipio, New York, to Aaron Yale and Mary Saunders, members of the Yale family. His father was a large carriage manufacturer in Pennsylvania and one of the California pioneers of 1849 during the California gold rush. His grandfather and great-grandfather both fought as soldiers during the American War of Independence under Col. Charles Webb's regiment. They were the descendants of Capt. Theophilus Yale of Connecticut.

His nephew was Charles Chapin, the New York editor of The Evening World, the paper of Congressman Joseph Pulitzer, and a distant cousin, James Yale, was a cigar manufacturer in New York. His sister, Cecilia A. Yale, married to Earl Chapin, a nephew of one of the richest man in America, Russell Sage.

== Career ==
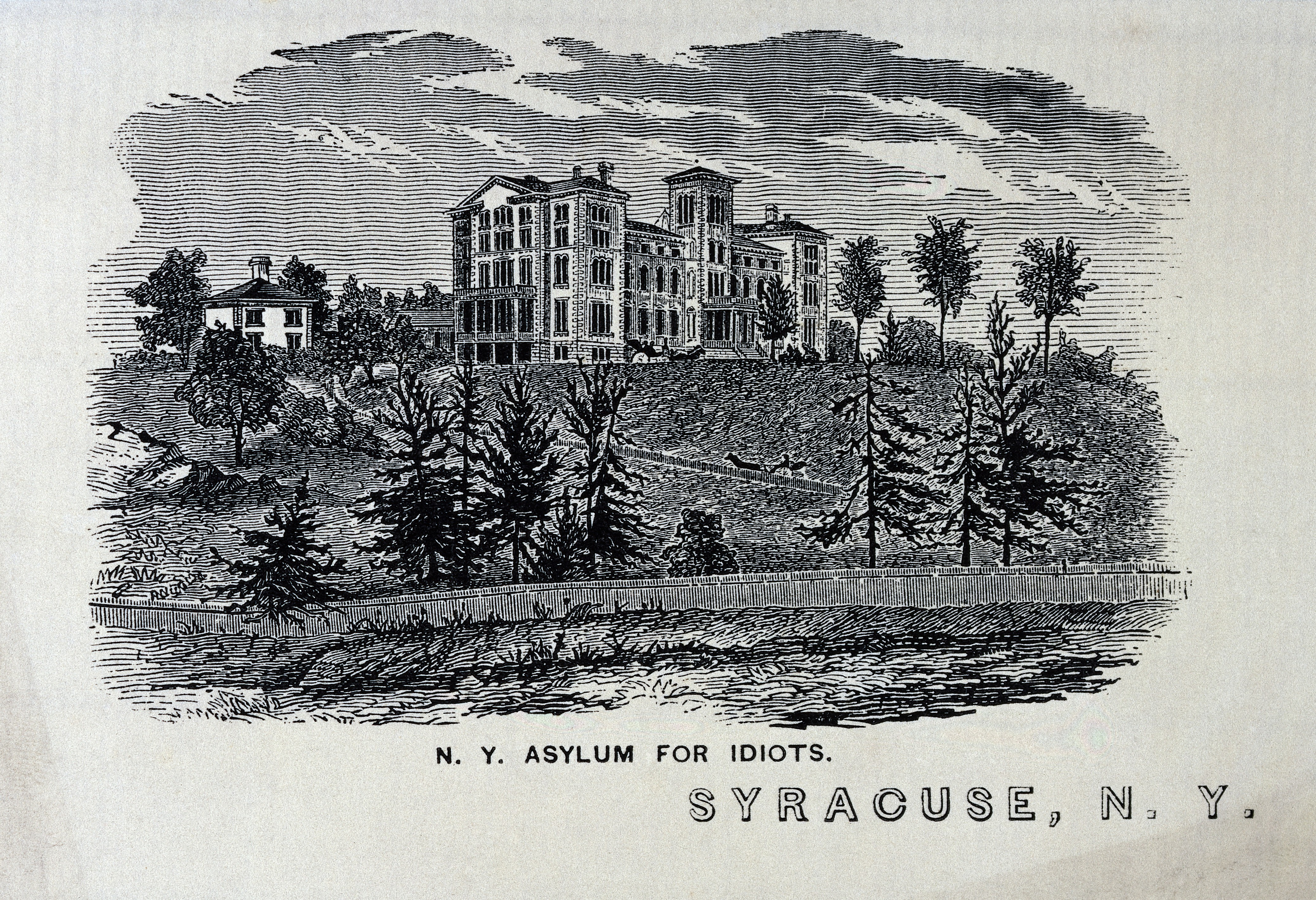
The New York State Asylum of Syracuse, New York, Yale was one of its board directors and managers

Yale moved to Perryville, New York during his childhood and attended district schools. Later, he started a book business in New York, and around 1860, started another book and wall-paper business in Syracuse. For over 30 years, he conducted his enterprise, along with an art gallery, and his business grew large throughout central New York. His son became a partner under J. W. Yale & Son.. From his newly acquired wealth, he invested in real estate and became the owner of a large amount of property.

In 1861, he joined the Citizen Corps, and afterward, joined the National Guard. In July 1866, he was appointed Quartermaster, and on February 8, 1877, was appointed Colonel of the 51st regiment of New York. The 41st Infantry Regiment was nicknamed the "Yale Rifles" in honor of Colonel Yale. He became also an officer of St James' Church.

In 1880, he was candidate for the office of Mayor of Syracuse, but lost to Francis Hendricks. He resigned in 1881 from the 51st regiment and was replaced by Colonel Dwight H. Bruce. Throughout his career, he was prominent in democratic circles, being elected chairman of the Onondaga County committee of New York for the Democrats. For several terms, he was appointed a member of the board of education, and in 1887, was appointed on the board of police commissioners by Mayor Willis B. Burns.

Later on, he was made president of the board, and in 1892, was appointed manager of New York State Asylum by N.Y. Gov. Roswell P. Flower. He was re-appointed again in 1896 by Gov. Levi P. Morton, later Vice-President, and in 1900, was re-elected on the board of trustee of New York State Asylum by the Governor of New York, Theodore Roosevelt, later U.S. president. Other trustees included Senator George B. Sloan, Bishop of New York Frederic Dan Huntington, Chief Judge George F. Comstock, banker Abiah W. Palmer, and others. He was also on the Building Committee and Executive Committee of the institution.

He represented the Democrats at various state and national conventions, and became a personal friend of New York governors David B. Hill, U.S. Senator, and Roswell P. Flower, U.S. Congressman. For 13 years, Yale had the contract to provide meals to the National Guard at the State camp in Peekskill, New York, with Louis Windholz as a partner in the venture. He also became a freemason, member of the Central City Lodge and the Masonic Veterans, reaching the degrees of Knights Templar and 32nd of the Scottish Rite.

== Death ==
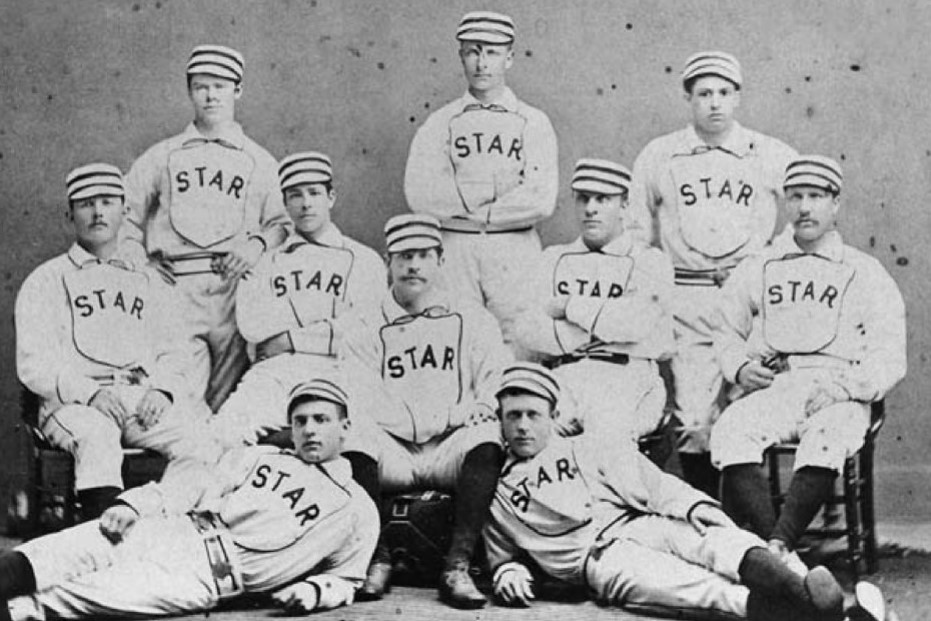
Syracuse Stars, baseball team of Col. Yale's son-in-law, George Frazier

Yale died in Syracuse, New York on June 26, 1900.

He was a member of the Citizen's Club, Swan Lake Hunting Club, Beaver River Club in the Adirondacks and St. Paul's Episcopal church.

Colonel Yale married July 22, 1856 to Frances Olive Means of New York, daughter of Colonel John Means, a hotel proprietor and veteran of the War of 1812.

They had one daughter and two sons.

- Mary Yale, born April 22, 1861, married to George Frazier, owner and manager of Syracuse's National League Club, the Syracuse Stars, and secondly, to John Henry Walrath, Mayor of Syracuse.
- Wesley Aaron Yale, born March 20, 1870, was Lieutenant and father of Colonel Wesley Woodworth Yale, who fought under General Patton's Third Army regiment. who was in turn, the father of Lieutenant Colonel John W. Yale Jr. of the US Air Force.
