= Delaware State League =

- Classification: Independent (1889)
- Sport: Minor League Baseball
- First season: July 8, 1889
- Folded: July 25, 1889
- President: Unknown (1889)
- No. of teams: 5
- Country: United States of America
- Most titles: 1 Dover (1889)
- Related competitions: Middle States League (1889)

The Delaware State League was a minor league baseball league that played briefly in the 1889 season. The five–team Independent level Delaware State League consisted exclusively of teams based in Delaware. The Delaware State League played only the 1889 season, with Dover winning the league championship.

== History ==
The Delaware State League began minor league play as an Independent five–team league in 1889. The Delaware State League was formed with teams in the Delaware cities of Camden, Dover, Milford, Smyrna and Wilmington as the charter members.

Evolving from local semi–professional baseball, the Delaware State League structure was that each team was allowed to pay eight players and the league had no residency requirements. There was controversy over Dover's signing of Bill Higgins, who had played in 14 major league games for the Boston Beaneaters the previous season. Smyrna management claimed they had also signed Higgins. Dover threatened to fold their franchise over the dispute, before a review of the situation was resolved in favor of Dover.

The Delaware State League began play on July 8, 1889. A crowd of 600 was on hand to see Dover defeat Wilmington in the league opener. Dover started the season with a 5–2 record, just ahead of Wilmington at 4–2, with both losses to Dover. Dover then defeated Wilmington at Wilmington, as the league was beginning to have attendance issues.

After beginning play weeks earlier, the Delaware State League permanently folded on July 25, 1889, before the completion of the 1889 season schedule. Smyrna reportedly couldn't compete with other teams in player salaries and folded. Within two weeks the entire league folded. The team records and standings on the folding date of July 25, 1889 were: Dover (8–2), Milford (6–5), Wilmington (5–4) Camden (3–6) and Smyrna (1–6).

After the Delaware State League folded, the Wilmington Peach Growers became members of the 1889 Middle States League, another league in the region, that played in only the 1889 season. The Wilmington Peach Growers folded on September 13, 1889, with a 4–9 record. Some sources have the Wilmington team playing as the "Quicksteps."

== Delaware State League teams ==
Team name(s)	City represented	Ballpark	Year
Camden	Camden, Delaware	Unknown	1889
Dover	Dover, Delaware	Unknown	1889
Milford	Milford, Delaware	Unknown	1889
Smyrna	Smyrna, Delaware	Unknown	1889
Wilmington Peach Growers	Wilmington, Delaware	Unknown	1889

== 1889 Delaware State League standings ==
Team standings	W	L	PCT	GB	Managers
Dover	8	2	.800	–	Harry Richardson
Milford	6	5	.545	2½	Charles Fisher
Wilmington	5	4	.556	2½	Samuel Ochiltree
Camden	3	6	.333	4½	J.R. Richardson
Smyrna	1	6	.143	6½	O.B. Voshell
