= Charles Chapin =

American newspaper editor and murderer (1858–1930)

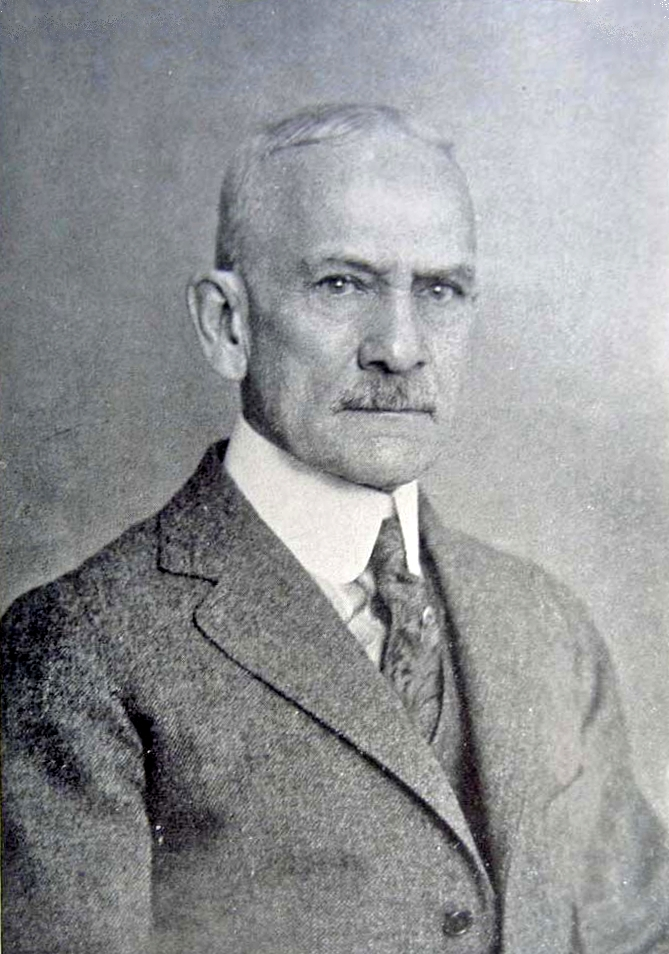
Chapin in 1920

Charles E. Chapin (October 19, 1858 – December 13, 1930) was an American editor of Joseph Pulitzer’s Evening World. He was convicted of the murder of his wife and sentenced to a 20-year-to-life term in Sing Sing prison.

== Career ==
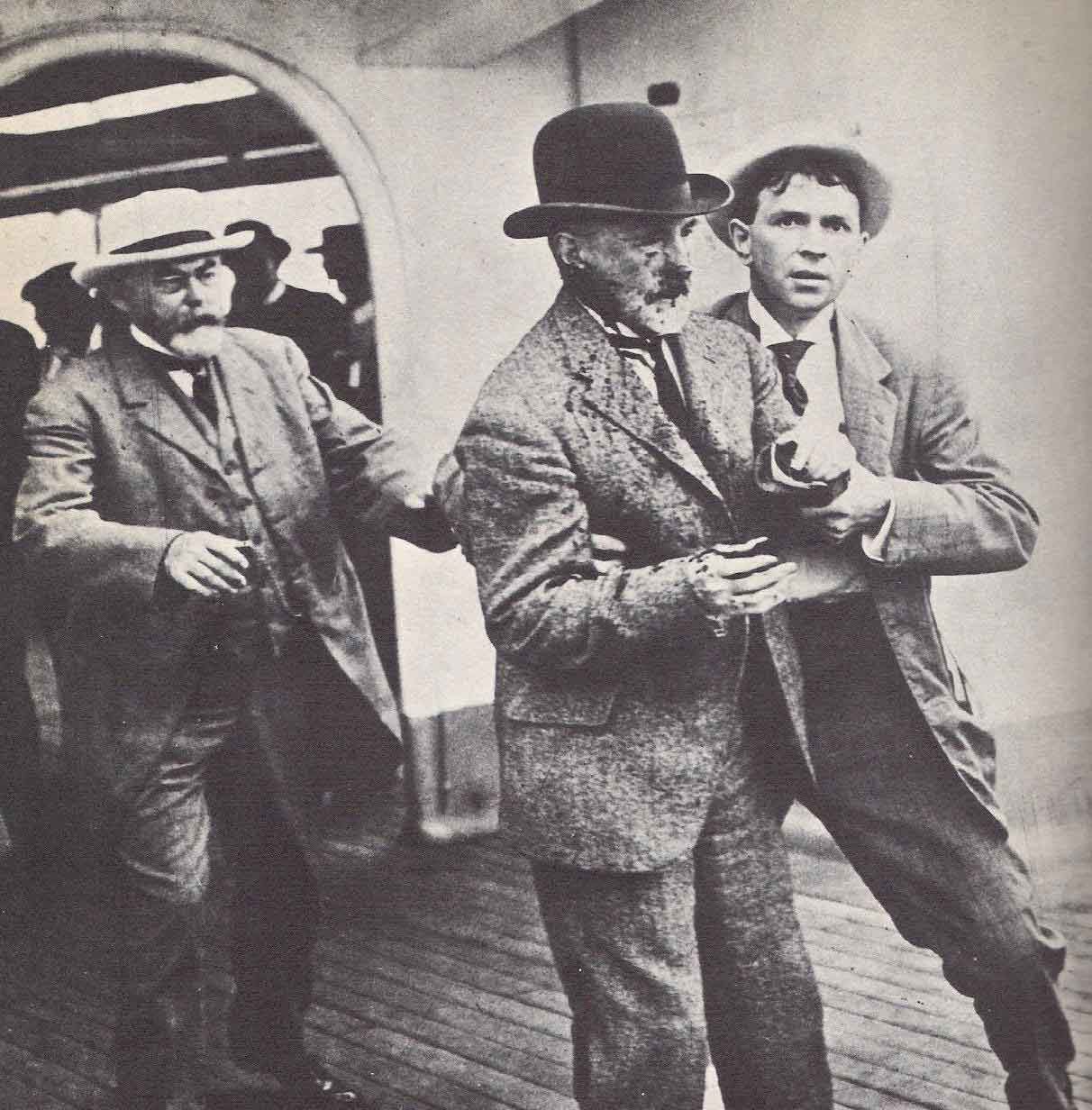
An example of breaking news photography published by Chapin—New York mayor W. J. Gaynor after being shot, August 9, 1910

Chapin was born in upstate Watertown, New York to Earl Chapin and Cecelia A. Yale, member of the Yale family. His brother was Frederick Yale Chapin and his grandfather, Aaron Yale, was a California pioneer and the owner of a large carriage manufacturing business in Pennsylvania. His uncle was Col. John Wesley Yale of the N.Y. Infantry, son-in-law of Col. John Means of the War of 1812, and was in the book, wall-paper, and art business in New York. Col. Yale was also Chairman for the Democrats in his county, a friend of Gov. David B. Hill and Roswell P. Flower, vestryman of St Paul's Episcopal Church, and was nominated trustee of N.Y. State Asylum by Gov. Teddy Roosevelt.

Chapin began his career on a Kansas newspaper, aged 14, moving later to Chicago to work for the Chicago Tribune, where he gained renown as a crime reporter. He excelled sufficiently to be hired in 1898 by the Evening World, a New York daily, run by the Pulitzer family.

Unlike the morning World, which Pulitzer saw as a reflection of his voice and serious-minded sensibilities, the Evening World was "a commercial enterprise" with an emphasis on crime and entertainment. It enjoyed one of the largest circulations in the country, thanks in part to Chapin's news instincts and use of large, "startling" headlines.

Chapin was known as a hard taskmaster. He is said to have fired a total of 108 journalists during his tenure – one of them for daring to use the new-fangled word "questionnaire". Among his victims was his own publisher's son, Joseph Pulitzer Jr., after the younger Pulitzer repeatedly missed work. The elder Pulitzer backed Chapin's decision, and later sent his son to the St. Louis Post-Dispatch, where Joseph Pulitzer Jr. helped turn it into "one of the nation's best, most influential and profitable newspapers."

According to Chapin's editorial philosophy, "Gathering the news of a great city is a carefully thought-out and systematized piece of human machinery that operates under the personal supervision of the city editor."

He considered himself a newspaper man, not a journalist, and stated, "Journalism! How I grew to detest that much abused word. Every brainless mutt I ever met in a newspaper office described himself as a "journalist.” The real men, the men who knew news, knew how to get it and knew how to write it, preferred to be known as newspaper men. One never hears a star reporter along Park Row speak of journalism."

Chapin relentlessly insisted on finding breaking news and once after J. P. Morgan's security detail battered one of his reporters, Chapin allegedly told him, "You go back and tell Morgan he can’t intimidate me!"

== Gaynor photograph ==
One of Chapin's most celebrated coups was the publication of a photograph captured by an Evening World photographer showing the moment when New York mayor William Jay Gaynor was shot by a would-be assassin. William Warnecke, the photographer, who had been lining up a portrait of the mayor, snapped the shutter just as Gaynor crumpled to the ground; Chapin's response, when the developed photo arrived on his desk, was: "Blood all over him! And exclusive, too!"

== Wife's murder ==
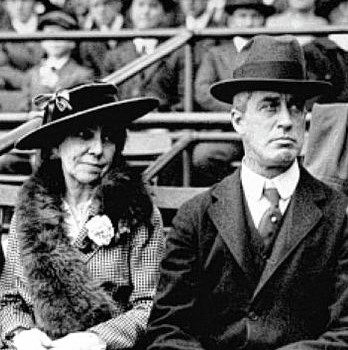
Nellie and Charles Chapin at the race track

Chapin's career in New York newspapers came to an end in September 1918 when, dogged by illness and debt, and concerned for his increasingly fragile wife of 38 years, he shot and killed his spouse while she was sleeping at the Cumberland Hotel on 54th and Broadway (now known as the Ameritania). News of the shooting shocked many of the newsman's colleagues. "They had known he would be involved in a murder some day," as Andy Logan wrote, "but had always assumed he would be the victim." Although he had apparently intended to commit suicide himself following the murder, the famous editor was instead arrested, convicted of the shooting, and sent to Sing Sing prison for a term of 20 years to life. There he wrote a memoir and became renowned for the rose garden he cultivated in the grounds, acquiring the nickname of "The Rose Man."

Chapin was offered the job as editor of the prison newspaper Sing Sing Bulletin by the prison's warden. The paper excelled under his leadership, and earned praise from several mainstream newspapers, gathering significant publicity for both Chapin and the prison. Disliking the attention, the New York prison system ordered the paper to be discontinued. Chapin later commented that he "made his prison newspaper so popular that it choked to death on its own popularity."

== Death ==
He died of pneumonia in Sing Sing on December 13, 1930.

== Opinions of Chapin ==
For two decades Chapin was the city editor of Joseph Pulitzer’s Evening World. Many newspapermen considered Chapin to be "the ablest city editor who ever lived". Those who worked for him, however, often hated him. When Irvin S. Cobb, the well-known World reporter, heard that his editor was sick, he is said to have looked up from his work and remarked, "I hope it’s nothing trivial." According to Andy Logan, a noted correspondent to The New Yorker, Chapin was "terrible tempered" and in the opinion of many of his staff had "a legendary imperviousness to human suffering, especially theirs." Pulitzer referred to Chapin as "Pinch" in the code the publisher used to mask his correspondence. It was suggested that by overemphasizing sensationalism Chapin became instrumental in propagating the yellow journalism style of newspaper reporting.

A character based on Chapin may be found in David Pietrusza's 2014 historical novel Dance Hall: A Novel of Sing Sing.
