= Toby Lyons =

American baseball player (1869–1920)

- Pitcher
- Born: March 27, 1869; Cambridge, Massachusetts, U.S.
- Died: August 27, 1920 (aged 51); Boston, Massachusetts, U.S.
- Batted: Unknown Threw: Unknown

MLB debut
- April 18, 1890, for the Syracuse Stars

Last MLB appearance
- May 2, 1890, for the Syracuse Stars

MLB statistics
- Win–loss record: 0–2
- Strikeouts: 6
- Earned run average: 10.48
- Stats at Baseball Reference

Teams
- Syracuse Stars (1890)

Thomas Arthur Lyons (March 27, 1869 – August 27, 1920) was a 19th-century American Major League Baseball player. He was a starting pitcher for the Syracuse Stars of the American Association in April and May 1890, starting three games.
