= Louis Graff =

American baseball player (1866–1955)

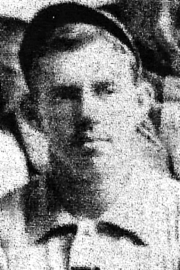
- Catcher
- Born: July 25, 1866; Philadelphia, Pennsylvania, U.S.
- Died: April 16, 1955 (aged 88); Bryn Mawr, Pennsylvania, U.S.
- Batted: Unknown Threw: Right

MLB debut
- June 23, 1890, for the Syracuse Stars

Last MLB appearance
- June 23, 1890, for the Syracuse Stars

MLB statistics
- Batting average: .400
- Home runs: 0
- Runs batted in: 3

Teams
- Syracuse Stars (1890)

Louis George Graff (July 25, 1866 – April 16, 1955) was a 19th-century American Major League Baseball catcher with the Syracuse Stars of the American Association. Nicknamed "Chappie", he appeared in one game for the Stars on June 23, 1890 and recorded 2 hits in 5 at-bats with 3 RBI.
