= Babe Doty =

American baseball player (1867–1929)

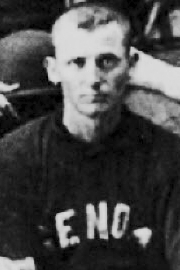
- Pitcher
- Born: December 17, 1867; Lyons, New York, U.S.
- Died: November 20, 1929 (aged 61); Toledo, Ohio, U.S.
- Batted: Left Threw: Right

MLB debut
- August 18, 1890, for the Toledo Maumees

Last MLB appearance
- August 18, 1890, for the Toledo Maumees

MLB statistics
- Win–loss record: 1–0
- Earned run average: 1
- Strikeouts: 4
- Stats at Baseball Reference

Teams
- Toledo Maumees (1890)

Elmer L. "Babe" Doty (December 17, 1867 – November 20, 1929) was an American pitcher in Major League Baseball. He played one game for the Toledo Maumees in 1890, giving up just one run in nine innings.

== Sources ==
- Career statistics from Baseball Reference · Baseball Reference (Minors) · Retrosheet · Baseball Almanac
