= St. Bernard Cemetery =

Cemetery in Worcester County, Massachusetts, US

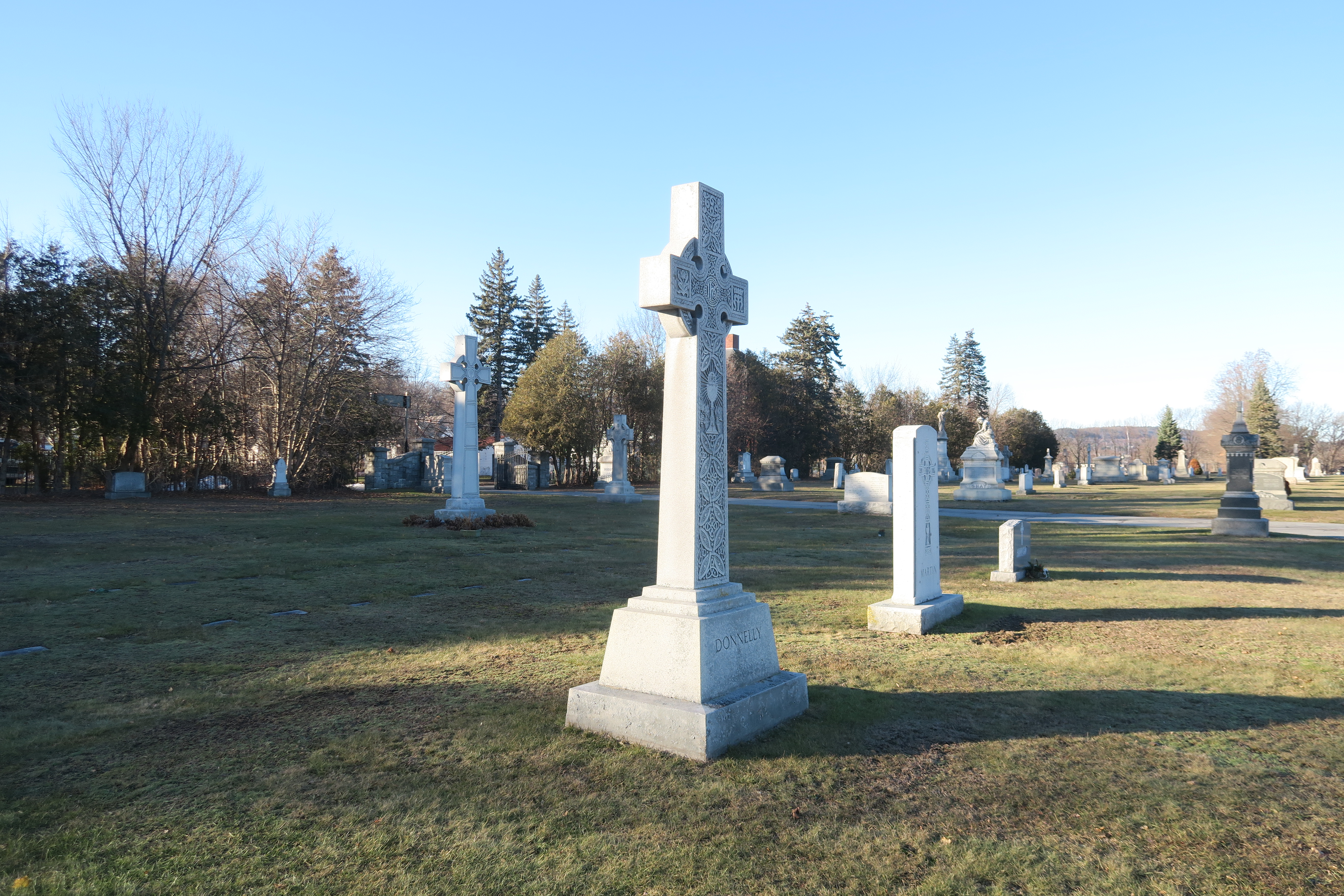
- Partial view of St. Bernard's Cemetery in 2016.

Details
- Location: Fitchburg, Massachusetts, US
- Country: United States
- Coordinates: 42°34′40″N 71°46′45″W
- Owned by: St. Bernard's Church
- No. of graves: ~11,000
- Find a Grave: St. Bernard Cemetery

St. Bernard Cemetery is a Roman Catholic cemetery, which is located in Fitchburg, Massachusetts, United States.

== History ==
St. Bernard Cemetery dates from the early to mid-nineteenth century and remains very active as it serves several local parishes in and around Fitchburg. In recent years, new areas of the cemetery have been opened to accommodate more plots. The land is arranged by sections named for Catholic saints, as well for nearby street names.

== Notable burials ==
- Nixey Callahan, Major League Baseball player
- James L. Conrad, president of Nichols College
- John T. Keefe, Major League Baseball player
- Pat Moran, Major League Baseball player
- Joseph Ward, 22nd Massachusetts Secretary of the Commonwealth
