= Grant Briggs =

American baseball player (1865–1928)

- Catcher / Outfielder
- Born: March 16, 1865; Pittsburgh, Pennsylvania, U.S.
- Died: May 31, 1928 (aged 63); Pittsburgh, Pennsylvania, U.S.
- Batted: Unknown Threw: Unknown

MLB debut
- April 17, 1890, for the Syracuse Stars

Last MLB appearance
- June 22, 1895, for the Louisville Colonels

MLB statistics
- Batting average: .164
- Home runs: 0
- Runs batted in: 22
- Stats at Baseball Reference

Teams
- Syracuse Stars (1890); Louisville Colonels (1891); St. Louis Browns (1892); Louisville Colonels (1895)

Grant Briggs (March 16, 1865 – May 31, 1928) was a 19th-century American Major League Baseball (MLB) catcher and outfielder. He began his professional baseball career in the Eastern League in 1887 and was playing with the Syracuse Stars of the International Association in 1889 when the Stars decided to join the American Association for the 1890 season. He appeared in 86 games for the Starrs and also played for the Louisville Colonels in 1891 and St. Louis Browns in 1892. He played minor league ball again in 1893 and was out of baseball in 1894 before he returned to the Colonels for one more game in 1895.
