= John Peltz =

American baseball player (1861–1906)

- Outfielder
- Born: April 23, 1861; New Orleans, Louisiana, C.S.
- Died: February 27, 1906 (aged 44); New Orleans, Louisiana, U.S.
- Batted: Right Threw: Right

MLB debut
- May 1, 1884, for the Indianapolis Hoosiers

Last MLB appearance
- October 13, 1890, for the Toledo Maumees

MLB statistics
- Batting average: .224
- Home runs: 4
- Runs scored: 106
- Stats at Baseball Reference

Teams
- Indianapolis Hoosiers (1884); Baltimore Orioles (1888); Brooklyn Gladiators (1890); Syracuse Stars (1890); Toledo Maumees (1890)

John Peltz (April 23, 1861 – February 27, 1906) was an American professional baseball player in the 19th century. Peltz first played with the Indianapolis Hoosiers, in 1884 at the age of 23. He batted .219 and surrendered 38 errors in the outfield. Peltz did not appear in major league baseball until 1890, except for a brief one-game appearance in 1888 with the Baltimore Orioles. In 1890, his last year in the major leagues, he played with three teams, the Brooklyn Gladiators, Syracuse Stars, and the Toledo Maumees. He would continue to play with various minor league clubs until 1893, retiring with the Montgomery Colts. Peltz had a career batting average of .224. He died in New Orleans on February 27, 1906, at the age of 44.

== Sources ==
- Career statistics from Baseball Reference · Baseball Reference (Minors) · Retrosheet · Baseball Almanac
