= Pat Friel =

American baseball player (1860–1924)

- Outfielder
- Born: June 11, 1860; Lewisburg, Virginia, U.S.
- Died: January 15, 1924 (aged 63); Providence, Rhode Island, U.S.
- Batted: Both Threw: Unknown

MLB debut
- July 13, 1890, for the Syracuse Stars

Last MLB appearance
- April 9, 1891, for the Philadelphia Athletics

MLB statistics
- Games played: 64
- Runs scored: 53
- Batting average: .249
- Stats at Baseball Reference

Teams
- Syracuse Stars (1890); Philadelphia Athletics (1891)

Patrick Henry Friel (June 11, 1860 – January 15, 1924) was an American professional baseball player. He played in Major League Baseball as an outfielder from 1890 to 1891.

Friel was born in Lewisburg, West Virginia, and his brother Bill Friel was also a professional baseball player. He began his minor league baseball career in 1883, and continued through the end of the 1896 season. During that timespan, he played for the notable minor league team, London Tecumsehs and two Major League Baseball teams, the Syracuse Stars in 1890, and the Philadelphia Athletics in 1891. Friel died at the age of 63 in Providence, Rhode Island, and is interred at St. Francis Cemetery in Pawtucket, Rhode Island.
