= Ezra Lincoln =

American baseball player (1868–1951)

- Pitcher
- Born: November 17, 1868; Raynham, Massachusetts, U.S.
- Died: May 7, 1951 (aged 82); Taunton, Massachusetts, U.S.
- Batted: Left Threw: Left

MLB debut
- May 2, 1890, for the Cleveland Spiders

Last MLB appearance
- August 12, 1890, for the Syracuse Stars

MLB statistics
- Win–loss record: 3-14
- Earned run average: 5.28
- Strikeouts: 28
- Stats at Baseball Reference

Teams
- Cleveland Spiders (1890); Syracuse Stars (1890)

Ezra Perry Lincoln (November 17, 1868 – May 7, 1951) was an American pitcher in Major League Baseball who played for the Cleveland Spiders and Syracuse Stars during the 1890 season. He continued to play in the minors through 1899, in the New England League.
