= Smyrna (baseball) =

- 1889; Smyrna, Delaware

Minor league affiliations
- Class: Independent (1889)
- League: Delaware State League (1889)

Major league affiliations
- Team: None

Minor league titles
- League titles (0): None

Team data
- Name: Smyrna (1889)
- Ballpark: Unknown (1889)

The Smyrna team was a minor league baseball team based in Smyrna, Delaware. In 1889, the Smyrna team played without a known moniker as a member of the Independent level Delaware State League.

== History ==
The Smyrna team was a charter member when the 1889 Delaware State League began minor league play as an Independent five–team league. The Delaware State League was formed with the teams in the Delaware cities of Camden, Dover, Milford and Wilmington joining Smyrna as charter members.

Evolving from local semi–professional baseball, the Delaware State League structure was that each team was allowed to pay eight players and the league had no residency requirements. There was controversy over Dover's signing of Bill Higgins, who had played in 14 major league games for the Boston Beaneaters the previous season. Smyrna claimed they had also signed Higgins. Dover threatened to fold their franchise over the dispute and review of the situation was resolved in favor of Dover.

The Delaware State League began play on July 8, 1889. A crowd of 600 was on hand to see Dover defeat Wilmington in the league opener. Smyrna began play under manager O.B. Voshell.

After beginning play weeks earlier, the Delaware State League permanently folded on July 25, 1889. Smyrna reportedly couldn't compete with other teams in player salaries and the team folded while in last place. Within two weeks, the entire league folded. The team records and standings on the folding date of July 25, 1889 were: Dover (8–2), Milford (6–5), Wilmington (5–4) Camden (3–6) and Smyrna (1–6).

Smyrna, Delaware has not hosted another minor league team.

== The ballpark ==
The name of the Smyrna home minor league ballpark in 1889 is not directly referenced.

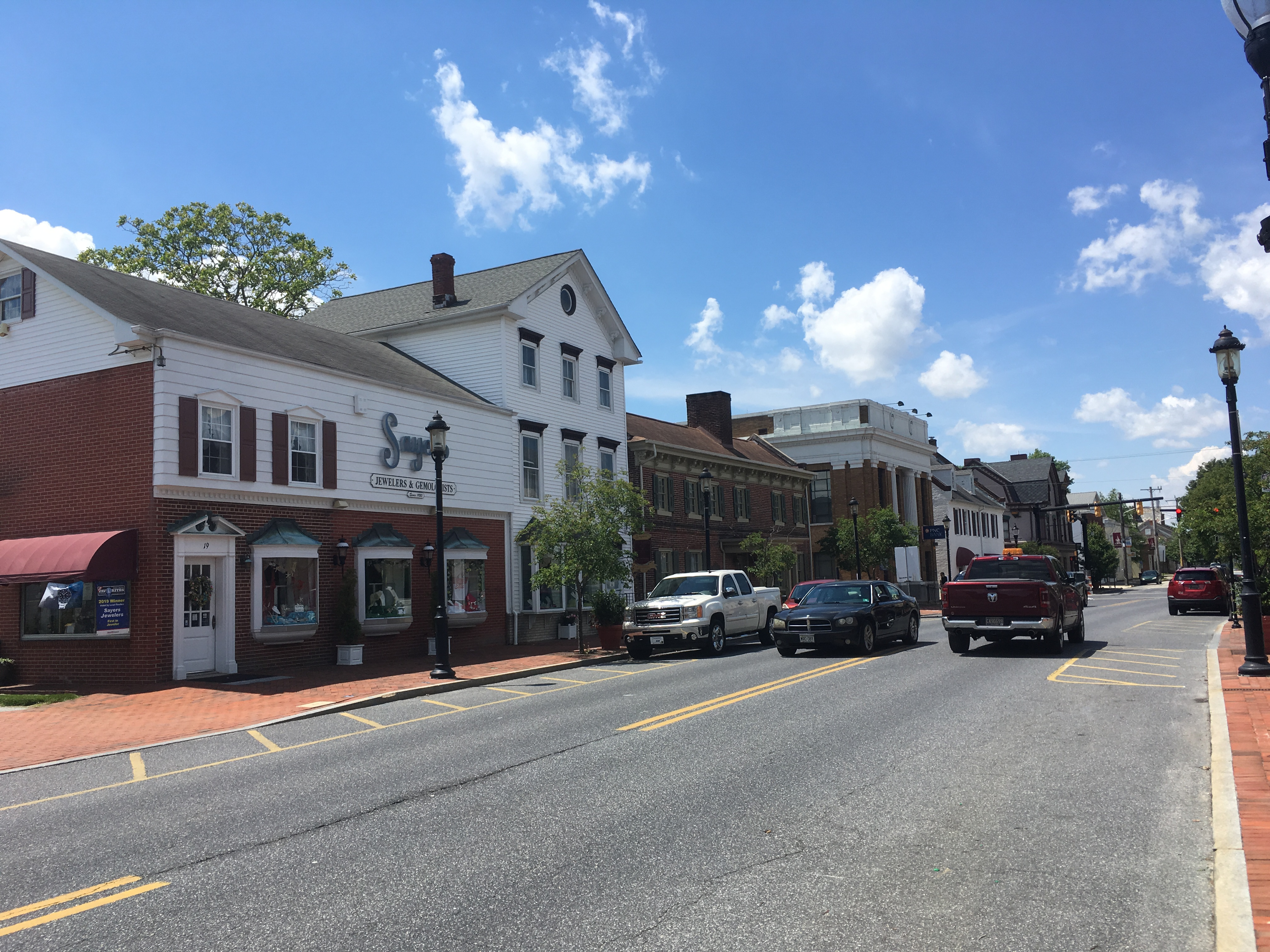
(2019) Main Street. Smyrna, Delaware

== Year-by-year record ==
Year	Record	Finish	Manager	Playoffs/
1889	1–6	5th	O.B. Voshell	League folded July 29

== Notable alumni ==
- Duke Esper (1889)
- Category:Smyrna (minor league baseball) players
