= Hank Simon =

American baseball player (1862–1925)

- Outfielder
- Born: August 25, 1862; Hawkinsville, New York, U.S.
- Died: January 1, 1925 (aged 62); Albany, New York, U.S.
- Batted: Left Threw: Left

MLB debut
- October 7, 1887, for the Cleveland Blues

Last MLB appearance
- October 12, 1890, for the Syracuse Stars

MLB statistics
- Batting average: .267
- Home runs: 2
- Runs batted in: 61
- Stats at Baseball Reference

Teams
- Cleveland Blues (1887); Brooklyn Gladiators (1890); Syracuse Stars (1890)

Henry Joseph Simon (August 25, 1862 - January 1, 1925) was an American Major League Baseball outfielder. He played two seasons in the majors, 1887 and 1890, all in the American Association. In 1887, he played in three games for the Cleveland Blues, then in 1890 he split the season between the Brooklyn Gladiators and Syracuse Stars. Simon's minor league baseball career spanned twenty seasons, from 1885 until 1904.

== Sources ==
- Career statistics from Baseball Reference · Baseball Reference (Minors) · Retrosheet · Baseball Almanac
