= Tub Welch =

American baseball player (1866–1901)

- Catcher/First baseman
- Born: July 23, 1866; St. Louis, Missouri, U.S.
- Died: November 7, 1901 (aged 35); St. Louis, Missouri, U.S.
- Batted: Unknown Threw: Right

MLB debut
- June 12, 1890, for the Toledo Maumees

Last MLB appearance
- August 16, 1895, for the Louisville Colonels

MLB statistics
- Batting average: .261
- Stolen bases: 9
- Runs batted in: 22
- Stats at Baseball Reference

Teams
- Toledo Maumees (1890); Louisville Colonels (1895)

James Thomas Welch (July 3, 1866 – November 7, 1901), nicknamed "Tub", was an American catcher and first baseman for Major League Baseball in the 19th century. Welch was 23 years old when he broke into the big leagues on June 12, 1890, with the Toledo Maumees.

== Sources ==
- Career statistics from Baseball Reference · Baseball Reference (Minors) · Retrosheet · Baseball Almanac
