= John Keefe (baseball) =

American baseball player (1866–1937)

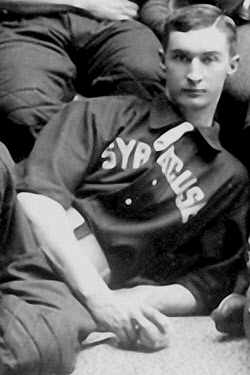
- Pitcher
- Born: July 16, 1867; Fitchburg, Massachusetts, U.S.
- Died: August 10, 1937 (aged 70); Fitchburg, Massachusetts, U.S.
- Batted: Unknown Threw: Left

MLB debut
- April 28, 1890, for the Syracuse Stars

Last MLB appearance
- October 11, 1890, for the Syracuse Stars

MLB statistics
- Earned run average: 4.32
- Record: 17-24
- Strikeouts: 120
- Stats at Baseball Reference

Teams
- Syracuse Stars (1890)

John Thomas Keefe (July 16, 1867 – August 10, 1937) was an American left-handed pitcher in Major League Baseball who played for the American Association Syracuse Stars in 1890. Born in Fitchburg, Massachusetts, he attended the College of the Holy Cross.

In his only big league season, Keefe went 17 and 24 with a 4.32 earned run average in 43 games for the unimpressive 55 and 72 Stars. He started 41 games, completed 36 games and shutout two. In just over 352 innings, he gave up 355 hits, 234 runs and 169 earned runs. He walked 148 batters and struck out 120.

Keefe's 17 wins were second on the team, trailing behind Dan Casey's 19. Not only did his 24 losses lead the team, they also tied for the league lead. He finished ninth in the league in games, innings pitched and shutouts, eighth in the league in games started, complete games and batters faced (1431), seventh in hit batsmen with 17, sixth in hits allowed, fifth in walks allowed, fourth in home runs allowed (nine) and third in earned runs allowed.

As a batter, Keefe collected 30 hits in 157 at-bats for a .191 batting average. His fielding percentage was .955. A 22-year-old, he made his big league debut on April 28. He played his final game on October 11.

He is buried in St. Bernard Cemetery in Fitchburg, Massachusetts.

His birth date has been verified by SABR research.
