= Ducky Hemp =

American baseball player (1862–1923)

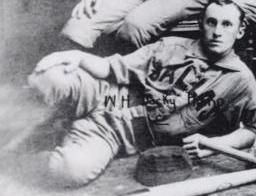
- Outfielder
- Born: December 27, 1862; St. Louis, Missouri, U.S.
- Died: March 3, 1923 (aged 60); St. Louis, Missouri, U.S.
- Batted: Unknown Threw: Unknown

MLB debut
- October 6, 1887, for the Louisville Colonels

Last MLB appearance
- August 25, 1890, for the Syracuse Stars

MLB statistics
- Batting average: .214
- Home runs: 0
- Runs batted in: 5
- Stats at Baseball Reference

Teams
- Louisville Colonels (1887); Pittsburgh Alleghenys (1890); Syracuse Stars (1890)

William H. "Ducky" Hemp (December 27, 1862 – March 3, 1923) was an American professional baseball player whose career spanned seven seasons. Hemp played two of those seven seasons in Major League Baseball. Over his major league career, Hemp compiled a batting average of .214 with 25 hits, 2 doubles, 2 triples, 5 RBIs, and 4 stolen bases.

== Professional career ==
=== Louisville Colonels ===
Before entering the major leagues, Hemp played in the minors with the Memphis Reds of the Southern League in 1885, and later the Wichita Braves of the Western League in 1887. With the Braves, Ducky was noted as a fan favorite, and his nickname "Ducky" was given to him while he played with the Braves. Hemp would later become the first player from the Braves to play in the majors. Later in 1887, Hemp joined the major league Louisville Colonels. In 1 game with the Colonels, Hemp got 1 hit, 1 run, 1 double, and 1 base on balls in 4 plate appearances. He played the entire game in the outfield as well.

=== Pittsburgh Alleghenys ===
After he parted with the Colonels, Hemp played the rest of the 1887 season with the minor league Lincoln Tree Planters of the Western League. In 1888, Hemp again played in the minors, this time with the Dallas Hams of the Texas League. The next season, Hemp played with the Evansville Hoosiers of the Central Interstate League. In 1890, Hemp returned to the majors, this time with the Pittsburgh Alleghenys of the National League. Hemp played 21 games with the Alleghenys, and batted .235 with 19 hits, 2 doubles, 4 RBIs, and 3 stolen bases. On the defensive side, Hemp played all of his 21 games in the outfield and committed 6 errors.

=== Syracuse Stars ===
Hemp played the rest of the 1890 season with the major league Syracuse Stars. In 9 games with the Stars, Hemp batted .152 with 5 hits, 1 doubles, 1 RBI, and 1 stolen base. In the field, Hemp played all of his 9 games in the outfield, and committed 1 error.

=== Later career ===
After his major league career was over, Hemp played in the minor leagues. He spent the rest of the 1890 season with the Lincoln Rustlers (who later that season became the Des Moines Prohibitionist) of the Western Association. In 1891, Hemp played for the Green Bay, Wisconsin based, Green Bay Dock Wallopers baseball club of the Wisconsin State League, the Terre Haute Hottentots of the Northwestern League, and the Peoria Distillers, also of the Northwestern League. Hemp's final season in professional baseball came in 1892 with the Rock Island-Moline Twins, and the Terre Haute Hottentots, both of the Illinois–Indiana League.

== Death ==
Hemp died on March 3, 1923, in his hometown of St. Louis, Missouri, at the age of 60. He was buried at Calvary Cemetery in St. Louis.
