= Frank Keffer =

American baseball player (1861–1923)

- Pitcher
- Born: July 1, 1861; Lancaster, Pennsylvania, US
- Died: April 17, 1923 (aged 61); Harrisburg, Pennsylvania, US
- Batted: Unknown Threw: Unknown

MLB debut
- April 19, 1890, for the Syracuse Stars

Last MLB appearance
- May 3, 1890, for the Syracuse Stars

MLB statistics
- Win–loss record: 1–1
- Strikeouts: 4
- Earned run average: 5.63
- Stats at Baseball Reference

Teams
- Syracuse Stars (1890)

Charles Franklin Keffer (July 1, 1867 – April 17, 1923) was an American Major League Baseball player who played during the late 19th century. He was a pitcher for the Syracuse Stars of the American Association in April and May 1890, appearing in two games.
