= Tom O'Rourke (baseball) =

American baseball player (1865–1929)

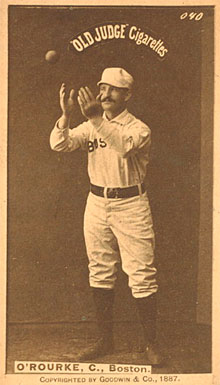
- Catcher
- Born: October 1865; New York City, U.S.
- Died: July 19, 1929 (aged 63); New York City, U.S.
- Batted: Unknown Threw: Right

MLB debut
- May 11, 1887, for the Boston Beaneaters

Last MLB appearance
- August 1, 1890, for the Syracuse Stars

MLB statistics
- Batting average: .186
- Home runs: 0
- Runs batted in: 26
- Stats at Baseball Reference

Teams
- Boston Beaneaters (1887–1888); New York Giants (1890); Syracuse Stars (1890)

Thomas Joseph O'Rourke (October 1865 – July 19, 1929) was an American 19th-century Major League Baseball catcher born in New York, New York.
