= Parson Nicholson =

American baseball player (1863–1917)

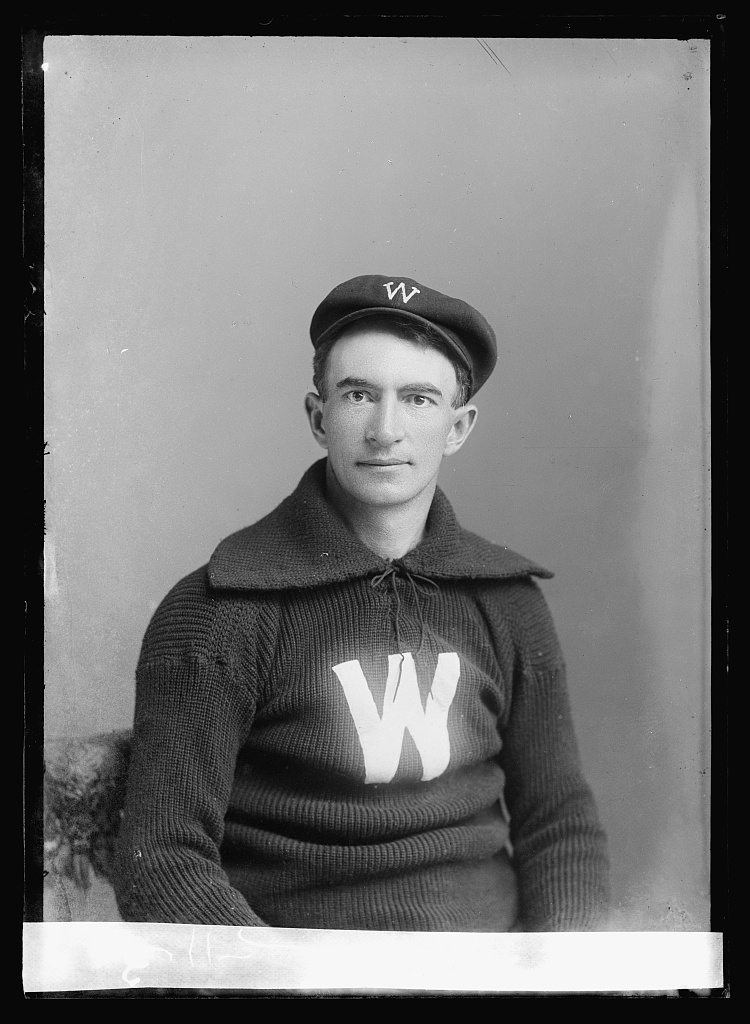
- Nicholson in Washington Senators uniform
- Second baseman
- Born: April 14, 1863; Blaine, Ohio, U.S.
- Died: February 28, 1917 (aged 53); Bellaire, Ohio, U.S.
- Batted: Right Threw: Unknown

MLB debut
- September 14, 1888, for the Detroit Wolverines

Last MLB appearance
- May 6, 1895, for the Washington Senators

MLB statistics
- Batting average: .262
- Home runs: 5
- Runs batted in: 86
- Stats at Baseball Reference

Teams
- Detroit Wolverines (1888); Toledo Maumees (1890); Washington Senators (1895)

Thomas Clark "Parson" Nicholson (April 14, 1863 – February 28, 1917) was an American baseball player whose career spanned from 1887 to 1899. He played principally as a second baseman and in the minor leagues. He did play three seasons in Major League Baseball for the Detroit Wolverines in 1888, the Toledo Maumees in 1890, and the Washington Senators in 1895.

Nicholson's only full season in the major leagues came in 1890 with Toledo when he appeared in 134 games, all at second base, and compiled a .268 batting average with 11 triples, four home runs, 72 RBIs and 46 stolen bases. Over the course of 12 minor league seasons, Nicholson appeared in 837 games and compiled a .303 batting average with 48 triples, 37 home runs, and 354 stolen bases.

== Early years and nickname ==
Nicholson was born in Blaine, Ohio, in 1863. He received the nickname "Parson" because he refused to play baseball on Sundays.

== Professional baseball career ==
=== Ohio minor leagues ===
Nicholson began his professional baseball career playing for minor league clubs in Columbus, Barnesville, and Wooster, Ohio, and in Lancaster, Pennsylvania. In 1887, at age 24, he compiled a .357 batting average playing in the Ohio State League for teams in Wheeling, West Virginia, and Steubenville, Ohio.

=== Detroit and Toledo ===
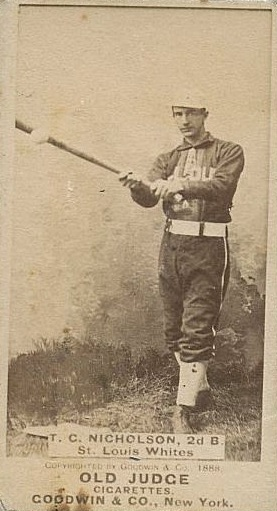
1888 baseball card of Nicholson

In 1888, Nicholson played for the St. Louis Whites in the Western Association. He joined the Detroit Wolverines late in the season, making his major league debut on September 14, 1888. He appeared in 24 games as a second baseman for Detroit and compiled a .259 batting average.

The 1888 Detroit team finished in fifth place with a 68-63 record. With high salaries owed to the team's star players, and gate receipts declining markedly, the team folded in October 1888 with the players being sold to other teams. Nicholson was acquired by the Cleveland Spiders, but the Spiders sold Nicholson to the Toledo Mud Hens of the International League in May 1889 for $500. Nicholson appeared in 87 games for the Mud Hens in 1889 and moved with the team when they joined the American Association and became the Toledo Maumees in 1890. Nicholson appeared in 134 games, all at second base, for the Maumees in 1890, his lengthiest stint in the majors. He compiled a .268 batting average with 11 triples, four home runs, 72 RBIs and 46 stolen bases.

=== Return to the minors ===
In 1891, Nicholson returned to the minor leagues, playing for the Sioux City Huskers in the Western Association. During the 1892 season, Nicholson played for three different teams—Joliet/Aurora in the Illinois-Iowa League, Chattanooga in the Southern Association, and Toledo in the Western League.

Nicholson then spent the 1893 and 1894 seasons playing for Erie in the Eastern League. He totaled 141 stolen bases in two seasons with Erie and compiled batting averages of .306 and .333.

=== Washington ===
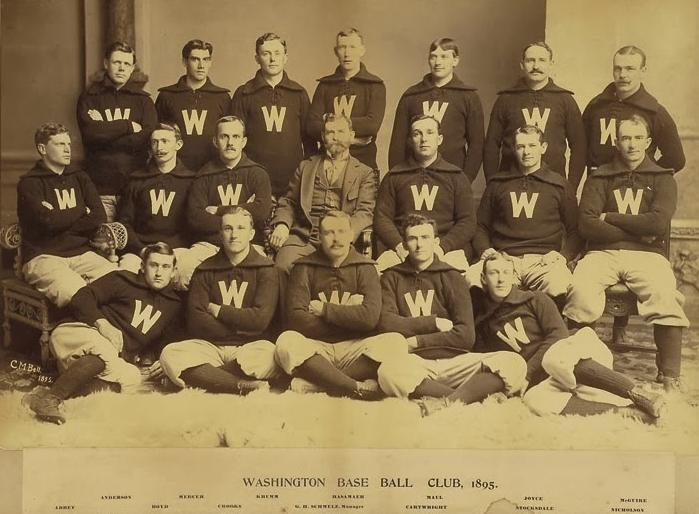
Nicholson (middle row, far right) with the 1895 Washington Senators

In 1895, Nicholson returned to the major leagues with the Washington Senators. In 10 games for Washington, he compiled a .184 batting average with a triple, five RBIs and six stolen bases. He appeared in his final major league game on May 6, 1895.

=== Final years in the minors ===
After being released by the Senators, Nicholson signed with the Detroit Tigers, then of the Western League. During the 1895 season, he hit .348 in 81 games for the Tigers and had three triples and nine home runs. He had the second highest batting average on the Detroit club in 1895.

Nicholson continued to play in the minors through the 1899 season. He split the 1897 season playing with three Western League teams and played the 1898 season for Newark in the Atlantic League and Kansas City in the Western League. He concluded his playing career in 1899 as a player-manager for Wheeling in the Interstate League.

=== Career totals ===
Over three major league seasons, Nicholson appeared in 168 games, 158 of them at second base. He compiled a .262 batting average with 15 triples, five home runs, 86 RBIs, and 58 stolen bases.

Nicholson also appeared in 837 minor league games, 640 at second base, over a span of 12 seasons. During his minor league career, he batted .303 with 48 triples, 37 home runs, and 354 stolen bases.

== Later years ==
While still an active ball player, Nicholson became the principal owner of a shoe business in Bellaire, Ohio, known as Nicholson and Ball. He continued to operate the shoe business after his playing career ended. He was also elected as the mayor of Bellaire in 1903 and was the superintendent of the Trinity Lutheran Church for 25 years. Nicholson died in Bellaire in 1917 at age 53 from lobar pneumonia caused by tuberculosis. He was interred at the Rose Hill Cemetery in Bellaire.
