= Floyd Ritter =

American baseball player (1870–1943)

- Catcher
- Born: June 1, 1870; Dorset, Ohio, U.S.
- Died: February 7, 1943 (aged 72); Stevenson, Washington, U.S.
- Batted: Right Threw: Right

MLB debut
- June 4, 1890, for the Toledo Maumees

Last MLB appearance
- June 4, 1890, for the Toledo Maumees

MLB statistics
- Batting average: .000
- Runs: 0
- Runs batted in: 0
- Stats at Baseball Reference

Teams
- Toledo Maumees (1890)

Floyd Ritter (June 1, 1870 – February 7, 1943) was an American catcher in Major League Baseball. He played one game for the Toledo Maumees in 1890, and had no hits in three at-bats.

== Sources ==
- Career statistics from MLB · Baseball Reference · Fangraphs · Baseball Reference (Minors) · Retrosheet · Baseball Almanac
