= Bill Van Dyke =

American baseball player (1863–1933)

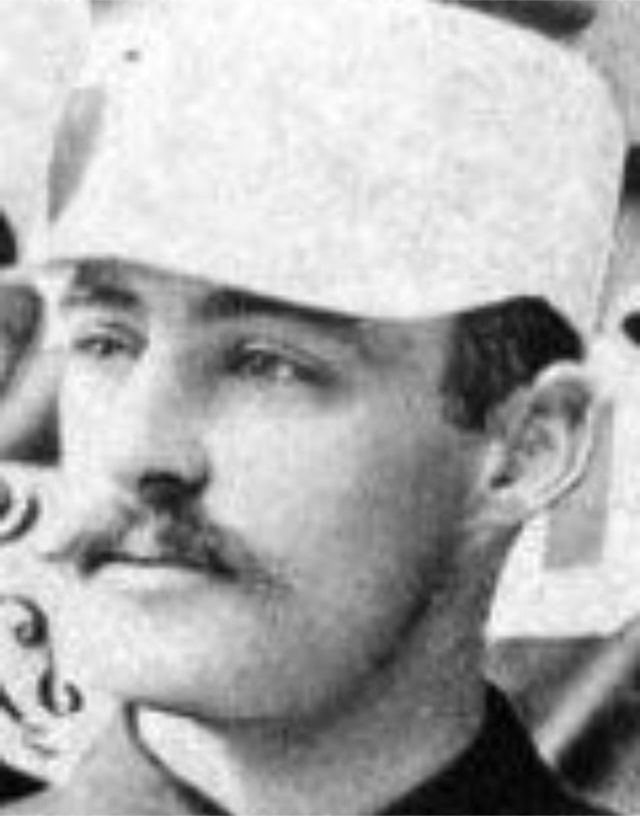
- Left fielder
- Born: December 15, 1863; Paris, Illinois, U.S.
- Died: May 17, 1933 (aged 69); El Paso, Texas, U.S.
- Batted: Right Threw: Right

MLB debut
- April 17, 1890, for the Toledo Maumees

Last MLB appearance
- September 30, 1893, for the Boston Beaneaters

MLB statistics
- Batting average: .253
- Home runs: 2
- Runs batted in: 56
- Stats at Baseball Reference

Teams
- Toledo Maumees (1890); St. Louis Browns (1892); Boston Beaneaters (1893)

William Jennings Van Dyke (December 15, 1863 – May 5, 1933) was an American professional baseball outfielder from 1884 to 1897.

== Career ==
Van Dyke was born in Paris, Illinois, in 1863. He played on many different teams during his professional baseball career. Van Dyke was regarded as a poor hitter but was very fast. In 1887, he led the Northwestern League with 108 stolen bases while playing for the Des Moines Hawkeyes.

Van Dyke made his major league debut with the Toledo Maumees of the American Association in 1890. As the Maumees' left fielder, he had a .257 batting average, 2 home runs, and 54 runs batted in. He ranked third in the AA with 73 stolen bases. Van Dyke hit for the cycle on July 5, 1890. This was his only full season in the majors.

Van Dyke also played four games for the National League's St. Louis Browns in 1892 and three games for the NL's Boston Beaneaters in 1893.

He died in El Paso, Texas, in 1933.

== See also ==
- List of Major League Baseball players to hit for the cycle

Achievements
Preceded by Mike Tiernan	Hitting for the cycle July 5, 1890	Succeeded by Jumbo Davis
