= Bill Sullivan (pitcher) =

American baseball player (1868–1905)

- Pitcher
- Born: December 1868; Providence, Rhode Island, U.S.
- Died: October 8, 1905 (aged 36); Providence, Rhode Island, U.S.
- Batted: Right Threw: Right

MLB debut
- April 19, 1890, for the Syracuse Stars

Last MLB appearance
- June 23, 1890, for the Syracuse Stars

MLB statistics
- Win–loss record: 1–4
- Strikeouts: 13
- Earned run average: 7.93
- Stats at Baseball Reference

Teams
- Syracuse Stars (1890)

William F. Sullivan (December 1868 – October 8, 1905) was an American professional baseball player. He appeared in six games in Major League Baseball for the Syracuse Stars of the American Association in 1890, all as a starting pitcher.
