= Dan Abbott =

American baseball player (1862–1930)

- Pitcher
- Born: March 16, 1862; Portage, Ohio, U.S.
- Died: February 13, 1930 (aged 67); Ottawa Lake, Michigan, U.S.
- Batted: Right Threw: Right

MLB debut
- April 19, 1890, for the Toledo Maumees

Last MLB appearance
- May 23, 1890, for the Toledo Maumees

MLB statistics
- Win–loss record: 0–2
- Earned run average: 6.23
- Strikeouts: 1
- Stats at Baseball Reference

Teams
- Toledo Maumees (1890)

Leander Franklin "Big Dan" Abbott (March 16, 1862 – February 13, 1930) was an American pitcher in Major League Baseball. He appeared in three games for the Toledo Maumees in 1890, with a record of 0–2.
