= Charlie Sprague =

American baseball player (1864–1912)

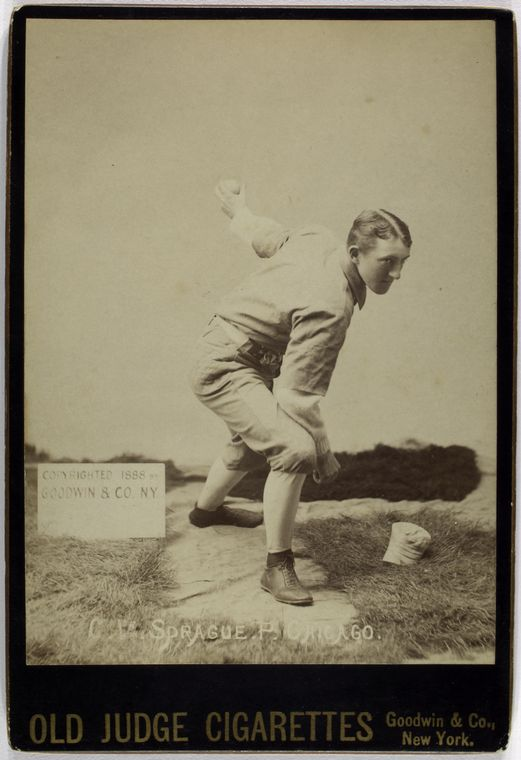
- Charlie Sprague, Chicago White Stockings, Pitcher, Old Judge Cigarettes
- Pitcher
- Born: October 10, 1864; Cleveland, Ohio, U.S.
- Died: December 31, 1912 (aged 48); Des Moines, Iowa, U.S.
- Batted: Left Threw: Left

MLB debut
- September 17, 1887, for the Chicago White Stockings

Last MLB appearance
- October 10, 1890, for the Toledo Maumees

MLB statistics
- Win–loss record: 10–7
- Earned run average: 4.51
- Strikeouts: 76
- Stats at Baseball Reference

Teams
- Chicago White Stockings (1887); Cleveland Spiders (1889); Toledo Maumees (1890)

Charlie Sprague (October 10, 1864 – December 31, 1912) was an American outfielder and pitcher in Major League Baseball in 1887, 1889, and 1890. Sprague played for the Chicago White Stockings, Cleveland Spiders, and Toledo Maumees.

== Sources ==
- Career statistics from Baseball Reference · Baseball Reference (Minors) · Retrosheet · Baseball Almanac
