= Billy Alvord =

American baseball player (1863–1927)

- Third baseman
- Born: August 10, 1863; St. Louis, Missouri, U.S.
- Died: April 7, 1927 (aged 63); St. Petersburg, Florida, U.S.
- Batted: Both Threw: Right

MLB debut
- April 30, 1885, for the St. Louis Maroons

Last MLB appearance
- July 8, 1893, for the Cleveland Spiders

MLB statistics
- Batting average: .253
- Home runs: 3
- Runs batted in: 109
- Stats at Baseball Reference

Teams
- St. Louis Maroons (1885); Kansas City Cowboys (1889); Toledo Maumees (1890); Cleveland Spiders (1891); Washington Statesmen (1891); Cleveland Spiders (1893)

William Crawford "Uncle Bill" Alvord (August 10, 1863 in St. Louis, Missouri – April 7, 1927 in St. Petersburg, Florida) was an American professional baseball third baseman. He played all or part of five seasons in Major League Baseball between 1885 and 1893.

Alvord made his major league debut in 1885, his first professional season, appearing in two games for the National League St. Louis Maroons, which had played the previous year in the short-lived Union Association. He was one of several players the Maroons tried in place of their regular third baseman, Ed Caskin, who was in the midst of a poor season in which he batted just .179. However, Alvord was unable to get a hit in his two games, and he returned to the minor leagues for the next several seasons.

Alvord's next chance in the majors came in 1889 with the Kansas City Cowboys, a team in the American Association, who acquired him from the minor league Toledo Black Pirates for second baseman Sam Barkley in July. He soon took over as the team's starting third baseman for Jumbo Davis, who was released a few weeks later.

The Cowboys folded after the season, and Alvord was picked up by the AA's Toledo Maumees, a new team to the league -- but not a new team to Alvord, as they were actually the Black Pirates under a new name in a more prestigious league. 1890 would prove to be Alvord's best season statistically, setting career highs in most categories, including finishing third in the league in triples with 16. The season would not be as good for the Maumees, who folded after a single season, and Alvord's contract was sold to the NL's Cleveland Spiders.

However, after just thirteen games, Alvord was headed back to the AA, as he joined yet another newly-organized team, the Washington Statesmen, who had purchased his contract from Cleveland. He spent the rest of the season as the team's primary third baseman, but his statistics took a nosedive from the previous season. The entire American Association folded after the season, and while the Statesmen made the move to the NL and became the Senators, Alvord would not go with them, as he returned to the minors in 1892. He was given one more chance by the Spiders in 1893, but he lasted just three games in what would wind up as his last season in professional baseball.
