= George Proeser =

American baseball player (1864–1941)

- Pitcher / Right fielder
- Born: May 30, 1864; Cincinnati
- Died: October 13, 1941 (aged 77); New Burlington, Ohio
- Batted: Left Threw: Left

MLB debut
- September 15, 1888, for the Cleveland Blues

Last MLB appearance
- July 10, 1890, for the Syracuse Stars

MLB statistics
- Win–loss record: 3–4
- Strikeouts: 20
- Earned run average: 3.81
- Batting average: .263
- Home runs: 1
- RBI: 7
- Stats at Baseball Reference

Teams
- Cleveland Blues (1888); Syracuse Stars (1890)

George "Yatz" Proeser (May 30, 1864 – October 13, 1941) was a starting pitcher and right fielder in Major League Baseball who played for the Cleveland Blues (1888) and Syracuse Stars (1890) teams of the American Association. Listed at 5 ft 10 in (1.78 m), 190 lb., Proeser batted and threw left-handed. He was born in Cincinnati.

In a two-season career, Proeser posted a 3–4 record with a 3.81 ERA in seven pitching appearances, all complete games including one shutout, giving up 25 earned runs on 53 hits and 30 walks while striking out 20 in 59.0 innings of work. As a hitter, he collected a .263 batting average (20-for-76) with one home run and seven RBI in 20 games, including 16 runs, three doubles, one triple, one stolen base, and a .356 on-base percentage.

Proeser died in New Burlington, Ohio, at the age of 77.
