= Tim O'Rourke =

American baseball player (1864–1938)

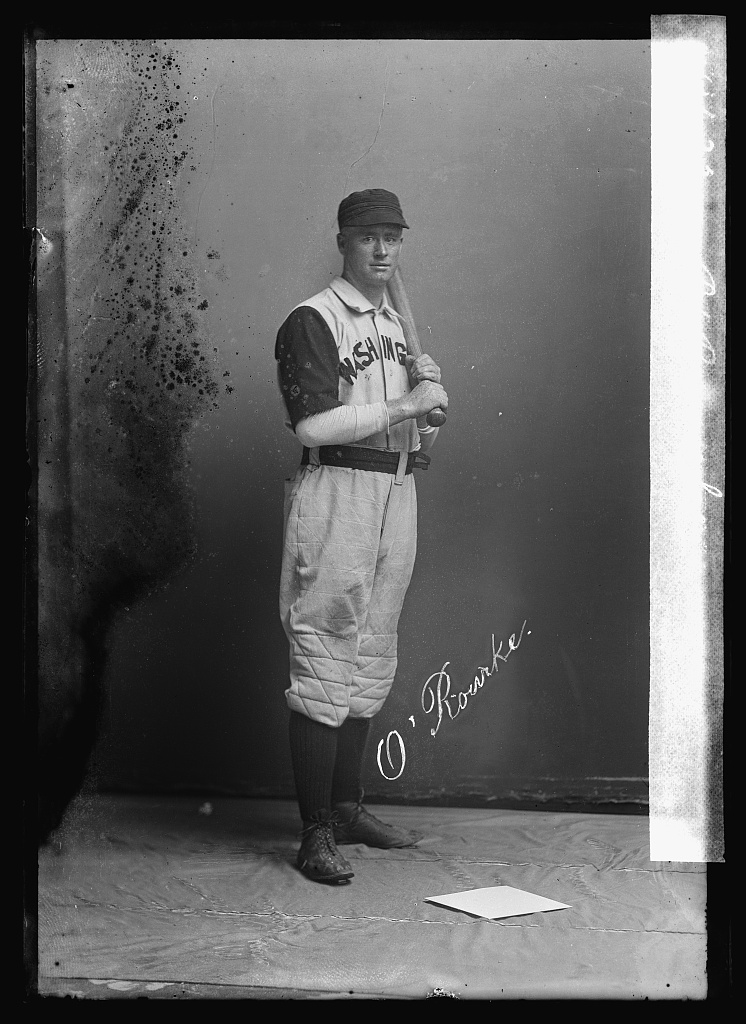
- O'Rourke in Washington Senators uniform
- Infielder
- Born: May 18, 1864; Chicago, Illinois, U.S.
- Died: April 20, 1938 (aged 73); Seattle, Washington, U.S.
- Batted: Left Threw: Right

MLB debut
- May 27, 1890, for the Syracuse Stars

Last MLB appearance
- August 7, 1894, for the Washington Senators

MLB statistics
- Batting average: .291
- Home runs: 1
- Runs batted in: 204
- Stats at Baseball Reference

Teams
- Syracuse Stars (1890); Columbus Solons (1891); Baltimore Orioles (1892–93); Louisville Colonels (1893–94); St. Louis Browns (1894); Washington Senators (1894)

Timothy Patrick O'Rourke (May 18, 1864 – April 20, 1938), nicknamed Voiceless Tim, was an American Major League Baseball player. He played five seasons in the majors, from 1890 until 1894, for six different teams. He was primarily an infielder, playing two-thirds of his games at either third base or shortstop.
