= Wallace Fessenden =

American baseball manager

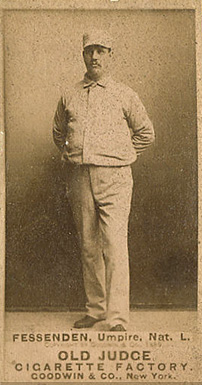
- Manager
- Born: October 5, 1860; Windham, New Hampshire, U.S.
- Died: May 16, 1935 (aged 74); Brooklyn, New York, U.S.
- Batted: Unknown Threw: Unknown

MLB statistics
- Managerial record: 4–7
- Games: 11
- Winning percentage: .364

Teams
- Syracuse Stars (1890)

Wallace Clifton Fessenden (October 5, 1860 – May 16, 1935) was an American 19th-century Major League Baseball manager with the Syracuse Stars in 1890 of the American Association. He briefly managed the Stars to a record of 4–7, while filling in for George Frazier. He also briefly was a player/manager for the Lynn team in the Massachusetts State Association in 1884 and as manager for Salem of the New England League in 1888.

Fessenden also umpired in the National League in 1889 and 1890. He umpired a total of 53 games.
