= George Frazier (baseball manager) =

American baseball executive and manager

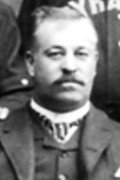
- Owner / Manager
- Born: January 7, 1861; Syracuse, New York, U.S.
- Died: February 5, 1913 (aged 52); New York, New York, U.S.

MLB statistics
- Managerial record: 51–65
- Games: 117
- Winning percentage: .440
- Managerial record at Baseball Reference

Teams
- Syracuse Stars (1890)

George Kasson Frazier (January 7, 1861 – February 5, 1913) was a 19th-century professional baseball executive. He was the owner and manager of the Syracuse Stars of the American Association, considered a major league, during the 1890 season.

He managed the Stars to a record of 51–65. The team also went 4–7 in 11 games managed by Wallace Fessenden in mid-season. The Stars finished in seventh place, and folded at the conclusion of the season.

He was married to Mary Yale, daughter of Colonel John Wesley Yale, member of the Yale family.
