= Mike Morrison (baseball) =

American baseball player (1867–1955)

- Pitcher
- Born: February 6, 1867; Erie, Pennsylvania, U.S.
- Died: June 16, 1955 (aged 88); Erie, Pennsylvania, U.S.
- Batted: Right Threw: Right

MLB debut
- April 19, 1887, for the Cleveland Spiders

Last MLB appearance
- September 21, 1890, for the Baltimore Orioles

MLB statistics
- Earned run average: 5.14
- Record: 20-39
- Strikeouts: 254
- Stats at Baseball Reference

Teams
- Cleveland Spiders (1887–1888); Syracuse Stars (1890); Baltimore Orioles (1890)

Michael Morrison (February 6, 1867 – June 16, 1955) was an American right-handed professional baseball player who was a pitcher from 1887 to 1888 and in 1890 for the Cleveland Spiders, Syracuse Stars and Baltimore Orioles.

Not much is known about Morrison's career prior to the major leagues. He played for a team known as the Erie Jarecki Manufacturing nine in 1884 and in 1885, he played with a team known as the Erie Olympics.

Morrison was purchased from the New York Metropolitans for $500 in January, 1887, and he played in his first big league game on April 19, 1887. That season he went 12-25 with a 4.92 ERA in 316 2/3 innings. In 40 games started, he had 35 complete games, 205 walks and 158 strikeouts. He led the league in home runs allowed (13) and walks allowed, he finished second in strikeouts per nine innings (4.49), fourth in hit batsmen (22), sixth in strikeouts and losses, and eighth in earned runs allowed. His 22 hit batsmen are tied for ninth most all time among rookie pitchers.

He appeared in only four games in 1888, going 1-3 with a 5.40 ERA.

In 1890, Morrison split time with two teams, the Stars and Orioles. He went 7-11 with a 5.53 ERA that season, making 21 appearances (18 starts) and completing 16 games. His 21 wild pitches were seventh in the league and his three games finished were ninth. His 4.82 strikeouts per nine innings were also ninth in the league.

He played his final big league game on September 21, 1890.

Overall, Morrison went 20-39 with a 5.14 ERA in 65 career games (62 starts). He had 55 complete games, 325 walks and 254 strikeouts in 504 2/3 innings. As a hitter, he hit .213 in 287 career at-bats.
