= Ed Swartwood =

American baseball player and umpire (1859–1924)

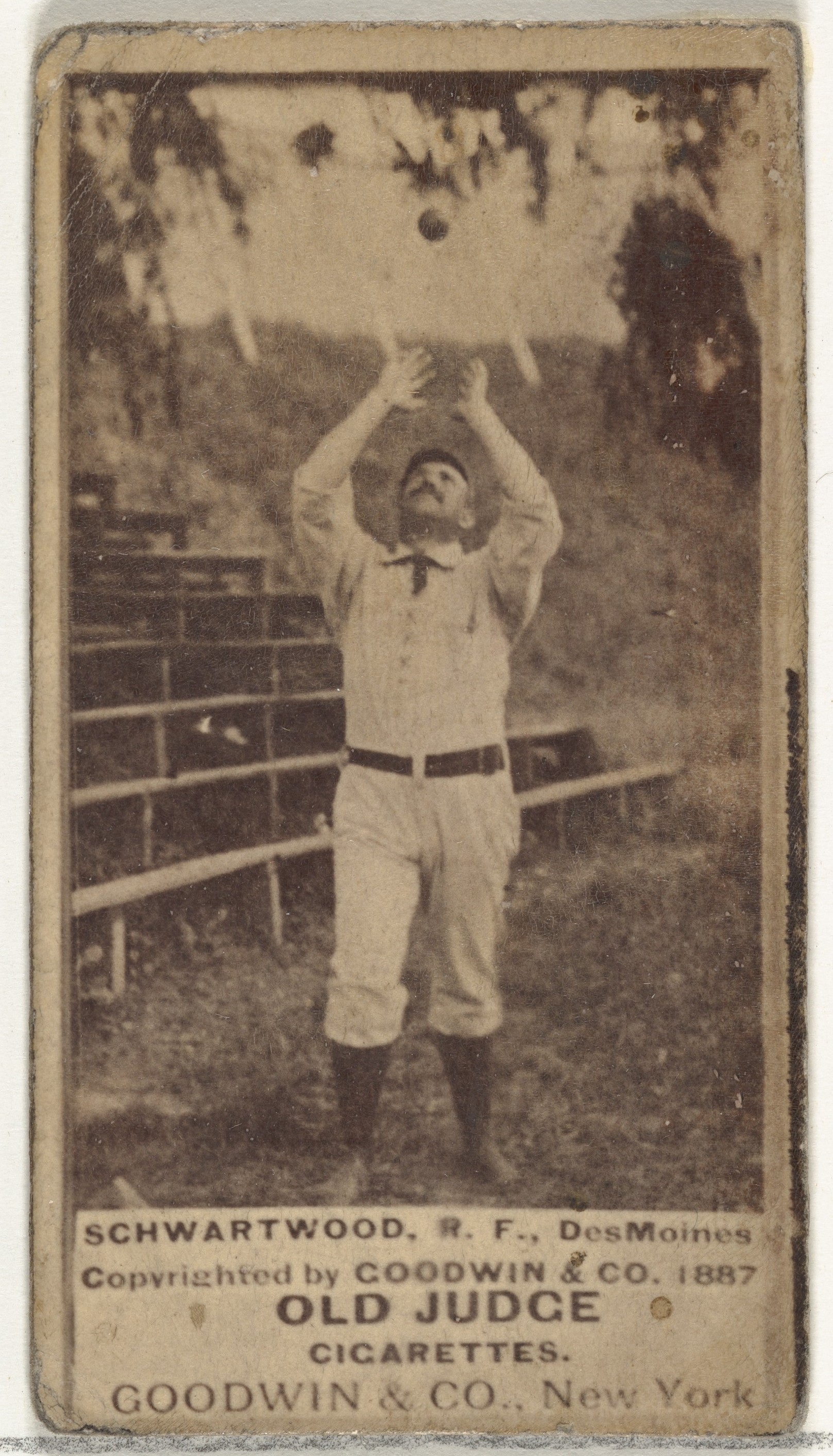
- Outfielder / Umpire
- Born: January 12, 1859; Rockford, Illinois, U.S.
- Died: May 15, 1924 (aged 65); Pittsburgh, Pennsylvania, U.S.
- Batted: Left Threw: Right

MLB debut
- August 11, 1881, for the Buffalo Bisons

Last MLB appearance
- May 21, 1892, for the Pittsburgh Pirates

MLB statistics
- Batting average: .300
- Home runs: 14
- Runs scored: 608
- Stats at Baseball Reference

Teams
- Buffalo Bisons (1881); Pittsburgh Alleghenys (1882–84); Brooklyn Grays (1885–87); Toledo Maumees (1890); Pittsburgh Pirates (1892)

Career highlights and awards
- American Association batting champion: 1883; American Association hits leader: 1883; American Association runs scored leader: 1882

Cyrus Edward Swartwood (January 12, 1859 – May 15, 1924) was an American professional baseball player and umpire. He played all or part of nine seasons in Major League Baseball, primarily as a right fielder and first baseman. Swartwood played for the Buffalo Bisons (1881), Pittsburgh Alleghenys/Pirates (1882–84, 1892), Brooklyn Grays (1885–87), and Toledo Maumees (1890). A native of Rockford, Illinois, he stood 5 feet 11 inches (1.80 m) and weighed 198 pounds (90 kg).

In 1882, Swartwood led the American Association in runs (87), doubles (18), and total bases (161). He was the league batting champion in 1883 with a .357 average and also led the league in hits (147) and OPS+ (188). Swartwood finished in the top 10 in many offensive categories during his career, including batting average (three times), on-base percentage (five times), slugging percentage (three times), and bases on balls (six times).

Swartwood's MLB career totals included 725 games played, a .300 batting average, 863 hits, 14 home runs, and 608 runs scored. He played in the minor leagues until 1893. After his playing career was over, Swartwood became an umpire. He umpired in the majors in 1894 and then from 1898 through 1900, totaling 429 games.

Swartwood died at the age of 65 in Pittsburgh, Pennsylvania, and is interred at Union Dale Cemetery in that city.

== See also ==
- List of Major League Baseball batting champions
- List of Major League Baseball annual doubles leaders
- List of Major League Baseball annual runs scored leaders
