= Syracuse State School =

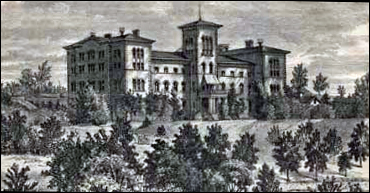

Information
- Established: 1851
- Closed: 1998

The Syracuse State School was a residential facility in Syracuse, New York, for mentally disabled children and adults. Founded in 1851 in Albany, New York, as the New York State Asylum for Idiots, its first director was Hervey B. Wilbur, a student of Edward Seguin (another of Seguin's students was Maria Montessori). In 1855, the facility moved to a new building in Syracuse where it was known as the New York Asylum for Idiots or the State Idiot Asylum.

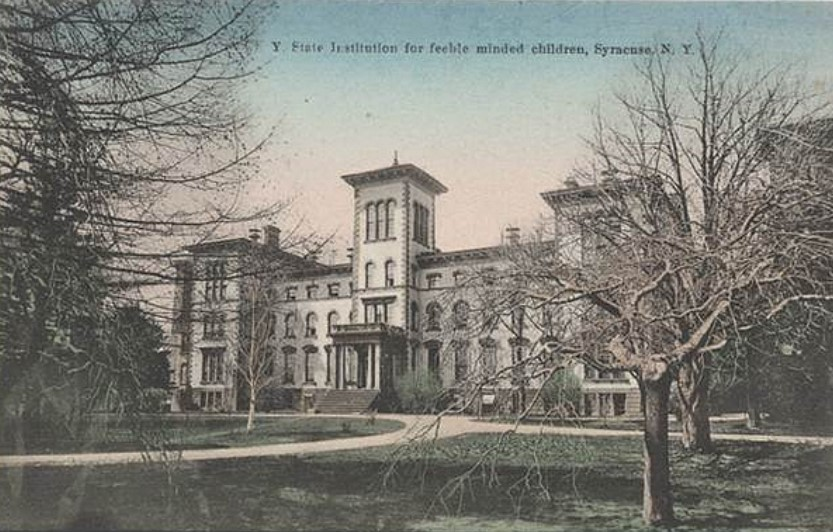
New York State Asylum, Syracuse, NY State

Over the next hundred years the institution went through several name changes, including the Syracuse State Institution for Feeble-Minded Children, the Syracuse State School for Mental Defectives, and finally the Syracuse State School. One of its managers and trustees was Col. John Wesley Yale, elected by N. Y. Gov. Theodore Roosevelt. In the early 1990s the Syracuse State School enrolment started dwindling, and it was shut down on June 17, 1998, with only six patients and no more being received.

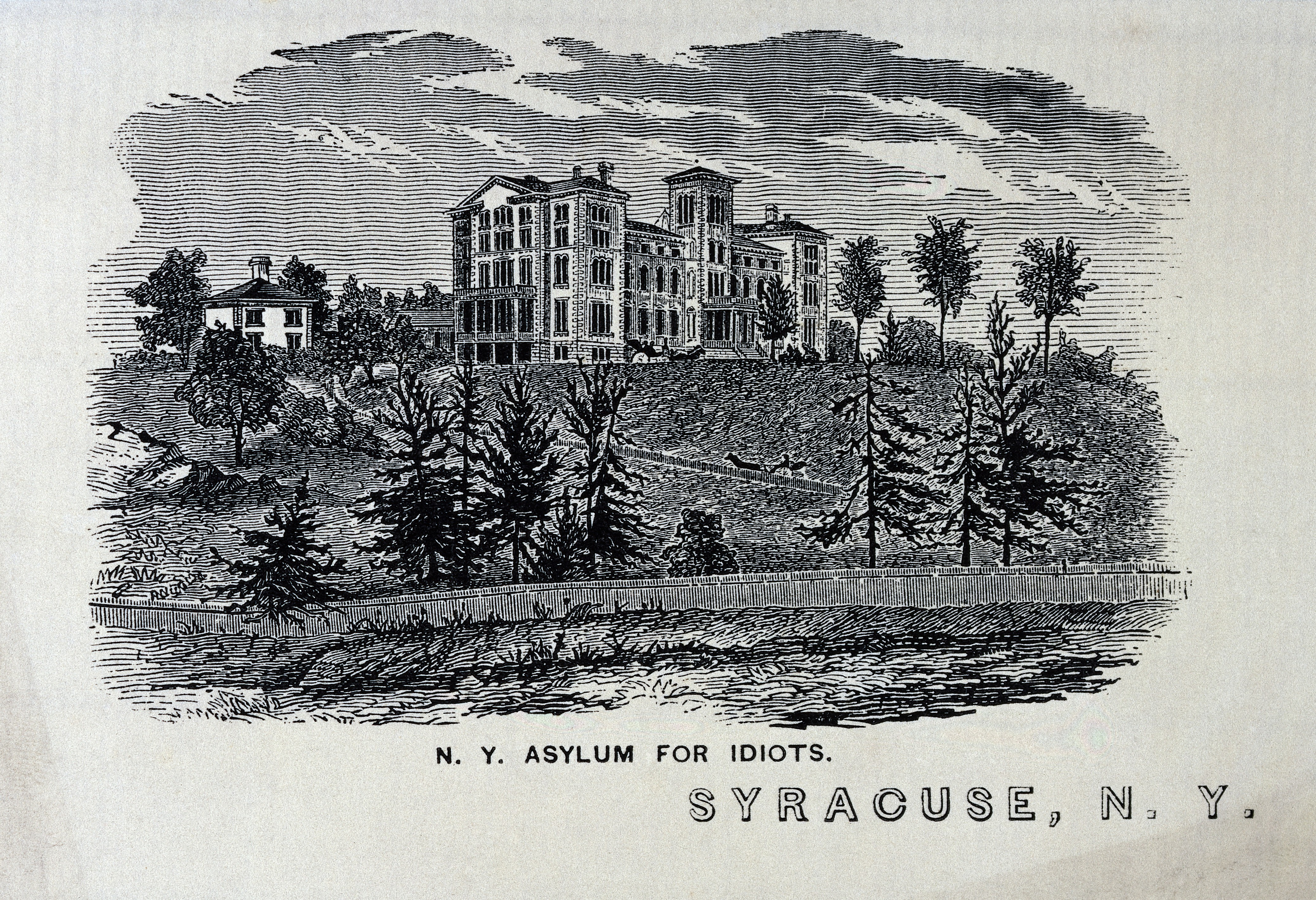
New York State Asylum for Idiots

== Redevelopment ==
Following eight years of abandonment, In October 2006 the school building was auctioned for US$2.2 million to Syracuse Resort Development (SRD), a group of investors on Long Island, which intended to make it a vacation resort. But the state Empire State Development Corporation soon expressed worry that the purchase of the property was fraudulent. One of the investors, Moussa Yeroushalmi, had been sued by the U.S. Securities and Exchange Commission in 2004 over allegations that he defrauded investors. The worries soon came true. SRD paid no taxes on the property and continuously contested the 585,000 square-foot building's tax assessment. Proposals by SRD, such as a resort for disabled people and a "green" business park, never materialized.

Syracuse Resort, an affiliate of SRD and a minority owner of the former developmental center, filed for bankruptcy in December 2010. SRD, which owned 92.5% of the property, followed suit in April 2011. Both actions were filed to prevent the city from seizing the property for back taxes.

The property was sold for $2.1 million in a bankruptcy auction to a "Syracuse Center LLC" in 2013. It has not paid any property taxes since January 2016, according to the city Department of Finance. This company was once thought to be a portion of a Jewish trade school based in California, but is owned by a company that Kazakhstan officials allege to be a shell corporation formed to hide tens of millions of dollars in stolen money according to local media syracuse.com.

== Sources ==
- James Thornton Correspondence finding aid
- New York State Asylum for Idiots at rootsweb.com
- "A Short History of Selected Hospitals in Syracuse". Upstate Medical University Health Sciences Library, Historical Collections. Archived from the original on February 24, 2012.
- "Syracuse State School". Abandoned Online. February 27, 2019.
- New York, Legislature, Assembly, New York State Legislature Assembly. Documents of the Assembly of the State of New York. 1888. Vol. 6.
- Four years later, former Syracuse Developmental Center may get another chance to develop
- Syracuse Developmental Center Assorted Estrayed Institutional Records
- The massive Developmental Center on Syracuse’s West Side is up for sale
- Meet the ex-con who ties himself to Trump
