= Fred Smith (1890s pitcher) =

American baseball player (1865–1926)

- Pitcher/Outfielder
- Born: May 1865; Baltimore, Maryland, U.S.
- Died: November 19, 1926 (aged 61); Chicago, Illinois, U.S.
- Batted: Left Threw: Right

MLB debut
- April 18, 1890, for the Toledo Maumees

Last MLB appearance
- October 12, 1890, for the Toledo Maumees

MLB statistics
- Win–loss record: 19–13
- Strikeouts: 116
- ERA: 3.27
- Innings pitched: 286.0
- Stats at Baseball Reference

Teams
- Toledo Maumees (1890)

Frederick Christopher Smith (May, 1865 – November 19, 1926) was an American pitcher and outfielder in Major League Baseball who played for the Toledo Maumees of the American Association in 1890. Listed at 5' 11", 156 lb., Smith pitched left handed and threw right handed. He was born in Baltimore, Maryland.

In his only major league season, Smith started 34 games for the Maumees, relieved in one, and was the second winningest pitcher on the team with his 19–13 record. He hurled two shutouts and had an earned run average of 3.27, which was better than the league's average. He also was one of the league's better fielding pitchers, as he only made five errors in 35 games at the position.

As a hitter, he went 21-for-126 for a .167 batting average, including seven doubles, one triple, 11 runs and 10 RBI in 38 games.

Smith died in Chicago, Illinois, at the age of 61.
