= Dan Long (baseball) =

American baseball player (1867–1929)

- Outfielder
- Born: August 27, 1867; Boston, Massachusetts, U.S.
- Died: April 30, 1929 (aged 61); Sausalito, California, U.S.
- Batted: Unknown Threw: Unknown

MLB debut
- August 27, 1890, for the Baltimore Orioles

Last MLB appearance
- October 15, 1890, for the Baltimore Orioles

MLB statistics
- Batting average: .156
- Hits: 12
- Runs: 19
- Stats at Baseball Reference

Teams
- Baltimore Orioles (1890)

Daniel W. Long (August 27, 1867 – April 30, 1929) was an American baseball player. He was an outfielder in Major League Baseball and played for the Baltimore Orioles of the American Association in 21 games in 1890. He was born in Boston, Massachusetts.
