= Ed Mars =

American baseball player (1866–1941)

- Pitcher
- Born: December 4, 1866; Chicago, Illinois
- Died: December 9, 1941 (aged 75); Chicago, Illinois
- Batted: Unknown Threw: Unknown

MLB debut
- August 12, 1890, for the Syracuse Stars

Last MLB appearance
- October 12, 1890, for the Syracuse Stars

MLB statistics
- Win–loss record: 9-5
- Earned run average: 4.67
- Strikeouts: 59
- Stats at Baseball Reference

Teams
- Syracuse Stars (1890)

Edward M. Mars (December 4, 1866 – December 9, 1941) was an American Major League Baseball player. He was a starting pitcher for the Syracuse Stars of the American Association for the last two months of the 1890 season.

Mars led the 55–72 Stars in winning percentage (.643) with a 9–5 record. That achievement was also for fourth-best in the entire league. He had a rather high earned run average of 4.67 but an average run support. In his 14 starts the Stars scored 111 runs, an average of almost 8 runs per game. By contrast, they averaged just 5.2 runs in the 113 games that he didn't start.

He helped himself with his bat and his glove, as well. He was 14-for-51 (.275) at the plate, with 9 runs batted in and 9 runs scored. He was also one of the league's better fielding pitchers, as he made only 2 errors in his 16 total appearances.

Mars died in his hometown of Chicago, Illinois at the age of 75.
