= Pete Gilbert (baseball) =

American baseball player (1867–1911)

- Third baseman
- Born: September 6, 1867; Baltic, Connecticut
- Died: January 1, 1911 (aged 43); Springfield, Massachusetts
- Batted: Unknown Threw: Right

MLB debut
- September 6, 1890, for the Baltimore Orioles

Last MLB appearance
- September 30, 1894, for the Louisville Colonels

MLB statistics
- Batting average: .242
- Hits: 184
- Runs: 120

Teams
- Baltimore Orioles (1890–1892); Brooklyn Grooms (1894); Louisville Colonels (1894)

Peter Gilbert (September 6, 1867 – January 1, 1911) was a third baseman in Major League Baseball who played from 1890 to 1894.
