= Joe McGuckin =

American baseball player (1862–1903)

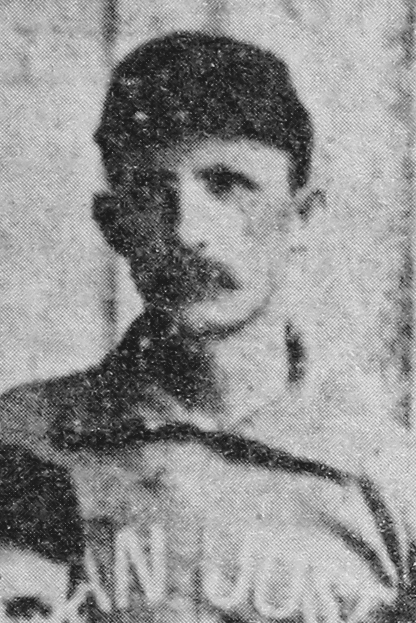
- Outfielder
- Born: March 13, 1862; Paterson, New Jersey, U.S.
- Died: December 31, 1903 (aged 41); Yonkers, New York, U.S.
- Batted: Unknown Threw: Unknown

MLB debut
- August 27, 1890, for the Baltimore Orioles

Last MLB appearance
- September 8, 1890, for the Baltimore Orioles

MLB statistics
- Batting average: .108
- Hits: 4
- Runs: 2
- Stats at Baseball Reference

Teams
- Baltimore Orioles (1890)

Joseph W. McGuckin (March 13, 1862 – December 31, 1903) was an American outfielder in Major League Baseball who played for the Baltimore Orioles of the American Association in 11 games in 1890. He played in the minors through 1901.
