= Speranza Park =

Former baseball ground in Toledo, Ohio

- Interactive map of Speranza Park
- Location: Toledo, Ohio, United States
- Coordinates: 41°40′8″N 83°32′38″W
- Surface: Natural grass

Tenant
- Toledo Maumees (TSL / IA / AA) (1888–1890)

Speranza Park is a former baseball ground located in Toledo, Ohio, United States. The ground was home to the Toledo Maumees of the American Association during the 1890 season.

The ballpark was located on a block bounded by Cherry Street, Frederick Street, and Franklin Avenue.

The word "speranza" means "hope" in Italian. The park was reportedly named for the club owner's yacht. The team's first home game was played on May 1, 1890. The team finished a few games above .500, and 20 games back of first place, ending whatever major league hopes the club aspired to. The final home game was held on October 2, 1890.

== Sources ==
- The Toledo Baseball Guide of the Mud Hens 1883-1943, Ralph Elliott Lin Weber, 1944.
- Ballparks of North America, Michael Benson, McFarland, 1989.
