= Cupid Childs =

American baseball player (1867–1912)

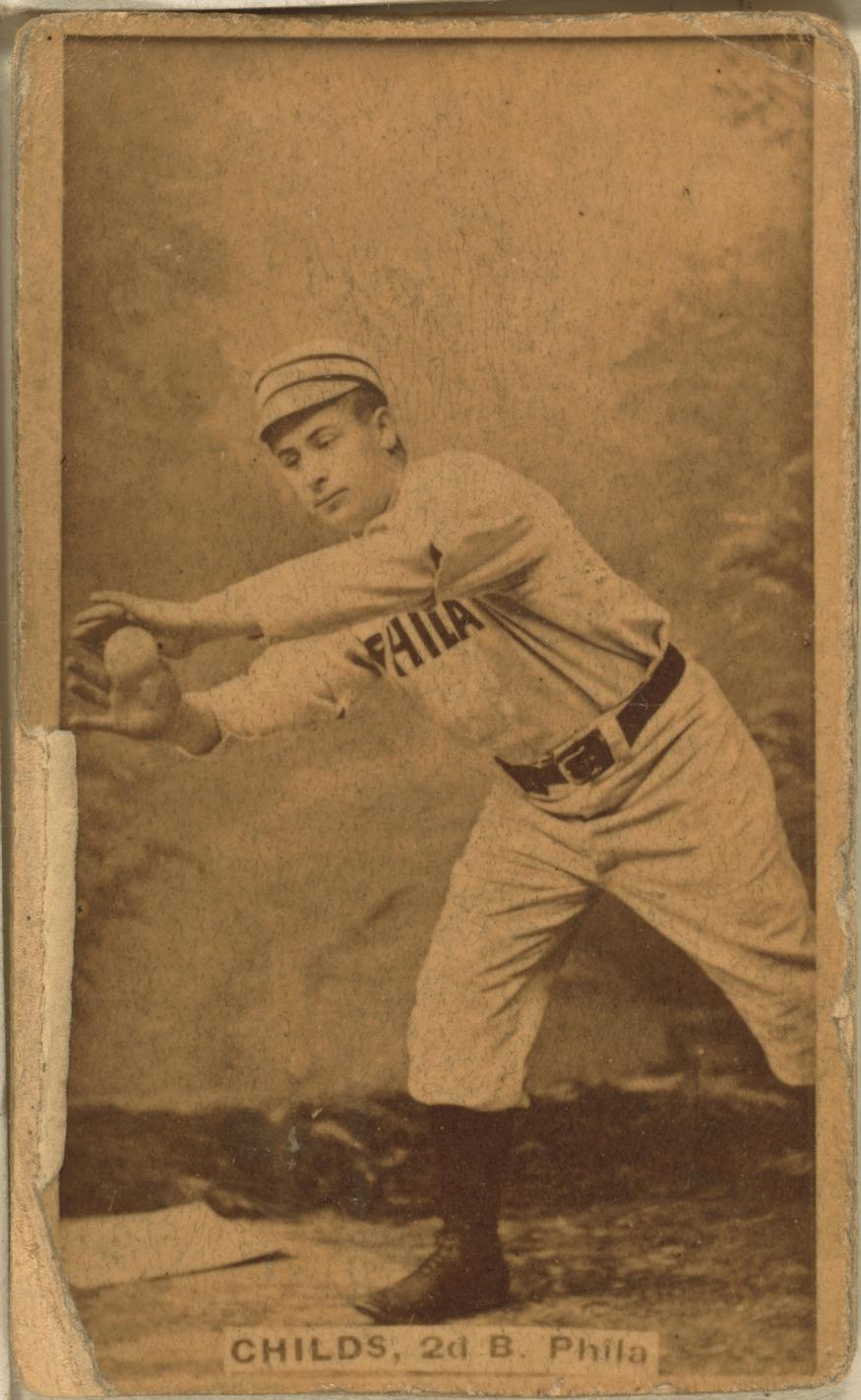
- Childs on a Goodwin & Company card, c. 1887-90
- Second baseman
- Born: August 8, 1867; Calvert County, Maryland, U.S.
- Died: November 8, 1912 (aged 45); Baltimore, Maryland, U.S.
- Batted: Left Threw: Right

MLB debut
- April 23, 1888, for the Philadelphia Quakers

Last MLB appearance
- September 26, 1901, for the Chicago Orphans

MLB statistics
- Batting average: .306
- Home runs: 20
- Runs batted in: 743
- Stats at Baseball Reference

Teams
- Philadelphia Quakers (1888); Syracuse Stars (1890); Cleveland Spiders (1891–1898); St. Louis Perfectos (1899); Chicago Orphans (1900–1901)

Clarence Lemuel "Cupid" Childs (August 8, 1867 – November 8, 1912) was an American second baseman in Major League Baseball with a 13-season career from 1888, 1890–1901, playing for the Philadelphia Quakers, Cleveland Spiders, St. Louis Perfectos and Chicago Orphans of the National League and the Syracuse Stars of the American Association.

== Early life ==
Childs was born in Calvert County, Maryland. During his career, much was apparently made of Childs' pudgy appearance. Standing 5'8" tall, he weighed 185 pounds. This led to the nickname of "Cupid", as he was said to resemble a cherub.

== Career ==
Childs led the league in runs (136) in 1892 with the Cleveland Spiders. The 1892 Spiders featured several stars, including future Hall of Fame members Cy Young, George Davis and Jesse Burkett. The team went to the league championship series, where they lost to the Boston Beaneaters. They had similar success in 1895, when they finished second in the league and played in the Temple Cup.

Childs was among the top ten players in the league in walks every season between 1890 and 1900; he finished second in walks every season between 1891 and 1894. He led the league in doubles and extra base hits in 1890. In May 1900, Childs was attempting a double play against the Pittsburgh Pirates when the Pirates player-manager Fred Clarke slid into him. There was a brief confrontation on the field, and then Childs spotted Clarke at a train station after the game. Childs charged Clarke and badly beat the manager in the ensuing fistfight. The next day, fans in Pittsburgh showed up in large numbers (triple the average Monday attendance) hoping to see a continuation of the scuffle, but the game was played without incident.

Childs' playing time fell off in his final season of 1901 (63 games, from 137 the previous year) as Pete Childs (no known relationship) played more of the team's games at second base. A career .306 hitter, Childs retired with a .416 on-base percentage, 991 walks and 269 stolen bases, having played more than 1400 games as a second baseman.

== Later life ==
By the time he was 45, Childs was living in Baltimore, Maryland, and he had developed cirrhosis and nephritis (known as Bright's disease at the time). He died in Baltimore on November 8, 1912. He was buried there at Loudon Park Cemetery.

== See also ==
- List of Major League Baseball career triples leaders
- List of Major League Baseball career runs scored leaders
- List of Major League Baseball career stolen bases leaders
- List of Major League Baseball annual runs scored leaders
- List of Major League Baseball annual doubles leaders
