= Bill Higgins (baseball) =

American baseball player (1859–1919)

- Second baseman
- Born: December 4, 1859; Camden, Delaware, U.S.
- Died: April 25, 1919 (aged 59); Farnhurst, Delaware, U.S.
- Batted: Unknown Threw: Right

MLB debut
- August 9, 1888, for the Boston Beaneaters

Last MLB appearance
- October 2, 1890, for the Syracuse Stars

MLB statistics
- Batting average: .241
- Home runs: 0
- Runs batted in: 40
- Stats at Baseball Reference

Teams
- Boston Beaneaters (1888); St. Louis Browns (1890); Syracuse Stars (1890)

William Edward Higgins (December 4, 1859 – April 25, 1919) was an American professional baseball player. He played two seasons in Major League Baseball, with the Boston Beaneaters of the National League in 1888, and the St. Louis Browns and Syracuse Stars of the American Association in 1890, primarily as a second baseman. He was playing in the minor leagues as late as 1896.
