= Toledo Maumees =

American baseball team

Information
- League: American Association (1890)
- Location: Toledo, Ohio
- Ballpark: Speranza Park (1888–1890)
- Established: 1888
- Folded: 1890
- Former league(s): International Association (1889); Tri-State League (1888)
- Ownership: Henry Killilea (1894–1901)
- Manager: Charlie Morton (1889–1890)

The Toledo Maumees were a baseball team originally formed in 1888. The team was based in Toledo, Ohio, and formed part of the Tri-State League for one season. Their home games were played at Speranza Park in Toledo.

In 1889, the Maumees moved to the International Association, where they were also known as the Toledo Black Pirates. Managed by former player Charlie Morton, the team finished in fourth place with a 54–51 record. Toledo first baseman Perry Werden won the batting title with a .394 average while leading the league in hits (167).

In 1890 the team joined the American Association. Again, with Morton at the helm, the Maumees won 68 games, lost 64, and finished fourth in the nine-team league. Their top hitters were right fielder Ed Swartwood, who batted .327 with a slugging percentage of .444, and first sacker Werden, who had a .295 batting average and slugged .456. Egyptian Healy (22–21, 2.89) and Fred Smith (19–13, 3.27) led the pitching staff. At the end of the 1890 season, the team folded.

The team has no relationship to the Toledo Black Pirates of 1892, a club member of the original Western League which was based in the city. Led by manager Ed MacGregor, the Black Pirates went 28–29 to finish fourth among the teams that did not fold during the season (the league itself folded on July 11).

== See also ==
- 1890 Toledo Maumees season

== Sources ==
- Encyclopedia of Minor League Baseball – Lloyd Johnson, Miles Wolff. Publisher: Baseball America, 1993. Language: English. Format: Paperback, 420pp. ISBN 0-9637189-1-6
