= Syracuse Stars (American Association) =

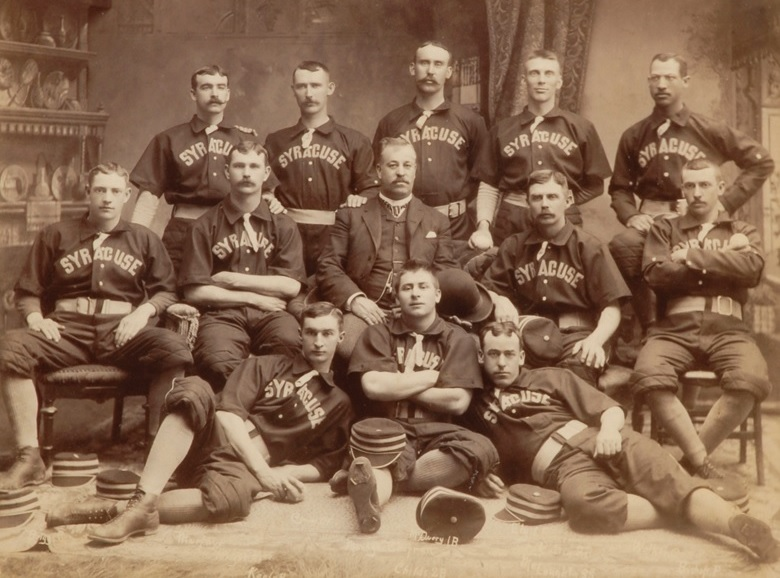
- Logo Syracuse Stars of 1889. Manager Jack Chapman is at the center, while Moses "Fleet" Walker is at the upper-right.

Information
- League: American Association (1890)
- Location: Syracuse, New York
- Ballpark: Star Park (1885–1890)
- Established: 1885
- Folded: 1890
- International Association pennants: 1 (1888)
- Former leagues: Minor league: International Association (1888–1889); International League (1886–1887); New York State League (1885)
- Colors: Purple, white
- Ownership: George Frazier (1890)
- Manager: List of managers: George Frazier & Wallace Fessenden (1890); Jack Chapman (1889); Charles Hackett (1888); James Gifford (1886–1887); Frank Olin (1886); Henry Ormsbee (1885–1886); John Humphries (1885)

The Syracuse Stars were an American baseball team which played one season in the American Association in 1890. They were unrelated to the Syracuse Stars of the National League of 1879. They were based in Syracuse, New York, and played their games at Star Park.

== Starting out in the minor leagues ==
Established in 1885 as members of the New York State League, the Stars played in the original International League in 1886 and 1887. When that league collapsed, the Stars were among several teams to join the re-formed International Association, where they played in 1888 and 1889, winning the league in 1888.

== Moving up to the majors ==
The Stars joined the American Association for the 1890 season. The Stars of 1890 won 55 games and lost 72 to finish seventh in the nine-team league. They were managed for most of the season by owner George Frazier. Wallace Fessenden took over as manager for the last eleven games.

The Stars' top hitter was second baseman Cupid Childs, who led the team in games played (126), hits (170), doubles (33), triples (14), runs (109), runs batted in (89), batting average (.345), on-base percentage (.434), slugging percentage (.481), and stolen bases (56). Their best pitcher was Dan Casey, who was 19-22 with a 4.14 ERA. Ed Mars was 9-5 to lead the team in winning percentage (.643) even though he had a higher ERA (4.67).

The Stars folded after the 1890 season during which owner Frazier lost an estimated $21,000 on the team.

== See also ==
- Syracuse Stars (minor league baseball)
- 1890 Syracuse Stars season
