= 1890 Cleveland Infants season =

1890 Cleveland Infants
- League: Players' League
- Ballpark: Brotherhood Park
- City: Cleveland, Ohio
- Record: 55–75 (.423)
- League place: 7th
- Owner: Al Johnson
- Manager: Henry Larkin, Patsy Tebeau

The 1890 Cleveland Infants baseball team was a member of the short-lived Players' League. They compiled a 55–75 record, finishing in seventh place. After the season, both the Infants and the league folded.

== Regular season ==
=== Season standings ===
Players' League
| Team | W | L | Pct. | GB | Home | Road |
|---|---|---|---|---|---|---|
| Boston Reds | 81 | 48 | .628 | — | 48‍–‍21 | 33‍–‍27 |
| Brooklyn Ward's Wonders | 76 | 56 | .576 | 6½ | 46‍–‍19 | 30‍–‍37 |
| New York Giants | 74 | 57 | .565 | 8 | 47‍–‍19 | 27‍–‍38 |
| Chicago Pirates | 75 | 62 | .547 | 10 | 46‍–‍23 | 29‍–‍39 |
| Philadelphia Athletics | 68 | 63 | .519 | 14 | 35‍–‍30 | 33‍–‍33 |
| Pittsburgh Burghers | 60 | 68 | .469 | 20½ | 37‍–‍28 | 23‍–‍40 |
| Cleveland Infants | 55 | 75 | .423 | 26½ | 31‍–‍30 | 24‍–‍45 |
| Buffalo Bisons | 36 | 96 | .273 | 46½ | 23‍–‍42 | 13‍–‍54 |

=== Record vs. opponents ===
1890 Players' League record Sources:
| Team | BSR | BKW | BUF | CPI | CLI | NYK | PHQ | PBU |
|---|---|---|---|---|---|---|---|---|
| Boston | — | 11–7 | 14–6–1 | 12–8 | 12–8 | 12–8 | 10–6 | 10–5 |
| Brooklyn | 7–11 | — | 12–6–1 | 10–9 | 12–8 | 7–10 | 14–6 | 14–6 |
| Buffalo | 6–14–1 | 6–12–1 | — | 5–15 | 7–9 | 3–17 | 4–16 | 5–13 |
| Chicago | 8–12 | 9–10 | 15–5 | — | 13–7 | 9–9–1 | 10–10 | 11–9 |
| Cleveland | 8–12 | 8–12 | 9–7 | 7–13 | — | 8–11 | 8–11–1 | 7–9 |
| New York | 8–12 | 10–7 | 17–3 | 9–9–1 | 11–8 | — | 5–12 | 14–6 |
| Philadelphia | 6–10 | 6–14 | 16–4 | 10–10 | 11–8–1 | 12–5 | — | 7–12 |
| Pittsburgh | 5–10 | 6–14 | 13–5 | 9–11 | 9–7 | 6–14 | 12–7 | — |

=== Roster ===
1890 Cleveland Infants
Roster
| Pitchers: Jersey Bakely; Charlie Dewald; Bill Gleason; Henry Gruber; George Hemming; Willie McGill; Cinders O'Brien | Catchers: Jack Brennan; Pop Snyder; Neil Stynes; Sy Sutcliffe; Infielders: Ed Delahanty; Henry Larkin; Cub Stricker; Patsy Tebeau | Outfielders: Jay Budd; Pete Browning; Jack Carney; Jimmy McAleer; Paul Radford; Larry Twitchell | Manager: Henry Larkin; Patsy Tebeau |

== Player stats ==
=== Batting ===
==== Starters by position ====
Note: Pos = Position; G = Games played; AB = At bats; H = Hits; Avg. = Batting average; HR = Home runs; RBI = Runs batted in

| Pos | Player | G | AB | H | Avg. | HR | RBI |
|---|---|---|---|---|---|---|---|
| C | Sy Sutcliffe | 99 | 386 | 127 | .329 | 2 | 60 |
| 1B | Henry Larkin | 125 | 506 | 167 | .330 | 5 | 112 |
| 2B | Cub Stricker | 127 | 544 | 133 | .244 | 2 | 65 |
| SS | Ed Delahanty | 115 | 517 | 153 | .296 | 3 | 64 |
| 3B | Patsy Tebeau | 110 | 450 | 134 | .298 | 5 | 74 |
| OF | Jimmy McAleer | 86 | 341 | 91 | .267 | 1 | 42 |
| OF | Paul Radford | 122 | 466 | 136 | .292 | 2 | 62 |
| OF | Pete Browning | 118 | 493 | 184 | .373 | 5 | 93 |

==== Other batters ====
Note: G = Games played; AB = At bats; H = Hits; Avg. = Batting average; HR = Home runs; RBI = Runs batted in

| Player | G | AB | H | Avg. | HR | RBI |
|---|---|---|---|---|---|---|
| Jack Brennan | 59 | 233 | 59 | .253 | 0 | 26 |
| Larry Twitchell | 56 | 233 | 52 | .223 | 2 | 36 |
| Jack Carney | 25 | 89 | 31 | .348 | 0 | 21 |
| Pop Snyder | 13 | 48 | 9 | .188 | 0 | 12 |
| Neil Stynes | 2 | 8 | 0 | .000 | 0 | 0 |
| Jay Budd | 1 | 4 | 0 | .000 | 0 | 0 |

=== Pitching ===
==== Starting pitchers ====
Note: G = Games pitched; IP = Innings pitched; W = Wins; L = Losses; ERA = Earned run average; SO = Strikeouts

| Player | G | IP | W | L | ERA | SO |
|---|---|---|---|---|---|---|
| Henry Gruber | 48 | 383.1 | 22 | 23 | 4.27 | 110 |
| Jersey Bakely | 43 | 326.1 | 12 | 25 | 4.47 | 67 |
| Cinders O'Brien | 25 | 206.1 | 8 | 16 | 3.40 | 54 |
| Willie McGill | 24 | 183.2 | 11 | 9 | 4.12 | 82 |
| Charlie Dewald | 2 | 14.0 | 2 | 0 | 0.64 | 6 |
| Bill Gleason | 1 | 4.0 | 0 | 1 | 27.00 | 0 |

==== Other pitchers ====
Note: G = Games pitched; IP = Innings pitched; W = Wins; L = Losses; ERA = Earned run average; SO = Strikeouts

| Player | G | IP | W | L | ERA | SO |
|---|---|---|---|---|---|---|
| George Hemming | 3 | 21.0 | 0 | 1 | 6.86 | 3 |

==== Relief pitchers ====
Note: G = Games pitched; W = Wins; L = Losses; SV = Saves; ERA = Earned run average; SO = Strikeouts

| Player | G | W | L | SV | ERA | SO |
|---|---|---|---|---|---|---|
| Paul Radford | 1 | 0 | 0 | 0 | 3.60 | 3 |
