= List of Major League Baseball single-game hits leaders =

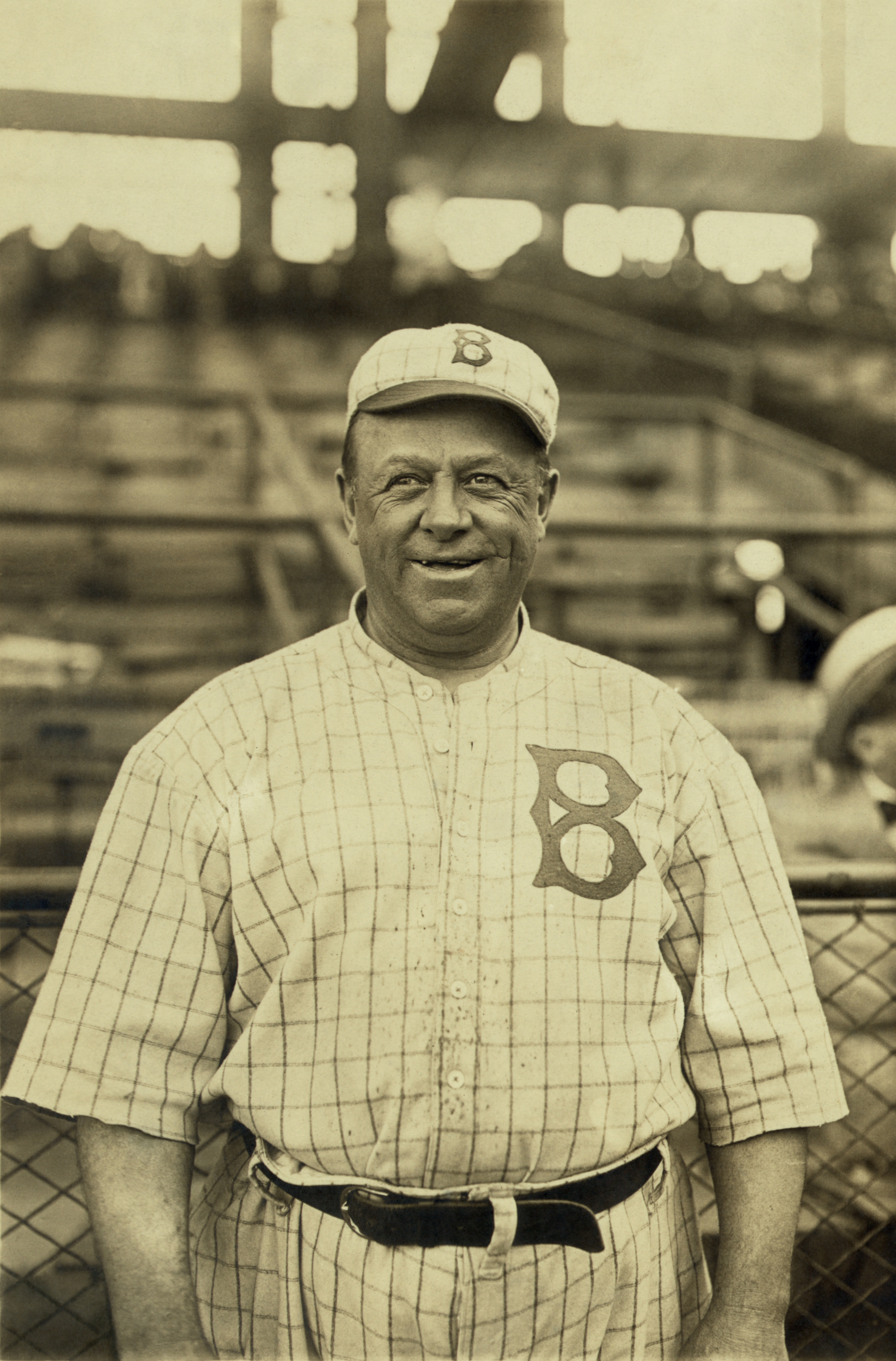
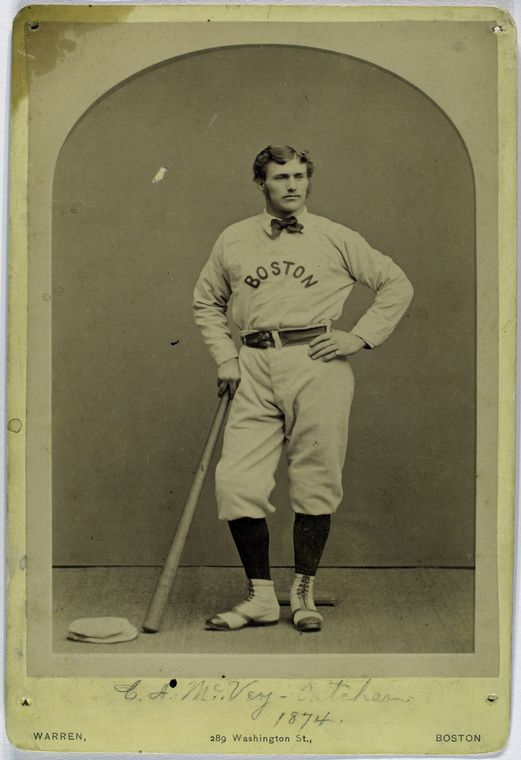
Wilbert Robinson (left) and Rennie Stennett (not pictured) hold the record for most hits in a nine-inning game with seven, while Cal McVey (right) amassed six hits in each of two consecutive games.

In baseball, a hit is credited to a batter when he reaches first base – or any subsequent base – safely after hitting a fair ball, without the benefit of an error or a fielder's choice. One hundred nineteen different players have recorded at least six hits in a single nine-inning Major League Baseball game. Five players have accomplished the feat more than once in their career; no player has ever recorded more than seven hits in a nine-inning game. Davy Force was the first player to collect six hits in a single game, doing so for the Philadelphia Athletics against the Chicago White Stockings on June 27, 1876.

These games have resulted in other single-game MLB records being set in connection with the prodigious offensive performance. Shawn Green, for example, established a new major league record with 19 total bases and finished with a total of five extra-base hits, tying a National League record that was also achieved by Larry Twitchell during the latter's six-hit game. Four of Green's six hits were home runs, equaling the record for most home runs in one game. Jim Bottomley, Walker Cooper, Anthony Rendon, and Wilbert Robinson hit 10 or more runs batted in (RBI) to complement their six hits. Robinson proceeded to collect a seventh hit and an eleventh RBI to set single-game records in both categories. Although his record of 11 RBIs has since been broken, Robinson's seven hits in a nine-inning game has been matched only by Rennie Stennett.

Guy Hecker, the only pitcher to have accomplished the feat, also broke the single-game major league record for runs scored with seven. Cal McVey is the sole player to collect six hits in each of two consecutive games. Seven players hit for the cycle during their six-hit game. Zaza Harvey has the fewest career hits among players who have six hits in one game with 86, while Ty Cobb – with 4,189 (Note: Baseball-Reference.com, the Hall of Fame, and the Society for American Baseball Research all credit Cobb with 4,189 hits, while MLB.com lists 4,191.) – had more hits than any other player in this group and amassed the second most in major league history. Cobb, Cal Ripken Jr., and Paul Waner are also members of the 3,000 hit club.

Of the 75 players eligible for the Baseball Hall of Fame who have recorded six hits in a nine-inning game, eighteen have been elected, three on the first ballot. Players are eligible for the Hall of Fame if they have played in at least 10 MLB seasons, and have either been retired for five seasons or deceased for at least six months. These requirements leave six players ineligible who are active, six players ineligible who are living and have played in the past five seasons, and twenty-six players ineligible who did not play in 10 seasons.

== Players ==
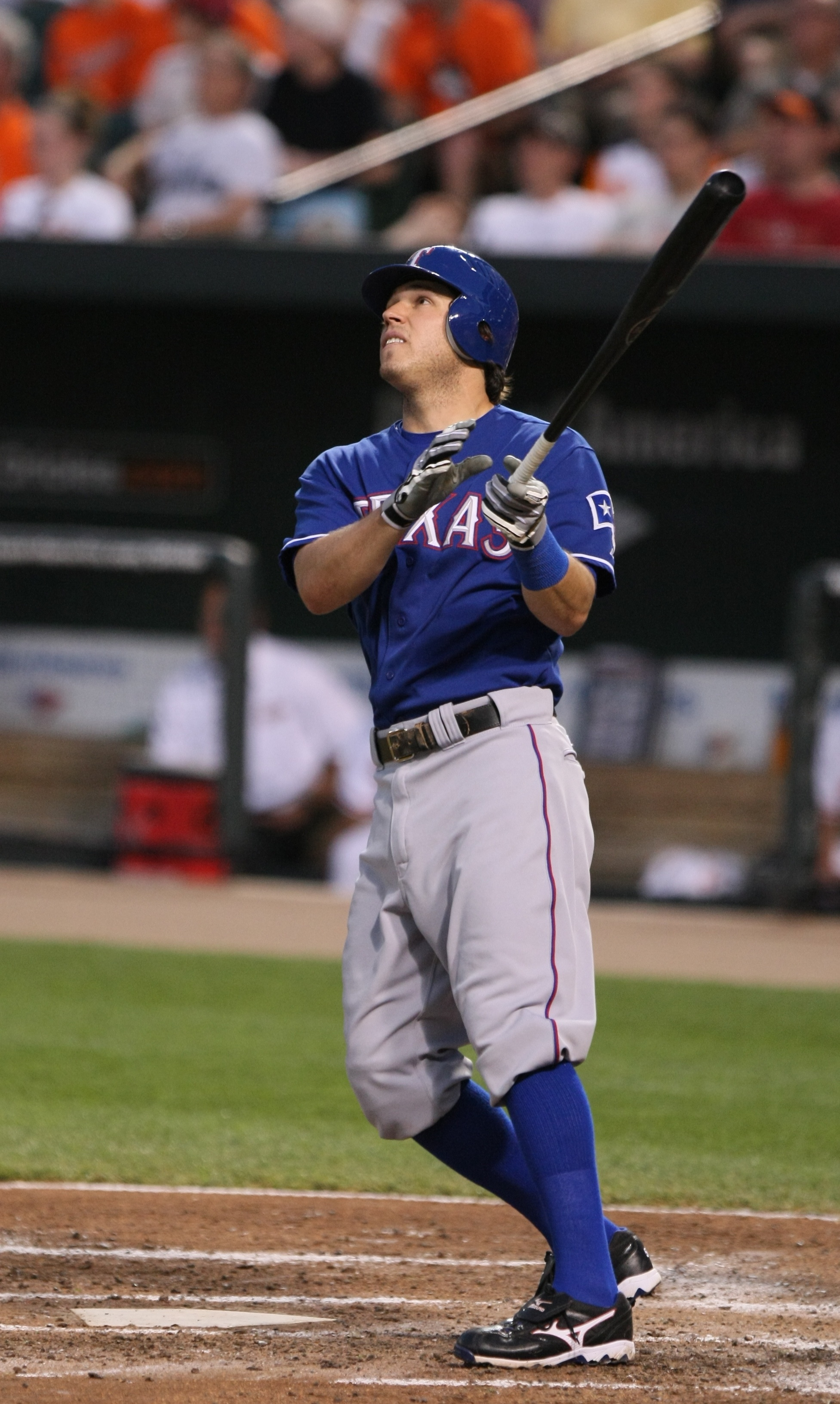
Ian Kinsler is one of seven players to record six hits and hit for the cycle in the same game.

Key
Player (X)	Name of the player and number of six hit games they had at that point
Date	Date of the game
Team	The player's team at the time of the game
Lge.	The league the player's team is a member of
NL	National League
AL	American League
AA	American Association
PL	Players' League
Opposing team	The team against whom the player had six hits
AB	Number of times at bat the player was credited with
Hits	Number of hits the player was credited with
2B	Number of hits that were doubles
3B	Number of hits that were triples
HR	Number of hits that were home runs
Career hits	The number of hits the player had in his MLB career
Box	Box score with play by play (if available)
^	Indicates the player hit for the cycle
†	Elected to the Baseball Hall of Fame
‡	Player is active

MLB hitters with six hits in a nine-inning game
Player	Date	Team	Lge.	Opposing team	AB	Hits	2B	3B	HR	Career hits	Box	Ref
Davy Force	June 27, 1876	Philadelphia Athletics	NL	Chicago White Stockings	6	6	1	0	0	1,059	—N/a	
Cal McVey	July 22, 1876	Chicago White Stockings	NL	Louisville Grays	7	6	1	0	0	869	—N/a	
Cal McVey (2)	July 25, 1876	Chicago White Stockings	NL	Cincinnati Reds	7	6	1	0	0	869	—N/a	
Ross Barnes	July 27, 1876	Chicago White Stockings	NL	Cincinnati Reds	6	6	1	1	0	860	—N/a	
George Gore	May 7, 1880	Chicago White Stockings	NL	Cincinnati Reds	6	6	0	0	0	1,612	—N/a	
Buttercup Dickerson	June 16, 1881	Worcester Ruby Legs	NL	Buffalo Bisons	6	6	0	1	0	500	—N/a	
Sam Wise	June 20, 1883	Boston Beaneaters	NL	Philadelphia Quakers	7	6	1	1	0	1,281	—N/a	
Dan Brouthers^{†}	July 19, 1883	Buffalo Bisons	NL	Philadelphia Quakers	6	6	2	0	0	2,296	—N/a	
Hick Carpenter	September 12, 1883	Cincinnati Red Stockings	AA	Pittsburgh Alleghenys	7	6	0	0	0	1,202	—N/a	
John Reilly	September 12, 1883	Cincinnati Red Stockings	AA	Pittsburgh Alleghenys	7	6^{^}	1^{^}	1^{^}	1^{^}	1,352	—N/a	
Oscar Walker	May 31, 1884	Brooklyn Atlantics	AA	St. Louis Browns	6	6	1	1	0	287	—N/a	
Lon Knight	July 30, 1884	Philadelphia Athletics	AA	Washington Nationals	6	6	0	1	0	555	—N/a	
Dave Orr	June 12, 1885	New York Metropolitans	AA	St. Louis Browns	6	6^{^}	2^{^}	1^{^}	1^{^}	1,125	—N/a	
Henry Larkin	June 16, 1885	Philadelphia Athletics	AA	Pittsburgh Alleghenys	6	6^{^}	2^{^}	1^{^}	1^{^}	1,429	—N/a	
George Pinkney	June 25, 1885	Brooklyn Grays	AA	Philadelphia Athletics	6	6	0	0	0	1,212	—N/a	
Arlie Latham	April 24, 1886	St. Louis Browns	AA	Louisville Colonels	6	6	0	1	0	1,836	—N/a	
Guy Hecker	August 15, 1886	Louisville Colonels	AA	Baltimore Orioles	7	6	0	0	3	812	—N/a	
Denny Lyons	April 26, 1887	Philadelphia Athletics	AA	New York Metropolitans	6	6	2	1	0	1,334	—N/a	
Reddy Mack	May 26, 1887	Louisville Colonels	AA	Brooklyn Grays	6	6	0	0	0	524	—N/a	
Danny Richardson	June 11, 1887	New York Giants	NL	Washington Nationals	7	6	0	0	0	1,129	—N/a	
King Kelly^{†}	August 27, 1887	Boston Beaneaters	NL	Pittsburgh Alleghenys	7	6	1	0	1	1,813	—N/a	
Pete Hotaling	June 6, 1888	Cleveland Blues	AA	Louisville Colonels	7	6	0	1	0	931	—N/a	
Jim McTamany	June 15, 1888	Kansas City Cowboys	AA	Cincinnati Red Stockings	6	6	0	0	1	794	—N/a	
Jerry Denny	May 4, 1889	Indianapolis Hoosiers	NL	Pittsburgh Alleghenys	6	6	1	0	1	1,286	—N/a	
Darby O'Brien	August 8, 1889	Brooklyn Bridegrooms	AA	Columbus Solons	6	6	3	0	0	805	—N/a	
Larry Twitchell	August 15, 1889	Cleveland Spiders	NL	Boston Beaneaters	6	6^{^}	1^{^}	3^{^}	1^{^}	676	—N/a	
Ed Delahanty^{†}	June 2, 1890	Cleveland Infants	PL	Chicago Pirates	6	6	1	1	0	2,597	—N/a	
Farmer Weaver	August 12, 1890	Louisville Colonels	AA	Syracuse Stars	6	6^{^}	1^{^}	2^{^}	1^{^}	853	—N/a	
Billy Shindle	August 26, 1890	Philadelphia Athletics	PL	Cleveland Infants	6	6	2	1	0	1,564	—N/a	
Jack Glasscock	September 27, 1890	New York Giants	NL	Cincinnati Reds	6	6	0	0	0	2,041	—N/a	
Frank Scheibeck	September 27, 1890	Toledo Maumees	AA	Philadelphia Athletics	6	6	1	1	0	329	—N/a	
Bobby Lowe	June 11, 1891	Boston Beaneaters	NL	Chicago Colts	6	6	1	0	1	1,934	—N/a	
Henry Larkin (2)	June 7, 1892	Washington Senators	NL	Cincinnati Reds	7	6	0	1	0	1,429	—N/a	
Wilbert Robinson^{†}	June 10, 1892	Baltimore Orioles	NL	St. Louis Browns	7	7	1	0	0	1,388	—N/a	
Duff Cooley	September 30, 1893	St. Louis Browns	NL	Boston Beaneaters	6	6	1	1	0	1,579	—N/a	
Ed Delahanty^{†} (2)	June 16, 1894	Philadelphia Phillies	NL	Cincinnati Reds	6	6	1	0	0	2,597	—N/a	
Steve Brodie	July 9, 1894	Baltimore Orioles	NL	Pittsburgh Pirates	6	6	2	1	0	1,728	—N/a	
Sam Thompson^{†}	August 17, 1894	Philadelphia Phillies	NL	Louisville Colonels	7	6^{^}	1^{^}	1^{^}	1^{^}	1,988	—N/a	
Roger Connor^{†}	June 1, 1895	St. Louis Browns	NL	New York Giants	6	6	2	1	0	2,467	—N/a	
George Davis^{†}	August 15, 1895	New York Giants	NL	Philadelphia Phillies	6	6	2	1	0	2,665	—N/a	
Jake Stenzel	May 14, 1896	Pittsburgh Pirates	NL	Boston Beaneaters	6	6	0	0	0	1,024	—N/a	
Fred Tenney	May 31, 1897	Boston Beaneaters	NL	St. Louis Browns	8	6	1	0	0	2,231	—N/a	
Barry McCormick	June 29, 1897	Chicago Colts	NL	Louisville Colonels	8	6	0	1	1	867	—N/a	
Tommy Tucker	July 15, 1897	Washington Senators	NL	Cincinnati Reds	6	6	1	0	0	1,882	—N/a	
Willie Keeler^{†}	September 3, 1897	Baltimore Orioles	NL	St. Louis Browns	6	6	0	1	0	2,932	—N/a	
Jack Doyle	September 3, 1897	Baltimore Orioles	NL	St. Louis Browns	6	6	2	0	0	1,811	—N/a	
Chick Stahl	May 31, 1899	Boston Beaneaters	NL	Cleveland Spiders	6	6	0	0	0	1,546	—N/a	
Ginger Beaumont	July 22, 1899	Pittsburgh Pirates	NL	Philadelphia Phillies	6	6	0	0	0	1,759	—N/a	
Kip Selbach	June 9, 1901	New York Giants	NL	Cincinnati Reds	7	6	2	0	0	1,807	—N/a	
Mike Donlin	June 24, 1901	Baltimore Orioles	AL	Detroit Tigers	6	6	2	2	0	1,282	—N/a	
Kid Nance	July 13, 1901	Detroit Tigers	AL	Cleveland Bluebirds	6	6	1	0	0	182	—N/a	
Zaza Harvey	April 25, 1902	Cleveland Broncos	AL	St. Louis Browns	6	6	0	0	0	86	—N/a	
Danny Murphy	July 8, 1902	Philadelphia Athletics	AL	Boston Americans	6	6	0	0	1	1,563	—N/a	
Jimmy Williams	August 25, 1902	Baltimore Orioles	AL	Chicago White Sox	6	6	1	1	0	1,508	—N/a	
George Cutshaw	August 9, 1915	Brooklyn Robins	NL	Chicago Cubs	6	6	0	0	0	1,487		
Dave Bancroft^{†}	June 28, 1920	New York Giants	NL	Philadelphia Phillies	6	6	0	0	0	2,004		
Jack Fournier	June 29, 1923	Brooklyn Robins	NL	Philadelphia Phillies	6	6	2	0	1	1,631		
Frank Brower	August 7, 1923	Cleveland Indians	AL	Washington Senators	6	6	1	0	0	371		
George Burns	June 19, 1924	Cleveland Indians	AL	Detroit Tigers	6	6	3	1	0	2,018		
Kiki Cuyler^{†}	August 9, 1924	Pittsburgh Pirates	NL	Philadelphia Phillies	6	6	3	1	0	2,299		
Frankie Frisch^{†}	September 10, 1924	New York Giants	NL	Boston Braves	7	6	0	0	1	2,880		
Jim Bottomley^{†}	September 16, 1924	St. Louis Cardinals	NL	Brooklyn Robins	6	6	1	0	2	2,313		
Ty Cobb^{†}	May 5, 1925	Detroit Tigers	AL	St. Louis Browns	6	6	1	0	3	4,189		
Paul Waner^{†}	August 26, 1926	Pittsburgh Pirates	NL	New York Giants	6	6	2	1	0	3,152		
Wally Gilbert	May 30, 1931	Brooklyn Robins	NL	New York Giants	7	6	1	0	0	624		
Jim Bottomley^{†} (2)	August 5, 1931	St. Louis Cardinals	NL	Pittsburgh Pirates	6	6	1	0	0	2,313		
Tony Cuccinello	August 13, 1931	Cincinnati Reds	NL	Boston Braves	6	6	2	1	0	1,729		
Doc Cramer	June 20, 1932	Philadelphia Athletics	AL	Chicago White Sox	6	6	0	0	0	2,705		
Myril Hoag	June 6, 1934	New York Yankees	AL	Boston Red Sox	6	6	0	0	0	854		
Doc Cramer (2)	July 13, 1935	Philadelphia Athletics	AL	Detroit Tigers	6	6	1	0	0	2,705		
Terry Moore	September 5, 1935	St. Louis Cardinals	NL	Boston Braves	6	6	1	0	0	1,318		
Bruce Campbell	July 2, 1936	Cleveland Indians	AL	St. Louis Browns	6	6	1	0	0	1,382		
Rip Radcliff	July 18, 1936	Chicago White Sox	AL	Philadelphia Athletics	7	6	2	0	0	1,267		
Ernie Lombardi^{†}	May 9, 1937	Cincinnati Reds	NL	Philadelphia Phillies	6	6	1	0	0	1,792		
Hank Steinbacher	June 22, 1938	Chicago White Sox	AL	Washington Senators	6	6	1	0	0	170		
Cookie Lavagetto	September 23, 1939	Brooklyn Dodgers	NL	Philadelphia Phillies	6	6	1	1	0	945		
George Myatt	May 1, 1944	Washington Senators	AL	Boston Red Sox	6	6	1	0	0	381		
Stan Spence	June 1, 1944	Washington Senators	AL	St. Louis Browns	6	6	0	0	1	1,090		
George Kell^{†}	September 20, 1946	Detroit Tigers	AL	Cleveland Indians	7	6	1	0	0	2,054		
Walker Cooper	July 6, 1949	Cincinnati Reds	NL	Chicago Cubs	7	6	0	0	3	1,341		
Johnny Hopp	May 14, 1950	Pittsburgh Pirates	NL	Chicago Cubs	6	6	0	0	2	1,262		
Jim Fridley	April 29, 1952	Cleveland Indians	AL	Philadelphia Athletics	6	6	0	0	0	105		
Connie Ryan	April 16, 1953	Philadelphia Phillies	NL	Pittsburgh Pirates	6	6	2	0	0	988		
Jim Piersall	June 10, 1953	Boston Red Sox	AL	St. Louis Browns	6	6	1 (Note: Both Baseball Almanac and MLB.com incorrectly list Piersall as having no extra base hits during the game. He in fact collected a double in the 6th inning, as confirmed by the Hartford Courant, Baseball-Reference.com, and Retrosheet.)	0	0	1,604		
Dick Groat	May 13, 1960	Pittsburgh Pirates	NL	Milwaukee Braves	6	6	3	0	0	2,138		
Floyd Robinson	July 22, 1962	Chicago White Sox	AL	Boston Red Sox	6	6	0	0	0	929		
Jesús Alou	July 10, 1964	San Francisco Giants	NL	Chicago Cubs	6	6	0	0	1	1,216		
Bob Oliver	May 4, 1969	Kansas City Royals	AL	California Angels	6	6	1	0	1	745		
Félix Millán	July 6, 1970	Atlanta Braves	NL	San Francisco Giants	6	6	1	1	0	1,617		
Johnny Briggs	August 4, 1973	Milwaukee Brewers	AL (Note: The Milwaukee Brewers were part of the American League until the 1997 season, after which they moved to the National League.)	Cleveland Indians	6	6	2	0	0	1,041		
Rennie Stennett	September 16, 1975	Pittsburgh Pirates	NL	Chicago Cubs	7	7	2	1	0	1,239		
Jorge Orta	June 15, 1980	Cleveland Indians	AL	Minnesota Twins	6	6	1	0	0	1,619		
Kevin Seitzer	August 2, 1987	Kansas City Royals	AL	Boston Red Sox	6	6	1	0	2	1,557		
Kirby Puckett^{†}	August 30, 1987	Minnesota Twins	AL	Milwaukee Brewers	6	6	2	0	2	2,304		
Wally Backman	April 27, 1990	Pittsburgh Pirates	NL	San Diego Padres	6	6	1	0	0	893		
Sammy Sosa	July 2, 1993	Chicago Cubs	NL	Colorado Rockies	6	6	1	0	0	2,408		
Kevin Reimer	August 24, 1993	Milwaukee Brewers	AL	Oakland Athletics	6	6	2	0	0	376		
Andrés Galarraga	July 3, 1995	Colorado Rockies	NL	Houston Astros	6	6	1	0	2	2,333		
Lance Johnson	September 23, 1995	Chicago White Sox	AL	Minnesota Twins	6	6	0	3	0	1,565		
Cal Ripken Jr.^{†}	June 13, 1999	Baltimore Orioles	AL	Atlanta Braves	6	6	1	0	2	3,184		
Edgardo Alfonzo	August 30, 1999	New York Mets	NL	Houston Astros	6	6	1	0	3	1,532		
Damion Easley	August 8, 2001	Detroit Tigers	AL	Texas Rangers	6	6	0	0	1	1,386		
Shawn Green	May 23, 2002	Los Angeles Dodgers	NL	Milwaukee Brewers	6	6	1	0	4	2,003		
Frank Catalanotto	May 1, 2004	Toronto Blue Jays	AL	Chicago White Sox	6	6	1	0	0	1,113		
Carlos Peña	May 27, 2004	Detroit Tigers	AL	Kansas City Royals	6	6	1	0	2	1,146		
Omar Vizquel	August 31, 2004	Cleveland Indians	AL	New York Yankees	7	6	2	0	0	2,877		
Joe Randa	September 9, 2004	Kansas City Royals	AL	Detroit Tigers	7	6	1	0	0	1,543		
Raúl Ibañez	September 22, 2004	Seattle Mariners	AL	Anaheim Angels	6	6	0	0	0	2,034		
Chone Figgins	June 18, 2007	Los Angeles Angels	AL	Houston Astros	6	6	1	1	0	1,298		
Willie Harris	July 21, 2007	Atlanta Braves	NL	St. Louis Cardinals	6	6	0	2	0	580		
Johnny Damon	June 7, 2008	New York Yankees	AL	Kansas City Royals	6	6	1	0	0	2,769		
Ian Kinsler	April 15, 2009	Texas Rangers	AL	Baltimore Orioles	6	6^{^}	2^{^}	1^{^}	1^{^}	1,999		
Freddy Sanchez	May 25, 2009	Pittsburgh Pirates	NL	Chicago Cubs	6	6	1	0	1	1,012		
Adrián González	August 11, 2009	San Diego Padres	NL	Milwaukee Brewers	6	6	1	0	0	2,050		
Alex Ríos	July 9, 2013	Chicago White Sox	AL	Detroit Tigers	6	6	0	1	0	1,778		
Charlie Blackmon	April 4, 2014	Colorado Rockies	NL	Arizona Diamondbacks	6	6	3	0	1	1794		
C. J. Cron^{‡}	July 2, 2016	Los Angeles Angels	AL	Boston Red Sox	6	6	1	0	2	953		
Wilmer Flores^{‡}	July 3, 2016	New York Mets	NL	Chicago Cubs	6	6	0	0	2	1006		
Anthony Rendon^{‡}	April 30, 2017	Washington Nationals	NL	New York Mets	6	6	1	0	3	1218		
George Springer^{‡}	May 7, 2018	Houston Astros	AL	Oakland Athletics	6	6	1	0	1	1322		
Phillip Ervin	July 13, 2019	Cincinnati Reds	NL	Colorado Rockies	6	6	1	1	0	145		
Lourdes Gurriel Jr.^{‡}	July 22, 2022	Toronto Blue Jays	AL	Boston Red Sox	7	6	1	0	0	768		
Luis García Jr.^{‡}	May 26, 2023	Washington Nationals	NL	Kansas City Royals	6	6	2	0	0	443		
Shohei Ohtani^{‡}	September 19, 2024	Los Angeles Dodgers	NL	Miami Marlins	6	6	2	0	3	857		
Austin Wynns^{‡}	April 20, 2025	Cincinnati Reds	NL	Baltimore Orioles	7	6	0	0	1	153		
Nick Kurtz^{‡}	July 25, 2025	Athletics	AL	Houston Astros	6	6	1	0	4	99		

=== Six hits in extra-inning games ===
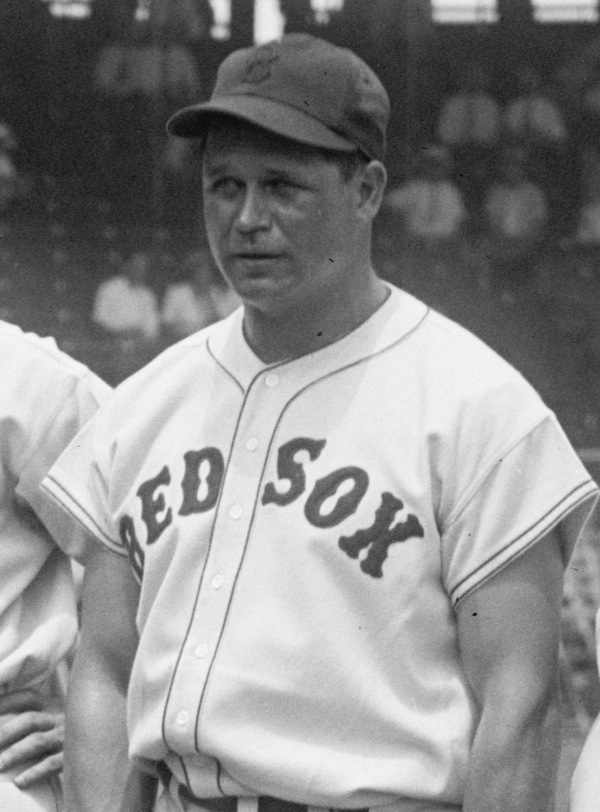
Jimmie Foxx amassed six hits in an extra-inning game twice.

As of 2019, 47 different players have recorded at least six hits in an extra-inning Major League Baseball (MLB) game. Only Jimmie Foxx has accomplished the feat more than once in his career, and no player has ever amassed more than nine hits in a game, with Johnny Burnett holding that distinction. Kirby Puckett is the only player to collect six hits in both a nine-inning and an extra-inning game.

The following list is kept separate from the above list of players who have six or more hits in a nine-inning game. This is due to the differing number of innings played during an extra-inning game, the lack of a definitive endpoint to the game that would otherwise allow for a fair comparison to be made, and the advantage of having more opportunities at bat during an extra-inning game as opposed to one lasting nine innings.

Key
Inn.	Innings played during the game
§	Indicates the player recorded six hits before the end of the ninth inning (Note: The end of the ninth inning marks the start of extra innings if the game remains tied.)

MLB hitters with six hits in an extra-inning game
Player	Date	Team	Lge.	Opposing team	Inn.	AB	Hits	2B	3B	HR	Career hits	Box	Ref
Paul Hines	August 26, 1879	Providence Grays	NL	Troy Trojans	10	6	6	0	0	0	2,133	—N/a	
John Boyle	July 6, 1893	Philadelphia Phillies	NL	Chicago Cubs	11	6	6	1	0	0	1,069	—N/a	
Chief Zimmer	July 11, 1894	Cleveland Spiders	NL	Washington Senators	10	6	6	2	0	0	1,225	—N/a	
Dick Harley	June 24, 1897	St. Louis Browns	NL	Pittsburgh Pirates	12	6	6	1	0	0	755	—N/a	
Carson Bigbee	August 22, 1917	Pittsburgh Pirates	NL	Brooklyn Robins	22	11	6	0	0	0	1,205		
Bobby Veach	September 17, 1920	Detroit Tigers	AL	Boston Red Sox	12	6	6^{^}	1^{^}	1^{^}	1^{^}	2,063		
George Sisler^{†}	August 9, 1921	St. Louis Browns	AL	Washington Senators	19	9	6	0	1	0	2,812		
Johnny Gooch	July 7, 1922	Pittsburgh Pirates	NL	New York Giants	18	8	6	1	0	0	662		
Max Carey^{†}	July 7, 1922	Pittsburgh Pirates	NL	New York Giants	18	6	6	1	0	0	2,665		
Lloyd Waner^{†}	June 15, 1929	Pittsburgh Pirates	NL	New York Giants	14	8	6	1	1	0	2,459		
Hank DeBerry	June 23, 1929	Brooklyn Robins	NL	New York Giants	14	7	6	0	0	0	494		
Jimmie Foxx^{†}	May 30, 1930	Philadelphia Athletics	AL	Washington Senators	13	7	6	2	1	0	2,646		
Jimmie Foxx^{†} (2)	July 10, 1932	Philadelphia Athletics	AL	Cleveland Indians	18	9	6	1	0	3	2,646		
Johnny Burnett	July 10, 1932	Cleveland Indians	AL	Philadelphia Athletics	18^{§}	11	9	2	0	0	521		
Sam West	April 13, 1933	St. Louis Browns	AL	Chicago White Sox	11	6	6	1	0	0	1,838		
Bob Johnson	June 16, 1934	Philadelphia Athletics	AL	Chicago White Sox	11	6	6	1	0	2	2,051		
Frank Demaree	July 5, 1937	Chicago Cubs	NL	St. Louis Cardinals	14	7	6	3	0	0	1,241		
Joe DeMaestri	July 8, 1955	Kansas City Athletics	AL	Detroit Tigers	11	6	6	0	0	0	813		
Pete Runnels	August 30, 1960	Boston Red Sox	AL	Detroit Tigers	15	7	6	1	0	0	1,854		
Rocky Colavito	June 24, 1962	Detroit Tigers	AL	New York Yankees	22	10	7	0	1	0	1,730		
Joe Morgan^{†}	July 8, 1965	Houston Astros	NL (Note: The Houston Astros were part of the National League until the 2012 season, after which they moved to the American League.)	Milwaukee Braves	12	6	6	1	0	2	2,517		
Jim Northrup	August 28, 1969	Detroit Tigers	AL	Oakland Athletics	13	6	6	0	0	2	1,254		
César Gutiérrez	June 21, 1970	Detroit Tigers	AL	Cleveland Indians	12	7	7	1	0	0	128		
Don Kessinger	June 17, 1971	Chicago Cubs	NL	St. Louis Cardinals	10	6	6	1	0	0	1,931		
Willie Davis	May 24, 1973	Los Angeles Dodgers	NL	New York Mets	19	9	6	0	0	0	2,561		
Bill Madlock	July 26, 1975	Chicago Cubs	NL	New York Mets	10	6	6	0	1	0	2,008		
José Cardenal	May 2, 1976	Chicago Cubs	NL	San Francisco Giants	14	7	6	1	0	1	1,913		
Gene Richards	July 26, 1977	San Diego Padres	NL	Montreal Expos	15	7	6	1	0	0	1,028		
Jerry Remy	September 3, 1981	Boston Red Sox	AL	Seattle Mariners	20	10	6	0	0	0	1,226		
Joe Lefebvre	September 13, 1982	San Diego Padres	NL	Los Angeles Dodgers	16	8	6	1	0	1	281		
Kirby Puckett^{†} (2) (Note: This was the second six-hit game in Puckett's career, but the first to occur in an extra-inning game.)	May 23, 1991	Minnesota Twins	AL	Texas Rangers	11	7	6	0	1	0	2,304		
Carlos Baerga	April 11, 1992	Cleveland Indians	AL	Boston Red Sox	19	9	6	0	0	0	1,583		
Tony Gwynn^{†}	August 4, 1993	San Diego Padres	NL	San Francisco Giants	12	7	6	2	0	0	3,141		
Rondell White	June 11, 1995	Montreal Expos	NL	San Francisco Giants	13	7	6^{^}	2^{^}	1^{^}	1^{^}	1,519		
Mike Benjamin	June 14, 1995	San Francisco Giants	NL	Chicago Cubs	13	7	6	1	0	0	442		
Gerald Williams	May 1, 1996	New York Yankees	AL	Baltimore Orioles	15	8	6	0	0	1	780		
Garret Anderson	September 27, 1996	California Angels	AL	Texas Rangers	15	7	6	0	0	0	2,529		
Paul Lo Duca	May 28, 2001	Los Angeles Dodgers	NL	Colorado Rockies	11	6	6	0	0	1	1,112		
Nomar Garciaparra	June 21, 2003	Boston Red Sox	AL	Philadelphia Phillies	13	6	6	0	0	0	1,747		
Alfonso Soriano	May 8, 2004	Texas Rangers	AL	Detroit Tigers	10^{§}	6	6	2	0	0	2,095		
Skip Schumaker	July 26, 2008	St. Louis Cardinals	NL	New York Mets	14	7	6	0	0	0	905		
Jean Segura^{‡}	May 28, 2013	Milwaukee Brewers	NL	Minnesota Twins	14	7	6	0	0	0	1,545		
Chase Utley	July 6, 2016	Los Angeles Dodgers	NL	Baltimore Orioles	14	7	6	2	0	0	1,885		
Brandon Crawford	August 8, 2016	San Francisco Giants	NL	Miami Marlins	14	8	7	1	1	0	1,404		
Andrew McCutchen^{‡}	April 7, 2018	San Francisco Giants	NL	Los Angeles Dodgers	14	7	6	1	0	1	2,149		
Christian Yelich^{‡}	August 29, 2018	Milwaukee Brewers	NL	Cincinnati Reds	10^{§}	6	6^{^}	1^{^}	1^{^}	1^{^}	1,590		
Ryan Braun	May 4, 2019	Milwaukee Brewers	NL	New York Mets	18	8	6	2	0	0	1,963		
Rafael Devers^{‡}	August 13, 2019	Boston Red Sox	AL	Cleveland Indians	10	6	6	4	0	0	1,165		

== See also ==
- List of Major League Baseball hit records
