= Al Johnson (baseball executive) =

American business executive and baseball owner

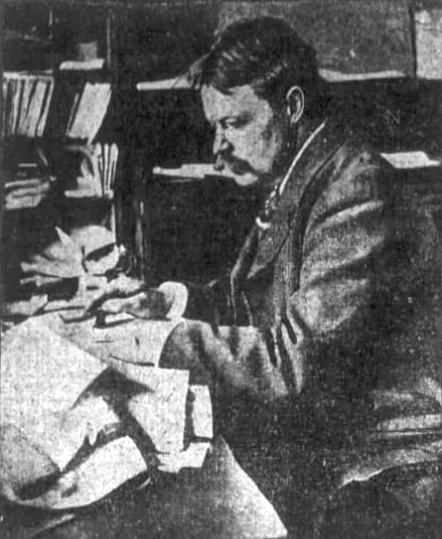
- Johnson, from The Brooklyn Times of July 3, 1901
- Born: December 24, 1860; Kentucky (Note: Newspaper reports of his death gave Johnson's place of birth as Kentucky. His entry in the 1880 census lists him as being born in Arkansas.)
- Died: July 2, 1901 (aged 40); Brooklyn, New York
- Occupations: Business executive in the streetcar industry; Owner of the Cleveland Infants (1890); Owner of the Cincinnati Reds (Note: Johnson owned the Reds between the 1890 and 1891 National League seasons.)

Albert Loftin Johnson (December 24, 1860 – July 2, 1901) was an American business executive in the streetcar industry. A baseball enthusiast, he was a key figure in the short-lived Players' League of 1890, while owning the Cleveland franchise in that league. He also briefly owned the Cincinnati Reds of the National League.

== Biography ==
Johnson's father, ex-Confederate States Army colonel Albert W. Johnson, moved north after the war and became a streetcar magnate, with operations in Indianapolis, Cleveland and New York City. The younger Johnson learned the business and, with the wealth gained, largely bankrolled the Players' League. He also owned the Cleveland Infants franchise in the new league. The 1890 Infants finished with a record of 55–75, seventh place in the eight-team Players' League.

Johnson purchased the Cincinnati Reds during the 1890–91 off-season, intending to move the team from the National League to the Players' League. However, in the aftermath of the league's first season, a year in which all baseball owners lost money, the new league folded. Johnson then sold the Reds to John T. Brush.

Johnson died at his home in Brooklyn in July 1901, of a heart attack. Newspaper reports of his death differed as to if he was married or not. His brother Tom was a prominent progressive politician, serving in the United States House of Representatives and as Mayor of Cleveland.
