= Zaza Harvey =

American baseball player (1879–1954)

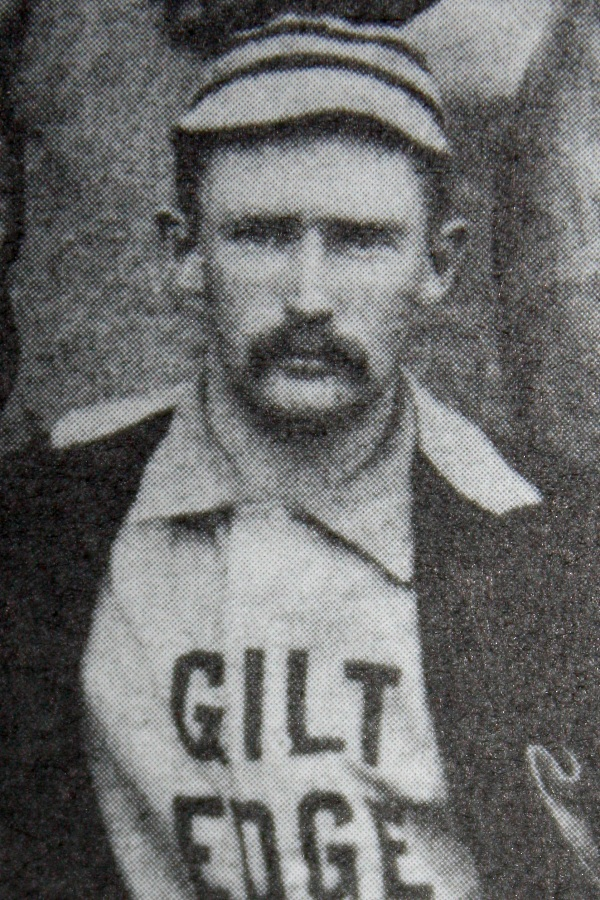
- Harvey with the Sacramento Gilt Edges, c. 1898–1899
- Outfielder / Pitcher
- Born: January 5, 1879; Saratoga, California, U.S.
- Died: June 3, 1954 (aged 75); Santa Monica, California, U.S.
- Batted: Left Threw: Left

MLB debut
- May 3, 1900, for the Chicago Orphans

Last MLB appearance
- May 4, 1902, for the Cleveland Bronchos

MLB statistics
- Batting average: .332
- Home runs: 1
- Runs batted in: 32
- Win–loss record: 3–7
- Earned run average: 3.47
- Strikeouts: 27
- Stats at Baseball Reference

Teams
- Chicago Orphans (1900); Chicago White Sox (1901); Cleveland Blues/Bronchos (1901–1902)

Ervin King "Zaza" Harvey (January 5, 1879 – June 3, 1954) was an American professional baseball player. He appeared as an outfielder and pitcher in the major leagues from 1900 to 1902 for the Chicago Orphans, Chicago White Sox, and Cleveland Blues/Bronchos.

== Biography ==
Harvey was born in 1879 in Saratoga, California. He made his professional baseball debut in 1897 for the Minneapolis Millers of the Western League. He pitched in five games (three starts) posting an 0–3 win–loss record with a 2.52 earned run average (ERA). As a batter, he went 2-for-9 for a .222 batting average. During that season, he also played briefly in the Western Association for the Peoria Blackbirds, also posting an 0–3 record in five pitching appearances, along with one game played as an outfielder. He hit 3-for-11 (.273) with Peoria. In 1898 and 1899, Harvey played for the Sacramento Gilt Edges, although statistics from those seasons are lacking.

Harvey made his major-league debut with the Chicago Orphans of the National League in 1900, appearing in two games, one as a pitcher. He was hitless in three at bats. After a brief stay in the majors, Harvey returned to the minors with the Minneapolis Millers. Harvey returned to the major leagues during the 1901 season, splitting time between the Chicago White Sox and Cleveland Blues of the American League. That season, he posted an overall .333 batting average (70-for-210) in 62 games, had 16 stolen bases, and as a pitcher made 16 appearances (nine starts) and posted a 3.62 ERA and 3–7 record.

Cleveland liked Harvey's talents enough that they signed him for the 1902 season (the team was known that season as the Cleveland Bronchos), but with one condition: his days on the mound were over and he was going to be strictly an outfielder. On April 25, 1902, Harvey went 6-for-6 at the plate for the Broncos in a game against the St. Louis Browns. Through 12 games that season, Harvey was batting .348 (16-for-46) and had one stolen base to his credit. He made what proved to be his final appearance in the majors on May 4, 1902.

Harvey's 1902 season, and baseball career, was cut short because he suffered from stomach issues. In May 1902, after he stopped playing, he visited the hot springs of West Baden Springs, Indiana, a popular destination for those who sought refuge from various ailments. In December 1902, his condition was still not improved, and in the spring of 1903 he took an ocean trip to Panama in hope of it having some benefit. In July 1903, he was reportedly close to returning, but he was unable to play, and in November 1903 he responded to an inquiry from Cleveland manager Bill Armour by stating he "fear[s] that my baseball playing days are over for good."

As of September 1918, Harvey was working as a laborer for the Santa Fe Railroad in the fuel oil department. Harvey died in 1954 in Santa Monica, California. He was interred at Woodlawn Memorial Cemetery.

== See also ==
- List of Major League Baseball single-game hits leaders
