= Patsy Tebeau =

American baseball player and manager (1864–1918)

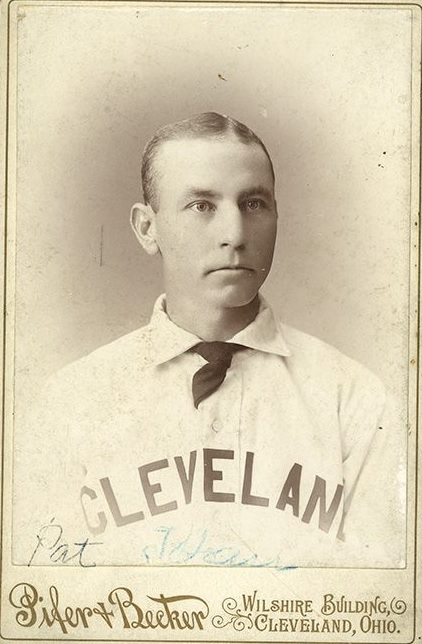
- Tebeau in 1893
- First baseman / Third baseman / Manager
- Born: December 5, 1864; St. Louis, Missouri, U.S.
- Died: May 16, 1918 (aged 53); St. Louis, Missouri, U.S.
- Batted: Right Threw: Right

MLB debut
- September 20, 1887, for the Chicago White Stockings

Last MLB appearance
- June 12, 1900, for the St. Louis Cardinals

MLB statistics
- Batting average: .279
- Home runs: 27
- Runs batted in: 735
- Managerial record: 726–583
- Stats at Baseball Reference

Teams
- As player: Chicago White Stockings (1887); Cleveland Spiders (1889); Cleveland Infants (1890); Cleveland Spiders (1891–1898); St. Louis Perfectos/Cardinals (1899–1900); As manager: Cleveland Infants (1890); Cleveland Spiders (1891–1898); St. Louis Perfectos/Cardinals (1899–1900)

Career highlights and awards
- Temple Cup champion (1895)

Oliver Wendell "Patsy" Tebeau (December 5, 1864 – May 16, 1918) was an American first baseman, third baseman, and manager in Major League Baseball.

== Career ==
Tebeau was born in St. Louis, Missouri, in 1864. His brother, George Tebeau, was also an MLB player.

Patsy started his professional baseball career with the Western League's St. Joseph Reds in 1886. The following season, while playing for Denver of the WL, he had a .424 batting average in 94 games. Tebeau made his major league debut with the National League's Chicago White Stockings in September of that year. In 20 games with Chicago, he batted .162. He then played in the Western Association in 1888. In 1889, Tebeau joined the NL's Cleveland Spiders and batted .282. The following year, he was a player-manager for the Cleveland Infants of the Players' League. In 1891, Tebeau returned to the Spiders and was a player-manager for the team until 1898. His lowest batting average with the Spiders was .244 in 1892, and his highest was .329 in 1893. The Spiders never finished a full season in first place in the National League, but Tebeau's team benefited from the season structure in 1892, 1895 and 1896; the 1892 season was a split-season that found Cleveland as the winner of the second half and the right to play in the World's Championship Series (the pre-modern postseason before the World Series). They would compete in the next rendition of postseason play in the League with the Temple Cup that matched the first and second place teams, and Cleveland would win once.

In March 1899, the Spiders assigned Tebeau to the St. Louis Perfectos. He managed the team before quitting in the middle of the 1900 season. Tebeau is one of just over a dozen managers to have won at least 400 games in the 19th century.

In his 13-year MLB career, Tebeau played 1,167 games and batted .279 with 27 home runs and 735 runs batted in. His managing record was 726–583–30. He was known for verbally abusing umpires and opposing players, for which he was criticized by journalists.

After retiring from baseball, Tebeau ran a saloon in St. Louis. His wife left him, and in 1918, he committed suicide by shooting himself in the head. He left a note stating that he was an "unhappy and miserable man."

== Managerial record ==
Team	Year	Regular season					Postseason			
Team	Year	Games	Won	Lost	Win %	Finish	Won	Lost	Win %	Result
CLE	1890	52	21	30	.412	7th in PL	–	–	–	–
CLE	1891	73	31	40	.437	5th in NL	–	–	–	–
CLE	1892	74	40	33	.548	5th in NL	-	-	-	-
CLE	1892	79	53	23	.697	1st in NL	0	5	.000 (Note: Game 1 ended in a tie)	Lost World Series (BOS)
CLE	1893	129	73	55	.570	3rd in NL	–	–	–	–
CLE	1894	130	68	61	.527	6th in NL	–	–	–	–
CLE	1895	132	84	46	.646	2nd in NL	4	1	.800	Won Temple Cup (BAL)
CLE	1896	135	80	48	.625	2nd in NL	0	4	.000	Lost Temple Cup (BAL)
CLE	1897	132	69	62	.527	5th in NL	–	–	–	–
CLE	1898	156	81	68	.544	5th in NL	–	–	–	–
STL	1899	155	84	67	.556	5th in NL	–	–	–	–
STL	1900	92	42	50	.457	(resigned)	–	–	–	–
Total		1,339 (Note: Tebeau also managed in 30 games that ended in ties)	726	583	.555		4	10	.400	

== See also ==
- List of Major League Baseball player-managers
