= Cinders O'Brien =

American baseball player (1867–1892)

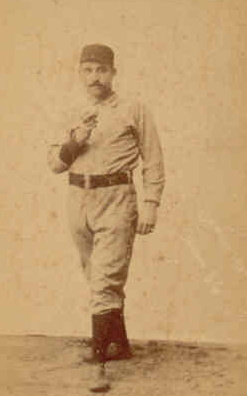
- Pitcher
- Born: April 15, 1867; Troy, New York, U.S.
- Died: March 11, 1892 (aged 24); West Troy, New York, U.S.
- Batted: Right Threw: Right

MLB debut
- June 23, 1888, for the Cleveland Blues

Last MLB appearance
- October 2, 1891, for the Boston Reds

MLB statistics
- Win–loss record: 59–65
- Earned run average: 3.68
- Strikeouts: 398
- Stats at Baseball Reference

Teams
- Cleveland Blues/Spiders (1888–1889); Cleveland Infants (1890); Boston Reds (1891)

John F. "Cinders" O'Brien AKA: Darby O'Brien (April 15, 1867 – March 11, 1892) was an American Major League Baseball pitcher from 1888 to 1891. He played with the Cleveland Infants, Cleveland Spiders, and Boston Reds. He had a 3.68 ERA at the end of his career.

O'Brien died in his hometown of Troy, New York at the age of 24 of pneumonia. He is interred at St. Patrick Cemetery in Watervliet, New York. At the time of his death, O'Brien was under contract with the St. Louis Browns.

== See also ==
- List of Major League Baseball annual saves leaders
- List of baseball players who died during their careers
