= 1890 Major League Baseball season =

1890 MLB season
- League: American Association (AA); National League (NL); Players' League (PL)
- Sport: Baseball
- Duration: Regular season: April 17 – October 15, 1890 (AA); April 19 – October 4, 1890 (NL, PL); World's Championship Series (AA vs. NL): October 17–28, 1890
- Games: 140
- Teams: 25 (8 active per league, 9 AA total)

Pennant winner
- AA champions: Louisville Colonels
- AA runners-up: Columbus Solons
- NL champions: Brooklyn Bridegrooms
- NL runners-up: Chicago Colts
- PL champions: Boston Reds
- PL runners-up: Brooklyn Ward's Wonders

World's Championship Series
- Venue: Eclipse Park, Louisville, Kentucky; Washington Park, Brooklyn, New York
- Champions: Series ended in a tie
- Runners-up: Brooklyn Bridegrooms / Louisville Colonels

MLB seasons
- ← 1889 1891 →

Locations of teams for the 1890 American Association season
American Association
Locations of teams for the 1890 National League season
National League
Locations of teams for the 1890 Players' League season
Players' League

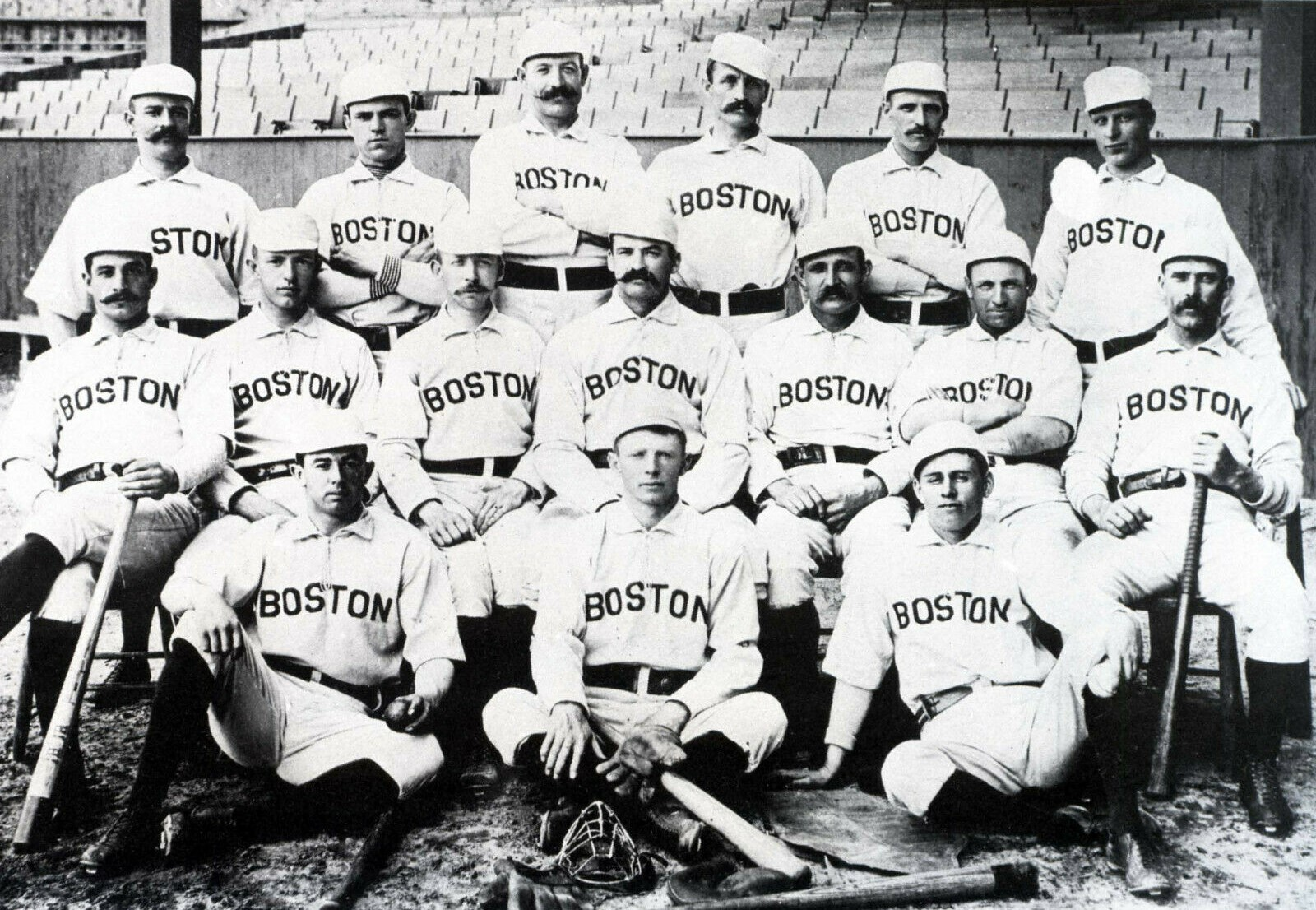
1890 Boston Reds of the Players League

The 1890 major league baseball season began on April 17, 1890. The National League and newly founded Players' League regular seasons ended on October 4, with the Brooklyn Bridegrooms and Boston Reds as the NL and PL pennant winners, respectively. The American Association regular season ended on October 15 and saw the Louisville Colonels the winners of the AA pennant. The postseason between the AA and NL began with Game 1 of the seventh World's Championship Series on October 17 and ended with Game 7 on October 28. The series ended in a tie, with the Bridegrooms and Colonels each with three wins, and a tie game. The series was unique in that the Bridegrooms reached the series back-to-back, but with each season in a different league, a feat that has not been matched since. The Reds had floated a three-way Championship series with them and the AA & NL pennant winners, though the idea fell on deaf ears.

This was the final season of a dual-league championship until the founding of the modern World Series in 1903 between the National League and American League.

The major league world was in turmoil in 1890, as many of the best players had jumped to the "outlaw" Players' League. Although the Brotherhood only lasted the one season, it had a detrimental financial effect on the other two leagues, especially the Association, who would not survive the following season, merging into the National League in December 1891.

Over the prior offseason, the Indianapolis Hoosiers and Washington Nationals of the National League, and Kansas City Cowboys of the American Association folded. The Brooklyn Bridegrooms and Cincinnati Red Stockings (now Reds) transfer from the American Association to the National League, while the Baltimore Orioles departed the AA for the minor league Atlantic Association, leaving four vacancies in the American Association that would be filled by the Brooklyn Gladiators (who would fold in August, being replace by a returning Orioles team), Rochester Broncos, Syracuse Stars, and Toledo Maumees.

Following the 1890 season, the single season Players' League disbanded during the offseason, with most teams either folding or merging with existing American Association and National League teams; the Boston Reds and Philadelphia Athletics would join the AA for the 1891 season, with the latter replacing the financially struggling original AA Philadelphia Athletics.

The major-league status of the Federal League was confirmed by the Special Baseball Records Committee (as convened by then-Commissioner of Baseball William Eckert) in 1969.

== Schedule ==
The 1890 schedule consisted of 140 games for all teams in the American Association, National League, and Players' League, each of which had eight active teams (the Baltimore Orioles would finish the Brooklyn Gladiators' schedule once they folded following their last game on August 25). Each team was scheduled to play 20 games against the other seven teams of their respective league. This continued the format put in place by the American Association since the 1886 season and by the National League since the 1888 season. This format would last until 1892.

American Association Opening Day took place on April 17 featuring six teams, while National League and Players' League Opening Days took place on April 19, each featuring their eight teams. The American Association would see its final day of the regular season on October 15 with a doubleheader between the Baltimore Orioles and Rochester Broncos. The National League would see its final day of the season on October 4, with a doubleheader between the Philadelphia Phillies and Cleveland Spiders. The Players' League would see its season end on the same day, with all eight teams playing. The 1890 World's Championship Series took place between October 17 and October 28.

=== Tripleheader ===
The 1890 season featured an extremely rare tripleheader—the first of three in National League and major-league history, when the Brooklyn Bridegrooms hosted the Pittsburgh Alleghenys on September 1 for three games. The Bridegrooms sweep the Alleghenys.

== Rule change ==
The 1890 season saw the following rule change:

- Two substitutes may be used and may enter at any time. Previously, the rules was that a predesignated substitute may be used only at the end of a complete inning.

== Teams ==
A dagger (†) denotes a team that folded mid-season
A double dagger (‡) denotes a team joined mid-season

League	Team	City	Ballpark	Capacity	Manager
American Association	Baltimore Orioles‡	Baltimore, Maryland	Oriole Park	7,000	Billy Barnie
American Association	Brooklyn Gladiators†	Ridgewood, New York	Ridgewood Park	10,000	Jim Kennedy
American Association	Columbus Solons	Columbus, Ohio	Recreation Park (Columbus)	6,500	Al Buckenberger
American Association	Columbus Solons	Columbus, Ohio	Recreation Park (Columbus)	6,500	Gus Schmelz
American Association	Columbus Solons	Columbus, Ohio	Recreation Park (Columbus)	6,500	Pat Sullivan
American Association	Louisville Colonels	Louisville, Kentucky	Eclipse Park	5,860	Jack Chapman
American Association	Philadelphia Athletics	Philadelphia, Pennsylvania	Jefferson Street Grounds	15,000	Bill Sharsig
American Association	Rochester Broncos	Rochester, New York	Culver Field	Unknown	Patrick Powers
American Association	St. Louis Browns	St. Louis, Missouri	Sportsman's Park	12,000	Tommy McCarthy
American Association	St. Louis Browns	St. Louis, Missouri	Sportsman's Park	12,000	John Kerins
American Association	St. Louis Browns	St. Louis, Missouri	Sportsman's Park	12,000	James Roseman
American Association	St. Louis Browns	St. Louis, Missouri	Sportsman's Park	12,000	Count Campau
American Association	St. Louis Browns	St. Louis, Missouri	Sportsman's Park	12,000	Joe Gerhardt
American Association	Syracuse Stars	Syracuse, New York	Star Park	Unknown	George Frazier
American Association	Syracuse Stars	Syracuse, New York	Star Park	Unknown	Wallace Fessenden
American Association	Toledo Maumees	Toledo, Ohio	Speranza Park	Unknown	Charlie Morton
National League	Boston Beaneaters	Boston, Massachusetts	South End Grounds	6,800	Frank Selee
National League	Brooklyn Bridegrooms	Brooklyn, New York	Washington Park	3,000	Bill McGunnigle
National League	Chicago Colts	Chicago, Illinois	West Side Park	6,000	Cap Anson
National League	Cincinnati Reds	Cincinnati, Ohio	American Park	3,000	Tom Loftus
National League	Cleveland Spiders	Cleveland, Ohio	National League Park	Unknown	Gus Schmelz
National League	Cleveland Spiders	Cleveland, Ohio	National League Park	Unknown	Robert Leadley
National League	New York Giants	New York, New York	Polo Grounds II	15,000	Jim Mutrie
National League	Philadelphia Phillies	Philadelphia, Pennsylvania	Philadelphia Base Ball Grounds	12,500	Harry Wright
National League	Philadelphia Phillies	Philadelphia, Pennsylvania	Philadelphia Base Ball Grounds	12,500	Jack Clements
National League	Philadelphia Phillies	Philadelphia, Pennsylvania	Philadelphia Base Ball Grounds	12,500	Al Reach
National League	Philadelphia Phillies	Philadelphia, Pennsylvania	Philadelphia Base Ball Grounds	12,500	Bob Allen
National League	Pittsburgh Alleghenys	Allegheny, Pennsylvania	Recreation Park (Pittsburgh)	17,000	Guy Hecker
Players' League	Boston Reds	Boston, Massachusetts	Congress Street Grounds	14,000	King Kelly
Players' League	Brooklyn Ward's Wonders	Brooklyn, New York	Eastern Park	12,000	John Montgomery Ward
Players' League	Buffalo Bisons	Buffalo, New York	Olympic Park	Unknown	Jack Rowe
Players' League	Buffalo Bisons	Buffalo, New York	Olympic Park	Unknown	Jay Faatz
Players' League	Chicago Pirates	Chicago, Illinois	South Side Park	6,450	Charles Comiskey
Players' League	Cleveland Infants	Cleveland, Ohio	Brotherhood Park	Unknown	Henry Larkin
Players' League	Cleveland Infants	Cleveland, Ohio	Brotherhood Park	Unknown	Patsy Tebeau
Players' League	New York Giants	New York, New York	Polo Grounds III	16,000	Buck Ewing
Players' League	Philadelphia Athletics	Philadelphia, Pennsylvania	Forepaugh Park	5,000	Jim Fogarty
Players' League	Philadelphia Athletics	Philadelphia, Pennsylvania	Forepaugh Park	5,000	Charlie Buffinton
Players' League	Pittsburgh Burghers	Allegheny, Pennsylvania	Exposition Park	6,500	Ned Hanlon

=== Neutral site and Sunday games ===
The Brooklyn Gladiators, Cleveland Spiders, and Pittsburgh Alleghenys played in 17 neutral site games in which they were treated as the home team. Meanwhile, blue laws restricted Sunday activities in several localities, causing several teams of the American Association (which was informally referred to as the "Beer & Whiskey League" due to its openness on alcohol, compared to the National and Players' Leagues) to play at ballparks in a different locality.

Team	City	Ballpark	Capacity	Games played	Type
Brooklyn Gladiators	New York, New York	Polo Grounds II	15,000	8	Neutral site
Brooklyn Gladiators	Maspeth, New York	Long Island Grounds	Unknown	2	Sunday
Cleveland Spiders	Indianapolis, Indiana	Indianapolis Park	Unknown	6	Neutral site
Cleveland Spiders	Detroit, Michigan	Recreation Park (Detroit)	Unknown	1	Neutral site
Philadelphia Athletics (AA)	Gloucester City, New Jersey	Gloucester Point Grounds	Unknown	13	Sunday
Pittsburgh Alleghenys	Canton, Ohio	Pastime Park	Unknown	1	Neutral site
Pittsburgh Alleghenys	Wheeling, West Virginia	Island Grounds	Unknown	1	Neutral site
Rochester Broncos	Irondequoit, New York	Windsor Beach Grounds	Unknown	6	Sunday
Syracuse Stars	Three Rivers, New York	Three Rivers Park	Unknown	5	Sunday
Syracuse Stars	Syracuse, New York	Iron Pier	Unknown	1	Sunday

1. In today's New York, New York.
2. In today's Pittsburgh, Pennsylvania.

== Standings ==
=== American Association ===
American Association
Team	W	L	Pct.	GB	Home	Road
Louisville Colonels	88	44	.667	—	57‍–‍13	31‍–‍31
Columbus Solons	79	55	.590	10	47‍–‍22	32‍–‍33
St. Louis Browns	78	58	.574	12	45‍–‍25	33‍–‍33
Toledo Maumees	68	64	.515	20	40‍–‍27	28‍–‍37
Rochester Broncos	63	63	.500	22	40‍–‍22	23‍–‍41
Baltimore Orioles	15	19	.441	24	8‍–‍11	7‍–‍8
Syracuse Stars	55	72	.433	30½	30‍–‍30	25‍–‍42
Philadelphia Athletics	54	78	.409	34	36‍–‍36	18‍–‍42
Brooklyn Gladiators	26	73	.263	45½	15‍–‍22	11‍–‍51

=== National League ===
National League
Team	W	L	Pct.	GB	Home	Road
Brooklyn Bridegrooms	86	43	.667	—	58‍–‍16	28‍–‍27
Chicago Colts	83	53	.610	6½	48‍–‍24	35‍–‍29
Philadelphia Phillies	78	53	.595	9	54‍–‍21	24‍–‍32
Cincinnati Reds	77	55	.583	10½	50‍–‍23	27‍–‍32
Boston Beaneaters	76	57	.571	12	43‍–‍23	33‍–‍34
New York Giants	63	68	.481	24	37‍–‍27	26‍–‍41
Cleveland Spiders	44	88	.333	43½	30‍–‍37	14‍–‍51
Pittsburgh Alleghenys	23	113	.169	66½	14‍–‍25	9‍–‍88

=== Players' League ===
Players' League
Team	W	L	Pct.	GB	Home	Road
Boston Reds	81	48	.628	—	48‍–‍21	33‍–‍27
Brooklyn Ward's Wonders	76	56	.576	6½	46‍–‍19	30‍–‍37
New York Giants	74	57	.565	8	47‍–‍19	27‍–‍38
Chicago Pirates	75	62	.547	10	46‍–‍23	29‍–‍39
Philadelphia Athletics	68	63	.519	14	35‍–‍30	33‍–‍33
Pittsburgh Burghers	60	68	.469	20½	37‍–‍28	23‍–‍40
Cleveland Infants	55	75	.423	26½	31‍–‍30	24‍–‍45
Buffalo Bisons	36	96	.273	46½	23‍–‍42	13‍–‍54

=== Tie games ===
31 tie games (15 in AA, 9 in NL, 7 in PL), which are not factored into winning percentage or games behind (and were often replayed again), occurred throughout the season.

==== American Association ====
- Baltimore Orioles, 4
- Brooklyn Gladiators, 2
- Columbus Solons, 6
- Louisville Colonels, 4
- Rochester Broncos, 7
- St. Louis Browns, 4
- Syracuse Stars, 1
- Toledo Maumees, 2

==== National League ====
- Boston Beaneaters, 1
- Chicago Colts, 3
- Cincinnati Reds, 2
- Cleveland Spiders, 4
- New York Giants, 4
- Philadelphia Phillies, 2
- Pittsburgh Alleghenys, 2

==== Players' League ====
- Boston Reds, 4
- Brooklyn Ward's Wonders, 1
- Buffalo Bisons, 2
- Chicago Pirates, 1
- Cleveland Infants, 1
- New York Giants, 1
- Philadelphia Athletics, 1
- Pittsburgh Burghers, 3

== Postseason ==
=== Bracket ===
World's Championship Series
AA	Louisville Colonels	0	3	7^{8}	5	2	9	6
NL	Brooklyn Bridegrooms	9^{8}	5	7^{8}	4	7	8	2

== Managerial changes ==
=== Off-season ===
Team	Former Manager	New Manager
Baltimore Orioles	Billy Barnie	Team transferred to minor league Atlantic Association
Boston Beaneaters	Jim Hart	Frank Selee
Cincinnati Reds	Gus Schmelz	Tom Loftus
Cleveland Spiders	Tom Loftus	Gus Schmelz
Indianapolis Hoosiers	Jack Glasscock	Team folded
Kansas City Cowboys	Bill Watkins	Team folded
Pittsburgh Alleghenys	Ned Hanlon	Guy Hecker
St. Louis Browns	Charles Comiskey	Tommy McCarthy
Washington Nationals	Arthur Irwin	Team folded

=== In-season ===
Team	Former Manager	New Manager
Baltimore Orioles	Team transferred from minor league Atlantic Association	Billy Barnie
Brooklyn Gladiators	Jim Kennedy	Team folded
Cleveland Spiders	Gus Schmelz	Robert Leadley
Columbus Solons	Al Buckenberger	Gus Schmelz
Columbus Solons	Gus Schmelz	Pat Sullivan
Philadelphia Phillies	Harry Wright	Jack Clements
Philadelphia Phillies	Jack Clements	Al Reach
Philadelphia Phillies	Al Reach	Bob Allen
St. Louis Browns	Tommy McCarthy	John Kerins
St. Louis Browns	John Kerins	James Roseman
St. Louis Browns	James Roseman	Count Campau
St. Louis Browns	Count Campau	Joe Gerhardt
Syracuse Stars	Wallace Fessenden	George Frazier

== League leaders ==
Any team shown in small text indicates a previous team a player was on during the season.

=== American Association ===
Hitting leaders
Stat	Player	Total
AVG	Jimmy Wolf (LOU)	.363
OPS	Denny Lyons (PHA)	.992
HR	Count Campau (STL)	9
RBI	Spud Johnson (COL)	113
R	Jim McTamany (COL)	140
H	Jimmy Wolf (LOU)	197
SB	Tommy McCarthy (STL)	83

Pitching leaders
Stat	Player	Total
W	Sadie McMahon (BAL/PHA)	36
L	Bob Barr (RCH); John Keefe (SYR)	24
ERA	Scott Stratton (LOU)	2.36
K	Sadie McMahon (BAL/PHA)	291
IP	Sadie McMahon (BAL/PHA)	509.0
SV	Herb Goodall (LOU)	4
WHIP	Scott Stratton (LOU)	1.065

=== National League ===
Hitting leaders
Stat	Player	Total
AVG	Jack Glasscock (NYG)	.336
OPS	Mike Tiernan (NYG)	.880
HR	Thomas Burns (BRO); Mike Tiernan (NYG); Walt Wilmot (CHI)	13
RBI	Thomas Burns (BRO)	128
R	Hub Collins (BRO)	148
H	Jack Glasscock (NYG); Sam Thompson (PHI)	172
SB	Sam Thompson (PHI)	102

Pitching leaders
Stat	Player	Total
W	Bill Hutchinson (CHI)	41
L	Amos Rusie (NYG)	34
ERA	Billy Rhines (CIN)	1.95
K	Amos Rusie (NYG)	341
IP	Bill Hutchinson (CHI)	603.0
SV	Dave Foutz (BRO); Kid Gleason (PHI); Bill Hutchinson (CHI)	2
WHIP	Billy Rhines (CIN)	1.121

=== Players' League ===
Hitting leaders
Stat	Player	Total
AVG	Pete Browning (CLI)	.373
OPS	Roger Connor (NYK)	.998
HR	Hardy Richardson (BSR)	16
RBI	Hardy Richardson (BSR)	152
R	Hugh Duffy (CPI)	161
H	Hugh Duffy (CPI)	191
SB	Harry Stovey (BSR)	97

Pitching leaders
Stat	Player	Total
W	Mark Baldwin (CPI)	33
L	George Haddock (BUF)	26
ERA	Silver King (CPI)	2.69
K	Mark Baldwin (CPI)	206
IP	Mark Baldwin (CPI)	492.0
SV	George Hemming (BKW/CLI); Hank O'Day (NYK)	3
WHIP	Harry Staley (PBU)	1.213

== Milestones ==
=== Batters ===
==== Cycles ====
- Mike Tiernan (NYG):
  - Tiernan hit for his second cycle and second in franchise history, on June 28 against the Cincinnati Reds.
- Bill Van Dyke (TOL):
  - Van Dyke hit for his first cycle and first in franchise history, on July 5 against the Syracuse Stars.
- Jumbo Davis (BKG/STL):
  - Davis hit for his first cycle and first in franchise history, on July 18 against the Louisville Colonels.
- Roger Connor (NYK):
  - Connor hit for his first cycle and first in franchise history as a part of the Brooklyn Gladiators, on July 21 against the Buffalo Bisons.
- Oyster Burns (BRO):
  - Burns hit for his first cycle and first in franchise history, in game two of a doubleheader on August 1 against the Pittsburgh Alleghenys.
- John Reilly (CIN):
  - Reilly hit for his third cycle and fourth in franchise history, on August 6 against the Pittsburgh Alleghenys.
- Farmer Weaver (LOU):
  - Weaver hit for his first cycle and third in franchise history, on August 12 against the Syracuse Stars.

==== Other hitting accomplishments ====
- George Gore / Buck Ewing / Roger Connor (NYK):
  - Become the first trio to hit back-to-back-to-back home runs in a win over the Pittsburgh Burghers on May 31.
- Mike Griffin (PHQ):
  - Becomes the first player to reach base by way of error in all four at-bats in a game against the Pittsburgh Burghers on June 23.
- Harry Stovey (BSR):
  - Hit his 100th career home run on July 23 against the Chicago Pirates, becoming the first player to reach this mark.

=== Pitchers ===
==== No-hitters ====
- Ledell Titcomb (RCH):
  - Titcomb threw his first career no-hitter and the first no-hitter in franchise history, by defeating the Syracuse Stars 7–0 on September 15. Titcomb walked two, hit one by pitch, and struck out seven

==== Other pitching accomplishments ====
- Tim Keefe (NYK):
  - Became the second member of the 300-win club, defeating the Boston Reds on June 4, winning 9–4.
- Mickey Welch (NYG):
  - Became the third member of the 300-win club, defeating the Pittsburgh Alleghenys on July 28, winning 4–2.

=== Miscellaneous ===
- George Pinkney (BRO):
  - Set a Major League record for most consecutive games at 577 on April 30.
- Philadelphia Athletics (AA):
  - Set a Major League record for the most stolen bases by a team in a single game by stealing 19 bases against Grant Briggs of the Syracuse Stars on April 22 in a 17–6 victory.
- Philadelphia Athletics (PL):
  - Set a major league record for most runs scored in the sixth inning, by scoring 14 runs against the Buffalo Bisons on June 26.
- Brooklyn Bridegrooms / Pittsburgh Alleghenys:
  - Play in the first of three Major League tripleheader in history on September 1. Brooklyn sweeps Pittsburgh.

== Home field attendance ==
Only records for National League teams are available.

Team name	Wins	%±	Home attendance	Per game
Philadelphia Phillies	78	23.8%	148,366	1,952
Boston Beaneaters	76	−8.4%	147,539	2,235
Cincinnati Reds	77	1.3%	131,980	1,808
Brooklyn Grooms	86	−7.5%	121,412	1,641
Chicago Colts	83	23.9%	102,536	1,386
New York Giants	63	−24.1%	60,667	919
Cleveland Spiders	44	−27.9%	47,478	678
Pittsburgh Alleghenys	23	−62.3%	16,064	402

== Venues ==
The 1890 season saw the formation of the single-season Players' League, and with it, saw eight new major league teams in eight ballparks:

- The Boston Reds played at Congress Street Grounds.
- The Brooklyn Ward's Wonders played at Eastern Park, and played their final game there on September 12 against the Boston Reds.
- The Buffalo Bisons played at Olympic Park, and played their final game there on October 4 against the Brooklyn Ward's Wonders.
- The Chicago Pirates played at South Side Park, and played their final game there on October 4 against the New York Giants.
- The Cleveland Infants played at Brotherhood Park, and played their final game there on October 4 against the Philadelphia Athletics.
- The New York Giants played at Polo Grounds III, and played their final game there on September 18 against the Brooklyn Ward's Wonders.
- The Philadelphia Athletics played at Forepaugh Park.
- The Pittsburgh Burghers played at Exposition Park, and played their final game there in a doubleheader on October 4 against the Boston Reds.

With the Brooklyn Bridegrooms transferring to the National League, which bans Sunday games, their three-season tenure playing Sunday games at Ridgewood Park in Ridgewood, New York ends.

The 1890 season saw six teams playing at their respective ballparks for the last time, five of which moved into new ballparks for the start of the 1891 season while one team, the Brooklyn Gladiators, folded mid-season.

- The Baltimore Orioles would play their final game at Oriole Park on October 15 in a doubleheader against the Rochester Broncos.
- The Brooklyn Bridegrooms would play their final game at Washington Park on October 3 against the Pittsburgh Alleghenys.
- The Brooklyn Gladiators would play their final game at Ridgewood Park on August 2 against the Toledo Maumees.
- The Cleveland Spiders would play their final game at National League Park on October 4 in a doubleheader against the Philadelphia Phillies.
- The New York Giants would play their final game at the second iteration of the Polo Grounds on September 13 against the Brooklyn Bridegrooms.
- The Pittsburgh Alleghenys would play their final game at Recreation Park on September 30 against the Philadelphia Phillies.

For various reasons, three teams would play home games at neutral sites:

- The Brooklyn Gladiators played eight games at the Polo Grounds II in New York, New York on June 9 and July 23 through August 2, excluding Sundays.
- The Cleveland Spiders played six games at Indianapolis Park in Indianapolis, Indiana from July 28 through August 2 and played one game at Recreation Park (Detroit) in Detroit, Michigan on September 23.
- The Pittsburgh Alleghenys played one game at Pastime Park in Canton, Ohio on September 18 and at Island Grounds in Wheeling, West Virginia on September 22, the only major league game ever played in the state.

Four teams of the American Association hosted Sunday games:

- The Brooklyn Gladiators played two games at Long Island Grounds in Maspeth, New York on July 27 and August 3. The August 3 game would end up being the final home game of the Gladiators.
- The Philadelphia Athletics (AA) played 13 games at Gloucester Point Grounds in Gloucester City, New Jersey on April 27, May 11, 18, 25, June 15, 22, July 6, 20, 27, August 31, September 7, 14, and October 12.
- The Rochester Broncos played six games at Windsor Beach Grounds in Irondequoit, New York on May 11, 18, June 1, 8, 22, and July 20.
- The Syracuse Stars played five games at Three Rivers Park in Three Rivers, New York on May 18, 25, June 1, 15, and July 20 and one game at Iron Pier in Syracuse, New York on August 3.

== See also ==
- 1890 in baseball (Events, Births, Deaths)
