= Bill Gleason (pitcher) =

American baseball player (1868–1893)

- Pitcher
- Born: 1868; Cleveland, Ohio, U.S.
- Died: December 2, 1893 (aged 24–25); Cleveland, Ohio, U.S.
- Batted: Unknown Threw: Unknown

MLB debut
- April 24, 1890, for the Cleveland Infants

Last MLB appearance
- April 24, 1890, for the Cleveland Infants

MLB statistics
- Games pitched: 1
- Win–loss record: 0–1
- Earned run average: 27.00
- Stats at Baseball Reference

Teams
- Cleveland Infants (1890)

William Gleason (1868 – December 2, 1893) was an American Major League Baseball pitcher for the 1890 Cleveland Infants. He lost his only game, giving up 12 earned runs in 4 innings. Gleason was born and died in Cleveland, Ohio.
