= Jack Brennan (baseball) =

American baseball player (1862–1914)

- Catcher
- Born: September 15, 1862; St. Louis, Missouri, U.S.
- Died: March 24, 1914 (aged 51); Koch, Missouri, U.S.
- Batted: Right Threw: Right

MLB debut
- April 20, 1884, for the St. Louis Maroons

Last MLB appearance
- October 4, 1890, for the Cleveland Infants

MLB statistics
- Batting average: .220
- Home runs: 0
- Runs batted in: 48
- Stats at Baseball Reference

Teams
- St. Louis Maroons (1884–85); Kansas City Cowboys (1888); Philadelphia Athletics (American Association) (1889); Cleveland Infants (1890)

Jack Brennan (September 15, 1862 – March 24, 1914), (born as Gottlieb Doering), was an American professional baseball catcher in the late 19th century. In his five-year career he played with the St. Louis Maroons, Kansas City Cowboys of the American Association, Philadelphia Athletics of the AA, and the Cleveland Infants.

Brennan was born Gottlieb Doering in St. Louis, Missouri in 1862. After his playing career ended in 1890, he continued to work as an umpire in the St. Louis Area.

== Sources ==
- Career statistics from Baseball Reference · Baseball Reference (Minors) · Retrosheet · Baseball Almanac
