= Sy Sutcliffe =

American baseball player (1862–1893)

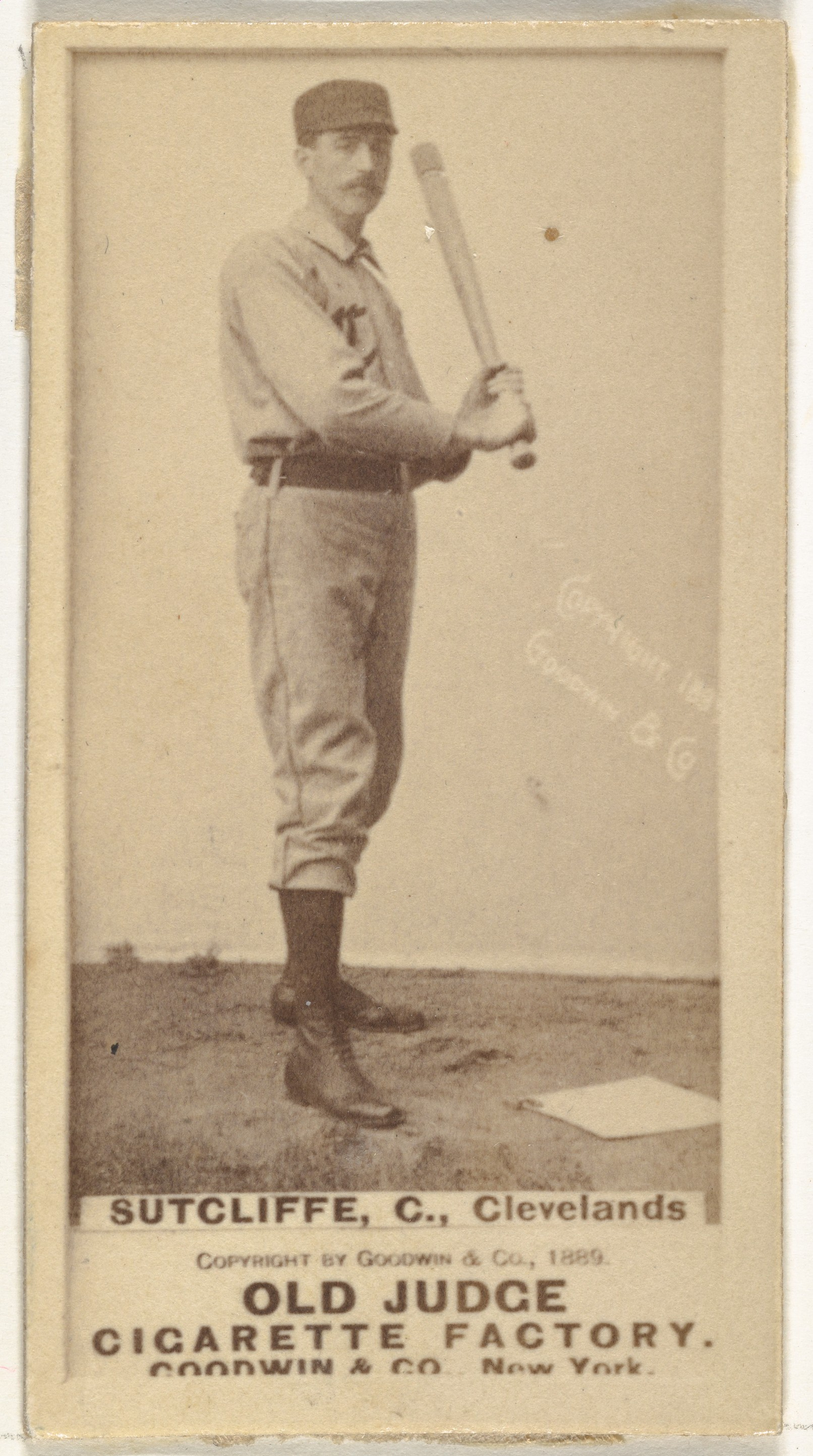
- 1889 baseball card of Sutcliffe
- Catcher
- Born: April 15, 1862; Wheaton, Illinois, U.S.
- Died: February 13, 1893 (aged 30); Wheaton, Illinois, U.S.
- Batted: Left Threw: Left

MLB debut
- October 2, 1884, for the Chicago White Stockings

Last MLB appearance
- October 6, 1892, for the Baltimore Orioles

MLB statistics
- Batting average: .288
- Hits: 381
- Runs batted in: 174
- Stats at Baseball Reference

Teams
- Chicago White Stockings (1884–1885); St. Louis Maroons (1885); Detroit Wolverines (1888); Cleveland Spiders (1889); Cleveland Infants (1890); Washington Statesmen (1891); Baltimore Orioles (1892)

Elmer Ellsworth "Sy" Sutcliffe (April 15, 1862 – February 13, 1893), also known as "Cy" or "Old Cy," was an American baseball player. He played eight seasons of Major League Baseball, principally as a catcher but also as a first baseman, outfielder, and shortstop, for seven major league teams. He died at age 30 from Bright's disease, just four months after playing in his final major league game.

== Early years ==
Sutcliffe was born in 1862 in Wheaton, Illinois.

== Professional baseball career ==
=== Chicago and St. Louis ===
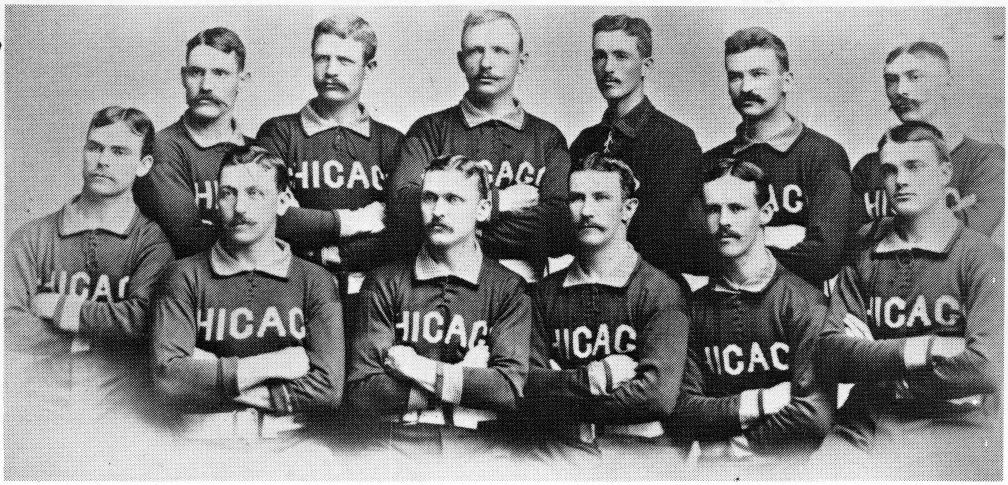
Sutcliffe (top row, third from right) with the 1885 Chicago White Stockings

Sutcliffe began his professional baseball career as a catcher for Cap Anson's Chicago White Stockings, making his major league debut on October 2, 1884, at age 22. When he debuted in the major leagues, Sutcliffe received attention principally for his unusual height of six feet, two inches. The Sporting Life in April 1885 observed:

"Two Chicago boys tell many amusing stories about their good-natured and popular giant catcher Sutcliffe. His pedal extremities are of liberal dimensions, and in Nashville a wagon ran on to one of his feet and then stopped. Sutcliffe never knew it until he turned to walk away and found his foot caught fast. In Chattanooga, as he was standing on the curbstone, a granger, slightly under the influence of liquor, drove up and hitched his horse to him, thinking he was a telegraph pole."

Sutcliffe began the 1885 season with the Chicago White Stockings. He appeared in only 11 games for the team and was released in mid-July with The Sporting Life reporting that he "must be added to the list of exploded phenomenon."

Shortly after being released by Chicago, he was signed by the St. Louis Maroons. He appeared in 16 games for the Maroons. Over the course of the entire 1885 season, Sutcliffe compiled a .152 batting average. Despite his low batting average, The Sporting Life on September 30, 1885, wrote that "Sutcliffe outranks Ewing as the best batting catcher of the League."

=== Minor leagues ===
In 1886, Sutcliffe played in the minor leagues for the Augusta and Savannah, Georgia clubs in the Southern Association. He appeared in 42 games as an outfielder and 34 as a catcher and compiled a .223 batting average.

Sutcliffe began the 1887 season with the Des Moines Hawkeyes in the Northwestern League. He appeared in 105 games for Des Moines, 51 as a catcher, and 34 as a right fielder, and raised his batting average by more than .100 points to .352. Late in the 1887 season, the Milwaukee Journal wrote: "Sutcliffe is a good catcher, but he is without doubt the laziest-looking and slowest-moving player in the Northwestern League."

=== Detroit Wolverines ===
At the end of the 1887 season, Sutcliffe joined the Detroit Wolverines to play in the 1887 World Series. Sutcliffe had 12 plate appearances in the World Series and managed one hit, a stolen base, and a run scored.

Sutcliffe remained with the Detroit club for the 1888 season. He appeared in 49 games and served in a utility role, playing 24 games at shortstop, 14 at catcher, five at first base, four in the outfield, and two at second base. He compiled a .257 batting average with 23 RBIs and six stolen bases in 1888. Sutcliffe displayed tremendous strength with his throwing arm, contributing 34 assists and five double plays turned in only 14 games as a catcher. In an April 1888 game against Cincinnati, "four Reds were nailed while making suckers of themselves trying to steal second on Sutcliffe, who threw like a catapult."

The 1888 Detroit team finished in fifth place with a 68–63 record. With high salaries owed to the team's star players, and gate receipts declining markedly, the team folded in October 1888 with the players being sold to other teams. Sutcliffe was sold to the Cleveland Spiders along with Ed Beatin, Henry Gruber, and Larry Twitchell.

=== Cleveland Spiders and Infants ===
Sutcliffe appeared in 46 games, 37 as a catcher and eight as a first baseman, for the Cleveland Spiders in 1889. He compiled a .248 batting average for the season. While playing for the Spiders, Sutcliffe became engaged in a salary dispute with the team. His contract with the Detroit team had called for him to be paid $2,450 -- $450 above the maximum salary permitted by the National League. Cleveland cut his salary to $1,750, and Sutcliffe protested. The Brotherhood of Professional Base-Ball Players supported Sutcliffe's case, and he was ultimately promised an additional $250.

In 1890, Sutcliffe jumped to the Players' League and joined the Cleveland Infants. He appeared in 99 games and compiled a .329 batting average in 386 at bats. Defensively, Sutcliffe ranked among the leading catchers in the Players' League with 115 assists (3rd), 84 games at catcher (3rd), 110 runners caught stealing (3rd), nine double plays turned (4th), and 265 putouts (5th). However, he also led the league with 50 errors and 55 passed balls and ranked second in the league with 213 stolen bases allowed.

=== Washington and Baltimore ===
When the Players' League disbanded after its first season, Sutcliffe joined the Omaha Lambs of the Western Association for the 1891 season. He appeared in 62 games for Omaha. In July 1891, Sutcliffe jumped from Omaha to the Washington Statesmen of the American Association. He returned to a utility role in Washington, appearing in 35 games as an outfielder, 22 as a catcher, three as a shortstop, and one as a third baseman. He also compiled career highs with a .353 batting average and a .409 on-base percentage. His .353 batting average was the highest in Major League Baseball, but he did not have a sufficient number of at bats to qualify for the batting title.

Sutcliffe concluded his major league career with the Baltimore Orioles in 1892. He appeared in 66 games, all at first base, for the Orioles and compiled a .279 batting average. His batting was considered to be good, "but late in the season it was evident that he was losing his grip."

== Family and death ==
Sutcliffe married Ella Traver on September 11, 1886. Their son, Elmer, was born in October 1886.

In February 1893, Sutcliffe died at his home in Wheaton, Illinois, of "Bright's disease of the kidneys". In its obituary for Sutcliffe, The Omaha Daily Bee described him as follows:

"He was quite a character in his way, and were it not for his intemperate habits would undoubtedly have been the best professional backstop in the country. As it was, his irregular habits impaired his efficiency and it was only at times he was seen at his best. He was quite a wit and was celebrated for the way in which he could roast an umpire, at the same time keeping his eyes in an entirely different direction from that individual."

Sutcliffe died at age 30, just four months after playing his final major league baseball game. He was buried at the Wheaton Cemetery.

== See also ==
- List of baseball players who died during their careers
