= Henry Gruber =

American baseball player (1863–1932)

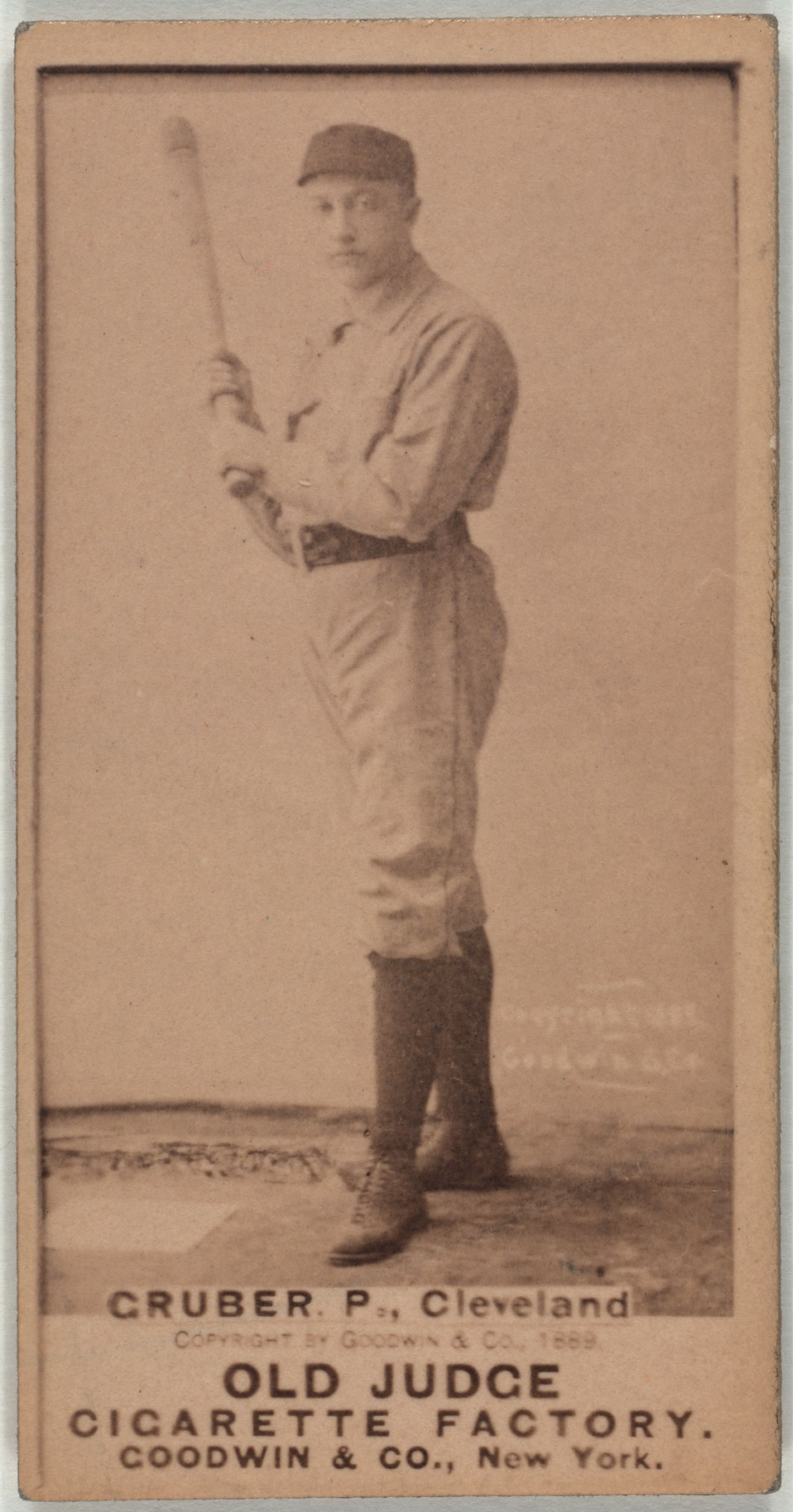
- Pitcher
- Born: December 14, 1863; Hamden, Connecticut, US
- Died: September 26, 1932 (aged 68); New Haven, Connecticut, US
- Batted: Right Threw: Right

MLB debut
- July 28, 1887, for the Detroit Wolverines

Last MLB appearance
- October 2, 1891, for the Cleveland Spiders

MLB statistics
- Win–loss record: 61–78
- Earned run average: 3.67
- Strikeouts: 346
- Stats at Baseball Reference

Teams
- Detroit Wolverines (1887–1888); Cleveland Spiders (1889); Cleveland Infants (1890); Cleveland Spiders (1891)

Henry John Gruber (December 14, 1863 – September 26, 1932) was an American professional baseball pitcher who played from 1885 through 1895. A right-hander, he played five years in Major League Baseball with the Detroit Wolverines (1887–88) and Spiders (1889, 1891) of the National League and the Cleveland Infants (1890) of the Players' League. He won 61 games and lost 78 in his career, and had a 3.67 earned run average (ERA). He was also the first professional coach hired by the Yale University baseball team, holding that position in 1892.

== Hartford ==
Gruber was born in Hamden, Connecticut, in December 1863. He began his professional baseball career at age 21, playing for the Hartford Babies of the Southern New England League. He compiled a 16-11 record and a remarkable 1.27 ERA in 241 innings pitched for the Babies. No records exist indicating where or whether Gruber pitched during the 1886 season.

Gruber spent most of the 1887 season with the Hartford Dark Blues of the Eastern League. He compiled a 21-7 record and 1.48 ERA in 255 innings for the Dark Blues.

== Detroit ==
After a second impressive season in the minors, Gruber was deemed ready for the major leagues. He made his major league debut on July 28, 1887, for the Detroit Wolverines of the National League. He appeared in seven games for the 1887 Detroit Wolverines, compiling a 4-3 record. His 2.74 ERA was the lowest on a team that won the National League pennant and went on to defeat the St. Louis Browns in the 1887 World Series. Gruber did not appear in any World Series games.

In 1888, Gruber remained with the Wolverines. The team had finished in first place with a 79-45 record in 1887, but dropped in 1888 to fifth place and a 68-63 record. Gruber improved his ERA from 2.74 in 1887 to 2.29 in 1888, ranking as the ninth lowest ERA in the National League during the 1888 season. However, as the team's fortunes declined, Gruber compiled a losing record of 11-14 in 1888.

== Cleveland ==
After the 1888 season ended, the Detroit Wolverines franchise was disbanded, and its players sold to other teams. In December 1888, the Cleveland Spiders purchased Gruber, Ed Beatin, Sy Sutcliffe and Larry Twitchell from the Wolverines. During the 1889 season, Gruber compiled a 7-16 record and 3.64 ERA in 25 games for the Spiders.

In 1890, Gruber jumped to the Cleveland Infants in the newly formed Players' League. The Spiders in February 1890 attempted, unsuccessfully, to induce Gruber to disregard his contract with the Players' League and return to the Spiders, as reflected in this report from Sporting Life:

"A dispatch from New Haven, Conn., states that Secretary Hawley, of the Players, has recently been in that city to induce pitcher Henry Gruber, who has signed with the Cleveland Players' League, to throw up his contract with the Brotherhood. Gruber refuses to do this and will stand by the Brotherhood, although he is dissatisfied with the contract he has signed with them, owing to the clause which provides that a player's salary shall not be paid unless the gate receipts are enough to meet the expenses. He has notified the manager that his salary must be sure and unhampered by condition."

Gruber appeared in a career high 48 games and pitched a career high 383 innings for the Infants in 1890. However, Gruber's control of the strike zone declined markedly in 1890. After walking only 94 batters in 1889, Gruber walked 204 batters in 1890—the third highest total in the Players' League. He also led the league with 36 wild pitches. In his Players' League debut, Gruber walked 16 batters in a 23-2 loss to the Buffalo Bisons. Gruber finished the 1890 season as a 20-game winner, but had even more losses with a 22-23 record.

The Players' League lasted only one season, and Gruber returned to the Cleveland Spiders in 1891. He compiled a 17-22 record and 4.27 ERA for the 1891 Spiders.

== Coaching and minor leagues ==
In 1892, while still under contract with Cleveland, Gruber was hired as the first professional coach of the Yale University baseball team. Gruber lived in New Haven and was hired for the position by team captain William H. Murphy. Shortly after he was hired, in late March 1892, Gruber was hit in the ankle by a batted ball while training the players in Yale's gymnasium. He reportedly limped to the street and took a horse car home. Though no bones were broken, the foot became swollen, and he was unable to pitch for some time.

Gruber did not return to the major leagues after the ankle injury, his last major league game having been pitched on October 2, 1891. He did continue to play in the minor leagues for another four years. He compiled a 22-17 record for the Troy Trojans in 1893, and an 18-15 record for the Springfield Maroons in 1895.

== Later years ==
In January 1896, shortly after his playing career ended, Sporting Life published the following update on Gruber: "Henry Gruber is looking like a lord nowadays when promenading on Chapel street [in New Haven]. There is a certain dark-eyed young lady who seems much smitten with Henry, and there is no doubt but what her affections are reciprocated." From 1897 to 1899, Gruber worked as an umpire in the Eastern League and the Connecticut League. In 1905, he became an umpire in the American League. Gruber died in 1932 at age 68 in New Haven, Connecticut.
