= Koch, Missouri =

- Robert Koch Hospital
- U.S. National Register of Historic Places
- U.S. Historic district
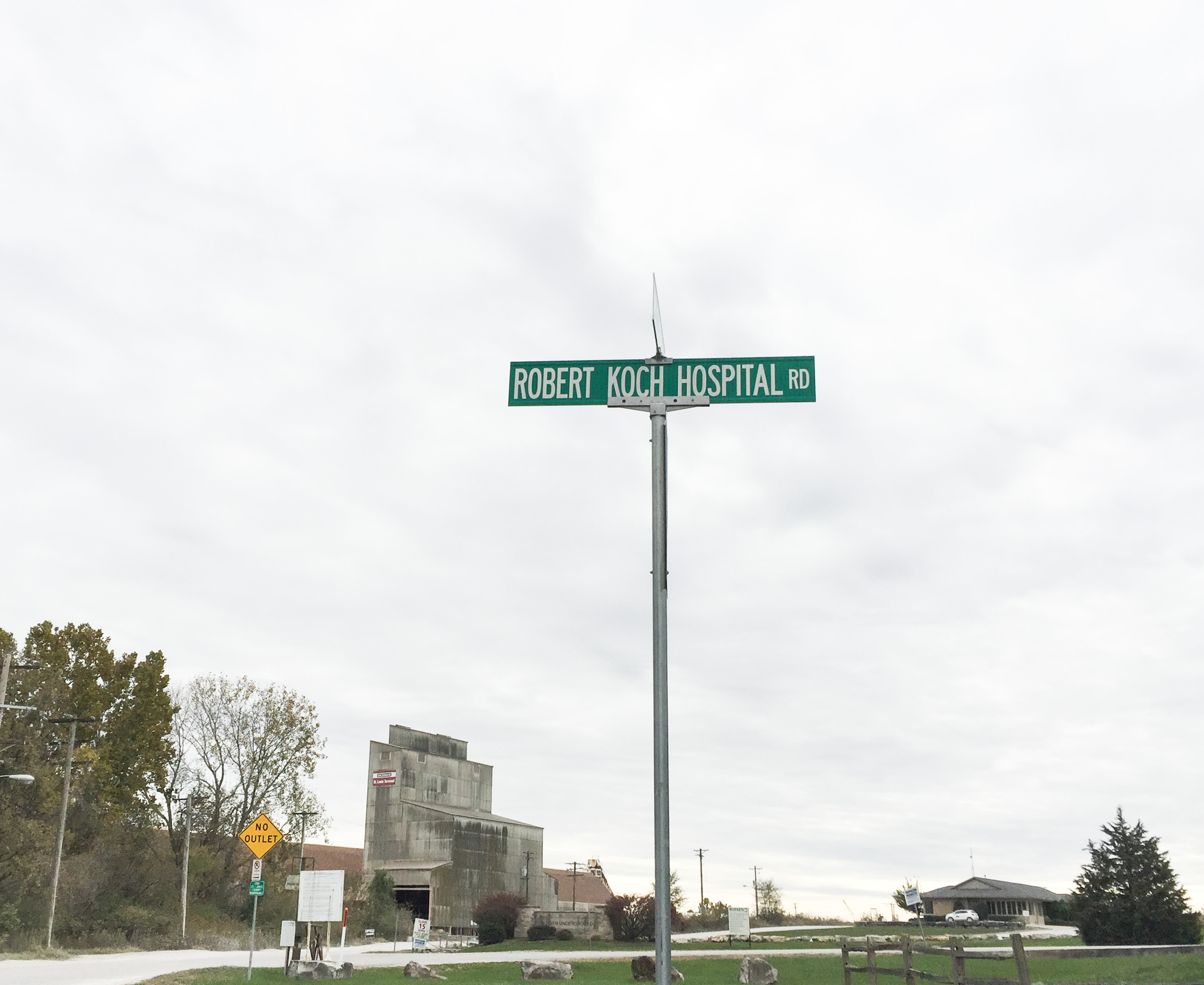
- The intersection of Robert Koch Hospital Road and Koch Road in Oakville, Missouri. Near the previous site of Robert Koch Hospital. Photo taken in 2017.

- Location within Missouri Location within the United States
- Nearest city: Oakville, Missouri
- Built: 1907–1939
- Architect: E.E. Christopher, A.A Osburg
- NRHP reference No.: 84000206
- Added to NRHP: October 31, 1984

Koch is a former community in St. Louis County, Missouri. It was named for Robert Koch, a German bacteriologist. The location was at what is now Interstate 255 east of Route 231. It had a post office, which is now closed.

The Robert Koch Hospital was located just off US 255 before it crosses the Jefferson Barracks Bridge in south county at 4101 Koch Road. The hospital was built by the city of St. Louis, primarily as a quarantine facility for patients with a variety of easily transmissible diseases, including smallpox, yellow fever, and tuberculosis. There is a cemetery located on the grounds of this closed hospital, the building founded in 1875, with its last major renovation in 1949, and was demolished in 1989. The cemetery referred to as "Quarantine Cemetery" is located on the 503 acres (2.04 km^{2}) associated with this hospital. Many people believe this site is haunted. The hospital site was listed on the National Register of Historic Places in 1984.

Nineteen buildings were constructed by 1939, and an 105-acre (0.42 km^{2}) farm, post office, railroad stop, housing, and recreational facilities made the hospital almost self-sustaining. By the end of World War II, new medications decreased the life-threatening effects of tuberculosis; from the 1950s to 1983 the hospital was used as housing for the indigent elderly.

It also houses an antenna site for St. Louis City Emergency Management.

== Location ==
The Geographic Names Information System (GNIS) gives the historical coordinates of the community as 38°28′54″N 90°17′08″W

GNIS further gives the historical location of the hospital as 38°28′57″N 90°17′08″W

GNIS gives the location of the Koch post office as unknown.
