= Jack Carney (baseball) =

American baseball player (1866–1925)

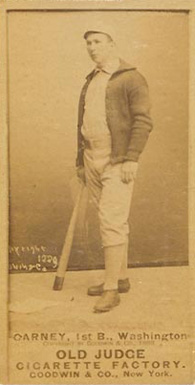
- First baseman
- Born: November 10, 1866; Salem, Massachusetts, U.S.
- Died: October 19, 1925 (aged 58); Litchfield, New Hampshire, U.S.
- Batted: Right Threw: Right

MLB debut
- April 24, 1889, for the Washington Nationals

Last MLB appearance
- October 4, 1891, for the Milwaukee Brewers

MLB statistics
- Batting average: .273
- Home runs: 7
- Runs batted in: 129
- Stats at Baseball Reference

Teams
- Washington Nationals (1889); Buffalo Bisons (1890); Cleveland Infants (1890); Cincinnati Kelly's Killers (1891); Milwaukee Brewers (1891)

John Joseph Carney (November 10, 1866 – October 19, 1925), also known as "Handsome Jack", was an American professional baseball player in the late 19th century. He was born in Salem, Massachusetts, United States in 1866, and made his debut with the Washington Nationals on April 24, 1889. His last game, with the Milwaukee Brewers, was on October 4, 1891, and he died in 1925 in Litchfield, New Hampshire. In his three-year career, he also played with the Buffalo Bisons, the Cincinnati Kelly's Killers, and the Cleveland Infants, and his positions were first base and outfield. Carney's best performance was with the Infants in 1890, with whom he had a batting average of .348.
