= Boston Reds =

The Boston Reds may refer to the following:

- Boston Reds (1890–1891) - Major League Baseball team that played in the Players' League in 1890, and in the American Association in 1891.
- Boston Reds (1884) - Major League Baseball team that played in the Union Association in 1884.
- Boston Reds (minor league) - Minor league baseball team that played in the New England League in 1893.
