= Neil Stynes =

American baseball player (1868–1944)

- Catcher
- Born: December 10, 1868; Arlington, Massachusetts, U.S.
- Died: March 26, 1944 (aged 75); Somerville, Massachusetts, U.S.
- Batted: Right Threw: Right

MLB debut
- September 8, 1890, for the Cleveland Infants

Last MLB appearance
- September 9, 1890, for the Cleveland Infants

MLB statistics
- Games played: 2
- At bats: 8
- Hits: 0
- Stats at Baseball Reference

Teams
- Cleveland Infants (1890)

Cornelius William Stynes (December 10, 1868 – March 26, 1944) was an American Major League Baseball catcher. He played two games for the 1890 Cleveland Infants of the short-lived Players' League. He had zero hits in eight at bats.

At 6 feet tall and 195 pounds - Neil was a right handed thrower and batter and made his 1890s Cleveland Infants debut at age 21.

== Sources ==
- Career statistics from Baseball Reference · Retrosheet · Baseball Almanac
