= Willie McGill =

American baseball player (1873–1944)

- McGill pictured in The Drift 1944, Butler yearbook
- Pitcher
- Born: November 10, 1873; Atlanta, Georgia, U.S.
- Died: August 29, 1944 (aged 70); Indianapolis, Indiana, U.S.
- Batted: unknown Threw: Left

MLB debut
- May 8, 1890, for the Cleveland Infants

Last MLB appearance
- June 12, 1896, for the Philadelphia Phillies

MLB statistics
- Win–loss record: 72–74
- Earned run average: 4.59
- Strikeouts: 510
- Stats at Baseball Reference

Teams
- Cleveland Infants (1890); Cincinnati Kelly's Killers (1891); St. Louis Browns (1891); Cincinnati Reds (1892); Chicago Colts (1893–1894); Philadelphia Phillies (1895–1896)

William Vaness McGill (November 10, 1873 – August 29, 1944) was an American Major League Baseball pitcher. He played professionally for the Cleveland Infants, Cincinnati Kelly's Killers, St. Louis Browns, Cincinnati Reds, Chicago Colts, St. Louis Browns and the Philadelphia Phillies.

== Biography ==
McGill was born in Atlanta and attended the University of Notre Dame. He played his first professional game with the Cleveland Infants on May 8, 1890, at the age of 16, and he remains the youngest player in major league history to start a game, to throw a complete game, and to record a complete game win.

He pitched for seven years, with six different teams. His best year was with the 1891 St. Louis Browns when he had a 19–10 record with a 2.93 ERA. He finished his career with a 4.59 earned run average. He played his last Major League game on June 12, 1896, and would play minor league ball until 1905.

McGill died on August 29, 1944, in Indianapolis, and is interred at Crown Hill Cemetery in Indianapolis in Section 100, Lot 178.
