= Charlie Dewald =

American baseball player (1867–1904)

- Pitcher
- Born: September 22, 1867; Newark, New Jersey, U.S.
- Died: August 22, 1904 (aged 36); Cleveland, Ohio, U.S.
- Batted: unknown Threw: Left

MLB debut
- September 20, 1890, for the Cleveland Infants

Last MLB appearance
- September 25, 1890, for the Cleveland Infants

MLB statistics
- Win–loss record: 2–0
- Earned run average: 0.64
- Strikeouts: 6
- Stats at Baseball Reference

Teams
- Cleveland Infants (1890)

Charles H. Dewald (September 22, 1867 – August 22, 1904), also known as Charlie Dewald and Carl Dewald, was an American pitcher in Major League Baseball for the 1890 Cleveland Infants. His record was 2 wins and 0 losses.

== Life and career ==
Dewald was born on September 22, 1867, in Newark, New Jersey.

After leaving baseball, Dewald was named superintendent of all city cemeteries in Cleveland, Ohio, in April 1899. He resigned the position on May 25, 1903, due to ill health. He died in Cleveland on August 22, 1904, and was buried at Woodland Cemetery.
