= Brotherhood Park =

Baseball ground in Cleveland, Ohio

- Interactive map of Brotherhood Park
- Location: Cleveland, Ohio
- Coordinates: 41°28′59″N 81°38′57″W
- Surface: Grass

Tenant
- Cleveland Infants (PL) (1890)

Brotherhood Park is a former baseball ground located in Cleveland, Ohio. The ground was home to the Cleveland Infants of the Players' League in 1890. According to sources, it stood at Willson (sometimes spelled Wilson) Avenue (now East 55th Street) and the Nickel Plate Railroad tracks.

"Brotherhood Park" was a name given to several of the ballparks used by clubs in the Players' League, perhaps most notably to the Polo Grounds (III) in 1890. Most of those usages disappeared after the league disbanded. The name was used consistently in Cleveland, even after the PL folded. The venue was used for various local sports and other events until it was finally sold to developers in the mid-1890s.

The most recent city directory that states its location is from 1892, as "Willson Avenue at Nickel Plate." A newspaper report on its construction says that right field was a short field adjoining the Nickel Plate tracks. Another report says that it was "near" Woodland [Avenue], which is about half a mile north of the tracks. All the local newspapers are consistent in naming Willson as its most prominent bordering street.
