= Paul Radford =

American baseball player (1861–1945)

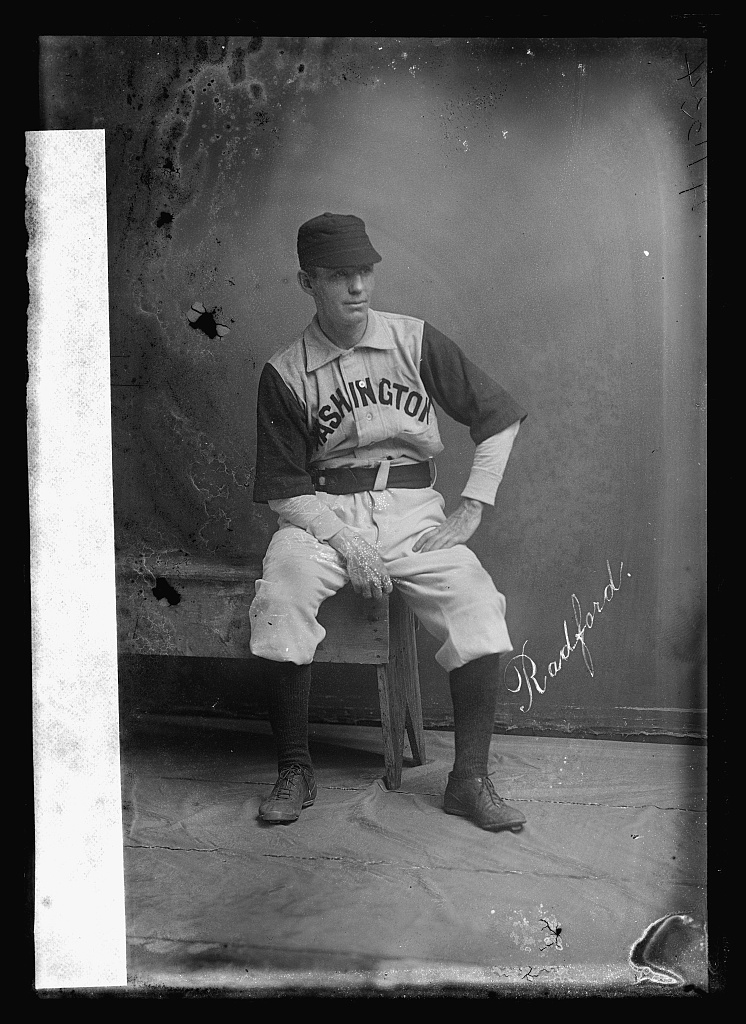
- Radford in Washington Senators uniform
- Outfielder / Shortstop
- Born: October 14, 1861; Roxbury, Massachusetts, U.S.
- Died: February 21, 1945 (aged 83); Boston, Massachusetts, U.S.
- Batted: Right Threw: Right

MLB debut
- May 1, 1883, for the Boston Beaneaters

Last MLB appearance
- September 29, 1894, for the Washington Senators

MLB statistics
- Batting average: .242
- Home runs: 13
- Runs batted in: 462
- Stolen bases: 346
- Stats at Baseball Reference

Teams
- Boston Beaneaters (1883); Providence Grays (1884–1885); Kansas City Cowboys (1886); New York Metropolitans (1887); Brooklyn Bridegrooms (1888); Cleveland Spiders (1889); Cleveland Infants (1890); Boston Reds (1891); Washington Senators (1892–1894)

Paul Revere Radford (October 14, 1861 – February 21, 1945) was an American Major League Baseball player in the late 19th century. Paul, nicknamed "Shorty", played with many teams over his 12-season career. He was a starting outfielder with the Providence Grays club that won the 1884 World Series. His best performance was with the 1887 New York Metropolitans, when he set the major league record with 106 walks and produced an Offensive WAR rating of 3.4 that ranked sixth in the American Association. Radford died in Boston, Massachusetts, at 83.

== Early life ==
Paul Radford was born on October 14, 1861, in Roxbury, Massachusetts, to parents Benjamin and Anna (Hale) Radford. Six of Radford's siblings died in childhood and he was the youngest of four boys to survive until adulthood. In 1865, the Radford family relocated to the town of Hyde Park, where his father was employed as superintendent of construction at the American Tool and Machine Company. Radford grew up in suburban Hyde Park, a streetcar suburb 10 miles southwest of Boston, amid middle-class prosperity in a house on Fairmount Avenue, as his father advanced to general manager at American Tool. Coming from a religious family, Radford believed in the Sabbath and due to his faith, did not do anything on Sundays, save for keeping the day holy. This included not playing baseball.

In 1882, Radford signed on to play with Hyde Park's semi-pro baseball team. It was during that season that Hyde Park played two exhibition games against the Boston Beaneaters. While not impressed with his hitting, Beaneaters management was impressed with the fact that Radford pitched as well, and could be used as a relief pitcher during a time in baseball where the regulars rarely came out of the game, barring injury.

== Pro career ==
Radford made his MLB debut with the Boston Beaneaters on May 1, 1883. Radford had not played in the minor leagues prior to his debut. Radford was a starting outfielder for the Beaneaters that season, sharing the outfield with Charlie Buffinton and Joe Hornung. Just 21 years old, with a handful of semi-pro games on his resume, Radford struggled at the plate, only batting .205. Despite the terrible batting average, manager John Morrill kept Radford in the line-up. He was signed for his ability to come in and pitch if needed, but Radford made no appearances as a pitcher that season.

Radford was released at the end of the season and was claimed off league waivers by the Providence Grays. Just as he'd been the previous season, Radford was a light hitting outfielder who played for a team that won the championship. The Grays defeated the New York Metropolitans of the rival American Association, thus claiming a victory in an early version of the World Series. Radford was viewed as a good luck charm, as Radford always had with him his "lucky horseshoe". Radford had kept the horseshoe with him the previous season in Boston as he had done in Providence. However, that season Providence did not win a championship, and Radford was released.

Since the National League did not play on Sundays, Radford's strict observation of the Sabbath did not hamper his baseball career. However, after one season with the Kansas City Cowboys, Radford signed with the New York Metropolitans of the American Association. The American Association did play on Sundays, causing Radford to come up with clever excuses to miss Sunday games. The rest of Radford's career was spent as a journeyman, never spending more than one season with the same team. He spent the 1890 season with the Cleveland Infants of the ill-fated Players league. The usually light-hitting Radford had one of his best seasons with Cleveland, batting .292 and stealing 25 bases. However, the Players league folded after one season, and Radford was on the move again. He had a homecoming of sorts, playing one season for the Boston Reds of the American Association before joining the Washington Senators of the National league in 1892. The Reds had been a member of the Players League, but they were granted the right to transfer to the American Association, despite objections raised by the National League's Beaneaters. Radford finished his stint in the majors with the Senators. Though he remained a base stealing threat (Radford swiped 65 bases for the Reds in 1891), he struggled at the plate, and never again achieved as high an average as in the players league. After he was released in 1894, Radford finished his career in the minor leagues before retiring in 1897 at age 35 as a member of the Hartford Bluebirds.

In 1895, Radford was a member of the Scranton Coal Heavers of the Eastern League. Radford was released, but not because of his on field performance, it was because the eastern League played ball on Sundays and management demanded that Radford play as well, despite his objections. Despite an official end to his career in 1897, Radford remained in baseball, making occasional one time appearance. He played semi-pro baseball and in 1903, he even played for the Hyde Park team, where his journey had begun some 20 years prior. In 1904, he was in place to make an emergency appearance for the Chicago Cubs. Even though Radford was 43 years old, Cubs manager Frank Selee needed an extra man on the bench because starting shortstop Joe Tinker was injured. Selee had wanted to use Radford over the utility infielder Shad Barry. However, Barry played in the first game of what was supposed to be a double header. Radford and the Cubs were getting ready to take the field when the second contest was called due to rain. After Tinker was able to return, Radford left the Cubs and returned to playing semi-pro baseball, finishing where he started, as Radford played for Hyde Park in 1907 atage 44. Radford enjoyed one more moment on the baseball diamond. In 1922, at the age of 60, Radford played in a charity National League Old-Timers game that was used to raise money for Boston Children's Hospital.

Paul Radford Tobacco Card

== Post career ==
In October 1885, Paul Radford married Mary Blair. After his baseball career was over, and even as he played semi-pro, Radford worked as a machinist and through his baseball career, had made enough money so that he was financially stable enough to buy a home. Radford remained in Hyde Park for the majority of the rest of his life. In 1912, Hyde Park was absorbed into the city of Boston. In January 1930 the Newspaper Enterprise Association produced a syndicated article about Radford and his lucky horseshoe, since the Boston Red Sox were interested in its whereabouts. The horseshoe hadn’t been seen since 1894 when the South End Grounds burned down.

On February 21, 1945, Paul Radford died at his home.

== See also ==
- List of Major League Baseball career stolen bases leaders
