= Jay Budd =

American baseball player (1865–1923)

- Left fielder
- Born: December 4, 1865; Groton, Ohio, U.S.
- Died: August 22, 1923 (aged 57); Cleveland, Ohio, U.S.
- Batted: Unknown Threw: Unknown

MLB debut
- September 10, 1890, for the Cleveland Infants

Last MLB appearance
- September 10, 1890, for the Cleveland Infants

MLB statistics
- Batting average: .000
- At bats: 4
- Strikeouts: 3
- Stats at Baseball Reference

Teams
- Cleveland Infants (1890)

Jay Cook Budd (December 4, 1865 - August 22, 1923) was an American professional baseball player. He played one game as a left fielder in Major League Baseball in 1890 for the Cleveland Infants of the short-lived Players' League.
