= Cleveland Infants =

Information
- League: Players' League (1890)
- Location: Cleveland, Ohio
- Ballpark: Brotherhood Park (1890)
- Founded: 1890
- Folded: 1890
- Colors: Navy, pink
- Ownership: Al Johnson
- Manager: Henry Larkin & Patsy Tebeau

The Cleveland Infants were a one-year baseball team in the Players' League, a short-lived Major League that existed only for the 1890 season. Owned by Al Johnson, the Infants finished 1890, their lone season, with 55 wins and 75 losses. Their home games were played at Brotherhood Park.

The team included future Baseball Hall of Famer Ed Delahanty, and the league's batting champion, Pete Browning.

== The team ==
The Infants featured star hitter Pete Browning. Browning had defected to the Players' League from the American Association's Louisville Colonels, who had finished the 1889 season with a 27–111 win–loss record. Browning hit for a .373 batting average in 1890, leading the Players' League. He also led the league in doubles. At one point during the season, he was running the bases and broke up a no-hitter by pitcher Ad Gumbert in the ninth inning of a game. With two outs, Browning was on first base after being hit by a pitch. The batter hit a ground ball and Browning let the ball hit his foot, rendering himself out but crediting the batter with a hit under the rules of that era.

== Roster ==
1890 Cleveland Infants
Roster
Pitchers: Jersey Bakely; Charlie Dewald; Bill Gleason; Henry Gruber; George Hemming; Willie McGill; Cinders O'Brien	Catchers: Jack Brennan; Pop Snyder; Neil Stynes; Sy Sutcliffe; Infielders: Ed Delahanty; Henry Larkin; Cub Stricker; Patsy Tebeau	Outfielders: Jay Budd; Pete Browning; Jack Carney; Jimmy McAleer; Paul Radford; Larry Twitchell	Manager: Henry Larkin; Patsy Tebeau

== See also ==
- 1890 Cleveland Infants season
