= Ed Beatin =

American baseball player (1866–1925)

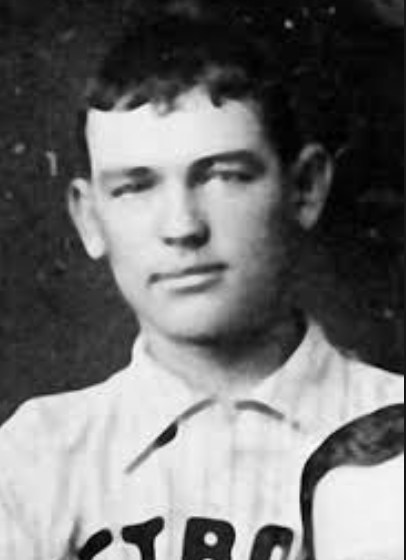
- Beatin, c. 1888
- Pitcher
- Born: August 10, 1866; Baltimore, Maryland, US
- Died: May 9, 1925 (aged 58); Baltimore, Maryland, US
- Batted: Right Threw: Left

MLB debut
- August 2, 1887, for the Detroit Wolverines

Last MLB appearance
- September 14, 1891, for the Cleveland Spiders

MLB statistics
- Win–loss record: 48-56
- Earned run average: 3.68
- Strikeouts: 335
- Stats at Baseball Reference

Teams
- Detroit Wolverines (1887–1888); Cleveland Spiders (1889–1891)

Ebenezer Ambrose "Ed" Beatin (August 10, 1866 – May 9, 1925) was an American professional baseball player. He played five seasons in Major League Baseball as a left-handed pitcher for the Detroit Wolverines from 1887 to 1888 and the Cleveland Spiders from 1889 to 1891. A 20-game winner in both 1889 and 1890, Beatin was known for having the best "slow ball" in the game. He was also a member of the 1887 Detroit Wolverines team that won the National League pennant.

== Early years ==
Beatin was born in Baltimore, Maryland in 1866. He began his professional baseball career at age 20 with the Allentown Peanut Eaters in the Pennsylvania State Association. He appeared in 25 games for Allentown, threw 22 complete games, and compiled a 19–5 record with a 1.37 earned run average (ERA).

== Major league player ==
=== "The Beatin Case" ===
After his strong showing at Allentown, a dispute arose between three National League clubs (Detroit Wolverines, Cincinnati Red Stockings, and Indianapolis Hoosiers) over which had the rights to Beatin. The Indianapolis club claimed it had struck a deal with the Allentown club for Beatin's services in early July, and Detroit and Cincinnati both claimed to have struck deals for Beatin and catcher Tom Kinslow in late July. The dispute, referred to as "The Beatin Case", became front page material in the Sporting Life throughout the month of August 1887.

Indianapolis manager Horace Fogel accused both Beatin and the Allentown directorate of having acted "very dishonorably" in the matter and suggested that "this Allentown youth is deserving of the blacklist." In the end, only Cincinnati and Detroit pressed their claims at a hearing before baseball's Board of Arbitration. Detroit president Frederick K. Stearns testified and produced telegrams showing that he had closed deals with Beatin and Kinslow on July 20, seven days before Cincinnati claimed to have signed them. Detroit thus established priority to the players, and the Sporting Life described Cincinnati's case as having "proved decidedly weak." The Board issued its ruling in September 1887, finding in favor of Detroit.

=== The "slow ball" ===
Beatin's best pitch was his "slow ball." A report published in The Sporting Life stated: "His slow ball has never been equaled by any pitcher living, it would set such batters as Delehanty, Beckley and Anson perfectly wild, and the little cuss would use it with the bases chock full and a heavy hitter at bat. I should expect my release if I lobbed a slow one at such times, but Beatin's teaser was the best thing in his repertoire." Another account, published in 1910, stated that Beatin threw his slow pitch with "the nerve of a wrestling promoter" and added: "Beatin had the most deliberate slow ball that ever wearied its way toward a plate. Cy Young, Mathewson, Ed Walsh, Mordecai Brown, Addie Joss or any of the artists would gladly separate from $5000 for a loaf ball like Beatin's. The batter never knew when Beatin wound up whether the ball would come like [aviator] Johnny Moisant or an A.D.T. [messenger] boy."

Teammate Ed McKean in 1905 opined that Beatin "had the most astonishing slow ball that was ever offered up to a batter." McKean recounted a story of Harry Stovey coming to bat against Beatin in the ninth inning of a game and being so confused by Beatin's slow ball that he swung once and missed, then swung again and hit the ball for what appeared to be a game-winning hit. However, the umpire ruled that the first swing counted as the third strike and an out. When Stovey protested, the umpire replied, "there is no rule allowing you two strikes at the same ball. You were out a full second before you made that hit!"

=== Detroit Wolverines ===
Beatin pitched a four-hit complete game in his major league debut for Detroit on August 2, 1887, as the Wolverines beat Philadelphia by a score of 10–3. The headline for the game coverage in the Detroit Free Press read: "A GOOD BEATIN: Both Detroit and Philadelphia in Possession of One." Beatin pitched in only one other game for Detroit in 1887 and concluded his first major league season with a 1–1 record and a 4.00 ERA.

During the 1888 season, Beatin appeared in 12 games for Detroit, all complete games. He compiled a 5–7 record and a 2.86 ERA. The team finished in fifth place with a 68–63 record. With high salaries owed to the team's star players, and gate receipts declining markedly, the team folded in October 1888 with the players being sold to other teams. Beatin was sold to the Cleveland Spiders along with three other players, including Larry Twitchell.

=== Cleveland Spiders ===
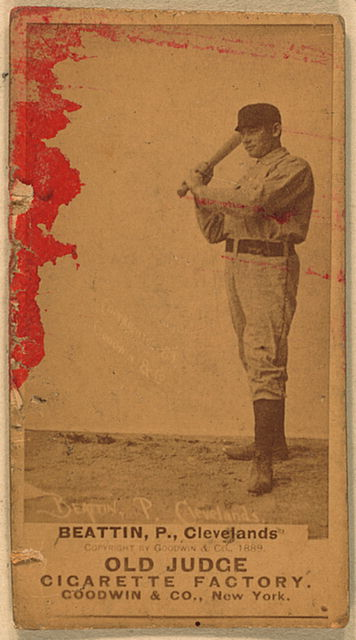
Old Judge baseball card of Beatin

In 1889, Beatin had the best season in his major league career. Despite playing for a sixth place team with a losing record, Beatin threw 35 complete games and compiled a 20–15 record. He ranked among the National League's pitching leaders with three shutouts (3rd), a Wins Above Replacement rating of 5.7 (6th), 126 strikeouts (8th), 20 wins (9th), and a 3.57 ERA (9th).

In 1890, Beatin was the Spiders' top pitcher despite competition from rookie Cy Young. Beatin started 54 games in 1890 and threw 53 complete games, ranking fourth in the National League in both categories. On the other hand, he also led the league in hits (518) and earned runs (202) allowed. His win–loss record of 22–30 was hampered by the performance of a team that finished in seventh place with a 44–88 record.

In 1891, Cy Young emerged as Cleveland's pitching ace, and Beatin sustained arm troubles, spending a portion of the season seeking treatment in Mount Clemens, Michigan. In all, Beatin started only four games for Cleveland in 1891. He compiled an 0–3 record as his ERA jumped to 5.28. He appeared in his final major league game on September 28, 1891.

== Later years ==
Beatin died in Baltimore in 1925 at age 58. He was buried at Oak Lawn Cemetery in Baltimore.

Beatin was one of only two Major League Baseball players with the given name of Ebenezer. The other was second baseman, Abbie Johnson. Both went by names other than Ebenezer. (In addition to Beatin and Johnson, third baseman Joe Graves had the middle name, Ebenezer.)
