= George Hemming =

American baseball player (1868–1930)

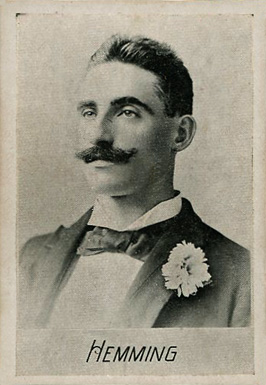
- Pitcher
- Born: December 15, 1868; Carrollton, Ohio, U.S.
- Died: June 3, 1930 (aged 61); Springfield, Massachusetts, U.S.
- Batted: Right Threw: Right

MLB debut
- April 21, 1890, for the Cleveland Infants

Last MLB appearance
- June 12, 1897, for the Louisville Colonels

MLB statistics
- Win–loss record: 91–82
- Earned run average: 4.53
- Strikeouts: 362
- Stats at Baseball Reference

Teams
- Cleveland Infants (1890); Brooklyn Ward's Wonders (1890); Brooklyn Grooms (1891); Cincinnati Reds (1892); Louisville Colonels (1892–1894); Baltimore Orioles (1894–1896); Louisville Colonels (1897)

Career highlights and awards
- 3× National League pennant (1894–1896)

George Hemming (December 15, 1868 – June 3, 1930), also known as Old Wax Figger, was an American pitcher in Major League baseball in the late 19th century. His first season was with the Cleveland Infants, most likely because his hometown, Carrollton was nearby. However, his career soon left Cleveland and went to teams such as the Brooklyn Grooms, Cincinnati Reds, Louisville Colonels and Baltimore Orioles. His best performance was with the 1895 Orioles, when he posted career highs in wins (20) and E.R.A. (4.05)

== See also ==
- List of Major League Baseball annual saves leaders

== Sources ==
- George Hemming Baseball-Reference.com

Preceded by Bob Caruthers	Brooklyn Grooms; Opening Day; Starting pitcher 1891	Succeeded by Dave Foutz
