= Henry Larkin =

American baseball player (1860–1942)

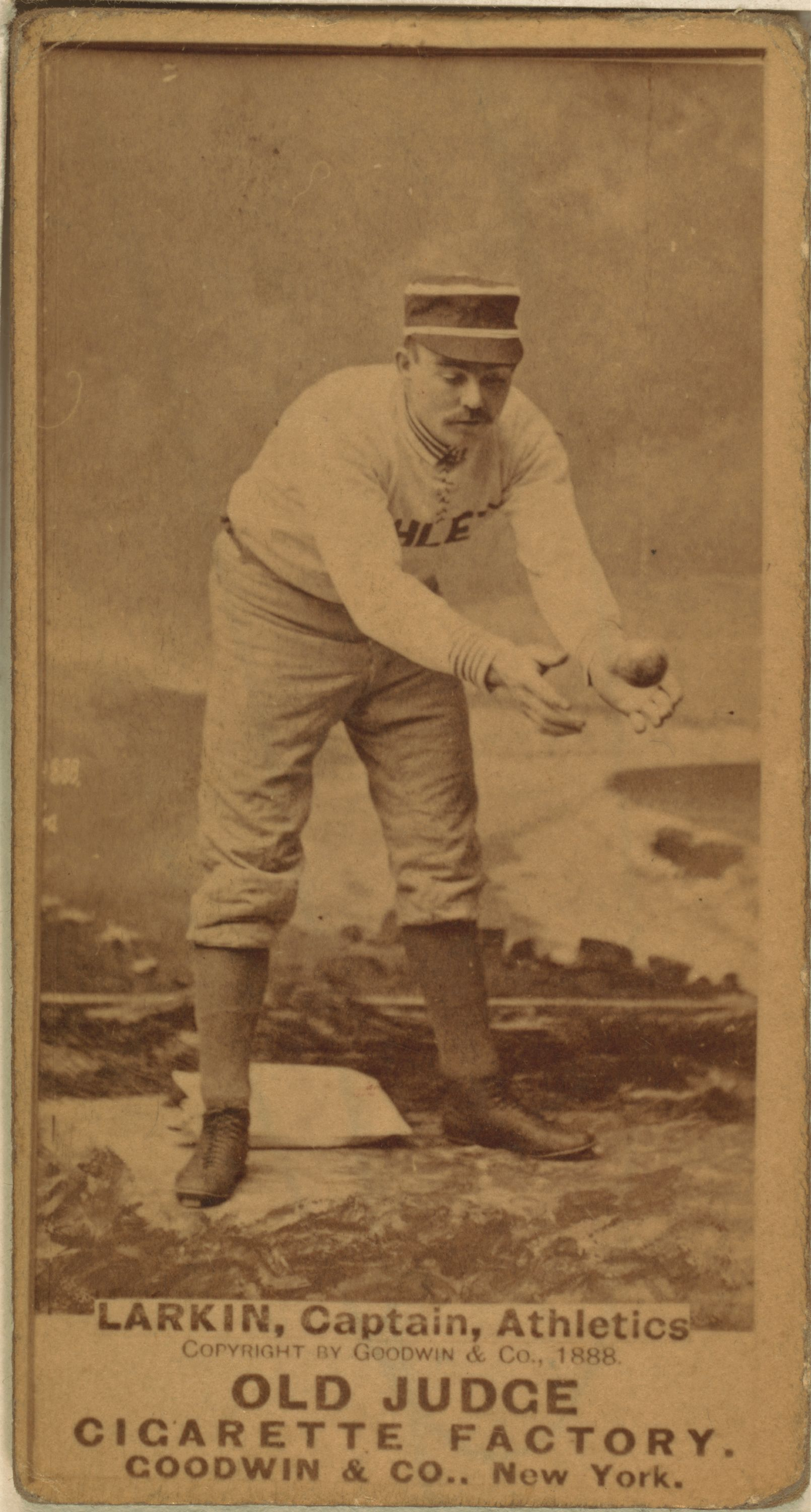
- First baseman/Outfielder
- Born: January 12, 1860; Reading, Pennsylvania, US
- Died: January 31, 1942 (aged 82); Reading, Pennsylvania, US
- Batted: Right Threw: Right

MLB debut
- May 1, 1884, for the Philadelphia Athletics

Last MLB appearance
- August 4, 1893, for the Washington Senators

MLB statistics
- Batting average: .303
- Hits: 1,425
- Runs: 925
- Stats at Baseball Reference

Teams
- As player: Philadelphia Athletics (1884–1889); Cleveland Infants (1890); Philadelphia Athletics (1891); Washington Senators (1892–1893); As manager: Cleveland Infants (1890)

Henry E. Larkin (January 12, 1860 – January 31, 1942) was an American professional baseball player who played Major League Baseball for 10 seasons (1883–1893).

At age 24, Larkin started his career with the Philadelphia Athletics in 1884. On June 16, 1885, he hit for the cycle. That same year in a single game he recorded four doubles, still a major league record that has been tied many times, but never broken. He played six years with the club, usually hitting above .300. His 7th season he switched leagues to the Players' League, and was the Cleveland Infants' star first baseman, hitting .330 and knocking in 112 RBI. He also managed the club in 1890. When the league disbanded, he returned to Philadelphia, and later finished his career with the Washington Senators. He averaged a .303 batting average for his career. Unlike other power hitters of his era, Larkin hit more of his home runs on the road than at home – 35 versus 18.

== See also ==
- List of Major League Baseball annual doubles leaders
- List of Major League Baseball career triples leaders
- List of Major League Baseball player-managers
- List of Major League Baseball single-game hits leaders
- List of Major League Baseball players to hit for the cycle

Achievements
| Preceded by George Wood | Hitting for the cycle June 16, 1885 | Succeeded by Mox McQuery |
