= List of baseball parks in Philadelphia =

This is a list of venues used for professional baseball in Philadelphia. The information is a synthesis of the information contained in the references listed.

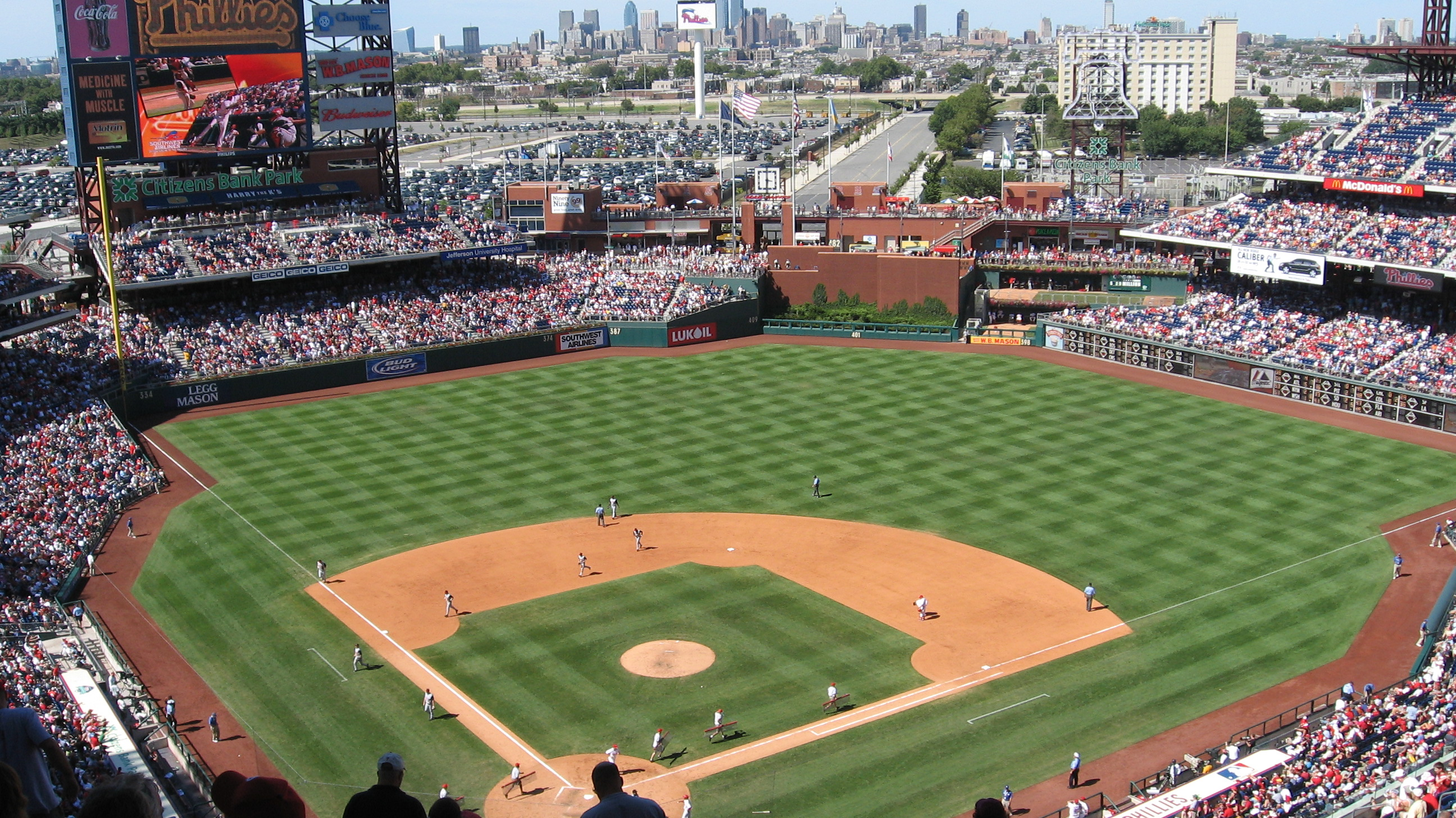
Citizens Bank Park

Veterans Stadium

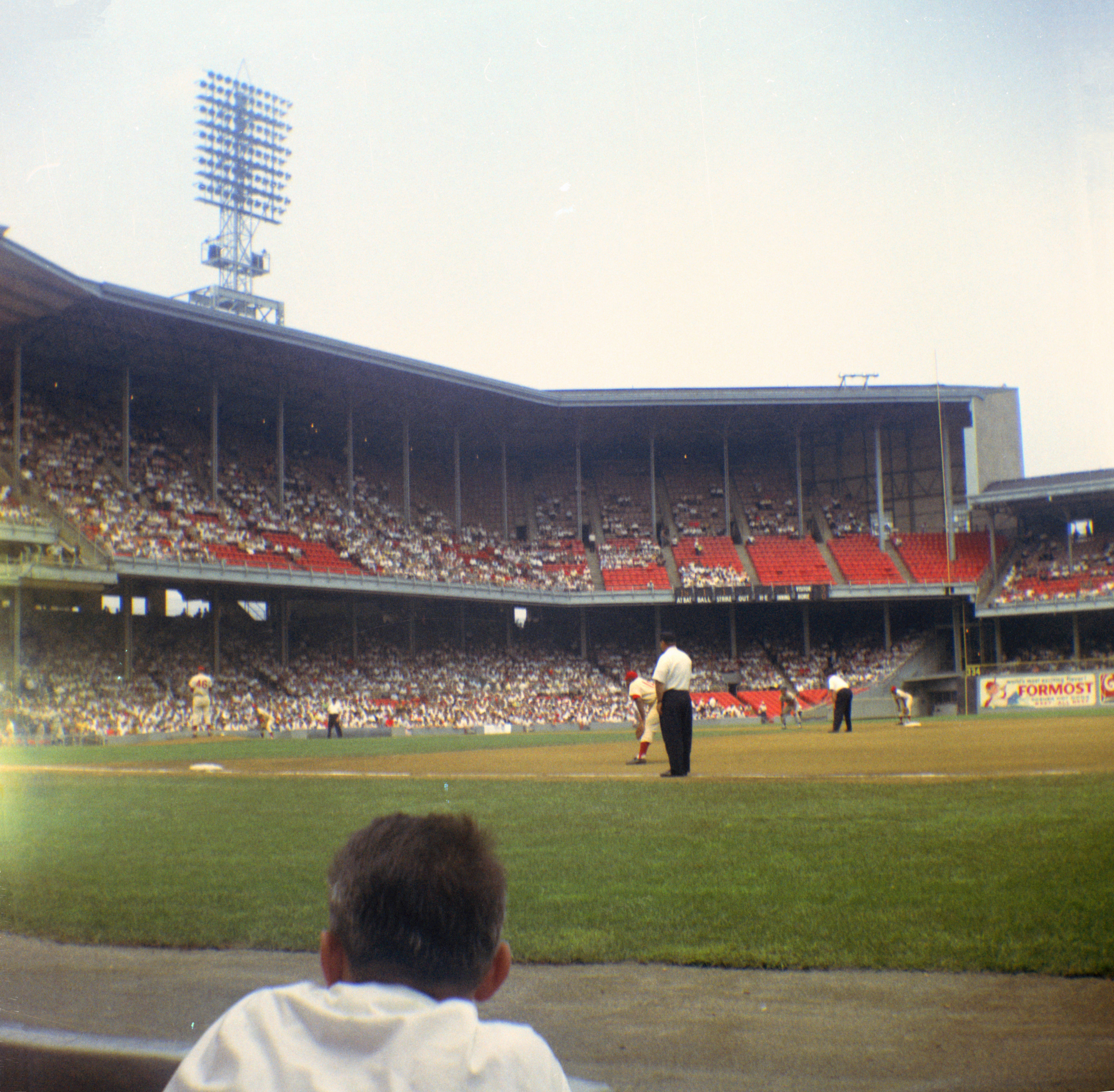
Shibe Park a.k.a. Connie Mack Stadium

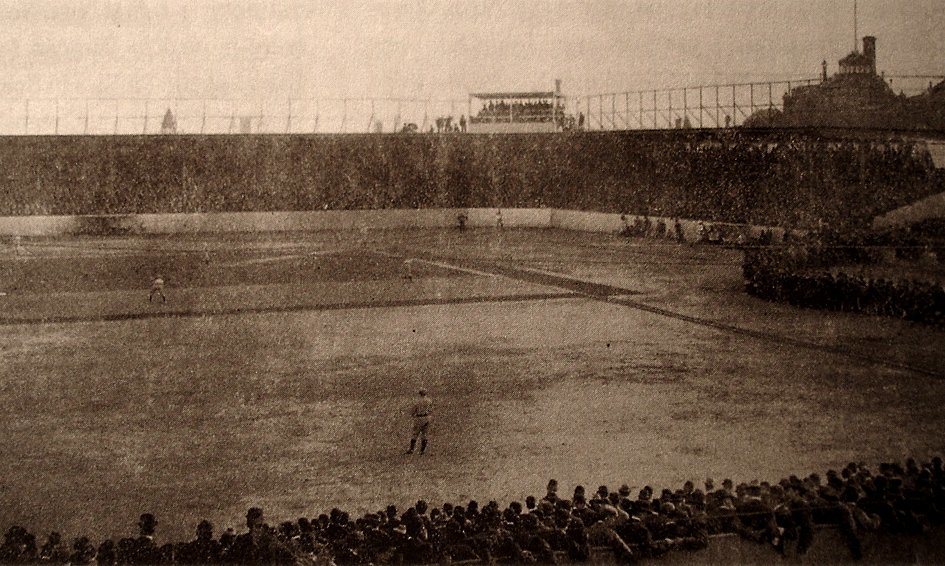
Columbia Park

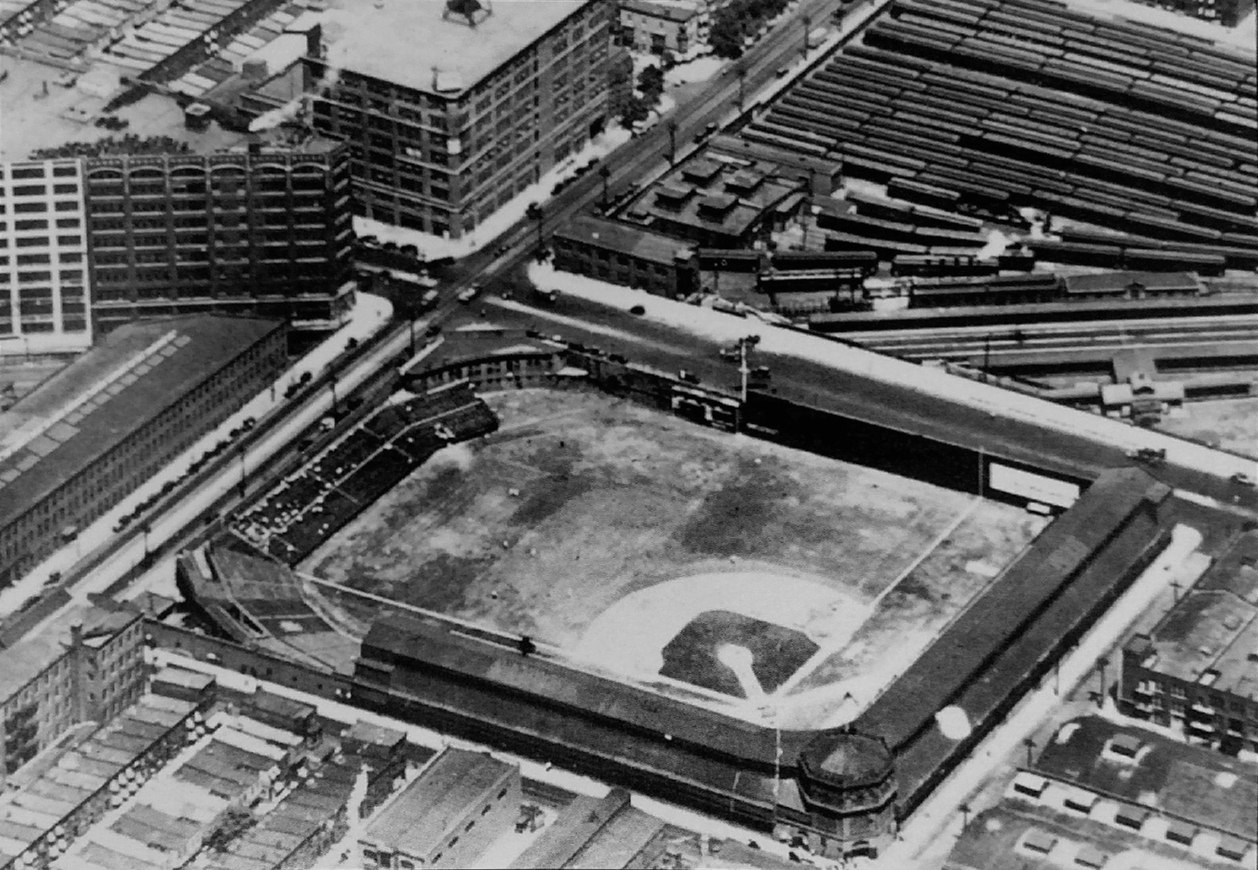
National League Park

Athletic(s) grounds or "the grounds at 15th and Columbia"
Home of: Athletic 1860s–1870 (amateur/professional)

Site of several celebrated matches between the Athletics and the Atlantics of Brooklyn, on Oct 30, 1865; and on Oct 1 and 22, 1866

Location: Columbia Avenue (now Cecil B. Moore Avenue) (south, right field); North 15th Street (east, left field); Montgomery Street (north, third base); North 17th Street and Wagner Free Institute of Science (west, first base)
Currently: part of the Temple University campus; residential; police station

Jefferson Street Grounds a.k.a. Jefferson Park a.k.a. Athletics Park
Home of:

Amateur clubs, including Olympic, beginning 1864
Athletic – NA (1871–1875), NL (1876)
Philadelphia White Stockings – NA (1873–1875)
Athletic – League Alliance (1877)
Athletic – AA (1883–1890)
Also used as a neutral site for one game in the 1887 World Series

Location: Jefferson Street (north); North 25th Street (east); Master Street (south); North 27th Street (west)

1860s-1870s orientation: 25th (first base); Master (third base); Jefferson (right field)
1880s-1890s orientation: 27th (first base); Jefferson (third base); 26th (left field)

Currently: Residential / commercial / elementary School / Athletic Recreation Center

Recreation Park / Centennial Park
Home of:

Philadelphia Centennials – NA (1875)
Philadelphia Phillies – League Alliance (1882)
Philadelphia Phillies – NL (1883–1886)

Location: Columbia Avenue (now Cecil B. Moore Avenue) (south, third base); 25th Street (west, left field); Montgomery Street (north, center field); Ridge Avenue a.k.a. Ridge Pike (northeast, right field); 24th Street (east, first base) – a few blocks east of the future Columbia Park site
Currently: Residential

Oakdale Park
Home of:

Amateur clubs beginning about 1866
Athletic – AA (1882)

Location: West Kensington – West Huntingdon Street (north); North 11th Street (east); West Cumberland Street (south); North 12th Street (west) – a couple of blocks east of the future Baker Bowl site
Currently: Residential / commercial

Keystone Park
Home of: Keystone – UA (1884)
Location: South Broad Street (east, left field); Moore Street (north, third base); Mifflin Street (south, right field); South 15th Street (west, first base)
Currently: Residential / commercial

Baker Bowl (formally National League Park, originally Philadelphia Base Ball Park)
Home of:

Philadelphia Phillies – NL (1887–June 1938)
Also used as a neutral site for one game in the 1887 World Series and one game in the 1888 World Series
Philadelphia Athletics Eastern League (1892 - part-season)

Location: West Lehigh Avenue (north, left field); North Broad Street (east, right field); West Huntingdon Street (south, first base); North 15th Street (west, third base)
Currently: Commercial

University Athletic Grounds
Home of: Philadelphia Phillies – NL (1894 for 6 games)
Location: "37th and Spruce" – Spruce Street (north), South 38th Street (east), Pine Street (south), Woodland Avenue and South 37th Street T-intersection (northwest) – normally the home of University of Pennsylvania teams, prior to the opening of Franklin Field a few blocks east
Currently: campus buildings and park

Forepaugh Park
Home of: Athletic – PL (1890), AA (1891)
Location: North Broad Street (west, third base); West Dauphin Street (south, first base); North 13th Street (east, right field); West York Street (north, left field) – a few blocks south of the Baker Bowl and Oakdale Park sites
Currently: Residential / commercial

Columbia Park or Columbia Avenue Grounds
Home of: Philadelphia Athletics – AL (1901–1908)
Location: Columbia Avenue (now Cecil B. Moore Avenue) (north, left field); North 29th Street (east, right field); West Oxford Street (south, first base); North 30th Street (west, third base); Glenwood Avenue (northwest, left field corner), beyond Columbia-30th intersection
Currently: Residential

Shibe Park / Connie Mack Stadium
Home of:

Philadelphia Athletics – AL (1909–1954)
Philadelphia Phillies – NL (June1938–1970)

Location: West Lehigh Avenue (south, first base); North 21st Street (west, third base); West Somerset Street (north, left field); North 20th Street (east, right field) – a few blocks west of Baker Bowl
Currently: Deliverance Evangelistic Church

Hilldale Park
Home of: Hilldale – Negro leagues (ca. 1910–1932)
Location: Darby, Pennsylvania – buildings and Cedar Avenue (southwest, third base); Chester Avenue (southeast, first base); Bunting Lane (now North MacDade Boulevard) (northwest, left and center fields); Holy Cross Cemetery (northeast, right field)
Currently: Residential / commercial / athletic fields

Passon Field
Home of:

Philadelphia Bacharach Giants (ca. 1932-1934)
Philadelphia Stars (ca. 1934-1935)

Location: Northwest corner of 48th Street and Spruce Street
Currently: Football field for West Philadelphia High School

44th and Parkside Ballpark
Home of: Philadelphia Stars (ca. 1935–1950)
Location: Belmont Avenue (east); Parkside Avenue North (north)
Currently: Discovery Charter School and Philadelphia Stars Negro League Memorial Park

Veterans Stadium
Home of: Philadelphia Phillies – NL (1971–2003)
Location: 3501 South Broad Street (west, third base); South 10th Street (east, right field); Pattison Avenue (south, first base); Geary Street (north, left field)
Currently: Parking lot just west of Citizens Bank Park

Citizens Bank Park
Home of: Philadelphia Phillies – NL (2004–present)
Location: 1 Citizens Bank Way – Pattison Avenue (south, home base); South 11th Street (west, third base / left field); Hartranft and South 10th Street (north, center field); South Darian Street (east, first base / right field)

== See also ==
- Lists of baseball parks

== Sources ==
- Peter Filichia, Professional Baseball Franchises, Facts on File, 1993.
- Phil Lowry, Green Cathedrals, several editions.
- Michael Benson, Ballparks of North America, McFarland, 1989.
- Rich Westcott, Philadelphia's Old Ballparks, Temple University Press, 1996.
- Baseball Memories, by Marc Okkonen, Sterling Publishing, 1992.
