= List of Baltimore Orioles (1882–1899) Opening Day starting pitchers =

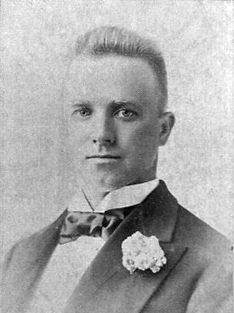
Sadie McMahon was the Orioles' Opening Day starting pitcher five times.

The Baltimore Orioles were a Major League Baseball team that was based in Baltimore, Maryland and played from 1882 through 1899. They played in the American Association from 1882 through 1891 and in the National League from 1892 through 1899. The Orioles used 10 Opening Day starting pitchers in their 18 years as a Major League Baseball franchise. The first game of the new baseball season for a team is played on Opening Day, and being named the Opening Day starter is an honor, which is often given to the player who is expected to lead the pitching staff that season, though there are various strategic reasons why a team's best pitcher might not start on Opening Day. The Orioles had a record of 10 wins and 8 losses in their Opening Day games.

The first game in Orioles' history was played on May 2, 1882 against the Philadelphia Athletics at Oakdale Park in Philadelphia. Tricky Nichols was the Orioles' Opening Day starting pitcher for that game, which the Orioles lost by a score of 10–7. The team's first game as a member of the National League was played on April 12, 1892 against the Brooklyn Bridegrooms at Union Park in Baltimore. Sadie McMahon was the Orioles' Opening Day starting pitcher in a game the Orioles lost be a score of 13–3. The last Opening Day game in Orioles' history was played on April 15, 1899 against the New York Giants at Union Park. Frank Kitson was the Orioles' Opening Day starting pitcher and the Orioles won by a score of 5–3.

Three pitchers made multiple Opening Day starts for the Orioles. McMahon made the most Opening Day starts for the team, five, including four consecutive Opening Day starts from 1891 through 1894. Matt Kilroy was the Orioles' Opening Day starting pitcher four times, every year from 1886 to 1889. Hardie Henderson made two Opening Day starts for the Orioles, in 1884 and 1885.

The Orioles won the National League championship three times, in 1894, 1895 and 1896. McMahon was the Orioles' Opening Day starting pitcher in two of those championship seasons, in 1894 and 1896. Duke Esper was the Orioles' Opening Day starting pitcher in 1895.

== Key ==
Season	Each year is linked to an article about that particular Orioles season.
W	Win
L	Loss
T	Tie game
ND (W)	No decision by starting pitcher; Orioles won game
ND (L)	No decision by starting pitcher; Orioles lost game
(W)	Orioles won game; no information on starting pitcher's decision
(L)	Orioles lost game; no information on starting pitcher's decision
Final score	Game score with Orioles runs listed first
Location	Stadium in italics for home game
(#)	Number of appearances as Opening Day starter with the Orioles
**	Orioles were National League Champions

== Pitchers ==
Matt Kilroy made four Opening Day starts for the Orioles.

Season	Pitcher	Decision	Final Score	Opponent	Location (Stadium)	References
1882	Tricky Nichols	(L)	7–10	Philadelphia Athletics	Oakdale Park	
1883	John Fox	(W)	4–3	New York Metropolitans	Oriole Park	
1884	Hardie Henderson	(W)	5–3	New York Metropolitans	Oriole Park	
1885	Hardie Henderson (2)	(L)	3–7	Brooklyn Trolley Dodgers	Oriole Park	
1886	Matt Kilroy	(W)	4–1	Brooklyn Trolley Dodgers	Oriole Park	
1887	Matt Kilroy (2)	(W)	8–3	Philadelphia Athletics	Oriole Park	
1888	Matt Kilroy (3)	(W)	5–4	Philadelphia Athletics	Jefferson Street Grounds	
1889	Matt Kilroy (4)	(L)	3–13	Columbus Solons	Oriole Park	
1890	Les German	(L)	10–11	St. Louis Browns	Oriole Park	
1891	Sadie McMahon	(W)	11–7	Boston Beaneaters	Oriole Park	
1892	Sadie McMahon (2)	(L)	3–13	Brooklyn Bridegrooms	Union Park	
1893	Sadie McMahon (3)	(L)	5–7	Washington Senators	Boundary Field	
1894**	Sadie McMahon (4)	(W)	8–3	New York Giants	Union Park	
1895**	Duke Esper	(L)	6–7	Philadelphia Phillies	Union Park	
1896**	Sadie McMahon (5)	(L)	5–6	Brooklyn Bridegrooms	Union Park	
1897	Bill Hoffer	(W)	10–5	Boston Beaneaters	Union Park	
1898	Doc McJames	(W)	8–3	Washington Senators	Union Park	
1899	Frank Kitson	(W)	5–3	New York Giants	Union Park	
