= Athletic Ground =

Athletic Ground or Athletic Grounds may refer to:

- a sports ground

== Ireland ==
- Athletic Grounds (Armagh), Gaelic Athletic Association stadium in Armagh, Northern Ireland.
- Cork Athletic Grounds the home Cork GAA until 1974 now called Páirc Uí Chaoimh.
- Athletic Grounds (Dundalk), the home of Dundalk GAA now called Páirc Chaoimhín Naofa.

== England ==
- Athletic Ground (Scarborough), demolished football stadium formerly known as the McCain Stadium in Scarborough, England.
- The Athletic Grounds (Isle of Dogs), the third and now demolished stadia of Millwall Football Club in East London, England.
- Athletic Ground, Richmond, stadium in Richmond, England
- Athletic Ground (Aberdare), demolished stadium in Aberdare, Wales
- Athletic Ground (Cobridge), demolished stadium in Stoke-on-Trent, England
- Athletic Ground (Loughborough), demolished stadium in Loughborough, England
- Athletic Grounds (Blackpool), demolished ground in Blackpool, England, also known as Stanley Park
- Athletic Grounds, Rochdale, demolished stadium in Rochdale, Greater Manchester, England

== United States of America ==
- Athletic Grounds, Philadelphia, a baseball park of the 1860s

== See also ==
- Stadium
- Arena
