= Black Saturday (1903) =

Fatal baseball stadium collapse in Philadelphia, Pennsylvania

Coordinates: 39.993°N 75.156°W

Black Saturday was a 1903 disaster which left 12 spectators dead and injured 232 when a section of balcony collapsed during a baseball game between the Boston Braves and Philadelphia Phillies. It was the worst disaster in the history of American sports spectating.

== National League Park ==
National League Park (also known as Baker Bowl), was built in 1895 using novel construction techniques, prominently featuring a cantilever design to support the roof and upper decks. The modernized building also heavily utilized fire resistant materials like steel and brick, in order to avoid destructive fires like the one that had ravaged the Phillies' previous stadium, the mainly wood-constructed Philadelphia Base Ball Park, in 1894.

== The disaster ==
On August 8, 1903, during a double-header between the Phillies and the Braves, two drunken men walking along 15th street adjacent to the park were being teased by a group of children. One of the men allegedly grabbed by the hair a thirteen-year-old girl named Maggie Barry from the group of children, and after a brief struggle, fell on top of her. Accounts of the incident say that cries for help from the girl and her friends drew attention from spectators in the stadium above, and approximately 300 people crowded the balcony above the street to get a view of the commotion. Under the weight of the curious onlookers, the overloaded balcony's supports apparently became detached from their connections at the wall, and plunged approximately 30 feet (9 m) to the street below.
