= Oakdale Park =

American baseball park

- Interactive map of Oakdale Park
- Location: Philadelphia, Pennsylvania
- Coordinates: 39°59′33″N 75°09′01″W
- Capacity: 1,500 (1882)
- Surface: Natural grass

Construction
- Opened: May 2, 1882 (first AA game)
- Closed: September 21, 1882 (last AA game); 1883

Tenants
- Olympic Ball Club of Philadelphia (1877–1881); Athletic (ECA) (1881); Philadelphia Athletics (AA) (1882)

Oakdale Park was a former baseball park located in Philadelphia, Pennsylvania. It was bounded by Huntingdon Street (north), 11th Street (east), Cumberland Street (south), and 12th Street (west) in the city's West Kensington neighborhood. The Athletic Base Ball Club played their 1882 Eastern Championship Association season and then its 1883 American Association season at the park.

== History ==
The site of the park had been used for amateur baseball since the Civil War. It was used from 1877 to 1881 by the Olympic Ball Club of Philadelphia.

In December 1881, Athletic announced that the club would make improvements to Oakdale Park including the construction of a new grandstand to seat one thousand fans.

Athletic played their first season in the American Association in 1882 at the field. The Athletics played 39 regular-season games at the park, compiling a 21–18 record. On October 10, 1882, Athletic played an exhibition game against the amateur Foote and Mutual Clubs in which the two amateur teams fielded 18 players in the field. Athletic won the game 11 to 0.

The franchise relocated to Jefferson Street Grounds in 1883.

The ball park continued to be in use in 1883. Amateur teams utilized the ball field. 3,000 fans saw the Young Ladies' Base Ball Club play on August 29, 1883.

Oakdale Park was sold shortly thereafter and torn down. Philadelphia Ball Park would be built four blocks west of this site, across Broad Street, in 1887.
