= Recreation Park (Philadelphia) =

Former baseball park in Pennsylvania (1860-1887)

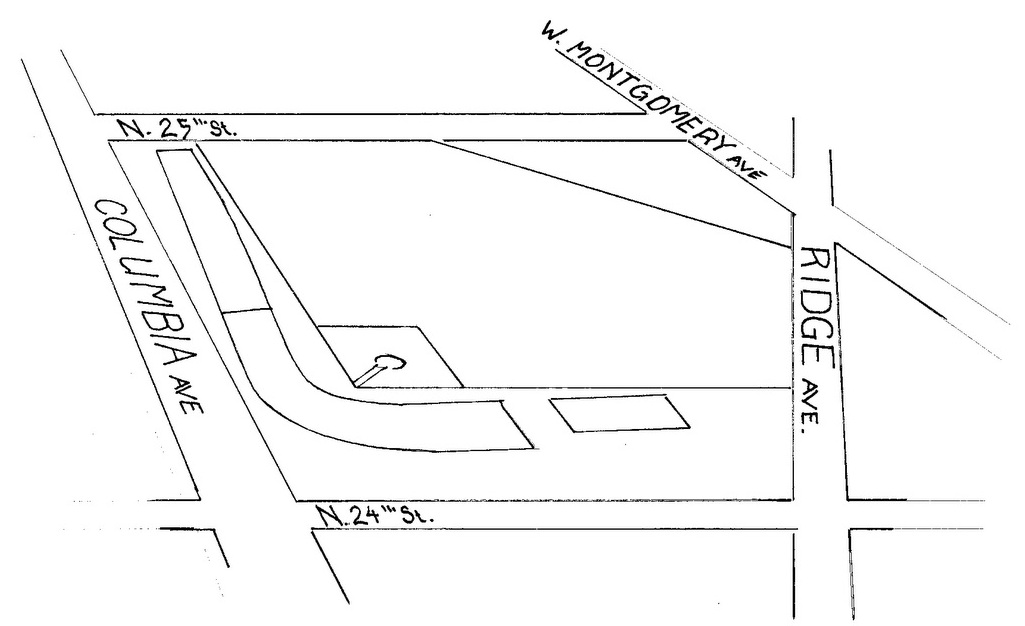
- Interactive map of Recreation Park
- Former names: Columbia Park (1866–1875), Centennial Base Ball Grounds (1875–1883), League Grounds (1884-1886)
- Location: Philadelphia, Pennsylvania
- Coordinates: 39.98092°N 75.17424°W
- Owner: City of Philadelphia
- Operator: Fiss & Doerr (1876)
- Capacity: 2,000 (1876); 6,500
- Surface: Grass
- Field size: Left – 300 ft. Center – 331 ft. Right – 247 ft.
- Public transit: Philadelphia Traction Co.: Union; Thirteenth & Fifteenth; Ridge Avenue

Construction
- Opened: In use by at least 1860.
- Closed: after 1888
- Demolished: c. 1890

Tenants
- Philadelphia Athletics (NA) (1861–1870); Philadelphia Pythians (1865-1871); Philadelphia Centennials (NA) (1875); Philadelphia Phillies (ECA) (1881); Philadelphia Phillies (League Alliance) (1882); University of Pennsylvania Quakers (1882-1884); Philadelphia Phillies (NL) (1883–1886)

Recreation Park was a baseball park in Philadelphia. The ballpark was the first home of the Philadelphia Phillies of the National League during the years 1883–1886, prior to the opening of National League Park in 1887. The University of Pennsylvania football team played home games at Recreation Park from 1882 to 1884. The park was bounded by 24th Street (east, first base); Ridge Avenue (north, right field); Montgomery Avenue (northwest, center field); 25th Street (west, left field); and Columbia Avenue (south, third base) (which in 1987 was renamed Cecil B. Moore Avenue after the civil-rights leader).

== 1860 to 1882 ==
The field was used at least as early as June 16, 1860, when Equity defeated Pennsylvania 65-52 in what author Charles Peverelly, writing about "the national game", called the "first baseball game played in Pennsylvania."

During the Civil War, a cavalry of the Union Army occupied the park. In 1866, with new houses bordering the field, a nine-foot fence was erected and the field was put back in shape for baseball. It was poorly maintained by 1871 and used increasingly less.

The Philadelphia Centennials of the National Association leveled and resodded the field, built a 10-foot fence, clubhouse and grandstands in 1875. They called it Centennial Base Ball Grounds. The team folded after just 14 games and the association followed at the end of the season. With no tenant the park fell into disrepair.

During the 1876-1879 period, the lot was used as a horse market. Local newspapers referred to its location variously as Ridge and 23rd, 24th or 25th. Most of the time it was given as 24th. The property was operated by horse merchants, Fiss & Doerr, who had holdings in multiple cities including New York and Boston.

In 1876, the ball field was named "Centennial Base Ball Grounds", and advertised for rent with a capacity of 2,000 by "Fiss & Doerr, Proprietors". Pigeon shooting was held at the field in 1875 and 1876. A pigeon shoot was staged at the park in January 1876 by Fiss & Doerr. When the first match ended in a tie, a second match was scheduled. There were 300 attendees along with the birds at the park when it was halted by the chief of police.

The ballfield was utilized by professional and amateur teams alike during this period. A benefit game was played in March 1879 between the top professional base ball players of the city and the gate receipts donated to Charles Mason who was reported to have been ill. The Athletics faced the University of Pennsylvania base ball club at the park in May 1879.

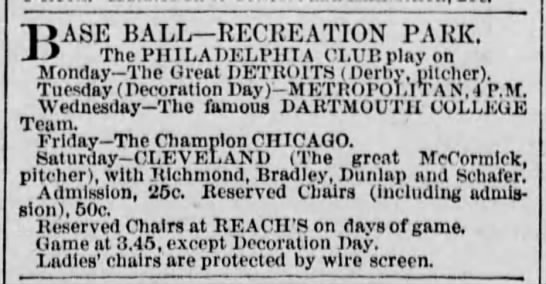
1882 Phillies home schedule week of May 28

In December 1876, a 110-yard foot race won by Trenton's Fred Rogers was held at the field. A 125-yard foot race was staged at the grounds in April 1880. John Crossley of Philadelphia's Frankford neighborhood defeated Frank McQuigan of Boston for a prize of $500 (approximately $15,000 in 2025).

The Eastern Championship Association Philadelphia Phillies played at the ballpark in 1881. Under the ownership of Al Reach, the Philadelphia Base Ball Club (the Phillies) "secured the Horse Market Grounds" on a long lease. By March 1882, Reach and Horace Phillips were reported to be fixing up the grounds to be a first class sports park. The Phillies would play at Recreation Park in 1882 as members of the minor league League Alliance.

== Philadelphia Phillies (1883–1886) ==
Alfred J. Reach acquired a five-year lease on the horse market property in 1882, renaming it "Recreation Park". He cleared the grounds, resodded the field, built a three-section wooden grandstand, and fielded the independent team called the "Phillies." The next year, Philadelphia joined the National League.

The Phillies played their first game ever on April 2, 1883 at Recreation Park, defeating the amateur Manayunk Ashlands by a score of 11-0 in a preseason exhibition game. The Phillies hosted Providence at Recreation Park in their first regular season game on May 1, 1883. One thousand fans saw John Coleman start for the Phillies and relinquish the first hit in the first inning to Providence first baseman Joe Start. The Phillies would score first and take a three to zero lead into the eighth when Providence scored four times to win the game.

The University of Pennsylvania Football team played its Philadelphia matches at Recreation Park from 1882 to 1884.

On October 16, 1884, in a post season exhibition game against the Athletics, it was reported that Harry Stovey hit the longest ball of the season at the park "over the church".

On June 1, 1885, nearly 10,000 fans filled the ballpark to see the Phillies face the New York Giants, with fans crowded down the right and left field foul lines. The August 22, 1886 game against the Giants was reported to have attracted more than 7,000 fans to the grounds.

Charlie Ferguson pitched the first no hitter in Phillies history, beating the Providence Grays 1-0 at Recreation Park on August 29, 1885. Ferguson walked two, and the Phillies committed two errors in the win.

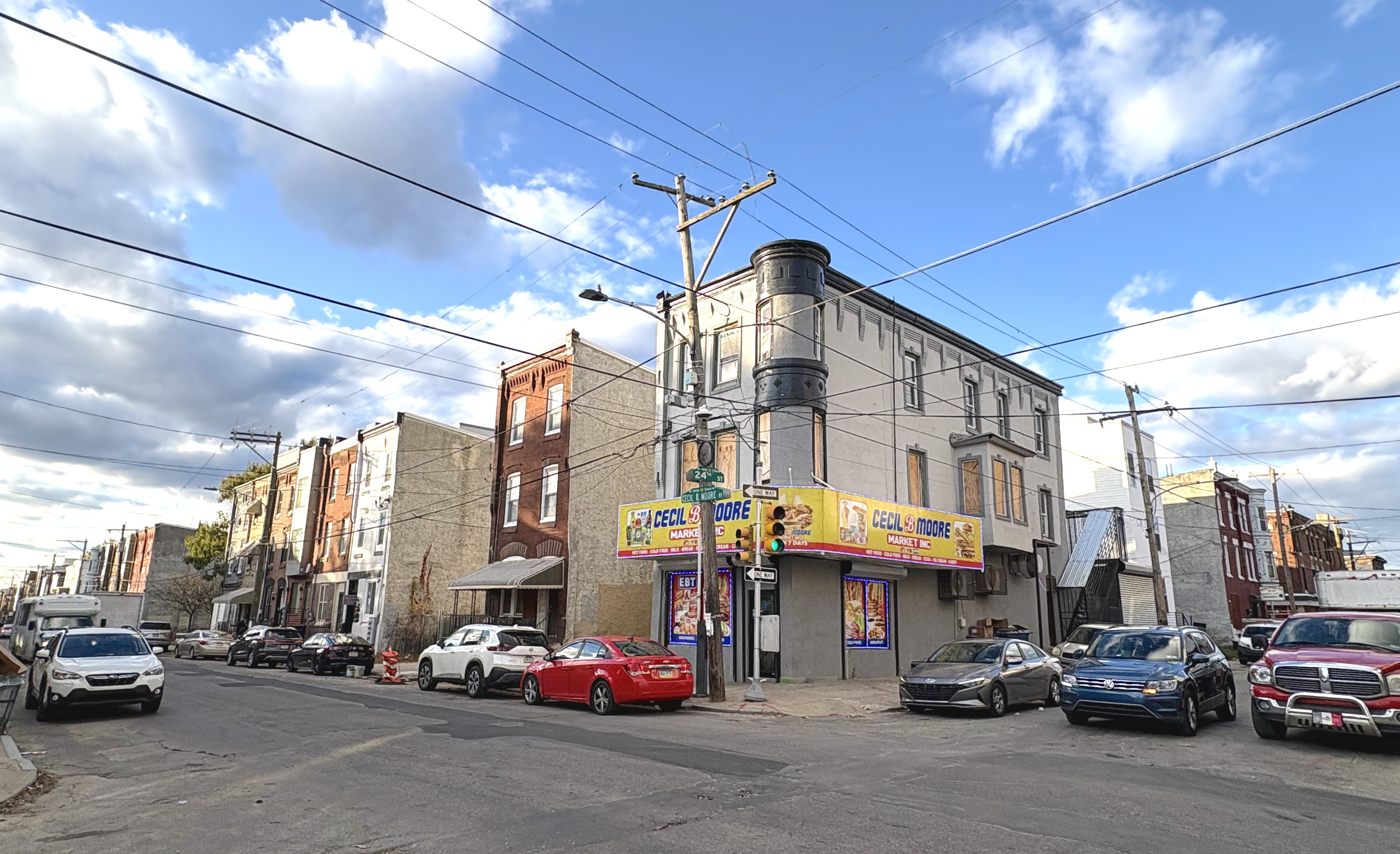
NW corner 24th St/Cecil B. Moore Ave (formerly Columbia Ave), former site Recreation Park. Grandstand and home-plate occupied corner; third base extended west down Columbia Ave (now Cecil B. Moore Ave. (November 2025)

Newspaper advertisements for games in 1884, 1885, and 1886 referred to the ballpark as "League Grounds". The ball field was accessible by public transit streetcars operated by the Philadelphia Traction Company on the Union, Thirteenth & Fifteenth, and Ridge Avenue lines.

Once the lease had expired following the 1886 season, the Phillies moved into their own new facility, Philadelphia Baseball Park, which they would call home for the next 51 1/2 years. In March 1887, the 95-foot flagstaff that stood at Recreation Park was transferred to the Phillies new ballpark and erected next to the exterior brick wall at the end of the Broad Street side of the field.

In March 1887, the University of Pennsylvania Juniors defeated the University of Pennsylvania Freshmen 25 to 7 on the "old League Grounds". Mudell's Solar Tips, a popular and strong baseball club sponsored by the John Mundell & Company, played at Recreation Park through at least the 1888 season. Their game against the McNeely Club drew 7,000 fans to Recreation Park on May 30, 1888. The grandstand would be razed and the site developed with residential housing. The 1895 G.W. Bromley atlas of Philadelphia shows the lot fully built and converted to houses.

There is no historical marker or any indication that a ballpark once stood on this site. As of 2026, a mini market stands on the corner where home plate was located, and urban housing occupies the area.

Preceded by first ballpark	Home of the Philadelphia Phillies; 1883 – 1886	Succeeded by Philadelphia Ball Park
