= Jefferson Street Grounds =

Former baseball field in Philadelphia, Pennsylvania, US (1864–90)

- Interactive map of Jefferson Street Grounds
- Former names: Olympic Ball Ground; Athletic Base Ball Grounds
- Location: Philadelphia, Pennsylvania, United States
- Coordinates: 39°58′41″N 75°10′35″W Jefferson Street Grounds (1883–1890); 39°58′40″N 75°10′43″W Jefferson Street Grounds (1864–1876)
- Owner: City of Philadelphia
- Capacity: 15,000 (1884); 5,200 (1883); 5,000 (1871)
- Surface: Natural grass

Construction
- Opened: May 25, 1864 (amateur); April 10, 1871 (professional); April 22, 1876 (National League); April 7, 1883 (American Association)
- Renovated: 1883
- Closed: October 11, 1890

Tenants
- Olympic Ball Club (1864-1871); Philadelphia Athletics (NA) (1871–1875); Philadelphia White Stockings (NA) (1873–1875); Philadelphia Athletics (NL) (1876); Philadelphia Athletics (AA) (1883–1890)

Jefferson Street Grounds was a baseball field located in Philadelphia, Pennsylvania. It was most commonly referred to by the club and in the press by its location, Twenty-Fifth and Jefferson Streets. It was first home to the amateur Olympic Base Ball Club beginning to 1864 when it was referred to as the Olympic Ball Ground. It was home to three different professional baseball teams, competing in three different leagues. Notably, it was the venue for the first game in National League history, played on April 22, 1876. The grounds were owned by the City of Philadelphia and leased to the teams.

== History ==
Baseball had first been played on the site in 1864. Several local clubs held their games there, including the historic Olympic Ball Club of Philadelphia, which had begun playing various varieties of town ball starting in the early 1830s and had adopted the "New York game" by 1860. When they began playing at the Jefferson site, the diamond was situated at the southeast corner, at 25th (first base) and Master (third base). The Olympics built a clubhouse along Master. Jefferson was behind right field. Local newspapers typically gave the ballfield location as "25th and Jefferson".

The grounds would be home to three different professional teams:

- Athletic Club of Philadelphia (also known as the Philadelphia Athletics) from 1871 to 1876. The team competed in the National Association until 1875, and in the National League of Base Ball Clubs in 1876.
- Philadelphia Base Ball Club (also known as the Philadelphia White Stockings) from 1873 to 1875, when they shared the venue with the Athletics. The White Stockings competed in the National Association.
- Philadelphia Athletics from 1883 to 1890. This franchise competed in the American Association.

=== 25th and Jefferson, 1864 to 1876 ===
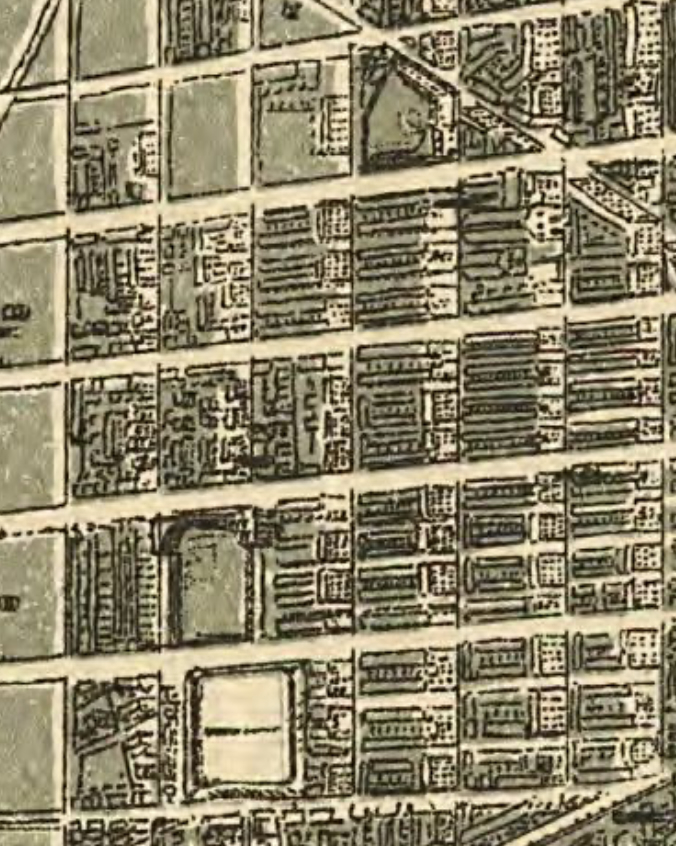
Recreation Park top right, and Jefferson Street Grounds bottom left (1887)

The grounds were located on a large block bounded by Jefferson Street (north); 25th Street (east); Master Street (south); and 27th Street (west). Across the street to the south was the Spring Garden Reservoir, which has since been filled in. Although often listed as one ballpark, the 1870s diamond was located in the opposite corner of the block from the 1880s diamond.

One of the first games was played on May 25, 1864 between selected players from New Jersey and Pennsylvania for the benefit of the Sanitary Commission. The field was referred to as the "Olympic Ball Ground, adjoining the Spring Garden Basin." More than 2,000 spectators saw the New Jersey nine defeat the Pennsylvania team 18-10. The following day, May 26, 1864, Athletic played a team of players from New York, Brooklyn, and Newark.

On September 3, 1869, Olympic hosted the Pythian in what the Philadelphia Inquirer described as "perhaps the first base ball game of the kind" between a white and black club. Octavius Catto played second base and batted second for Pythian. Olympic won the game 44-23 before a large crowd that overflowed the ropes and obstructed much of the last two innings of the game with on hand police making little effort to control it. Pythian were reported to have "acquitted themselves in a very creditable manner."

On March 27, 1871, the Inquirer reported, "Last week work was begun upon the Athletic Base Ball Club's new grounds, at Twenty-fifth and Jefferson Streets. A substantial board fence, ten feet high, is to be erected and other improvements made... The pavilions now on the old ground will be placed on the left of the catcher's position, and additional seats will be provided and so arranged that every spectator can have a perfect and unobstructed view of the game."

The first game was scheduled for April 10, 1871 at 3pm against a picked nine of local players including former players of the city's Olympic Club. Work on the facility had not yet been completed and it was anticipated that the expected nice weather would allow it to be completed in the following days. Athletic defeated the picked nine 19-4 before 3,000 fans.

The club's first official National Association home game was played on June 3. Athletic defeated Troy 15-5 before 3,000 fans in "intense heat".

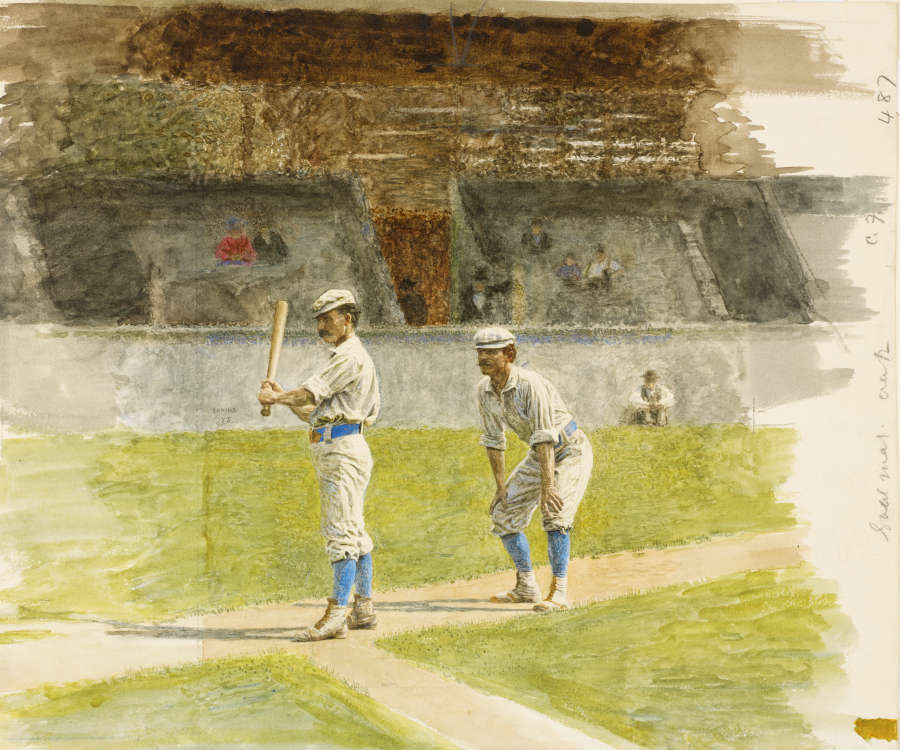
"Baseball Players Practicing" (1875) by Thomas Eakins depicting Athletic's Wes Fisler at bat at Jefferson Street Grounds

In 1874, a local speculator erected a viewing stand on the west side of the park outside the grandstand to sell tickets to fans at a cost lower than the fifty-cents charged by Athletic. The ball club placed an awning over its seating which blocked the view. The wildcat stands were shifted to enable fans to see over the awning. On June 8, 1874, prior to the start of the game between Philadelphia and Athletic, the stands collapsed under the weight of the fans injuring many.

On July 15, 1874, six thousand fans filled the park's two pavilions and stands down the left and right field lines to see Athletic, behind the pitching of Al Spalding defeat Boston.

The grounds were owned by the City of Philadelphia. In January 1876, the Philadelphia Base Ball Club offered the City $1,200 to lease the grounds for the season, considerably more than Athletic which paid the City $200 for the season. Athletic would retain the grounds, with their preexisting lease with the City.

The inaugural National League game was played there, on Saturday, April 22, 1876, between Athletic and Boston; Boston won, 6–5 in front of approximately 3,000 fans. It was the only National League game played that day, all others being rained out. This game is often pointed to as the beginning of Major League Baseball.

Athletic moved its grounds to 24th Street and Ridge Avenue in 1878 and the press reported, "The old ground of the Athletics, at Twenty-fifth and Jefferson, has been dismantled, and building operations will, probably, soon change the aspect of things."

=== 26th and Jefferson, 1883 to 1890 ===
After an early Athletics franchise was expelled from the National League following the 1876 season, the field fell into disuse. The City of Philadelphia cut 26th Street through the lot, allowing the eastern half of the large block to be developed. The western half remained vacant. A new American Association team, also called the Athletics, decided to move from their Oakdale Park after their inaugural 1882 season.

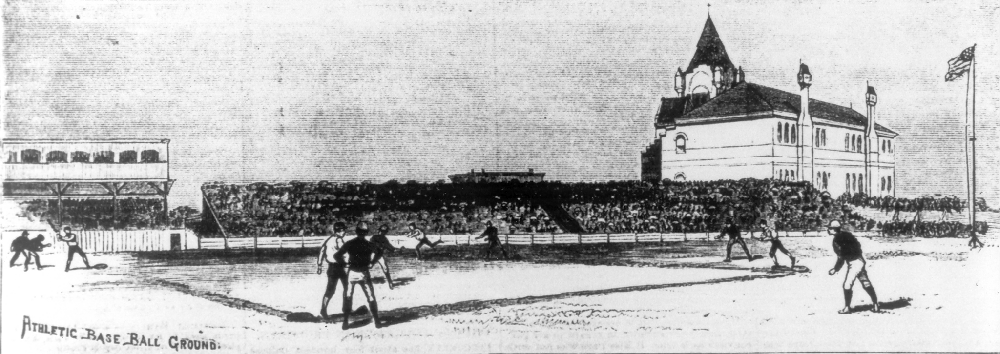
Athletic Base Ball Grounds, 27th and Master Streets, during 1883 season

Beginning in 1883, the Athletics leased the western half of the Jefferson Street lot, and erected a new diamond and grandstands at the northwest corner. Local newspapers then referred to the ballfield location as "26th and Jefferson", where there was an entrance gate. Also by this time, the venue was being called Athletic Grounds or Athletic Park. The grandstand, in "amphitheater form" sat 1,600 and faced south-east. There were 32 boxes, and the press and scorers table was directly behind home plate. The right and left field stands accommodated an additional 4,000 fans. The players' dressing rooms were under the grandstand and the managers' offices in the northeast corner of the field.

The Athletics opened the new ballpark to the public on Saturday, April 7, 1883 for a preseason exhibition game against Yale University which Athletic won 12 to 0. It was reported that the new ballpark could accommodate 5,000 to 6,000 fans.

On May 26, 1884, Athletic welcomed Toledo who featured African-American Moses Fleetwood Walker at catcher to Jefferson Street Grounds. Walker "was applauded when he came to the bat" and went 3 for 5 hitting fourth in a 14-8 Toledo loss.

One of the largest crowds at the ballpark was recorded on April 4, 1887 for the first game of Philadelphia's 1887 City Series when 9,183 tickets were sold and an "immense crowd" turned out to see the Phillies defeat the Athletics by a score of 10 to 2.

Prior to the 1889 season, a new band stand was erected on the left field side next to the grandstand large enough for a 25-piece military band.

On March 1, 1890, the Kensington Rovers and Philadelphia South End soccer clubs met at the ballpark in what Philadelphia Inquirer called "the roughest and most exciting game of football (under English Association rules) that has ever been played in this city..."

The last major league game played in the park was October 11, 1890.

The "Athletics" teams that played at the Jefferson Street Grounds do not have any direct lineage to the Philadelphia Athletics franchise that was an inaugural member of the American League in 1901, and exists today as the Athletics.

== Ballpark site today ==
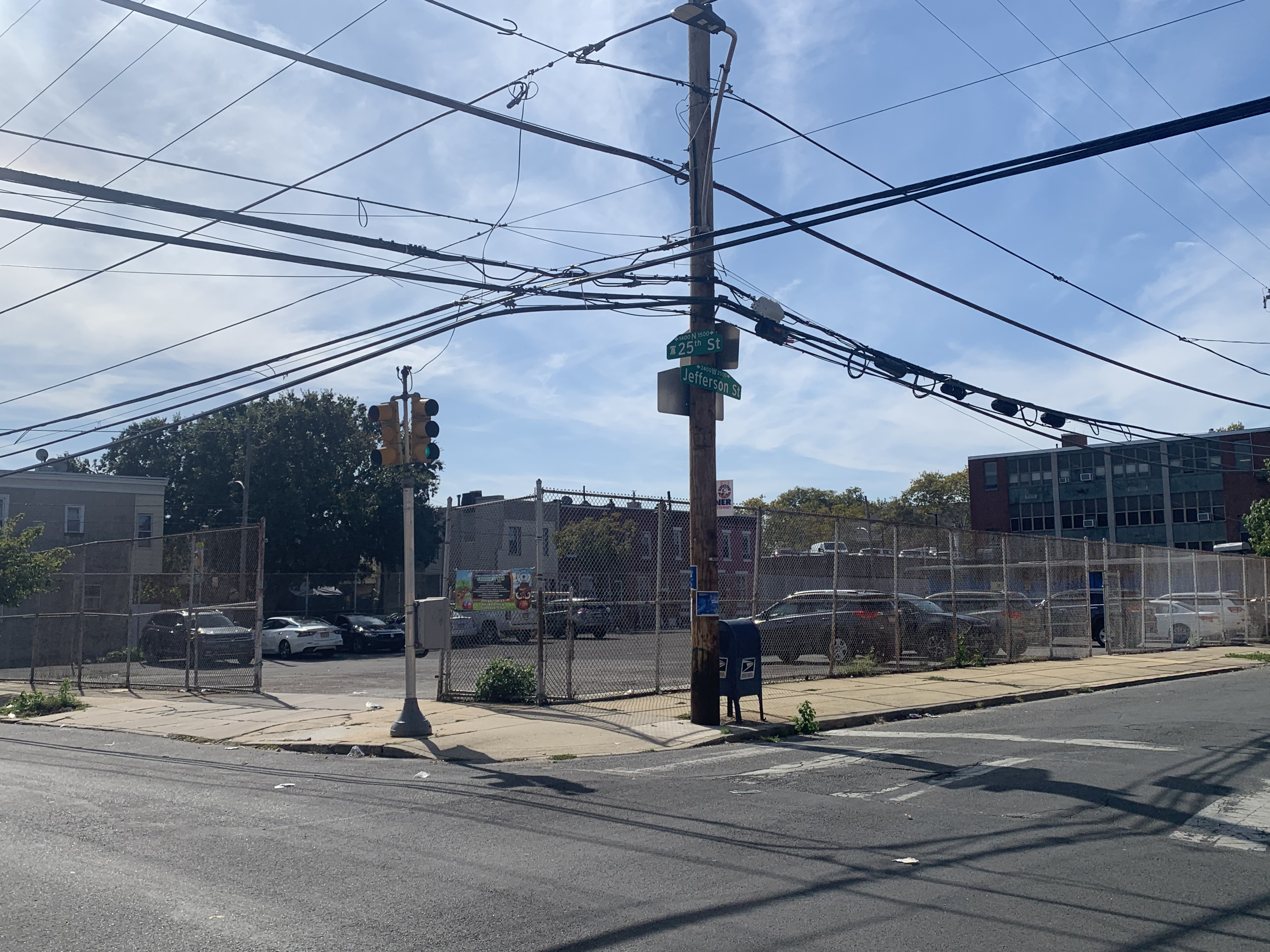
Northwest corner 25th and Jefferson Sts, former site of grandstand of Twenty-fifth and Jefferson ball park 1860-1876 in October 2025. Daniel Boone Public School is visible at right.

The ball field still exists in a revised form. The ballpark site is currently occupied by various structures including Daniel Boone Public School, also known as Camelot Academy, at 1435 N 26th St, and the Athletic Recreation Center and its ball fields. The field at the northwest corner of the lot approximates the location of the 1883–1890 diamond. A life-size replica of Thomas Eakins' 1875 "Baseball Players Practicing" at Jefferson Street Grounds is reproduced inside the recreation center.
