= Philadelphia Athletics (minor league) =

- 1877–1900; (1877, 1881–1882, 1889, 1892, 1894, 1896–1897, 1900); Philadelphia, Pennsylvania

Minor league affiliations
- Class: Class A (1892, 1897); Independent (1877, 1881–1882, 1889); Class B (1896, 1900)
- League: League Alliance (1877); Eastern Championship Association (1881); League Alliance (1882); Middle States League (1889); Eastern League (1892); Pennsylvania State League (1894, 1896); Atlantic League (1896–1897, 1900)

Major league affiliations
- Team: None

Minor league titles
- League titles (0): None

Team data
- Name: Philadelphia Defiance (1877); Philadelphia Athletics (minor league) (1877, 1881); Philadelphia Phillies (minor league) (1881–1882); Philadelphia Giants (1889); Philadelphia Athletics (1892); Philadelphia Colts (1894); Philadelphia Athletics (1896–1897, 1900)
- Ballpark: Oakdale Park (1881); Recreation Park (1882); Philadelphia Ball Park (1892, 1900)

The Philadelphia Athletics was the primary moniker of the minor league baseball teams based in Philadelphia, Pennsylvania. The minor league Philadelphia teams played various seasons in Philadelphia between 1877 and 1900.

The minor league Philadelphia teams played as members of the League Alliance (1877), Eastern Championship Association (1881), League Alliance (1882), Middle States League (1889), Eastern League (1892), Pennsylvania State League (1894, 1896) and Atlantic League (1896–1897, 1900).

The minor league Philadelphia Athletics played in the same era as various major league Philadelphia teams, some also called the "Athletics." The minor league Athletics immediately followed the early major league Philadelphia Athletics (1860–1876), overlapping with the major league Philadelphia Athletics (American Association), the major league Philadelphia White Stockings and the major league Philadelphia Athletics (1890–91).

The minor league Philadelphia Athletics directly preceded the major league Philadelphia Athletics who began play in 1901 and evolved to become today's Oakland Athletics. In addition, the minor league Philadelphia Phillies played in 1881–1882 and directly preceded the major league Philadelphia Phillies who began play in 1883.

== History ==
The minor league team was preceded by the Philadelphia Athletics (1860–1876), formally known as the "Athletic Base Ball Club of Philadelphia." This Athletics franchise played in Philadelphia as members of the National Amateur Association (1861–1870), National Association (1871–1875) and as charter members of the National League in 1876.

=== League Alliance (1877) ===
After the conclusion of the 1876 season, at a National League meeting, held on December 7, 1876, the Philadelphia Athletics were "expelled" from the National League. At the meeting, held during the National League convention in Cleveland, Ohio, the New York Mutuals and Philadelphia Athletics were expelled from the National League for refusing to travel west to play more games at the conclusion of their 1876 championship series. Their departures left the 1877 National League with only two eastern teams. As a response, in January, 1877 the St. Louis Globe-Democrat published a notice for a meeting of non-National League clubs, to be held in Pittsburgh, Pennsylvania in February, 1877. The St. Louis Red Stockings had not been chosen as a franchise in the initial National League. The Pittsburgh franchise agreed to host and pay costs of the meeting. It was proposed before the meeting by Chicago owner Al Spalding that Independent clubs could affiliate with the League by informing the league secretary of player contracts, by agreeing to play under National League rules and by agreeing to abide by the decision of the League regarding disputes. The meeting was held and the league was formed

The franchises who agreed to the structure then literally signed an alliance, leading to the League Alliance name and creation of the league.

The 1877 minor league Philadelphia Athletics (or "Athletic", as noted in some reports) began play as charter members of the 1877 League Alliance. Another Philadelphia team, called the Philadelphia Defiance was noted for entry and early play and a third Philadelphia team was simply called Philadelphia. The Defiance and Philadelphia teams possibly evolved into the "Athletics" moniker during the season or all the Philadelphia teams played games against the Athletics or both. The Philadelphia Athletics joined the initial League Alliance and completed the 1877 season with a league record of 3–2 in the 13–team League Alliance. Hicks Hayhurst served as the Philadelphia Athletics manager. League Alliance members played most games against other teams in their region and not always against other league teams. Only five League Alliance teams played as many as 30 games against other League Alliance teams, with Philadelphia not among them. The Philadelphia Athletics folded from the league after the initial season.

=== Eastern Championship Association (1881) ===
The 1881 Philadelphia Athletics became charter members of the Eastern Championship Association, along with another Philadelphia team, nicknamed the "Phillies.". The Eastern Championship Association was founded on April 11, 1881, at a meeting in New York City. The "Athletic club of Philadelphia" sent a message to the meeting of their desire to join the league and their membership was approved. It was also announced the Philadelphia Athletics would play home games at Oakdale Park and that they were hiring Charles Fulmer as the manager, assisted by Charles Mason. The Athletics ended the 1881 season with a 18–19 record while playing home games at Oakdale Park.

The second 1881 Philadelphia team, called the "Phillies" played briefly in the Eastern Championship Association before relocating. The Phillies began the season with a 1–1 Eastern Association record before moving to Baltimore, Maryland. The Phillies team played at Recreation Park.

=== League Alliance (1882) ===
The minor league Philadelphia Phillies resumed play in 1882, playing as members of the 1882 League Alliance. At a December 7, 1881, meeting in Providence, Rhode Island, Philadelphia and New York were admitted as members of the league. Philadelphia owner Al Reach was told that if he did not join the league, a new club would be placed in Philadelphia. A provision was stipulated that the Philadelphia and New York teams would play a "championship series" totaling 24 games. New York won the series which drew sizable crowds to the Polo Grounds and Recreation Park. Philadelphia ended the 1882 season with a record of 12–20 under managers Horace Phillips and Billy Barnie.

In 1883, the team became a major league franchise. The Phillies continued play at Recreation Park as the franchise joined the National League, where the Philadelphia Phillies continue to play today.

=== Middle States League (1889) ===
In 1889, the Philadelphia Giants became charter members of the short–lived Independent level Middle States League. The Middle States League was an integrated league, that included two African American teams, the Cuban Giants and the New York Gorhams. The Philadelphia Giants had a record of 2–24 under manager Charlie Mason when the franchise disbanded on June 25, 1889. The Middle States League permanently folded after the 1889 season.

=== Eastern League (1892) ===
The Philadelphia Athletics resumed minor league play as members of the 1892 Class A level Eastern League. The league was planned as a short–season league, with games scheduled from late April to late July. The Athletics had a 12–26 record in the ten–team Eastern League under manager Harry Lyons when Philadelphia disbanded on June 19, 1892. The Birmingham Bingos were the league champion. Although many sources repeat the claim that the team played at Forepaugh Park in 1892,

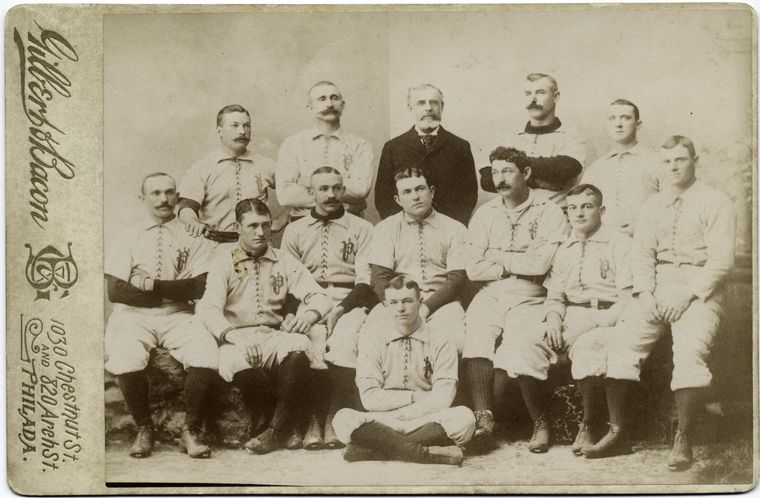
Philadelphia Baseball Club, P., 1892, Allen, Reilly, Thompso - (4051193132)

local newspapers indicate that all home games were played at Philadelphia Park, generally on days when the Phillies were playing road games. With their season ending prematurely, the Athletics were only able to play about 15 home games.

=== Pennsylvania State League (1894, 1896) ===
In 1894, the Easton Dutchman of the Pennsylvania State League moved to Philadelphia on July 4, 1894, with an 8–36 record. The Philadelphia Colts then finished the Pennsylvania State League season. The Easton/Philadelphia team ended the 1894 season with an overall record of 40–74, placing 8th in the Pennsylvania State League, playing under managers Charlie Levis, Bill Parks and Jim Randall. Philadelphia finished last, ending the season 26.0 games behind the 1st place Pottsville Colts.

The Philadelphia Athletics played in two different leagues in 1896. The "Athletics" moniker returned, as Philadelphia continued play in the 1896 Pennsylvania State League. The Athletics had a record of 39–16, and were 2nd in the Pennsylvania League standings when league disbanded on June 11, 1896. Co–owner Bill Sharsig served as manager and the Philadelphia franchise soon joined another league in 1986.

=== Atlantic League (1896–1897, 1900) ===
The 1896 Philadelphia Athletics joined in the first season of play for the eight–team Class B level Atlantic League after the Pennsylvania State League folded. The Athletics became members on July 13, 1886, when the New York Metropolitans (30–32) were "expelled" from the Atlantic League and immediately replaced by the Philadelphia Athletics. Inheriting the New York record, the Athletics continued play to finish with an overall record of 57–69, placing 4th in the Athletic League standings, finishing 13.0 games behind the champion Newark Colts. John Irwin and Bill Sharsig were the New York/Philadelphia team managers as Sharsig managed the 1896 Philadelphia teams in both leagues.

The Philadelphia Athletics continued play in the 1897 Atlantic League. The Athletics ended the 1897 season with a record of 49–89, placing 7th in the Atlantic League standings, finishing 43.0 games behind the 1st place Lancaster Maroons. The Athletics played under returning co–owner/manager Bill Sharsig.

After a two-season hiatus, the Philadelphia Athletics returned to Atlantic League play in 1900, which proved to be their final minor league season. The 1900 Philadelphia Athletics lasted only a partial season. On June 4, 1900, the Philadelphia Athletics had a 10–11 record when the franchise moved to Harrisburg, Pennsylvania. On June 14, 1900, the team was 0–6 in Harrisburg, with an overall record of 10–17, 5th in the standings under manager Duff Cooley when the Atlantic League disbanded for the season. Baseball Hall of Fame member Hughie Jennings played for the 1900 Philadelphia Athletics.

The Philadelphia Athletics began play in the 1901 American League, evolving into the Kansas City Athletics and today's Oakland Athletics.

== The ballparks ==
The 1881 minor league Athletics were noted to have played minor league home tames at Oakdale Park. Oakdale Park was located at Huntingdon Street (North), 11th Street (East), Cumberland Street (South), and 12th Street (West), Philadelphia, Pennsylvania. The site is still a public park today.

The minor league Philadelphia Phillies were referenced to have played home games at Recreation Park in 1882. Also called Columbia Park (1866–1875) and Centennial Park (1875–1883), the ballpark was located at 24th Street & Ridge Avenue and 25th Street & Columbia Avenue, Philadelphia, Pennsylvania.

Despite sources claims that the 1892 Athletics played their meager home season at Forepaugh Park, local newspapers indicate all of their home games were played at Philadelphia Park.

The Atlantic League 1900 Philadelphia Athletics played their home games at the Phillies' Philadelphia Ball Park.

== Timeline ==
| Year(s) | # Yrs. | Team | Level | League |
|---|---|---|---|---|
| 1877 (1) | 1 | Philadelphia Defiance | Independent | League Alliance |
| 1877 (2) | 1 | Philadelphia Athletics | Independent | League Alliance |
| 1881 (1) | 1 | Philadelphia Athletics | Independent | Eastern Championship Association |
| 1881 (2) | 1 | Philadelphia Phillies | Independent | Eastern Championship Association |
| 1882 | 1 | Philadelphia Phillies | Independent | League Alliance |
| 1889 | 1 | Philadelphia Giants | Independent | Middle States League |
| 1892 | 1 | Philadelphia Athletics | Class A | Eastern League |
| 1894 | 1 | Philadelphia Colts | Independent | Pennsylvania State League |
| 1896(1) | 1 | Philadelphia Athletics | Independent | Pennsylvania State League |
| 1896(2) | 1 | Philadelphia Athletics | Class B | Atlantic League |
| 1897 | 1 | Philadelphia Athletics | Class A | Atlantic League |
| 1900 | 1 | Philadelphia Athletics | Class B | Atlantic League |

== Notable alumni ==
- Hughie Jennings (1900) Inducted, Baseball Hall of Fame 1945
- John Montgomery Ward (1877) Inducted, Baseball Hall of Fame 1964
- Phil Baker (1877)
- Charlie Barber (1881)
- Charlie Bastian (1894)
- Larry Battam (1881, 1900)
- Joe Battin (1882)
- Ernie Beam (1896)
- George Bechtel (1877)
- Frank Berkelbach (1881)
- Jud Birchall (1877, 1881)
- Sumner Bowman (1892)
- Charlie Buffinton (1882)
- Bill Byers (1900)
- Ed Carfrey (1894)
- Nixey Callahan (1894)
- Pete Childs (1894, 1896–1897)
- William Coon (1877)
- John Coleman (1897)
- Bert Conn (1897, 1900)
- Ben Conroy (1896)
- Jack Corcoran (1882)
- Pop Corkhill (1882)
- Jack Darragh (1892)
- Ira Davis (1897)
- Bill Day (1889)
- Jim Devlin (1892)
- Cozy Dolan (1897)
- Denny Driscoll (1881)
- Bill Duggleby (1900)
- Dave Eggler (1877)
- Ben Ellis (1896)
- Harry Ely (1894)
- Frank Eustace (1894, 1900)
- Frank Fennelly (1882)
- Alex Ferson (1897)
- Jim Field (1900)
- Wes Fisler (1877)
- Tom Fleming (1900)
- Elmer Foster (1882)
- George Fox (1896–1897)
- Chick Fulmer (1877, 1881)
- Eddie Fusselback (1881)
- Gid Gardner (1881–1882)
- Ned Garvin (1897)
- Mike Grady (1897)
- James Graham (1896)
- Bill Gray (1892)
- Ed Green (1892)
- Joe Gunson (1900)
- Bill Hallman (1894)
- Charlie Hamburg (1881)
- Bill Harbridge (1881)
- Dick Harley (1897)
- Hardie Henderson (1882)
- George Hodson (1889)
- Charlie Householder (1881)
- Fred Jacklitsch (1897, 1900)
- Hughie Jennings (1900)
- Charlie Jordan (1896–1897)
- Joe Kappel (1892)
- Harry Keener (1896, 1900)
- Matt Kilroy (1892)
- Sam Kimber (1889)
- Doc Landis (1877, 1881)
- Arlie Latham (1881, 1892)
- Jack Leiper (1894)
- Con Lucid (1896)
- Harry Luff (1881)
- Harry Lyons (1892)
- Andy Knox (1889)
- Art Madison (1896)
- Fergy Malone (1877)
- Jack Manning (1882)
- Tim Manning (1882)
- Charlie Mason (1881)
- Bill Massey (1894)
- Charles Matthews (1894)
- Al Maul (1892)
- Sparrow McCaffrey (1892)
- Jerry McCormick (1889)
- Bill McCloskey (1881)
- Bill McClellan (1882)
- Hal McClure (1877)
- John McMullin (1877)
- Sam Mertes (1896)
- Levi Meyerle (1877)
- Jocko Milligan (1896)
- Ed Morris (1882)
- Mike Moynahan (1882)
- Henry Myers (1877, 1881)
- Jack Neagle (1882)
- Jack O'Brien (1881)
- John O'Rourke (1881)
- Horace Phillips (1877)
- Walter Plock (1889)
- Marshall Quinton (1882)
- Jack Rafter (1897)
- Al Reach (1877)
- Charlie Reilly (1894)
- John Richmond (1881)
- Johnny Ryan (1877)
- Ed Sales (1892)
- Lou Say (1877)
- Count Sensenderfer (1877)
- Spike Shannon (1900)
- John Shetzline (1877, 1881, 1889)
- George Shoch (1900)
- Charles Snyder (1894)
- Dummy Stephenson (1894, 1900)
- Joe Straub (1882)
- Harry Stovey (1877)
- Cub Stricker (1881, 1897)
- Tom Stouch (1896)
- Jack Taylor (1894)
- Sam Trott (1877)
- George Ulrich (1892)
- Charlie Waitt (1877)
- Fred Warner (1881)
- Sam Weaver (1877, 1881)
- Gus Weyhing (1894)
- Ed Whiting (1900)
- Jesse Whiting (1881)
- Bill Whitrock (1900)
- Dave Williams (1900)
- Tug Wilson (1892)
- Pete Woodruff (1897)
- Stan Yerkes (1894, 1896)

== See also ==
- Philadelphia Athletics (minor league) players
- Philadelphia Phillies (minor league) players
- Philadelphia (minor league baseball) players
- Philadelphia Athletic players
- Philadelphia Defiance players
- Philadelphia Colts players
- Philadelphia Giants (Middle States League) players
