= Athletic Grounds (Philadelphia) =

Former baseball field in Pennsylvania, US (1864–90)

- Interactive map of Athletic Grounds
- Location: Philadelphia, Pennsylvania, United States
- Coordinates: 39.980556°N 75.163056°W
- Surface: Natural grass

Construction
- Opened: 1860
- Closed: 1870

Tenant
- Philadelphia Athletics (National Association of Base Ball Players) (1860–1870)

Athletic Grounds was a baseball field located in Philadelphia, Pennsylvania, during the 1860s. It was the first home of the Philadelphia Athletics (1860–1876). It was often called the grounds at 15th and Columbia.

== Location ==
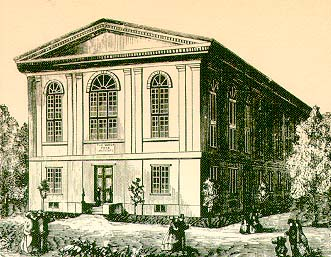
Wagner Free Institute, at 17th and Montgomery

The ballpark's location has typically been given as North 15th Street and Columbia Avenue (now Cecil B. Moore Avenue). Local newspapers normally presented the location as 15th and Columbia. The Philadelphia Inquirer for June 15, 1869, p. 3, gave the location as 17th and Columbia.

As shown in contemporary illustrations, the diamond was overlooked by the Wagner Free Institute of Science, which still stands, on the southwest corner of 17th and Montgomery. The complete location of the ballpark can be defined as Columbia (Cecil B. Moore) Avenue (south, right field); North 15th Street (east, left field); Montgomery Street (north, third base); and North 17th Street and Wagner Free Institute of Science (west, first base).

The large plot of ground once occupied by the ballpark now includes part of the Temple University campus; residential buildings; and a police station.

== Famous events ==
Atlantic vs. Athletic – Oct. 30, 1865

The ballpark was the site of several celebrated matches between the Athletics and the Atlantics of Brooklyn, on October 30, 1865; and on October 1 and 22, 1866. The October 1, 1866, game in particular drew a large, unruly crowd that forced the postponement of the game by three weeks. In the interim, Atlantic defeated Athletic in Brooklyn, while the Athletics management built a fence around the field in an effort to control the crowd. Athletic won the October 22 game, which was supposed to set up a deciding game. The current precinct police station stands about where the diamond was.

In a game against the "Active" club of New York on August 11, 1865, the Athletics were defeated 28–13. The newspaper attributed the loss to two key players being "indisposed"; and to the loss of a favorite ball that "was knocked over the fence that separates the Athletic play ground from the Wagner Free Institute of Science." The school's principal refused to return the ball, and that was said to have affected the morale of the Athletics. [Philadelphia Inquirer, Aug 11, 1865, p. 8]

== Notes ==
The "Athletics" teams that played at the Athletic Grounds have no direct lineage to the Philadelphia Athletics franchise that was an inaugural member of the American League in 1901, and exists today as the Athletics.
