= Eastern Championship Association =

- Classification: Independent (1881)
- Sport: Minor League Baseball
- First season: 1881
- Folded: 1881
- Replaced by: American Association (1882–1891)
- President: William Harridge (1881)
- No. of teams: 6
- Country: United States of America
- Most titles: 1 New York Metropolitans (1881)

The Eastern Championship Association was an independent minor baseball league that played in the 1881 season, as an early minor league. The league franchises were based in New York, Pennsylvania and Washington D.C. Teams were permitted to play non-league games. The New York Metropolitans won the league championship.

== History ==
The Eastern Championship Association was founded on April 11, 1881 at a meeting in New York City. Present at the meeting were William W. White of the Nationals of Washington, Louis H. Mahn of the “new Boston nine,” William Barnie of the Atlantics of Brooklyn, John Kelly of the New York team, and James Mutrie of the Metropolitans of New York. The Athletic club of Philadelphia sent a message endorsing the Association and pledging to join the league.

The league set the following parameters at the inaugural meeting: The league schedule would run from April 20 through October 1. Applications for membership would be accepted until May 15, 1881. Association teams would play 12 total games against each other, six at each home ballpark. If a franchise left the league before the season concluded, none of the games it played against other Association members would count in determining the champion. So long as doing so did not prevent them from fulfilling their 12—game obligation to the league, member teams could also play games against National League opponents, college teams, independent clubs or "commercial nines." The "Mahn dead ball" was adopted for use in all games between Association teams.

The league members were the Brooklyn Atlantics, New York Metropolitans, New York New Yorks, New York Quicksteps, Philadelphia Athletics and Washington Nationals / Albany.

During the season, the league teams fluctuated. The Washington Nationals folded and were replaced by the Albany team.

A second 1881 Philadelphia team, called the "Phillies" played briefly in the Eastern Championship Association before relocating. The Phillies began the season with a 1–1 Eastern Championship Association record before moving to Baltimore, Maryland.

Baseball Hall of Fame member Dan Brouthers played for both the Brooklyn Atlantics and New York New Yorks in 1881.

The Eastern Championship Association played one season. After the 1881 season, the New York Metropolitans and Philadelphia Athletics sought major league status. In November 1881, the American Association (1882–1891) was formed.

== Cities represented ==
- Albany, New York: Albany (1881)
- Brooklyn, New York: Brooklyn Atlantics (1881)
- New York City, New York: New York Metropolitans, New York New Yorks, New York Quicksteps (1881)
- Philadelphia, Pennsylvania: Philadelphia Athletics, Philadelphia Phillies (1881)
- Washington D.C.: Washington Nationals (1881)

== Yearly standings ==
1881 Eastern Championship Association

Team standings	W	L	PCT	GB	Managers
New York Metropolitans	36	16	.692	-	NA
Albany	14	8	.5636	4	NA
Washington Nationals	8	7	.533	6	NA
Philadelphia Phillies	1	1	.500	10½	NA
Philadelphia Athletics	18	19	.486	11½	NA
Brooklyn Atlantics	8	20	.286	12½	NA
New York New Yorks	1	8	.111	13½	NA
New York Quicksteps	1	8	.111	13½	NA
