= Philadelphia Athletics (American Association) all-time roster =

List of baseball players

- The following is a list of players and who appeared in at least one game for the **Philadelphia Athletics** franchise, which played in the American Association from 1882–1890. Note that this does not include players for the Athletics who played in the AA in 1891, which was a separate, unrelated team.

Players in bold are in the Baseball Hall of Fame.

== A ==
- Tug Arundel
- Al Atkinson
- Jake Aydelott

== B ==
- Jersey Bakely
- Kid Baldwin
- George Bausewine
- Ed Beatin
- Lou Bierbauer
- Jud Birchall
- Bill Blair
- Bob Blakiston
- George Bradley
- Jack Brennan
- Jim Brown

== C ==
- Sam Campbell
- Bart Cantz
- Ed Carfrey
- George Carman
- Tommy Casey
- Frank Chapman
- Ed Clark
- John Coleman
- Bill Collins
- Ben Conroy
- Jim Conway
- Fred Corey
- George Crawford
- Lave Cross
- Bill Crowley
- Ed Cushman

== D ==
- Joe Daly
- Jerry Dorgan

== E ==
- Henry Easterday
- Bob Emslie
- Duke Esper

== F ==
- Bill Farmer
- Bill Farrell
- Frank Fennelly
- Dennis Fitzgerald
- Ed Flanagan
- Robert Foster
- Eddie Fusselback

== G ==
- Bob Gamble
- Charlie Gessner
- Whitey Gibson
- Bill Gleason
- Jack Gleason
- James Graham
- Ed Green
- Bill Greenwood
- Ed Greer
- Tom Gunning

== H ==
- Ed Halbriter
- Bill Hart
- Pete Hasney
- Horace Helmbold
- Charlie Hilsey
- Sadie Houck
- Al Hubbard
- Bill Hughes
- Mickey Hughes
- William Hyndman

== I ==
- John Irwin

== J ==
- Jack Jones

== K ==
- Joe Kappel
- Charlie Kelly
- Ted Kennedy
- Bill Kienzle
- Lon Knight
- Ed Knouff
- Andy Knox

== L ==
- William Lackey
- Doc Landis
- Henry Larkin
- Juice Latham
- Tom Lovett
- Denny Lyons

== M ==
- Macey (first name unknown)
- Fred Mann
- John Mansell
- Mike Mansell
- Charlie Mason
- Bobby Mathews
- Mike Mattimore
- McBride (first name unknown)
- Chippy McGarr
- Sadie McMahon
- George Meyers
- Cyclone Miller
- Jocko Milligan
- Frank Mountain
- Mike Moynahan

== O ==
- Jack O'Brien
- Ed O'Neil

== P ==
- Ed Pabst
- Tom Poorman
- Jim Powell
- Bill Price
- Blondie Purcell

== Q ==
- Joe Quest
- Marshall Quinton

== R ==
- Charlie Reynolds
- John Richmond
- John Riddle
- Frank Ringo
- **Wilbert Robinson**
- Chief Roseman
- Ed Rowen
- Joseph Roxburgh

== S ==
- Al Sauter
- Jimmy Say
- Lou Say
- Ed Seward
- Taylor Shafer
- Orator Shafer
- Frank Siffell
- Phenomenal Smith
- Pop Smith
- Rex Smith
- Charles Snyder
- George Snyder
- Stafford
- Charlie Stecher
- John Sterling
- Harry Stine
- Harry Stovey
- Joe Straub
- Cub Stricker
- George Strief
- Mike Sullivan
- Bill Sweeney
- Ham Sweigert

== T ==
- Billy Taylor
- Ledell Titcomb
- George Townsend

== V ==
- Bill Vinton

== W ==
- Sam Weaver
- Curt Welch
- Gus Weyhing
- Jim Whitney

== Z ==
- Frank Zinn
