= 1890 Philadelphia Athletics season =

1890 Philadelphia Athletics
- League: American Association
- Ballpark: Jefferson Street Grounds
- City: Philadelphia, Pennsylvania
- Record: 54–78 (.409)
- League place: 8th
- Owners: Bill Sharsig, H. C. Pennypacker, William Whitaker
- Manager: Bill Sharsig

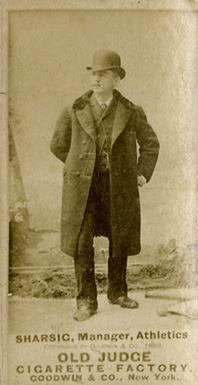
Manager Bill Sharsig

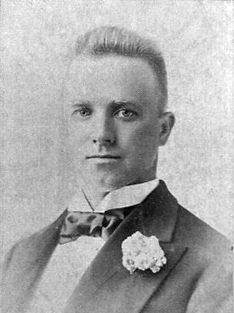
Pitcher Sadie McMahon

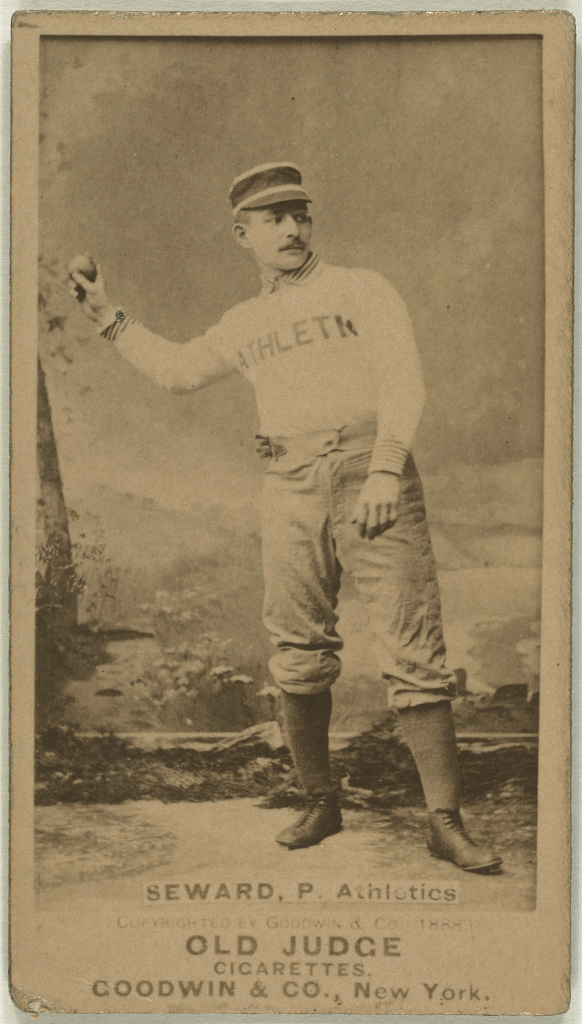
Pitcher Ed Seward

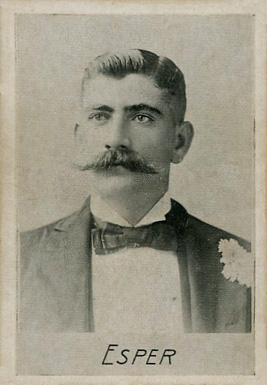
Pitcher Duke Esper

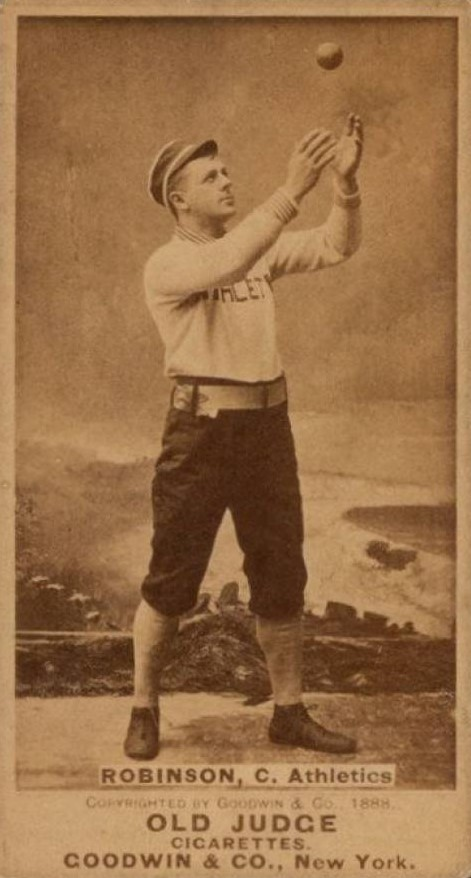
Catcher Wilbert Robinson

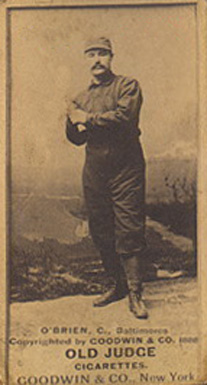
First baseman Jack O'Brien

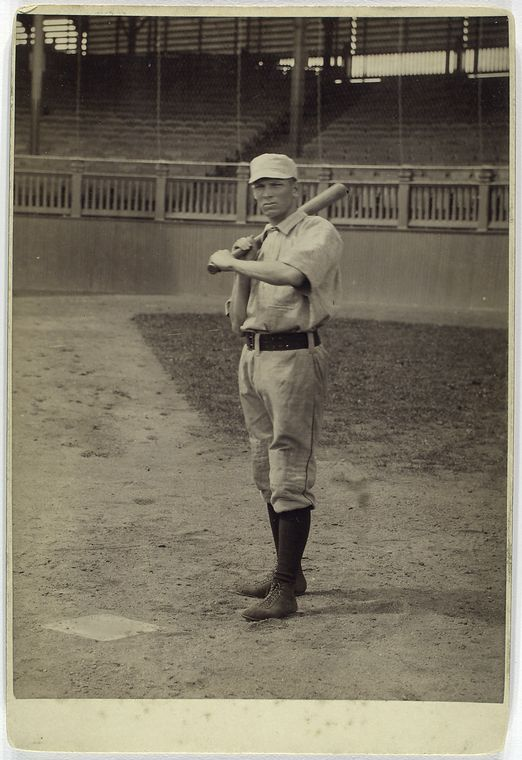
Third baseman Denny Lyons

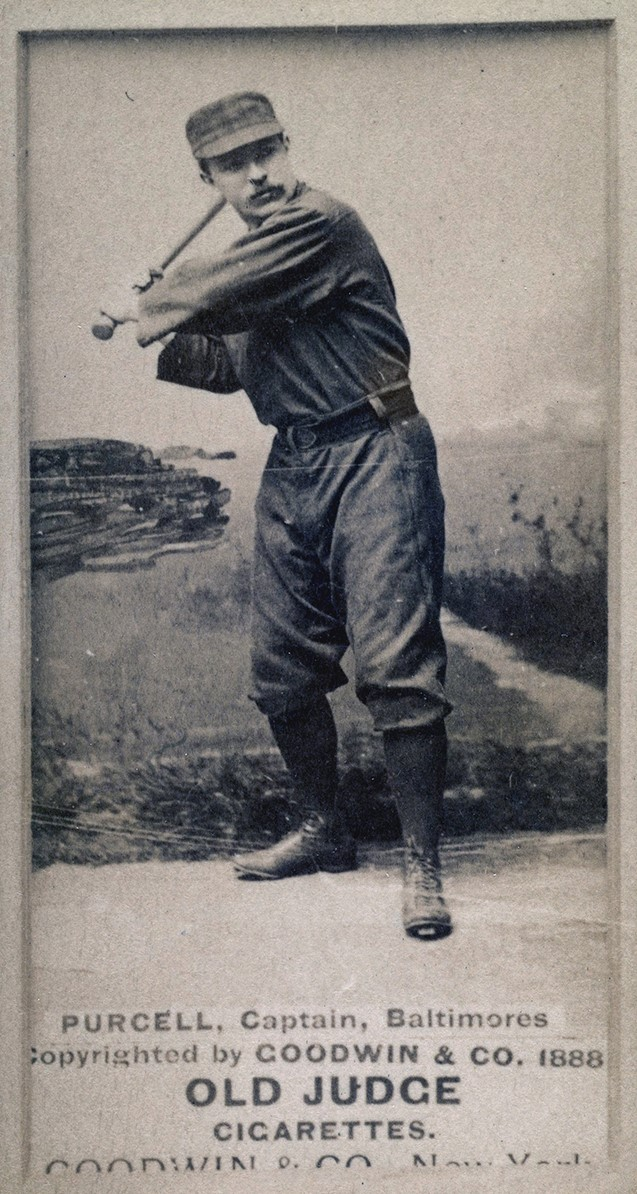
Left fielder Blondie Purcell

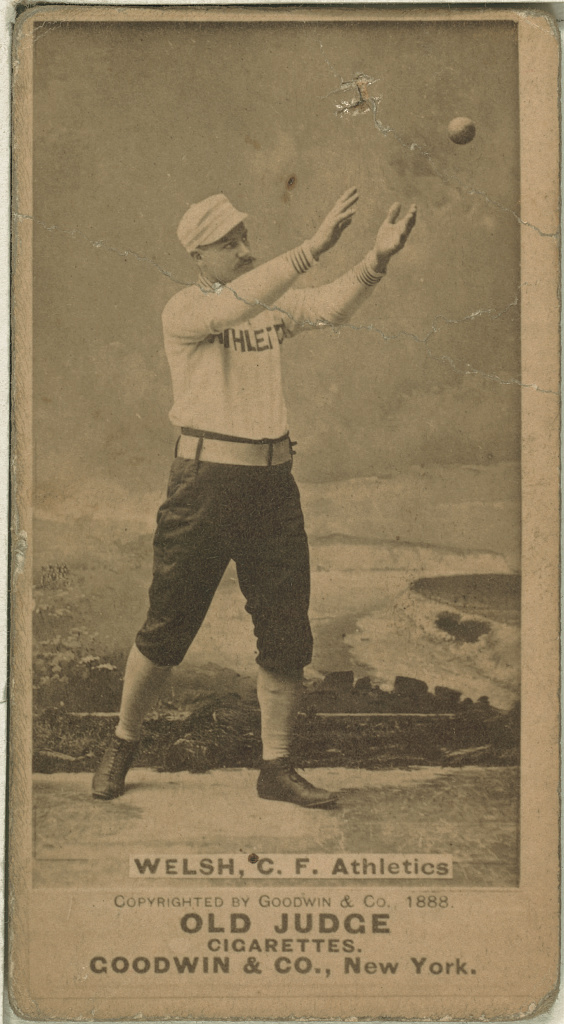
Center fielder Curt Welch

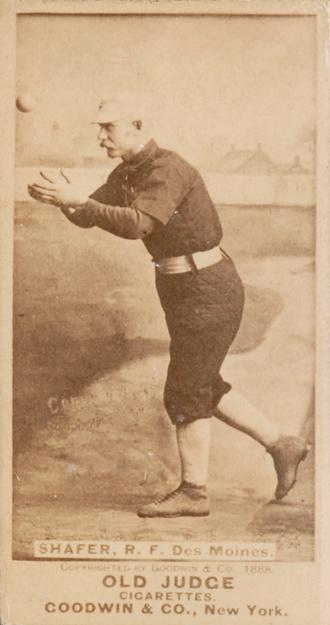
Right fielder Orator Shafer

The 1890 Philadelphia Athletics had a 54–78 record and finished in eighth place in the American Association. During the season, the team struggled financially. They could not afford to keep paying their players and had to finish the season with a pickup team.

== Summary ==
Led by pitcher Sadie McMahon (29–18 win–loss record) and third baseman Denny Lyons (193 OPS+), the Athletics started the season with a record of 41–21. At that point, on July 6, they were in first place by five games. However, the team was struggling financially, and then they also struggled on the field. They sold Lyons to the St. Louis Browns on September 6. After winning on September 14, they had a 54–56 record and were in sixth place out of nine teams, 15 games out of first. The Athletics lost their next game on September 16 right before leaving on a 16-game western road trip. By then, they were unable to pay their players. That day, they released their starting catcher and only future Hall of Famer, Wilbert Robinson, who signed with the Baltimore Orioles two days later. Many of the Athletics' other players deserted the team. Among those who left were three regulars who never played in the major leagues again: right fielder Orator Shafer (113 OPS+) played his last game on September 13, and first baseman Jack O'Brien (126 OPS+) and left fielder Blondie Purcell (108 OPS+) both played their last game on September 16.

For the road trip, Athletics manager Bill Sharsig was sent off with $245 (equivalent to $8,779 in 2025) and what was left of the team. As writer David Nemec noted, "[Sharsig] then lived from hand to mouth by spending gate receipts from each series to pay his players and hotel bills and buy train tickets to the next city. By the end of the season he was reduced each day to putting a uniform on anyone who even looked like a ballplayer in order to field a full nine-man lineup." Among the "major league" players who appeared for the team in October were four people who are listed in the record books by just their last names, as their first names are unknown. The Athletics lost all 16 games on that road trip, and then they lost their last five games at home. Overall, they finished their season on a 22-game losing streak for a record of 54–78 and eighth place. Of those 22 losses, 13 of them were by at least 10 runs. They played the seventh-place Syracuse Stars in their last series of the season, and in three games, they were outscored by the Stars 43–7.

The Athletics were expelled from the American Association after the season ended. They were replaced by a new Philadelphia Athletics team that had been in the Players' League in 1890.

== Regular season ==
=== Season standings ===
American Association
Team	W	L	Pct.	GB	Home	Road
Louisville Colonels	88	44	.667	—	57‍–‍13	31‍–‍31
Columbus Solons	79	55	.590	10	47‍–‍22	32‍–‍33
St. Louis Browns	78	58	.574	12	45‍–‍25	33‍–‍33
Toledo Maumees	68	64	.515	20	40‍–‍27	28‍–‍37
Rochester Broncos	63	63	.500	22	40‍–‍22	23‍–‍41
Baltimore Orioles	15	19	.441	24	8‍–‍11	7‍–‍8
Syracuse Stars	55	72	.433	30½	30‍–‍30	25‍–‍42
Philadelphia Athletics	54	78	.409	34	36‍–‍36	18‍–‍42
Brooklyn Gladiators	26	73	.263	45½	15‍–‍22	11‍–‍51

=== Record vs. opponents ===
1890 American Association record Sources:
Team	BAL	BKG	COL	LOU	PHA	RCH	STL	SYR	TOL
Baltimore	—	0–0	2–4–2	1–2–1	2–2	5–1	2–5	1–2	2–3–1
Brooklyn	0–0	—	5–9	2–13	2–10	3–10–1	4–10	5–12	5–9
Columbus	4–2–2	9–5	—	10–8–1	11–9	10–9–1	12–8–2	10–7	13–7
Louisville	2–1–1	13–2	8–10–1	—	17–3	11–6–2	9–11	14–5	14–6
Philadelphia	2–2	10–2	9–11	3–17	—	7–12	7–13	10–7	6–14
Rochester	1–5	10–3–1	9–10–1	6–11–2	12–7	—	8–12–1	11–4–1	6–11–1
St. Louis	5–2	10–4	8–12–2	11–9	13–7	12–8–1	—	10–9	9–7
Syracuse	2–1	12–5	7–10	5–14	7–10	4–11–1	9–10	—	9–11
Toledo	3–2–1	9–5	7–13	6–14	14–6	11–6–1	7–9	11–9	—

=== Roster ===
1890 Philadelphia Athletics
Roster
Pitchers: Duke Esper; Ed Green; Horace Helmbold; Mickey Hughes; William Lackey; Sadie McMahon; Ed O'Neil; Bill Price; Ed Seward; William Stecher; John Sterling; Harry Stine; Jim Whitney	Catchers: Kid Baldwin; Bart Cantz; Macey; John Riddle; Wilbert Robinson; Infielders: Sam Campbell; Ed Carfrey; George Carman; Bill Collins; Ben Conroy; Henry Easterday; Dennis Fitzgerald; Andy Knox; Denny Lyons; George Meyers; Jack O'Brien; Al Sauter; Taylor Shafer; Pete Sweeney	Outfielders: George Crawford; Joe Daly; Pete Hasney; Joe Kappel; McBride; Ed Pabst; Blondie Purcell; Orator Shafer; Charles Snyder; Stafford; Sweigert; Curt Welch	Manager: Bill Sharsig

== Player stats ==
=== Batting ===
==== Starters by position ====
Note: Pos = Position; G = Games played; AB = At bats; H = Hits; Avg. = Batting average; HR = Home runs; RBI = Runs batted in

Pos	Player	G	AB	H	Avg.	HR	RBI
C	Wilbert Robinson	82	329	78	.237	4	42
1B	Jack O'Brien	109	433	113	.261	4	80
2B	Taylor Shafer	69	261	45	.172	0	21
SS	Ben Conroy	117	404	69	.171	0	21
3B	Denny Lyons	88	339	120	.354	7	73
OF	Orator Shafer	100	390	110	.282	1	58
OF	Curt Welch	103	396	106	.268	2	40
OF	Blondie Purcell	110	463	128	.276	2	59

==== Other batters ====
Note: G = Games played; AB = At bats; H = Hits; Avg. = Batting average; HR = Home runs; RBI = Runs batted in

Player	G	AB	H	Avg.	HR	RBI
Joe Kappel	56	208	50	.240	1	22
George Carman	27	93	16	.172	0	7
Kid Baldwin	24	90	21	.233	0	12
John Riddle	27	85	7	.082	0	2
Andy Knox	21	75	19	.253	0	8
Joe Daly	21	75	21	.280	0	7
Henry Easterday	19	68	10	.147	1	3
Pete Sweeney	14	49	8	.163	0	0
Al Sauter	14	41	4	.098	0	0
Charles Snyder	9	33	9	.273	0	4
Ed O'Neil	10	31	5	.161	0	2
Ed Pabst	8	25	10	.400	0	3
Bart Cantz	5	22	1	.045	0	1
George Meyers	5	19	3	.158	0	1
George Crawford	5	17	2	.118	0	3
Dennis Fitzgerald	2	8	2	.250	0	0
Pete Hasney	2	7	1	.143	0	0
Sam Campbell	2	5	0	.000	0	0
Ed Carfrey	1	4	1	.250	0	0
Stafford	1	2	0	.000	0	0
McBride	1	2	0	.000	0	0
Bill Collins	1	1	0	.000	0	0
Macey	1	1	0	.000	0	0

=== Pitching ===
==== Starting pitchers ====
Note: G = Games pitched; IP = Innings pitched; W = Wins; L = Losses; ERA = Earned run average; SO = Strikeouts

Player	G	IP	W	L	ERA	SO
Sadie McMahon	48	410.0	29	18	3.34	225
Ed Green	25	191.0	7	15	5.80	56
Ed Seward	21	154.0	6	12	4.73	55
Duke Esper	18	143.2	8	9	4.89	61
William Stecher	10	68.0	0	10	10.32	18
Ed O'Neil	6	52.0	0	6	9.69	17
Mickey Hughes	6	41.1	1	3	5.44	15
Bill Price	1	9.0	1	0	2.00	1
Harry Stine	1	8.0	0	1	9.00	1
Horace Helmbold	1	7.0	0	1	14.14	3
John Sterling	1	5.0	0	1	21.60	1

==== Other pitchers ====
Note: G = Games pitched; IP = Innings pitched; W = Wins; L = Losses; ERA = Earned run average; SO = Strikeouts

Player	G	IP	W	L	ERA	SO
Jim Whitney	6	40.0	2	2	5.18	6

==== Relief pitchers ====
Note: G = Games pitched; W = Wins; L = Losses; SV = Saves; ERA = Earned run average; SO = Strikeouts

Player	G	W	L	SV	ERA	SO
William Lackey	1	0	0	0	9.00	1
Curt Welch	1	0	0	0	54.00	1
