= Jack McQuaid =

American baseball player and umpire (1859–1895)

- Born: John H. McQuaid; 1859; Chicago, Illinois, U.S.
- Died: April 16, 1895 (aged 35–36); Chicago, Illinois, U.S.
- Occupation: Umpire
- Years active: 1886–1888 (AA), 1889–1894 (NL)
- Employer(s): American Association, National League

John H. McQuaid (1859 – April 16, 1895) was an American professional baseball player and umpire. He spent nine seasons umpiring in either the American Association or the National League between 1886 and 1894. He was an active major league umpire when he died just before the 1895 baseball season.

== Biography ==
He began his career in baseball as a player in the Northwestern League, where he played in 1883 and 1884. McQuaid then became an umpire in the American Association from 1886 until 1888. He then moved to the National League in 1889 until 1894.

During an 1887 game in the American Association, McQuaid was part of the first major league regular-season two-man umpiring crew. His partner that day was Bobby Mathews, a pitcher for the Philadelphia Athletics.

McQuaid was the umpire in an 1891 Boston-Chicago game that resulted in a rule change related to batters who could hit from both sides of the plate. Kid Nichols was pitching for Boston and attempting to intentionally walk Chicago's Cap Anson with two runners on base. Each time that Nichols would begin to deliver a pitch, Anson would jump to the other side of home plate. Nichols refused to pitch to Anson, so McQuaid awarded Anson first base. Nichols hit the next batter with a pitch, allowing the game-winning run to score. The game would have ended the same way if an intentional walk had been delivered, but the odd encounter resulted in a new rule that declared a batter out if he changed sides of the plate after the pitcher was set.

The 1894 season seems to have been a particularly tumultuous one for the league's umpiring staff. Three umpires quit by early July. McQuaid finished the season, but it was his last. McQuaid died suddenly on April 16, 1895, just before the 1895 season started. A funeral was held six days later in Chicago.

McQuaid umpired 952 career games, 242 of them in the American Association and 710 of them in the National League. He umpired in an American Association no-hitter (thrown by Henry Porter in 1888) and two National League no-hitters (thrown by Tom Lovett and rookie Bumpus Jones in 1891 and 1892, respectively). His brother, Mart McQuaid, played briefly in the major leagues.
