= John Sterling (pitcher) =

American baseball player (1865–1908)

- Pitcher
- Born: September 1865; Philadelphia, Pennsylvania, U.S.
- Died: November 10, 1908 (aged 43); Gloucester City, New Jersey, U.S.
- Batted: Right Threw: Right

MLB debut
- October 12, 1890, for the Philadelphia Athletics

Last MLB appearance
- October 12, 1890, for the Philadelphia Athletics

MLB statistics
- Win–loss record: 0–1
- Earned run average: 21.60
- Strikeouts: 1
- Stats at Baseball Reference

Teams
- Philadelphia Athletics (1890)

John Albert Sterling (September 1865 – November 10, 1908) was an American baseball player who played one game for the 1890 Philadelphia Athletics of the American Association. Until 2023, Sterling was known to baseball historians by only his last name.

== Early life ==
Sterling was born in Philadelphia to Jesse and Henrietta Sterling (née Brown) in September 1865. His birth registration lists his name as John Pierce Sterling. Sterling was raised in Philadelphia and was the oldest of five brothers. In the 1880 census, his middle name was given as "Albert." At fourteen years old, he was recorded as being home instead of attending school. His father, a sailmaker and Civil War veteran, was afflicted by rheumatism and his mother was a homemaker. That same year, his father was charged with "beating and abusing" his mother. His mother alleged that Mr. Sterling had knocked her down.

== Baseball career ==
Sterling began the 1888 season with a minor league club in Minneapolis. By May 22, however, he was released along with teammate Frank Graves. He next joined the Jackson, Michigan club of the Tri-State League but was released in early June along with Ed Flynn. In July, Sterling was playing for a minor league team in Ashland, Pennsylvania when he was signed by the St. Louis Browns. Before appearing in any games, however, Browns treasurer Jim Gifford arranged for him to pitch to Browns catchers Jack Boyle and Jocko Milligan. The catchers were not impressed and Sterling was given his release without having appeared in a game. The following year, Sterling returned to Pennsylvania to play for Charlie Mason's minor league Philadelphia Giants.

Prior to the 1890 season, Sterling was one of roughly 300 players who responded to a circular issued by National League president Nicholas Young, making it known that he was interested in joining the league. Sterling may also have been the pitcher for a team of locals picked to play an exhibition against the Athletics prior to the start of the 1890 season.

Sterling began 1890 with Charlie Mason's minor league club in Allentown but, by early June, he had parted ways with the dysfunctional club which would later fold midseason after Mason abandoned it in July. On June 10, 1890, The Philadelphia Inquirer reported that Sterling was seeking a tryout with manager Jack Clements of the Philadelphia Phillies. Instead, two days later, Sterling settled for a contract with Tom York's Albany club in the New York State League. York was replaced by William Primrose in early July and The Sun reported that the majority of the team's players were expected to be released. A day later, the Albany Morning Express reported that Sterling had been released, ostensibly due to drunkenness.

=== Philadelphia Athletics ===
In 1890, the Philadelphia Athletics were one of three professional baseball teams in Philadelphia, which hosted the Phillies and the Players' League club also known as the Philadelphia Athletics. By July, the club had not been able to fully pay its players. In September, William Whitaker announced the club was bankrupt and ownership was transferred to Billy Barnie, who also owned and managed the Baltimore Orioles. Barnie released most of the team's players and signed many of them to the Orioles. Others abandoned the team voluntarily. The Athletics, as a result, filled out their roster with players who had limited playing experience and who agreed to receive a portion of ticket sales instead of a salary. Sterling was one of those players. He pitched the entirety of a rain-shortened, five-inning game against the Syracuse Stars on October 12, 1890 in front of only twenty spectators in Gloucester City, New Jersey. Sterling, who pitched "in a black cloth suit, with low cut vest and white stand-up collar" allowed 12 runs in his five innings of work. Sterling would never appear in another professional baseball game. It was the final loss in a 21-game season-ending losing streak for the Athletics and the final game in franchise history. Owner and manager Bill Sharsig announced the following day that the team would be disbanded for good.

== Personal life ==
Sterling married his wife, Maggie (née Brady), in 1887. Their first son, also named John, was born in Pennsylvania in January 1891. By the late 1890s, Sterling was working as a minstrel performer, singing "comic songs" and coon songs. On June 28, 1899, Sterling's wife gave birth to their second son, William, in Gloucester City. In the 1900 census, Sterling's occupation was listed as "Musician." By that point, he was living with his family in a rented home in Gloucester City.

Sterling became active in Democratic Party politics in New Jersey in the early 20th century. In 1901, he was one of the party's nominees for Justice of the Peace for Gloucester City. In September 1904, he was nominated by the party to be the city's Overseer of the Poor. After a recount, Sterling won the position by ten votes, a margin of less than one percent. He served in that position for a year. In 1905, he was on the losing end of a ten-vote margin in the election for Constable of Gloucester City. That year, his occupation was listed in the New Jersey state census as "Laborer." Two years later, he was floated as a possible candidate for the city's Chief of Police.

=== Later life and death ===
Sterling's father died in November 1904 after suffering a paralytic stroke in an old soldiers' home in Erie, Pennsylvania, across the entire state of Pennsylvania from Sterling. In August 1908, Sterling filed a personal injury suit seeking $5,000 in damages (equivalent to $179,000 in 2025) after being seriously injured in a fall on a sidewalk in Gloucester City.

On November 10, Sterling was reported to be lying at home seriously ill. He died the same day. He was remembered in the Courier-Post as "an all-around athlete" and "quite a pugilist." He was remembered in The Philadelphia Inquirer as "a well-known minstrel and Democratic politician." His funeral was well attended by the Democrats of Gloucester City. He was interred in the city's Union Cemetery. A few days later, Sterling's mother also died at her home on the same street. The Philadelphia Inquirer, which described her as "the largest woman in Gloucester," speculated that grief over the death of her son, a "well-known minstrel and Democratic politician ... doubtlessly hastened her death."

== Identification ==
Sterling, along with McBride, Stafford and Sweigert, was one of four Athletics who appeared in their only Major League game on October 12, 1890. For years, these players were conflated with other baseball people of the era who shared their last names. Lacking any evidence to confirm these identifications, however, the Society for American Baseball Research (SABR) determined in 2007 that their biographical information would be removed and that their given names would be reclassified as unidentified. The only clue as to Sterling's identity came from the Philadelphia Inquirer's coverage of the game which identified him as a "young man of Camden." Camden County, New Jersey is across the Delaware River from Philadelphia, where Sterling was born, and home to Gloucester City, where Sterling was living by the 1890s.

In February 2023, Sterling was identified for the first time in a report by SABR. Researchers tracked him from team to team between 1888 and 1890 and were able to corroborate many details of his life via his obituary and genealogical records. SABR published a biography of Sterling by Tim Hagerty on its website that year.
