= Harry Stine =

Harry Stine may refer to:

- Harry Stine (businessman) (born 1941/1942), American billionaire businessman
- G. Harry Stine (1928–1997), American founding figure of model rocketry
- Harry Stine (baseball) (1864–1924), American pitcher in Major League Baseball
