= Andrew Knox =

Andrew Knox may refer to:

- Andrew Knox (bishop) (1559–1633), Scottish churchman, Bishop of the Isles and Bishop of Raphoe
- Andrew Knox (Canadian politician) (1866–1946), Irish-born farmer and political figure in Saskatchewan, Canada
- Andrew Knox (1709–1774), Irish MP for County Donegal
- Andrew Knox (1766–1840), Irish MP for Strabane
- Andy Knox (1864–1940), Major League Baseball first baseman
