= Charles Snyder =

Charles Snyder may refer to:

- C. B. J. Snyder (Charles B. J. Snyder, 1860–1945), American architect
- Charles Snyder (baseball) (1873–1901), American catcher and right fielder in Major League Baseball
- Charles P. Snyder (politician) (Charles Philip Snyder, 1847–1915), West Virginia lawyer, politician
- Charles P. Snyder (admiral) (Charles Philip Snyder, 1879–1964), first Inspector General of the United States Navy during World War II
- Charles R. Snyder (1944–2006), University of Kansas professor
- Charles A. Snyder, Pennsylvania politician
- Charlie Snyder (American football) (c. 1922 – 2007), head football coach at Marshall University, 1959–1967
- Pop Snyder (Charles N. Snyder, 1854–1924), American catcher and manager in Major League Baseball
