= Pete Sweeney =

American baseball player (1863–1901)

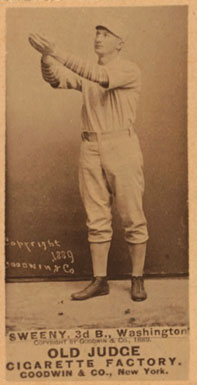
- Third baseman
- Born: December 31, 1863; San Mateo, California, U.S.
- Died: August 22, 1901 (aged 37); San Francisco, California, U.S.
- Batted: Right Threw: Right

MLB debut
- September 28, 1888, for the Washington Nationals

Last MLB appearance
- October 2, 1890, for the Philadelphia Athletics

MLB statistics
- Batting average: .209
- Home runs: 1
- Runs scored: 53
- Stats at Baseball Reference

Teams
- Washington Nationals (1888–1889); St. Louis Browns (1889–1890); Louisville Colonels (1890); Philadelphia Athletics (1890)

Peter Jay Sweeney (December 31, 1863 – August 22, 1901) was an American third baseman in Major League Baseball in the 19th century. His professional career stretched from 1879 through 1897, though only 1888–1890 were spent in the Major Leagues.

== Sources ==
- Career statistics from Baseball Reference · Baseball Reference (Minors) · Retrosheet · Baseball Almanac
