= Pete Hasney =

English baseball player (1864–1908)

- Outfielder
- Born: May 26, 1864; England
- Died: May 24, 1908 (aged 43); Philadelphia, Pennsylvania, U.S.
- Batted: Unknown Threw: Unknown

MLB debut
- September 13, 1890, for the Philadelphia Athletics

Last MLB appearance
- September 13, 1890, for the Philadelphia Athletics

MLB statistics
- Batting average: .143
- Home runs: 0
- Runs batted in: 0
- Stats at Baseball Reference

Teams
- Philadelphia Athletics (1890)

Peter James Hasney (May 26, 1864 – May 24, 1908) was an English born Major League Baseball outfielder. He played for the Philadelphia Athletics of the American Association in 1890, their last year of existence.
