= Bill Price (baseball) =

American baseball player (1863–1922)

- Pitcher
- Born: June 10, 1863; Philadelphia, Pennsylvania, U.S.
- Died: August 7, 1922 (aged 59); Philadelphia, Pennsylvania, U.S.
- Batted: Unknown Threw: Unknown

MLB debut
- April 27, 1890, for the Philadelphia Athletics

Last MLB appearance
- April 27, 1890, for the Philadelphia Athletics

MLB statistics
- Win–loss record: 1–0
- Earned run average: 2.00
- Strikeouts: 1
- Stats at Baseball Reference

Teams
- Philadelphia Athletics (1890)

William Price (June 10, 1863 – August 7, 1922) was an American pitcher in Major League Baseball. He played for the Philadelphia Athletics of the American Association in one game on April 27, 1890.

== Sources ==
- Career statistics from Baseball Reference · Baseball Reference (Minors) · Retrosheet · Baseball Almanac
