= Joe Daly (baseball) =

American baseball player (1868–1943)

- Outfielder/Catcher
- Born: September 21, 1868; Conshohocken, Pennsylvania, U.S.
- Died: March 21, 1943 (aged 74); Philadelphia, Pennsylvania, U.S.
- Batted: Unknown Threw: Right

MLB debut
- September 19, 1890, for the Philadelphia Athletics

Last MLB appearance
- August 13, 1892, for the Boston Beaneaters

MLB statistics
- Batting average: .269
- Home runs: 0
- Runs batted in: 7
- Stats at Baseball Reference

Teams
- Philadelphia Athletics (1890); Cleveland Spiders (1891); Boston Beaneaters (1892)

Joseph John Daly (September 21, 1868 – March 21, 1943) was an American Major League Baseball outfielder and catcher. He played for the Philadelphia Athletics of the American Association in 1890, their last year of existence. He later played in one game for the 1891 Cleveland Spiders and one game for the 1892 Boston Beaneaters.

His brother, Tom Daly, also played professional baseball.
