= List of 19th-century Major League Baseball players with unidentified given names =

Thirty-one individuals who played professional baseball at the major league level before 1900 lack identified given names (there are hundreds of other players of which this is true from the twentieth-century Negro leagues). All 31 played between 1872 and 1892; 17 played in the National Association, which folded in 1875. Identification of players remains difficult due to a lack of biographical information. A Brooklyn, New York, directory, for instance, lists more than 30 men who could be the professional player "Stoddard". Philadelphia Athletics manager Bill Sharsig signed three of the 31, "local players" McBride, Stafford and Sweigert, for Philadelphia's last game of the season against the Syracuse Stars on October 12, 1890. McBride, Philadelphia's center fielder, and Stafford, the team's right fielder, both failed to reach base, but left fielder Sweigert reached base on a walk and stole a base. Society for American Baseball Research writer Bill Carle "doubt[s] we will ever be able to identify them". David Nemec has commented on this phenomenon with both major league and minor league players, noting, for example, that a McGuire (not on this list because he was a minor league player) is probably the player with an unknown first name whose appearances came closest to the twentieth century.

Despite their relative anonymity, several of these players received media coverage describing their games. In 1872, The New York Times described O'Rourke as a new player on Eckford of Brooklyn who "appear[ed] to be an improvement over the recent incumbents": in his only game, the pitcher allowed 15 runs to score in a complete game against the Troy Trojans. Lewis received a mention in Sporting Life (pictured) that recapped his performance, and another in the Pittsburgh Press, with a synopsis that summarized the game as "one of the greatest slugging matches ever seen since curve pitching came into vogue".

Of the 31 athletes with an unidentified given name, Baltimore Monumentals right fielder Scott played in the most games at the major league level, with 13, followed by Wills with 9. Scott also has the most hits among these players, with 12, followed by both Wills and Jones with 5 each. Among pitchers, Lewis has the highest earned run average, 60.00, whereas Edwards has the lowest, 4.50.

== Players without identified given names ==
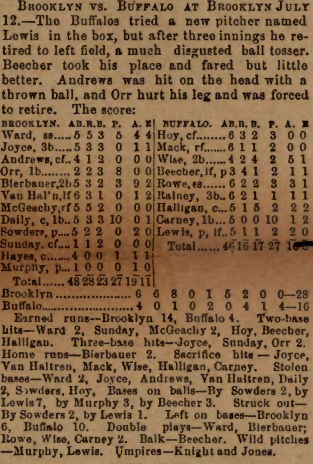
A Sporting Life clip that describes Lewis as a "much disgusted ball tosser", taken from an article dated July 19, 1890.

=== National Association ===
==== 1872–1874 ====
Name	Position	Team	League	Year	Ref
Higby	Right fielder	Brooklyn Atlantics	National Association	1872	
Higby	Summary: 1 game played; 4 plate appearances; 1 error				
O'Rourke	Pitcher	Eckford of Brooklyn	National Association	1872	
O'Rourke	Summary: 0–1 win–loss record; 9.0 innings pitched; 8.00 earned run average; 15 runs allowed				
Quinlan	Shortstop	Philadelphia White Stockings	National Association	1874	
Quinlan	Summary: 1 game played; 1 hit; 1 run batted in				
Wood	Second baseman	Baltimore Canaries	National Association	1874	
Wood	Summary: 1 game played; 5 plate appearances; 0 hits				

==== 1875 ====
Name	Position	Team	League	Year	Ref
Boland	Third baseman	Brooklyn Atlantics	National Association	1875	
Boland	Summary: 1 game played; 4 plate appearances; 1 error				
Booth	Shortstop	New Haven Elm Citys	National Association	1875	
Booth	Summary: 1 game played; 2 plate appearances; 1 error				
Edwards	Center fielder / Pitcher	Brooklyn Atlantics	National Association	1875	
Edwards	Summary: 1 game played; 5 plate appearances; 1 hit; 0–1 win–loss record; 2.0 innings pitched; 4.50 earned run average				
Evans	Left fielder	New Haven Elm Citys	National Association	1875	
Evans	Summary: 1 game played; 2 hits; 1 run batted in				
Hellings	Second baseman	Brooklyn Atlantics	National Association	1875	
Hellings	Summary: 1 game played; 4 plate appearances; 1 hit				
Quinn	Outfielder / Shortstop	Brooklyn Atlantics	National Association	1875	
Quinn	Summary: 2 games played; 1 hit; 2 runs				
Shaffer	Right fielder	Brooklyn Atlantics	National Association	1875	
Shaffer	Summary: 1 game played; 4 plate appearances; 1 error				
Sheridan	Left fielder	Brooklyn Atlantics	National Association	1875	
Sheridan	Summary: 1 game played; 4 plate appearances; 0 hits				
D. Smith	Second baseman	Brooklyn Atlantics	National Association	1875	
D. Smith	Summary: Misidentified until 2023 as Thomas N. Smith: 3 games played; 13 plate appearances; 1 hit				
Stoddard	Outfielder	Brooklyn Atlantics	National Association	1875	
Stoddard	Summary: 2 games played; 9 plate appearances; 1 hit				
Sullivan	Right fielder	New Haven Elm Citys	National Association	1875	
Sullivan	Summary: 2 games played; 3 hits; 3 runs batted in				

=== Union Association, American Association and Players' League ===
==== 1884–1885 ====
Name	Position	Team	League	Year	Ref
Carroll	Left fielder	Washington Nationals	Union Association	1884	
Carroll	Summary: 4 games played; 16 plate appearances; 4 hits; 4 errors				
Franklin	Center fielder	Washington Nationals	Union Association	1884	
Franklin	Summary: 1 game played; 3 plate appearances; 2 putouts				
Jones	Left fielder	Washington Nationals	American Association	1884	
Jones	Summary: 4 games played; 5 hits; .294 batting average				
McRemer	Right fielder	Washington Nationals	Union Association	1884	
McRemer	Summary: 1 game played; 3 plate appearances; 0 hits				
Murphy	Catcher / Left fielder	Boston Reds	Union Association	1884	
Murphy	Summary: 2 games played; 4 plate appearances; 1 walk				
Scott	Right fielder / Third baseman	Baltimore Monumentals	Union Association	1884	
Scott	Summary: 13 games played; 12 hits; 1 home run				
Smith	Pitcher / Right fielder	Baltimore Monumentals	Union Association	1884	
Smith	Summary: 1 game played; 5 plate appearances; 1 hits; 0–0 win–loss record; 6.0 innings pitched; 9.00 earned run average				
Wills	Center fielder	Washington Nationals	American Association; Kansas City Cowboys (UA)	1884	
Wills	Summary: 9 games played; 36 plate appearances; 5 hits				
Jones	Third baseman	New York Metropolitans	American Association	1885	
Jones	Summary: 1 game played; 4 plate appearances; 1 hit				

==== 1890–1892 ====
Name	Position	Team	League	Year	Ref
Lewis	Left fielder / Pitcher	Buffalo Bisons	Players' League	1890	
Lewis	Summary: For broader coverage of this topic, see 1890 Buffalo Bisons season § Brooklyn vs Buffalo game and the story of Lewis.: 1 game played; 5 plate appearances; 1 hit; 0–1 win–loss record; 3.0 innings pitched; 60.00 earned run average				
Macey	Catcher	Philadelphia Athletics	American Association	1890	
Macey	Summary: 1 game played; 1 plate appearance; 0 hits				
McBride	Center fielder	Philadelphia Athletics	American Association	1890	
McBride	Summary: 1 game played; 2 plate appearances; 0 hits				
Stafford	Right fielder	Philadelphia Athletics	American Association	1890	
Stafford	Summary: 1 game played; 2 plate appearances; 0 hits				
Sweigert	Left fielder	Philadelphia Athletics	American Association	1890	
Sweigert	Summary: 1 game played; 2 plate appearances; 1 stolen base				
Leonard	Right fielder	St. Louis Browns	American Association	1892	
Leonard	Summary: 1 game played; 1 walk; 1 stolen base				
