= Dennis Fitzgerald (baseball) =

English baseball player (1865–1936)

- Shortstop
- Born: March 1865; England
- Died: October 16, 1936 (aged 71); New Haven, Connecticut, U.S.
- Batted: Unknown Threw: Unknown

MLB debut
- April 17, 1890, for the Philadelphia Athletics

Last MLB appearance
- April 18, 1890, for the Philadelphia Athletics

MLB statistics
- Batting average: .250
- Home runs: 0
- Runs batted in: 0
- Stats at Baseball Reference

Teams
- Philadelphia Athletics (1890)

Dennis S. Fitzgerald (March 1865 – October 16, 1936) was an English born Major League Baseball infielder. He played for the Philadelphia Athletics of the American Association in 1890, their last year of existence.
