= Ben Conroy =

American baseball player (1871–1937)

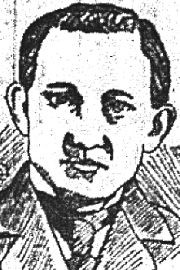
- Shortstop
- Born: March 14, 1871; Philadelphia, Pennsylvania
- Died: November 25, 1937 (aged 66); Philadelphia, Pennsylvania

MLB debut
- April 21, 1890, for the Philadelphia Athletics

Last MLB appearance
- October 4, 1890, for the Philadelphia Athletics

MLB statistics
- Batting average: .171
- Home runs: 0
- Runs batted in: 21
- Stats at Baseball Reference

Teams
- Philadelphia Athletics (1890)

Bernard Patrick Conroy (March 14, 1871 – November 25, 1937) was a professional baseball player. He played one season in Major League Baseball, primarily as an infielder.

As a nineteen-year-old, Conroy was the starting shortstop for the Philadelphia Athletics of the American Association in 1890, their last year of existence. He led the team in games played with 117.
