= William Stecher =

American baseball player (1869–1926)

- Pitcher
- Born: October 20, 1869; Riverside Township, New Jersey
- Died: December 26, 1926 (aged 57); Riverside Township, New Jersey
- Batted: Unknown Threw: Right

MLB debut
- September 6, 1890, for the Philadelphia Athletics

Last MLB appearance
- October 9, 1890, for the Philadelphia Athletics

MLB statistics
- Win–loss record: 0-10
- Earned run average: 10.32
- Strikeouts: 18
- Stats at Baseball Reference

Teams
- Philadelphia Athletics (1890)

William Theodore Stecher (October 20, 1869 – December 26, 1926) was a professional baseball player who played pitcher in the Major Leagues in 1890 for the Philadelphia Athletics.
