= Lew Simmons =

American baseball manager

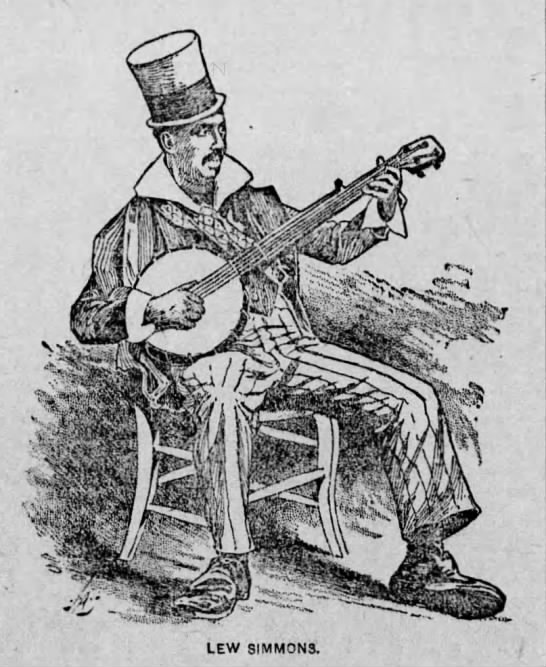
- Lew Simmons, a 19th century musician who played minstrel music was a baseball manager for the Athletic baseball team of Philadelphia.
- Manager
- Born: August 27, 1838; New Castle, Pennsylvania, U.S.
- Died: September 2, 1911; Reading, Pennsylvania, U.S.
- Batted: Unknown Threw: Unknown
- August 26,

MLB statistics
- Games: 98
- Win–loss record: 41 – 55
- Winning %: .427

Teams
- Philadelphia Athletics (1886)

Lewis Simmons (August 27, 1838 – September 2, 1911) was an American Major League Baseball (MLB) manager for the 1886 Philadelphia Athletics of the American Association. He was also a minstrel who performed in vaudeville, playing on the banjo.

Preceded by Harry Stovey	Philadelphia Athletics (AA) Managers; 1886	Succeeded by Bill Sharsig
