= William Lackey =

American baseball player (1870–1941)

- Pitcher
- Born: December 8, 1870; St. Albans, West Virginia
- Died: May 15, 1941 (aged 70); Columbus, Ohio
- Batted: Unknown Threw: Unknown

MLB debut
- October 2, 1890, for the Philadelphia Athletics

Last MLB appearance
- October 2, 1890, for the Philadelphia Athletics

MLB statistics
- Win–loss record: 0–0
- Earned run average: 9.00
- Strikeouts: 1
- Stats at Baseball Reference

Teams
- Philadelphia Athletics (1890)

William D. Lackey (December 8, 1870 – May 15, 1941) was a pitcher in Major League Baseball who played briefly during the 1890 season. He was born in St. Albans, West Virginia. Formerly known as just Lackey, also is known as Bill William D., Bill Lackey or William Lackey.

Lackey was a 19 years old amateur pitcher when he debuted with the Philadelphia Athletics of the American Association. On October 2, 1890 he made a relief appearance, giving up four runs (two earned) on one hit and three walks while striking out one in 2.0 innings of work. He posted a 9.00 ERA and did not have a decision. As a batter, he was hitless in his only at-bat, and never appeared in a major league game again.

Lackey died in Columbus, Ohio, at the age of 70 of coronary thrombosis.
