= Curt Welch =

American baseball player (1862–1896)

- 1887 baseball card of Welch
- Center fielder
- Born: February 11, 1862; East Liverpool, Ohio, U.S.
- Died: August 29, 1896 (aged 34); East Liverpool, Ohio, U.S.
- Batted: Right Threw: Right

MLB debut
- May 1, 1884, for the Toledo Blue Stockings

Last MLB appearance
- May 23, 1893, for the Louisville Colonels

MLB statistics
- Batting average: .263
- Home runs: 16
- Runs batted in: 503
- Stolen bases: 453
- Stats at Baseball Reference

Teams
- Toledo Blue Stockings (1884); St. Louis Browns (1885–1887); Philadelphia Athletics (1888–1890); Baltimore Orioles (1890–1892); Cincinnati Reds (1892); Louisville Colonels (1893)

Curtis Benton Welch (February 10, 1862 – August 29, 1896) was an American Major League Baseball center fielder for the Toledo Blue Stockings, St. Louis Browns, Philadelphia Athletics, Baltimore Orioles, Cincinnati Reds, and Louisville Colonels.

== Career ==
Welch started his professional baseball career in 1883 with Toledo of the Northwestern League and stayed with the club when it moved to the American Association the following year. In 1885, he joined the St. Louis Browns (today's Cardinals). Welch scored the series-winning run in extra innings of game 6 of the 1886 World Series in a close play at the plate famous among baseball fans of his generation as the "$15,000 slide," that number being an estimate of the total gate receipts in the winner-take-all Series.

After three seasons with St. Louis, Welch went to Philadelphia and had a career-high .282 batting average in 1888. He played for the Athletics until 1890 and then had short stints with the Orioles, Reds, and Colonels. His major league career ended in 1893, and he spent the next two seasons with the Eastern League's Syracuse Stars.

Welch led the AA in hit by pitches in 1888, 1890, and 1891, and he ranked third in stolen bases in 1886 and 1888. He was regarded as one of the best defensive center fielders of the 19th century. In the 2010 book The New Bill James Historical Baseball Abstract, Bill James ranked Welch as the 83rd greatest center fielder of all time.

Welch sometimes kept a case of beer in the outfield behind a billboard, taking a drink between innings. Welch's career was damaged by his drinking, and he died in 1896.

== See also ==
- List of Major League Baseball annual doubles leaders
- List of Major League Baseball career stolen bases leaders
