= Horace Helmbold =

American baseball player (1867–1939)

- Pitcher
- Born: August 27, 1867; Philadelphia, Pennsylvania
- Died: November 18, 1939 (aged 72); Lake Lure, North Carolina
- Batted: Unknown Threw: Unknown

MLB debut
- October 11, 1890, for the Philadelphia Athletics

Last MLB appearance
- October 11, 1890, for the Philadelphia Athletics

MLB statistics
- Win–loss record: 0–1
- Earned run average: 14.14
- Strikeouts: 3
- Stats at Baseball Reference

Teams
- Philadelphia Athletics (1890)

Horace Willing Helmbold (August 27, 1867 – November 18, 1939) was a Major League Baseball pitcher who played in 1890 with the Philadelphia Athletics.

Helmbold made his lone appearance on October 11 against the Syracuse Stars, pitching 7.0 innings and allowing 11 earned runs to earn the loss.
