= Ed O'Neil (baseball) =

American baseball player (1859–1892)

- Pitcher
- Born: March 11, 1859; Fall River, Massachusetts, U.S.
- Died: September 30, 1892 (aged 33); Fall River, Massachusetts, U.S.
- Batted: Unknown Threw: Right

MLB debut
- June 20, 1890, for the Toledo Maumees

Last MLB appearance
- October 12, 1890, for the Philadelphia Athletics

MLB statistics
- Win–loss record: 0-8
- Earned run average: 9.29
- Strikeouts: 19
- Stats at Baseball Reference

Teams
- Toledo Maumees (1890); Philadelphia Athletics (1890)

Edward J. O'Neil (March 11, 1859, in Fall River, Massachusetts – September 30, 1892, in Fall River, Massachusetts) was an American pitcher in Major League Baseball. He played parts of the 1890 season for two different teams in the American Association.

== Sources ==
- Career statistics from Baseball Reference · Baseball Reference (Minors) · Retrosheet · Baseball Almanac
