= Jim Whitney =

American baseball player (1857–1891)

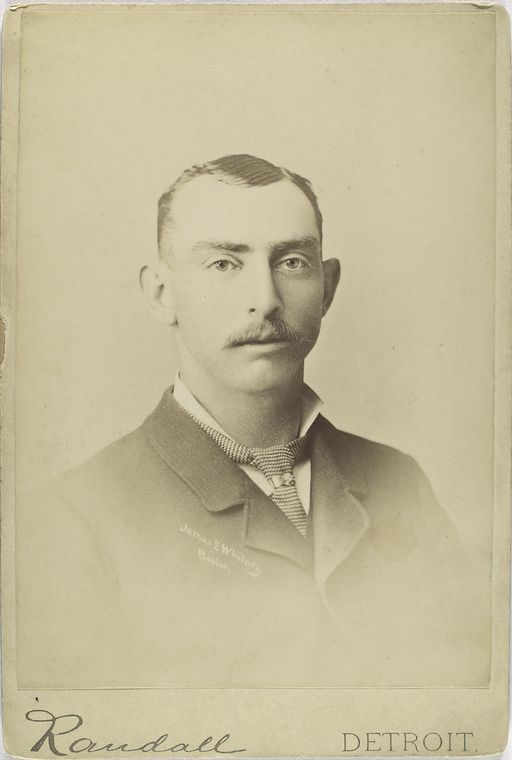
- Whitney in 1881
- Pitcher
- Born: November 10, 1857; Conklin, New York, U.S.
- Died: May 21, 1891 (aged 33); Binghamton, New York, U.S.
- Batted: Left Threw: Right

MLB debut
- May 2, 1881, for the Boston Red Caps

Last MLB appearance
- July 16, 1890, for the Philadelphia Athletics

MLB statistics
- Win–loss record: 191–204
- Earned run average: 2.97
- Strikeouts: 1,571
- Stats at Baseball Reference

Teams
- Boston Red Caps/Beaneaters (1881–1885); Kansas City Cowboys (1886); Washington Nationals (1887–1888); Indianapolis Hoosiers (1889); Philadelphia Athletics (1890)

Career highlights and awards
- NL wins leader (1881); NL strikeout leader (1883)

James Evans "Grasshopper Jim" Whitney (November 10, 1857 – May 21, 1891) was an American professional baseball player. He was a right-handed pitcher over parts of ten seasons (1881–1890) with the Boston Red Caps/Beaneaters, Kansas City Cowboys, Washington Nationals, Indianapolis Hoosiers and Philadelphia Athletics (AA). He was the National League strikeout champion in 1883 with the Boston Beaneaters.

== Early life ==
Whitney was born in Conklin, New York, and he had a brother named Charlie with whom he played baseball. When the brothers played on the same teams, each could serve as a pitcher or a catcher, so one sibling was often pitching to the other. Charlie Whitney played independent professional baseball.

== Career ==
Playing with the semi-pro Binghamton Crickets before minor league stints in Oswego, New York, Omaha, and San Francisco, Whitney debuted in the major leagues for Harry Wright's 1881 Boston Red Caps, and he worked hard that season, throwing 57 complete games and pitching 552 innings that year. A Boston journalist called Whitney "the swiftest pitcher in the league". Some accounts describe that Whitney was disliked by umpires, who said that he would spend much of the game complaining about calls that did not go in his favor.

Whitney had unique pitching mechanics. In 19th century baseball, the ball was delivered from a rectangular pitcher's box six feet in length. Pitchers would sometimes hop forward within the box before releasing the ball, and some would leap into the air during the process. Batters made fun of Whitney when he did this, giving him the nickname "Grasshopper Jim", but Whitney's pitching was effective for several years.

For his career, Whitney compiled a 191–204 record in 413 appearances, with a 2.97 ERA and 1,571 strikeouts. During his five seasons with the Boston franchise (now the Atlanta Braves), he ranks 4th in franchise history in ERA (2.49), 3rd in WHIP (1.082), 9th in innings pitched (2263 2/3), 8th in strikeouts (1,157), 9th in games started (254), 4th in complete games (242), 1st in strikeout to walk ratio (5.03), 7th in losses (121), and 2nd in wild pitches (162).

== Death ==
Whitney died in 1891 in Binghamton, New York, at the home of his father, Rufus Whitney. Tuberculosis was the cause of death.

== See also ==
- List of Major League Baseball annual saves leaders
- List of Major League Baseball annual strikeout leaders
- List of Major League Baseball annual wins leaders
