= Mickey Hughes =

American baseball player (1866–1931)

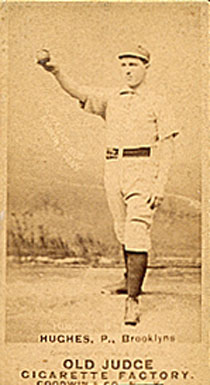
- Baseball card of Hughes
- Pitcher
- Born: October 25, 1866; New York City, U.S.
- Died: April 10, 1931 (aged 64); Jersey City, New Jersey, U.S.
- Batted: Right Threw: Right

MLB debut
- April 22, 1888, for the Brooklyn Bridegrooms

Last MLB appearance
- August 28, 1890, for the Philadelphia Athletics

MLB statistics
- Win–loss record: 39–28
- Earned run average: 3.22
- Strikeouts: 250
- Stats at Baseball Reference

Teams
- Brooklyn Bridegrooms (1888–1890); Philadelphia Athletics (1890)

Career highlights and awards
- 1889 American Association championship

Michael F. Hughes (October 25, 1866 – April 10, 1931) was an American Major League Baseball pitcher from 1888 to 1890.

Although his career was short, the New York City native did have one season worth noting, his rookie season in 1888. That season, he recorded 25 victories for the second place Brooklyn Bridegrooms. He finished his three-season career with 39 wins, 28 losses, and a 3.22 earned run average.

Hughes died in Jersey City, New Jersey at the age of 64, and was buried in Holy Name Cemetery in Jersey City.

Preceded by Bob Caruthers	Brooklyn Bridegrooms; Opening Day starting pitcher 1889	Succeeded by Bob Caruthers
