= George Meyers =

American baseball player (1865–1943)

- Third baseman
- Born: February 14, 1865; Philadelphia, Pennsylvania
- Died: November 12, 1943 (aged 78); Philadelphia, Pennsylvania
- Batted: Unknown Threw: Unknown

MLB debut
- August 30, 1890, for the Philadelphia Athletics

Last MLB appearance
- October 4, 1890, for the Philadelphia Athletics

MLB statistics
- Batting average: .158
- Home runs: 0
- Runs batted in: 1
- Stats at Baseball Reference

Teams
- Philadelphia Athletics (1890)

John George Meyers (February 14, 1865 – November 12, 1943) was an American Major League Baseball third baseman. He played for the Philadelphia Athletics of the American Association in 1890, their last year of existence.
