= George Crawford (baseball) =

American baseball player

- Outfielder
- Batted: Unknown Threw: Unknown

MLB debut
- October 8, 1890, for the Philadelphia Athletics

Last MLB appearance
- October 12, 1890, for the Philadelphia Athletics

MLB statistics
- Batting average: .118
- Home runs: 0
- Runs batted in: 3
- Stats at Baseball Reference

Teams
- Philadelphia Athletics (1890)

George Crawford was a Major League Baseball outfielder. He played for the Philadelphia Athletics of the American Association in 1890, their last year of existence.
