= Denny Lyons =

American baseball player (1866–1929)

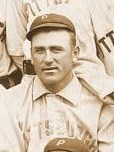
- Lyons in 1896
- Third baseman
- Born: March 12, 1866; Cincinnati, Ohio, US
- Died: January 2, 1929 (aged 62); West Covington, Kentucky, US
- Batted: Right Threw: Right

MLB debut
- September 18, 1885, for the Providence Grays

Last MLB appearance
- July 23, 1897, for the Pittsburgh Pirates

MLB statistics
- Batting average: .310
- Home runs: 62
- Runs batted in: 756
- Stats at Baseball Reference

Teams
- Providence Grays (1885); Philadelphia Athletics (1886–1890); St. Louis Browns (1891); New York Giants (1892); Pittsburgh Pirates (1893–1894); St. Louis Browns (1895); Pittsburgh Pirates (1896–1897)

Dennis Patrick Aloysius Lyons (March 12, 1866 – January 2, 1929) was an American Major League Baseball player. He played third base for the Providence Grays (1885), Philadelphia Athletics (1886–90), St. Louis Browns (1891), New York Giants (1892), Pittsburgh Pirates (1893–94 and 1896–97), and St. Louis Browns (1895).

Lyons was born in Cincinnati. He reached base by a hit or a walk in 52 consecutive games in 1887. Lyons led the American Association in on-base percentage (.461), slugging percentage (.531) and OPS (.992) in 1890.

In 1123 games over 13 seasons, Lyons posted a .310 batting average (1334-for-4300) with 933 runs, 244 doubles, 69 triples, 62 home runs, 756 RBIs, 224 stolen bases, 623 bases on balls, .407 on-base percentage and .442 slugging percentage.

He died in West Covington, Kentucky, at the age of 62.

== Pro career ==
Denny Lyons began his pro career when he was 19 for the Columbus Stars of the Southern League in 1885. Later that year, he made his debut in the major leagues for the Providence Grays of the National League. He appeared in just four games, serving as an understudy to regular third baseman Jerry Denny. Lyons' first stay in the major leagues would be brief. The Grays were a subpar team, one year removed from winning what is now recognized as the very first "World Series" the Grays were having financial issues and on the field, they struggled under the guidance of manager Frank Bancroft and the franchise folded after the 1885 season.

In 1886, Lyons was back in the minor leagues, playing for the Atlanta Atlantas of the Southern Association. During his stay in Atlanta, he batted .327 while appearing in 79 games. His bat caught the attention of the Philadelphia Athletics and they purchased his contract from Atlanta. Once again, Lyons was the understudy, this time to journeyman infielder Jack Gleason. At the end of the season, Gleason was given his release and Lyons took over as Philadelphia's regular third baseman. Though the Athletics struggled to win on the field, Lyons was one of the team's best players, leading the team in batting with a .367 average. In 1887, Lyons had a 52-game hitting streak, which would be the all-time records. However, since 1887 was the lone season in which walks were considered hits, this streak is not recognized.

In 1888, the Athletics had a winning season, and finished third in the standings, and for the second straight year, Lyons led the team in batting. He repeated this feat in 1889 as well. The 1890 season did not go well for the Athletics. The team finished in eighth place and then jumped from the American Association to the ill-fated Players League. In 1891, Lyons signed with the St. Louis Browns, a team managed by future owner of Chicago White Sox, Charles Comiskey. Other key players for the Browns that season were future hall of fame outfielder Thomas McCarthy, and Billy Hoy, better known as Dummy Hoy who was a star outfielder despite being deaf since birth. In his lone season in St. Louis, Lyons not only led the team in batting, but also showed a little power at the plate as well, leading the team with 11 home runs.

The next season, Lyons jumped leagues over to the National League, signing with the New York Giants. Though his batting average dipped (Lyons only hit .257) he still maintained his power, tying with Buck Ewing for the most home runs on the team with 8. From 1893 till 1897, Lyons spent time with the Pittsburgh Pirates and St. Louis. Browns. Lyons still had his stroke at the plate, batting over .300 for a few of those seasons, his stay in the major leagues was coming to an end. On July 23, 1897, Lyons played in his last major league contest, an 8–7 loss to the Baltimore Orioles.

A fastball from pitcher Amos Rusie broke several of Lyons' fingers. In 1898 Lyons appeared in several games for Omaha Omahogs/St. Joseph Saints of the class A Western League and finished his career as an active player the following season with the Wheeling Stogies of the Interstate League. He would become a manager and part time player for the Beaumont Oil Gushers of the class C South Texas League in 1903. At the age of 40, Lyons would spend his last year in organized baseball as a manager of the Lake Charles Creoles, also a member of the class C South Texas league.

On January 2, 1929, Denny Lyons died.

== See also ==
- List of Major League Baseball career on-base percentage leaders
- List of Major League Baseball single-game hits leaders
- List of St. Louis Cardinals team records
