= Ed Green (baseball) =

American baseball player (1860–1912)

- Pitcher / Infielder
- Born: January 1860; Millville, New Jersey, U.S.
- Died: November 1, 1912 (aged 52); Philadelphia, Pennsylvania, U.S.
- Batted: Unknown Threw: Unknown

MLB debut
- April 22, 1890, for the Philadelphia Athletics

Last MLB appearance
- October 11, 1890, for the Philadelphia Athletics

MLB statistics
- Win–loss record: 7–15
- Earned run average: 5.80
- Strikeouts: 56
- Stats at Baseball Reference

Teams
- Philadelphia Athletics (1890)

Edward M. Green (January 1860 – November 1, 1912) was an American pitcher in Major League Baseball. He played for the Philadelphia Athletics of the American Association during the 1890 season.

Green began his professional career with in 1884 with Chambersburg and York. His most productive years in the minors may have been in 1886, 1888 and 1889 when he pitched at least 184 innings each season. He had an earned run average under 2.69 for each of the three seasons as well.

Green only played one season (1890) in the major leagues. His final two years (1891 and 1892) were spent in the minor leagues.

== Sources ==
- Career statistics from Baseball Reference · Retrosheet · Baseball Almanac
