= Duke Esper =

American baseball player (1867–1910)

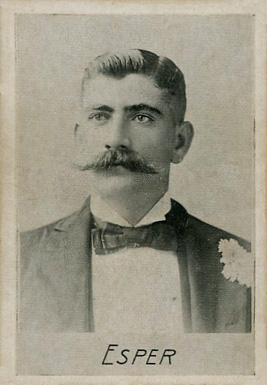
- Pitcher
- Born: July 28, 1868; Salem, New Jersey, U.S.
- Died: August 31, 1910 (aged 42); Philadelphia, Pennsylvania, U.S.
- Batted: Unknown Threw: Left

MLB debut
- April 18, 1890, for the Philadelphia Athletics

Last MLB appearance
- July 12, 1898, for the St. Louis Browns

MLB statistics
- Win–loss record: 101–100
- Earned run average: 4.39
- Strikeouts: 453
- Stats at Baseball Reference

Teams
- Philadelphia Athletics (1890); Pittsburgh Alleghenys (1890); Philadelphia Phillies (1890–1892); Pittsburgh Pirates (1892); Washington Senators (1893–1894); Baltimore Orioles (1894–1896); St. Louis Browns (1897–1898)

Charles H. "Duke" Esper (July 28, 1867 – August 31, 1910) was an American professional baseball player who played pitcher in the Major Leagues from 1890 to 1898. Esper played for the Philadelphia Athletics, Pittsburgh Pirates, Philadelphia Phillies, Baltimore Orioles, Washington Senators, and St. Louis Browns. Esper pitched 1727.2 innings, winning 101 games and losing 100.
