= George Carman (baseball) =

American baseball player (1866–1929)

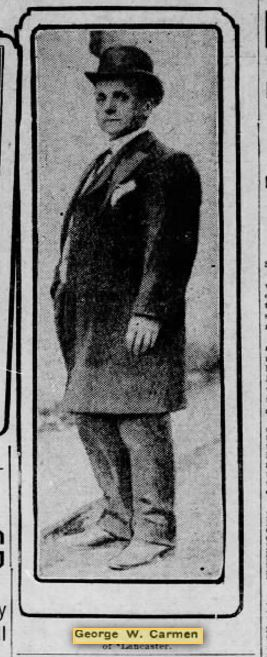
- Shortstop/Outfielder
- Born: March 29, 1866; Philadelphia, Pennsylvania, U.S.
- Died: June 16, 1929 (aged 63); Lancaster, Pennsylvania, U.S.
- Batted: Unknown Threw: Unknown

MLB debut
- September 4, 1890, for the Philadelphia Athletics

Last MLB appearance
- October 12, 1890, for the Philadelphia Athletics

MLB statistics
- Batting average: .172
- Home runs: 0
- Runs batted in: 7
- Stats at Baseball Reference

Teams
- Philadelphia Athletics (1890)

George Wartman Carman (March 29, 1866 – June 16, 1929) was an American Major League Baseball shortstop. He played for the Philadelphia Athletics of the American Association in 1890, their last year of existence.
