= Al Sauter =

American baseball player (1868–1928)

- Third baseman
- Born: September 2, 1868; Philadelphia, Pennsylvania, U.S.
- Died: July 15, 1928 (aged 59); Ocean City, New Jersey, U.S.
- Batted: Unknown Threw: Unknown

MLB debut
- September 8, 1890, for the Philadelphia Athletics

Last MLB appearance
- October 11, 1890, for the Philadelphia Athletics

MLB statistics
- Batting average: .098
- Home runs: 0
- Runs batted in: 0
- Stats at Baseball Reference

Teams
- Philadelphia Athletics (1890)

Albert C. Sauter (September 2, 1868 – July 15, 1928) was an American Major League Baseball (MLB) infielder. He played for the Philadelphia Athletics of the American Association in 1890, their last year of existence.
