= Andy Knox =

American baseball player (1864–1940)

- First baseman
- Born: January 6, 1864; Philadelphia, Pennsylvania, U.S.
- Died: September 14, 1940 (aged 76); Philadelphia, Pennsylvania, U.S.
- Batted: Right Threw: Right

MLB debut
- September 19, 1890, for the Philadelphia Athletics

Last MLB appearance
- October 12, 1890, for the Philadelphia Athletics

MLB statistics
- Batting average: .253
- Home runs: 0
- Runs batted in: 8
- Stats at Baseball Reference

Teams
- Philadelphia Athletics (1890)

Andrew Jackson Knox (January 6, 1864 – September 14, 1940) was an American Major League Baseball first baseman. Nicknamed "Dasher", he played for the Philadelphia Athletics of the American Association in 1890, the team's last year of existence.

He died on September 14, 1940, and was interred at Lawnview Memorial Park in Rockledge, Pennsylvania.
