= Bill Collins (catcher) =

Irish baseball player (1863–1893)

- Catcher
- Born: 1863; Dublin, Ireland
- Died: June 8, 1893 (aged 29–30); Brooklyn, New York, U.S.
- Batted: Right Threw: Right

MLB debut
- August 1, 1887, for the New York Metropolitans

Last MLB appearance
- September 12, 1892, for the St. Louis Browns

MLB statistics
- Batting average: .143
- Home runs: 0
- Runs batted in: 1
- Stats at Baseball Reference

Teams
- New York Metropolitans (1887); Philadelphia Athletics (1889–1890); Cleveland Spiders (1891); St. Louis Browns (1892)

William J. Collins (1863 – June 8, 1893) was an Irish professional baseball catcher. He played six seasons in pro baseball; four of those in Major League Baseball. He was born in Dublin, Ireland in 1863 (exact date unknown). Collins died on June 8, 1893, and was buried at Mount Olivet Cemetery in Maspeth, New York.

== Professional career ==
Collins began his professional career in 1887 with the major league New York Metropolitans of the American Association. He appeared in one game with the Metropolitans and got one hit in four at bats. The next season, 1888, Collins played with the minor league Lynn Shoemakers of the New England League. In 1889, Collins played for the Philadelphia Athletics of the American Association; in one game he got one hit, one RBI, and one stolen base in four at bats. He continued playing for the Athletics in 1890, and went hitless in one at bat. Later that year, Collins played for the minor league Jersey City Jerseys of the Atlantic Association and the Monmouth Maple Cities of the Illinois–Iowa League in 1890. Collins played for three teams in 1891 including the Class-A Rochester Hop Bitters and the Class-A Troy Trojans, both of the Eastern Association. He also played for the major league Cleveland Spiders that season, and in two games Collins went hitless. Collins played his last season in professional baseball in 1892 with the Class-A St. Paul Saints of the Western League and the National League St. Louis Browns. He died the following year of typhoid fever.

== See also ==
- List of Major League Baseball players from Ireland
