= Ed Pabst =

American baseball player (1868–1940)

- Outfielder
- Born: 1868; St. Louis, Missouri, U.S.
- Died: June 19, 1940 (aged 71–72); St. Louis, Missouri, U.S.
- Batted: Unknown Threw: Right

MLB debut
- September 26, 1890, for the Philadelphia Athletics

Last MLB appearance
- October 14, 1890, for the St. Louis Browns

MLB statistics
- Batting average: .308
- Home runs: 0
- Runs batted in: 3
- Stats at Baseball Reference

Teams
- Philadelphia Athletics (1890); St. Louis Browns (1890)

Edward D. A. Pabst (July 8, 1868 – June 19, 1940) was an American Major League Baseball player. He played outfield in four games for the St. Louis Brows and eight games for the Philadelphia Athletics of the American Association during the 1890 baseball season. He remained active through 1904 in the minor leagues, and even managed during part of the 1902 season.

== Sources ==
- Career statistics from Baseball Reference · Baseball Reference (Minors) · Retrosheet · Baseball Almanac
