= Jack O'Brien (catcher) =

American baseball player (1860–1910)

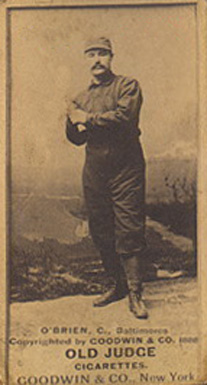
- 1888 baseball card of O'Brien
- Catcher / First baseman
- Born: June 12, 1860; Philadelphia, Pennsylvania, U.S.
- Died: November 20, 1910 (aged 50); Philadelphia, Pennsylvania, U.S.
- Batted: Right Threw: Right

MLB debut
- May 2, 1882, for the Philadelphia Athletics

Last MLB appearance
- September 16, 1890, for the Philadelphia Athletics

MLB statistics
- Batting average: .266
- Home runs: 11
- Runs batted in: 308
- Stats at Baseball Reference

Teams
- Philadelphia Athletics (1882–1886); Brooklyn Grays (1887); Baltimore Orioles (1888); Philadelphia Athletics (1890)

John K. O'Brien (born John K. Byrne, June 12, 1860 – November 20, 1910) was an American Major League Baseball player. He played primarily catcher and first base from 1882 to 1890 in the American Association.
