= Harry Stine (baseball) =

American baseball player (1864–1924)

- Pitcher
- Born: February 20, 1864; Shenandoah, Pennsylvania, U.S.
- Died: June 6, 1924 (aged 60); Niagara Falls, New York, U.S.
- Batted: Left Threw: Left

MLB debut
- July 22, 1890, for the Philadelphia Athletics

Last MLB appearance
- July 22, 1890, for the Philadelphia Athletics

MLB statistics
- Win–loss record: 0–1
- Earned run average: 9.00
- Strikeouts: 1
- Stats at Baseball Reference

Teams
- Philadelphia Athletics (1890)

Harry C. Stine (February 20, 1864 – June 6, 1924) was an American pitcher in Major League Baseball. He played for the Philadelphia Athletics of the American Association during the 1890 season.

After baseball, Stine became a businessman. He died at his home in Niagara Falls, New York on June 6, 1924.
