= Ed Carfrey =

American baseball player (1863–1921)

- Shortstop
- Born: July 1863; Philadelphia, Pennsylvania, U.S.
- Died: October 2, 1921 (aged 58); Philadelphia, Pennsylvania, U.S.
- Batted: Unknown Threw: Unknown

MLB debut
- April 19, 1890, for the Philadelphia Athletics

Last MLB appearance
- April 19, 1890, for the Philadelphia Athletics

MLB statistics
- Games played: 1
- Batting average: .250
- Runs batted in: 0
- Stats at Baseball Reference

Teams
- Philadelphia Athletics (1890)

Edwin M. Carfrey (July 1863 – October 2, 1921) was an American professional baseball player. Carfrey had a career that spanned nearly 20 years in organized baseball. He played Major League Baseball for the Philadelphia Athletics in 1890. He also played minor league baseball for several teams from 1882 to 1899. He also participated in a December 1891 exhibition of indoor, winter baseball played with a hair-filled ball measuring 19 inches in diameter and with bats reportedly resembling cut-off broomsticks.

Carfrey's minor league and semi-pro assignments include the Houston team (1882–1883, 1888), the Haymaker club (1884), the Athletic Cub of Schuylkill Navy (1891–1892), Philadelphia Colts (1894), Hazleton Quay-kers (1895), Salem (1895), Ansonia (1896), York (1896), Media (1897), and Mount Holly (1899).

== Early years ==
Carfrey was born in Philadelphia, Pennsylvania in July 1863, the same month that the Battle of Gettysburg was fought 139 miles to the west of Philadelphia. At the time of the 1870 United States Census, Carfrey was living in Philadelphia's 20th Ward with his father, Edwin Carfrey, mother Jane, older brother William, and younger brother James. His father was employed at that time as a shoe maker.

By 1880, the 17-year-old Carfrey was still living with his parents in Philadelphia. He and his older brother William were both employed at that time in a rolling mill, while their father continued to work as a shoe maker.

== Professional baseball ==
=== Philadelphia Athletics ===
In 1890, Carfrey played Major League Baseball as a shortstop for the Philadelphia Athletics of the American Association. He made his major league debut on April 19, 1890, at age 26. He appeared in only one game for the Athletics and had one hit in four at-bats for a .250 batting average.

Prior to 2005, Carfrey's record had been omitted from the records of Major League Baseball. In 2005, Carfrey's record was added to the ESPN Baseball Encyclopedia. His prior omission from official records resulted from the fact that his 1890 appearance for the Athletics "was erroneously credited to another player when the official stats were computerized."

=== Minor league baseball ===
Carfrey also played minor league baseball for several teams from 1882 to 1899.

==== Houston and Haymaker clubs ====
In 1882, Carfrey played as the catcher for the Houston baseball team from South Chester, Pennsylvania. The team played its home games at Houston Park. In the 1882 league championship game on September 30, 1882, Carfrey drove in the winning run with a hit to right field for Houston. In the spring of 1883, a newspaper account noted his contributions to the 1882 team: "Carfrey played behind the bat with scarcely an error to his credit and succeeded in putting a number of men out." He played at third base and catcher for the Houston team in 1883. In September 1883, he scored three runs and "received a terrible blow in the eye"—one of several incidents that a newspaper report characterized as "little incivilities" that "were constantly exchanged" during the game.

In 1884, he played at second and third base and at shortstop for the newly formed Haymaker baseball club from Chester, Pennsylvania.

During the 1888 season, Carfrey appeared in 28 games as a third baseman for Houston in the Philadelphia Region League.

==== Schuylkill Navy ====
In 1891 and 1892, he played for Philadelphia's Athletic Club of Schuylkill Navy (A.C.S.N.) baseball team as a third baseman. After a September 1891 game at Bristol, Pennsylvania, the crowd rushed onto the field and attacked the A.C.S.N. team. Carfrey attempted to play the role of a peace-maker amid a scene described as "a pushing, swearing, fighting mob" which would have injured the Philadelphia men had the Bristol players and police not come to their assistance. As the team left the field, "a howling crowd of young boys" threw stones, "smooth and jagged," at the Navy's bus.

In December 1891, he played in an exhibition of indoor baseball at the Philadelphia Industrial Hall. The game was played with a hair-filled ball measuring 19 inches in diameter and with bats reportedly resembling cut-off broomsticks. Carfrey played third base for A.C.S.N. team in the indoor exhibition. The Sporting Life reported on the game as follows: "The game was to the players themselves, perhaps, very amusing, but it would take a crank of the deepest dye to see anything laudable in the game. In simple words, it is a travesty on the noblest of games and cannot be considered in any other light than a catch-penny affair."

==== 1895 to 1899 seasons ====
In 1894, Carfrey appeared in 14 games for the Philadelphia Colts of the Pennsylvania State League. He compiled a .200 batting average in 55 at-bats for the Colts.

In 1895, Carfrey played for two minor league teams. He appeared in 49 games for the Hazleton Quay-kers in the Pennsylvania State League, compiling a .263 batting average in 209 at-bats. An account in The Sporting Life from May 1895 noted that Carfrey began the season at second base but was transferred to first base "and is doing well at that position." He also played for Salem in the South New Jersey League in 1895.

In 1896, Carfrey played with the Ansonia Blues from Ansonia, Connecticut in the Naugatuck Valley League. Newspaper accounts in the Sporting Life indicate that he also played second base for a "York" baseball team (presumably York, Pennsylvania) in 1896.

In November 1897, The Sporting Life reported that Carfrey was the captain of the Media Base Ball Club in Media, Pennsylvania, located 12 miles west of Philadelphia.

In 1899, Carfrey, at age 35, played at second base for the Mount Holly (a suburb of Philadelphia in New Jersey) team in the Burlington County League.

== Later years ==
In 1884, Carfrey was married to Emma Chapman. They had one child, Edwin Carfrey, born in February 1885 and died in May of that same year. In the 1892 Philadelphia City Directory, Carfrey was listed as a "rougher" residing at 306 York. He was also listed as a "rougher" in the 1899 Philadelphia directory. At the time of the 1900 United States census, Carfrey was living in Philadelphia's 19th Ward with his wife, Emma, at the home of his in-laws, Howard and Mary Chapman. He was employed at the time in the iron business. Carfrey was employed as an ironmaker in 1908, an ironworker in 1912, a "roller" in 1913, and a "molder" in 1917.

Carfrey died in Philadelphia in 1921 at age 58. He was buried at the New Cathedral Cemetery in Philadelphia.
