= Bill Blair (1880s pitcher) =

American baseball player (1863–1890)

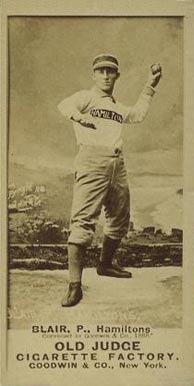
- Pitcher
- Born: September 17, 1863; Pittsburgh, Pennsylvania, U.S.
- Died: February 22, 1890 (aged 26); Pittsburgh, Pennsylvania, U.S.
- Batted: Left Threw: Left

MLB debut
- July 19, 1888, for the Philadelphia Athletics

Last MLB appearance
- September 23, 1888, for the Philadelphia Athletics

MLB statistics
- Win–loss record: 1–3
- Strikeouts: 16
- Earned run average: 2.61
- Stats at Baseball Reference

Teams
- Philadelphia Athletics (1888)

William Ellsworth Blair (September 17, 1863 – February 22, 1890) was an American professional baseball player. He played in the major-league American Association in 1888 for the Philadelphia Athletics. A left-handed pitcher who batted from the left side, Blair had a listed playing weight of 172 pounds (78 kg).

== Career ==
During an eight-year career as a professional, Blair spent one season in the major leagues. He started four games for the Philadelphia Athletics of the American Association in 1888, winning one and losing three. His 2.61 ERA was better than the league average, and he was also a positive contributor with the bat, posting a .308 batting average, .357 on-base percentage, and .385 slugging percentage in fourteen plate appearances.

== Illness and death ==
Blair had signed a contract to spend the 1890 season with the Chicago Cubs, but he died as a result of illness before games began, during the first outbreak of the 1889–1890 pandemic. His obituary listed the cause of death as "influenza, which turned into pneumonia and typhoid fever".

== See also ==
- List of baseball players who died during their careers
