= José Junco =

Cuban baseball player

- Pitcher
- Born: June 3, 1890; Matanzas, Cuba
- Bats: Unknown Throws: Left

José Irene Junco Casanova (born June 3, 1890 – death date unknown) was a Cuban professional baseball pitcher in the Cuban League and the Negro leagues. He played from 1909 to 1922 with several clubs, including Club Fé, Habana, Cuban Stars (West), and the Cuban Stars (East).
