= Bob Caruthers =

American baseball player (1864–1911)

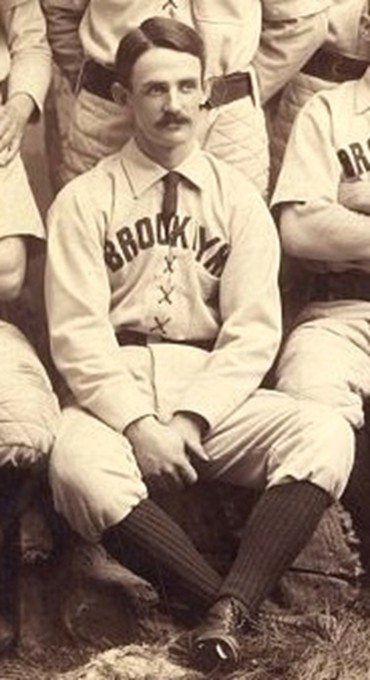
- Caruthers c. 1888–1891
- Pitcher / Outfielder
- Born: January 5, 1864; Memphis, Tennessee, U.S.
- Died: August 5, 1911 (aged 47); Peoria, Illinois, U.S.
- Batted: Left Threw: Right

MLB debut
- September 7, 1884, for the St. Louis Browns

Last MLB appearance
- May 19, 1893, for the Cincinnati Reds

MLB statistics
- Win–loss record: 218–99
- Earned run average: 2.83
- Strikeouts: 900
- Batting average: .282
- Home runs: 29
- Runs batted in: 359
- Stats at Baseball Reference

Teams
- As player: St. Louis Browns (1884–1887); Brooklyn Bridegrooms / Grooms (1888–1891); St. Louis Browns (1892); Chicago Colts (1893); Cincinnati Reds (1893); As manager: St. Louis Browns (1892)

Career highlights and awards
- 2× AA wins champion (1885, 1889); AA ERA champion (1885)

Robert Lee Caruthers (January 5, 1864 – August 5, 1911), nicknamed "Parisian Bob", was an American right-handed pitcher and right fielder in Major League Baseball who played primarily for the St. Louis Browns and Brooklyn Bridegrooms. The star pitcher on five league champions in a ten-year career, he was the top pitcher in the American Association, leading that league in wins and shutouts twice each, winning percentage three times, and earned run average once. His 175 wins in the Association were the second most of any pitcher, and his league ERA of 2.62 was the lowest of any pitcher with at least 2,000 innings in the league; he was also the only pitcher to have 40-win seasons for two different Association teams. His career winning percentage was the highest of any pitcher prior to 1950 with at least 250 decisions.

== St. Louis ==
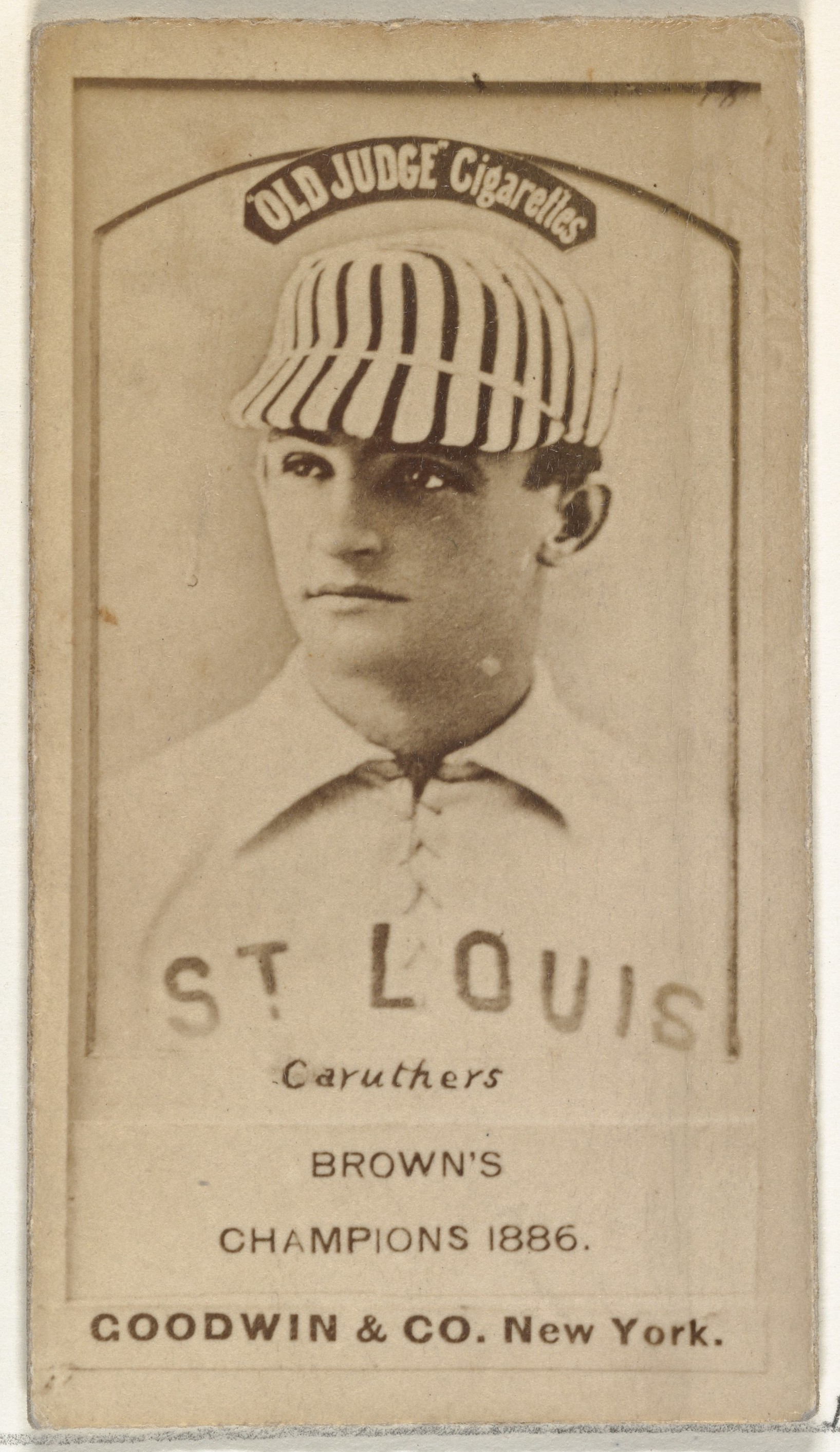
Robert Lee "Parisian Bob" Caruthers, St. Louis Browns, 1886

Born in Memphis, Tennessee, Caruthers debuted with a four-hitter for the Browns in late 1884. Caruthers, who stood 5'7" and weighed 138 pounds, led the team to its first pennant the following year. He led the league in wins (40), ERA (2.07), shutouts (6) and winning percentage (.755) in 1885, and was 30–14 for the 1886 champions after a lengthy contract dispute which he conducted from Paris, earning him his nickname. In 1886, he also played right field when not pitching, batting .334 to place him among the league's top five hitters, and leading the league in on-base percentage. On August 16 of that year, he became the fourth pitcher to hit two home runs in a game, while also getting a double and a triple; after the last he was thrown out at the plate, ending the game, in trying for a third home run. In 1887, despite battling malaria, he again led the league in winning percentage with a 29–9 record as the Browns won their third consecutive title; he also batted .357 with 73 runs batted in, while finishing second in the league in slugging percentage for the second consecutive year.

After the team's 1887 postseason loss, during which the team was criticized for its recreational activities, his contract was sold to Brooklyn by team owner Chris von der Ahe, who largely blamed Caruthers, an expert billiards and poker player, for the failure.

== Brooklyn ==
Caruthers posted a record of 29–15 in 1888, though his batting average dropped to .230; in 1889 he again led the league in wins (40), shutouts (7) and winning percentage (.784) as the team captured its first title, but rarely played in the field when not pitching. 1888 marked the fourth year that Caruthers hit more home runs than he allowed while pitching. Brooklyn changed leagues following the 1889 season, joining the National League. Caruthers' 175 wins during six Association seasons would stand as the second-best total in the league's ten-year existence, behind Tony Mullane's 203 wins in seven seasons; Caruthers' league ERA of 2.62 was the best of any pitcher with at least 2,000 innings, and put him behind only Ed Morris and Will White among those with 1,500 innings.

In 1890, Caruthers posted a record of 23–11 as Brooklyn won the NL title in their first season in the league; he also saw considerable playing time in left field and batted .265. In 1891 his record slipped to 18–14, and he played only occasionally in right field though he hit .281.

== Later career ==
In 1892 Caruthers returned to the Browns, who had joined the NL that season in a league merger; it marked his last season as a pitcher as he earned only two victories, though he played regularly in right field, hitting .277 with 69 RBI. He also managed the team for the final third of the season, compiling a 16–32 record. In 1893 the pitching distance was increased from 50 feet to 60 feet 6 inches, and after playing one game in center field with the Chicago Colts, he ended his Major League career with several games in right field for the Cincinnati Reds. He continued to play in the minor leagues until 1898, and later became an American League umpire in 1902 and 1903.

== Legacy ==
During his career Caruthers threw 298 career complete games among his 310 starts, including 24 shutouts, and had a career ERA of 2.83 in 2,828 2/3 innings pitched. He also batted .282 lifetime with 29 home runs and 359 RBI. He was the only 19th-century pitcher to lead the league in winning percentage three times. Many sources recognize him as having compiled 218 wins and 99 losses, making his .688 winning percentage third all-time behind only Whitey Ford, and Dave Foutz (his teammate for eight seasons) among pitchers with at least 200 major league decisions. However, that is based on a total of 10 losses in the 1892 season (his last as a pitcher), a total revised from the contemporary record; the official league records for that year, which are recognized by Major League Baseball, charged him with only 8 losses, a figure which some other sources also recognize. The reduction of two losses would increase his career winning percentage to .691, placing him behind only Spud Chandler who compiled a record of .717 over 150 decisions.

On August 5, 1911, Caruthers died after a month-long illness in Peoria, Illinois, where he had lived for three years. He was 47 years old. Caruthers was under a minor league baseball umpiring contract with the Illinois–Indiana–Iowa League at the time of his death.

== See also ==
- List of St. Louis Cardinals team records
- List of Major League Baseball career wins leaders
- List of Major League Baseball career ERA leaders
- List of Major League Baseball annual wins leaders
- List of Major League Baseball annual ERA leaders
- List of Major League Baseball player-managers

Preceded by Henry Porter; Mickey Hughes	Brooklyn Bridegrooms; Opening Day; Starting pitcher 1888; 1890	Succeeded by Mickey Hughes; George Hemming
