= Charles Snyder (baseball) =

American baseball player (1873–1901)

- Outfielder / Catcher
- Born: January 1873; Camden, New Jersey, U.S.
- Died: March 3, 1901 (aged 28); Philadelphia, Pennsylvania, U.S.
- Batted: Right Threw: Right

MLB debut
- September 19, 1890, for the Philadelphia Athletics

Last MLB appearance
- October 8, 1890, for the Philadelphia Athletics

MLB statistics
- Batting average: .273
- Home runs: 0
- Runs batted in: 4
- Stats at Baseball Reference

Teams
- Philadelphia Athletics (1890)

Charles F. Snyder (January 1873 – March 3, 1901) was an American Major League Baseball outfielder and catcher. He played for the Philadelphia Athletics of the American Association in 1890, their last year of existence.
