= John Riddle (baseball) =

American baseball player (1864–1931)

- Catcher/Outfielder
- Born: February 1864; Philadelphia, Pennsylvania, U.S.
- Died: May 5, 1931 (aged 67); Camden, New Jersey, U.S.
- Batted: Right Threw: Right

MLB debut
- September 18, 1889, for the Washington Nationals

Last MLB appearance
- October 11, 1890, for the Philadelphia Athletics

MLB statistics
- Batting average: .123
- Home runs: 0
- Runs batted in: 5
- Stats at Baseball Reference

Teams
- Washington Nationals (1889); Philadelphia Athletics (1890)

John H. Riddle (1864–1931) was an American Minor League Baseball player. He played in 11 games for the 1889 Washington Nationals of the National League and 27 games for the 1890 Philadelphia Athletics of the American Association.

John served on the Jury for a murder trial in March of 1891 of Annie C. Leconey.

- [The Philadelphia Times Newspaper | Number 5682 | Page 1 Cover (Thursday, March 5th, 1891)
