= Henry Porter (baseball) =

American baseball player (1858–1906)

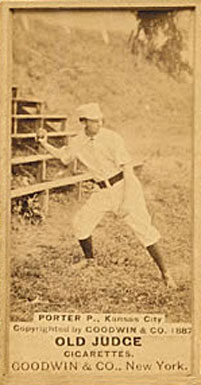
- Pitcher
- Born: June 1858; Vergennes, Vermont, U.S.
- Died: December 30, 1906 (aged 48); Brockton, Massachusetts, U.S.
- Batted: Right Threw: Right

MLB debut
- September 27, 1884, for the Milwaukee Brewers

Last MLB appearance
- May 25, 1889, for the Kansas City Cowboys

MLB statistics
- Win–loss record: 96–107
- Earned run average: 3.70
- Strikeouts: 659
- Stats at Baseball Reference

Teams
- Milwaukee Brewers (1884); Brooklyn Grays (1885–1887); Kansas City Cowboys (1888–1889)

Career highlights and awards
- Pitched a no-hitter on June 6, 1888

Walter Henry Porter (June 1858 – December 30, 1906) was an American Major League Baseball player born in Vergennes, Vermont who pitched for three teams during his six-year career.

== Career ==
Porter began his career in the short-lived Union Association for the replacement team Milwaukee Brewers. It was for this team that he struck out 18 batters in one game on October 3, 1884. The 18 strikeouts in one game by a losing pitcher stood as the record until Steve Carlton surpassed it when he struck out 19 in one game in 1969. When the Association folded following the season, he was picked up by the Brooklyn Grays, with whom he was their star pitcher. In 1885, he had a record of 33 wins and 21 losses, followed up the next year with 27 wins and 19 losses.

After having a 15–24 record in 1887, Porter was purchased by the Kansas City Cowboys for 1888. He had a record of 18–37, leading the league in hits allowed, runs allowed, home runs allowed, and losses, but on June 6, he pitched a no-hitter against the Baltimore Orioles.

== Post-career ==
Porter died in Brockton, Massachusetts at the age of 48, and is interred at Calvary Cemetery, also in Brockton.

== See also ==
- List of Major League Baseball no-hitters

Achievements
Preceded by John Harkins	Brooklyn Grays; Opening Day; Starting pitcher 1887	Succeeded by Bob Caruthers
Preceded by Adonis Terry	No-hitter pitcher June 6, 1888	Succeeded by Ed Seward
