= Sadie McMahon =

American baseball player (1867–1954)

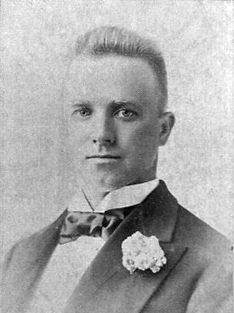
- Pitcher
- Born: September 19, 1867; Wilmington, Delaware, U.S.
- Died: February 20, 1954 (aged 86); New Castle, Delaware, U.S.
- Batted: Right Threw: Right

MLB debut
- July 5, 1889, for the Philadelphia Athletics

Last MLB appearance
- July 12, 1897, for the Brooklyn Bridegrooms

MLB statistics
- Win–loss record: 173–127
- Earned run average: 3.51
- Strikeouts: 967
- Stats at Baseball Reference

Teams
- Philadelphia Athletics (1889–1890); Baltimore Orioles (1890–1896); Brooklyn Bridegrooms (1897)

John Joseph "Sadie" McMahon (September 19, 1867 – February 20, 1954) was an American professional baseball player who played pitcher in the Major Leagues from 1889 to 1897. McMahon played for the Philadelphia Athletics, Baltimore Orioles, and the Brooklyn Bridegrooms.

McMahon was born in Wilmington, Delaware and grew up in the Henry Clay Village area. In 1954, McMahon died and was buried in St. Joseph on the Brandywine Church Cemetery in Wilmington. He was inducted into the Delaware Sports Museum and Hall of Fame in 1979.

== See also ==
- List of Major League Baseball annual strikeout leaders

== Sources ==
- Career statistics from Baseball Reference · Baseball Reference (Minors) · Retrosheet · Baseball Almanac
