= Tom Lovett =

American baseball player (1863–1928)

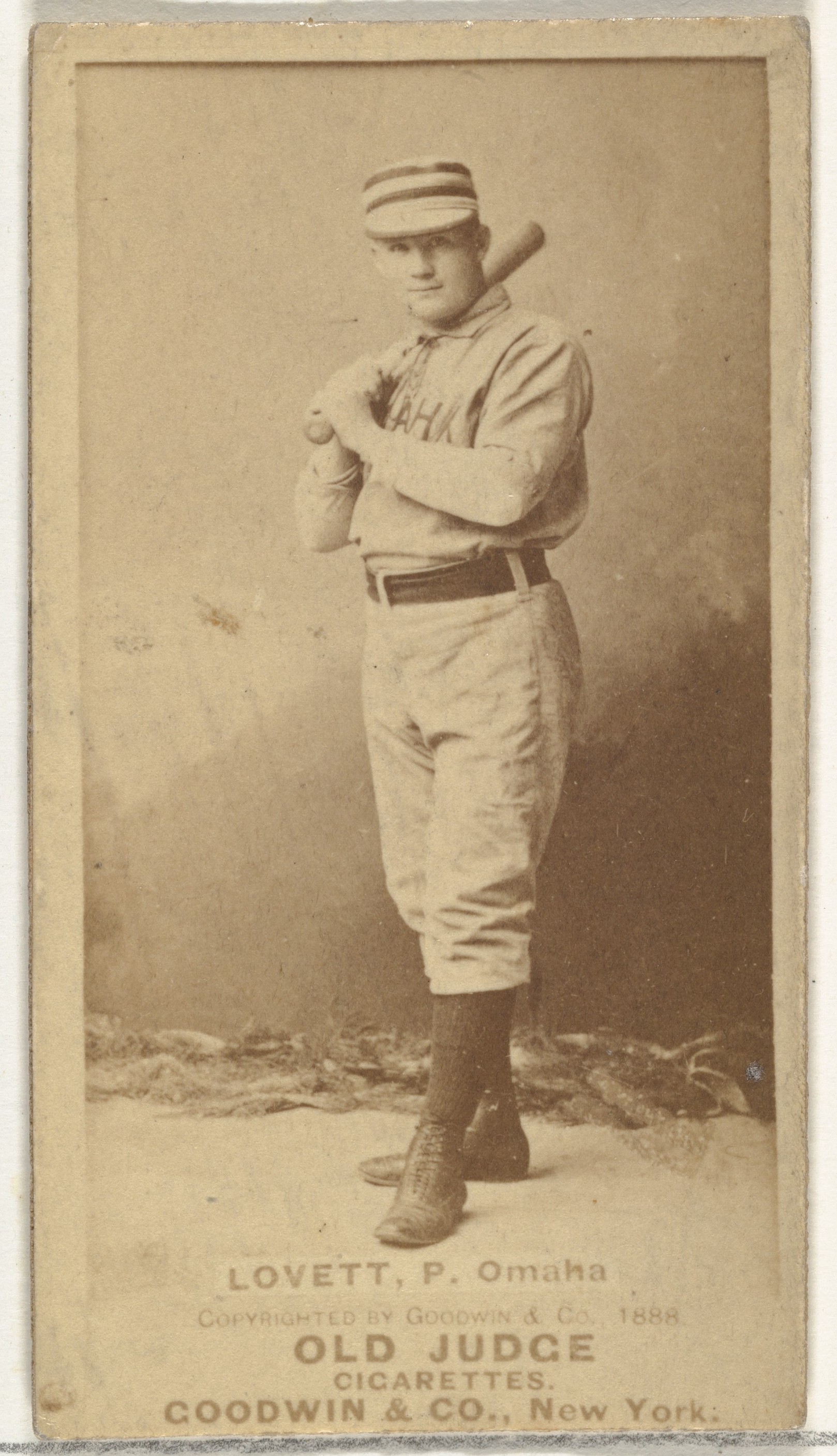
- Pitcher
- Born: December 7, 1863; Providence, Rhode Island, U.S.
- Died: March 19, 1928 (aged 64); Providence, Rhode Island, U.S.
- Batted: Right Threw: Right

MLB debut
- June 4, 1885, for the Philadelphia Athletics

Last MLB appearance
- July 9, 1894, for the Boston Beaneaters

MLB statistics
- Win–loss record: 88–59
- Earned run average: 3.94
- Strikeouts: 439
- Stats at Baseball Reference

Teams
- Philadelphia Athletics (1885); Brooklyn Bridegrooms/Grooms (1889–1891, 1893); Boston Beaneaters (1894)

Career highlights and awards
- Pitched a no-hitter on June 22, 1891

Thomas Joseph Lovett (December 7, 1863 – March 19, 1928) was an American professional baseball pitcher. He played all or part of six seasons in Major League Baseball between 1885 and 1894.

After playing for the Waterbury team in the Connecticut State League in 1884, Lovett made his major league debut on June 4, 1885 for the Philadelphia Athletics. After pitching only 16 games, he did not pitch in the majors again until being signed by the Brooklyn Bridegrooms in 1889, when he helped the team to the American Association pennant. Brooklyn jumped to the National League in 1890, and that year, Lovett was arguably the best player on the club. He went 30-11 with a 2.78 ERA. In the World Series, he pitched four complete games and won two of them, as Brooklyn played the Louisville Colonels to a draw.

On June 22, 1891, Lovett pitched a no-hitter against the New York Giants, a 4-0 victory.

Lovett then demanded more pay, and threatened to quit baseball. He sat out the 1892 season, and when he returned, he was largely ineffective. He played in the minor leagues until 1896, after which he retired.

Lovett died at the age of 64 in his hometown of Providence, Rhode Island and is interred at St. Ann Cemetery in Cranston, Rhode Island.

== See also ==
- List of Major League Baseball no-hitters

Achievements
Preceded by Ledell Titcomb	No-hitter pitcher June 22, 1891	Succeeded by Amos Rusie
