= Ed Seward =

American baseball player (1867–1947)

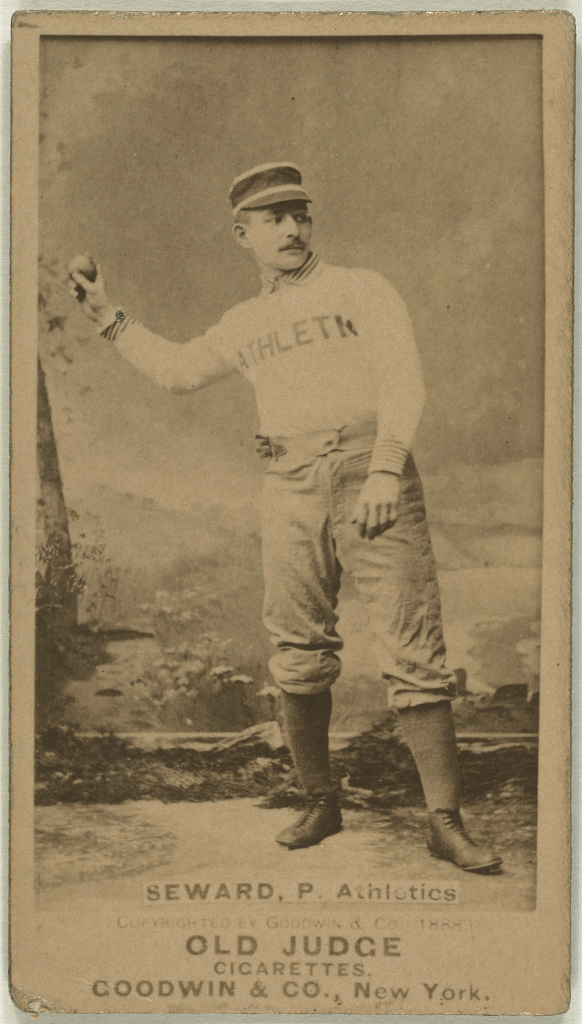
- 1888 baseball card of Seward
- Pitcher
- Born: June 29, 1867; Cleveland, Ohio, U.S.
- Died: July 30, 1947 (aged 80); Cleveland, Ohio, U.S.
- Batted: Unknown Threw: Right

MLB debut
- September 30, 1885, for the Providence Grays

Last MLB appearance
- June 8, 1891, for the Cleveland Spiders

MLB statistics
- Win–loss record: 89–72
- Earned run average: 3.40
- Strikeouts: 589
- Stats at Baseball Reference

Teams
- Providence Grays (1885); Philadelphia Athletics (1887–1890); Cleveland Spiders (1891)

Career highlights and awards
- Led the American Association in strikeouts and shutouts in 1888; Pitched a no-hitter on July 26, 1888

Edward William Seward (June 29, 1867 – July 30, 1947), born Edward William Sourhardt, was an American professional baseball pitcher from 1884 to 1892. He played six seasons in Major League Baseball.

== Career ==
Seward was born in Cleveland, Ohio, in 1867. He started his professional baseball career in 1884 with Terre Haute of the Northwestern League. That season, he had a win–loss record of 1–7.

Seward made his major league debut in September 1885 with the National League's Providence Grays. He pitched one game for them that season and did not get a decision. Otherwise, Seward spent most of 1885 and 1886 in the minor leagues. In 1886, he went 10–14 for the International League's Binghamton Crickets.

Seward joined the American Association's Philadelphia Athletics in 1887. He went 25–25 with a 4.13 earned run average and 155 strikeouts. In 1888, Seward went 35–19 with a 2.01 ERA, and he led the AA with 272 strikeouts and 6 shutouts. On July 26, he threw a no-hitter against the Cincinnati Red Stockings.

In 1889, Seward went 21–15 with a 3.97 ERA and 102 strikeouts. In 1890, he went 6–12 with a 4.73 ERA and 55 strikeouts.

Seward joined the NL's Cleveland Spiders in 1891. He went 2–1 before the Spiders released him in June.

After his playing career ended, Seward was an NL umpire in 1893. He died in Cleveland in 1947.

== See also ==
- List of Major League Baseball annual strikeout leaders
- List of Major League Baseball annual shutout leaders
- List of Major League Baseball no-hitters

Achievements
| Preceded by Henry Porter | No-hitter pitcher July 26, 1888 | Succeeded by Gus Weyhing |
