= Bill Sharsig =

American baseball executive and manager

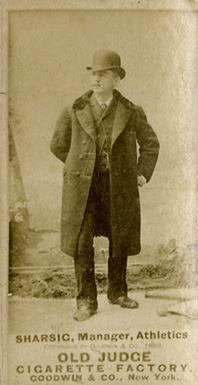
- Manager
- Born: 1855; Philadelphia, Pennsylvania, U.S.
- Died: February 1, 1902; Philadelphia, Pennsylvania, U.S.
- Batted: Unknown Threw: Unknown

MLB debut
- August 26, 1886, for the Philadelphia Athletics

Last MLB appearance
- May 13, 1891, for the Philadelphia Athletics (1891)

MLB statistics
- Games: 474
- Win–loss record: 244 – 218
- Winning %: .528

Teams
- Philadelphia Athletics (1886, 1888–1890); Philadelphia Athletics (1891)

William A. Sharsig (1855 – February 1, 1902) was an American Major League Baseball co-owner, general manager, business manager and on field manager of the American Association Philadelphia Athletics, both their first incarnation and their second, which had migrated over from the Players' League. He lived, worked, and was born in Philadelphia.

== Managerial career ==
Sharsig founded the Athletics in September 1880. In 1881, the team went on a barnstorming tour, and Sharsig took on two partners: player Charlie Mason and manager Horace Phillips. After the tour, Phillips jumped ship to the Philadelphia Quakers, a competing team founded by Al Reach, which eventually became the Philadelphia Phillies, and was replaced on the management team by minstrel show performer Lew Simmons.

As co-owner of the team, Bill named himself manager of his team on several occasions. In five seasons; 1886, and from 1888 to 1891. He finished his career with 238 wins and 216 losses for a .524 winning percentage.

== Post-career ==
After the Association folded in 1891, Bill went on to manage the Indianapolis team in the Western League in 1892 and in 1894. Bill died in his hometown of Philadelphia, and was interred at Mount Vernon Cemetery.

Preceded by Lew Simmons; Charlie Mason	Philadelphia Athletics (AA) Managers; 1886; 1888 – 1890	Succeeded by Frank Bancroft; Team folded
Preceded by Charlie Buffinton	Philadelphia Quakers/Athletics (PL/AA) Managers; 1891	Succeeded by George Wood
