= 1890 in baseball =

The following are the baseball events of the year 1890 throughout the world.

== Champions ==
- National League: Brooklyn Bridegrooms
- American Association: Louisville Colonels
- Players' League: Boston Reds
- World Series: Brooklyn Bridegrooms 3, Louisville Colonels 3, 1 tie
- Inter-league playoff: Brooklyn (NL) declined challenge by Boston (PL)
- Inter-league playoff: Louisville (AA) declined challenge by Boston (PL)

== Statistical leaders ==
Any team shown in small text indicates a previous team a player was on during the season.

	American Association		National League		Players' League	
Stat	Player	Total	Player	Total	Player	Total
AVG	Jimmy Wolf (LOU)	.363	Jack Glasscock (NYG)	.336	Pete Browning (CLI)	.373
HR	Count Campau (STL)	9	Thomas Burns (BRO); Mike Tiernan (NYG); Walt Wilmot (CHI)	13	Hardy Richardson (BSR)	16
RBI	Spud Johnson (COL)	113	Thomas Burns (BRO)	128	Hardy Richardson (BSR)	152
W	Sadie McMahon (BAL/PHA)	36	Bill Hutchison (CHI)	41	Mark Baldwin (CPI)	33
ERA	Scott Stratton (LOU)	2.36	Billy Rhines (CIN)	1.95	Silver King (CPI)	2.69
K	Sadie McMahon (BAL/PHA)	291	Amos Rusie (NYG)	341	Mark Baldwin (CPI)	206

== Major league baseball final standings ==
=== American Association final standings ===
American Association
Team	W	L	Pct.	GB	Home	Road
Louisville Colonels	88	44	.667	—	57‍–‍13	31‍–‍31
Columbus Solons	79	55	.590	10	47‍–‍22	32‍–‍33
St. Louis Browns	78	58	.574	12	45‍–‍25	33‍–‍33
Toledo Maumees	68	64	.515	20	40‍–‍27	28‍–‍37
Rochester Broncos	63	63	.500	22	40‍–‍22	23‍–‍41
Baltimore Orioles	15	19	.441	24	8‍–‍11	7‍–‍8
Syracuse Stars	55	72	.433	30½	30‍–‍30	25‍–‍42
Philadelphia Athletics	54	78	.409	34	36‍–‍36	18‍–‍42
Brooklyn Gladiators	26	73	.263	45½	15‍–‍22	11‍–‍51

Locations of teams for the 1890 American Association season
American Association

=== National League final standings ===
National League
Team	W	L	Pct.	GB	Home	Road
Brooklyn Bridegrooms	86	43	.667	—	58‍–‍16	28‍–‍27
Chicago Colts	83	53	.610	6½	48‍–‍24	35‍–‍29
Philadelphia Phillies	78	53	.595	9	54‍–‍21	24‍–‍32
Cincinnati Reds	77	55	.583	10½	50‍–‍23	27‍–‍32
Boston Beaneaters	76	57	.571	12	43‍–‍23	33‍–‍34
New York Giants	63	68	.481	24	37‍–‍27	26‍–‍41
Cleveland Spiders	44	88	.333	43½	30‍–‍37	14‍–‍51
Pittsburgh Alleghenys	23	113	.169	66½	14‍–‍25	9‍–‍88

Locations of teams for the 1890 National League season
National League

=== Players' League final standings ===
Players' League
Team	W	L	Pct.	GB	Home	Road
Boston Reds	81	48	.628	—	48‍–‍21	33‍–‍27
Brooklyn Ward's Wonders	76	56	.576	6½	46‍–‍19	30‍–‍37
New York Giants	74	57	.565	8	47‍–‍19	27‍–‍38
Chicago Pirates	75	62	.547	10	46‍–‍23	29‍–‍39
Philadelphia Athletics	68	63	.519	14	35‍–‍30	33‍–‍33
Pittsburgh Burghers	60	68	.469	20½	37‍–‍28	23‍–‍40
Cleveland Infants	55	75	.423	26½	31‍–‍30	24‍–‍45
Buffalo Bisons	36	96	.273	46½	23‍–‍42	13‍–‍54

Locations of teams for the 1890 Players' League season
Players' League

== Notable seasons ==
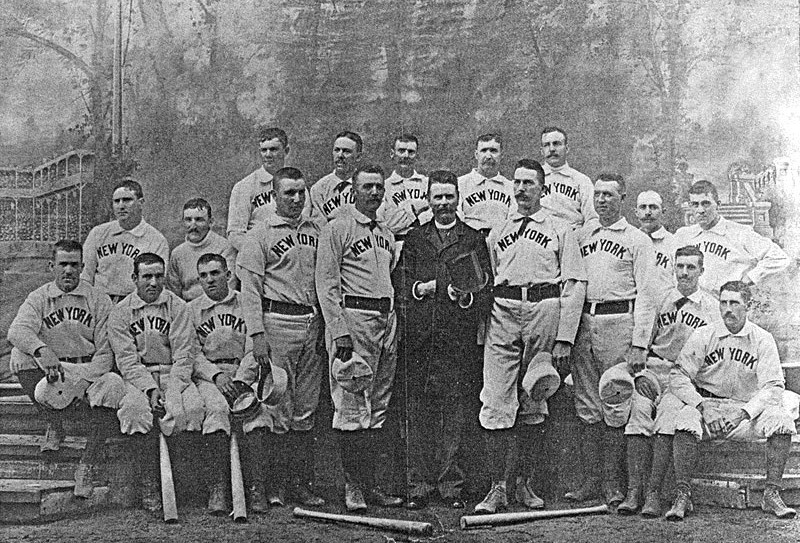
1890 New York Giants

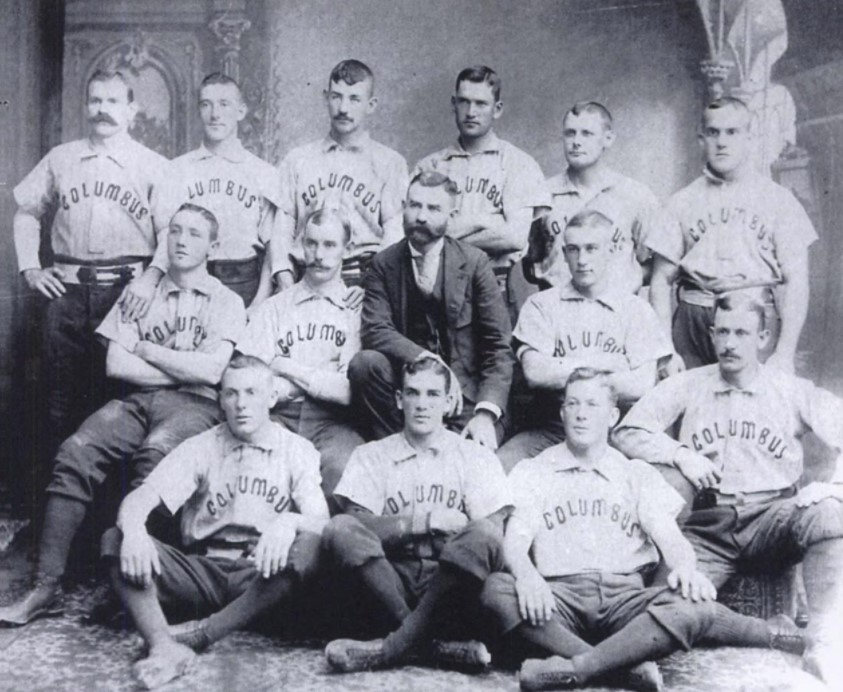
1890 Columbus Solons

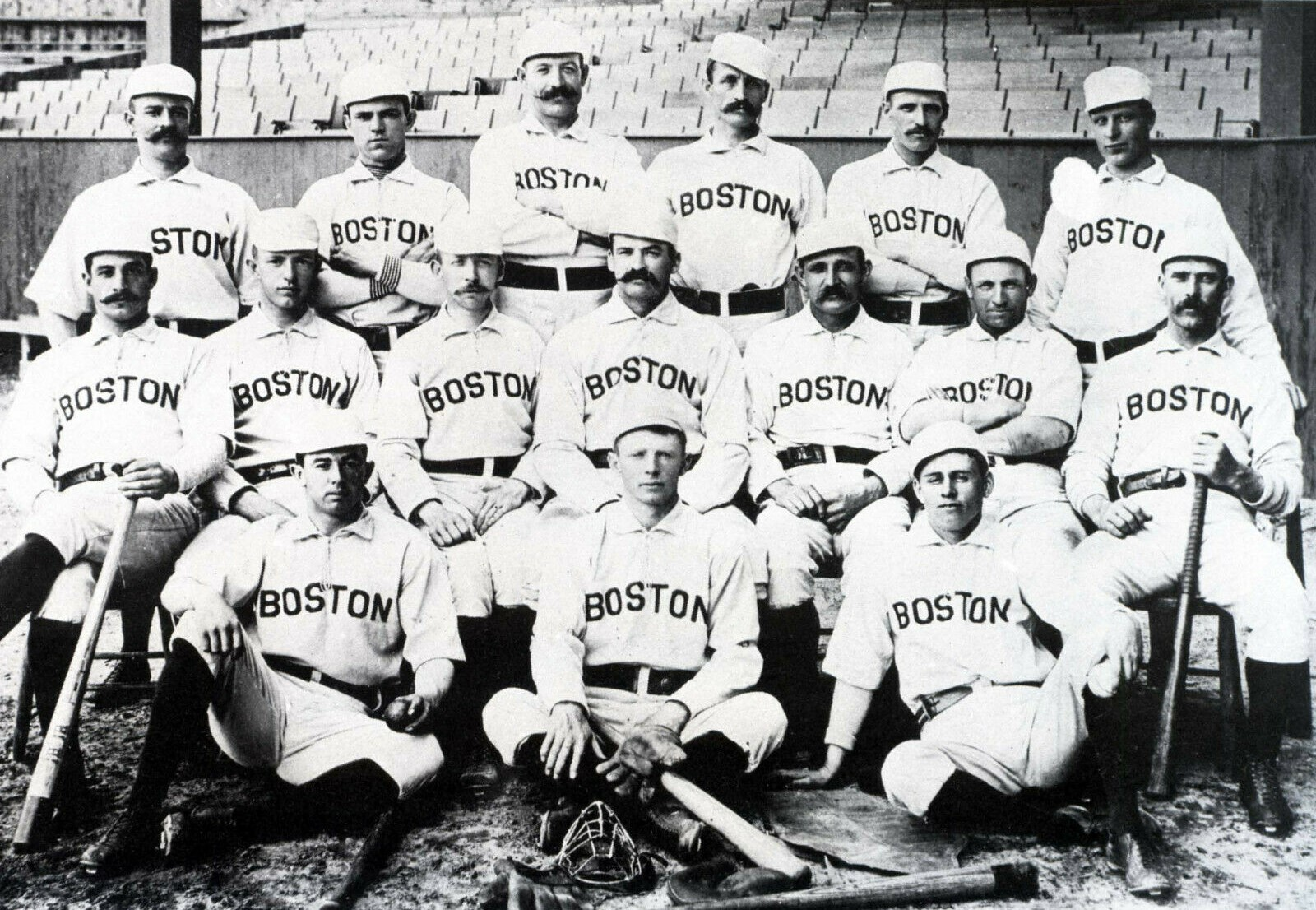
1890 Boston Reds

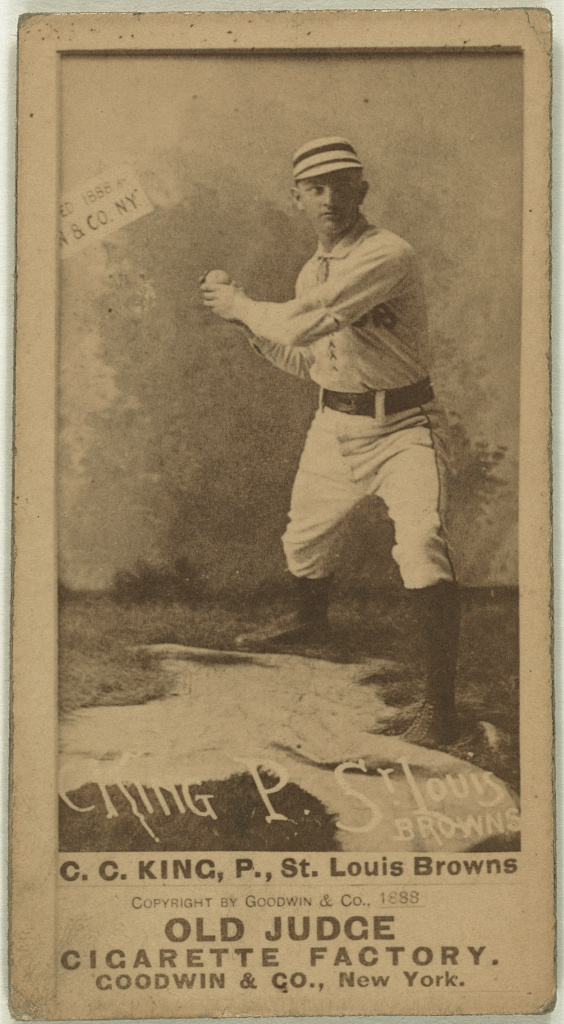
Silver King

- Cleveland Infants left fielder Pete Browning led the PL in batting average (.373) and adjusted OPS+ (169). He was second in the PL in on-base percentage (.459). He was fifth in the PL in slugging percentage (.517) and hits (184).
- Chicago Pirates pitcher Silver King had a win–loss record of 30–22 and led the PL in earned run average (2.69), adjusted ERA+ (162), and shutouts (4). He was second in the PL in innings pitched (461), wins (30), and strikeouts (185).

== Events ==
=== January–March ===
- January 9 – The Brooklyn Gladiators are admitted to the American Association, joining Toledo, Rochester and Syracuse as new members.
- January 28 – New York Supreme Court Justice Morgan J. O'Brien rules in favor of John Montgomery Ward's Reserve Clause case, and by extension the Players' League, by ruling baseball contracts lacked mutuality and were therefore unenforceable. This is the first in several rulings that allows the Players' League to proceed as planned.
- February 1 – The National League finalizes its schedule for 1890, but refuses to release it. Speculation abounds that they are waiting for the Players' League to release their own schedule so that the new circuit may purposely schedule conflicting games in the same cities where both leagues have teams.
- February 20 – Sam Rice is born in Morocco, Indiana. A quick outfielder with a great arm, Rice will lead the American League in hits twice, in stolen bases once, and collect at least 200 hits on six occasions, while finishing in the top ten in batting average eight times. Rice will gain election to the Hall of Fame in 1963.
- February 24 – An anonymous group allegedly offers $1 million to purchase the entire National League. The National League, believing the offer a hoax, turns it down. Some believe the offer was made by the Players' League, knowing the new circuit would refuse the offer, so they could point to the refusal as proof that the National League was in much better financial shape than they claimed.
- March 6 – The National League releases its official schedule although many believe it to be an intentional fake as it includes the Indianapolis Hoosiers and the Washington Nationals, who are rumored to be on the brink of being bought out by the league.
- March 11 – The Players' League releases its schedule while claiming it paid no attention to the previously released National League schedule.
- March 27 – The Inter-State League rejects an application from an all-black team made up of former Cuban Giants.

=== April–June ===
- April 15 – A judge in Philadelphia, citing the John Montgomery Ward decision, refuses to grant an injunction against Bill Hallman that would keep him from playing in the Players' League.
- April 17 – The Players' League is officially launched even though the structure has been in place for several months. Due to player contract wording, the PL's legal representation thought it best to wait until 1890 to officially form. The Players' League had also decided to wait until several lawsuits and injunctions were decided.
- April 17 – The American Association season begins. Despite being only marginally involved in the war between the Players' League and the National League, the AA will receive as many battle wounds as the 2 openly fighting leagues do.
- April 19 – Amid much hoopla, the National League and the Players' League both open their seasons with directly conflicting games. Both leagues will inflate attendance figures all season in an effort to influence public opinion.
- April 19 – George Davis makes his major league debut with the Cleveland Spiders.
- April 19 – Henry Gruber of the Cleveland Infants walks 16 batters in one game.
- April 22 – The Philadelphia Athletics of the American Association steal 19 bases against rookie catcher Grant Briggs of the Syracuse Stars in a 17–6 victory.
- April 22 – Jesse Burkett makes his major league debut with the New York Giants.
- April 23 – Kid Nichols makes his major league debut with the Boston Beaneaters.
- April 26 – Charlie Ganzel of the Boston Beaneaters tags 2 runners out at the plate in completing a triple play against the New York Giants.
- May 1 – George Pinkney of the Brooklyn Bridegrooms has his consecutive games streak stopped at 577 after being spiked in a game. Pinkney's game streak would stand until 1920 when it was broken by Everett Scott, but Pinkney's consecutive innings streak would last until it was broken by Cal Ripken Jr. nearly 100 years later.
- May 8 – Wee Willie McGill starts today for the Cleveland Infants against the Buffalo Bisons in a Players' League game. McGill, who is only 16 years and 6 months, yields 7 hits, walks 7, strikes out 10, and singles in a 14–5 complete game victory.
- May 3 – Jack Stivetts of the St. Louis Browns strikes out 7 consecutive batters for the 2nd time in a week.
- May 12 – Mike Tiernan of the New York Giants hits a mammoth 13th-inning solo home run off of Boston Beaneaters pitcher Kid Nichols to give Amos Rusie a 1–0 win. Tiernan's shot lands in the outfield of the adjacent Polo Grounds while a Players' League game is being played. Crowds from both games cheer Tiernan as he circles the bases.
- May 22 – Harry Wright, manager of the Philadelphia Phillies, is inexplicably struck blind. It will take 10 days before Wright can even distinguish light from dark, and he will not return to managing until August 6.
- May 31 – George Gore, Buck Ewing, and Roger Connor of the Players' League New York Giants become the first trio to hit back-to-back-to-back home runs in a win over the Pittsburgh Burghers.
- June 4 – Tim Keefe of the New York Giants of the Players' League wins his 300th career game with a 9–4 victory over the Boston Reds.
- June 7 – Jack McFetridge of the Philadelphia Phillies pitches a 5-hitter in his major league debut, winning 4–1. McFetridge will not appear again in the majors until 1903, when he goes 1–11 for the Phillies.
- June 15 – Bill Greenwood of the Rochester Broncos becomes the only left-handed shortstop to participate in a triple play as the Broncos turn it against the Syracuse Stars. It is the last game Greenwood plays at shortstop in his career.
- June 21 – Silver King of the Chicago Pirates of the Players' League pitches a no-hitter against the Brooklyn Ward's Wonders but loses 1–0 when the game's only run comes on a 2-base error. As King only pitched eight innings, Brooklyn not having to bat in the bottom of the ninth, this game is not an official major league no-hitter.
- June 23 – Mike Griffin of the Players' League Philadelphia Quakers sets a record by reaching base by way of error in all 4 at-bats in a game against the Pittsburgh Burghers.
- June 28 – Mike Tiernan of the New York Giants hits for the cycle for the 2nd time in his career.

=== July–September ===
- July 5 – Bill Van Dyke, outfielder for the Toledo Maumees, hits for the cycle in a 13–12 loss to the Syracuse Stars.
- July 12 – The visiting Buffalo Bisons pick up a local Brooklyn player named Lewis to pitch in their game against the Brooklyn Ward's Wonders. Lewis allows 20 runs on 13 hits and 7 walks in 3 innings before he is moved to left field for the remainder of the game. It is the only known appearance in the major leagues for Mr. Lewis.
- July 15 – National League leaders, including Albert Spalding, pool $80,000 to keep the New York Giants from going bankrupt in order to maintain an NL presence in New York City.
- July 17 - The first ever battle between two 300 game winners takes place as Tim Keefe of the New York Giants faces Pud Galvin of the Pittsburgh Burghers. New York won 8-2.
- July 18 – Brooklyn Gladiators third baseman Jumbo Davis hits for the cycle in a 7–6 loss to the Louisville Colonels.
- July 21 – Roger Connor, first baseman of the Players' League New York Giants, hits for the cycle against the Buffalo Bisons. New York wins, 7–5.
- July 22 – The Brooklyn Daily Eagle prints an article about a night game scheduled to be played the next evening in Hartford against a visiting Baltimore team.
- July 23 – Harry Stovey becomes the first player in major league history to reach 100 career home runs when he hits one for the Boston Reds in a Players' League game.
- July 27 – The Brooklyn Gladiators, leading 13–8, are forced to forfeit their game against the Columbus Solons in the 8th inning when they run out of game balls.
- August 1 – Outfielder Oyster Burns of the Brooklyn Bridegrooms hits for the cycle against the Pittsburgh Alleghenys.
- August 2 – Arlie Latham, playing for the Chicago Pirates in the Players' League, has his reserve rights, still held by the St. Louis Browns of the American Association, sold to the Cincinnati Reds of the National League for $2,500. Latham leaves the Brotherhood and jumps to the Reds after he is given $500 of the purchase price.
- August 6
  - John Reilly becomes the first player in Major League Baseball history to hit for the cycle for the 3rd time in his career, a record that has since been tied by Bob Meusel and Babe Herman but not surpassed. Reilly's Cincinnati Reds defeat the Pittsburgh Alleghenys, 16-3.
  - Cy Young makes his major league debut with the Cleveland Spiders.
- August 11 – Mickey Welch of the New York Giants records his 300th career win.
- August 12 – Louisville Colonels outfielder Farmer Weaver hits for the cycle in an 18–4 victory over the Syracuse Stars.
- August 16 – Pittsburgh Alleghenys pitcher Bill Phillips sets a record when he allows two grand slams in the same inning, one to Tom Burns and one to Malachi Kittridge, in an 18–5 loss to the Chicago Colts.
- August 25 – The Brooklyn Gladiators, losers of 14 straight who are now 16 games out of 7th place in the American Association and fighting for attendance with the first-place Bridegrooms of the National League and the 2nd-place Brooklyn Ward's Wonders of the Players' League, disband. They are replaced in the AA by the Baltimore Orioles who had previously dropped out of the AA following the 1889 season.
- September 1 – Brooklyn and Pittsburgh work overtime on Labor Day. In the first tripleheader ever – 1 game in the morning and 2 in the afternoon – the Bridegrooms beat the visiting Alleghenys, 10–9, 3–2, and 8–4, at Washington Park. The trio of winning Brooklyn pitchers are Bob Caruthers, Tom Lovett, and Adonis Terry.
- September 6 – In Baltimore, with no umpire present, the Toledo Maumees and the Baltimore Orioles each supply a player to officiate. After 7 innings with the game tied at 2, the Toledo umpire calls the game because of darkness. The Baltimore umpire promptly calls the game a forfeit in favor of the Orioles. The American Association will officially declare the game a tie.
- September 14 – Connie Mack begins his long managerial career when he takes over as interim manager of the Buffalo Bisons of the Players' League.
- September 15 – Ledell Titcomb throws a no-hitter for the American Association Rochester Broncos in a 7–0 win over the Syracuse Stars.
- September 17 – The Philadelphia Athletics of the American Association release or sell most of their players because of severe financial problems. The Athletics finish the season losing all 21 of their remaining scheduled games with assorted pick-up players.
- September 22 – The Boston Reds clinch the Players' League pennant.
- September 23 – George Nicol of the St. Louis Browns throws a no-hitter in his major league debut in a game called after seven innings due to darkness. Ed Cartwright chips in with a three-run home run and a grand slam in an 11-run third inning of the 21–2 rout.
- September 29 – The Louisville Colonels, who had finished last in 1889, clinch the American Association pennant with a 6–1 win over the Syracuse Stars.
- September 30 – Chicago Colts outfielder Walt Wilmot, who will tie for the National League lead in home runs, is called out twice in one game for being struck by a batted ball while base-running.
- September 30 – The Brooklyn Bridegrooms clinch the National League pennant.

=== October–December ===
- October 3 – In a game called because of darkness after seven innings, Chicago's Pat Luby beats the Giants, 3–2, for his 17th consecutive win. Amos Rusie is the losing pitcher.
- October 9 – Cincinnati Reds owner, Aaron Stern, sells the club for $48,000 to club owners in the Players' League.
- October 12 – Hank Gastright of the Columbus Solons pitches a no-hitter against the Toledo Maumees in a game called after 8 innings.
- October 17 – The Brooklyn Bridegrooms win game one of the World Series, 9–0, over the Louisville Colonels.
- November 22 – At the American Association annual meeting in Louisville, the Philadelphia Athletics are expelled for violating the league's constitution. A new team in Philadelphia is admitted, plus entries from Boston, Washington, and Cincinnati, replacing Syracuse, Toledo, and Rochester.

== Births ==
=== January–April ===
- January 4 – Ossie Vitt
- January 5 – Benny Kauff
- January 11 – Max Carey
- January 16 – Erskine Mayer *
- January 17 – Louis Santop
- January 23 – Ed Barney
- February 3 – Larry MacPhail **
- February 4
  - Eddie Ainsmith
  - Possum Whitted
- February 5 – Max Flack
- February 20 – Sam Rice
- March 28 – Dee Walsh
- April 6 – Red Smith
- April 14 – Dick Redding
- April 22 – Fred House
- Some sources show 1889
  ** Some sources show 1888

=== May–August ===
- May 14 – Alex Pompez
- June 3 – José Junco
- June 17 – Phil Douglas
- June 20 – Cumberland Posey
- June 27 – Rube Benton
- June 28 – Ken Williams
- July 8
  - Rowdy Elliott
  - Wally Mayer
  - Ivey Wingo
- July 21 – Howie Shanks
- July 30 – Casey Stengel
- August 4 – Dolf Luque
- August 16 – Baby Doll Jacobson
- August 18 – Buck Weaver
- August 22 – Urban Shocker

=== September–December ===
- September 8 – Press Cruthers
- September 19 – Stuffy McInnis
- September 24 – Mike González
- October 16 – Milo Allison
- October 29 – Happy Finneran
- November 16 – Jake Munch
- November 23 – Al Halt
- December 4 – Bob Shawkey
- December 27 – Ernie Krueger
- December 30 – Jim Viox

== Deaths ==
- January 13 – Buck Gladmon, 26, third baseman who played from 1883 to 1886.
- February 1 – George Trenwith, 38?, third baseman for the 1875 Philadelphia Centennials.
- February 4 – Ed Greer, 26, outfielder who played from 1885 to 1887.
- February 22 – Bill Blair, 26, pitched in 1888 for the Philadelphia Athletics of the American Association.
- March 9 – Jake Goodman, 36, first baseman for the 1878 Milwaukee Grays.
- April 25 – Charlie Hodnett, 29?, pitcher who went 12–2 for the 1884 St. Louis Maroons.
- June 12 – Warren White, 46?, starting third baseman for 6 different teams from 1871 to 1875, 1884.
- June 20 – John Weyhing, 20, pitcher who made eight starts for 1888 Cincinnati Red Stockings, one inning for 1889 Columbus team; brother of star pitcher Gus.
- September 26 – Jerry Moore, 35?, reserve catcher from 1884 to 1885.
- October 14 – Gus Williams, 20?, pitched in 2 games for the 1890 Brooklyn Gladiators.
- November 9 – Jim Lillie, outfielder from 1883 to 1886.
