= Philadelphia Athletics (American Association) =

Played in the American Association from 1882 through 1890

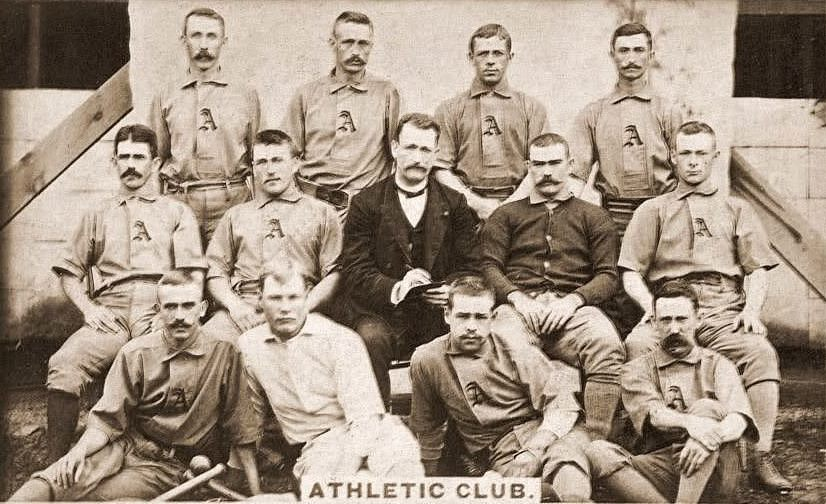
- Logo 1887 team photo

Information
- League: American Association
- Founded: 1882
- Folded: 1890
- Former ballparks: Jefferson Street Grounds (1883–1890); Oakdale Park (1882)
- Ownership: Bill Sharsig, H. C. Pennypacker & William Whitaker (1888–1890); Bill Sharsig, Lew Simmons & Charlie Mason (1881–1887)
- Manager: Bill Sharsig (1888–1890); Charlie Mason (1887); Frank Bancroft (1887); Lew Simmons & Bill Sharsig (1886); Harry Stovey (1885); Lon Knight (1883–1884); Juice Latham (1882); Horace Phillips (1881)

The Philadelphia Athletics were a professional baseball team, one of six charter members of the American Association, a 19th-century major league, which began play in 1882 as a rival to the National League. The other teams were the Baltimore Orioles, Cincinnati Red Stockings, Eclipse of Louisville, Pittsburgh Alleghenys, and St. Louis Brown Stockings. The team took its name from a previous team, which played in the National Association from 1871 through 1875 and in the National League in 1876.

== Overview ==
The Athletics were founded by businessman Bill Sharsig in September 1880. In 1881, the team went on a barnstorming tour, and Sharsig took on two partners: player Charlie Mason and manager Horace Phillips. After the tour, Phillips jumped ship to the competing Quakers and was replaced on the management team by minstrel show performer Lew Simmons.

The Athletics were successful both on and off the field during the early part of their existence. After winning the AA in 1883, in 1884 it was said that Sharsig, Simmons and Mason had cleared between $200,000 and $300,000 in just three years, then the greatest financial success scored in baseball.

Over the nine years of their existence, the Athletics were a successful club on the field, winning 633 games and losing 564, for a winning percentage of .529. The team won the AA pennant in 1883, finishing one game ahead of the St. Louis team. That same year, however, the National League set up its own team in Philadelphia, the Philadelphia Phillies. The Phillies finished last in 1883, but soon improved on the field and at the gate.

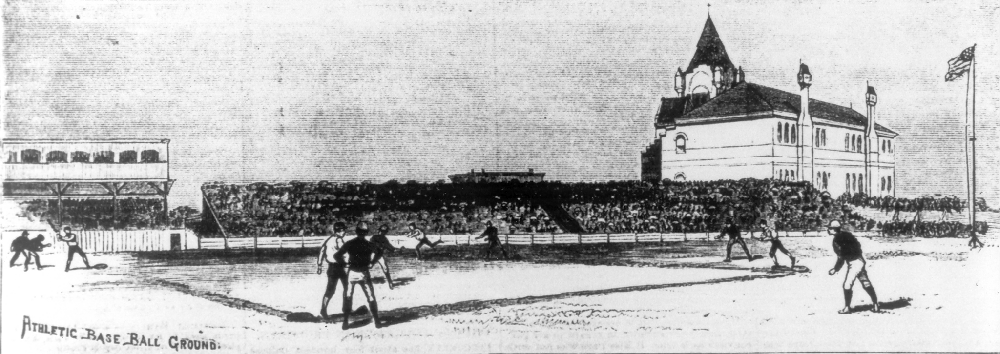
Athletic Base Ball Grounds, 27th and Master Streets, during 1883 season

Their home games were played at Oakdale Park in 1882, and at the Jefferson Street Grounds from 1883 to 1890. In addition, games were also occasionally played at Gloucester Point Grounds. They had eight different managers, with co-owner Bill Sharsig having the longest tenure.

Notable players for the Athletics included future Baseball Hall of Fame member Wilbert Robinson and Al Atkinson. Atkinson is one of the few pitchers to throw more than one no-hitter, and he threw them both for the Athletics, on May 24, 1884 and May 1, 1886. In the first no-hitter Atkinson beaned leadoff hitter Ed Swartwood and then retired 27 batters in a row. In 1888 the Athletics had two no-hitters within a week, with Ed Seward throwing one on July 26 and Gus Weyhing on July 31.

After the 1887 season, Sharsig bought out Mason and Simmons, selling their shares of the club to H. C. Pennypacker and William Whittaker.

== Collapse of 1890 ==
The last straw for the AA Athletics, and several other American Association teams, was the creation of the Players' League in 1890. The established leagues lost players to the upstart league, player salaries soared (by the standards of the day), and there simply were not enough fans to support three baseball leagues. The Athletics also had problems with their own payroll, with the salaries of Pennypacker and Whittaker causing additional financial trouble.

Though the Players' League folded after a single season, it had taken its toll. In September 1890, the Athletics released or sold their players and finished the season with a pick-up team, losing the final 21 games. The Athletics were expelled by the league at the end of the season and was replaced by a new Philadelphia Athletics team, which previously played in the Players' League as the Quakers. The new team hired Sharsig as manager.

== See also ==
- 1882 Philadelphia Athletics season
- 1883 Philadelphia Athletics season
- 1884 Philadelphia Athletics season
- 1885 Philadelphia Athletics season
- 1886 Philadelphia Athletics season
- 1887 Philadelphia Athletics season
- 1888 Philadelphia Athletics season
- 1889 Philadelphia Athletics season
- 1890 Philadelphia Athletics season
- Philadelphia Athletics (American Association) all-time roster
