= 1890 Rochester Broncos season =

1890 Rochester Broncos
- League: American Association
- Ballpark: Culver Field
- City: Rochester, New York
- Record: 63–63 (.500)
- League place: 5th
- Manager: Pat Powers

The 1890 Rochester Broncos season was the team's only season in Major League Baseball. In 1889, the team had played in the minor league International Association as the Rochester Jingoes. The Broncos went 63–63 during the season and finished 5th in the American Association. They went 40–22 at home, but 23–41 on the road. After the season, the team returned to the minor leagues, moving to the Eastern Association as the Rochester Hop Bitters.

== Regular season ==
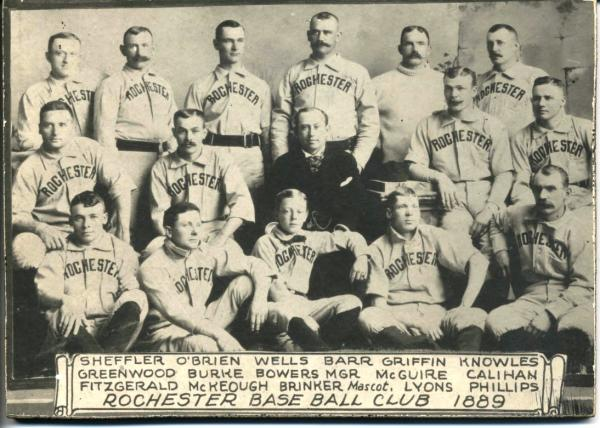
Rochester Broncos

Harry Lyons led the league in at bats and in outs. Sandy Griffin was tied for 4th in the league in doubles. Jimmy Knowles was 4th in RBIs. Ted Scheffler was 2nd in stolen bases, 4th in hit by pitches, and tied for 4th in bases on balls.

Bob Barr was 1st in the league in walks issued and tied for 1st in games lost. Barr was 2nd in the league in games pitched, games started, complete games, batters faced, hits allowed, earned runs, and innings pitched. He was 4th in wins and in wild pitches. He was 5th in strikeouts and tied for 5th in shutouts.

The team had the third best ERA in the league. At 17, Harvey Blauvelt was the league's youngest player.

=== Season standings ===
American Association
Team	W	L	Pct.	GB	Home	Road
Louisville Colonels	88	44	.667	—	57‍–‍13	31‍–‍31
Columbus Solons	79	55	.590	10	47‍–‍22	32‍–‍33
St. Louis Browns	78	58	.574	12	45‍–‍25	33‍–‍33
Toledo Maumees	68	64	.515	20	40‍–‍27	28‍–‍37
Rochester Broncos	63	63	.500	22	40‍–‍22	23‍–‍41
Baltimore Orioles	15	19	.441	24	8‍–‍11	7‍–‍8
Syracuse Stars	55	72	.433	30½	30‍–‍30	25‍–‍42
Philadelphia Athletics	54	78	.409	34	36‍–‍36	18‍–‍42
Brooklyn Gladiators	26	73	.263	45½	15‍–‍22	11‍–‍51

=== Record vs. opponents ===
1890 American Association record Sources:
Team	BAL	BKG	COL	LOU	PHA	RCH	STL	SYR	TOL
Baltimore	—	0–0	2–4–2	1–2–1	2–2	5–1	2–5	1–2	2–3–1
Brooklyn	0–0	—	5–9	2–13	2–10	3–10–1	4–10	5–12	5–9
Columbus	4–2–2	9–5	—	10–8–1	11–9	10–9–1	12–8–2	10–7	13–7
Louisville	2–1–1	13–2	8–10–1	—	17–3	11–6–2	9–11	14–5	14–6
Philadelphia	2–2	10–2	9–11	3–17	—	7–12	7–13	10–7	6–14
Rochester	1–5	10–3–1	9–10–1	6–11–2	12–7	—	8–12–1	11–4–1	6–11–1
St. Louis	5–2	10–4	8–12–2	11–9	13–7	12–8–1	—	10–9	9–7
Syracuse	2–1	12–5	7–10	5–14	7–10	4–11–1	9–10	—	9–11
Toledo	3–2–1	9–5	7–13	6–14	14–6	11–6–1	7–9	11–9	—

=== Roster ===
1890 Rochester Broncos
Roster
Pitchers: Bob Barr; Harvey Blauvelt; Will Calihan; John Fitzgerald; Bob Miller; Ledell Titcomb	Catchers: Deacon McGuire; Dave McKeough; Infielders: Jim Field; Bill Greenwood; John Grim; Jimmy Knowles; Tom O'Brien; Marr Phillips; Leo Smith	Outfielders: Dan Burke; Sandy Griffin; Harry Lyons; Phil Reccius; Ted Scheffler	Manager: Pat Powers

== Player stats ==
=== Batting ===
==== Starters by position ====
Note: Pos = Position; G = Games played; AB = At bats; H = Hits; Avg. = Batting average; HR = Home runs; RBI = Runs batted in

Pos	Player	G	AB	H	Avg.	HR	RBI
C	Deacon McGuire	87	331	99	.299	4	53
1B	Tom O'Brien	73	273	52	.190	0	31
2B	Bill Greenwood	124	437	97	.222	2	41
3B	Jimmy Knowles	123	491	138	.281	5	84
SS	Marr Phillips	64	257	53	.206	0	34
OF	Harry Lyons	133	584	152	.260	3	58
OF	Ted Scheffler	119	445	109	.245	3	34
OF	Sandy Griffin	107	407	125	.307	5	53

==== Other batters ====
Note: G = Games played; AB = At bats; H = Hits; Avg. = Batting average; HR = Home runs; RBI = Runs batted in

Player	G	AB	H	Avg.	HR	RBI
Dave McKeough	62	218	49	.225	0	20
John Grim	50	192	51	.266	2	34
Jim Field	52	188	38	.281	4	25
Leo Smith	35	112	21	.188	0	11
Dan Burke	32	102	22	.216	0	9
Phil Reccius	1	4	0	.000	0	1

=== Pitching ===
==== Starting pitchers ====
Note: G = Games pitched; IP = Innings pitched; W = Wins; L = Losses; ERA = Earned run average; SO = Strikeouts

Player	G	IP	W	L	ERA	SO
Bob Barr	57	493.1	28	24	3.25	209
Will Calihan	37	296.1	18	15	3.28	127
Ledell Titcomb	20	168.2	10	9	3.74	73
Bob Miller	13	92.1	3	7	4.29	20
John Fitzgerald	11	78.0	3	8	4.04	35

==== Other pitchers ====
Note: G = Games pitched; IP = Innings pitched; W = Wins; L = Losses; ERA = Earned run average; SO = Strikeouts

Player	G	IP	W	L	ERA	SO
Jim Field	2	9.2	1	0	2.79	2

==== Relief pitchers ====
Note: G = Games pitched; W = Wins; L = Losses; SV = Saves; ERA = Earned run average; SO = Strikeouts

Player	G	W	L	SV	ERA	SO
Harvey Blauvelt	2	0	0	0	10.22	5
Deacon McGuire	1	0	0	0	6.75	1
Harry Lyons	1	0	0	0	12.27	2
John Grim	1	0	0	0	0.00	3
