= Rochester Broncos all-time roster =

List of baseball players

The Rochester Broncos were a professional baseball team that played in the American Association for one season in 1890. During their only season in existence, the team finished fifth in the AA with a record of 63–63.

== Players ==
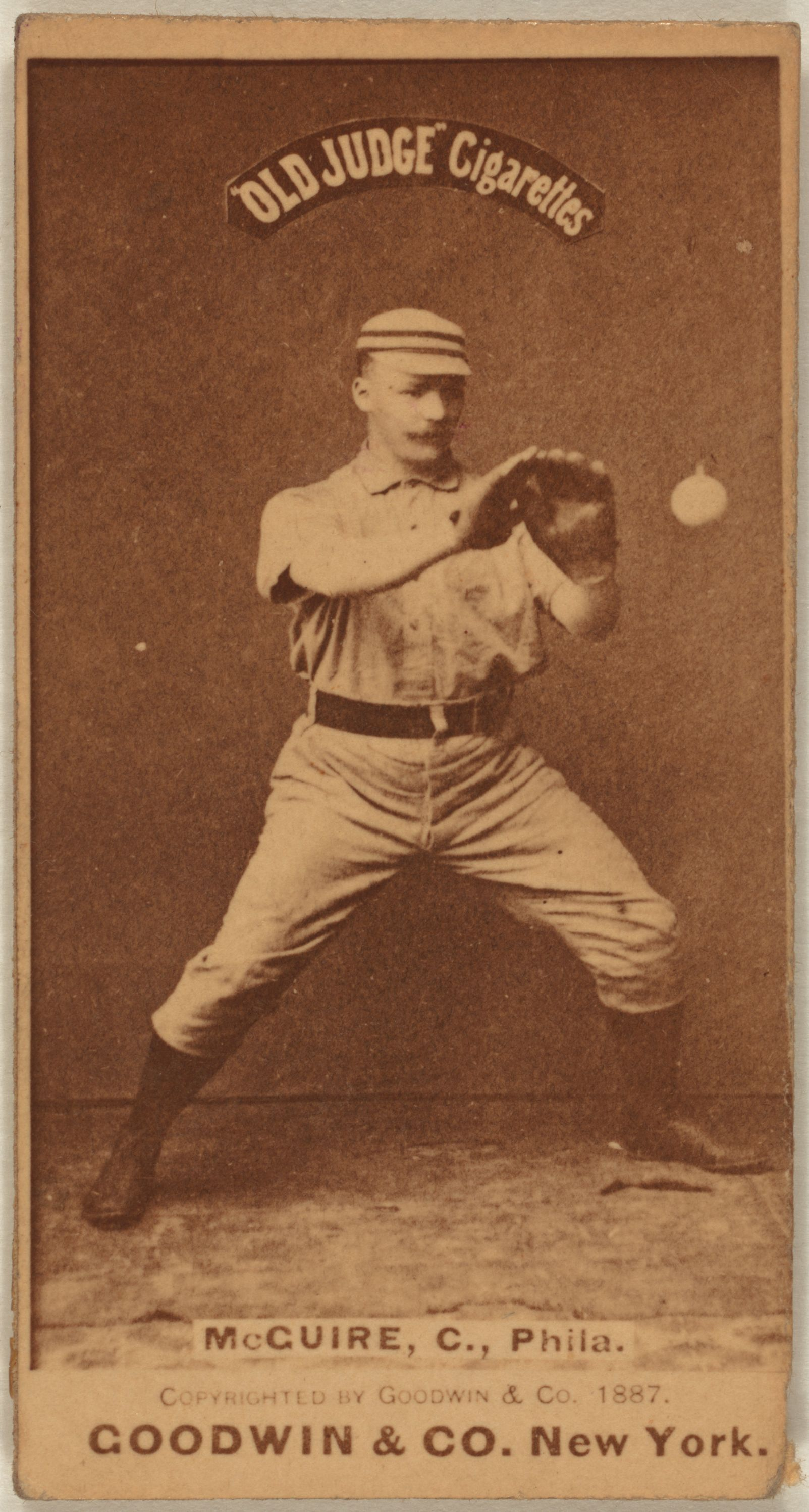
Catcher Deacon McGuire

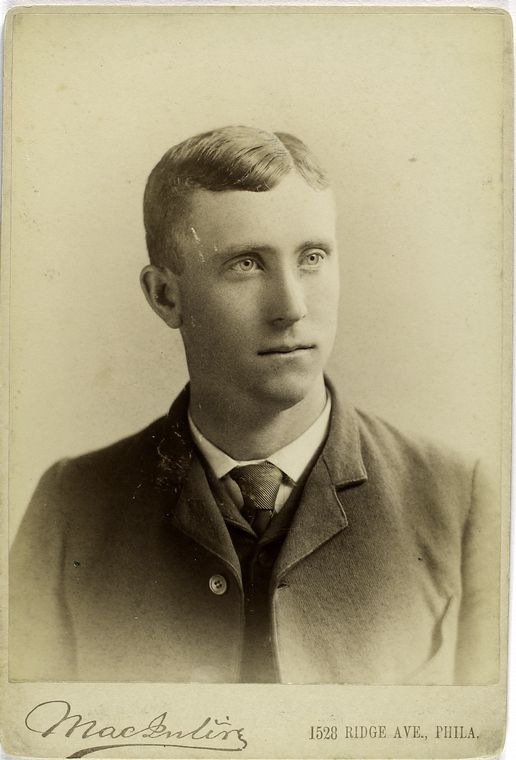
Pitcher Ledell Titcomb

Players who played for the Rochester Broncos, primary position played, and season(s) played for franchise
Player	Position(s)	Season(s)	Notes	Ref
Bob Barr	Pitcher	1890	Barr led the Broncos in wins (28) and strikeouts (209).	
Harvey Blauvelt	Pitcher	1890		
Dan Burke	Center fielder	1890		
Will Calihan	Pitcher	1890		
Jim Field	First baseman	1890		
John Fitzgerald	Pitcher	1890		
Bill Greenwood	Second baseman	1890		
Sandy Griffin	Center fielder	1890	Griffin led the Broncos in batting average (.307).	
John Grim	Shortstop / Catcher	1890		
Jimmy Knowles	Third baseman	1890	Knowles led the Broncos in runs batted in (84).	
Harry Lyons	Left fielder	1890	Lyons led the Broncos in hits (152).	
Deacon McGuire	Catcher	1890		
Dave McKeough	Catcher	1890		
Bob Miller	Pitcher	1890		
Tom O'Brien	First baseman	1890		
Marr Phillips	Shortstop	1890		
Phil Reccius	Right fielder	1890		
Ted Scheffler	Right fielder	1890	Scheffler led the Broncos in runs scored (111) and stolen bases (77).	
Leo Smith	Shortstop	1890		
Ledell Titcomb	Pitcher	1890		
