= Washington Senators (1891–1899) all-time roster =

List of baseball players

- The following is a list of players and who appeared in at least one game for the **Washington Senators** franchise of Major League Baseball, which played as the **Washington Statesmen** in the American Association in 1891 and as the Senators in the National League from 1892 until 1899. Players in **bold** are in the Baseball Hall of Fame.

== A ==
- Bert Abbey
- Charlie Abbey
- Billy Alvord
- Doc Amole
- John Anderson
- Varney Anderson
- Charlie Atherton

== B ==
- Jersey Bakely
- Kirtley Baker
- Shad Barry
- Ed Beecher
- Tun Berger
- Frank Bonner
- Andy Boswell
- Jake Boyd
- **Roger Bresnahan**
- Tom Brown
- Fred Buckingham
- Jim Burns
- Dick Butler

== C ==
- Count Campau
- Charlie Carr
- Kid Carsey
- Ed Cartwright
- Doc Casey
- Ed Cassian
- Pete Cassidy
- Dan Coogan
- Jimmy Cooney
- Joe Corbett
- Bill Coughlin
- Jack Crooks
- Ervin Curtis

== D ==
- Ed Daily
- Harry Davis
- Jumbo Davis
- George Decker
- Gene DeMontreville
- Bill Dinneen
- John Dolan
- Wild Bill Donovan
- Patsy Donovan
- Tommy Dowd
- Tom Dowse
- Jack Doyle
- Jake Drauby
- Charlie Duffee
- Dan Dugdale
- Jim Duncan
- Davey Dunkle
- Fred Dunlap
- Jesse Duryea

== E ==
- Bill Eagle
- Rip Egan
- Ed Eiteljorge
- Duke Esper
- Roy Evans

== F ==
- Duke Farrell
- Jim Field
- Jack Fifield
- Carney Flynn
- Frank Foreman
- Bill Fox
- Buck Freeman

== G ==
- Hank Gastright
- Frank Gatins
- Les German
- Jake Gettman
- Jack Gilbert
- John Gilroy
- Jack Glasscock
- Ed Glenn
- John Graff
- Sandy Griffin

== H ==
- George Haddock
- Tom Hart
- Bill Hassamaer
- Gil Hatfield
- Lefty Herring
- Mike Heydon
- Paul Hines
- Dummy Hoy
- Billy Hulen

== I ==
- Bert Inks

== J ==
- Alex Jones
- Bill Joyce

== K ==
- George Keefe
- Frank Killen
- Matt Kilroy
- Silver King
- Tom Kinslow
- Malachi Kittridge
- Phil Knell

== L ==
- Henry Larkin
- Arlie Latham
- Tom Leahy
- Bill Leith
- Pete Lohman
- Billy Lush

== M ==
- Harry Mace
- Bill Magee
- Dan Mahoney
- John Malarkey
- Al Maul
- Al McCauley
- Bill McCauley
- Pat McCauley
- Dan McFarlan
- Dan McGann
- Deacon McGuire
- Bob McHale
- Doc McJames
- Tom McLaughlin
- Frank McManus
- Mart McQuaid
- Mox McQuery
- Jouett Meekin
- Win Mercer
- Bob Miller
- Kohly Miller
- Jocko Milligan
- Kid Mohler
- Carlton Molesworth
- Joe Mulvey
- Larry Murphy
- Miah Murray
- Bert Myers

== N ==
- Parson Nicholson
- Effie Norton

== O ==
- Jack O'Brien
- John O'Brien
- Hal O'Hagan
- **Jim O'Rourke**
- Tim O'Rourke

== P ==
- Dick Padden
- Charlie Petty
- Doc Potts
- Doc Powers
- Oscar Purner

== Q ==
- Bill Quarles

== R ==
- Paul Radford
- Harry Raymond
- Charlie Reilley
- Heinie Reitz
- Danny Richardson
- Hardy Richardson
- Dorsey Riddlemoser
- Mike Roach
- Yank Robinson
- Jim Rogers

== S ==
- Frank Scheibeck
- Kip Selbach
- Dan Shannon
- Frank Shannon
- Jimmy Slagle
- Mike Slattery
- Will Smalley
- Harvey Smith
- Jud Smith
- Pop Smith
- Pop Snyder
- General Stafford
- Joe Stanley
- Ben Stephens
- Otis Stocksdale
- Cub Stricker
- Willie Sudhoff
- Joe Sugden
- Joe Sullivan
- Marty Sullivan
- Mike Sullivan
- Sy Sutcliffe
- Jack Suthoff
- Cy Swaim

== T ==
- George Tebeau
- Tommy Tucker
- Larry Twitchell

== U ==
- George Ulrich

== V ==
- Joe Visner

== W ==
- Butts Wagner
- Piggy Ward
- Charlie Weber
- Gus Weyhing
- Pop Williams
- Sam Wise
- Phil Wisner
- Joe Woerlin
- Zeke Wrigley
- Bill Wynne
