= List of Washington Senators (1891–1899) managers =

The Washington Senators were a Major League Baseball team that played in Washington, D.C. They played in the American Association when it was considered a major league in 1891 and in the National League from 1892 through 1899, after which the team was eliminated when the National League contracted from twelve teams to eight teams. In their inaugural season, they played as the Washington Statesmen. During their time as a Major League team, the Senators employed 12 managers. The duties of the team manager include team strategy and leadership on and off the field.

The Senators first manager was Sam Trott. Trott managed the Senators for 12 games before being replaced by Pop Snyder. Gus Schmelz holds the Senators' record for most games managed (434), managerial wins (155) and managerial losses (270). Tom Brown and Jack Doyle share the Senators' record for highest winning percentage as manager, with .471. Billy Barnie, who didn't win either of the two games he managed, holds the Senators' record for fewest wins. Arthur Irwin is the only Senators manager who served more than a single term. Irwin was one of three managers the Senators employed in its first National League season of 1892, and also the last Senators manager. In total, Irwin managed 293 games for the Senators, with 110 wins and 177 losses for a winning percentage of .383. Jim O'Rourke is the only Senators manager to be inducted into the Baseball Hall of Fame.

== Key ==
| # | A running total of the number of Colonels managers. Any manager who has two or more separate terms is counted only once. |
| G | Regular season games managed; may not equal sum of wins and losses due to tie games |
| W | Regular season wins |
| L | Regular season losses |
| Win% | Winning percentage |
| Ref | Reference |
| † | Elected to the National Baseball Hall of Fame |

== Managers ==
| #^{[a]} | Image | Manager | Seasons | G | W | L | Win% | Ref |
|---|---|---|---|---|---|---|---|---|
| 1 | | Sam Trott | 1891 | 12 | 4 | 7 | .364 | |
| 2 | | Pop Snyder | 1891 | 70 | 23 | 46 | .333 | |
| 3 | | Dan Shannon | 1891 | 51 | 15 | 34 | .306 | |
| 4 | | Sandy Griffin | 1891 | 6 | 2 | 4 | .333 | |
| 5 | | Billy Barnie | 1892 | 2 | 0 | 2 | .000 | |
| 6 | | Arthur Irwin | 1892 | 108 | 46 | 60 | .434 | |
| 7 | | Danny Richardson | 1892 | 43 | 12 | 31 | .279 | |
| 8 | | Jim O'Rourke^{†} | 1893 | 130 | 40 | 89 | .310 | |
| 9 | | Gus Schmelz | 1894–1897 | 434 | 155 | 270 | .365 | |
| 10 | | Tom Brown | 1897–1898 | 137 | 64 | 72 | .471 | |
| 11 | | Jack Doyle | 1898 | 17 | 8 | 9 | .471 | |
| 12 | | Deacon McGuire | 1898 | 70 | 21 | 47 | .309 | |
| — | | Arthur Irwin | 1898–1899 | 185 | 64 | 117 | .354 | |
| Totals | | 12 managers | 9 seasons | 1,265 | 454 | 788 | .366 | |
