= 1898 Major League Baseball season =

1898 MLB season
- League: National League (NL)
- Sport: Baseball
- Duration: April 15 – October 15, 1898
- Games: 154
- Teams: 12

Pennant winner
- NL champions: Boston Beaneaters
- NL runners-up: Baltimore Orioles

MLB seasons
- ← 1897 1899 →

Locations of teams for the 1898 National League season
National League

The 1898 major league baseball season began on April 15, 1898. The regular season ended on October 15, with the Boston Beaneaters as the pennant winner of the National League. Due to lack of enthusiasm from both players and fans, the Temple Cup which had taken place in the four previous seasons was not held, nor was there any other form of a postseason.

The Chicago Colts renamed as the Chicago Orphans.

== Schedule ==
The 1898 schedule consisted of 154 games for the twelve teams of the National League. Each team was scheduled to play 14 games against the other eleven teams in the league. This format saw an increase to the previously used format, which had each team play 12 games against each other, and had resulted in a total of 132 games. The 154-game format had previously been used by the National League in 1892.

Opening Day took place on April 15 featuring six teams. The final day of the season was on October 15, featuring eight teams.

== Rule changes ==
The 1898 season saw the following rule changes:

- Umpires are now allowed to suspend a player for up to three games (including the one which he was ejected) for "kicking."
- Uniformed players who were not in-game could not sit with spectators.

== Teams ==
League	Team	City	Ballpark	Capacity	Manager
National League	Baltimore Orioles	Baltimore, Maryland	Union Park	6,500	Ned Hanlon
National League	Boston Beaneaters	Boston, Massachusetts	South End Grounds	6,600	Frank Selee
National League	Brooklyn Bridegrooms	New York, New York	Washington Park	12,000	Billy Barnie
National League	Brooklyn Bridegrooms	New York, New York	Washington Park	12,000	Mike Griffin
National League	Brooklyn Bridegrooms	New York, New York	Washington Park	12,000	Charles Ebbets
National League	Chicago Orphans	Chicago, Illinois	West Side Park	13,000	Tom Burns
National League	Cincinnati Reds	Cincinnati, Ohio	League Park (Cincinnati)	9,000	Buck Ewing
National League	Cleveland Spiders	Cleveland, Ohio	League Park (Cleveland)	9,000	Patsy Tebeau
National League	Louisville Colonels	Louisville, Kentucky	Eclipse Park	6,400	Fred Clarke
National League	New York Giants	New York, New York	Polo Grounds	16,000	Bill Joyce
National League	New York Giants	New York, New York	Polo Grounds	16,000	Cap Anson
National League	Philadelphia Phillies	Philadelphia, Pennsylvania	National League Park	18,000	George Stallings
National League	Philadelphia Phillies	Philadelphia, Pennsylvania	National League Park	18,000	Bill Shettsline
National League	Pittsburgh Pirates	Allegheny, Pennsylvania	Exposition Park	6,500	Bill Watkins
National League	St. Louis Browns	St. Louis, Missouri	New Sportsman's Park	14,500	Tim Hurst
National League	Washington Senators	Washington, D.C.	Boundary Field	6,500	Tom Brown
National League	Washington Senators	Washington, D.C.	Boundary Field	6,500	Jack Doyle
National League	Washington Senators	Washington, D.C.	Boundary Field	6,500	Deacon McGuire
National League	Washington Senators	Washington, D.C.	Boundary Field	6,500	Arthur Irwin

=== Neutral site and Sunday games ===
The Cleveland Spiders played in 15 neutral site games in which they were treated as the home team. Meanwhile, blue laws restricted Sunday activities in several localities, causing several teams to play at ballparks in a different locality.

Team	City	Ballpark	Capacity	Games played	Type
Brooklyn Bridegrooms	West New York, New Jersey	West New York Field Club Grounds	Unknown	2	Sunday
Cleveland Spiders	Rochester, New York	Culver Field	Unknown	2	Neutral site
Cleveland Spiders	Collinwood, Ohio	Euclid Beach Park	Unknown	2	Sunday
Cleveland Spiders	Philadelphia, Pennsylvania	National League Park	18,000	9	Neutral site
Cleveland Spiders	Charlotte, New York	Ontario Beach Grounds	Unknown	1	Neutral site & Sunday
Cleveland Spiders	St. Louis, Missouri	New Sportsman's Park	14,500	2	Neutral site
Cleveland Spiders	Chicago, Illinois	West Side Park	13,000	1	Neutral site
New York Giants	West New York, New Jersey	West New York Field Club Grounds	Unknown	1	Sunday

1. In today's Pittsburgh, Pennsylvania.
2. In today's Cleveland, Ohio.
3. In today's Rochester, New York.

== Standings ==
=== National League ===
National League
Team	W	L	Pct.	GB	Home	Road
Boston Beaneaters	102	47	.685	—	62‍–‍15	40‍–‍32
Baltimore Orioles	96	53	.644	6	58‍–‍15	38‍–‍38
Cincinnati Reds	92	60	.605	11½	58‍–‍28	34‍–‍32
Chicago Orphans	85	65	.567	17½	58‍–‍31	27‍–‍34
Cleveland Spiders	81	68	.544	21	36‍–‍19	45‍–‍49
Philadelphia Phillies	78	71	.523	24	49‍–‍31	29‍–‍40
New York Giants	77	73	.513	25½	45‍–‍28	32‍–‍45
Pittsburgh Pirates	72	76	.486	29½	39‍–‍35	33‍–‍41
Louisville Colonels	70	81	.464	33	43‍–‍34	27‍–‍47
Brooklyn Bridegrooms	54	91	.372	46	30‍–‍41	24‍–‍50
Washington Senators	51	101	.336	52½	34‍–‍44	17‍–‍57
St. Louis Browns	39	111	.260	63½	20‍–‍44	19‍–‍67

=== Tie games ===
24 tie games, which are not factored into winning percentage or games behind (and were often replayed again), occurred throughout the season.

- Baltimore Orioles, 5
- Boston Beaneaters, 3
- Brooklyn Bridegrooms, 4
- Chicago Orphans, 2
- Cincinnati Reds, 5
- Cleveland Spiders, 7
- Louisville Colonels, 3
- New York Giants, 7
- Philadelphia Phillies, 1
- Pittsburgh Pirates, 4
- St. Louis Browns, 4
- Washington Senators, 3

== Managerial changes ==
=== Off-season ===
Team	Former Manager	New Manager
Chicago Orphans	Cap Anson	Tom Burns
Pittsburgh Pirates	Patsy Donovan	Bill Watkins
St. Louis Browns	Chris von der Ahe	Tim Hurst

=== In-season ===
Team	Former Manager	New Manager
Brooklyn Bridegrooms	Billy Barnie	Mike Griffin
Brooklyn Bridegrooms	Mike Griffin	Charles Ebbets
New York Giants	Bill Joyce	Cap Anson
Philadelphia Phillies	George Stallings	Bill Shettsline
Washington Senators	Tom Brown	Jack Doyle
Washington Senators	Jack Doyle	Deacon McGuire
Washington Senators	Deacon McGuire	Arthur Irwin

== League leaders ==
=== National League ===
Hitting leaders
Stat	Player	Total
AVG	Willie Keeler (BRO)	.385
OPS	Billy Hamilton (BSN)	.933
HR	Jimmy Collins (BSN)	15
RBI	Nap Lajoie (PHI)	127
R	John McGraw (BAL)	143
H	Willie Keeler (BRO)	216
SB	Ed Delahanty (PHI)	58

Pitching leaders
Stat	Player	Total
W	Kid Nichols (BSN)	31
L	Jack Taylor (STL)	29
ERA	Clark Griffith (CHI)	1.88
K	Cy Seymour (NYG)	239
IP	Jack Taylor (STL)	397.1
SV	Kid Nichols (BSN)	4
WHIP	Kid Nichols (BSN)	1.034

== Milestones ==
=== Batters ===
- Bill Duggleby (PHI):
  - Hits a grand slam in his first major league at-bat on April 21, a feat not accomplished again until Jeremy Hermida in 2005.
- Billy Hamilton (BSN):
  - Recorded his 800th career stolen base against the Baltimore Orioles on May 11. He became the first player to reach this mark.
- Hugh Duffy (BSN):
  - Recorded his 500th career stolen base against the Louisville Colonels on May 28. He became the seventh player to reach this mark.
- Billy Hoy (LOU):
  - Recorded his 500th career stolen base against the St. Louis Browns in game two of a doubleheader on June 19. He became the eighth player to reach this mark.

=== Pitchers ===
==== No-hitters ====
- Ted Breitenstein (CIN):
  - Breitenstein threw his second career no-hitter and the second no-hitter in franchise history, by defeating the Pittsburgh Pirates 11–0 on April 22. Breitenstein walked one and struck out two.
- Jay Hughes (BAL):
  - Hughes threw his first career no-hitter and the third no-hitter in franchise history, by defeating the Boston Beaneaters 8–0 on April 22. Hughes walked three and struck out three.
- Red Donahue (PHI):
  - Donahue threw his first career no-hitter and the second no-hitter in franchise history, by defeating the Boston Beaneaters 5–0 on July 8. Donahue walked two and struck out one.
- Walter Thornton (CHI):
  - Thornton threw his first career no-hitter and the fifth no-hitter in franchise history, by defeating the Brooklyn Bridegrooms 2–0 in game 2 of a doubleheader on August 21. Thornton walked three and struck out three.

==== Other pitching accomplishments ====
- Walter Thornton (CHI):
  - Tied a Major League record by becoming the second pitcher to hit three consecutive batters by pitch, the first since 1894, in a game against the St. Louis Browns on May 18.

== Home field attendance ==
Team name	Wins	%±	Home attendance	%±	Per game
Chicago Orphans	85	44.1%	424,352	29.7%	4,768
Cincinnati Reds	92	21.1%	336,378	−0.1%	3,780
New York Giants	77	−7.2%	265,414	−32.0%	3,492
Philadelphia Phillies	78	41.8%	265,414	−8.5%	3,277
Boston Beaneaters	102	9.7%	229,275	−31.5%	2,902
St. Louis Browns	39	34.5%	151,700	11.2%	2,298
Pittsburgh Pirates	72	20.0%	150,900	−9.1%	2,012
Louisville Colonels	70	34.6%	128,980	−11.2%	1,633
Baltimore Orioles	96	6.7%	123,416	−54.8%	1,624
Brooklyn Bridegrooms	54	−11.5%	122,514	−44.5%	1,656
Washington Senators	51	−16.4%	103,250	−31.6%	1,291
Cleveland Spiders	81	17.4%	70,496	−38.8%	1,237

== Venues ==
The Brooklyn Bridegrooms, leave Eastern Park (where they played for seven seasons) and move to Washington Park, where they would go on to play for 15 seasons through 1912.

Regarding games that were rescheduled to Sunday, and existing blue laws:

- Both the Brooklyn Bridegrooms and New York Giants would play at the West New York Field Club Grounds in West New York, New Jersey. The Bridegrooms played two games, on September 18 and October 10, while the Giants played one game on September 11.
- The Cleveland Spiders played at two venues for Sunday games. The team played two games at Euclid Beach Park in Collinwood, Ohio (today in Cleveland) on June 12 and 19, and one game at the Ontario Beach Grounds in Charlotte, New York (today in Rochester) on August 28.

The Cleveland Spiders played 15 of 57 home games (about 26%) outside of the Greater Cleveland area. Excluding the already mentioned Ontario Beach Grounds Sunday game listed above, these neutral site games were played in:

- Culver Field in Rochester, New York, home of the minor league Eastern League Rochester Bronchos (two games, played on August 27 and 29).
- National League Park in Philadelphia, Pennsylvania, home of the Philadelphia Phillies (nine games, including four games on July 29 and 30, and five games between August 5 and 11).
- New Sportsman's Park in St. Louis, Missouri, home of the St. Louis Browns (two games, played on September 28 and 29).
- West Side Park in Chicago, Illinois, home of the Chicago Orphans (one game, played on October 8).

== See also ==
- 1898 in baseball (Events, Births, Deaths)
