= List of Washington Senators managers =

Three Major League baseball franchises have been named the "Washington Senators":

- Washington Senators managers (1891 – 1899) - Managers of defunct National League team
- Washington Senators managers (1901 – 1960) - Managers of American League team that became the Minnesota Twins
- Washington Senators managers (1901 – 1971) - Managers of American League team that became the Texas Rangers
