= List of baseball parks in Rochester, New York =

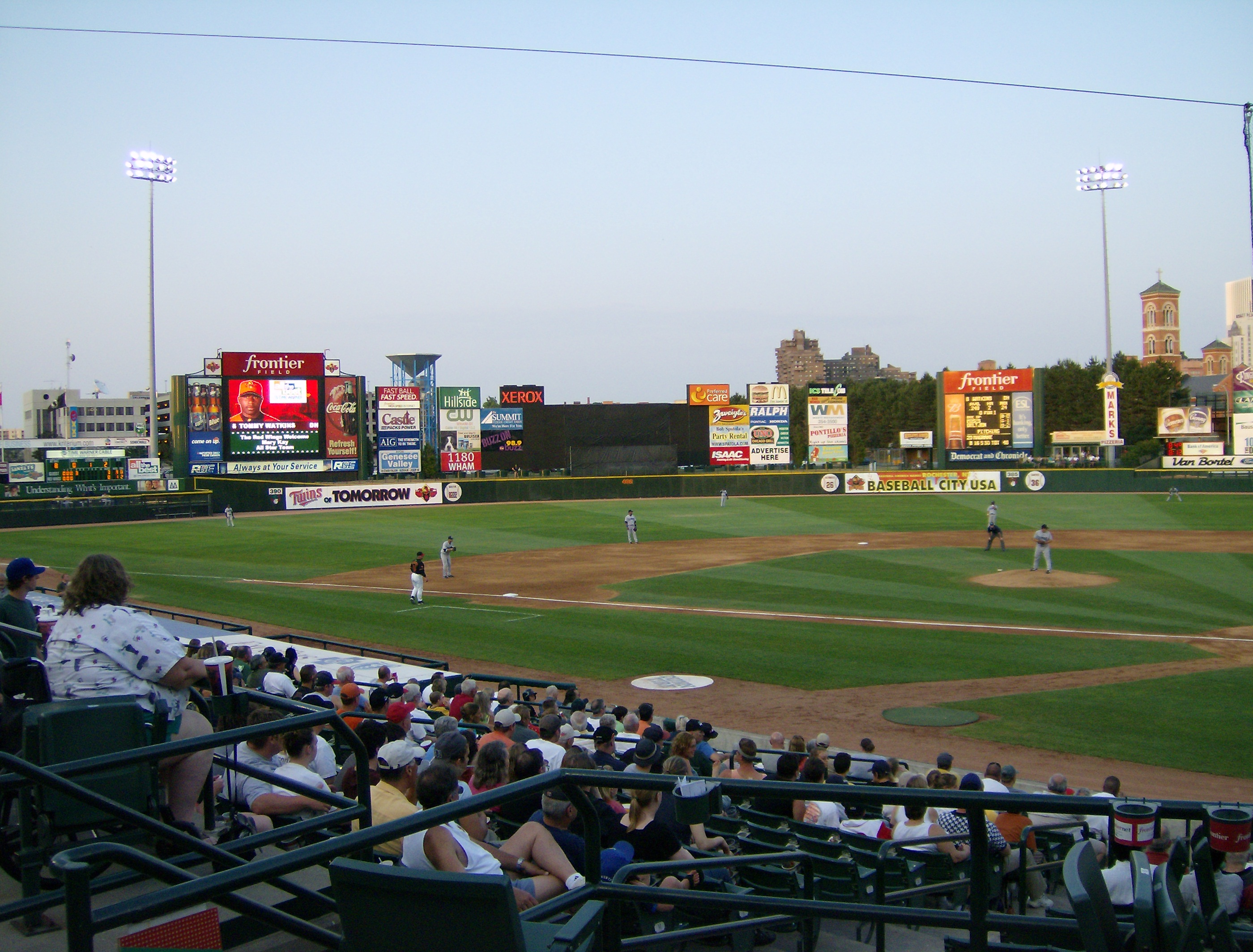
ESL Ballpark

This is a list of venues used for professional baseball in Rochester, New York. The information is a compilation of the information contained in the references listed.

Union Street Base Ball Grounds / Hop Bitters Base Ball Grounds
Home of:

Rochester – International Association (1877–1878)
Rochester – National Association moved from Albany mid-1879 disbanded after season
Rochester Hop Bitters – International Association 1880
Rochester Hop Bitters – New York State League (1885)

Location (based on 1880 map): buildings and Union Street North (southeast, left field); buildings and Tappan (now Lyndhurst) Street (southwest, right field); East Main Street (farther south); Scio Street (northwest, first base); buildings and an alley (northeast, third base)
Currently: residential

Culver Park Grounds (I)
Home of:

Rochester – Eastern League (1886–1887) / International Association (1888–1889) (league disbanded mid-1889)
Rochester – American Association (1890)
Rochester – Eastern League (1891–1892)

Location: Culver Park Road (now University Avenue) (southwest, home plate); Jersey (now Russell) Street (northwest, left field); University Avenue (now Atlantic Avenue) and rail yards (north, center field) – same location as subsequent Culver Park
Destroyed by fire: October 1893 / Rebuilt 1898
Currently: retail stores and Gleason Works, a manufacturer of machine tools

Windsor Beach Base Ball Grounds
Home of: Rochester EL and AA (1888 – 1892) Sunday games
Location: Irondequoit, Windsor Beach, Summerville neighborhood; near Lake Ontario; on the Rome, Watertown and Ogdensburg Railroad (R W & O)
Currently: residential - approximate current site of Norcrest Drive, which is just north of abandoned railroad right-of-way

Riverside Park
Home of:

Rochester Brownies (as in Kodak) – Eastern League (1895–1897) moved to Montreal mid-1897
Rochester Patriots – Eastern League (1898) moved from Scranton / moved to Ottawa mid-season 1898

Location: North St. Paul Street and Genesee River (west); Norton Street (south); Hollenbeck Street (east, probably home plate) – about one block west of the eventual Red Wing Stadium site
Currently: residential

Ontario Beach Grounds
August 28, 1898 – used once for a National League game between Brooklyn and Cleveland
Location: Charlotte section – Beach Avenue and Ontario Beach Park (north, home plate); Genesee River (east, left field); buildings and Broadway (west, right field) – (per a 1902 city map)

Culver Field (II)
Home of: Rochester Bronchos – Eastern League (1899–1907)
August 27 and 29, 1898 – used for a pair of National League games between Brooklyn and Cleveland
Location: University Avenue (southwest, home plate); Russell Street (west, third base); Atlantic Avenue (north, left and center field); Culver Road (southeast, first base) – same location as previous Culver Grounds
Currently: retail stores and Gleason Works, a manufacturer of machine tools

Bay Street Park or Baseball Park at Bay Street
Home of:

Rochester Beau Brummels / Hustlers / Colts / The Tribe – Eastern League (1908–1911) / International League (1912–1928) disbanded after 1927
Rochester Red Wings - International League (1928) moved from Syracuse Stars of 1920–1927

Location: Bay Street (north, third base); Webster Avenue (northwest, plate); McKinster Street (east, left field); Parkside Avenue (south, right field)
Currently: playgrounds, residential, commercial

Red Wing / Silver Stadium
Home of: Rochester Red Wings International League (1929–1996)
Location: 500 Norton Street (south, first base); North Clinton Avenue (west, plate); Bastian Street (north, third base); Joseph Avenue / Seneca Avenue [Excel Drive would have cut through] (east, center field)
Built 1928 – completely refurbished 1986
Currently: industrial and office park

Frontier Field / Innovative Field / ESL Ballpark
Home of: Rochester Red Wings International League (1997 to date)
Location: One Morrie Silver Way (formerly Platt Street) (northwest, third base); Plymouth Avenue North (northeast, left and center fields); Allen Street and I-490 inner loop (southeast, right field); I-490 (southwest, first base)

== See also ==
- Lists of baseball parks
