= Marr Phillips =

American baseball player (1857–1928)

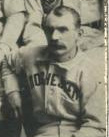
- Shortstop
- Born: June 16, 1857; Pittsburgh, Pennsylvania, U.S.
- Died: April 1, 1928 (aged 70); Pittsburgh, Pennsylvania, U.S.
- Batted: Right Threw: Unknown

MLB debut
- May 1, 1884, for the Indianapolis Hoosiers

Last MLB appearance
- July 25, 1890, for the Rochester Broncos

MLB statistics
- Batting average: .239
- Home runs: 0
- Runs scored: 73
- Stats at Baseball Reference

Teams
- Indianapolis Hoosiers (1884); Detroit Wolverines (1885); Pittsburgh Alleghenys (1885); Rochester Broncos (1890)

Marr B. Phillips (June 16, 1857 – April 1, 1928) was an American professional baseball player whose career spanned from 1877 to 1899. He played four seasons in Major League Baseball as a shortstop for the Indianapolis Hoosiers (1884), Detroit Wolverines (1885), Pittsburgh Alleghenys (1885) and Rochester Bronchos (1890). He also spent 16 seasons in the minor leagues.

== Early years ==
Phillips was born in Pittsburgh, Pennsylvania, in 1857. He began his professional baseball career in 1877 playing for three different clubs in the League Alliance. The following year, he played for the Lynn/Worcester team in the International Association.

After the 1878 season, there is a four-year gap during which Phillips is not reflected as playing in the records maintained by baseball-reference.com. His next listed position is with the Fort Wayne Hoosiers of the Northwestern League in 1883.

== Indianapolis and Detroit ==
In 1884, Phillips made his major league debut with the Indianapolis Hoosiers of the American Association. He appeared in 97 games, all at shortstop, and compiled a .269 batting average.

In 1885, Phillips sent most of the season with the Detroit Wolverines of the National League. He appeared in 33 games, all at shortstop, and compiled a .209 batting average. Phillips also appeared in four games for the Pittsburgh Alleghenys in 1885.

== Return to minors ==
After two years in the majors, Phillips returned to the minors for four years from 1886 to 1889. He played for the Charleston Seagulls and Augusta Browns in the Southern Association and then spent the 1887 and 1888 seasons in Canada playing for the Hamilton Hams in the International Association. He spent the 1889 season with the Rochester Jingoes in the International League.

== Rochester ==
Phillips returned to the major leagues for one last season in 1890. He appeared in 64 games for the Rochester Bronchos, all at shortstop, and compiled a .206 batting average.

== Later years ==
After his major league career ended, Phillips continued playing in the minor leagues for another nine years. He spent much of this time in Troy, New York playing all or parts of the 1891 to 1895 seasons for the Troy Trojans. He spent the last four years of his professional baseball career back in Canada with the Hamilton Hams and Hamilton Blackbirds.

Phillips died in Pittsburgh in 1928 at age 70.
