= Frank Shannon (baseball) =

American baseball player (1873–1934)

- Shortstop
- Born: December 3, 1873; San Francisco, California, U.S.
- Died: February 27, 1934 (aged 60); Boston, Massachusetts, U.S.
- Batted: Unknown Threw: Unknown

MLB debut
- October 1, 1892, for the Washington Senators

Last MLB appearance
- June 20, 1896, for the Louisville Colonels

MLB statistics
- Batting average: .160
- Home runs: 1
- Runs batted in: 17
- Stats at Baseball Reference

Teams
- Washington Senators (1892); Louisville Colonels (1896)

John Francis Shannon (December 3, 1873 – February 27, 1934) was an American Major League Baseball shortstop. He played in one game for the Washington Senators of the National League on October 1, 1892, and later played in 31 games for the Louisville Colonels in 1896. His minor league career stretched from 1893 to 1910, mostly in the New England League or the Eastern League.
