= Walter Thornton =

American baseball player (1875–1960)

- Outfielder / Pitcher
- Born: February 18, 1875; Peoria, Illinois, U.S.
- Died: July 14, 1960 (aged 85); Los Angeles, California, U.S.
- Batted: Left Threw: Left

MLB debut
- July 1, 1895, for the Chicago Colts

Last MLB appearance
- October 8, 1898, for the Chicago Orphans

MLB statistics
- Win–loss record: 23–18
- Earned run average: 4.18
- Batting average: .312
- Stats at Baseball Reference

Teams
- Chicago Colts/Orphans (1895–1898)

Career highlights and awards
- Pitched a no-hitter on August 21, 1898 against the Brooklyn Bridegrooms

Walter Miller Thornton (February 18, 1875 – July 14, 1960) was an American Major League Baseball pitcher who played from 1895 through 1898 for the Chicago Colts / Orphans.

A skilled athlete who excelled in baseball, Thornton pitched Snohomish, Washington, to the state's amateur championship in 1893. In the spring of 1895, two Cornell College graduates who owned the Snohomish Tribune arranged a scholarship for Thornton to attend Cornell. He dominated the college competition and was invited to a tryout with the Chicago Colts (later the Chicago Cubs) National League baseball team. He made his major league debut on July 1, 1895, while still enrolled at Cornell.

He pitched a no-hitter on August 21, 1898, against the Brooklyn Bridegrooms, a 2–0 victory. In 1896, Thornton married a Cornell teacher, Sarah Andrews, director of the School of Oratory and Physical Culture. She was 26, he was 21. After a salary dispute ended his major league baseball career, the Thorntons returned to the Pacific Northwest, where Walter played semi-pro ball and worked in Everett, Washington. In 1901, Thornton compiled what is arguably the county's best baseball team. The Everett semi-pro team won its first 27 games and shut out professional teams from Spokane, Seattle and Tacoma.

In 1910, an evangelist named Billy Sunday, a former professional baseball player for the Chicago White Stockings and the Pittsburgh Alleghenys, brought a six-week religious campaign to Everett. Thornton became a lifelong follower of Sunday and his religious teachings. He later moved to Los Angeles in the 1920s, after Sarah's death, to become a street preacher and help the poor. In July 1960, Thornton died in a Los Angeles hotel, and was cremated.

== See also ==
- List of Major League Baseball no-hitters

Achievements
Preceded by Red Donahue	No-hitter pitcher August 21, 1898	Succeeded by Deacon Phillippe
