= George Ulrich (baseball) =

American baseball player (1869–1918)

- Outfielder
- Born: June 5, 1869; Philadelphia, Pennsylvania, US
- Died: January 19, 1918 (aged 48); Mount Joy, Pennsylvania, US

MLB debut
- May 1, 1892, for the Washington Senators

Last MLB appearance
- August 7, 1896, for the New York Giants

MLB statistics
- Batting average: .208
- Hits: 15
- Stolen bases: 3
- Stats at Baseball Reference

Teams
- Washington Senators (1892); Cincinnati Reds (1893); New York Giants (1896)

George F. Ulrich (June 5, 1869 – January 19, 1918) was an American Major League Baseball outfielder who played for three seasons. He played for the Washington Senators in 1892, the Cincinnati Reds in 1893, and the New York Giants in 1896.
