= Buffalo Bisons (IA) =

19th century Minor League Baseball team

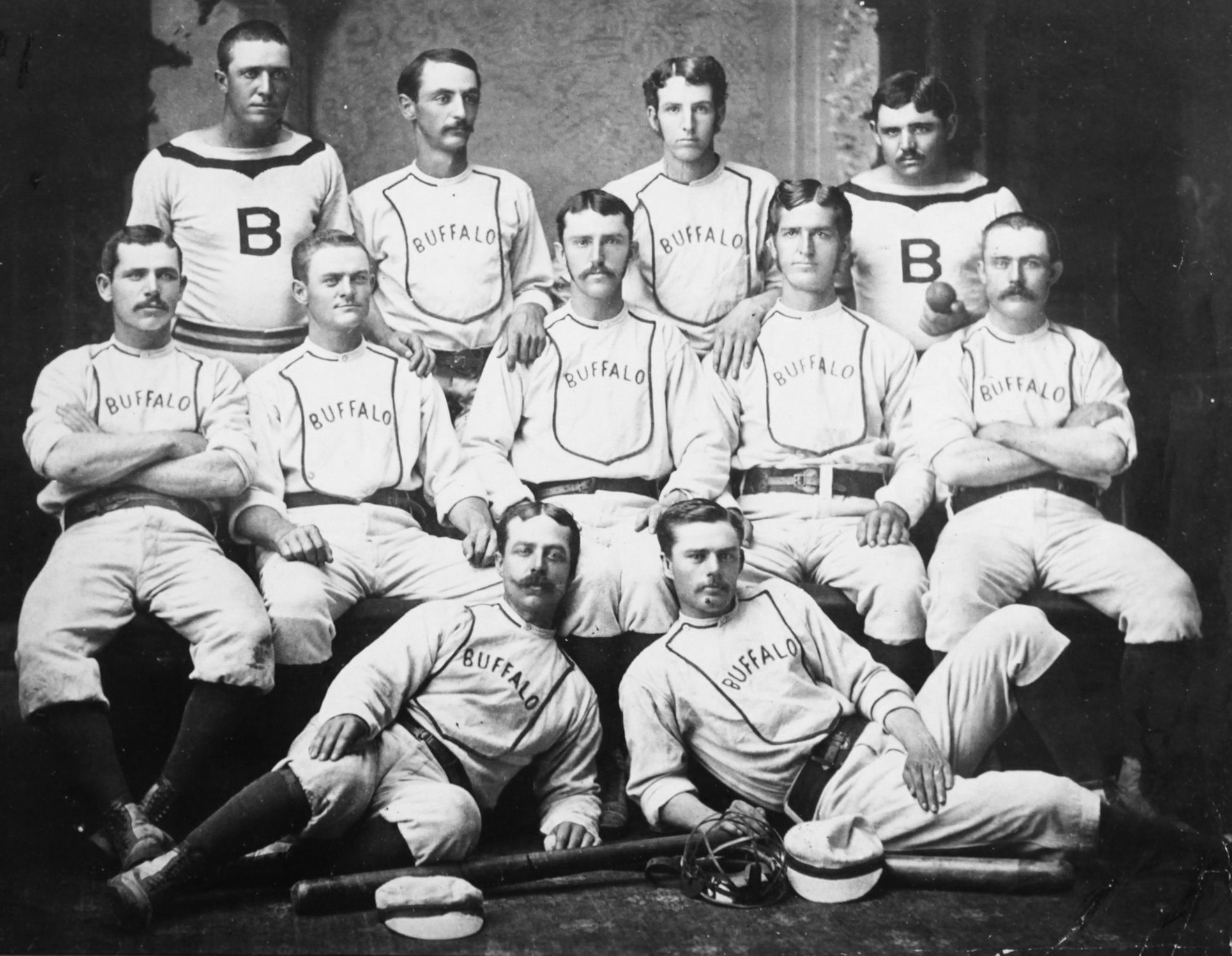
The 1878 Buffalo Bisons

The Buffalo Bisons were a minor league baseball team based in Buffalo, New York, that played in the International Association for Professional Base Ball Players in 1878, 1887 and 1888. The 1878 version of the club won the league championship and then joined the National League in 1879 as the Buffalo Bisons. The 1887 and 1888 team featured Baseball Hall of Famer Frank Grant.

== National Baseball Hall of Fame members ==
Player/Manager	Year inducted	Years with the Bisons
Pud Galvin	1965	1878
Frank Grant	2006	1887–1888
John Montgomery Ward	1964	1877
