= Kohly Miller =

American baseball player (1874–1951)

- Infielder
- Born: January 1874; Cumru Township, Pennsylvania, U.S.
- Died: March 29, 1951 (aged 77); Reading, Pennsylvania, U.S.
- Batted: Unknown Threw: Unknown

MLB debut
- September 16, 1892, for the Washington Senators

Last MLB appearance
- October 2, 1897, for the Philadelphia Phillies

MLB statistics
- Batting average: .111
- Home runs: 0
- Runs batted in: 1
- Stats at Baseball Reference

Teams
- Washington Senators (1892); St. Louis Browns (1892); Philadelphia Phillies (1897)

Frank Aloyvisous Miller (January 1874 – March 29, 1951) was an American Major League Baseball infielder. He played in one game at shortstop for the Washington Senators in 1892, one game at third base for the St. Louis Browns in 1892 and three games at second base for the Philadelphia Phillies in 1897. His minor league playing career stretched from 1892–1900. He later managed in the minors in the Illinois–Indiana–Iowa League in 1904 and the South Atlantic League in 1910.
