= Fred Buckingham =

American baseball player (1876–1948)

- Pitcher
- Born: February 13, 1876; Blenheim, New York
- Died: December 3, 1948 (aged 72); Washington, D.C.
- Batted: Unknown Threw: Unknown

MLB debut
- August 30, 1895, for the Washington Senators

Last MLB appearance
- August 30, 1895, for the Washington Senators

MLB statistics
- Games: 1
- Strikeouts: 1
- ERA: 6.00
- Stats at Baseball Reference

Teams
- Washington Senators (1895)

Frederick Bristol Buckingham (February 13, 1876 – December 3, 1948) was a Major League Baseball pitcher. Buckingham played for the Washington Senators in the 1895 season. He played just one game in his career, pitching in 3 innings, with a 6.00 ERA.

Buckingham attended Yale University.

Buckingham was born in Blenheim, New York and died in Washington, D.C.
