= Harry Lyons (baseball) =

American baseball player (1866–1912)

- Harry Lyons 1888 baseball card for the St. Louis Browns
- Outfielder
- Born: March 25, 1866; Chester, Pennsylvania, U.S.
- Died: June 28, 1912 (aged 46); Mauricetown, New Jersey, U.S.
- Batted: Right Threw: Right

MLB debut
- August 29, 1887, for the Philadelphia Phillies

Last MLB appearance
- July 4, 1893, for the New York Giants

MLB statistics
- Batting average: .234
- Hits: 401
- Stolen bases: 120
- Stats at Baseball Reference

Teams
- Philadelphia Phillies (1887); St. Louis Browns (1887–1888); New York Giants (1889); Rochester Broncos (1890); New York Giants (1892–1893)

Harry Pratt Lyons (March 25, 1866 – June 28, 1912) was an American outfielder for the Philadelphia Phillies, St. Louis Browns, New York Giants, and Rochester Broncos from 1887 to 1893.

== Early life ==
Lyons was born March 25, 1866, in Chester, Pennsylvania.

== Career ==
He played for multiple minor league baseball teams including Ashland in the Central Pennsylvania League, Binghamton in the International Association of Professional Base Ball Players, the Buffalo Bisons, the Jersey City Skeeters, the Oswego Starchboxes, Portland Maine in the New England League, the Providence Grays, and the Worcester Grays.

He played as an outfielder in major league baseball for the Philadelphia Phillies in 1887, the St. Louis Browns from 1887 to 1889, the New York Giants in 1890, the Rochester Broncos in 1890, and the New York Giants again from 1892 to 1893.

He worked for the Philadelphia Water Department as an office clerk. He died June 28, 1912, in Buckshutem, New Jersey, and was interred at West Laurel Hill Cemetery in Bala Cynwyd, Pennsylvania.

== Sources ==
- Career statistics from Baseball Reference · Baseball Reference (Minors) · Retrosheet · Baseball Almanac
