= Ted Scheffler =

American baseball player (1864–1949)

- Outfielder
- Born: April 5, 1864; New York City, U.S.
- Died: February 24, 1949 (aged 84); Jamaica, Queens, New York, U.S.
- Batted: Right Threw: Right

MLB debut
- August 7, 1888, for the Detroit Wolverines

Last MLB appearance
- October 15, 1890, for the Rochester Broncos

MLB statistics
- Batting average: .237
- Runs batted in: 38
- Stolen bases: 81
- Stats at Baseball Reference

Teams
- Detroit Wolverines (1888); Rochester Broncos (1890)

Theodore J. Scheffler (April 5, 1864 – February 24, 1949) was an American professional baseball player whose career spanned from 1885 to 1902. He played two seasons in Major League Baseball as an outfielder for the Detroit Wolverines in 1888 and the Rochester Broncos in 1890.

== Early years ==
Scheffler was born in New York City in 1864. In 1887, he drew attention when he compiled a .429 batting average for the Manchester Farmers in the New England League.

== Major leagues ==
On August 3, 1888, the Detroit Wolverines of the National League purchased Scheffler from the Manchester club. He appeared in only 27 games for Detroit and compiled a .202 batting average. The Detroit team disbanded after the 1888 season, and Scheffler spent the 1889 season with the Worcester Grays in the Atlantic Association.

Scheffler got a second shot at the major leagues in 1890 with the Rochester Bronchos of the American Association. He appeared in 119 games, all of them as an outfielder, and led the league with 29 outfield assists. Despite a .245 batting average, Scheffler also showed a knack for getting on base. He ranked fourth in the league with 78 bases on balls and 14 times hit by pitch, contributing to a much higher on-base percentage of .374. He also showed great speed on the base paths, finishing second in the league with 77 stolen bases. His 111 runs scored were eighth most in the league.

== Minor leagues ==
In 1891, Scheffler played for the Buffalo Bisons in the Eastern Association. He totaled a career high 82 stolen bases and 17 triples in 123 games for Buffalo. Despite posting impressive statistics in 1890, and a strong showing with Buffalo in 1891, Scheffler never played again in the major leagues. He did play 17 seasons in the minor leagues, including prolonged stints with the Troy Trojans (1892-1894), Springfield Ponies/Maroons (1894-1897) and Newark Colts (1898-1899). Across all 17 minor league seasons, Scheffler compiled a .314 batting average, scored 1,143 runs, and contributed 95 triples and 475 stolen bases.

== Later years ==
Scheffler died in 1949 in the Jamaica, Queens, section of New York City.
