= Pat McCauley =

American baseball player (1870–1917)

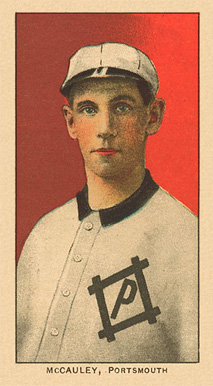
- Catcher
- Born: June 10, 1870; Ware, Massachusetts, U.S.
- Died: January 17, 1917 (aged 46); Hoboken, New Jersey, U.S.
- Batted: Unknown Threw: Right

MLB debut
- September 5, 1893, for the St. Louis Browns

Last MLB appearance
- September 3, 1903, for the New York Highlanders

MLB statistics
- Batting average: .193
- Home runs: 3
- Runs batted in: 12
- Stats at Baseball Reference

Teams
- St. Louis Browns (1893); Washington Senators (1896); New York Highlanders (1903)

Patrick F. McCauley (June 10, 1870 – January 17, 1917) was an American Major League Baseball player. McCauley played for the St. Louis Browns, Washington Senators and the New York Highlanders in 1893 and 1896 and 1903. He threw right-handed.

He was born in Ware, Massachusetts and died in Hoboken, New Jersey.
