= Jake Drauby =

American baseball player (1864–1916)

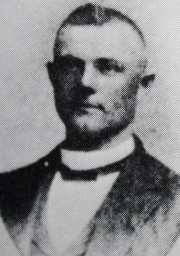
- Third baseman
- Born: January 1864; Harrisburg, Pennsylvania, U.S.
- Died: January 1, 1916 (aged 51–52); Summerdale, Pennsylvania, U.S.
- Batted: Unknown Threw: Unknown

MLB debut
- October 3, 1892, for the Washington Senators

Last MLB appearance
- October 15, 1892, for the Washington Senators

MLB statistics
- Batting average: .206
- Home runs: 0
- Runs batted in: 3
- Stats at Baseball Reference

Teams
- Washington Senators (1892)

Jacob F. Drauby (January 1864 – January 1, 1916) was an American Major League Baseball third baseman who played in ten games for the Washington Senators of the National League in 1892. He also had an extensive minor league career that lasted from 1886 through 1902. Drauby changed his surname to his original surname of Taubert sometime after he finished his Major League career.
