= Tom O'Brien (second baseman) =

American baseball player (1860–1921)

- Second baseman/First baseman
- Born: June 22, 1860; Salem, Massachusetts, U.S.
- Died: April 21, 1921 (aged 60); Worcester, Massachusetts, U.S.
- Batted: Right Threw: Right

MLB debut
- June 14, 1882, for the Worcester Ruby Legs

Last MLB appearance
- July 28, 1890, for the Rochester Broncos

MLB statistics
- Batting average: .231
- Home runs: 4
- Runs scored: 158
- Stats at Baseball Reference

Teams
- Worcester Ruby Legs (1882); Baltimore Orioles (1883); Boston Reds (1884); Baltimore Orioles (1885); New York Metropolitans (1887); Rochester Broncos (1890)

Thomas H. O'Brien (June 22, 1860 – April 21, 1921) was an American infielder in Major League Baseball who played for five clubs in parts of six seasons between 1882 and 1890. O'Brien batted and threw right-handed. He was born in Salem, Massachusetts.

A valuable utility, O'Brien played at least one game in each position except shortstop, although he played mostly at second base and first base. He reached the majors in 1882 with the Worcester Ruby Legs (NL), spending one year with them before moving to the Baltimore Orioles (AA), 1883), Boston Reds (UA, 1884), again with Baltimore (1885), and the New York Metropolitans (AA, 1887) and Rochester Broncos (AA, 1890). His most productive season came in 1884 with Boston, when he appeared in 103 games while hitting .263 with four home runs, 118 hits, 31 doubles, eight triples and 80 runs scored –all career-numbers.

In 270 games, O'Brien was a .231 hitter (257-for-1111), including 74 extra-base hits and 61 RBI.

O'Brien died in Worcester, Massachusetts, at the age of 60.
