= Dan Burke (baseball) =

American baseball player (1868–1933)

- Outfielder / Catcher
- Born: October 28, 1868; Abington, Massachusetts, U.S.
- Died: March 20, 1933 (aged 64); Taunton, Massachusetts, U.S.
- Batted: Right Threw: Right

MLB debut
- April 18, 1890, for the Rochester Broncos

Last MLB appearance
- October 1, 1892, for the Boston Beaneaters

MLB statistics
- Batting average: .175
- Home runs: 0
- Runs batted in: 9
- Stats at Baseball Reference

Teams
- Rochester Broncos (1890); Syracuse Stars (1890); Boston Beaneaters (1892)

Daniel L. Burke (October 25, 1868 – March 20, 1933) was an American reserve catcher and outfielder in Major League Baseball who played briefly for the Rochester Broncos and the Syracuse Stars in 1890, and with the Boston Beaneaters in 1892. Listed at 5' 10", 190 lb., Burke batted and threw right-handed. He was born in Abington, Massachusetts.

In a 42-game career, Burke was a .175 hitter (22-for-126) with 15 runs, one double, nine RBI, and a .307 on-base percentage without any home runs.

== Death ==
Burke died at the age of 64 in Taunton, Massachusetts.
