= Jimmy Knowles (baseball) =

Canadian baseball player (1856–1912)

- Third baseman / First baseman
- Born: September 5, 1856; Toronto, Canada West
- Died: February 11, 1912 (aged 55); Jersey City, New Jersey, U.S.
- Batted: Right Threw: Unknown

MLB debut
- May 2, 1884, for the Pittsburgh Alleghenys

Last MLB appearance
- October 12, 1892, for the New York Giants

MLB statistics
- Batting average: .241
- Home runs: 9
- Runs batted in: 132
- Stats at Baseball Reference

Teams
- Pittsburgh Alleghenys (1884); Brooklyn Atlantics (1884); Washington Nationals (1886); New York Metropolitans (1887); Rochester Broncos (1890); New York Giants (1892)

James Knowles (September 5, 1856 – February 11, 1912), nicknamed "Darby", was a Canadian Major League Baseball player who played mainly at the third base, but did play significant time at first base as well, for six different teams in his five-season career from 1884 to 1892. Born in Toronto, Ontario, Canada, Knowles died at the age of 55 in Jersey City, New Jersey, and is interred at Bayview – New York Bay Cemetery in Jersey City.
