= Dave McKeough =

American baseball player (1863–1901)

- Catcher
- Born: December 1, 1863; Utica, New York, U.S.
- Died: July 11, 1901 (aged 37); Utica, New York, U.S.
- Batted: Right Threw: Unknown

MLB debut
- April 22, 1890, for the Rochester Broncos

Last MLB appearance
- June 12, 1891, for the Philadelphia Athletics

MLB statistics
- Batting average: .232
- Home runs: 0
- Runs batted in: 23
- Stats at Baseball Reference

Teams
- Rochester Broncos (1890); Philadelphia Athletics (1891)

David John McKeough (December 1, 1863 – July 11, 1901) was an American professional baseball catcher. He played two seasons in Major League Baseball, for the Rochester Broncos in 1890 and the Philadelphia Athletics in 1891.
