= John Fitzgerald (Rochester Broncos pitcher) =

American baseball player (1866–1892)

- Pitcher
- Born: 1866; Waterbury, Connecticut, U.S.
- Died: December 20, 1892; Waterbury, Connecticut, U.S.
- Batted: Unknown Threw: Unknown

MLB debut
- April 18, 1890, for the Rochester Broncos

Last MLB appearance
- July 13, 1890, for the Rochester Broncos

MLB statistics
- Win–loss record: 3–8
- Earned run average: 4.04
- Innings pitched: 78
- Stats at Baseball Reference

Teams
- Rochester Broncos (1890)

John J. Fitzgerald (1866 – December 20, 1892), also known as Warren B. Fitzgerald, was an American Major League Baseball player who pitched one season in the Majors with the 1890 Rochester Broncos. He pitched in a total of 11 games, started all of them, and completed eight. He struck out 35 batters in 78 innings pitched.
