= Leo Smith (baseball) =

American baseball player (1859–1935)

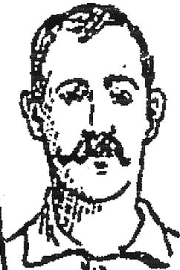
- Shortstop
- Born: May 13, 1859; Brooklyn, New York, U.S.
- Died: August 30, 1935 (aged 76); Brooklyn, New York, U.S.
- Batted: Right Threw: Unknown

MLB debut
- August 28, 1890, for the Rochester Broncos

Last MLB appearance
- October 15, 1890, for the Rochester Broncos

MLB statistics
- Batting average: .188
- Home runs: 0
- Runs scored: 11
- Stats at Baseball Reference

Teams
- Rochester Broncos (1890)

Lionel H. "Leo" Smith (May 13, 1859 in Brooklyn, New York – August 30, 1935 in Brooklyn, New York) was an American Major League Baseball shortstop. He played for the Rochester Broncos in 1890.
