= Harvey Blauvelt =

American baseball player (1867–1929)

- Pitcher
- Born: December 1867; New York City, New York, U.S.
- Died: May 25, 1929 (aged 61); Trumansburg, New York, U.S.
- Batted: Unknown Threw: Unknown

MLB debut
- June 22, 1890, for the Rochester Broncos

Last MLB appearance
- June 29, 1890, for the Rochester Broncos

MLB statistics
- Win–loss record: 0–0
- Earned run average: 10.22
- Strikeouts: 5
- Stats at Baseball Reference

Teams
- Rochester Broncos (1890)

Harvey King Blauvelt (December 1867 – May 25, 1929) was a 19th-century American Major League Baseball pitcher. He played in two games for the 1890 Rochester Broncos of the American Association.

Blauvelt's two appearances came in June 1890, and both were as a relief pitcher. The first was against the Brooklyn Gladiators, and the second was against the St. Louis Browns.
