= John Grim (baseball) =

American baseball player (1867–1961)

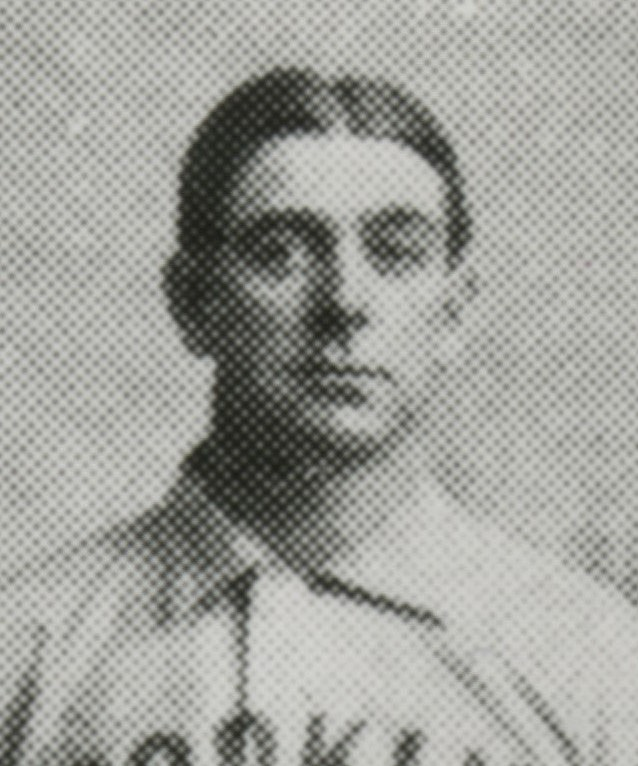
- Grim in 1898
- Catcher
- Born: August 9, 1867; Lebanon, Kentucky, U.S.
- Died: July 28, 1961 (aged 93); Indianapolis, Indiana, U.S.
- Batted: Right Threw: Right

MLB debut
- September 29, 1888, for the Philadelphia Quakers

Last MLB appearance
- July 13, 1899, for the Brooklyn Superbas

MLB statistics
- Batting average: .267
- Home runs: 16
- Runs batted in: 332

Teams
- Philadelphia Quakers (1888); Rochester Broncos (1890); Milwaukee Brewers (1891); Louisville Colonels (1892–1894); Brooklyn Grooms/Bridegrooms/Superbas (1895–1899)

John Helm Grim (August 9, 1867 – July 28, 1961) was an American catcher in Major League Baseball (MLB). He played 11 seasons in the majors from 1888 to 1899.

== Career ==
Grim was born in Lebanon, Kentucky the son of Louis Grim and Catherine Ritter. . Although he played in two games for the 1888 Philadelphia Quakers, his MLB career really started when he joined the Rochester Broncos of the American Association in 1890. Grim played sparingly for the Broncos and the Milwaukee Brewers in 1891. It wasn't until he joined the Louisville Colonels in 1892 that he became the starting catcher.

Grim played three seasons for Louisville, enjoying his best season in 1894 when he batted .299 with 7 home runs and 71 runs batted in. He played his final five seasons for the Brooklyn Grooms/Bridegrooms/Superbas with moderate success. In his 11-year career, Grim batted .267, hit 16 home runs, and drove in 332 runs. He also pitched one game and umpired three games.

Grim died in Indianapolis, Indiana, at the age of 93 and was interred at Crown Hill Cemetery.
