= Patrick T. Powers =

American baseball executive and manager (1860–1925)

Patrick Powers
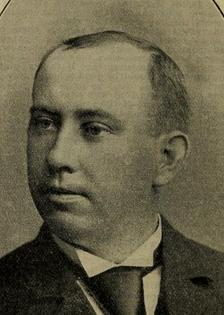
- Manager
- Born: June 27, 1860; Trenton, New Jersey, U.S.
- Died: August 29, 1925 (aged 65); Belmar, New Jersey, U.S.
- Batted: Unknown Threw: Unknown

MLB debut
- April 17, 1890, for the Rochester Broncos

Last MLB appearance
- October 15, 1892, for the New York Giants

MLB statistics
- Games managed: 286
- Win–loss record: 134–143
- Winning %: .484

Teams
- Rochester Broncos (1890); New York Giants (1892)

Patrick T. Powers (June 27, 1860 – August 29, 1925) was an American baseball executive who served as president of the Eastern League and founding president of the National Association of Professional Baseball Leagues (NAPBL). Already president of the Eastern League, he was elected by several minor league presidents on September 5, 1901, at the Leland Hotel in Chicago.

The purpose of the NAPBL was to keep the uniting minor leagues independent of the American League and National League, who were engaged in a turf war, stealing players and hurling accusations at each other. By then, the established major National League had abrogated its agreement with the minor leagues when threatened by the American side. After the American League won its equality with the National League, the two major leagues and the minor association led by Powers reestablished a National Agreement. Once again, a system was in place to protect rosters and territories and at the same time feed some players to the National and American Leagues.

Before becoming a league executive, Powers was a team manager including two seasons in the major leagues. In 1890, he led the Rochester Broncos of the American Association to a 63–63 record and a fifth-place finish. With the New York Giants in 1892, he finished 8th in the 12-team National League with a record of 71–80.

There were 35 leagues and 246 professional baseball clubs in the organization. It has continued on as the trade association of those lesser baseball leagues that make up organized baseball. It goes by the aforementioned moniker of Minor League Baseball today, which implies a universality no longer even approximately attained. Once again at the end of the 20th century as at the beginning, there were many independent professional leagues, such as the Northern League, Central League, and Golden Baseball League. Those leagues also feed players, albeit many fewer, to the major leagues.

Powers retired from the presidency of the NABPL in 1909, at a time when the Eastern League considered leaving. Michael H. Sexton was chosen to replace Powers as president at the Winter Meetings in 1909. Powers and Sexton have been considered the "fathers" of the current Minor League Baseball, as they thought alike and acted alike, and were in agreement on the path that the organization should take. As a result, Sexton extended the valuable legacy of Powers during the next 24 years.

In 1909, a group of three Eastern League owners attempted to oust Powers as league president, believing that he had not been impartial in his decision making and had made poor decisions when hiring umpires. Powers was reelected after neither his opposition's candidates - James R. Price and Ed Barrow, gained enough votes to take the presidency. In 1910, Barrow was elected president with 5 votes to Powers 3.

Powers died at the age of 65 in Belmar, New Jersey.
