= Ledell Titcomb =

American baseball player (1866–1950)

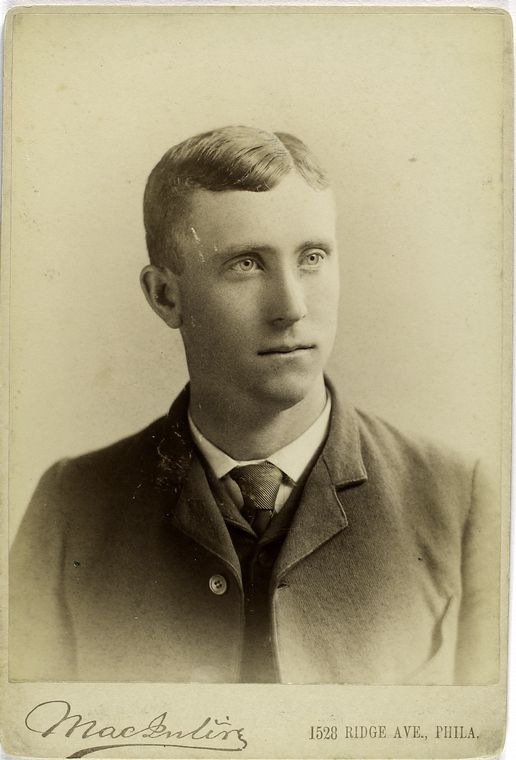
- Pitcher
- Born: August 26, 1866; West Baldwin, Maine, U.S.
- Died: June 8, 1950 (aged 83); Exeter, New Hampshire, U.S.
- Batted: Left Threw: Left

MLB debut
- May 5, 1886, for the Philadelphia Quakers

Last MLB appearance
- October 15, 1890, for the Rochester Broncos

MLB statistics
- Win–loss record: 30–29
- Earned run average: 3.47
- Strikeouts: 283
- Stats at Baseball Reference

Teams
- Philadelphia Quakers (1886); Philadelphia Athletics (1887); New York Giants (1887–1889); Rochester Broncos (1890)

Career highlights and awards
- 1888 National League champion; Pitched a no-hitter on September 15, 1890

Ledell N. Titcomb (August 21, 1866 – June 8, 1950), often referred to by the nickname Cannonball Titcomb, was an American professional baseball pitcher. He played for four major league teams from 1886 to 1890.

== Baseball career ==
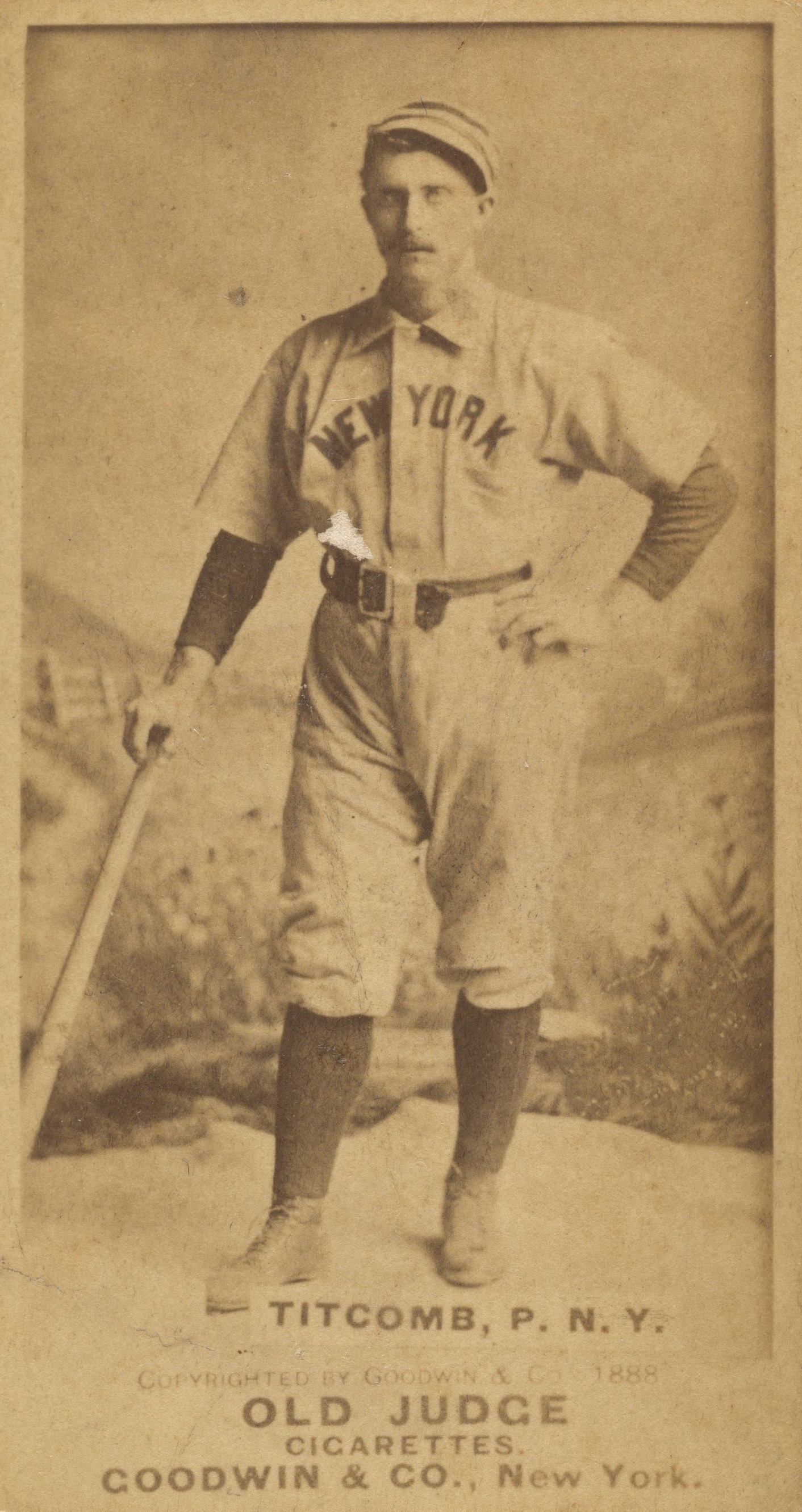
1888 baseball card of Titcomb

In 1885, Titcomb started his professional baseball career with the Haverhill, Massachusetts, team of the Eastern New England League.

Titcomb made his major league debut on May 5, 1886, for the Philadelphia Quakers of the National League in a game against the New York Giants. Philadelphia lost, 4–2. Titcomb finished the season with a 0–5 win–loss record in five games started with a 3.73 earned run average (ERA).

Titcomb started the 1887 season with the Philadelphia Athletics of the American Association before moving to the Jersey City Skeeters of the International Association and then to the New York Giants of the National League.

In 1888, with the Giants, Titcomb had his major league career-high in wins, going 14–8 with a 2.24 ERA. He helped New York win the National League pennant and the 1888 World Series.

In 1889, Titcomb played for the Giants and then for the Toronto Canucks of the International League. With Toronto, he went 15–13 and led the International League with a 1.28 ERA.

Titcomb split the 1890 season between the Toronto Canucks of the International Association and the Rochester Broncos of the American Association. On September 15, with Rochester, Titcomb threw a no-hitter against the Syracuse Stars in a 7–0 victory.

In 1891, Titcomb finished his professional baseball career with the Rochester Hop Bitters and the Providence Clamdiggers of the Eastern Association.

During his five-year major league career, Titcomb had a 30–29 win–loss record, a 3.74 ERA, and 283 strikeouts.

== Personal life ==
Born in West Baldwin, Maine, Titcomb was the son of Joseph J. Titcomb, a carpenter, and Fanny M. Titcomb. He was married to Margaret B. Titcomb, and they resided in both Massachusetts and New Hampshire. After his baseball career was over, Titcomb worked for the United Shoe Machinery Corporation.

Titcomb died at the age of 83 in Exeter, New Hampshire, and was interred at Greenwood Cemetery in Kingston, New Hampshire.

== Fictitious nickname ==
Posthumous chronicles and reference works about Titcomb referred to him as "Cannonball" (or "Cannon Ball") Titcomb, thus assigning him a nickname which was never used during his playing days and did not appear in newsprint until Titcomb was 82. Society for American Baseball Research historian and author Bill Lamb researched the origins of the nickname and in fall 2016 published an article in the SABR quarterly newsletter Nineteenth Century Notes debunking the nickname. After analyzing between 600 and 700 newspaper articles mentioning Titcomb, Lamb discovered that, "For the most part, Titcomb was identified by last name only during his pro career. On at least 17 occasions, however, 'Ledell Titcomb' appeared in newsprint. At no time whatsoever during his professional playing career did the putative nickname 'Cannon Ball'/'Cannonball' appear in the newspapers that covered Titcomb." Lamb further wrote, "A search for the surname Titcomb in newspapers published from the start of Titcomb's playing days in 1884 until the day before his death in June 1950 via GenealogyBank yielded 10,458 page hits. Linkage of the word 'Cannonball' with 'Titcomb' promptly reduced that number to zero." After his playing days, during which Titcomb worked in shoe manufacturing, reported Lamb, he was accorded "sparse newspaper attention. ... But on the odd occasion when his name did appear in print, it was always given as 'Ledell Titcomb,' never as 'Cannon Ball'/'Cannonball' Titcomb."

The nickname first appeared in print in 1948, two years before Titcomb's death. The Haverhill Gazette of Haverhill, Massachusetts, published a profile of the long-retired player, and the article included the following passage: "Those who remember Titcomb will recall that his pitches were so fast that the only fellow who could catch them was Bill (sic) Robinson, who later became manager of the Brooklyn Dodgers. His mates at Haverhill nicknamed him 'Cannonball' after he split a plank with a pitched ball." However, the unsubstantiated claim was unattributed in the article. When Titcomb died in 1950, the Gazette repeated the nickname in an obituary which included numerous biographical errors. Thereafter, obituaries published by the Associated Press and in The Sporting News, both of which drew upon the Gazette obituary, repeating the erroneous nickname as well as the factual errors.

== See also ==
- List of Major League Baseball no-hitters

Achievements
Preceded by Gus Weyhing	No-hitter pitcher September 15, 1890	Succeeded by Tom Lovett
