= Sam Trott =

American baseball player and manager (1859–1925)

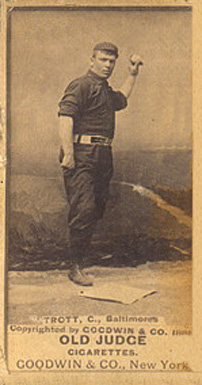
- Catcher
- Born: March 1859; Maryland, U.S.
- Died: June 5, 1925 (aged 66); Catonsville, Maryland, U.S.
- Batted: Left Threw: Left

MLB debut
- May 29, 1880, for the Boston Red Caps

Last MLB appearance
- July 28, 1888, for the Baltimore Orioles

MLB statistics
- At bats: 1354
- RBI: 123
- Home runs: 3
- Batting average: .250
- Stats at Baseball Reference

Teams
- As player: Boston Red Caps (1880); Detroit Wolverines (1881–1883); Baltimore Orioles (1884–1888); As manager: Washington Statesmen (1891)

Samuel W. Trott (March 1859 – June 5, 1925) was an American professional baseball player and manager whose career spanned from 1877 to 1891. He played eight seasons in Major League Baseball, principally as a catcher, for the Boston Red Caps (1880), Detroit Wolverines (1881–83), and Baltimore Orioles (1884–85, 1887–88). Trott also served as the manager the Washington Statesmen for their inaugural season in 1891.

== Early years ==
Trott was born in Maryland in 1859. His father, Samuel E. Trott, was a Maryland native and a carpenter. His mother, Laura J. Trott, was also a Maryland native.

== Professional baseball ==
=== Playing career ===
==== Minor leagues ====
Trott began his professional baseball career in 1877 playing for the Chicago Fairbanks and Philadelphia Athletic clubs in the League Alliance. In 1879, he played for the Washington Nationals.

==== Boston Red Caps ====
In May 1880, Trott was purchased from the Nationals by the Boston Red Caps of the National League where he made his major league debut. He appeared in 39 games for the Red Caps, 36 as a catcher, and compiled a .208 batting average.

==== Detroit Wolverines ====
In 1881, he joined the newly formed Detroit Wolverines in the National League. He played for the Wolverines in their first three seasons from 1881 to 1883, serving principally as a backup to catcher Charlie Bennett, though he also played 42 games at second base in 1883. In his three seasons with the Wolverines, Trott appeared in 113 games and compiled a .241 batting average with 23 doubles, three triples and 43 runs batted in.

==== Baltimore Orioles ====
Trott concluded his major league career by playing four seasons, principally as a catcher, for the Baltimore Orioles. He spent the 1884, 1885, 1887 and 1888 seasons with the Orioles, appeared in 208 games, and compiled a .262 batting average with 46 doubles, 18 triples, three home runs, 71 RBIs, and nine stolen bases.

=== Managerial career ===
In 1891, Trott served as the first manager of the Washington Statesmen. In their inaugural season, the Statesmen compiled a 44-91 record and finished ninth (last place) in American Association. Trott was handicapped as a manager by having a pitching staff that compiled a 4.83 earned run average, far above the league average of 3.71.

== Later years ==
By 1900, Trott was living with his wife Emma in Baltimore. They had two children then living with them, Bessie (born August 1890) and Samuel (born March 1900). Trott's occupation was listed as a cigar salesman. Ten years later, Trott was still living in Baltimore with wife, Emma, and they by then had three children, Bessie, Samuel and Dorothy. His occupation in 1910 was traveling salesman. Trott died in Catonsville, Maryland, in June 1925 at the age of 66.
