= Bob Miller (pitcher, born 1868) =

American baseball player (1868–1931)

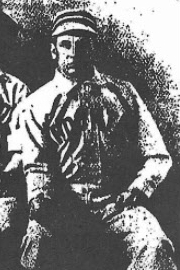
- Pitcher / Outfielder
- Born: June 1868; Newark, New Jersey, U.S.
- Died: May 23, 1931 (aged 62); Newark, New Jersey, U.S.
- Batted: Unknown Threw: Unknown

MLB debut
- August 30, 1890, for the Rochester Broncos

Last MLB appearance
- July 14, 1891, for the Washington Statesmen

MLB statistics
- Win–loss record: 5–12
- Earned run average: 4.29
- Strikeouts: 33
- Walks: 50
- Innings pitched: 92 1/3
- Stats at Baseball Reference

Teams
- Rochester Broncos (1890); Washington Statesmen (1891)

Robert W. Miller (June 1868 – May 23, 1931) was an American pitcher in Major League Baseball who played from 1890 through 1891 for the Rochester Broncos and Washington Statesmen of the American Association.
