= Culver Field =

Baseball ground in Rochester, New York, US

- Interactive map of Culver Field
- Location: Rochester, New York, United States
- Coordinates: 43°9′18″N 77°34′36″W
- Surface: Natural grass

Construction
- Opened: 1886
- Renovated: 1898
- Closed: 1907

Tenants
- Rochester Jingoes / Broncos / Hop Bitters (IA / AA / EA) (1889–1892); Rochester Bronchos (EL) (1899–1907)

Culver Field is a former baseball ground located in Rochester, New York. Located at the northwest corner of University Avenue and Culver Road, Culver Field was home of the Rochester Broncos from 1886 until it burned down on October 8, 1893.

Re-built for the 1898 season, the new Culver Field played host to the newly named Rochester Beau Brummels for a decade. However, the right field bleachers collapsed May 19, 1906, leading to dozens of injuries and lawsuits. After the 1907 season, the ballpark was acquired by Gleason Works, which turned the site into the plant that stands to this day.

Late in the 1898 season, three neutral-site games were played in Rochester, between the Brooklyn Dodgers and Cleveland Spiders of the National League. The games of August 27 and 29 were played at Culver Field. The game of the 28th (a Sunday) was played at the Ontario Beach Grounds in Charlotte (which is now part of Rochester).
