= Will Calihan =

American baseball player (1869–1917)

- Pitcher
- Born: May 1869; Oswego, New York, U.S.
- Died: December 20, 1917 (aged 48); Rochester, New York, U.S.
- Batted: Right Threw: Right

MLB debut
- April 17, 1890, for the Rochester Broncos

Last MLB appearance
- June 20, 1891, for the Philadelphia Athletics

MLB statistics
- Win–loss record: 24-21
- Strikeouts: 155
- Earned run average: 4.14
- Stats at Baseball Reference

Teams
- Rochester Broncos (1890); Philadelphia Athletics (1891)

William T. Calihan (May 1869 – December 20, 1917) was an American professional baseball player. He played in Major League Baseball as a right-handed pitcher and outfielder from 1890 to 1891. He played for the Rochester Broncos in 1890 and the Philadelphia Athletics in 1891, both of the American Association.

== Biography ==
Born in Oswego, Calihan had a brother named Tom who was a catcher in the minor leagues. In 1888, Calihan and his brother briefly formed a battery with Calihan's first professional baseball team, the minor-league Rochester Jingoes. Calihan had a 14–16 record with Rochester that year. The Rochester front office thought that Calihan drank excessively and presented behavioral issues. He ended up with the Buffalo Bisons during the 1889 season.

It looked as if Calihan might join Buffalo's team that was forming in the Players' League in 1890, but the team ultimately lost interest in Calihan. Instead, he entered the major leagues with the Rochester Broncos of the American Association that year. In one season with the Broncos, Calihan had an 18–15 win-loss record and appeared 12 times in the outfield. He spent his last major-league season (1891) with the Philadelphia Athletics, earning a 6–6 record in 13 games. In 50 games as a pitcher, his record was 24–21 with 42 complete games in 47 starts and an ERA of 4.14. In 63 total games played he batted .158 with one home run, 18 RBI, and 22 runs scored.

Calihan remained in the minor leagues through 1898, mostly as an infielder. He married once, but his wife died in 1896 when he was playing in the minor leagues in Atlanta. Calihan died of pneumonia at the age of 48 in Rochester, New York.
