= Bob Barr (1880s pitcher) =

American baseball player (1856–1930)

- Pitcher
- Born: December 1856; Washington, D.C., U.S.
- Died: March 11, 1930 (aged 73); Washington, D.C., U.S.
- Batted: Right Threw: Right

MLB debut
- June 23, 1883, for the Pittsburgh Alleghenys

Last MLB appearance
- September 12, 1891, for the New York Giants

MLB statistics
- Win–loss record: 49-98
- Earned run average: 3.83
- Strikeouts: 588
- Stats at Baseball Reference

Teams
- Pittsburgh Alleghenys (1883); Washington Nationals (AA) (1884); Indianapolis Hoosiers (AA) (1884); Washington Nationals (NL) (1886); Rochester Broncos (1890); New York Giants (1891)

Robert McClelland Barr (December, 1856 – March 11, 1930) was an American Major League Baseball pitcher. He also made some appearances as an outfielder, first baseman, and third baseman.

Barr played for the Pittsburgh Alleghenys, Washington Nationals, Indianapolis Hoosiers, and Rochester Broncos, all of the American Association. He also played for the National League teams the Washington Nationals and New York Giants.

Barr married Fanny Q. They had two daughters and one son, Mrs. C. Hugh Duffy, Ethel Q. and James R. He died on March 11, 1930. He was buried in Oak Hill Cemetery.

== See also ==
- List of Major League Baseball annual saves leaders
