= Danny Richardson (baseball) =

American baseball player (1863–1926)

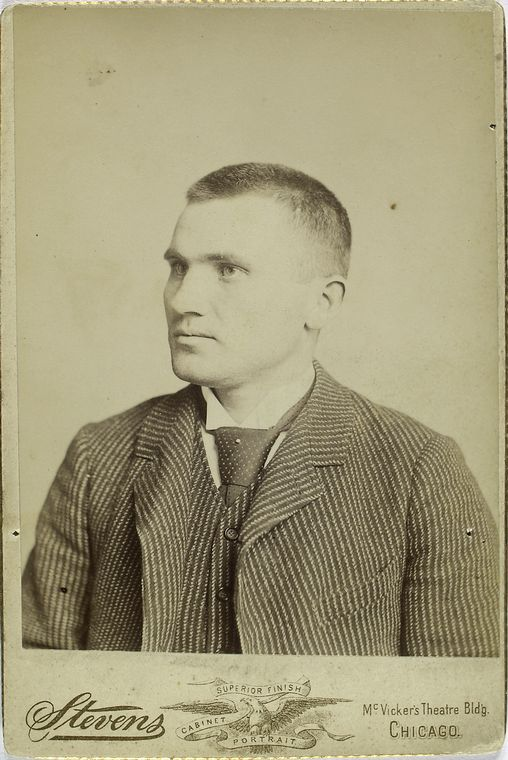
- Richardson in 1888
- Second baseman / Shortstop
- Born: January 25, 1863; Elmira, New York, U.S.
- Died: September 15, 1926 (aged 63); New York, New York, U.S.
- Batted: Right Threw: Right

MLB debut
- May 22, 1884, for the New York Giants

Last MLB appearance
- September 24, 1894, for the Louisville Colonels

MLB statistics
- Batting average: .254
- Home runs: 32
- Runs batted in: 558
- Stats at Baseball Reference

Teams
- As player: New York Giants (NL) (1884–1889); New York Giants (PL) (1890); New York Giants (NL) (1891); Washington Senators (1892); Brooklyn Grooms (1893); Louisville Colonels (1894); As manager: Washington Senators (1892)

Daniel Richardson (January 25, 1863 – September 15, 1926) was an American second baseman in professional baseball. He played in Major League Baseball for the New York Giants (NL), New York Giants (PL), Washington Senators, Brooklyn Grooms, and Louisville Colonels from 1884 to 1894.

== See also ==
- List of Major League Baseball single-game hits leaders
- List of Major League Baseball player-managers
