= Jack Doyle (baseball) =

Irish baseball player (1869–1958)

- First baseman / Manager
- Born: October 25, 1869; Killorglin, Ireland
- Died: December 31, 1958 (aged 89); Holyoke, Massachusetts, U.S.
- Batted: Right Threw: Right

MLB debut
- August 20, 1889, for the Columbus Solons

Last MLB appearance
- July 13, 1905, for the New York Highlanders

MLB statistics
- Batting average: .299
- Home runs: 25
- Runs batted in: 971
- Stolen bases: 518
- Stats at Baseball Reference
- Managerial record at Baseball Reference

Teams
- As player: Columbus Solons (1889–1890); Cleveland Spiders (1891–1892); New York Giants (1892–1895); Baltimore Orioles (NL) (1896–1897); Washington Senators (NL) (1898); New York Giants (1898–1900); Chicago Orphans (1901); New York Giants (1902); Washington Senators (1902); Brooklyn Superbas (1903–1904); Philadelphia Phillies (1904); New York Highlanders (1905); As manager: New York Giants (1895); Washington Senators (NL) (1898)

John Joseph Doyle (October 25, 1869 – December 31, 1958) was an Irish born first baseman in Major League Baseball whose career spanned 17 seasons, mainly in the National League. He was born in Killorglin, Ireland, and emigrated to the U.S. when he was a child, his family settling in Holyoke, Massachusetts.

== Playing career ==
After attending Fordham University, he embarked on a baseball career that would last 70 years. He made his first appearance at the major league level by signing and playing two years for the Columbus Solons of the American Association. Doyle would play for ten clubs from 1889 to 1905, batting .299 in 1,569 games with 518 stolen bases. He began as a catcher–outfielder and became a first baseman in 1894. His best years were in 1894, when he batted .367 for the New York Giants, and in 1897, when he hit .354 with 62 stolen bases for the Baltimore Orioles. He is credited with being the first pinch-hitter in pro ball, with Cleveland at Brooklyn on June 7, 1892. Patsy Tebeau was the manager and Doyle came through with a game-winning single.

For the 1894 season, he took over the everyday duties at first base and became team captain. Manager John Montgomery Ward not only made the decision to replace his former teammate and friend Roger Connor, but released him as well. Connor was a very popular player, and this decision drew the ire and scrutiny from the fans and media alike. Ward defended his decision and claimed the move came down to the fact that he liked Doyle's playing style, describing him as a hustler. Replacing Connor at first base proved worth the risk, as Jack batted .367 that season, and he totaled 100 runs batted in and stole 42 bases.

== Dirty Jack ==
Because of his aggressive playing style, Doyle was known as "Dirty Jack", often feuding with umpires, fans, opposing players, and even, at times, his own teammates. On one occasion, in Cincinnati on July 4, 1900, while in the 3rd inning of the second game of a doubleheader, Doyle slugged umpire Bob Emslie after being called out on a steal attempt. Fans jumped from the stands as the two fought before being chased back by policemen. After players finally separated Doyle from Emslie, he was arrested and fined. On July 1, 1901, when he was being harassed by a Polo Grounds fan, he jumped into the stands and hit him once with his left hand, reinjuring it after having broken it several weeks earlier.

He carried on a lengthy feud with John McGraw that started when they were teammates at Baltimore. McGraw, of course, had to have the last word. In 1902, McGraw was appointed manager of the Giants, and his first act was to release Doyle, even though he was batting .301 and fielding .991 at the time. Even with these seemingly out-of-control traits, Doyle was deemed a natural leader and was selected as team captain in New York, Brooklyn and Chicago, and served as an interim manager for the Giants in 1895 and Washington Senators in 1898.

== Minor league success ==
In 1905, after playing one game with the New York Highlanders, Doyle became manager of Toledo of the Western Association. One year later, in 1906, he was named the manager of the Des Moines Champions, so named because they won the league championship the previous year, and won it again under Doyle's helm. Following his championship season at Des Moines, he managed Milwaukee in 1907.

== Other career capacities ==
In 1908–09, the only years of his adult life spent outside of baseball, he served as police commissioner of his hometown of Holyoke. Doyle returned to the game as an umpire and worked in the National League for 42 games in 1911. Later on he would join the Chicago Cubs as a scout in 1920. In his many years with the Cubs, Doyle was credited with signing or recommending the acquisition of such stars as Gabby Hartnett, Hack Wilson, Billy Herman, Stan Hack, Bill Jurges, Charlie Root, Bill Lee, Augie Galan, Riggs Stephenson and Phil Cavarretta. He remained in that capacity until his death on New Year's Eve 1958 at the age of 89. He was buried at St. Jerome Cemetery in Holyoke.

== Honors ==
In the Irish Baseball League, the annual award for best slugger is named "The 'Dirty' Jack Doyle" Silver Slugger Award.

== See also ==
- List of Major League Baseball career stolen bases leaders
- List of players from Ireland in Major League Baseball
- List of Major League Baseball player-managers
- List of Major League Baseball single-game hits leaders
