= Rochester Bronchos =

The Rochester Bronchos were a minor league baseball team based in Rochester, New York, from 1899 to 1911.

In 1899, the franchise was purchased by a syndicate of local businessmen doing business as the "Flower City Baseball Company": George W. Sweeney, the president of the Rochester Trotting Association, John Nash, F. E.Youngs, Edward F. Higgins, and John H. Callahan, and the team was renamed the Bronchos. The owners hired Al Buckenberger as manager, and, despite having been a last-place team the previous year, the Bronchos won the Eastern League title. They also won the Eastern League title in 1901.

In 1903, the nickname was changed to Beau Brummels. However, the team's fortunes did not improve, and the 1904 Beau Brummels were named the worst team in Rochester history, with a record of 28-105. In 1909, the Bronchos again managed to go from last to first, improving from 55-82 to 90-61. They won the pennant the next two years as well, with 92-61 and 98-54 seasons.

Buckenberger returned to the Bronchos in 1905, but the team continued to flounder. In 1908, he was summarily fired during a game and replaced by the shortstop, Eddie Holly. In 1909, John "Big Jawn" Ganzel became the manager, and the team was renamed the Rochester Hustlers. The move was a success, with the team winning three straight Eastern League pennants in 1909–1911. In 1909, the team bore the nickname Camels.

Until 1908, the team played at Culver Field. That year, they moved to the newly constructed "Baseball Park".

Season	Record	Manager	Notes
1899	72-43	Al Buckenberger	Won Eastern League title.
1900	77-56	Al Buckenberger	
1901	?	Al Buckenberger	Won Eastern League title.
1902	?	Hal O'Hagan and Ed McKean	
1903	?	Al Johnson, Arthur Irwin and George Smith	
1904	28-105	George Smith	
1905	?	Al Buckenberger	
1906	77-62	Al Buckenberger	
1907	59-76	Al Buckenberger	
1908	55-82	Ed Holly	Finished last of eight teams.
1909	90-61	John Ganzel	Finished first of eight teams.
1910	92-61	John Ganzel	Finished first of eight teams.
1911	98-54	John Ganzel	Finished first of eight teams.

== See also ==
- List of baseball parks in Rochester, New York
