= Pop Snyder =

American baseball player, manager, and umpire (1854–1924)

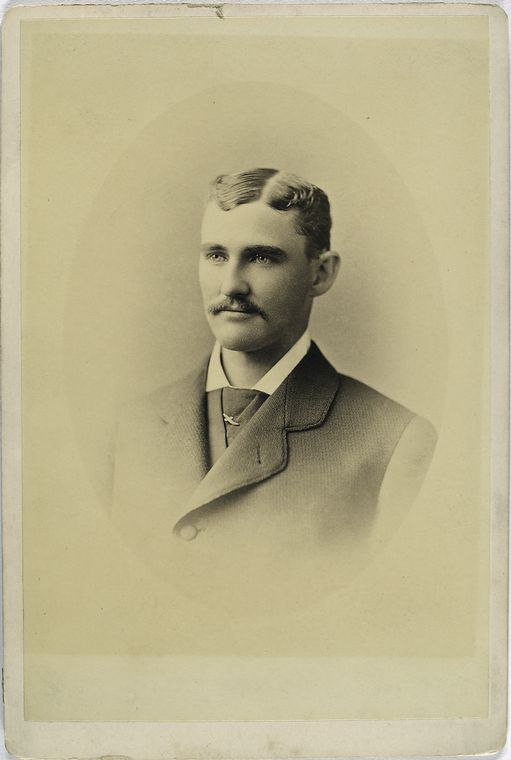
- Catcher / Manager / Umpire
- Born: October 6, 1854; Washington, D.C., U.S.
- Died: October 29, 1924 (aged 70); Washington, D.C., U.S.
- Batted: Right Threw: Right

MLB debut
- June 16, 1873, for the Washington Blue Legs

Last MLB appearance
- July 4, 1891, for the Washington Statesmen

MLB statistics
- Batting average: .235
- Home runs: 9
- Runs batted in: 384
- Stats at Baseball Reference

Teams
- As player: Washington Blue Legs (1873); Baltimore Canaries (1874); Philadelphia White Stockings (1875); Louisville Grays (1876–1877); Boston Red Caps (1878–1879), (1881); Cincinnati Reds (1882–1886); Cleveland Spiders (1887–1889); Cleveland Infants (1890); Washington Statesmen (1891); As manager: Cincinnati Reds (1882–1884); Washington Statesmen (1891)

Charles N. "Pop" Snyder (October 6, 1854 – October 29, 1924) was an American catcher, manager, and umpire in Major League Baseball.

== Biography ==
His 18-season playing career began in 1873 for the Washington Blue Legs of the National Association, and ended with the 1891 Washington Statesmen. He led his league in several defensive categories during his career, including putouts by a catcher three times, assists by a catcher three times, double plays by a catcher three times, and fielding percentage by a catcher three times.

He became a player-manager in 1882, when the Cincinnati Red Stockings of the American Association, formed. His team won the American Association pennant that first season, his second as a player; he was a member of the National League champion Boston Red Caps team. He was the manager for the Red Stockings, now known as the Reds, for the first two seasons of the Red Stockings existence, and part of third when he replaced Will White despite a 44–27 mark after 71 games. In 1891, at the age of 36, he played and managed his last season, this time when the Washington Statesmen entered the National League.

During his playing and managerial career, he would perform duties as an umpire when the need arose, but it wasn't until 1890, in the Players' League, that he began to see significant time in that capacity. It was after his career as a player and manager that began a full-time career as an umpire. This lasted intermittently from 1892 to 1901. In total he umpired 390 games in four different leagues; the National Association, the American Association, the Players' League, and the National League. Snyder died in his hometown of Washington, D.C. at the age of 70, and is interred at Glenwood Cemetery in D.C. He also holds the all-time major league record with 763 passed balls.

== See also ==
- List of Major League Baseball player–managers
