= Sandy Griffin =

American baseball player (1858–1926)

- Outfielder
- Born: October 24, 1858 Fayetteville, New York, U.S.
- Died: June 4, 1926 (aged 67) Syracuse, New York, U.S.
- Batted: Right Threw: Right

MLB debut
- May 26, 1884, for the New York Gothams

Last MLB appearance
- May 27, 1893, for the St. Louis Browns

MLB statistics
- Batting average: .275
- Home runs: 5
- Runs batted in: 78
- Stats at Baseball Reference

Teams
- As player: New York Gothams (1884); Rochester Broncos (1890); Washington Statesmen (1891); St. Louis Browns (1893); As manager: Washington Statesmen (1891)

Tobias Charles "Sandy" Griffin (October 24, 1858 – June 24, 1926) was an American Major League Baseball center fielder.

Griffin played for the New York Gothams (1884), Rochester Broncos (1890), Washington Statesmen (1891), and the National League St. Louis Browns (1893).

His most notable season was 1890 when he batted .307 in 107 games and finished in his league's top ten for doubles, home runs, and extra base hits. In 166 total games played he batted .275 with 5 home runs, 78 RBI, and 116 runs scored.

Griffin died at the age of 67 in Syracuse, New York of undisclosed causes.

== See also ==
- List of Major League Baseball player–managers
