= International Association of Professional Base Ball Players =

North American baseball league (1877-1880)

- Most recent season or competition: 1880 National Association season
- Sport: Baseball
- First season: 1877
- Folded: 1880
- Claim to fame: Third professional baseball organization
- Countries: United States; Canada

The International Association of Professional Base Ball Players, (Note: Also reported as International Association of Professional Baseball Clubs or International Association of Base-Ball Players.) commonly known as the International Association (IA), was a Canadian-American professional baseball league that operated from 1877 to 1880. For its last two years, it was renamed the National Association (NA), (Note: Not to be confused with the major-league National Association (1871–1875) or the National Association which governed minor-league baseball.) having lost all of its Canadian teams. While generally viewed as inferior to its main rival, the National League, some baseball historians consider the International Association to be a major league.

The IA featured many 19th century baseball stars, including future Hall of Famers Candy Cummings, Pud Galvin, John Montgomery Ward, Mickey Welch, Ned Hanlon, and Bud Fowler. The Syracuse, Buffalo, and Worcester clubs would go on to play in the National League after leaving the IA.

== International Association of 1877–1878 ==
The Association's by-laws and constitution required member teams to pay $10 to join the league (plus an additional $15 to compete for the championship) and fan admission was set at 25 cents. Visiting teams were guaranteed $75, plus half of the gate receipts when they exceeded that amount ($75).

Pitcher Candy Cummings was the first president of the International Association, while also a player for the Lynn Live Oaks of Massachusetts in 1877.

Jimmy Williams of Columbus served as the league's first Secretary.

=== 1877 season ===
In 1877, the International Association featured teams based in:

- London, Ontario, Canada (London Tecumsehs)
- Pittsburgh, Pennsylvania (Pittsburgh Allegheny)
- Rochester, New York (The Rochesters)
- Manchester, New Hampshire (The Manchesters)
- Columbus, Ohio (Columbus Buckeyes)
- Guelph, Ontario, Canada (Guelph Maple Leafs)
- Lynn, Massachusetts (Lynn Live Oaks)

==== Final standings ====
Final standings of the 1877 season:

- London Tecumsehs 14-4-2*
- Pittsburgh Allegheny 13-6-0
- Rochester (The Rochesters), NY 10-8-0
- Manchester (The Manchesters), NH 9-10-0
- Columbus Buckeyes 9-11-2
- Guelph Maple Leafs 4-12-0
- Lynn (Massachusetts) Live Oaks 1-9-0 * disbanded

Fred Goldsmith, London's star pitcher, had a 14–4 record in 193 innings pitched with three shutouts, during International Association play in 1877.

=== 1878 season ===
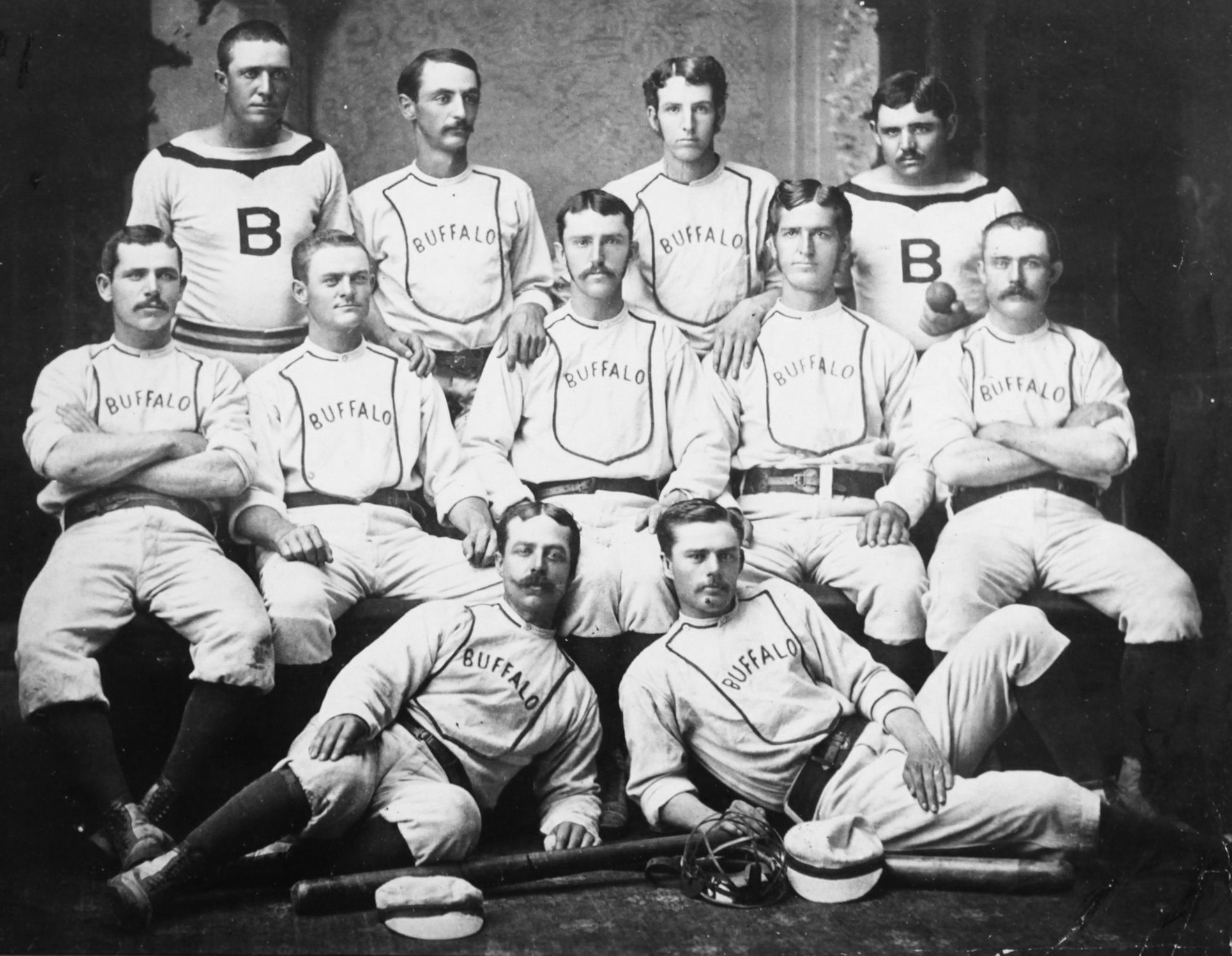
The 1878 IA champion Buffalo Bisons.

In 1878, the league lost two teams, Guelph and Columbus; however, it added the Binghamton Crickets, Hornellsville Hornells, Lowell Lowells and Syracuse Stars. The cities of Buffalo, New York, Hartford, Connecticut, New Bedford, Massachusetts, New Haven, Connecticut, Springfield, Massachusetts and Worcester, Massachusetts also had representatives.

Bud Fowler, the first African-American player in organized baseball, pitched for the Lynn club in 1878.

Buffalo was awarded the pennant at the league's winter meetings, after resolving a controversy where the second-place Syracuse club claimed a win by forfeit that would have tied them for the league lead. The win was vacated, but the convention voted to give third-place Utica the pennant instead, citing Syracuse and Buffalo leaving the IA for the National League. They reversed their decision the next day, leaving Buffalo with the pennant.

== Transformation and hiatus ==
The Buffalo Bisons, winners of the 1878 pennant, and the Syracuse Stars seriously hurt the International Association when they joined the rival National League for the 1879 season. At the same time, the London Tecumsehs dropped out of the league, causing it to be renamed the National Base Ball Association entering the 1879 season. Under that name, it played through the 1880 season before dissolving. Newspapers of the era referred to it more succinctly as the National Contest or National Championship, not to be confused with the National League, which was known simply as the League.

=== 1879 ===
Teams from nine cities competed during the 1879 season: Teams of this era were commonly referred to simply by their city, such as "the Holyokes" or "the Worcesters".

- Albany, New York (known as the "Blue Stockings")
- Holyoke, Massachusetts
- Manchester, New Hampshire
- New Bedford, Massachusetts
- Rochester, New York (known as the "Hop Bitters")
- Springfield, Massachusetts
- Utica, New York (known as the "Pent Ups")
- Washington, D.C. (known as the "Nationals")
- Worcester, Massachusetts (known as the "Grays")

Standings published in early October 1879, with the season "regarded as virtually closed", were:

Team	Won	Lost	Win %	Played
Albany	25	13	.658	38
Washington	23	16	.590	39
Holyoke	23	16	.590	39
Worcester	19	23	.452	42
New Bedford	12	30	.286	42
Springfield	16	14	.533	30
Manchester	7	8	.467	15
Rochester	6	9	.400	15
Utica	3	5	.375	8

After the season, Worcester left the IA to join the National League.

=== 1880 ===
Teams from four cities competed during the 1880 season:

- Albany, New York
- Baltimore, Maryland
- Rochester, New York (known as the "Hop Bitters")
- Washington, D.C. (known as the "Nationals")

The season began on May 1, with Albany and Washington playing to a 4–4 draw in 11 innings in Albany. Rochester did not join the association until June. By early August, Baltimore had dropped out, with records of contests played between the remaining three teams published as:

Team	Won	Lost	Win %	Played
Washington	16	8	.667	24
Albany	7	13	.350	20
Rochester	6	8	.429	14

Games were played as late as the first week in September, with Washington defeating Rochester, 4–2, in a game played in Baltimore on September 2.

== Legacy ==
Some baseball historians consider the International Association the first minor league; others point out that the league was conceived as a rival to the National League, now thought of as the sole major league of the era. Statistics of players who competed in the International Association and other early non-major leagues, such as the New England League, are grouped as "Other" by the Baseball-Reference.com reference site. The Northwestern League of 1883–1884 is regarded as the first true minor league.

== Sources ==
- The Northern Game: Baseball the Canadian Way by Bob Elliott (Sport Classic, 2005).
- Heritage Baseball: City of London a souvenir program from July 23, 2005, celebrating the history of Labatt Park and London, Ontario's 150th anniversary as an incorporated city.
- Boys of Summer: Knute, Boot, Milky and Buck by Don Maudsley (SCENE magazine, London, Ontario, June 15, 2000).
- The magic continues at London's Field of Dreams by Barry Wells (SCENE magazine, London, Ontario, June 15, 2000).
- Canada's Baseball Capital Celebrates 143rd Year by William Humber (page 36 of the London Majors Baseball Club, 1998 Souvenir Program).
- Diamonds of the North: A Concise History of Baseball in Canada by William Humber (Oxford University Press, 1995).
- The Beaver, Exploring Canada's History, Baseball's Canadian Roots: Abner Who? by Mark Kearney (October–November 1994).
- Diamond Rituals: Baseball in Canadian Culture by Robert K. Barney, (Meckler Books, 1989).
- Journal of Sport History, A Critical Examination of a Source in Early Ontario Baseball: The Reminiscence of Adam E. Ford by UWO Professor Robert K. Barney and Nancy Bouchier (Vol. 15, No. 1, Spring 1988).
- Who's Who in Canadian Sport by Bob Ferguson, (Summerhill Press Ltd., 1985).
- Cheering for the Home Team: The Story of Baseball in Canada by William Humber, (The Boston Mills Press, 1983).
- Old Time Baseball and the London Tecumsehs of the late 1870s by Les Bronson, a recorded (and later transcribed) talk given to the London & Middlesex Historical Society on February 15, 1972. Available in the London Room of the London Public Library, Main Branch.
- Bill Stern's Favorite Baseball Stories by Bill Stern, (Blue Ribbon Books, Garden City, New York, 1949).
