= Washington Senators (1891–1899) =

American professional baseball team

- Founded: 1891
- Folded: 1899
- League: National League (1892–1899); American Association (1891)
- Location: Washington, D.C.
- Ballpark: Boundary Field
- Owner: J. Earl Wagner (1892–1899)
- Manager: Arthur Irwin (1898–1899); Deacon McGuire (1898); Jack Doyle (1898); Tom Brown (1897–1898); Gus Schmelz (1894–1897); Jim O'Rourke (1893); Danny Richardson (1892); Arthur Irwin (1892); Billy Barnie (1892); Sandy Griffin (1891); Dan Shannon (1891); Pop Snyder (1891); Sam Trott (1891)

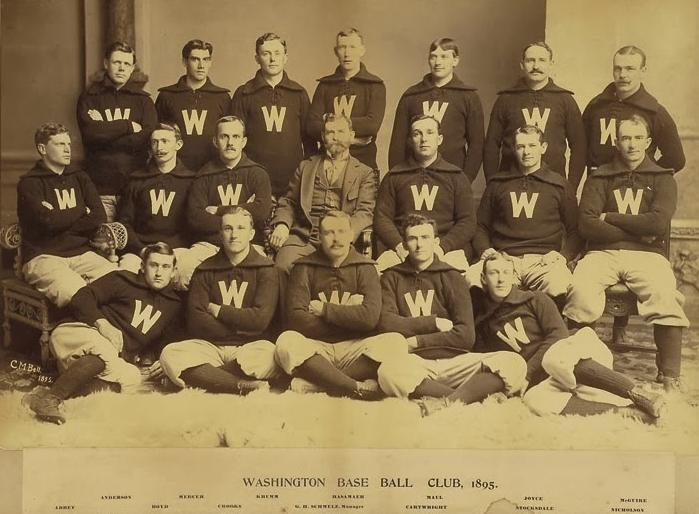
Washington Senators 1895

The Washington Senators were a 19th-century baseball team. The team was also known as the Washington Statesmen and the Washington Nationals. The team played at Boundary Field.

The team started out in the American Association as the Washington Statesmen in 1891. The American Association folded after that season, and the team was purchased by J. Earl Wagner, who would own the team for the remainder of its existence. The Statesmen moved to the National League for the 1892 season, becoming the Senators. When the NL contracted from twelve teams to eight after the 1899 season, the Senators were one of the teams eliminated.

The Senators did not fare well in their nine years as a franchise, which might have been the reason they were contracted. Washington never had a winning season and compiled a winning percentage of 0.366. Among their more famous players were Deacon McGuire and Hall of Famer Jim O'Rourke.

After a one-year hiatus, the Senators returned, but they were no longer the same franchise that played at Boundary Field. In fact the Original Senators were the first of three teams, all called the Washington Senators, and were in the Capital continuously until the third Senators franchise left to become the Texas Rangers. The second had left the city in 1960 becoming the Minnesota Twins and were followed immediately by a new expansion team of the same name, ultimately leaving for Texas in 1971. Baseball returned to the Capital in 2005 when the Montreal Expos became the Washington Nationals. The "Washington Senators" name was still owned by the Texas Rangers, so organizers sought other options. Washington, D.C., mayor Anthony A. Williams supported the name "Washington Grays," in honor of the Negro-league team the Homestead Grays (1929–1950), which had been based in Pittsburgh, but played many of their home games in Washington. In the end, the team owners chose the name "Washington Nationals," which had been the official name of the American League's Washington Senators from 1905 to 1955.

== Baseball Hall of Famers ==
Washington Senators Hall of Famers
Inductee	Position	Tenure	Inducted
Roger Bresnahan	C/OF	1897	1945
Jim O'Rourke	OF/Manager	1893	1945

== See also ==
- List of Washington Senators (1891–1899) managers
- Washington Senators (1891–1899) all-time roster
