= Rochester Broncos =

Baseball team

Information
- League: American Association
- Location: Rochester, New York
- Ballpark: Culver Field
- Founded: 1889
- Folded: 1891
- Former leagues: Minor league: Eastern Association (1891); International Association (1889)
- President: Henry Brinker
- Manager: Patrick T. Powers

The Rochester Broncos were a short-lived baseball team in the American Association, playing only one season, in 1890. They finished fifth in the league with a record of 63–63. Their home games were played at Culver Field.

Rochester was one of three clubs (the other two being Syracuse and Toledo) who played in the International Association in 1889 and were brought in to replace Brooklyn and Cincinnati (which defected to the National League), Baltimore (which left for the Atlantic Association), and Kansas City (which ended up in the Western Association). In the IA, they had played as the Rochester Jingoes.

The Broncos were managed by Pat Powers, who later managed the New York Giants in 1892. Their leading hitter was center fielder Sandy Griffin, who batted .307 in 107 games. Bob Barr (28–24, 3.25) and Will Calihan (18–15, 3.28) were their best pitchers. Ledell Titcomb threw a no-hitter on September 15.

The struggling American Association simply could not afford another season with its Little Three of Rochester, Syracuse, and Toledo. Therefore, team president Henry Brinker-who owned a brewery and a railroad-decided to accept a share of a $24,000 buyout to leave the AA.

In 1891, the Broncos played in the Eastern Association as the Rochester Hop Bitters.

== See also ==
- 1890 Rochester Broncos season
- Rochester Broncos all-time roster
